= Carl Wilhelm =

German film director (1872–1936)

Carl Wilhelm (born 1872 in Vienna; died in London 1936), was a prolific German film director, film producer and screenwriter of the silent film era, at the end of which his career apparently entirely faded away and he vanished into obscurity.

== Life ==
After his first work, the short documentary film Ein vergnügter Wintertag im Berliner Grunewald, made for the producer Oskar Messter in 1909, Wilhelm worked for many other Berlin production companies. For example, in the years before World War I, he filmed for Deutsche Mutoskop- und Biograph GmbH in Lankwitz and BB-Film-Fabrikation Bolten-Baeckers in Steglitz a series of comedies starring the silent film star Leo Peukert.

The two comedies he shot in 1913 and 1914 with Ernst Lubitsch - Die Firma heiratet and Der Stolz der Firma - were very successful. As late as 1919 a critic could write: "Die Firma heiratet and Meyer aus Berlin are still our best films."

In 1915, with his company Cewe-Films, and in 1920/21, with Carl-Wilhelm-Film GmbH, he also operated as his own producer. In 1917 and 1918 he made a number of films in Hungarian. Carl Wilhelm remained a sought-after director until the end of the silent film period. He then ceased to work almost entirely - he is last heard of as a production assistant in 1935. He left Germany for Vienna after the coming to power of the Nazi party in 1933 and, already ill, joined his son Wolfgang in London where he died in 1936.

== Filmography ==
=== As director ===
- 1909: Ein vergnügter Wintertag im Berliner Grunewald - also actor
- 1911: Leibeigenschaft (with Leo Peukert)
- 1912: Der abgeführte Liebhaber
- 1912: Brüderchens Heldentat
- 1912: Das elfte Gebot: Du sollst nicht stören Deines Nächsten Flitterwochen
- 1912: Die Hand des Schicksals (with Leopoldine Konstantin) – co-director with Heinrich Bolten-Baeckers
- 1912: Leo, der Witwenfreund / Leo als Witwenfreund (with Leo Peukert)
- 1912: Mama: Roman aus dem Leben einer Schauspielerin
- 1912: Die Nachbarskinder – co-director with Heinrich Bolten-Baeckers
- 1912/13: Leo, der schwarze Münchhausen (with Leo Peukert)
- 1913: Die Kunstschützin (with Leo Peukert) – also actor; co-director with Heinrich Bolten-Baeckers
- 1913: Der Shylock von Krakau (with Rudolph Schildkraut); screenplay: Felix Salten) – also actor)
- 1913: Tangofieber
- The Firm Gets Married (1914) (with Ernst Lubitsch, Ressel Orla)
- 1914: Fräulein Leutnant / Fräulein Feldgrau (also screenplay together with Walter Turszinsky)
- 1914: Die Marketenderin (with Else Eckersberg; also screenplay together with Arno Arndt)
- 1914: Der Stolz der Firma. Die Geschichte eines Lehrlings (with Ernst Lubitsch)
- 1915: Der Barbier von Flimersdorf (with Oscar Sabo) – also screenplay
- 1915: Berlin im Kriegsjahr (documentary film produced by Erich Pommer on commission from the Verein der Zentralstelle für den Fremdenverkehr)
- 1915: Carl und Carla (with Lisa Weise)
- 1915: Frau Annas Pilgerfahrt. Episode aus dem Wien-Berliner Leben 1914/15 – also screenplay together with Julius Wilhelm, and production
- 1916: Sami, der Seefahrer
- 1916: Ein Zirkusmädel
- 1917: Albert läßt sich scheiden
- 1917: Doktor Lauffen
- 1917: Az elátkozott család
- 1917: Fabricius úr leánya
- 1917: Fekete gyémántok
- 1918: A Gazdag szegények
- 1918: A Szerelem bolondjai
- 1919: Die Himmelskönigin / Du meine Himmelskönigin (with Margarete Schön, Gustav Adolf Semler) – also screenplay
- The Duty to Live (1919)
- 1919: Prinzessin Tatjana oder Wenn ein Weib den Weg verliert
- The Yellow Death (1920, Part I) (with Gustav Adolf Semler, Rosa Valetti)
- The Yellow Death (1920, Part II) (with Ernst Deutsch, Margarete Schön, Gustav Adolf Semler)
- Respectable Women (1920)
- The Eyes of the World (1920) (with Conrad Veidt) – also screenplay together with Ruth Goetz, and production
- 1920: Das Götzenbild der Wahrheit
- 1920: Der langsame Tod / Die nach Liebe schmachten (with Lucie Höflich, Eduard von Winterstein) – also screenplay together with Ruth Goetz, production
- The Clan (1920) - also screenplay together with Ruth Goetz, production
- 1921: The House of Torment – also screenplay and production
- 1921: Das gestohlene Millionenrezept – also production
- Country Roads and the Big City (1921) / Musikanten des Lebens (with Carola Toelle, Fritz Kortner, Conrad Veidt) – also production
- 1921: Der Liebling der Frauen – also production
- 1921: Perlen bedeuten Tränen / Tragische Abenteuer des Japaners Dr. Rao (with Albert Steinrück, Aud Egede-Nissen)
- 1921: Unrecht Gut
- 1921/22: Menschenopfer (with Hans Albers)
- Lumpaci the Vagabond (1922) (with Hans Albers) – also screenplay
- Debit and Credit (1924) (with Theodor Loos, Olga Chekhova) - also screenplay, together with Karl Figdor based on the novel by Gustav Freytag
- Nick, King of the Chauffeurs (1925)
- Upstairs and Downstairs (1925)
- The Alternative Bride (1925) (with Ida Wüst)
- The Third Squadron (1926) (with Claire Rommer, Ralph Arthur Roberts, Camilla Spira) – also screenplay together with Bobby E. Lüthge
- 1926: Mikoschs letztes Abenteuer – also screenplay
- When the Young Wine Blossoms (1927) – also screenplay, together with Max Jungk based on a story by Bjørnstjerne Bjørnson
- It Attracted Three Fellows (1928) (with Hans Albers, Hertha von Walther)
- The Duty to Remain Silent (1928) (with Gustav Fröhlich, Kurt Gerron) – also screenplay
- 1928: Kaczmarek
- The Gypsy Chief (1929) – also screenplay
- Dear Homeland (1929) (with Renate Müller, Hans Brausewetter, Hans Albers, Lotte Werkmeister) - produced by Erich Engels
- Rooms to Let (1930) (with Henry Bender, Ida Wüst, Albert Paulig) – also screenplay, together with Bobby E. Lüthge
- The Firm Gets Married (1931) (with Ralph Arthur Roberts, Charlotte Ander, Oskar Karlweis, Ida Wüst, Theo Lingen, Julius Falkenstein, Trude Hesterberg)

=== Other ===
- 1910: Hexenlied (with Henny Porten; directed by Franz Porten) – actor
- 1910: Die Vernunft des Herzens (directed by Charles Decroix) – actor
- 1910: Pro patria. Ein Unterseebootsfilm (with Leo Peukert; directed by Charles Decroix) – director's assistant
- 1910/11: Vater und Sohn (directed by Walter Schmidthässler) – actor
- 1911: Das Herz einer Gattin (directed by Charles Decroix) – actor
- 1913/14: Eine venezianische Nacht (directed by Max Reinhardt) – director's assistant
- 1932: Spell of the Looking Glass (directed by Frank Wisbar) – "collective direction", together with Herbert Ephraim
- 1935: J'aime toutes les femmes (directed by Carl Lamač) – production assistant
