= Princess Suwarin =

1923 film directed by Johannes Guter

- Directed by: Johannes Guter
- Written by: Ludwig Wolff (novel); Thea von Harbou
- Produced by: Erich Pommer
- Starring: Lil Dagover; Heinrich Schroth; Xenia Desni
- Cinematography: Otto Baecker; Günther Krampf
- Production company: Decla-Bioscop
- Distributed by: UFA
- Release date: 12 April 1923
- Running time: 105 minutes
- Country: Germany
- Languages: Silent; German intertitles

Princess Suwarin (German: Die Prinzessin Suwarin) is a 1923 German silent film directed by Johannes Guter and starring Lil Dagover, Heinrich Schroth and Xenia Desni. It was shot at the Babelsberg Studios of Decla-Bioscop in Berlin. The film's sets were designed by the art director Erich Czerwonski.

== Cast ==
- Lil Dagover as Tina Bermonte
- Heinrich Schroth
- Xenia Desni as Princess Suvarin
- Alfred Abel as Kipman
- Hans Scholl
- Rudolf Klein-Rogge as Cyrus Proctor
- Lucie Mannheim as Esterka Kipman
- Anton Edthofer as Mniewski
- Heinrich Gotho
- Guido Herzfeld
- Ernst Pröckl
- Yuri Yurovsky

== Bibliography ==
- Hardt, Ursula. From Caligari to California: Erich Pommer's Life in the International Film Wars. Berghahn Books, 1996.
