= Murders in the Greenstreet =

1921 film directed by Johannes Guter

- Directed by: Johannes Guter
- Written by: Erwin Baron; Friedrich Eisenlohr
- Produced by: Erich Pommer
- Starring: Lil Dagover
- Cinematography: Erich Nitzschmann
- Production company: Decla-Bioscop
- Distributed by: UFA
- Release date: 27 December 1921
- Country: Germany
- Languages: Silent; German intertitles

Murders in the Greenstreet (German: Der Mord in der Greenstreet) is a 1921 German silent film directed by Johannes Guter and starring Lil Dagover.

The film's art direction was by Franz Seemann.

== Cast ==
In alphabetical order

- Erwin Baron
- Lil Dagover
- Hugo Flink
- Emil Heyse
- Sophie Pagay
- Vasilij Vronski
- Yuri Yurovsky

== Bibliography ==
- Hans-Michael Bock and Tim Bergfelder. The Concise Cinegraph: An Encyclopedia of German Cinema. Berghahn Books.
