= Xenia Desni =

Russian actress (1894–1962)

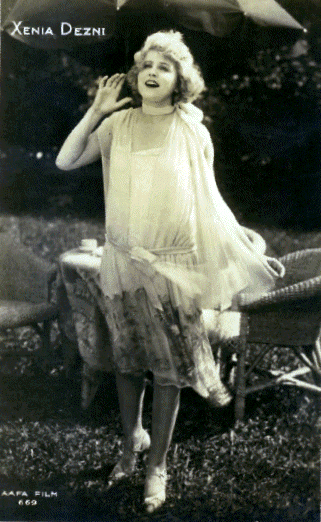
- Born: Ksenia Desnytska; 19 January 1894; Oster, Russian Empire
- Died: 27 May 1962 (aged 68); Roquefort-les-Pins, France
- Occupation: Actress
- Years active: 1921–1940 (film)
- Children: Tamara Desni

Xenia Desni (Ukrainian: Ксенія Десні; 19 January 1894 – 27 May 1962) was a silent screen era actress who predominantly appeared in German films.

== Early life ==
Densi was born Ksenia Desnytska in Oster, Russian Empire (now Ukraine). She and her family fled the Russian Revolution. They first moved to Constantinople, where she began her acting career in Vaudeville. She later moved to Berlin. She later was involved in films directed by Johannes Guter.

== Career ==
Desni began her successful career at the beginning of the 1920s with the movie Sappho, followed by a number of successful productions such as Leap Into Life, Die Prinzessin Suwarin, Wilhelm Tell, Die Andere, Ein Walzertraum, Familie Schimek, and Madame wagt einen Seitensprung.

Her career declined shortly after the advent of sound, after which she appeared in only one film, Kriminalkommissar Eyck.

She was the mother of actress Tamara Desni. Her daughter became a star of British films during the 1930s and 1940s.

== Selected filmography ==
- The Black Panther (1921)
- Parisian Women (1921)
- Weib und Palette 1921)
- Könnyved, der große Unbekannte (1922)
- Barmaid (1922)
- The Call of Destiny (1922)
- William Tell (1923)
- The Princess Suwarin (1923)
- Count Cohn (1923)
- Leap Into Life (1924)
- The Tower of Silence (1924)
- The Other Woman (1924)
- A Waltz Dream (1925)
- The Found Bride (1925)
- The Pink Diamond (1926)
- The Boxer's Bride (1926)
- Kissing Is No Sin (1926)
- The Schimeck Family (1926)
- Nixchen (1926)
- Rhenish Girls and Rhenish Wine (1927)
- Madame Dares an Escapade (1927)
- Radio Magic (1927)
- The Champion of the World (1927)
- Marie's Soldier (1927)
- A Girl of the People (1927)
- The Orchid Dancer (1928)
- Archduke John (1929)
- Commissioner Eyck (1940)
