= The Adventure of Mr. Philip Collins =

1925 film directed by Johannes Guter

- Directed by: Johannes Guter
- Written by: Frank Heller (novel); Robert Liebmann
- Produced by: Erich Pommer
- Starring: Georg Alexander; Ossi Oswalda; Elisabeth Pinajeff; Alexander Murski
- Cinematography: Günther Krampf
- Production company: UFA
- Distributed by: UFA
- Release date: 11 December 1925
- Running time: 99 minutes
- Country: Germany
- Languages: Silent; German intertitles

The Adventure of Mr. Philip Collins (German: Herrn Filip Collins Abenteuer) is a 1925 German silent comedy film directed by Johannes Guter and starring Georg Alexander, Ossi Oswalda and Elisabeth Pinajeff. It was one of two comedy films with which Guter followed up his more melancholy The Tower of Silence. It was shot at UFA's Babelsberg Studios. The film's art direction was by Rudi Feld. It premiered at the Gloria-Palast in Berlin.

== Cast ==
- Georg Alexander as Filip Collin
- Ossi Oswalda as Daisy Cuffler
- Elisabeth Pinajeff as Alice Walters
- Adolf E. Licho as President Cuffler, Daisys Vater
- Alexander Murski as Reeder John Walters, ALices Onkel
- Erich Kaiser-Titz as Austin Bateson
- Paul Biensfeldt as Austins Bruder
- Karl Victor Plagge
- Hans Junkermann
- Karl Platen

== Bibliography ==
- Kreimeier, Klaus (1999). The Ufa Story: A History of Germany's Greatest Film Company, 1918–1945. Berkeley: University of California Press. ISBN 978-0-520-22069-0.
- Jacobsen, Wolfgang . Babelsberg: das Filmstudio. Argon, 1994.
