= The Call of Destiny (1922 film) =

1922 film directed by Johannes Guter

- Directed by: Johannes Guter
- Written by: Johannes Brandt
- Produced by: Erich Pommer; Albert Pommer
- Starring: Xenia Desni; Fritz Kortner; Ernst Hofmann
- Cinematography: Fritz Arno Wagner
- Production company: Dea-Film
- Distributed by: UFA
- Release date: 27 November 1922
- Running time: 50 minutes
- Country: Germany
- Languages: Silent; German intertitles

The Call of Destiny (German: Der Ruf des Schicksals) is a 1922 German silent film directed by Johannes Guter and starring Xenia Desni, Fritz Kortner, and Ernst Hofmann.

== Cast ==
- Xenia Desni
- Fritz Kortner
- Ernst Hofmann
- Frida Richard
- Rudolf Lettinger
- Karl Günther
- Maria Forescu
- Yuri Yurovsky

== Bibliography ==
- Krautz, Alfred (1984). International Directory of Cinematographers, Set- and Costume Designers in Film. Vol. 4. Munich: Saur. ISBN 978-3-598-21434-9.
