= Erich Czerwonski =

German production designer (1889–1940)

- Born: 3 October 1889; Berlin, German Empire
- Died: 1940 (aged 50–51); Germany
- Occupation: Art director
- Years active: 1921-1940 (film)

Erich Czerwonski (1889–1940) was a German art director. He designed the sets for around a hundred productions during his career. He died in 1940 after being struck by a train during a blackout.

== Filmography ==
- The Black Panther (1921)
- Barmaid (1922)
- Phantom (1922)
- Lust for Life (1922)
- A Glass of Water (1923)
- The Princess Suwarin (1923)
- The Expulsion (1923)
- The Grand Duke's Finances (1924)
- My Leopold (1924)
- The Gentleman Without a Residence (1925)
- The Telephone Operator (1925)
- The Boxer's Bride (1926)
- The Fiddler of Florence (1926)
- The Great Leap (1927)
- His Late Excellency (1927)
- The Woman in the Cupboard (1927)
- Eva and the Grasshopper (1927)
- Grand Hotel (1927)
- You Walk So Softly (1928)
- Panic (1928)
- The Lady with the Mask (1928)
- Scandal in Baden-Baden (1929)
- Favorite of Schonbrunn (1929)
- Never Trust a Woman (1930)
- Delicatessen (1930)
- The Trunks of Mr. O.F. (1931)
- Chauffeur Antoinette (1932)
- Five from the Jazz Band (1932)
- A Tremendously Rich Man (1932)
- Trenck (1932)
- There Is Only One Love (1933)
- The Big Bluff (1933)
- Zwei im Sonnenschein (1933)
- Such a Rascal (1934)
- Miss Madame (1934)
- Love Conquers All (1934)
- Hearts are Trumps (1934)
- Rivalen der Luft (1934)
- Es tut sich was um Mitternacht (1934)
- ...heute abend bei mir (1934)
- Miss Liselott (1934)
- Ich sehne mich nach dir (1934)
- A Waltz for You (1934)
- Da stimmt was nicht (1934)
- Light Cavalry (1935)
- Petersburger Nächte (1935)
- Warum lügt Fräulein Käthe? (1935)
- Lärm um Weidemann (1935)
- Game on Board (1936)
- Herbstmanöver (1936)
- Scandal at the Fledermaus (1936)
- Heiratsinstitut Ida & Co (1937)
- Dangerous Crossing (1937)
- Tango Notturno (1937)
- Mädchen für alles (1937)
- Gordian the Tyrant (1937)
- Der Lachdoktor (1937)
- Schüsse in Kabine 7 (1938)
- Shadows Over St. Pauli (1938)
- Freight from Baltimore (1938)
- The Secret Lie (1938)
- Secret Code LB 17 (1938)
- Kennwort Machin (1939)
- Midsummer Night's Fire (1939)
- Uproar in Damascus (1939)
- Hochzeit mit Hindernissen (1939)
- The Merciful Lie (1939)
- Weißer Flieder (1940)
- Achtung! Feind hört mit! (1940)
- My Daughter Doesn't Do That (1940)
- Herz ohne Heimat (1940)

== Bibliography ==
- Kreimeier, Klaus. The Ufa Story: A History of Germany's Greatest Film Company, 1918-1945. University of California Press, 1999.
