= The Kwannon of Okadera =

1920 film

- Directed by: Carl Froelich
- Written by: Ludwig Wolff
- Produced by: Erich Pommer
- Starring: Lil Dagover; Werner Krauss
- Production company: Uco-Film
- Distributed by: Decla-Bioscop
- Release date: 2 December 1920
- Country: Germany
- Languages: Silent; German intertitles

The Kwannon of Okadera (German: Die Kwannon von Okadera) is a 1920 German silent film directed by Carl Froelich and starring Lil Dagover and Werner Krauss. Produced by Erich Pommer of Decla-Bioscop it was shot at the Babelsberg Studios in Berlin and premiered in the city's Marmorhaus.

== Cast ==
In alphabetical order

- Max Adalbert
- Albert Bennefeld
- Lil Dagover as Kwannon
- Robert Forster-Larrinaga as Georg, Harlanders Sohn
- Hanna Gath
- Ernst Gronau
- Leonhard Haskel
- Hans Junkermann
- Werner Krauss as Harlander, Grossindustrieller
- Margarete Kupfer
- Alexander Köckert
- Nils Landberg
- Marija Leiko as Ingele von Geortz
- Paul Morgan
- Alice Reppert
- Karl Römer
- Lillibel Schroth
- Walter Supper
- Otto Treptow
- Alina von Mielewska
- Elsa Wagner
- Emmy Wyda

== Bibliography ==
- Hardt, Ursula. From Caligari to California: Erich Pommer's life in the International Film Wars. Berghahn Books, 1996.
