= Barmaid (film) =

1922 film directed by Johannes Guter

- Directed by: Johannes Guter
- Written by: Johannes Guter
- Produced by: Erich Pommer
- Starring: Xenia Desni; Paul Hartmann; Charlotte Ander
- Cinematography: Fritz Arno Wagner; Erich Waschneck
- Production company: Decla-Bioscop
- Distributed by: UFA
- Release date: 23 February 1922
- Country: Germany
- Languages: Silent; German intertitles

Barmaid (German: Bardame) is a 1922 German silent film directed by Johannes Guter and starring Xenia Desni, Paul Hartmann, and Charlotte Ander.

The film's sets were designed by the art director Erich Czerwonski.

== Cast ==
- Xenia Desni as Leontine Friese
- Paul Hartmann as Günther Romberg
- Charlotte Ander as Hanni Schrader
- Robert Scholz as Erich von Wendler
- Hermann Thimig as Willy Weber
- Anton Edthofer as Dr. Harry Dorn
- Wilhelm Diegelmann
- Harry Dorn
- Leonhard Haskel
- Charles Puffy
- Wally Koch
- Rudolf Lettinger
- Max Neumann
- Lina Paulsen
- Lydia Potechina
- Frida Richard
- Marie von Buelow
- Elsa Wagner
- Yuri Yurovsky

== Bibliography ==
- Hardt, Ursula (1996). From Caligari to California: Erich Pommer's Life in the International Film Wars. Providence: Berghahn Books. ISBN 978-1-57181-930-7.
