= Once You Give Away Your Heart =

1929 film directed by Johannes Guter

- Directed by: Johannes Guter
- Written by: Robert Liebmann
- Based on: Der Vagabund vom Äquator by Ludwig von Wohl
- Produced by: Günther Stapenhorst
- Starring: Lilian Harvey; Igo Sym; Harry Halm
- Cinematography: Fritz Arno Wagner
- Music by: Willy Rosen; Willy Schmidt-Gentner
- Production company: UFA
- Distributed by: UFA
- Release dates: 28 November 1929 (silent); 17 January 1930 (sound)
- Running time: 85 minutes
- Country: Germany
- Language: German

Once You Give Away Your Heart (German: Wenn du einmal dein Herz verschenkst) is a 1929 German comedy film directed by Johannes Guter and starring Lilian Harvey, Igo Sym, and Harry Halm. Made at the time of the conversion to sound film, it was released in both sound and silent versions.

The film's art direction was by Heinz Fenchel and Jacek Rotmil. It was shot at the Babelsberg Studios and on location in Tenerife and on board a cargo steamer sailing from Hamburg.

== Synopsis ==
A young woman escapes from the banana plantation in Borneo where she lives and travels on a cargo ship to Europe.

== Cast ==
- Lilian Harvey as Dolly
- Igo Sym as Brun
- Harry Halm as Bobby
- Karl Platen as Hinnerk, Steuermann
- Alexander Sascha as Thorp
- Valeria Blanka as Elegante Frau
- Rudolf Biebrach as Kapitän
- Wolfgang Kuhle as Schiffsjunge
- Fritz Schmuck as Sörensen
- Erika Dannhoff as Kindermädchen
- Michael von Newlinsky

== Bibliography ==
- Bock, Hans-Michael; Bergfelder, Tim, eds. (2009). The Concise Cinegraph: Encyclopaedia of German Cinema. New York: Berghahn Books. ISBN 978-1-57181-655-9.
