= Albert Pommer =

German film producer

- Born: 16 February 1886; Hildesheim, German Empire
- Died: 1946 (aged 59–60)
- Occupation: Producer
- Years active: 1915–1927 (film)

Albert Pommer (1886 – 1946) was a German film producer. He was the elder brother of Erich Pommer, the head of the leading German studio UFA during the 1920s. Albert worked on a number of films distributed by UFA. He had earlier been appointed by his brother an executive of the newly formed Decla Film in 1915.

== Selected filmography ==
- Revenge of the Bandits (1921)
- Parisian Women (1921)
- The Devil's Chains (1921)
- Lust for Life (1922)
- The Call of Destiny (1922)
- The Chain Clinks (1923)
- The Buddenbrooks (1923)
- The Other Woman (1924)
- Two and a Lady (1926)
- Two Under the Stars (1927)

== Bibliography ==
- Hardt, Ursula. From Caligari to California: Erich Pommer's Life in the International Film Wars. Berghahn Books, 1996.
