= People of the Sea =

People of the Sea may refer to:

- People of the Sea (novel), a 1993 novel in the First North Americans series
- People of the Sea (film), a 1925 German silent drama film

Other

- Ethnic groups historically known for their fishing and boat building expertise/profession, such as the Serer people, etc.
- Sea Peoples, hypothetical confederation associated with the end of the Bronze Age in the Mediterranean
