= Decla Film =

German film company

Decla-Film (later Decla-Bioscop after 1920) was a German film production and distribution company of the silent era, founded by Erich Pommer and Fritz Holz in February 1915.

It was formed out of the assets of the German branch of the French film production company Éclair, Deutsche Éclair, which had been confiscated by the German government at the start of World War One. Pommer had previously been director of the Austrian branch of Éclair in Vienna. The firm merged with Deutsche Bioskop AG in Spring 1920, and with Ufa in October 1921.

Decla and Decla-Bioscop produced some of the most well-known films of the Weimar era, including Homunculus, Die Pest in Florenz, The Spiders, The Cabinet of Dr. Caligari, Destiny, Phantom and Die Nibelungen.

== Founding ==
In 1910 Erich Pommer had become director of the Austrian branch of the French company Gaumont in Vienna. At the same time, another French film production company, Éclair, which also sold its own brand of movie camera equipment, was looking to increase its presence in Austria. Pommer left Gaumont and established the Austrian subsidiary branch of Éclair in 1913 with Marcel Vandal and Charles Jourjon, answering directly to Paris and not through Berlin. At the time the German branch of Éclair (Deutsche Éclair) in Berlin was being run by Pommer's British friend Joseph ("Joe") Powell. (Note: It seems that when war broke out Joseph Powell, like 4,000 other British and Commonwealth civilian males, was sent to Ruhleben internment camp near Spandau as an enemy alien. He was elected Camp Captain, and organised an "effective internal administration for the camp." He also set up a lending library and set up a large number of clubs, societies and cultural associations to cater for the needs of the inmates. He was not popular with everyone, however. The inmates included nearly 250 teachers and lecturers who formed the camp's Arts and Science Union, mainly upper middle class university graduates, who "looked down on him because he was a self-made businessmen rather than a man of education or independent wealth. Frequent criticism was made of his ‘brusqueness of manner’ and ‘lightning method’ of addressing fellow prisoners, and at times he was even accused of being unpatriotic or pro-German." He was described by a university professor as a "noisy, bouncing, agitated, shifty man, unable to express himself accurately by speaking or in writing... He was an arrogant, rude, even violent, unscrupulous, untruthful, uncompromising, jealous, intolerant, distrustful opportunist. He was a bully and a tyrant. In a word, his valuations were German." Powell remained in Germany after the war.) When World War One broke out in August 1914 Pommer returned to Germany and won the Iron Cross in France in October 1914.

From the outset of the First World War, foreign production companies and their films were banned in Germany, and their entire assets confiscated. This included Gaumont, Pathé and Éclair. Despite being stationed at the front, Pommer through his co-founder Fritz Holz, a Berlin film distributor, made a successful bid for the rights to Éclair's German assets. (Note: Fritz Holz's son was awarded the Iron Cross, probably in December 1914.) They formed the Decla-Film-Gesellschaft Holz & Co. in February 1915. Holz resigned in mid-1915, but Decla kept the name even after Holz left the company.

With the company being guided by Pommer's wife Gertrud, Erich Morawsky and/or Carl Wilhelm who also directed a number of its early films., Decla acquired the lease of the studio at no. 9 Franz Josef-Straße, originally built by Continental-Kunstfilm, part of the Weissensee Studios. Decla produced its first 12 films here in 1915.

Pommer was transferred to the Russian front later in 1915, was wounded in the leg, and returned to Berlin in 1916. After being released from hospital in summer 1916 he trained recruits before joining Bild- und Filmamt (BuFA, Picture and Film department) at the German War Ministry in 1917, the forerunner of UFA. He was transferred as a sergeant to Romania in summer 1917, involved in military censorship of stage and film.

== Post-war mergers ==
Under the leadership of Erich Pommer, Decla emerged as one of the leading German film companies of the early Weimar era. Assuming control of Meinert-Film, it appointed Rudolf Meinert to oversee production.

Through Decla, Fritz Lang made his directorial debut with the silent film Halbblut in 1919 after initially being hired as a screenwriter by Pommer in 1918. At the small 'Decla-Atelier' in the Weissensee Studios during winter 1919/1920 it produced the expressionist film The Cabinet of Dr. Caligari, directed by Robert Wiene.

In March/April 1920, Decla merged with rival company Deutsche Bioskop AG becoming known as Decla-Bioscop. Deutsche Bioskop AG was originally founded in 1902 as Deutsche Bioscope GmbH (note spelling) by Jules Greenbaum and sold to Carl Moritz Schleussner in 1908. Deutsche Bioskop AG had constructed a large, modern studio from 1911 at Babelsberg in Potsdam, right outside of Berlin, and production was now concentrated there.

The following year (1921), under pressure from its creditors at the Deutsche Bank, Decla-Bioscop became a part of UFA – Universum Film AG, which had been secretly formed by the German government for propaganda purposes in late 1917. The company was absorbed in October 1921 into the giant film concern, which dominated German cinema in the interwar years. A rival, and higher offer, from National-Film was rejected. Erich Pommer was appointed as head of production for the whole outfit. Danish filmmakers such as Benjamin Christensen (Seine Frau, die Unbekannte, 1923) worked here as well.

Although Decla was now a part of UFA, the success its films had enjoyed led to the continued use of the brand name for releases for some time. As late as 1924 Fritz Lang's Die Nibelungen, a big-budget prestige UFA production, was released as a Decla-Bioscop Film.

Deutsche Bioscop operated independently as one of Ufa's many film production departments until 1 June 1924, when it merged with Ufa's central administration, and its identity was lost.

After being blamed for the financial losses incurred during the Parufamet agreement from 1925, Pommer resigned from Ufa in January 1926 and worked in the USA for Paramount Pictures and MGM for 18 months. When the right-wing publisher Alfred Hugenberg took over Ufa, Pommer returned to Ufa as a producer until the Nazi takeover in 1933, when he migrated permanently to the USA.

== Creative teams ==
Significant members of Decla-Film and Decla-Bioscop that continued to work with and through UFA include Fritz Lang, F.W Murnau, Ludwig Berger, Thea von Harbou, Karl Freund, Otto Hunte, Carl Mayer, and Hermann Warm. These directors and their creative teams of photographers, set designers, dressers and musicians assembled by Pommer helped pave the foundation for the future of Weimar cinema.

== Filmography ==
=== Decla-Film (1915–1920) ===
Some articles about the following films may attribute them to Decla-Bioskop or other production companies, although they were made by Decla-Film before the merger in March/April 1920.

- Der Glaube siegt (Victory of Faith) (1915)
- Brot (1915)
- Die Masuren (1915)
- Carl und Carla (1915)
- Die Gefährliche Kinderkrankheit (1915)
- de:Der Barbier von Filmersdorf (première, Marmorhaus, 11 June 1915)
- O diese Männer (1915)
- Sein Seitensprung (His Affair) (1915)
- Die Goldquelle (The Source of Gold) (1915)
- Ein Schrei in der Nacht (1915) (Sherlock Holmes)
- Der Herr ohne Wohnung (The Gentleman Without a Residence) (October 1915)
- Das Gewissen (1915) Dir. Alwin Neuss
- Die Schaffnerin der Linie sechs (November 1915)
- Ein Unbeschriebenes Blatt (1915)
- Das Gewissen (1916)
- Die Stimme des Toten (1916)
- Homunculus (1916/1920) (Note: Homunculus was originally made in 6 parts by Deutsche Bioscop Gmbh, released from June 1916 to January 1917. After the merger with Decla-Film in May 1920 it was edited down to a more compact form in 3 parts, and re-released in August 1920. Until 2014 only part IV from 1916 survived. A restored version was completed and shown in August 2014.)
- Komtesse Hella (1916)
- Dad Lied des Lebens (1916)
- Dir Fremde (1917)
- Die gute Partie (1917)
- Der Weg, der zur Verdammnis führt, 1.Teil - Das Schicksal der Aenne Wolter (1918)
- Halbblut (1919)
- Die Insel der Glücklichen (1919)
- Sir Arne's Treasure (1919)
- The Spiders - Episode 1: The Golden Sea (1919)
- Das ewige Rätsel (1919)
- Die Pest in Florenz (1919)
- Harakiri (1919)
- Die Frau mit den Orchideen (1919)
- Karlchen als Oberkellner (1919)
- Secret of the Monastery (1920)
- Nachtgestalten (1920)
- Karin Ingmarsdotter (1920)
- The Spiders- Episode 2: The Diamond Ship (1920)
- The Cabinet of Dr. Caligari (26 February 1920)
- The Merry-Go-Round (27 February 1920)

=== Decla-Bioskop (March/April 1920–October 1921) ===
- Johannes Goth (May 1920)
- Sieger Tod (1920)
- The Woman in Heaven (1920)
- The Head of Janus (1920)
- Genuine: The Tragedy of a Vampire (1920)
- Evening - Night - Morning (1920)
- Maulwürfe (1920)
- Der siebente Tag (1920)
- Die Tophar-Mumie (1920)
- Die Jagd nach dem Tode (1920)
- Die Jagd nach dem Tode 2.Teil: Die verbotene Stadt (1920)
- Der Richter von Zalamea (1920)
- Das Blut der Ahnen (1920)
- Erotikon (1920)
- Das Zeichen des Malayen (1920)
- Die Nacht der Königin Isabeau (1920)
- Die Kwannon von Okadera (1920)
- Das Haupt des Juarez (1920)
- Die Augen der Maske (1920)
- Tötendes Schweigen (1920)
- The Phantom Carriage (1921)
- Das Geheimnis von Bombay (1921)
- Toteninsel (1921)
- The Thirteen of Steel (1921)
- Vier um die Frau (1921)
- The Medium (1921)
- Die Jagd nach dem Tode - 3. Teil: Der Mann im Dunkel (1921)
- Die Jagd nach dem Tode - 4. Teil: Die Goldmine von Sar-Khin (1921)
- Der Einäugige (1921)
- Treibende Kraft (1921)
- The Haunted Castle (1921)
- Hazard (1921)
- Der Erbe der van Diemen (1921)
- Um den Sohn (1921)
- Playing with Fire (1921)
- Das Mädchen, das wartet (1921)
- Unrecht Gut (1921)
- Der Roman der Christine von Herre (September 1921)

=== As part of Ufa from October 1921 ===
- Destiny (October 1921)
- Die schwarze Pantherin (October 1921)
- Violet (November 1921)
- Irrende Seelen (1921)
- Zirkus des Lebens (1921)
- The Death in the Greenstreet (1921)
- Der ewige Fluch (1921)
- Könnyved, der große Unbekannte (1922
- Die Intrigen der Madame de la Pommeraye (1922)
- Das Geld auf der Strasse (1922)
- Bardame (1922)
- Phantom (1922)
- Sterbende Völker - 1. Heimat in Not (1922)
- Sterbende Völker - 2. Brennendes Meer (1922)
- Intimitäten aus dem Leben deutscher Schlangen (1922)
- Der steinerne Reiter (1923)
- One Glass of Water (1923)
- The Princess Suwarin (1923)
- Der zweite Schuß (1923)
- Seine Frau, die Unbekannte (1923)
- Die Austreibung (1923)
- Der verlorene Schuh (1923)
- Der Wetterwart (1923)
- Leap Into Life (1924)
- Die Nibelungen: Siegfried (1924)
- Die Nibelungen: Kriemhild's Revenge (1924)
- Ein Walzertraum (1925)
- Der rosa Diamant (1926)

== Bibliography ==
- Hampicke, Evelyn (2015). "Jules Greenbaum". CineGraph – Lexikon zum deutschsprachigen Film (in German). Cinegraph.de. Archived from the original on 5 May 2016.
- Hardt, Ursula (1996). From Caligari to California: Erich Pommer's Life in the International Film Wars. Berghahn Books. ISBN 9781571819307.
- Kreimeier, Klaus (1999). The UFA Story: A History of Germany's Greatest Film Company, 1918-1945. University of California Press. ISBN 9780520220690.
- Stibbe, Matthew (2004). Macleod, Jenny; Purseigle, Paul (eds.). "A Community at War: British Civilian Internees at the Ruhleben camp in Germany, 1914-1918". Uncovered Fields: Perspectives in War Studies. History of Warfare, Vol. 20. Leiden, Boston: Brill. S2CID 162157090.
- Prinzler, Hans Helmut (2016). Chronik des deutschen Films 1895-1994 (in German). Springer-Verlag. ISBN 9783476035851.
