= The Tophar Mummy =

1920 film

- Directed by: Johannes Guter
- Written by: Friedel Köhne
- Produced by: Erich Pommer
- Cinematography: Wilhelm Schwäbl
- Production company: Decla-Bioscop
- Distributed by: Decla-Bioscop
- Release date: 14 October 1920
- Country: Germany
- Languages: Silent; German intertitles

The Tophar Mummy (German: Die Tophar-Mumie) is a 1920 German silent film directed by Johannes Guter.

The film's art direction was by Franz Seemann.

== Cast ==
In alphabetical order

- Ellen Bargi as Lola Renaud
- Albert Bennefeld as Pablo Don Alvares
- Emil Heyse as Dr. Morris
- Rudolf Hofbauer as Aladar Werre
- Joseph Klein as Garnier
- Friedrich Kühne as Mastaba
- Paul Mederow as Vicomte de la Roche

== Bibliography ==
- Shulamith Behr, David Fanning & Douglas Jarman. Expressionism Reassessed. Manchester University Press, 1993.
