= Elisabeth Pinajeff =

Russian-German actress

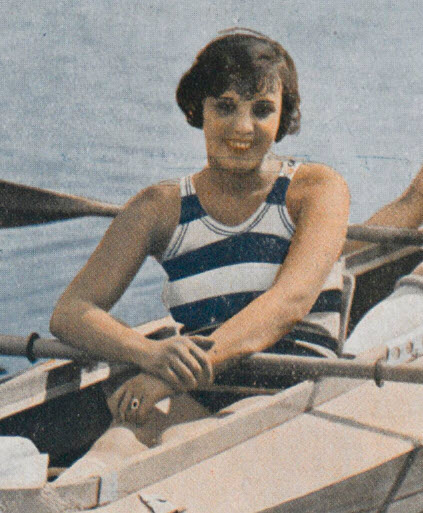
- Born: Elizabeta Sergeyevna Pinayeva; 17 April 1900; Yekaterinoslav, Russian Empire
- Died: 31 December 1995 (aged 95); Villemoisson-sur-Orge, Essonne, France
- Other name: Elisabeth von Pinajeff
- Occupation: Actress
- Years active: 1922–1938 (film)
- Spouse: Alexander Binder (1928–29)

Elisabeth Pinajeff (born Elizabeta Sergeyevna Pinayeva; Russian: Елизавета Сергеевна Пинаева, 17 April 1900 – 31 December 1995) was a Russian-German actress.

She was implicated in the Ballets roses scandal of the 1950s, when prominent French people were accused of sexually abusing teenage girls.

== Selected filmography ==
- Count Cohn (1923)
- Darling of the King (1924)
- The Brigantine of New York (1924)
- The Adventure of Mr. Philip Collins (1925)
- People of the Sea (1925)
- The Three Mannequins (1926)
- The Laughing Husband (1926)
- I Liked Kissing Women (1926)
- Lace (1926)
- Rinaldo Rinaldini (1927)
- Rhenish Girls and Rhenish Wine (1927)
- Love on Skis (1928)
- The Gallant Hussar (1928)
- A Better Master (1928)
- Mikosch Comes In (1928)
- The Sinner (1928)
- The Lady and the Chauffeur (1928)
- A Mother's Love (1929)
- The Midnight Waltz (1929)
- Rooms to Let (1930)
- Tingel-Tangel (1930)
- Shadows of the Underworld (1931)
- The Four from Bob 13 (1932)
- Madame Makes Her Exit (1932)
- The Triangle of Fire (1932)

== Bibliography ==
- Prawer, S.S. Between Two Worlds: The Jewish Presence in German and Austrian Film, 1910–1933. Berghahn Books, 2007.
