= Rooms to Let =

1930 film directed by Carl Wilhelm

- Directed by: Carl Wilhelm
- Written by: Bobby E. Lüthge; Carl Wilhelm
- Produced by: Erich Engels
- Starring: Lucie Englisch; Elisabeth Pinajeff; Kurt Vespermann; Ida Wüst
- Cinematography: Gustave Preiss
- Music by: Paul Dessau
- Production company: Erich Engels-Film
- Distributed by: Erich Engels-Film
- Release date: 14 January 1930
- Country: Germany
- Languages: Silent; German intertitles

Rooms to Let (German: Ruhiges Heim mit Küchenbenutzung) is a 1930 German silent comedy film directed by Carl Wilhelm and starring Lucie Englisch, Elisabeth Pinajeff and Kurt Vespermann. The film's art direction was by Max Heilbronner and Erich Zander. Its fully translated title is Rooms to Let in a Quiet Home, with Use of a Kitchen. A domestic comedy, it was a late silent film just as the transition to sound was taking place.

== Cast ==
- Lucie Englisch as Lotte
- Elisabeth Pinajeff as Bella Donna
- Kurt Vespermann as Dr. Hans Weber
- Ida Wüst as Gattin
- Luise Bonn as Lola
- Henry Bender as Theodor Kannebach
- Johanna Ewald as Frau Piefke
- Heinrich Gotho as Herr Piefke
- Ellinor Gynt as Amalie Wasserstoff
- Ida Perry as Frau Amberg
- Fritz Schulz as Fritz Blitz
- Emmy Wyda as Fräulein Schmitz

== Bibliography ==
- Prawer, S.S. Between Two Worlds: The Jewish Presence in German and Austrian Film, 1910–1933. Berghahn Books, 2005.
