= Lust for Life (1922 film) =

1922 film directed by Johannes Guter

- Directed by: Johannes Guter
- Written by: Arthur Zickler
- Produced by: Albert Pommer
- Starring: Ressel Orla; Elga Brink; Walter Janssen
- Cinematography: Fritz Arno Wagner
- Production company: Dea-Film
- Release date: 29 March 1922
- Country: Germany
- Languages: Silent; German intertitles

Lust for Life (German: Lebenshunger) is a 1922 German silent romantic comedy film directed by Johannes Guter and starring Ressel Orla, Elga Brink, and Walter Janssen.

The film's sets were designed by the art director Erich Czerwonski.

== Cast ==
- Ressel Orla as Mabel Ray
- Elga Brink as Inge Wendhusen
- Walter Janssen as Johannes Düsedau
- Louis Brody as Jimmy
- Charles Puffy as Bobby
- Gustav May as Fred Düsedau
- Hans Merkwitz as Liebhaber
- Auguste Prasch-Grevenberg as Mutter Düsedau
- Joseph Römer as Konsul Wendhusen
- Ferry Sikla
- Max Adalbert
- Wilhelm Bendow

== Bibliography ==
- Krautz, Alfred (1984). International Directory of Cinematographers, Set- and Costume Designers in Film. Vol. 4. Munich: Saur. ISBN 978-3-598-21434-9.
