= Nick, King of the Chauffeurs =

1925 film directed by Carl Wilhelm

- Directed by: Carl Wilhelm
- Written by: Walter Jonas; Hans Wilhelm
- Starring: Carlo Aldini
- Cinematography: Nicolas Farkas; Arpad Viragh
- Production company: Phoebus Film
- Distributed by: Phoebus Film
- Release date: 1925
- Running time: 76 minutes
- Country: Germany
- Language: German

Nick, King of the Chauffeurs (German: Nick, der König der Chauffeure) is a 1925 German silent adventure film directed by Carl Wilhelm and starring Carlo Aldini.

The art direction was by Willi Herrmann.

== Cast ==
In alphabetical order

- Carlo Aldini as Chauffeur Nick
- Oreste Bilancia as Bankier Mac H. Fulton
- Adolphe Engers as Morris W. Stanley
- Olga Engl as Fürstin Baranhoff
- Robert Garrison as Konsul Napoleon Schwarz
- Lillian Hackett as Tochter Fay
- Hermann Picha as Wagenwäscher Pannewitz
- Berthold Rose as Polizeikommissar Borghetti
- Hans Wilhelm as Graf Tatistchew
