= About the Son =

1921 film

- Directed by: Frederik Larsen
- Written by: Artur Landsberger (novel)
- Produced by: Erich Pommer
- Starring: Carola Toelle; Ernst Hofmann; Ernst Stahl-Nachbaur; Frida Richard
- Cinematography: Willy Goldberger
- Production company: Decla-Bioscop
- Distributed by: Decla-Bioscop
- Release date: 13 May 1921
- Country: Germany
- Languages: Silent; German intertitles

About the Son (German: Um den Sohn) is a 1921 German silent drama film directed by Frederik Larsen and starring Carola Toelle, Ernst Hofmann and Ernst Stahl-Nachbaur. It premiered in Berlin on 13 May 1921.

== Cast ==
- Carola Toelle as Die Sekretärin
- Ernst Hofmann
- Ernst Stahl-Nachbaur
- Frida Richard
- Harry Berber
- Julius Brandt
- Ilka Grüning
- Hedda Kemp
- Albert Patry
- Charles Puffy
- Max Ruhbeck
- Robert Scholz
- Emmy Sturm
- Paul Westermeier
- Mary Zucker

== Bibliography ==
- Grange, William (2008). Cultural Chronicle of the Weimar Republic. Lanham, MD: Scarecrow Press. ISBN 978-0-8108-5967-8.
- Hardt, Ursula (1996). From Caligari to California: Erich Pommer's Life in the International Film Wars. Providence: Berghahn Books. ISBN 978-1-57181-930-7.
