= The Triangle of Fire =

1932 film

- Directed by: Edmond T. Gréville; Johannes Guter
- Written by: René Wild; Jean de Létraz
- Starring: Jean Angelo; André Roanne; Elisabeth Pinajeff
- Cinematography: Eduard Hoesch
- Music by: Casimir Oberfeld
- Production company: Gnom-Tonfilm
- Distributed by: Pathé Consortium Cinéma
- Release date: 2 December 1932
- Running time: 77 minutes
- Countries: France; Germany
- Language: French

The Triangle of Fire (French: Le triangle de feu) is a 1932 French-German crime film directed by Edmond T. Gréville and Johannes Guter and starring Jean Angelo, André Roanne and Elisabeth Pinajeff.

== Cast ==
- Jean Angelo as L'inspecteur Brémont
- André Roanne as L'inspecteur Charlet
- Elisabeth Pinajeff as Véra
- Renée Héribel as Irène
- Paul Ollivier as Maltère
- Maurice Rémy
- Marcel Merminod

== Bibliography ==
- Crisp, Colin. Genre, Myth and Convention in the French Cinema, 1929-1939. Indiana University Press, 2002.
