= Respectable Women =

1920 film directed by Carl Wilhelm

- Directed by: Carl Wilhelm
- Written by: Hans Gaus
- Starring: Ressel Orla; Heinrich Schroth; Olga Limburg
- Cinematography: Arpad Viragh
- Production company: Internationaler Filmvertrieb
- Release date: 18 September 1920
- Country: Germany
- Languages: Silent; German intertitles

Respectable Women (German: Anständige Frauen) is a 1920 German silent drama film directed by Carl Wilhelm and starring Ressel Orla, Heinrich Schroth and Olga Limburg.

The film's sets were designed by the art director Fritz Kraencke.

== Cast ==
- Erra Bognar
- Olga Limburg
- Paul Morgan
- Ressel Orla
- Heinrich Schroth
- Rosa Valetti

== Bibliography ==
- Grange, William. Cultural Chronicle of the Weimar Republic. Scarecrow Press, 2008.
