= Woman in the Jungle =

1931 film directed by Dimitri Buchowetzki

- Directed by: Dimitri Buchowetzki
- Written by: Henry Koster
- Based on: The Letter by W. Somerset Maugham.
- Starring: Charlotte Ander; Ernst Stahl-Nachbaur; Erich Ponto
- Cinematography: René Guissart
- Production company: Les Studios Paramount
- Distributed by: Parufamet
- Release date: January 8, 1931
- Running time: 63 minutes
- Country: United States
- Language: German

Woman in the Jungle (German: Weib im Dschungel) is a 1931 American drama film directed by Dimitri Buchowetzki and starring Charlotte Ander, Ernst Stahl-Nachbaur and Erich Ponto. It was shot at the Joinville Studios in Paris as the German-language version of The Letter. Such multiple-language versions were common during the early years of sound before dubbing became widespread. Like the original it was based on the 1927 play The Letter by W. Somerset Maugham.

== Synopsis ==
In British Malaya, the wife of an owner rubber plantation takes a lover amongst the colonial elite. When he tires of her and takes up with a Chinese woman instead, she shoots him dead. She now faces an investigation.

== Cast ==
- Charlotte Ander as Leslie Crosbie
- Ernst Stahl-Nachbaur as Robert Crosbie
- Erich Ponto as Joyce
- Robert Thoeren as Geoffrey Hammond
- Grace Chiang as Li-Ti
- Yuon Ling Tschang as Ong
- Philipp Manning as Der Vorsitzende

== Bibliography ==
- Waldman, Harry. Missing Reels: Lost Films of American and European Cinema. McFarland, 2000.
