= The Devil's Chains =

1921 film

- German: Satansketten
- Directed by: Léo Lasko
- Written by: Ernst Bertini; Rudolf Strauß
- Produced by: Albert Pommer
- Starring: Ressel Orla; Margarete Kupfer; Marga von Kierska
- Cinematography: Kurt Lande
- Production company: Dea-Film
- Distributed by: Terra Film
- Release date: 26 October 1921
- Country: Germany
- Languages: Silent; German intertitles

The Devil's Chains (German: Satansketten) is a 1921 German silent film directed by Léo Lasko and starring Ressel Orla, Margarete Kupfer and Marga von Kierska.

The film's sets were designed by the art director Robert Herlth and Walter Röhrig.

== Cast ==
- Ressel Orla
- Margarete Kupfer
- Marga von Kierska
- Alfred Haase
- Erich Kaiser-Titz
