= The Other Woman (1924 film) =

1924 film

- Directed by: Gerhard Lamprecht
- Written by: Fanny Carlsen; Iwan Smith
- Produced by: Albert Pommer
- Starring: Xenia Desni; Fritz Alberti; Hildegard Imhof
- Cinematography: Carl Hoffmann
- Music by: Giuseppe Becce
- Production company: UFA
- Distributed by: UFA
- Release date: 5 September 1924
- Country: Germany
- Languages: Silent; German intertitles

The Other Woman (German: Die Andere) is a 1924 German silent drama film directed by Gerhard Lamprecht and starring Xenia Desni, Fritz Alberti and Hildegard Imhof.

The film's sets were designed by the art director Hans Jacoby. It was shot at the Babelsberg Studios in Berlin and on location in a variety of locations including Nice, Southampton and Tangier.

== Cast ==
- Xenia Desni as Georgette
- Fritz Alberti as Mills
- Elsie Fuller as Blanche
- Hugo Werner-Kahle as Jan Terbrooch
- Didier Aslan as Von Soria
- Hildegard Imhof
- Lina Paulsen
- Franz Schönfeld
- Gustav Adolf Semler

== Bibliography ==
- Grange, William. Cultural Chronicle of the Weimar Republic. Scarecrow Press, 2008.
