= Killing Silence =

1920 film

- Directed by: Artur Holz
- Written by: Lisa Braunhof
- Cinematography: A.O. Weitzenberg
- Production company: Decla-Bioscop
- Distributed by: Decla-Bioscop
- Release date: 1920
- Country: Germany
- Languages: Silent; German intertitles

Killing Silence (German:Tötendes Schweigen) is a 1920 German silent film directed by Artur Holz.

== Cast ==
In alphabetical order

- Julius Brandt
- Friedel Kühne
- Nien Soen Ling
- Karl Römer
- Heinz Stieda
- Carola Toelle
- Erika Unruh

== Bibliography ==
- Shulamith Behr, David Fanning & Douglas Jarman. Expressionism Reassessed. Manchester University Press, 1993.
