= Eternal River =

1920 film directed by Johannes Guter

- Directed by: Johannes Guter
- Written by: Hans Janowitz
- Starring: Werner Krauss; Marija Leiko; Heinrich Peer
- Cinematography: Hans Bloch
- Production company: Centaur-Film
- Distributed by: Centaur-Film
- Release date: 1 May 1920
- Country: Germany
- Languages: Silent; German intertitles

Eternal River (German: Ewiger Strom) is a 1920 German silent drama film directed by Johannes Guter and starring Werner Krauss, Marija Leiko and Heinrich Peer.

The film's sets were designed by the art director Robert Neppach. It premiered at the Marmorhaus in Berlin.

== Cast ==
- Werner Krauss as Ein Fährmann
- Marija Leiko as Marija, ein Mädchen
- Heinrich Peer as Professor Anton Weniaan
- F.W. Schröder-Schrom as Ingenieur Jan Bruun
- Gerhard Tandar as Kapitänin, Gerhard Wenlaan
- Vladimir Agayev as Russischer Student
- Bamboula as Ein schwarzer Millionär

== Bibliography ==
- Giesen, Rolf. The Nosferatu Story: The Seminal Horror Film, Its Predecessors and Its Enduring Legacy. McFarland, 2019.
