= Gloria Fatalis =

1922 film

- Directed by: Johan Gildemeijer
- Written by: Johan Gildemeijer
- Release date: 21 April 1922
- Country: Netherlands
- Language: Silent

Gloria Fatalis is a 1922 Dutch silent film directed by Johan Gildemeijer.

== Cast ==
- Emmy Arbous - Operazangeres
- Gustav Adolf Semler - Schoolmeester
- Mimi Irving - Hun dochter
