= The White Demon =

1932 film

- Directed by: Kurt Gerron
- Written by: Philipp Lothar Mayring; Fritz Zeckendorf
- Produced by: Bruno Duday
- Starring: Hans Albers; Gerda Maurus; Peter Lorre
- Cinematography: Carl Hoffmann
- Edited by: Constantin Mick
- Music by: Hans-Otto Borgmann
- Production company: UFA
- Distributed by: UFA
- Release date: 19 November 1932
- Running time: 107 minutes
- Country: Germany
- Language: German

The White Demon (German: Der weiße Dämon) is a 1932 German drama film directed by Kurt Gerron and starring Hans Albers, Gerda Maurus and Peter Lorre. The film is also known by the alternative title of Dope. The sets were designed by the art director Julius von Borsody.

A separate French-language version Narcotics was also made.

== Synopsis ==
A drug dealer gets a rising young female singer addicted to drugs. Her brother decides to hunt him down in revenge.

== Cast ==
- Hans Albers as Heini Gildemeister
- Gerda Maurus as Gerda Gildemeister
- Peter Lorre as Hunchback
- Lucie Höflich as Gildemeister's Mother
- Trude von Molo as Dora Lind
- Alfred Abel as Gorre
- Hans Joachim Schaufuß as Gorre's Son
- Raoul Aslan as Dr. Urusew
- Hubert von Meyerinck as Marquis d'Esquillon
- Alfred Beierle
- Ernst Behmer
- Paul Biensfeldt
- Julius Brandt
- Hansjoachim Büttner
- Eugen Burg
- Louis Brody as Theater Janitor
- Julius E. Herrmann
- Karl John
- Erwin Kalser
- Philipp Manning
- Klaus Pohl as Theaterdiener
- Ernst Pröckl
- Paul Rehkopf
- Emilie Süssmann
- Eva Speyer
- Emilia Unda
- Else Ward
- Eduard von Winterstein as Arzt

== Bibliography ==
- Kreimeier, Klaus. The Ufa Story: A History of Germany's Greatest Film Company, 1918–1945. University of California Press, 1999.
