= At Ruedesheimer Castle There Is a Lime Tree =

1928 film directed by Johannes Guter

- Vera Schmiterlöw and Werner Fuetterer
- Directed by: Johannes Guter
- Written by: Hans Rameau
- Starring: Werner Fuetterer; Marija Leiko; Alvin Neuss
- Cinematography: Edgar S. Ziesemer
- Production company: Deutsche Fox
- Distributed by: Defa-Deutsche Fox
- Release date: February 1928 (Germany)
- Country: Germany
- Languages: Silent; German intertitles

At Ruedesheimer Castle There Is a Lime Tree (German: Am Ruedesheimer Schloss steht eine Linde) is a 1928 German silent romantic drama film directed by Johannes Guter and starring Werner Fuetterer, Marija Leiko and Alvin Neuss. It was made by the German subsidiary of the American Fox Film company. It takes its title from a popular German song of the same name. It was shot at the Babelsberg Studios in Potsdam and on location around Rüdesheim am Rhein.

== Cast ==
- Werner Fuetterer as Fritz von Hohenstein
- Marija Leiko as Fritzs Mutter
- Alwin Neuss as Schneidemeister Wangen
- Carl Walther Meyer as Hans, der Lehrling
- Paul Henckels as Ensser, Staatsekretär
- Eugen Neufeld as Ottokar Kalkreuth
- Gertrud Kornstedt as Else, Kalkreuths Tochter
- Rudolf Klein-Rhoden
- Vera Schmiterlöw

== Bibliography ==
- Jacobsen, Wolfgang (1994) [1992]. Babelsberg: das Filmstudio (in German). Berlin: Argon. ISBN 978-3-87024-291-6.
