= Fritz Arno Wagner =

German cinematographer

- Born: 5 December 1889; Schmiedefeld am Rennsteig, German Empire
- Died: 18 August 1958 (aged 68); Göttingen, Lower Saxony, West Germany
- Resting place: Waldfriedhof Dahlem cemetery
- Education: Académie des Beaux-Arts; University of Leipzig
- Occupation: Cinematographer
- Movement: German Expressionism

Fritz Arno Wagner (5 December 1889 – 18 August 1958) was a German cinematographer. He is considered one of the most acclaimed cinematographers in Germany from the 1920s to the 1950s. He played a key role in the Expressionist film movement during the Weimar period and is perhaps best known for excelling "in the portrayal of horror," according to noted film critic Lotte H. Eisner.

== Background ==
Born in Schmiedefeld am Rennsteig, Germany, Wagner received his training at the Académie des Beaux-Arts in Paris. In 1910, while still attending the University of Leipzig, he managed to secure a job as a clerk at the Pathé film company. In 1912, he became both secretary and chef at the Pathé offices in Vienna and later in Berlin.

== Career as cinematographer ==
An iconic scene of the shadow of the vampire climbing up a staircase from F.W. Murnau's Nosferatu (1922)

Interested in cinematography, Wagner became a newsreel cameraman in 1913 and was stationed in New York for Pathé Weekly, where he reported on the Mexican Revolution. At the outbreak of World War I in 1914, he returned to Germany to enlist in his country's elite Hussar cavalry whilst still filming war reports. However, after being wounded, he decided to take the job of stills photographer and then 2nd cameraman at Projektions-AG Union PAGU. In 1919, he went to work as a primary cameraman for Decla-Bioscop.

Along with Karl Freund, Wagner became Germany's leading cinematographer of the 1920s and 1930s, a master of the dark, moody lighting that characterized the expressionist movement. He worked with some of Germany most prominent directors, including Ernst Lubitsch on Madame Dubarry (1919), F.W. Murnau on The Haunted Castle (1921), The Burning Soil (1922) and his classic Nosferatu (1922), and G.W. Pabst on four features, The Love of Jeanne Ney (1927), Westfront 1918 (1930), Comradeship (1931) and The Threepenny Opera (1931) based on the Bertolt Brecht and Kurt Weill musical. He also collaborated with Fritz Lang on four films, Destiny (1921), Spies (1928), M (1931) and The Testament of Dr. Mabuse (1932).

After the Nazis took over in 1933, causing many of the country's leading film directors to flee Germany for the U.S. (including his collaborator Lang) Wagner's career began to decline. To make ends meet he abandoned his unique style and turned to making glossy costume epics and musicals for The Ministry of Propaganda at Universum Film AG [Ufa] where he had once worked under Erich Pommer. After WWII, he worked for a couple of years as a director of photography of documentaries and newsreels before returning to feature films for the DEFA production company at Studio Babelsberg.

== Death ==
On 18 August 1958, Wagner died in Göttingen in an automobile accident (as his colleague Murnau had 27 years earlier) whilst shooting the comedy Ohne Mutter geht es nicht (It Doesn't Work Without a Mother) for director Erik Ode. He is buried at the Waldfriedhof Dahlem am Hüttenweg cemetery in Berlin.

== Portrayals ==
In Shadow of the Vampire, a fictional film about the making of Nosferatu, Wagner is portrayed by Cary Elwes, who also played Lord Arthur Holmwood in the 1992 adaptation of Bram Stoker's Dracula.

== Partial filmography ==
- As a cinematographer
- The Galley Slave (1919)
- The Closed Chain (1920)
- Intrigue (1920)
- Parisian Women (1921)
- Playing with Fire (1921)
- Destiny (1921)
- The Haunted Castle (1921)
- Nosferatu (1922)
- Barmaid (1922)
- Lust for Life (1922)
- The Call of Destiny (1922)
- The Earl of Essex (1922)
- The Anthem of Love (1922)
- The Burning Soil (1922)
- Warning Shadows (1922)
- Between Evening and Morning (1923)
- The Great Industrialist (1923)
- The Hungarian Princess (1923)
- Leap into Life (1924)
- Chronicles of the Gray House (1925)
- Peter the Pirate (1925)
- The Telephone Operator (1925)
- Three Cuckoo Clocks (1926)
- The Pink Diamond (1926)
- A Modern Dubarry (1927)
- At the Edge of the World (1927)
- The Love of Jeanne Ney (1927)
- Spies (1928)
- Spy of Madame Pompadour (1928)
- The Last Fort (1928)
- Waterloo (1929)
- Diary of a Lost Girl (1929)
- Napoleon at Saint Helena (1929)
- Chasing Fortune (1930)
- Scandalous Eva (1930)
- Fire in the Opera House (1930)
- Dolly Gets Ahead (1930)
- Westfront 1918 (1930)
- Comradeship (1931)
- Ronny (1931)
- M (1931)
- The Threepenny Opera (1931)
- Tannenberg (1932)
- Tell Me Tonight (1932)
- The Song of Night (1932)
- Things Are Getting Better Already (1932)
- The Beautiful Adventure (1932)
- The Testament of Dr. Mabuse (1933)
- The Castle in the South (1933)
- Dream Castle (1933)
- Refugees (1933)
- Spies at Work (1933)
- At the End of the World (1934)
- Love, Death and the Devil (1934)
- Playing with Fire (1934)
- Volga in Flames (1934)
- The Devil in the Bottle (1935)
- Black Roses (1935)
- Savoy Hotel 217 (1936)
- Under Blazing Heavens (1936)
- The Man Who Was Sherlock Holmes (1937)
- Tango Notturno (1937)
- The Broken Jug (1937)
- Adrienne Lecouvreur (1938)
- The Girl with a Good Reputation (1938)
- Robert Koch (1939)
- A Hopeless Case (1939)
- The Fourth Is Not Coming (1939)
- Enemies (1940)
- An Old Heart Becomes Young Again (1943)
- Laugh, Pagliacci (1943)
- Laugh Bajazzo (1943)
- The Court Concert (1948)
- Girls Behind Bars (1949)
- Doctor Praetorius (1950)
- The Girl from the South Seas (1950)
- Torreani (1951)
- A Very Big Child (1952)
- The Prince of Pappenheim (1952)
- The Cousin from Nowhere (1953)
- The Rose of Stamboul (1953)
- The Country Schoolmaster (1954)
- Clivia (1954)
- The Faithful Hussar (1954)
- The Great Lola (1954)
- Consul Strotthoff (1954)
- The Ambassador's Wife (1955)
- A Thousand Melodies (1956)
- My Sixteen Sons (1956)
- The Girl Without Pyjamas (1957)
- The Csardas King (1958)
