= Shadows of the Underworld =

1931 film directed by Harry Piel

- Directed by: Harry Piel
- Written by: Henrik Galeen
- Starring: Harry Piel; Dary Holm; Elisabeth Pinajeff
- Cinematography: Ewald Daub
- Edited by: Andrew Marton
- Music by: Fritz Wenneis
- Production company: Ariel-Film
- Distributed by: Terra Film
- Release date: 27 April 1931
- Running time: 95 minutes
- Country: Germany
- Language: German

Shadows of the Underworld (German: Schatten der Unterwelt) is a 1931 German action film directed by and starring Harry Piel. It also features Dary Holm, Elisabeth Pinajeff and Hans Junkermann. It was made at the Terra Studios in Berlin while location shooting took place in St. Moritz in Switzerland.

The film's sets were designed by the art director Robert A. Dietrich and Emil Hasler. A separate French-language version was also released.

== Synopsis ==
After his invention is stolen and his business partner kidnapped, Harry West pursues the perpetrators while trying to avoid the police on his own trail.

== Cast ==
- Harry Piel as Harry West
- Dary Holm as Irene von Sheridan
- Elisabeth Pinajeff as Yvette Finetti
- Hans Junkermann as Amadeus Keller
- Hans Behal as S Berry
- Carl Balhaus as Jonny
- Aruth Wartan as Apolloni
- Leopold von Ledebur as Kommissär Braun
- Carl Goetz as Jonnys Vater
- Eugen Rex as Kommissar Stückli
- Charly Berger
- Olga Engl
- Maria Forescu
- Wolfgang von Schwindt

== Bibliography ==
- Hans-Michael Bock and Tim Bergfelder. The Concise Cinegraph: An Encyclopedia of German Cinema. Berghahn Books.
