= The Yellow Death =

1920 film directed by Carl Wilhelm

- Directed by: Carl Wilhelm
- Written by: Hans Gaus
- Produced by: Fritz Deitz
- Starring: Eduard von Winterstein; Guido Herzfeld; Frida Richard
- Cinematography: Axel Graatkjær
- Production companies: Olympia-Film; Internationaler Filmvertrieb Dietz
- Release date: February 1920
- Country: Germany
- Languages: Silent; German intertitles

The Yellow Death (German: Der gelbe Tod) is a 1920 German silent thriller film directed by Carl Wilhelm and starring Eduard von Winterstein, Guido Herzfeld and Frida Richard. It was released in two parts, premiering at the Marmorhaus in Berlin.

The film's sets were designed by the art director Fritz Kraenke.

== Cast ==
- Eduard von Winterstein as Polizeimeister Karpuschkin
- Esther Hagan as Tochter Anna
- Guido Herzfeld as Juwelier Salomon Ascher
- Rosa Valetti as Awdotja, genannt "Großmütterchen", Besitzerin des Varietés "Elysium"
- Fred Juncker as Leutnant Barsoleff
- Rudolf Klein-Rhoden as Dr. Zborowitsch, Redakteur
- Aenderly Lebius as Graf Majewsky
- Frida Richard as Rebekka
- Gustav Adolf Semler as Alexander, his son, prosecutor
- Lilly Sueß-Eisenlohr as Rahel
- Maria Wefers as Sonja
- Wilhelm Prager as Smudra, Sanitätsrat
- Fritz Falkner as Bursche Iwan

== Bibliography ==
- Bock, Hans-Michael & Bergfelder, Tim. The Concise CineGraph. Encyclopedia of German Cinema. Berghahn Books, 2009.
