= The House of Torment =

1921 film directed by Carl Wilhelm

- Directed by: Carl Wilhelm
- Written by: Hans Gaus; Carl Wilhelm
- Produced by: Carl Wilhelm
- Starring: Ressel Orla; Fritz Kortner; Rudolf Klein-Rhoden
- Cinematography: Arpad Viragh
- Production company: Carl Wilhelm-Film
- Distributed by: Terra Film
- Release date: 3 February 1921
- Country: Germany
- Languages: Silent; German intertitles

The House of Torment (German: Das Haus der Qualen) is a 1920 German silent drama film directed by Carl Wilhelm and starring Ressel Orla, Fritz Kortner and Rudolf Klein-Rhoden.

The film's sets were designed by the art director Carl Ludwig Kirmse.

== Cast ==
- Ressel Orla as Maud
- Fritz Kortner as Arzt
- Rudolf Klein-Rhoden as Griffith
- Charles Willy Kayser
- Nien Soen Ling
- Nien Tso Ling
- Mabel May-Yong
- Harald Paulsen

== Bibliography ==
- Grange, William. Cultural Chronicle of the Weimar Republic. Scarecrow Press, 2008.
