= Tingel-Tangel (1930 film) =

1930 film

- Directed by: Jaap Speyer
- Written by: Alexander Alexander
- Produced by: Erich Engels
- Starring: Elisabeth Pinajeff; Ernő Verebes; Fritz Kampers
- Cinematography: Bruno Mondi
- Edited by: Paul May
- Music by: Austin Egen; Franz Grothe
- Production company: Erich Engels-Film
- Distributed by: Erich Engels-Film
- Release date: 29 December 1930
- Running time: 88 minutes
- Country: Germany
- Language: German

Tingel-Tangel is a 1930 German comedy film directed by Jaap Speyer and starring Elisabeth Pinajeff, Ernő Verebes, and Fritz Kampers.

The film's sets were designed by the art director Willi Herrmann and Herbert O. Phillips.

== Cast ==
- Elisabeth Pinajeff as Sonja
- Ernő Verebes as Billie
- Fritz Kampers as Job
- Katta Sterna as Marianne, seine Schwester
- Bruno Kastner as Fox Blues
- Hilde Auen as Ilonka, seine Freundin
- Julius Falkenstein as Director Breslauer
- Alfred Braun
- Austin Egen
- Camilla von Hollay
- Gerhard Dammann

== Bibliography ==
- Uhlenbrok, Katja (1998). MusikSpektakelFilm: Musiktheater und Tanzkultur im deutschen Film 1922–1937. Munich: Text + Kritik. ISBN 978-3-88377-598-2.
