= Kean (1921 film) =

1921 film

- Directed by: Rudolf Biebrach
- Written by: Alexandre Dumas (play); Thomas Hall
- Produced by: Paul Ebner; Maxim Galitzenstein
- Starring: Heinrich George; Carola Toelle
- Cinematography: Otto Tober
- Production company: Maxim-Film
- Distributed by: UFA
- Release date: 16 December 1921
- Country: Germany
- Languages: Silent; German intertitles

Kean is a 1921 German silent historical film directed by Rudolf Biebrach and starring Heinrich George and Carola Toelle. It is an adaptation of the 1836 play Kean by Alexandre Dumas.

The film's sets were designed by the art director Ludwig Kainer and Hans Sohnle.

== Cast ==
- Heinrich George as Edmund Kean
- Carola Toelle as Anna Danby
- Alfons Fryland as Prinz von Wales
- Olga Limburg as Gräfin Coefeld
- Fritz Junkermann as Graf Coefeld
- Felix Norfolk as Lord Melville
- Wilhelm Diegelmann as Konstabler
- Margarete Schlegel as Retty
- Rudolf Biebrach as Old Bob
- Ernst Behmer as Darius, der Friseur
- Guido Herzfeld as Salomon, der Souffleur
- Albert Kunze as Wirt
- Bruno Hönscherl as John
- Kurt Vespermann

== Bibliography ==
- Klossner, Michael (2002). The Europe of 1500–1815 on Film and Television: A Worldwide Filmography of Over 2550 Works, 1895 Through 2000. Jefferson, NC: McFarland. ISBN 978-0-7864-1223-5.
