= The Red Masquerade Ball =

1921 film

- Directed by: Hanns Kobe
- Written by: Hans Janowitz; Franz Schulz
- Starring: Rudolf Forster; Marija Leiko; Ressel Orla
- Cinematography: Hans Bloch
- Production company: Centaur-Film
- Release date: 4 February 1921
- Country: Germany
- Languages: Silent; German intertitles

The Red Masquerade Ball (German: Die rote Redoute) is a 1921 German silent film directed by Hanns Kobe and starring Rudolf Forster, Marija Leiko and Ressel Orla.

== Cast ==
- Rudolf Forster
- Marija Leiko
- Ressel Orla
- Paul Rehkopf
- Hermann Vallentin

== Bibliography ==
- Rolf Giesen. The Nosferatu Story: The Seminal Horror Film, Its Predecessors and Its Enduring Legacy. McFarland, 2019.
