= Grand Hotel (1927 film) =

1927 film directed by Johannes Guter

- Directed by: Johannes Guter
- Written by: Béla Balázs
- Produced by: Jakob Karol
- Starring: Mady Christians; Dagny Servaes; Günther Hadank
- Cinematography: Günther Krampf
- Music by: Gustav Gold
- Production company: Jakob Karol Film
- Distributed by: UFA
- Release date: 5 September 1927
- Running time: 80 minutes
- Country: Germany
- Languages: Silent; German intertitles

Grand Hotel (German: Grand Hotel...!) is a 1927 German silent drama film directed by Johannes Guter and starring Mady Christians, Dagny Servaes and Günther Hadank. It was shot at the Babelsberg Studios in Berlin. The film's sets were designed by the art director Erich Czerwonski.

== Cast ==
- Mady Christians
- Dagny Servaes
- Günther Hadank
- Werner Fuetterer
- Erna Morena
- Frida Richard
- John Mylong
- Otto Wallburg
- Karl Platen
- Paul Otto
- Harry Hardt
- Heinrich Gotho

== Bibliography ==
- Bock, Hans-Michael & Bergfelder, Tim. The Concise CineGraph. Encyclopedia of German Cinema. Berghahn Books, 2009.
