= Inge Larsen =

1923 film

- Directed by: Hans Steinhoff
- Written by: Karl Vollmöller; Hans Steinhoff
- Produced by: Hanns Lippmann; Henny Porten
- Starring: Henny Porten; Paul Otto; Ressel Orla; Hans Albers
- Cinematography: Helmar Lerski
- Music by: Alexander Schirmann
- Production company: Henny Porten Filmproduktion
- Distributed by: UFA
- Release date: 16 October 1923
- Running time: 85 minutes
- Country: Germany
- Languages: Silent; German intertitles

Inge Larsen is a 1923 German silent drama film directed by Hans Steinhoff and starring Henny Porten, Paul Otto and Ressel Orla. It was shot on location in Copenhagen. The film's sets were designed by art directors Alfred Junge, Ludwig Kainer and Fritz Lück.

== Cast ==
- Henny Porten as Inge Larsen
- Paul Otto as Baron Kerr
- Ressel Orla as Evelyne
- Vasilij Vronski as Kerrs Diener
- Paul Hansen as Jan Olsen
- Hans Albers as gelangweilter Attaché
- Ludwig Rex
- Leopold von Ledebur

== Bibliography ==
- Bock, Hans-Michael & Bergfelder, Tim. The Concise CineGraph. Encyclopedia of German Cinema. Berghahn Books, 2009.
