= Parisian Women =

1921 film

- Directed by: Léo Lasko
- Written by: Leo Heller; Léo Lasko
- Produced by: Albert Pommer
- Starring: Ressel Orla; Xenia Desni; Ralph Arthur Roberts
- Cinematography: Fritz Arno Wagner
- Production company: Dea-Film
- Distributed by: Prero-Film
- Release date: 21 December 1921
- Country: Germany
- Languages: Silent; German intertitles

Parisian Women (German: Pariserinnen) is a 1921 German silent film directed by Léo Lasko and starring Ressel Orla, Xenia Desni and Ralph Arthur Roberts. The film's sets were designed by the art director Robert Herlth and Walter Röhrig. It premiered at the Marmorhaus in Berlin.

== Cast ==
- Ressel Orla as Lolotte (Lou)
- Xenia Desni as Philine
- Ralph Arthur Roberts as Dieider
- Paul Bildt
- Emil Albes as Marcellier
- Lydia Potechina as Marcelliers Frau
- Ivan Bulatov
- Lia Eibenschütz
- John Gottowt as Aristide
- Wilhelm Diegelmann
- Heinrich Peer
- Ernst Hofmann as Georges
- Fritz Junkermann as Baptiste
- Eugen Klöpfer as Gaston
- Paul Otto as Baron de Rieux
- Else Berna as Margot
- Loni Nest as Rose
- Karl Falkenberg as Sohn des Barons

== Bibliography ==
- Alfred Krautz. International directory of cinematographers, set- and costume designers in film, Volume 4. Saur, 1984.
