= Ernst Pröckl =

- Born: 21 June 1888; Vienna, Austro-Hungarian Empire
- Died: 26 November 1957 (aged 69); Vienna, Austria
- Occupations: Actor, theatre director
- Years active: 1918-1956 (film)

Ernst Johann Pröckl (21 June 1888 – 26 November 1957) was an Austrian stage actor and director. He also appeared in numerous films, mainly German.

== Selected filmography ==
- The Peruvian (1919)
- Judith Trachtenberg (1920)
- Christian Wahnschaffe (1920)
- The Last Hour (1921)
- The Story of a Maid (1921)
- Bigamy (1922)
- Youth (1922)
- Vineta, the Sunken City (1923)
- Princess Suwarin (1923)
- The Treasure of Gesine Jacobsen (1923)
- The Beautiful Girl (1923)
- Leap Into Life (1924)
- I Love You (1925)
- The Proud Silence (1925)
- People of the Sea (1925)
- The Sweet Girl (1926)
- I Stand in the Dark Midnight (1927)
- The Schorrsiegel Affair (1928)
- Fair Game (1928)
- The Model from Montparnasse (1929)
- Marriage in Name Only (1930)
- The Stolen Face (1930)
- Moritz Makes His Fortune (1931)
- The Battle of Bademunde (1931)
- That's All That Matters (1931)
- The Scoundrel (1931)
- The White Demon (1932)
- Modern Dowry (1932)
- Death Over Shanghai (1932)
- Tannenberg (1932)
- Madame Makes Her Exit (1932)
- Once There Was a Waltz (1932)
- Two Lucky Days (1932)
- The Emperor's Waltz (1933)
- Grand Duchess Alexandra (1933)
- A Door Opens (1933)
- Romance (1936)
- Shadows of the Past (1936)
- Hannerl and Her Lovers (1936)
- Darling of the Sailors (1937)
- Frau Sixta (1938)
- Hotel Sacher (1939)
- The Heart Must Be Silent (1944)
- Lavender (1953)
- Forest Liesel (1956)

== Bibliography ==
- Hardt, Ursula. From Caligari to California: Erich Pommer's life in the International Film Wars. Berghahn Books, 1996.
