= Destiny (1921 film) =

1921 film by Fritz Lang

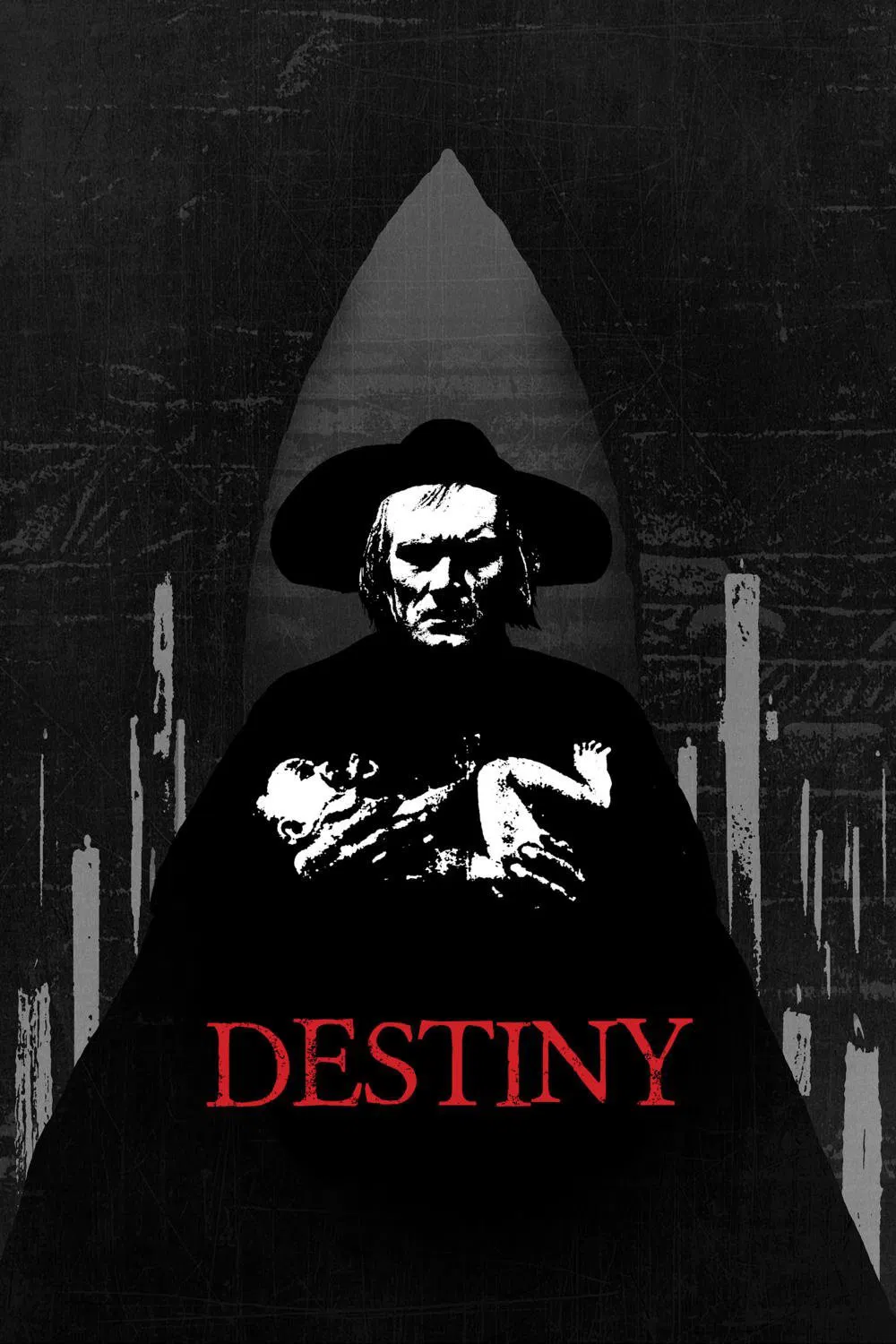
- Film poster
- Directed by: Fritz Lang
- Screenplay by: Fritz Lang; Thea von Harbou (Note: von Harbou is uncredited in most surviving prints, though her contributions are well-attested.)
- Produced by: Erich Pommer
- Starring: Lil Dagover; Walter Janssen; Bernhard Goetzke
- Cinematography: Erich Nitzschmann; Hermann Saalfrank; Fritz Arno Wagner
- Edited by: Fritz Lang (Note: Though there is no officially credited editor, it was common for directors working in the silent era to oversee the editing process themselves.)
- Music by: Giuseppe Becce (Note: Becce composed the musical accompaniment for the 1921 premier at the Mozartsaal in Berlin.)
- Production company: Decla-Bioscop AG
- Distributed by: Decla-Bioscop AG
- Release date: 6 October 1921 (Berlin)
- Running time: 97 minutes
- Country: Germany
- Languages: Silent film; German intertitles

Destiny (Note: The film is also known as Between Two Worlds and was originally released in the United States as Behind the Wall.) (German: Der müde Tod: ein deutsches Volkslied in sechs Versen, lit. 'The Weary Death: A German Folksong in Six Verses') is a 1921 silent German Expressionist fantasy romance film directed by Fritz Lang and inspired by the Indian folktale of Savitri. The plot follows a woman desperate to reunite with her dead lover. It is also an anthology film that follows three other tragic romances set in the Middle East, in Venice, and in China.

== Plot ==
Destiny (1921)

In "Some Time and Some Place," a loving young couple is riding in a carriage on a country road, when they pick up a hitchhiker, offering him a ride into town. Little do they know, this stranger is Death himself.

In town, Death visits the mayor's office, where he purchases a small piece of land adjacent to the town cemetery. Surrounding this property, Death erects a giant, mysterious wall. At the local tavern, the young couple encounters Death again, and when the young woman is distracted, her lover disappears. Grief stricken, she sobs in front of the mysterious wall, when she sees a large group of ghosts walk past her, and through the wall. The last among these ghosts is her lover; and despite her protests, he also moves through the wall, entering the realm of Death.

Relentless, the young woman confronts Death, begging him to bring her to her lover. He leads her to a large, dark room, with numerous long candles, each one in different stages of burning. The young woman demands to know why Death took her lover away, to which Death explains that he was simply following God's will, and that it was her lover's time to die. She asks if there is anything that can be done to get her love back, arguing that love is stronger than Death. Death tells her that each candle in the room represents a human life, and that currently, three candles are flickering, representing three lives hanging in the balance. Death promises the young woman that, if she can save one of these lives with love, he will return her lover to the living.

=== The Story of the First Light ===
During the holy month of Ramadan in "The City of the Faithful," a muezzin calls those of the Islamic faith to prayer. Zobeide, a princess and the Caliph's sister, meets with her secret lover, the Frank, in the mosque. The Frank, however, is exposed as an infidel, and is chased to the roof, where he escapes by diving into a nearby body of water.

The Caliph visits Zobeide, attempting to find where her loyalties lie. Although she denies an affair with the Frank, the Caliph is unconvinced and tells her his guards are scouring the city for him. After he leaves, Zobeide orders her servant, Ayesha, to find the Frank and tell him to infiltrate the royal palace by nightfall. One of the Caliph's guards follows Ayesha to the Frank and reports back to his master. At nightfall, the Frank scales the palace wall and is reunited with Zobeide; this reunion is cut short by Ayesha warning them that the Caliph is aware of the Frank being in the palace and has sent his guards. After a short chase through the palace grounds, the guards capture the Frank, and the Caliph sentences him to death.

The Caliph orders his gardener, El Mott, to bury the Frank alive. When Zobeide sees what has become of her lover, Death appears to claim him. The first of three candles burns out.

=== The Story of the Second Light ===
During the Carnival festival in Venice, Monna Fiametta, a noblewoman, is visited by her lover, Gianfrancesco, a merchant of the middle class. He is forced away by the appearance of Monna's fiancé, Girolamo, a member of the Council of Fourteen. Jealous of Monna's affections for Gianfrancesco, and aware of her hatred towards him, Girolamo reveals to her his plot to have her lover executed by order of the Council.

Desperate and angry, Monna plots to kill her fiancé, sending two letters by messenger. The first letter, addressed to Girolamo, asks him for a private meeting. When Girolamo reads this note, he suspects the messenger has an additional letter. He has his men kill the messenger and reads the second letter, addressed to Gianfrancesco, alerting him of Girolamo's plot and telling him to flee, as well as her plan to kill Girolamo. Furious, Girolamo sends his own note, as well as his lavish Carnival costume, to Gianfrancesco, under the guise that it is from Monna. Entering her home in costume, Gianfrancesco is attacked by Monna, who is unaware of his identity. He is also stabbed from behind by the Moor, Monna's servant.

Gianfrancesco reveals his identity to Monna and dies. As Monna grieves over her dead lover, Death appears to claim his soul. The second of three candles burns out.

=== The Story of the Third Light ===
On a farm in the Chinese Empire, master magician A Hi receives a letter from the Emperor, requesting him to perform magic tricks at his birthday party. He warns, however, that should A Hi bore him, he will be beheaded.

Using his jade wand, A Hi flies a carpet to the Emperor's palace, with his two assistants, Tiao Tsien and Liang, in tow. Performing for the Emperor, A Hi creates a miniature army. The Emperor is impressed, but wants his female assistant, Tiao Tsien, as his gift. A Hi offers him a magic horse instead. Again, the Emperor is impressed, but orders A Hi to hand over his assistant. Liang, Tiao Tsien's lover, attempts to escape with her, but is captured, while she is taken to the Emperor's private quarters. When the Emperor tries to sleep with her, she quickly rejects him.

Obsessed with having Tiao Tsien's affections, the Emperor turns to A Hi, and orders him to make her submit. When A Hi confronts his assistant, she takes his wand, accidentally cracking it. Using the wand, she turns A Hi into a cactus, and several guards into pigs. She notices that the more she uses the wand, the more it degrades. Spawning an elephant, Tiao Tsien breaks Liang out of his cell, and they escape the palace together. The Emperor calls upon his archer to kill them.

When the Emperor's archer confronts the assistants, he kills Liang, but spares Tiao Tsien. Death appears to claim Liang's soul, and the last of the three candles burns out.

=== Ending ===
Although Death has won their bet, he takes pity on the female lover, and offers her one last chance to reunite with her beloved. Death tells her that if she can find another soul to replace her lover in death, he will return to the living. He warns that she will only have an hour to do this.

Asking many of the older villagers to trade their lives, she is quickly rejected. When a fire starts in a large building, many people rush to escape, leaving behind a baby. The female lover runs into the burning building and holds the baby. Death appears, and is ready to accept the child in place of her lover. However, she looks through the window to see the grieving mother cry for her child. Unwilling to let another experience such a loss, she hands the baby over to the mother. She then turns to Death, and offers her soul to him, content to join her lover in death. Death takes her through his wall, and rejoices, as she reunites with her lover.

== Cast ==
- Lil Dagover as the female half of the Loving Couple, as well as Zobeide, Monna Fiametta, and Tiao Tsien
- Walter Janssen as the male half of the Loving Couple, as well as the Frank, Gianfrancesco, and Liang
- Bernhard Goetzke as Death, El Mott, and the Emperor's archer
- Hans Sternberg as the mayor
- Carl Rückert as the Reverend
- Max Adelbert as the notary and the chancellor
- Wilhelm Diegelman as the doctor
- Erich Pabst as the teacher
- Karl Platen as the apothecary
- Hermann Pischa as the tailor
- Paul Rehkopf as the gravedigger
- Max Pfeiffer as the night watchman
- Georg John as the beggar
- Lydia Potechina as the landlady
- Grete Berger as the mother
- Eduard von Winterstein as the Caliph
- Erika Unruh as Ayesha
- Rudolph Klein-Rogge as Dervish and Girolamo
- Lewis Brody as the Moor
- Lothar Mütel as the messenger
- Edgar Pauly as friend
- Lina Paulsen as the nurse
- Charles Puffy as the Emperor of China
- Paul Biensteldt as A Hi
- Paul Newmann as the executioner

== Inspiration ==
The film was largely inspired by the Indian mythological tale of Sati Savitri as well as the director's own personal experience. According to Lang's biographer, Patrick McGilligan, the film "came on the heels of his mother's death, [and] would be the director 's most thoughtful and compassionate meditation on mortality." He goes on to explain that Lang reportedly came up with his vision of Death while suffering from a fever in bed as a child:

"He recalled envisioning the approach of 'the dark stranger' in a wide-brimmed hat, illumined by the moonlight streaming in through a half-open window. 'I slept and dreamed—or was I awake?' He glimpsed 'the tear-stained face of my adored mother,' as she slipped from view. He raised himself up weakly, to be led away by Death. Helping hands grabbed him, pushed him down, saved him. The horror of the dream-experience combined with 'a kind of mystical ecstasy which gave me, boy though I still was, the complete understanding of the ecstasy which made martyrs and saints embrace Death.' Lang recovered, 'but the love of Death, compounded of horror and affection,' he said, 'stayed with me and became a part of my films.'"

== Release ==
=== Theatrical release ===
For a time, the intertitles for the film were thought to be lost; Munich Stadtmuseum director Enno Patalas recovered most of them from the Cinématèque Française thanks to Lotte Eisner.

=== Home media ===
In 2016, Kino released a restored version of the film on Blu-ray. This release included Lang's original color tintings, thanks to the Murnau Foundation.

== Reception ==
=== Initial response ===
Destiny was poorly received on its release, with critics complaining that it was not 'German' enough. However, the film was well-received in France, which in turn brought it more acclaim in Germany.

=== Later response ===
On Rotten Tomatoes, the film holds an approval rating of 90% based on 21 reviews, with a weighted average rating of 8.1/10. Author and film critic Leonard Maltin awarded the film three and a half out of a possible four stars, praising the film's art direction, photography, and special effects. In a list of the 100 most important German films, compiled in 1994 by the Association of German Cinémathèques, Destiny was placed at #21.

== Analysis ==
John S. Titford of Cinema Journal includes the character Death as an example of Lang's thematic interest with humans acting as machines. He argues that characters like Death "take on the quality of symbols, become archetypes of sub-human forces who embody the concept of Destiny, or the threat to the German nation in the years immediately after the first World War."

The ghost-like appearance of Death is a recurring feature in Lang's films, reportedly stemming from dreams he had as a child. Similar figures appear in Metropolis (1927) and While the City Sleeps (1956).

== Legacy ==
Luis Buñuel, director of Un Chien Andalou, was highly inspired by this film. He states:

"When I saw Destiny, I suddenly knew that I wanted to make movies. It wasn’t the three stories themselves that moved me so much, but the main episode – the arrival of the man in the black hat (whom I instantly recognised as Death) in the Flemish village – and the scene in the cemetery. Something about this film spoke to something deep in me; it clarified my life and my vision of the world."

In Buñuel's Un Chien Andalou, two lovers are buried in the sand, in reference to the Frank's death in the film.

Alfred Hitchcock once stated he was impressed with the film.

Hollywood actor Douglas Fairbanks was reportedly so impressed with the film's special effects, the flying carpet scene in particular, he quickly secured the rights to the film, so they could be replicated for Raoul Walsh's 1924 film, The Thief of Baghdad.

According to Robert Cashill of Cineaste, Bernhard Goetzke's performance as Death had an influence on Ingmar Bergman's The Seventh Seal (1957).

The film's production design by Walter Röhrig, Hermann Warm, and Robert Herlth is also highly praised and is considered an exemplar of German Expressionism. Röhrig and Warm also worked on the prior year's The Cabinet of Dr. Caligari.
