= The Haunting of Castle Kitay =

1920 film

- Directed by: Paul Legband
- Written by: Robert Heymann
- Starring: Georg H. Schnell, Gustav Adolf Semler; Kurt Gerron
- Cinematography: Albert Jaszcz
- Production company: Luna-Film
- Release date: 1 September 1920
- Country: Germany
- Languages: Silent; German intertitles

The Haunting of Castle Kitay (German: Spuk auf Schloß Kitay) is a 1920 German silent drama film directed by Paul Legband and featuring Georg H. Schnell, Gustav Adolf Semler and Kurt Gerron. It marked the start of Gerron's career in feature films and he went on to be a popular screen comedian.

== Cast ==
- Edward Eyseneck as Polizeileutnant Watson
- Kurt Gerron as Diener Flipp
- Johanna Mund as Lady Kitay
- Josef Peterhans as Fürst
- Lilly Rodewald as Lady Falcestone
- Georg H. Schnell as Lord Kitay
- Gustav Adolf Semler as Lord Falcestone

== Bibliography ==
- Giesen, Rolf. The Nosferatu Story: The Seminal Horror Film, Its Predecessors and Its Enduring Legacy. McFarland, 2019.
- Kosta, Barbara. Willing Seduction: The Blue Angel, Marlene Dietrich, and Mass Culture. Berghahn Books, 2009.
