= Hazard (1921 film) =

1921 film

- Directed by: Frederik Larsen
- Written by: Werner Brake
- Produced by: Erich Pommer
- Starring: Carola Toelle; Anton Edthofer; Ressel Orla
- Cinematography: Willy Goldberger
- Production company: Decla-Bioscop
- Distributed by: Decla-Bioscop
- Release date: 8 April 1921
- Country: Germany
- Languages: Silent; German intertitles

Hazard is a 1921 German silent drama film directed by Frederik Larsen and starring Carola Toelle, Anton Edthofer and Ressel Orla.

The film's sets were designed by the art director Fritz Lederer.

== Cast ==
- Carola Toelle as Die Sekretärin
- Anton Edthofer as Ihr Bruder, der Gentleman Dieb
- Ressel Orla as De grand Mondaine
- Ernst Stahl-Nachbaur as Der strenge Gatte
- Fritz Schulz as Hehler
- Charles Puffy as Hehler
- Josef Commer
- Hans Junkermann
- Karl Platen

== Bibliography ==
- Wolfgang Jacobsen, Jörg Schöning & Rudolf Arnheim. Erich Pommer: ein Produzent macht Filmgeschichte. Argon, 1989.
