= Miss Liselott =

1934 film directed by Johannes Guter

- Directed by: Johannes Guter
- Written by: Jean de Letraz (play); Walter Forster; Bobby E. Lüthge
- Produced by: Vahayn Badal
- Starring: Magda Schneider; Albert Lieven; Maria Sazarina
- Cinematography: Willy Winterstein
- Edited by: Waldemar Gaede
- Music by: Franz Doelle
- Production company: Badal-Film
- Distributed by: Metropol-Filmverleih
- Release date: 28 September 1934
- Country: Germany
- Language: German

Miss Liselott (German: Fräulein Liselott) is a 1934 German comedy film directed by Johannes Guter and starring Magda Schneider, Albert Lieven, and Maria Sazarina. The former silent director Franz Hofer worked as assistant director on the film.

The film's sets were designed by the art director Erich Czerwonski.

== Cast ==
- Magda Schneider as Liselotte Fischer
- Albert Lieven as Peter Wendt, Architekt
- Maria Sazarina as Marion Flemming
- Günther Lüders as Ernst Hagen, Komponist
- Willi Schur as Melchior Kraut, Maler
- Kurt Mühlhardt as Eugen Till, Bildhauer
- Oskar Sima as Jasmin, Hausverwalter
- Ilse von Collani as Frieda, Liselottes Freundin
- Philipp Manning as Osterloh, Marions Vormund
- Paul Westermeier as Knoblauch, Gerichtsvollzieher
- Ernst Behmer as Böhmer, Chef des Berufsberatungsbüros
- Rainer Eggemann as Ein Freund Krauts
- C.W. Meyer as Ein Freund Tills
- Hermann Noack as Ein Zoologe
- Gerhard Dammann as Ein Kolonialwarenhändler
- Karl Platen as Diener bei Osterloh

== Bibliography ==
- Bock, Hans-Michael; Bergfelder, Tim, eds. (2009). The Concise Cinegraph: Encyclopaedia of German Cinema. New York: Berghahn Books. ISBN 978-1-57181-655-9.
