= Fair Game (1928 film) =

1928 film

- French poster
- Directed by: Holger-Madsen
- Written by: Arthur Schnitzler (play); Herbert Juttke; Georg C. Klaren
- Produced by: Liddy Hegewald
- Starring: Evelyn Holt; Fred Louis Lerch; Bruno Kastner
- Cinematography: Axel Graatkjær
- Music by: Felix Bartsch
- Production company: Hegewald Film
- Distributed by: Hegewald Film
- Release date: 21 February 1928
- Country: Germany
- Languages: Silent; German intertitles

Fair Game (German: Freiwild) is a 1928 German silent drama film directed by Holger-Madsen and starring Evelyn Holt, Fred Louis Lerch and Bruno Kastner. The film was adapted from the Arthur Schnitzler play.

The film's art direction was by Max Knaake.

== Cast ==
- Evelyn Holt as Anna Riedel
- Fred Louis Lerch as Paul Rönning
- Bruno Kastner as Oberleutnant von Karinski
- John Loder as Oberleutnant von Rohnstedt
- Max Hansen as Enderle
- Ernst Pröckl as Balduin
- Magnus Stifter as Der Oberst
- Hugo Werner-Kahle as Schneider
- Jesta Berg as Zimmervermieterin
- Gerd Briese as Leutnant Vogel
- Günther Hadank as Dr. Wellner
- Hilde Maroff as Pepi
- Boris Nevolin as Kassierer Kohn
- Friedrich Carl Perponcher as Poldi Grehlinger
- Franz Stein as Regisseur Finke
- Geza L. Weiss as Ein Theaterenthusiast

== Bibliography ==
- Hans-Michael Bock and Tim Bergfelder. The Concise Cinegraph: An Encyclopedia of German Cinema. Berghahn Books.
