= Ernst Stahl-Nachbaur =

German actor (1886–1960)

- Born: Ernst Julius Emil Guggenheimer; 6 March 1886; Munich, German Empire
- Died: 13 May 1960 (aged 74); West Berlin, West Germany
- Occupation: Actor
- Years active: 1919-1959
- Spouse: Carola Toelle (m. 1919; div. 1925)

Ernst Stahl-Nachbaur (6 March 1886 – 13 May 1960) was a German film actor.

== Early life ==
Stahl-Nachbaur was born in Munich, Germany and died at age 74 in West Berlin.

== Selected filmography ==
- Das Geschlecht der Schelme. 1. Teil (1917)
- Das verlorene Paradies (1917)
- Eugen Onegin (1919) - Fürst Gremin
- Zwischen Tod und Leben (1919) - Fritz Nettenmair
- Fidelio (1919) - Gouveneur
- Pogrom (1919) - Krassowsky
- Maria Pavlowna (1919) - Polizist Maximowitsch
- Aus eines Mannes Mädchenjahren (1919)
- König Nicolo (1919) - King Nicolo
- Lillis Ehe (1919) - Dr. Goldmann
- Lilli (1919) - Count von Simon
- Zwischen neun und neun (1919) - Stanislaus Demba
- Zwangsliebe im Freistaat (1919) - Dr. Erhardt Kraft
- Der verführte Heilige (1919)
- Gewalt gegen Recht (1920) - Minister
- Satanas (1920) - Prince Alfonso d'Este
- Die Welt ohne Hunger (1920) - Fred Bell
- Narrentanz der Liebe (1920) - Student Alfred Freese
- Johannes Goth (1920) - Johannes Goth
- Panic in the House of Ardon (1920) - Welteroberer
- Sieger Tod (1920) - Prof. Ernst Gorrit
- Intrigue (1920) - Luigi Paoli, Sekretär des Marchese
- Nixchen (1920) - Herbert Gröndal (Ehemann)
- The Marquise of O (1920) - Felippo
- The Bull of Olivera (1921) - Leutnant Herbaut
- Hazard (1921) - Der strenge Gatte
- The Amazon (1921)
- About the Son (1921)
- The Oath of Peter Hergatz (1921)
- Die Schuldige (1921) - Graf von Friesen
- Christopher Columbus (1923) - Duke of Medina-Celli
- All for Money (1923) - Direktor der Goliath-Werke
- Modern Marriages (1924) - Baron von Norden
- Attorney for the Heart (1927) - James Rigdon
- Under Suspicion (1928) - Commissioner Dr. Bernburg
- Berlin After Dark (1928)
- The Republic of Flappers (1928) - John Enders
- Flucht vor Blond (1928)
- Scandal in Baden-Baden (1929) - John Leeds
- Nachtgestalten (1929)
- Diary of a Coquette (1929) - Consul Hechenberg
- Die Ehe (1929)
- Kolonne X (1929) - Commissioner Weigert
- A Mother's Love (1929) - Erich Vogt
- The Unusual Past of Thea Carter (1929) - Van Ruyten
- The League of Three (1929) - Renard
- Gefahren der Brautzeit (1930) - Mc-Clure
- The Shot in the Sound Film Studio (1930) - Kriminalrat Holzknecht
- Helene Willfüer, Student of Chemistry (1930) - Professor Ambrosius
- There Is a Woman Who Never Forgets You (1930)
- Dangers of the Engagement Period (1930) - Holzknecht, Kriminalrat
- A Student's Song of Heidelberg (1930) - John Miller
- Boycott (1930) - Generaldirektor Haller
- Woman in the Jungle (1931) - Robert Crosbie
- Danton (1931) - Louis XVI
- Fra Diavolo (1931) - Der Gouverneur
- M (1931) - Police Chief
- Der Kongreß tanzt (1931) - Napoleon I. (uncredited)
- The Men Around Lucy (1931) - Prunier
- The Daredevil (1931) - George Brown aka Mac Born
- Wäsche - Waschen - Wohlergehen (1932) - Kaufmann
- Hasenklein kann nichts dafür (1932) - Jänicke - Generaldirektor
- The Eleven Schill Officers (1932) - Hauptmann Busch
- Dreaming Lips (1932) - Polizist
- Weiße Majestät (1933) - Defense lawyer
- Abenteuer eines jungen Herrn in Polen (1934) - Oberst von Keller
- Glückspilze (1935) - Dr. Kahn
- Strife Over the Boy Jo (1937) - Frauenarzt Prof. Desmartin
- Das Ehesanatorium (1938) - Rudolf Burg
- Spaßvögel (1939) - Dr. Rose
- Das Herz der Königin (1940) - Jon Knox
- Immer nur Du (1941) - Der Filmregisseur
- Der große Schatten (1942) - Intendant des Provinztheaters
- The War of the Oxen (1943) - Heinrich von Burghausen
- Titanic (1943) - Oberrichter (uncredited)
- Ein glücklicher Mensch (1943) - Philologe
- Opfergang (1944) - Sanitätsrat Terboven
- The Murderers Are Among Us (1946) - Arzt
- Allez Hopp (1946) - Urmann
- Chased by the Devil (1950) - Professor Schmederlein
- Die Tat des Anderen (1951)
- Border Post 58 (1951) - Kriminalkommissar Bernrieder
- Turtledove General Delivery (1952) - Arthur Gomoll, Generaldirektor
- Mein Herz darfst du nicht fragen (1952) - Professor
- Ave Maria (1953) - Dr. Rieser
- Captain Wronski (1954) - Ein deutscher Abwehrgeneral
- The Angel with the Flaming Sword (1954)
- The Confession of Ina Kahr (1954)
- Canaris (1954)
- Ein Mann vergißt die Liebe (1955)
- The Plot to Assassinate Hitler (1955) - Feldmarschall, Oberfehlshaber einer Heeresgruppe
- Der Hauptmann und sein Held (1955) - General
- One Woman Is Not Enough? (1955) - Dr. Dickreiter
- Spy for Germany (1956) - Atomprofessor
- Stresemann (1957) - Stresemann's Doctor
- Kalle wird Bürgermeister (1957)
- Nackt wie Gott sie schuf (1958) - Prior
- Der Schinderhannes (1958) - Kasper Bückler
- Old Heidelberg (1959) - Fürst von Sachsen-Karlsburg (final film role)
