= The Clan (1920 film) =

1920 film directed by Carl Wilhelm

- German: Die Sippschaft
- Directed by: Carl Wilhelm
- Written by: Carl Wilhelm; Ruth Goetz
- Produced by: Carl Wilhelm
- Starring: Ressel Orla; Johannes Riemann; Conrad Veidt
- Cinematography: Kurt Lande
- Production company: Carl Wilhelm-Film
- Distributed by: Terra Film
- Release date: 24 September 1920
- Country: Germany
- Languages: Silent; German intertitles

The Clan (German: Die Sippschaft) is a 1920 German silent drama film directed by Carl Wilhelm and starring Ressel Orla, Johannes Riemann and Conrad Veidt.

== Cast ==
In alphabetical order

- Josefine Dora as President of the Kaffeeklatsch-Clubs
- Loo Hardy
- Charles Willy Kayser
- Ressel Orla
- Harald Paulsen
- Hedwig Pauly-Winterstein
- Martha Rhema
- Johannes Riemann
- Artúr Somlay
- Conrad Veidt
- Hedwig von Lorée
