= Tango Notturno =

1937 film

- Directed by: Fritz Kirchhoff
- Written by: Philipp Lothar Mayring; Rolf E. Vanloo
- Produced by: Hans Conradi; Rolf E. Vanloo
- Starring: Pola Negri; Albrecht Schoenhals; Lina Carstens
- Cinematography: Fritz Arno Wagner
- Edited by: Gertrud Hinz-Nischwitz
- Music by: Hans-Otto Borgmann
- Production company: Fabrikation Deutscher Filme
- Distributed by: Terra Film
- Release date: 22 December 1937
- Running time: 88 minutes
- Country: Germany
- Language: German

Tango Notturno is a 1937 German drama film directed by Fritz Kirchhoff and starring Pola Negri, Albrecht Schoenhals, and Lina Carstens.

The film's sets were designed by the art director Carl Böhm (art director) and Erich Czerwonski. It was shot at the Babelsberg Studios in Berlin.

The film made a hit of Pola Negri's rendition of the song "Ich hab' an dich gedacht" (lyrics by Hans-Fritz Beckman, music by Hans-Otto Borgmann) which gave its title to the film. Negri's role was originally intended for Marlene Dietrich.

== Cast ==
- Pola Negri as Mado Doucet
- Albrecht Schoenhals as Jac Gerard, Composer
- Waldemar Leitgeb as Lincoln, Fliegeroffizier
- Elisabeth Flickenschildt as Bessie Godfrey
- Lina Carstens as Frau Wattson
- Günther Hadank as Untersuchungsrichter
- Hans Zesch-Ballot as Kommissar Trent
- Erich Ponto as Ein armer Kerl
- Karl Dannemann as Smith
- Theo Shall as Phillip, Fliegeroffizier
- Herta Worell as Gladys, seine Frau
- Hans Nielsen as Billy Sefton, Fliegeroffizier
- Kurt Seifert as Webster
- Edwin Jürgensen as Der Kapellmeister
- Jack Trevor as Fliegerkommandant
- F. W. Schröder-Schrom as Der Arzt
- Victor Schamoni as Charlie, Child
- Reginald Pasch as Morris
- Gotthart Portloff as Oberst der Flieger
- Erich Dunskus as Der Gefängniswachtmeister
- Else Ehser as Die Garderobiere bei Mado
- Wilhelm König as Bobby, ein Freund Jacs, Musiker
- Franz Kossak as John, ein Freund Jacs, Musiker
- Karin Luesebrink as Die blonde Animierdame in der Bar
- S. O. Schoening as Der Wirt im Lokal, in dem Smith verkehrt
- Werner Stock as Der Bursche von Käptn' Lincoln
- Bruno Ziener as Der Diener bei den Gerards
- Hanns Waschatko as Billy Seftons Vater
- Angelo Ferrari as Der Inspizient im Nachtklub
- Curd Jürgens as Ein Freund Jacs, Musiker
- Jac Diehl as Ein Kellner

== Bibliography ==
- Kotowski, Mariusz (2014). Pola Negri: Hollywood's First Femme Fatale. Lexington: University Press of Kentucky. ISBN 978-0-8131-4489-4.
