= Louis Brody =

German actor

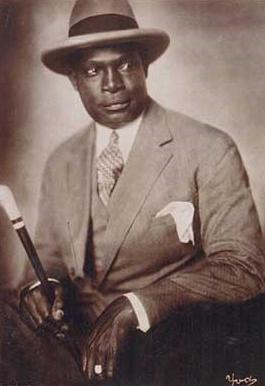
- Born: Ludwig M'bebe Mpessa; 15 February 1892; Douala, Kamerun
- Died: 11 February 1951 (aged 58); East Berlin, East Germany
- Occupations: Actor; musician; wrestler
- Years active: 1915–1951

Louis Brody (born Ludwig M'bebe Mpessa; 15 February 1892 – 11 February 1951) was a Cameroonian-born German film actor, musician and showfighter.

== Biography ==
Brody was born in Douala, in the German colony of Kamerun. His career began in the 1910s after he moved to Germany and lasted uninterrupted throughout the Nazi regime till his death in 1951. Brody engaged also in political work in favour of Afro-Germans as part of the African Aid Organisation, established by and for Afro-Germans living in Germany and was co-founder and president of the Liga zur Verteidigung der Negerrasse. In 1938 he married Erika Diek, the daughter of Mandenga Diek; she was an Afro-German woman from Danzig. Brody remained active and successful as an artist during World War II.

== Selected filmography ==
- Das Gesetz der Mine (1915) as the Black African (film debut)
- The Dagger of Malaya (1919) as Jack Johnson
- The Mistress of the World (1919-1920, part 1, 4-6) as Mallkalle the medicine man / Simba the Chinese servant
- Genuine (1920) as the Malay
- The Secret of Bombay (1921)
- Der Kleine Muck (1921) as Achmet
- The Conspiracy in Genoa (1921) as Mulay Hassan
- The Man Without a Name (1921, part 1, 2, 4-7) as Bill Burns
- Die Abenteuer eines Ermordeten (1921, part 2)
- The Pearl of the Orient (1921) as the Rajah's servant
- Destiny (1921) as Moor / Mohr
- The Poisoned Stream (1921)
- The Indian Tomb (1921, part 1, 2) as Maharadjah's black servant (uncredited)
- The Secret of Santa Maria (1921)
- The Island of the Lost (1921) as the king of the island
- Wildnis (1922)
- Homo sum (1922)
- Lust for Life (1922) as Jimmy
- Das Spielzeug einer Tänzerin (1923) as Brutus
- The Pleasure Garden (1925) as the plantation manager (uncredited)
- The Great Duchess (1926)
- I Once Had a Comrade (1926) as Moor / Mohr
- The Boxer's Bride (1926) as Fighting Bob
- The Armoured Vault (1926) as the chauffeur
- Mata Hari (1927)
- The Last Testament (1929)
- Death Drive for the World Record (1929) as Salto King's servant
- Stürmisch die Nacht (1931)
- No More Love (1931) as the cook
- Calais-Dover (1931) as cook
- Peter Voss, Thief of Millions (1932) as Pascha's servant
- The White Demon (1932) as the theater porter
- Narcotics (1932) as the theater porter (uncredited)
- The Flower of Hawaii (1933) as the waiter
- Hard Luck Mary (1934) as black man
- The Riders of German East Africa (1934) as Hamissi
- Punks Arrives from America (1935) as the barkeeper
- Pillars of Society (1935) as the cowboy
- La Habanera (1937) as Puerto Rican passerby
- The Mystery of Betty Bonn (1938) as Seaman Higgins
- The Impossible Mister Pitt (1938) as Seaman Hannibal
- Rubber (1938) as man (uncredited)
- In geheimer Mission (1938)
- Sergeant Berry (1938) as Berry's neighbor
- Water for Canitoga (1939) as Johnny
- Kennwort Machin (1939) as New York hotel porter
- Brand im Ozean(1939)
- Jud Süß (1940) as Duke's black valet
- Blutsbrüderschaft (1941) as cabaret musician
- Carl Peters (1941) as East African tribe member
- Ohm Kruger (1941) as Lobenguela
- Goodbye, Franziska (1941) as South American hotel porter (uncredited)
- Giungla (1942) as Je-Crois-En-Dieu
- Vom Schicksal verweht (1942) as tribal chief
- Doctor Crippen (1942) as Pedro
- Münchhausen (1943) as Abd al-Hamid's servant (uncredited)
- Germanin (1943) as King Wapunga
- Herr Sanders lebt gefährlich (1944)
- Kolberg (1945) as a Black French soldier (uncredited)
- Peter Voss, Thief of Millions (1946)
- Quax in Africa (1947) as medicine man
- Nights on the Nile (1949) as Egyptian
- The Black Forest Girl (1950) as party guest (uncredited)
- The Last Year (1951) as café patron (final film role)
