= Günther Hadank =

German actor

Eugen Reinhold Günther Hadank (20 October 1892, Berlin – 23 August 1973) was a German actor.

== Filmography ==
Year	Title	Role	Notes
1924	Ssanin	Jurij Swaretschitsch	
1927	Grand Hotel		
1928	Fair Game	Dr. Wellner	
1928	Rasputin	Radlow	
1929	Napoleon at St. Helena	Lord Wellington	
1931	M		Uncredited
1931	Yorck	Seydlitz	
1932	Things Are Getting Better Already		
1932	Goethe lebt...!		
1932	The Black Hussar	Kapitän Fachon - sein Adjutant	
1933	Spies at Work	Hauptmann Larco	
1934	A Man Wants to Get to Germany	Dr. Hellfritz, POW	
1936	Augustus the Strong	Karl XII	
1937	An Enemy of the People	Wenger, Mitarbeiter des Ministers	
1937	Tango Notturno	Untersuchungsrichter	
1938	Nights in Andalusia	Der König	
1938	You and I	Pfarrer	
1938	The Great and the Little Love		
1939	The Immortal Heart	Professor James Kingsley	Short
1940	Friedrich Schiller - Der Triumph eines Genies	General Augé	
1940	Bismarck	Minister Moltke	
1941	Comrades	Major von Muthesius	
1942	Doctor Crippen	Staatsanwalt	
1943	The Endless Road	König Friedrich Wilhelm IV. von Preussen	
1944	Dir zuliebe		
1951	Hanna Amon	Pfarrer	
1951	Man of Straw		
1957	King in Shadow	State Minister	
1957	Vergeßt mir meine Traudel nicht		

== Bibliography ==
- Willett, John. The Theatre of the Weimar Republic. Holmes & Meier, 1988.
