= The Sign of the Malay =

1920 film

- Directed by: Carl Heinz Boese
- Written by: Carl Heinz Boese
- Produced by: Erich Pommer
- Production company: Decla-Bioscop
- Distributed by: Decla-Bioscop
- Release date: 17 November 1920
- Country: Germany
- Languages: Silent; German intertitles

The Sign of the Malay (German:Das Zeichen des Malayen) is a 1920 German silent film directed by Carl Heinz Boese. It was shot at the Babelsberg Studios in Berlin, then controlled by Decla-Bioscop.

== Cast ==
- Alexander Antalffy
- Kurt Brenkendorf
- Ally Kay

== Bibliography ==
- Jacobsen, Wolfgang. Babelsberg: das Filmstudio. Argon, 1994.
- Shulamith Behr, David Fanning & Douglas Jarman. Expressionism Reassessed. Manchester University Press, 1993.
