= The Telephone Operator (1925 film) =

1925 film

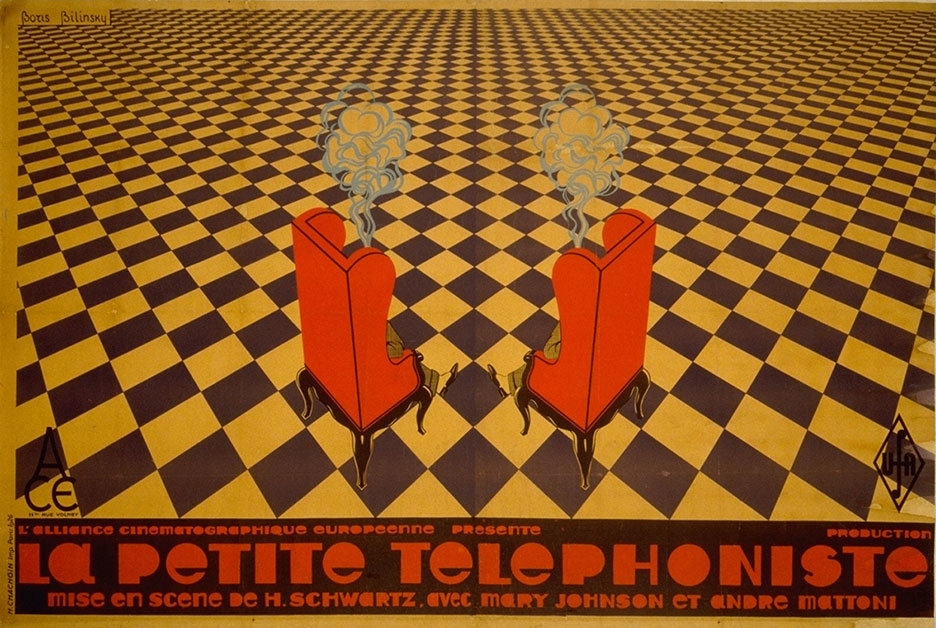
- Poster by Boris Bilinsky
- German: Das Fräulein vom Amt
- Directed by: Hanns Schwarz
- Written by: Henrik Galeen; Adolf Lantz
- Cinematography: Fritz Arno Wagner
- Music by: Giuseppe Becce; Otto Urack
- Production company: Sternheim Film
- Distributed by: UFA
- Release date: 15 October 1925
- Country: Germany
- Languages: Silent; German intertitles

The Telephone Operator (German: Das Fräulein vom Amt) is a 1925 German silent comedy film directed by Hanns Schwarz and starring André Mattoni, Alexander Murski, and Willy Kaiser-Heyl. The film's art direction was by Erich Czerwonski. It was notable for the number of leading UFA technicians who worked on it. It premiered on 15 October 1925 at the Tauenzienpalast in Berlin. It is also known by the alternative title Liebe und Telefon.

== Cast ==
- André Mattoni as Frank Caruther
- Alexander Murski as Baron Josua Caruther
- Willy Kaiser-Heyl as Baron Conrad
- Karl Platen as Jeff
- Kurt Wichulla as Kind
- Frida Richard as Aunt Betsy
- Paul Biensfeldt as Notar
- Frieda Türnowski as neighbour
- Fritz Richard as provost
- Hugo Döblin as usurer
- Lydia Potechina as room landlady
- Ellen Plessow as traveller
- William Huch as valet
- Mary Johnson as Mary Hard
- Margarete Lanner
