= Rhenish Girls and Rhenish Wine =

1927 German silent film

- Directed by: Johannes Guter
- Written by: Walter Reisch
- Produced by: Rudolf Dworsky
- Starring: Xenia Desni; Jack Trevor; Elisabeth Pinajeff; Hans Brausewetter
- Cinematography: Guido Seeber
- Music by: Felix Bartsch
- Production company: Aafa-Film
- Distributed by: Aafa-Film
- Release date: 2 August 1927
- Country: Germany
- Languages: Silent; German intertitles

Rhenish Girls and Rhenish Wine (German: Ein rheinisches Mädchen beim rheinischen Wein) is a 1927 German silent romance film directed by Johannes Guter and starring Xenia Desni, Jack Trevor and Elisabeth Pinajeff. It was shot at the Staaken Studios in Berlin. The film's sets were designed by the art director Jacek Rotmil.

== Cast ==
- Xenia Desni as Hannchen
- Jack Trevor as Baron Wendlingen
- Elisabeth Pinajeff as Juliette Grinot
- Hans Brausewetter as Valentin Hoff
- Paul Biensfeldt as Kammerdiener des Barons
- Adele Sandrock as Hausdame im Schloss
- Hermann Picha
- Ralph Arthur Roberts

== Bibliography ==
- Prawer, S.S. Between Two Worlds: The Jewish Presence in German and Austrian Film, 1910–1933. Berghahn Books, 2005.
