= Hans Janowitz =

German screenwriter (1890–1954)

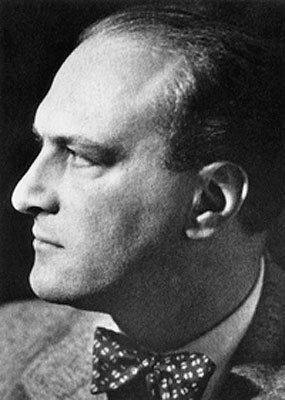
- Born: 2 December 1890; Poděbrady, Austria-Hungary
- Died: 25 May 1954 (aged 63); New York City, United States
- Occupation: Author
- Writing career
- Notable work: The Cabinet of Dr. Caligari
- Movement: German expressionism

Hans Janowitz (2 December 1890 – 25 May 1954) was a German author.

Janowitz was an officer in World War I, but returned from it as a pacifist. Shortly after the war ended, he met the similarly minded Carl Mayer in Berlin, who suggested he work as an author. Together they wrote the script to The Cabinet of Dr. Caligari (Das Cabinet des Dr. Caligari), which was filmed by Robert Wiene during 1919 and 1920, and released in February 1920. The movie is a prominent work of German expressionism.

Supposedly, the film was at first offered to director Fritz Lang, in the early part of his career, who suggested the now-famous framing story of the madman remembering his past, who then recounts the tale of a girl's mysterious murder, first read about by Janowitz in a newspaper account. Janowitz and Mayer protested the change, but it was made anyway over their objections, and Lang left the project to direct another film. Wiene was then hired to direct the film.

Janowitz then worked with another two movies by F. W. Murnau. As early as 1922, he ended his movie career and became active in the oil business.

== Selected filmography ==
- The Cabinet of Dr. Caligari (Das Cabinet des Dr. Caligari, 1920)
- Der Januskopf (1920)
- Eternal River (1920)
- The Red Masquerade Ball (1921)
- The Black Panther (1921)
- Circus of Life (1921)
- Roswolsky's Mistress (Die Geliebte Roswolskys, 1921)
- Marizza, called the Smuggler Madonna (Marizza, genannt die Schmugglermadonna, 1922)
- The Burning Secret (1923)
