= Country Roads and the Big City =

1921 film directed by Carl Wilhelm

- Directed by: Carl Wilhelm
- Written by: Dimitri Buchowetzki
- Produced by: Carl Wilhelm
- Starring: Carola Toelle; Fritz Kortner; Conrad Veidt
- Cinematography: Carl Hoffmann
- Production company: Carl Wilhelm-Film
- Distributed by: Terra Film
- Release date: 22 April 1921
- Running time: 60 minutes
- Country: Germany
- Languages: Silent; German intertitles

Country Roads and the Big City (German: Landstraße und Großstadt) is a 1921 German silent film directed by Carl Wilhelm and starring Carola Toelle, Fritz Kortner and Conrad Veidt.

The film's sets were designed by the art director Carl Ludwig Kirmse.

== Cast ==
- Carola Toelle as Maria, ein Mädel
- Fritz Kortner as Mendel Hammerstein
- Conrad Veidt as Raphael, der Geiger
- Franz Schönemann
- Richard Georg
- Edmund Heinek

== Bibliography ==
- John T. Soister. Conrad Veidt on Screen: A Comprehensive Illustrated Filmography. McFarland, 2002.
