= Two Under the Stars =

1927 German silent film

- Directed by: Johannes Guter; Ernst Wolff
- Written by: Axel Eggebrecht; Ernst Wolff; Ludwig Wolff (novel)
- Produced by: Albert Pommer
- Starring: Margarete Schlegel; Ernst Deutsch; Jean Angelo
- Cinematography: Theodor Sparkuhl
- Music by: Pasquale Perris
- Production company: Kulturfilm
- Distributed by: Deutsche Lichtspiel-Syndikat
- Release date: 23 December 1927
- Country: Germany
- Languages: Silent; German intertitles

Two Under the Stars (German: Zwei unterm Himmelszelt) is a 1927 German silent film directed by Johannes Guter and Ernst Wolff and starring Margarete Schlegel, Ernst Deutsch and Jean Angelo.

== Cast ==
- Margarete Schlegel as Gina Strohband, Tochter
- Ernst Deutsch as Pierre Marescot, Eintänzer
- Jean Angelo as Thomas Thurneisen
- Margit Barnay as Dorothy, seine Frau
- Leo Peukert as Wilhelm Thurneisen, sein Vater
- Jaro Fürth as Bankdirektor Stroband
- Trude Hesterberg as Isabella, seine Frau
- Otto Reinwald as Helmuth Stroband, Sohn
- Ita Rina as Blanche
- Albert Florath as Maitre Latapie, Lawyer
- Hugo Flink as Baron Siewers
- Charlotte Susa as Baron Siewers Frau
- Betty Astor as Betsy, Zofe bei Thurneisen
- Peter von Hahn as Herr von Dewitz
- Jean Moreau as Sanitätsrat Dr. Grauvogel
- Max Ralph-Ostermann as Der Untersuchungsrichter
- Harry Nestor as Ventajou

== Bibliography ==
- Bock, Hans-Michael & Bergfelder, Tim. The Concise CineGraph. Encyclopedia of German Cinema. Berghahn Books, 2009.
