= The Eyes of the World (1920 film) =

1920 film directed by Carl Wilhelm

- German: Die Augen der Welt
- Directed by: Carl Wilhelm
- Written by: Ruth Goetz; Carl Wilhelm
- Produced by: Carl Wilhelm
- Starring: Conrad Veidt; Ressel Orla; Anton Edthofer
- Cinematography: Carl Hoffmann
- Production company: Carl Wilhelm-Film
- Distributed by: Terra Film
- Release date: 23 July 1920
- Country: Germany
- Languages: Silent; German intertitles

The Eyes of the World (German: Die Augen der Welt) is a 1920 German silent film directed by Carl Wilhelm and starring Conrad Veidt, Ressel Orla and Anton Edthofer.

The film's sets were designed by the art director Artur Günther.

== Cast ==
- Conrad Veidt as Julianne's Lover, Johannes Kay
- Ressel Orla as Juliane van Derp
- Anton Edthofer as Heinz Kay
- Willy Prager as Henrik van Derp
- Emil Heyse as Justizrat ter Holt
- Lotte Koopmann as Dagmar
- Karl Platen as Prof. Hanous
- Fritz Rimpler as Björn
- Berthold Rose as Cellini
- Julius Sachs as Pastor Swensen
- Henny Steimann as Rebekka Kay
- Fritz Witte-Wild as Goldsmith Klaus
- Max Zilzer as Ralph Courtius
