= The Boxer's Bride =

1926 film directed by Johannes Guter

- Soviet poster
- Directed by: Johannes Guter
- Written by: Heinz Gordon; Robert Liebmann
- Produced by: Erich Pommer
- Starring: Xenia Desni; Willy Fritsch; Hermann Picha
- Cinematography: Theodor Sparkuhl
- Production company: UFA
- Distributed by: UFA
- Release date: 2 September 1926
- Country: Germany
- Languages: Silent; German intertitles

The Boxer's Bride (German: Die Boxerbraut) is a 1926 German silent sports film directed by Johannes Guter and starring Xenia Desni, Willy Fritsch and Hermann Picha.

The film's sets were designed by the art director Erich Czerwonski.

== Cast ==
- Xenia Desni as Helen von Vliet
- Willy Fritsch as Fritz Spitz
- Hermann Picha as Siegrfried Spitz, Fritzs Vater
- Teddy Bill as Heinz Gordon
- Harry Lamberts-Paulsen as Ernst Kempers, Boxmeister
- Alice Kempen as Lissy
- Louis Brody as Fighting Bob

== Bibliography ==
- Bock, Hans-Michael; Bergfelder, Tim, eds. (2009). The Concise Cinegraph: Encyclopaedia of German Cinema. New York: Berghahn Books. ISBN 978-1-57181-655-9.
