= Leap Into Life =

1924 film directed by Johannes Guter

- Directed by: Johannes Guter
- Written by: Franz Schulz (novel)
- Produced by: Oskar Messter
- Starring: Xenia Desni; Walter Rilla; Paul Heidemann
- Cinematography: Fritz Arno Wagner
- Production company: Messter Film
- Distributed by: UFA
- Release date: 4 February 1924
- Running time: 83 minutes
- Country: Germany
- Languages: Silent; German intertitles

Leap Into Life (German: Der Sprung ins Leben) is a 1924 German silent drama film directed by Johannes Guter and starring Xenia Desni, Walter Rilla and Paul Heidemann. It features one the earliest film appearances of the future star Marlene Dietrich. It was partly shot at the Johannisthal Studios in Berlin as well as on location around Rügen in the Baltic Sea. The film's sets were designed by Rudi Feld.

== Synopsis ==
A young intellectual falls in love with a circus performer and decides to cultivate her into a lady and marry her. Eventually however she decides to return to her tightrope walker lover.

== Cast ==
- Xenia Desni as Idea - Zirkusartistin
- Walter Rilla as Frank - Ideas Partner
- Paul Heidemann as Dr. Rudolf Borris
- Frida Richard as Rudolfs Tante Sophie
- Käthe Haack as Dr. Borris' Sekretärin
- Leonhard Haskel Le as Zirkusdirektor
- Lydia Potechina as Frau des Zirkusdirektors
- Dr. Gebbing as Dompteur
- Hans Brausewetter as Borris' Freund
- Marlene Dietrich as Mädchen am Strand
- Hans Heinrich von Twardowski as Geiger
- Max Gülstorff as Geiger
- Erling Hanson
- Max Valentin
- Ernst Pröckl
- Hermann Thimig

== Bibliography ==
- Chandler, Charlotte. Marlene: Marlene Dietrich, A Personal Biography. Simon and Schuster, 2011.
