= Ressel Orla =

Austrian actress (1889–1931)

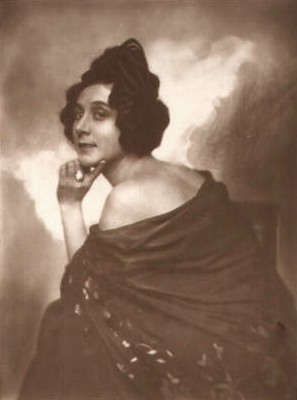
- Born: Theres Anna Ochs; 18 May 1889; Bozen, Austria-Hungary
- Died: 23 July 1931 (aged 42); Berlin, Germany
- Occupation: Actress
- Years active: 1907–1929

Ressel Orla (born Theres Anna Ochs; 18 May 1889 – 23 July 1931) was an Austrian stage and film actress. She appeared in some of Fritz Lang's earliest films.

== Selected filmography ==
- The Firm Gets Married (1914)
- The Queen's Secretary (1916)
- Halbblut (1919)
- Die Spinnen (1919/1920)
- Respectable Women (1920)
- The Clan (1920)
- The Eyes of the World (1920)
- Monte Carlo (1921)
- Hazard (1921)
- The House of Torment (1921)
- Parisian Women (1921)
- The Red Masquerade Ball (1921)
- The Devil's Chains (1921)
- The Prey of the Furies (1922)
- Lust for Life (1922)
- Inge Larsen (1923)
- The Chain Clinks (1923)
- The Third Squadron (1926)
- The Red Mouse (1926)

== Bibliography ==
- Jung, Uli & Schatzberg, Walter. Beyond Caligari: The Films of Robert Wiene. Berghahn Books, 1999.
