= Gustav Adolf Semler =

German actor

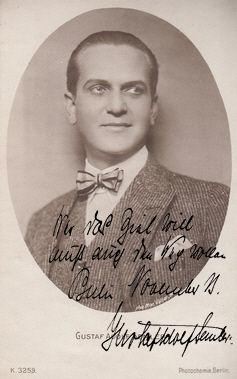
- Born: 14 March 1885; Celle, Germany
- Died: 24 February 1968 (aged 82); Berlin, Germany
- Occupation: Actor
- Years active: 1918–1929

Gustav Adolf Semler (14 March 1885 – 24 February 1968) was a German stage and film actor of the silent era. He appeared in 41 films between 1918 and 1929.

== Selected filmography ==
- Alraune, die Henkerstochter, genannt die rote Hanne (1918)
- Lola Montez (1919)
- The Duty to Live (1919)
- Colombine (1920)
- The Yellow Death (1920)
- The Haunting of Castle Kitay (1920)
- The Black Count (1920)
- Love and Passion (1921)
- Gloria Fatalis (1922)
- Mignon (1922)
- The Violin King (1923)
- The Other Woman (1924)
- People in Need (1925)
- The Violet Eater (1926)
- The Good Reputation (1926)
- Watch on the Rhine (1926)
- The Eleven Schill Officers (1926)
- Eva and the Grasshopper (1927)
