= The Black Panther (1921 film) =

1921 film directed by Johannes Guter

- Directed by: Johannes Guter
- Written by: Hans Janowitz; Johannes Guter
- Based on: a play by Volodymyr Vynnychenko
- Produced by: Erich Pommer
- Starring: Yelena Polevitskaya; Xenia Desni; Eugen Burg; Wilhelm Diegelmann
- Cinematography: Paul Holzki
- Production company: Russo Film
- Distributed by: Decla-Bioscop
- Release date: 14 October 1921
- Country: Germany
- Languages: Silent; German intertitles

The Black Panther (German: Die schwarze Pantherin) is a 1921 German silent film directed by Johannes Guter and starring Yelena Polevitskaya, Xenia Desni and Eugen Burg. The film was produced by Russo Film, a small production outfit associated with Decla-Bioscop, which had been set up to produce films based on literature. The film was adapted from a play by Volodymyr Vynnychenko. It premiered on 14 October 1921 at a Decla cinema on the Unter den Linden.

== Cast ==
- Yelena Polevitskaya as Rita
- Xenia Desni as Vera, Schriftstellerin
- Eugen Burg as Moulin, ein Kunstkritiker
- Wilhelm Diegelmann as der alte Kornej
- Ivan Bulatov as der Gutsverwalter, Ritas Vater
- Leonhard Haskel as ein Agent
- Rudolf Hofbauer as der Kardinal, ein Maler
- Friedrich Kühne as ein Arzt
- Lina Paulsen as Frau des alten Kornej
- Adele Sandrock as die Wirtin einer Kuenstlerkneipe
- Hermann Vallentin as Antonius Qualm, ein Dichter
- Yuri Yurovsky as Kornej, ein Bauernmaler

== Bibliography ==
- Hardt, Ursula (1996). From Caligari to California: Erich Pommer's Life in the International Film Wars. Providence: Berghahn Books. ISBN 978-1-57181-930-7.
- Soroka, Mykola (2012). Faces of Displacement: The Writings of Volodymyr Vynnychenko. Montréal: McGill–Queen's University Press. ISBN 978-0-7735-4037-8.
