= The Tower of Silence (film) =

1925 film directed by Johannes Guter

- Directed by: Johannes Guter
- Written by: Curt Johannes Braun
- Produced by: Erich Pommer
- Starring: Xenia Desni; Nigel Barrie; Fritz Delius; Avrom Morewski
- Cinematography: Günther Rittau
- Production company: Universum Film AG
- Release date: 29 January 1925
- Running time: 100 minutes
- Country: Weimar Republic
- Languages: Silent; German intertitles

The Tower of Silence (German: Der Turm des Schweigens) is a 1925 German mystic melodrama directed by Johannes Guter and starring Xenia Desni and Nigel Barrie. The Tower of Silence is a silent film, and one of the few films by Guter to survive. In 2007, it became the director's first film to be restored for modern audiences.

== Plot ==
The Tower of Silence centres around Eva (Xenia Desni), a beautiful woman kept in a high tower by her grieving widowed father. When an attractive explorer, Arved (Nigel Barrie), is saved by Eva after crashing his car near the tower, he introduces her into high society. When Arved, who was previously believed to be dead, discovers that he has lost his fiancée to ex-partner and aviator Wilfred, he must decide whether to reveal a secret that will destroy his old friend.

== Cast ==
- Xenia Desni as Eva
- Nigel Barrie as Arved Holl
- Fritz Delius as Wilfred Durian
- Avrom Morewski (Abraham Morewski) as Eldor Vartalun
- Gustav Oberg as Ceel
- Hanna Ralph as Liane
- Hermann Leffler as Mac Farland
- Philipp Manning as Werner Neuwitt
- Jenny Jugo as Evi
