= People of the Sea (film) =

1925 film

- Directed by: Léo Lasko
- Written by: Paul Beyer; Reinhold Judis
- Starring: Fritz Kampers; Elisabeth Pinajeff; Fritz Rasp
- Cinematography: Friedrich Erfling; Marius Holdt
- Production company: Berliner Filmladen
- Release date: 1925
- Country: Germany
- Languages: Silent; German intertitles

People of the Sea (German: Menschen am Meer) is a 1925 German silent drama film directed by Léo Lasko and starring Fritz Kampers, Elisabeth Pinajeff and Fritz Rasp.

== Cast ==
- Fritz Kampers
- Elisabeth Pinajeff
- Ernst Pröckl
- Fritz Rasp
- Grete Reinwald

== Bibliography ==
- Bock, Hans-Michael & Bergfelder, Tim. The Concise CineGraph. Encyclopedia of German Cinema. Berghahn Books, 2009.
