= Johannes Goth =

1920 film

- Directed by: Karl Gerhardt
- Written by: Carl Mayer
- Produced by: Erich Pommer
- Cinematography: A.O. Weitzenberg
- Production company: Decla-Bioscop
- Distributed by: Decla-Bioscop
- Release date: 7 May 1920
- Country: Germany
- Languages: Silent; German intertitles

Johannes Goth is a 1920 German silent film directed by Karl Gerhardt and starring Ernst Stahl-Nachbaur, Carola Toelle, and Werner Krauss.

The art direction was by Franz Seemann.

== Cast ==
- Ernst Stahl-Nachbaur as Johannes Goth
- Carola Toelle as Goths Frau
- Werner Krauss as Verleger Assmann
- Claire Creutz as Assmanns Frau
- Josef Rehberg as Prokurist
- Loni Nest as Das Kind

== Bibliography ==
- Hardt, Ursula (1996). From Caligari to California: Erich Pommer's Life in the International Film Wars. Providence: Berghahn Books. ISBN 978-1-57181-930-7.
