= The Pink Diamond =

1926 film

- German: Der rosa Diamant
- Directed by: Rochus Gliese
- Written by: Richard Kepler (play); Hans Rameau; Franz Schulz
- Produced by: Erich Pommer
- Starring: Xenia Desni; Rudolf Klein-Rogge; William Dieterle; Ginette Maddie
- Cinematography: Fritz Arno Wagner
- Production company: UFA
- Distributed by: UFA
- Release date: 8 March 1926
- Country: Germany
- Languages: Silent; German intertitles

The Pink Diamond (German: Der rosa Diamant) is a 1926 German silent comedy-drama film directed by Rochus Gliese and starring Xenia Desni, Rudolf Klein-Rogge and William Dieterle. It was based on the play Karriere by Richard Kepler. The film's sets were designed by Egon Eiermann. It premiered on 8 March 1926.

== Cast ==
- Xenia Desni as Nelly
- Rudolf Klein-Rogge as Stuart, Theater director
- William Dieterle as Tobian
- Ginette Maddie as Bessie
- Hans Rameau as Robert
- Adolf Zurmühl as Regisseur Held
- Alice Hechy as Lady Fox, Revuestar
- Aleksander Marten
- Oreste Bilancia as Direktor Pepperini
- Lydia Potechina as Wirtin zum 'Blökenden Ochsen'
- Max Schreck as Watson - Diener Lady Fox'

== Bibliography ==
- Grange, William (2008). Cultural Chronicle of the Weimar Republic. Lanham, MD: Scarecrow Press. p. 94. ISBN 0-8108-5967-X. LCCN 2008008116.
