= Johannes Guter =

Latvian-born German filmmaker

- Born: Jānis Gūters; 25 April 1882; Riga, Russian Empire
- Died: 18 March 1962 (aged 79); Greifswald, East Germany
- Occupations: Film director, film producer, writer
- Years active: 1917–1944
- Spouse(s): Mirdza Šmitchene, Heidy Wilms (from 1919)

Johannes Guter (born Jānis Gūters; 25 April 1882 – 18 March 1962) was a Latvian-born German filmmaker, screenwriter, and occasional film producer. Although most of his work is now lost, he is considered a pioneer of German silent cinema and expressionism.

== Film career ==
Born in Riga, Governorate of Livonia, Russian Empire, Guter was educated at the Technical University in his home city and made a name for himself as a budding theatrical actor. After the Russian Revolution of 1905, he fled to Berlin in Germany, only to be arrested for the murder of a police officer when he returned to his homeland in 1907. In 1908, after bail was posted, he fled again before his trial, this time settling in Vienna. By 1910 he had directed his first play in Vienna, before moving to Frankfurt where he worked at the New Theatre as a director. In 1917 he was employed at the Hessian State Theatre in Wiesbaden and finally at the Trianon Theatre in Berlin.

At the Trianon Theatre, Guter was first introduced to contacts in the film industry. He directed his first silent movie The Diamond Foundation in 1917, starring his then girlfriend, and fellow Latvian, Marija Leiko. He followed this in 1918 with two more Stuart Webbs detective movies, The Ghost Hunt and Ein rätselhafter Blick, both starring Ernst Reicher in the lead.

In 1919 Guter formed his own production company, Centaurfilm, and in 1920 released Die Frau im Käfig (The Woman in the Cage) his only foray as a producer. In 1920 he signed a contract with Erich Pommer, and during the 1920s his films took on a more fantastical slant, but he also directed melodramas and comedies. His most significant release during this period was his 1925 film Der Turm des Schweigens (The Tower of Silence), which became the first of Guter's movies to be restored and was re-premier at the 2007 Berlin Film Festival. The 1920s also saw Guter directing films with some of Germany's most popular actors, including several films with Willy Fritsch: Blitzzug der Liebe (1925), Die Boxerbraut (1926) and Der Tanzstudent (1928). Despite his connection with the German film industry, Guter spent much of the 1920s living in Latvia, where he spent time attempting to build a Latvian film industry.

The 1930s saw a drop in the number of feature films directed by Guter, though he began directing an increasing number of film shorts, a venture he began in 1929 with Meister des weißen Sports bei bedeutenden Spielen. Guter also directed several cultural films during the 1930s, mainly for Universum Film AG. Between 1939 and 1940 he directed Tran and Helle comedy shorts, Nazi propaganda films which normally accompanied Die Deutsche Wochenschau cinema newsreels. Guter fell out of favour as a director in the 1940s, Ein fröhliches Haus (1944) starring Carla Rust and Rolf Weih, being the only notable production during the 1940s.

The majority of Guter's output is now considered 'lost', and although his work was mostly overlooked by subsequent generations, he is today considered one of the pioneers of early German Expressionist cinema.

== Personal history ==
Guter was first married to Latvian actress Mirdza Šmitchene and in 1919 he married opera singer Heidy Wilms.

== Filmography ==
- The Diamond Foundation (1917)
- The Ghost Hunt (1918)
- Ein rätselhafter Blick (1918)
- Kameraden (1919)
- Die Frau im Käfig (1919, also producer)
- Eternal River (1920)
- Die Frau im Himmel (1920, also co-writer)
- Die Tophar-Mumie
- Das Haupt des Juarez
- Weib und Palette (1921, also writer)
- The Thirteen of Steel (1921, also co-writer)
- The Black Panther (1921, also co-writer)
- Circus of Life (1921)
- Der Mord in der Greenstreet (1921)
- Lust for Life (1922)
- Barmaid (1922, also writer)
- The Call of Destiny (1922)
- Princess Suwarin (1923)
- Leap Into Life (1924)
- The Tower of Silence (1924)
- Express Train of Love (1925)
- The Adventure of Mr. Philip Collins (1925)
- The Boxer's Bride (1926)
- The Queen of the Variety (1927)
- Rhenish Girls and Rhenish Wine (1927)
- Grand Hotel (1927)
- Two Under the Stars (1927)
- At Ruedesheimer Castle There Is a Lime Tree (1928)
- Because I Love You (Der Tanzstudent)(1928)
- The Blue Mouse (1928)
- Meister des weißen Sports bei bedeutenden Spielen (1929)
- In Jena sind alle Mädels so blond (1929)
- Eveline und ihr Rin-Tin-Tin (1929)
- Café Kalau (1929)
- 2. Ungarische Rhapsodie (1929)
- Her Dark Secret (1929)
- Foolish Happiness (1929)
- Alte Kleider (1929)
- Once You Give Away Your Heart (1929)
- Die singenden Babies (1930)
- Donner, Blitz und Regen (1930)
- Goldgräber in Rumänien (1931)
- The Wrong Husband (1931)
- By a Nose (1931)
- The Four from Bob 13 (1932)
- The Triangle of Fire (1932)
- Rundfunk einst und jetzt (1932)
- Geigenzauber (1932)
- Wäsche - Waschen - Wohlergehen (1932)
- Schuberts Lieder (1932)
- Wasch Gemakkelijk, Wasch Voordelig (1933)
- Kannst Du pfeifen, Johanna? (1934)
- Miss Liselott (1934)
- Kampf um Kraft (1935)
- Die Heimat im Lied (1936)
- Don-Kosaken Chor (1936)
- Aus der Schatzkammermusik (1936)
- Am Lagerfeuer (1936)
- Die Stadt der sieben Türme (1936)
- Kampf um Raum und Zeit (1937)
- Bojarenhochzeit (1937)
- Rheinland (1939)
- Twelve Minutes After Midnight (1939)
- In Sachen Herder contra Brandt (1939)
- A Cheerful House (1944)
