= Marija Leiko =

Latvian actress

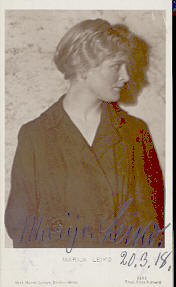
- Born: 14 August 1887; Riga, Governorate of Livonia, Russian Empire
- Died: 3 February 1938 (aged 49); Moscow, Russian SFSR, Soviet Union
- Occupation: Actress
- Years active: 1907–1928
- Children: 1

Marija Leiko (14 August 1887 – 3 February 1938), also known as Marija Leyko, was a Latvian stage and silent film actress in Europe, especially popular in Latvia, Germany, and Russia.

== Life and film career ==
Leiko conquered the German big screen first, starring in The Diamond Foundation (1917), Kain (1918), Ewiger Strom (1919), Die Frau im Käfig (1919) and Lola Montez (1919) as the dancer.

When the silent movie era ended Leiko retired from film acting. After the Nazi seizure of power in 1933, she returned to her native Latvia. In 1935 she visited the Soviet Union and stayed to join the company of the Latvian State Theatre in Moscow.

During the so-called "Latvian Operation" the theatre was shut down, and on 15 December 1937, Leiko was arrested on charges of belonging to a "Latvian nationalist conspiracy". On 3 February 1938 at the age of 50 she was shot and buried in a mass grave at the secret NKVD killing field at Butovo, near Moscow.

Maria Leiko was posthumously rehabilitated for the absence of a crime (corpus delicti) on May 12, 1958.

== Memory ==
A memorial sign, Last Address of Maria Karlovna Leiko, was put up on the wall of house 9, building 3 at Obolensky lane in Moscow on May 14, 2017.

== Filmography ==
- Die Räuberbande (1928)
- The Green Alley (1928) playing Katherina Rezek
- At Ruedesheimer Castle There Is a Lime Tree (1928) playing Fritz's mother
- Aufstieg der kleinen Lilian (1925)
- Dr. Wislizenus (1924)
- The Treasure of Gesine Jacobsen (1923)
- Der Frauenkönig (1923)
- Die Schneiderkomteß (1922) playing the young Comtesse
- Sunken Worlds (1922)
- Children of Darkness (1921, 2 pats) playing Maria Geone
- Die Frau von morgen (1921)
- The Rats (1921) playing Pauline Piperkarcka
- The Fear of Women (1921) playing Reederstochter
- Am Webstuhl der Zeit (1921) (as Marija Leyko) playing Ruth Einser, Hansen's assistant
- Das Opfer der Ellen Larsen (1921)
- Brandherd (aka Verlogene Moral. English release title Torgus) (1921) playing Anna
- The Red Masquerade Ball (1921)
- Die Kwannon von Okadera (1920) playing Ingele von Geortz
- Eternal River (1920) playing Marija
- Satanas (English release tite: Satan) (1920) playing Irene
- Die Frau im Käfig (1919)
- Freie Liebe (1919)
- Lola Montez (aka Am Hofe Ludwigs I. von Bayern) (1919)
- Das Frühlingslied (1918)
- The Zaarden Brothers (1918)
- Die Diamantenstiftung (1917)

== Sources ==
- Guna Zeltina, Anita Uzulniece Russian: Мария Лейко : Актриса театра и кино, 1887-1937 Language: Latvian Riga Liesma 155 pages (Illustrated) January 1989 ISBN 5-410-00276-8 ISBN 9785410002769
