= Carola Toelle =

German actress (1893–1958)

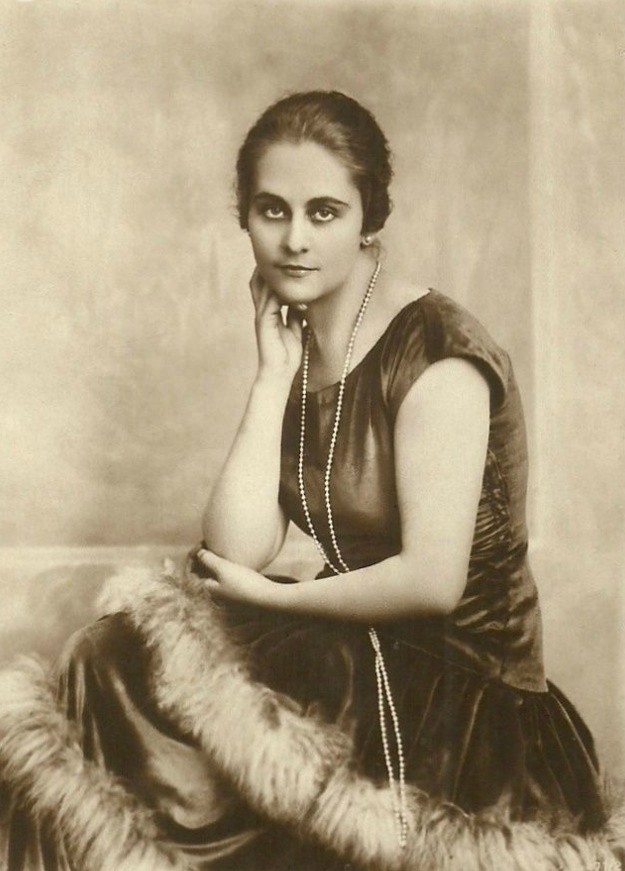
- Toelle ca. 1916
- Born: Henriette Dorothea Helene Karola Toelle; 2 April 1893; Linden-Limmer (Hanover), German Empire
- Died: 28 January 1958 (aged 64); Grunewald (Berlin), West Germany
- Occupation: Actress
- Years active: 1916–1945
- Spouse: Ernst Stahl-Nachbaur (m. 1919; div. 1925)

Carola Toelle (born Henriette Dorothea Helene Karola Toelle; 2 April 1893 – 28 January 1958) was a German stage and film actress. She was the elder sister of the actress Uschi Elleot.

== Selected filmography ==
- Johannes Goth (1920)
- Hazard (1921)
- Country Roads and the Big City (1921)
- Four Around a Woman (1921)
- About the Son (1921)
- The Pearl of the Orient (1921)
- Kean (1921)
- The Flight into Marriage (1922)
- The Man of Steel (1922)
- Christopher Columbus (1923)
- The Red Rider (1923)
- Wedding in Barenhof (1942)
- Immensee (1943)
- Tierarzt Dr. Vlimmen (1944)
- The Enchanted Day (1944)

== Bibliography ==
- Hardt, Ursula. From Caligari to California: Erich Pommer's Life in the International Film Wars. Berghahn Books, 1996.
