= Yuri Yurovsky =

Soviet actor

- Юрий Юровский (Russian); Յուրի Յուրովսկի (Armenian)
- Born: Georgy Ilyich Sarukhanov; 3 May 1894; Tbilisi, Russian Empire
- Died: 30 December 1959 (aged 65); Riga, Latvian SSR, Soviet Union
- Occupations: Actor, director
- Years active: 1919–1955

Yuri Ilyich Yurovsky (Russian: Юрий Ильич Юровский; Armenian: Յուրի Իլյայի Յուրովսկի) was a Soviet actor and director of Armenian origin. People's Artist of the USSR. He worked as an actor and director at Riga Russian Theatre since 1925.

== Selected filmography ==
- 1924 — Die Nibelungen
- 1949 — Encounter at the Elbe
- 1950 — Zhukovsky
- 1952 — The Composer Glinka
