= Tough Guys, Easy Girls =

1927 film

- German: Schwere Jungs – leichte Mädchen
- Directed by: Carl Boese
- Written by: Felix Salten (novel); Luise Heilborn-Körbitz
- Produced by: Carl Boese
- Starring: Lissy Arna; Gustav Fröhlich; Eugen Burg
- Cinematography: Hans Karl Gottschalk
- Music by: Felix Bartsch
- Production company: Carl Boese-Film
- Distributed by: National Film
- Release date: 30 November 1927
- Country: Germany
- Languages: Silent; German intertitles

Tough Guys, Easy Girls (German: Schwere Jungs – leichte Mädchen) is a 1927 German silent comedy film directed by Carl Boese and starring Lissy Arna, Gustav Fröhlich and Eugen Burg.

The film's sets were designed by the art director Max Knaake.

== Cast ==
- Lissy Arna as Adele, ein leichtes Mädchen
- Gustav Fröhlich as Martin Overbeck jun.
- Eugen Burg as Martin Overbeck sen.
- Gottfried Hagedorn as Christoph
- Renate Brausewetter as Tina Schaffner
- Bernd Aldor as Dr. Hans Brunner
- Victor Horwitz as Aloys Mausberger
- Karl Falkenberg as Peter Spieß, Maurer
- Else Reval as Seine Frau Marie
- Fritz Kampers as Der lange Max, Auflader
- Wolfgang Zilzer as Hoppler
- Trude Lehmann as Frau Hoppler
- Hilde Maroff as Bertha
- Walter Karel as Der Kleiderhändler
- Harry Grunwald as Winkelhuber
- Bruno Hoenscherle as Körner
