= The Old Fritz =

1928 film

- German film poster
- German: Der alte Fritz
- Directed by: Gerhard Lamprecht
- Written by: Luise Heilborn-Körbitz; Gerhard Lamprecht; Hans Torius
- Produced by: Gerhard Lamprecht
- Starring: Otto Gebühr; Julia Serda; Bertold Reissig
- Cinematography: Karl Hasselmann
- Music by: Artur Guttmann
- Production company: Gerhard Lamprecht Filmproduktion
- Distributed by: National Film
- Release dates: 20 January 1928 (Part I); 28 January 1928 (Part II)
- Country: Germany
- Languages: Silent; German intertitles

The Old Fritz (German: Der alte Fritz) is a 1928 German silent historical drama film directed by Gerhard Lamprecht and starring Otto Gebühr, Julia Serda and Bertold Reissig. Part of the cycle of Prussian Films, it was released in two parts. Gebühr played the role of Frederick the Great on many occasions during the Weimar Republic and Nazi Germany.

The film's art direction was by Otto Moldenhauer.

== Cast ==
- Otto Gebühr as The Old Fritz (Frederick the Great)
- Julia Serda as The Queen
- Bertold Reissig as Prince Heinrich
- Wilhelm Hertwig as Prince Ferdinand
- Elsa Wagner as Princess Amalie
- Heinz Klockow as Friedrich Wilhelm
- Charlotte Ander as Princess Elisabeth
- Renate Brausewetter as Princess Friederika Luise
- Lilli Breda as Catherine the Great
- Peter von Hahn as Kaiser Joseph II
- Auguste Prasch-Grevenberg as Frau von Camas
- Dina Gralla as Wilhelmine Enke
- Grit Haid as Auguste Enke
- Sybill Morel as Frau Enke
- Gustav Rodegg as Minister Count Hertzberg
- John Mylong as Minister Hagen
- Erich Briese as Minister Graf Finkenstein
- Hermann Böttcher as Minister Brenckenhof
- Franz Stein as Lordmarschall Keith
- Emil Heyse as Marquis d'Argens
- Paul Borgelt as Panin
- Bernd Aldor as Count de Launay
- Toni Zimmerer as General Field Marshal von Braunschweig
- Herbert Knötel as Prince Wilhelm von Anhalt
- Holger-Madsen as General Zieten
- Robert Leffler as General Krusemarck
- Von Klein-Ehrenwalten as General Lentulus
- Karl Junge-Swinburne as General Lestwitz
- Franz Schönfeld as General Prittwitz
- Walter Karge as General Werner
- Robert Baurath as Oberstallmeister Count Schwerin
- W. Focke as Count Borck, Prince's tutor
- Gustav Rudolph as Count Reuß, court marshal
- Ekkehard Arendt as Lieutenant von X.
- Carl Zickner as Reader de Catt
- Robert Forsch as Hofrat Collenbach
- Walter Hahn as Sack, court preacher
- Georg Paeschke as mayor of Berlin
- Albert Ihle as Korporal Lempel
- Fee Wachsmuth as Tine
- W. Markwordt as Gotzkowsky
- Hannelore Benzinger as Ziethen's niece
- Albert Gühne as Quanz
- Skowronneck as Page
- Max Maximilian as Moritatenerzähler
- Leon Weill as French language teacher
- Edgar Nollet as Banker Splittgerber
- Julius Unruh as Banker Itzig
- Willy Kruszinski as Banker Ephraim
- Von Lingk as Page
- E. Schurich as Cabinet Council Eichel
- Ida Liebisch as Frau Lempel
- Paul Rehkopf as a beggar
- Irmgard Schallermann as queen's lady-in-waiting
- Paul Scholler as Pfundt, the king's personal coachman
- Max Schreck as Kammerdiener Rietz
- Viktor Senger as Quintus Icilius
- Kitty Sonntag as Electress Marie Antonie von Sachsen
