= The Strange Night of Helga Wangen =

1928 film

- Directed by: Holger-Madsen
- Written by: Laurids Bruun (novel); Holger-Madsen; Bobby E. Lüthge
- Starring: Lee Parry; Francis Lederer
- Cinematography: Alfred Hansen
- Music by: Hansheinrich Dransmann
- Production company: National Film
- Distributed by: National Film
- Release date: 16 October 1928
- Running time: 92 minutes
- Country: Germany
- Languages: Silent; German intertitles

The Strange Night of Helga Wangen (German: Die seltsame Nacht der Helga Wangen) is a 1928 German silent drama film directed by Holger-Madsen and starring Lee Parry and Francis Lederer. It was shot at the National Studios in Berlin. The film's sets were designed by the art director Otto Moldenhauer.

== Cast ==
In alphabetical order

- Gerhard Dammann as Gendarm
- Gertrud de Lalsky as Mutter
- Otti Dietze as Mamsell Berg
- Karl Falkenberg as Der rote Heinrich
- Paul Henckels as Rentier Hilsoe
- Francis Lederer as Werner Hilsoe
- Georg Paeschke as Arrestaufseher Andersen
- Lee Parry
- Gustav Rickelt as Dr. Sylt
- Eva Speyer as Selma Syndal
- Hugo Werner-Kahle as Knud Hjarner
- Bruno Ziener as Kaspar
