= Anastasia, the False Czar's Daughter =

1928 film

- Directed by: Arthur Bergen
- Written by: Curt J. Braun
- Starring: Lee Parry; Hans Stüwe; Elizza La Porta; Theodor Loos
- Cinematography: Karl Hasselmann
- Music by: Hansheinrich Dransmann
- Production company: National Film
- Distributed by: National Film
- Release date: December 1928
- Country: Germany
- Languages: Silent; German intertitles

Anastasia, the False Czar's Daughter (German: Anastasia, die falsche Zarentochter) is a 1928 German silent drama film directed by Arthur Bergen and starring Lee Parry, Hans Stüwe and Elizza La Porta. It was shot at the National Studios in Berlin. The film's art direction was by Otto Moldenhauer.

== Cast ==
- Lee Parry as Anastasia
- Hans Stüwe as Iwan Wolkoff
- Elizza La Porta as Natascha
- Theodor Loos as Grand Duke Michael
- Olga Engl as Grand Duchess Marja
- Camilla von Hollay as False Anastasia
- Max Landa as Count Glybin
- Maria Forescu as Mrs von Tarski
- Richard Starnburg as Grand Duke Dimitri
- Harry Grunwald
- Gerhard Dammann
- Georg John
- Ernst Behmer
- Wilhelm Bendow
- Hugo Döblin
- Paul Günther
- Erwin Kalser
- Anna von Palen

== Bibliography ==
- King, Greg; Wilson, Penny (2010). The Resurrection of the Romanovs: Anastasia, Anna Anderson, and the World's Greatest Royal Mystery. Hoboken, NJ: John Wiley & Sons. ISBN 978-0-470-44498-6.
