= Kubinke the Barber =

1926 film

- Erika Glässner and Maria Forescu
- German: Kubinke, der Barbier, und die drei Dienstmädchen
- Directed by: Carl Boese
- Written by: Luise Heilborn-Körbitz
- Based on: Kubinke, der Barbier, und die drei Dienstmädchen by Georg Hermann
- Starring: Werner Fuetterer; Erika Glässner; Käthe Haack
- Cinematography: Karl Hasselmann
- Music by: Giuseppe Becce
- Production company: National Film
- Distributed by: National Film
- Release date: 6 August 1926
- Country: Germany
- Languages: Silent; German intertitles

Kubinke the Barber (German: Kubinke, der Barbier, und die drei Dienstmädchen) is a 1926 German silent comedy film directed by Carl Boese and starring Werner Fuetterer, Erika Glässner and Käthe Haack.

The film's sets were designed by the art director Otto Moldenhauer.

== Cast ==
- Werner Fuetterer as Kubinke, barber
- Erika Glässner
- Käthe Haack
- Hilde Maroff
- Erich Kaiser-Titz
- Julius Falkenstein
- Fritz Kampers
- Robert Garrison
- Marie Grimm-Einödshofer
- Eddie Seefeld
- Ferdinand Martini
- Maria Forescu
- Walter Karel
- Eva Speyer
- Antonie Jaeckel
- Gustl Körner
