= The Eleven Devils =

1927 film by Zoltan Korda and Carl Boese

- German film poster
- German: Die elf Teufel
- Directed by: Zoltan Korda; Carl Boese
- Written by: Walter Reisch
- Produced by: Carl Boese
- Starring: Gustav Fröhlich; Evelyn Holt; Lissy Arna
- Cinematography: Paul Holzki; Leopold Kutzleb
- Music by: Pasquale Perris
- Production company: Carl Boese-Film
- Distributed by: National Film
- Release date: 20 October 1927
- Running time: 98 minutes
- Country: Germany
- Languages: Silent; German intertitles

The Eleven Devils (German: Die elf Teufel) is a 1927 German silent sports film directed by Zoltan Korda and Carl Boese and starring Gustav Fröhlich, Evelyn Holt and Lissy Arna. The film's sets were designed by the art director Max Knaake.

== Cast ==
- Gustav Fröhlich as Tommy, the centre-forward
- Evelyn Holt as Linda
- Lissy Arna as Vivien
- Fritz Alberti as Lauren, coach
- John Mylong as Biller, opposing centre-forward
- Willi Forst as assistant coach
- Harry Nestor as Der Kellner
- Geza L. Weiss as boy
