= The Queen of the Baths =

1926 film

- Directed by: Victor Janson
- Written by: Edward Stilgebauer (novel); Jane Bess; Adolf Lantz
- Produced by: Alfred Sittarz
- Starring: Mary Nolan; Walter Rilla; Livio Pavanelli
- Cinematography: Otto Kanturek
- Music by: Austin Egen
- Production company: National Film
- Distributed by: National Film
- Release date: 10 December 1926
- Country: Germany
- Languages: Silent; German intertitles

The Queen of the Baths (German: Die Königin des Weltbades) is a 1926 German silent drama film directed by Victor Janson and starring Mary Nolan, Walter Rilla and Livio Pavanelli.

The film's sets were designed by the art director Jacek Rotmil.

== Cast ==
- Mary Nolan as Micheline Bonnard
- Walter Rilla as Lord Arthur Blythe
- Livio Pavanelli as Marquis
- Camilla von Hollay as Mme. Richemond
- Ida Wüst as Fürstin Wolkonski
- Gertrud Arnold as Lady Blythe
- Ferdinand Hart as Maler Tschakoff
- Lissy Arna as Mannequin
- Eva Speyer as Direktrice
- Alf Blütecher as Gibson
- Paul Morgan as Spieler
- Siegfried Berisch as Spieler
- Oreste Bilancia as Spieler

== Bibliography ==
- Grange, William. Cultural Chronicle of the Weimar Republic. Scarecrow Press, 2008.
