= Slums of Berlin =

1925 film

- Directed by: Gerhard Lamprecht
- Written by: Gerhard Lamprecht; Luise Heilborn-Körbitz
- Starring: Aud Egede-Nissen; Bernhard Goetzke; Mady Christians; Arthur Bergen
- Cinematography: Karl Hasselmann
- Production company: National Film
- Distributed by: National Film
- Release date: 28 August 1925
- Running time: 80 minutes
- Country: Germany
- Languages: Silent; German intertitles

Slums of Berlin (German: Die Verrufenen; English: The Outcasts) is a 1925 German silent drama film directed by Gerhard Lamprecht, based on the experiences of Heinrich Zille. Featuring performances by Aud Egede-Nissen, Bernhard Goetzke, and Mady Christians, it is one of three 'milieu' films by Lamprecht, often referred to as Zille films in homage to their inspiration. Originally intended to be titled Der fünfte Stand (The Fifth Estate), the film was renamed after its completion. The intertitle card displays Die Verrufenen with Der fünfte Stand shown in brackets and smaller text. The film was shot at the Marienfelde Studios in Berlin, with sets designed by the art director Otto Moldenhauer. It was both produced and distributed by National Film.

Set in Berlin in the aftermath of the First World War, the film depicts the lives of two men released from prison. One resumes his life as a petty criminal, picking up where he left off prior to incarceration, and is reaccepted by his social circle. The other, however, faces rejection by both society and his family and must forge a new existence for himself. This is the only film in which Zille himself appeared.

== Plot ==
After being released from prison, the engineer Robert Kramer struggles to reintegrate into bourgeois life. Having taken the fall for a crime committed by his fiancée, he served four years in prison, only to discover upon his release that she has since married a wealthy man. Rejected both by society and his own family, he finds himself unable to secure work, as people everywhere treat him with suspicion. Consumed by despair, he contemplates ending his life. However, he is saved by a street girl named Emma, a sympathetic prostitute who takes him in and helps him regain hope.

When Emma and her brother Gustav become entangled in a robbery-murder and must flee from the police, Robert steps in to assist them. Gradually, his life begins to take a positive turn: he finds employment and a mentor, eventually earning a managerial position at a factory in Düsseldorf. Yet, when he returns to Berlin to reunite with Emma, he finds her on her deathbed and must bid her a poignant farewell.

== Production ==
The film's production was initiated and supported by Adolf Heilborn, the brother of Lamprecht's collaborator Luise Heilborn-Körbitz, who was a doctor, writer, and a personal friend of Heinrich Zille. While Erich Pommer of "Decla-Bioscop" and the producers at "Gloria" considered the subject matter unpopular and hesitated to pursue it, Lamprecht found an ally in Franz Vogel, whom he knew from Eiko Film and who, in 1925, was a producer at National Film. Production at National Film A.G. was overseen by Ernst Körner.

The film's sets were created by Otto Moldenhauer, and the cinematography was by Karl Hasselmann. The film was made at the "Terra-Glashaus" studios in Marienfelde, Berlin-Tempelhof, and was submitted for censorship review on 20 July 1925. Its premiere took place on 28 August 1925 at the "Tauentzien-Palast" and simultaneously at the "Union-Theater" Turmstraße. According to Zglinicki, it was "one of the most dazzling premieres Berlin had ever seen." The premiere music at the Tauentzien-Palast was conducted by Giuseppe Becce.

The film reached the United States two years later, on 25 January 1927, where it was titled "Slums of Berlin." It also achieved great success abroad, and was shown in France, Spain, Finland, and Japan.

== Reception ==
In the Hans Ostwald biography of Zille, Heinrich Zille himself comments on Lamprecht's film Der fünfte Stand: "One day, my friend Dr. Heilborn picked me up to view the recordings that had been so carefully made based on my drawings and oral explanations. I watched in amazement as a man, who is neither a painter nor a draftsman, so skilfully draws and paints with photography. Like a child, I delighted in how well Lamprecht understood my drawn pictures...".

Today, the floor is not given to the critic, hardened by a thousand good films and many more bad ones, but to the person deeply moved to the core. I am not ashamed to admit that tears frequently streamed from my eyes. This film is a social act born from a truly Christian sensibility and a love for the poorest of the poor, as those who looked deeper into Heinrich Zille's pictures—beyond their playful surface—were able to see long ago. Max Liebermann, Zille's great painter colleague, aptly wrote about this most Berlin artist: 'Thousands upon thousands pass by the scenes you depict without a second thought, and, if they did notice, even with revulsion, when encountering them in real life. But you are moved by them. Great compassion stirs in you, yet you hurry to laugh about it so as not to be forced to weep. We feel the tears behind your laughter.' This wonderful work is too precious for a telephonic report and the limited space available for it. Every individual achievement—and they were magnificent—deserves closer attention. For now, it can only be said that the unending applause from deeply moved hearts repeatedly rewarded the master and his loyal helpers. National-Film could not have introduced itself better with the first efforts of its new direction than through this achievement, which will be talked about not only in the film world for a long time to come.

— Georg Victor Mendel: Lichtbild-Bühne, Issue No. 165, 29 August 1925

Lamprecht observes a growing weariness of American films among German cinema audiences, which he attributes to "the strong success of genuinely human, non-sentimental subjects that are not kitschy due to cinematic effects" (Film-Kurier, 25 September 1926).

The film Die Verrufenen (1925), Lamprecht's portrayal of the slums of the poorest—showing the courtyards, dilapidated basements, and homeless shelters based on the records of the Berlin painter Heinrich Zille—was claimed by both a sentimentally apolitical Berlin folkloristic milieu cinema and the proletarian film. Following its 1925 premiere in the elegant west of Berlin, the Social Democratic newspaper Vorwärts described it as carrying "the significance of a gospel": "These are all people like you, people who really live, who live under these conditions; children grow up here, in 'homes' so damp that young kittens perish in them..."

Unfortunately, the "milieu" that Lamprecht and Zille approached with "palpable sincerity of intent" (Dahlke/Karl) was quickly shamelessly exploited by opportunistic imitators, who turned the term "Zillefilm" into a questionable label.

== Re-release ==
The double DVD release features Gerhard Lamprecht's Die Verrufenen ("The Outcasts") and Die Unehelichen ("The Illegitimate"), published by the archive of the Deutsche Kinemathek – Museum of Film and Television. The DVD authoring was carried out by Ralph Schermbach, under the supervision of Annette Groschke, with musical accompaniment by Donald Sosin. The release includes a 16-page trilingual booklet. Berlin, 2012.

== Cast ==
- Aud Egede-Nissen (Emma)
- Bernhard Goetzke (Robert Kramer, engineer)
- Mady Christians (Regine Lossen)
- Arthur Bergen (Gustav)
- Frigga Braut (Washerwoman)
- Georg John (Washerwoman's husband)
- Eduard Rothauser (Rottmann)
- Frida Richard (Frau Heinicke)
- Paul Bildt (Herr Kramer)
- Hildegard Imhof (Gerda)
- Christian Bummerstedt (Regine's brother)
- Rudolf Biebrach (Trader/Merchant)
- Aribert Wäscher (Klatte)
- Margarete Kupfer (Manager)
- Maria Forescu (Frau Flickschneider)
- Rudolf del Zopp
- Paul Günther
- Robert Garrison
- Robert Graff
- Max Maximilian
- Sylvia Torf

== Bibliography ==
- Jelavich, Peter (2005). Berlin Alexanderplatz: Radio, Film, and the Death of Weimar Culture. Berkeley: University of California Press. ISBN 978-0-520-24363-7.
- Murray, Bruce Arthur (1990). Film and the German Left in the Weimar Republic: From Caligari to Kuhle Wampe. Austin: University of Texas Press. ISBN 978-0-292-72465-5.
