= Lemke's Widow (1928 film) =

1928 film directed by Carl Boese

- Directed by: Carl Boese
- Written by: Carl Boese; Erdmann Graeser (novel); Luise Heilborn-Körbitz
- Produced by: Carl Boese
- Cinematography: Karl Hasselmann
- Music by: Hansheinrich Dransmann
- Production company: Carl Boese-Film
- Distributed by: National Film
- Release date: 28 December 1928
- Running time: 99 minutes
- Country: Germany
- Languages: Silent; German intertitles

Lemke's Widow (German: Lemkes sel. Witwe) is a 1928 German silent comedy film directed by Carl Boese. It was shot at the National Studios in Berlin. The film's sets were designed by Karl Machus. The film was remade in 1957 with Grethe Weiser in the title role.

== Cast ==
In alphabetical order

- Lissy Arna
- Hannelore Benzinger
- Gerhard Dammann
- Josefine Dora
- Harry Grunwald
- Fritz Kampers
- Margarete Kupfer
- Max Maximilian
- Sophie Pagay
- Hermann Picha
- Frida Richard
- Gustav Rickelt
- Paul Westermeier
- Emmy Wyda
- Wolfgang Zilzer

== Bibliography ==
- Goble, Alan. The Complete Index to Literary Sources in Film. Walter de Gruyter, 1999.
