= Madame Bovary (1937 film) =

1937 film

- Directed by: Gerhard Lamprecht
- Written by: Erich Ebermayer; Hans Neumann
- Based on: Madame Bovary; 1857 novel by Gustave Flaubert
- Produced by: Gerhard Lamprecht
- Starring: Pola Negri; Aribert Wäscher; Ferdinand Marian; Werner Scharf
- Cinematography: Karl Hasselmann
- Edited by: Gerhard Lamprecht
- Music by: Giuseppe Becce
- Production company: Euphono-Film
- Distributed by: Terra Film
- Release date: 23 April 1937
- Running time: 95 minutes
- Country: Germany
- Language: German

Madame Bovary is a 1937 German historical drama film directed by Gerhard Lamprecht and starring Pola Negri, Aribert Wäscher and Ferdinand Marian. It is an adaptation of Gustave Flaubert's 1857 novel Madame Bovary. It was shot at the Babelsberg Studios in Potsdam. The film's sets were designed by the art director Otto Moldenhauer.

== Cast ==
- Pola Negri as Emma Bovary
- Aribert Wäscher as Charles Bovary
- Ferdinand Marian as Rodolphe Boulanger
- Werner Scharf as Léon Dupuis
- Alexander Engel as Homais, Apoteker
- Paul Bildt as L'heureux
- Olga Limburg as Madame Lefrançois
- Karl Hellmer as Binet
- Katharina Brauren as Madame Homais
- Werner Stock as Justin, Apoteker Helper
- Carla Rust as Félicité
- Rudolf Klein-Rogge as Prof. Canivet
- Eduard von Winterstein as Huret
- Barbara von Annenkoff as Marquise de Andervillier
- Georg H. Schnell as Marquis de Andervillier
- Franz Stein as Herzog de Laverrière
- Bertold Reissig as Hyppolite
- Johannes Bergfeldt as Amandé
- Gerhard Dammann as Robinet, Bauer
- Angelo Ferrari as Gast bei Marquis Andervillier
- Robert Forsch as Gast beim Empfang des Marquis
- Albert Karchow as Bürger von Yonville
- Alfred Karen as Gast bei Marquis Andervillier
- Hildegard Kiesewetter as Verkäuferin
- Adelberg Ludwigshausen as Jean, Diener
- Edgar Nollet as Gerichtsbeamter
- Hellmuth Passarge as Monsieur Renard
- Ingeborg Peter as Mädchen
- Klaus Pohl as Gerichtsbeamter
- Ulla Ronge as Sylvée
- Lili Schoenborn-Anspach as Fischhändlerin
- Käte Strebel as Gemüsefrau

== Bibliography ==
- Donaldson-Evans, Mary (2009). Madame Bovary at the Movies: Adaptation, Ideology, Context. Rodopi. ISBN 978-90-420-2504-2.
- Goble, Alan (1999). The Complete Index to Literary Sources in Film. Walter de Gruyter. ISBN 978-3-11-095194-3.
