= The Sporck Battalion =

The Sporck Battalion may refer to:

- The Sporck Battalion (1927 film), a German silent war film
- The Sporck Battalion (1934 film), a German drama film
