= Kun en Tigger =

- Directed by: Holger-Madsen
- Written by: Holger-Madsen
- Cinematography: Mads Anton Madsen
- Distributed by: Filmfabrikken Skandinavien
- Release date: 19 June 1912
- Country: Denmark
- Language: Danish

Kun en Tigger is a 1912 Danish silent film directed by Holger-Madsen.

== Cast ==
- Emma Christiansen ... Gouvernante
- Holger-Madsen ... Garnle Johan
- Alma Lagoni ... Mary Anne
- Lau Lauritzen Sr. ... Georges Helmer
- Holger Pedersen ... Tjeneren
