= Eduard Rothauser =

German actor

- Born: 8 December 1876; Budapest, Austria-Hungary
- Died: 24 January 1956 (aged 79); Barcelona, Spain
- Occupation: Actor
- Years active: 1913–1933

Eduard Rothauser (1876–1956) was a Hungarian-born German actor.

== Selected filmography ==
- The Man in the Cellar (1914)
- The Princess of Urbino (1919)
- Nobody Knows (1920)
- The Graveyard of the Living (1921)
- The Maharaja's Favourite Wife (1921)
- The Romance of a Poor Sinner (1922)
- Esterella (1923)
- And Yet Luck Came (1923)
- The Chain Clinks (1923)
- Garragan (1924)
- In den Krallen der Schuld (1924)
- Slums of Berlin (1925)
- The Hanseatics (1925)
- Living Buddhas (1925)
- People to Each Other (1926)
- Manon Lescaut (1926)
- Children of No Importance (1926)
- Mata Hari (1927)
- Schwester Veronica (1927)
- Assassination (1927)
- The Holy Lie (1927)
- Queen Louise (1928)
- Bobby, the Petrol Boy (1929)
- Dreyfus (1930)
- The Trunks of Mr. O.F. (1931)
- A Tremendously Rich Man (1932)
- Marschall Vorwärts (1932)
- Herthas Erwachen (1933)
- What Men Know (1933)

== Bibliography ==
- Hardt, Ursula (1996). From Caligari to California: Erich Pommer's Life in the International Film Wars. Providence: Berghahn Books. ISBN 978-1-57181-930-7.
