= When the Mother and the Daughter =

1928 film by Carl Boese

- Directed by: Carl Boese
- Written by: Edmund Edel (novel); Luise Heilborn-Körbitz; Franz Rauch
- Produced by: Carl Boese
- Starring: Fritz Spira; Trude Hesterberg; Vera Schmiterlöw
- Cinematography: Hans Karl Gottschalk
- Music by: Hansheinrich Dransmann
- Production company: Carl Boese-Film
- Distributed by: National Film
- Release date: 14 April 1928
- Country: Germany
- Languages: Silent; German intertitles

When the Mother and the Daughter (German: Wenn die Mutter und die Tochter...) is a 1928 German silent film directed by Carl Boese and starring Fritz Spira, Trude Hesterberg, and Vera Schmiterlöw.

== Cast ==
- Fritz Spira
- Trude Hesterberg
- Vera Schmiterlöw
- Camilla von Hollay
- Hans Adalbert Schlettow
- John Loder
- Gerhard Dammann
- Erich Kaiser-Titz
- Sybill Morel
- Toni Tetzlaff
- Wolfgang Zilzer

== Bibliography ==
- Krautz, Alfred (1984). International Directory of Cinematographers, Set- and Costume Designers in Film. Vol. 4. Munich: Saur. ISBN 978-3-598-21434-9.
