= Painted Youth =

1929 film directed by Carl Boese

- Film poster
- Directed by: Carl Boese
- Written by: Martin Land
- Produced by: Carl Boese
- Starring: Toni van Eyck; Wolfgang Zilzer; Olga Limburg
- Cinematography: Karl Hasselmann
- Production company: Carl Boese-Film
- Distributed by: National Film
- Release date: 17 April 1929
- Running time: 98 minutes
- Country: Germany
- Languages: Silent; German intertitles

Painted Youth (German: Geschminkte Jugend) is a 1929 German silent drama film directed by Carl Boese and starring Toni van Eyck, Wolfgang Zilzer, and Olga Limburg. It was shot at the National Studios in Berlin. The film's sets were designed by Karl Machus.

== Cast ==
- Toni van Eyck as Margot
- Wolfgang Zilzer as Walter
- Olga Limburg as Renate Hiller
- Maria Ford as Frau Paetzold
- Hugo Werner-Kahle as Oberkonsistorialrat Kuntze
- Gertrud de Lalsky as Kuntzes Frau
- Georgia Lind
- Ruth Albu as Kuntzes Tochter
- Rolf Müller as Fritz
- Kurt Wolowsky as Arthur
- Sophie Pagay as Frau Müller
- Gerhard Dammann as Gastwirt
- Hilde Schewior as Mädchen bei Hillers
- Trude Lehmann as Köchin bei Kuntzes
- Max Maximilian as Bräutigam
- Senta Eichstaedt
- Philipp Manning
- Antonie Jaeckel

== Bibliography ==
- Prawer, Siegbert Salomon (2002). Der Blaue Engel [The Blue Angel]. London: British Film Institute. ISBN 978-0-85170-935-2.
