= Demon of the Sea =

1931 film

- Directed by: Michael Curtiz; William Dieterle
- Written by: Ulrich Steindorff; J. Grubb Alexander; Novel: Herman Melville
- Produced by: Henry Blanke
- Starring: William Dieterle; Lissy Arna
- Cinematography: Sidney Hickox
- Distributed by: Warner Bros. Pictures
- Release date: 12 March 1931
- Running time: 81 minutes
- Countries: United States; Weimar Republic
- Language: German

Demon of the Sea (German: Dämon des Meeres) is a lost 1931 film directed by Michael Curtiz and William Dieterle.

It is the German-language version of the American film Moby Dick. Such multiple-language versions were common in the early years of sound.

== Cast ==
- William Dieterle as Captain Ahab
- Lissy Arna
- Anton Pointner
- Karl Etlinger
- Philipp Lothar Mayring
- Bert Sprotte
