= The Catwalk (film) =

1927 film

- Directed by: Gerhard Lamprecht
- Written by: Luise Heilborn-Körbitz; Gerhard Lamprecht
- Based on: The Cats' Bridge by Hermann Sudermann
- Produced by: Franz Vogel; Gerhard Lamprecht
- Starring: Lissy Arna; Jack Trevor; Andreas Behrens-Klausen; Louise Woldera
- Cinematography: Karl Hasselmann
- Music by: Giuseppe Becce
- Production company: Gerhard Lamprecht Filmproduktion
- Distributed by: National Film
- Release date: June 1927
- Country: Germany
- Languages: Silent; German intertitles

The Catwalk (German: Der Katzensteg) is a 1927 German silent drama film directed by Gerhard Lamprecht and starring Lissy Arna, Jack Trevor, and Andreas Behrens-Klausen. It was based on the 1890 novel of the same title by Hermann Sudermann. The film premiered at the Capital am Zoo in Berlin. Art direction was by Otto Moldenhauer.

== Cast ==
- Lissy Arna as Regine, Hackelbergs Tochter
- Jack Trevor as Boreslav, Baron von Schrandens Sohn
- Andreas Behrens-Klausen as Pfarrer Götz
- Louise Woldera as Helene, seine Tochter
- Max Maximilian as Hackelberg, Sargtischler
- Rudolf Lettinger as Merkel, Ortsschulze
- John Mylong as Felix, sein Sohn
- Gustav Rodegg as Eberhard, Baron von Schranden
- Franz Stein as Landrat von Krotkeim
- Ekkehard Arendt as Engelbert
- Ernst Behmer
- Johannes Bergfeldt
- Käthe Haack
- Egon Kleyersburg
- Bertold Reissig

== Bibliography ==
- Kreimeier, Klaus (1999). The Ufa Story: A History of Germany's Greatest Film Company, 1918–1945. Berkeley: University of California Press. ISBN 978-0-520-22069-0.
