= Lissy Arna =

German actress (1900–1964)

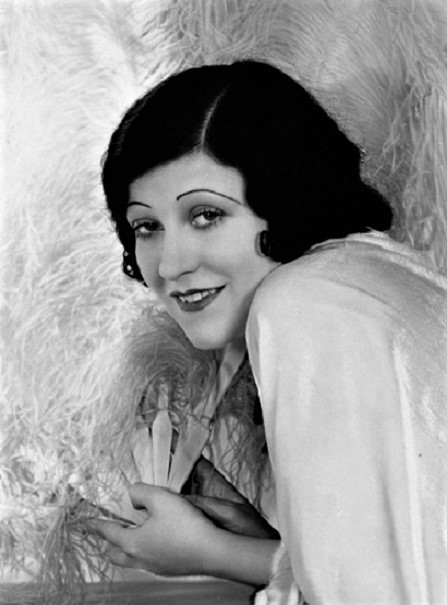
- Lissy Arna in the 1930s
- Born: Elisabeth Arndt; 20 December 1900; Berlin, German Empire
- Died: 22 January 1964 (aged 63); West Berlin, West Germany
- Other names: Lissi Arndt; Lissy Arndt; Lissi Arna
- Occupation: Actress
- Years active: 1918–1962
- Spouses: Hanns Schwarz (m. 1920; div. 1922) Dr. Kleiber (m. 1939, died)

Lissy Arna (born Elisabeth Arndt, 20 December 1900 – 22 January 1964) was a German film actress. She appeared in 63 films between 1918 and 1962. She starred in the 1931 film The Squeaker, which was directed by Martin Frič and Karel Lamač. She entered U.S. films in 1930 under the direction of William Dieterle, appearing in German-language versions of American films.

== Partial filmography ==
- Aus dem Schwarzbuch eines Polizeikommissars, 2. Teil: Verbrechen aus Leidenschaft (1921)
- A Night's Adventure (1923)
- The Elegant Bunch (1925) - Erna Kallweit
- The Woman without Money (1925)
- Adventure on the Night Express (1925) - Gräfin Sonja Waranow
- Die Tugendprobe. Eine lustige Begebenheit von der Waterkant (1926)
- Darling, Count the Cash (1926) - Boxerbraut
- The Queen of the Baths (1926) - Mannequin
- I Liked Kissing Women (1926) - Sybill Malva, Kokotte
- Wenn Menschen irren. Frauen auf Irrwegen (1926)
- The Villa in Tiergarten Park (1927) - Po-Gri, Etvilles Freundin
- When the Young Wine Blossoms (1927)
- The Catwalk (1927) - Regine - Hackelbergs Tochter
- The Bordello in Rio (1927) - Josepha, Alfredos Frau
- The Eleven Devils (1927) - Vivien
- The Famous Woman (1927) - Sonja Litowskaja
- Weekend Magic (1927) - Marcella Ferrari
- Tough Guys, Easy Girls (1927) - Adele, ein leichtes Mädchen
- One Plus One Equals Three (1927)
- The Prince of Rogues (1928) - Julchen Blasius
- The Physician (1928) - Jessie Gurdon
- Eva in Silk (1928) - Helene Hain
- Under the Lantern (1928) - Else Riedel
- Lemke's Widow (1928)
- Children of the Street (1929)
- The Triumph of the Heart (1929) - Märta Tamm
- Beyond the Street (1929) - Die Dirne / The Prostitute
- Poison Gas (1929) - Ellen
- Prisoner Number Seven (1929) - Rabnõ
- The Dance Goes On (1930) - Elly
- The Mask Falls (1931)
- Demon of the Sea (1931)
- Beyond Victory (1931) - Katherina
- Seine Freundin Annette (1931) - Annette Rollan
- The Squeaker (1931) - Lillie / Millie Trent
- By a Nose (1931) - Filmstar, der den Startschuß abgibt
- The Soaring Maiden (1931) - Sonja, Detektivin
- The Unfaithful Eckehart (1931) - Ärztin Fräulein Dr. Drewello
- Mountains on Fire (1931) - Pia, seine Frau
- Der schönste Mann im Staate (1932) - Herta, seine Tochter
- Vater geht auf Reisen (1932) - Anna, Braut von Panicke
- Transit Camp (1932)
- Theodor Körner (1932) - Eleonore v. Prohaska
- Kind, ich freu’ mich auf Dein Kommen (1933) - Lu Thiemann - Fotografin
- Ein Unsichtbarer geht durch die Stadt (1933) - Lissy Verhagen
- Inge and the Millions (1933) - Kitty, Freundin von Conrady
- ...heute abend bei mir (1934) - Wanja Perescu
- What Am I Without You (1934) - Herself
- Men Without a Fatherland (1937) - Mila Wentos
- His Best Friend (1937) - Frau Woerden, Pensionsinhaberin
- To New Shores (1937) - Gefangene Nelly
- The Yellow Flag (1937) - Halbweltdame Pandorita
- Morgen werde ich verhaftet (1939) - Sängerin Giannina Belloni
- Hochzeit mit Hindernissen (1939) - Eugenie Draxler, Rentnerin
- The Sensational Casilla Trial (1939) - Ines Brown
- Life Begins at Eight (1962)
