= Back in the Country =

1936 film directed by Carl Boese

- Directed by: Carl Boese
- Written by: Ernst Hasselbach; Per Schwenzen; Robert Volz
- Based on: Dahinten in der Heide by Hermann Löns
- Produced by: Gustav Althoff
- Starring: Hilde Weissner; Hans Stüwe; Hermann Speelmans
- Cinematography: Georg Bruckbauer
- Edited by: Anna Höllering
- Music by: Eduard Künneke
- Production company: Aco-Film
- Release date: 22 November 1936
- Running time: 103 minutes
- Country: Germany
- Language: German

Back in the Country (German: Dahinten in der Heide) is a 1936 German drama film directed by Carl Boese and starring Hilde Weissner, Hans Stüwe and Hermann Speelmans. It is based on the 1910 novel of the same title by Hermann Löns. It was shot at the Babelsberg Studios in Potsdam and on location around Lüneburg Heath. The film's sets were designed by the art director Otto Gülstorff.

== Cast ==
- Hilde Weissner as Holde Rotermund
- Hans Stüwe as Lüder Volkmann
- Hermann Speelmans as Ramacker
- Helmuth Rudolph as v. Zollin - Gutsbesitzer
- Julia Serda as Seine Mutter
- Helmut Weiss as v. Dongern - Bankier
- Gerhard Dammann as Pächter Lemke
- Herta Saal as Lina - seine Tochter
- Albert Florath as Garberding
- Claire Reigbert as Frau Gaberding
- Kurt Felden as Förster Lohmann
- Gerhard Bienert as Pohl, Gendarm
- Hans Leibelt as Freimut - Kommissär
- Ernst Behmer as Kümmel, Landbriefträger
- Alfred Heynisch as Der Landarzt

== Bibliography ==
- Klaus, Ulrich J. Deutsche Tonfilme: Filmlexikon der abendfüllenden deutschen und deutschsprachigen Tonfilme nach ihren deutschen Uraufführungen. 1936. Klaus-Archiv, 1988.
- Waldman, Harry. Nazi Films in America, 1933–1942. McFarland, 2008.
