= The Page Boy at the Golden Lion =

1928 film directed by Carl Boese

- Scene from a film
- German: Der Piccolo vom Goldenen Löwen
- Directed by: Carl Boese
- Written by: Franz Rauch
- Produced by: Carl Boese
- Starring: Fritz Kampers; Gustl Gstettenbaur; Maria Mindzenty
- Cinematography: Hans Karl Gottschalk
- Music by: Hansheinrich Dransmann
- Production company: Carl Boese-Film
- Distributed by: National Film
- Release date: 27 February 1928
- Country: Germany
- Languages: Silent; German intertitles

The Page Boy at the Golden Lion (German: Der Piccolo vom Goldenen Löwen) is a 1928 German silent comedy film directed by Carl Boese and starring Fritz Kampers, Gustl Gstettenbaur and Maria Mindzenty. It was shot at the Terra and National Studios in Berlin. The film's art direction was by Karl Machus.

== Cast ==
- Fritz Kampers as Fritz Leplow
- Gustl Gstettenbaur as Peter Pohlmann
- Maria Mindzenty as Anna
- Dina Gralla as Gerda von Hohenstein
- Gyula Szőreghy as Walberg, civil engineer
- Julius Falkenstein as Advisor von Gernsdorff
- Paul Rehkopf as Stummelmaxe
- Lu Däne
- Karl Elzer
- Karl Falkenberg
- Eddie Seefeld
