= Aftermath (1927 film) =

1927 film directed by Erich Waschneck

- German film poster
- German: Brennende Grenze
- Directed by: Erich Waschneck
- Written by: Ernst B. Fey; Erich Waschneck
- Starring: Jenny Hasselqvist; Hubert von Meyerinck; Fritz Alberti
- Cinematography: Friedl Behn-Grund
- Music by: Werner R. Heymann
- Production company: Eiko Film
- Distributed by: National Film
- Release date: 3 January 1927
- Running time: 106 minutes
- Country: Germany
- Languages: Silent; German intertitles

Aftermath or Burning Border (German: Brennende Grenze) is a 1927 German silent drama film directed by Erich Waschneck and starring Jenny Hasselqvist, Hubert von Meyerinck and Fritz Alberti. It is noted for its generally anti-Polish tone. It was made at the Terra Studios in Berlin in late 1926. The film's sets were designed by the art director Alfred Junge.

== Synopsis ==
The film is set along the disputed German-Polish borderland after the First World War where clashes between the two sides threaten to lead to bloodshed. The estate of a young widow is threatened when a local Polish commissioner leads his forces to occupy it.

== Cast ==
- Jenny Hasselqvist as Die junge Gutsherrin
- Hubert von Meyerinck as Heino
- Fritz Alberti as government commissioner
- Hans Adalbert Schlettow as Freischarenführer
- Olga Chekhova as Nadja
- Camilla Spira as Marlene - economist
- Hugo Werner-Kahle as Duban - Freischarenführer's adjutant
- Albert Steinrück as Der Gutsvogt
- Gustav Trautschold as old servant
- Oskar Homolka as sailor
- Wilhelm Diegelmann as tavern host
- Frigga Braut as Die dralle maid
- Max Maximilian as cow servant
- Hildegard Imhof
