= Ekkehard Arendt =

Austrian actor (1892–1954)

- Born: 10 June 1892; Vienna, Austro-Hungarian Empire
- Died: 10 May 1954 (aged 61); Vienna, Austria
- Occupations: Film actor Stage actor
- Years active: 1927–1951 (film)

Ekkehard Arendt (10 June 1892 – 10 May 1954) was an Austrian stage and film actor. Arendt served in the Austrian Army during the First World War, before moving to Germany to work in the theatre and film industry. He played the role of Handel Vane in Alfred Hitchcock's 1931 film Mary and the dishonest bank director in The Virtuous Sinner (1931). Arendt later returned to live in Austria.

== Selected filmography ==
- The Vice of Humanity (1927)
- The Catwalk (1927)
- The False Prince (1927)
- The Old Fritz (1928)
- Eva in Silk (1928)
- Phantoms of Happiness (1929)
- The Wonderful Lies of Nina Petrovna (1929)
- The Love of the Brothers Rott (1929)
- Elisabeth of Austria (1931)
- Der Herzog von Reichstadt (1931)
- Louise, Queen of Prussia (1931)
- The Virtuous Sinner (1931)
- Mary (1931)
- Children of Fortune (1931)
- Louise, Queen of Prussia (1931)
- Viennese Waltz (1932)
- Bon Voyage (1933)
- Roses from the South (1934)
- Punks Arrives from America (1935)
- My Life for Maria Isabella (1935)
- Regine (1935)
- His Daughter is Called Peter (1936)
- To New Shores (1937)
- Red Orchids (1938)
- The Rainer Case (1942)
- Vienna 1910 (1943)
- Call Over the Air (1951)

== Bibliography ==
- Prawer, S.S. Between Two Worlds: The Jewish Presence in German and Austrian Film, 1910-1933. Berghahn Books, 2005.
- Sloan, Jane E. Alfred Hitchcock: A Filmography and Bibliography. University of California Press, 1995.
