= Eva in Silk =

1928 film directed by Carl Boese

- Directed by: Carl Boese
- Written by: Ernst Klein (novel); Carl Boese; Luise Heilborn-Körbitz
- Produced by: Carl Boese
- Starring: Lissy Arna; Walter Rilla; Margarete Kupfer
- Cinematography: Karl Hasselmann
- Music by: Hansheinrich Dransmann
- Production company: Carl Boese-Film
- Distributed by: National Film
- Release date: 14 August 1928
- Running time: 120 minutes
- Country: Germany
- Languages: Silent; German intertitles

Eva in Silk (German: Eva in Seide) is a 1928 German silent film directed by Carl Boese and starring Lissy Arna, Walter Rilla and Margarete Kupfer. It was shot at the National Studios in Berlin. The film's sets were designed by the art director Karl Machus.

== Cast ==
- Lissy Arna as Helene Hain
- Walter Rilla as Dr. Erich Stiereß, Schriftsteller
- Margarete Kupfer as Frau Hapke, Zimmervermieterin
- Max Maximilian as Choko-Karl, Zeitungshändler
- Carl Walther Meyer as Alfred
- Gerhard Dammann as Max Bing, Pelzhändler
- Kurt Vespermann as Fritz Jacobsthal, Manager
- Leopold von Ledebur as Generaldirektor Dürr
- Charles Francois as Empfangschef Hotel Adlon
- Alexander Murski as Sir James Reed
- Alfred Graening as Mr. Dewey, englischer Großindustrieller
- Olga Limburg as Mlle. Lossange
- Ekkehard Arendt as Se.Durchlaucht Prinz Rudolf Rüdiger Ottersburg

== Bibliography ==
- James Robert Parish & Kingsley Canham. Film Directors Guide: Western Europe. Scarecrow Press, 1976.
