= Hilde Maroff =

German actress (1904–1984)

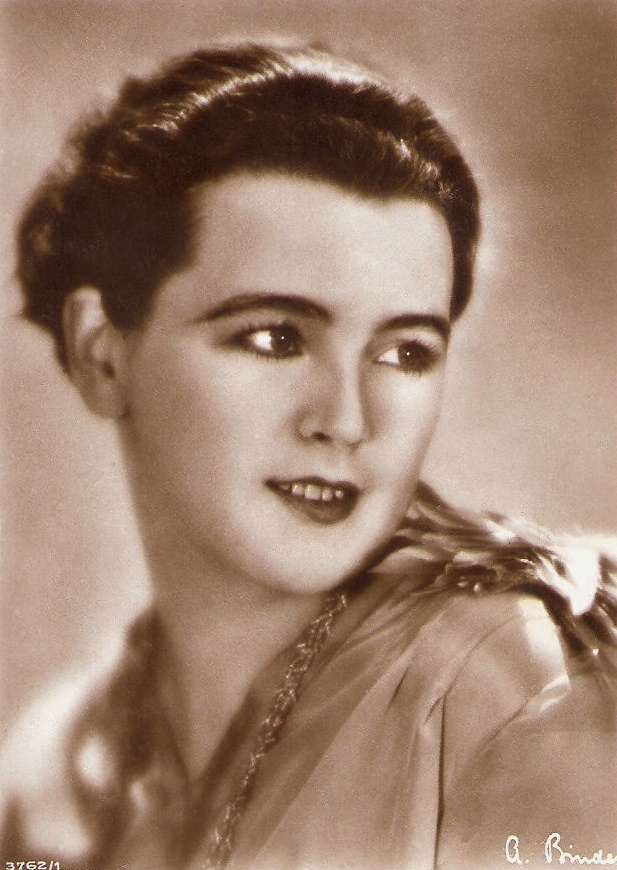
- Born: 5 June 1904; Berlin, German Empire
- Died: 15 August 1984 (aged 80); Berlin, Germany
- Occupation: Actress
- Years active: 1923–1938 (film)
- Spouse: Dr. Kurt Bosse (m. 1929)
- Children: 3, including Peter Bosse

Hilde Maroff (5 June 1904 – 15 August 1984) was a German stage and film actress. She was the mother of the child actor Peter Bosse.

== Selected filmography ==
- Kubinke the Barber (1926)
- Love's Joys and Woes (1926)
- Sister Veronika (1927)
- Men Before Marriage (1927)
- Marie's Soldier (1927)
- The Awakening of Woman (1927)
- Tough Guys, Easy Girls (1927)
- Miss Chauffeur (1927)
- The Cavalier from Wedding (1927)
- The Pirates of the Baltic Sea (1927)
- Flirtation (1927)
- The Three Women of Urban Hell (1928)
- Sir or Madam (1928)
- Fair Game (1928)
- Cry for Help (1928)
- He Goes Right, She Goes Left! (1928)
- Give Me Life (1928)
- A Mother's Love (1929)
- Street Acquaintances (1929)
- The Happy Vagabonds (1929)
- Three from the Unemployment Office (1932)
- What Women Dream (1933)
- An Ideal Husband (1935)
- Mother Song (1937)
- The Woman at the Crossroads (1938)

== Bibliography ==
- Sikov, Ed (2017). On Sunset Boulevard: The Life and Times of Billy Wilder. Jackson: University Press of Mississippi. ISBN 978-1-4968-1265-0.
