= The Unwritten Law (1922 film) =

German silent drama film by Carl Boese

- Directed by: Carl Boese
- Written by: Anneliese Wolfkamp
- Produced by: Isidor Fett; Karl Wiesel
- Starring: Grete Hollmann; Carl Auen
- Cinematography: Gustave Preiss
- Production companies: Bayerische Filmgesellschaft Fett & Wiesel
- Distributed by: Bavaria Film
- Release date: 21 January 1922
- Country: Germany
- Languages: Silent; German intertitles

The Unwritten Law (German: Das ungeschriebene Gesetz) is a 1922 German silent drama film directed by Carl Boese and starring Grete Hollmann and Carl Auen.

It was shot at the Bavaria Studios in Munich.

== Cast ==
- Grete Hollmann
- Marie Escher
- Carl Auen
- Karl Falkenberg
- Toni Wittels
- Josef Bertoli

== Bibliography ==
- Grange, William. Cultural Chronicle of the Weimar Republic. Scarecrow Press, 2008.
