= Werner Scharf =

German actor

- Born: 19 September 1905; Leipzig, German Empire
- Died: 30 April 1945 (aged 39); Rathenow, Germany
- Occupation: Actor
- Years active: 1929-1945

Werner Scharf (19 September 1905 – 30 April 1945) was a German actor. He appeared in more than 45 films between 1929 and 1945.

== Personal life ==
Scharf served in the Volkssturm during the Second World War and was killed in action on 30 April 1945.

== Selected filmography ==
- Impossible Love (1932) as Hagedorf
- Um das Menschenrecht (1934) as Red Leader
- Just Once a Great Lady (1934)
- An Ideal Husband (1935) as Vicount de Nanjac
- The Night With the Emperor (1936) as Adjutant de Brusset
- Under Blazing Heavens (1936) as The Emaos 1st Officer
- A Wedding Dream (1936)
- Madame Bovary (1937) as Léon Dupuis
- The Grey Lady (1937) as Jack Clark
- Sergeant Berry (1938) as Don José
- The Holm Murder Case (1938) as Manuel Albano
- The Impossible Mister Pitt (1938) as José Galvez
- The Muzzle (1938) as Ali
- The Mystery of Betty Bonn (1938) as Seaman Finley
- Woman in the River (1939) as Keryllis
- The Fourth Is Not Coming (1939) as Blomster
- Three Wonderful Days (1939)
- A Man Astray (1940) as Strakosch
- Clarissa (1941) as Paul Becker
- Pedro Will Hang (1941) as José
- Friedemann Bach (1941) as Dresdener Hof's Baron
- The Thing About Styx (1942) as Tschelebi
- Front Theatre (1942)
- Münchhausen (1943) as Prince Francesco d'Este
- Bravo Acrobat! (1943) as Fred Martoni
- The Master of the Estate (1943) as Oskar von Halleborg
- A Wife for Three Days (1944) as Benno Schmitz
- Kolberg (1945) as Pietro Teulié
