= Sister Veronika =

1927 film

- German: Schwester Veronika
- Directed by: Gerhard Lamprecht
- Written by: Hans Müller (play); Luise Heilborn-Körbitz; Gerhard Lamprecht
- Produced by: Gerhard Lamprecht
- Starring: Aud Egede-Nissen; Paul Richter; Hilde Maroff; Arne Weel
- Cinematography: Karl Hasselmann
- Music by: Pasquale Perris
- Production company: Gerhard Lamprecht Filmproduktion
- Distributed by: National Film
- Release date: 12 February 1927
- Country: Germany
- Languages: Silent; German intertitles

Sister Veronika (German: Schwester Veronika) is a 1927 German silent drama film directed by Gerhard Lamprecht and starring Aud Egede-Nissen, Paul Richter, and Hilde Maroff. The film's art direction was by Otto Moldenhauer. It was based on a play by Hans Müller. It premiered on 12 February 1927.

== Cast ==
- Aud Egede-Nissen as Sister Veronika
- Paul Richter as Karl, pharmacist
- Hilde Maroff as Paula
- Arne Weel as Leo, Liftman
- Paul Morgan as Dr. Löwenstamm
- Käthe Haack as Peter's mother
- Paul Bildt as writer in the hospital
- Eduard Rothauser as doctor's assistant
- Elisabeth Neumann-Viertel
- Evi Moog as child
- Fee Wachsmuth as Kind
- Bertold Reissig as physician's substitute
- Robert Leffler as head physician
- Emilie Kurz as nurse
- Ernst Behmer as policeman
- Maria Peterson
