= Unmarried Daughters =

1926 film directed by Carl Boese

- Directed by: Carl Boese
- Written by: Arthur Georg (novel); Jane Bess; Adolf Lantz
- Produced by: Hermann Fellner; Arnold Pressburger; Josef Somlo
- Starring: Jenny Jugo; Charlotte Ander; Ida Wüst
- Cinematography: Robert Lach
- Production company: Felsom Film
- Distributed by: Phoebus Film
- Release date: 22 December 1926
- Country: Germany
- Languages: Silent; German intertitles

Unmarried Daughters (German: Ledige Töchter) is a 1926 German silent film directed by Carl Boese and starring Jenny Jugo, Charlotte Ander and Ida Wüst.

The film's sets were designed by the art director Oscar Werndorff.

== Cast ==
- Jenny Jugo as Eva Munk
- Charlotte Ander as Mela Munk
- Ida Wüst as Frau Munk
- Ernő Verebes as Heidemann
- Gyula Szőreghy as Renz - ein Möbelhändler
- Karl Falkenberg as Hans Graf
- Kurt Vespermann as Stichelmann - ein Maler
- Fritz Spira as Herr Munk
- Livio Pavanelli as Foerster
- Lotte Lorring as Frau Stichelmann
- Trude Lehmann as Anna, Hausmädchen bei Munks

== Bibliography ==
- Parish, Robert. Film Actors Guide. Scarecrow Press, 1977.
