= Blackmailed (1920 film) =

1920 film directed by Carl Boese

- German: Erpresst
- Directed by: Carl Boese
- Written by: Friedel Köhne
- Produced by: Richard Mosch
- Starring: Gertrude Welcker; Ernst Deutsch
- Cinematography: Mutz Greenbaum
- Production company: Mosch-Film
- Release date: 6 February 1920
- Country: Germany
- Languages: Silent; German intertitles

Blackmailed (German: Erpresst) is a 1920 German crime film directed by Carl Boese and starring Gertrude Welcker and Ernst Deutsch.

The film's sets were designed by the art director August Rinaldi.

== Cast ==
- Ernst Deutsch as Manuel Sandt
- Karl Falkenberg
- Ludwig Rex as blackmailer
- Hella Thornegg
- Gertrude Welcker as Ebba Lingg
