= Clarissa (1941 film) =

1941 film

- German film poster
- Directed by: Gerhard Lamprecht
- Written by: Ela Elborg; Georg C. Klaren; Georg Rothkegel; Thea von Harbou
- Produced by: Gustav Althoff
- Starring: Sybille Schmitz; Gustav Fröhlich; Gustav Diessl; Charlotte Radspieler
- Cinematography: Karl Hasselmann
- Edited by: Johanna Meisel
- Music by: Giuseppe Becce
- Production company: Aco-Film
- Distributed by: Various
- Release date: 8 September 1941
- Running time: 79 minutes
- Country: Germany
- Language: German

Clarissa is a 1941 German romance film directed by Gerhard Lamprecht and starring Sybille Schmitz, Gustav Fröhlich and Gustav Diessl. Schmitz plays the domineering manager of a bank who eventually falls in love with one of the other employees.

It was shot at the Althoff Studios in Berlin and on location in Potsdam and the Baltic Sea.

== Cast ==
- Sybille Schmitz as Clarissa von Reckwitz
- Gustav Fröhlich as Lutz Bornhoff
- Gustav Diessl as Feerenbach, manager of the bank
- Charlotte Radspieler as Lotte Becker
- Werner Scharf as Paul Becker
- Elga Brink as Ingeborg von Stahl
- Gerhard Dammann as Köbner, accountant
- Josefine Dora as Friederike
- Olga Engl as Clarissa's aunt Ernestine
- Albert Florath as Ferdinand von Reckwitz
- Liselotte Fülster as Erna Wunderlich, accountant
- Friedl Haerlin as sophisticated customer
- Erika Helmke as Ilse Moll
- Melanie Horeschowsky as Clarissa's aunt Fränzchen
- Käthe Jöken-König as bank's custodian
- Viggo Larsen as Stammler, bank employee
- H. A. Löhr as Waldemar, employee's supervisor
- Edith Oß as Ursel Brennecke
- Klaus Pohl as Huhn, accountant
- Maria Seidler as Edith Feerenbach
- Julia Serda as Frau von Reckwitz
- Werner Stock as Krümel
- Ada Tschechowa as Lore Schneider, payroll accountant
