= Children of No Importance =

1926 film

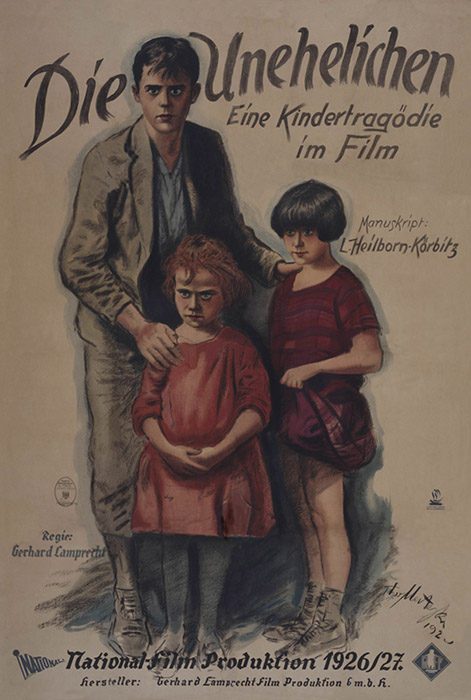
- Theatrical film poster
- German: Die Unehelichen
- Directed by: Gerhard Lamprecht
- Written by: Luise Heilborn-Körbitz; Gerhard Lamprecht
- Produced by: Gerhard Lamprecht
- Starring: Bernhard Goetzke; Margarete Kupfer; Elsa Wagner; Jaro Fürth
- Cinematography: Karl Hasselmann
- Music by: Willy Schmidt-Gentner
- Production company: Gerhard Lamprecht Filmproduktion
- Distributed by: National Film
- Release date: 6 September 1926
- Running time: 70 minutes
- Country: Germany
- Languages: Silent; German intertitles

Children of No Importance or The Illegitimate (German: Die Unehelichen) is a 1926 German silent drama film directed by Gerhard Lamprecht and starring Bernhard Goetzke, Margarete Kupfer and Elsa Wagner. It was part of the series of Enlightenment films produced in Weimar Germany, examining social issues such as illegitimate children.

== Plot ==
A socially aware melodrama delves into the lives of three underprivileged children, each born out of wedlock, residing with foster parents who fail to provide adequate care. The narrative explores the destinies that await these children amidst their challenging circumstances.

== Cast ==
- Bernhard Goetzke
- Margarete Kupfer
- Elsa Wagner
- Jaro Fürth
- Ralph Ludwig
- Fee Wachsmuth
- Margot Misch
- Fred Grosser
- Hermine Sterler
- Max Maximilian
- Eduard Rothauser
- Lili Schoenborn-Anspach
- Paul Bildt
- Käthe Haack
- Hugo Flink
- Ernst Behmer
- Karl Platen
- Trude Lehmann
