= Theodor Körner (film) =

1932 film directed by Carl Boese

- Directed by: Carl Boese
- Written by: Franz Rauch
- Produced by: Gabriel Levy; Rudolf Walther-Fein
- Starring: Willy Domgraf-Fassbaender; Dorothea Wieck; Lissy Arna
- Cinematography: Heinrich Gärtner
- Edited by: Else Baum
- Music by: Werner Schmidt-Boelcke
- Production company: Aafa Film
- Distributed by: Aafa Film
- Release date: 4 October 1932
- Running time: 80 minutes
- Country: Germany
- Language: German

Theodor Körner is a 1932 German historical drama film directed by Carl Boese and starring Willy Domgraf-Fassbaender, Dorothea Wieck and Lissy Arna. It was shot at the Tempelhof Studios in Berlin and on location around Potsdam and Falkensee in Brandenburg. The film's sets were designed by the art director Walter Reimann. Based on the life of the poet Theodor Körner, it is part of the genre of Prussian films that enjoyed great popularity between the wars.

== Main cast ==
- Willy Domgraf-Fassbaender as Theodor Körner
- Dorothea Wieck as Toni Adamberger
- Lissy Arna as Eleonore v. Prohaska
- Sigurd Lohde as Major von Lützow
- Maria Meissner as Frau von Lützow
- Wolfgang von Schwindt as Turnvater Jahn
- Curt Max Richter as Helfritz
- Heinz Klingenberg as Friesen
- Hans Peter Peterhans as v. Humboldt
- Ludwig Trautmann as Vater von Körner
- Martha Maria Newes as Mutter von Körner

== Bibliography ==
- Bock, Hans-Michael & Bergfelder, Tim. The Concise CineGraph. Encyclopedia of German Cinema. Berghahn Books, 2009.
- Kapczynski, Jennifer M. & Richardson, Michael D. A New History of German Cinema. Boydell & Brewer, 2014.
- Klaus, Ulrich J. Deutsche Tonfilme: Jahrgang 1932. Klaus-Archiv, 1988.
- Reimer, Robert C. (ed.) Cultural History Through a National Socialist Lens: Essays on the Cinema of the Third Reich. Camden House, 2002.
