= Louise, Queen of Prussia (film) =

1931 film directed by Carl Froelich

- Directed by: Carl Froelich
- Written by: Fred Hildenbrand Stuart; Friedrich Raff; Julius Urgiß
- Based on: Luise (novel) by Walter von Molo
- Produced by: Wilhelm von Kaufmann; Henny Porten
- Starring: Henny Porten; Gustaf Gründgens; Ekkehard Arendt; Vladimir Gajdarov
- Cinematography: Friedl Behn-Grund
- Music by: Hanson Milde-Meissner
- Production company: Henny Porten Filmproduktion
- Release date: 4 December 1931
- Running time: 115 minutes
- Country: Germany
- Language: German

Louise, Queen of Prussia (German: Luise, Königin von Preußen) is a 1931 German historical drama film directed by Carl Froelich and starring Henny Porten, Gustaf Gründgens, and Ekkehard Arendt. The film's art director was Franz Schroedter.

It depicts the life of Louise of Mecklenburg-Strelitz (1776–1810), the wife of Frederick William III of Prussia. It forms part of the Prussian film genre.

The film was produced by Porten's own production company, founded during the silent era when she was a dominant German star. The failure of the film led to the financial ruin of Porten's production company, and she appeared in far fewer films after this point.

== Cast ==
- Henny Porten as Königin Luise
- Gustaf Gründgens as König Friedrich Wilhelm III
- Ekkehard Arendt as Prinz Louis Ferdinand
- Vladimir Gajdarov as Zar Alexander
- Friedrich Kayßler as Freiherr von Stein
- Helene Fehdmer as Gräfin Voss
- Paul Gunther as Napoleon
- Christiane Grautoff as Knabe
- Inge Landgut as Mädchen
- Friedrich Ettel
- Friedrich Gnaß
- Bernhard Goetzke
- Ferdinand Hart
- Eva L'Arronge
- Aribert Mog
- John Mylong
- Veronika Nargo
- Walter Steinbeck
- Hugo Werner-Kahle
- Paul Westermeier

== Bibliography ==
- Bock, Hans-Michael; Bergfelder, Tim, eds. (2009). The Concise Cinegraph: Encyclopaedia of German Cinema. New York: Berghahn Books. ISBN 978-1-57181-655-9.
- Killy, Walther; Vierhaus, Rudolf, eds. (2005). Dictionary of German Biography. Vol. 8. Munich: K. G. Saur. ISBN 978-3-598-23298-5.
