= Aribert Wäscher =

German actor (1895–1961)

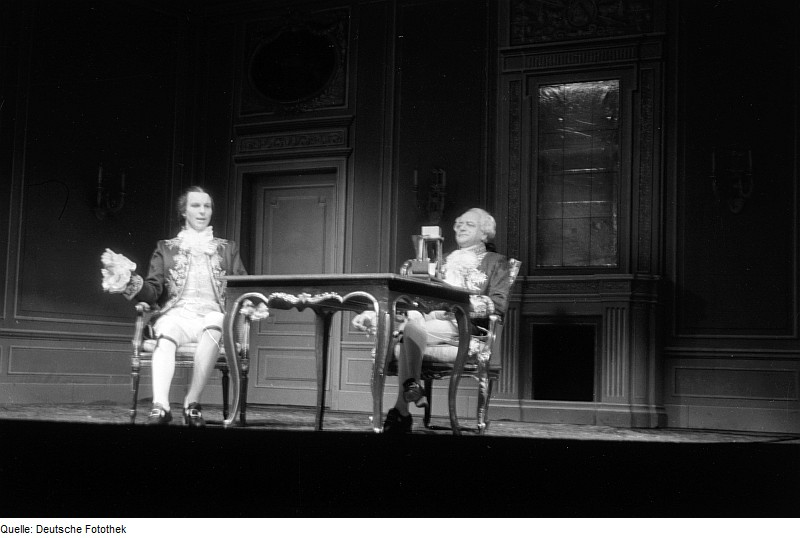
- Horst Caspar as Beaumarchais (left) and Aribert Wäscher as Louis XVI (right). Deutsches Theater, 1946.
- Born: 1 December 1895; Flensburg, German Empire
- Died: 14 December 1961 (aged 66); West Berlin, West Germany
- Other name: Robert Ernst Wilhelm Wäscher
- Occupation: Film actor
- Years active: 1920–1955

Aribert Wäscher (1 December 1895 – 14 December 1961) was a German film actor.

== Selected filmography ==
- The Black Tulip Festival (1920)
- The Graveyard of the Living (1921)
- Slums of Berlin (1925)
- The Hanseatics (1925)
- The Woman's Crusade (1926)
- People to Each Other (1926)
- Princess Olala (1928)
- The Abduction of the Sabine Women (1928)
- The Lady and the Chauffeur (1928)
- Katharina Knie (1929)
- The Flute Concert of Sanssouci (1930)
- Different Morals (1931)
- Under False Flag (1932)
- A City Upside Down (1933)
- Viktor und Viktoria (1933)
- Love, Death and the Devil (1934)
- The Island (1934)
- Paganini (1934)
- Playing with Fire (1934)
- Lady Windermere's Fan (1935)
- Fresh Wind from Canada (1935)
- Stradivari (1935)
- The Higher Command (1935)
- The Private Life of Louis XIV (1935)
- City of Anatol (1936)
- Under Blazing Heavens (1936)
- Stronger Than Regulations (1936)
- Thunder, Lightning and Sunshine (1936)
- Savoy Hotel 217 (1936)
- Donogoo Tonka (1936)
- My Son the Minister (1937)
- Diamonds (1937)
- Madame Bovary (1937)
- Capriccio (1938)
- The Great and the Little Love (1938)
- The Holm Murder Case (1938)
- The Life and Loves of Tschaikovsky (1939)
- Alarm at Station III (1939)
- New Year's Eve on Alexanderplatz (1939)
- The Green Emperor (1939)
- Falstaff in Vienna (1940)
- Jakko (1941)
- Women Are Better Diplomats (1941)
- The Swedish Nightingale (1941)
- Rembrandt (1942)
- Love Me (1942)
- Attack on Baku (1942)
- Tell the Truth (1946)
- King of Hearts (1947)
- The Adventures of Fridolin (1948)
- Thank You, I'm Fine (1948)
- Nights on the Nile (1949)
- The Cuckoos (1949)
- Not Without Gisela (1951)
- Stips (1951)
- When the Evening Bells Ring (1951)
- The Man Between (1953)
- The Big Star Parade (1954)
