= The Man with the Frog =

1929 film

- Directed by: Gerhard Lamprecht
- Written by: Luise Heilborn-Körbitz; Gerhard Lamprecht
- Starring: Heinrich George; Hans Junkermann; Evelyn Holt; Walter Rilla
- Cinematography: Karl Hasselmann
- Music by: Artur Guttmann
- Production company: Gerhard Lamprecht Filmproduktion
- Distributed by: National Film
- Release date: 4 February 1929
- Running time: 80 minutes
- Country: Germany
- Languages: Silent; German intertitles

The Man with the Frog (German: Der Mann mit dem Laubfrosch) is a 1929 German silent crime film directed by Gerhard Lamprecht and starring Heinrich George, Hans Junkermann and Evelyn Holt. The film's art direction was by Otto Moldenhauer.

== Cast ==
- Heinrich George as The Man with the Frog
- Hans Junkermann as Kunsthändler Bruneaux
- Evelyn Holt as Yvette Bruneaux seine Tochter
- Walter Rilla
- Olga Limburg as Lou
- Harry Nestor as René
- Alexander Murski as Henris Vater
- Julia Serda
- Hugo Werner-Kahle as Polizei Präfekt
- Rudolf Biebrach as Kommissar
- Karl Hannemann as Hausdiener
- Maria Forescu as Zimmermädchen
- Hilde Schewior as Zimmermädchen
- Johannes Bergfeldt as Zimmerkellner
- Gerhard Bienert
- Heinrich Gretler
- Franz Schönfeld
- Wolfram Anschütz
- Erika Dannhoff
- Harry Grunwald

== Bibliography ==
- Caneppele, Paolo. Entscheidungen der Wiener Filmzensur: 1929-1933. Film-Archiv Austria, 2003.
