= Sir or Madam =

1928 film directed by Carl Boese

- German: Ossi hat die Hosen an
- Directed by: Carl Boese
- Written by: Luise Heilborn-Körbitz
- Based on: Sir or Madame by Berta Ruck
- Produced by: Carl Boese
- Starring: Margot Armand; Percy Marmont; Ossi Oswalda; Annette Benson
- Cinematography: Karl Buhlmann; Hans Karl Gottschalk; Karl Hasselmann
- Music by: Hansheinrich Dransmann
- Production companies: Foremost Productions; Carl Boese-Film
- Distributed by: Warner Brothers (UK); National Film (Germany)
- Release dates: 1928 (Germany); February 1930 (UK)
- Running time: 6,421 feet
- Country: Germany/United Kingdom
- Languages: Silent; English/German intertitles

Sir or Madam (German: Ossi hat die Hosen an) is a 1928 British-German silent comedy film directed by Carl Boese and starring Margot Armand, Percy Marmont and Ossi Oswalda. It was based on the 1923 novel Sir or Madame by Berta Ruck and shot at Elstree Studios near London. The film was a co-production between Germany and Britain, with separate versions released in the countries. In Britain it was not released until February 1930.

== Plot ==
A woman disguises herself as a man, and poses as a gentleman's valet. She then has to resist the advances of his vampish fiancee.

== Cast ==
- Margot Armand as Patricia Lloyd
- Percy Marmont as Sir Ralph Wellalone
- Ossi Oswalda as Geulda Rhos
- Annette Benson as Lady Day
- Hannelore Benzinger
- Olga Engl
- Cara Guyl
- Fritz Kampers
- Fred Leslie
- Hilde Maroff
- Sophie Pagay
- Karl Platen
- Anna Stranz-Führing
- Wolfgang Zilzer
- Charles Ashton
- Harold Huth
- Lena Halliday
- Edith Barker-Bennett

== Bibliography ==
- Wood, Linda. British Films, 1927-1939. British Film Institute, 1986.
