= Bernhard Goetzke =

German actor (1884–1964)

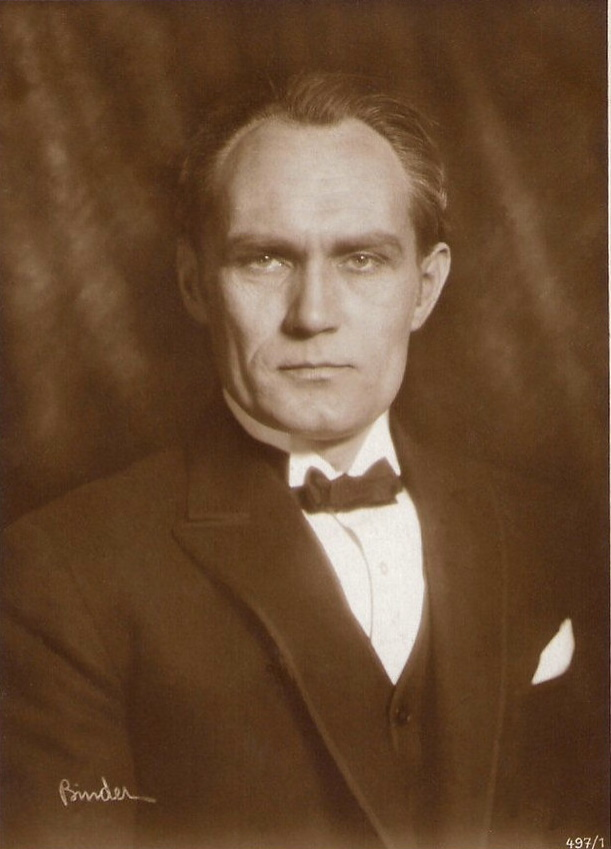
- Born: 5 June 1884; Danzig, German Empire
- Died: 7 October 1964 (aged 80); West Berlin, West Germany
- Years active: 1904–1961

Bernhard Goetzke (5 June 1884 – 7 October 1964) was a German stage and film actor, renowned for his contributions to German silent cinema. Born in Danzig, German Empire (now Gdańsk, Poland), Goetzke began his acting career in theaters across Hagen, Düsseldorf, Dresden, and Berlin. His film debut came in 1917 with Robert Wiene's Furcht (Fear), but his breakthrough roles were in Fritz Lang's films, including Destiny (Der Müde Tod, 1921), Dr. Mabuse the Gambler (1922), and Die Nibelungen (1924). His restrained yet expressive acting style made him a favourite among filmmakers.

== Career ==
After completing his training as an actor, Goetzke worked at theaters in Hagen and Dresden. He later performed on Max Reinhardt's renowned stages in Berlin and was active for several decades at the Schiller Theater.

Goetzke also appeared in international productions, including Alfred Hitchcock's The Mountain Eagle (1926) and Henri Fescourt's Monte Cristo (1929).

With the advent of sound films, he transitioned to both smaller and larger supporting roles. Up until 1933, Goetzke appeared in as many as ten films per year, participating in productions from France, Italy, England, Hungary, the Soviet Union, and Finland.

Under the rule of the National Socialists, art in Nazi Germany was heavily regulated and used as a tool for propaganda. During this time, Goetzke's workload significantly decreased. Despite these challenges, he featured in over twenty films during World War II, mostly in supporting roles.

His later works included celebrated classics like Münchhausen (1943) and The Golden Spider (Die goldene Spinne, 1943), as well as controversial propaganda films such as Jud Süß (1940) and Ich klage an (1941). After 1945, Goetzke shifted his focus to theater and radio, only occasionally appearing on screen. His final acting role was in the 1961 TV production Elisabeth von England as First Lord of the Admiralty.

During the Nazi era, Goetzke was included in the "Gottbegnadeten-Liste" (God-gifted list) shortly before the war's end.

Goetzke died in West Berlin in 1964, leaving behind a legacy as one of the most distinctive faces of German silent cinema. Over his extensive career, he appeared in 130 films between 1917 and 1961.

== Selected filmography ==
- Fear (1917)
- The Last Sun Son (1919)
- The Japanese Woman (1919)
- The Panther Bride (1919)
- Veritas Vincit (1919)
- The Spies (1919)
- The Dagger of Malaya (1919)
- Anita Jo (1919)
- The Law of the Desert (1920)
- The Eyes as the Accuser (1920)
- Dolls of Death (1920)
- The Skull of Pharaoh's Daughter (1920)
- The Conspiracy in Genoa (1921)
- The Indian Tomb (1921)
- The Secret of Bombay (1921)
- Children of Darkness (1921)
- Murder Without Cause (1921)
- Symphony of Death (1921)
- Island of the Dead (1921)
- The Brothers Karamazov (1921)
- Destiny (1921)
- Dr. Mabuse the Gambler (1922)
- The Marriage of Princess Demidoff (1922)
- Peter the Great (1922)
- Die Nibelungen (1924)
- The Blackguard (1925)
- Curfew (1925)
- Letters Which Never Reached Him (1925)
- Slums of Berlin (1925)
- The Last Days of Pompeii (1926)
- The Mountain Eagle (1926)
- Wrath of the Seas (1926)
- Children of No Importance (1926)
- Two and a Lady (1926)
- The Temple of Shadows (1927)
- The Prisoners of Shanghai (1927)
- Assassination (1927)
- The Schorrsiegel Affair (1928)
- Tragedy at the Royal Circus (1928)
- Guilty (1928)
- Death Drive for the World Record (1929)
- Spring Awakening (1929)
- Dreyfus (1930)
- Alraune (1930)
- Cities and Years (1930)
- Louise, Queen of Prussia (1931)
- 1914 (1931)
- The Trunks of Mr. O.F. (1931)
- Checkmate (1931)
- Between Night and Dawn (1931)
- The Mad Bomberg (1932)
- The Black Hussar (1932)
- Rasputin, Demon with Women (1932)
- The Dancer of Sanssouci (1932)
- For Once I'd Like to Have No Troubles (1932)
- Secret of the Blue Room (1932)
- Night Convoy (1932)
- The Eleven Schill Officers (1932)
- Typhoon (1933)
- The Case of Doctor Brenner (1933)
- Victoria (1935)
- Escapade (1936)
- The Czar's Courier (1936)
- Michel Strogoff (1936)
- Robert Koch (1939)
- The Fox of Glenarvon (1940)
- The Three Codonas (1940)
- Jud Süß (1940)
- Between Hamburg and Haiti (1940)
- The Swedish Nightingale (1941)
- A Man With Principles? (1943)
- The Golden Spider (1943)
- That Was My Life (1944)
