= Julia Serda =

Austrian actress (1875–1965)

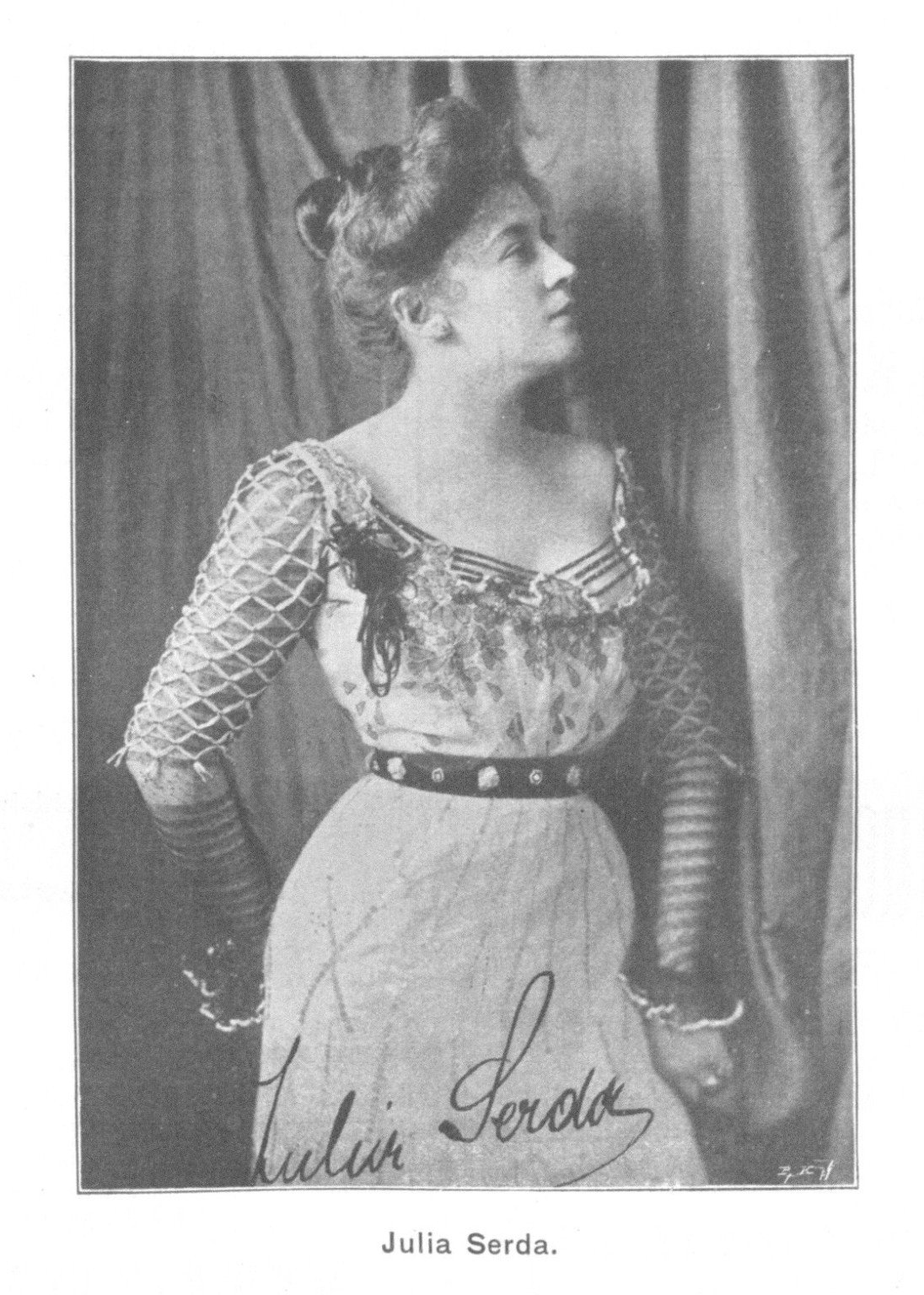
- Julia Serda in 1902
- Born: 6 April 1875; Vienna, Austria-Hungary
- Died: 3 December 1965 (aged 90); Dresden, East Germany
- Occupation: Actress
- Years active: 1895–1944
- Spouses: Karl August Lingner (divorced); Hans Junkermann (m. 1911; died 1943)
- Children: 1

Julia Serda (6 April 1875 – 3 December 1965) was an Austrian stage and film actress. She was married to the actor Hans Junkermann.

== Biography ==
Julia Serda was born on 6 April 1875 in Vienna. She became fascinated by the stage at an early age, taking singing lessons from Pauline Lucca and studying acting at the Vienna Conservatory.

Serda made her debut in 1895 at the theater in Breslau, after which she went to Königsberg for three years.

In 1899 she followed a call to the Dresden Court Theater, to which she remained connected until 1908 and was awarded the title of "Royal Saxon Court Actress". During this time, she also made her Berlin debut in 1902, toured with the Pospischil-Ensemble led by tragic heroine Maria Pospischil in 1906, appeared at the Vienna Burgtheater in 1907, and in 1908 at the Meinhard-Bernauer-Bühnen.

Serda was most successful for playing the naive and sentimental heroine, for example with the title role in Franz Grillparzer's tragedy The Jewess of Toledo, as Oscar Wilde's Salome, or as a cricket in Johannisfeuer by Hermann Sudermann. She also acted as Louise in Intrigue and Love and Leonore in Fiesco.

In 1911, Serda married actor Hans Junkermann. Prior to their marriage, she had been married to Karl August Lingner, with whom she had a daughter, Charlotte Serda (1910–1965), who became an actress and photographer.

In 1914, Serda began working at the Deutsches Schauspielhaus in Hamburg, where she was a part of the ensemble until the 1920–1921 season. She then returned to Berlin, making guest appearances on various stages.

Serda made her screen debut in Erich Schönfelder's Rebel Liesel (1920), starring Ossi Oswalda. She appeared as Austrian Empress Maria Theresa in Fridericus Rex (1922), and acted as Madame de Maintenon in Nanon (1924), opposite Ágnes Esterházy and Harry Liedtke. Her final silent film was The Old Fritz (1928).

Serda successfully made the transition to sound films, and between 1930 and 1944 she acted in over 50 productions, including Maskerade (1934), La Habanera (1937), and The Great Love (1942). Her final screen appearance was in Music in Salzburg (1944) with Willy Birgel and Lil Dagover.

After World War II she ran a private drama studio in Dresden, only occasionally appearing on stage as part of guest performances.

== Selected filmography ==
- Whitechapel (1920)
- The Secret of the Mummy (1921)
- Lady Hamilton (1921)
- Lola Montez, the King's Dancer (1922)
- Tabitha, Stand Up (1922)
- The Golden Net (1922)
- The Mistress of the King (1922)
- The Girl from Capri (1924)
- The Mistress of Monbijou (1924)
- Nanon (1924)
- Darling of the King (1924)
- Anne-Liese of Dessau (1925)
- Old Mamsell's Secret (1925)
- Princess Trulala (1926)
- Sword and Shield (1926)
- The Prince and the Dancer (1926)
- People to Each Other (1926)
- Marie's Soldier (1927)
- The Imaginary Baron (1927)
- The Bordello in Rio (1927)
- A Modern Dubarry (1927)
- A Girl of the People (1927)
- Fabulous Lola (1927)
- The Duty to Remain Silent (1928)
- The Old Fritz (1928)
- It Attracted Three Fellows (1928)
- The Man with the Frog (1929)
- The Living Corpse (1929)
- Atlantik (1929)
- Waltz of Love (1930)
- Retreat on the Rhine (1930)
- A Waltz by Strauss (1931)
- The Office Manager (1931)
- The Murder Trial of Mary Dugan (1931)
- The Spanish Fly (1931)
- Mamsell Nitouche (1932)
- The Little Crook (1933)
- Heinz in the Moon (1934)
- Farewell Waltz (1934)
- My Life for Maria Isabella (1935)
- All Because of the Dog (1935)
- The Cat in the Bag (1935)
- Make Me Happy (1935)
- Regine (1935)
- Last Stop (1935)
- A Woman of No Importance (1936)
- Tomfoolery (1936)
- The Postman from Longjumeau (1936)
- Three Girls for Schubert (1936)
- Back in the Country (1936)
- Signal in the Night (1937)
- Mystery About Beate (1938)
- The Impossible Mister Pitt (1938)
- Monika (1938)
- A Hopeless Case (1939)
- Stars of Variety (1939)
- Who's Kissing Madeleine? (1939)
- Roses in Tyrol (1940)
- Counterfeiters (1940)
- Clarissa (1941)
- The Way to Freedom (1941)
- With the Eyes of a Woman (1942)
- The Great Love (1942)
- Music in Salzburg (1944)

== Bibliography ==
- Grange, William. Hitler Laughing: Comedy in the Third Reich. University Press of America, 2006.
