= Make Me Happy =

1935 film directed by Arthur Robison

- Directed by: Arthur Robison
- Written by: Bobby E. Lüthge; Arthur Robison; Walter Supper
- Produced by: Max Pfeiffer
- Starring: Julia Serda; Albert Lieven; Richard Romanowsky
- Cinematography: Robert Baberske
- Edited by: Herbert B. Fredersdorf
- Music by: Theo Mackeben
- Production company: UFA
- Distributed by: UFA
- Release date: 5 July 1935
- Running time: 96 minutes
- Country: Germany
- Language: German

Make Me Happy (German: Mach' mich glücklich) is a 1935 German musical comedy film directed by Arthur Robison and starring Julia Serda, Albert Lieven and Richard Romanowsky. It was made by Germany's largest film company UFA. A separate French-language version Les époux célibataires was released, also directed by Robison. It was shot at the Babelsberg Studios in Berlin. The film's sets were designed by the art director Otto Hunte and Willy Schiller.

== Cast ==
- Julia Serda as Mrs. Patricia Davenport
- Albert Lieven as William Davenport, her son
- Richard Romanowsky as Lawyer Murphy, her brother
- Harald Paulsen as Henry Davenport, Revueschauspieler
- Ursula Grabley as Fleurette Legrand, seine Partnerin
- Else Elster as Cherry, ein Revuegirl
- Ralph Arthur Roberts as Der Revuedirektor
- Adele Sandrock as Die Garderobiere
- Otto Sauter-Sarto as Der Farmer
- Maria Loja as Seine Frau
- Traute Bengen as Revuegirl
- Emil Biron as Schiffssteward
- Egon Brosig as Barmann
- Fritz Draeger as Reporter
- Anita Düwell as Revuegirl
- Max Harry Ernst as Tänzer in der Schiffsbar
- Fred Goebel as Schiffssteward
- Hedi Höpfner as Tanzpartnerin
- Margot Höpfner as Tanzpartnerin
- Carl Iban as Maskenbildner
- Antonie Jaeckel as Gast bei Lady Davenport
- Alfred Karen as Tänzer in der Schiffsbar
- Jochen Kuhlmey as Matrose
- Paul Luka as Filmregisseur
- Sophie Pagay as Helma
- Klaus Pohl as Cinematographer
- Edlef Schauer as Boy auf dem Schiff
- Wera Schultz as Gast bei Lady Davenport
- Elisabeth von Ruets as Gast bei Lady Davenport
- Ewald Wenck as Theaterinspizient
- Max Wilmsen as Schiffsoffizier

== Bibliography ==
- Kreimeier, Klaus (1999). The Ufa Story: A History of Germany's Greatest Film Company, 1918–1945. University of California Press. ISBN 978-0-520-22069-0.
