= Regine (1927 film) =

1927 film

- Dutch release poster
- Directed by: Erich Waschneck
- Written by: Gottfried Keller (stories); Erich Waschneck; Ernst B. Fey
- Produced by: Erich Waschneck
- Starring: Lee Parry; Harry Liedtke; Vivian Gibson
- Cinematography: Friedl Behn-Grund
- Music by: Werner R. Heymann
- Production companies: Eiko Film; Erich Waschneck-Film
- Distributed by: National Film
- Release date: 29 July 1927
- Country: Germany
- Languages: Silent; German intertitles

Regine (German: Regine, die Tragödie einer Frau) is a 1927 German silent drama film directed by Erich Waschneck and starring Lee Parry, Harry Liedtke and Vivian Gibson. It was shot at the National Studios in Berlin. The film's sets were designed by the art director Alfred Junge.

== Cast ==
- Lee Parry as Regine, die Magd
- Harry Liedtke as Frank Thomas
- Vivian Gibson as Doris Ricarda
- Maria Reisenhofer as Die Generalin
- Antonie Jaeckel as Die Rätin
- Albert Steinrück as Regines Vater
- Oskar Homolka as Robert, ihr Bruder
- Peter C. Leska as Marquis Juan Pedrona
- Hermine Sterler as Die Hausdame
- Wilhelm Diegelmann as Der Professor
- Meinhart Maur as Der Diener

== Bibliography ==
- Bock, Hans-Michael & Bergfelder, Tim. The Concise CineGraph. Encyclopedia of German Cinema. Berghahn Books, 2009.
