= People to Each Other =

1926 film

- Directed by: Gerhard Lamprecht
- Written by: Eduard Rothauser; Luise Heilborn-Körbitz; Gerhard Lamprecht
- Produced by: Gerhard Lamprecht
- Starring: Alfred Abel; Aud Egede-Nissen; Eduard Rothauser; Renate Brausewetter
- Cinematography: Karl Hasselmann
- Music by: Giuseppe Becce
- Production companies: Gerhard Lamprecht Filmproduktion; National Film
- Distributed by: National Film
- Release date: 3 April 1926
- Running time: 108 minutes
- Country: Germany
- Languages: Silent; German intertitles

People to Each Other (1926)

People to Each Other (German: Menschen untereinander) is a 1926 German silent film directed by Gerhard Lamprecht and starring Alfred Abel, Aud Egede-Nissen, and Eduard Rothauser. The film's art direction was by Otto Moldenhauer.

== Cast ==
- Alfred Abel as Helmuth Köhler
- Aud Egede-Nissen as Gertrud Köhler
- Eduard Rothauser
- Renate Brausewetter
- Bertold Reissig
- Paul Bildt
- Elsa Wagner
- Mathilde Sussin
- Andreas Bull
- Max Maximilian
- Käthe Haack
- Erika Glässner
- Margarete Kupfer
- Lydia Potechina
- Grit Haid
- Olga Limburg
- Hermine Sterler
- Aribert Wäscher
- Erich Kaiser-Titz
- Karl Platen
- Heinrich Schroth
- Hugo Flink
- Kurt Vespermann
- Hans Junkermann
- Julia Serda
- Hermann Picha
- Georg Baselt
- Hilde Schewior
- Hubert von Meyerinck
- Didier Aslan
- Albert Paulig
- Luise Werckmeister
- Maria Forescu
- Zehra Achmed

== Bibliography ==
- Prinzler, Hans Helmut (1995). Chronik des deutschen Films. Stuttgart: J. B. Metzler. ISBN 978-3-476-01290-6.
