= Hermine Sterler =

German-American actress (1894–1982)

- Born: Minna Stern; 20 March 1894; Stuttgart, German Empire
- Died: 25 May 1982 (aged 88); Stuttgart, West Germany
- Occupation: Actress
- Years active: 1921–1966

Minna Stern (20 March 1894 – 25 May 1982), known professionally as Hermine Sterler, was a German-American actress whose career spanned both the silent and the talkie film eras on two continents.

== Career ==
Hermine Sterler was born with the name Minna Stern on 20 March 1894. Sterler, who appeared in several Hollywood films, was once affiliated with the Burgtheater in Vienna.

She debuted in 1918 at the Residenztheater Hannover and later performed in Berlin, where she appeared at the Kleinen Theater ("Little Theater"). She played a saloon lady and, from 1921, often appeared in German silent film. She flourished as a character actor in roles of young wives and mothers. In 1930, she appeared as Tsarina Alexandra Feodorovna in Rasputin, Demon with Women.

In 1933, a German government decree was enacted by Joseph Goebbels under the auspices of a newly created agency called Die Reichskulturkammer. The decree stipulated that Jewish actors were, among other things, prohibited from performing on German stage.

Sterler, who was a Jew, relocated to Vienna in 1933, where she continued to work in theater and cinema. The Anschluss of Austria ended her artistic career there. Sterler next moved to London. In 1938, she immigrated to the United States from Zurich under her birth name Minna Stern. Film director Wilhelm Dieterle gave Sterler her first role in American cinema.

During World War II and after, Sterler played mostly small roles in Hollywood productions portraying German or other European women. In the 1944 anti-Nazi film The Hitler Gang, she played the wife of Ernst Hanfstaengl.

On November 10, 1944, Sterler became a United States naturalized citizen in the U.S. District Court for the Central District of California at Los Angeles.

She gave actress Piper Laurie private acting lessons when Laurie was a child.

== Death ==
Hermine Sterler died on 25 May 1982, aged 88, in her native Stuttgart.

== Selected filmography ==
Silent film

- Die Hexe (1921)
- Hannele's Journey to Heaven (1922) - Frau Berger
- Lumpaci the Vagabond (1922)
- The Five Frankfurters (1922) - Gräfin Stadion
- The Love Nest (1922)
- Der Mann mit der eisernen Maske (1923)
- Paganini (1923) - The Duchess
- People in Need (1925) - Elisabeth Ditten, Gutsbesitzerin
- The Hanseatics (1925)
- People to Each Other (1926) - Oberin des Gefängnisses
- Children of No Importance (1926) - Frau Berndt
- Orphan of Lowood (1926) - Lehrerin
- Wie bleibe ich jung und schön - Ehegeheimnisse (1926)
- German Women - German Faithfulness (1927) - Regine Vollrath
- Prinz Louis Ferdinand (1927) - Rahel Lewis
- Potsdam (1927)
- Regine (1927) - Die Hausdame
- Das Schicksal einer Nacht (1927)
- Dame Care (1928) - Seine Frau
- Endangered Girls (1928)
- The Lady from Argentina (1928)
- The Sinner (1928) - Odettes Mutter
- Mädchenschicksale (1928) - Irinas Mutter
- Der Ladenprinz (1928) - Rosanna
- Strauss: The Waltz King (1928) - Anna, seine Frau
- The Republic of Flappers (1928) - Fräulein Helmers
- Adam and Eve (1928) - Frau Konsul Jensen
- The Blue Mouse (1928) - Frau Lebodier
- The Hero of Every Girl's Dream (1929) - Madame Turbon
- The Girl from the Provinces (1929) - Magda Ronacher
- The Right to Love (1930) - Frau Gebhard - eine Offizierswitwe

Talkies

- Les saltimbanques (1930) - Stella Daniela
- Die Somme: Das Grab der Millionen (1930)
- Zärtlichkeit (1930) - Frl. Lorrmann - Haushälterin
- The Other (1930) - Hallers Schwester
- Marriage in Name Only (1930) - Hanna v. Späth, Schwester Veltens
- Two People (1930) - Gräfin Enna
- Mary (1931) - Miß Miller
- I Go Out and You Stay Here (1931) - Stephanie Derlett, Inhaberin eines Modesalons
- The Theft of the Mona Lisa (1931)
- 24 Hours in the Life of a Woman (1931) - Erika
- Rasputin, Demon with Women (1932) - Zarin
- Hasenklein kann nichts dafür (1932) - Geheimrätin von Schendell
- Eine von uns (1932)
- Mieter Schulze gegen alle (1932)
- The First Right of the Child (1932)
- Adventures on the Lido (1933) - Lucena
- Voices of Spring (1933)
- Unfinished Symphony (1934) - Princess Kinsky
- Everything for the Company (1935) - Ella Sonndorfer
- Little Mother (1935) - Leontine
- Te quiero con locura (1935) - Leontine
- Scandal Sheet (1939) - Mrs. Kopal
- My Son Is Guilty (1939) - Barney's Mother (uncredited)
- Dr. Ehrlich's Magic Bullet (1940) - Miss Marquardt
- Jennie (1940) - Mother Schermer
- So Ends Our Night (1941) - Berlin Nurse (uncredited)
- Shining Victory (1941) - Miss Hoffman
- Nazi Agent (1942) - Mrs. Mohr (uncredited)
- Kings Row (1942) - Secretary (uncredited)
- Secret Agent of Japan (1942) - Mrs. Alecsandri
- Reunion in France (1942) - Woman (uncredited)
- Bomber's Moon (1943) - Greta - Maid (uncredited)
- Hostages (1943) - Gestapo Agent (uncredited)
- Women in Bondage (1943) - German Mother (uncredited)
- The Hitler Gang (1944) - Frau Hanfstaengel (uncredited)
- They Live in Fear (1944) - Frau Stoesen (uncredited)
- Betrayal from the East (1945) - Keller (uncredited)
- The Falcon in San Francisco (1945) - Ms. Carla Keyes (uncredited)
- Renegades (1946) - Mrs. Jackorski (uncredited)
- The Razor's Edge (1946) - Nurse (uncredited)
- Golden Earrings (1947) - Greta Krosigk
- Railroaded! (1947) - Mrs. Ryan
- Letter from an Unknown Woman (1948) - Mother Superior (uncredited)
- Berlin Express (1948) - Frau Borne (uncredited)
- The Dark Past (1948) - Mrs. Linder (uncredited)
- The Mating Season (1951) - German Woman (uncredited)
- The Congregation (1952)
- How to Marry a Millionaire (1953) - Madame (uncredited)
- There's Always Tomorrow (1955) - Tourist's Wife
- My Father, the Actor (1956) - Frl. Dr. Mahlke
- Kelly and Me (1956) - Hilda (uncredited)
- Torn Curtain (1966) - Old Woman Entering at Bus Stop (uncredited) (final film role)

== Family ==
Sterler (née Minna Stern) was born 20 March 1894 in Bad Cannstatt, Stuttgart, to Max Stern (born 1853) and Bertha Wormser (née Bertha Emilia Wormser; 1865–1936), both of whom married each other on 5 July 1888.

== See also ==
- The Continental Players, a theater workshop of immigrants, of which she was a member
