= The Girl at the Reception =

1940 film

- German film poster
- German: Mädchen im Vorzimmer
- Directed by: Gerhard Lamprecht
- Written by: Franz Baumann; Walter von Hollander
- Starring: Magda Schneider; Heinz Engelmann; Carsta Löck
- Cinematography: Karl Hasselmann
- Edited by: Alexandra Anatra
- Music by: Kurt Schröder
- Production company: UFA
- Distributed by: UFA
- Release date: 31 May 1940
- Running time: 92 minutes
- Country: Germany
- Language: German

The Girl at the Reception (German: Mädchen im Vorzimmer) is a 1940 German drama film directed by Gerhard Lamprecht and starring Magda Schneider, Heinz Engelmann, and Carsta Löck. The film's sets were designed by the art directors Hermann Asmus and Anton Weber.

== Plot ==
An office worker employed at a publishing house is upset when her former lover is appointed as the new director.

== Cast ==
- Magda Schneider as Beate
- Heinz Engelmann as Paul Fabri
- Richard Häussler as Dr. Groner
- Carsta Löck as Millie Mailat, secretary
- Hans Leibelt as Karl Hartmann
- Edith Oß as Helga
- Rudolf Platte as Fritz Gödicke
- Paul Bildt as Prof. Groner
- Franz Stein as Grimm, editor in chief
- Willi Rose as Karl Mailat
- Ilse Petri as Sekretärin Susi Schütz
- Annemarie Korff as photographer Frl. Fein
- Gerhard Dammann as Botenmeister Stallmann
- Karl Hannemann as Grenzke, editor in chief
- Erich Fiedler as Weinreich, editor in chief
- Rose Feldkirch as Lore Hartmann
- Arthur Schröder as Lawyer Clever
- Ernst Karchow as Dr. Ziervogel, editor in chief
- Walter Ladengast as Trall, editor in chief
- Leonore Ehn as Willmerding's mother
- Charly Berger
- Erwin Biegel
- Günther Brackmann
- Robert Forsch
- Karl Heidmann
- Alfred Karen
- Trude Lehmann
- Elisabeth Lennartz
- Richard Ludwig
- Manfred Meurer
- Edgar Nollet
- Klaus Pohl
- Claire Reigbert
- Oscar Sabo
- Walter Steinweg
- Werner Stock
- Toni Tetzlaff
- Tommy Thomas
- Eva Tinschmann
- Ewald Wenck
- Willi Witte
- Martha Ziegler

== Bibliography ==
- Kreimeier, Klaus (1999). The Ufa Story: A History of Germany's Greatest Film Company, 1918–1945. Berkeley, CA: University of California Press. ISBN 0520220692.
