= The Song of the Puszta =

1920 film directed by Carl Boese

- German: Das Lied der Puszta
- Directed by: Carl Boese
- Written by: Karl Figdor
- Produced by: Isidor Fett; Karl Wiesel
- Starring: Grete Hollmann; Ludwig Rex; Karl Falkenberg
- Production companies: Bayerische Filmgesellschaft Fett & Wiesel
- Release date: January 1920
- Country: Germany
- Languages: Silent; German intertitles

The Song of the Puszta (German: Das Lied der Puszta) is a 1920 German silent film directed by Carl Boese and starring Grete Hollmann and Ludwig Rex and Karl Falkenberg.

== Cast ==
- Charlotte Böcklin
- Grete Hollmann
- Ludwig Rex
- Karl Falkenberg
- Friedrich Kühne
