= Garragan =

1924 film

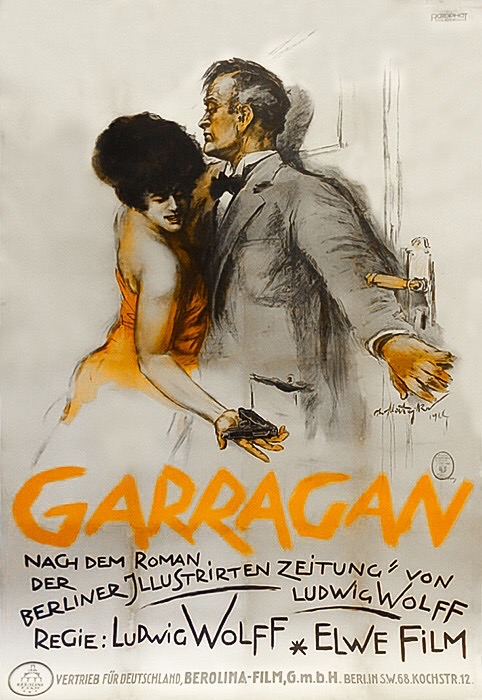
- Directed by: Ludwig Wolff
- Written by: Ludwig Wolff
- Produced by: Ludwig Wolff
- Starring: Edward Burns; Carmel Myers; Julanne Johnston
- Cinematography: Karl Hasselmann; Reimar Kuntze; Guido Seeber
- Production company: Elwe-Film
- Distributed by: Berolina Film
- Release date: 20 October 1924
- Country: Germany
- Languages: Silent; German intertitles

Garragan is a 1924 German silent film directed by Ludwig Wolff and starring Edward Burns, Carmel Myers and Julanne Johnston.

The film's sets were designed by the art director Heinrich Beisenherz.

== Cast ==
- Edward Burns
- Carmel Myers
- Julanne Johnston
- Owen Gorin
- Kurt von Lessen
- Adolf Bassermann
- Karl Platen
- Eduard von Winterstein
- Eduard Rothauser
- Max Maximilian
- Heinrich Peer
- Fritz Russ
- Hans Wassmann

== Bibliography ==
- Bock, Hans-Michael & Bergfelder, Tim. The Concise CineGraph. Encyclopedia of German Cinema. Berghahn Books, 2009.
