= Death Drive for the World Record =

1929 film

- Directed by: Kurt Blachy
- Written by: Fanny Reichwald
- Starring: Hermann Stetza; Claire Rommer; Valerie Boothby
- Cinematography: Bernhard Hellmund; Gustave Preiss
- Production company: Eisbär-Film
- Distributed by: Eisbär-Film
- Release date: 16 September 1929
- Country: Germany
- Languages: Silent; German intertitles

Death Drive for the World Record (German: Die Todesfahrt im Weltrekord) is a 1929 German silent film directed by Kurt Blachy and starring Hermann Stetza, Claire Rommer and Valerie Boothby.

== Cast ==
- Hermann Stetza as Salto King, der kreisende Komet
- Claire Rommer as Evelyn Hall
- Valerie Boothby as Ellen Montis
- Carl Auen as Graf Thierry
- Bernhard Goetzke as Kommissar Wolter
- Gerhard Dammann as Der Zirkusdirektor
- Louis Brody as Salto King's Faktotum
- Greif as Der Polizeihund

== Bibliography ==
- Bock, Hans-Michael & Bergfelder, Tim. The Concise Cinegraph: Encyclopaedia of German Cinema. Berghahn Books, 2009.
