= The Iron Bride =

1925 film directed by Carl Boese

- Directed by: Carl Boese
- Written by: Marie Luise Droop
- Produced by: Franz Vogel
- Starring: Otto Gebühr; Claire Rommer; Maly Delschaft
- Cinematography: Karl Hasselmann
- Production company: Eiko Film
- Distributed by: National Film
- Release date: 1 December 1925
- Country: Germany
- Languages: Silent; German intertitles

The Iron Bride (German: Die eiserne Braut) is a 1925 German silent film directed by Carl Boese and starring Otto Gebühr, Claire Rommer and Maly Delschaft.

The film's sets were designed by the art director Karl Machus.

== Cast ==
- Otto Gebühr
- Claire Rommer
- Maly Delschaft
- Owen Gorin
- Erna Morena
- Werner Pittschau
- Ernst Dernburg
- Otto Reinwald
- Carl Zickner
- Senta Eichstaedt
- Leopold von Ledebur
- Clementine Plessner

== Bibliography ==
- Bock, Hans-Michael & Bergfelder, Tim. The Concise CineGraph. Encyclopedia of German Cinema. Berghahn Books, 2009.
