= Children of the Street =

1929 film directed by Carl Boese

- Directed by: Carl Boese
- Written by: Heinz Goldberg; Hans Rehfisch (play)
- Starring: Lissy Arna; Heinrich George; Rudolf Biebrach
- Cinematography: Karl Hasselmann
- Music by: Hansheinrich Dransmann
- Production company: Carl Boese-Film
- Distributed by: National Film
- Release date: February 1929
- Running time: 89 minutes
- Country: Germany
- Languages: Silent; German intertitles

Children of the Street (German: Kinder der Straße) is a 1929 German silent drama film directed by Carl Boese and starring Lissy Arna, Heinrich George and Rudolf Biebrach.

The film's art direction was by Karl Machus.

== Cast ==
In alphabetical order

- Lissy Arna
- Hannelore Benzinger
- Rudolf Biebrach
- Gerhard Dammann
- Karl Falkenberg
- Lilly Flohr
- Heinrich George
- Erika Glässner
- John Mylong
- Martha Seemann
- Sylvia Torf
- Maria West

== Bibliography ==
- James Robert Parish & Kingsley Canham. Film Directors Guide: Western Europe. Scarecrow Press, 1976.
