= The Hanseatics =

1925 film

- Directed by: Gerhard Lamprecht
- Written by: Luise Heilborn-Körbitz; Rudolf Herzog (novel); Gerhard Lamprecht
- Starring: Tamara Karsavina; Fritz Alberti; Hermine Sterler
- Cinematography: Károly Vass
- Music by: Hansheinrich Dransmann
- Production company: National Film
- Distributed by: National Film
- Release date: 25 December 1925
- Country: Germany
- Languages: Silent; German intertitles

The Hanseatics (German: Hanseaten) is a 1925 German silent film directed by Gerhard Lamprecht and starring Tamara Karsavina, Fritz Alberti and Hermine Sterler.

The film's sets were designed by the art director Otto Moldenhauer.

== Cast ==
- Tamara Karsavina
- Fritz Alberti
- Hermine Sterler
- Aribert Wäscher
- Eduard Rothauser
- Frida Richard
- Renate Brausewetter
- Werner Pittschau
- Andreas Bull
- Rudolf Lettinger
- Paul Bildt
- Gustav Rodegg
- Georg John
- Maria Forescu
- Hans Merkwitz

== Bibliography ==
- Grange, William. Cultural Chronicle of the Weimar Republic. Scarecrow Press, 2008.
