= The Terror of the Red Mill =

1921 film directed by Carl Boese

- Directed by: Carl Boese
- Written by: Friedel Köhne
- Starring: Aud Egede-Nissen; Otto Gebühr; Alfred Abel
- Cinematography: Hans Karl Gottschalk
- Production companies: Bayerische Film-Gesellschaft Fett & Wiesel
- Release date: 30 September 1921
- Country: Germany
- Languages: Silent; German intertitles

The Terror of the Red Mill (German: Der Schrecken der roten Mühle) is a 1921 German silent film directed by Carl Boese and starring Aud Egede-Nissen, Otto Gebühr, and Alfred Abel.

== Cast ==
- Aud Egede-Nissen as Ossy Perkins
- Otto Gebühr as Oskar Linston
- Karl Falkenberg as Mariot
- Alfred Abel
- Grete Hollmann as Maud
- Friedrich Kühne as Scribble
- Helga Molander
- Aleksandar Ostojic
- Albert Patry as Oberingenieur Evans
- Ludwig Rex as Direktor Brighton

== Bibliography ==
- Bock, Hans-Michael; Bergfelder, Tim, eds. (2009). The Concise Cinegraph: Encyclopaedia of German Cinema. New York: Berghahn Books. ISBN 978-1-57181-655-9.
