= National Film =

German film company

National Film or National-Film was a German film production and distribution company which operated during the silent and early sound era. In the early 1920s it made an attempt to take over Erich Pommer's Decla-Bioscop, but the projected merger failed and Decla instead joined with the major studio UFA. While Decla was generally in favour of joining with National, it was pressured by its creditors Deutsche Bank to merge with UFA.

National established a link with the Hollywood studio Warner Brothers, distributing the American company's films in the German market. The company continued to operate during the decade, but the arrival of sound film in 1929 strained its resources due to the increased costs of making films with sound. By this stage the German film industry had become increasingly dominated by the four biggest companies UFA, Terra Film, Tobis Film and Bavaria Film. Many medium-sized studios were either driven out of business or amalgamated.

== Selected filmography ==
- Lady Hamilton (1921)
- Lotte Lore (1921)
- The Railway King (1921)
- You Are the Life (1921)
- The Story of a Maid (1921)
- The Earl of Essex (1922)
- Peter the Great (1922)
- Miss Julie (1922)
- Battle of the Butterflies (1924)
- Set Me Free (1924)
- The Hobgoblin (1924)
- The Girl from Capri (1924)
- Maud Rockefeller's Bet (1924)
- Za La Mort (1924)
- The Secret Agent (1924)
- The Assmanns (1925)
- An Artist of Life (1925)
- The Iron Bride (1925)
- Slums of Berlin (1925)
- The Hanseatics (1925)
- The Proud Silence (1925)
- Hedda Gabler (1925)
- Lena Warnstetten (1925)
- Children of No Importance (1926)
- Kubinke the Barber (1926)
- The Queen of the Baths (1926)
- People to Each Other (1926)
- The Wiskottens (1926)
- Lace (1926)
- Die vom anderen Ufer (1926)
- Battle of the Sexes (1926)
- Eternal Allegiance (1926)
- Aftermath (1927)
- Babette Bomberling (1927)
- Regine (1927)
- The Sporck Battalion (1927)
- The Holy Lie (1927)
- The Catwalk (1927)
- The Eleven Devils (1927)
- The Cavalier from Wedding (1927)
- Chance the Idol (1927)
- The Mistress of the Governor (1927)
- Mary Stuart (1927)
- Sister Veronika (1927)
- The Woman with the World Record (1927)
- Mata Hari (1927)
- Tough Guys, Easy Girls (1927)
- Under the Lantern (1928)
- When the Mother and the Daughter (1928)
- Eva in Silk (1928)
- Love's Masquerade (1928)
- The Page Boy at the Golden Lion (1928)
- The Old Fritz (1928)
- The Strange Night of Helga Wangen (1928)
- The Story of a Little Parisian (1928)
- The Sinner (1928)
- Sir or Madam (1928)
- Scampolo (1928)
- Anastasia, the False Czar's Daughter (1928)
- Lemke's Widow (1928)
- The Man with the Frog (1929)
- Three Around Edith (1929)
- Children of the Street (1929)
- Painted Youth (1929)
- My Sister and I (1929)
- Flachsmann the Educator (1930)
- Police Spy 77 (1930)
- You'll Be in My Heart (1930)
- Different Morals (1931)

== Bibliography ==
- Hardt, Urusula. From Caligari to California: Erich Pommer's Life in the International Film Wars. Berghahn Books, 1996.
- Kreimeier, Klaus. The Ufa story: a history of Germany's greatest film company, 1918–1945. University of California Press, 1999.
