= Zaida, the Tragedy of a Model =

1923 film

- Directed by: Holger-Madsen
- Written by: Luise Heilborn-Körbitz
- Starring: Gertrude Welcker; Alf Blütecher; Alexander Murski
- Cinematography: Sophus Wangøe
- Production company: Eiko Film
- Release date: 8 October 1923
- Country: Germany
- Languages: Silent; German intertitles

Zaida, the Tragedy of a Model (German: Zaida, die Tragödie eines Modells) is a 1923 German silent film directed by Holger-Madsen and starring Gertrude Welcker, Alf Blütecher and Alexander Murski.

The film's sets were designed by the art director Jack Winter.

== Cast ==
- Gertrude Welcker as Mrs. Sonja Crosshaven
- Olga Belajeff as Violet Lovelace
- Alf Blütecher as Wilfred Bruce - artist
- Alexander Murski as John Crosshaven - solicitor
- Heinrich Peer
