= Escape (1928 film) =

1928 film directed by Carl Froelich

- Directed by: Carl Froelich
- Written by: Friedrich Raff; Walter Supper
- Produced by: Wilhelm von Kaufmann
- Starring: Henny Porten; Max Maximilian; Margarete Kupfer
- Cinematography: Gustave Preiss
- Production company: Henny Porten-Froelich-Produktion
- Distributed by: UFA
- Release date: 31 August 1928
- Running time: 130 minutes
- Country: Germany
- Languages: Silent; German intertitles

Escape or Refuge (German: Zuflucht) is a 1928 German silent drama film directed by Carl Froelich and starring Henny Porten, Max Maximilian and Margarete Kupfer.

== Cast ==
- Henny Porten as Hanne Lorek
- Max Maximilian as Der alte Schurich
- Margarete Kupfer as seine Frau
- Alice Hechy as Guste, beider Tochter
- Francis Lederer as Martin
- Carl de Vogt as Kölling, Fleischergehilfe
- Mathilde Sussin as Frau Falkhagen
- Bodo Bronsky as Otto Falkhagen
- Helmuth Neumann as Fritz, beider Sohn
- Marion Mirimanian as Else, beider Tochter
- Lotte Stein as Marie Jankowsky
- Rudolf Biebrach as Hausarzt

== Bibliography ==
- Grange, William. Cultural Chronicle of the Weimar Republic. Scarecrow Press, 2008.
