= Under the Lantern =

1928 film

- scene from film
- Directed by: Gerhard Lamprecht
- Written by: Luise Heilborn-Körbitz; Gerhard Lamprecht
- Starring: Lissy Arna; Gerhard Dammann; Mathias Wieman; Hubert von Meyerinck
- Cinematography: Karl Hasselmann
- Music by: Hansheinrich Dransmann
- Production company: Gerhard Lamprecht Filmproduktion
- Distributed by: National Film
- Release date: 4 September 1928
- Running time: 70 minutes
- Country: Germany
- Languages: Silent; German intertitles

Under the Lantern (German: Unter der Laterne) is a 1928 German silent drama film directed by Gerhard Lamprecht and starring Lissy Arna, Gerhard Dammann and Mathias Wieman. The film's sets were designed by the art director Otto Moldenhauer.

== Preservation status ==
On 31 May 2014, the San Francisco Silent Film Festival presented a newly restored 35mm print from the Deutsche Kinemathek.

== Cast ==
- Lissy Arna as Else Riedel
- Gerhard Dammann as Ihr Vater
- Mathias Wieman as Hans Grote
- Paul Heidemann as Max Thiele
- Hubert von Meyerinck as Nevin
- Carla Bartheel as Zora
- Max Maximilian as Louis
- Käthe Haack as Die Frau
- Hilde Schewior as Frieda
- Sybill Morel as Die Alte
- Karl Hannemann as Der Tanzmeister
- Georg Paeschke as Der 'Anreißer'
- Maria Peterson as Die 'letzte Frau'
- Eva Speyer as Straßenmädchen
- Lili Schoenborn-Anspach as Straßenmädchen
- Anna von Palen as Die Blinde
- Fee Wachsmuth as Das Kind
- Franz Ernst Bochum as Nevins Bürovorsteher
- Leon Weill as Ein Betrunkener
- Alexandra Schmitt
- Walter Ladengast
- Nico Turoff
- Hilde Schwewior

== Bibliography ==
- Barnstone, Deborah Ascher & Haakenson, Thomas O. Modernist Aesthetics in Transition: Visual Culture of the Weimar Republic and Nazi Germany. Bloomsbury Academic, 2005.
- Caneppele, Paolo & Krenn, Günter. Elektrische Schatten. Filmarchiv Austria, 1999.
