= Different Morals =

1931 film

- Directed by: Gerhard Lamprecht
- Written by: Bruno Frank (play Perlenkomödie); Gerhard Lamprecht
- Starring: Walter Rilla; Aribert Wäscher; Elga Brink
- Cinematography: Karl Hasselmann; Albert Schattmann
- Edited by: Erich R. Schwab
- Music by: Giuseppe Becce
- Production company: Tobis Film
- Distributed by: National Film
- Release date: 5 January 1931
- Running time: 86 minutes
- Country: Germany
- Language: German

Different Morals (German: Zweierlei Moral) is a 1931 German comedy film directed by Gerhard Lamprecht, starring Walter Rilla, Aribert Wäscher, and Elga Brink. It was shot at the Tempelhof and Staaken Studios in Berlin. The film's sets were designed by the art director Otto Moldenhauer.

== Cast ==
- Walter Rilla as Norman
- Aribert Wäscher as Siethoff
- Elga Brink as Vera, seine Frau
- Hilde Hildebrand as Cora Petry
- Ida Wüst as Frau Hormeyer
- Rudolf Lettinger as Kommerzienrat Hormeyer
- Arthur Bergen as Gundermann, Detektiv
- Valy Arnheim as Egon, der Hausmeister
- John Mylong as Marx, Aushilfsdiener
- Johannes Bergfeldt as Otto, Normans Diener
- Gerhard Dammann as Der Klubdiener
- Bertold Reissig as Der Klavierstimmer
- Jenny Werner
- Gerti Ober
- Carla Gidt
- Maria Peterson
- Bernd Lürgen
- Eva Zimmermann
- Adelberg Ludwigshausen

== Bibliography ==
- Krautz, Alfred (1984). International Directory of Cinematographers, Set- and Costume Designers in Film. Vol. 4. Munich: Saur. ISBN 978-3-598-21434-9.
- Bock, Hans-Michael; Bergfelder, Tim, eds. (2009). The Concise Cinegraph: Encyclopaedia of German Cinema. New York: Berghahn Books. ISBN 978-1-57181-655-9.
