= The Sporck Battalion (1927 film) =

1927 film directed by Holger-Madsen

- Directed by: Holger-Madsen
- Written by: Richard Skowronnek (novel); Bobby E. Lüthge; Carl Boese
- Produced by: Carl Boese
- Starring: Otto Gebühr; Walter Rilla; Grete Mosheim
- Cinematography: Leopold Kutzleb; Arpad Viragh
- Production company: Carl Boese-Film
- Distributed by: National Film
- Release date: 10 January 1927
- Running time: 83 minutes
- Country: Germany
- Languages: Silent; German intertitles

The Sporck Battalion (German: Die Sporck'schen Jäger) is a 1927 German silent war film directed by Holger-Madsen and starring Otto Gebühr, Walter Rilla and Grete Mosheim. Hans Albers is sometimes added in some cast lists, but his performance is unconfirmed. It was shot at the Weissensee Studios in Berlin. The film's sets were designed by the art director Max Knaake. It was remade as a sound film of the same title in 1934.

== Cast ==
- Otto Gebühr as Hauptmann Rabenhainer
- Walter Rilla as Leutnant von Naugard
- Albert Steinrück as Forstmeister von Rüdiger
- Grete Mosheim as Elisabeth, seine Tochter
- Anton Pointner as Oberleutnant von Valenberg
- Hedwig Wangel as Witwe Retelsdorf
- Elizza La Porta as Mike - ihre Tochter
- Fritz Alberti as Oberstleutnant Brinkmann
- Elsa Wagner as Trine - Wirtschafterin bei v. Rüdiger
- Max Maximilian as Jochen - Forstgehilfe

== Bibliography ==
- Bock, Hans-Michael & Bergfelder, Tim. The Concise CineGraph. Encyclopedia of German Cinema. Berghahn Books, 2009.
