= Max Maximilian =

German actor

Max Maximilian (born Franz Kuhn; 23 September 1885 – 25 June 1930) was a German singer, actor and director.

== Career ==
Maximilian was born in Cologne and began his career as a singer and stage actor. He made his stage debut on 20 October 1905 at the Stadttheater Passau performing in operettas. In 1906 he moved to the Studienhaus in Coburg, in 1907 to Pirmasens, in 1908 to the Meininger Residenztheater, and in 1909 as an operetta singer at the Bochum City Theater. In 1910 he followed a call to Speyer, and 1911 to Wittenberge, where he was also allowed to stage plays as a director, and in 1912 to Munich, where he stayed until 1914 and also proved himself as a director and actor.

In the last few years before the outbreak of World War I, Max Maximilian turned to the new medium of film. There he covered the entire range of supporting roles: he played fathers and subordinate service providers, seamen and miners, shady characters and police gendarmes. In the 1920s Maximilian occasionally worked as an assistant director (e.g. in 1922 for the film Der Absturz) or as a production manager (e.g. in 1924 for Garragan and 1926 for Der Student von Prag).

Maximilian died in Berlin in 1930, aged 44.

== Selected filmography ==
- Rose Bernd (1919)
- Monika Vogelsang (1920)
- Garragan (1924)
- Slums of Berlin (1925)
- The Student of Prague (1926)
- Children of No Importance (1926)
- People to Each Other (1926)
- The Poacher (1926)
- The Sporck Battalion (1927)
- The Long Intermission (1927)
- Aftermath (1927)
- The Catwalk (1927)
- Orient Express (1927)
- Mata Hari (1927)
- That Was Heidelberg on Summer Nights (1927)
- Luther (1928)
- Modern Pirates (1928)
- Cry for Help (1928)
- Violantha (1928)
- Volga Volga (1928)
- Pawns of Passion (1928)
- Eddy Polo in the Wasp's Nest (1928)
- Lemke's Widow (1928)
- Guilty (1928)
- The Beaver Coat (1928)
- Under the Lantern (1928)
- Escape (1928)
- Docks of Hamburg (1928)
- Mary Lou (1928)
- Sajenko the Soviet (1928)
- Eva in Silk (1928)
- The Veil Dancer (1929)
- Archduke John (1929)
- Dawn (1929)
- Youth of the Big City (1929)
- The Hero of Every Girl's Dream (1929)
- Woman in the Moon (1929)
- Painted Youth (1929)
- The League of Three (1929)
- What a Woman Dreams of in Springtime (1929)
- The Ship of Lost Souls (1929)
- Roses Bloom on the Moorland (1929)
- Witnesses Wanted (1930)
- The Tiger Murder Case (1930)

== Bibliography ==
- Waldman, Harry. Maurice Tourneur: The Life and Films. McFarland, 2001.
