= Luise Heilborn-Körbitz =

German screenwriter

- Born: 25 July 1874; Berlin, German Empire
- Died: 15 January 1961 (aged 86); West Berlin, West Germany
- Occupation: Writer
- Years active: 1912–1929 (film)

Luise Heilborn-Körbitz (25 July 1874 – 15 January 1961) was a German screenwriter. Active during the silent era, she often worked on the director Gerhard Lamprecht's films.

== Selected filmography ==
- The Graveyard of the Living (1921)
- The Buddenbrooks (1923)
- The House Without Laughter (1923)
- Zaida, the Tragedy of a Model (1923)
- The Hanseatics (1925)
- Slums of Berlin (1925)
- The Company Worth Millions (1925)
- Children of No Importance (1926)
- Kubinke the Barber (1926)
- People to Each Other (1926)
- Sister Veronika (1927)
- Tough Guys, Easy Girls (1927)
- The Catwalk (1927)
- Under the Lantern (1928)
- Eva in Silk (1928)
- When the Mother and the Daughter (1928)
- The Old Fritz (1928)
- Sir or Madam (1928)
- The Man with the Frog (1929)

== Bibliography ==
- Hans-Michael Bock and Tim Bergfelder. The Concise Cinegraph: An Encyclopedia of German Cinema. Berghahn Books, 2009.
