= Eva Speyer =

German actress

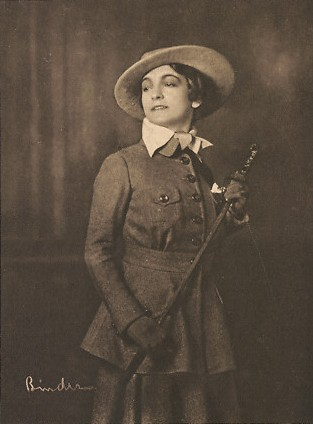
- Born: 24 August 1882; Berlin, German Empire
- Died: 13 August 1975 (aged 92); Mombasa, Kenya
- Other names: Eva Speyer-Stoeckel; Eva Ebert
- Occupation: Actress
- Years active: 1904–1932
- Spouses: Otto Stoeckel (m. 1907; div. 1911) Robert Ebert (m. 1918; died 1926)

Eva Speyer also known as Eva Speyer-Stoeckel and Eva Ebert (24 August 1882 – 13 August 1975) was a German actress. She appeared in more than seventy films from 1911 to 1932.

== Selected filmography ==
Year	Title	Role	Notes
1932	The White Demon		
1930	Marriage in Name Only		
1929	Madame Lu		
1929	The Age of Seventeen		
1929	The Right of the Unborn		
1929	Foolishness of His Love		
1929	Tragedy of Youth		
1929	Misled Youth		
1928	Under the Lantern		
1928	The Market of Life		
1928	Mary's Big Secret		
1928	The Strange Night of Helga Wangen		
1928	The Most Beautiful Woman in Paris		
1927	The Transformation of Dr. Bessel		
1927	I Was a Student at Heidelberg		
1927	Tragedy of the Street		
1927	Love Affairs		
1927	Paragraph 182		
1926	The Grey House		
1926	Kubinke the Barber		
1926	The Young Man from the Ragtrade		
1925	The Wife of Forty Years		
1920	The Gallant King		
1919	Die Arche		
1918	The Flight of Arno Jessen		
