= Hansheinrich Dransmann =

German composer

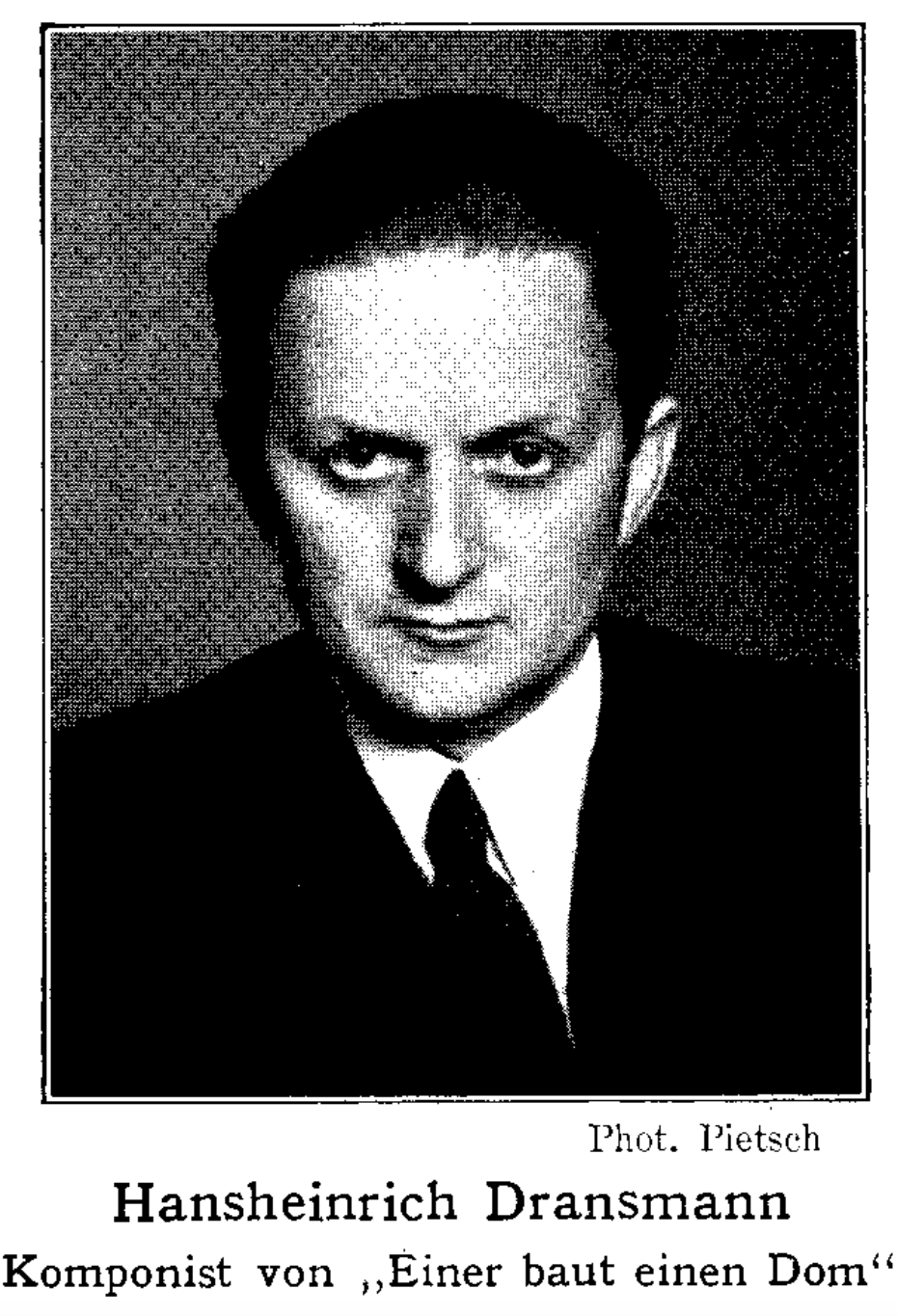
- Born: 12 April 1894; Hagen am Teutoburger Wald, German Empire
- Died: 25 November 1964 (aged 70)
- Occupation: Composer
- Years active: 1923–1940

Hansheinrich Dransmann (12 April 1894 – 25 November 1964) was a German composer, conductor, cultural functionary, and theater owner.

== Professional life ==
Dransmann studied with Franz Schreker and the Academy of Arts in Berlin. He was a pioneer of film music, working with avant-garde directions such as Walter Ruttmann. He joined the SA in 1931 and the NSDAP itself in 1932, and subsequently became a leading composer of mass propaganda works for the Third Reich after the Machtergreifung. After 1945, his work fell into obscurity, and there were no further public performances of his music.

== Selected filmography ==
- Jimmy: The Tale of a Girl and Her Bear (1923)
- Chamber Music (1925)
- Prem Sanyas (1925)
- The Hanseatics (1925)
- The Salesgirl from the Fashion Store (1925)
- Our Daily Bread (1926)
- Give My Regards to the Blonde Child on the Rhine (1926)
- Lord of the Night (1927)
- Excluded from the Public (1927)
- Thieves (1928)
- The Sinner (1928)
- The Story of a Little Parisian (1928)
- When the Mother and the Daughter (1928)
- The Women's War (1928)
- Anastasia, the False Czar's Daughter (1928)
- Under the Lantern (1928)
- A Better Master (1928)
- The Page Boy at the Golden Lion (1928)
- Eva in Silk (1928)
- Lemke's Widow (1928)
- Sir or Madam (1928)
- The Woman Everyone Loves Is You (1929)
- Ludwig II, King of Bavaria (1929)
- The Green Monocle (1929)
- German Wine (1929)
- Children of the Street (1929)
- Bobby, the Petrol Boy (1929)
- The Circus Princess (1929)
- The Three Kings (1929)
- Yes, Yes, Women Are My Weakness (1929)
- Waterloo (1929)
- Daughter of the Regiment (1929)

== Bibliography ==
- Rajadhyaksha, Ashish; Willemen, Paul, eds. (2014). Encyclopedia of Indian Cinema. Hoboken, NJ: Taylor & Francis. ISBN 978-1-135-94318-9.
- London, John, ed. (2001). Theatre under the Nazis (Nachdr. ed.). Manchester: Manchester Univ. Press. p. 171. ISBN 978-0-7190-5991-9.
