= Holger-Madsen =

Danish film director, actor and screenwriter (1878–1943)

- Born: 11 April 1878; Copenhagen, Denmark
- Died: 30 November 1943 (aged 65); Copenhagen, Denmark
- Occupations: Film director Actor; Screenwriter
- Years active: 1912–1936

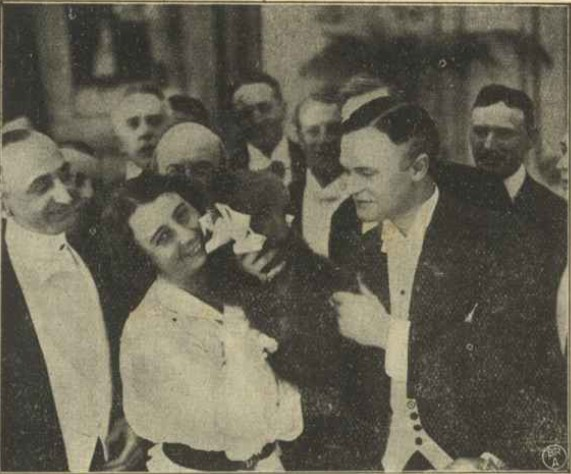
Trold kan tammes.JPG

Forest Holger-Madsen (11 April 1878 – 30 November 1943) was a Danish film director, actor and screenwriter. He directed more than 40 films between 1912 and 1936. He also appeared in more than 20 films between 1908 and 1935.

== Selected filmography ==
- Kun en Tigger (1912)
- Ned med Vaabnene (1913)
- Pax aeterna (1917)
- A Trip to Mars (1918)
- Towards the Light (1919)
- Judge Not (1920)
- Zaida, the Tragedy of a Model (1923)
- The Evangelist (1924)
- The Man at Midnight (1924)
- An Artist of Life (1925)
- Lace (1926)
- The Holy Lie (1927)
- The Sporck Battalion (1927)
- Fair Game (1928)
- The Strange Night of Helga Wangen (1928)
- What's Wrong with Nanette? (1929)
- Præsten i Vejlby (1931)
- København, Kalundborg og - ? (1934)
- Kidnapped (1935)
- Sun Over Denmark (1936)
