= Trude Lehmann =

German actress

- Born: 26 October 1892; Magdeburg, German Empire
- Died: 3 January 1987 (aged 94); West Berlin, West Germany
- Occupation: Actress
- Years active: 1926–1956 (film)

Trude Lehmann (October 26, 1892 – January 3, 1987) was a German film actress.

== Selected filmography ==
- Children of No Importance (1926)
- We'll Meet Again in the Heimat (1926)
- Unmarried Daughters (1926)
- Nanette Makes Everything (1926)
- The False Prince (1927)
- Miss Chauffeur (1928)
- The House Without Men (1928)
- Adam and Eve (1928)
- What a Woman Dreams of in Springtime (1929)
- Youth of the Big City (1929)
- Painted Youth (1929)
- The Lord of the Tax Office (1929)
- Dolly Gets Ahead (1930)
- That's All That Matters (1931)
- Shadows Over St. Pauli (1938)
- Shoulder Arms (1939)
- The Girl at the Reception (1940)

== Bibliography ==
- Grange, William. Cultural Chronicle of the Weimar Republic. Scarecrow Press, 2008.
