= Gerhard Dammann =

German actor (1883–1946)

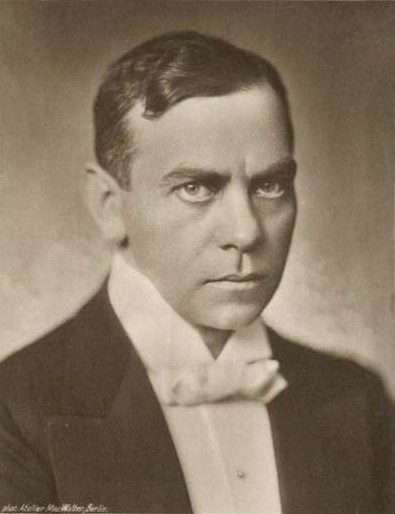
- Dammann, ca. 1920
- Born: 30 March 1883; Cologne, German Empire
- Died: 21 February 1946 (aged 62); Bad Ischl, Austria
- Occupations: Actor, director, producer, writer
- Years active: 1911–1945

Gerhard Dammann (30 March 1883 – 21 February 1946) was a German film actor.

== Selected filmography ==
- The Man in the Cellar (1914)
- Under the Lantern (1928)
- Eva in Silk (1928)
- Lemke's Widow (1928)
- When the Mother and the Daughter (1928)
- The Strange Night of Helga Wangen (1928)
- Death Drive for the World Record (1929)
- Children of the Street (1929)
- Two Brothers (1929)
- Woman in the Moon (1929)
- Roses Bloom on the Moorland (1929)
- Sin and Morality (1929)
- Giftgas (1929)
- Masks (1929)
- Painted Youth (1929)
- The Cabinet of Doctor Larifari (1930)
- Rag Ball (1930)
- A Thousand Words of German (1930)
- Helene Willfüer, Student of Chemistry (1930)
- Marriage Strike (1930)
- My Leopold (1931)
- The Secret of the Red Cat (1931)
- Grock (1931)
- Without Meyer, No Celebration is Complete (1931)
- Marriage with Limited Liability (1931)
- Different Morals (1931)
- Crime Reporter Holm (1932)
- Between Night and Dawn (1931)
- A Crafty Youth (1931)
- Bobby Gets Going (1931)
- Emil and the Detectives (1931)
- Spione im Savoy-Hotel (1932)
- The Escape to Nice (1932)
- The Importance of Being Earnest (1932)
- Gitta Discovers Her Heart (1932)
- The Heath Is Green (1932)
- Johnny Steals Europe (1932)
- Spies at the Savoy Hotel (1932)
- No Money Needed (1932)
- Secret Agent (1932)
- Secret of the Blue Room (1932)
- The Blue of Heaven (1932)
- Maid Happy (1933)
- Love Must Be Understood (1933)
- When the Village Music Plays on Sunday Nights (1933)
- Tell Me Who You Are (1933)
- The Big Bluff (1933)
- Three Bluejackets and a Blonde (1933)
- Elisabeth and the Fool (1934)
- Miss Liselott (1934)
- Black Fighter Johanna (1934)
- The Daring Swimmer (1934)
- The World Without a Mask (1934)
- Bashful Felix (1934)
- Don't Lose Heart, Suzanne! (1935)
- The King's Prisoner (1935)
- The Valley of Love (1935)
- Variety (1935)
- The Impossible Woman (1936)
- The Castle in Flanders (1936)
- Back in the Country (1936)
- Hilde and the Volkswagen (1936)
- The Accusing Song (1936)
- Orders Are Orders (1936)
- Paul and Pauline (1936)
- Autobus S (1937)
- An Enemy of the People (1937)
- Woman's Love—Woman's Suffering (1937)
- The Ways of Love Are Strange (1937)
- His Best Friend (1937)
- Love Can Lie (1937)
- Madame Bovary (1937)
- The Man Who Was Sherlock Holmes (1937)
- The Divine Jetta (1937)
- Storms in May (1938)
- Men, Animals and Sensations (1938)
- The Day After the Divorce (1938)
- The Impossible Mister Pitt (1938)
- The Holm Murder Case (1938)
- Monika (1938)
- Adventure in Love (1938)
- You and I (1938)
- The Tiger of Eschnapur (1938)
- The Indian Tomb (1938)
- Steputat & Co. (1938)
- Escape in the Dark (1939)
- In the Name of the People (1939)
- Bachelor's Paradise (1939)
- Marriage in Small Doses (1939)
- Robert and Bertram (1939)
- The Girl at the Reception (1940)
- A Man Astray (1940)
- Small Town Poet (1940)
- Twilight (1940)
- Clarissa (1941)
- Riding for Germany (1941)
- Mistress Moon (1941)
- Above All Else in the World (1941)
- Diesel (1942)
- His Son (1942)
- Front Theatre (1942)
- Two in a Big City (1942)
- Wedding in Barenhof (1942)
- Zirkus Renz (1943)
- My Summer Companion (1943)
- Melody of a Great City (1943)
- The Golden Spider (1943)
- A Beautiful Day (1944)
- The Green Salon (1944)
- That Was My Life (1944)

== Bibliography ==
- Abel, Richard. Encyclopedia of Early Cinema. Taylor & Francis, 2005.
