= Otto Moldenhauer =

German art director

- Born: 30 August 1882; Potsdam, German Empire
- Died: 27 April 1969 (aged 86); West Berlin, West Germany
- Occupation: Art director
- Years active: 1919–1944 (film)

Otto Moldenhauer (30 August 1882 – 27 April 1969) was a German art director. He worked frequently on the director Gerhard Lamprecht's films.

== Selected filmography ==
- Prince Cuckoo (1919)
- The Graveyard of the Living (1921)
- The Buddenbrooks (1923)
- And Yet Luck Came (1923)
- The Hanseatics (1925)
- People to Each Other (1926)
- Kubinke the Barber (1926)
- Sister Veronika (1927)
- The Catwalk (1927)
- The Old Fritz (1928)
- Under the Lantern (1928)
- The Strange Night of Helga Wangen (1928)
- Anastasia, the False Czar's Daughter (1928)
- The Man with the Frog (1929)
- Bobby, the Petrol Boy (1929)
- On the Reeperbahn at Half Past Midnight (1929)
- Different Morals (1931)
- Between Night and Dawn (1931)
- Ripening Youth (1933)
- The Two Seals (1934)
- His Late Excellency (1935)
- The Hour of Temptation (1936)
- A Strange Guest (1936)
- The Ways of Love Are Strange (1937)
- The Holm Murder Case (1938)
- Battle Squadron Lützow (1941)

== Bibliography ==
- Giesen, Rolf (2003). Nazi Propaganda Films: A History and Filmography. Jefferson, NC: McFarland. ISBN 978-0-7864-3870-9.
