= Karl Falkenberg =

German actor

- Born: Karl Franz Josef Falkenberg; 6 April 1887; German Empire
- Occupation: Actor
- Years active: 1916–1936
- Spouse: Helena Makowska (divorced)

Karl Falkenberg (born Karl Franz Josef Falkenberg, 6 April 1887 – died after 1936) was a German-Jewish film actor.

== Selected filmography ==
- Clown Charly (1918)
- Cain (1918)
- Blackmailed (1920)
- The Song of the Puszta (1920)
- The Grand Babylon Hotel (1920)
- Parisian Women (1921)
- The Terror of the Red Mill (1921)
- Evelyn's Love Adventures (1921)
- The Passenger in the Straitjacket (1922)
- The Testament of Joe Sivers (1922)
- Your Bad Reputation (1922)
- The Marriage Swindler (1922)
- The Unwritten Law (1922)
- His Wife, The Unknown (1923)
- Resurrection (1923)
- Maciste and Prisoner 51 (1923)
- Maciste and the Chinese Chest (1923)
- Bob and Mary (1923)
- The Tragedy of a Night of Passion (1924)
- The Heart of Lilian Thorland (1924)
- The Four Last Seconds of Quidam Uhl (1924)
- Slaves of Love (1924)
- Mrs Worrington's Perfume (1925)
- Unmarried Daughters (1926)
- Hunted People (1926)
- The Last Horse Carriage in Berlin (1926)
- Nixchen (1926)
- The Love of the Bajadere (1926)
- Eyes Open, Harry! (1926)
- Hunted People (1926)
- The Page Boy at the Golden Lion (1928)
- Children of the Street (1929)
- Big City Children (1929)
- Roses Bloom on the Moorland (1929)
- The Call of the North (1929)
- Morals at Midnight (1930)
- Of Life and Death (1930)
- Bashful Felix (1934)
- Hearts are Trumps (1934)
- The Red Rider (1935)
- A Strange Guest (1936)

== Bibliography ==
- Hardt, Ursula (1996). From Caligari to California: Erich Pommer's Life in the International Film Wars. Providence: Berghahn Books. ISBN 978-1-57181-930-7.
- Prawer, Siegbert Salomon (2007) [2005]. Between Two Worlds: The Jewish Presence in German and Austrian Film, 1910–1933. New York: Berghahn Books. ISBN 978-1-84545-303-9.
