= Carl Boese =

German film director (1887-1958)

- Born: Carl Eduard Hermann Boese; 26 August 1887; Berlin, German Empire
- Died: 6 July 1958 (aged 70); Charlottenburg, West Berlin, West Germany
- Occupations: Film director; Screenwriter
- Years active: 1917–1957

Carl Eduard Hermann Boese (German: [kaʁl ˈbøːzə]; 26 August 1887 – 6 July 1958) was a German film director, screenwriter, and producer. He directed 158 films between 1917 and 1957.

== Selected filmography ==
- Farmer Borchardt (1917)
- Donna Lucia (1918)
- The Stolen Sole (1918) - Director
- Nuri's Curse / Nissami's Song (1918) - Director
- The Geisha and the Samurai (1919)
- The Devil and the Madonna (1919)
- Nocturne of Love (1919)-Direct.
- The Golem: How He Came into the World (1920)
- The Dancer Barberina (1920)
- Three Nights (1920)
- The Song of the Puszta (1920)
- Blackmailed (1920)
- The Raft of the Dead (1921)
- The Shadow of Gaby Leed (1921)
- The Terror of the Red Mill (1921)
- Dolores (1922) - Director
- The Unwritten Law (1922)
- Slave for Life, director, producer
- Count Cohn (1923)
- Maciste and the Chinese Chest (1923)
- Slaves of Love (1924)
- War in Peace (1925)
- The Iron Bride (1925)
- Three Waiting Maids (1925)
- If You Have an Aunt (1925)
- The Marriage Swindler (1925)
- The Last Horse Carriage in Berlin (1926)
- The Man Without Sleep (1926)
- The Sea Cadet (1926)
- The Trumpets are Blowing (1926)
- Nanette Makes Everything (1926)
- Unmarried Daughters (1926)
- Give My Regards to the Blonde Child on the Rhine (1926)
- The Sporck Battalion (1927)
- The White Spider (1927)
- The Indiscreet Woman (1927)
- Sir or Madam (1928)
- Lemke's Widow (1928)
- When the Mother and the Daughter (1928)
- Eva in Silk (1928)
- The Page Boy at the Golden Lion (1928)
- Razzia (1929)
- Children of the Street (1929)
- Bobby, the Petrol Boy (1929)
- Painted Youth (1929)
- Alimente (1930)
- Marriage Strike (1930)
- Love Songs (1930) writer
- El amor solfeando (1930), writer
- The Kaiser's Detectives (1930)
- Rendezvous (1930)
- Three Days Confined to Barracks (1930)
- Without Meyer, No Celebration is Complete (1931)
- My Cousin from Warsaw (1931)
- Terror of the Garrison (1931)
- The Soaring Maiden (1931)
- Duty is Duty (1931)
- Grock (1931)
- The Unfaithful Eckehart (1931)
- No Money Needed (1932)
- You Will Be My Wife (1932)
- Theodor Körner (1932)
- The Cheeky Devil (1932)
- Paprika (1932)
- Paprika (1933)
- Homecoming to Happiness (1933)
- The Gentleman from Maxim's (1933)
- The Sandwich Girl (1933)
- A Woman Like You (1933)
- Gretel Wins First Prize (1933)
- Three Bluejackets and a Blonde (1933)
- Greetings and Kisses, Veronika (1933)
- The Lucky Diamond (1934)
- The Flower Girl from the Grand Hotel (1934)
- Miss Madame (1934)
- Bashful Felix (1934)
- Hearts are Trumps (1934)
- A Night on the Danube (1935)
- The King's Prisoner (1935)
- Back in the Country (1936)
- Adventure in Warsaw (1937)
- A Diplomatic Wife (1937)
- Five Million Look for an Heir (1938)
- Hello Janine! (1939)
- Three Fathers for Anna (1939)
- My Aunt, Your Aunt (1939)
- Everything for Gloria (1941)
- The Brambilla Family Go on Holiday (1941)
- Light of Heart (1943)
- Harald Arrives at Nine (1944)
- The Wedding Hotel (1944)
- When Men Cheat (1950)
- The Chaste Libertine (1952)
- The Bogeyman (1953)
- The Uncle from America (1953)
- Josef the Chaste (1953)
- The Spanish Fly (1955)
- My Aunt, Your Aunt (1956)
- Father Makes A Career (1957)
