= Karl Hasselmann =

German cinematographer (1883–1966)

- Born: 8 May 1883; Hanover, Lower Saxony; German Empire
- Died: 8 June 1966 (aged 83); West Berlin, West Germany
- Occupation: Cinematographer
- Years active: 1906–1952

Karl Hasselmann (8 May 1883 – 8 June 1966) was a German cinematographer who worked on over a hundred films during a long career. He collaborated with Ewald André Dupont on a number of productions for Gloria Film such as Whitechapel. He worked on eleven films with Karl Grune.

Hasselmann was born on 8 May 1883 in Hanover; he died at the age of 83 on 8 June 1966 in West Berlin.

== Selected filmography ==
- The White Roses of Ravensberg (1919)
- Alkohol (1919)
- Whitechapel (1920)
- Hearts are Trumps (1920)
- The White Peacock (1920)
- The Vulture Wally (1921)
- The Conspiracy in Genoa (1921)
- Murder Without Cause (1921)
- Man Overboard (1921)
- Night and No Morning (1921)
- The Hunt for the Truth (1921)
- Othello (1922)
- A Dying Nation (1922)
- The Earl of Essex (1922)
- The Street (1923)
- Arabella (1924)
- Garragan (1924)
- Op Hoop van Zegen (1924)
- Jealousy (1925)
- Slums of Berlin (1925)
- The Iron Bride (1925)
- Comedians (1925)
- The Brothers Schellenberg (1926)
- Children of No Importance (1926)
- People to Each Other (1926)
- Sister Veronika (1927)
- The Catwalk (1927)
- Sir or Madam (1928)
- Lemke's Widow (1928)
- Under the Lantern (1928)
- Eva in Silk (1928)
- Katharina Knie (1929)
- The Convict from Istanbul (1929)
- Painted Youth (1929)
- Children of the Street (1929)
- The Man with the Frog (1929)
- By a Nose (1931)
- Checkmate (1931)
- Between Night and Dawn (1931)
- Different Morals (1931)
- Trenck (1932)
- The Roberts Case (1933)
- When the Village Music Plays on Sunday Nights (1933)
- What Men Know (1933)
- The Legacy of Pretoria (1934)
- The Brenken Case (1934)
- The Cat in the Bag (1935)
- Inspector of the Red Cars (1935)
- The Hour of Temptation (1936)
- The Accusing Song (1936)
- Madame Bovary (1937)
- The Secret Lie (1938)
- Men, Animals and Sensations (1938)
- Woman in the River (1939)
- The Girl at the Reception (1940)
- Clarissa (1941)
- Voice of the Heart (1942)
- My Summer Companion (1943)
- Wild Bird (1943)
- Quartet of Five (1949)

== Bibliography ==
- Bock, Hans-Michael & Bergfelder, Tim. The Concise CineGraph. Encyclopedia of German Cinema. Berghahn Books, 2009.
