= List of German films of 1922 =

This is a list of the most notable films produced in the Cinema of Germany in 1922.

| Title | Director | Cast | Genre | Notes |
|---|---|---|---|---|
1922
| The Adventurer | Lothar Mendes | Michael Bohnen, Rudolf Forster, Olga Limburg | Silent | |
| Ali-Baba und die 40 Räuber | Leopold Blonder | | animation | |
| The Anthem of Love | Heinz Schall | Claire Rommer, Johannes Riemann, Ilka Grüning | Drama | |
| Aschenputtel | Lotte Reiniger | | animation | Based on traditional German variant of Cinderella |
| Barmaid | Johannes Guter | Xenia Desni, Paul Hartmann, Charlotte Ander | Silent | |
| The Battle of Skagerrak | Berthold Bartosch | | animation | |
| Bethel, Arbeiterkolonie Wilhelmsdorf | Gertrud David | | documentary | |
| Bethel, Bilder aus der Fürsorgeerziehung | Gertrud David | | documentary | |
| Bethel, Bilder aus der Liebesarbeit der Diakonissen von Sarpeta | Gertrud David | | documentary | |
| Bethel, ein Denkmal der Barmherzigkeit Gottes | Gertrud David | | documentary | |
| Bethel, der Werdegang eines Nazareth-Bruders | Gertrud David | | documentary | |
| The Big Shot | Georg Jacoby | Hugo Fischer-Köppe, Wilhelm Diegelmann, Hugo Döblin | Silent | |
| The Big Thief | Rudolf Walther-Fein | Colette Corder, Paul Hardtmuth | Silent | |
| Bigamy | Rudolf Walther-Fein | Alfred Abel, Margit Barnay, Reinhold Schünzel | Drama | |
| The Black Cover | Harry Piel | Harry Piel, Charly Berger | Thriller | |
| Black Monday | Robert A. Dietrich | Erich Kaiser-Titz, Hella Moja | Silent | |
| The Black Star | James Bauer | Hans Mierendorff, The Black Star | Silent | |
| The Burning Soil | Friedrich Wilhelm Murnau | Werner Krauss, Eugen Klöpfer | Drama | |
| The Call of Destiny | Johannes Guter | Xenia Desni, Fritz Kortner | Drama | |
| Chufu | Leopold Blonder | | animation | |
| The Cigarette Countess | Wolfgang Neff | Esther Carena, Carl Auen, Olga Limburg | Drama | |
| The Circle of Death | William Karfiol | Johannes Riemann, Olga Chekhova | Drama | |
| Circus People | William Kahn | Anita Berber, Charles Willy Kayser, Eduard von Winterstein | Drama | |
| Count Festenberg | Urban Gad, Frederic Zelnik | Charles Willy Kayser, Harald Paulsen | Silent | |
| The Count of Charolais | Karl Grune | Eva May, William Dieterle | Historical | |
| The Curse of Silence | Felix Basch | Hermann Thimig, Arnold Korff | Drama | |
| The Diadem of the Czarina | Richard Löwenbein | Eduard von Winterstein, Carl Auen | Historical | |
| Die deutschen Kampfspiele 1922 | | | documentary | |
| Don Juan | Albert Heine, Robert Land | Hans Adalbert Schlettow, Margarete Lanner, Margit Barnay | Silent | |
| Dr. Mabuse the Gambler | Fritz Lang | Rudolf Klein-Rogge, Aud Egede-Nissen, Gertrude Welcker | Crime | Released in two parts |
| Duke Ferrante's End | Rochus Gliese | Paul Wegener, Hans Sturm | Historical | |
| A Dying Nation | Robert Reinert | Paul Wegener, Otto Gebühr, Fritz Kortner | Historical | |
| The Earl of Essex | Peter Paul Felner | Eugen Klöpfer, Fritz Kortner, Eva May | Historical | |
| The Fall of Jerusalem | Eugen Illés | Theodor Becker, Jaro Fürth | Historical | |
| The False Dimitri | Hans Steinhoff | Alfred Abel, Agnes Straub | Historical | |
| The Favourite of the Queen | Franz Seitz | Erich Kaiser-Titz, Hanna Ralph | Historical | |
| The Fire Ship | Richard Löwenbein | Camilla von Hollay, Eduard von Winterstein, Viggo Larsen | Drama | |
| The Five Frankfurters | Erich Schönfelder | Frida Richard, Guido Herzfeld | Historical | |
| The Flight into Marriage | Artur Retzbach | Gunnar Tolnæs, Carola Toelle, Albert Steinrück | Silent | |
| Fratricide | Wolfgang Neff | Willy Kaiser-Heyl, Robert Scholz | Drama | |
| Fridericus Rex | Arzén von Cserépy | Otto Gebühr, Albert Steinrück, Gertrud de Lalsky | Historical | Followed by three sequels |
| Fußballwettspiel Erde - Mars | Leopold Blonder | | animation | |
| The Game with Women | Adolf E. Licho | Hanni Weisse, Georg Alexander, Lotte Neumann | Drama | |
| Girl of the Berlin Streets | Richard Eichberg | Lee Parry, Aruth Wartan | Drama | |
| The Girl with the Mask | Victor Janson | Ossi Oswalda, Paul Biensfeldt, Hermann Thimig | Comedy | |
| The Golden Net | Hans Werckmeister | Ernst Hofmann, Julia Serda, Charlotte Ander | Silent | |
| The Good for Nothings | Carl Froelich | Erhard Siedel, Julia Serda | | |
| Die Grundlagen der Einsteinschen Relativitäts-Theorie | Hanns Walter Kornblum | | documentary | Footage later recycled into The Einstein Theory of Relativity |
| Hannele's Journey to Heaven | Urban Gad | | | Based on the play The Assumption of Hannele by Gerhart Hauptmann. |
| His Excellency from Madagascar | Georg Jacoby | Paul Otto, Eva May, Georg Alexander | Thriller | Released in two parts |
| Ihre Hoheit die Tänzerin (Her Highness the Dancer) | Richard Eichberg | Bela Lugosi | | |
| The Homecoming of Odysseus | Max Obal | Luciano Albertini, Claire Lotto, Heinrich Schroth | Historical | |
| The Infernal Power | Robert Wiene | Thea Kasten, Emil Lind | | Lost film. Little is known of its plot. |
| The Inheritance | Conrad Wiene | Rudolf Forster, Philipp Manning, Louis Ralph | Drama | |
| Insulted and Humiliated | Frederic Zelnik | Lya Mara, Erich Kaiser-Titz | Drama | |
| Intimitäten aus dem Leben deutscher Schlangen | Adolf Freiherr von Dungern | | documentary | |
| It Illuminates, My Dear | Paul L. Stein | Mady Christians, Hans Heinrich von Twardowski | Silent | |
| Jeremias | Eugen Illés | | | |
| The Kreutzer Sonata | Rolf Petersen | Frederic Zelnik, Erika Glässner | Silent | |
| The Lady and Her Hairdresser | Heinz Ullstein | Eugen Rex, Maly Delschaft | Comedy | |
| The Lodging House for Gentleman | Louis Ralph | Louis Ralph, Karl Etlinger | Silent | |
| Lola Montez, the King's Dancer | Willi Wolff | Ellen Richter, Arnold Korff | Historical | |
| Louise de Lavallière | Georg Burghardt | Fritz Delius, Ernst Hofmann | Historical | |
| The Lost House | Harry Piel | Harry Piel, Charly Berger | Adventure | |
| The Love Nest | Rudolf Walther-Fein | Paul Wegener, Reinhold Schünzel, Lyda Salmonova | Silent | |
| The Love Story of Cesare Ubaldi | Heinz Schall | Johannes Riemann, Margit Barnay, Ferdinand von Alten | Silent | |
| The Loves of Pharaoh | Ernst Lubitsch | Emil Jannings, Harry Liedtke | Historical | |
| Lowlands | Adolf E. Licho | Lil Dagover, Michael Bohnen | Drama | |
| Lucrezia Borgia | Richard Oswald | Conrad Veidt, Liane Haid | Historical | |
| Luise Millerin | Carl Froelich | Lil Dagover, Paul Hartmann | Historical | |
| Lumpaci the Vagabond | Carl Wilhelm | Hans Albers, Hans Brausewetter | Silent | |
| Lust for Life | Johannes Guter | Ressel Orla, Elga Brink, Walter Janssen | Comedy | |
| Maciste and the Javanese | Uwe Jens Krafft | Bartolomeo Pagano, Carola Toelle, Paul Otto | Adventure | |
| Maciste and the Silver King's Daughter | Luigi Romano Borgnetto | Helena Makowska, Ludwig Hartau | Action | |
| Madame de La Pommeraye's Intrigues | Fritz Wendhausen | Olga Gzovskaya, Margarete Schlegel, Grete Berger | Historical | |
| The Man of Steel | Joseph Delmont | Luciano Albertini, Wilhelm Diegelmann, Carola Toelle | Drama | |
| Marie Antoinette, the Love of a King | Rudolf Meinert | Diana Karenne, Maria Reisenhofer | Historical | |
| Marizza | Friedrich Wilhelm Murnau | Tzwetta Tzatschewa | | Presumed lost film IMDb |
| The Marriage of Princess Demidoff | Frederic Zelnik | Lya Mara, Charles Willy Kayser, Olga Limburg | Drama | |
| The Marriage Swindler | Wolfgang Neff | Karl Falkenberg, Mia Pankau, Willy Fritsch | Comedy | |
| The Men of Frau Clarissa | Fred Sauer | Oskar Marion, Colette Corder | Silent | |
| Miss Julie | Felix Basch | Asta Nielsen, William Dieterle, Lina Lossen | Drama | |
| Miss Rockefeller Is Filming | Erich Schönfelder | Paul Otto, Stella Arbenina, Georg Alexander | Comedy | |
| The Mistress of the King | Frederic Zelnik | Lya Mara, Hans Albers | Silent | |
| Monna Vanna | Richard Eichberg | Lee Parry, Paul Wegener | Historical | |
| Money in the Streets | Reinhold Schünzel | Liane Haid, Eugen Klöpfer | Drama | Co-production with Austria |
| The Moneylender's Daughter | Fritz Bernhardt | Lee Parry, Olaf Storm | Silent | |
| The Mute of Portici | Arthur Günsburg | Carl de Vogt, Claire Lotto, Eduard von Winterstein | Silent | |
| Napoleon's Daughter | Frederic Zelnik | Lya Mara, Ernst Hofmann | Historical | |
| Nathan the Wise | Manfred Noa | Fritz Greiner, Carl de Vogt | Historical | |
| Navarro the Dancer | Ludwig Wolff | Alexander Granach, Asta Nielsen, Iván Petrovich | Silent | |
| Nosferatu | Friedrich Wilhelm Murnau | Max Schreck, Gustav von Wangenheim, Greta Schröder | Horror | First adaptation of Dracula |
| On the Red Cliff | Hanna Henning | Fritz Kortner, Agnes Straub | Drama | |
| Only One Night | Rudolf Walther-Fein | Bruno Eichgrün, Olga Engl | Silent | |
| Orphans of Happiness | Franz Osten | Vilma Bánky, Carl Goetz | Silent | |
| Othello | Dimitri Buchowetzki | Emil Jannings, Werner Krauss, Ica von Lenkeffy | Drama | |
| The Passenger in the Straitjacket | Rudolf Walther-Fein | Bruno Eichgrün, Karl Falkenberg | Crime | |
| The Pearls of Lady Harrison | Heinz Herald | Heinrich George, Gertrude Welcker, Max Landa | Comedy | |
| Peter the Great | Dimitri Buchowetzki | Emil Jannings, Dagny Servaes, Fritz Kortner | Historical | |
| Phantom | Friedrich Wilhelm Murnau | | | |
| Power of Temptation | Paul L. Stein | Lil Dagover, Ilka Grüning | Silent | |
| Prashna's Secret | Ludwig Baetz | Hermann Leffler, Fern Andra, Leopold von Ledebur | Adventure | |
| The Queen of Whitechapel | Wolfgang Neff | Esther Carena, Hermann Vallentin, Claire Rommer | Silent | |
| Revenge of the Bandits | Reinhard Bruck | Asta Nielsen, Bruno Decarli | Silent | |
| Der Rhein in Vergangenheit und Gegenwart | Walther Zürn | | documentary | |
| The Romance of a Poor Sinner | Richard Eichberg | Lee Parry, Aruth Wartan | Silent | |
| Rose of the Asphalt Streets | Richard Löwenbein | Robert Leffler, Olga Engl | Drama | |
| The Shadows of That Night | Fred Sauer | Hans Adalbert Schlettow, Hermann Picha | Silent | |
| Shadows of the Past | Rudolf Biebrach | Gertrude Welcker, Ernst Hofmann, Erich Kaiser-Titz | Silent | |
| Shame | Siegfried Dessauer | Robert Scholz, Fritz Kampers | Drama | |
| Schaffende Hände: Lovis Corinth | Hans Cürlis | | documentary | |
| She and the Three | Ewald André Dupont | Henny Porten, Hermann Thimig | Comedy | |
| Sins of Yesterday | Robert Wuellner | Gina Relly, Alfred Gerasch, Erich Kaiser-Titz | Silent | |
| The Sleeping Volcano | James Bauer | Margit Barnay, Hans Mierendorff, Margarete Schön | Drama | |
| The Stowaway | Victor Janson | Ossi Oswalda, Willy Fritsch | Comedy | |
| The Stream | Felix Basch | Hermann Thimig, Eduard von Winterstein | Silent | |
| The Strumpet's Plaything | Eugen Illés | Colette Corder, Heinrich Schroth, Eduard von Winterstein | Drama | |
| Sunken Worlds | Siegfried Philippi | Victor Varconi, Ria Jende, Hans Albers | Silent | |
| Tabitha, Stand Up | Robert Dinesen | Lotte Neumann, Maria Forescu, Guido Herzfeld | Drama | |
| Tania, the Woman in Chains | Frederic Zelnik | Lya Mara, Erich Kaiser-Titz, Heinrich Peer | Drama | |
| The Testament of Joe Sivers | Conrad Wiene | Hans Albers, Karl Falkenberg | Silent | |
| The Tigress | Ernst Wendt | Margit Barnay, Carl de Vogt | Silent | |
| Tingeltangel | Otto Rippert | Friedrich Kühne, Hans Heinrich von Twardowski | Silent | |
| To the Ladies' Paradise | Lupu Pick | Harry Nestor, Mathilde Sussin | Silent | |
| Today's Children | Adolf E. Licho | Paul Hartmann, Mady Christians | Silent | |
| Trutzi from Trutzberg | Peter Ostermayr | Toni Wittels, Viktor Gehring | Comedy | |
| Two Worlds | Richard Löwenbein | Sascha Gura, Arnold Rieck | Silent | |
| The Unwritten Law | Carl Boese | Karl Falkenberg, Carl Auen | Drama | |
| Vanina | Arthur von Gerlach | Asta Nielsen, Paul Wegener, Paul Hartmann | Historical | |
| Victims of Passion | Paul Czinner | Paul Bildt, Maria Orska | Silent | |
| What Belongs to Darkness | Martin Hartwig | Karl Etlinger, Fritz Kortner | Drama | |
| The White Desert | Ernst Wendt | Carl de Vogt, Eduard von Winterstein, Nora Swinburne | Adventure | |
| Im Winter auf dem Großglockner | Werner Schaarschmidt | | documentary | |
| Women's Sacrifice | Karl Grune | Henny Porten, William Dieterle, Albert Bassermann | Silent | |
| Das Wunder | Walter Ruttmann | | animation | |
| Yellow Star | Wolfgang Neff | Robert Scholz, Fritz Kampers | Drama | |
| Your Valet | Willi Achsel | Erika Glässner, Gerhard Ritterband, Karl Günther | Silent | |
| Yvette, the Fashion Princess | Lya Mara, Erich Kaiser-Titz | Comedy | | |
| Your Bad Reputation | Franz Eckstein | Werner Funck, Olga Limburg, Paul Graetz | Drama | |
| Youth | Fred Sauer | Grete Reinwald, Fritz Rasp | Silent | |
