= Bruno Mondi =

German cinematographer (1903–1991)

Bruno Mondi (30 September 1903, Schwetz, West Prussia – 18 July 1991, Berlin) was a German cameraman and director of photography.

== Biography ==
Mondi graduated from training in 1918 at the School of Cinema and Technology at the School of Photography in Berlin. Soon after, he worked as an assistant cameraman in numerous silent film productions, including Fritz Lang's Destiny (Der müde Tod, 1921).

From 1925, he worked as co-cinematographer with Heinrich Gärtner, and in the comedy film Die tolle Lola. In 1927, he served as executive director of photography. Mondi initially worked primarily with director Richard Eichberg. In 1935, he joined the permanent staff of Veit Harlan.

On 23 March 1933, Mondi joined the Nazi Party. In addition to numerous comedies and entertainment films, he also shot some propaganda films, including the antisemitic production Jud Süß (1940). Despite this, Mondi was hired in 1946 by DEFA, the East German state-owned film studio, as one of its chief cameramen. In this capacity, he made in 1950 the first DEFA colour film Heart of Stone.

In the fifties, he moved to the West German and Austrian film industry. Here he worked especially for several colourful productions by the director Ernst Marischka, especially the popular Sissi trilogy. He also worked for television in the series Förster Horn.

His son Georg Mondi (born 1936) also became a cinematographer.

== Filmography ==
- Luxury Women (1925)
- The Woman with That Certain Something (1925)
- 1926: Durchlaucht Radieschen
- Fabulous Lola (1927)
- The Prince of Pappenheim (1927)
- The Serfs (1928)
- Song (1928)
- The Girl from the Revue (1928)
- The Crazy Countess (1928)
- Autobus Number Two (1929)
- Jenny's Stroll Through Men (1929)
- Night Birds (1930)
- The Copper (1930)
- The Flame of Love (1930)
- The Road to Dishonour (1930)
- Hai-Tang (1930)
- 1930: Zärtlichkeit
- Tingel-Tangel (1930)
- Holzapfel Knows Everything (1931)
- The Daredevil (1931)
- Let's Love and Laugh (1931)
- The Secret of the Red Cat (1931)
- The Invisible Front (1932)
- 1932: Das Millionentestament
- Crime Reporter Holm (1932)
- Today Is the Day (1933)
- 1933: Drei Kaiserjäger
- 1933: Ich kenn’ Dich nicht und liebe Dich
- Greetings and Kisses, Veronika (1933)
- The House of Dora Green (1933)
- Homecoming to Happiness (1933)
- Gypsy Blood (1934)
- 1934: Da stimmt was nicht
- The Secret of Cavelli (1934)
- 1934: Jungfrau gegen Mönch
- The Cousin from Nowhere (1934)
- A Night of Change (1935)
- Trouble Backstairs (1935)
- Pygmalion (1935)
- Fresh Wind from Canada (1935)
- ... nur ein Komödiant (1935)
- The Student of Prague (1935)
- Victoria in Dover (1936)
- The Night With the Emperor (1936)
- 1936: Ave Maria
- A Hoax (1936)
- Fridericus (1937)
- 1937: Die Fledermaus
- Dangerous Game (1937)
- The Citadel of Warsaw (1937)
- Youth (1938)
- Covered Tracks (1938)
- The Barber of Seville (1938)
- You and I (1938)
- The Immortal Heart (1939)
- The Journey to Tilsit (1939)
- Pedro Will Hang (1939)
- The Star of Rio (1940)
- Jud Süß (1940)
- Bismarck (1940)
- Falstaff in Vienna (1940)
- Die goldene Stadt (1942)
- The Great King (1942)
- Immensee (1943)
- Opfergang (1944)
- Kolberg (1945)
- Wozzeck (1947)
- Chemistry and Love (1948)
- Und wieder 48 (1948)
- The Beaver Coat (1949)
- 0 Uhr 15 Zimmer 9 (1949)
- Rotation (1949)
- Heart of Stone (1950)
- The Csardas Princess (1951)
- Sensation in San Remo (1951)
- Pension Schöller (1952)
- Mask in Blue (1953)
- Southern Nights (1953)
- If I Only Have Your Love (1953)
- Girl with a Future (1954)
- Victoria in Dover (1954)
- Prisoners of Love (1954)
- The Sinful Village (1954)
- Die Deutschmeister (1955)
- Sissi (1955)
- Love Is Just a Fairytale (1955)
- The Happy Village (1955)
- Winter in the Woods (1956)
- Sissi – The Young Empress (1956)
- Opera Ball (1956)
- 1957: Casino de Paris
- Das Schloß in Tirol (1957)
- Sissi – Fateful Years of an Empress (1957)
- Scampolo (1958)
- The Copper (1958)
- The House of Three Girls (1958)
- Embezzled Heaven (1958)
- For Love and Others (1959)
- The Man Who Walked Through the Wall (1959)
- Old Heidelberg (1959)
- Willy the Private Detective (1961)
- The True Jacob (1961)
- Davon träumen alle Mädchen (1961)
- Mark of the Tortoise (1964)
