= The Girl from the Revue =

1928 film

- Directed by: Richard Eichberg
- Written by: Alfred Halm; Hans Sturm
- Produced by: Richard Eichberg
- Starring: Dina Gralla; Werner Fuetterer; Max Hansen
- Cinematography: Heinrich Gärtner; Bruno Mondi
- Music by: Artur Guttmann
- Production companies: Richard Eichberg-Film; UFA
- Distributed by: UFA
- Release date: 27 July 1928
- Country: Germany
- Languages: Silent; German intertitles

The Girl from the Revue (German: Das Girl von der Revue) is a 1928 German silent film directed by Richard Eichberg and starring Dina Gralla, Werner Fuetterer, and Max Hansen.

The film's sets were designed by the art directors Bruno Lutz and Franz Seemann.

== Cast ==
- Dina Gralla as Kitty von den Taylor-Girls
- Werner Fuetterer as Graf Axel Holm, Attaché
- Max Hansen as Baron Erik Lund, Axels Vetter
- Albert Paulig as Mister Taylor, Impresario der Taylor-Girls
- Julius Falkenstein as Graf Roderich Holm, Axels Onkel
- Emmy Wyda as Die Gouvernesse der Girls
- Valerie Boothby as Georgette Laroque, Varieté-Tänzerin
- Else Reval as Köchin

== Bibliography ==
- Ward, Janet (2001). Weimar Surfaces: Urban Visual Culture in 1920s Germany. Berkeley: University of California Press. ISBN 978-0-520-92473-4.
