= Violetta Napierska =

German-Italian actress

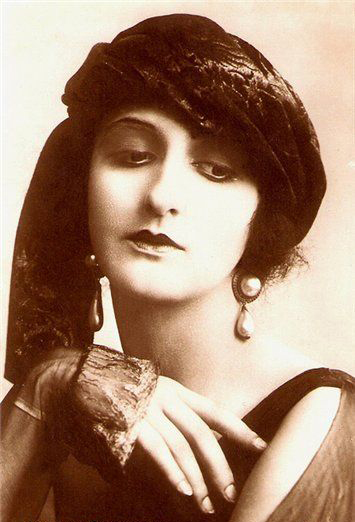
- Born: 19 July 1900; Geneva, Switzerland
- Died: 18 September 1985 (aged 85); Rocca di Papa, Italy
- Other names: Violette Napierska; Viola Heermann
- Occupation: Actress
- Spouse: Giovanni Seyta

Violetta Napierska (sometimes Violette Napierska) was a German-Italian dancer and film actress. Most of her acting career she worked in German silent films, often with Béla Lugosi, Lee Parry and director Richard Eichberg. She was born in Switzerland in 1900 and died in Italy in 1985 (at age 85).

The band Darling Violetta took their name from the salutation allegedly used by Béla Lugosi in a poem to Violetta Napierska.

== Filmography ==
original title	English title	year
La Vena d'Oro		1955
Coeur de gueux		1936
Cuor di vagabondo		1936
La coqueluche de ces dames		1935
Le p'tit Parigot		1926
Der Mitternachtszug		1923
Die graue Macht		1923
Ihre Hoheit die Tänzerin (later retitled The Ordeal of Eva Grunwald)		1922
Der Verfluchte		1921
Die Macht des Blutes - 2. In der Schlinge des Inders		1921
Die Macht des Blutes - 1. Der Tod in Venedig		1921
Die Kette der Schuld		1921
Sträflingsketten - 2. Das Geständnis vor dem Tod		1920
Staatsanwalt Briands Abenteuer - 2. Dem Wellengrab entronnen		1920
Staatsanwalt Briands Abenteuer - 1. Die ungültige Ehe		1920
Der Tanz auf dem Vulkan - 2. Der Tod des Großfürsten	Dance on the Volcano II; Daughter of the Night (USA)	1920
Der Tanz auf dem Vulkan - 1. Sybil Young	Dance on the Volcano I Daughter of the Night (USA)	1920
Hypnosis (aka Slave of a Foreign Will)	Hypnosis	1920
Der Fluch der Menschheit, 2. Teil - Im Rausche der Milliarden	In the Ecstasy of Billions	1920
Der Fluch der Menschheit, 1. Teil - Die Tochter der Arbeit	The Curse of Man	1920
Die Abenteuer der Marquise von Königsmarck		1919
Jettatore		1919
Nonne und Tänzerin		1919
Sünden der Eltern	Sins of the Parents	1919
