= Fabulous Lola =

1927 film directed by Richard Eichberg

- Movie poster
- Directed by: Richard Eichberg
- Written by: Gustav Kadelburg (book); Arthur Rebner (libretto); Hans Sturm
- Produced by: Richard Eichberg
- Starring: Lilian Harvey; Harry Halm; Hans Junkermann
- Cinematography: Heinrich Gärtner; Bruno Mondi
- Music by: Artur Guttmann; Hugo Hirsch
- Production companies: Richard Eichberg-Film; UFA
- Distributed by: Parufamet
- Release date: 28 October 1927
- Country: Germany
- Languages: Silent; German intertitles

Fabulous Lola (German: Die tolle Lola) is a 1927 German silent comedy film directed by Richard Eichberg and starring Lilian Harvey, Harry Halm and Hans Junkermann. The film's sets were designed by the art director Jacek Rotmil. It was made at the Johannisthal Studios in Berlin.

The film is based on an operetta of the same name from 1919 by Hugo Hirsch (1884–1961), which in turn was based on Gustav Kadelburg's 1906 play Der Weg zur Hölle (The Road to Hell). The operetta was filmed again in 1954.

== Cast ==
- Lilian Harvey as dancer Tilly Schneider aka Lola Cornero
- Harry Halm as music hall director Bendler
- Hans Junkermann as music hall director Dornwald
- Julia Serda as Agathe Dornwald
- Gyula Szőreghy as Enrique de la Plata

== Bibliography ==
- Grange, William. Cultural Chronicle of the Weimar Republic. Scarecrow Press, 2008.
