= The Serfs =

1928 film directed by Richard Eichberg

- Directed by: Richard Eichberg
- Written by: Pierre Newsky; Hans Sturm
- Produced by: Richard Eichberg
- Starring: Heinrich George; Mona Maris; Maria Reisenhofer; Harry Halm
- Cinematography: Heinrich Gartner; Bruno Mondi
- Music by: Giuseppe Becce
- Production company: Richard Eichberg-Film
- Distributed by: Parufamet
- Release date: 11 January 1928
- Running time: 91 minutes
- Country: Germany
- Languages: Silent; German intertitles

The Serfs (German: Die Leibeigenen) is a 1928 German silent drama film directed by Richard Eichberg and starring Heinrich George, Mona Maris and Maria Reisenhofer. It was shot at the Babelsberg Studios in Berlin. The film's art direction was by Jacek Rotmil. It premiered on 11 January 1928 at the Gloria-Palast.

== Cast ==
- Heinrich George as Wildhüter Nikita
- Mona Maris as Leibeigene Tatjana, eine Waise
- Maria Reisenhofer as Gräfin Danischeff
- Harry Halm as Alexej Danischeff, ihr Sohn
- Oskar Homolka as Gouverneur Fürst Kurganow
- Jutta Jol as Sonja Kurganow, seine Tochter

== Bibliography ==
- Grange, William. Cultural Chronicle of the Weimar Republic. Scarecrow Press, 2008.
