= Her Dark Secret =

1929 film directed by Johannes Guter

- Directed by: Johannes Guter
- Written by: Robert Liebmann; Frank Maraun
- Produced by: Günther Stapenhorst
- Starring: Lilian Harvey; Willy Fritsch; Harry Halm; Warwick Ward
- Cinematography: Carl Drews; Erich Nitzschmann
- Production company: UFA
- Distributed by: UFA
- Release date: 19 January 1929
- Running time: 104 minutes
- Country: Germany
- Languages: Silent; German intertitles

Her Dark Secret (German: Ihr dunkler Punkt) is a 1929 German silent comedy film directed by Johannes Guter and starring Lilian Harvey, Willy Fritsch, and Harry Halm. The film reunited Harvey and Fritsch, who had previously appeared together in Chaste Susanne (1926), although this time, their characters become a couple at the end of the film. This provided a template for a number of popular films over the following decade, such as The Three from the Filling Station. It was shot at the Tempelhof Studios in Berlin. The film's sets were designed by the art director Jacek Rotmil.

== Cast ==
- Lilian Harvey as Lilian von Trucks / Yvette
- Willy Fritsch as Erik Termeulen
- Harry Halm as Leopold
- Warwick Ward as Roger
- Sig Arno as Paul
- Hermann Speelmans as Emil
- Wilhelm Bendow as Juwelier Burggraf
- Max Ehrlich as Empfangschef
- Paul Biensfeldt as Kommisar in Berlin
- Julius Falkenstein as Kommissar in Nizza
- Karl Platen as Nachtportier

== Bibliography ==
- Ascheid, Antje (2003). Hitler's Heroines: Stardom and Womanhood in Nazi Cinema. Philadelphia: Temple University Press. ISBN 978-1-56639-984-5.
