= Jettatore =

Jettatore may refer to:

- Jettatore (1938 film), an Argentine musical drama film
- Jettatore (1919 film), a German silent crime film
