= Living Buddhas =

1925 film

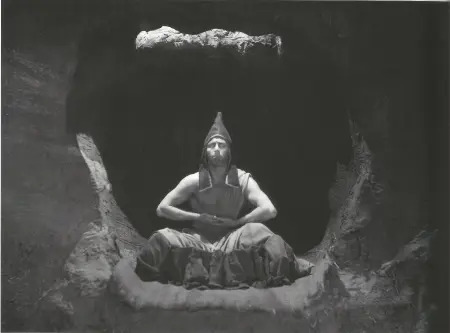
- German: Lebende Buddhas
- Directed by: Paul Wegener
- Written by: Hans Sturm; Paul Wegener
- Produced by: Berthold Held
- Starring: Paul Wegener; Asta Nielsen; Käthe Haack
- Cinematography: Reimar Kuntze; Josif Rona; Guido Seeber
- Music by: Willy Schmidt-Gentner
- Production company: Wegener-Film
- Distributed by: Terra Film
- Release date: 12 May 1925
- Running time: 139 minutes (in 5 chapters)
- Country: Germany
- Languages: Silent; German intertitles

Living Buddhas (German: Lebende Buddhas) is a 1925 German silent film in five chapters, directed by Paul Wegener and starring Wegener, Asta Nielsen and Käthe Haack. It was co-written by Wegener and Hans Sturm (who also played Professor Campbell in the film). Wegener cast himself as the evil High Llama of a devil cult. Danish actress Nielsen's film career went downhill quickly with the advent of sound films. It was made at the Staaken Studios in Berlin. Only five minutes of footage survive of the original 139-minute running time.

== Plot ==
Professor Campbell and his young wife travel to Tibet on an expedition to investigate a primitive and savage cult. The high priest of the cult plans to use Mrs. Campbell as a human sacrifice. The professor succeeds in getting the entire party out of Tibet, and even manages to bring with him a sacred document belonging to the cult. Once back in Europe, he tries to decipher the parchment, but the cult members have followed him home.

== Cast ==
- Paul Wegener as Großlama (the High Llama)
- Asta Nielsen as Tibetanerin
- Käthe Haack as Frau Campbell
- Gregori Chmara as Jebsun
- Carl Ebert as Professor Smith
- Friedrich Kühne as 1. Lama
- Max Pohl as 2. Lama
- Heinrich Schroth as Dr. Smith
- Hans Sturm as Professor Campbell
- Eduard Rothauser
