= The Prince of Pappenheim =

1927 film directed by Richard Eichberg

- Directed by: Richard Eichberg
- Written by: Hugo Hirsch, Franz Arnold and Ernst Bach (operetta), Robert Liebmann
- Produced by: Richard Eichberg
- Starring: Mona Maris; Curt Bois; Dina Gralla; Lydia Potechina
- Cinematography: Heinrich Gärtner; Bruno Mondi
- Music by: Giuseppe Becce
- Production company: Richard Eichberg-Film
- Distributed by: UFA
- Release date: 7 September 1927
- Running time: 91 minutes
- Country: Germany
- Languages: Silent; German intertitles

The Prince of Pappenheim (German: Der Fürst von Pappenheim) is a 1927 German silent comedy film directed by Richard Eichberg and starring Mona Maris, Curt Bois and Dina Gralla. Bois' character of an ambitious young man was closely modelled on the early film appearances of Ernst Lubitsch. It was shot at the Babelsberg Studios and on location in Baden-Baden. The film's art direction was by Jacek Rotmil. It premiered at the Gloria-Palast in Berlin.

The film adapts an operetta by Franz Robert Arnold and Ernst Bach, Der Fürst von Pappenheim.

== Cast ==
- Mona Maris as Prinzessin Antoinette
- Curt Bois as Egon Fürst
- Dina Gralla as Diana, genannt Diddi
- Lydia Potechina as Camilla Pappenheim, Inhaberin des Modesalons
- Hans Junkermann as Fürst Ottokar, Antoinettes Vater
- Werner Fuetterer as Sascha, Prinz von Gorgonien
- Gyula Szőreghy as Graf Katschkoff
- Albert Paulig as Adjutant des Prinzen

== Bibliography ==
- Prawer, S.S. Between Two Worlds: The Jewish Presence in German and Austrian Film, 1910-1933. Berghahn Books, 2005.
