= The Daredevil =

1931 film directed by Richard Eichberg

- Directed by: Richard Eichberg
- Written by: Franz Höllering (novel); Joseph Than; Richard Eichberg
- Produced by: Richard Eichberg; Joseph Than
- Starring: Hans Albers; Gerda Maurus; Mártha Eggerth
- Cinematography: Heinrich Gartner; Bruno Mondi
- Edited by: Willy Zeunert
- Music by: Hans May
- Production company: Richard Eichberg-Film
- Distributed by: Süd-Film
- Release date: 26 November 1931
- Running time: 92 minutes
- Country: Germany
- Language: German

The Daredevil (German: Der Draufgänger) is a 1931 German crime film directed by Richard Eichberg and starring Hans Albers, Gerda Maurus and Mártha Eggerth.

The film's sets were designed by the art directors Hans Minzloff and Jacek Rotmil. It was shot on location in Hamburg and at the Johannisthal Studios in Berlin. Eichberg's assistant director was Géza von Cziffra.

== Synopsis ==
A Port of Hamburg policeman, known by his colleagues as "The Daredevil" because of his propensity for action, rescues a young woman from the water. She appears to be connected with an American millionaire whose yacht is cruising off shore.

== Cast ==
- Hans Albers as Hans Röder, Hafenpolizist
- Sigurd Lohde as Fred Patterson, ein reicher Amerikaner
- Ernst Stahl-Nachbaur as George Brown aka Mac Born
- Gerda Maurus as Gloria - seine Freundin
- Mártha Eggerth as Trude, Animierreiterin
- Fritz Klippel as Parker, Browns Komplize
- Reinhold Bernt as Willy, Stallmeister American Hyppodrom
- Leonard Steckel as Barini, Inhaber American Hippodrom
- Anna Müller-Lincke as Frau Pahlke, Inhaberin Artistenpension
- Eugen Burg as Andersen, Kriminalkommissar
- Senta Söneland as Fräulein Schönholz, Kriminalbeamtin
- Alfred Beierle as Martin Timm, Hafenpolizist

== Bibliography ==
- Bock, Hans-Michael; Bergfelder, Tim, eds. (2009). The Concise Cinegraph: Encyclopaedia of German Cinema. Berghahn Books. ISBN 978-1-57181-655-9.
