= Lee Parry =

German actress (1901–1977)

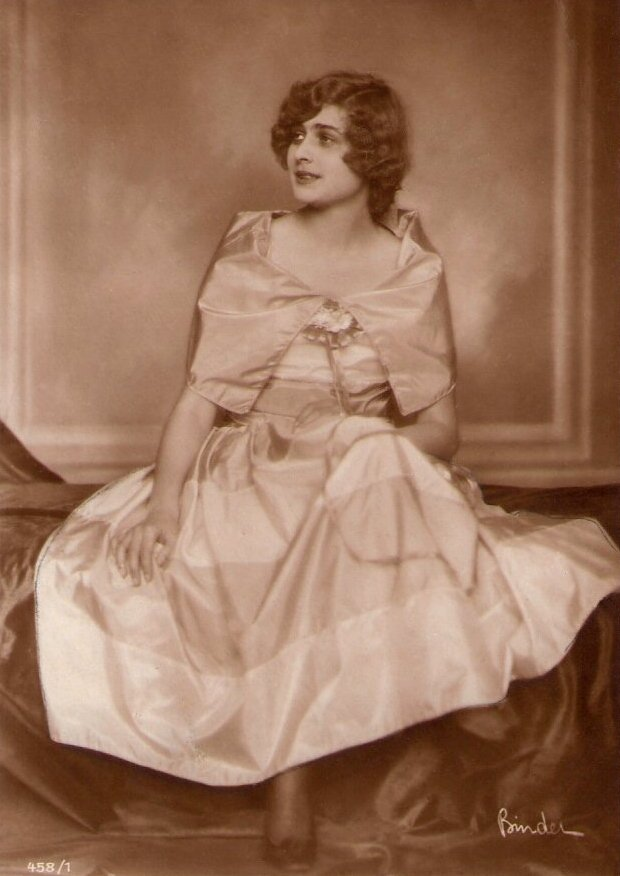
- Parry, c. 1920
- Born: Mathilde Charlotte Benz; 14 January 1901; Munich, German Empire
- Died: 24 January 1977 (aged 75); Bad Tölz, Bavaria, West Germany
- Occupation: Actress
- Years active: 1919–1939
- Spouses: Richard Eichberg (m. 1919; div. 1925): Siegmund Breslauer

Lee Parry (born Mathilde Charlotte Benz, 14 January 1901 – 24 January 1977) was a German film actress of the silent era. She appeared in more than 40 films between 1919 and 1939.

== Biography ==
Lee Parry was born Mathilde Charlotte Benz on 14 January 1901, daughter of the stage actor, opera tenor, and variety director Josef Friedrich Benz (1863–1928), who was popularly known as "Papa Benz", and the singer Mathilde Benz (1880–1967).

Parry was discovered by director Richard Eichberg in 1919, who she subsequently married. She made her film debut in Jettatore, followed by Sins of the Parents and Nonne und Tänzerin (all 1919), all of which were directed by Eichberg.

Parry was at the pinnacle of her career when she starred in the historical drama Monna Vanna (1922) opposite Paul Wegener and Hans Sturm. She co-starred in several films with Bela Lugosi during the period in which he lived in Germany, including Hypnosis and The Curse of Man.

In addition to acting in films, Parry also acted on the stage and starred in several Viennese operettas. She also embarked on a successful music career, recording popular songs such as "Ich bin von Kopf bis Fuß auf Liebe eingestellt". Her final screen appearance was in Adieu Vienne (1939).

In 1956, Parry moved to Buenos Aires with her second husband, Siegmund Breslauer, who was a director at the German exile theater Freie Deutsche Bühne. Following a theatrical comeback in the play Manon, she continued to perform for several more years on various stages across South America.

Parry died on 24 January 1977 in Bad Tölz.

== Filmography ==
- Jettatore (1919)
- Sins of the Parents (1919)
- Nonne und Tänzerin (1919)
- The Curse of Man (1920)
- Hypnose: Sklaven fremden Willens (1920)
- Staatsanwalt Briands Abenteuer (1920)
- Sträflingsketten (1920)
- Dance on the Volcano (1920)
- In the Ecstasy of Billions (1920)
- Die Macht des Blutes (1921)
- The Living Propeller (1921)
- Die Bettelgräfin vom Kurfürstendamm (1921)
- Die Ehe der Hedda Olsen oder Die brennende Akrobatin (1921)
- Evelyn's Love Adventures (1921)
- Ihre Hoheit die Tänzerin (1922)
- Girl of the Berlin Streets (1922)
- The Romance of a Poor Sinner (1922)
- Monna Vanna (1922)
- The Moneylender's Daughter (1922)
- Fräulein Raffke (1923)
- The Most Beautiful Woman in the World (1924)
- The Motorist Bride (1925)
- The Woman with That Certain Something (1925)
- Women of Luxury (1925)
- The Love Trap (1925)
- Professor Imhof (1926)
- Fedora (1926)
- Light-Hearted Isabel (1927)
- Regine, die Tragödie einer Frau (1927)
- The Woman Who Couldn't Say No (1927)
- Regine (1927)
- The Woman with the World Record (1927)
- The Strange Night of Helga Wangen (1928)
- Nile Water (1928)
- Anastasia, the False Czar's Daughter (1928)
- Autobus Number Two (1929)
- The Merry Wives of Vienna (1931)
- A Bit of Love (1932)
- Viennese Waltz (1932)
- Love at First Sight (1932)
- The Big Bluff (1933)
- No Day Without You (1933)
- The Gentleman from Maxim's (1933)
- Lessons in Love (1935)
- Goodbye Vienna (1939)
