= Jacek Rotmil =

Russian-born art director (1888–1944)

- Born: 24 November 1888; St. Petersburg, Russian Empire
- Died: 31 July 1944 (aged 55); Warsaw, German-occupied Poland
- Other name: Jacques Rotmil
- Occupations: Art director; production designer
- Years active: 1919–1940

Jacek Rotmil (24 November 1888 – 31 July 1944) was a Russian-born art director and production designer who worked on 100 films during his career. Following the First World War, Rotmil entered the booming German film industry and worked prolifically until 1933. Following the Nazi rise to power, Rotmil went into exile in Poland where he was employed frequently on Polish and Yiddish productions. He had first become involved in the Polish film industry in 1930 when working on the sound version of the Polish film Exile to Siberia in Berlin.

After the Germans occupied Poland in 1939, Rotmil went into hiding. He was later arrested and executed in Pawiak prison shortly before the Warsaw Uprising. He was one of many Polish film personnel to die during the Second World War.

== Selected filmography ==
- Evelyn's Love Adventures (1921)
- In Thrall to the Claw (1921)
- The Living Propeller (1921)
- Monna Vanna (1922)
- Prashna's Secret (1922)
- The Romance of a Poor Sinner (1922)
- Fräulein Raffke (1923)
- Das Milliardensouper (1923)
- The Most Beautiful Woman in the World (1924)
- The Heart on the Rhine (1925)
- The Motorist Bride (1925)
- Women of Luxury (1925)
- In the Valleys of the Southern Rhine (1925)
- Niniche (1925)
- Passion (1925)
- The Schimeck Family (1926)
- The Ones Down There (1926)
- Vienna, How it Cries and Laughs (1926)
- The Queen of the Baths (1926)
- The Divorcée (1926)
- The Blue Danube (1926)
- The Adventurers (1926)
- Chaste Susanne (1926)
- The Fallen (1926)
- The Prince of Pappenheim (1927)
- The Girl from Abroad (1927)
- The Orlov (1927)
- The Prince's Child (1927)
- Flirtation (1927)
- Carnival Magic (1927)
- Vacation from Marriage (1927)
- Fabulous Lola (1927)
- Circle of Lovers (1927)
- The Serfs (1928)
- Yacht of the Seven Sins (1928)
- The Blue Mouse (1928)
- Sajenko the Soviet (1928)
- Under Suspicion (1928)
- The Criminal of the Century (1928)
- Because I Love You (1928)
- Rhenish Girls and Rhenish Wine (1929)
- The Convict from Istanbul (1929)
- Phantoms of Happiness (1929)
- Ship in Distress (1929)
- The Model from Montparnasse (1929)
- Her Dark Secret (1929)
- Dolly Gets Ahead (1930)
- Troika (1930)
- Exile to Siberia (1930)
- Peace of Mind (1931)
- The Office Manager (1931)
- The Daredevil (1931)
- The Forester's Daughter (1931)
- The Blue of Heaven (1932)
- Distorting at the Resort (1932)
- Two Lucky Days (1932)
- Holzapfel Knows Everything (1932)
- Life Sentence (1933)
- Prokurator Alicja Horn (1933)
- The Story of Sin (1933)
- Is Lucyna a Girl? (1934)
- Uhlan's Pledge (1934)
- Two Joasias (1935)
- Rapsodia Bałtyku (1935)
- The Haunted Manor (1936)
- The Leper (1936)
- Róza (1936)
- American Adventure (1936)
- Count Michorowski (1937)
- The Vow (1937)
- Three Troublemakers (1937)
- The Girls from Nowolipki (1937)
- Miss Minister Is Dancing (1937)
- Heather (1938)
- The Line (1938)
- Ostatnia brygada (1938)
- Krystyna's Lie (1939)
- Robert and Bertram (1938)
- A Sportsman Against His Will (1940)

== Bibliography ==
- Haltof, Marek. Polish Film and the Holocaust: Politics and Memory. Berghahn Books, 2012.
- Skaff, Sheila. The Law of the Looking Glass: Cinema in Poland, 1896–1939. Ohio University Press, 2008.
