= Fräulein Raffke =

1923 film directed by Richard Eichberg

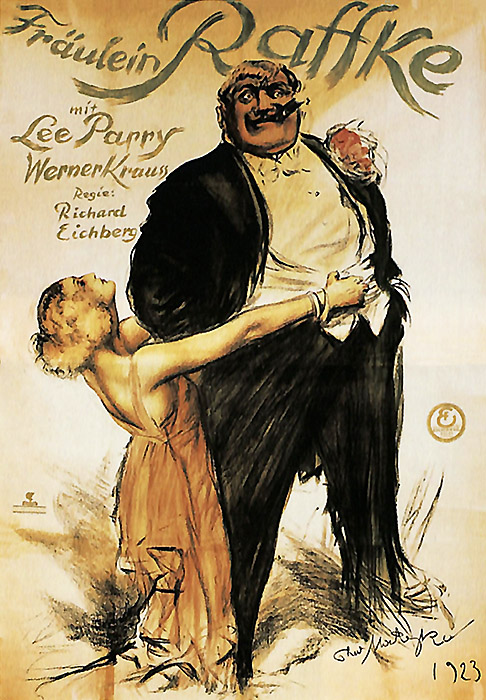
- German poster
- Directed by: Richard Eichberg
- Written by: Hans Behrendt; Helmuth Orthmann
- Produced by: Richard Eichberg
- Starring: Werner Krauss; Lydia Potechina; Lee Parry
- Cinematography: Erich Grimmler; Heinrich Gärtner
- Production company: Richard Eichberg-Film
- Distributed by: Süd-Film
- Release date: 18 September 1923
- Running time: 105 minutes
- Country: Germany
- Languages: Silent; German intertitles

Fräulein Raffke is a 1923 German silent drama film directed by Richard Eichberg and starring Werner Krauss, Lydia Potechina and Lee Parry. A "Raffke" was Weimar era slang for a money accumulator. The film's sets were designed by the art director Jacek Rotmil. It premiered at the Marmorhaus in Berlin.

== Cast ==
- Werner Krauss as Emil Raffke
- Lydia Potechina as Emils Wife
- Lee Parry as Lilli Raffke
- Harry Hardt as Paul Grune
- Vivian Gibson as Tänzerin Tatjana
- Hans Albers as Baron
- Heinrich Peer
- Loni Nest as Kind
- Max Grünberg as Pauls Sozius

== Bibliography ==
- Bock, Hans-Michael & Bergfelder, Tim. The Concise CineGraph. Encyclopedia of German Cinema. Berghahn Books, 2009.
