= Dinner Is Served =

1936 film

- Directed by: Hans H. Zerlett
- Written by: Toni Impekoven (play); Eduard Ritter (play); Hans H. Zerlett
- Produced by: Franz Vogel
- Starring: Herbert Hübner; Gertrud de Lalsky; Hertha Guthmar
- Cinematography: Georg Krause
- Edited by: Lothar Buhle
- Music by: Leo Leux
- Production company: Euphono-Film
- Distributed by: Kiba Kinobetriebsanstalt (Austria)
- Release date: 14 August 1936
- Running time: 91 minutes
- Country: Germany
- Language: German

Dinner Is Served (German: Diener lassen bitten) is a 1936 German comedy film directed by Hans H. Zerlett and starring Herbert Hübner, Gertrud de Lalsky, and Hertha Guthmar. The film is a comedy set around the British aristocracy.

The film's sets were designed by the art director Karl Machus.

== Cast ==
- Herbert Hübner as Lord Wimple
- Gertrud de Lalsky as Lady Wimple
- Hertha Guthmar as Georgia
- Arthur Schröder as Henry
- Josef Eichheim as Lord Spiller
- Hansi Arnstaedt as Lady Spiller
- Hans Söhnker as Robert, ihr Sohn
- Helmut Weiss as Herzog Birry-Birry
- Joe Stöckel as James Potter
- Fita Benkhoff as Henrietta, seine Frau
- Rose Stradner as Mary, Potters Tochter
- Walter Steinbeck as William, the cook
- Eva Tinschmann as Anny, the cook
- Ursula Deinert as Daisy, die Zofe
- Fred Becker as Gregor, the Butler
- Ernst Fritz Fürbringer as Charles, the Servant
- José Held as Jim, der Reitknecht
- Willy Cronauer as John, der Chauffeur
- Bruno Ziener as Jerome, der Butler
- Gustl Körner as Dora, die Wirtschafterin
- O. E. Hasse as Francis, Chauffeur
- Erwin Biegel as Hoppy, der Diener
- Erika Stauffenberg as Bessie, die Zofe
- Kurt Hagen as Schmied
- Georg Irmer as Lohndiener
- Arnulf Schröder as Bow, Schneidermeister

== Bibliography ==
- Goble, Alan (1999). The Complete Index to Literary Sources in Film. Berlin: Walter de Gruyter. ISBN 978-3-11-095194-3.
- Waldman, Harry (2008). Nazi Films in America, 1933–1942. Jefferson, NC: McFarland. ISBN 978-0-7864-3861-7.
