= The Girl on the Road =

1925 film directed by Richard Eichberg

- Directed by: Richard Eichberg
- Written by: Helmuth Orthmann
- Starring: Lilian Harvey; Hans Brausewetter
- Cinematography: Willy Hameister
- Production company: Richard Eichberg-Film
- Distributed by: Süd-Film
- Release date: 30 December 1925
- Running time: 90 minutes
- Country: Germany
- Languages: Silent; German intertitles

The Girl on the Road (German: Die Kleine vom Bummel) is a 1925 German silent comedy film directed by Richard Eichberg and starring Lilian Harvey and Hans Brausewetter. It was shot at the Johannisthal Studios in Berlin with location shooting in cities across Germany. The film's sets were designed by the art director Kurt Richter.

== Cast ==
In alphabetical order

- Geo Bergal as Jüngling
- Hans Brausewetter as Kavalier ohne Bedenken
- Dina Gralla as Die 'Erfahrene'
- Lilian Harvey as Die 'Kleine'
- Ellen Heel as Dame von Welt
- Hans Junkermann as Präsident des Rennklubs
- Hans Sturm as Gerichtsvollzieher
- Ernst Winar as Herrenreiter

== Bibliography ==
- Grange, William. Cultural Chronicle of the Weimar Republic. Scarecrow Press, 2008.
