= Night Birds (film) =

1930 film directed by Richard Eichberg

- Theatrical release poster
- Directed by: Richard Eichberg
- Written by: Victor Kendall; Miles Malleson
- Produced by: Richard Eichberg
- Starring: Jack Raine; Muriel Angelus; Jameson Thomas; Eve Gray
- Cinematography: Heinrich Gärtner; Bruno Mondi
- Music by: John Reynders
- Production companies: British International Pictures (UK); Richard Eichberg-Film GmbH (Germany)
- Distributed by: Wardour Films (UK)
- Release date: 16 October 1930
- Running time: 97 minutes
- Countries: Weimar Republic; United Kingdom
- Language: English

Night Birds is a 1930 British-German thriller film directed by Richard Eichberg and starring Jack Raine, Muriel Angelus and Jameson Thomas. It was written by Victor Kendall and Miles Malleson. A separate German language version, The Copper, was made at the same time.

== Plot ==
Detective Harry Cross is on the trail of murderer and bandit Flash Jack. So is amateur sleuther Deacon Lake. Cross pursues Jack via Jack's girlfriend Dolly who works at a nightclub, and eventually unmasks the nightclub's owner as Jack.

== Cast ==
- Jack Raine as Sgt. Harry Cross
- Muriel Angelus as Dolly Mooreland
- Jameson Thomas as Deacon Lake
- Eve Gray as Mary Cross
- Franklyn Bellamy as Charlo Bianci
- Garry Marsh as Archibald Bunny
- Frank Perfitt as Inspector Warrington
- Hay Petrie as Scotty
- Harry Terry as Toothpick Jeff
- Margaret Yarde as Mrs. Hallick
- Ellen Pollock as Flossie
- Cyril Butcher as 'Dancer' Johnny
- Barbara Kilner as Mabel

== Reception ==
Kine Weekly wrote: "Eichberg's production is very efficient in technical effects, but his plot is full of loose ends. The mystery is so full of 'red herring' trails that one is apt to lose interest in the characters. The dialogue is not a strong point. One feels that had it been better, the plot would have gained some conviction and force."

Film Weekly wrote: "Despite the fact that the acute fim-goer will probably spot the culprit early in the film, there are plenty of thrills to entertain you in this British picture, which moves faster than most of its type. Jack Raine, Jameson Thomas and the small-part players give good performances, but the feminine members of the cast are not so effective."

The Daily Film Renter wrote: "Jack Raine, scarcely the physical type for the detective role, acts it in an effective comedy vein nevertheless. Jameson Thomas is as good as ever as the mysterious Lake, Muriel Angelus adequate as the vamp, and Eve Gray has only to look pretty. Franklyn Bellamy has an effective heavy part and a really excellent piece of comedy is put over by Margaret Yarde as a police spy. Despite a certain number of dramatic loose ends, Night Birds will provide exciting fare for popular audiences."
