= Wilhelm Bendow =

German actor (1884–1950)

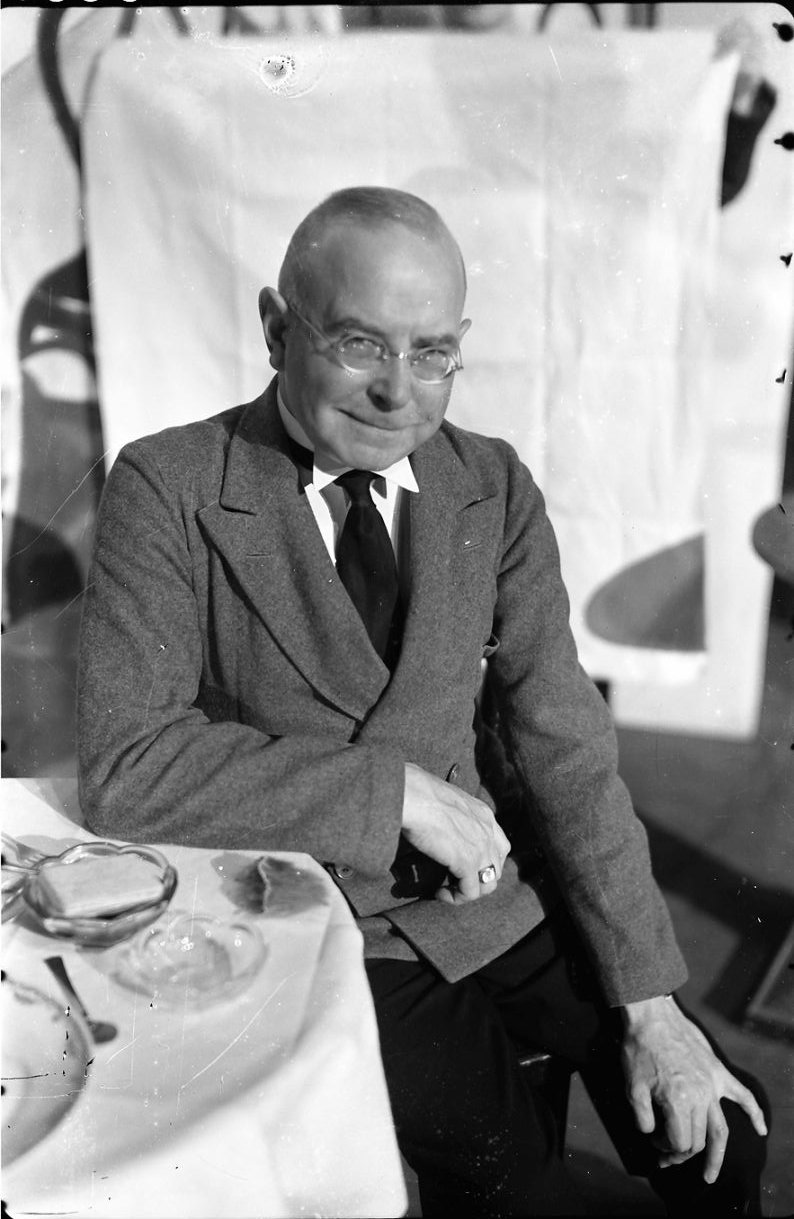
- Wilhelm Bendow in 1936
- Born: 29 September 1884; Einbeck, German Empire
- Died: 29 May 1950 (aged 65); Einbeck, West Germany
- Occupation: Film actor
- Years active: 1913–1947

Wilhelm Bendow (29 September 1884 – 29 May 1950) was a German film actor who appeared in many films during his career. Bendow made his debut in the 1913 film Aus eines Mannes Mädchenzeit.

== Selected filmography ==
- Lust for Life (1922)
- La Boheme (1923)
- The Little Napoleon (1923)
- Die Fledermaus (1923)
- Wood Love (1925)
- The Woman with That Certain Something (1925)
- Chaste Susanne (1926)
- The Brothers Schellenberg (1926)
- We Belong to the Imperial-Royal Infantry Regiment (1926)
- Roses from the South (1926)
- The Divorcée (1926)
- His Toughest Case (1926)
- My Aunt, Your Aunt (1927)
- The False Prince (1927)
- A Crazy Night (1927)
- Carnival Magic (1927)
- Her Dark Secret (1929)
- German Wine (1929)
- The Tender Relatives (1930)
- Alraune (1930)
- A Gentleman for Hire (1930)
- The Blonde Nightingale (1930)
- The Emperor's Sweetheart (1931)
- Madame Pompadour (1931)
- Storms of Passion (1932)
- A Mad Idea (1932)
- The Two Seals (1934)
- His Late Excellency (1935)
- Knockout (1935)
- Lessons in Love (1935)
- The Schimeck Family (1935)
- The Beggar Student (1936)
- The Bashful Casanova (1936)
- Land of Love (1937)
- The Divine Jetta (1937)
- The Irresistible Man (1937)
- The Roundabouts of Handsome Karl (1938)
- My Aunt, Your Aunt (1939)
- Doctor Crippen (1942)
- The Thing About Styx (1942)
- We Make Music (1942)
- My Friend Josephine (1942)
- Münchhausen (1943)
- I Entrust My Wife to You (1943)
- The Golden Spider (1943)
- A Flea in Her Ear (1943)
- A Cheerful House (1944)
- Tell the Truth (1946)
- No Place for Love (1947)
- King of Hearts (1947)

== Bibliography ==
- Elsässer, Thomas. A Second Life: German Cinema's First Decades. Amsterdam University Press, 1996.
