= False Shame =

1926 film

- Directed by: Rudolf Biebrach
- Written by: Nicholas Kaufmann; Armin Petersen; Curt Thomalla
- Starring: Rudolf Biebrach; Olaf Storm; Eric Cordell; Niuta Helling
- Cinematography: Max Brink; Willy Gaebel
- Production company: Universum Film AG
- Distributed by: Universum Film AG
- Release date: 15 March 1926
- Country: Germany
- Languages: Silent; German intertitles

False Shame (German: Falsche Scham) is a 1926 German silent drama film directed by Rudolf Biebrach and starring Biebrach, Olaf Storm and Eric Cordell. It premiered in Berlin on 15 March 1926.

== Cast ==
- Rudolf Biebrach as Sanitätsrat
- Olaf Storm as Student
- Eric Cordell as Vater
- Niuta Helling as Mutter
- Karin Soedenborg as Amme
- Richard Wirth as Bauer
- Frida Richard as Bäuerin
- Erra Bognar as Deren Nichte
- Ulrich Bettac as Stadtreisender
- Arthur Kronburger as Der vortragende Arzt
- Willy Kroschky as Gymnasiast
- Werner Padlowsky as Gymnasiast

== Bibliography ==
- Grange, William. Cultural Chronicle of the Weimar Republic. Scarecrow Press, 2008.
