= Because I Love You (1928 film) =

1928 film directed by Johannes Guter

- Directed by: Johannes Guter
- Written by: Gretel Heller; Martin Proskauer
- Produced by: Günther Stapenhorst
- Starring: Fritz Alberti; Suzy Vernon; Valerie Boothby
- Cinematography: Edgar S. Ziesemer
- Production company: UFA
- Distributed by: UFA
- Release date: 30 July 1928
- Country: Germany
- Languages: Silent; German intertitles

Because I Love You or The Dance Student (German: Der Tanzstudent) is a 1928 German silent romance film directed by Johannes Guter and starring Fritz Alberti, Suzy Vernon, and Valerie Boothby. It was shot at the Babelsberg Studios in Berlin. The film's sets were designed by the art director Jacek Rotmil.

== Cast ==
- Fritz Alberti as Eugen Buratti, Fabrikbesitzer
- Suzy Vernon as Ernesta, Burattis Tochter
- Valerie Boothby as Ina, Ernestas Kusine
- Willy Fritsch as Hans Amberg
- Carl Auen as Philipp Flemming
- Margit Manstad as Lona, ein Tanzmädel
- Albert Paulig as Ein Oberkellner
- Arthur Duarte as Charley, Saxophonist
- Gerhard Ritterband
- Else Reval
- Harry Grunwald
- Ita Rina

== Bibliography ==
- Bock, Hans-Michael; Bergfelder, Tim, eds. (2009). The Concise Cinegraph: Encyclopaedia of German Cinema. New York: Berghahn Books. ISBN 978-1-57181-655-9.
