= The Curse of Man =

1920 film by Richard Eichberg

- Directed by: Richard Eichberg
- Written by: William Merkel; Arthur Teuber
- Produced by: Richard Eichberg
- Starring: Béla Lugosi; Violetta Napierska; Lee Parry
- Cinematography: Joe Rive
- Production company: Richard Eichberg-Film
- Release date: 1920
- Country: Weimar Republic
- Language: Silent

The Curse of Man (German: Der Fluch der Menschheit, 1. Teil - Die Tochter der Arbeit) is a 1920 German film directed by Richard Eichberg and featuring Béla Lugosi, Violetta Napierska, and Lee Parry.

== Series ==
The Curse of Man was the first of a series of two films:

- The Curse of Man, original title in German: Der Fluch der Menschheit, 1. Teil - Die Tochter der Arbeit (meaning The Curse of Man, Part 1 - The Daughter of Labour)
- In the Ecstasy of Billions, original title in German: Der Fluch der Menschheit, 2. Teil - Im Rausche der Milliarden (meaning The Curse of Man, Part 2 - In the Ecstasy of Billions)

== Cast ==
- Lee Parry
- Violetta Napierska
- Robert Scholz
- Gustav Birkholz
- Willy Kaiser-Heyl
- Reinhold Pasch
- Alfred Schmasow
- Marga Köhler
- Felix Hecht
- Béla Lugosi – Reckless Saboteur

== See also ==
- Béla Lugosi filmography
