= The Living Propeller =

1921 film directed by Richard Eichberg

- Directed by: Richard Eichberg
- Written by: Helmuth Orthmann
- Produced by: Richard Eichberg
- Starring: Lee Parry; Aruth Wartan; Felix Hecht
- Cinematography: Paul Adler
- Production company: Richard Eichberg-Film
- Release date: 16 September 1921
- Country: Germany
- Languages: Silent; German intertitles

The Living Propeller (German: Der lebende Propeller) is a 1921 German silent drama film directed by Richard Eichberg and starring Lee Parry, Aruth Wartan and Felix Hecht.

The film's sets were designed by the art director Jacek Rotmil.

== Cast ==
- Lee Parry as Gaby, Grossnichte von Lord Robert Lyonel
- Aruth Wartan as Harry Lane, Artist
- Felix Hecht as Graf Wladimir Kosewski
- Max Wogritsch as Charles, Sohn von Lord Cecil
- Syme Delmar as Ellinor Kosewski
- Richard Georg as Bill Jackson, Artist
- Willy Kaiser-Heyl as Lord Robert Lyonel
- Josef Commer as Direktor des Tivoli Rosendaal, Amsterdam
- Ly Corder as Lucy
- Hardy von Francois as Lord Cecil, Herzog von Cunningham

== Bibliography ==
- Grange, William. Cultural Chronicle of the Weimar Republic. Scarecrow Press, 2008.
