= Ikarus, the Flying Man =

- Directed by: Carl Froelich
- Written by: Leo Heller
- Produced by: Karl Julius Fritzsche
- Starring: Ernst Hofmann; Esther Carena; Gustav Botz
- Cinematography: Hermann Boettger
- Production company: Neutral-Film
- Release date: 27 October 1918
- Running time: 95 minutes
- Country: Germany
- Languages: Silent; German intertitles

Ikarus, the Flying Man (German: Ikarus, der fliegende Mensch) is a 1918 German silent war film directed by Carl Froelich and starring Ernst Hofmann, Esther Carena and Gustav Botz. While a press screening was held in October 1918, during the final weeks of the First World War, it did not go on general release until the following July when it premiered at the Marmorhaus in Berlin.

The film's sets were designed by the art director Artur Günther. It was shot at the Tempelhof Studios in Berlin.

== Cast ==
- Gustav Botz as Günthers Father
- Esther Carena as Clemense de
- Olga Engl as Günthers Mother
- Ernst Hofmann as Günther Ellinghaus
- Heinz Sarnow
- Edith Sorel as Eriks

== Bibliography ==
- Bock, Hans-Michael & Bergfelder, Tim. The Concise CineGraph. Encyclopedia of German Cinema. Berghahn Books, 2009.
