= The Most Beautiful Woman in the World =

1924 film directed by Richard Eichberg

- Directed by: Richard Eichberg
- Written by: Hans Behrendt; Hugo Bettauer; Helmuth Orthmann
- Produced by: Richard Eichberg
- Starring: Lee Parry; Livio Pavanelli; Olaf Fjord
- Cinematography: Erich Grimmler; Heinrich Gärtner
- Production company: Richard Eichberg-Film
- Distributed by: Süd-Film
- Release date: 21 August 1924
- Country: Germany
- Languages: Silent; German intertitles

The Most Beautiful Woman in the World (German: Die schönste Frau der Welt) is a 1924 German silent film directed by Richard Eichberg and starring Lee Parry, Livio Pavanelli and Olaf Fjord. It premiered in Berlin at the Marmorhaus.

The film's sets were designed by the art directors Jacek Rotmil and Wilhelm Depenau. Location shooting took place at Amalfi in southern Italy.

== Cast ==
- Lee Parry
- Livio Pavanelli
- Olaf Fjord
- Inge Colette
- Mary Parker
- Georg Alexander
- Henry Bender
- Richard Eichberg

== Bibliography ==
- Bock, Hans-Michael & Bergfelder, Tim. The Concise CineGraph. Encyclopedia of German Cinema. Berghahn Books, 2009.
- Krautz, Alfred. International directory of cinematographers, set- and costume designers in film, Volume 4. Saur, 1984.
