= The Emperor's Sweetheart =

1931 film

- Directed by: Hans Tintner
- Written by: Emil Guttmann; Hans Tintner
- Based on: The Emperor's Sweetheart by Max Blau, Ernst Decsey and Alfred Steinberg-Frank
- Produced by: Robert Leistenschneider; Helmut Schreiber
- Starring: Liane Haid; Walter Janssen; Wilhelm Bendow
- Cinematography: Willy Winterstein
- Music by: Emil Berté
- Production company: Atlantis-Film
- Distributed by: Deutsche Fox
- Release date: 12 January 1931
- Running time: 82 minutes
- Country: Germany
- Language: German

The Emperor's Sweetheart (German: Kaiserliebchen) is a 1931 German historical musical comedy film directed by Hans Tintner and starring Liane Haid, Walter Janssen and Wilhelm Bendow. It was shot at the Grunewald Studios in Berlin. The film's sets were designed by the art director Max Heilbronner. An operetta film, it is based on the stage operetta of the same title composed by Emil Berté. It was distributed by the German branch of the American company Fox Film.

== Cast ==
- Liane Haid as Liesl, des Postmeisters Tochter
- Walter Janssen as Kaiser Josef
- Wilhelm Bendow as Rosenberg, Adjutant Kaiser Josefs
- Collette Jell as Jeanette, Prima-Ballerina
- Hans Jaray as Veilchen
- August Junker as Valentin, Hausmeister
- Attila Hörbiger as Josef Grundner, Postillon
- Olly Gebauer as Hilde, Liesels Freundin
- Liselotte Schaak as Zofe
- Henry Bender as Hofrat Sittenius
- Heinrich Heilinger as Bartel, Schmied
- Valy Arnheim as Fürst Clary
- Karl Elzer as Direktor des Burgtheaters
- Karl Harbacher as Sein Assistent
- Klaus Pohl as Friseur
- Georg H. Schnell as Hauptmann Erlaa
- Marian Alma as Bürgermeister von Wien
- Gertrud de Lalsky as Kaiserin Maria Theresia
- Ferdinand Martini as Liesls Vater

== Bibliography ==
- Giesen, Rolf. The Nosferatu Story: The Seminal Horror Film, Its Predecessors and Its Enduring Legacy. McFarland, 2019.
- Klaus, Ulrich J. Deutsche Tonfilme: Jahrgang 1931. Klaus-Archiv, 2006.
