= The Motorist Bride =

1925 film directed by Richard Eichberg

- Directed by: Richard Eichberg
- Written by: James Cox; Helmuth Orthmann
- Produced by: Richard Eichberg
- Starring: Hans Mierendorff; Lee Parry; Ernst Hofmann; Angelo Ferrari
- Cinematography: Erich Grimmler; Heinrich Gärtner
- Production company: Richard Eichberg-Film
- Distributed by: Süd-Film
- Release date: 22 January 1925
- Country: Germany
- Languages: Silent; German intertitles

The Motorist Bride (German: Die Motorbraut) is a 1925 German silent romance film directed by Richard Eichberg and starring Hans Mierendorff, Lee Parry and Ernst Hofmann. The film is notable for the use of Lilian Harvey as a stunt double for Parry during the mountaineering scenes shot in Switzerland. Harvey quickly graduated to become the top star of Richard Eichberg's production company.

It premiered at the Marmorhaus in Berlin on 22 January 1925. The film's art direction is by Jacek Rotmil.

== Cast ==
- Hans Mierendorff as Johann Amberg
- Lee Parry as Eva, seine Tochter
- Ernst Hofmann as Hans von Corell
- Angelo Ferrari as Frank Bruhn
- Sinaida Korolenko as Lili
- Max Grünberg as Heinz Ellhof
- Erwin van Roy as Gottlieb Daffke
- Hans Sturm as Gustav Briese
- Margarete Kupfer as Marta
- Gerhard Ritterband as Max
- Lilian Harvey as Eva (Stunt Double)

== Bibliography ==
- Ascheid, Antje (2010). Hitler's Heroines: Stardom and Womanhood in Nazi Cinema. Philadelphia: Temple University Press. ISBN 978-1-59213-843-2.
- Bock, Hans-Michael; Bergfelder, Tim, eds. (2009). The Concise Cinegraph: Encyclopaedia of German Cinema. New York: Berghahn Books. ISBN 978-1-57181-655-9.
- Grange, William (2008). Cultural Chronicle of the Weimar Republic. Lanham, MD: Scarecrow Press. ISBN 978-0-8108-5967-8.
