= The Woman with the World Record =

1927 film

- Die Frau mit dem Weltrekord
- Directed by: Erich Waschneck
- Written by: Jane Bess; Bobby E. Lüthge
- Produced by: Erich Waschneck
- Starring: Joop van Hulzen; Lee Parry; Henry Stuart
- Cinematography: Friedl Behn-Grund
- Music by: Pasquale Perris
- Production companies: Eiko Film; Erich Waschneck-Film
- Distributed by: National Film
- Release date: 7 October 1927
- Running time: 86 minutes
- Country: Germany
- Languages: Silent; German intertitles

The Woman with the World Record (German: Die Frau mit dem Weltrekord) is a 1927 German silent sports film directed by Erich Waschneck and starring Joop van Hulzen, Lee Parry and Henry Stuart. The film's sets were designed by the art director Robert A. Dietrich.

== Cast ==
- Joop van Hulzen as Dr. John Forbes
- Lee Parry as Lee, John's wife
- Henry Stuart as Will Carry, a sports patron
- Valerie Boothby as Mary, a world champion swimmer
- Hans Adalbert Schlettow as Tom Wobber, a manager
- Gerhard Ritterband as Robby, Tom's assistant
- Otto Kronburger as Peter Stanley, a friend of John and Lee

== Bibliography ==
- Grange, William. Cultural Chronicle of the Weimar Republic. Scarecrow Press, 2008.
