= Niniche (1925 film) =

1925 film

- Directed by: Victor Janson
- Written by: Robert Liebmann; Franz Rauch
- Starring: Ossi Oswalda; Vivian Gibson; Livio Pavanelli
- Cinematography: Willy Gaebel
- Music by: Bruno Schulz
- Production company: Westi Film
- Distributed by: Dewesti-Verleih
- Release date: 13 February 1925
- Country: Germany
- Languages: Silent; German intertitles

Niniche is a 1925 German silent comedy film directed by Victor Janson and starring Ossi Oswalda, Vivian Gibson and Livio Pavanelli.

The film's art direction was by Jacek Rotmil.

== Cast ==
- Ossi Oswalda as Niniche
- Victor Janson as Jonathan Dickson
- Livio Pavanelli as Harald Cliffton
- Vivian Gibson
- Gerhard Ritterband as Emil

== Bibliography ==
- Babett Stach & Helmut Morsbach. German film posters: 1895–1945. Walter de Gruyter, 1992.
