= Evelyn's Love Adventures =

1921 film directed by Richard Eichberg

- Directed by: Richard Eichberg
- Written by: Helmuth Orthmann
- Produced by: Richard Eichberg
- Starring: Lee Parry; Max Wogritsch; Aruth Wartan
- Cinematography: Paul Adler
- Production company: Richard Eichberg-Film
- Release date: 23 December 1921
- Country: Germany
- Languages: Silent; German intertitles

Evelyn's Love Adventures (German: Die Liebesabenteuer der schönen Evelyne) is a 1921 German silent thriller film directed by Richard Eichberg and starring Lee Parry, Max Wogritsch and Aruth Wartan.

The film's sets were designed by the art director Jacek Rotmil.

== Cast ==
- Lee Parry as Evelyne Burkhard
- Max Wogritsch as Walter Mautner, ihr Jugendfreund
- Aruth Wartan as Rolf Burkhard, Evelynes Bruder, lebt als Werner Haßfeld
- Felix Hecht as Dr. Helmuth Raimer
- Karl Falkenberg as Werner Haßfeld
- Syme Delmar as Margot Holmes, Haßfelds Braut
- Gerhard Ritterband as Bob
- Josef Commer
- Oskar Sima

== Bibliography ==
- Grange, William. Cultural Chronicle of the Weimar Republic. Scarecrow Press, 2008.
