= Anna Alt =

1945 film

- Film poster
- Directed by: Werner Klingler
- Written by: Harald G. Petersson
- Produced by: Conrad Flockner; Heinrich George
- Starring: Anneliese Uhlig; Will Quadflieg; Emil Lohkamp; Eugen Klöpfer
- Cinematography: Georg Bruckbauer
- Edited by: Ella Ensink
- Music by: Herbert Windt
- Production company: Tobis Film
- Distributed by: Deutsche Filmvertriebs
- Release date: 22 January 1945
- Running time: 95 minutes
- Country: Germany
- Language: German

Anna Alt (also known as Soloist Anna Alt, German: Solistin Anna Alt) is a 1945 German drama film directed by Werner Klingler. The movie stars Anneliese Uhlig, Will Quadflieg and Emil Lohkamp. The story follows a talented pianist who sacrifices her own career to support her husband's composing ambitions.

It was one of only twelve films released in Nazi Germany in 1945, due to increasing difficulties of film production during the later stages of the Second World War. It premiered at the Marmorhaus in Berlin.

== Cast ==
- Anneliese Uhlig as Anna Alt, the pianist
- Will Quadflieg as Joachim Alt, the composer
- Emil Lohkamp as Westberg, the music director
- Eugen Klöpfer as Prof. Burghardt
- Georg Thomalla as Heinz Wichert
- Ursula Grabley as Ida Wichert
- Charly Berger
- Robert Bürkner
- Gertrud de Lalsky
- Wolfgang Dohnberg
- Willy Kaiser-Heyl
- Albert Karchow
- Alfred Maack
- Josef Reithofer
- Ferdinand Robert
- Alfred Stein
- Alfred Stratmann
- Max Wilmsen
- Anneliese Würtz

== Bibliography ==
- Hake, Sabine (2001). Popular Cinema of the Third Reich. Austin: University of Texas Press. ISBN 978-0-292-73458-6.
- Raykoff, Ivan (2002). Dreams of Love: Mythologies of the Romantic Pianist in Twentieth-Century Popular Culture (PhD). University of California, San Diego. OCLC 51891318.
