= The Ones Down There =

1926 film

- Directed by: Victor Janson
- Written by: Heinrich Zille
- Starring: Maly Delschaft; Aud Egede-Nissen; Walter Rilla
- Cinematography: Carl Drews
- Music by: Giuseppe Becce
- Production company: Ungo-Film
- Release date: January 1926
- Country: Germany
- Languages: Silent; German intertitles

The Ones Down There (German: Die da unten) is a 1926 German silent film directed by Victor Janson and starring Maly Delschaft, Aud Egede-Nissen, and Walter Rilla.

The film's sets were designed by the art director Jacek Rotmil.

== Cast ==
- Aud Egede-Nissen as Ilse
- Walter Rilla as Andre
- Alfons Fryland as Dierks
- Victor Janson as Wilhelm
- Maly Delschaft
- Nikolai Malikoff
- Rosa Valetti
- Karl Victor Plagge
- Willy Kaiser-Heyl
- Hermann Picha
- Hedy Searle

== Bibliography ==
- Bock, Hans-Michael; Bergfelder, Tim, eds. (2009). The Concise Cinegraph: Encyclopaedia of German Cinema. New York: Berghahn Books. ISBN 978-1-57181-655-9.
