= Roses from the South (1926 film) =

1926 German silent romance film

- Directed by: Carl Froelich
- Written by: Hans Oberländer; Walter Supper
- Produced by: Carl Froelich; Henny Porten; Wilhelm von Kaufmann
- Starring: Henny Porten; Angelo Ferrari; Wilhelm Bendow; Hilde Wörner
- Cinematography: Axel Graatkjær
- Production companies: Henny Porten Film; Carl Froelich Film
- Distributed by: Filmhaus Bruckmann
- Release date: 11 March 1926
- Running time: 88 minutes
- Country: Germany
- Languages: Silent; German intertitles

Roses from the South (German: Rosen aus dem Süden) is a 1926 German silent romance film directed by Carl Froelich and starring Henny Porten, Angelo Ferrari and Wilhelm Bendow. Its title is a reference to the song "Rosen aus dem Süden" by Johann Strauss II. Art direction was by Franz Schroedter. The film premiered in Berlin on 11 March 1926.

== Cast ==
- Henny Porten as Dr. Eva Maron
- Angelo Ferrari as Dr. Hans Adam
- Wilhelm Bendow as Adolf Brinkmann
- Hilde Wörner as Anna Kruse
- Robert Scholz as Armand Laurence
- Jenny Marba as Die liebe Familie
- Sophie Pagay as Die liebe Familie
- Georg Baselt as Die liebe Familie
- Ernst Behmer as Die liebe Familie

== Bibliography ==
- Grange, William. Cultural Chronicle of the Weimar Republic. Scarecrow Press, 2008.
