= Hypnose: Sklaven fremden Willens =

1920 film directed by Richard Eichberg

Hypnose
- Directed by: Richard Eichberg
- Screenplay by: Carl Schneider
- Produced by: Richard Eichberg
- Starring: Gertrud de Lalsky; Lee Parry; Karl Halden; Bela Lugosi
- Cinematography: Joe Rive
- Production company: Eichberg-Film GmbH
- Release dates: 3 January 1920 (Schauburg-Lichtspiele, Berlin)
- Country: Germany

Hypnose: Sklaven fremden Willens (transl. Hypnosis: Slave of a Foreign Will) is a 1920 German silent film directed by Richard Eichberg. It was the first German production actor Bela Lugosi made in Germany, following Bruno Declari leaving Eichberg-Film to form his own production company.

Hypnose: Sklaven fremden Willens premiered at Schauburg-Lichtspiele in Berlin on 3 January 1920. Two weeks following its premiere, the film's title was cut down to just Sklaven fremden Willens due to the similarity of the film titled Hypnose starring Austrian mentalist and clairvoyant Erik Jan Hanussen

== Cast ==
- Lee Parry as Claire Raven
- Béla Lugosi as Professor Mors, the Hypnotist
- Gertrud de Lalsky
- Karl Halden as Wolf Woerner
- Marga Köhler as Frau Steffens
- Violetta Napierska as Eva Hain
- Rudolf Klein-Rhoden as Jack Weller
- Emil Rameau as Peter Hain
- Jenny Höhne as Frau Moran
- Gustav Birkholz as Senator Holbein

== Production ==
Actor Bela Lugosi arrived in Berlin in September 1919. According to Lugosi biographer Gary D. Rhodes and Bill Kaffenberger, Lugosi transitioned into the German film industry with ease as he had lived in the Hungarian and German side of his hometown Lugos. Several of Lugosi's Hungarian films were shown in Germany previously as well, including Az Ezredes (1918) and Az élet királya (1918).

Director Richard Eichberg who headed Eichberg-Film created films with actor Bruno Declari. As Declari had created his own film company in mid-1919, Eichberg required a new star. In the 1920 German publication Film Magazin, Lugosi's brief biography states that Declari leaving opened the door to Lugosi. Lugosi's first film for Eichberg was Hypnose: Sklaven fremden Willens.

== Release and reception ==
Hypnose: Sklaven fremden Willens premiered at Schauburg-Lichtspiele in Berlin on January 3, 1920. A review in Film-Kurier, a critic stated the film is "totally suspenseful and reflects the most outstanding film technology using all the means at its disposal." while "it would be helped by applying the 'editor's scissors,' reducing the 6 acts to just 5." The review went on to praise Lee Parry who "performs exquisitely and her dress is refined in taste" and Lugosi who "is a welcome newcomer - he possess decided talent, but must guard against exaggeration."

Within two weeks of the films premiere, the film's title was changed to just Sklaven fremden Willens due to the similarity of the film titled Hypnose starring Austrian mentalist and clairvoyant Erik Jan Hanussen.

== See also ==
- Béla Lugosi filmography
