= The Stranger from Elster Street =

1921 film

- Directed by: Alfred Tostary
- Written by: Demy Passau
- Starring: Margit Barnay; Olaf Storm; Eduard von Winterstein; Maria Forescu
- Cinematography: Curt Courant
- Production company: Olaf-Film
- Distributed by: Globus-Film
- Release date: 7 June 1921
- Country: Germany
- Languages: Silent; German intertitles

The Stranger from Elster Street (German: Die Fremde aus der Elstergasse) is a 1921 German silent drama film directed by Alfred Tostary and starring Margit Barnay, Olaf Storm and Eduard von Winterstein. It premiered in Berlin on 7 June 1921.

== Cast ==
- Margit Barnay
- Olaf Storm
- Eduard von Winterstein
- Maria Forescu
- Ilka Grüning
- Frida Richard
- Wilhelm Diegelmann
- Georg John
- Hermann Picha
- Josefine Dora
- Emil Mamelok
- Harry Gondi
- Berta Christians-Klein

== Bibliography ==
- Grange, William. Cultural Chronicle of the Weimar Republic. Scarecrow Press, 2008.
