= Artur Guttmann =

Austrian composer

Artur Guttmann (27 August 1891 in Vienna – 3 September 1945 in Hollywood, Los Angeles) was an Austrian-Jewish film score composer.

== Selected filmography ==
- The Son of the Sheik (1926), as Arthur H. Gutman
- Maytime (1926)
- The Bordellos of Algiers (1927)
- Men Before Marriage (1927)
- The Csardas Princess (1927)
- Fabulous Lola (1927)
- The Trial of Donald Westhof (1927)
- The Old Fritz (1928)
- Herkules Maier (1928)
- Guilty (1928)
- Love and Thieves (1928)
- The Girl from the Revue (1928)
- Looping the Loop (1928)
- Scandal in Baden-Baden (1929)
- The Man with the Frog (1929)
- My Heart is a Jazz Band (1929)
- The Burning Heart (1929)
- Marriage (1929)
- Foolishness of His Love (1929)
- Autobus Number Two (1929)
- Phantoms of Happiness (1930)
- Echo of a Dream (1930)
- Love Songs (1930)
- Rendezvous (1930)
- Susanne Cleans Up (1930)
- Love in the Ring (1930)
- The Waltz King (1930)
- The Prosecutor Hallers (1930)
- The Other (1930)
- My Wife's Teacher (1930)
- Without Meyer, No Celebration is Complete (1931)
- Danton (1931)
- Grock (1931)
- Salto Mortale (1931)
- Terror of the Garrison (1931)
- Duty Is Duty (1931)
- The True Jacob (1931)
- My Cousin from Warsaw (1931)
- A Waltz by Strauss (1931)
- Road to Rio (1931)
- No Money Needed (1932)
- The Ringer (1932)
- Scampolo (1932)
- The Happiness of Grinzing (1933)
- Everything for the Company (1935)
- Fräulein Lilli (1936)
- I Take This Woman (1940)
- Enemy of Women (1944)

== Bibliography ==
- Prawer, S.S. Between Two Worlds: The Jewish Presence in German and Austrian Film, 1910-1933. Berghahn Books, 2007.
