= In the Ecstasy of Billions (1920 film) =

1920 film directed by Richard Eichberg

- Directed by: Richard Eichberg
- Written by: William Merkel; Arthur Teuber
- Produced by: Richard Eichberg
- Starring: Béla Lugosi
- Cinematography: Joe Rive
- Release date: 23 September 1920
- Country: Weimar Republic
- Language: Silent

In the Ecstasy of Billions (German: Der Fluch der Menschheit, 2. Teil - Im Rausche der Milliarden) is a 1920 German film directed by Richard Eichberg and featuring Béla Lugosi and Violetta Napierska. It was a sequel to The Curse of Man.

== Cast ==
- Lee Parry
- Violetta Napierska
- Felix Hecht
- Robert Scholz
- Willy Kaiser-Heyl
- Reinhold Pasch
- Béla Lugosi
- Paul Ludwig
- Dary Holm
