= Off the Rails (1921 film) =

1921 film

- Directed by: William Karfiol
- Written by: Hans Hyan (novel); William Karfiol
- Starring: Wilhelm Diegelmann; Ernst Hofmann; Erra Bognar
- Cinematography: Heinrich Gärtner
- Production company: Martin Dentler-Film
- Release date: 16 June 1921
- Country: Germany
- Languages: Silent; German intertitles

Off the Rails (German: Entgleist) is a 1921 German silent drama film directed by William Karfiol and starring Wilhelm Diegelmann, Ernst Hofmann and Erra Bognar. The film's sets were designed by the art director Eduard Nickler. It premiered at the Marmorhaus in Berlin.

== Cast ==
- Wilhelm Diegelmann as Wachtmeister a.d. Heilberg
- Ernst Hofmann as Hans Heilberg
- Erra Bognar as Else Heilberg
- Martha Angerstein-Licho
- Charly Berger as Steuermann
- Tessi Nurnberg as Elses Freundin
- Josef Commer
- Colette Corder
- Marie Louise Jürgens
- Adolf E. Licho
- Heinrich Peer

== Bibliography ==
- Alfred Krautz. International directory of cinematographers, set- and costume designers in film, Volume 4. Saur, 1984.
