= Autobus Number Two =

1929 film

- German: Autobus Nr. 2
- Directed by: Max Mack
- Written by: Alfred Schirokauer
- Starring: Fritz Kampers; Lee Parry; Georg Alexander
- Cinematography: Bruno Mondi
- Music by: Artur Guttmann
- Production company: Terra Film
- Distributed by: Terra Film
- Release date: 15 September 1929
- Country: Germany
- Languages: Silent; German intertitles

Autobus Number Two (German: Autobus Nr. 2) is a 1929 German silent comedy film directed by Max Mack and starring Fritz Kampers, Lee Parry, and Georg Alexander. It was shot at the Terra Studios in Berlin. The film's art direction was by Bruno Lutz and Stephen Welcke.

== Cast ==
- Fritz Kampers as Fritz Marunge, bus conductor
- Lee Parry as Hanne, his wife
- Marion Mirimanian as Christine, their child
- Georg Alexander as Lawyer Dr. Ponsar
- Elza Temary as Vicky
- Jakob Tiedtke as Jakob, Dr. Ponsar's assistant
- Sylvia Torf as the inspector's wife
- Lore Braun as Anni
- Ernõ Szenes as commissioner
