= Sins of the Parents (1919 film) =

1919 film directed by Richard Eichberg

- Directed by: Richard Eichberg
- Written by: Arthur Teuber
- Produced by: Richard Eichberg
- Starring: Lee Parry; Bruno Decarli; Violetta Napierska
- Cinematography: Joe Rive
- Production company: Richard Eichberg-Film
- Distributed by: Central-Film-Vertriebs
- Release date: 1919
- Country: Germany
- Languages: Silent; German intertitles

Sins of the Parents (German: Sünden der Eltern) is a 1919 German silent film directed by Richard Eichberg and starring Lee Parry, Bruno Decarli and Violetta Napierska.

The film's sets were designed by the art director Willi Herrmann.

== Cast ==
- Lee Parry
- Bruno Decarli as Portierssohn Karlemann
- Violetta Napierska as Bankierstochter Jutta Sternheim
- Rudolf Klein-Rhoden
- Carl Gerhard Schröder
- Frau Thumser-Einödshofer
- Karl Halden
- Edmund Löwe
- Emil Rameau
- Trude Kurtze
- Frau Lehndorf-Schöttle
- Felix Hecht

== Bibliography ==
- Alfred Krautz. International directory of cinematographers, set- and costume designers in film, Volume 4. Saur, 1984.
