= The Ship of Lost Souls =

1929 film directed by Maurice Tourneur

- Directed by: Maurice Tourneur
- Written by: Franzos Keremen (novel); Maurice Tourneur
- Produced by: Max Glass
- Starring: Fritz Kortner; Marlene Dietrich; Robin Irvine
- Cinematography: Nicolas Farkas
- Production company: Max Glass Film
- Distributed by: Messtro-Film
- Release date: 17 September 1929
- Running time: 121 minutes
- Country: Germany
- Languages: Silent; German intertitles

The Ship of Lost Souls or The Ship of Lost Men (German: Das Schiff der verlorenen Menschen) is a 1929 German silent thriller film directed by Maurice Tourneur and starring Fritz Kortner, Marlene Dietrich and Robin Irvine.

It was Dietrich's last silent film before The Blue Angel made her an international star. It was shot at the Staaken Studios in Berlin, and partly on location around Rostock. The film's sets were designed by the art directors Franz Schroedter and Fritz Maurischat. It premièred on 17 September 1929 at the Ufa-Pavillon am Nollendorfplatz in Berlin.

== Cast ==
- Fritz Kortner as Kapitän Vela - Captain Fernando Vela
- Marlene Dietrich as Ethel Marley
- Robin Irvine as William 'T.W.' Cheyne - a Young American Doctor
- Vladimir Sokoloff as Grischa - der Koch - the Cook
- Gaston Modot as Der Sträfling Morains - Morain - the Escaped Convict
- Boris de Fast as Der tätowierte - The Tattooed Sailor
- Feodor Chaliapin Jr. as Nick
- Max Maximilian as Tom Butley
- Fritz Alberti as Der Kapitän - The Captain of the Luxury Liner L'Amorique
- Robert Garrison as Der Vermieter - The Landlord
- Heinrich Gotho as Ein Matrose - A Sailor
- Harry Grunwald an Ein Matrose - A Sailor
- Emil Heyse
- Fred Immler
- Alfred Loretto as Ein Matrose - A Sailor
- Gerhard Ritterband
- Aruth Wartan
- Heinz Wemper
- Christiane Tourneur

== Bibliography ==
- Waldman, Harry. Maurice Tourneur: The Life and Films. McFarland, 2001.
- Wood, Ean. Divine Dietrich: Venus in Tails. Sanctuary, 2002.
