= The Woman with That Certain Something =

1925 film directed by Erich Schönfelder

- German: Die Frau mit dem Etwas
- Directed by: Erich Schönfelder
- Written by: Hans Behrendt; Helmuth Orthmann
- Produced by: Richard Eichberg
- Starring: Rudolf Lettinger; Lee Parry; Bruno Kastner
- Cinematography: Heinrich Gartner; Bruno Mondi
- Production company: Richard Eichberg-Film
- Distributed by: Süd-Film
- Release date: 27 August 1925
- Running time: 76 minutes
- Country: Germany
- Languages: Silent; German intertitles

The Woman with That Certain Something (German: Die Frau mit dem Etwas) is a 1925 German silent comedy film directed by Erich Schönfelder and starring Rudolf Lettinger, Lee Parry and Bruno Kastner. It was shot at the Johannisthal Studios in Berlin. The film's sets were designed by the art director Kurt Richter.

== Cast ==
- Rudolf Lettinger as Walter Zug
- Lee Parry as Lu
- Bruno Kastner as Felix Müller
- Fritz Schulz as Gustav Lenz
- Dina Gralla as Erna Steinke
- Margarete Kupfer as Lieschen Klumpp, the widow
- Wilhelm Bendow as Günther Brandt
- Hans Sturm as Don Miguel di Calvarezzo
- Robert Garrison as Jean Manulescu
- Hugo Werner-Kahle as a tattooed gentleman
- Josef Commer as Der Gemeindevorsteher
- Hermann Picha as Piefke
- Karl Harbacher as Pafke
- Trude Hesterberg
