= Lord Reginald's Derby Ride =

1924 film

- Directed by: Arthur Teuber
- Written by: Paul Günther
- Starring: Ralph Arthur Roberts; Fritz Kampers
- Cinematography: Heinrich Gärtner
- Production company: Osmania-Film
- Release date: 17 January 1924
- Country: Germany
- Languages: Silent; German intertitles

Lord Reginald's Derby Ride (German: Lord Reginalds Derbyritt) is a 1924 German silent comedy film directed by Arthur Teuber and starring Ralph Arthur Roberts and Fritz Kampers.

== Cast ==
- Ernst Hofmann
- Uschi Elleot
- Jutta Jol
- Ralph Arthur Roberts
- Karl Platen
- Rudolf Klein-Rohden
- Wilhelm Kaiser-Heyl
- Fritz Kampers

== Bibliography ==
- Alfred Krautz. International directory of cinematographers, set- and costume designers in film, Volume 4. Saur, 1984.
