= The Copper (1930 film) =

1930 film by Richard Eichberg

- German: Der Greifer
- Directed by: Richard Eichberg
- Written by: Curt J. Braun; Rudolph Cartier; Max Ehrlich; Egon Eis; Victor Kendall; Géza von Cziffra
- Produced by: Richard Eichberg
- Starring: Hans Albers; Charlotte Susa; Margot Landa
- Cinematography: Heinrich Gärtner; Bruno Mondi
- Music by: Hans May
- Production companies: British International Pictures; Richard Eichberg-Film
- Distributed by: Süd-Film
- Release date: 17 September 1930
- Running time: 82 minutes
- Countries: Germany; United Kingdom
- Language: German

The Copper, or The Grasper (German: Der Greifer), is a 1930 British-German crime film directed by Richard Eichberg and starring Hans Albers, Charlotte Susa, and Margot Landa. It is the German-language version of the British film Night Birds, which was also directed by Eichberg but with an English-speaking cast, and which was released in the USA under the title Nacht-Bummler by Columbia Pictures Corp. Both films were made by British International Pictures at their Elstree Studios at a time when such multiple-language versions were common.

It was a success in Germany, launching Albers as a major star. In 1958, the film was remade with Albers reprising his role.

== Plot ==
Scotland Yard's Sergeant Harry Cross is investigating a brazen robbery at a London mansion in which the guests at a large dinner party were robbed of all their jewelry and valuables. A servant was stabbed to death with a throwing knife. Sergeant Cross and Chief Inspector Warrington immediately suspect Knife Jack and his gang to be behind the robbery-murder. For some time now, they have been terrifying the residents of London with their brutal acts.

A five-pound gaming chip found at the scene leads Cross to the Palermo nightclub. He suspects that the chip came from a gaming operation run in a backroom of the club. He asks around there and has a run-in with Toothpick Jeff and Whiskey Dick, who do not appreciate his presence while playing cards. As Cross turns his back to their table, a throwing knife flies just past him into the door frame. The knife is similar to the throwing knives used by Knife Jack. The knife thrower escapes undetected via a balcony. Cross then threatens nightclub owner Snorry to raid and shut down his joint if he doesn't name the knife thrower by the following night. At the nightclub, Cross meets singer Dolly Mooreland, who performs both at the nightclub and in a popular revue at the Coliseum theater. He thinks she is an accomplice of the gang and tries to get closer to her in a charming way. Cross is correct in his assumption. When she later enters her house, Toothpick Jeff and Whiskey Dick are already waiting there and discussing what to do about Cross.

Inspector Sinclair, who has returned to London after three years in Canada, is also investigating the case. He was unrecognized at the Palermo the night before when Cross met Dolly Mooreland there. At Scotland Yard he meets Alice, Cross's wife, who reacts a little jealously to her husband's professional acquaintances with women. She asks Sinclair if she could visit the nightclub sometime. He replies: "But only with an escort!" Cross now suspects that another robbery by Knife Jack's gang is to take place during the revue performance in the Coliseum Theater that evening. He goes to the theater unrecognized and ties up Dolly's singing partner in the dressing room. Wearing the singer's costume, he enters the stage with a daring jump. After a brief singing performance and another jump into a box where Jeff and Dick are waiting for the robbery to begin, Cross is able to thwart the criminals' plan. After a chase through the theater, the perpetrators escape over the rooftops of London.

In the further course of the evening, those involved meet in the Palermo nightclub. Inspector Sinclair arrives with Alice Cross. Dolly Moorehead dances with Josef Huber, who was planted in the Palermo as a spy by Inspector Sinclair. Jeff and Dick are also among the guests. In a side room, Sinclair and Alice meet Josef Huber, who discovered Knife Jack's identity during his assignment in the Palermo. Before he can tell them the name, he falls unconscious after drinking a whisky. Sinclair and Alice assume he is dead and exit the room, Sinclair locking the door. When Warrington arrives shortly thereafter, the supposed corpse has disappeared. The employees of the Palermo unanimously claim that Josef Huber left the room and the nightclub, albeit heavily intoxicated. Sinclair then arrests Dolly.

Cross believes the arrest to be a gross tactical error and asks Warrington for complete freedom to solve the case. Meanwhile they have learned that Josef Huber drowned in the Thames, with no signs of poisoning found on him. Dolly is released from custody by Cross. He follows her to lead him to Knife Jack. Arriving in the basement of the closed Palermo nightclub, she finds Jeff, Dick and Knife Jack, whose identity is initially hidden from the viewer. Knife Jack suspects her release is a ruse and Cross is already on their trail. Jeff and Dick then leave the nightclub. A short time later, Cross appears and realizes that the nightclub owner is Snorry Knife Jack. A bitter fight ensues in the guest room of the empty Palermo. Cross manages to subdue Jack and Dolly. The arriving police led by Chief Inspector Warrington are able to arrest both of them.

== Cast ==
- Hans Albers as Sgt. Harry Cross
- Charlotte Susa as Dolly Mooreland
- Margot Landa as Alice Cross
- Karl Ludwig Diehl as Snorry
- Eugen Burg as Chief Insp. Warrington
- Harry Hardt as Insp. Sinclair
- Hermann Blaß as Prater-Pepi
- Erich Schönfelder as Barker
- John Mylong as Zahnstocher-Jeff
- Hugo Fischer-Köppe as Whisky-Dick
- Milo de Sabo as Tänzer-Jonny
- Senta Söneland as Frau im Gefängnis
- Hertha von Walther as Flossie
- Wera Engels as Mabel
- Leo Monosson as Stimmungssänger
- Charlie Roellinghoff as Hausherr
- Lotte Stein as Hausfrau
- Peggy White as Zigarettenmädchen
