= The Lady in Black (1920 film) =

1920 film

- Directed by: Victor Janson
- Written by: Curt Goetz
- Produced by: Paul Davidson
- Starring: Curt Goetz; Hugo Falke; Willy Kaiser-Heyl
- Cinematography: Willy Gaebel
- Production company: PAGU
- Distributed by: UFA
- Release date: October 1920
- Country: Germany
- Languages: Silent; German intertitles

The Lady in Black (German:Die Dame in Schwarz) is a 1920 German silent crime film directed by Victor Janson and starring Curt Goetz, Hugo Falke and Willy Kaiser-Heyl. It features the popular detective hero Joe Deebs.

The film's sets were designed by the art director Kurt Richter.

== Cast ==
- Curt Goetz as Joe Deebs, Detektiv
- Hugo Falke as Graf von Falkenhorst
- Willy Kaiser-Heyl as Pastor Jürgens
- Max Kronert as Deebs Diener
- Josef Rehberger as Graf Falkenhorsts indischer Diener
- Magnus Stifter as Gutsbesitzer Rittmeister Vallentin
- Gertrude Welcker as Gräfin Katja von Falkenhorst

== Bibliography ==
- Bock, Hans-Michael & Bergfelder, Tim. The Concise CineGraph. Encyclopedia of German Cinema. Berghahn Books, 2009.
