= Your Valet =

1922 film

- Directed by: Willy Achsel
- Starring: Erika Glässner; Gerhard Ritterband; Karl Günther
- Cinematography: Willy Hameister
- Production company: Terra Film
- Distributed by: Terra Film
- Release date: 24 February 1922
- Country: Germany
- Languages: Silent; German intertitles

Your Valet (German: Ihr Kammerdiener) is a 1922 German silent film directed by Willy Achsel and starring Erika Glässner, Gerhard Ritterband, and Karl Günther.

The film's sets were designed by the art director Carl Ludwig Kirmse.

== Cast ==
- Erika Glässner as Nell Spoorer
- Gerhard Ritterband as Fix, Spoorers Assistant
- Karl Günther as Roger Forester
- Kurt Busch as Dr. Joel Smart
- Rolf Jäger as Archibald Teddyson
- Hugo Döblin as Reporter
- Carl Geppert as Klubdiener
