= Olaf Storm =

German actor (1894–1931)

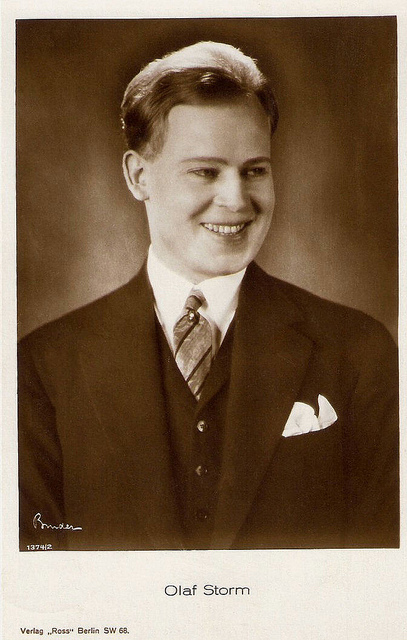
- Born: 10 January 1894; Richterich, German Empire
- Died: March 1931 (aged 37); Berlin, Germany
- Occupation: Film actor
- Years active: 1919–1927

Olaf Storm, pseudonym of Kurt Theodor von Kann (10 January 1894 – 11 or 12 March 1931) was a German film actor of the silent era. Storm was a star of early German cinema, playing the lead in films such as The Stranger from Alster Street and had his own production company Olaf Film. He also appeared in supporting roles in The Last Laugh and Metropolis.

== Selected filmography ==
- Nat Pinkerton in the Fight (1920)
- Your Brother's Wife (1921)
- From the Files of a Respectable Woman (1920)
- Begierde (1921)
- The Stranger from Alster Street (1921)
- Miss Julie (1922)
- The Moneylender's Daughter (1922)
- Girl of the Berlin Streets (1922)
- The Voice of the Heart (1924)
- The Last Laugh (1924)
- False Shame (1926)
- Weekend Magic (1927)
- Metropolis (1927)
- Forbidden Love (1927)

== Bibliography ==
- Grange, William. Cultural Chronicle of the Weimar Republic.Scarecrow Press, 2008.
- Rhodes, Gary Don. Lugosi: His Life in Films, on Stage, and in the Hearts of Horror Lovers. McFarland, 2006.
