= The Einstein Theory of Relativity =

1923 film

- Directed by: Dave Fleischer
- Production company: Fleischer Studios
- Release date: 1923
- Running time: 20 minutes
- Country: United States
- Language: Silent

The Einstein Theory of Relativity (1923) is a silent animated short film directed by Dave Fleischer and released by Fleischer Studios.

== History ==
In August 1922, Scientific American published an article explaining their position that a silent film would be unsuccessful in presenting the theory of relativity to the general public, arguing that only as part of a broader educational package including lecture and text would such film be successful. Scientific American then went on to review frames from an unnamed German film reported to be financially successful.

Six months later, on February 8, 1923, the Fleischers released their relativity film, produced in collaboration with popular science journalist Garrett P. Serviss to accompany his book on the same topic. Two versions of the Fleischer film are reported to exist – a shorter two-reel (20 minute) edit intended for general theater audiences, and a longer five-reel (50 minute) version intended for educational use.

The Fleischers lifted footage from the German predecessor, Die Grundlagen der Einsteinschen Relativitäts-Theorie, directed by Hanns-Walter Kornblum, for inclusion into their film. Presented here are images from the Fleischer film and German film. If actual footage was not recycled into The Einstein Theory of Relativity, these images and text from the Scientific American article suggest that original visual elements from the German film were.

This film, like much of the Fleischer's work, has fallen into the public domain. Unlike Fleischer Studio's Superman or Betty Boop cartoons, The Einstein Theory of Relativity has very few existing prints and is available in 16mm from only a few specialized film preservation organizations.
