= Women of Luxury =

1925 film by Erich Schönfelder

- Directed by: Erich Schönfelder
- Written by: Olga Alsen; Helmuth Orthmann
- Produced by: Richard Eichberg
- Starring: Lee Parry; Hans Albers; Rudolf Lettinger
- Cinematography: Heinrich Gärtner
- Production company: Richard Eichberg-Film
- Distributed by: Süd-Film
- Release date: 20 April 1925
- Country: Germany
- Languages: Silent; German intertitles

Women of Luxury (German: Luxusweibchen) is a 1925 German silent comedy film directed by Erich Schönfelder and starring Lee Parry, Hans Albers and Rudolf Lettinger. It was made at the Johannisthal Studios near Berlin. The film's sets were designed by the art directors Jacek Rotmil and Siegfried Wroblewsky.

== Cast ==
- Lee Parry as Harriet von Randow
- Hans Albers as Kurt von Randow
- Rudolf Lettinger as Hermann von Benthien
- Olaf Fjord as Wolfgang Rainer
- Lia Eibenschütz as Lissy Rainer
- Robert Garrison as Ludwig Moser
- Lydia Potechina as Ellen Moser
- Iwa Wanja as Karla Moser
- Gertrud von Hoschek as Daisy Moser
- Julius Falkenstein as Enver Kiral-Bey
- Hans Junkermann as Otto von Brenken
- Paul Ludwig
- Werner Pittschau

== Bibliography ==
- Ganeva, Mila . Women in Weimar Fashion: Discourses and Displays in German Culture, 1918–1933. Camden House, 2008.
