= Girl of the Berlin Streets =

1922 film directed by Richard Eichberg

- Directed by: Richard Eichberg
- Written by: Helmuth Orthmann
- Produced by: Richard Eichberg
- Starring: Lee Parry; Aruth Wartan; Fritz Bernhardt
- Edited by: Olaf Storm
- Production company: Richard Eichberg-Film
- Release date: 30 April 1922
- Country: Germany
- Languages: Silent; German intertitles

Girl of the Berlin Streets (German: Das Straßenmädchen von Berlin) is a 1922 German silent drama film directed by Richard Eichberg and starring Lee Parry, Aruth Wartan and Fritz Bernhardt.

== Cast ==
- Lee Parry as Anna Hartou
- Aruth Wartan
- Fritz Bernhardt
- Gerhard Ritterband
- Max Wogritsch
- Olaf Storm as Baron Axel von Rhode
- Josef Commer
- Willy Kaiser-Heyl

== Bibliography ==
- Grange, William. Cultural Chronicle of the Weimar Republic. Scarecrow Press, 2008.
