= Die Grundlagen der Einsteinschen Relativitäts-Theorie =

1922 film

- Directed by: Hanns Walter Kornblum
- Release date: 2 April 1922 (Germany)
- Country: Germany
- Languages: Silent film; German intertitles

Die Grundlagen der Einsteinschen Relativitäts-Theorie (English: The Fundamentals of the Einsteinian Relativity Theory) is a 1922 German partly animated documentary film created with the goal of bringing Einstein's theory of relativity to the broad public. It premiered on 2 April 1922 at the Frankfurt Fair.

With more than 80,000 individual images, it is not only the first great science film, it is also the film with the longest trick sequences. The film's running time was between two and three hours, depending on the length of the commentaries made by the scientific presenter. While the original version of the film is lost, part of the film (around 20 minutes) was used to create Max Fleischer's film The Einstein Theory of Relativity from 1923.
