= The Moneylender's Daughter =

1922 film directed by Fritz Bernhardt

- Directed by: Fritz Bernhardt
- Written by: Helmuth Orthmann
- Produced by: Richard Eichberg
- Starring: Lee Parry; Max Wogritsch; Olaf Storm
- Production company: Richard Eichberg-Film
- Release date: 8 September 1922
- Country: Germany
- Languages: Silent; German intertitles

The Moneylender's Daughter (German: Die Tochter des Wucherers) is a 1922 German silent film directed by Fritz Bernhardt and starring Lee Parry, Max Wogritsch and Olaf Storm.

== Cast ==
- Lee Parry as Thoea Nothmer
- Max Wogritsch as Graf Lothar von Rüstow
- Olaf Storm as Dr. Kurt Holgers
- Josef Commer as Pank Feldern, Agent
- Syme Delmar as Irene Hansen
- Rudolf Klein-Rhoden as Bankier Michael Bothmer
- Paul Ludwig as Franz Scherneck
- Gerhard Ritterband as Sepp Hinterwurzer
- Aruth Wartan as Heino Bothmer

== Bibliography ==
- Bock, Hans-Michael & Bergfelder, Tim. The Concise CineGraph. Encyclopedia of German Cinema. Berghahn Books, 2009.
