= Ihre Hoheit die Tänzerin (film) =

1922 film directed by Richard Eichberg

- Directed by: Richard Eichberg
- Starring: Lee Parry; Robert Scholz; Bela Lugosi
- Release date: 10 November 1922
- Country: Weimar Republic
- Language: Silent

Ihre Hoheit die Tänzerin (Her Highness the Dancer) is a 1922 German silent film directed by Richard Eichberg and featuring Bela Lugosi.

The film was originally banned by the Film Review Office for quite some time: it was not permitted to be shown in the Weimar Republic. The filmmakers appealed, but the Office considered the film "corruptive" and the appeal was rejected A shortened version was again not approved. Finally on 16 January 1923 a version of the film, now retitled Der Leidensweg der Eva Grunwald (The Ordeal of Eva Grunwald) was approved, considered suitable for adults only. This approved version consisted of five acts and totaled 1,887 meters of film, compared to the original's six acts and 1,995 meters.

Lugosi left Germany for the United States in October, 1920, so if he was indeed in this film, it had to have been filmed in 1920, but most sources list it as a 1922 film, probably because it took so long for the film to be approved by the German censors.

== Cast ==
- Lee Parry as Eva Grunwald
- Eduard Rothauser as Herrmann Grunwald, glockner of St Mary's
- Aruth Wartan as Gadvan
- Syme Delmar as Ruth Irving
- Rudolf Zolling as Organist of St Mary's
- Max Wogritsch as Wolfgang Tautlingen
- Walter Steinbeck as Lord Cecil Gloster
- Paul Ludwig as Coppers, Lord Cecil's secretary
- Robert Scholz
- Violetta Napierska
- Bela Lugosi
- Chief Tahachee as German Man (uncredited)
