= Willy Kaiser-Heyl =

German actor

- Born: 4 August 1876; Frankfurt, German Empire
- Died: 2 December 1953 (aged 77); Berlin, Germany
- Occupation: Actor
- Years active: 1919–1952

Willy Kaiser-Heyl (4 August 1876 – 2 December 1953) was a German film actor. He appeared in 92 films between 1919 and 1952. He was born in Frankfurt, Germany and died in Berlin.

== Selected filmography ==
- The Tragedy of a Great (1920)
- Im Rausche der Milliarden (1920)
- Der Janus-Kopf (1920)
- The Lady in Black (1920)
- Die Fluch der Menschheit (1920)
- My Wife's Diary (1920)
- At War in the Diamond Fields (1921)
- The Living Propeller (1921)
- The Secrets of Berlin (1921)
- A Debt of Honour (1921)
- The Favourite of the Queen (1922)
- Fratricide (1922)
- Girl of the Berlin Streets (1922)
- Frauenmoral (1923)
- The Affair of Baroness Orlovska (1923)
- Count Cohn (1923)
- The Fifth Street (1923)
- The Vice of Gambling (1923)
- The Sensational Trial (1923)
- I Had a Comrade (1923)
- Lord Reginald's Derby Ride (1924)
- The Voice of the Heart (1924)
- Wunder der Schöpfung (1925)
- Neptune Bewitched (1925)
- Destiny (1925)
- The King and the Girl (1925)
- The Telephone Operator (1925)
- The Ones Down There (1926)
- The False Prince (1927)
- Fire in the Opera House (1930)
- Marriage in Name Only (1930)
- Him or Me (1930)
- Cruiser Emden (1932)
- Anna and Elizabeth (1933)
- Music in the Blood (1934)
- The Empress's Favourite (1936)
- Paul and Pauline (1936)
- Napoleon Is to Blame for Everything (1938)
- Nanon (1938)
- Robert Koch (1939)
- Cadets (1939)
- In the Name of the People (1939)
- Target in the Clouds (1939)
- Anna Alt (1945)
