= Monna Vanna (1922 film) =

1922 film directed by Richard Eichberg

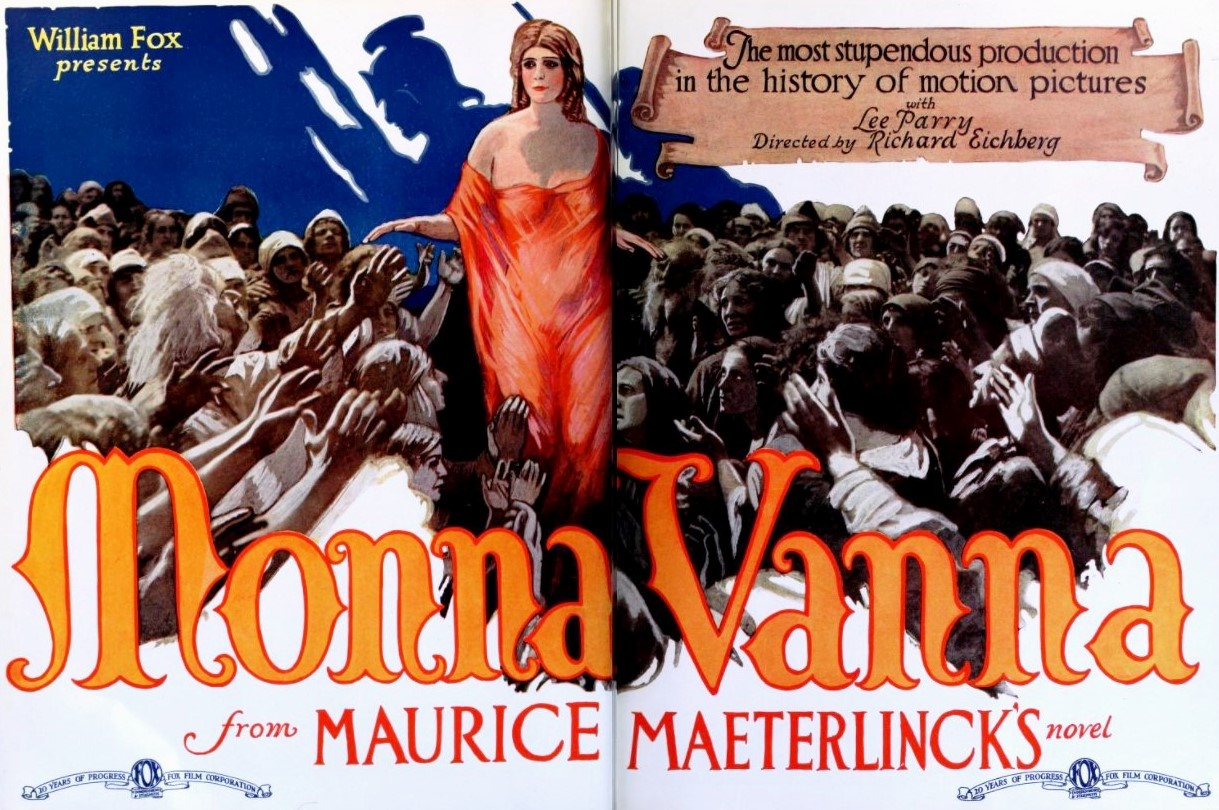
- American advertisement
- Directed by: Richard Eichberg
- Written by: Niccolò Machiavelli (story); Maurice Maeterlinck (play); Olga Alsen; Helmuth Orthmann
- Starring: Lee Parry; Paul Wegener; Hans Sturm
- Cinematography: Paul Adler; Erich Grimmler; Max Lutze; Franz Planer; Georg Schubert
- Music by: Cancio Millán
- Production companies: Bavaria Film; Fox Film Corporation
- Distributed by: Bavaria Film
- Release date: 21 December 1922
- Country: Germany
- Languages: Silent; German intertitles

Monna Vanna is a 1922 German silent historical film directed by Richard Eichberg and starring Lee Parry, Paul Wegener, and Hans Sturm.

The film is based on the play Monna Vanna by Maurice Maeterlinck which itself drew on story by the sixteenth century writer Niccolò Machiavelli. It was made at the Emelka Studios near Munich as part of a deal Eichberg had struck with Bavaria Film. Some filming also took place at the Johannisthal Studios in Berlin. The film's sets were designed by the art directors Willy Reiber, Jacek Rotmil and Kurt Richter.

== Cast ==
- Lee Parry as Madonna Giovanna / Monna Vanna
- Paul Wegener as Guido Gursino
- Hans Sturm as Burgli
- Paul Graetz as Gennezzano
- Hans Trautner as Toni
- Emil Rameau as Frederigo Fondalo
- Max Pohl as Vater Coelestin
- Toni Zimmerer as Machiavelli
- Albert Steinrück as Andreas Buonacorsi
- Lyda Salmonova as Maddalena Pazzi
- Olaf Fjord as Pitellozo Vitelli
- Viktor Gehring as Paolo
- Fritz Kampers as Rinuzzio
- Oscar Marion

== Reception ==
A contemporary review praised Parry's performance: "[she] acts with intuitive charm, and moves regally through the vicissitudes of her fate . Her beauty is as a gleaming pearl that enhances the brilliance of the setting".

== See also ==
- Monna Vanna (1915)

== Bibliography ==
- Bock, Hans-Michael & Bergfelder, Tim. The Concise CineGraph. Encyclopedia of German Cinema. Berghahn Books, 2009.
