= The Romance of a Poor Sinner =

1922 film directed by Richard Eichberg

- Directed by: Richard Eichberg
- Written by: Leo Koffler; Helmuth Orthmann
- Produced by: Richard Eichberg
- Starring: Lee Parry; Aruth Wartan; Eduard Rothauser
- Cinematography: Paul Adler
- Production company: Richard Eichberg-Film
- Release date: 3 February 1922
- Country: Germany
- Languages: Silent; German intertitles

The Romance of a Poor Sinner (German: Der Roman einer armen Sünderin) is a 1922 German silent film directed by Richard Eichberg and starring Lee Parry, Aruth Wartan and Eduard Rothauser.

The film's sets were designed by the art director Jacek Rotmil.

== Cast ==
- Lee Parry
- Aruth Wartan
- Eduard Rothauser
- Max Wogritsch
- Walter Steinbeck
- Gerhard Ritterband
- Gustav Birkholz
- Syme Delmar
- Rudolf Klein-Rhoden
- Josef Commer
- Paul Ludwig

== Bibliography ==
- Bock, Hans-Michael & Bergfelder, Tim. The Concise CineGraph. Encyclopedia of German Cinema. Berghahn Books, 2009.
