= Gerhard Ritterband =

German actor

- Born: 8 May 1904; Berlin, German Empire
- Died: 29 September 1959 (aged 55); West Berlin, West Germany
- Occupation: Actor
- Years active: 1919–1933 (film )

Gerhard Ritterband (1904–1959) was a German film actor.

== Selected filmography ==
- The Doll (1919)
- The Princess of the Nile (1920)
- Va banque (1920)
- A Day on Mars (1921)
- Four Around a Woman (1921)
- The Dance of Love and Happiness (1921)
- Evelyn's Love Adventures (1921)
- The Moneylender's Daughter (1922)
- Girl of the Berlin Streets (1922)
- Your Valet (1922)
- The Romance of a Poor Sinner (1922)
- Maciste and the Silver King's Daughter (1922)
- Maciste and the Chinese Chest (1923)
- Niniche (1925)
- The Motorist Bride (1925)
- Old Mamsell's Secret (1925)
- The Dice Game of Life (1925)
- The Salesgirl from the Fashion Store (1925)
- Love's Finale (1925)
- The Captain from Koepenick (1926)
- The Circus of Life (1926)
- The Mill at Sanssouci (1926)
- The Bank Crash of Unter den Linden (1926)
- Annemarie and Her Cavalryman (1926)
- Darling, Count the Cash (1926)
- Bigamy (1927)
- Benno Stehkragen (1927)
- Paragraph 182 (1927)
- The Woman with the World Record (1927)
- The Lady from Argentina (1928)
- Ariadne in Hoppegarten (1928)
- The Market of Life (1928)
- Because I Love You (1928)
- Inherited Passions (1929)
- The Girl with the Whip (1929)
- The Ship of Lost Souls (1929)
- Column X (1929)
- Beware of Loose Women (1929)
- End of the Rainbow (1930)
- Cadets (1931)
- Under False Flag (1932)
- Wedding at Lake Wolfgang (1933)

== Bibliography ==
- Hardt, Ursula. From Caligari to California: Erich Pommer's life in the International Film Wars. Berghahn Books, 1996.
