= Robert Scholz (actor) =

German actor

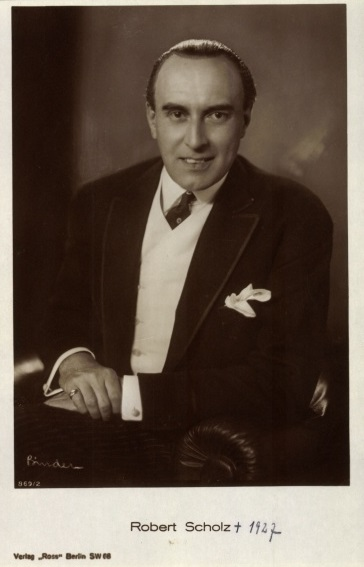
- Born: 23 April 1886; Germany
- Died: 10 October 1927 (aged 41); Berlin, Germany
- Occupation: Actor
- Years active: 1919–1928

Robert Scholz (23 April 1886 – 10 October 1927) was a German film actor of the silent era. He appeared in 76 films between 1919 and 1928. He was born in Germany and died in Berlin.

== Selected filmography ==
- A Drive into the Blue (1919)
- The White Roses of Ravensberg (1919)
- Die Fluch der Menschheit (1920)
- Der Tanz auf dem Vulkan (1920)
- The White Peacock (1920)
- Der Im Rausche der Milliarden (1920)
- About the Son (1921)
- Count Varenne's Lover (1921)
- Sons of the Night (1921)
- The Experiment of Professor Mithrany (1921)
- Danton (1921)
- The Buried Self (1921)
- Symphony of Death (1921)
- Lola Montez, the King's Dancer (1922)
- Bigamy (1922)
- Barmaid (1922)
- Only One Night (1922)
- Fratricide (1922)
- Yvette, the Fashion Princess (1922)
- Yellow Star (1922)
- Shame (1922)
- She and the Three (1922)
- Ihre Hoheit die Tänzerin (1922)
- The Ancient Law (1923)
- The Fifth Street (1923)
- Mister Radio (1924)
- The Girl from Capri (1924)
- To a Woman of Honour (1924)
- Darling of the King (1924)
- Fever for Heights (1924)
- Za La Mort (1924)
- The Little Duke (1924)
- The Blackguard (1925)
- Tragedy (1925)
- The Island of Dreams (1925)
- The Flight in the Night (1926)
- Roses from the South (1926)
- Lace (1926)
- The Prince and the Dancer (1926)
- Sword and Shield (1926)
- The Love of Jeanne Ney (1927)
- The Bordello in Rio (1927)
- Flirtation (1927)
- When the Young Wine Blossoms (1927)
- Heads Up, Charley (1927)
- The Queen of Spades (1927)
- Eva and the Grasshopper (1927)
- The False Prince (1927)
- Give Me Life (1928)
- The Market of Life (1928)
