= Chaste Susanne (1926 film) =

1926 film directed by Richard Eichberg

- Movie poster
- Directed by: Richard Eichberg
- Written by: Georg Okonkowski (libretto); Maurice Desvallières (play); Antony Mars (play); Hans Sturm
- Produced by: Richard Eichberg
- Starring: Lilian Harvey; Willy Fritsch; Ruth Weyher; Otto Wallburg
- Cinematography: Heinrich Gärtner
- Production company: Richard Eichberg-Film
- Distributed by: UFA
- Release date: 11 November 1926
- Country: Germany
- Languages: Silent; German intertitles

Chaste Susanne (German: Die keusche Susanne) is a 1926 German silent comedy film directed by Richard Eichberg and starring Lilian Harvey, Willy Fritsch and Ruth Weyher. It is based on the 1910 operetta Die keusche Susanne composed by Jean Gilbert with a libretto by Georg Okonkowski. In Britain it was released under the alternative title The Girl in the Taxi in reference to The Girl in the Taxi in the English version of the operetta. The film's art direction is by Jacek Rotmil. It was filmed at the Johannisthal Studios in Berlin.

It marked the first pairing of Harvey and Fritsch who went on to become the leading screen couple in Weimar and early Nazi cinema. The film premiered at the UFA-Palast am Zoo and was a smash hit on its release.

Full movie

== Cast ==
- Lilian Harvey as Jacqueline
- Willy Fritsch as René Boislurette
- Ruth Weyher as Susanne
- Otto Wallburg as Charency
- Hans Junkermann as Baron Aubrais
- Lydia Potechina as Baronin Aubrais
- Sascha Bragowa as Charencys Frau Rose
- Werner Fuetterer as Hubert
- Hans Wassmann as Dr. med. Pomarel
- Ernst Hofmann as Henry, Renés Freund
- Wilhelm Bendow
- Albert Paulig

== Bibliography ==
- Ascheid, Antje (2003). Hitler's Heroines: Stardom and Womanhood in Nazi Cinema. Philadelphia: Temple University Press. ISBN 978-1-56639-984-5.
- Kreimeier, Klaus (1999). The Ufa Story: A History of Germany's Greatest Film Company, 1918–1945. Berkeley: University of California Press. ISBN 978-0-520-22069-0.
