= The Circle of Death =

1922 film

- Directed by: William Karfiol
- Written by: Maxim Chrumow (novel); Ruth Goetz; William Karfiol
- Starring: Johannes Riemann; Olga Chekhova; Albert Steinrück
- Cinematography: Heinrich Gartner; Friedrich Weinmann
- Production company: Problem-Film
- Release date: 5 April 1922
- Country: Germany
- Languages: Silent; German intertitles

The Circle of Death (German: Der Todesreigen) is a 1922 German silent drama film directed by William Karfiol and starring Johannes Riemann, Olga Chekhova and Albert Steinrück.

The film's sets were designed by the art director Siegfried Wroblewsky.

== Cast ==
- Johannes Riemann as Leonid Lowitsch Rumin
- Olga Chekhova as Olga Petrowna
- Albert Steinrück as Lebedow, Reitknecht
- Hans Adalbert Schlettow as Konstantin Chrenow
- Fritz Kampers as Leo Maximow
- Rudolf Del Zopp
- Lilly Eisenlohr
- Olga Engl
- Ida Fane
- Maria Forescu
- Eduard Koffler
- Robert Leffler
- Clementine Plessner
- Paul Rehkopf
- Robert C. Rohde
- Hedwig Schröder
- Sylvia Torf

== Bibliography ==
- Grange, William. Cultural Chronicle of the Weimar Republic. Scarecrow Press, 2008.
