= Ernst Hofmann =

German actor (1880–1945)

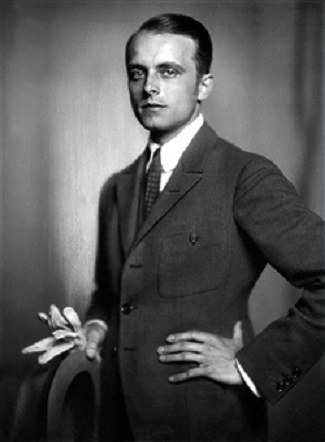
- Hofmann in 1927
- Born: 7 December 1880; Breslau, German Empire
- Died: 27 April 1945 (aged 64); Potsdam, Nazi Germany
- Occupation: Actor
- Years active: 1911–1928
- Spouse: Hedda Vernon (m. 1917; died 1925)

Ernst Karl Heinrich Hofmann (7 December 1880 – 27 April 1945) was a German stage and film actor.

== Selected filmography ==
- The White Roses (1916)
- Dr. Hart's Diary (1917)
- Countess Kitchenmaid (1918)
- Ikarus, the Flying Man (1918)
- The Mistress of the World (1919)
- The Boy in Blue (1919)
- The Spinning Ball (1919)
- Algol (1920)
- Intrigue (1920)
- Satan (1920)
- The Red Poster (1920)
- Fanny Elssler (1920)
- About the Son (1921)
- Trix, the Romance of a Millionairess (1921)
- Memoirs of a Film Actress (1921)
- Off the Rails (1921)
- Miss Beryll (1921)
- The Inheritance of Tordis (1921)
- Parisian Women (1921)
- Man Overboard (1921)
- Louise de Lavallière (1922)
- The Call of Destiny (1922)
- Circus People (1922)
- Shadows of the Past (1922)
- The Golden Net (1922)
- The Big Shot (1922)
- Marie Antoinette, the Love of a King (1922)
- Lyda Ssanin (1923)
- The Fifth Street (1923)
- Jimmy: The Tale of a Girl and Her Bear (1923)
- Die Fledermaus (1923)
- Gobseck (1924)
- Lord Reginald's Derby Ride (1924)
- The Four Marriages of Matthias Merenus (1924)
- Express Train of Love (1925)
- The Morals of the Alley (1925)
- The Motorist Bride (1925)
- In the Valleys of the Southern Rhine (1925)
- Chaste Susanne (1926)
- The Adventurers (1926)
- The Woman's Crusade (1926)
- Always Be True and Faithful (1927)
- U-9 Weddigen (1927)
- Adam and Eve (1928)
- The Last Performance of the Circus Wolfson (1928)
- A Woman Branded (1931)
- Playing with Fire (1934)

== Bibliography ==
- Jung, Uli; Schatzberg, Walter (1999). Beyond Caligari: The Films of Robert Wiene. New York: Berghahn Books. ISBN 978-1-57181-156-1.
