= Jettatore (1919 film) =

1919 film directed by Richard Eichberg

- Directed by: Richard Eichberg
- Written by: Leo Leipziger; Hans Rameau; Arthur Teuber
- Produced by: Richard Eichberg
- Starring: Aenderly Lebius; Lee Parry; Bruno Decarli
- Cinematography: Joe Rive
- Production company: Richard Eichberg-Film
- Distributed by: Central-Film-Vertriebs
- Release date: October 1919
- Country: Germany
- Languages: Silent; German intertitles

Jettatore is a 1919 German silent crime film directed by Richard Eichberg and starring Aenderly Lebius, Lee Parry and Bruno Decarli.

The film's sets were designed by the art director Willi Herrmann.

== Cast ==
- Aenderly Lebius as Sir Percy Haig
- Lee Parry
- Bruno Decarli as Baron Gaston de Saint Amant
- Violetta Napierska as Fedja - eine junge Zigeunerin
- Karl Halden as Graf Altavilla
- Emil Rameau as Fürst Jellinow
- Oscar Sabo as Prologue speaker

== Bibliography ==
- Alfred Krautz. International directory of cinematographers, set- and costume designers in film, Volume 4. Saur, 1984.
