= Youth (1922 film) =

1922 film

- Directed by: Fred Sauer
- Written by: Max Halbe (play); Fred Sauer
- Starring: Grete Reinwald; Fritz Schulz; Fritz Rasp
- Cinematography: Heinrich Gärtner
- Production company: Hermes-Film
- Release date: 6 October 1922
- Country: Germany
- Languages: Silent; German intertitles

Youth (German: Jugend) is a 1922 German silent film directed by Fred Sauer and starring Grete Reinwald, Fritz Schulz and Fritz Rasp.

== Cast ==
- Grete Reinwald as Anna
- Fritz Schulz as Hans Hartwig
- Heinz Salfner as Pastor Hoppe
- Theodor Loos as Kapellan Schigorski
- Ilka Grüning
- Fritz Rasp as Amandus
- Herbert Stock as Burgermeister Hartwig
- Ida Perry as Frau Burgermeister
- Alfred Schmasow
- Rolf Jäger
- Käthe Haack
- Jori Sarno
- Ernst Pröckl

== Bibliography ==
- Alfred Krautz. International directory of cinematographers, set- and costume designers in film, Volume 4. Saur, 1984.
- Goble, Alan. The Complete Index to Literary Sources in Film. Walter de Gruyter, 1999.
