= Gertrud de Lalsky =

German actress (1878–1958)

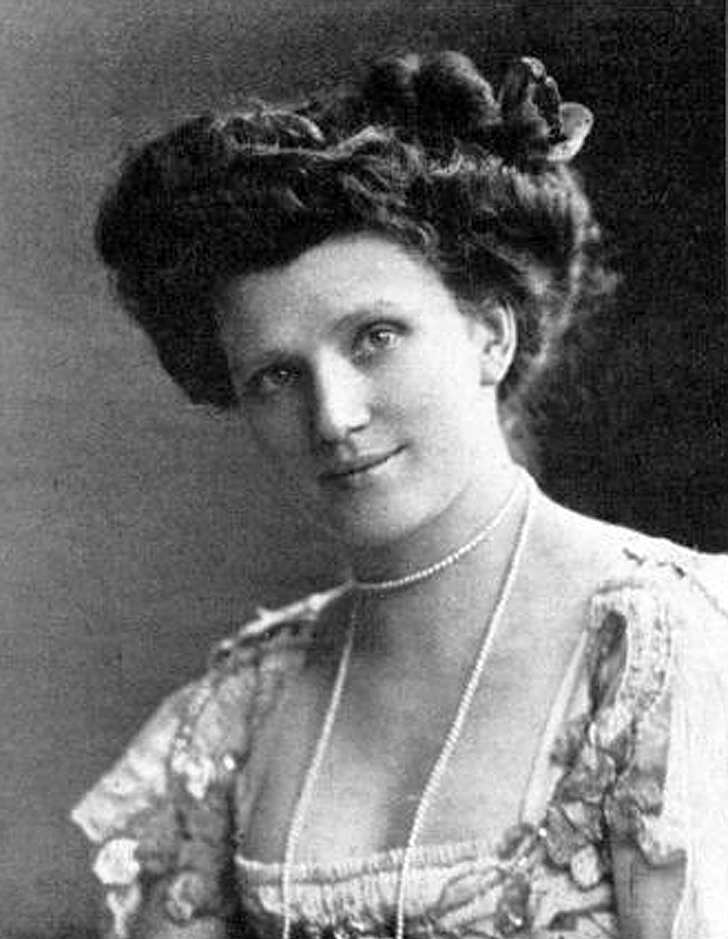
- Born: 27 January 1878; Danzig, Prussia, German Empire
- Died: 16 September 1958; Wilmersdorf, West Berlin, West Germany
- Occupation: Actress

Gertrud de Lalsky (27 January 1878 in Danzig – 16 September 1958 in West Berlin) was a German actress.

== Selected filmography ==
- Catherine the Great (1920)
- Hypnosis (1920)
- Fridericus Rex (1922)
- The Island of Tears (1923)
- Prater (1924)
- Gobseck (1924)
- Debit and Credit (1924)
- The Humble Man and the Chanteuse (1925)
- I Lost My Heart in Heidelberg (1926)
- Chance the Idol (1927)
- Out of the Mist (1927)
- Linden Lady on the Rhine (1927)
- My Heidelberg, I Can Not Forget You (1927)
- The Strange Night of Helga Wangen (1928)
- A Girl with Temperament (1928)
- Crucified Girl (1929)
- Painted Youth (1929)
- The Love Waltz (1930)
- The Emperor's Sweetheart (1931)
- Mädchen in Uniform (1931)
- Holzapfel Knows Everything (1932)
- The English Marriage (1934)
- The Higher Command (1935)
- Dinner Is Served (1936)
- The Great and the Little Love (1938)
- Heimat (1938)
- The Blue Fox (1938)
- Target in the Clouds (1939)
- Madame Butterfly (1939)
- Carl Peters (1941)
- Die beiden Schwestern (1943)
- Anna Alt (1945)
- The Noltenius Brothers (1945)
- The Court Concert (1948)
