= Aruth Wartan =

German actor

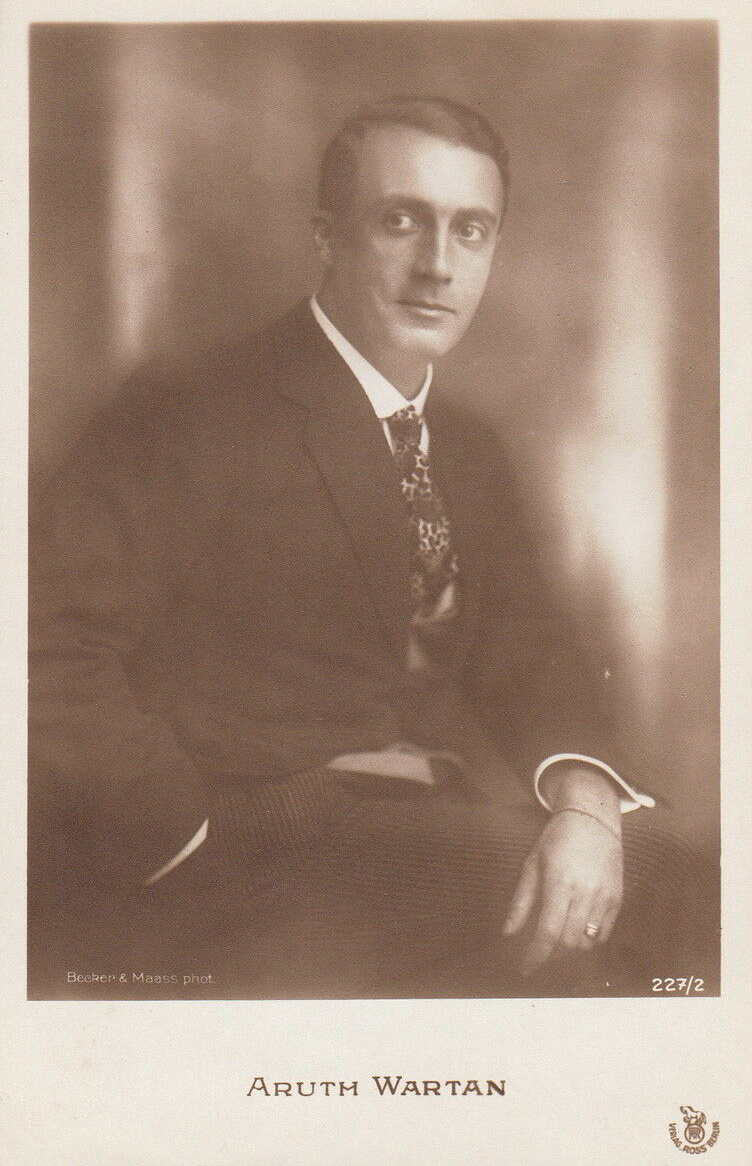
- Born: Arutjun Vartanian; 23 June 1880; Nakhichevan, Russian Empire
- Died: 14 April 1945 (aged 64); Berlin, Nazi Germany
- Occupation: Actor
- Years active: 1916–1945 (film)

Aruth Wartan (or Haruth Vartan, Armenian: Հարութ Վարդան; 23 June 1880 – 14 April 1945) was a German film actor of Armenian origin who appeared in around ninety films during his career, generally in supporting roles.

== Life and career ==
Born Arutjun Wartanian in Nakhichevan in the Russian Empire, he was of Armenian heritage. in the Russian Empire He graduated from high school in 1898 in Tbilisi, Georgia, and then briefly studied medicine in Kharkov (now in Ukraine). Around the turn of the century he briefly lived in Japan before relocating to St. Petersburg. During the Revolution of 1905 he moved to Saxony in Germany and studied at the Freiberg University of Mining and Technology. He also worked in Chile and Bolivia before returning to Germany and working as a mining engineer then moving into acting and performing on the stage and screen (since 1916).

During his early years he often appeared in leading roles, but as time passed he switched to character roles. In the Nazi era he played small roles, particularly Russians, in propaganda films such as Attack on Baku (1942). He died of stroke in the last weeks of the Second World War.

== Selected filmography ==
- The Ghost Hunt (1918)
- Margot de Plaisance (1919)
- Christian Wahnschaffe (1920)
- Evelyn's Love Adventures (1921)
- The Living Propeller (1921)
- Her Highness the Dancer (1922)
- Girl of the Berlin Streets (1922)
- The Moneylender's Daughter (1922)
- The Romance of a Poor Sinner (1922)
- The Shadow of the Mosque (1923)
- Father Voss (1925)
- The Man on the Comet (1925)
- People in Need (1925)
- The Eleven Schill Officers (1926)
- The Red Mouse (1926)
- The Villa in Tiergarten Park (1927)
- Escape from Hell (1928)
- Luther (1928)
- Eddy Polo in the Wasp's Nest (1928)
- Orient (1928)
- Volga Volga (1928)
- Taxi at Midnight (1929)
- Men Without Work (1929)
- His Best Friend (1929)
- The Ship of Lost Souls (1929)
- The Man in the Dark (1930)
- Busy Girls (1930)
- A Storm Over Zakopane (1931)
- Shadows of the Underworld (1931)
- Road to Rio (1931)
- The Adventurer of Tunis (1931)
- Tannenberg (1932)
- Death Over Shanghai (1932)
- Asew (1935)
- Across the Desert (1936)
- City of Anatol (1936)
- His Best Friend (1937)
- The Impossible Mister Pitt (1938)
- Men, Animals and Sensations (1938)
- The Desert Song (1939)
- The Fire Devil (1940)
- A Man Astray (1940)
- Carl Peters (1941)
- Secret File W.B.1 (1942)
- The Adventures of Baron Munchausen (1943)

== Bibliography ==
- Giesen, Rolf. Nazi Propaganda Films: A History and Filmography. McFarland & Company, 2003.
- Grange, William. Cultural Chronicle of the Weimar Republic. Scarecrow Press, 2008.
