= Holzapfel Knows Everything =

1932 film

- Directed by: Victor Janson
- Written by: Heinz Goldberg; Stephan Mihaly; Charlie Roellinghoff
- Starring: Felix Bressart; Iván Petrovich; Gretl Theimer
- Cinematography: Heinrich Gärtner
- Music by: Willy Rosen; Hans J. Salter
- Production company: Elite-Tonfilm-Produktion
- Distributed by: Siegel-Monopolfilm
- Release date: 5 February 1932
- Running time: 88 minutes
- Country: Germany
- Language: German

Holzapfel Knows Everything (German: Holzapfel weiß alles) is a 1932 German comedy film directed by Victor Janson and starring Felix Bressart, Iván Petrovich and Gretl Theimer. It was shot at the Grunewald Studios in Berlin. The film's sets were designed by the art director Jacek Rotmil.

== Main cast ==
- Felix Bressart as Johannes Georg Holzapfel
- Iván Petrovich as Stephan Berregi
- Gretl Theimer as Eva Stein
- Theodor Loos as Konsul van Doeren
- Dieterle Henkels as Teddy Stein, ein Junge
- Anton Pointner as Oskar
- Julius Falkenstein as Jule
- John Mylong as Fritz
- Paul Morgan as Emil
- Robert Näestelberger as Jakob
- Josef Bunzl as Heinrich
- Nico Turoff as Hans
- Henry Bender as Otto, Kneipenwirt
- Gertrud de Lalsky as Frau von Bloemen
- Eugen Burg as Polizeikommissar

== Bibliography ==
- Bock, Hans-Michael & Bergfelder, Tim. The Concise Cinegraph: Encyclopaedia of German Cinema. Berghahn Books, 2009.
