= Heinrich Gärtner (cinematographer) =

Austrian cinematographer (1895–1962)

- Born: 16 March 1895; Radautz, Bukovina; Austro-Hungarian Empire
- Died: 12 December 1962 (aged 67); Madrid, Spain
- Other name: Enrique Guerner
- Occupation: Cinematographer
- Years active: 1915 - 1962

Heinrich Gärtner (1895–1962) was an Austrian cinematographer who worked on over 180 films during his career. He is often credited as Enrique Guerner in his later films. Gärtner was born in Radautz which was then part of the Austro-Hungarian Empire, but later became Rădăuți in Romania. He entered the German film industry in 1915, and worked prolifically during the silent era.

As Gärtner was of Jewish descent, he was forced to flee Germany once the Nazis gained power in 1933. He settled in Spain, where he continued to work following Franco's victory in the Spanish Civil War. Gärtner was an influential figure in Spanish cinema, introducing elements of expressionism and training rising filmmakers such as Alfredo Fraile, José F. Aguayo and Cecilio Paniagua.

== Selected filmography ==
- Dancer of Death (1920)
- Demon Blood (1920)
- Off the Rails (1921)
- The Black Spider (1921)
- Sunken Worlds (1922)
- The Circle of Death (1922)
- Youth (1922)
- Fräulein Raffke (1923)
- The Comedian's Child (1923)
- Time Is Money (1923)
- Heart of Stone (1924)
- The Enchantress (1924)
- The Most Beautiful Woman in the World (1924)
- Lord Reginald's Derby Ride (1924)
- The Motorist Bride (1925)
- The Woman with That Certain Something (1925)
- Women of Luxury (1925)
- The Prince and the Dancer (1926)
- Chaste Susanne (1926)
- The Prince of Pappenheim (1927)
- Fabulous Lola (1927)
- Song (1928)
- Hai-Tang (1930)
- The Copper (1930)
- Night Birds (1930)
- The Flame of Love (1930)
- The Road to Dishonour (1930)
- The Daredevil (1931)
- Let's Love and Laugh (1931)
- The Woman Between (1931)
- Once There Was a Waltz (1932)
- Theodor Körner (1932)
- The Blue of Heaven (1932)
- Overnight Sensation (1932)
- Holzapfel Knows Everything (1932)
- Adventures in the Engadin (1932)
- Countess Mariza (1932)
- Typhoon (1933)
- Sister San Sulpicio (1934)
- Wild Cattle (1934)
- Doña Francisquita (1934)
- Nobleza baturra (1935)
- Currito of the Cross (1936)
- Morena Clara (1936)
- La Dolores (1939)
- Raza (1942)
- El frente de los suspiros (1942)
- The Cursed Village (1942)
- The House of Rain (1943)
- Orosia (1944)
- Last Stand in the Philippines (1945)
- Three Mirrors (1947)
- Doña María the Brave (1948)
- A Toast for Manolete (1948)
- Tales of the Alhambra (1950)
- The Great Galeoto (1951)
- Devil's Roundup (1952)
- Amaya (1952)
- Such is Madrid (1953)
- High Fashion (1954)
- He Died Fifteen Years Ago (1954)
- Miracle of Marcelino (1955)
- Three are Three (1955)
- It Happened in Broad Daylight (1958)
- Back to the Door (1959)
- Green Harvest (1961)
- You and Me Are Three (1962)

== Bibliography ==
- Bock, Hans-Michael & Bergfelder, Tim. The Concise CineGraph. Encyclopedia of German Cinema. Berghahn Books, 2009.
- Kinder, Marsha. Blood Cinema: The Reconstruction of National Identity in Spain. University of California Press, 1 Jan 1993.
