= Hans Sturm (actor) =

German actor and screenwriter (1874–1933)

- Born: 21 January 1874; Dresden, German Empire
- Died: 17 January 1933 (aged 58); Berlin, Germany
- Occupations: Actor, writer
- Years active: 1918–1931 (film)

Hans Sturm (1874 – 1933) was a German actor, screenwriter and playwright. He worked with the director Richard Eichberg on a number of films either in acting of scripting roles. His stage play The Unfaithful Eckehart was turned into films in 1931 and 1940.

== Selected filmography ==
- The Pied Piper of Hamelin (1918)
- The Foreign Prince (1918)
- The Golem: How He Came into the World (1920)
- Lady Hamilton (1921)
- Monna Vanna (1922)
- The Game with Women (1922)
- The Treasure of Gesine Jacobsen (1923)
- Living Buddhas (1925)
- Love and Trumpets (1925)
- The Woman with That Certain Something (1925)
- The Girl on the Road (1925)
- Passion (1925)
- The Motorist Bride (1925)
- Chaste Susanne (1926)
- The Girl on a Swing (1926)
- Princess Trulala (1926)
- The Serfs (1928)

== Bibliography ==
- Ann C. Paietta. Saints, Clergy and Other Religious Figures on Film and television, 1895–2003. McFarland, 2005.
