= Richard Eichberg =

German film director (1888–1953)

- Born: 27 October 1888; Berlin, German Empire
- Died: 8 May 1952 (aged 63); Munich, West Germany
- Occupations: Film director, film producer
- Years active: 1915–1950

Richard Eichberg (27 October 1888 – 8 May 1952) was a German film director and producer. He directed 87 films between 1915 and 1949. He also produced 77 films between 1915 and 1950. He was born in Berlin, Germany, and died in Munich, West Germany.

== Selected filmography ==
- The Sign of Guilt (1918)
- Jettatore (1919)
- Sins of the Parents (1919)
- Child on the Open Road (1919)
- Der Fluch der Menschheit (1920)
- Hypnose (1920)
- Der Tanz auf dem Vulkan (1920)
- Im Rausche der Milliarden (1920)
- Evelyn's Love Adventures (1921)
- The Living Propeller (1921)
- Ihre Hoheit die Tänzerin (1922)
- Monna Vanna (1922)
- The Moneylender's Daughter (1922)
- The Romance of a Poor Sinner (1922)
- Girl of the Berlin Streets (1922)
- Fräulein Raffke (1923)
- The Most Beautiful Woman in the World (1924)
- The Motorist Bride (1925)
- Women of Luxury (1925)
- The Girl on the Road (1925)
- Love and Trumpets (1925)
- The Woman with That Certain Something (1925)
- Passion (1925)
- Princess Trulala (1926)
- The Prince and the Dancer (1926)
- Chaste Susanne (1926)
- Marie's Soldier (1927)
- The Prince of Pappenheim (1927)
- Fabulous Lola (1927)
- The Serfs (1928)
- Song (1928)
- The Woman from Till 12 (1928)
- Pavement Butterfly (1929)
- Why Cry at Parting? (1929)
- The Flame of Love (English-language film, 1930)
  - The Road to Dishonour (German-language film, 1930)
  - Hai-Tang (French-language film, 1930)
- The Copper (German-language film, 1930)
- Night Birds (English-language film, 1930)
- Die Bräutigamswitwe (German-language film, 1931)
  - Let's Love and Laugh (English-language film, 1931)
- Trara um Liebe (1931)
- The Daredevil (1931)
- The Invisible Front (1932)
- A Precocious Girl (co-director: Max Neufeld, 1934)
- Quadrille d'amour (French-language film, 1935)
- The Cat in the Bag (German-language film, 1935)
- Le Contrôleur des wagons-lits (French-language film, 1935)
  - Der Schlafwagenkontrolleur (German-language film, 1935)
- The Czar's Courier (German-language film, 1936)
  - Michel Strogoff (French-language film, 1936)
- Es geht um mein Leben (1936)
- The Tiger of Eschnapur (German-language film, 1938)
  - Le Tigre du Bengale (French-language film, 1938)
- The Indian Tomb (German-language film, 1938)
  - Le Tombeau hindou (French-language film, 1938)
- The Trip to Marrakesh (1949)
- Scandal at the Embassy (dir. Erik Ode, 1950)
