= Fight of the Tertia =

Fight of the Tertia (German: Der Kampf der Tertia) may refer to:

- Fight of the Tertia (novel), a 1928 work by the German writer Wilhelm Speyer
- Fight of the Tertia (1929 film), a German film directed by Max Mack
- Fight of the Tertia (1952 film), a West German film directed by Erik Ode
