= Manolescu =

Manolescu is a Romanian surname that may refer to:

- Ciprian Manolescu (1978–), mathematician
- Nicolae Manolescu (1939–2024), literary critic
- Ion Manolescu-Strunga (1889–1951), liberal politician
- Mihail Manoilescu (1891–1950), fascist politician

== See also ==
- Manole (name)
- Manolescu (film)
- Manolescu's Memoirs
