= The Song of Life (1926 film) =

1926 film

- Directed by: Arthur Bergen
- Written by: Arthur Bergen; Rudolf Herzog (novel); Ernst Iros
- Starring: Carl de Vogt; Erna Moreno; Angelo Ferrari
- Cinematography: Karl Attenberger
- Production company: Münchner Lichtspielkunst
- Distributed by: Bavaria Film
- Release date: December 1926 (Berlin)
- Country: Germany
- Languages: Silent; German intertitles

The Song of Life (German: Das Lebenslied) is a 1926 German silent film directed by Arthur Bergen and starring Carl de Vogt, Erna Moreno and Angelo Ferrari.

The art direction was by Ludwig Reiber. It was made at the Emelka Studios in Munich.

== Cast ==
In alphabetical order

- Carl de Vogt
- Wilhelm Diegelmann
- Angelo Ferrari
- Adolf Klein
- Theodor Loos
- Erna Morena
- Sophie Pagay
- Karl Victor Plagge
- Helga Thomas

== Bibliography ==
- Kasten, Jürgen; Bruns, Brigitte (2005). Erna Morena. Munich: Belleville. ISBN 978-3-936298-52-9.
