= Froboess =

Froboess is a German family name.

People:

- Cornelia Froboess (born 1943), German singler and actress
- Gerhard Froboess (1906–1976), German composer, sound engineer and music publisher
- Harry Froboess (1899–1985), German stuntman, high-diving champion
