= Between Day and Dream =

1922 film

- Directed by: Bruno Ziener
- Written by: Hans Hyan
- Cinematography: Gustave Preiss
- Production company: Wima-Film
- Release date: 1922
- Country: Germany
- Languages: Silent; German intertitles

Between Day and Dream (German: Zwischen Tag und Traum) is a 1922 German silent film directed by Bruno Ziener.

The film's art direction was by Fritz Kraenke.

== Cast ==
In alphabetical order
- Alfred Abel as Savioli
- Hans Felix as Gärtnereibesitzer Rasmussen
- Rudolf Forster as Graf Cederström
- Marianne Gonia as Rote Therese
- Kurt Katch as Mac Duffre
- Maud Marion as Schauspielerin Ilona
- Edwin Stempel as Komiker Lind
- Hermine Straßmann-Witt as Rentiere Holmsen
- Josa Treptow as Ilonas Mutter
- Hermann Vallentin as Kriminalkommissar Dr. Nissen

== Bibliography ==
- Bock, Hans-Michael; Bergfelder, Tim, eds. (2009). The Concise Cinegraph: Encyclopaedia of German Cinema. New York: Berghahn Books. ISBN 978-1-57181-655-9.
