= Peter the Pirate =

1925 film directed by Arthur Robison

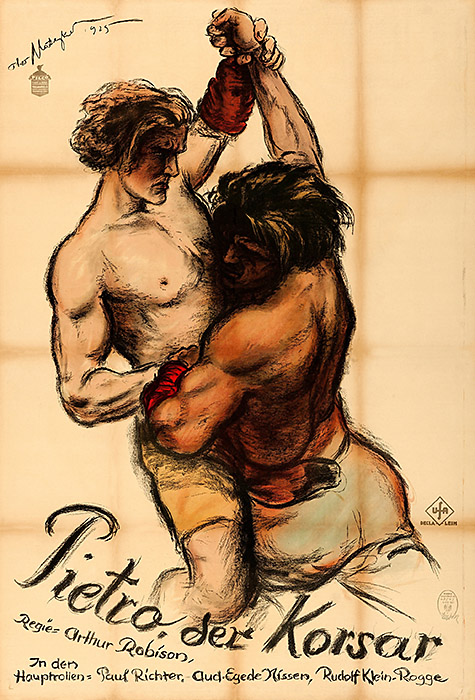
- Directed by: Arthur Robison
- Written by: Arthur Robison
- Based on: Pietro der Korsar und die Jüdin Cheirinca; 1925 novel by Wilhelm Hegeler
- Produced by: Erich Pommer
- Starring: Paul Richter; Aud Egede-Nissen; Rudolf Klein-Rogge; Fritz Richard
- Cinematography: Rudolph Maté; George Schnéevoigt; Fritz Arno Wagner
- Music by: Giuseppe Becce
- Production company: UFA
- Distributed by: UFA
- Release date: 19 February 1925
- Running time: 60 minutes
- Country: Germany
- Languages: Silent; German intertitles

Peter the Pirate (German: Pietro, der Korsar), also known in English as The Sea Wolves, is a 1925 German silent historical adventure film directed by Arthur Robison and starring Paul Richter, Aud Egede-Nissen, and Rudolf Klein-Rogge. It was based on the 1925 novel by Wilhelm Hegeler. Leni Riefenstahl was offered the role of female lead by producer Erich Pommer, but after doing a screen test she turned it down.

It was shot at the Babelsberg Studios in Berlin. The film's sets were designed by art director Albin Grau. The film premiered at the Union-Theater.

== Cast ==
- Paul Richter as Pietro
- Aud Egede-Nissen as Juana
- Rudolf Klein-Rogge as Salvatore, ein Korsarhauptmann
- Fritz Richard as Paulo, Pietros Vater
- Frida Richard as Guilia, Paulos Frau
- Walter von Allwoerden as Tomaso, Pietros Bruder
- Lilian Stevens as Nina
- Robert Garrison as Ruffio
- Jakob Tiedtke as Piombolo
- Georg John as Beppo
- Lydia Potechina as Marcella
- Edith Edwards

== Bibliography ==
- Bock, Hans-Michael; Bergfelder, Tim, eds. (2009). The Concise Cinegraph: Encyclopaedia of German Cinema. New York: Berghahn Books. ISBN 978-1-57181-655-9.
- Kreimeier, Klaus (1999). The Ufa Story: A History of Germany's Greatest Film Company, 1918–1945. Berkeley: University of California Press. ISBN 978-0-520-22069-0.
- Rother, Rainer (2003). Leni Riefenstahl: The Seduction of Genius. Translated by Bott, Martin H. London: Continuum International Publishing. ISBN 978-0-8264-7023-2.
