= The Wiskottens =

1926 film

- Directed by: Arthur Bergen
- Written by: Rudolf Herzog (novel); Marie Luise Droop
- Starring: Karl Platen; Gertrud Arnold; Harry Liedtke
- Cinematography: Leopold Kutzleb
- Production company: Eiko Film
- Distributed by: National Film
- Release date: 9 April 1926
- Country: Germany
- Languages: Silent; German intertitles

The Wiskottens (German: Die Wiskottens) is a 1926 German silent film directed by Arthur Bergen and starring Karl Platen, Gertrud Arnold and Harry Liedtke.

It was based on the 1903 novel of the same title. The film's sets were designed by the art director Max Knaake.

== Cast ==
- Karl Platen as Vater Wiskotten
- Gertrud Arnold as Mutter Wiskotten
- Harry Liedtke as Gustav - der 'Chef'
- Johannes Riemann as Wilhelm - der 'Englishman'
- Gottfried Hagedorn as August - der 'Fromme'
- Gustav Adolf Semler as Fritz - der 'Offizier', Sohn
- Werner Pittschau as Paul - der 'Poet', Sohn
- Werner Fuetterer as Ewald - der 'Maler', Sohn
- Maly Delschaft as Emilie - Gustavs Frau
- Hermann Picha as Jeremias Scharwächter - ihr Vater
- Frida Richard as Tante Josefine - seine Schwester
- Camilla von Hollay as Miß Mabel White
- Adolphe Engers as Gastwirt Zinters
- Erika Glässner as Gretchen - seine Tochter
- Robert Leffler as Werkmeister Kölsch
- Hélène Hallier as Anna
- Hans Brausewetter as Ernst
- Gustav Rickelt as Gastwirt 'Oweram'
- Ernst Behmer as Der Musterzeichner
- Hermann Vallentin as Der Arbeiter Wisczkowski
- Emil Rameau as Der Färber Barthelmes
- Karl Thiemann as Der Heizer Christian
- Maria Forescu as Zimmerwirtin
- Anna Müller-Lincke as Dienstmädchen Minna
- Max Wilmsen as Der Polizist
- Illo Gutschwager as Lehrling bei Scharwächter
- Frau Weber as Arbeiterin Mathilde
- Alphons Schünemann as Der kleine Gustav
- Inge Falken as Die kleine Emilie
