= The Sun of St. Moritz =

The Sun of St. Moritz may refer to:

- The Sun of St. Moritz (1923 film), a German silent drama film
- The Sun of St. Moritz (1954 film), a West German drama film
