= Harry Froboess =

German stunt diver and high diver

- Born: Harry Arias Froboess; 23 November 1899; Dresden, Imperial Germany
- Died: 12 January 1985 (aged 85); Baar Switzerland
- Occupations: Diver, stuntman, Bademeister der Herzen
- Spouse: Hertha Froboess

Friedrich Harald August Froboess (23 October 1899 – 12 January 1985) was a German stunt diver, and high diver.

== Biography ==
Diving from an early age, his mother taught him to be a "jumping fish" and his father taught him gymnastics. Froboess won many championships. He did stunt doubling for many stars in silent film. In the end he could only compete with himself jumping from higher and higher bridges and towers into water, finally culminating in a jumped 361 feet (110 m) into Lake Constance from the airship Graf Zeppelin on June 22, 1936. This record still stands in Guinness World Records. Froboess is rumored to have taken part in over 400 movies, though most of his prominent credits were in Hollywood films.

He wrote a book about waterdiving and painted pictures, one displayed at The Gallery of Modern Art in New York. His wife Hertha Froboess was also a high diver.

== Stunt filmography ==
- Das Cabinet des Dr. Caligari (1920)
- Christoph Columbus (1923)
- Harry Hill, der Herr der Welt (1923)
- Harry Hills Jagd auf den Tod. 1. Teil (1925)
- Am Rande der Welt (English: At the Edge of the World) (1927)
- Skirt Shy (1929)
- The Blue Angel (1930)
- The Smiling Lieutenant (1931)
- Queen Christina (1933)
- The Sea Hawk (1940)
- The Bride Came C.O.D. (1941)
- Against All Flags (1952)
- The Master of Ballantrae (1953)
- River of No Return (1954)
- The Man from Laramie (1955)
- The Alamo (1960)
- The Hallelujah Trail (1965)
