= Grete Diercks =

German actress

Margarete "Grete" Diercks (September 1, 1890, in Hamburg – July 15, 1978, in Lauingen) was a German actress.

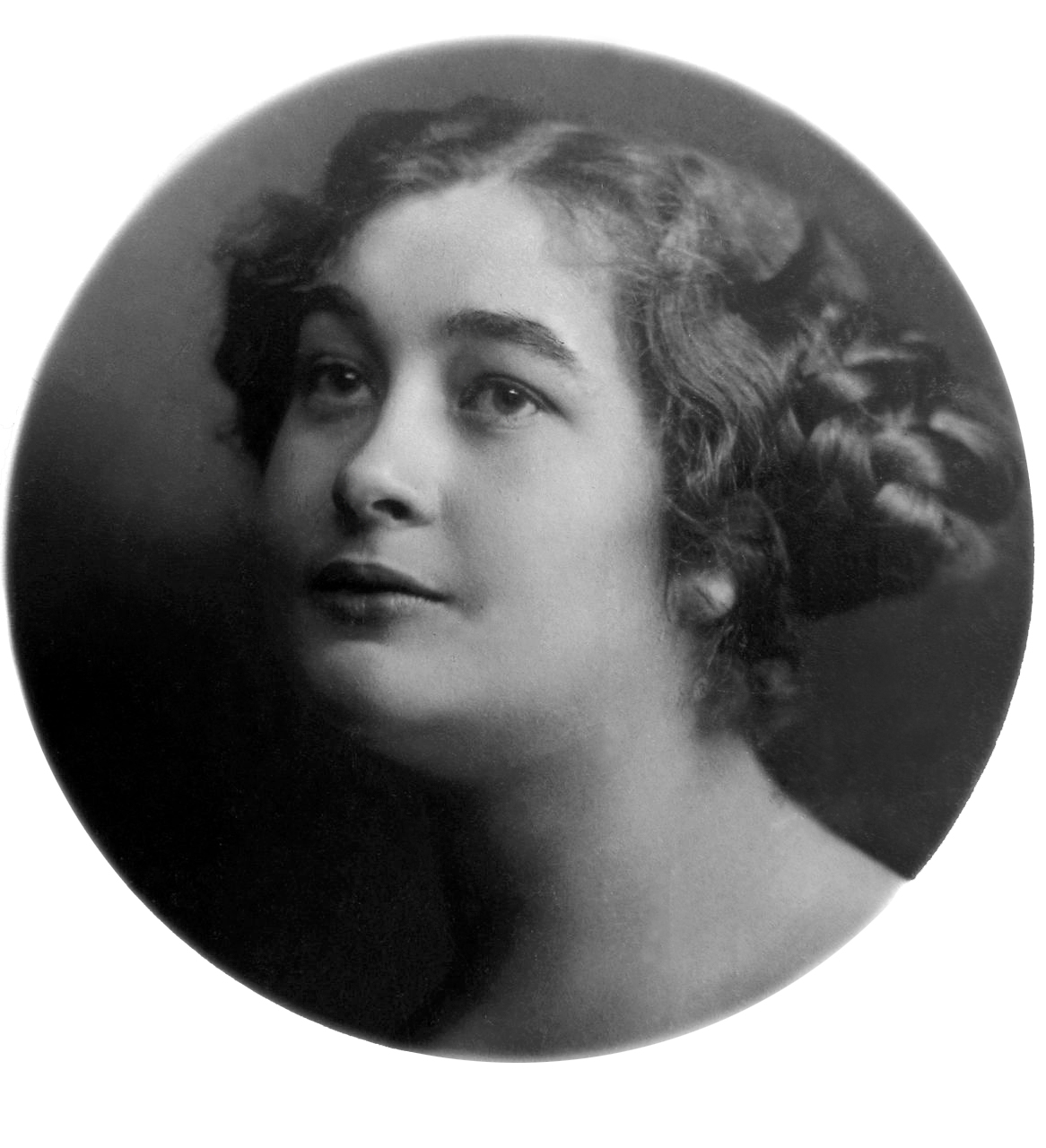
Grete Diercks Berlin 1912 – Restored

== Biography ==
Diercks had been active since childhood as an actress at the 1900 Deutsches Schauspielhaus in Hamburg. On her 11th birthday, she became a member of the ensemble there and regularly appeared on stage between the seasons of 1902–1903 to 1908–1909. Although she had never attended a formal acting school, she remained dedicated to the theater as a young woman. Through her work in 1912 at the theater in Riga, she gathered further acting experience. In Riga, she also met her future husband, an Engineer. Then, she went to Berlin where she took on various theater engagements, including roles in the theater in the Königgrätzer street in 1917. Diercks was not only active as a theater actress, but occasionally appeared as a singer, appearing c. 1914 in the title role in the operetta Prinzessin Herzlieb by Eduard Mörike.

The cinema gained importance in Diercks' artistic career only towards the end of World War I, and she was cast in a series of minor, supporting, and leading roles in a number of German productions, including Ernst Lubitsch's Carmen and Rausch and F. W. Murnau's Der brennende Acker and E. A. Dupont's first adaptation of the popular high-alpine drama Die Geierwally. She meanwhile continued to act in live theater performances, appearing in 1918 at the comedy house in Melchior Lengyel and Lajos Bíró's play Die Zarin and 1921 at the Berlin Lustspielhaus in Angelo Cana's Der Werwolf. Her last film was Die Sonne von St. Moritz from 1923. In the same year, she married, and she ended her acting career.

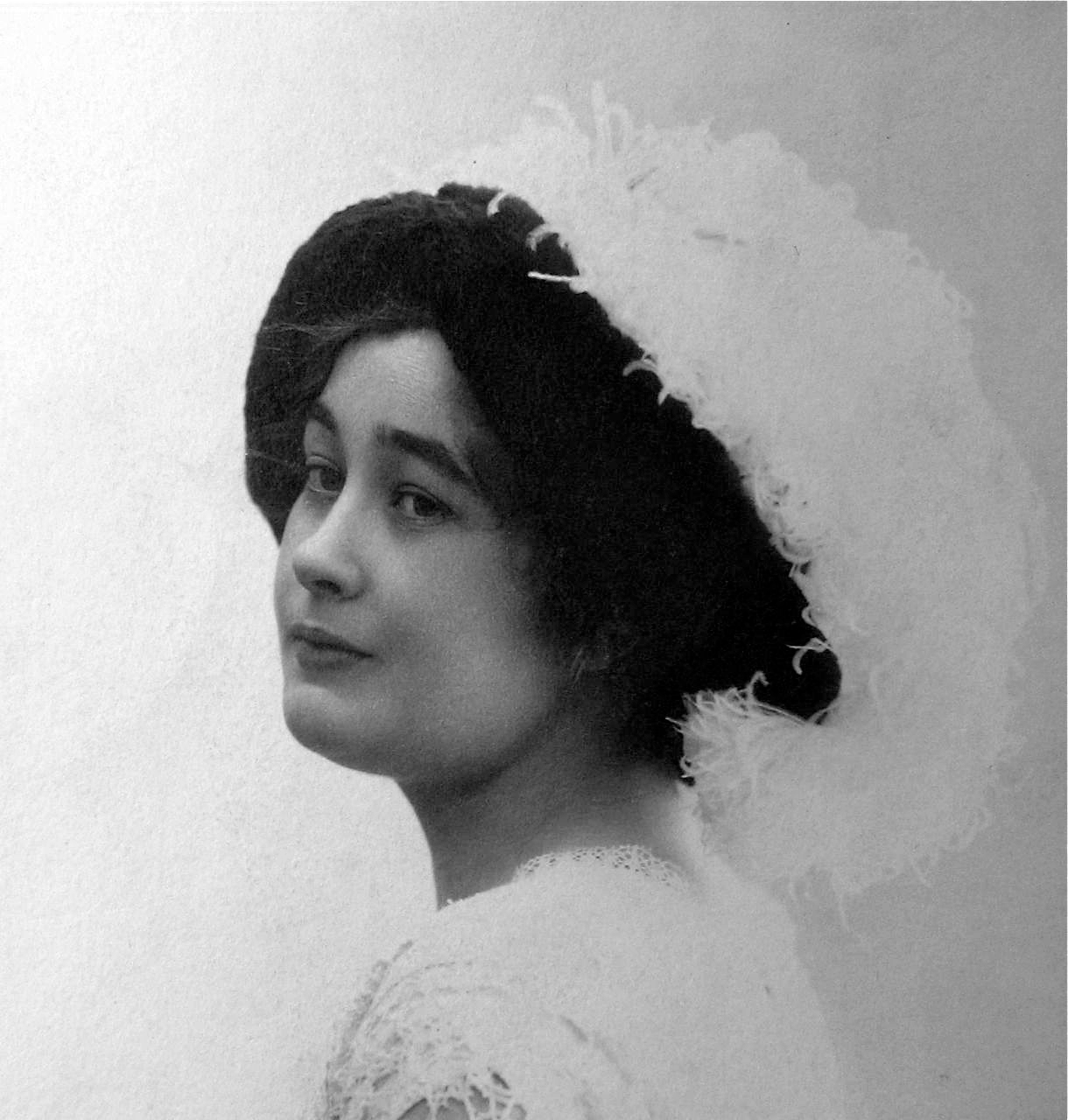
Grete Diercks Riga 1912 - Restored

== Filmography ==
Diercks was cast in several silent films:

- 1916: Die Fiebersonate (The Fever Sonata)
- Unusable (1917)
- 1918: Carmen (Released with subtitles in the United States in 1918 as Gypsy Blood)
- 1918: Fünf Minuten zu spät (Five Minutes Too Late)
- The Seeds of Life (1918)
- His Majesty the Hypochondriac (1918)
- 1919: Rausch (Intoxication)
- 1919: Todesurteil (Death Sentence)
- 1919: Zwangsliebe im Freistaat (Forced Love in the Free State)
- 1921: The Women of Gnadenstein
- 1921: Die Geierwally (The Vulture Wally)
- 1922: Der brennende Acker (The Burning Soil)
- At the Edge of the Great City (1922)
- The Fire Ship (1922)
- 1922: Der Kampf ums Ich (The Fight for the Self)
- 1922: Der Liebe Pilgerfahrt (The Pilgrimage of Love)
- 1923: And Yet Luck Came (Und dennoch kam das Glück')
- The Chain Clinks (1923)
- 1923: Die Sonne von St. Moritz (The Sun of St. Moritz)
