= Manolescu, Prince of Thieves =

1933 film

- Directed by: Georg C. Klaren; Willi Wolff
- Written by: Georg C. Klaren; Hans Rameau
- Produced by: Ellen Richter
- Starring: Iván Petrovich; Alfred Abel; Ellen Richter; Mady Christians
- Cinematography: Emil Schünemann
- Edited by: Roger von Norman
- Music by: Willy Rosen
- Production company: Hisa-Film
- Distributed by: Europa Film
- Release date: 17 March 1933
- Running time: 82 minutes
- Country: Germany
- Language: German

Manolescu, Prince of Thieves (German: Manolescu, der Fürst der Diebe) is a 1933 German comedy crime film directed by Georg C. Klaren and Willi Wolff and starring Iván Petrovich, Alfred Abel, Ellen Richter and Mady Christians. It was shot at the Johannisthal Studios in Berlin and on location in St. Moritz. The film's sets were designed by the art director Hans Jacoby. It was produced and released just as the Weimar Republic was giving way to Nazi Germany.

== Synopsis ==
An elegant man-about-town leads a secret life as a jewel thief. An insurance company hires a female investigator to try and track down the man behind the robberies that have led to large payouts, but in Paris he quickly sees through her scheme. Eventually he is caught and sentenced to prison in Germany, but manages to escape.

== Cast ==
- Iván Petrovich as George Manolescu
- Alfred Abel as Jan Hendriks, Generaldirektor Introp Versicherung
- Ellen Richter as Olivia, seine Frau
- Mady Christians as Comtesse Maria Freyenberg
- Hilde Hildebrand as Marion Lamond
- Fritz Kampers Max Krause, ehemaliger Rennfahrer
- Hubert von Meyerinck as Der Kellner im Hotel Ritz
- Olly Gebauer as Die Dame im Wartesaal
- Kurt Lilien as Der Nachtportier

== See also ==
- Manolescu's Memoirs (1920)
- Manolescu (1929)

== Bibliography ==
- Giesen, Rolf. The Nosferatu Story: The Seminal Horror Film, Its Predecessors and Its Enduring Legacy. McFarland, 2019.
- Klaus, Ulrich J. Deutsche Tonfilme: Jahrgang 1933. Klaus-Archiv, 1988.
