= The Mirror of the World =

1918 German silent film by Lupu Pick

- Directed by: Lupu Pick
- Written by: Felix Josky; Gerhard Lamprecht; Lupu Pick
- Produced by: Lupu Pick
- Starring: Adolf Klein; Fritz Richard; Gertrude Welcker; Bertold Reissig
- Cinematography: Ivar Petersen
- Production company: Rex-Film
- Release date: 1918
- Country: Germany
- Languages: Silent; German intertitles

The Mirror of the World (German: Der Weltspiegel) is a 1918 German silent film directed by Lupu Pick and starring Adolf Klein, Fritz Richard and Gertrude Welcker. It was the directoral debut of Pick who had been a prominent actor of the 1910s but had set up his own production company Rex-Film to take advantage of the booming German film industry. It was shot in Berlin. The film's art direction was by Hans Neirath.

== Cast ==
- Adolf Klein
- Fritz Richard
- Gertrude Welcker
- Bernd Aldor
- Bertold Reissig

== Bibliography ==
- Kreimeier, Klaus. The Ufa Story: A History of Germany's Greatest Film Company, 1918-1945. University of California Press, 1999.
