= Lisa Weise =

German actress and singer (1880–1951)

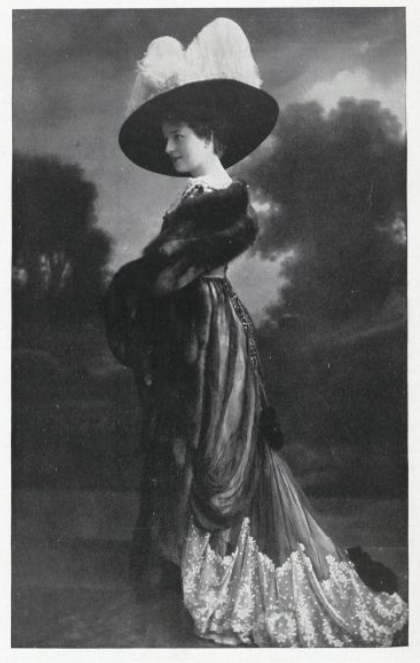
Weise in 1910

Lisa Weise (16 December 1880 as Louise Ottilie Georgine Anna Weise – 6 December 1951) was a German actress and singer.

== Life and career ==
Born in Weimar the daughter of the oboist and Grand Ducal chamber virtuoso Ernst Weise and his wife Ottilie, née Zimmermann, she began her stage career in 1903 in Metz and then played at various Berlin theatres between 1904 and 1910. In 1910 she moved to the Johann Strauss Theater in Vienna for one season before returning to Berlin, where she worked at the Neues Operettentheater am Schiffbauerdamm until 1917.

Parallel to her stage work, Weise regularly appeared in front of the camera as a leading actress from 1915 onwards, having already made an appearance in the sound picture The Count of Luxembourg in 1910. She usually acted alongside Karl Beckersachs under the direction of Friedrich Zelnik.

Weise was married from 1907 to 1919 to factory owner Felix Stern, who was the screenwriter responsible for Carl Wilhelm's 1915 feature film Carl and Carla.

Weise died in Weimar at the age of 70.

== Filmography ==
- 1910: Der Graf von Luxemburg
- 1915: Carl und Carla
- 1916: Fräulein Wildfang
- 1917: Klein Doortje
- 1917: Edelweiß
- 1917: Ein Zirkusmädel
- 1917: His Majesty the Hypochondriac
- 1917: Das große Los
- 1917: Gänseliesel
- 1918: Der Liftjunge
- 1918: Amalie – 45 Mark

== Radio plays ==
- 1926: Kurt Kraatz, Georg Okonkowski: Polish Economy. Posse with song in 3 acts. Directed by Alfred Braun (Sendespiel (radio play adaptation) – Funk-Stunde Berlin, Sendespielbühne – Abteilung: Schauspiel)
