= The Burning Soil =

1922 film by F. W. Murnau

- Poster
- Directed by: F. W. Murnau
- Written by: Willy Haas; Thea von Harbou; Arthur Rosen
- Produced by: Sascha Goron; Erich Pommer
- Starring: Eugen Klöpfer; Vladimir Gajdarov; Werner Krauss; Eduard von Winterstein; Georg John
- Cinematography: Fritz Arno Wagner; Karl Freund
- Production company: Deulig Film
- Distributed by: Deulig-Verleih
- Release date: 3 March 1922
- Running time: 110 min. restored version
- Country: Germany
- Languages: Silent film German intertitles

The Burning Soil (German: Der brennende Acker) is a 1922 German silent film directed by F.W. Murnau. It was made the same year as Murnau's Nosferatu and released in Germany around the same time. The film follows the struggle over a plot of petroleum-rich land.

It was shot at the Babelsberg Studio in Berlin. The film's sets were designed by the art director Rochus Gliese.

The film was considered lost until 1978, when it was discovered to have been owned by an Italian priest who organized screenings in mental hospitals. A restoration of the film was made with the assistance of French director Eric Rohmer.

== Plot ==
“Devil's Field” is a cursed place, that scares the entire population of a small village of Silesia, because an ancestor of the family Rudenburg perished there victim of a mysterious explosion while digging a well in search of a buried treasure. Count von Rudenburg, current title holder, is also searching for the treasure, without result. He lives in his castle with his second wife, Helga, and a daughter from a first marriage, capricious Gerda.

Screenshot

In the nearby village, an old peasant, Rog, dies leaving two sons, Peter, very attached to the family land, and ambitious Johannes who thinks he is too good to live a peasant's life. He becomes secretary to Count von Rudenburg and starts courting his daughter. One day, he overhears that the Count has found an oilfield under Devil's Field. Shortly after, the Count, who is terminally ill, dictates him his will according to which his daughter Gerda will inherit his entire estate including all properties, manors and castles, while his second wife Helga will only inherit Devil's Field. Johannes then tells Helga she is the one he is in love with. He marries her after the Count's death.

Johannes goes to the city to discuss with a large company the exploitation of the oilfield. He refuses the sum of 25 million marks and convinces them to lend him the money so that he can exploit it himself. Meanwhile, his wife, desperate with his obsession with Devil's Field, sells the cursed land to Peter for twelve thousand marks. Johannes, furious, demands that she cancels the sales. Peter agrees, but the young woman, desperate that Johannes has never loved her, drowns herself in the river.

Gerda, who spitefully had got engaged to Baron von Lellewel is hoping to regain Johannes' love. But he tells her that he never loved either of the women and acted only by ambition. To avenge herself, Gerda sets fire to the rig that was installed on Devil's Field and dies in the ensuing explosion. Finally aware of the misfortunes he has caused, and of the vanity of his ambitions, Johannes returns to the farm where his brother and Maria, a country girl in love with him, had always been waiting for him.

== Cast ==
- Eugen Klöpfer – Peter Rog
- Vladimir Gajdarov – Johannes Rog
- Werner Krauss – Der alte Rog / Old Rog
- Eduard von Winterstein – Graf Rudenburg / Count Rudenburg
- Stella Arbenina – Helga, Rudenburgs zweite Frau / Helga, Rudenburg's 2nd wife
- Lya De Putti – Gerda, Rudenburgs Tochter / Gerda, Rudenburg's daughter
- Alfred Abel – Ludwig von Lellewel
- Grete Diercks – Maria
- Elsa Wagner – Magda
- Emilia Unda – Alte Magd / Old maid
- Leonie Taliansky – Gerdas Zofe / Gerda's maid
- Albert Patry
- Magnus Stifter
- Olga Engl

== See also ==
- List of German films of 1922
