= A Strange Guest =

1936 film

- German film poster
- German: Ein seltsamer Gast
- Directed by: Gerhard Lamprecht
- Written by: Kurt Heuser
- Produced by: Ernst Krüger; Hans Herbert Ulrich
- Starring: Alfred Abel; Ilse Petri; Kurt Fischer-Fehling
- Cinematography: Karl Hasselmann
- Edited by: Erich Palme
- Music by: Giuseppe Becce
- Production company: UFA
- Distributed by: UFA
- Release date: 8 April 1936
- Running time: 84 minutes
- Country: Germany
- Language: German

A Strange Guest (German: Ein seltsamer Gast) is a 1936 German drama film directed by Gerhard Lamprecht and starring Alfred Abel, Ilse Petri and Kurt Fischer-Fehling.

The film's sets were designed by the art directors Kurt Dürnhöfer and Otto Moldenhauer.

== Cast ==
- Alfred Abel as Bruneaux, art dealer
- Ilse Petri as Yvette, his daughter
- Kurt Fischer-Fehling as Henry de Valencours, Yvette's fiancé
- Franz Weber as Valencour's father
- Annemarie Steinsieck as Mutter de Valencours
- Fritz Odemar as Uncle Théophile
- Aribert Wäscher as Rompon
- Werner Scharf as René Morone, the blackmailer
- Elisabeth Wendt as Lou
- Eduard Wenck as hotel manager
- Eva Tinschmann as landlady
- Hermann Speelmans as Gaston, valet
- Johanna Blum as Jeanette, chambermaid
- Karl Falkenberg as Kellner Maurice
- Werner Stock as clerk
- Rudolf Klein-Rogge as Polizeipräfekt
- Hansjoachim Büttner as commissioner
- Bob Iller as detective #1
- Hermann Meyer-Falkow as detective #2
- Gerhard Dammann as Taxi driver
- Wolfram Anschütz
- Valy Arnheim as the servant at Bruneaux
- Johannes Bergfeldt as Gaspard, employee at Bruneaux
- Werner Bernhardy as guest
- Erwin Biegel as servant
- Colette Corder as Uncle Théophile's table lady at the engagement party
- Joe Münch-Harris as salesman
- Edgar Nollet
- Kurt Richards as secretary
- Olga Rumland as flower girl
- Maria Seidler as guest
- Ursula van Diemen
- Betty Waid as old lady at the engagement party
