= Gerhard Lamprecht =

German film director

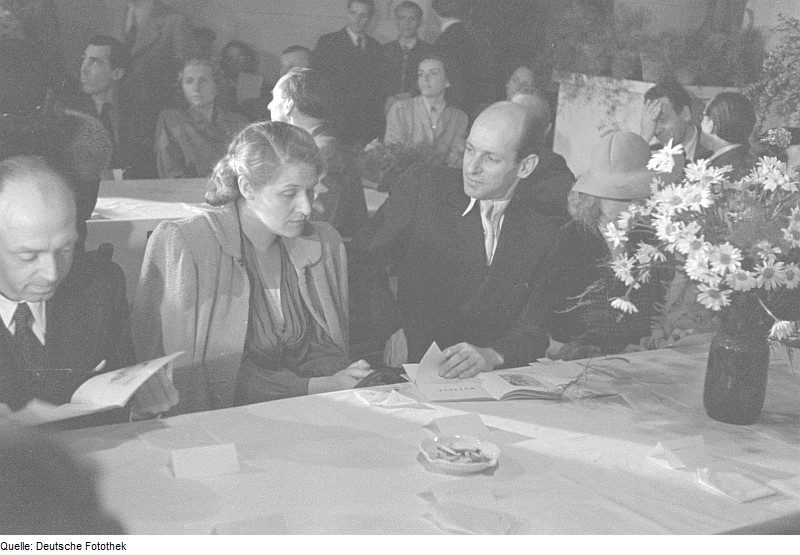
- Gerhard Lamprecht (far left) at the 1946 DEFA founding ceremony
- Born: 6 October 1897; Berlin, German Empire
- Died: 4 May 1974 (aged 76); West Berlin, West Germany
- Occupations: Film director; Screenwriter
- Years active: 1918–1958
- Spouse: Elisabeth Donath (m. 1923–1974)

Gerhard Lamprecht (6 October 1897 – 4 May 1974) was a German film director, screenwriter and film historian. He directed 63 films between 1920 and 1958. He also wrote for 26 films between 1918 and 1958.

== Life and career ==
Lamprecht was fascinated by cinema since his childhood and started to work as a film projectionist at age twelve. He studied theatre and art history in Berlin. He also took drama lessons with Paul Bildt and appeared as a stage actor under the name of "Gerhard Otto" in some minor productions. Lamprecht got drafted by the German army in 1917 and was wounded in 1918. Lamprecht had sold his first film manuscript as early as 1914. With the end of World War I, Lamprecht started to work as a screenwriter, notably for director Lupu Pick. Lamprecht's first film as a director was Es bleibt in der Familie. Despite his young age – he was still in his early 20s – Lamprecht won prestige during the following years. He was responsible for the first film adaption of Thomas Mann's "Buddenbrooks" in 1923. Among his most notable films during the 1920s are People to Each Other (1926), Under the Lantern (1928) and The Old Fritz (1928), the latter being a film adaption about Frederick the Great. Lamprecht also worked together with illustrator Heinrich Zille on a series of social realist films which depicted the authentic everyday life in Berlin.

Lamprecht made a successful transition to sound films. In 1931, he directed the internationally acclaimed Emil and the Detectives, an adaption of Erich Kästner's children's book with a screenplay by Billy Wilder. During Nazi Germany (1933–1945), Lamprecht tried to avoid making propaganda films for the State. He mostly directed crime films, melodramas and literature adaptions during that time. One of his most important works during that time was perhaps Madame Bovary (1937), a well-regarded adaption of Gustave Flaubert's book with Pola Negri in the title role. In 1946, Lamprecht made a so-called Trümmerfilm: Somewhere in Berlin, which dealt about the lives of children in the destroyed, post-war Berlin. Somewhere in Berlin was a huge triumph and Lamprecht remained in demand as a director, although his later films are often considered of somewhat lesser quality. Lamprecht's last film was the semidocumentary Menschen im Werk (1957). He was a member of the jury at the 8th Berlin International Film Festival.

Lamprecht owned an enormous collection of film artifacts, which he had collected since his youth. He sold his collection to the City of Berlin in 1962; and it became the founding basis for the Deutsche Kinemathek, a major museum about film and television in Germany whose founding was an idea by Lamprecht. Until 1966, he served as the first director of the Deutsche Kinemathek. Afterwards, Lamprecht worked on a film catalogue with the names of all German silent films. The ten-book-volume Katalogisierung der deutschen Stummfilme aus den Jahren 1903–1931 was published in 1970 and is still considered an important work for German film studies.

Lamprecht was married to Elisabeth Donath from 1923 until his death in 1974, aged 76. He is buried at the Waldfriedhof Zehlendorf in Berlin.

== Awards ==
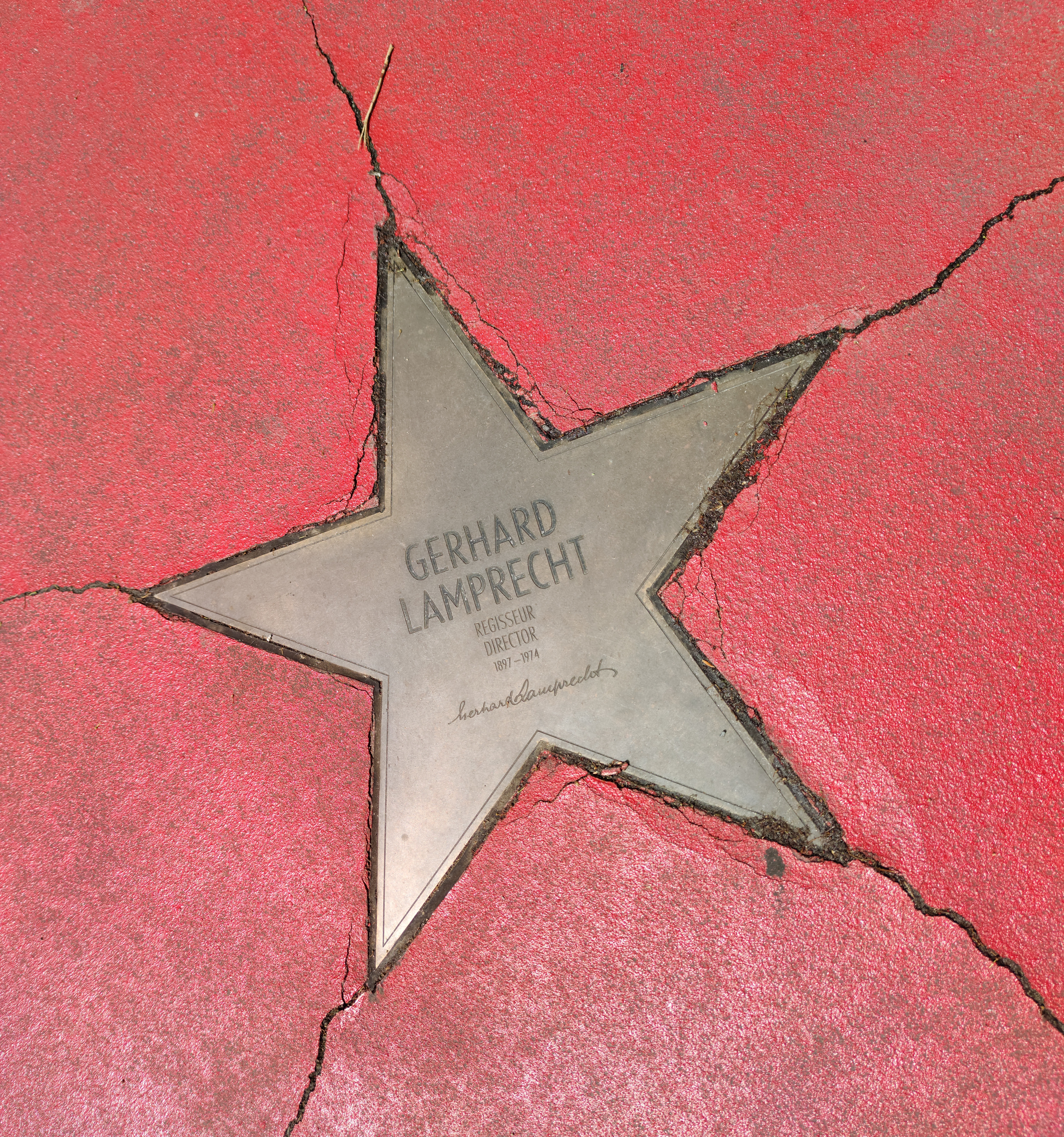
Lamprecht's star on the Boulevard der Stars in Berlin

Lamprecht was awarded the Order of Merit of the Federal Republic of Germany. In 1967, he was presented with the German Film Award for lifetime achievement ("Filmband in Gold").

== Selected filmography ==
- The Mirror of the World (1918, screenplay)
- Nobody Knows (1920, screenplay)
- The Graveyard of the Living (1921)
- The House Without Laughter (1923)
- And Yet Luck Came (1923)
- The Other Woman (1924)
- Slums of Berlin (1925)
- The Hanseatics (1925)
- Children of No Importance (1926)
- People to Each Other (1926)
- Sister Veronika (1927)
- The Catwalk (1927)
- The Old Fritz (1928)
- Under the Lantern (1928)
- The Man with the Frog (1929)
- Emil and the Detectives (1931)
- Different Morals (1931)
- Between Night and Dawn (1931)
- The Black Hussar (1932)
- Spies at Work (1933)
- What Men Know (1933)
- Just Once a Great Lady (1934)
- A Day Will Come (1934)
- Princess Turandot (1934)
- The Higher Command (1935)
- One Too Many on Board (1935)
- A Strange Guest (1936)
- Madame Bovary (1937)
- The Yellow Flag (1937)
- The Gambler (1938)
- Woman in the River (1939)
- The Girl at the Reception (1940)
- Clarissa (1941)
- Diesel (1942)
- The Noltenius Brothers (1945)
- Somewhere in Berlin (1946)
- Madonna in Chains (1949)
- Quartet of Five (1949)
- The Angel with the Flaming Sword (1954)
- Sergeant Borck (1955)
