= Unusable (film) =

1917 film

Inexpiable
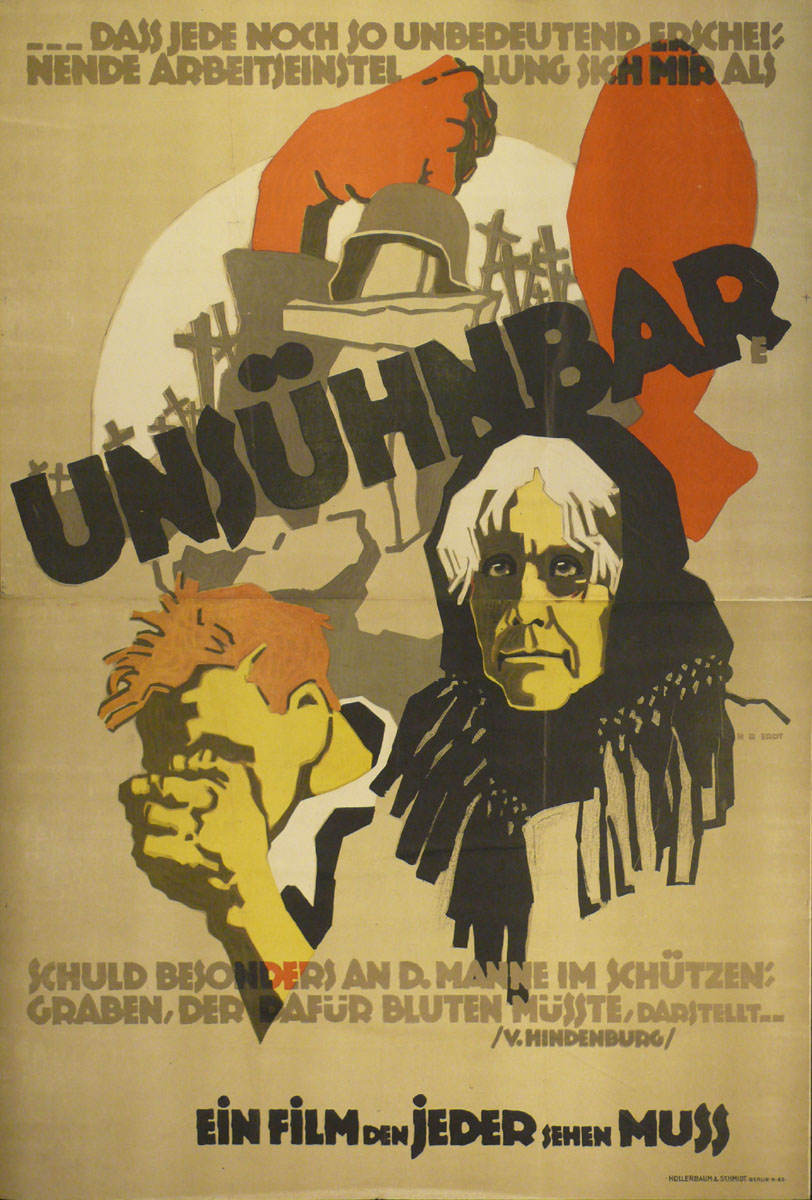
- German film poster
- German: Unsühnbar
- Directed by: Georg Jacoby
- Written by: Hans Brennert
- Produced by: Paul Davidson
- Starring: Adele Sandrock; Grete Diercks
- Production company: PAGU
- Distributed by: PAGU
- Release date: July 1917
- Running time: 55 minutes
- Country: Germany
- Languages: Silent; German intertitles

Unusable (German: Unsühnbar) is a 1917 German silent drama film directed by Georg Jacoby and starring Adele Sandrock and Grete Diercks.

It was shot at the Tempelhof Studios in Berlin.

== Cast ==
- Adele Sandrock as die Mutter
- Toni Zimmerer as ihr Sohn
- Johannes Müller as ihr Sohn
- Grete Diercks
