= Ilse Petri =

German actress (1918–2018)

- Born: 20 March 1918; Göttingen, German Empire
- Died: 3 February 2018 (aged 99); Munich, Germany
- Occupation: Actress
- Years active: 1935-1984 (TV)

Ilse Petri (20 March 1918 – 3 February 2018) was a German stage, television and film actress.

== Partial filmography ==
- April, April! (1935)
- Das Mädchen vom Moorhof (1935)
- Königstiger (1935)
- The Abduction of the Sabine Women (1936) - Paula Gollwitz
- A Strange Guest (1936) - Yvette - seine Tochter
- Thunder, Lightning and Sunshine (1936) - Evi, beider Tochter
- Monika (1938) - Inge, Monika's Friend
- Women for Golden Hill (1938) - Margaret
- Bel Ami (1939) - Zofe bei Frau von Marelle
- Men Are That Way (1939) - Direktions-Sekretärin
- Hochzeit mit Hindernissen (1939) - Trude, Lehmanns Tochter
- Who's Kissing Madeleine? (1939) - Suzette
- The Girl at the Reception (1940)
- Die verzauberte Prinzessin (1940)
- Heimaterde (1941)
- An Old Heart Becomes Young Again (1943) - Lotte Wendisch
- Seine beste Rolle (1944) - Hilde Röder
- The Degenhardts (1944)
- The Adventures of Fridolin (1948) - Marlen Weber - Malerin
- By a Nose (1949) - Lilly Mertens, Tänzerin
- Fanfares of Love (1951) - Sabine
- Eyes of Love (1951) - Milo Thiele
- Heute nacht passiert's (1953) - Frau Evchen Bräutigam
- Fanfare of Marriage (1953) - Sabine Schmidt
- Three Days Confined to Barracks (1955) - Dienstmädchen Bertha
- The Turkish Cucumbers (1962) - Petra, seine Frau
- Aunt Frieda (1965) - Frau Waschkühn
- Zur Hölle mit den Paukern (1968) - Mrs. Nietnagel

== Bibliography ==
- Goble, Alan. The Complete Index to Literary Sources in Film. Walter de Gruyter, 1999.
