= His Majesty the Hypochondriac =

1918 film

- German: Durchlaucht Hypochonder
- Directed by: Frederic Zelnik
- Written by: Ewald André Dupont
- Produced by: Frederic Zelnik
- Starring: Lisa Weise; Karl Beckersachs; Grete Diercks
- Production company: Berliner Film-Manufaktur
- Release date: 25 January 1918
- Running time: 66 minutes
- Country: Germany
- Languages: Silent; German intertitles

His Majesty the Hypochondriac (German: Durchlaucht Hypochonder) is a 1918 German silent comedy film directed by Frederic Zelnik and starring Lisa Weise, Karl Beckersachs, and Grete Diercks.

== Cast ==
- Lisa Weise as Serene Hypochondriac
- Karl Beckersachs as Husband of Serenity Hypochondriac
- Grete Diercks as Niece of Serenity
- Kurt Vespermann
- Jenny Marba
- Gustav Botz
- Aenderly Lebius
