= The Amazon (film) =

1921 film

- Eva May and Rudolf Forster
- Directed by: Richard Löwenbein
- Written by: Hans Gaus; Hans Herbert Ulrich (novel)
- Starring: Eva May; Rudolf Forster; Olga Engl
- Cinematography: Gustave Preiss
- Production company: Deulig Film
- Release date: 8 April 1921
- Country: Germany
- Languages: Silent; German intertitles

The Amazon (German: Die Amazone) is a 1921 German silent film directed by Richard Löwenbein and starring Eva May, Rudolf Forster, and Olga Engl.

The film's sets were designed by the art director Robert Neppach.

== Cast ==
- Eva May
- Rudolf Forster
- Olga Engl
- Ernst Stahl-Nachbaur
- Alfred Haase
- Josefine Dora
- Alfred Haase
- Adolf Klein
- Rudolf Klein-Rhoden
- Georg H. Schnell
- Hanna Gath

== Bibliography ==
- Bock, Hans-Michael; Bergfelder, Tim, eds. (2009). The Concise Cinegraph: Encyclopaedia of German Cinema. New York: Berghahn Books. ISBN 978-1-57181-655-9.
