= The Young Man from the Ragtrade =

1926 film

- Directed by: Richard Löwenbein
- Written by: Bobby E. Lüthge; Willy Prager
- Starring: Curt Bois; Maria Paudler; Frida Richard; Robert Garrison
- Cinematography: Eduard Hoesch
- Music by: Felix Bartsch
- Production company: Domo-Film
- Distributed by: Strauss Film
- Release date: 19 November 1926
- Country: Germany
- Languages: Silent; German intertitles

The Young Man from the Ragtrade (German: Der Jüngling aus der Konfektion) is a 1926 German silent comedy film directed by Richard Löwenbein and starring Curt Bois, Maria Paudler, and Frida Richard. Bois' character of an ambitious young man was closely modelled on the early film appearances of Ernst Lubitsch.

== Cast ==
- Curt Bois as Moritz Spiegel
- Maria Paudler as Karoline
- Frida Richard
- Robert Garrison
- Fred Louis Lerch
- Margarete Lanner
- Pia von Moosburg
- Claire Waldoff
- Kurt Vespermann
- Philipp Manning
- Johannes Riemann
- Albert Paulig
- Rudolf Lettinger
- Willy Prager
- Eva Speyer
- Sascha von Wanowska
- Hermann Picha

== Bibliography ==
- Prawer, Siegbert Salomon (2005). Between Two Worlds: The Jewish Presence in German and Austrian Film, 1910–1933. New York: Berghahn Books. ISBN 978-1-84545-074-8.
