= Count Cohn =

1923 film directed by Carl Boese

- Directed by: Carl Boese
- Written by: Mutz Greenbaum
- Based on: Count Cohn by Paul Langenscheidt
- Produced by: Viktor Klein
- Starring: Hermann Vallentin; Frida Richard; Bernd Aldor
- Cinematography: Mutz Greenbaum
- Production company: Hofbauer und Klein
- Distributed by: Hofbauer-Verleih
- Release date: 5 February 1924
- Running time: 90 minutes
- Country: Germany
- Languages: Silent; German intertitles

Count Cohn (German: Graf Cohn) is a 1923 German silent drama film directed by Carl Boese and starring Hermann Vallentin, Frida Richard and Bernd Aldor. The film's sets were designed by the art director Kurt Richter.

== Cast ==
- Hermann Vallentin as Siegfried Cohn
- Frida Richard as Frau Cohn
- Bernd Aldor as Isidor
- Elisabeth Pinajeff as Recha
- Grete Hollmann as Eva
- Rudolf Lettinger as Christian Schmidt
- Fritz Richard as Dr. Krause
- Olga Engl as Gräfin Thekla Holm
- Xenia Desni as Comtesse Dora
- Johannes Riemann as Baron Heinz von Sternau
- Albert Patry as Graf v. Klettingen
- Willy Kaiser-Heyl as Verlagsbuchhändler v. Gellert
- Max Willenz as Buchhalter Weller

== Bibliography ==
- Bock, Hans-Michael & Bergfelder, Tim. The Concise CineGraph. Encyclopedia of German Cinema. Berghahn Books, 2009.
