= The Fire Ship =

1922 film

- Directed by: Richard Löwenbein
- Written by: Rolf E. Vanloo
- Starring: Camilla von Hollay; Eduard von Winterstein; Viggo Larsen
- Cinematography: Conrad Wienecke
- Production company: Phoebus Film
- Release date: 8 December 1922
- Country: Germany
- Languages: Silent; German intertitles

The Fire Ship (German: Das Feuerschiff) is a 1922 German silent drama film directed by Richard Löwenbein and starring Camilla von Hollay, Eduard von Winterstein, and Viggo Larsen.

The film's sets were designed by the art director Jack Winter.

== Cast ==
- Camilla von Hollay
- Eduard von Winterstein
- Viggo Larsen
- Georg John
- Gustav von Wangenheim
- Wilhelm Diegelmann
- Grete Diercks

== Bibliography ==
- Grange, William (2008). Cultural Chronicle of the Weimar Republic. Lanham, MD: Scarecrow Press. ISBN 978-0-8108-5967-8.
