= Rose of the Asphalt Streets =

1922 film

- Directed by: Richard Löwenbein
- Written by: Hans Hyan
- Starring: Charlotte Böcklin; Robert Leffler; Olga Engl
- Cinematography: Conrad Wienecke
- Production company: Deulig-Verleih
- Distributed by: Deulig-Verleih
- Release date: 21 January 1922
- Country: Germany
- Languages: Silent; German intertitles

Rose of the Asphalt Streets (German: Die Asphaltrose) is a 1922 German silent drama film directed by Richard Löwenbein and starring Charlotte Böcklin, Robert Leffler, and Olga Engl.

The film's sets were designed by the art director Siegfried Wroblewsky.

== Cast ==
- Charlotte Böcklin as Hilde Brunn
- Robert Leffler as Alexander Harlach, Bankier
- Olga Engl as Harlachs Frau
- Kurt Middendorf as Fred Harlach, der Sohn
- Gustav Schmitt as Braun, Tischler
- Auguste Prasch-Grevenberg as Brauns Frau
- Kurt Seligmann as Kind
- Philipp Manning as Mr. Bullock, Millionär
- Helga Molander as Flory, Bullocks Tochter
- Paul Rehkopf as Paul Jefferson, Verbrecher
- Rudolf Klein-Rhoden as Verbrecher

== Bibliography ==
- Grange, William (2008). Cultural Chronicle of the Weimar Republic. Lanham, MD: Scarecrow Press. ISBN 978-0-8108-5967-8.
