= Rudolf Herzog =

German writer and journalist (1869–1943)

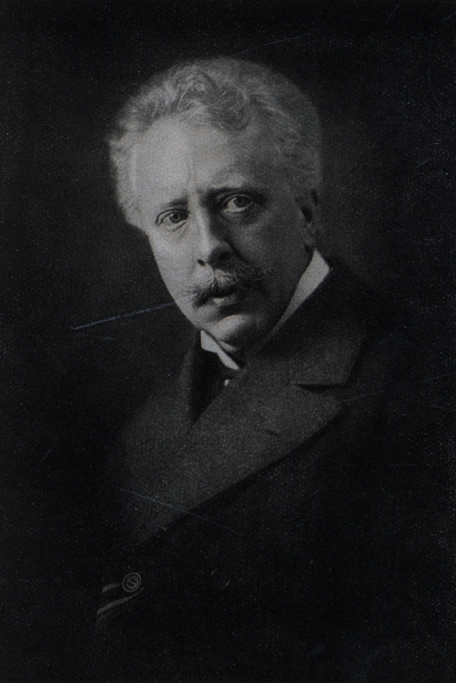
- Herzog in 1923
- Born: 6 December 1869; Barmen, Germany
- Died: 6 February 1943 (aged 73)
- Occupations: Writer; journalist

Rudolf Herzog (German: [ˈʁudɔlf ˈhɛɐˌtsoːk]; 6 December 1869 – 3 February 1943) was a German writer and journalist. He was highly popular as a novelist among the German middle class in the period before World War II, expressing Wilhelmian ideals and portraying artists and industrial families. He eventually supported the Nazi Party and fell into obscurity after the war.

== Life ==
Rudolf Herzog was born in Barmen on 6 December 1869. He participated in artists' circles in Düsseldorf, was trained as a colour technician in Elberfeld and attended philosophy lectures in Berlin and Frankfurt before he was able to pursue a career as a writer and journalist. He became cultural editor for Schwarz-Rot in 1894, editor-in-chief at the Hamburger Neueste Nachrichten in 1897 and was head of the culture section of the Berliner Neueste Nachrichten from 1899 to 1903. During this period he began to be published as an author. He participated in World War I in non-combat roles.

Herzog had some success as a poet and playwright, but primarily became known as a novelist. In the period before World War II, he was highly read among the German middle class, reaching a total circulation of around seven million sold books. His best known works include the novels Sons of the Rhine (German: Die Wiskottens) from 1905 and Die Stoltenkamps und ihre Frauen from 1917.

According to the Neue Deutsche Biographie, Herzog's works reflect the ideals of Wilhelmian Germany. His earliest works are post-Romanticist and typically portray artists. The later works portray industrial families and men of action, celebrating hard work, strength, national duties, patriarchal views of social responsibility, and tolerance in religious and erotic issues. The Neue Deutsche Biographie writes that these books are reminiscent of Wilhelm II in their language, by blending "sentimentality and harshness, pomp and plainness", and places them "in the no man's land between trivial literature and poetry".

Giving democratic forces the blame for Germany's defeat in World War I, Herzog became politically active in the Rheinische Heimatbund immediately after the war. He welcomed the NSDAP's seizure of power. In 1939 he was awarded the Goethe-Medaille für Kunst und Wissenschaft. He died in Rheinbreitbach on 3 February 1943. After World War II, he fell into obscurity.

== Works in English translation ==
- The Adventurer (Der Abenteurer), by J. W. Van Eyndhoven, Desmond FitzGerald 1912
- The Story of Helga (Das Lebenslied), by Adèle Lewisohn, E. P. Dutton & Co. 1913
- Sons of the Rhine (Die Wiskottens), by Louise T. Lazell, Desmond FitzGerald 1914

== Film adaptations ==
- In the Valleys of the Southern Rhine (1925)
- The Hanseatics (1925)
- The Adventurers (1926)
- The Wiskottens (1926)
- The Song of Life (1926)
