= Gustav Rickelt =

German actor

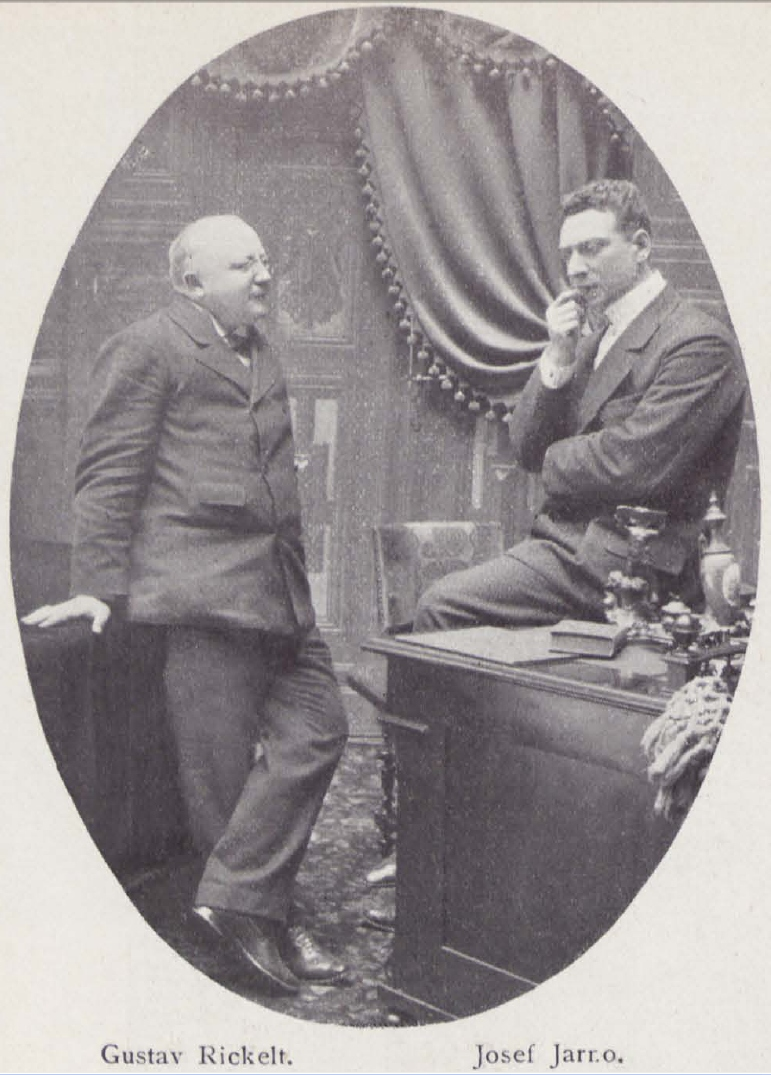
- Gustav Rickelt (1862-1946), German actor, director and author, and Josef Jarno, Austrian author. Recorded in 1899.
- Born: 21 June 1862; Dortmund, Kingdom of Prussia
- Died: 26 June 1946 (aged 84); Wessobrunn, Germany
- Occupation: Actor
- Years active: 1923–1936 (film)

Gustav Rickelt (1862–1946) was a German stage and film actor.

== Selected filmography ==
- Earth Spirit (1923)
- The Wiskottens (1926)
- Weekend Magic (1927)
- Lemke's Widow (1928)
- Youth of the Big City (1929)
- Bobby, the Petrol Boy (1929)
- The Old Song (1930)
- Flachsmann the Educator (1930)
- Father and Son (1930)
- The Fate of Renate Langen (1931)
- Sacred Waters (1932)
- Uncle Bräsig (1936)

== Bibliography ==
- Grange, William (2008). Cultural Chronicle of the Weimar Republic. Lanham, MD: Scarecrow Press. ISBN 978-0-8108-5967-8.
