= Bertold Reissig =

German actor

- Born: 25 November 1877; Hamburg, Germany
- Occupation: Actor
- Years active: 1918-1939 (film )

Bertold Reissig (born 25 November 1877) was a German stage and film actor.

== Selected filmography ==
- The Crazy Marriage of Laló (1918)
- The Mirror of the World (1918)
- People to Each Other (1926)
- Sister Veronika (1927)
- The Catwalk (1927)
- The Old Fritz (1928)
- Different Morals (1931)
- Chauffeur Antoinette (1932)
- Princess Turandot (1934)
- The Higher Command (1935)
- Across the Desert (1936)
- Madame Bovary (1937)
- Truxa (1937)
- Kitty and the World Conference (1939)

== Bibliography ==
- Goble, Alan. The Complete Index to Literary Sources in Film. Walter de Gruyter, 1999.
