= The Flame (1923 film) =

1923 film directed by Ernst Lubitsch

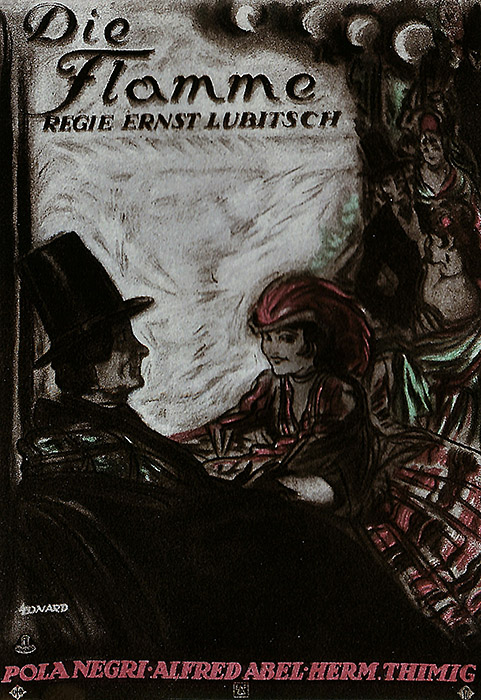
- German poster
- Directed by: Ernst Lubitsch
- Written by: Hans Müller (play); Hanns Kräly
- Starring: Pola Negri; Hermann Thimig; Alfred Abel; Hilde Wörner
- Cinematography: Alfred Hansen; Theodor Sparkuhl
- Production company: PAGU
- Distributed by: UFA; Paramount Pictures (US)
- Release date: September 11, 1923
- Running time: 9 reels
- Country: Germany
- Languages: Silent; German intertitles

The Flame (German: Die Flamme) is a 1923 German silent drama film directed by Ernst Lubitsch and starring Pola Negri, Hermann Thimig, and Alfred Abel. The film is based on a play by Hans Müller. In the United States it was released under the alternative title Montmartre. It was the last film Lubitsch made in Germany before emigrating to Hollywood where he directed his first American film Rosita for United Artists the same year.

Full film

== Plot ==
As described in a film magazine review for the English subtitled version, Yvette's landlady insists that her lodger pay up the money she owes. The young woman goes out in quest of funds. Papa Lemonier is about to "come across" with the desired cash, when a man who has been pursuing her interferes and trouble starts. Yvette runs away and makes the acquaintance of a youthful composer named Andre Leduc. They fall in love and are married. Raoul Fournier, a rejected suitor, tries to spoil Yvette's domestic happiness by exposing her past to her husband. He almost succeeds, but is defeated in the long run.

== Cast ==
- Pola Negri as Yvette
- Hermann Thimig as Adolphe
- Alfred Abel as Gaston
- Hilde Wörner as Louise
- Frida Richard as Madame Vasal
- Jakob Tiedtke as Monsieur Borell
- Max Adalbert as Journalist
- Ferdinand von Alten as Mann von Welt
- Jenny Marba as Adolphes Mutter

== Bibliography ==
- Eyman, Scott (2000). Ernst Lubitsch: Laughter in Paradise. Johns Hopkins University Press. ISBN 0-8018-6558-1
