= Max Nemetz =

German actor

- Max Nemetz as the Captain in Nosferatu (1922)
- Born: Max Nemetz; September 7, 1886; Bremen, German Empire
- Died: July 2, 1971 (aged 84); Bad Herrenalb, West Germany

Max Nemetz (7 September 1886 – 2 July 1971) was a German film and stage actor. He is best known for the role of the Captain in the 1922 silent film Nosferatu.

== Filmography ==
as actor:

- 1921: The Graveyard of the Living
- 1921: Marizza
- 1921: Nosferatu
- 1923: Man by the Wayside
- 1954: Roses from the South
- 1956: Philemon und Baucis
- 1963: Stadtpark
- 1966: Der Fall Rouger
- 1966: Das Mißverständniss
