= The Crazy Marriage of Laló =

- Directed by: Lupu Pick
- Written by: Lupu Pick; Fanny Carlsen
- Produced by: Lupu Pick
- Cinematography: Ivar Petersen
- Production company: Rex-Film
- Distributed by: Rex-Film
- Release date: 1 November 1918
- Country: Germany
- Languages: Silent; German intertitles

The Crazy Marriage of Laló (German:Die tolle Heirat von Laló) is a 1918 German silent film directed by Lupu Pick.

== Cast ==
In alphabetical order

- Bernd Aldor
- Alfred Beierle
- Erra Bognar
- Franz Groß
- Rudolf Hofbauer
- Agda Nilsson
- Ernst Pittschau
- Bertold Reissig

== Bibliography ==
- Jill Nelmes & Jule Selbo. Women Screenwriters: An International Guide. Palgrave Macmillan, 2015.
