= The Chain Clinks =

1923 film directed by Paul L. Stein

- Scene from a film
- German: Die Kette klirrt
- Directed by: Paul L. Stein
- Written by: Friedrich Werner van Oestéren
- Produced by: Albert Pommer
- Starring: Ressel Orla; Alfons Fryland; Grete Diercks
- Cinematography: Erich Waschneck
- Production company: Dea-Film
- Release date: 13 March 1923
- Country: Germany
- Languages: Silent; German intertitles

The Chain Clinks (German: Die Kette klirrt) is a 1923 German silent film directed by Paul L. Stein and starring Ressel Orla, Alfons Fryland, and Grete Diercks.

The film's sets were designed by the art director Fritz Lederer.

== Cast ==
- Ressel Orla
- Alfons Fryland
- Grete Diercks
- Kurt Brenkendorf
- Leonhard Haskel
- Hans Merkwitz
- Ursula Nest
- Frida Richard
- Fritz Richard
- Eduard Rothauser
- Walter Steinbeck
