= The Diadem of the Czarina =

1922 film

- Directed by: Richard Löwenbein
- Written by: Richard Löwenbein; Paul O'Montis
- Starring: Eduard von Winterstein; Dora Bergner; Carl Auen
- Cinematography: Conrad Wienecke
- Production company: Deulig-Verleih
- Release date: 24 March 1922
- Country: Germany
- Languages: Silent; German intertitles

The Diadem of the Czarina (German: Das Diadem der Zarin) is a 1922 German silent historical film directed by Richard Löwenbein and starring Eduard von Winterstein, Dora Bergner, and Carl Auen.

== Cast ==
- Eduard von Winterstein
- Dora Bergner
- Carl Auen
- Alwin Neuß
- Lilly Flohr
- Rudolf Klein-Rhoden
- Harry Lamberts-Paulsen

== Bibliography ==
- Grange, William (2008). Cultural Chronicle of the Weimar Republic. Lanham, MD: Scarecrow Press. ISBN 978-0-8108-5967-8.
