= Rudolf Klein-Rhoden =

German actor

Rudolf Klein-Rhoden (27 January 1871 – 5 January 1936) was a German stage and film actor.

== Selected filmography ==
- Madeleine (1919)
- Sins of the Parents (1919)
- Intoxication (1919)
- Prostitution (1919)
- Indische Nächte (1919)
- Hypnosis (1920)
- The Closed Chain (1920)
- Dancer of Death (1920)
- The Yellow Death (1920)
- The House of Torment (1921)
- Das gestohlene Millionenrezept (1921)
- The Amazon (1921)
- The Golden Plague (1921)
- The Black Spider (1921)
- Marie Antoinette, the Love of a King (1922)
- The Diadem of the Czarina (1922)
- The Moneylender's Daughter (1922)
- The Flight into Marriage (1922)
- The Romance of a Poor Sinner (1922)
- Rose of the Asphalt Streets (1922)
- Sunken Worlds (1922)
- Friedrich Schiller (1923)
- The Beautiful Girl (1923)
- Resurrection (1923)
- The Third Watch (1924)
- The Enchantress (1924)
- The Dice Game of Life (1925)
- The Man on the Comet (1925)
- Struggle for the Soil (1925)
- Harry Hill, Lord of the World (1925)
- The Circus Princess (1925)
- State Attorney Jordan (1926)
- At Ruedesheimer Castle There Is a Lime Tree (1928)
- A Love, A Thief, A Department Store (1928)
- Fight of the Tertia (1929)
- Roses Bloom on the Moorland (1929)
