= Fritz Richard =

Austrian actor and theatre director

- Born: Josef Richard Löwit; 17 November 1869; Chotieborsch, Austria-Hungary (now, Chotěboř, Czech Republic)
- Died: 9 February 1933 (aged 63); Berlin, Germany
- Occupations: Actor, theatre director
- Years active: 1886–1933
- Spouse(s): Frida Richard (née Friederike Raithel; 1898–1933)
- Children: 3

Fritz Richard (born Josef Richard Löwit; 17 November 1869 – 9 February 1933) was an Austrian actor and theatre director.

Fritz Richard was born as Josef Richard Löwit in Chotěboř, Austria-Hungary into a Jewish family.

Richard trained as a stenographer and took acting lessons in Vienna at the Pauline Loewe Theatre School. His first engagement as a stage actor was in Mülheim in 1886. He then appeared at various Austrian and German provincial theatres.

From Metz in 1905 his path took him to Berlin, where he mainly worked at the Deutsches Theater and the Lessing Theater. He was part of Max Reinhardt's ensemble. He was particularly successful in Karl Schönherr's Der Weibsteufel and as Jedermann. From 1913 Richard also took part in numerous silent films.

Richard married his fellow student Friederike Raithel in 1898, who later also became an actress under the name Frida Richard. Richard died in Berlin shortly after Adolf Hitler came to power. After his death, rumours circulated that he had murdered by the Gestapo.

== Selected filmography ==
- The Armoured Vault (1914)
- Die geheimnisvolle Villa (1914)
- The Mirror of the World (1918)
- Love (1919)
- Baccarat (1919)
- The Blockhead (1921)
- Alfred von Ingelheim's Dramatic Life (1921)
- The Graveyard of the Living (1921)
- A Dying Nation (1922)
- Lola Montez, the King's Dancer (1922)
- Duke Ferrante's End (1922)
- Lumpaci the Vagabond (1922)
- Count Cohn (1923)
- Friend Ripp (1923)
- The Ancient Law (1923)
- Felicitas Grolandin (1923)
- The Chain Clinks (1923)
- The Beautiful Girl (1923)
- The Woman Who Did (1925)
- The Telephone Operator (1925)
- Anne-Liese of Dessau (1925)
- Peter the Pirate (1925)
- The Most Beautiful Legs of Berlin (1927)
- The Eighteen Year Old (1927)
- The False Prince (1927)
- The Prince of Rogues (1928)
- The Little Slave (1928)
- Fight of the Tertia (1929)
- Retreat on the Rhine (1930)

== Bibliography ==
- Eisner, Lotte H. The Haunted Screen: Expressionism in the German Cinema and the Influence of Max Reinhardt. University of California Press, 2008.
