= Baccarat (1919 film) =

1919 film

- Directed by: Josef Ewald; Bob Holste
- Written by: Josef Ewald; Karl Wilczynski
- Starring: Ludwig Hartau; Reinhold Schünzel
- Cinematography: Ivar Petersen
- Production company: Brandenburgische Film
- Distributed by: Brandenburgische Film
- Release date: 1919
- Country: Germany
- Languages: Silent; German intertitles

Baccarat is a 1919 German silent drama film directed by Josef Ewald and Bob Holste and starring Ludwig Hartau and Reinhold Schünzel. It premiered at the Marmorhaus in Berlin.

== Cast ==
In alphabetical order

- Ernst Josef Aufricht as Maler Heinz Bergmann
- Blandine Ebinger
- Kurt Ehrle
- Max Gülstorff
- Ludwig Hartau as Grosskaufmann Hansen
- Marga Köhler
- Stella May as Lulu
- Ida Orloff
- Frida Richard
- Fritz Richard
- Ferdinand Robert
- Edgar Sandrock
- Reinhold Schünzel
- Hans Heinrich von Twardowski
- Molly Wessely as Hansi

== Bibliography ==
- Bock, Hans-Michael; Bergfelder, Tim, eds. (2009). The Concise Cinegraph: Encyclopaedia of German Cinema. New York: Berghahn Books. ISBN 978-1-57181-655-9.
