= Bobby, the Petrol Boy =

1929 film directed by Carl Boese

- Directed by: Carl Boese
- Written by: Lutz Völker
- Produced by: Carl Boese
- Starring: Gustav Rickelt; Sophie Pagay; Ruth Weyher
- Cinematography: Alfred Hansen
- Music by: Hansheinrich Dransmann
- Production company: Carl Boese-Film
- Distributed by: Deutsche First National Pictures
- Release date: 2 September 1929
- Running time: 93 minutes
- Country: Germany
- Languages: Silent; German intertitles

Bobby, the Petrol Boy (German: Bobby, der Benzinjunge) is a 1929 German silent drama film directed by Carl Boese and starring Gustav Rickelt, Sophie Pagay, and Ruth Weyher. It was shot at the National Studios in Berlin. The film's sets were designed by the art director Otto Moldenhauer. It was distributed by the German branch of First National Pictures.

== Cast ==
- Gustav Rickelt as Anton Weber
- Sophie Pagay as Emilie Weber, seine Frau
- Bobby Burns as Bobby, Pflegekind der Webers
- Eduard Rothauser as Prof. Junghans, Maler
- Ruth Weyher as Ellen, seine Tochter
- Livio Pavanelli as Dr. Martens, Arzt

== Bibliography ==
- Holmstrom, John (1996). The Moving Picture Boy: An International Encyclopaedia from 1895 to 1995. Norwich: Michael Russell. ISBN 978-0-85955-178-6.
