= And Yet Luck Came =

1923 film

- Directed by: Gerhard Lamprecht
- Written by: Gerhard Lamprecht
- Starring: Grete Diercks; Eduard Rothauser; Heinrich Schroth
- Cinematography: Ivar Petersen
- Production company: Kinomarkt
- Distributed by: Kinomarkt
- Release date: 30 March 1923
- Country: Germany
- Languages: Silent; German intertitles

And Yet Luck Came (German: Und dennoch kam das Glück) is a 1923 German silent film directed by Gerhard Lamprecht and starring Grete Diercks, Eduard Rothauser and Heinrich Schroth. The film's sets were designed by the art director Otto Moldenhauer.

== Cast ==
- Grete Diercks
- Eduard Rothauser
- Heinrich Schroth
- Karl Hannemann
- Frida Richard
- Ernst Gronau
- Martha Maria Newes
- Alice Torning
- Hubert Jarosch

== Bibliography ==
- Bock, Hans-Michael; Bergfelder, Tim, eds. (2009). The Concise Cinegraph: Encyclopaedia of German Cinema. New York: Berghahn Books. ISBN 978-1-57181-655-9.
