= Marizza =

1920 film

- Poster
- Directed by: F. W. Murnau
- Written by: Wolfgang Geiger; Hans Janowitz
- Produced by: Erwin Rosner
- Starring: Tzwetta Tzatschewa
- Cinematography: Karl Freund
- Production company: Helios Film
- Release date: 20 January 1922
- Running time: 50 minutes
- Country: Germany
- Languages: Silent; German intertitles

Marizza (full title Marizza, called the Smuggler Madonna, German: Marizza, genannt die Schmugglermadonna) is a 1922 silent German drama film directed by F. W. Murnau. The film is considered to be lost, though the Cineteca Nazionale film archive possesses a fragmentary print of the first reel. It was shot at the Johannisthal Studios in Berlin. The film's sets were designed by the art director Heinrich Richter.

== Plot ==
Marizza (Tzwetta Tzatschewa) is a beautiful young woman who works as a potato-picker on a farm owned by an old woman, Yelina (Maria Forescu). They are forced to sell their potatoes to Pietro Scarzella (Leonhard Haskel), a wealthy merchant who has a monopoly on the potato market and takes advantage of all the farmers. To avoid the low prices Scarzella offers, Yelina often sells her potatoes to smugglers. Marizza flirts with smugglers Mirko (Albrecht Viktor Blum) and Grischuk (Max Nemetz) so they will take Yelina's crop. The local police officer, Haslinger (Toni Zimmerer), loves Marizza and is too distracted by her to stop the smugglers.

Marizza takes a new job on a farm owned by an impoverished aristocrat, Mrs. Avricolos (Adele Sandrock). Mrs. Avricolos has two sons, the fiery and impulsive Christo (Harry Frank) and the dreamy and scholarly Antonino (Hans Heinrich von Twardowski). Both men fall for Marizza. However, Sadja (Greta Schröder), Scarzella's daughter, is in love with Christo, and if they marry it will save the bankrupt Avricolos farm from Scarzella, to whom Mrs. Avricolos owns a great deal of money. When Mrs. Avricolos finds Marizza talking to Christo in his bedroom late one night, she throws Marizza off the premises.

Marizza runs off with Antonino, while Christo agrees to marry Sadja. Mrs. Avricolos hires Mirko and Grischuk to find the runaway lovers. The smugglers find the two living in a frontier village. Both are near starvation and Marizza has an infant. Haslinger, newly appointed to the frontier town, spots Mirko and Grischuk and tries to arrest them. Marizza flirts with Haslinger to distract him while Mirko and Grischuk get away. Overcome with jealousy, Antonino attempts to kill Haslinger. To save Antonino from life in prison for assaulting an officer, Marizza kills Haslinger.

More police arrive just after the murder. Antonino tells the police that he killed Haslinger, and is thrown in prison anyway. To save himself, Mirko tells the police that Scarzella is the brains behind the smuggling operation, and Scarzella is arrested.

Screenshot

Marizza returns to her home village with her child, and leaves it with Yelina. When soldiers arrive to burn the cottages of all the smugglers, they set fire to Yelina's home as well. Sadja warns Marizza, who flees into the burning house to save her baby. Christo rescues them both.

== Cast ==
- Tzwetta Tzatschewa as Marizza
- Adele Sandrock as Mrs. Avricolos
- Harry Frank as Christo
- Hans Heinrich von Twardowski as Antonino
- Leonhard Haskel as Pietro Scarzella
- Greta Schröder as Sadja, Scarzella's daughter
- Maria Forescu as Old Yelina
- Max Nemetz as Grischuk
- Toni Zimmerer as Gendarme Haslinger
- Albrecht Viktor Blum as Mirko Vasics

== See also ==
- List of lost films
