= The Woman Who Did (1925 film) =

1925 film

- Directed by: Benjamin Christensen
- Written by: Grant Allen (novel)
- Produced by: Erich Pommer
- Starring: Lionel Barrymore; Gustav Fröhlich; Alexandra Sorina; Daisy Campbell
- Cinematography: Carl Hoffmann
- Production company: UFA
- Distributed by: UFA
- Release date: 18 December 1925
- Country: Germany
- Languages: Silent; German intertitles

The Woman Who Did (German: Die Frau mit dem schlechten Ruf, English: The Woman with the Bad Reputation) is a 1925 German silent drama film directed by Benjamin Christensen and starring Lionel Barrymore, Gustav Fröhlich and Alexandra Sorina. It was an adaptation of the 1895 British novel The Woman Who Did by Grant Allen. The film's art direction was by Hans Jacoby.

== Cast ==
- Lionel Barrymore as Allan Merrick
- Gustav Fröhlich as James Compson
- Alexandra Sorina as Herminia Barton
- Daisy Campbell as Frau Merrick
- Marian Alma as Diener
- Walter Bruckmann as Tadeo
- Danielowitsch as Kind
- Dembot as Detektiv
- Hertha Müller as Backfisch
- Frida Richard as Alte Frau
- Fritz Richard as Alter Mann
- Mathilde Sussin as Frau Compson
- Robert Taube as Mr. Compson
- Eugenie Teichgräber as Dolores

== Bibliography ==
- Bergfelder, Tim & Bock, Hans-Michael. The Concise Cinegraph: Encyclopedia of German. Berghahn Books, 2009.
- Hardt, Ursula. From Caligari to California: Erich Pommer's Life in the International Film Wars. Berghahn Books, 1996.
