= The Adventures of Fridolin =

1948 film

- Directed by: Wolfgang Staudte
- Starring: Axel von Ambesser; Ilse Petri; Hubert von Meyerinck
- Release date: 1948
- Country: East Germany
- Language: German

The Adventures of Fridolin (German: Die seltsamen Abenteuer des Herrn Fridolin B.) is an East German film. It was released in 1948.
