= Richard Löwenbein =

Austrian director

- Born: 29 June 1894; Vienna, Austro-Hungarian Empire
- Died: September 1943 (aged 49); Auschwitz, Occupied Poland
- Occupations: Director, Writer
- Years active: 1914–1933 (film)

Richard Löwenbein (1894–1943) was an Austrian screenwriter and film director. He was active in the German film industry during the Weimar Republic. The Jewish Löwenbein left Germany for France following the Nazi Party's rise to power in 1933. After Germany occupied France in 1940 he was arrested and held at the Drancy internment camp before being transported to Auschwitz where he was killed.

== Selected filmography ==
- The Amazon (1921)
- Rose of the Asphalt Streets (1922)
- The Fire Ship (1922)
- The Golden Net (1922)
- Two Worlds (1922)
- The Diadem of the Czarina (1922)
- The Young Man from the Ragtrade (1926)
- The Crazy Countess (1928)
- Misled Youth (1929)

== Bibliography ==
- Prawer, Siegbert Salomon (2007) [2005]. Between Two Worlds: The Jewish Presence in German and Austrian Film, 1910–1933. New York: Berghahn Books. ISBN 978-1-84545-303-9.
