= Tragedy of a Marriage =

1927 film

- Directed by: Maurice Elvey
- Written by: Emmi Elert (novel); Ruth Goetz; Maurice Krol
- Produced by: Paul Ebner; Maxim Galitzenstein
- Starring: Isobel Elsom; Alfred Abel; Paul Richter
- Cinematography: Mutz Greenbaum
- Production company: Maxim-Film
- Distributed by: UFA; Astra-National (UK)
- Release date: 28 February 1927
- Running time: 82 minutes
- Country: Germany
- Languages: Silent; German intertitles

Tragedy of a Marriage (German: Tragödie einer Ehe) is a 1927 German silent drama film directed by Maurice Elvey and starring Isobel Elsom, Alfred Abel and Paul Richter. It is also known by the alternative title of Human Law. It is still extant.

The film's sets were designed by the art director Artur Günther and Ernst Stern.

== Cast ==
- Isobel Elsom as Louise Radcliffe
- Alfred Abel as Radcliffe
- Paul Richter as Mason
- Eduard von Winterstein
- Frida Richard
- Ernö Verebes

== Bibliography ==
- Bock, Hans-Michael & Bergfelder, Tim. The Concise CineGraph. Encyclopedia of German Cinema. Berghahn Books, 2009.
