= The Crazy Countess =

1928 film

- Directed by: Richard Löwenbein
- Written by: Rudolf Bernauer (libretto); Max Ehrlich; Rudolph Schanzer (libretto)
- Produced by: Richard Eichberg
- Starring: Ralph Arthur Roberts; Werner Fuetterer; Hanni Weisse
- Cinematography: Bruno Mondi; Hugo von Kaweczynski
- Music by: Hansheinrich Dransmann
- Production company: Richard Eichberg-Film
- Distributed by: Süd-Film
- Release date: 27 November 1928
- Country: Germany
- Languages: Silent; German intertitles

The Crazy Countess (German: Die tolle Komtess) is a 1928 German silent film directed by Richard Löwenbein and starring Ralph Arthur Roberts, Werner Fuetterer, and Hanni Weisse. It was based on an operetta of the same title.

The film's art direction was by Max Heilbronner.

== Cast ==
- Ralph Arthur Roberts as Graf Justus von Hagenau
- Werner Fuetterer as Graf Walter von Hagenau, sein Neffe
- Hanni Weisse as Gräfin Karla von Kesselstein
- Dina Gralla as Komtesse Jutta von Kesselstein, ihre Tochter
- Tilla Garden as Die Zofe Nelly
- Max Ehrlich as Schornstein, Heiratsvermittler
- Paul Hörbiger as Friseur Kose

== Bibliography ==
- Goble, Alan (1999). The Complete Index to Literary Sources in Film. Berlin: Walter de Gruyter. ISBN 978-3-11-095194-3.
