= Brigitte Rau =

German actress (1933–1979)

Brigitte Rau (31 December 1933 – 24 September 1979) was a German actress.

== Life ==
Brigitte Rau was born on the last day of 1933, the daughter of Otto Kurt Rau and Martha Adele Örtel. She appeared as an actress on stage, but she mainly became known through movies and television movies. Rau often took part in comedies and music movies.

She had her first film role in 1952 in the family movie Fight of the Tertia. In 1954 she married her professional colleague Gunnar Möller with whom she was seen in the same year in the music movie Love and Trumpets.

She continued her acting career after her marriage under her birth name. From her marriage with Gunnar Möller she had three children.

Under the direction of Peter Beauvais she played in Ist Mama nicht fabelhaft? in 1958. She also acted at the side of her husband, so in Familie Werner auf Reisen, a TV series. Here she gave Brigitte Werner, wife of Hans Werner, the student councillor, whom her husband impersonated.

In the TV series Die Gäste des Felix Hechinger (directed by Rolf von Sydow) Brigitte Rau played the role of Monika Lenz, in the series part Ehe in Gefahr her husband played her husband Peter Lenz.

In the 1970s, Gunnar Möller and Brigitte Rau appeared predominantly together in theatre productions, among others also at the Landesbühne Hannover. In 1977 they both appeared on stage in Heinz Coubier's comedy Aimée directed by Helmut Käutner.

== Circumstances of death ==
Memorial stone for Brigitte Rau at St John-at-Hampstead.

In 1979, Möller killed the 45-year-old actress in London because she wanted to get divorced from him. At that time, the couple's marriage was already considered to be disrupted by affairs, alcohol and disputes. The family had previously changed residence several times before settling in the Hampstead district of London's artists.

After the crime, Möller turned himself in to the police. His case was tried in court in London, and the actor was sentenced to five years in prison, of which he served two years.

== Selected filmography ==
- Fight of the Tertia (1952)
- Christina (1953)
- Annie from Tharau (1954)
- Money from the Air (1954)
- A Life for Do (1954)
- Love and Trumpets (1954)
- Ball at the Savoy (1955)
- The Ambassador (1960)
- Oh! This Bavaria! (1960)
