= Manole River =

Manole River may refer to:

- Manole River (Bâsca Chiojdului)
- Valea lui Manole River
- Izvorul lui Manole River

== See also ==
- Manole (name)
