= The Graveyard of the Living =

1921 film

- German: Der Friedhof der Lebenden
- Directed by: Gerhard Lamprecht
- Written by: Luise Heilborn-Körbitz; Gerhard Lamprecht
- Starring: Guido Herzfeld; Hanni Weisse
- Cinematography: Walter Weiße
- Production company: Pharos-Film
- Distributed by: Albert Löwenberg
- Release date: 18 May 1921
- Country: Germany
- Languages: Silent; German intertitles

The Graveyard of the Living (German: Der Friedhof der Lebenden) is a 1921 German silent film directed by Gerhard Lamprecht and starring Guido Herzfeld and Hanni Weisse.

The film's sets were designed by the art director Otto Moldenhauer.

== Cast ==
- Wilhelm Diegelmann
- Eva Düren
- Eve Düren
- Peter Esser
- Ernst Gronau
- Paul Günther
- Karl Hannemann
- Guido Herzfeld
- Gerhard Lamprecht
- Max Nemetz
- Walter Redlich
- Frida Richard
- Fritz Richard
- Gustav Roos
- Eduard Rothauser
- Wilhelm Völcker
- Hanni Weisse
- Aribert Wäscher
