= Intoxication (film) =

1919 film directed by Ernst Lubitsch

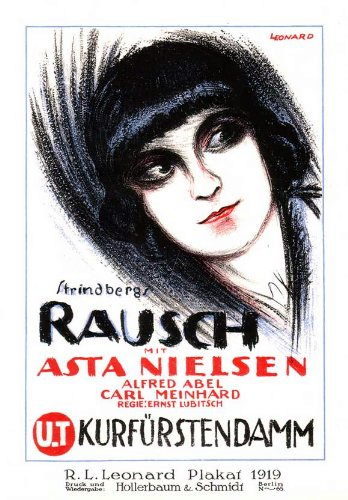
- Directed by: Ernst Lubitsch
- Written by: August Strindberg (play); Hanns Kräly
- Starring: Asta Nielsen; Alfred Abel; Karl Meinhardt; Grete Diercks
- Cinematography: Karl Freund; Theodor Sparkuhl
- Production company: Argus-Film
- Release date: 1 October 1919
- Running time: 6 reels
- Country: Germany
- Languages: Silent; German intertitles

Intoxication (German: Rausch) is a 1919 German silent drama film directed by Ernst Lubitsch and starring Asta Nielsen, Alfred Abel and Karl Meinhardt. It was based on the play Brott och brott (There are crimes and crimes) by August Strindberg, which was later remade as the 1928 film Sin. Lubitsch was loaned out by UFA to the smaller Argus-Film for the production.

Only a 13-minute fragment of the film, kept in the Bundesarchiv in Germany, is known to have survived.

== Plot ==
Gaston finally succeeds as a dramatist and decides to leave his wife and child for another woman. When the child dies, the finger is pointed at him, and he winds up as a destitute before all is revealed.

== Cast ==
- Asta Nielsen as Henriette Mauclerc
- Alfred Abel as Gaston, ein Schriftsteller
- Karl Meinhardt as Adolph
- Grete Diercks as Jeanne
- Rudolf Klein-Rhoden as Untersuchungsrichter
- Frida Richard as Haushälterin
- Marga Köhler as Henriettes Mutter
- Sophie Pagay as Mutter Kathrin
- Heinz Stieda as Der Abbé

== Bibliography ==
- Eyman, Scott. Ernst Lubitsch: Laughter in Paradise. Johns Hopkins University Press, 2000.
- Hake, Sabine. Passions and Deceptions: The Early Films of Ernst Lubitsch. Princeton University Press, 1992.
