= The Sun of St. Moritz (1923 film) =

1923 film

- German: Die Sonne von St. Moritz
- Directed by: Hubert Moest; Friedrich Weissenberg
- Written by: Paul Oskar Höcker (novel); Georg Kiesau
- Produced by: Friedrich Weissenberg
- Starring: Hedda Vernon; Grete Diercks
- Cinematography: Anton Mülleneisen
- Production company: Aladin-Film-Company
- Distributed by: Deutsche Vereins-Film
- Release date: 1923
- Country: Germany
- Languages: Silent; German intertitles

The Sun of St. Moritz (German: Die Sonne von St. Moritz) is a 1923 German silent drama film directed by Hubert Moest and Friedrich Weissenberg and starring Hedda Vernon and Grete Diercks. The film is based on a novel by Paul Oskar Höcker, and was remade in 1954 as The Sun of St. Moritz.

The film's art direction was by Fritz Lederer.

== Cast ==
In alphabetical order

- Emil Albes
- Paul Bildt
- Thea Bingner
- Grete Diercks
- Rudolf Forster
- Heinrich George
- Hannes Gungowski
- Karl Harbacher
- Willy Kaiser-Heyl
- Oscar Marion
- Albert Paulig
- Karl Victor Plagge
- Anton Pointner
- Johannes Riemann
- Gustav Adolf Semler
- Hedda Vernon
- Marie von Buelow
- Hans Wassmann
- Gustav Wilfan
