= Weekend Magic =

1927 film

- Directed by: Rudolf Walther-Fein
- Written by: Franz Rauch
- Produced by: Gabriel Levy
- Starring: Harry Liedtke; Lissy Arna; Gustav Rickelt
- Cinematography: Edoardo Lamberti; Guido Seeber
- Music by: Felix Bartsch
- Production company: Aafa-Film
- Distributed by: Aafa-Film
- Release date: 9 November 1927
- Running time: 101 minutes
- Country: Germany
- Languages: Silent; German intertitles

Weekend Magic (German: Wochenendzauber) is a 1927 German silent romance film directed by Rudolf Walther-Fein and starring Harry Liedtke, Lissy Arna and Gustav Rickelt. It was shot at the Staaken Studios in Berlin. The film's sets were designed by the art directors Botho Höfer and Hans Minzloff.

== Cast ==
- Harry Liedtke as Heinz Sattorius - Neffe Frensens
- Lissy Arna as Marcella Ferrari
- Gustav Rickelt as Jonathan Frensen - Kapitän a.D.
- Erich Kaiser-Titz as Justizrat Mahlau
- Margarete Kupfer as Witwe Lehmann
- Maria Paudler as Fritzi - ihre Tochter
- Fritz Kampers as Wilhelm - ihr Sohn
- Iwa Wanja as Annie Frenzel
- Carl Geppert as Hinnings - Jonathans Diener
- Olaf Storm as Ein junger Künstler
- Frida Richard as Die Wäscherin
- Sophie Pagay as Die Zimmervermieterin
- Hermann Picha as Der Badedirektor
- Heinrich Gotho as Der Eisverkäufer
- Alfred Loretto as Der Wurstmaxe
- Ita Rina

== Bibliography ==
- Grange, William. Cultural Chronicle of the Weimar Republic. Scarecrow Press, 2008.
