= Manole =

Manole is a Romanian name, used as both a given name and a surname. People with the given name include:

- Manole Aldescu
- Manole Marcus

People with the surname include:

- Laurențiu Manole
- Leonard Manole
- Mădălina Manole
- Viorel Manole

== See also ==
- Meșterul Manole
- Manole River (disambiguation)
- Manolescu (surname)
- Manoleasa, a commune in Botoșani County, Romania.
