= Manolescu (film) =

1929 film directed by Viktor Tourjansky

- Directed by: Viktor Tourjansky
- Written by: Robert Liebmann; Hans Székely (novel)
- Produced by: Noë Bloch; Gregor Rabinovitch
- Starring: Ivan Mozzhukhin; Brigitte Helm; Heinrich George
- Cinematography: Carl Hoffmann
- Music by: Willy Schmidt-Gentner
- Production company: UFA
- Distributed by: UFA
- Release date: 22 August 1929
- Running time: 124 minutes
- Country: Germany
- Languages: Silent; German intertitles

Manolescu (German: Manolescu - Der König der Hochstapler) is a 1929 German silent film directed by Viktor Tourjansky and starring Ivan Mozzhukhin, Brigitte Helm and Heinrich George. It was shot at the Babelsberg Studios in Berlin and on location in St. Moritz and Monte Carlo. The film's sets were designed by the art directors Robert Herlth and Walter Röhrig.

== Cast ==
- Ivan Mozzhukhin as Manolescu
- Brigitte Helm as Cleo
- Heinrich George as Jack
- Dita Parlo as Jeanette
- Harry Hardt
- Max Wogritsch
- Valy Arnheim
- Elsa Wagner
- Fritz Alberti
- Boris de Fast
- Lya Christy
- Fred Goebel
- Franz Verdier
- Michael von Newlinsky

== See also ==
- Manolescu's Memoirs (1920)
- Manolescu, Prince of Thieves (1933)

== Bibliography ==
- Goble, Alan. The Complete Index to Literary Sources in Film. Walter de Gruyter, 1999.
