= Sophie Pagay =

Austrian actress

- Born: Sophie Berg; 22 April 1860; Brno, Austrian Empire
- Died: 23 January 1937 (aged 76); Berlin, Germany
- Occupation: Actor

Sophie Berg Pagay (22 April 1860 – 23 January 1937) was an Austrian actress.

== Biography ==
She was worn in Brno. She began acting as a child, and went to Berlin to perform on stage in 1887. She married actor Hans Pagay.

== Selected filmography ==
- The Picture of Dorian Gray (1917)
- Carmen (1918)
- Intoxication (1919)
- A Drive into the Blue (1919)
- Mascotte (1920)
- Anna Boleyn (1920)
- The Forbidden Way (1920)
- Nobody Knows (1920)
- Lotte Lore (1921)
- Love at the Wheel (1921)
- The Eternal Struggle (1921)
- The House on the Moon (1921)
- The Blood (1922)
- Shame (1922)
- The Girl with the Mask (1922)
- His Excellency from Madagascar (1922)
- Tania, the Woman in Chains (1922)
- The Curse of Silence (1922)
- Louise de Lavallière (1922)
- Man by the Wayside (1923)
- By Order of Pompadour (1924)
- Darling of the King (1924)
- Cock of the Roost (1925)
- The Adventures of Sybil Brent (1925)
- People in Need (1925)
- The Girl with a Patron (1925)
- White Slave Traffic (1926)
- Cab No. 13 (1926)
- Professor Imhof (1926)
- The Good Reputation (1926)
- Her Husband's Wife (1926)
- The Sea Cadet (1926)
- The Woman in Gold (1926)
- A Sister of Six (1926)
- Sword and Shield (1926)
- Roses from the South (1926)
- The Last Waltz (1927)
- The Woman Who Couldn't Say No (1927)
- The Impostor (1927)
- The Tragedy of a Lost Soul (1927)
- On the Banks of the River Weser (1927)
- German Women - German Faithfulness (1927)
- The Long Intermission (1927)
- Weekend Magic (1927)
- The Girl Without a Homeland (1927)
- The False Prince (1927)
- The Transformation of Dr. Bessel (1927)
- Sir or Madam (1928)
- Mariett Dances Today (1928)
- When the Guard Marches (1928)
- The Harbour Baron (1928)
- Lemke's Widow (1928)
- Autumn on the Rhine (1928)
- Violantha (1928)
- The Saint and Her Fool (1928)
- The Duty to Remain Silent (1928)
- Painted Youth (1929)
- Bobby, the Petrol Boy (1929)
- It's You I Have Loved (1929)
- Fire in the Opera House (1930)
- Helene Willfüer, Student of Chemistry (1930)
- Mach' mir die Welt zum Paradies (1930)
- The Son of the White Mountain (1930)
- End of the Rainbow (1930)
- Scandal on Park Street (1932)
- Three Bluejackets and a Blonde (1933)
- The Sun Rises (1934)
- Make Me Happy (1935)

== Bibliography ==
- Hardt, Ursula (1996). From Caligari to California: Erich Pommer's Life in the International Film Wars. Providence: Berghahn Books. ISBN 978-1-57181-930-7.
- Prawer, Siegbert Salomon (2007) [2005]. Between Two Worlds: The Jewish Presence in German and Austrian Film, 1910–1933. New York: Berghahn Books. ISBN 978-1-84545-303-9.
