= Alfred Abel =

German actor (1879–1937)

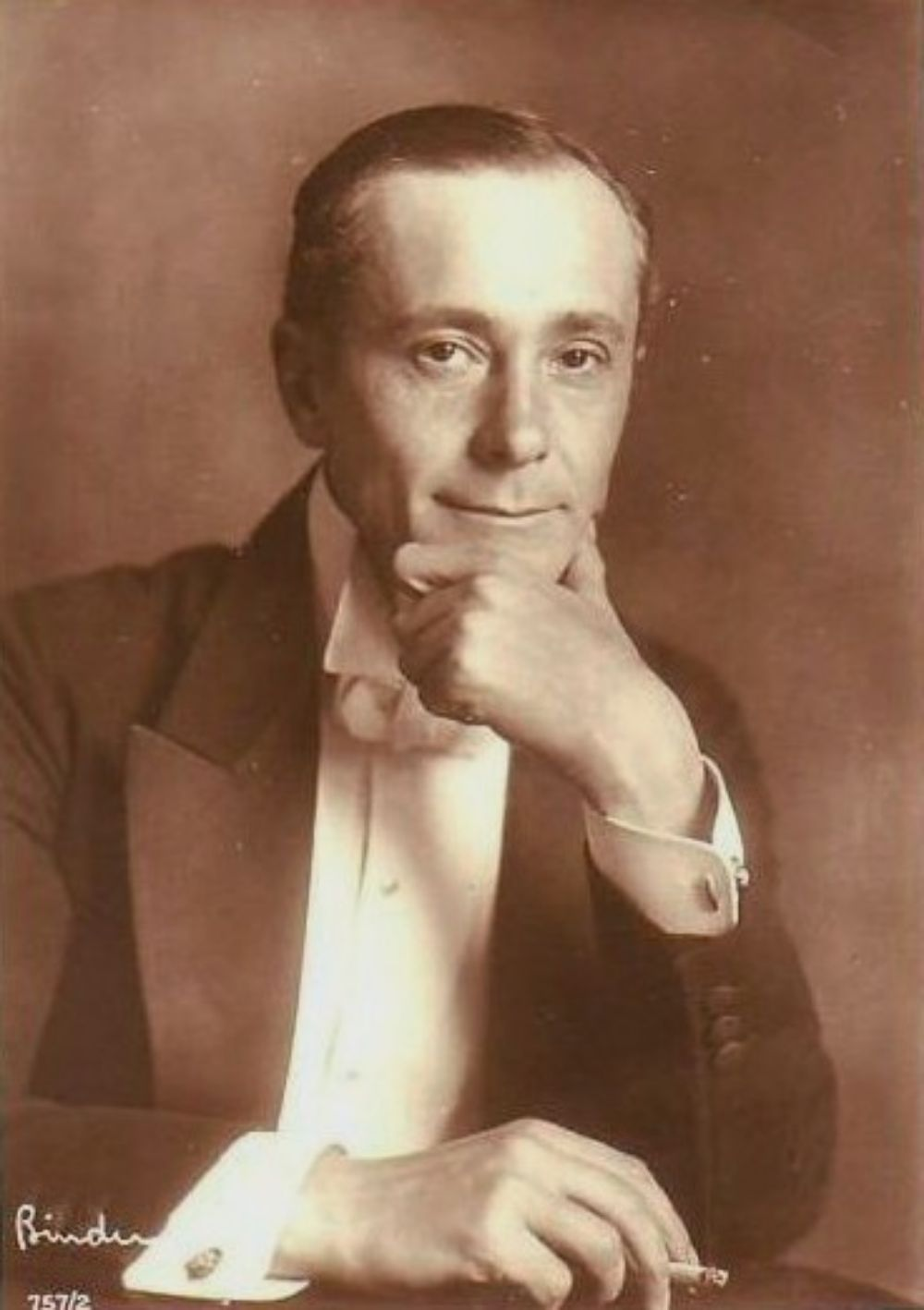
- Abel circa 1925
- Born: Alfred Peter Abel; 12 March 1879; Leipzig, Germany
- Died: 12 December 1937 (aged 58); Berlin, Germany
- Occupations: Actor, film director, film producer
- Years active: 1913–1937
- Spouse: Elizabeth Seidel
- Children: 1

Alfred Peter Abel (12 March 1879 – 12 December 1937) was a German film actor, director, and producer. He appeared in more than 140 silent and sound films between 1913 and 1938. His best-known performance was as Joh Fredersen in Fritz Lang's 1927 film, Metropolis.

== Early life ==
Born in Leipzig on 12 March 1879, Alfred Peter Abel was the son of Louis Abel, a peddler, and Anna Maria Selma. Abel attempted to embark on a number of different careers before becoming an actor. In his early adulthood, he apprenticed with a forester and later abandoned a gardening apprenticeship in Saxon Mittweida. He subsequently underwent commercial training in hopes of having a career in business. A short study of art drafting then followed at the Leipzig Academy. During this time, Abel attended private acting classes.

== Stage career ==
Abel received his first acting job in the city of Lucerne, Switzerland. He continued acting in numerous theaters in the Lucerne canton, until he finally moved on to perform at the Baranowsky Theater in Berlin under the direction of Max Reinhardt. He quickly gained fame and was called to do several other acting jobs. He acted alongside Fritzi Massary in Erich Engles' production of The First Mrs. Shelby at the Königgrätzer Straße Theater. He garnered international success with his guest performance at the Irving Place Theatre in New York City. By the recommendation of fellow actor Rudolf Christians, Abel appeared with the acting ensemble at Berlin's Deutschen Theater in 1904, where he remained for the next decade. By this point, he had performed in every theater in Berlin.

== Film career ==
During the first part of the twentieth century, Abel began working towards a film career. In 1913, he caught the eye of Asta Nielsen, who helped him break into the film industry. That same year, he made his screen debut playing the lead role of "Anselmus Aselmeyer" in Max Reinhardt's silent movie, Eine Venezianische Nacht, Abel acted in over one hundred silent films by renowned directors including Ernst Lubitsch, F. W. Murnau, and Richard Oswald, and alongside such famous silent film stars as Pola Negri, Henny Porten, Jenny Jugo, and Asta Nielsen. He often played dignified authority figures and was called the "Lewis Stone of German Pictures".

Abel's more notable silent film roles include his performances as "Lorenz Lubota" in Phantom (1922), as "Count Told" in Dr. Mabuse the Gambler (1922), as "Gaston" in Die Flamme (1923), and as "Alphonse Gunderman" in the French film L'Argent (1928). Abel's most famous silent film performance was in Fritz Lang’s futuristic film Metropolis (1927), as Joh Fredersen, leader of the metropolis. Abel was renowned for his acting style characterized by his avoidance of dramatic gesturing. He learned to show the psychology and internal tensions of his characters with reserved expressions. Many actors of his day struggled to change their acting styles for film after transitioning from stage acting and were often mocked later as sound film was introduced.

With the beginning of talkies, Abel remained a much desired actor and went on to star in 38 films. He worked with many renowned directors such as Detlef Sierck and Anatole Litvak. Some of his better-known sound films include Litvak's Dolly's Way to Stardom (1930) as Count Eberhard, Heinz Ruehmann's Meine Frau, die Hochstaplerin (1931), Reinhold Schuenzel's romance, Beautiful Adventure (1932) as Count d'Eguzon, and Franz Liszt's The Court Concert (1936) as Dichter Knips. Abel played the starring role of Sir John Menier in Alfred Hitchcock's Mary (1931), the German version of Hitchcock’s Murder! (1930). Abel's final film role was as Daffinger in Herbert Maisch's Frau Sylvelin (1938), which was not released until after his death.

There were rumours at the time of the 1922 film Nosferatu and for many years afterwards that Max Schreck, who played Count Orlok the vampire, did not actually exist and was a pseudonym for Abel.

== Directing career ==
At the beginning of the 1920s, Abel began considering a career as a director and created the production company Artifex Film. The company's only film was The Strike of the Thieves (1921), which Abel directed himself. The film was a box office failure. Abel did not direct again until 1929; Narcose is considered his most ambitious work. Following Narcose, Abel directed Bon Voyage (1933) and Everything for a Woman (1935). Abel assisted Carl Hoffman as the dialogue director in the film Viktoria in 1935.

== Personal life and death ==
Abel was married to Elizabeth Seidel, with whom he had one daughter, Ursula (1915–1951). Ursula, like her father, also became a film actor. However, the Nazi regime in 1935 prohibited her from appearing in any further films after she failed to produce ancestry papers (Ariernachweis) for her father to prove he was not of Jewish descent.

After battling a longtime illness, Abel died on 12 December 1937, aged 58. He was buried in the Friedhof Heerstraße cemetery in the Charlottenburg district of Berlin. His body was later exhumed and cremated in the German fashion, due to non-payment of cemetery fees.

== Selected filmography ==
- Eine Venezianische Nacht (1913)
- The Silent Mill (1914)
- Laugh Bajazzo (1915)
- The Vice (1915)
- The Confessions of the Green Mask (1916)
- Sinning Mother (1918)
- The Lady, the Devil and the Model (1918)
- Colomba (1918)
- Intoxication (1919)
- My Wife's Diary (1920)
- The Black Count (1920)
- The Woman Without a Soul (1920)
- The Secret of Bombay (1921)
- Sappho (1921)
- Nights of Terror (1921)
- Man Overboard (1921)
- Wandering Souls (1921)
- The Terror of the Red Mill (1921)
- The False Dimitri (1922)
- Phantom (1922)
- The Burning Soil (1922)
- The House of Molitor (1922)
- Bigamy (1922)
- Dr. Mabuse the Gambler (1922)
- The Vice of Gambling (1923)
- Poor Sinner (1923)
- The Flame (1923)
- The Grand Duke's Finances (1924)
- Dudu, a Human Destiny (1924)
- Playing with Destiny (1924)
- The Game of Love (1924)
- Man Against Man (1924)
- The Fire Dancer (1925)
- The Director General (1925)
- The Guardsman (1925)
- People to Each Other (1926)
- The Bank Crash of Unter den Linden (1926)
- Fadette (1926)
- Dancing Vienna (1927)
- Tragedy of a Marriage (1927)
- The Tragedy of a Lost Soul (1927)
- A Modern Dubarry (1927)
- The Vice of Humanity (1927)
- Metropolis (1927) - Johann (Joh) Fredersen
- Ariadne in Hoppegarten (1928)
- Who Invented Divorce? (1928)
- The Market of Life (1928)
- Princess Olala (1928)
- Strauss Is Playing Today (1928)
- L’Argent (1928)
- Marriage in Trouble (1929)
- My Heart is a Jazz Band (1929)
- Cagliostro (1929)
- Dolly Gets Ahead (1930)
- 1914 (1931)
- The Scoundrel (1931)
- Mary (1931)
- The Fate of Renate Langen (1931)
- My Wife, the Impostor (1931)
- The Office Manager (1931)
- The Trunks of Mr. O.F. (1931)
- Meine Frau, die Hochstaplerin (1931)
- The Beautiful Adventure (1932)
- Viennese Waltz (1932)
- Johnny Steals Europe (1932)
- The White Demon (1932)
- Viennese Waltz (1932)
- Spies at the Savoy Hotel (1932)
- The Burning Secret (1933)
- Bon Voyage (1933)
- The House of Dora Green (1933)
- Ways to a Good Marriage (1933)
- The Little Crook (1933)
- Manolescu, Prince of Thieves (1933)
- Love Conquers All (1934)
- Victoria (1935)
- Everything for a Woman (1935)
- The Court Concert (1936)
- A Strange Guest (1936)
- The Court Concert (1936)
- Game on Board (1936)
- Maria the Maid (1936)
- Seven Slaps (1937)
- Frau Sylvelin (1938)

== Directorial work ==
- The Strike of the Thieves (1921)
- Narcose (1929)
- Bon Voyage (1933)
- Everything for a Woman (1935)

== Notes ==
- Bock, Hans-Michael; Bergfelder, Tim, eds. (2009). The Concise Cinegraph: Encyclopaedia of German Cinema. New York: Berghahn Books. pp. 1–2. ISBN 978-1-57181-655-9.
