= Rudolf Forster =

Austrian actor (1884–1968)

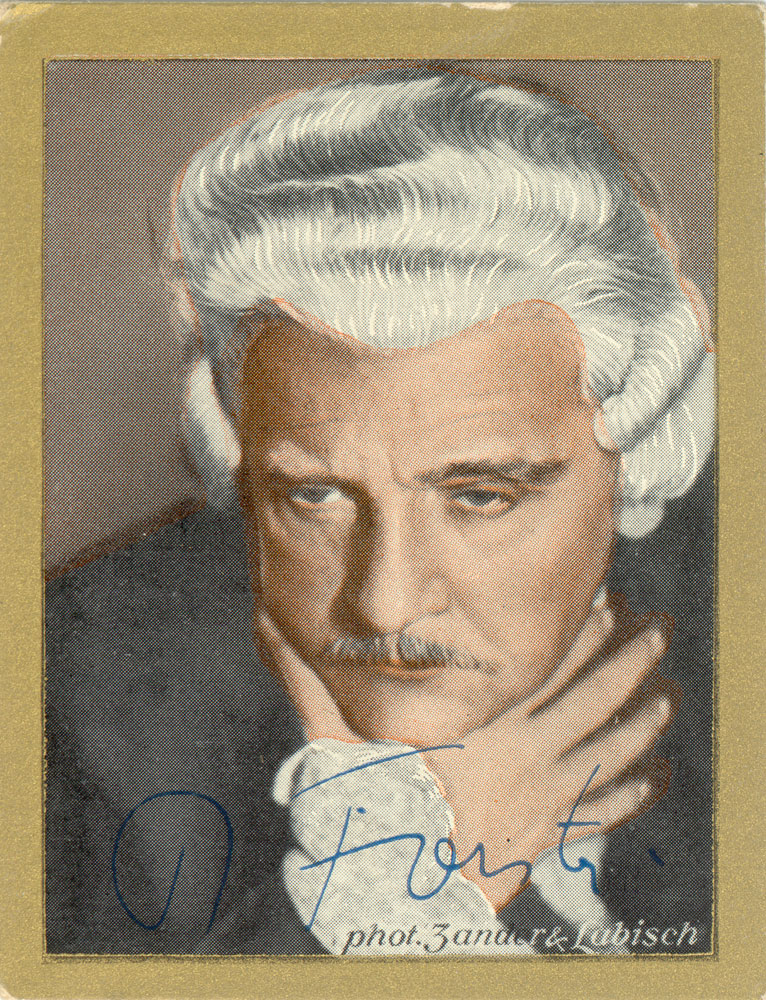
- Born: 30 October 1884; Gröbming, Austria-Hungary
- Died: 25 October 1968 (aged 83); Bad Aussee, Austria
- Occupation: Actor
- Years active: 1914–1968

Rudolf Forster (30 October 1884 – 25 October 1968) was an Austrian film actor. He appeared in more than 100 films between 1914 and 1968. His autobiography Das Spiel, mein Leben was published by Propyläen Verlag in 1967. He was born in Gröbming, Austria, and died in Bad Aussee, Austria.

== Selected filmography ==
- Lepain (1914, 1920, part 1–6) – Detektiv
- Das Bild der Ahnfrau (1916)
- Frauenruhm (1920)
- Glanz und Elend der Kurtisanen (1920) – Lucien de Rubempré / Léon Montaguard
- Der Schieberkönig (1920)
- Kurfürstendamm (1920) – Ernst Duffer
- Fanny Elssler (1920) – Gentz
- Manolescu's Memoirs (1920) – Alfons, deren Verlobter
- Princess Woronzoff (1920)
- Moj (1920)
- The Skull of Pharaoh's Daughter (1920) – Dr. Pflüger
- Der Schädel der Pharaonentochter (1920)
- Anna Karenina (1920) – Graf Ljevin
- Der Mann mit den drei Frauen (1920)
- 10 Millionen Volt (1921)
- Die rote Hexe (1921)
- The Red Masquerade Ball (1921)
- Das Geheimnis der Gladiatorenwerke (1921, part 1, 2) – Morlang
- The Amazon (1921)
- Love at the Wheel (1921)
- Das Geheimnis der Santa Maria (1921)
- The Hunt for the Truth (1921)
- The Eternal Curse (1921) – Lyn
- The Adventurer (1922) – Bergström
- Frau Sünde (1922)
- Die Schuhe einer schönen Frau (1922) – Casanova
- At the Edge of the Great City (1922)
- Between Day and Dream (1922) – Graf Cederström
- The Inheritance (1922)
- Earth Spirit (1923) – Alwa Schoen
- The Men of Sybill (1923)
- Fridericus Rex (1923, part 4) – Vorleser von Catt
- Lyda Ssanin (1923)
- Adam and Eve (1923)
- Resurrection (1923)
- Tragedy of Love (1923) – Francois Moreau
- The Countess of Paris (1923) – Graf François Moreau
- The Island of Tears (1923) – Harry – Offizier der amerik. Marine
- Fröken Fob (1923) – Horace Milltorp
- Die Sonne von St. Moritz (1923)
- Marionettes of the Princess (1924)
- Horrido (1924)
- Die Jagd nach der Frau (1924)
- Chronicles of the Gray House (1925) – Junker Detlef
- His Toughest Case (1926) – Francis Broon
- The Trousers (1927) – Scarron
- Assassination (1927) – Gregor von Askanius
- The Queen of Spades (1927) – Tomski – ein Spieler
- The Threepenny Opera (1931) – Mack the Knife
- Ariane (1931) – Konstantin Michael
- Yorck (1931) – King Friedrich Wilhelm III of Prussia
- The Countess of Monte Cristo (1932) – Rumowski, Hochstapler
- Dreaming Lips (1932) – Michael Marsden
- Morgenrot (1933) – Kapitanleutnant Helmut Liers
- Hohe Schule (1934) – Carlo Cavelli & Graf Werffen
- Santa Joanna D'Arc (1935)
- ... nur ein Komödiant (1935) – Herzog Friedrich Theodor / Florian Reiter
- Such Great Foolishness (1937) – Dr. Alexander Dahlen
- Island of Lost Men (1939) – Prof. Sen
- Vienna 1910 (1943) – Mayor Dr. Karl Lueger
- Der gebieterische Ruf (1944) – Hofrat Dr. Wichmann
- Ein Blick zurück (1944) – Dr. Eugen Friderici, Rechtsanwalt
- Journey to Happiness (1948) – Konsul Hoyermann
- The Man Who Wanted to Live Twice (1950) – Professor Hesse
- The Deadly Dreams (1951) – Opitz / E.T.A. Hoffmann / Gefreiter
- Immortal Light (1951) – Graf Kalinsky
- The White Horse Inn (1952) – Kaiser Franz Josef
- Victoria and Her Hussar (1954) – Fitzroy
- Captain Wronski (1954) – Oberst Maty
- Espionage (1955) – Chef des Generalstabes, von Heymeneck
- One Woman Is Not Enough? (1955) – Justizrat Dr. Kern
- The Last Man (1955) – Herr Claasen
- Regine (1956) – Geheimrat Hansen
- Winter in the Woods (1956) – Baron Malte
- Liane, Jungle Goddess (1956) – Theo Amelongen
- Kaiserjäger (1956) – Graf Leopold Hardberg, General a.D.
- The Unexcused Hour (1957) – Prof. Dr. Weiringk
- Spielbank-Affäre (1957) – Gallinger
- And Lead Us Not Into Temptation (1957) – von Hausen
- Scandal in Bad Ischl (1957) – Fürst Emanuel
- One Should Be Twenty Again (1958) – Dr. Clemens Herborth
- Eva (1959) – Hofrat von Leitner
- The Rest Is Silence (1959) – Sanitätsrat Dr. Max von Pohl
- Morgen wirst du um mich weinen (1958) – Konsul Hackrath
- Beloved Augustin (1960) – Dr. Mesmer
- A Glass of Water (1960) – Marquis de Torcy
- Brainwashed (1960) – Hotel Manager
- Until Hell Is Frozen (1961) – Admiral
- Das Riesenrad (1961) – Hofrat von Hill
- Via Mala (1961) – Maler Matthias
- The Return of Doctor Mabuse (1961) – Professor Julius Sabrehm
- Lulu (1962) - Schigolch
- He Can't Stop Doing It (1962) - Bischof
- Moral 63 (1963) – Der General a.D.
- The Hangman of London (1963) – Sir Francis Elliott – Ann's Father
- The Cardinal (1963) – Drunk Man at the Ball
- The Curse of the Hidden Vault (1964) – Real
- Tonio Kröger (1964) – Herr Seehaase
- The Blood of the Walsungs (1965) – Count Arnstatt
- Pleins feux sur Stanislas (1965) – Rameau
- Once a Greek (1966)
- Tower of Screaming Virgins (1968) – Honoré de Latoure
- Von Haut zu Haut (1971) – Trodler
