= Wilhelm Hegeler =

German novelist (1870–1943)

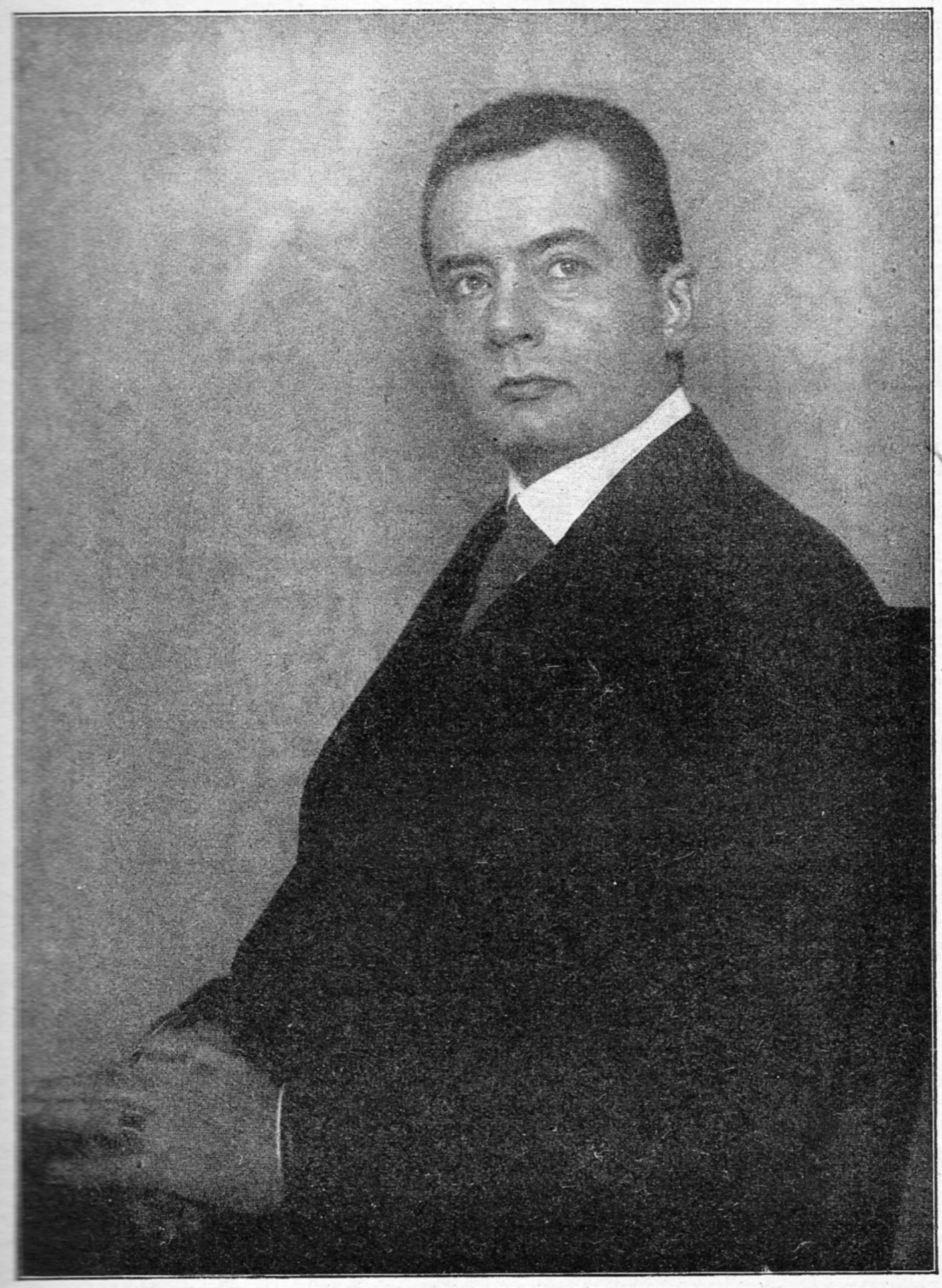
Wilhelm Hegeler; photograph by Rudolf Dührkoop

Wilhelm Hegeler (25 February 1870 in Varel, Grand Duchy of Oldenburg – 8 October 1943 in Irschenhausen) was a German novelist.

== Biography ==
He studied law at the Ludwig-Maximilians-Universität München, the University of Geneva, and the Friedrich Wilhelm University of Berlin, traveled extensively, and returned to Munich in 1895 to settle down to literary work. He moved to Berlin in 1897 and to Weimar in 1906.

== Writings ==
He engaged in the production, at first, of naturalistic novels dealing with the life of the population along the river Rhine, later, of humorous satires. Their popularity in Germany was very great, and Hegeler's books frequently appeared among the lists of bestsellers for certain years (1905, for instance).

His works include:

- Sonnige Tage (Berlin, 1898)
- Ingenieur Horstmann (Berlin, 1900)
- Das Ärgernis (Berlin, 1907)

== Evaluation ==
His stories were at first characterized by a rather sharp and painful naturalism, but later assumed a convincing and powerful realism.
