= Fight of the Tertia (1952 film) =

1952 film

- German film poster
- German: Der Kampf der Tertia
- Directed by: Erik Ode
- Written by: Werner Kortwich; Elly Rauch
- Based on: Fight of the Tertia by Wilhelm Speyer
- Starring: Brigitte Rau; Wolfgang Jansen; Horst Köppen; Franz-Otto Krüger
- Cinematography: Arndt Rautenfeld
- Edited by: Klaus Dudenhöfer
- Music by: Herbert Windt
- Production company: Cinephon-Film
- Distributed by: Union-Film
- Release date: 21 November 1952
- Running time: 91 minutes
- Country: West Germany
- Language: German

Fight of the Tertia (German: Der Kampf der Tertia) is a 1952 West German family film directed by Erik Ode and starring Brigitte Rau, Wolfgang Jansen and Horst Köppen. It was shot at the Wandsbek Studios in Hamburg and on location around the city. The film's sets were designed by the art director Hans Luigi. It is based on the 1928 novel of the same name by Wilhelm Speyer which was previously adapted into a 1929 silent film.

== Plot ==
Youth gangs clash in a small town on the Baltic Sea.

== Cast ==
- Brigitte Rau as Daniela
- Wolfgang Jansen as Borst
- Horst Köppen as Knötzinger Jr.
- Franz-Otto Krüger as Knötzinger
- Gert Andreae as Alexander Kirchholtes
- Hans Stiebner as Biersack
- Adalbert Kriwat as Falk
- Alexander Hunzinger as Polizeiwachtmeister Holzapfel
- Helmuth Rudolph as principal
- Rolf Weih as Dr. Frey
- Günther Jerschke as Dr. Grau
- Kurt Waitzmann as school nurse
- Frank Riedmüller as Tertian
- Dieter von Barany as Tertian
- Charles Brauer as Tertian
- Horst Höfer as Tertian
- Thomas Langenheim as Tertian
- Jürgen Cziesla as Tertian
- Wolfgang Thomas as Tertian
- Hubert von Albedyll as Tertian
- Peter Winter as Tertian
- Wolfgang Ehrlich as Tertian

== Bibliography ==
- Bock, Hans-Michael; Bergfelder, Tim, eds. (2009). The Concise Cinegraph: Encyclopaedia of German Cinema. New York: Berghahn Books. p. 302. ISBN 978-1-57181-655-9.
