= Frida Richard =

Austrian actress

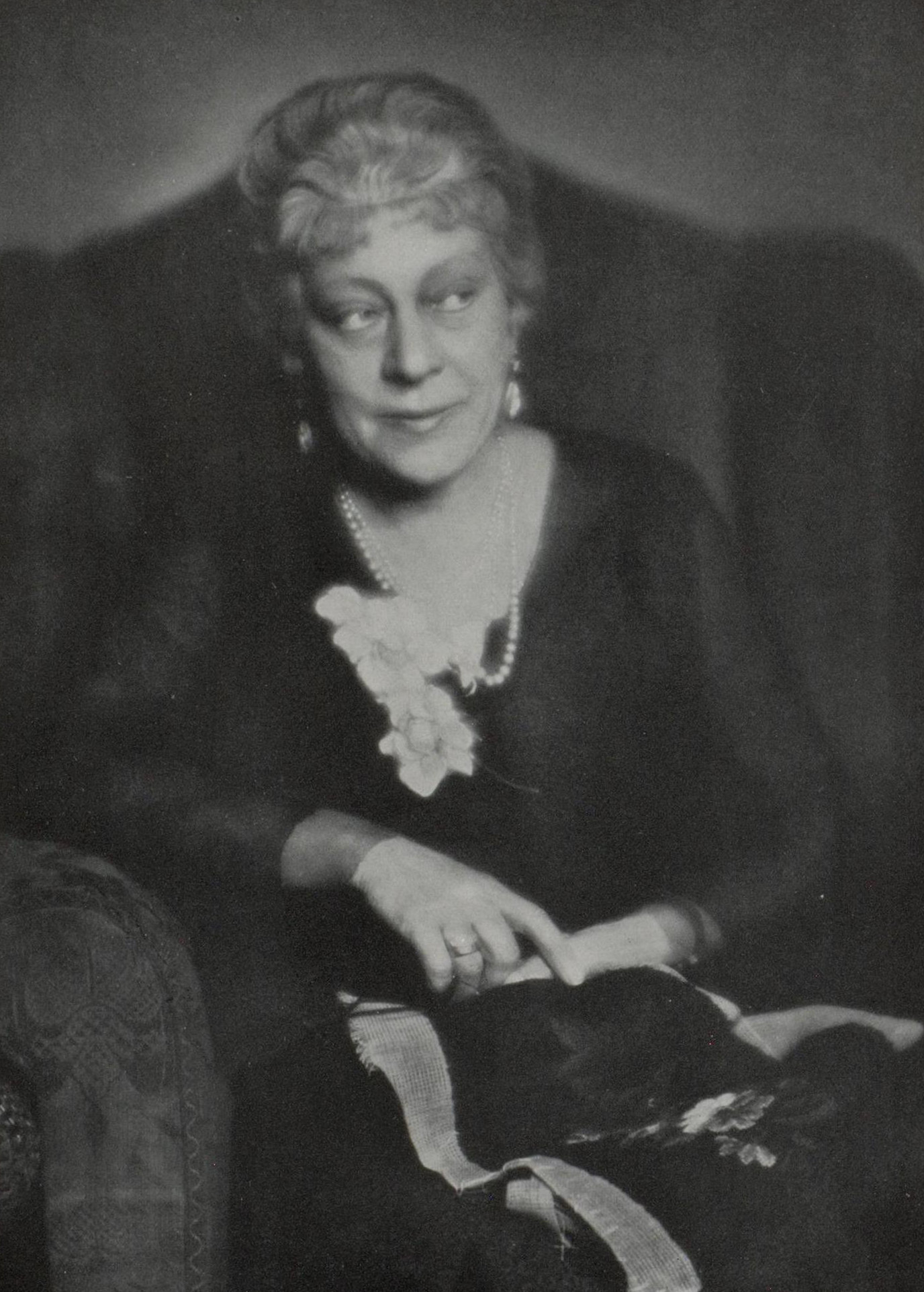
- Richard c. 1930
- Born: Friederike Raithel; 1 November 1873; Vienna, Austria-Hungary
- Died: 12 September 1946 (aged 72); Salzburg, Austria
- Occupation: Actress
- Years active: 1908–1944
- Spouse: Fritz Richard
- Children: 3

Frida Richard (born Friederike Raithel, 1 November 1873 – 12 September 1946) was an Austrian actress. She was a prolific actress in both the silent and sound eras.

== Selected filmography ==
- The Sin of Helga Arndt (1916)
- The Queen's Love Letter (1916)
- The Marriage of Luise Rohrbach (1917)
- The Diamond Foundation (1917)
- The Ringwall Family (1918)
- Waves of Fate (1918)
- The Ghost Hunt (1918)
- The Pied Piper of Hamelin (1918)
- Intoxication (1919)
- Baccarat (1919)
- The Dancer (1919)
- Superstition (1919)
- The Teahouse of the Ten Lotus Flowers (1919)
- Temperamental Artist (1920)
- Uriel Acosta (1920)
- The Black Count (1920)
- Christian Wahnschaffe (1920)
- Judith Trachtenberg (1920)
- The Graveyard of the Living (1921)
- The Last Witness (1921)
- The Hunt for the Truth (1921)
- The New Paradise (1921)
- The Stranger from Alster Street (1921)
- About the Son (1921)
- Alfred von Ingelheim's Dramatic Life (1921)
- Wandering Souls (1921)
- The Shadow of Gaby Leed (1921)
- The Inheritance of Tordis (1921)
- The House on the Moon (1921)
- The Raft of the Dead (1921)
- A Dying Nation (1922)
- The Call of Destiny (1922)
- Prashna's Secret (1922)
- The Big Shot (1922)
- Phantom (1922)
- Barmaid (1922)
- The Lost House (1922)
- Lola Montez, the King's Dancer (1922)
- The Treasure of Gesine Jacobsen (1923)
- The Lost Shoe (1923)
- Lyda Ssanin (1923)
- The Chain Clinks (1923)
- Daisy (1923)
- And Yet Luck Came (1923)
- The Men of Sybill (1923)
- Count Cohn (1923)
- The Flame (1923)
- Irene of Gold (1923)
- The Merchant of Venice (1923)
- New Year's Eve (Sylvester: Tragödie einer Nacht) (1924)
- Siegfried (1924)
- Spring Awakening (1924)
- Leap Into Life (1924)
- By Order of Pompadour (1924)
- The Stolen Professor (1924)
- Heart of Stone (1924)
- Claire (1924)
- Playing with Destiny (1924)
- Mountain of Destiny (1924)
- The Hanseatics (1925)
- The Old Ballroom (1925)
- The Island of Dreams (1925)
- Old Mamsell's Secret (1925)
- The Elegant Bunch (1925)
- Den of Iniquity (1925)
- Oh Those Glorious Old Student Days (1925)
- An Artist of Life (1925)
- The Dice Game of Life (1925)
- Shadows of the Metropolis (1925)
- The Flower Girl of Potsdam Square (1925)
- Slums of Berlin (1925)
- Lightning (1925)
- The Telephone Operator (1925)
- The Woman Who Did (1925)
- The Farmer from Texas (1925)
- Peter the Pirate (1925)
- Hedda Gabler (1925)
- Elegantes Pack (1925)
- Cock of the Roost (1925)
- Give My Regards to the Blonde Child on the Rhine (1926)
- The Blue Danube (1926)
- False Shame (1926)
- Maytime (1926)
- Women of Passion (1926)
- Fedora (1926)
- Vienna, How it Cries and Laughs (1926)
- The Circus of Life (1926)
- Watch on the Rhine (1926)
- Should We Be Silent? (1926)
- The Brothers Schellenberg (1926)
- The Young Man from the Ragtrade (1926)
- Faust (1926)
- The Holy Mountain (1926)
- The Convicted (1927)
- Intoxicated Love (1927)
- The Most Beautiful Legs of Berlin (1927)
- Light-Hearted Isabel (1927)
- On the Banks of the River Weser (1927)
- Chance the Idol (1927)
- The Curse of Vererbung (1927)
- Weekend Magic (1927)
- Tragedy of a Marriage (1927)
- The Eighteen Year Old (1927)
- The Girl from Abroad (1927)
- Carnival Magic (1927)
- Grand Hotel (1927)
- That Was Heidelberg on Summer Nights (1927)
- The Queen Was in the Parlour (1927)
- The Prince of Rogues (1928)
- Lemke's Widow (1928)
- Katharina Knie (1929)
- The Convict from Istanbul (1929)
- The Burning Heart (1929)
- The Woman One Longs For (1929)
- People in the Fire (1930)
- Love in the Ring (1930)
- By a Nose (1931)
- The Man Who Murdered (1931)
- The Victor (1932)
- Voices of Spring (1933)
- Unfinished Symphony (1934)
- When You're Young, the World Belongs to You (1934)
- Suburban Cabaret (1935)
- His Daughter is Called Peter (1936)
- The Priest from Kirchfeld (1937)
- Mirror of Life (1938)
- A Mother's Love (1939)
- A Hopeless Case (1939)
- Goodbye, Franziska (1941)
- Rembrandt (1942)
- Die goldene Stadt (1942)
- Opfergang (1944)

== Bibliography ==
- Kester, Bernadette. Film Front Weimar: Representations of the First World War in German films of the Weimar Period (1919-1933). Amsterdam University Press, 2003.
