= Manolescu's Memoirs =

1920 film

- Directed by: Richard Oswald
- Written by: Georges Manolescu (memoirs); Richard Oswald
- Starring: Conrad Veidt; Erna Morena; Lilli Lohrer
- Cinematography: Max Lutze
- Production company: Richard-Oswald-Produktion
- Release date: 1 October 1920
- Country: Germany
- Languages: Silent; German intertitles

Manolescu's Memoirs (German: Manolescus Memoiren) is a 1920 German silent film directed by Richard Oswald and starring Conrad Veidt, Erna Morena and Lilli Lohrer.

The film's sets were designed by the art director Hans Dreier.

== Cast ==
- Conrad Veidt as Manolescu
- Erna Morena as Diane von Montignan
- Lilli Lohrer as Leonie, Portierstochter
- Hedda Vernon as Cäcilie
- Hermann Wlach as Rudolf Berg, Oberkellner
- Alfred Kuehne as der alte Manolescu
- Clementine Plessner as Mutter Manolescu
- Kathe Oswald as Inge
- Rudolf Forster as Alfons, deren Verlobter
- Adele Sandrock as Gräfin Anastasia Worutzky
- Robert Scholtz as Geheimpolizist Schröder
- Preben J. Rist as Herr im Pyjama

== See also ==
- Manolescu (1929)
- Manolescu, Prince of Thieves (1933)

== Bibliography ==
- Eric Rentschler. German Film & Literature. Routledge, 2013.
