= Harry Hill, Lord of the World =

1923 film

- Directed by: Lorenz Bätz
- Starring: Valy Arnheim
- Production company: Valy Arnheim-Film
- Release date: 1923
- Country: Germany
- Languages: Silent; German intertitles

Harry Hill, Lord of the World (German:Harry Hill, der Herr der Welt) is a 1923 German silent film directed by Lorenz Bätz and starring Valy Arnheim. It was part of a series of films featuring Arnheim as the detective Harry Hill.

== Cast ==
In alphabetical order

- Valy Arnheim
- Rudolf Klein-Rhoden
- Kurt Lilien
- Marga Lindt
- Aruth Wartan

== Bibliography ==
- Gene Scott Freese. Hollywood Stunt Performers, 1910s-1970s: A Biographical Dictionary. McFarland, 2014.
