= Fight of the Tertia (1929 film) =

1929 film directed by Max Mack

- German film poster
- German: Der Kampf der Tertia
- Directed by: Max Mack
- Written by: Axel Eggebrecht; Max Mack
- Based on: Fight of the Tertia by Wilhelm Speyer
- Starring: Max Schreck; Fritz Richard; Fritz Greiner; Karl Hoffmann
- Cinematography: Emil Schünemann
- Music by: Giuseppe Becce
- Production company: Terra Film
- Distributed by: Filmhaus Bruckmann
- Release date: 18 January 1929
- Running time: 92 minutes
- Country: Germany
- Languages: Silent; German intertitles

Fight of the Tertia (German: Der Kampf der Tertia) is a 1929 German silent family film directed by Max Mack and starring Max Schreck, Fritz Richard and Fritz Greiner. It is based on the 1928 novel of the same name by Wilhelm Speyer which was later adapted into a 1952 sound film. It was shot at the Terra Studios in Berlin and on location in Friedrichstadt and in the North Sea. The film's art direction was by Hans Jacoby.

== Synopsis ==
Youth gangs clash in a small town on the Baltic Sea.

== Cast ==
- Max Schreck as Benno Biersack
- Fritz Richard as Magistrate Falk
- Fritz Greiner as Schutzmann Holzapfel
- Karl Hoffmann as the great elector
- Gustl Gstettenbaur as Borst
- Rudolf Klein-Rhoden as Bürgermeister von Boestrum
- Fritz Draeger as Reppert
- August Wilhelm Keese as Otto Kirchholtes
- Ilse Stobrawa as Daniela
- Aribert Mog as teacher #1
- Hermann Neut Paulsen as teacher #2
- Erich Schönfelder

== Bibliography ==
- Bock, Hans-Michael; Bergfelder, Tim, eds. (2009). The Concise Cinegraph: Encyclopaedia of German Cinema. New York: Berghahn Books. ISBN 978-1-57181-655-9.
