= List of German films of 1928 =

This is a list of the most notable films produced in the Cinema of Germany in 1928.

| Title | Director | Cast | Genre | Notes |
|---|---|---|---|---|
1928
| The Abduction of the Sabine Women | Robert Land | Ralph Arthur Roberts, Ida Wüst | Comedy | |
| Accident | Ernö Metzner | Heinrich Gotho, Sybille Schmitz | Drama | |
| Adam and Eve | Rudolf Biebrach | Reinhold Schünzel, Elza Temary | Comedy | |
| Almenrausch and Edelweiss | Franz Seitz | Leo Peukert, Gritta Ley, Walter Slezak | Drama | |
| Alraune | Henrik Galeen | Brigitte Helm, Paul Wegener | Drama | Based on the story by Hanns Heinz Ewers |
| Anastasia, the False Czar's Daughter | Arthur Bergen | Lee Parry, Hans Stüwe | Drama | |
| Angst | Hans Steinhoff | Gustav Fröhlich, Henry Edwards | Drama | Co-production with Britain |
| Ariadne in Hoppegarten | Robert Dinesen | Alfred Abel, Maria Jacobini | Sports | |
| Artists | Géza von Bolváry | Gyula Szőreghy, Anton Edthofer | Silent | |
| At Ruedesheimer Castle There Is a Lime Tree | Johannes Guter | Werner Fuetterer, Marija Leiko | Silent | |
| Autumn on the Rhine | Siegfried Philippi | Albert Steinrück, Julius Brandt | Silent | |
| Band of Thieves | Hans Behrendt | Paul Hörbiger, Leonhard Frank | Silent | |
| The Beaver Coat | Erich Schönfelder | Ralph Arthur Roberts, Lucie Höflich | Comedy | |
| Because I Love You | Johannes Guter | Suzy Vernon, Willy Fritsch | Romance | |
| Behind Monastery Walls | Franz Seitz | Georg Jacoby, Georg Henrich | Drama | |
| The Beloved of His Highness | Jacob Fleck, Luise Fleck | Vivian Gibson, Mary Kid, Paul Richter | Comedy | |
| A Better Master | Gustav Ucicky | Leo Peukert, Lydia Potechina | Comedy | |
| The Blue Mouse | Johannes Guter | Jenny Jugo, Harry Halm | Silent | |
| The Carnival Prince | Rudolf Walther-Fein | Marianne Winkelstern, Harry Liedtke | Silent | |
| The Carousel of Death | Heinz Paul | Claire Rommer, Anton Pointner | Silent | |
| Casanova's Legacy | Manfred Noa | Andrée Lafayette, Maly Delschaft | Silent | |
| The Case of Prosecutor M | Rudolf Meinert, Giulio Antamoro | Maria Jacobini, Jean Angelo | Mystery | |
| Charlotte Somewhat Crazy | Adolf E. Licho | Lya De Putti, Livio Pavanelli | Comedy | |
| Children's Tragedy | Phil Jutzi, Karl Lutz | Hermann Picha, Jaro Fürth | Drama | |
| The Countess of Sand | Hans Steinhoff | Käthe von Nagy, Jack Trevor | Silent | |
| The Crazy Countess | Richard Löwenbein | Ralph Arthur Roberts, Werner Fuetterer | Silent | |
| The Criminal of the Century | Max Obal | Luciano Albertini, Hans Albers, Vivian Gibson | Crime | |
| Cry for Help | Franz Hofer | Hans Mierendorff, John Mylong | Drama | |
| Dame Care | Robert Land | Fritz Kortner, Mary Carr | Silent | |
| Darling of the Dragoons | Rudolf Walther-Fein | Maria Paudler, Harry Liedtke | Comedy | |
| Das deutsche Lied | Karl Pindl | Gritta Ley, Theodor Becker, Wilhelm Diegelmann | Drama | |
| The Devious Path | Georg Wilhelm Pabst | Gustav Diessl, Brigitte Helm | Drama | |
| Docks of Hamburg | Erich Waschneck | Jenny Jugo, Willy Fritsch | Drama | |
| Doctor Schäfer | Wolfgang Neff | Evelyn Holt, Iván Petrovich | Drama | |
| Don Juan in a Girls' School | Reinhold Schünzel | Reinhold Schünzel, Lydia Potechina | Comedy | |
| The Duty to Remain Silent | Carl Wilhelm | Marcella Albani, Vivian Gibson | Drama | |
| Dyckerpotts' Heirs | Hans Behrendt | Paul Hörbiger, Georg Alexander | Comedy | |
| Eddy Polo in the Wasp's Nest | Léo Lasko | Eddie Polo, Grit Haid | Adventure | |
| Escape | Carl Froelich | Henny Porten, Max Maximilian | Drama | |
| Escape from Hell | Georg Asagaroff | Jean Murat, Louis Ralph | Drama | |
| Eva in Silk | Carl Boese | Lissy Arna, Walter Rilla | Silent | |
| Eve's Daughters | Carl Lamac | Anny Ondra, Wolfgang Zilzer | Drama | Co-production with Czechoslovakia |
| Fair Game | Holger-Madsen | Evelyn Holt, Fred Louis Lerch | Drama | |
| The Fate of the House of Hapsburg | Rolf Raffé | Fritz Spira, Leni Riefenstahl | Drama | |
| The First Kiss | Carl Lamac | Anny Ondra, Eugen Burg | Comedy | |
| Five Anxious Days | Gennaro Righelli | Maria Jacobini, Anton Pointner | Drama | |
| Flucht vor Blond | Louis Ralph | Georg Alexander, Lia Eibenschütz, Ágnes Eszterházy | Silent | |
| Folly of Love | Robert Wiene | Maria Jacobini, Jack Trevor | Comedy | |
| The Foreign Legionnaire | James Bauer | Dorothea Wieck, Ferdinand Martini | Adventure | |
| The Gallant Hussar | Géza von Bolváry | Ivor Novello, Evelyn Holt | Romance | Co-production with Britain |
| The Gambling Den of Montmartre | Willy Reiber, Franz Seitz Sr. | Eric Barclay, Suzy Vernon | Silent | |
| The Game of Love | Victor Janson | Harry Liedtke, Kurt Vespermann | Silent | |
| Der gefesselte Polo | Léo Lasko | Eddie Polo, Harry Hardt, Grit Haid | Action | |
| The Girl from the Revue | Richard Eichberg | Dina Gralla, Werner Fuetterer | Silent | |
| A Girl with Temperament | Victor Janson | Eugen Neufeld, Maria Paudler | Silent | |
| Girls, Beware! | Valy Arnheim | Egon von Jordan, Hanni Weisse | Drama | |
| Give Me Life | Klaus Fery | Grete Reinwald, Henry Stuart | Drama | |
| The Great Adventuress | Robert Wiene | Lili Damita, Georg Alexander | Comedy | |
| The Green Alley | Richard Oswald | Grete Mosheim, Gustav Fröhlich | silent | |
| Guilty | Johannes Meyer | Suzy Vernon, Willy Fritsch | Drama | |
| Gaunerliebchen | Max Reichmann | Charlotte Ander, Raimondo Van Riel, Hans Mierendorff | Silent | |
| Hands Up, Eddy Polo | Léo Lasko | Eddie Polo, Ernst Reicher, Otz Tollen | Action | |
| The Hangman | Theodor Sparkuhl, Adolf Trotz | Andrée Lafayette, Bernhard Goetzke | Silent | |
| The Happy Vagabonds | Jacob Fleck, Luise Fleck | Georg Alexander, Lotte Lorring | Silent | |
| The Harbour Baron | Ernst Winar | Colette Brettel, Hans Brausewetter | Silent | |
| Das Hannerl von Rolandsbogen | Wolfgang Neff | Gritta Ley, Wilhelm Diegelmann | Silent | |
| He Goes Right, She Goes Left! | Fred Sauer | Livio Pavanelli, Lotte Neumann, Georg Alexander | Romance | |
| Herkules Maier | Alexander Esway | Reinhold Schünzel, Claire Rommer | Comedy | |
| Der Herzensphotograph | Max Reichmann | Harry Liedtke, Robert Garrison, La Jana | Silent | |
| His Strongest Weapon | Harry Piel | Harry Piel, Vera Schmiterlöw, Philipp Manning | Thriller | |
| Die Hölle der Jungfrauen | Robert Dinesen | Werner Krauss, Elizza La Porta | Drama | |
| Homecoming | Joe May | Lars Hanson, Dita Parlo | War/Drama | |
| Honeymoon | E.W. Emo | Margot Landa, Harald Paulsen | Silent | |
| Honour Thy Mother | Paul L. Stein | Mary Carr, Walter Rilla | Silent | |
| The House Without Men | Rolf Randolf | Ossi Oswalda, Iwa Wanja | Comedy | |
| Hungarian Rhapsody | Hanns Schwarz | Lil Dagover, Willy Fritsch | Drama | |
| Hurrah! I Live! | Wilhelm Thiele | Max Gülstorff, Nathalie Lissenko | Comedy | |
| I Once Had a Beautiful Homeland | Max Mack | Leo Peukert, Grete Reinwald | Silent | |
| Immorality | Willi Wolff | Ellen Richter, Nicolas Rimsky | Drama | |
| The Insurmountable | Max Obal | Luciano Albertini, Vivian Gibson | Silent | |
| In Werder the Trees are in Bloom | Fred Sauer | Teddy Bill, Fritz Schulz | Silent | |
| It Attracted Three Fellows | Carl Wilhelm | Hans Albers, Eugen Burg | Comedy | |
| Jahrmarkt des Lebens | Béla Balogh | Gustav Fröhlich, Vera Schmiterlöw | Silent | |
| The Joker | Georg Jacoby | Henry Edwards, Elga Brink | Drama | |
| Kaczmarek | Carl Wilhelm | Evi Eva, Fritz Schulz, Hanni Weisse | Silent | |
| The King of Carnival | Georg Jacoby | Gabriel Gabrio, Renée Héribel | Silent | |
| Knights of the Night | Max Reichmann | Ivan Koval-Samborsky, La Jana | Silent | |
| The Lady and the Chauffeur | Manfred Noa | Jack Trevor, Elisabeth Pinajeff | Comedy | |
| The Lady from Argentina | Siegfried Philippi | Hans Albers, Gritta Ley | Silent | |
| The Lady in Black | Franz Osten | Liane Haid, Marcella Albani | Silent | |
| The Lady with the Mask | Wilhelm Thiele | Max Gülstorff, Arlette Marchal | Silent | |
| The Last Fort | Curtis Bernhardt | Rolla Norman, Maria Paudler | War | |
| The Last Night | A.W. Sandberg | Diomira Jacobini, Gösta Ekman | Silent | |
| The Last Performance of the Circus Wolfson | Domenico Gambino | Lydia Potechina, Hermann Vallentin | Silent | |
| Lemke's Widow | Carl Boese | Lissy Arna, Sophie Pagay | Silent | |
| Leontine's Husbands | Robert Wiene | Claire Rommer, Georg Alexander | Comedy | |
| Life's Circus | Max Reichmann | Raimondo Van Riel, Kurt Gerron | Drama | |
| The Little Slave | Jacob Fleck, Luise Fleck | Grete Mosheim, Fritz Richard | Comedy | |
| Looping the Loop | Arthur Robison | Werner Krauss, Jenny Jugo | Thriller | |
| Lotte | Carl Froelich | Sig Arno, Kurt Gerron | Silent | |
| A Love, A Thief, A Department Store | Karl Theodor Wagner | Colette Brettel, Rudolf Klein-Rhoden | Romance | |
| Love and Thieves | Carl Froelich | Henny Porten, Anton Pointner | Drama | |
| The Love Commandment | Victor Janson | Dina Gralla, Lilian Harvey | Silent | |
| Love in the Cowshed | Carl Froelich | Henny Porten, Eugen Neufeld | Drama | |
| Love on Skis | Rolf Randolf | Harry Liedtke, Georg Henrich | Comedy | |
| Love's Masquerade | Augusto Genina | Carmen Boni, Hans Junkermann | Silent | |
| Luther | Hans Kyser | Eugen Klöpfer, Rudolf Lettinger | Historical | |
| Mädchenschicksale | Richard Löwenbein | Vera Schmiterlöw, Eugen Burg, Gina Manès | Drama | |
| Majestät schneidet Bubiköpfe | Ragnar Hyltén-Cavallius | Hans Junkermann, Brita Appelgren | Drama | Co-production with Sweden |
| Man Against Man | Harry Piel | Harry Piel, Dary Holm | Thriller | |
| The Man with the Limp | Willy Reiber, Franz Seitz Sr. | Christa Tordy, Alfred Abel | Silent | |
| Mariett Dances Today | Frederic Zelnik | Lya Mara, Fred Louis Lerch | Silent | |
| The Market of Life | Béla Balogh | Gustav Fröhlich, Hans Mierendorff, Vera Schmiterlöw | Silent | |
| Marriage | Rudolf Walther-Fein | Hans Junkermann, Fritz Kampers | Silent | Co-production with Austria |
| Mary Lou | Frederic Zelnik | Lya Mara, Fred Louis Lerch | Silent | |
| Mary's Big Secret | Guido Brignone | André Mattoni, Ralph Arthur Roberts | Silent | |
| Master and Mistress | Alfred Theodor Mann | Hans Albers, Maly Delschaft, Carl de Vogt | Silent | |
| Mikosch Comes In | Rolf Randolf | Gyula Szőreghy, Lydia Potechina | Comedy | |
| Milak, the Greenland Hunter | Georg Asagaroff | Ruth Weyher, Lotte Lorring | Adventure | |
| Miss Chauffeur | Jaap Speyer | Mady Christians, Johannes Riemann | Comedy | |
| A Modern Casanova | Max Obal, Rudolf Walther-Fein | Harry Liedtke, María Corda | Comedy | |
| Modern Pirates | Manfred Noa | Jack Trevor, Marietta Millner | Comedy | |
| Moral | Willi Wolff | Ellen Richter, Ralph Arthur Roberts | Silent | |
| The Most Beautiful Woman in Paris | Jacob Fleck, Luise Fleck | Elga Brink, Warwick Ward | Silent | |
| My Friend Harry | Rudolf Walther-Fein, Max Obal | Harry Liedtke, Maria Paudler | Silent | |
| The Mysterious Mirror | Carl Hoffmann | Fee Malten, Fritz Rasp | Fantasy | |
| Number 17 | Géza von Bolváry | Guy Newall, Lien Deyers | Crime | Co-production with Britain |
| Odette | Luitz-Morat | Francesca Bertini, Warwick Ward | Drama | |
| The Old Fritz | Gerhard Lamprecht | Otto Gebühr, Julia Serda | Historical | Released in Two Parts |
| One Night in Yoshiwara | Emmerich Hanus | Alfred Abel, Rudolf Klein-Rogge | Silent | |
| Only a Viennese Woman Kisses Like That | Arthur Bergen | Werner Fuetterer, Erna Morena | Silent | |
| Orient | Gennaro Righelli | Dolly Davis, Vladimir Gajdarov | Silent | |
| Panic | Harry Piel | Harry Piel, Dary Holm | Crime | |
| The Page Boy at the Golden Lion | Carl Boese | Fritz Kampers, Gustl Gstettenbaur | Comedy | |
| Parisiennes | Gustaf Molander | Margit Manstad, Ruth Weyher | Silent | Co-production with Sweden |
| Pawns of Passion | Wiktor Biegański, Carmine Gallone | Olga Chekhova, Harry Frank | Drama | |
| Polish Economy | E.W. Emo | Iwa Wanja, Margot Landa | Drama | |
| The President | Gennaro Righelli | Ivan Mozzhukhin, Suzy Vernon | Drama | |
| The Prince of Rogues | Curtis Bernhardt | Hans Stüwe, Lissy Arna | Historical | |
| Prince or Clown | Aleksandr Razumny | Marcella Albani, Barbara von Annenkoff | Silent | |
| Princess Olala | Robert Land | Carmen Boni, Walter Rilla | Drama | |
| Rasputin | Nikolai Larin, Boris Nevolin | Vladimir Gajdarov, Ernst Rückert | Drama | Co-production with the Soviet Union |
| Rasputin, the Holy Sinner | Martin Berger | Nikolai Malikoff, Diana Karenne | Silent | |
| The Republic of Flappers | Constantin J. David | Käthe von Nagy, Raimondo Van Riel | Comedy | |
| Restless Hearts | Benito Perojo, Gustav Ucicky | Betty Bird, Imperio Argentina | Silent | Co-production with Spain |
| Robert and Bertram | Rudolf Walther-Fein | Harry Liedtke, Fritz Kampers | Comedy | |
| The Runaway Girl | Hanns Schwarz | Käthe von Nagy, Vivian Gibson | Silent | |
| The Saint and Her Fool | William Dieterle | Lien Deyers, Gina Manès | Drama | |
| Sajenko the Soviet | Erich Waschneck | Michael Bohnen, Suzy Vernon | Drama | |
| Salamander | Grigori Roshal | Bernhard Goetzke; Nikolay Khmelyov | Drama | Co-production with Soviet Union |
| Scampolo | Augusto Genina | Carmen Boni, Livio Pavanelli | Comedy | |
| The Schorrsiegel Affair | Jaap Speyer | Bernhard Goetzke, Walter Rilla | Silent | |
| The Secret Courier | Gennaro Righelli | Lil Dagover, Ivan Mozzhukhin | Adventure | |
| Secrets of the Orient | Alexandre Volkoff | Iván Petrovich, Gaston Modot | Drama | |
| Serenissimus and the Last Virgin | Leo Mittler | Hans Junkermann, Adolphe Engers, Adele Sandrock | Silent | |
| The Serfs | Richard Eichberg | Heinrich George, Mona Maris | Drama | |
| Sensations-Prozess | Friedrich Feher | Gustav Diessl, Anton Edthofer | Silent | |
| Sex in Chains | William Dieterle | William Dieterle, Gunnar Tolnæs | Drama | |
| Shiraz | Franz Osten | Himansu Rai, Enakshi Rama Rao | Drama | Co-production with UK and India |
| Single Mother | Fred Sauer | Victor Colani, Werner Fuetterer | Drama | |
| Sin | Gustaf Molander | Lars Hanson, Elissa Landi, Gina Manès | Drama | Co-production with Sweden |
| The Sinner | Mario Bonnard | Elisabeth Pinajeff, Hans Stüwe | Drama | |
| Sir or Madam | Carl Boese | Percy Marmont; Ossi Oswalda | Comedy | Co-production with Britain |
| Six Girls and a Room for the Night | Hans Behrendt | Georg Alexander, Jenny Jugo | Comedy | |
| Sixteen Daughters and No Father | Adolf Trotz | Paul Graetz, Camilla Spira | Comedy | |
| Snowshoe Bandits | Uwe Jens Krafft | Aud Egede-Nissen, Paul Richter | Comedy | |
| Song | Richard Eichberg | Anna May Wong, Heinrich George | Drama | Co-production with Britain |
| Spione (Spies) | Fritz Lang | Rudolf Klein-Rogge | Thriller, Spy film | |
| Spy of Madame Pompadour | Karl Grune | Liane Haid, Fritz Kortner | Historical | |
| The Story of a Little Parisian | Augusto Genina | Carmen Boni, André Roanne | Silent | Co-production with France and Italy |
| The Strange Night of Helga Wangen | Holger-Madsen | Lee Parry, Francis Lederer | Silent | |
| Strauss Is Playing Today | Conrad Wiene | Alfred Abel, Hermine Sterler | Drama | |
| Struggle for the Matterhorn | Mario Bonnard, Nunzio Malasomma | Luis Trenker, Marcella Albani | Mountain | |
| Suzy Saxophone | Carl Lamac | Anny Ondra, Hans Albers | Comedy | Co-production with France |
| Tales from the Vienna Woods | Jaap Speyer | Albert Paulig, Magnus Stifter | Silent | |
| Theatre | Mario Bonnard | Marcella Albani, Heinrich George | Silent | |
| Thérèse Raquin | Jacques Feyder | Gina Manès, Hans Adalbert Schlettow | Drama | |
| The Three Women of Urban Hell | Jaap Speyer | Mona Maris, Fred Doederlein | Silent | |
| Today I Was With Frieda | Siegfried Philippi | Hans Albers, Evi Eva | Silent | |
| Tragedy at the Royal Circus | Alfred Lind | Bernhard Goetzke, Ellen Kürti | Drama | |
| Two Red Roses | Robert Land | Liane Haid, Alexander Murski | Silent | |
| Under Suspicion | Constantin J. David | Hanni Weisse, Gritta Ley | Crime | |
| Under the Lantern | Gerhard Lamprecht | Lissy Arna, Gerhard Dammann | Silent | |
| Vienna, City of My Dreams | Victor Janson | Liane Haid, Käthe von Nagy | Silent | |
| Villa Falconieri | Richard Oswald | Maria Jacobini, Hans Stüwe | Drama | Co-production with Italy |
| Violantha | Carl Froelich | Henny Porten, Mathilde Sussin | Silent | |
| Volga Volga | Viktor Tourjansky | Hans Adalbert Schlettow, Lillian Hall-Davis | Drama | |
| The Weekend Bride | Georg Jacoby | Elga Brink, Werner Fuetterer | Comedy | |
| When the Guard Marches | Hans Steinhoff | Claire Rommer, Fred Solm | Comedy | |
| When the Mother and the Daughter | Carl Boese | Fritz Spira, Trude Hesterberg | Silent | |
| Whirl of Youth | Richard Eichberg | Fee Malten, Heinrich George | Drama | Co-production with Britain |
| Who Invented Divorce? | Wolfgang Neff | Hans Albers, Charlotte Ander | Silent | |
| The Woman from Till 12 | Erich Schönfelder | Dina Gralla, Werner Fuetterer | Silent | |
| Woman in Flames | Max Reichmann | Olga Chekhova, Ferdinand von Alten | Drama | |
| The Woman on the Rack | Robert Wiene | Lili Damita, Vladimir Gajdarov | Drama | |
| The Women's War | Franz Seitz Sr. | Fritz Kampers, Liane Haid | Silent | |
| A Woman with Style | Fritz Wendhausen | Mady Christians, Hans Thimig | Silent | |
| Yacht of the Seven Sins | Jacob Fleck, Luise Fleck | Brigitte Helm, John Stuart | Drama | |

== Documentaries ==
| Title | Director | Featured cast | Genre | Note |
|---|---|---|---|---|
| Als Dreijähriger durch Afrika | Colin Roß | | documentary | |
| Bits of Africa | | | documentary | released under the series title "MGM Oddities" in the US. |
| Canada - Das Land der eigenen Scholle | Karl Pindl | | documentary | |
| Children of the Sun | | | documentary | released under the series title "MGM Oddities" in the US. |
| The Eagle's Nest | | | documentary | released under the series title "MGM Oddities" in the US. |
| Erstarrte Märchenwelt | Gerhard Lamprecht | | documentary | |
| Die Filmstadt Hollywood | Max Goldschmidt | | documentary | |
| Fröhliche Pfalz | Phil Jutzi | | documentary | |
| Die glückliche Mutter | Rudolf Sieber | | documentary | |
| Golden Fleece | | | documentary | released under the series title "MGM Oddities" in the US. |
| Gottes Wundertaten unter dem Batavolk auf Sumatra | | | documentary | |
| A Happy Omen | | | documentary | released under the series title "MGM Oddities" in the US. |
| Henny Porten - Leben und Laufbahn einer Filmkünstlerin | Oskar Kalbus | | documentary | |
| Im Hornissenstaat | Wolfram Junghans | | documentary | |
| Hunderttausende im Kampf | Albrecht Viktor Blum | | documentary | |
| Im Schatten der Maschine | Albrecht Viktor Blum | | documentary | |
| Inflation | Hans Richter | | documentary | |
| Jungle Round-Up | | | documentary | released under the series title "MGM Oddities" in the US. |
| Lonely Lapland | | | documentary | released under the series title "MGM Oddities" in the US. |
| Mit Sven Hedin durch Asiens Wüsten | Rudolf Biebrach, Paul Lieberenz | | documentary | |
| Monarch of the Glen | | | documentary | released under the series title "MGM Oddities" in the US. |
| Murder | | | documentary | released under the series title "MGM Oddities" in the US. |
| Nature's Wizardry | | | documentary | released under the series title "MGM Oddities" in the US. |
| Nuri, der Elefant | Henry Stuart | | documentary | |
| Palace of Honey | | | documentary | released under the series title "MGM Oddities" in the US. |
| Perfume and Nicotine | | | documentary | released under the series title "MGM Oddities" in the US. |
| Primitive Housekeeping | | | documentary | released under the series title "MGM Oddities" in the US. |
| The Sacred Baboon | | | documentary | released under the series title "MGM Oddities" in the US. |
| Sanctuary | | | documentary | released under the series title "MGM Oddities" in the US. |
| Secrets of the Sea | | | documentary | released under the series title "MGM Oddities" in the US. |
| Sleeping Death | | | documentary | released under the series title "MGM Oddities" in the US. |
| Strange Prayers | | | documentary | released under the series title "MGM Oddities" in the US. |
| Tokens of Manhood | | | documentary | released under the series title "MGM Oddities" in the US. |
| Vom Baum zum Papier | | | documentary | |
| Vorwärts | Werner Hochbaum | | documentary | |
| Auf Vorposten im Urwald einer heidnischen Insel | Karl Pindl | | documentary | |
| Wanderung durch die Arbeit des Vaterländischen Frauenvereins vom Roten Kreuz | Gertrud David | | documentary | |
| Was wir wollen - Was wir nicht wollen | Béla Balázs, Albrecht Viktor Blum | | documentary | |
| Der Weltkrieg, 2. Teil - Des Volkes Not | Leo Lasko | | documentary | |
| Weltstadt im Grünen | Phil Jutzi | | documentary | |
| Where Kisses Come High | Arnold Fanck | Leni Riefenstahl, Luis Trenker | documentary | released under the series title "MGM Oddities" in the US. |
| Wicked Kasimir | | | documentary | released under the series title "MGM Oddities" in the US. |
| Wives for Sale | | | documentary | released under the series title "MGM Oddities" in the US. |
| World's Playgrounds | | | documentary | released under the series title "MGM Oddities" in the US. |
| Zeitbericht - Zeitgesicht | Ernst Angel, Albrecht Viktor Blum | | documentary | |

== Animation ==
| Title | Director | Featured cast | Genre | Note |
|---|---|---|---|---|
| Die chinesische Nachtigall | Julius Pinschewer | | animation | |
| Dein Schicksal | Ernö Metzner, Oskar Fischinger | | animation | produced by the SPD |
| Dr. Dolittle und seine Tiere | Lotte Reiniger | | animation | |
| Ghosts Before Breakfast | Hans Richter | | Animation | |
| Grotesken im Schnee | Lotte Reiniger, Alex Strasser | | animation | |
| Der scheintote Chinese | Lotte Reiniger | | animation | |
| Willis Zukunftstraum | Paul N. Peroff | | animation | |
