= List of German films of 1930 =

This is a list of the most notable films produced in the Cinema of Germany in 1930.

== A–L ==
| Title | Director | Cast | Genre | Notes |
|---|---|---|---|---|
| Die 400-Jahrfeier von Augsburg | Gertrud David | documentary | | |
| Achtung! - Auto-Diebe! | Harry Piel | Harry Piel, Hugo Fischer-Köppe, Dary Holm | Crime | |
| Alraune | Richard Oswald | Brigitte Helm, Albert Bassermann, Harald Paulsen | Sci-fi | Based on the story by Hanns Heinz Ewers |
| El Amor solfeando | Armand Guerra | | | |
| Anna Christie | Jacques Feyder | Greta Garbo, Theo Shall, Hans Junkermann | Drama | German Version made by MGM in Hollywood |
| Barcarolle d'amour | Carl Froelich; Henry Roussell | Simone Cerdan, Annabella | | French/German co-production |
| The Blue Angel | Josef von Sternberg | Marlene Dietrich, Emil Jannings, Kurt Gerron | Drama | Based on the story by Heinrich Mann |
| The Blonde Nightingale | Johannes Meyer | Ernst Behmer, Else Elster | Musical | |
| Bookkeeper Kremke | Marie Harder | Hermann Vallentin, Anna Sten | Drama | |
| Boycott | Robert Land | Ernst Stahl-Nachbaur, Lil Dagover | Drama | |
| Burglars | Hanns Schwarz | Ralph Arthur Roberts, Lilian Harvey, Willy Fritsch, Heinz Rühmann, Oskar Sima | Musical comedy | |
| Busy Girls | Erich Schönfelder | Lien Deyers, Ivan Koval-Samborsky | Silent drama | |
| The Cabinet of Doctor Larifari | Robert Wohlmuth | Max Hansen, Paul Morgan | Comedy | |
| The Caviar Princess | Carl Lamac | Anny Ondra, Maria Forescu | Silent comedy | |
| Chasing Fortune | Rochus Gliese | Catherine Hessling, Alexander Murski | Drama | |
| The Citadel of Warsaw | Jacob Fleck, Luise Fleck | Victor Varconi, La Jana, Adam Brodzisz | Drama | |
| The Copper | Richard Eichberg | Hans Albers Charlotte Susa | Crime | Co-production with the United Kingdom |
| The Corvette Captain | Rudolf Walther-Fein | Harry Liedtke, Lia Eibenschütz, Maria Paudler | Comedy | |
| Cyanide | Hans Tintner | Grete Mosheim, Claus Clausen | Drama | |
| Dance Into Happiness | Max Nosseck | Liselotte Schaak, Ilse Stobrawa | Musical | |
| Dangers of the Engagement Period | Fred Sauer | Marlene Dietrich, Willi Forst, Lotte Lorring | Comedy | |
| Danube Waltz | Victor Janson | Harry Liedtke, Harry Hardt | Silent | |
| Darling of the Gods | Hanns Schwarz | Emil Jannings, Renate Müller | Musical/Drama | |
| Delicatessen | Géza von Bolváry | Harry Liedtke, Georgia Lind | Comedy | |
| Dolly Gets Ahead | Anatole Litvak | Dolly Haas, Oskar Karlweis | Musical | |
| Donner, Blitz und Regen | | | documentary | |
| Dreyfus | Richard Oswald | Fritz Kortner, Grete Mosheim | Drama | |
| End of the Rainbow | Max Reichmann | Richard Tauber, Lucie Englisch | Musical | |
| Fairground People | Carl Lamac | Anny Ondra, Sig Arno | Comedy | |
| Farewell | Robert Siodmak | Brigitte Horney, Aribert Mog | Comedy drama | |
| Father and Son | Victor Sjöström | Rudolf Rittner, Franziska Kinz | Drama | Co-production with Sweden |
| Ein Feiertag in Hessen-Nassau | | | documentary | |
| Feind im Blut | Walter Ruttmann | | | |
| Fire in the Opera House | Carl Froelich | Gustav Fröhlich, Gustaf Gründgens | Drama | |
| Flachsmann the Educator | Carl Heinz Wolff | Paul Henckels, Charlotte Ander | Comedy | |
| The Flute Concert of Sanssouci | Gustav Ucicky | Otto Gebühr, Renate Müller, Hans Rehmann, Walter Janssen, Raoul Aslan, Friedrich Kayßler, Aribert Wäscher Margarete Schön | Drama | Produced by Günther Stapenhorst, written by Johannes Brandt and Walter Reisch |
| A Gentleman for Hire | Géza von Bolváry | Willi Forst, Paul Hörbiger, Elma Bulla | Comedy | |
| A Girl from the Reeperbahn | Karl Anton | Olga Chekhova, Trude Berliner | Musical | |
| The Great Longing | Steve Sekely | Camilla Horn, Theodor Loos | Comedy | |
| Der Hampelmann | E.W. Emo | | | |
| Hans in Every Street | Carl Froelich | Hans Albers, Camilla Horn | Crime | |
| Helene Willfüer, Student of Chemistry | Fred Sauer | Olga Chekhova, Ernst Stahl-Nachbaur, Elza Temary | Drama | |
| Der Herr auf Bestellung | Géza von Bolváry | | | |
| Him or Me | Harry Piel | Harry Piel, Valerie Boothby, Hans Junkermann | Thriller | |
| Hocuspocus | Gustav Ucicky | Lilian Harvey, Willy Fritsch | Comedy | |
| How Do I Become Rich and Happy? | Max Reichmann | Georgia Lind, Hugo Schrader | Musical | |
| Iß gut und bleibe schlank | Hans-Jürgen Völcker | | documentary | |
| The Immortal Vagabond | Joe May | Liane Haid, Gustav Fröhlich | Musical | |
| It Happens Every Day | Adolf Trotz | Walter Rilla, Margarete Kupfer | Drama | |
| The Jumping Jack | E.W. Emo | Max Hansen, S.Z. Sakall, Lien Deyers | Comedy | |
| Der Kampf mit dem Drachen oder: Die Tragödie des Untermieters | Robert Siodmak | | | |
| Kirmes in Hollywood | Julius Pinschewer | | animation | |
| Kohlhiesel's Daughters | Hans Behrendt | Henny Porten, Fritz Kampers | Comedy | |
| Konserven für den Winter - aber nur aus dem eigenen Betrieb | Gertrud David | documentary | | |
| Kreuz über der Großstadt | Gertrud David | documentary | | |
| Das Lämmchen | Rudi Klemm | | animation | |
| The Last Company | Curtis Bernhardt | Conrad Veidt, Karin Evans | Historical | |
| Liebesspiel | Oskar Fischinger | | Animation | |
| Lieutenant, Were You Once a Hussar? | Manfred Noa | Mady Christians, Gustav Diessl | Comedy | |
| Love and Champagne | Robert Land | Camilla von Hollay, Iván Petrovich | Comedy | |
| Love in the Ring | Reinhold Schünzel | Max Schmeling, Renate Müller | Sports | |
| The Love Market | Heinz Paul | Jean Murat, Erna Morena | Silent | |
| Love's Carnival | Hans Steinhoff | Lien Deyers, Mathias Wieman | Drama | |

== M–Z ==
| Title | Director | Cast | Genre | Notes |
|---|---|---|---|---|
| Make the World a Paradise For Me | Paul Merzbach | Gösta Ekman, Anita Dorris, Rolf von Goth, Albert Paulig, Károly Huszár | Comedy | Co-production wuth Sweden |
| Man schenkt sich Rosen, wenn man verliebt ist | Siegfried Dessauer | Grit Haid, Oscar Marion | Romance | |
| The Man in the Dark | Edmund Heuberger | Carl Auen, Edith Meinhard | Thriller | |
| Marriage in Name Only | Heinz Paul | Evelyn Holt, Erika Dannhoff | Drama | |
| Marriage Strike | Carl Boese | Livio Pavanelli, Maria Paudler | Comedy | |
| Mediterranean Cruise | | | documentary | |
| Die Meistersinger | Paul N. Peroff | | animation | |
| Mischievous Miss | Erich Schönfelder | Julius Falkenstein, Dina Gralla | Silent comedy | |
| Money on the Street | Georg Jacoby | Georg Alexander, Hans Moser | Comedy | Co-production with Austria |
| Morals at Midnight | Marc Sorkin | Gustav Diessl, Camilla Horn | Romance | |
| Next, Please! | Erich Schönfelder | Adele Sandrock, Albert Paulig | Comedy | |
| Night Birds | Richard Eichberg | Jack Raine, Muriel Angelus | Thriller | Co-production with UK |
| O Mädchen, mein Mädchen, wie lieb' ich Dich! | Carl Boese, Rudolf Walther-Fein | Harry Liedtke, Margarete Kupfer | Comedy | |
| Of Life and Death | Edmund Heuberger | Eddie Polo, Rina Marsa | Thriller | |
| Oh Those Glorious Old Student Days | Rolf Randolf | Werner Fuetterer, Fritz Alberti, Betty Amann | Comedy | |
| The Old Song | Erich Waschneck | Lil Dagover, Lien Deyers, Igo Sym | Drama | |
| The Other | Robert Wiene | Fritz Kortner, Käthe von Nagy | Drama | French language version The Prosecutor Hallers also produced |
| Pension Schöller | Georg Jacoby | Paul Henckels, Elga Brink | Comedy | |
| People in the Fire | Harry Piel | Harry Piel, Nico Turoff, Lotte Lorring | Drama | |
| People on Sunday | Robert Siodmak, Curt Siodmak | Valeska Gert, Kurt Gerron | Drama | |
| Police Spy 77 | Willi Wolff | Ellen Richter, Nikolai Malikoff | Crime | |
| Der quakende Narr | Paul N. Peroff | | animation | |
| Rag Ball | Carl Heinz Wolff | Harry Frank, Kurt Lilien, Georgia Lind | Comedy | |
| Am Rande der Sahara | Rudolf Biebrach, Martin Rikli | | documentary | |
| Rendezvous | Carl Boese | Lucie Englisch, Ralph Arthur Roberts | Musical | |
| Retreat on the Rhine | Jaap Speyer | Charlotte Susa, Hans Stüwe | Comedy | |
| The Rhineland Girl | Johannes Meyer | Lucie Englisch, Werner Fuetterer | Musical | |
| The Right to Love | Jacob Fleck, Luise Fleck | Georg Alexander, Evelyn Holt | Drama | |
| Rivals for the World Record | Ernö Metzner | Liselotte Schaak, Robert Garrison | Sports | |
| The Road to Paradise | Wilhelm Thiele, Max de Vaucorbeil | Lillian Harvey, Henri Garat | Musical | |
| 'Roah-Roah!' Der Schrei der Sehnsucht | Ludwig Kohl-Larsen | | documentary | |
| Rooms to Let | Carl Wilhelm | Lucie Englisch, Elisabeth Pinajeff | Comedy | |
| Rotterdam | Albrecht Viktor Blum, Friedrich von Maydell | | documentary | |
| Scandalous Eva | Georg Wilhelm Pabst | Henny Porten, Oskar Sima | Comedy | |
| The Shot in the Sound Film Studio | Alfred Zeisler | Gerda Maurus, Harry Frank, Berthe Ostyn | Mystery | |
| The Singing City | Carmine Gallone | Jan Kiepura, Brigitte Helm, Walter Janssen | Musical | |
| The Son of the White Mountain | Mario Bonnard, Luis Trenker | Luis Trenker, Renate Müller | Romance | |
| Im Schatten der Weltstadt | Albrecht Viktor Blum | | documentary | |
| The Song Is Ended | Géza von Bolváry | Liane Haid, Willi Forst | Musical | |
| Rot Sport marschiert | Albrecht Viktor Blum | | documentary | |
| In den Spuren Vater Bodelschwinghs | Gertrud David | documentary | | |
| The Stolen Face | Philipp Lothar Mayring | Hans Otto, Friedl Haerlin | Crime | |
| A Student's Song of Heidelberg | Karl Hartl | Willi Forst, Betty Bird | Musical | |
| Studie Nr. 2 | Oskar Fischinger | | Animation | |
| Studie Nr. 3 | Oskar Fischinger | | Animation | |
| Studie Nr. 4 | Oskar Fischinger | | Animation | |
| Studie Nr. 5 | Oskar Fischinger | | Animation | |
| Studie Nr. 6 | Oskar Fischinger | | Animation | |
| Susanne Cleans Up | Eugen Thiele | Truus Van Aalten, Francis Lederer, Albert Paulig | Comedy | |
| A Tango for You | Géza von Bolváry | Willi Forst, Fee Malten | Musical | |
| A Thousand Words of German | Georg Jacoby | Carl Schenstrøm, Harald Madsen, Paul Westermeier | Comedy | |
| Three Days Confined to Barracks | Carl Boese | Max Adalbert, Ida Wüst | Comedy | |
| The Three from the Filling Station | Wilhelm Thiele | Willy Fritsch, Lilian Harvey, Heinz Rühmann | Comedy | French language version Le chemin du paradis also produced |
| The Tiger Murder Case | Johannes Meyer | Charlotte Susa, Harry Frank | Mystery | |
| Tingel-Tangel | Jaap Speyer | Elisabeth Pinajeff, Ernő Verebes, Fritz Kampers | Comedy | |
| Die Todeszeche | Phil Jutzi | | documentary | |
| Troika | Vladimir Strizhevsky | Hans Adalbert Schlettow, Hilde von Stolz, Olga Chekhova | Drama | |
| Twice Married | E.W. Emo | Liane Haid, Ralph Arthur Roberts, Lucie Englisch | Comedy | |
| Two Hearts in Waltz Time | Géza von Bolváry | Walter Janssen, Willi Forst | Musical | |
| Two People | Erich Waschneck | Charlotte Susa, Gustav Fröhlich | Drama | Co-production with UK |
| Venezianische Serenade | Julius Pinschewer | | animation | |
| Vienna, City of Song | Richard Oswald | Charlotte Ander, Paul Morgan | Musical | |
| The Waltz King | Manfred Noa | Hans Stüwe, Claire Rommer | Historical | |
| Waltz of Love | Wilhelm Thiele | Lilian Harvey, Willy Fritsch | Musical | |
| Weekend | Walter Ruttmann | | | |
| Westfront 1918 | Georg Wilhelm Pabst | Fritz Kampers, Gustav Diessl | War | |
| The White Devil | Alexandre Volkoff | Ivan Mozzhukhin, Lil Dagover, Betty Amann | Historical | |
| The Widow's Ball | Georg Jacoby | Lucie Englisch, Fritz Kampers, Sig Arno | Comedy | |
| Windjammer und Janmaaten - Die letzten Segelschiffe | Heinrich Hauser | | documentary | |
| Witnesses Wanted | Edmund Heuberger | Eddie Polo, Lotte Stein | Silent mystery | |
| The Woman Without Nerves | Willi Wolff | Ellen Richter, Walter Janssen, Anton Pointner | Adventure | |
| You'll Be in My Heart | Max Reichmann | Camilla Horn, Fritz Schulz, Victor Varconi | Drama | |
| Zehn Minuten Mozart | Lotte Reiniger | | animation | |
| Zeitprobleme: wie der Arbeiter wohnt | Slatan Dudow | | documentary | |
