= Love in the Snow =

1929 film

- Directed by: Max Obal; Rudolf Walther-Fein
- Written by: Alfred Halm
- Produced by: Gabriel Levy
- Starring: Livio Pavanelli; Maria Paudler; Georg Alexander
- Cinematography: Edoardo Lamberti; Guido Seeber
- Music by: Bernard Homola
- Production company: Aafa-Film
- Distributed by: Aafa-Film
- Release date: 15 January 1929
- Country: Germany
- Languages: Silent; German intertitles

Love in the Snow (German: Liebe im Schnee) is a 1929 German silent film directed by Max Obal and Rudolf Walther-Fein and starring Livio Pavanelli, Maria Paudler and Georg Alexander.

The art direction was by Botho Hoefer and Hans Minzloff.

== Cast ==
- Livio Pavanelli as Dr. Reißner
- Maria Paudler as Hella, seine Gattin
- Georg Alexander as Dr. Gonter
- Iwa Wanja as Snucks, ein Skihaserl
- Jakob Tiedtke as Reynold, Großkaufmann
- Steffie Vida

== Bibliography ==
- Hans-Michael Bock and Tim Bergfelder. The Concise Cinegraph: An Encyclopedia of German Cinema. Berghahn Books, 2009.
