= My Friend Harry =

1928 film

- Directed by: Rudolf Walther-Fein; Max Obal
- Written by: Hans Rameau
- Based on: Jack McGill's Secret Mission by Ludwig von Wohl
- Starring: Harry Liedtke; Maria Paudler; Otto Wallburg
- Cinematography: Edoardo Lamberti; Guido Seeber
- Music by: Felix Bartsch
- Production company: Aafa Film
- Distributed by: Aafa Film
- Release date: 27 January 1928
- Country: Germany
- Languages: Silent; German intertitles

My Friend Harry (German: Mein Freund Harry) is a 1928 German silent comedy film directed by Max Obal and Rudolf Walther-Fein and starring Harry Liedtke, Maria Paudler and Otto Wallburg. It is based on the 1926 novel Jack McGill's Secret Mission by Ludwig von Wohl It was shot at the Staaken Studios in Berlin. The film's sets were designed by the art directorss Botho Hoefer and Hans Minzloff.

== Cast ==
- Harry Liedtke as Harry Gill
- Maria Paudler as May Elliot
- Otto Wallburg as General Director Fredy Sanderson
- Bruno Kastner as Luigi Vicelli
- Rina Maggi as Diane de Lusigny
- Cord Morton as Ein Artist
- Ida Wüst as Die Tante
- Karl Falkenberg as Ein Diener

== Bibliography ==
- Goble, Alan. The Complete Index to Literary Sources in Film. Walter de Gruyter, 1999.
