= The Carnival Prince =

1928 film

- Directed by: Rudolf Walther-Fein
- Written by: Walter Reisch
- Produced by: Gabriel Levy
- Starring: Marianne Winkelstern; Harry Liedtke; Hans Junkermann
- Cinematography: Edoardo Lamberti; Guido Seeber
- Production company: Aafa-Film
- Distributed by: Aafa-Film
- Release date: 22 December 1928
- Country: Germany
- Languages: Silent; German intertitles

The Carnival Prince (German: Der Faschingsprinz) is a 1928 German silent film directed by Rudolf Walther-Fein and starring Marianne Winkelstern, Harry Liedtke and Hans Junkermann.

The film's art direction was by Botho Hoefer and Hans Minzloff.

== Cast ==
- Marianne Winkelstern
- Harry Liedtke
- Hans Junkermann
- Julia Serda
- Valeria Blanka
- Kurt Vespermann
- Hermann Picha
- Antonie Jaeckel
- Irene Krauß

== Bibliography ==
- Günter Krenn. Walter Reisch: Film schreiben. Verlag Filmarchiv Austria, 2004.
