= Robert and Bertram =

Robert and Bertram (German: Robert und Bertram) may refer to:

- Robert and Bertram (ballet), an 1841 ballet of composers Cesare Pugni and Johann Schmidt
- Robert and Bertram (play), an 1856 play by Gustav Räder
- Robert and Bertram (opera), an 1888 opera by Kazimierz Hofman
- Robert and Bertram (1915 film), a silent German film adaptation directed by Max Mack
- Robert and Bertram (1928 film), a silent German film adaptation directed by Rudolf Walther-Fein
- Robert and Bertram (1938 film), a Polish film adaptation directed by Mieczysław Krawicz
- Robert and Bertram (1939 film), a German film adaptation directed by Hans H. Zerlett
- Robert and Bertram (1961 film), a German film adaptation directed by Hans Deppe
