= The Game of Love (1928 film) =

1928 film

- Directed by: Victor Janson
- Written by: Jane Bess; Rudolph Cartier; Berthold L. Seidenstein; Joseph Than
- Starring: Harry Liedtke; Hilda Rosch; Kurt Vespermann
- Cinematography: Robert Lach; Guido Seeber
- Production company: Aafa-Film
- Distributed by: Aafa-Film
- Release date: 16 October 1928
- Country: Germany
- Languages: Silent; German intertitles

The Game of Love (German: Das Spiel mit der Liebe) is a 1928 German silent film directed by Victor Janson and starring Harry Liedtke, Hilda Rosch and Kurt Vespermann.

The film's art direction was by Botho Hoefer and Hans Minzloff.

== Cast ==
- Harry Liedtke as Harry Kent
- Hilda Rosch as Miss Lilian Tompson / Marchesa Beatrice de Castell
- Kurt Vespermann as Günther Hilpert
- Iwa Wanja as Kitty Hilpert
- Victor Janson as Juan Borgo
- Alex Sascha as Allgeier

== Bibliography ==
- Hans-Michael Bock and Tim Bergfelder. The Concise Cinegraph: An Encyclopedia of German Cinema. Berghahn Books, 2009.
