= Robert and Bertram (1928 film) =

1928 film

- Hungarian poster
- Directed by: Rudolf Walther-Fein
- Written by: Gustav Räder (play); Franz Rauch
- Starring: Harry Liedtke; Fritz Kampers; Elizza La Porta; Dolly Grey
- Cinematography: Viktor Gluck; Guido Seeber
- Production company: Aafa-Film
- Distributed by: Aafa-Film
- Release date: 1928
- Country: Germany
- Languages: Silent; German intertitles

Robert and Bertram (German: Robert und Bertram) is a 1928 German silent comedy film directed by Rudolf Walther-Fein and starring Harry Liedtke, Fritz Kampers and Elizza La Porta. The film was shot at the Staaken Studios in Berlin with sets designed by the art directors Botho Höfer and Hans Minzloff. It is based on the 1856 Gustav Räder play Robert and Bertram about the adventures of two wandering vagrants.

== Cast ==
- Harry Liedtke as Robert Leonhard
- Fritz Kampers as Bertram Engelke
- Elizza La Porta as Melontha
- Dolly Grey as Evelyne Parker
- Carl Geppert as Greenhorn, ihr Sekretär
- Hermann Picha as Knurrhahn, Amtsvorsteher
- Fritz Greiner as Zirkusdirektor
- Alice Torning as Frau des Zirkusdirektors
- Carl Neisser as 1st Vagabond
- Franz Stein as 2nd Vagabond

== Bibliography ==
- Bergfelder, Tim & Bock, Hans-Michael. The Concise Cinegraph: Encyclopedia of German. Berghahn Books, 2009.
