= Tempo! Tempo! =

1929 film directed by Max Obal

- Directed by: Max Obal
- Written by: Max Obal; Hans Rameau
- Produced by: Gabriel Levy; Rudolf Walther-Fein
- Starring: Luciano Albertini; Trude Berliner; Oreste Bilancia
- Cinematography: Edoardo Lamberti; Guido Seeber
- Music by: Bernard Homola
- Production company: Aafa-Film
- Distributed by: Aafa-Film
- Release date: 8 February 1929
- Running time: 78 minutes
- Country: Germany
- Languages: Silent; German intertitles

Tempo! Tempo! is a 1929 German silent adventure film directed by Max Obal and starring Luciano Albertini, Trude Berliner and Oreste Bilancia. It was shot at the Staaken Studios in Berlin and on location on the Italian Riviera. The film's art direction was by Botho Hoefer and Hans Minzloff.

== Cast ==
In alphabetical order

- Luciano Albertini as Lilso Lagard
- Trude Berliner as Mila
- Oreste Bilancia as Luigi Vespa
- Fritz Kampers as Jolly Baker
- Hermann Picha as Tito Tartini
- Arthur Reppert as Pit
- Hilda Rosch as Imogen Robinson
- Angelo Rossi as Orge
- Johannes Roth as Pot

== Bibliography ==
- Bock, Hans-Michael & Bergfelder, Tim. The Concise CineGraph. Encyclopedia of German Cinema. Berghahn Books, 2009.
