= Lightning (1925 film) =

1925 film

- Directed by: Rudolf Walther-Fein
- Written by: Henrik Orel
- Produced by: Rudolf Dworsky
- Cinematography: Kurt Lande
- Production company: Althoff-Ambos-Film
- Distributed by: Aafa Film
- Release date: 27 March 1925
- Country: Germany
- Languages: Silent; German intertitles

Lightning (German:Wetterleuchten) is a 1925 German silent drama film directed by Rudolf Walther-Fein.

The film's art direction was by Botho Hoefer and Bernhard Schwidewski

== Cast ==
In alphabetical order

- Victor Colani
- William Dieterle
- Lia Eibenschütz
- Kara Guhl
- Oscar Marion
- Frida Richard
- Alphons Schünemann

== Bibliography ==
- Grange, William. Cultural Chronicle of the Weimar Republic. Scarecrow Press, 2008.
