= Delicatessen (disambiguation) =

Delicatessen is a term for fine food.

Delicatessen may also refer to:

- Delicatessen (1991 film), a French black comedy film
- Delicatessen (1930 film), a German romance film
- Delicatessen (band), an English indie-rock group

== See also ==
- Delicacy (film) or La délicatesse, a 2011 French romantic comedy-drama film
- Delikatessen, an album by the German band Oomph!
