= Marriage Strike =

Marriage Strike may refer to:

- Marriage Strike (1930 film), German silent comedy
- Marriage Strike (1935 film), German comedy
- Marriage Strike (1953 film), German comedy remake of 1935 film
