= My Heart Longs for Love =

1931 film

- Directed by: Eugen Thiele
- Written by: Franz Rauch; Eugen Thiele
- Produced by: Gabriel Levy; Rudolf Walther-Fein
- Starring: Trude Berliner; Max Adalbert; Johannes Riemann
- Cinematography: Guido Seeber
- Edited by: Ladislao Vajda
- Music by: Leo Leux
- Production company: Aafa Film
- Distributed by: Aafa Film
- Release date: 14 September 1931
- Running time: 92 minutes
- Country: Germany
- Language: German

My Heart Longs for Love (German: Mein Herz sehnt sich nach Liebe) is a 1931 German musical romance film directed by Eugen Thiele and starring Trude Berliner, Max Adalbert and Johannes Riemann. The film's sets were designed by the art directors Botho Hoefer and Bernhard Schwidewski.

== Cast ==
- Trude Berliner as Elly Wallis
- Max Adalbert as Anton Heberlein
- Johannes Riemann as Dr. Hans Agerty
- Marianne Winkelstern as Gerda
- Ernö Verebes as Fritz Heberlein
- Senta Söneland as Iduna Liebreich
- Paul Hörbiger as Gehring
- Margarete Sachse as Frl. Sauerzapf
- Kurt Lilien as Portier
- Karl Wagner
- Arthur Reppert
- Oskar Höcker

== Bibliography ==
- Bock, Hans-Michael & Bergfelder, Tim. The Concise Cinegraph: Encyclopaedia of German Cinema. Berghahn Books, 2009.
- Parish, James Robert. Film Actors Guide: Western Europe. Scarecrow Press, 1977.
- Klaus, Ulrich J. Deutsche Tonfilme: Jahrgang 1931. Klaus-Archiv, 1988.
