= Foolish Happiness =

1929 German silent film

- Directed by: Johannes Guter; Rudolf Walther-Fein
- Written by: Franz Rauch
- Starring: Maria Paudler; Livio Pavanelli; Fritz Kampers
- Cinematography: Edoardo Lamberti; Guido Seeber
- Music by: Bernard Homola
- Production company: Aafa Film
- Distributed by: Aafa Film
- Release date: 19 April 1929
- Running time: 91 minutes
- Country: Germany
- Languages: Silent; German intertitles

Foolish Happiness (German: Das närrische Glück) is a 1929 German silent comedy film directed by Johannes Guter and Rudolf Walther-Fein and starring Maria Paudler, Livio Pavanelli and Fritz Kampers. It was shot at the Staaken Studios in Berlin. The film's sets were designed by the art directors Botho Hoefer and Hans Minzloff.

== Synopsis ==
Maria is a factory employee who has big dreams to escape her ordinary lifestyle, inspired by the cheap novel she reads. She begins to act out her fantasies and to her surprise big things happen in her life. Through her introduction to the factory owner Waldenburg she finds herself cast in a film, only to emerge as a major star.

== Cast ==
- Maria Paudler as Mary Eisler
- Livio Pavanelli as Waldenburg - Fabrikbesitze
- Fritz Kampers as Jonny Eisler
- Margarete Kupfer as Frau Eisler
- Otto Wallburg as Doctor Borowsky - Naturforscher
- Paul Henckels as Graf Lossen
- Hermann Picha as Doctor Conradi
- Gustav Czimeg as Malwing - Maler
- Bruno Eichgrün as Regisseur
- Robert Garrison as Filmdirektor
- Irene Krauß as Heiratsvermittlerin
- Karl Platen as Waldenburgs Sekretär
- Valeria Blanka as Frau Borowsky
- Eberhard Leithoff as Komponist

== Bibliography ==
- Gerhard Lamprecht. Deutsche Stummfilme: 1927-1931.
