= Youth of the Big City =

1929 film

- Directed by: Rudolf Walther-Fein
- Written by: Franz Rauch
- Starring: Harry Liedtke; Ida Wüst; Maria Paudler
- Cinematography: Edoardo Lamberti; Guido Seeber
- Production company: Aafa-Film
- Distributed by: Aafa-Film
- Release date: 24 May 1929
- Country: Germany
- Languages: Silent; German intertitles

Youth of the Big City (German: Grosstadtjugend) is a 1929 German silent drama film directed by Rudolf Walther-Fein and starring Harry Liedtke, Ida Wüst and Maria Paudler. The film's sets were designed by the art directors Botho Hoefer and Hans Minzloff.

== Cast ==
- Harry Liedtke as Dr. phil. Axel v. Rohdenbeck
- Ida Wüst as Frau Emma Lüders
- Maria Paudler as Magda Lüders, ihre Tochter
- Helmut Gauer as Hans Lüders, ihr Sohn
- Gustav Rickelt as Otto Gericke, Margarine en gros
- Trude Lehmann as Ottilie Gericke, seine Gattin
- Alex Sascha as Graf Tomasini
- Carl Auen as Armin Eggebrecht
- Hermann Picha as Kunibert Wespe, Detektiv
- Hilde Auen as Elli
- Wilhelm Diegelmann as Der Wirt
- Sylvia Torf as Die Wirtin
- Max Maximilian as 1. Strolch
- Alfred Loretto as 2. Strolch

== Bibliography ==
- Grange, William. Cultural Chronicle of the Weimar Republic. Scarecrow Press, 2008.
