= Hungarian Nights =

1929 film

- Directed by: Victor Janson
- Written by: Guido Kreutzer; Franz Rauch
- Produced by: Gabriel Levy; Rudolf Walther-Fein
- Starring: Lil Dagover; Hans Stüwe; Alexander Murski
- Cinematography: Edoardo Lamberti; Guido Seeber
- Music by: Bernard Homola
- Production company: Aafa-Film
- Distributed by: Aafa-Film
- Release date: 6 September 1929
- Running time: 85 minutes
- Country: Germany
- Languages: Silent; German intertitles

Hungarian Nights or Night Is Whispering (German: Es flüstert die Nacht) is a 1929 German silent drama film directed by Victor Janson and starring Lil Dagover, Hans Stüwe and Alexander Murski.

The film's sets were designed by Botho Hoefer and Hans Minzloff.

== Cast ==
- Lil Dagover as Coraly Rekoczi
- Hans Stüwe as Capt. Arpad Bartok
- Alexander Murski as Col. Elemer Rekoczi
- Wilhelm Diegelmann as Kalman Bartok
- Daisy D'Ora as Ilona Bartok
- Harry Hardt as Lt. Bela Bezeredi
- Veit Harlan as Zoltan, servant
- Paul Henckels
- Margot Zirow
- Trude Berliner
- Karl Elzer as Major

== Bibliography ==
- Parish, Robert. Film Actors Guide. Scarecrow Press, 1977.
