= Three from the Unemployment Office =

1932 film

- Directed by: Eugen Thiele
- Written by: Georg C. Klaren; F.A. Reicher; Paul Michael Bünger
- Produced by: Paul Michael Bünger; Heinz Schall
- Starring: Fritz Kampers; Paul Kemp; Anton Walbrook; Evelyn Holt
- Cinematography: Guido Seeber; Hugo von Kaweczynski
- Music by: Hugo Hirsch
- Production company: Panzer Filmproduktion
- Release date: 29 February 1932
- Running time: 90 minutes
- Country: Germany
- Language: German

Three from the Unemployment Office (German: Drei von der Stempelstelle) is a 1932 German comedy film directed by Eugen Thiele and starring Fritz Kampers, Paul Kemp and Anton Walbrook. The film was shot at the Staaken Studios in Berlin. It premiered on 29 February 1932. The film's title alludes to the 1930 hit The Three from the Filling Station.

== Cast ==
- Fritz Kampers as Fritz Wenneis, Arbeitsloser
- Paul Kemp as Arthur Jaenicke, Arbeitsloser
- Anton Walbrook as Max Binder, Arbeitsloser
- Evelyn Holt as Else, deren Tochter
- Margarete Kupfer as Mutter Gohlke, Wäscherin
- Ferdinand von Alten as Kienast, Chef eines Modesalons
- Helen Schöner as Frau Kienast
- Margita Alfvén as Die Directrice
- Marion Moench as Lotte
- Elsa Wagner as Die Vermieterin
- Hedwig Wangel as Die Wohlfahrtsdame
- Hilde Maroff as Laufmädel bei Kienast
- Arthur Mainzer
- Julius Brandt
- Ernst Morgan
- Carl Peterhans
- Hans Schüren
- Antonie Jaeckel

== Bibliography ==
- Grange, William. Cultural Chronicle of the Weimar Republic. Scarecrow Press, 2008.
- Klaus, Ulrich J. Deutsche Tonfilme: Jahrgang 1932. Klaus-Archiv, 1988.
