= Intrigue (1920 film) =

1920 film

- Directed by: Paul L. Stein
- Written by: Franz Rauch; Paul L. Stein
- Produced by: Paul Davidson
- Starring: Pola Negri; Eduard von Winterstein
- Cinematography: Fritz Arno Wagner
- Production company: PAGU
- Distributed by: UFA
- Release date: 15 October 1920
- Running time: 82 minutes
- Country: Germany
- Languages: Silent; German intertitles

Intrigue or The Martyrium (German: Das Martyrium) is a 1920 German silent drama film directed by Paul L. Stein and starring Pola Negri and Eduard von Winterstein.

== Cast ==
In alphabetical order

- Pola Negri as Gattin
- Eduard von Winterstein as Der Gatte, ein Aristokrat
- Ernst Hofmann as Verliebter Neffe
- Hans Kuhnert as Silvio de Montebello
- Frieda Lemke as Lisa
- Hermann Pfanz as Giovanni Basso, Schloßverwalter
- Ernst Stahl-Nachbaur as Luigi Paoli, Sekretär des Marchese

== Bibliography ==
- Mariusz Kotowski. Pola Negri: Hollywood's First Femme Fatale. University Press of Kentucky, 2014.
