= The Hobgoblin (1924 film) =

1924 film by Paul Merzbach

- Directed by: Paul Merzbach
- Written by: Jacques Cazotte (novella); Julius Sternheim
- Produced by: Julius Sternheim
- Starring: Evi Eva; Wilhelm Diegelmann; Harry Hardt
- Cinematography: Reimar Kuntze; Guido Seeber
- Production company: Sternheim-Film
- Distributed by: National Film
- Release date: 22 May 1924
- Country: Germany
- Languages: Silent; German intertitles

The Hobgoblin (German: Der Klabautermann) is a 1924 German silent thriller film directed by Paul Merzbach and starring Evi Eva, Wilhelm Diegelmann and Harry Hardt. In Berlin it premiered at the Marmorhaus.

The film's art direction was by Botho Hoefer.

== Cast ==
- Evi Eva as Marja
- Wilhelm Diegelmann as William Russell
- Harry Hardt as Holger, sein Neffe
- Kläre Grieger
- Ludwig Andersen as Kapitän Leeds
- Rolf Jäger as Francois Duval
- Hans Trautner as Dr. Fred Maclin

== Bibliography ==
- Grange, William. Cultural Chronicle of the Weimar Republic. Scarecrow Press, 2008.
