= The Indiscreet Woman =

1927 film directed by Carl Boese

- Directed by: Carl Boese
- Written by: Friedrich Raff (novel); Walter Reisch
- Starring: Jenny Jugo; Maria Paudler; Georg Alexander
- Cinematography: Carl Drews
- Music by: Willy Schmidt-Gentner
- Production company: Phoebus Film
- Distributed by: Phoebus Film
- Release date: 25 November 1927
- Country: Germany
- Languages: Silent; German intertitles

The Indiscreet Woman (German: Die indiskrete Frau) is a 1927 German silent comedy film directed by Carl Boese and starring Jenny Jugo, Maria Paudler and Georg Alexander.

The film's sets were designed by the art director Franz Schroedter.

== Cast ==
- Jenny Jugo as Frau Marschall
- Maria Paudler as Frau Leon
- Georg Alexander as Herr Marschall
- Kurt Vespermann as Herr Leon
- Paul Graetz as Noel
- Julius Falkenstein as Der Baron
- Sinaida Korolenko as Tänzerin
- Jaro Fürth as Der Herr Hofrat

== Bibliography ==
- Bock, Hans-Michael & Bergfelder, Tim. The Concise CineGraph. Encyclopedia of German Cinema. Berghahn Books, 2009.
