= The Violet Eater =

1926 film

- Directed by: Frederic Zelnik
- Written by: Hans Behrendt; Fanny Carlsen; Gustav von Moser (play)
- Produced by: Frederic Zelnik
- Starring: Lil Dagover; Harry Liedtke; Ernö Verebes
- Cinematography: Frederik Fuglsang
- Music by: Willy Schmidt-Gentner
- Production company: Friedrich Zelnick-Film
- Distributed by: Deutsche Lichtspiel-Syndikat
- Release date: 20 September 1926
- Running time: 91 minutes
- Country: Germany
- Languages: Silent; German intertitles

The Violet Eater (German: Der Veilchenfresser) is a 1926 German silent comedy film directed by Frederic Zelnik and starring Lil Dagover, Harry Liedtke and Ernö Verebes. It was shot at the Staaken Studios in Berlin. The film's sets were designed by the art director Andrej Andrejew. It premiered at the Marmorhaus in Germany's capital.

== Cast ==
- Lil Dagover as Melitta von Arthof
- Harry Liedtke as Victor von Ronay
- Ernö Verebes as Bobby Sterzl
- Theodor Loos as Herr von Golitzki
- Dary Holm as Frau von Routt
- Evi Eva as Lilly Niedegg
- Hans Behrendt as Peter
- Maria Paudler as Resi
- Gustav Adolf Semler as Rittmeister
- Ernst Behmer as Wachtmeister
- Ida Perry

== Bibliography ==
- Grange, William. Cultural Chronicle of the Weimar Republic. Scarecrow Press, 2008.
