= Queen of Fashion =

1929 German film

- Directed by: Max Obal; Rudolf Walther-Fein
- Written by: Franz Rauch
- Starring: Harry Liedtke; María Corda; Ernö Verebes
- Cinematography: Guido Seeber
- Production company: Aafa-Film
- Distributed by: Aafa-Film
- Release date: 14 November 1929
- Country: Germany
- Languages: Silent; German intertitles

Queen of Fashion or The Competition Bursts (German: Königin der Mode or Die Konkurrenz platzt) is a 1929 German silent comedy film directed by Max Obal and Rudolf Walther-Fein and starring Harry Liedtke, María Corda, and Ernö Verebes.

The film's sets were designed by Botho Hoefer and Hans Minzloff.

== Cast ==
- Harry Liedtke as Bernd Jensen
- María Corda as Marion Gutman
- Ernö Verebes as Leo Sanders
- Peggy Norman as Erika Bendix
- Hermann Picha as Paul Lyon
- Karl Elzer as Graf Aranyi
- Hugo Fischer-Köppe as Max Bendix
- Ibolya Szekely

== Bibliography ==
- Hans-Michael Bock and Tim Bergfelder. The Concise Cinegraph: An Encyclopedia of German Cinema. Berghahn Books, 2009.
