= The Sun Rises (1934 film) =

1934 film

- Directed by: Willy Reiber
- Written by: Heinrich Köhler; Peter Schaeffers; Guenther Schwenn
- Produced by: Georg Witt
- Starring: Charles Kullmann; Reva Holsey; Fritz Kampers
- Cinematography: Robert Baberske
- Music by: Will Meisel
- Production company: Aafa-Film
- Distributed by: Aafa-Film
- Release date: 2 January 1934
- Country: Germany
- Language: German

The Sun Rises (German: Die Sonne geht auf) is a 1934 German musical film directed by Willy Reiber and starring Charles Kullmann, Reva Holsey and Fritz Kampers. It is in the tradition of operetta films.

== Cast ==
- Charles Kullmann as Günther Peters
- Reva Holsey as Marie-Luise
- Fritz Kampers as Gustav
- Jessie Vihrog as Lieschen
- Sophie Pagay as Günthers Mutter
- Jakob Tiedtke as Marie-Luises Vater
- Rudolf Platte as Sauerwein
- Max Gülstorff as Der Manager
- Erich Bartels as Der Ansager

== Bibliography ==
- Waldman, Harry. Nazi Films in America, 1933-1942. McFarland, 2008.
