= The Violin King =

1923 film

- Directed by: Karl Otto Krause
- Written by: Franz Rauch; Karl Otto Krause
- Produced by: Karl Otto Krause
- Cinematography: Marius Holdt; Emil Schünemann
- Production company: Karl Otto Krause-Film
- Release date: 1923
- Country: Germany
- Languages: Silent; German intertitles

The Violin King (German: Der Geigerkönig) is a 1923 German silent film directed by Karl Otto Krause.

== Cast ==
In alphabetical order

- Marianne Gonia as Friederike
- Kurt Goritz as Christoph Reutter
- Sybill Morel as Edith von Hagen
- Franz Rauch as Klaus Peter
- Gustav Adolf Semler as Heinz Karsten
- Maria Zelenka as Ilse
