= Darling of the Dragoons =

1928 film

- Directed by: Rudolf Walther-Fein
- Written by: Walter Reisch
- Produced by: Gabriel Levy
- Starring: Maria Paudler; Harry Liedtke; Fritz Kampers
- Cinematography: Edoardo Lamberti; Guido Seeber
- Music by: Felix Bartsch
- Production company: Aafa-Film
- Distributed by: Aafa-Film
- Release date: 17 February 1928
- Country: Germany
- Languages: Silent; German intertitles

Darling of the Dragoons (German: Dragonerliebchen) is a 1928 German silent comedy film directed by Rudolf Walther-Fein and starring Maria Paudler, Harry Liedtke and Fritz Kampers.

== Cast ==
- Maria Paudler as Gisi
- Harry Liedtke as Oberleutnant Seppl Sterz
- Fritz Kampers as Pfiff, sein Bursche
- Hanni Weisse as Fräulein Pichalec
- Hans Junkermann as Oberst Ritter von Weidlingen
- Margarete Kupfer as Die Wirtin

== Bibliography ==
- Grange, William. Cultural Chronicle of the Weimar Republic. Scarecrow Press, 2008.
