= The Big Thief =

1922 German silent film

- Directed by: Rudolf Walther-Fein
- Starring: Colette Corder; Paul Hardtmuth; Hermann Picha
- Cinematography: Kurt Lande; Ernest Plhak
- Production company: Aafa-Film
- Distributed by: Aafa-Film
- Release date: 7 March 1922
- Country: Germany
- Languages: Silent; German intertitles

The Big Thief (German: Der große Dieb) is a 1922 German silent film directed by Rudolf Walther-Fein and starring Colette Corder, Paul Hardtmuth, and Hermann Picha.

== Cast ==
- Colette Corder
- Erwin Fichtner
- Paul Hardtmuth as Bolten
- Bernecke Heinz as George Orkny
- Rudolf Hilberg as Herght
- Hermann Picha as Branting, Generalagent der Versicherungsgesellschaft
- Marie Reigbert as Gattin Franci
- Hermann Stäbner as Bob
- Hanns Waschatko as Detektiv Hunter
