= The Treasure of Gesine Jacobsen =

1923 film

- Directed by: Rudolf Walther-Fein
- Written by: Fritz Gantzer; Willy Rath
- Starring: Marija Leiko; Paul Wegener; Reinhold Schünzel; Wilhelm Diegelmann
- Cinematography: Kurt Lande; Johannes Männling
- Production company: Aafa-Film
- Release date: 13 February 1923
- Country: Germany
- Languages: Silent; German intertitles

The Treasure of Gesine Jacobsen (German: Der Schatz der Gesine Jakobsen) is a 1923 German silent drama film directed by Rudolf Walther-Fein and starring Marija Leiko, Paul Wegener and Reinhold Schünzel. It premiered in Berlin on 13 February 1923.

== Cast ==
- Marija Leiko as Gesine Jakobsen
- Paul Wegener as Niels Nissen
- Reinhold Schünzel as Rasmussen
- Wilhelm Diegelmann as Ole Kaar
- Eduard von Winterstein as Doktor Holgersen
- Ludwig Hartau as Olaf Hinrichsen
- Emil Rameau as Jörg, Olafs Diener
- Frida Richard as Niels' Mutter
- Johannes Riemann as Klaus
- Elsa Wagner as Krankenschwester
- Antje Ammunsen as Fischersfrau
- Lise Bischoff as Niels' Sekretärin
- Paul Conradi as Werkführer
- Josef Geyer as Großknecht
- Klein Otti as der kleine Klaus
- Hermann Picha as Hafenwirt
- Ernst Pröckl as Jungkencht
- Hans Sturm as Kapitän Bruns

== Bibliography ==
- Grange, William. Cultural Chronicle of the Weimar Republic. Scarecrow Press, 2008.
