= Gentlemen Among Themselves =

1929 film

- Directed by: Rudolf Walther-Fein
- Written by: Franz Rauch
- Starring: Hermann Picha; Lydia Potechina; Maria Paudler
- Cinematography: Edoardo Lamberti; Guido Seeber
- Production company: Aafa-Film
- Distributed by: Aafa-Film
- Release date: 1 October 1929
- Country: Germany
- Languages: Silent; German intertitles

Gentlemen Among Themselves (German: Die fidele Herrenpartie or Herren unter sich) is a 1929 German silent comedy film directed by Rudolf Walther-Fein and starring Hermann Picha, Lydia Potechina and Maria Paudler. It was shot at the Staaken Studios in Berlin. The film's sets were designed by Botho Hoefer and Hans Minzloff.

== Cast ==
- Hermann Picha as Peter Fistelhahn, owner of a beauty salon
- Lydia Potechina as Brunhilde, his wife
- Maria Paudler as Wally, their daughter
- Fritz Kampers as Fritz Köster, hairdresser's assistant
- Truus Van Aalten as Erika Bollmann, apprentice
- Walter Rilla as Heinz Rüdiger, medical student
- Jaro Fürth as Dr. Egermann, physician
- Eva Speyer as Mrs. Egermann
- Gaston Briese as Master Butcher Wulkow
- Elly Nerger as Mrs. Wulkow

== Bibliography ==
- Bock, Hans-Michael & Bergfelder, Tim. The Concise Cinegraph: Encyclopaedia of German Cinema. Berghahn Books, 2009.
