= Franz Rauch =

German screenwriter and actor

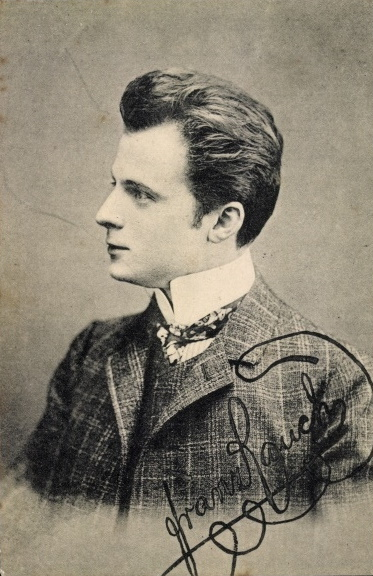
- Rauch in 1909
- Born: 15 October 1878; Stralsund, Mecklenburg-Vorpommern, German Empire
- Died: 23 May 1960 (aged 81); Berlin, Germany
- Occupations: Screenwriter, actor
- Years active: 1897–1940

Franz Rauch (15 October 1878 – 23 May 1960) was a German screenwriter and actor. He began his career as a stage actor and worked as a screenwriter on over forty films during his career and appeared in several roles as an actor.

== Selected filmography ==
- Gypsy Blood (1920)
- Intrigue (1920)
- The Violin King (1923)
- Niniche (1925)
- Weekend Magic (1927)
- The White Spider (1927)
- The Page Boy at the Golden Lion (1928)
- When the Mother and the Daughter (1928)
- Marriage (1928)
- Robert and Bertram (1928)
- Hungarian Nights (1929)
- Queen of Fashion (1929)
- Youth of the Big City (1929)
- Gentlemen Among Themselves (1929)
- Foolish Happiness (1929)
- Flachsmann the Educator (1930)
- The Corvette Captain (1930)
- Rag Ball (1930)
- Errant Husbands (1931)
- My Heart Longs for Love (1931)
- Mrs. Lehmann's Daughters (1932)
- Two Lucky Days (1932)
- Theodor Körner (1932)
- The Black Forest Girl (1933)
- When the Village Music Plays on Sunday Nights (1933)
- A Girl Whirls By the World (1934)
- Light Cavalry (1935, French)
- Light Cavalry (1935, German)
- Carousel (1937)

== Bibliography ==
- Gero Gandert. 1929. Walter de Gruyter, 1993.
