= The Adventurers (1926 film) =

1926 film directed by Rudolf Walther-Fein

- Directed by: Rudolf Walther-Fein
- Written by: Ruth Goetz; Rudolf Herzog (novel)
- Starring: Harry Liedtke; Erna Morena; Margarete Schlegel; Paul Biensfeldt
- Cinematography: Curt Oertel; Emil Schünemann
- Production company: Aafa-Film
- Distributed by: Aafa-Film
- Release date: 11 February 1926
- Country: Germany
- Languages: Silent; German intertitles

The Adventurers (German: Der Abenteurer) is a 1926 German silent adventure film directed by Rudolf Walther-Fein and starring Harry Liedtke, Erna Morena and Margarete Schlegel. The art direction was by Jacek Rotmil. The film was based on a novel by Rudolf Herzog. It premiered in Berlin on February 11, 1926.

== Cast ==
- Harry Liedtke as Dr. Josef Otten - ein berühmter Sänger
- Erna Morena as Maria, seine Frau
- Margarete Schlegel as Carmen - deren Tochter
- Paul Biensfeldt as Klaus Güllich - Ottens Faktotum
- Eduard von Winterstein as Karl Lüttgen - Hüttenwerksbesitzer
- Mady Christians as Armely - seine Frau
- Hans Brausewetter as Moritz Lachner - Akademiker
- Franz Schönfeld as Franz Terbroich - Fabriksbesitzer
- Ernst Hofmann as Laurenz - sein Sohn
- Max Menden as Der Impresario
- Maria Lingen as Marchesa della Margarita
- Robert Leffler as Der Konzertdirektor

== Bibliography ==
- Grange, William (2008). Cultural Chronicle of the Weimar Republic. Lanham, MD: Scarecrow Press. ISBN 978-0-8108-5967-8.
