= Circle of Lovers =

1927 film

- Directed by: Rudolf Walther-Fein; Rudolf Dworsky
- Written by: Ernst Klein (novel); Siegfried Philippi
- Produced by: Leo Meyer
- Starring: Hans Mierendorff; Marcella Albani; Charlotte Ander
- Cinematography: Guido Seeber
- Music by: Felix Bartsch
- Production company: Aafa-Film
- Distributed by: Aafa-Film
- Release date: 4 October 1927
- Running time: 97 minutes
- Country: Germany
- Languages: Silent; German intertitles

Circle of Lovers (German: Liebesreigen) is a 1927 German silent drama film directed by Rudolf Walther-Fein and Rudolf Dworsky and starring Hans Mierendorff, Marcella Albani, and Charlotte Ander. It was shot at the Staaken Studios in Berlin. The film's sets were by art director Jacek Rotmil.

== Cast ==
- Hans Mierendorff as Präsident Hessenberg
- Marcella Albani as Olga Hessenberg, seine 2. Frau
- Charlotte Ander as Lucie, Tochter aus 1. Ehe
- Jack Trevor as Paul Neurath, Schauspieler
- Claire Rommer as Melanie Neurath, seine Frau
- William Dieterle as Robert Baumeister, Ingenieur
- Hermann Picha as Lebrecht Haase
- Margarete Kupfer as Frau Haase
- Robert Garrison as Sergej Weratschieff

== Bibliography ==
- Grange, William. Cultural Chronicle of the Weimar Republic. Scarecrow Press, 2008.
