= The Insurmountable =

1928 film directed by Max Obal

- Directed by: Max Obal
- Written by: Max Obal; Hans Rameau
- Produced by: Gabriel Levy
- Starring: Luciano Albertini; Vivian Gibson; Paul Henckels
- Cinematography: Robert Lach; Edoardo Lamberti; Guido Seeber
- Production company: Aafa-Film
- Distributed by: Aafa-Film
- Release date: 28 August 1928
- Running time: 98 minutes
- Country: Germany
- Languages: Silent; German intertitles

The Insurmountable (German: Der Unüberwindliche) is a 1928 German silent adventure film directed by Max Obal and starring Luciano Albertini, Vivian Gibson and Paul Henckels. It was shot at the Staaken Studios in Berlin. The film's sets were designed by the art directors Botho Hoefer and Hans Minzloff.

== Cast ==
- Luciano Albertini as Silvio Spaventa
- Hilda Rosch as Rina Pera
- Paul Henckels as H. van Teen, Juwelier & Jim
- Vivian Gibson as Heloise
- Hermann Picha as Sunny, ein Faktotum
- Carl Geppert as Polizeirat Hellberg
- Alexander Sascha as Grand
- Harry Grunwald as Big
- Hans Wallner as Liska
- Robert Garrison as Farmer
- Grace Chiang as O-Nana-San
- Alfred Loretto as Polizeiwachtmeister Grigoleit
- Heinrich Gotho

== Bibliography ==
- Bock, Hans-Michael & Bergfelder, Tim. The Concise Cinegraph: Encyclopaedia of German Cinema. Berghahn Books, 2009.
