= The White Spider (1927 film) =

1927 film directed by Carl Boese

- Theatrical film poster
- German: Die weiße Spinne
- Directed by: Carl Boese
- Written by: Franz Rauch
- Starring: Maria Paudler; Walter Rilla; John Loder
- Cinematography: Alfred Hansen
- Music by: Willy Schmidt-Gentner
- Production company: Phoebus Film
- Distributed by: Phoebus Film
- Release date: 27 October 1927
- Country: Germany
- Languages: Silent; German intertitles

The White Spider (German: Die weiße Spinne) is a 1927 German silent film directed by Carl Boese and starring Maria Paudler, Walter Rilla and John Loder.

The film's sets were designed by Uwe Jens Krafft.

== Cast ==
- Maria Paudler as Miß Brown
- Walter Rilla as Lord Barrymore
- John Loder as Lord Gray
- Nien Soen Ling as Diener bei Miß Brown
- Kurt Gerron
- Wolfgang Zilzer as Diener bei Lord Barrymore
- Iris Arlan
- Uwe Jens Krafft as Der Polizeipräsident
