= In the Valleys of the Southern Rhine =

1925 film

- Directed by: Rudolf Walther-Fein; Rudolf Dworsky
- Written by: Gerd Briese; Ruth Goetz; Rudolf Herzog (novel)
- Produced by: Gabriel Levy
- Starring: Albert Steinrück; Erna Morena; Ernst Hofmann
- Cinematography: Curt Oertel; Guido Seeber
- Production company: Aafa-Film
- Distributed by: Aafa-Film
- Release date: 10 September 1925
- Country: Germany
- Languages: Silent; German intertitles

In the Valleys of the Southern Rhine (German: Die vom Niederrhein) is a 1925 German silent film directed by Rudolf Walther-Fein and Rudolf Dworsky and starring Albert Steinrück, Erna Morena, and Ernst Hofmann.

The film's art direction was by Jacek Rotmil.

== Cast ==
- Albert Steinrück as Philipp Steinherr
- Erna Morena as Frau Margot
- Ernst Hofmann as Sohn Hans
- Mady Christians as Bettina von Wittelsbach
- William Dieterle as Maler Heinz von Springe
- Uschi Elleot as Hanne Stahl
- Fritz Kampers as Oetz Honwerth
- Wilhelm Diegelmann as Maler
- Erich Kaiser-Titz as Prinz Georg Wallberg
- Max Menden as Das alte Semester
- Hermann Picha as Wirt
- Frida Richard as Hannes Großmutter

== Bibliography ==
- Grange, William. Cultural Chronicle of the Weimar Republic. Scarecrow Press, 2008.
