= Marriage (1928 film) =

1928 film

- Directed by: Rudolf Walther-Fein
- Written by: Franz Rauch
- Starring: Hans Junkermann; Fritz Kampers; Maria Paudler
- Cinematography: Viktor Gluck; Edoardo Lamberti
- Production company: Aafa-Film
- Distributed by: Aafa-Film
- Release date: 8 November 1928
- Countries: Austria; Germany
- Languages: Silent; German intertitles

Marriage (German: Heiratsfieber) is a 1928 Austrian-German silent comedy film directed by Rudolf Walther-Fein and starring Hans Junkermann, Fritz Kampers and Maria Paudler.

Hans Ledersteger worked on designing the film's sets.

== Cast ==
- Hans Junkermann as Vincenz Jaromir, Graf von Staßwiedel
- Fritz Kampers as Seppl Häusinger
- Maria Paudler as Loni Miersbacher
- Vivian Gibson as Hedda Collani
- Franz Kammauf as Alois Loibner
- Hans Waldemar as Dr. Hüsing
- Otto Wögerer as Der Förster

== Bibliography ==
- Gerhard Lamprecht. Deutsche Stummfilme: 1927-1931.
