= A Girl with Temperament =

1928 film

- Directed by: Victor Janson
- Written by: Jane Bess; Joseph Than; Ludwig von Wohl (novel)
- Produced by: Fred Lyssa
- Starring: Maria Paudler; Eugen Neufeld; Luigi Serventi
- Cinematography: Giovanni Vitrotti
- Music by: Bernard Homola
- Production company: Erda-Film
- Distributed by: Deutsche Universal-Film
- Release date: 10 December 1928
- Running time: 76 minutes
- Country: Germany
- Languages: Silent; German intertitles

A Girl with Temperament (German: Ein Mädel mit Temperament) is a 1928 German silent comedy film directed by Victor Janson and starring Maria Paudler, Eugen Neufeld and Luigi Serventi. It was shot at the EFA Studios in Berlin. The film's art direction was by Otto Erdmann and Hans Sohnle.

== Cast ==
- Maria Paudler as Lillebil
- Eugen Neufeld as Tobias Budd, Lillebils Vater
- Luigi Serventi as Prinz Solm
- Paul Biensfeldt as Take Miliescu
- Grit Haid as Prinzessin Gaby
- Margot Landa as Rita
- Kurt Vespermann as Bela Körtecz
- Harry Gondi as Werner Straaten
- Dene Morel as Charlie Toddie
- Gertrud de Lalsky as Minchen Minding
- Ernst Udet as Kunstflieger - Himself

== Bibliography ==
- Alfred Krautz. International directory of cinematographers, set- and costume designers in film, Volume 4. Saur, 1984.
