= Robert and Bertram (1915 film) =

1915 film directed by Max Mack

- German: Robert und Bertram, die lustigen Vagabunden
- Directed by: Max Mack
- Written by: Gustav Räder (play); Johann Nestroy
- Starring: Eugen Burg; Ferdinand Bonn; Ernst Lubitsch
- Cinematography: Max Lutze
- Production company: PAGU
- Release date: 1915
- Running time: 46 minutes
- Country: Germany
- Languages: Silent; German intertitles

Robert and Bertram (German: Robert und Bertram, die lustigen Vagabunden) is a 1915 German silent comedy film directed by Max Mack and starring Eugen Burg, Ferdinand Bonn and Ernst Lubitsch. It is based on the 1856 Gustav Räder play Robert and Bertram about the adventures of two wandering vagrants, which has been turned into films on several occasions.

It was shot at the Tempelhof Studios in Berlin.

== Cast ==
- Eugen Burg as Robert
- Ferdinand Bonn as Bertram
- Wilhelm Diegelmann as Gefängniswärter
- Ernst Lubitsch as Kommis Max Edelstein

== Bibliography ==
- Bergfelder, Tim & Bock, Hans-Michael. The Concise Cinegraph: Encyclopedia of German. Berghahn Books, 2009.
- O'Brien, Mary-Elizabeth. Nazi Cinema as Enchantment: The Politics of Entertainment in the Third Reich. Camden House, 2004.
