= Eugen Thiele =

Austrian film director

- Born: Eugen Isersohn; 27 September 1897; Vienna, Austro-Hungarian Empire
- Died: 16 November 1938 (aged 41); Vienna, Nazi Austria
- Occupations: Director, screenwriter, actor
- Years active: 1927–1933 (film)

Eugen Thiele (1897–1938) was an Austrian film director and screenwriter. Of Jewish background he was the younger brother of Wilhelm Thiele. After a spell as an actor he established himself as a director in the Germany film industry of the early 1930s during the final years of the Weimar Republic. The Nazi seizure of power in 1933 brought an effective end to the career of the Jewish Thiele, who went into exile in Prague where he wrote the screenplay for one German-language film The Happiness of Grinzing, and may have also contributed to a German version of the Czech film Romance from the Tatra Mountains. He then returned to his native Austria, living in Baden bei Wien. He died the same year as the Anschluss which brought Austria under Nazi control.

== Selected filmography ==
- Susanne Cleans Up (1930)
- A Woman Branded (1931)
- My Heart Longs for Love (1931)
- Durand Versus Durand (1931)
- Three from the Unemployment Office (1932)
- Grandstand for General Staff (1932)
- The Happiness of Grinzing (1933)

== Bibliography ==
- Prawer, S.S. Between Two Worlds: The Jewish Presence in German and Austrian Film, 1910–1933. Berghahn Books, 2007.
- Waldman, Harry. Nazi Films in America, 1933–1942. McFarland, 2008.
