= Marianne Winkelstern =

German dancer and actress (1910–1966)

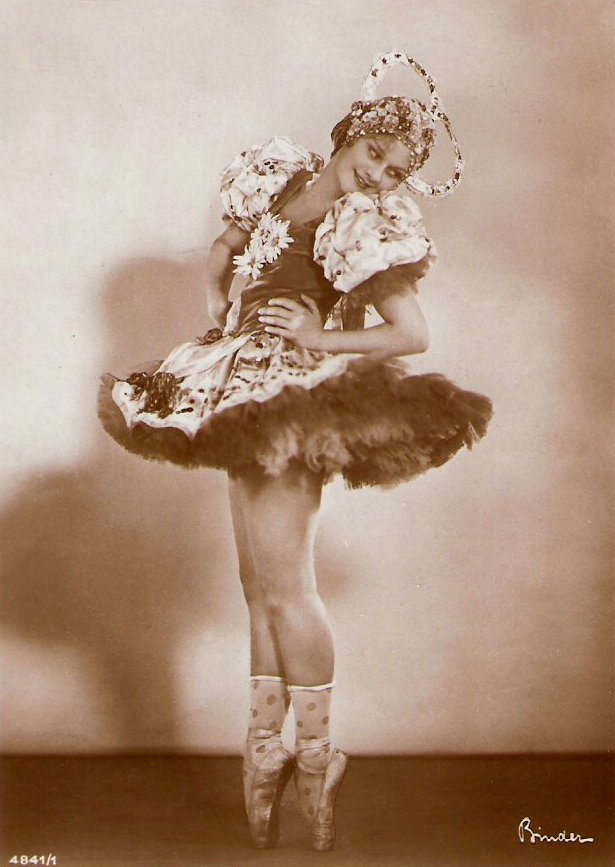
- Born: 1910; Berlin, German Empire
- Died: December 1966 (aged 55–56); London, United Kingdom
- Occupations: Actress, Dancer
- Years active: 1928-1934 (film )

Marianne Winkelstern (1910–1966) was a German dancer and actress. She retired and settled in Britain after marrying an Englishman.

== Selected filmography ==
- The Carnival Prince (1928)
- The Circus Princess (1929)
- The White Devil (1930)
- Waltz of Love (1930)
- The Big Attraction (1931)
- My Heart Longs for Love (1931)

== Bibliography ==
- Hardt, Ursula. From Caligari to California: Erich Pommer's Life in the International Film Wars. Berghahn Books, 1996.
