= The Corvette Captain =

1930 film

- Directed by: Rudolf Walther-Fein
- Written by: Franz Rauch
- Produced by: Gabriel Levy
- Starring: Harry Liedtke; Lia Eibenschütz; Maria Paudler
- Cinematography: Frederik Fuglsang; Edoardo Lamberti
- Edited by: Jean Oser
- Music by: Bronislaw Kaper
- Production company: Aafa Film
- Distributed by: Aafa Film
- Release date: 29 August 1930
- Running time: 100 minutes
- Country: Germany
- Language: German

The Corvette Captain (German: Der Korvettenkapitän) is a 1930 romantic comedy film directed by Rudolf Walther-Fein and starring Harry Liedtke, Lia Eibenschütz and Maria Paudler. It was shot at the Babelsberg and Tempelhof Studios and aboard a warship on the Dalmatian coast of the Adriatic Sea. The film's sets were designed by the art director Botho Höfer. Produced shortly after the conversion from silent to sound film, it was made by one of the leading independent studios Aafa Film. It is also known by the alternative title Blaue Jungs von der Marine.

== Synopsis ==
Korvettenkapitän Robert Norgard of the German Navy is sailing off the Dalmatian coast of Italy when he rescues the life of an Italian aristocrat. The latter is grateful and sees Norgard as a desirable son-in-law, and when the ship calls at its next port Ragusa he tries to set him up with his daughter Julia. Norgaard mysteriously swaps uniforms with his servant Peter, unaware that Julia has done likewise with her maid due to her indignation at her father offering her hand in marriage without her permission.

== Cast ==
- Harry Liedtke as Robert Norgard
- Lia Eibenschütz as Julia
- Hans Junkermann as Admiral von Castelli
- Maria Paudler as Anita
- Max Ehrlich as Emanuele di Cagliano
- Fritz Kampers as Peter
- Irene Krauß as Irene di Cagliano
- Franz Wallner as Franz

== Bibliography ==
- Jacobsen, Wolfgang. Babelsberg: ein Filmstudio 1912-1992. Argon, 1992
- Klaus, Ulrich J. Deutsche Tonfilme: Jahrgang 1929. Klaus-Archiv, 1988.
- Schöning, Jörg. Bewegte See: Maritimes Kino 1912-1957. Edition Text + Kritik, 2007.
- Waldman, Harry. Nazi Films in America, 1933-1942. McFarland, 2008.
