= Robert and Bertram (play) =

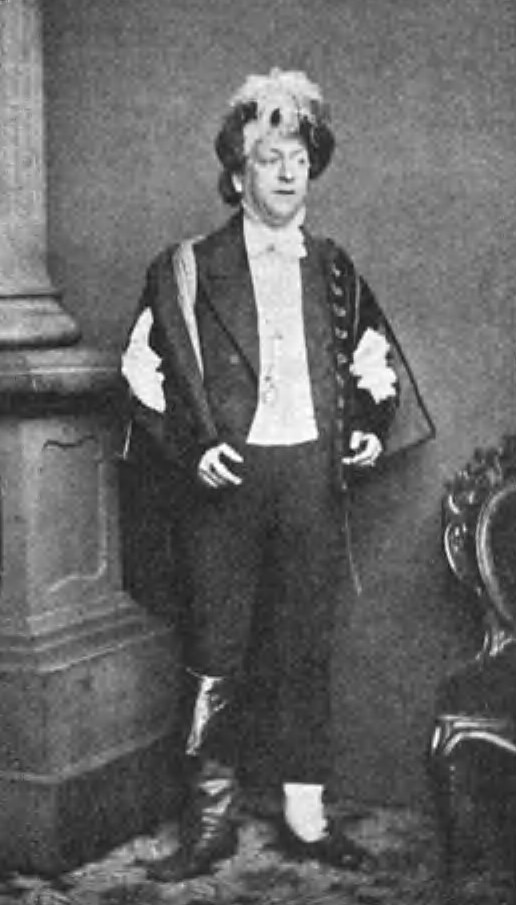
Actor Samuel Kapper in his role as Robert

Robert and Bertram (German: Robert und Bertram) is a comedy play by the German writer Gustav Räder, which was first staged in 1856. It depicts the adventures of two wandering vagrants. It premiered in Dresden on 6 February 1856. It served as the basis for a variety of different stage versions, loosely modelled on it. It was later turned into an 1888 opera Robert and Bertram.

== Adaptations ==
The play has been adapted into a number of films:

- Robert and Bertram (1915 film), a silent German film adaptation directed by Max Mack
- Robert and Bertram (1928 film), a silent German film adaptation directed by Rudolf Walther-Fein
- Robert and Bertram (1938 film), a Polish film adaptation directed by Mieczysław Krawicz
- Robert and Bertram (1939 film), a German film adaptation directed by Hans H. Zerlett
- Robert and Bertram (1961 film), a German film adaptation directed by Hans Deppe

== Bibliography ==
- O'Brien, Mary-Elizabeth (2006) [2004]. Nazi Cinema as Enchantment: The Politics of Entertainment in the Third Reich. Rochester, NY: Boydell & Brewer. ISBN 978-1-57113-334-2.
