= The Widow's Ball =

1930 film

- Film poster
- German: Der Witwenball
- Directed by: Georg Jacoby
- Written by: Friedrich Raff; Julius Urgiß
- Produced by: Seymour Nebenzal
- Starring: Lucie Englisch; Fritz Kampers; Sig Arno
- Cinematography: Friedl Behn-Grund
- Production company: Nero Film
- Distributed by: Vereinigte Star-Film
- Release date: 4 February 1930
- Country: Germany
- Language: German

The Widow's Ball (German: Der Witwenball) is a 1930 German comedy film directed by Georg Jacoby and starring Lucie Englisch, Fritz Kampers, and Sig Arno.

The film's sets were designed by the art director Franz Schroedter.

== Cast ==
- Lucie Englisch as Frieda
- Fritz Kampers as Fritz Petzold
- Peggy Norman as Lotte Petzold
- Sig Arno as Kiebitz
- Henry Bender as Herr Liesegang
- Lydia Potechina as Frau Liesegang
- Otto Wallburg as Teckelmann
- Herbert Paulmüller as Mann mit dem Mops
