= Danube Waltz (film) =

1930 German silent film

- Directed by: Victor Janson
- Written by: Walter Reisch
- Produced by: Gabriel Levy; Rudolf Walther-Fein
- Starring: Harry Liedtke; Harry Hardt; Adele Sandrock; Ferdinand Bonn
- Cinematography: Guido Seeber
- Production company: Aafa-Film
- Distributed by: Aafa-Film
- Release date: 16 January 1930
- Country: Germany
- Languages: Silent; German intertitles

Danube Waltz (German: Donauwalzer) is a 1930 German silent film directed by Victor Janson and starring Harry Liedtke, Harry Hardt, and Adele Sandrock. It was part of a group of nostalgic screenplays by Walter Reisch set in his native Austria.

== Cast ==
- Harry Liedtke
- Harry Hardt
- Adele Sandrock
- Paul Biensfeldt
- Ferdinand Bonn
- Peggy Norman
- Hermann Picha
- Ernő Verebes

== Bibliography ==
- Prawer, Siegbert Salomon (2005). Between Two Worlds: The Jewish Presence in German and Austrian Film, 1910–1933. New York: Berghahn Books. ISBN 978-1-84545-074-8.
