= Autumn on the Rhine =

1928 film

- Directed by: Siegfried Philippi
- Written by: Kurt Skalden
- Produced by: Gustav Althoff
- Starring: Albert Steinrück; Otto Reinwald; Julius Brandt
- Cinematography: Otto Tober
- Music by: Bernard Homola
- Production company: Albö-Film
- Distributed by: Albö-Film
- Release date: 18 April 1928
- Country: Germany
- Languages: Silent; German intertitles

Autumn on the Rhine (German: Herbstzeit am Rhein) is a 1928 German silent film directed by Siegfried Philippi and starring Albert Steinrück, Otto Reinwald and Julius Brandt.

The film's sets were designed by the art director Botho Hoefer.

== Cast ==
- Albert Steinrück as Kallborn, Wirt
- Otto Reinwald as Hannerl Kallborn
- Julius Brandt as Wiedebrecht, Weingutsbesitzer
- Egon von Jordan as Heinz Wiedebrecht
- Gritta Ley as Hella Boretius
- Leo Peukert as Bellingen, Justizrat
- Sophie Pagay as Brigitte, Haushälterin
- Ilka Grüning as Frau Holm
- Fritz Kampers as Peter Holm
- Hermann Picha as Tobias Rinke, Amtsdiener
- Max Mothes
- Grete Reinwald
- Grete Schmidt

== Bibliography ==
- Knop, Matthias (1995). Rote Rosen und weisser Flieder: die Blütezeit der Filmstadt. Museum Wiesbaden. ISBN 978-3-89258-028-7.
