= Fritz Kampers =

German actor (1891–1950)

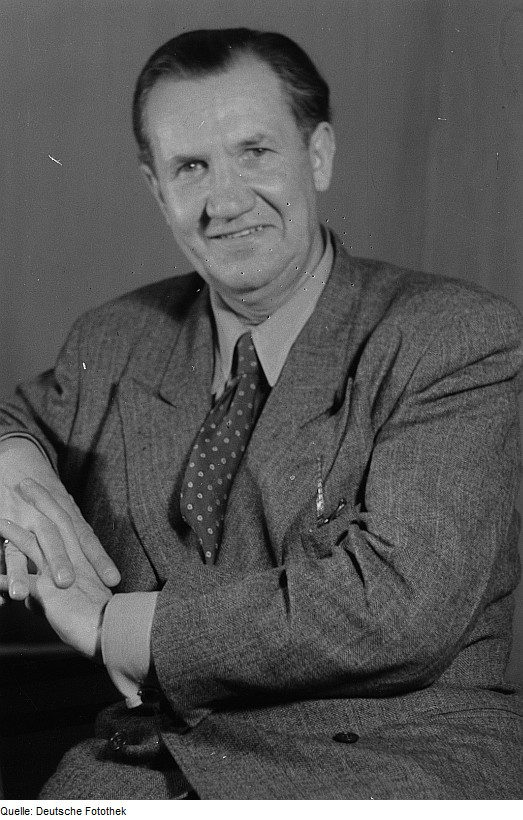
- Born: 14 July 1891; Munich, German Empire
- Died: 1 September 1950 (aged 59); Garmisch-Partenkirchen, Bavaria, West Germany
- Occupation: Actor
- Years active: 1913–1950

Fritz Kampers (14 July 1891 – 1 September 1950) was a German film actor. He appeared in more than 250 films between 1913 and 1950.

== Early life ==
Fritz Kampers was the son of a Munich hotel owner, spent his early childhood in Garmisch-Partenkirchen and attended a boarding school in Weilheim in Upper Bavaria. After completing secondary school, he completed a commercial apprenticeship in a textile shop in Munich and at the same time took acting classes with Richard Stury, who presided as president of the Munich experimental stage. After appearances at small suburbs in Munich, such as the Alhambratheater, he wandered through the province and finally found engagements in Alzey, Karlsruhe, Lucerne, Sondershausen, Helmstedt and Aachen. During the First World War he served as a cavalryman on the Eastern Front, was wounded, fired and joined the front theaters in Warsaw and Łódź.

During a commitment begun in 1917 at the Munich Volkstheater, Fritz Kampers got to know the director Franz Seitz, who gave him some film engagements. Even as a film director, he appeared between 1917 and 1920 in appearance. In The Volkstyrann played under his direction the famous colleague Albert Steinrück the main role. In 1920 he went to Berlin, where he worked for a year as a villain for Gustav Althoff's film company and at the same time on stages such as the Kleinen Schauspielhaus, the Lessingtheater, the German Theater and the Revue Theater "Admiralspalast" occurred. Kampers also became popular as a cabaret artist; For a time he was part of the ensemble of Trude Hesterberg's political-literary cabaret "Die Wilde Bühne".

In the mid-1920s, Fritz Kampers changed roles and played as comic character actor pithy originals and neat soldiers and officers, often with Bavarian influence. The likeable of these guys, whom he successfully portrayed until the end of his film career, was the apparent antagonism of primordial robustness and bluntness on the one hand - Kampers' gestures were thrifty, his short sentences dry and almost deliberate - and wit, cunning, and unexpected depth on the other hand.

The change to the sound film fell to Fritz Kampers easily. He had great roles in Max Obal's comedy "The Merry Musicians" (1930), in GW Pabst's films "West Front 1918" (1930) and "Comradeship" (1931), in "Three of the Stamp" (1932) and "Two Good Comrades "(1933). When many film artists went abroad in 1933 because of the Nazi entry into the government and the film industry was desperately looking for a suitable replacement, Kampers, who occasionally also directed in the period after the First World War, was given the opportunity to stage two of his own films: the Schwank "Konjunkturritter" (1933/34, with White Ferdl and Sabine Peters) and the confusion comedy "I sing 'into my heart" (1934, with Lien Deyers and Hans Söhnker).

His acting career continued under the regime of National Socialism. From 1934 he was part of the ensemble of the Berlin Volksbühne and he also continued to appear in films - including in Nazi propaganda films such as "Three Emperor Hunters" (1933), "The Four Musketeers" (1934), "Holiday on Honor" (1937), "In the Name of the People" (1939), "Robert and Bertram" (1939), "The Fire Devil" (1940), "About Everything in the World" and "Attack on Baku" (1941). Although Kampers was appointed a state actor by Joseph Goebbels in 1939, by 1942 he seems to have been rejected from film offers in propaganda films.

In the post-war period, Kampers soon found employment with supporting roles in films like "Sensation in Savoy" and "Schwarzwaldmädel" (1950). He was one of the most active actors in German film. Between 1918 and 1950 he was involved in more than 260 films, that is every 17th film produced during this period. His resting place is on the Evangelical Cemetery in Neubeckum.

== Selected filmography ==
- The War of the Oxen (1920)
- Lola Montez, the King's Dancer (1922)
- Yellow Star (1922)
- The Circle of Death (1922)
- Shame (1922)
- Monna Vanna (1922)
- The Stone Rider (1923)
- Man by the Wayside (1923)
- William Tell (1923)
- Arabella (1924)
- The Path to God (1924)
- Nanon (1924)
- Lord Reginald's Derby Ride (1924)
- The Voice of the Heart (1924)
- Wallenstein (1925)
- People of the Sea (1925)
- Curfew (1925)
- Reveille: The Great Awakening (1925)
- Semi-Silk (1925)
- In the Valleys of the Southern Rhine (1925)
- Comedians (1925)
- Goetz von Berlichingen of the Iron Hand (1925)
- The Man Without Sleep (1926)
- The Circus of Life (1926)
- Our Daily Bread (1926)
- Nanette Makes Everything (1926)
- The Mill at Sanssouci (1926)
- We'll Meet Again in the Heimat (1926)
- Give My Regards to the Blonde Child on the Rhine (1926)
- Marriage Announcement (1926)
- The Uncle from the Provinces (1926)
- Tea Time in the Ackerstrasse (1926)
- The Hunter of Fall (1926)
- The Captain from Koepenick (1926)
- The Priest from Kirchfeld (1926)
- The Prince and the Dancer (1926)
- Superfluous People (1926)
- The Pride of the Company (1926)
- We Belong to the Imperial-Royal Infantry Regiment (1926)
- Radio Magic (1927)
- Forbidden Love (1927)
- The Curse of Vererbung (1927)
- A Serious Case (1927)
- German Women - German Faithfulness (1927)
- The Pink Slippers (1927)
- Weekend Magic (1927)
- A Girl of the People (1927)
- His Late Excellency (1927)
- The Imaginary Baron (1927)
- The Lady with the Mask (1928)
- Mariett Dances Today (1928)
- It Attracted Three Fellows (1928)
- Marriage (1928)
- The House Without Men (1928)
- Under Suspicion (1928)
- Robert and Bertram (1928)
- Sir or Madam (1928)
- Almenrausch and Edelweiss (1928)
- The Page Boy at the Golden Lion (1928)
- A Better Master (1928)
- Lemke's Widow (1928)
- Darling of the Dragoons (1928)
- The Lady and the Chauffeur (1928)
- The Women's War (1928)
- Miss Chauffeur (1928)
- Autumn on the Rhine (1928)
- Mary Lou (1928)
- The Mistress and her Servant (1929)
- The Right of the Unborn (1929)
- The Woman Everyone Loves Is You (1929)
- Foolish Happiness (1929)
- Tragedy of Youth (1929)
- Tempo! Tempo! (1929)
- Marriage in Trouble (1929)
- The Circus Princess (1929)
- Katharina Knie (1929)
- Somnambul (1929)
- Gentlemen Among Themselves (1929)
- Kohlhiesel's Daughters (1930)
- Westfront 1918 (1930)
- The Widow's Ball (1930)
- The Corvette Captain (1930)
- Rag Ball (1930)
- The Three from the Filling Station (1930)
- Pension Schöller (1930)
- Dreyfus (1930)
- Die Bräutigamswitwe (1931)
- Shooting Festival in Schilda (1931)
- Gloria (1931)
- Schubert's Dream of Spring (1931)
- Peace of Mind (1931)
- Kameradschaft (1931)
- The Blue of Heaven (1932)
- Spoiling the Game (1932)
- Mrs. Lehmann's Daughters (1932)
- The Rebel (1932)
- The Pride of Company Three (1932)
- Scandal on Park Street (1932)
- Three from the Unemployment Office (1932)
- The Heath Is Green (1932)
- Three Bluejackets and a Blonde (1933)
- The Judas of Tyrol (1933)
- The Hunter from Kurpfalz (1933)
- Manolescu, Prince of Thieves (1933)
- A City Upside Down (1933)
- Honour Among Thieves (1933)
- The Master Detective (1933)
- A Woman Like You (1933)
- Two Good Comrades (1933)
- The Emperor's Waltz (1933)
- Little Man, What Now? (1933)
- The Double Fiance (1934)
- Financial Opportunists (1934)
- The Sun Rises (1934)
- Love and the First Railway (1934)
- The Four Musketeers (1934)
- The Gypsy Baron (1935)
- City of Anatol (1936)
- Martha (1936)
- The Three Around Christine (1936)
- The Violet of Potsdamer Platz (1936)
- The Beggar Student (1936)
- White Slaves (1937)
- Meiseken (1937)
- Pour Le Mérite (1938)
- Northern Lights (1938)
- Legion Condor (1939)
- The Golden Mask (1939)
- The Scoundrel (1939)
- In the Name of the People (1939)
- Robert and Bertram (1939)
- Ursula Under Suspicion (1939)
- The Girl from Barnhelm (1940)
- The Fire Devil (1940)
- Left of the Isar, Right of the Spree (1940)
- Above All Else in the World (1941)
- Attack on Baku (1942)
- Bravo Acrobat! (1943)
- Kohlhiesel's Daughters (1943)
- Gabriele Dambrone (1943)
- The War of the Oxen (1943)
- The Second Shot (1943)
- The Master Detective (1944)
- Marriage of Affection (1944)
- Peter Voss, Thief of Millions (1946)
- Everything Will Be Better in the Morning (1948)
- Nothing But Coincidence (1949)
- I'll Make You Happy (1949)
- Friday the Thirteenth (1949)
- Abundance of Life (1950)
