= Delicatessen (1930 film) =

1930 film directed by Géza von Bolváry

- Directed by: Géza von Bolváry
- Written by: Franz Schulz
- Starring: Harry Liedtke; Georgia Lind; Ernő Verebes
- Cinematography: Willy Goldberger
- Music by: Pasquale Perris
- Production company: Deutsche Lichtspiel-Syndikat
- Distributed by: Deutsche Lichtspiel-Syndikat
- Release date: 5 March 1930
- Running time: 82 minutes
- Country: Germany
- Language: German

Delicatessen (German: Delikatessen) is a 1930 German romance film directed by Géza von Bolváry and starring Harry Liedtke, Georgia Lind, and Ernő Verebes. It was shot at the Tempelhof Studios in Berlin. The film's sets were designed by the art director Robert Neppach. This was Liedtke's talkie debut.

== Plot ==
Franz Hellmer is the manager of Paul Wallis' delicatessen, and his friend Bela works there as a clerk. When the friends meet Lilo Martens, both are very taken with the pretty young woman. It quickly turns out, however, that Bela cannot score with Lilo, while the charming Franz thinks he has a chance. After partying with friends at the "Green Cockatoo" and cheering the performance of the singer Dolly Reves, and closing the place because of the police hour, the friends decide to continue the fun get-together in the deli. However, their noisy party leads to neighbors calling the police. As a result, Franz and Bela lose their jobs.

However, the friends quickly find new jobs with Mr. Markow, whose delicatessen is across the street. Markov expects something from this, since Franz is particularly popular with female customers because of his charming nature. Wallis, in turn, finds a new employee in Lilo. In fact, Markow was right with his decision, because the friends ensure that the delicatessen grows into serious competition for the Wallis delicatessen within a short time. However, this competition for customers means losses for both businesses in the long run, so that the owners ultimately follow Franz's suggestion and combine their businesses. And that leads to another lucky circumstance for Franz, because he finally gets his Lilo.

== Cast ==
- Harry Liedtke as Franz Hellmer
- Georgia Lind as Dolly Reeves
- Ernő Verebes
- Gustl Gstettenbaur as Lehrling
- Hans Junkermann as Paul Wallis
- Ernst Senesch as J. E. Markow
- Danièle Parola as Lilo Martens
- Paul Hörbiger as Josef, Wallis's servant
- Willy Prager as lecturer
- Jo-Hai Tong as cabaret performer
- Antonie Jaeckel as cashier
