= Harry Liedtke =

German actor (1882–1945)

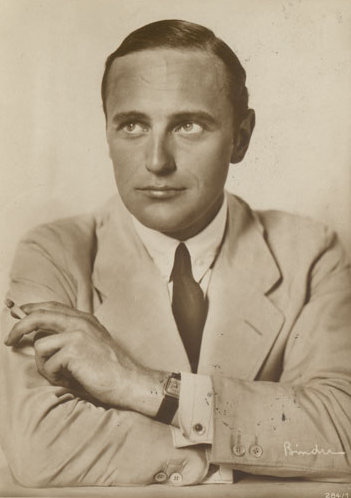
- Born: 12 October 1882; Königsberg, East Prussia, German Empire
- Died: 28 April 1945 (aged 62); Bad Saarow-Pieskow, Nazi Germany
- Occupation: Actor
- Years active: 1908–1944
- Spouses: Ernestine Emaline Johanne Proft (m. 1907; div. 1916) Käthe Dorsch (m. 1920; div. 1928) Christa Tordy (m. 1928)
- Children: 1

Harry Liedtke (12 October 1882 – 28 April 1945) was a German film actor.

== Early life ==
Liedtke was born in Königsberg, East Prussia as the seventh out of 12 children of a merchant. After his father's death in 1896, he grew up in an orphanage and began a qualification in retail business. By the chance acquaintance of Hans Oberländer, a stage director at Berlin, he started to take stage classes and was first engaged at the municipal Theater of Freiberg, Saxony. In 1908 Liedtke worked at the New German Theatre in New York City and in 1909 at the Deutsches Theater Berlin.

== Career ==
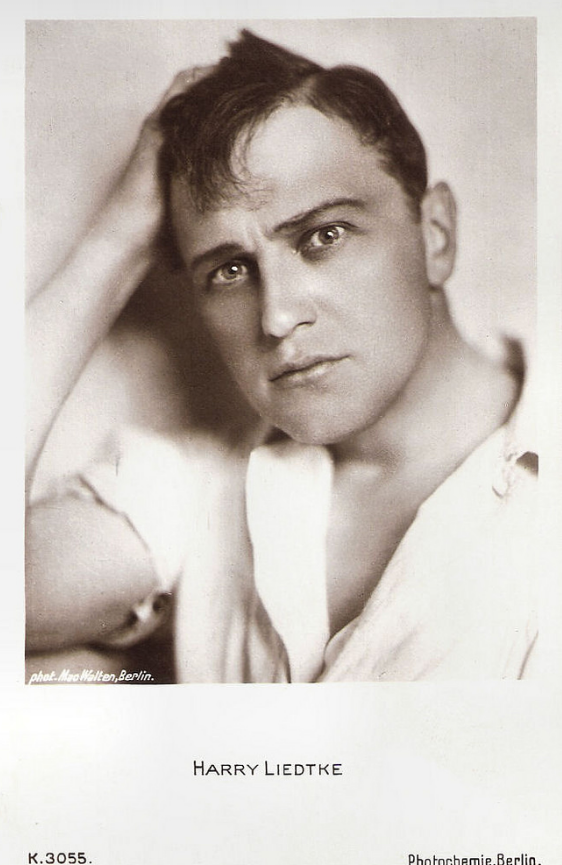
Liedtke, c. 1910s

In 1912 Liedtke appeared for the first time in the silent movie Zu spät and from then onwards usually as a young "Charming Boy" and gentleman. With Ernst Lubitsch he made movies like Das fidele Gefängnis (1917), Die Augen der Mumie Ma (1918), Carmen (1918), Die Austernprinzessin (1919), Madame Dubarry (1919), Sumurun (1920) and Das Weib des Pharao (1921). He also appeared in several crime stories as Stuart Webbs or Joe Deebs written by Joe May. Liedtke was a popular actor in the 1920s and partner of Marlene Dietrich in I Kiss Your Hand, Madame (1929). Liedtke met with less success in sound films, probably due to his advancing age.

Liedtke's first marriage was to Ernestine Emaline Johanne Proft, also known as Hanne Schutt. The two had one child together before divorcing in 1916. From 1920 to 1928, Liedtke was married to the actress Käthe Dorsch. Shortly after their divorce, he married actress Christa Tordy on 27 March 1928.

== Death ==
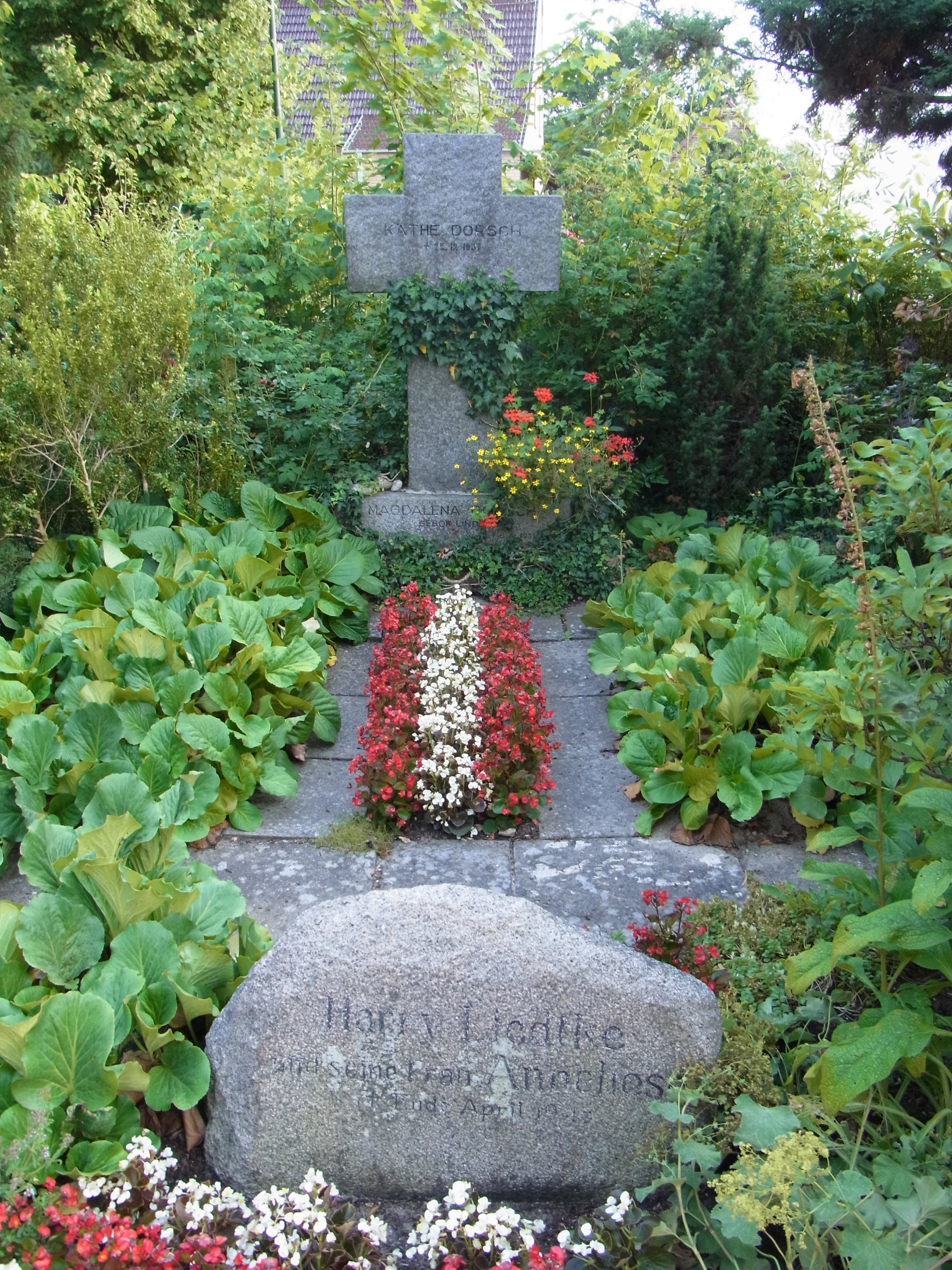
Grave of Harry Liedtke and his spouses Käthe Dorsch and Christa Tordy in Pieskow, Bad Saarow

On 28 April 1945 Liedtke was murdered by Red Army soldiers in his house at Bad Saarow-Pieskow east of Berlin together with his wife Christa Tordy. While attempting to save Tordy from being raped and murdered, he died after either being smashed on the head with a beer bottle, or after being clubbed to death. Prior to their murder, the couple had attempted suicide.

Tordy and Liedtke's bodies were exhumed in October 1948 and buried at Waldfriedhof Saarow-Pieskow Cemetery. Upon Liedtke's ex-wife Käthe Dorsch's death in 1957, she was buried alongside the two.

== Filmography ==
- Zu spät (1912)
- Der wankende Glaube (1913)
- Eva (1913)
- Schuldig (1913)
- Die Tat von damals (1915)
- Der Krieg brachte Frieden (1915)
- Das rätselhafte Inserat (1916)
- Leutnant auf Befehl (1916)
- Wie ich Detektiv wurde (1916)
- Der Amateur (1916)
- Arme Eva Maria (1916)
- Das Bild der Ahnfrau (1916)
- Die bleiche Renate (1916)
- Das fidele Gefängnis (1917)
- Das Geheimnis der leeren Wasserflasche (1917)
- The Ring of Giuditta Foscari (1917)
- Wedding in the Eccentric Club (1917)
- Lulu (1917)
- Sleeping Beauty (1917)
- Die Kameliendame (Prima Vera) (1917)
- The Flyer from Goerz (1918)
- The Sacrifice (1918)
- The Toboggan Cavalier (1918)
- Die blaue Mauritius (1918)
- The Mystery of Bangalore (1918)
- Carmen (1918)
- The Ballet Girl (1918)
- Der gelbe Schein (1918)
- The Eyes of the Mummy Ma (1918)
- Countess Doddy (1919)
- Madame Dubarry (1919)
- Vendetta (1919)
- Die Tochter des Mehemed (1919)
- The Woman at the Crossroads (1919)
- The Oyster Princess (1919)
- Moral und Sinnlichkeit (1919)
- Irrungen (1919)
- Rebellenliebe (1919)
- Retter der Menschheit (1919)
- Der Tempelräuber (1919)
- The Carousel of Life (1919)
- Sumurun (1920)
- The Prisoner (1920)
- Das einsame Wrack (1920)
- Indian Revenge (1920)
- The Dancer Barberina (1920)
- What a Girl (1920)
- The Sins of the Mother (1921)
- Peter Voss, Thief of Millions (1921, 6 parts)
- Mein Mann - Der Nachtredakteur (1921)
- The Loves of Pharaoh (1922)
- The Last Payment (1922)
- The Merchant of Venice (1923)
- Die Fledermaus (1923)
- The Love of a Queen (1923)
- The Little Napoleon (1923)
- Der Seeteufel (1923, 2 parts)
- Orient (1924)
- Ein Traum vom Glück (1924)
- Nanon (1924)
- The Grand Duke's Finances (1924)
- A Woman for 24 Hours (1925)
- Countess Maritza (1925)
- Love and Trumpets (1925)
- Um Recht und Ehre (1925)
- The Island of Dreams (1925)
- The Doll Queen (1925)
- Madame Wants No Children (1926)
- Fadette (1926)
- The World Wants To Be Deceived (1926)
- Grandstand for General Staff (1926)
- The Girl on a Swing (1926)
- The Woman's Crusade (1926)
- The Violet Eater (1926)
- The Blue Danube (1926)
- The Wiskottens (1926)
- The Bohemian Dancer (1926)
- The Adventurers (1926)
- The Man Without Sleep (1926)
- Nixchen (1926)
- A Girl of the People (1927)
- Weekend Magic (1927)
- The Fate of a Night (1927)
- Ein Mädel aus dem Volke (1927)
- The Spinning Ball (1927)
- The Marriage Nest (1927)
- The Prince's Child (1927)
- Regine (1927)
- The Queen Was in the Parlour (1927)
- Durchlaucht Radieschen (1927)
- Marie's Soldier (1927)
- The Mistress (1927)
- Carnival Magic (1927)
- A Crazy Night (1927)
- Chance the Idol (1927)
- The Beggar Student (1927)
- Der Herzensphotograph (1928)
- The Carnival Prince (1928)
- A Modern Casanova (1928)
- The Game of Love (1928)
- Robert and Bertram (1928)
- Love on Skis (1928)
- Darling of the Dragoons (1928)
- Mein Freund Harry (1928)
- Queen of Fashion (1929)
- Father and Son (1929)
- The Black Domino (1929)
- Youth of the Big City (1929)
- The Merry Widower (1929)
- The Hero of Every Girl's Dream (1929)
- The Circus Princess (1929)
- I Kiss Your Hand, Madame (1929)
- My Daughter's Tutor (1929)
- Josef the Chaste (1930)
- The Corvette Captain (1930)
- O Mädchen, mein Mädchen, wie lieb' ich Dich! (1930)
- Delicatessen (1930)
- Danube Waltz (1930)
- The Great Longing (1930)
- No More Love (1931)
- Der Liebesarzt (1931)
- That's All That Matters (1931)
- Liebe in Uniform (1932)
- The Page from the Dalmasse Hotel (1933)
- When the Village Music Plays on Sunday Nights (1933)
- Between Two Hearts (1934)
- Liebesleute (1935)
- City of Anatol (1936)
- Dangerous Game (1937)
- Preußische Liebesgeschichte (1938)
- Es Leuchten die Sterne (1938)
- Quax the Crash Pilot (1941)
- The Master of the Estate (1943)
- Sophienlund (1943)
- Das Konzert (1944)
