= Maria Paudler =

German actress (1903-1990)

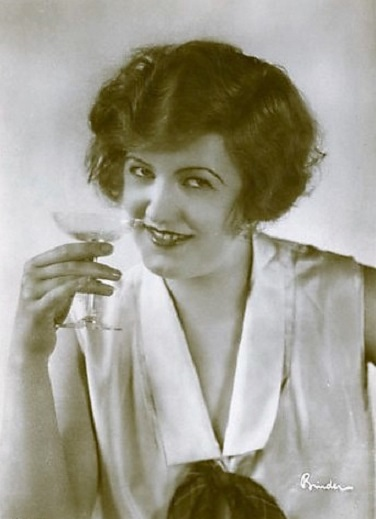
Maria Paudler in 1928.

Maria Paudler (20 June 1903 – 17 August 1990) was an Austro-Hungarian-born German actress.

== Selected filmography ==
- Madame Wants No Children (1926)
- The Young Man from the Ragtrade (1926)
- The Violet Eater (1926)
- One Does Not Play with Love (1926)
- Weekend Magic (1927)
- The White Spider (1927)
- The Beggar Student (1927)
- Orient Express (1927)
- The Lorelei (1927)
- The Indiscreet Woman (1927)
- Mein Freund Harry (1928)
- The Abduction of the Sabine Women (1928)
- A Girl with Temperament (1928)
- Darling of the Dragoons (1928)
- Marriage (1928)
- The Last Fort (1929)
- Love in the Snow (1929)
- Foolish Happiness (1929)
- Gentlemen Among Themselves (1929)
- Youth of the Big City (1929)
- Marriage Strike (1930)
- The Great Longing (1930)
- The Corvette Captain (1930)
- Two Worlds (1930)
- Johann Strauss (1931)
- The Wrong Husband (1931)
- When the Village Music Plays on Sunday Nights (1933)
- The Young Baron Neuhaus (1934)
- Immortal Melodies (1935)
- Professor Nachtfalter (1951)
- Once on the Rhine (1952)
- Not Afraid of Big Animals (1953)
- A Love Story (1954)
