= Bernard Homola =

German composer (1894–1975)

Bernard Homola (26 October 1894 – 13 June 1975) was a German film score composer.

== Selected filmography ==
- Strauss Is Playing Today (1928)
- The Carousel of Death (1928)
- The Lady from Argentina (1928)
- Autumn on the Rhine (1928)
- A Girl with Temperament (1928)
- A Modern Casonova (1928)
- Tempo! Tempo! (1929)
- The Youths (1929)
- I Lost My Heart on a Bus (1929)
- Hungarian Nights (1929)
- Dawn (1929)
- The Citadel of Warsaw (1930)
- Rag Ball (1930)
- Flachsmann the Educator (1930)
- Täter gesucht (1931)

== Bibliography ==
- Jung, Uli & Schatzberg, Walter. Beyond Caligari: The Films of Robert Wiene. Berghahn Books, 1999.
