= Marriage Strike (1930 film) =

1930 film directed by Carl Boese

- German: Ehestreik
- Directed by: Carl Boese
- Written by: Gernot Bock-Stieber; Paul Schiller
- Starring: Livio Pavanelli; Maria Paudler; Georg Alexander
- Cinematography: Akos Farkas
- Production companies: Filmproduktion Loew & Co.
- Release date: 20 March 1930
- Running time: 90 minutes
- Country: Germany
- Languages: Silent; German intertitles

Marriage Strike (German: Ehestreik) is a 1930 German silent comedy film directed by Carl Boese and starring Livio Pavanelli, Maria Paudler and Georg Alexander. The film's sets were designed by the art director August Rinaldi. It was made at the tail-end of silent film production, as sound film was rapidly taking over.

== Cast ==
- Livio Pavanelli as Doctor Fritz Denk
- Maria Paudler as Mary
- Georg Alexander as Doctor Edgar Hupp
- Julius Falkenstein as Professor Haberling
- Hanni Weisse as Lucy
- Gerhard Dammann
