= Edoardo Lamberti =

Italian cinematographer

- Born: 31 March 1895; Turin, Piedmont; Italy
- Died: 1968 (aged 72–73); Rome, Lazio; Italy
- Occupation: Cinematographer
- Years active: 1921-1957 (film)

Edoardo Lamberti (1895–1968) was an Italian cinematographer. During the 1920s he worked in Weimar Germany, but later returned to Italy.

== Selected filmography ==
- Mister Radio (1924)
- The Game of Love (1924)
- By Order of Pompadour (1924)
- Hunted People (1926)
- The Beggar Student (1927)
- Rinaldo Rinaldini (1927)
- Weekend Magic (1927)
- Darling of the Dragoons (1928)
- The Insurmountable (1928)
- Marriage (1928)
- The Criminal of the Century (1928)
- Youth of the Big City (1929)
- Tempo! Tempo! (1929)
- The Black Domino (1929)
- Foolish Happiness (1929)
- Hungarian Nights (1929)
- Gentlemen Among Themselves (1929)
- The Corvette Captain (1930)
- The Black Panther (1942)
- Two Hearts (1943)
- Return to Naples (1949)

== Bibliography ==
- Stewart, John. Italian Film: A Who's Who, McFarland, 1994.
