= Guido Seeber =

German cinematographer

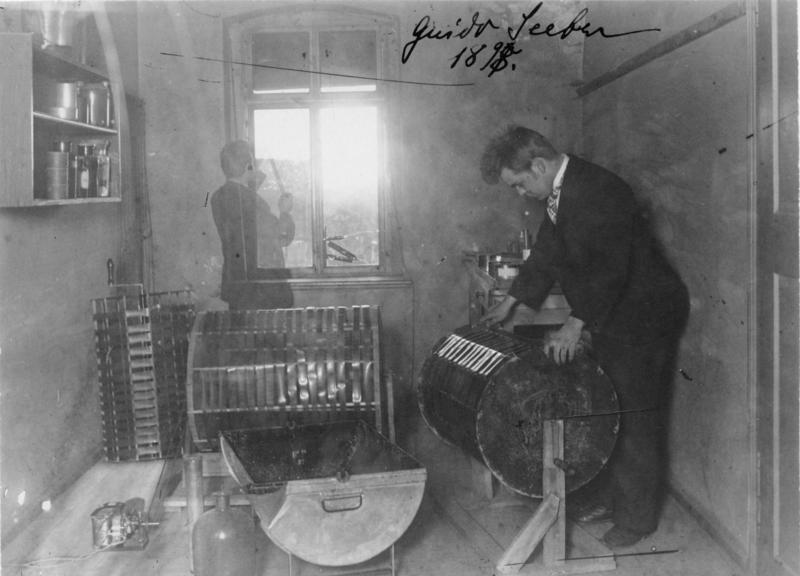
Guido Seeber.

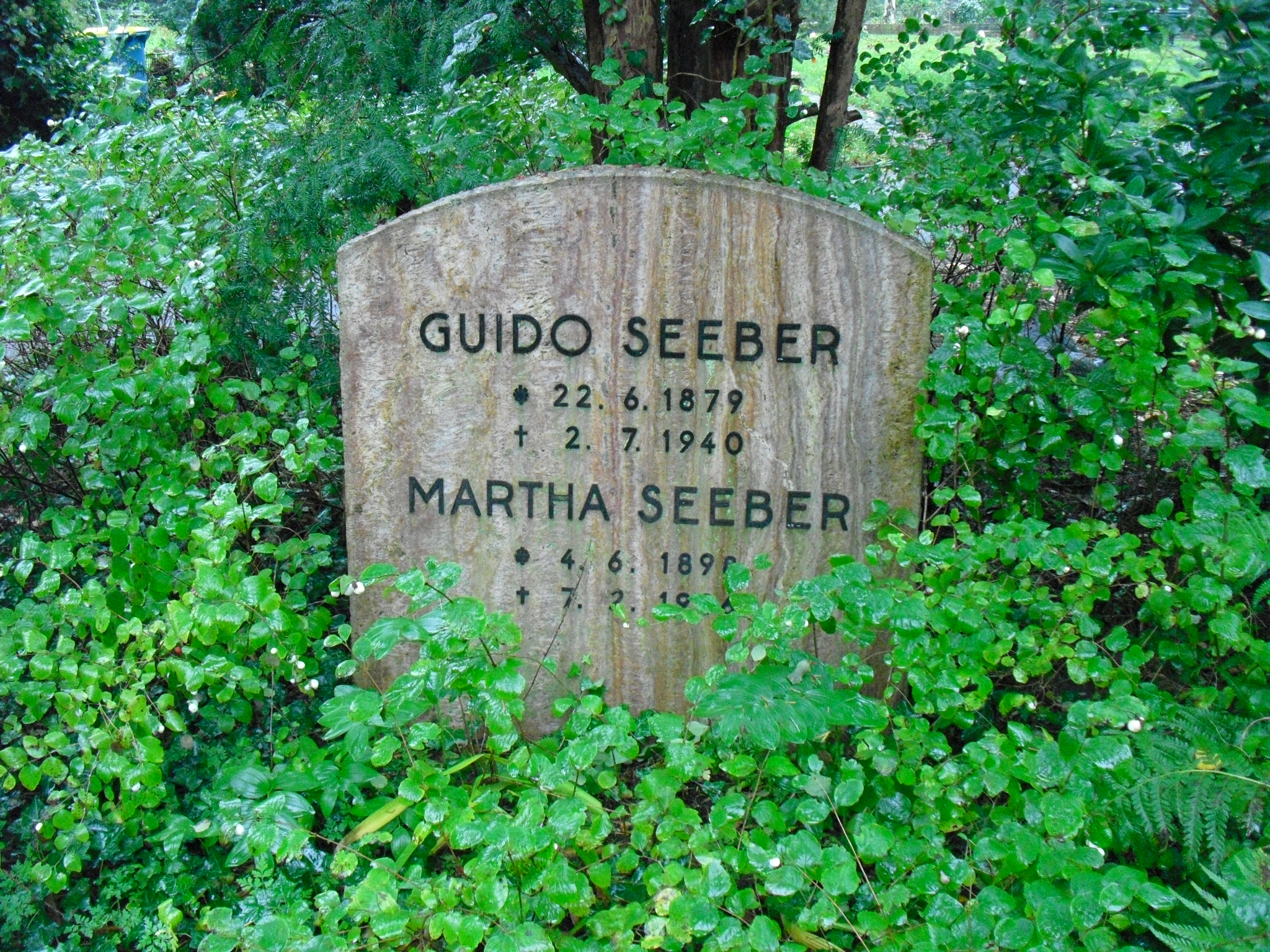
Grave of Guido Seeber in Friedhof Heerstraße, Berlin-Westend

Guido Seeber (22 June 1879 in Chemnitz – 2 July 1940 in Berlin) was a German cinematographer and pioneer of early cinema.

Seeber's father, Clemens, was a photographer and therefore Seeber had experience with photography from an early age. In the summer of 1896, he saw the first films of the Lumière Brothers and became fascinated by this new technology. He bought a film camera and devoted himself to the development of cinematography and of sound films.

In 1908 he became technical manager of the film company Deutsche Bioscop and in 1909 directed his first film. His pioneering work as a cinematographer from this time on laid the foundations which other cameramen of German silent film such as Karl Freund, Fritz Arno Wagner and Carl Hoffmann were able to build.

In addition to his technical talents with the camera (he developed several special effects techniques), his use of perspective and skillful contrasts between light and dark are noteworthy. His main collaborators were the directors Urban Gad, Lupu Pick, Georg Wilhelm Pabst und Paul Wegener and among his most important accomplishments are the shots of the Doppelgänger in Wegener's Der Student von Prag (The Student of Prague) of 1913 and the moving camera shots in the films of Lupu Pick, particularly Sylvester (1923), which can be seen as anticipating the so-called "unchained camera" of Friedrich Wilhelm Murnau's The Last Laugh (1924).

Seeber created several animated works, including an advertisement entitle Kipho or Du musst zur Kipho (You Must Go to Kino-Photo) for a film and photography exhibition in Berlin in 1925.

Seeber continued to work into the sound era, but his work from this period is less significant. He had suffered a stroke in 1932 and after this he largely retired from active camera operation. However, he continued to be involved in the film industry, taking over the management of UFA's animation department in 1935 and publishing several books for amateur filmmakers.

== Selected filmography ==
- The Traitress (1911)
- Die Augen des Ole Brandis (1913)
- The Wandering Image (1920)
- Impostor (1921)
- Fridericus Rex (1922)
- Old Heidelberg (1923)
- William Tell (1923)
- Adam and Eve (1923)
- The Hobgoblin (1924)
- Countess Donelli (1924)
- Garragan (1924)
- Wood Love (1925)
- In the Valleys of the Southern Rhine (1925)
- Living Buddhas (1925)
- Secrets of a Soul (1926)
- A Girl of the People (1927)
- Rhenish Girls and Rhenish Wine (1927)
- Weekend Magic (1927)
- Circle of Lovers (1927)
- Robert and Bertram (1928)
- Darling of the Dragoons (1928)
- Give Me Life (1928)
- The Insurmountable (1928)
- Youth of the Big City (1929)
- Gentlemen Among Themselves (1929)
- The Black Domino (1929)
- Tempo! Tempo! (1929)
- Queen of Fashion (1929)
- Hungarian Nights (1929)
- Foolish Happiness (1929)
- Danube Waltz (1930)
- Storm in a Water Glass (1931)
- The Woman They Talk About (1931)
- My Heart Longs for Love (1931)
- The Beggar Student (1931)
- Peace of Mind (1931)
- Three from the Unemployment Office (1932)
- Distorting at the Resort (1932)
- Two Lucky Days (1932)
- Two Good Comrades (1933)
- A Woman With Power of Attorney (1934)
- Don't Lose Heart, Suzanne! (1935)

== Sources ==
- Herbst, Helmut. Drei Bildbeschreibungen und eine Liste. Der Filmpionier Guido Seeber. pp. 15–41 in C. Müller und H. Segeberg (ed.) Die Modellierung des Kinofilms. Munich, 1998.
- Stiftung Deutsche Kinemathek (publ.) Das wandernde Bild. Der Filmpionier Guido Seeber. Berlin, 1979.
- Castan, Joachim. Max Skladanowsky oder der Beginn einer deutschen Filmgeschichte., Stuttgart, 1995. ISBN 3-9803451-3-0. Highly interesting the relationship between Skladanowsky and Seeber.
