= Rudolf Walther-Fein =

Austrian film director and producer

Rudolf Walther-Fein (20 November 1875 – 1 May 1933) was an Austrian film director and producer of the silent and early sound era. He directed the first full sound film to be released in Germany It's You I Have Loved in 1929.

== Selected filmography ==
- Only One Night (1922)
- The Big Thief (1922)
- Bigamy (1922)
- William Tell (co-director: Rudolf Dworsky, 1923)
- The Treasure of Gesine Jacobsen (1923)
- The Little Duke (1924)
- In the Valleys of the Southern Rhine (co-director: Rudolf Dworsky, 1925)
- Lightning (1925)
- The Adventurers (1926)
- The Laughing Husband (co-director: Rudolf Dworsky, 1926)
- Kissing Is No Sin (co-director: Rudolf Dworsky, 1926)
- Vienna, How it Cries and Laughs (co-director: Rudolf Dworsky, 1926)
- The Fallen (co-director: Rudolf Dworsky, 1926)
- Weekend Magic (1927)
- Circle of Lovers (co-director: Rudolf Dworsky, 1927)
- Carnival Magic (co-director: Rudolf Dworsky, 1927)
- Darling of the Dragoons (1928)
- Robert and Bertram (1928)
- Marriage (1928)
- The Carnival Prince (1928)
- Youth of the Big City (1929)
- Foolish Happiness (1929)
- The Black Domino (1929)
- It's You I Have Loved (1929)
- Hungarian Nights (1929)
- Queen of Fashion (1929)
- Gentlemen Among Themselves (1929)
- Danube Waltz (1930)
- The Corvette Captain (1930)
- The Fate of Renate Langen (1931)
- My Heart Longs for Love (1931)
- For Once I'd Like to Have No Troubles (1932)
- Two Lucky Days (1932)
- Theodor Körner (1932)

== Bibliography ==
- Kreimeier, Klaus. The Ufa story: a history of Germany's greatest film company, 1918-1945. University of California Press, 1999.
