= Hans Minzloff =

German art director (1890–1962)

- Born: 16 February 1890; Berlin, German Empire
- Died: 19 September 1962 (aged 72); Berlin, Germany
- Occupation: Art Director
- Years active: 1925-1958 (film )

Hans Minzloff (1890–1962) was a German art director.

== His life ==
The son of sculptor Viktor Minzloff, he trained as a theater painter and briefly studied architecture at the Technische Hochschule in Charlottenburg (now Technische Universität Berlin). Minzloff, who had been active in film since 1918, gained practical experience with the set designer and film architect Ernst Stern. In 1921, for example, he designed several Egyptian sets for Ernst Lubitsch's monumental drama The Pharaoh's Wife and was also involved in Lubitsch's last German production, The Flame.

In 1924, Hans Minzloff was promoted to chief architect at the cultural department of the UFA. His task was to realize the designs of established colleagues such as Botho Höfer, Walter Reimann and Carl Stahl-Urach. In 1926, he moved to AAFA and remained assigned to Höfer as a junior partner until 1930. Throughout the 1930s, Hans Minzloff mainly worked on B-movies for smaller production companies; ambitious works such as the Heinrich George drama Stützen der Gesellschaft and the Heinz Rühmann comedy Der Mustergatte remained exceptions. From the outbreak of war in 1939, the production designer also worked for larger companies (Bavaria, Tobis, Terra).

After four years without a film, he was hired by DEFA in 1949. Until the end of his contract in 1958, however, Minzloff was only involved in a few, less important films for the GDR state-owned company, mostly in a subordinate (= construction) function.

== Selected filmography ==
- Our Heavenly Bodies (1925)
- Struggle for the Soil (1925)
- Carnival Magic (1927)
- The Insurmountable (1928)
- The Circus Princess (1929)
- Youth of the Big City (1929)
- Queen of Fashion (1929)
- Tempo! Tempo! (1929)
- Hungarian Nights (1929)
- Foolish Happiness (1929)
- Gentlemen Among Themselves (1929)
- The Black Domino (1929)
- The Daredevil (1931)
- The Page from the Dalmasse Hotel (1933)
- All Because of the Dog (1935)
- Pillars of Society (1935)
- Maria the Maid (1936)
- Stronger Than Regulations (1936)
- The Glass Ball (1937)
- Elephant Fury (1953)
- Emilia Galotti (1958)

== Bibliography ==
- Gerd Gemünden. A Foreign Affair: Billy Wilder's American Films. Berghahn Books, 2008.
