= Botho Hoefer =

German art director (1880–1958)

- Born: 15 May 1880; Berlin, German Empire
- Died: 9 December 1958 (aged 78); West Berlin, West Germany
- Occupation: Art director
- Years active: 1921-1953 (film)

Botho Hoefer (1880–1958) was a German art director.

== Selected filmography ==
- The Golden Plague (1921)
- Lucrezia Borgia (1922)
- Louise de Lavallière (1922)
- The Evangelist (1924)
- The Hobgoblin (1924)
- Lightning (1925)
- The Dice Game of Life (1925)
- Struggle for the Soil (1925)
- Our Emden (1926)
- The Man in the Fire (1926)
- My Friend the Chauffeur (1926)
- A Girl of the People (1927)
- Benno Stehkragen (1927)
- Autumn on the Rhine (1928)
- The Insurmountable (1928)
- Youth of the Big City (1929)
- Tempo! Tempo! (1929)
- Hungarian Nights (1929)
- Gentlemen Among Themselves (1929)
- Foolish Happiness (1929)
- The Black Domino (1929)
- The Circus Princess (1929)
- Queen of Fashion (1929)
- The Corvette Captain (1930)
- The Fate of Renate Langen (1931)
- The Woman They Talk About (1931)
- The Beggar Student (1931)
- Ways to a Good Marriage (1933)
- The Night in Venice (1942)
- Five Suspects (1950)
- The Man Who Wanted to Live Twice (1950)
- House of Life (1952)
- The Great Temptation (1952)

== Bibliography ==
- William B. Parrill. European Silent Films on Video: A Critical Guide. McFarland, 2006.
