= Aafa-Film =

German film company

Aafa Film
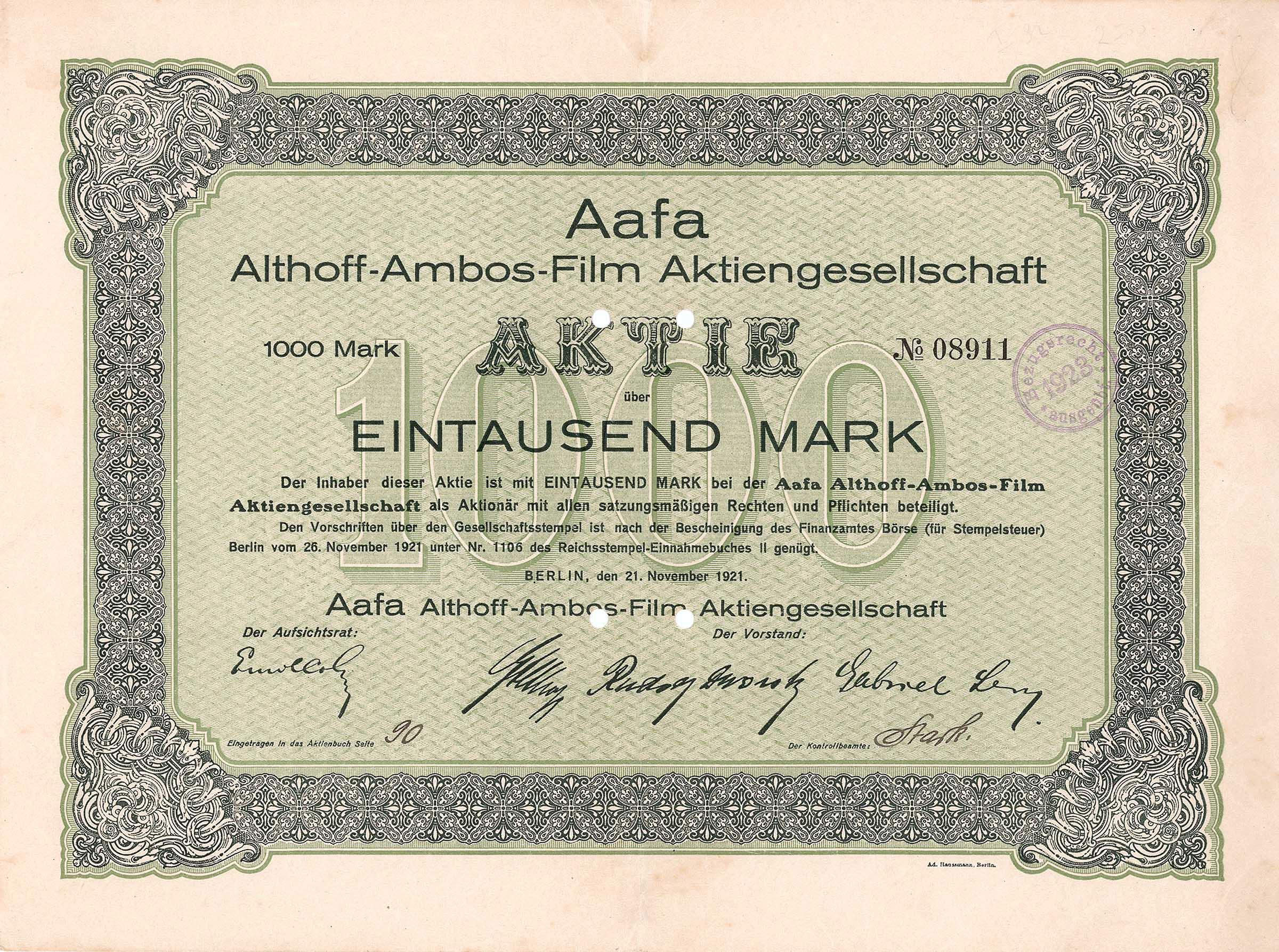
- Share of the Aafa Althoff-Ambos-Film AG, issued 21. November 1921; signed by the principals Rudolf Dworsky and Gabriel Levy
- Native name: Aafa Althoff-Ambos-Film AG
- Company type: Private film production and film distribution company
- Industry: Motion pictures
- Predecessor: Radio-Film (1920)
- Founded: 1920; 106 years ago in Berlin, Germany
- Founders: Gabriel Levy (producer); Rudolf Dworsky (director)
- Defunct: 1934
- Fate: Forcibly disbanded and assets seized during Aryanization under the Nazi regime
- Successor: Assets taken over by major studios (UFA, Tobis, Terra, Bavaria)
- Headquarters: Berlin, Germany (until 1933); Nazi Germany (1933–1934)
- Area served: Germany and international markets (primarily Europe)
- Key people: Gabriel Levy (producer and co-owner); Rudolf Dworsky (director and co-owner)
- Products: Feature films (silent films and early sound films), including one of the earliest German full-length sound films It's You I Have Loved (1929)

Aafa Film or Aafa-Film was a German film production and distribution company which operated during the 1920s and 1930s. Established in 1920 as Radio-Film the company was controlled by the producer Gabriel Levy and the director Rudolf Dworsky. The company was one of the leading producers of the Weimar Republic, and survived the transition from silent to sound film in 1929. It made the first German full sound film (as opposed to part-sound films or silent films with sound added later) It's You I Have Loved that year. During the early 1930s Aafa produced a number of mountain films directed by Arnold Fanck. It also made a multi-language version musical Lieutenant, Were You Once a Hussar? (1930).

In 1934 the company was forcibly disbanded and its assets taken over during the Aryanization programme of the Nazi Party which confiscated businesses from Jewish ownership. This was also part of a wider move which led to production being concentrated in the hands of four major studios Bavaria, Tobis, Terra and UFA.

== Selected filmography ==
- Only One Night (1922)
- Bigamy (1922)
- The Big Thief (1922)
- William Tell (1923)
- The Treasure of Gesine Jacobsen (1923)
- The Little Duke (1924)
- Ash Wednesday (1925)
- In the Valleys of the Southern Rhine (1925)
- The Laughing Husband (1926)
- The Schimeck Family (1926)
- The Divorcée (1926)
- Sword and Shield (1926)
- The Adventurers (1926)
- Schützenliesel (1926)
- Vienna, How it Cries and Laughs (1926)
- Kissing Is No Sin (1926)
- Circle of Lovers (1927)
- The Beggar Student (1927)
- A Girl of the People (1927)
- Rhenish Girls and Rhenish Wine (1927)
- Weekend Magic (1927)
- Marriage (1928)
- The Criminal of the Century (1928)
- The Game of Love (1928)
- The Adjutant of the Czar (1929)
- Gentlemen Among Themselves (1929)
- It's You I Have Loved (1929)
- Foolish Happiness (1929)
- Tempo! Tempo! (1929)
- Youth of the Big City (1929)
- Hungarian Nights (1929)
- Queen of Fashion (1929)
- Love in the Snow (1929)
- The White Hell of Pitz Palu (1929)
- Mascots (1929)
- The Circus Princess (1929)
- The Black Domino (1929)
- Danube Waltz (1930)
- Lieutenant, Were You Once a Hussar? (1930)
- The Corvette Captain (1930)
- The Fate of Renate Langen (1931)
- Peace of Mind (1931)
- My Heart Longs for Love (1931)
- The White Ecstasy (1931)
- Victoria and Her Hussar (1931)
- The Beggar Student (1931)
- The Woman They Talk About (1931)
- Adventures in the Engadin (1932)
- Distorting at the Resort (1932)
- The Dancer of Sanssouci (1932)
- Theodor Körner (1932)
- Once There Was a Waltz (1932)
- Two Lucky Days (1932)
- The Sun Rises (1934)

== Bibliography ==
- Kreimeier, Klaus. The Ufa story: a history of Germany's greatest film company, 1918–1945. University of California Press, 1999.
