= Three Nights =

1920 film directed by Carl Boese

- Theatrical film poster
- German: Drei Nächte
- Directed by: Carl Boese
- Written by: Victor Alt; Werner Brandt
- Starring: Otto Gebühr; Grete Hollmann; Sybill Morel
- Cinematography: Hans Karl Gottschalk; Mutz Greenbaum
- Production company: Firmament-Film
- Release date: 1 July 1920
- Country: Germany
- Languages: Silent; German intertitles

Three Nights (German: Drei Nächte) is a 1920 German silent film directed by Carl Boese and starring Otto Gebühr, Grete Hollmann, and Sybill Morel.

The film's sets were designed by the art director Fritz Kraenke.

== Cast ==
- Otto Gebühr as American
- Grete Hollmann as Kokette
- Sybill Morel as sick woman
- Reinhold Schünzel as criminal
- Leo Selma
