= The Girl from Frisco =

1927 film

- Directed by: Wolfgang Neff
- Written by: Marie Luise Droop; Karl Figdor (novella)
- Starring: Henry Bender; Rudolf Klein-Rogge; Erna Morena
- Cinematography: A.O. Weitzenberg
- Production company: Orplid-Film
- Distributed by: Messtro-Orplid
- Release date: 22 December 1927
- Country: Germany
- Languages: Silent; German intertitles

The Girl from Frisco (German: Das Mädchen aus Frisco) is a 1927 German silent film directed by Wolfgang Neff and starring Henry Bender, Rudolf Klein-Rogge and Erna Morena.

The film's art direction was by Artur Gunther.

== Cast ==
In alphabetical order

- Henry Bender
- Rudolf Klein-Rogge
- Erna Morena
- Hermann Picha
- Louis Ralph
- Ernst Rückert
- Mammey Terja-Basa
- Helga Thomas
- Egon von Jordan

== Bibliography ==
- Hans-Michael Bock and Tim Bergfelder. The Concise Cinegraph: An Encyclopedia of German Cinema. Berghahn Books.
