= The Second Shot =

- The Second Shot (1923 film)
- The Second Shot (1943 film)
