= Raid (1921 film) =

1921 film

- Directed by: Wolfgang Neff
- Written by: Jane Bess
- Produced by: Liddy Hegewald
- Starring: Maria Forescu; Willy Fritsch
- Cinematography: Marius Holdt
- Production company: Hegewald Film
- Distributed by: Hegewald Film
- Release date: 28 October 1921
- Country: Germany
- Languages: Silent; German intertitles

Raid (German:Razzia) is a 1921 German silent film directed by Wolfgang Neff and featuring Maria Forescu and Willy Fritsch.

The film's sets were designed by the art director Mathieu Oostermann.

== Cast ==
In alphabetical order

- Maria Forescu as Blanchette
- Willy Fritsch as Heinrich
- Walter Halde as Lucies Freund
- Loo Hardy as Adele
- Fred Immler as Fabrikant Hirtes
- Walter Liedtke as Felix - ein Schuster
- Lotte Paulsen as Lusie
- Anna von Palen as Bettlerin

== Bibliography ==
- Hans-Michael Bock and Tim Bergfelder. The Concise Cinegraph: An Encyclopedia of German Cinema. Berghahn Books.
