= People in Need (disambiguation) =

People in Need is a Czech humanitarian organization.

People in Need may also refer to:

- People in Need, RTE telethon, which created The People in Need Trust, a charity in Ireland
- People in Need, charity created by the Hearst family in response to kidnapping; Sara Jane Moore
- People in Need (film), a 1925 German film

== See also ==
- Children in Need
