= Vacation from Marriage =

Vacation from Marriage may refer to:

- Perfect Strangers (1945 film), a British drama film title Vacation from Marriage in the U.S.
- Vacation from Marriage (1927 film), a German silent comedy film
