= The Cigarette Countess =

1922 film

- Directed by: Wolfgang Neff
- Written by: Jane Bess
- Starring: Esther Carena; Carl Auen; Olga Limburg
- Production company: Orplid-Film
- Distributed by: Orplid-Film
- Release date: July 1922
- Country: Germany
- Languages: Silent; German intertitles

The Cigarette Countess (German: Die Zigarettengräfin) is a 1922 German silent drama film directed by Wolfgang Neff and starring Esther Carena, Carl Auen and Olga Limburg.

The film's sets were designed by the art director Franz Schroedter.

== Cast ==
- Esther Carena
- Carl Auen
- Olga Limburg
- Hermann Picha
- Lo Bergner
- Rolf Prasch
- Alfred Schmasow
