= A Dream of Happiness =

1924 film directed by Paul L. Stein

- Directed by: Paul L. Stein
- Written by: Bobby E. Lüthge
- Cinematography: Frederik Fuglsang; Hans Scheib
- Production company: Trianon-Film
- Distributed by: Trianon-Film
- Release date: 4 April 1924
- Country: Germany
- Languages: Silent; German intertitles

A Dream of Happiness (German: Ein Traum vom Glück) is a 1924 German silent film directed by Paul L. Stein and starring Harry Liedtke, Ferdinand von Alten and Uschi Elleot.

== Cast ==
- Harry Liedtke
- Ferdinand von Alten
- Uschi Elleot
- Agnes Esterhazy
- Fritz Kampers
- Harry Hardt
- Camilla von Hollay
- Claire Rommer
- Max Kronert
- Hans Junkermann
- Jakob Tiedtke
