= The Countess of Sand =

1928 film

- German: Die Sandgräfin
- Directed by: Hans Steinhoff
- Written by: Jane Bess; Ernst B. Fey
- Based on: Die Sandgräfin by Gustav Frenssen
- Starring: Christa Tordy; Käthe von Nagy; Jack Trevor
- Cinematography: Karl Puth
- Production company: Orplid-Film
- Distributed by: Messtro-Orplid
- Release date: 23 February 1928
- Running time: 111 minutes
- Country: Germany
- Languages: Silent; German intertitles

The Countess of Sand (German: Die Sandgräfin) is a 1928 German silent drama film directed by Hans Steinhoff and starring Christa Tordy, Käthe von Nagy and Jack Trevor. It was shot at the Grunewald Studios in Berlin and on location in East Frisia. The film's art direction was by Otto Erdmann and Hans Sohnle.

== Cast ==
- Christa Tordy
- Käthe von Nagy
- Jack Trevor
- Rudolf Klein-Rogge
- Albert Steinrück
- Hermann Picha
- Henry Bender
- Hans Brausewetter
- Gertrud de Lalsky
- Max Gülstorff
- Paul Otto

== Reception ==
The Grazer Tagblatt writes: "This is excellently successful film ... it's remarkable, apart from the enduring moment, which is taken into account in an extremely effective way".
