= Kürschner =

Kürschner is a German-language occupational surname literally meaning "furrier". The word was derived from Slavic, ultimately from the old Slavic word for fur, кърьзно. Notable people with the surname include:

- Izidor "Dori" Kürschner (1885–1940), a Hungarian football (soccer) player and coach
- Joseph Kürschner (1853–1902), German author
- Eugen Kürschner (1890–1939), Hungarian film producer
