= The Heart of Lilian Thorland =

1924 film

- Directed by: Wolfgang Neff
- Written by: Jane Bess
- Starring: Esther Carena; Evi Eva; Hermann Picha
- Production company: Orplid-Film
- Release date: 1 January 1924
- Country: Germany
- Languages: Silent; German intertitles

The Heart of Lilian Thorland (German: Das Herz der Lilian Thorland) is a 1924 German silent film directed by Wolfgang Neff and starring Esther Carena, Evi Eva and Hermann Picha.

The film's sets were designed by the art director Franz Schroedter.

== Cast ==
- Esther Carena
- Evi Eva
- Hermann Picha
- Hermann Vallentin
- Oskar Marion
- Heinrich Schroth
- Karl Falkenberg
- Albert Patry
- Kurt Brenkendorf
- Henri Peters-Arnolds
- Charles Lincoln
- Dora Bergner

== Bibliography ==
- Alfred Krautz. International directory of cinematographers, set- and costume designers in film, Volume 4. Saur, 1984.
