= The Marriage Swindler =

The Marriage Swindler may refer to:

- The Marriage Swindler (1922 film), a German silent comedy film
- The Marriage Swindler (1925 film), a German silent drama film
- The Marriage Swindler (1938 film), a German drama film
