= Tordy =

Tordy is a surname. Notable people with the surname include:

- Christa Tordy (1904–1945), German film actress
- Géza Tordy (1938–2024), Hungarian actor
