= Poison Gas =

Poison Gas may refer to:

- a toxic gas
- a chemical weapon
  - Chemical weapons in World War I
- Poison Gas (film), a 1929 German silent drama
