= Angel in Séparée =

1929 film

- Directed by: Ernö Mayer
- Written by: Hans Schönlank
- Cinematography: Johann Alexander Hübler-Kahla
- Production company: Artus-Film
- Release date: 1929
- Country: Germany
- Languages: Silent; German intertitles

Angel in Séparée (German: Engel im Séparée) is a 1929 German silent film directed by Ernö Mayer and starring Elizza La Porta, Rolf von Goth and Sybill Morel. It was shot at the Grunewald Studios in Berlin. The film's art direction was by Mathieu Oostermann.

== Cast ==
- Elizza La Porta
- Rolf von Goth
- Sybill Morel
- Robert Garrison
- Karl Falkenberg
- Gerhard Dammann
- Olga Engl
