= Fratricide (film) =

1922 film

- Directed by: Wolfgang Neff
- Written by: Jane Bess
- Produced by: Liddy Hegewald
- Starring: Lilly Flohr; Willy Kaiser-Heyl; Robert Scholz
- Cinematography: Eugen Hamm
- Production company: Hegewald Film
- Distributed by: Hegewald Film
- Release date: 21 January 1922
- Country: Germany
- Languages: Silent; German intertitles

Fratricide (German: Brudermord) is a 1922 German silent drama film directed by Wolfgang Neff and starring Lilly Flohr, Willy Kaiser-Heyl and Robert Scholz.

The film's sets were designed by the art director Mathieu Oostermann.

== Cast ==
- Victor Colani
- Lilly Flohr
- Willy Kaiser-Heyl as Professor Vanhagen
- Martha Orlanda
- Robert Scholz as Dr. Harry Kellerburg

== Bibliography ==
- Grange, William. Cultural Chronicle of the Weimar Republic. Scarecrow Press, 2008.
