= Eric Barclay =

Swedish actor (1894–1938)

- Born: 17 November 1894; Lilla Malma, Sweden
- Died: 14 January 1938 (aged 43); Bälinge, Sweden
- Other name: Erik Altberg
- Occupation: Film actor
- Years active: 1917–1934

Eric Barclay (born Erik Altberg, 1894–1938) was a Swedish film actor. Barclay became a prominent actor in French silent films of the early 1920s, often working with director Jacques de Baroncelli. He also appeared in German and British films, and those of his native Sweden.

== Selected filmography ==
- Enchantment (1920)
- Judge Not (1920)
- The Corner Man (1921)
- Roger la Honte (1922)
- Das Spielzeug von Paris (1925)
- Faust (1926)
- Three Cuckoo Clocks (1926)
- The Glass Boat (1927)
- The Porter from Maxim's (1927)
- Tales from the Vienna Woods (1928)
- The Man with the Limp (1928)
- The Gambling Den of Montmartre (1928)
- Who Invented Divorce? (1928)
- The Little Match Girl (1928)
- Charlotte Löwensköld (1930)
- Kungliga Johansson (1934)

== Bibliography ==
- Powrie, Phil & Rebillard, Éric. Pierre Batcheff and Stardom in 1920s French Cinema. Edinburgh University Press, 2009.
