= William Dieterle =

German/American actor and film director (1893–1972)

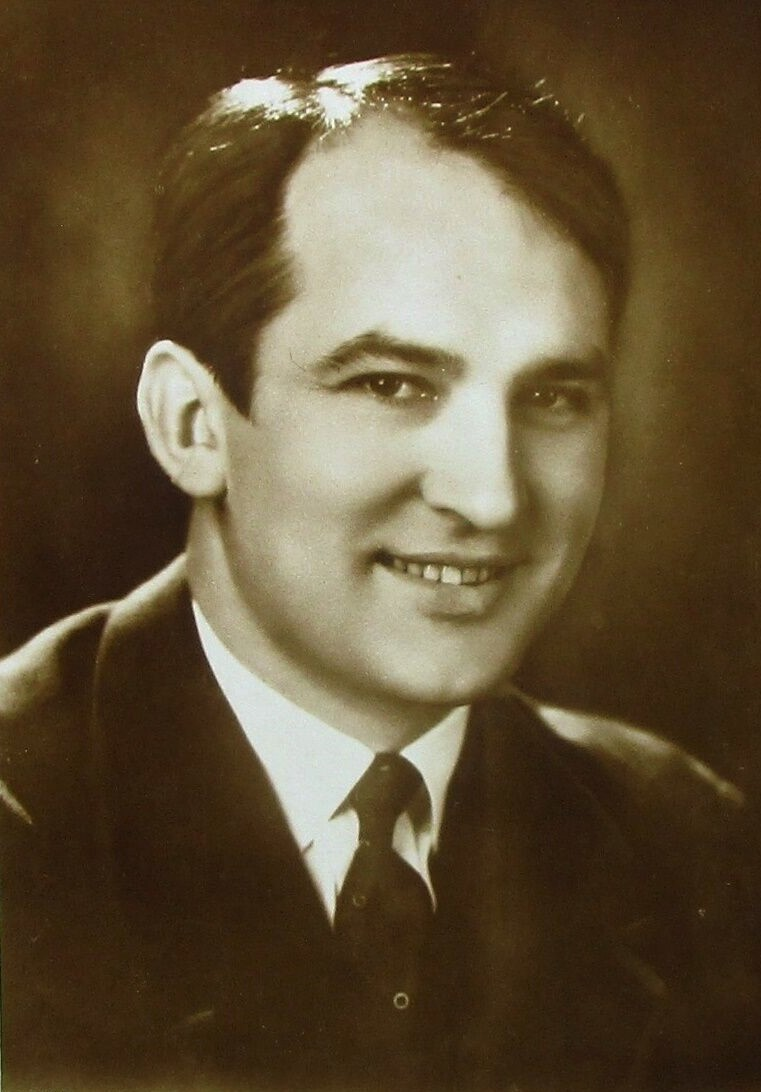
- Dieterle, ca. 1928
- Born: Wilhelm Dieterle; July 15, 1893; Ludwigshafen, Rhineland Palatinate, German Empire
- Died: December 9, 1972 (aged 79); Ottobrunn, Bavaria, West Germany
- Occupations: Actor; film director
- Years active: 1911–1966
- Spouse: Charlotte Hagenbruch (1896–1968)

William Dieterle (July 15, 1893 – December 9, 1972) was a German-born actor and film director who emigrated to the United States in 1930 to leave a worsening political situation. He worked in Hollywood primarily as a director for much of his career, becoming a United States citizen in 1937. He moved back to Germany in the late 1950s.

His best-known films include The Story of Louis Pasteur (1936), The Hunchback of Notre Dame (1939) and The Devil and Daniel Webster (1941). His film The Life of Emile Zola (1937) won the Academy Award for Best Picture, the second biographical feature to do so.

== Early life and career ==
He was born Wilhelm Dieterle in Ludwigshafen, the youngest child of nine, to factory worker Jacob and Berthe (Doerr) Dieterle. As a child, he lived in considerable poverty and earned money by various means, including carpentry and as a scrap dealer. He became interested in theater early and would stage productions in the family barn for friends and family.

At the age of sixteen, Dieterle had joined a traveling theater company as a handy-man, scene shifter, and apprentice actor. His striking good looks and ambition soon paved his way to gain roles as a leading romantic actor in theater productions. In 1919, he attracted the attention of theater director Max Reinhardt in Berlin, who hired him as an actor for his productions until 1924. He started acting in German films in 1921 to make more money and quickly became a popular character actor. He usually portrayed "country yokels" or simpletons with great gusto and popularity, but he was ambitious to begin a career as a director. In 1921, Dieterle married Charlotte Hagenbruch, an actress and later screenwriter.

In 1923, Dieterle used his own money to make his first film, Der Mensch am Wege. Based on the Leo Tolstoy short story "Where Love Is, God Is", the film co-starred a young Marlene Dietrich. Years later Dieterle said of the film, "we were just four or five very young, enthusiastic, and revolutionary people who wanted to do something different. We brought it out; it didn't make any money, but was shown and it was an interesting experiment." In 1924, Dieterle left Reinhardt's company and formed his own theater company in Berlin, although it was unsuccessful and short lived. He also returned to film acting for several years and appeared in such notable German films as Das Wachsfigurenkabinett (Waxworks) (1924) and F. W. Murnau's Faust (1926). In 1927, Dieterle and his wife formed their own production company, Charrha-Film. Dieterle returned to directing films, such as Sex in Chains (1928), in which he also played the lead role.

== Hollywood career: 1930s ==
In 1930, the political and economic situations in Germany worsened. Like many from the German film industry, Dieterle and his wife emigrated to the United States. Dieterle had said, "It was a running joke in Berlin...if the phone rang at a restaurant they said it must be Hollywood. Well, one night my wife and I were dining out and it really happened." Dieterle was offered a job at First National to make German-language dubbed versions of Hollywood films, as the studios were afraid of losing foreign business with the advent of sound films. But when Dieterle, his wife and a group of actors arrived, they found that the films had already been dubbed. They were chosen as actors in German-language versions of four Hollywood films, including Lloyd Bacon's Moby Dick (1930), in which Dieterle played Ahab. After the four films were completed, Warner Brothers' Vice President of Production Hal B. Wallis was so impressed that he invited Dieterle to stay in Hollywood. He became a US citizen in 1937.

Dieterle adapted quickly to Hollywood filmmaking and directed his first film, The Last Flight in 1931. The film depicts four American fighter pilots who roam around Paris after World War I trying to put their lives back together. It starred Richard Barthelmess and Helen Chandler, and the plot was compared to the work of F. Scott Fitzgerald. Although not a success on its first run, it was hailed as a forgotten masterpiece at a 1970 revival screening. Dieterle's initial Hollywood career was neither successful nor notable. It included such films as the W. C. Fields musical Her Majesty, Love (1932), Jewel Robbery (1932), Adorable (1933), and Fog Over Frisco (1934) with Bette Davis.

In 1934, Max Reinhardt was staging a version of A Midsummer Night's Dream at the Hollywood Bowl in Los Angeles. Dieterle convinced Warner Brothers to finance a big budget version of the film with an all-star cast. The resulting film, A Midsummer Night's Dream (1935), revitalized Dieterle's career and he became a major Hollywood director. Starring James Cagney, Olivia de Havilland, Joe E. Brown and a 15-year-old Mickey Rooney, the film had very mixed reviews for its "Americanization" of Shakespeare, but was a success on release. It is now considered a classic. During production, Reinhardt would rehearse the actors and then let Dieterle direct the film.

Dieterle directed the first of his hugely successful "biography films" with actor Paul Muni, beginning with The Story of Louis Pasteur (1936). The film stars Muni as the scientist who discovered the principles of vaccination and struggled against a skeptical medical community. The film was a success both critically and financially, and earned Muni an Oscar for Best Actor. It also helped to establish Warner Brothers as a producer of "prestige pictures" after almost a decade of being known primarily for crime dramas. Dieterle was asked to direct several films which he did not like; he said "at Warners the moment you had a success they gave you something terrible to keep you from getting a swelled head." These films included the second version of Dashiell Hammett's The Maltese Falcon (Satan Met a Lady with Bette Davis), The Prince and the Pauper, and a bio-pic about Florence Nightingale, The White Angel.

Dieterle made another bio-pic with Paul Muni, The Life of Emile Zola (1937). Based on the life of the French philosopher and novelist Zola, the film explores Zola's response to the Dreyfus affair, in which the falsely accused and convicted Jewish French officer was found guilty of treason and imprisoned. The film was an enormous success and critic Frank S. Nugent ranked it as "the finest historical film ever made and the greatest screen biography." It was nominated for 10 Academy Awards and won for Best Picture, Best Supporting Actor for Joseph Schildkraut (as Dreyfus) and Best Screenplay. Dieterle lost the award for Best Director to Leo McCarey. It was his only nomination.

Dieterle's next film was Blockade (1938), starring Henry Fonda as a dedicated Loyalist fighter and Madeleine Carroll as the reluctant Franco spy who falls in love with him during the Spanish Civil War. The film was openly anti-fascist and critical of nations that stood by and let fascist dictators commit atrocities. Its 1938 premiere at Grauman's Chinese Theater was abruptly and inexplicably cancelled, and it was mildly controversial upon release. During the late 1940s and 1950s it was cited as suspicious by Congressional committees investigating communist influence, such as the House Un-American Activities Committee. Both Dieterle and its screenwriter were viewed negatively.

Juarez (1939) was the third biographical picture that Dieterle made with Muni, depicting the life of Mexican politician Benito Juárez and his conflict with Emperor Maximilian I. Upon its release, Dieterle was called "the quintessential liberal director of the 30s." When interviewed in the 1970s, Dieterle said of the movie, "it should be the biggest kind of picture right now—a big modern army worn down by guerrilla fighters. The parallel with Vietnam is so obvious."

Dieterle found both financial and critical success with The Hunchback of Notre Dame (also 1939). The film stars Charles Laughton as Quasimodo and a 19-year-old Maureen O'Hara as Esmeralda. Dieterle made two more bio-pics, both starring Edward G. Robinson instead of Muni. Dr. Ehrlich's Magic Bullet (1940) is about Paul Ehrlich's discovery of Salvarsan, which made syphilis curable; and A Dispatch from Reuter's (also 1940), is about the man who established the first news agency. These were Dieterle's last films for Warner Brothers.

== Hollywood career: 1940s ==
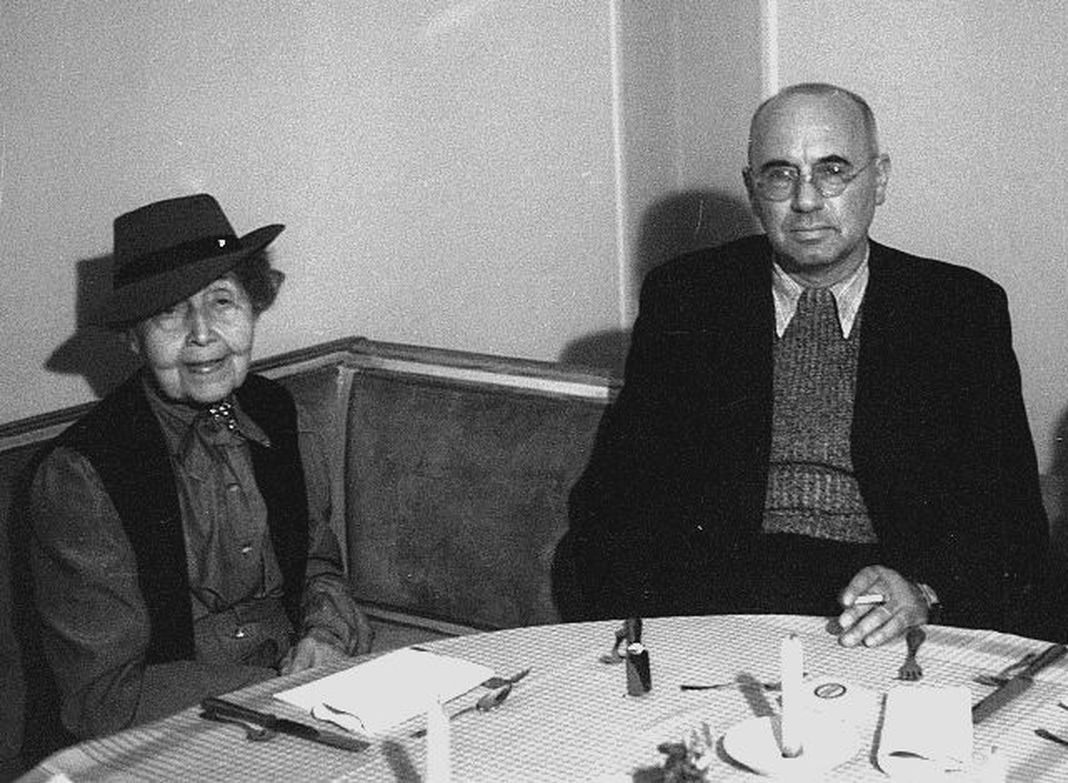
William Dieterle with Ricarda Huch in Berlin (1946)

While many commentators at the time felt that his career had reached a peak in the 1930s, it is now believed that the films of this period contain some of his best work. David Thomson, for instance, has written that the bio-pics of the 1930s are "ponderous, Germanic works, suffering from staginess and the unrestrained histrionics of Paul Muni." By the time he was working for Selznick in the 1940s, the director's "sense of almost supernatural atmosphere" matched those of his producer, while his later works "all suggest, if not a late flowering, a realization that his talent was for the lavish romantic."

The Devil and Daniel Webster (also known as All That Money Can Buy, 1941) is a gothic fantasy and loose adaptation of the Faust legend set in New Hampshire during the 1840s. It stars Walter Huston and Edward Arnold as the titular Prince of Darkness and early Congressman, who battle over the soul of Jabez Stone after an ill-conceived deal with the devil. Although unsuccessful upon its initial release, it is today a classic with Noirish cinematography by Joe August, Oscar-winning score by Bernard Herrmann, and still impressive special effects.

After the de facto World War II-era propaganda of Tennessee Johnson (1942; a bio-pic of poorly rated President Andrew Johnson with Van Heflin and Lionel Barrymore) and a remake of Kismet (1944) with Ronald Colman and Marlene Dietrich, Love Letters (1945) stars Joseph Cotten as a soldier who writes love letters on behalf of a friend during World War II. Jennifer Jones stars as the recipient of the letters who falls in love with the writer. Years after the war, Cotten tracks down Jones only to find that she has lost her memory and apparently killed her husband. The film was produced by Jones's then husband David O. Selznick, who also produced Dieterle's next film.

Portrait of Jennie (1948) stars Cotten and Jones as a painter and his muse. After meeting in Central Park one day, Cotten paints a portrait of Jones that makes him famous, but is unable to find his muse who he has fallen in love with. The film's budget dramatically increased during production and Selznick was forced to sell Dieterle's contract to Paramount Pictures, where his career never reached the heights of the previous 15 years.

== Later career ==
Dieterle's career declined in the 1950s during the era of McCarthyism. Although he was never blacklisted directly, his Spanish Republic-sympathetic film Blockade (1938), in addition to people he had worked with, were thought to be suspect. Also, in the 1930s he and his wife had worked to help get people out of Nazi Germany and given aid to many left-wing friends, including Bertolt Brecht. Of this period, Dieterle said: "Although I was never to my knowledge on any blacklist, I must have been on some kind of gray list because I couldn't get any work."

He continued to make American films in the 1950s, including the film noir The Turning Point (1952) and Salome (1953) with Rita Hayworth. Production for Elephant Walk (1954) with Elizabeth Taylor was held up for three months when the State Department would not allow Dieterle to travel to Ceylon. He made two more Hollywood films before moving back to Europe: a biopic of Richard Wagner, Magic Fire (1955) for Republic Pictures and Omar Khayyam (1957).

He made some films in Germany and Italy, and an American flop, Quick, Let's Get Married (1964) – also known as The Confession or Seven Different Ways – with Ginger Rogers before retiring from film in 1965. He moved back to Germany and became the director of the Der Grüne Wagen theatre, then based in Taufkirchen near Munich, which he ran together with his wife, Charlotte Hagenbruch. After his wife's death in May 1968, he ran the theatre with his new wife, Elisabeth Daum, as a touring theatre. Dieterle directed the ensemble for several years, with Elisabeth Bergner as his leading lady.

Dieterle is remembered for always wearing a large hat and white gloves on set. This was due to needing to quickly change roles from actor to technician without dirtying his hands during his early career.

== Selected filmography ==
- The Masked Ones (1920)
- The Vulture Wally (1921)
- The Conspiracy in Genoa (1921)
- Marie Antoinette, the Love of a King (1922)
- Lucrezia Borgia (1922)
- Miss Julie (1922)
- Women's Sacrifice (1922)
- La Boheme (1923)
- Man by the Wayside (1923)
- The Pagoda (1923)
- The Second Shot (1923)
- The Green Manuela (1923)
- Mother and Child (1924)
- Waxworks (1924)
- Modern Marriages (1924)
- Carlos and Elisabeth (1924)
- Cock of the Roost (1925)
- The Woman from Berlin (1925)
- In the Valleys of the Southern Rhine (1925)
- Lightning (1925)
- The Flower Girl of Potsdam Square (1925)
- Sword and Shield (1926)
- The Bohemian Dancer (1926)
- The Pink Diamond (1926)
- Torments of the Night (1926)
- The Priest from Kirchfeld (1926)
- The Schimeck Family (1926)
- Hell of Love (1926)
- The Circus of Life (1926)
- The Hunter of Fall (1926)
- The Fallen (1926)
- The Mill at Sanssouci (1926)
- Circle of Lovers (1927)
- The Weavers (1927)
- Homesick (1927)
- Excluded from the Public (1927)
- At the Edge of the World (1927)
- Behind the Altar (1927)
- The Gypsy Baron (1927)
- The Saint and Her Fool (1928)
- Sex in Chains (1928)
- Violantha (1928)
- Thieves (1928)
- Knights of the Night (1928)
- Durchs Brandenburger Tor. Solang noch Untern Linden (1929)
- Ich lebe für Dich (1929)
- Rustle of Spring (1929)
- Das Schweigen im Walde (1929)
- Ludwig II, King of Bavaria (1929)
- The Dance Goes On (1930)
- Moby Dick (German-language version, 1930)
- The Last Flight (1931)
- Kismet (German-language version, 1931)
- The Mask Falls (1931)
- The Sacred Flame (1931)
- One Hour of Happiness (1931)
- Her Majesty, Love (1931)
- Man Wanted (1932)
- Jewel Robbery (1932)
- The Crash (1932)
- Six Hours to Live (1932)
- Scarlet Dawn (1932)
- Lawyer Man (1933)
- Grand Slam (1933)
- Adorable (1933)
- The Devil's in Love (1933)
- Female (1933)
- From Headquarters (1933)
- Fog Over Frisco (1934)
- Fashions of 1934 (1934)
- Madame Du Barry (1934)
- Dr. Monica (uncredited, 1934)
- The Firebird (1934)
- The Secret Bride (1934)
- A Midsummer Night's Dream (1935)
- Dr. Socrates (1935)
- The Story of Louis Pasteur (1935)
- The White Angel (1936)
- Satan Met a Lady (1936)
- The Great O'Malley (1937)
- The Prince and the Pauper (uncredited, 1937)
- Another Dawn (1937)
- The Life of Emile Zola (1937)
- Blockade (1938)
- Juarez (1939)
- The Hunchback of Notre Dame (1939)
- Dr. Ehrlich's Magic Bullet (1940)
- A Dispatch from Reuter's (1940)
- The Devil and Daniel Webster (1941)
- Syncopation (1942)
- Tennessee Johnson (1943)
- Kismet (1944)
- I'll Be Seeing You (1945)
- Love Letters (1945)
- This Love of Ours (1945)
- The Searching Wind (1946)
- Duel in the Sun (uncredited, 1946)
- Portrait of Jennie (1948)
- The Accused (1949)
- Rope of Sand (1949)
- Paid in Full (1950)
- Vulcano (1950)
- September Affair (1950)
- Dark City (1950)
- Peking Express (1951)
- Red Mountain (1951)
- Boots Malone (1952)
- The Turning Point (1952)
- Salome (1953)
- Elephant Walk (1954)
- Magic Fire (1955)
- Screen Directors Playhouse: One Against Many (TV, 1956)
- Omar Khayyam (1957)
- Dubrowsky (1959)
- Mistress of the World (1960)
- Ich fand Julia Harrington (TV, 1960)
- Carnival Confession (1960)
- Die große Reise (TV, 1961)
- Gabriel Schillings Flucht (TV, 1962)
- Das Vergnügen, anständig zu sein (TV, 1962)
- Antigone (TV, 1962)
- The Confession (1964)
- Samba (TV, 1966)

== See also ==
- The Continental Players, co-founded by Dieterle

== Bibliography ==
- Books
  - Close up : the contract director.- Metuchen; New-York : Scarecrow Press, 1976.
  - Strangers in paradise : the Hollywood emigres 1933–1950 / John Russel Taylor.- London : Faber & Faber, 1983 ISBN 1-892597-00-4
  - William Dieterle / Hervé Dumont.- Paris : CNRS éditions : Cinémathèque française, 2002
  - William Dieterle, der Plutarch von Hollywood / Marta Mierendorff.- Berlin 1993 ISBN 2-271-06001-X
- Magazines
  - Avant-Scène du Cinéma, n° 196, November 1977
  - Cahiers du Cinéma, n° 532, February 1999
  - Classic Film Collector, n° 50, Springtime 1976
  - Ecran, n° 12, February 1973
  - Film in Review, vol 8 n° 4, April 1957
  - Jeune Cinéma, n° 222, May–June 1993
  - Sight and Sound vol 22 n° 1, July–September 1952
  - Sight and Sound, vol 19 n° 3, May 1950
  - Velvet Light Trap, n° 15, Autumn 1975
  - Wide Angle, vol 8 n° 2, 1986
