= Dawn (1929 film) =

1929 film directed by Wolfgang Nell and Burton George

- Directed by: Wolfgang Neff; Burton George
- Written by: Marie Luise Droop; Richard Freese
- Starring: Paul Henckels; Werner Fuetterer; Carl de Vogt
- Cinematography: Georg Bruckbauer; Reimar Kuntze
- Music by: Bernard Homola
- Production company: Primus-Film
- Distributed by: Werner Film
- Release date: 19 August 1929
- Country: Germany
- Languages: Silent; German intertitles

Dawn or Red Morning (German: Morgenröte) is a 1929 German silent film directed by Wolfgang Neff and Burton George and starring Paul Henckels, Werner Fuetterer and Carl de Vogt.

The film's sets were designed by Fritz Willi Krohn.

== Cast ==
- Paul Henckels as Michael Schwaiger
- Werner Fuetterer as Stephan, sein Sohn
- Carl de Vogt as Bernhard Eggebrecht
- Helga Thomas as Margot, seine Frau
- Elga Brink as Jutta, deren Schwester
- Eugen Burg as Schücking, ein Finanzmann
- Karl Platen as Berthold, ein Hauer
- Evi Eva as Burgl, seine Tochter
- Henry Bender as Der Wirt 'Zur guten Laune'
- Max Maximilian as Obersteiger Bulaski

== Bibliography ==
- Bock, Hans-Michael & Bergfelder, Tim. The Concise Cinegraph: Encyclopaedia of German Cinema. Berghahn Books, 2009.
