= Eternal Allegiance =

1926 film

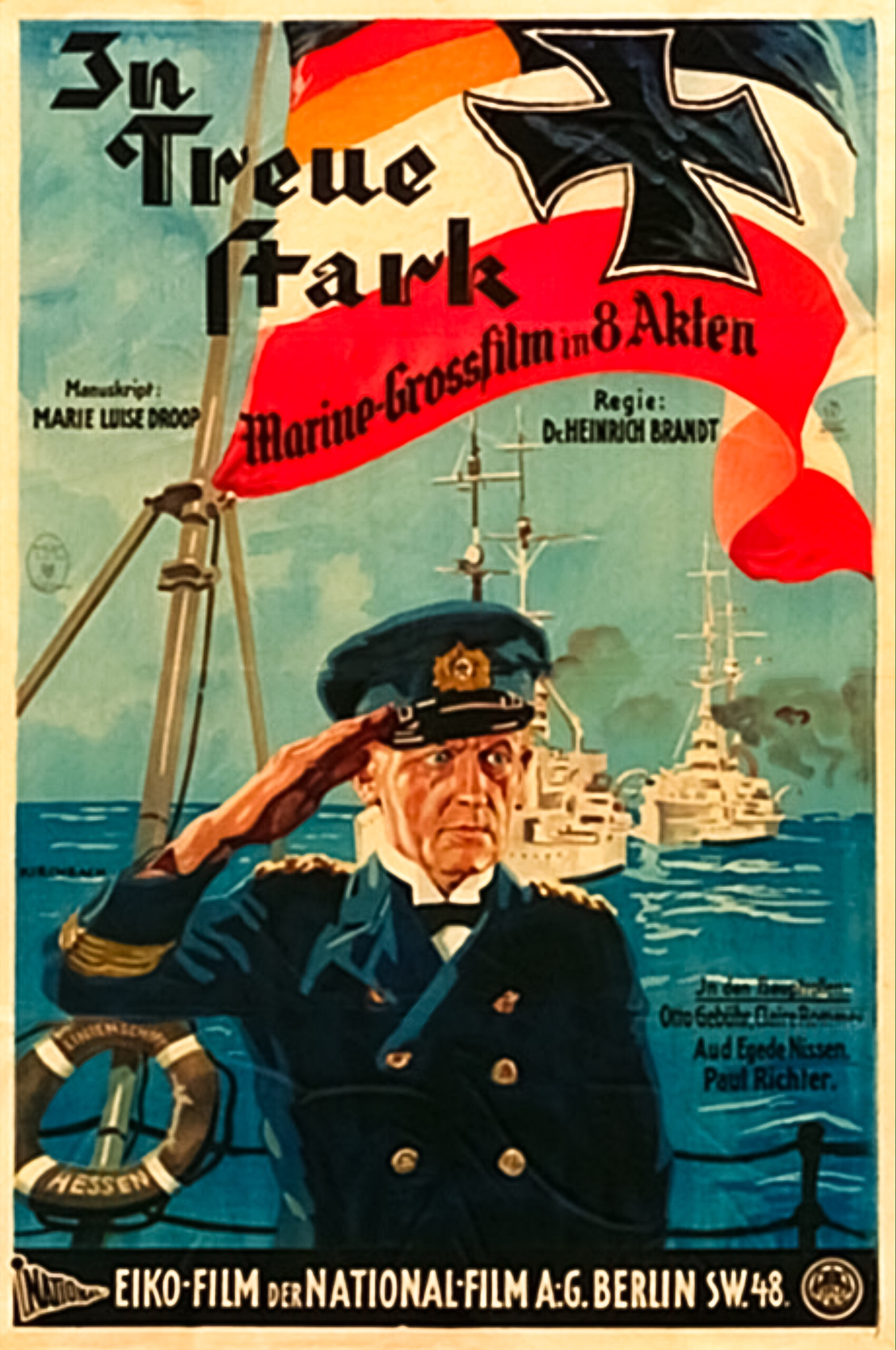
- Directed by: Heinrich Brandt
- Written by: Marie Luise Droop
- Starring: Otto Gebühr; Claire Rommer; Paul Richter
- Cinematography: Werner Bohne; Leopold Kutzleb
- Music by: Willy Schmidt-Gentner
- Production company: Eiko Film
- Distributed by: National Film
- Release date: 1 October 1926
- Running time: 114 minutes
- Country: Germany
- Languages: Silent; German intertitles

Eternal Allegiance (German: In Treue stark) is a 1926 German silent drama film directed by Heinrich Brandt and starring Otto Gebühr, Claire Rommer, and Paul Richter. It was shot at the National Studios in Berlin. The film's sets were designed by the art director Max Knaake.

== Cast ==
- Otto Gebühr as Dietrich Hartung
- Claire Rommer as Brittga Hartung
- Paul Richter as Klaus Hinrichs
- Aud Egede-Nissen as Hanna
- Angelo Ferrari as Fernando
- Margarete Lanner as Beatriz
- Gertrud Arnold as Hermine Eyck
- Erwin Biswanger as Helmut Eyck
- Hans Adalbert Schlettow as Merkens
- Hermann Leffler as Krischan Hinrichs
- Grete Berger as Mutter Hinrichs
- Bernhard Perponché as Billing
- Robert Leffler as Arzt
- Alphons Schünemann as Kind Hartungs

== Bibliography ==
- Bock, Hans-Michael; Bergfelder, Tim, eds. (2009). The Concise Cinegraph: Encyclopaedia of German Cinema. New York: Berghahn Books. ISBN 978-1-57181-655-9.
