= Uschi Elleot =

German actress (1899–1975)

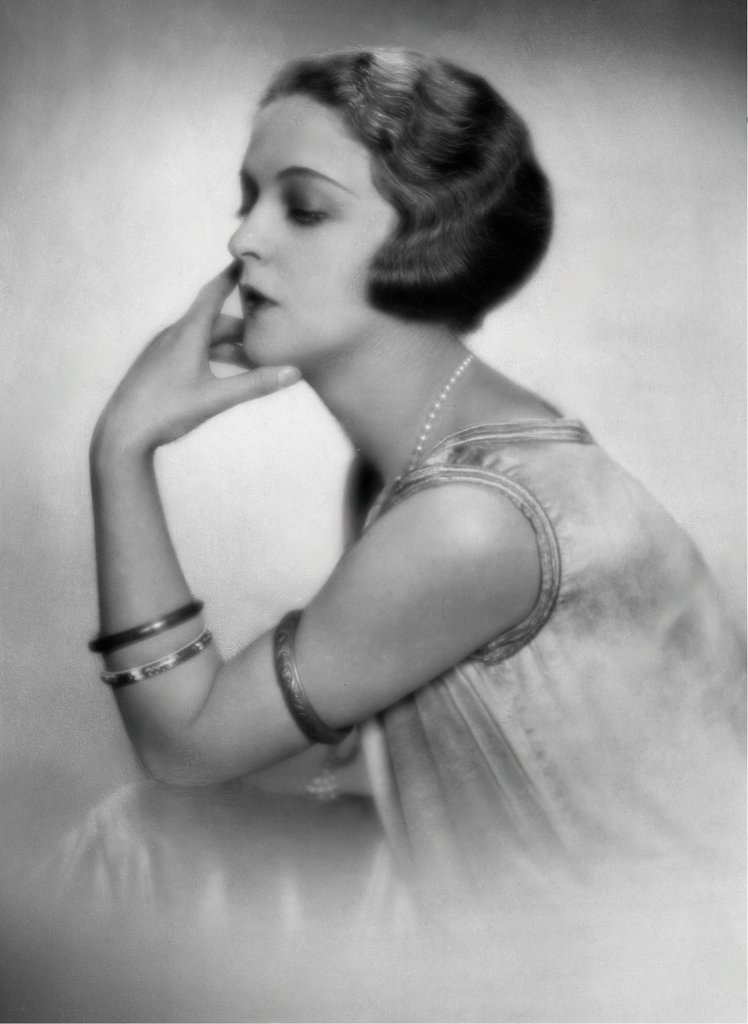
- Born: 18 April 1899; Berlin, Prussia, German Empire
- Died: June 1975 (aged 76); New York City, United States
- Occupation: Actress
- Years active: 1919–1925 (film)

Uschi Elleot (1899–1975) was a German stage and film actress who starred in a number of silent films. She was the younger sister of actress Carola Toelle. After her cinema career ended, she emigrated to the United States and married an American.

== Selected filmography ==
- The White Roses of Ravensberg (1919)
- Schwarzwaldmädel (1920)
- Death the Victor (1920)
- You Are the Life (1921)
- The Handicap of Love (1921)
- Marie Antoinette, the Love of a King (1922)
- Yellow Star (1922)
- La Boheme (1923)
- Lord Reginald's Derby Ride (1924)
- A Dream of Happiness (1924)
- The Alternative Bride (1925)
- In the Valleys of the Southern Rhine (1925)
- The Marriage Swindler (1925)

== Bibliography ==
- Giesen, Rolf. The Nosferatu Story: The Seminal Horror Film, Its Predecessors and Its Enduring Legacy. McFarland, 2019.
- Goble, Alan. The Complete Index to Literary Sources in Film. Walter de Gruyter, 1999.
- Hardt, Ursula. From Caligari to California: Erich Pommer's Life in the International Film Wars. Berghahn Books, 1996.
