= Death the Victor =

1920 film by Nils Olaf Chrisander

- Directed by: Nils Olaf Chrisander
- Written by: Julius Sternheim
- Produced by: Rudolf Meinert; Erich Pommer
- Starring: Uschi Elleot; Werner Krauss; Johannes Riemann
- Cinematography: A.O. Weitzenberg
- Production company: Decla-Bioscop
- Distributed by: Decla-Bioscop
- Release date: 5 August 1920
- Country: Germany
- Languages: Silent; German intertitles

Death the Victor (German: Sieger Tod) is a 1920 German silent film directed by Nils Olaf Chrisander and starring Uschi Elleot, Werner Krauss and Johannes Riemann.

== Cast ==
In alphabetical order

- Uschi Elleot as Eva
- Werner Krauss as Dr. Olaf Karsten
- Johannes Riemann as Harald Gorrit
- Ernst Stahl-Nachbaur as Prof. Ernst Gorrit
- Ilse Wilke as Evas Mutter
