= The Corner Man =

1921 British film by Einar Bruun

- Directed by: Einar Bruun
- Written by: Frank Powell
- Production company: Harma-Associated Exhibitors
- Release date: December 1921
- Country: United Kingdom
- Languages: Silent; English intertitles

The Corner Man is a 1921 British silent drama film directed by Einar Bruun and starring Ida Lambert, Eric Barclay and Sydney Folker.

== Cast ==
- Ida Lambert as Mary Warner
- Eric Barclay as Hugh Morland
- Sydney Folker as Jim
- A. Harding Steerman
- Hugh E. Wright as Bob Warner

== Bibliography ==
- Palmer Scott. British Film Actors' Credits, 1895-1987. McFarland, 1988.
