= Who Invented Divorce? =

1928 film

- Directed by: Wolfgang Neff
- Written by: Jane Bess; Nino Ottavi
- Starring: Alfred Abel; Hans Albers; Charlotte Ander
- Cinematography: Mutz Greenbaum
- Music by: Willy Schmidt-Gentner
- Production company: Orplid-Film
- Distributed by: Messtro-Film
- Release date: 14 April 1928
- Country: Germany
- Languages: Silent; German intertitles

Who Invented Divorce? (German: Wer das Scheiden hat erfunden) is a 1928 German silent film directed by Wolfgang Neff and starring Alfred Abel, Hans Albers and Caleb Glenn.

The film's sets were designed by Otto Erdmann and Hans Sohnle.

== Cast ==
In alphabetical order

- Alfred Abel
- Hans Albers
- Charlotte Ander
- Betty Astor
- Eric Barclay
- Eugen Burg
- Piotr Zieliński
- Mary Parker
- Else Reval
- Ernö Verebes

== Bibliography ==
- Bock, Hans-Michael & Bergfelder, Tim. The Concise Cinegraph: Encyclopaedia of German Cinema. Berghahn Books, 2009.
