= The Sinner (1928 film) =

1928 film directed by Mario Bonnard

- Directed by: Mario Bonnard
- Written by: Margarete-Maria Langen
- Starring: Elisabeth Pinajeff; Hans Stüwe; Helga Thomas
- Cinematography: Giovanni Vitrotti
- Music by: Hansheinrich Dransmann
- Production company: Deutsche PDC Film
- Distributed by: National Film
- Release date: 21 May 1928
- Country: Germany
- Languages: Silent; German intertitles

The Sinner (German: Die Sünderin) is a 1928 German silent drama film directed by Mario Bonnard and starring Elisabeth Pinajeff, Hans Stüwe, and Helga Thomas. The film's art direction was by Max Knaake.

== Cast ==
- Elisabeth Pinajeff as Odette Aubin
- Hans Stüwe as Gaston
- Helga Thomas as Maria
- Hans Mierendorff as Odettes Vater
- Hermine Sterler as Odettes Mutter
- John Loder as Armand
- Angelo Ferrari as Der Bankier
- Helene von Bolváry as Die Prinzessin

== Bibliography ==
- Grange, William (2008). Cultural Chronicle of the Weimar Republic. Lanham, MD: Scarecrow Press. ISBN 978-0-8108-5967-8.
