= The Handicap of Love =

1921 film

- Directed by: Martin Hartwig
- Written by: Alfred Fekete; Paul Rosenhayn
- Cinematography: Carl Drews
- Production company: PAGU
- Distributed by: UFA
- Release date: 9 September 1921
- Country: Germany
- Languages: Silent; German intertitles

The Handicap of Love (German:Das Handicap der Liebe) is a 1921 German silent crime film directed by Martin Hartwig and starring Ferdinand von Alten, Magnus Stifter and Hermann Böttcher. It features the detective character Joe Deebs.

The film's art direction was by Robert Neppach.

== Cast ==
- Ferdinand von Alten as Joe Deebs, Detective
- Magnus Stifter as Jonathan Walpole
- Hermann Böttcher as Morris Harryman
- Gertrude Hoffman as Regina Walpole
- Oscar Marion as Rodger Cleveland, Herrenreiter
- Uschi Elleot as Carry Cleveland
- Alfred Gerasch as O'Brien
- Karl Harbacher
- Theodor Burghardt

== Bibliography ==
- Grange, William. Cultural Chronicle of the Weimar Republic. Scarecrow Press, 2008.
