= One Plus One Equals Three =

1927 film

- German: Eins + Eins = Drei
- Directed by: Felix Basch
- Written by: Béla Balázs; Henry Koster
- Starring: Veit Harlan; Georg Alexander; Claire Rommer
- Cinematography: Edgar S. Ziesemer
- Music by: Pasquale Perris
- Production company: Prometheus Film
- Distributed by: Prometheus Film
- Release date: 9 December 1927
- Country: Germany
- Languages: Silent; German intertitles

One Plus One Equals Three (German: Eins + Eins = Drei) is a 1927 German silent film directed by Felix Basch and starring Veit Harlan, Georg Alexander, and Claire Rommer.

The film's art direction was by Heinrich Richter.

== Cast ==
- Veit Harlan as Paul
- Georg Alexander as Peter
- Claire Rommer as Anni
- Gyula Szőreghy as Annis Vater
- Margarete Kupfer as Annis Mutter
- Sig Arno as Doktor Planer
- Karl Platen as Diener
- Lissy Arna
