= Loo Hardy =

German actress (1898–1938)

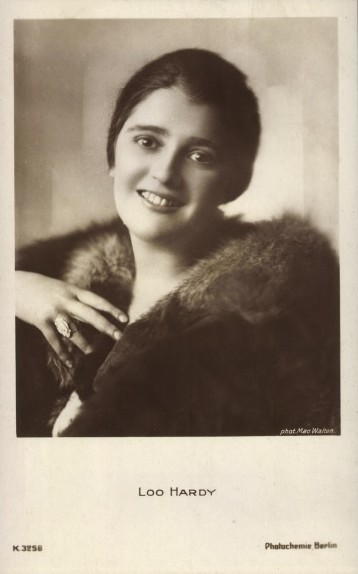
- Hardy c. 1918
- Born: Charlotte Noa; 11 January 1898; Berlin, German Empire
- Died: 23 April 1938 (aged 40); London, United Kingdom
- Other name: Charlotte Hardy
- Occupation: Film actress
- Years active: 1918 - 1931
- Relatives: Manfred Noa (brother)

Charlotte "Loo" Hardy (born Charlotte Noa; 11 January 1898 – 23 April 1938) was a German film actress of the silent era. She later emigrated to England, where she died by suicide from a narcotic overdose.

== Death ==
Noa's body was found in her flat in Cleveland Square, Paddington. An inquest was held on 26 April 1938, during which she was referred to as Mrs. Charlotte Levi. The Coroner found that she was overdrawn at the bank, behind on payments of rent, had received a final demand for income tax, and that tradesmen were refusing to supply goods unless for cash; and that she had killed herself by narcotic poisoning.

== Selected filmography ==
- The Clan (1920)
- Catherine the Great (1920)
- Wibbel the Tailor (1920)
- Berlin W. (1920)
- The Voice (1920)
- Jim Cowrey is Dead (1921)
- Raid (1921)
- The Story of a Maid (1921)
- Miss Beryll (1921)
- Yellow Star (1922)
- The Enchantress (1924)
- The Old Ballroom (1925)
- The Eighteen Year Old (1927)
- Road to Rio (1931)

== Bibliography ==
- Weniger, Kay. 'Es wird im Leben dir mehr genommen als gegeben ...' Lexikon der aus Deutschland und Österreich emigrierten Filmschaffenden 1933 bis 1945. ACABUS Verlag, 2011.
