= Marie Luise Droop =

German writer, director and producer

- Born: Marie Martha Luise Fritsch; 15 January 1890; Stettin
- Died: 22 August 1959 (aged 69); Lahr
- Other names: Marie Louise Droop; Ludwig Fritsch
- Occupation(s): writer, director, producer

Marie Luise Droop (15 January 1890 – 22 August 1959) was a German writer, director and producer.

== Biography ==
Marie Martha Luise Fritsch was born on 15 January 1890 in Stettin. Her father was Karl Georg Fritsch, manager of a cement factory, her mother Emmeline Albertine Elisabeth Conradine Most, from a wealthy family of chocolate manufacturers. As a child she admired Karl May and founded a Karl May fanclub. In 1903 she sent May a letter and became his close friend until his death in 1912.

She married Dr. Adolf Droop, a teacher who had written about May's work. Marie Luise Droop worked as an editor for Ullstein Verlag. During World War I, when her husband served in the army, she moved to Denmark where she worked for Nordisk Film. She returned to Germany after the war.

1920 She co-founded Ustad Film with the aim to produce Karl May adaptations. Ustad Film produced Die Teufelsanbeter, Auf den Trümmern des Paradieses and Die Todeskarawane until it went bankrupt. All three films are considered lost.

Marie Luise Droop wrote almost 50 screenplays for silent movies (three were adaptations of May's work) and, speaking nine languages, worked as a translator.

Marie Luise Droop died on 22 August 1959 in Lahr.

== Filmography ==
(incomplete)

Year	Original title	English title	Role	Notes
1918	Der siebente Kuß		writer	
1919	Das Lächeln der kleinen Beate		writer	
1919	Maharadjahens yndlingshustru II	The Maharaja's Favourite Wife II	writer	Nordisk Film
1920	Die Teufelsanbeter	The Devil Worshippers	writer, director	Ustad Film
1920	Auf den Trümmern des Paradieses	On the Brink of Paradise	writer, producer	Ustad Film
1920	Die Todeskarawane	Caravan of Death	writer, producer	Ustad Film
1920	Das Fest der schwarzen Tulpe	The Black Tulip Festival	director, writer	
1921	Die Lieblingsfrau des Maharadscha - 3. Teil	The Maharaja's Favourite Wife	writer	
1921	Ehrenschuld	A Debt of Honour	writer	
1922	Divankatzen		writer	
1922	Die Liebeslaube		writer	
1923	Das rollende Schicksal	The Wheels of Destiny	writer	
1924	Der Mann um Mitternacht	The Man at Midnight	writer	
1924	Um eines Weibes Ehre	To a Woman of Honour	writer	
1925	Die suchende Seele	The Searching Soul	writer	
1925	Aschermittwoch	Ash Wednesday	writer	
1925	Das alte Ballhaus	The Old Ballroom	writer	Film in two parts
1925	Die eiserne Braut	The Iron Bride	writer	
1925	Volk in Not – Ein Heldenlied von Tannenberg	People in Need	writer	
1926	Die Wiskottens	The Wiskottens	writer	
1926	In Treue stark	Eternal Allegiance	writer	
1926	Kampf der Geschlechter	Battle of the Sexes	writer	
1927	Die Tochter des Kunstreiters		writer	
1927	Deutsche Frauen - Deutsche Treue	German Women - German Faithfulness	writer	
1927	Stolzenfels am Rhein		writer	
1927	Steh' ich in finstrer Mitternacht	I Stand in the Dark Midnight	writer	
1927	Das Mädchen aus Frisco	The Girl from Frisco	writer	
1929	Was ist los mit Nanette?	What's Wrong with Nanette?	writer	
1929	Der Sittenrichter	The Customs Judge	writer	
1929	Morgenröte	Dawn	writer	credited as Ludwig Fritsch
1929	Mädchen am Kreuz	Crucified Girl	writer	
1930	Sturm auf drei Herzen		writer	credited as Ludwig Fritsch
1933	Drei blaue Jungs, ein blondes Mädel	Three Bluejackets and a Blonde	writer	
1934	Die Reiter von Deutsch-Ostafrika	The Riders of German East Africa	writer	
1936	Die Drei um Christine	The Three Around Christine	writer	
