= Potsdam (film) =

1927 film

- Scene from a film
- German: Potsdam, das Schicksal einer Residenz
- Directed by: Hans Behrendt
- Written by: Hans Behrendt; Joachim von Reitzenstein
- Produced by: Herman Millakowsky
- Starring: Christa Tordy; Hans Stüwe; Camilla von Hollay
- Cinematography: Mutz Greenbaum
- Production company: Greenbaum-Film
- Distributed by: Parufamet
- Release date: 19 January 1927
- Country: Germany
- Languages: Silent; German intertitles

Potsdam or Potsdam, the Fate of a Residence (German: Potsdam, das Schicksal einer Residenz) is a 1927 German silent drama film directed by Hans Behrendt and starring Christa Tordy, Hans Stüwe, and Camilla von Hollay.

The film's sets were designed by the art director Julius von Borsody.

== Cast ==
- Christa Tordy
- Hans Stüwe
- Camilla von Hollay
- Hermine Sterler
- Paul Otto
- Mathias Wieman
- Paul Bildt
- Henry Bender
- Antonie Jaeckel
- Otto Kronburger
