= The Glass Boat =

1927 film

- Directed by: Constantin J. David; Jacqueline Milliet
- Written by: René Bizet; Jacqueline Milliet; Ruth Goetz
- Starring: André Nox; Françoise Rosay; Eric Barclay
- Cinematography: Paul Guichard; Emil Schünemann
- Production company: Les Productions Milliet
- Distributed by: Deutsch-Nordische Film-Union (Germany)
- Release date: 1927
- Countries: France; Germany
- Languages: Silent; French intertitles

The Glass Boat (French: Le bateau de verre, German: Das brennende Schiff) is a 1927 French-German silent film directed by Constantin J. David and Jacqueline Milliet and starring André Nox, Françoise Rosay and Eric Barclay.

The film's sets were designed by the art director Karl Görge.

== Cast ==
- André Nox as Armand d'Arcy, Besitzer einer Glashütte
- Françoise Rosay as Frau d'Arcy, seine Gattin
- Eric Barclay as Robert d'Arcy, ihr Sohn
- Mary Kid as Violet Blanchard, eine junge Schloßherrin
- Käthe von Nagy as Anni
- Arthur Duarte as Allan, Ihr Bruder
- José Davert as Der Steuermann der 'Kerrock'
- Mathilde Sussin as Tante Marie
- Albert Paulig as Konsul Brown

== Bibliography ==
- Goble, Alan. The Complete Index to Literary Sources in Film. Walter de Gruyter, 1999.
