= Ash Wednesday (1931 film) =

1931 film directed by Johannes Meyer

- Directed by: Johannes Meyer
- Written by: Walter Schlee; Walter Wassermann
- Produced by: Gustav Althoff
- Starring: Karl Ludwig Diehl; Hans Stüwe; Claire Rommer
- Cinematography: Willy Hameister
- Music by: Willy Schmidt-Gentner
- Production company: Aco Film
- Distributed by: Omnium Film
- Release date: 28 January 1931
- Running time: 91 minutes
- Country: Germany
- Language: German

Ash Wednesday (German: Aschermittwoch) is a 1931 German drama film directed by Johannes Meyer and starring Karl Ludwig Diehl, Hans Stüwe and Claire Rommer. It was shot at the Grunewald Studios and Tempelhof Studios in Berlin and on location around the city. The film's sets were designed by the art director Willi Herrmann.

== Synopsis ==
In 1913 in Cologne during a carnival at the time of Ash Wednesday, Captain von Rochow encounters an old friend from his cadet days Lieutenant Georg von Linken. Georg, whose father is colonel of the regiment, embarks in an affair with the captain's flirtatious wife Yvette. Once this is exposed the harshness of military honour of the period demands that he commit suicide for the disgrace.

== Cast ==
- Karl Ludwig Diehl as Hauptmann von Rochow
- Hans Stüwe as Leutnant von Linken
- Claire Rommer as Yvette von Rochow
- Evelyn Holt as Hertha
- Hans Junkermann as Oberst von Linken
- Erna Morena as Mutter
- Lotte Spira as Majorin
- Ferdinand von Alten as Tiburtius
- Wolfgang Zilzer as Neufert
- Max Wilmsen as Jean
- Erich Kestin as Polke
- Melitta Klefer as Aenne

== Bibliography ==
- Waldman, Harry (2008). Nazi Films in America, 1933–1942. Jefferson, NC: McFarland. ISBN 978-0-7864-3861-7.
