= John Hopkins the Third =

1921 film

- Directed by: Wolfgang Neff
- Written by: Jane Bess
- Produced by: Liddy Hegewald
- Starring: Béla Lugosi
- Cinematography: Herrmann Saalfrank
- Distributed by: Dua Film; Hegewald Film
- Release date: 1921
- Country: Weimar Republic
- Language: Silent

John Hopkins the Third (German: Die verschwundene Million / The Missing Million) is a 1921 German film directed by Wolfgang Neff and featuring Béla Lugosi as the villain (a Western cowboy role). It was also known as Johann Hopkins III.

== Cast ==
In alphabetical order

- Curt Cappi – D. I. Winsor (credited as Curd Cappi)
- Sybill de Brée
- Fritz Falkenberg – Eddy Corvin
- Harry Frank – John Hopkins, the detective
- Frydel Fredy
- Béla Lugosi - as The Villain
- Ludwig Rex
- Preben J. Rist – W. R. Turner George Corvin
- Alfred Schmasow – Commissar Sam
- Lya Sellin – die schwarze Mary
- Heinrich von Korff – Mat Bliß

== See also ==
- Béla Lugosi filmography
