= The Old Ballroom =

1925 film

- Directed by: Wolfgang Neff
- Written by: Marie Luise Droop
- Produced by: Gustav Althoff
- Starring: Carl Auen; Olga Chekhova; Sybill Morel
- Cinematography: Emil Schünemann
- Music by: Paul Lincke
- Production companies: Althoff & Company
- Release dates: 25 September 1925 (Parts I & II)
- Country: Germany
- Languages: Silent; German intertitles

The Old Ballroom (German: Das alte Ballhaus) is a 1925 German silent drama film directed by Wolfgang Neff and starring Carl Auen, Olga Chekhova, and Sybill Morel. It was released in two parts, both of which premiered on the same day in Berlin.

The film sets were designed by the art director Franz Seemann.

== Cast ==
In alphabetical order

- Carl Auen
- Karl Beckersachs
- Fritz Beckmann
- Siegfried Berisch
- Carl Berndt
- Olga Chekhova (as Olga Tschechowa)
- Wilhelm Diegelmann
- Karl Harbacher
- Loo Hardy
- Hans Junkermann
- Paul Lincke
- Sybill Morel
- Paul Otto
- Heinrich Peer
- Hermann Picha
- Karl Victor Plagge
- Karl Platen
- Otto Reinwald
- Frida Richard
- Ernst Rückert
- Robert Steidl

== Bibliography ==
- Grange, William (2008). Cultural Chronicle of the Weimar Republic. Lanham, MD: Scarecrow Press. ISBN 978-0-8108-5967-8.
