= The Queen of Whitechapel =

1922 film

- Directed by: Wolfgang Neff
- Written by: Walter Wassermann
- Starring: Esther Carena; Hermann Vallentin; Claire Rommer
- Cinematography: Willi Briesemann
- Production company: Orplid-Film
- Release date: 1922
- Country: Germany
- Languages: Silent; German intertitles

The Queen of Whitechapel (German: Die Königin von Whitechapel) is a 1922 German silent film directed by Wolfgang Neff and starring Esther Carena, Hermann Vallentin, and Claire Rommer.

The film's sets were designed by the art director Franz Schroedter.

== Cast ==
- Esther Carena as Ninette
- Hermann Vallentin as Bertot
- Claire Rommer as Harriet Wolsey
- Marian Alma as Notar Graham
- Magnus Stifter as Harper
- Hugo Fischer-Köppe as Viscont Chalton
- Adele Hartwig as Parker
- Hermann Picha as Komiker
- Max Ruhbeck as Lord Wolsey

== Bibliography ==
- Hans-Michael Bock & Michael Töteberg. Das Ufa-Buch. Zweitausendeins, 1992.
