= The Man with the Limp =

1928 film

- Directed by: Willy Reiber; Franz Seitz
- Written by: Hermanna Barkhausen; Joseph Dalman; Peter Oldfield (novel)
- Starring: Christa Tordy; Alfred Abel; Carmen Cartellieri
- Cinematography: Willy Winterstein
- Production company: Münchner Lichtspielkunst
- Distributed by: Bavaria Film
- Release date: 4 January 1928
- Country: Germany
- Languages: Silent; German intertitles

The Man with the Limp (German:Das Geheimnis von Genf) is a 1928 German silent film directed by Willy Reiber and Franz Seitz and starring Christa Tordy, Alfred Abel and Carmen Cartellieri.

The film's art direction was by Ludwig Reiber. It was made at the Emelka Studios in Munich.

== Cast ==
- Christa Tordy as Betty Marshall, amerikanische Journalistin
- Alfred Abel as Baron Enderny, ein Journalist / Varenne, der Lahme
- Carmen Cartellieri as Madame Pique
- Eric Barclay as René
- Bert Bloem as John Lavington, Sekretär des Völkerbunds
- Luigi Serventi as McHenning, Völkerbund-Delegierter
- Ernst Reicher as Mons. Durand - Chef der Genfer Polizei
- Georg Henrich as Graf Firbach, Minister von Nordland
- Rolf Pinegger as Herr von Wächter, sein Sekretär
- Olly Orska
- Max Weydner
- Wilhelm Stauffen
- Julius Riedmueller
- August Weigert

== Bibliography ==
- Bock, Hans-Michael & Bergfelder, Tim. The Concise CineGraph. Encyclopedia of German Cinema. Berghahn Books, 2009.
