= Der Grüne Wagen =

German-language theatre group

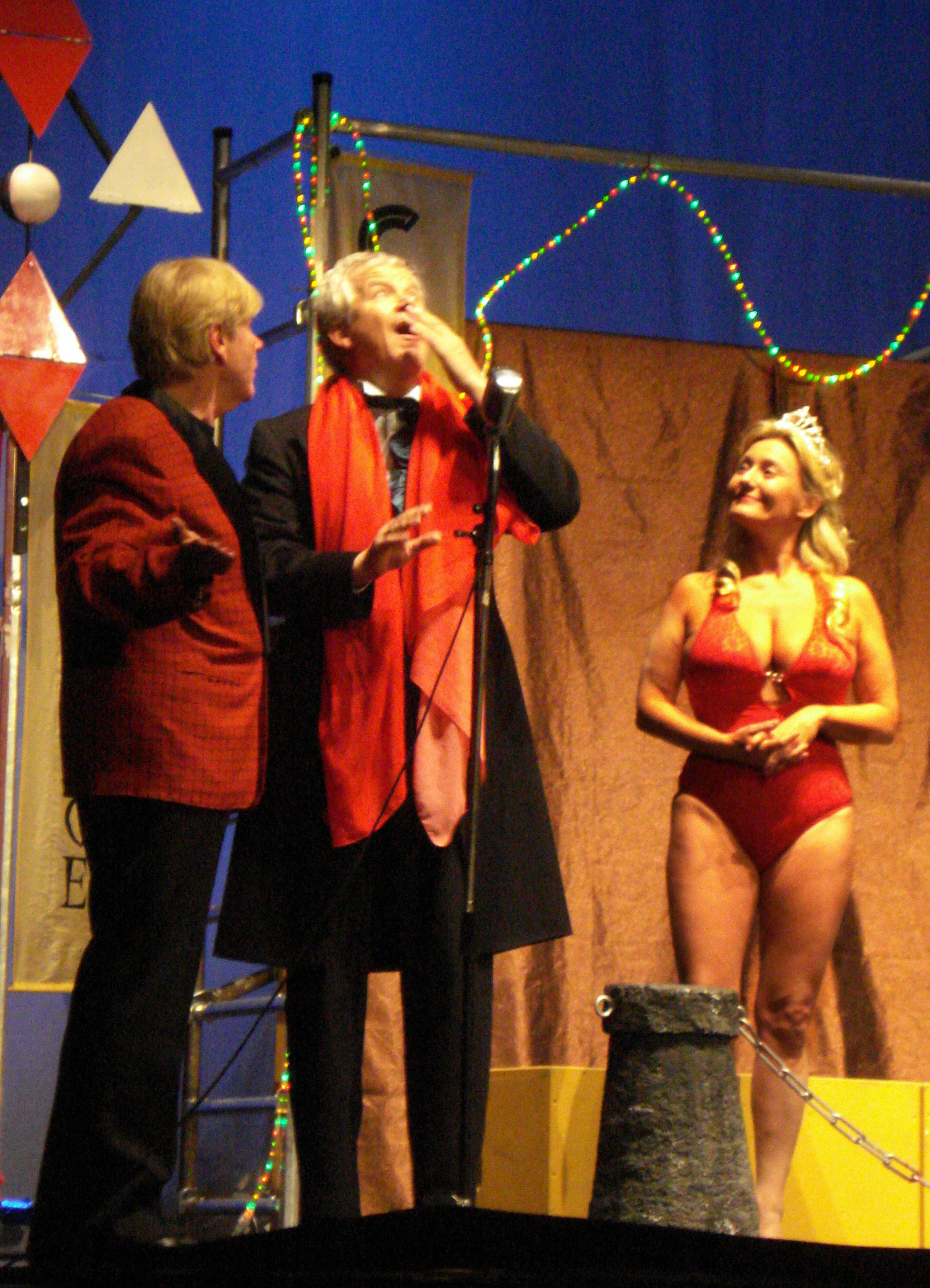
Thomas Stroux in Wir sind noch einmal davongekommen, Wels, September 2008

Der Grüne Wagen (The Green Car) is a German language theatre group, originally based in Germany but since 1983 based in Austria. It is the oldest German-language touring theatre of the post-war period.

== Germany (1953–1983) ==
The theater company was founded by Alexander E. Franke and, along with the Neue Schaubühne in Munich, is the oldest German-speaking touring company of the post-World War II period. Alexander E. Franke founded the Grünen Wagens in Erlangen in 1953. Later directors were William Dieterle, Otto Ander, Jürgen Wilke and most recently Thomas Stroux.

Heinz Hilpert directed Der Grüne Wagen in a long-planned performance of Ödön von Horváth's Himmelwärts in 1955. In 1958 Oskar Werner played in a production of Hamlet with Der Grüne Wagen in a tour of Germany and Austria. The screenwriter, dramaturge and translator Horst Budjuhn adapted the 1954 American film Twelve Angry Men for the stage. Its world premier was at the Munich Kammerspiele, directed by Hans Schweikart and performed by Der Grüne Wagen. In the 1959/1960 it was the most popular play in German-speaking theaters. Louis V. Arco (1899-1975) performed in Der Grüne Wagen in the 1964/1965 season.

In 1965 Der Grüne Wagen was acquired by Hollywood film director William Dieterle, then based in Taufkirchen near Munich, which he ran together with his wife, Charlotte Hagenbruch. After his wife's death in May 1968, he ran the theatre with his new wife, Elisabeth Daum, as a touring theatre. Dieterle directed the ensemble for several years, with the great Elisabeth Bergner as his leading lady. Bergner toured with Der Grüne Wagen several times through Germany, Austria and the Netherlands. In October 1964 she starred as "Aurélie" in Die Irre von Chaillot by Jean Giraudoux at the Düsseldorfer Schauspielhaus, then took the play on tour with Der grüne Wagen.

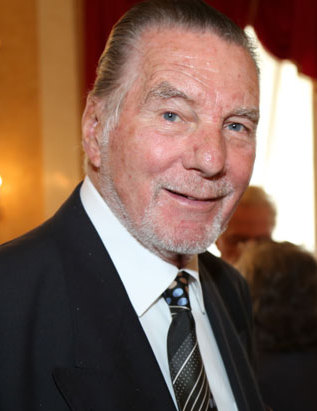
Jürgen Wilke in 2013

== Austria (1983 to present) ==
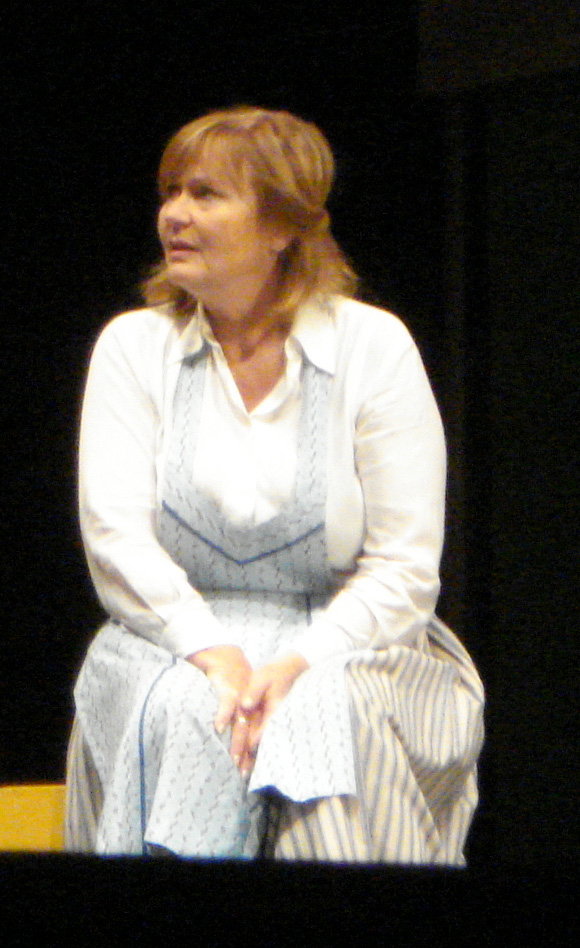
Johanna Liebeneiner in Thornton Wilders "Wir sind noch einmal davongekommen", Wels, September 2008, a production of "Der Grüne Wagen"

Dieterle was succeeded by the Viennese theater director Otto Ander. Otto Ander and his partner Jürgen Wilke moved Der grüne Wagen to Vienna in 1983. From 1989 Wilke ran the theatre on his own, taking the ensemble on extensive tours through Austria, Germany and Switzerland. Actors who played under Wilke included Nadja Tiller, Gisela Uhlen, Gusti Wolf, Joachim Hansen, Raimund Harmstorf, Frank Hoffmann, Sieghardt Rupp, Heinrich Schweiger and Klausjürgen Wussow.

From the 2005/2006 season, Thomas Stroux took over direction of Der Grüne Wagen. One of the venues of the theatre is the Tournee Theater Thomas Stroux in Vienna.

== Notable people ==
Over the years, around 100 productions have been staged. Important directors include Werner Düggelin, Heinz Hilpert, Wolfgang Liebeneiner, Gustav Manker and Rudolf Noelte. Prominent actors include Hans Clarin, Theo Lingen, Karl Paryla, Elisabeth Bergner and Marianne Hoppe.

The ensemble made several TV movies, including Der Gärtner von Toulouse (1962) directed by Werner Düggelin and starring Gertrud Kückelmann, Gisela Uhlen and Bum Krüger, Die Rivalin (1968) directed by Wolfgang Liebeneiner and starring Hilde Krahl, Gerlinde Locker and Friedrich Schoenfelder, and Der Kreidegarten (1973) starring Ida Ehre, Jochen Schmidt, Ellen Schwiers and Marina Ried.

== Productions since 2005 ==
- 2005/06: Lysistrata by Aristophanes with Johanna Liebeneiner. Staged again in 2010.
- 2005/06: Die Irre von Chaillot (The madwoman of Chaillot). Work in two acts by Jean Giraudoux with Vera Oelschlegel
- 2006/07: Komödie im Dunkeln (Comedy in the Dark) by Peter Shaffer
- 2007/08: Bunbury by Oscar Wilde
- 2008/09: Wir sind noch einmal davongekommen (We got away with it again) by Thornton Wilder
- 2009/10: Heiraten ist immer ein Risiko (Getting married is always a risk) by Saul O´Hara with Dietz-Werner Steck
- 2010/11: Mary, Mary – Nie wieder Mary (Mary, Mary - Never again Mary) by Jean Kerr
- 2011/12: Leonce und Lena by Georg Büchner
- 2012/13: Das Gespenst von Canterville (The Canterville Ghost). Comedy by Susanne Wolf based on a story by Oscar Wilde
- 2013/14: Der Quereinsteiger (The career changer). Comedy by Sylvia Hoffman (world premiere)
