= Ash Wednesday (1925 film) =

1925 film directed by Wolfgang Neff

- Directed by: Wolfgang Neff
- Written by: Marie Luise Droop
- Produced by: Gustav Althoff
- Starring: Bernd Aldor; Sybill Morel; Claire Rommer
- Cinematography: Willy Goldberger
- Production company: Aafa Film
- Distributed by: Aafa Film
- Release date: 6 February 1925
- Running time: 108 minutes
- Country: Germany
- Languages: Silent; German intertitles

Ash Wednesday (German: Aschermittwoch) is a 1925 German silent drama film directed by Wolfgang Neff and starring Bernd Aldor, Sybill Morel, and Claire Rommer. The film's sets were designed by the art director Fritz Kraenke.

== Cast ==
- Bernd Aldor as Fabrikbesitzer Dumont
- Sybill Morel as Agathe
- Karl Beckersachs as Leutnant
- Claire Rommer as Jutta
- Eduard von Winterstein as Oberst
- Ernst Rückert as Großindustrieller
- Adele Sandrock as Tante Guste
- Wilhelm Diegelmann as Feldwebel
- Ernst Pittschau
- Ludwig Rex
- Siegfried Berisch
- Carl Auen a Leutnant der Reserve
- Hugo Fischer-Köppe
- Lia Eibenschütz as Thea
- Olga Engl as Frau Oberst

== Bibliography ==
- Grange, William (2008). Cultural Chronicle of the Weimar Republic. Lanham, MD: Scarecrow Press. ISBN 978-0-8108-5967-8.
