= Marie Antoinette, the Love of a King =

1922 film directed by Rudolf Meinert

- German film poster
- German: Marie Antoinette – Das Leben einer Königin
- Directed by: Rudolf Meinert
- Written by: Rudolf Meinert
- Produced by: Rudolf Meinert
- Starring: Diana Karenne; Maria Reisenhofer; Gustav May; Ludwig Hartau
- Cinematography: Max Fassbender; Ernest Plhak
- Production company: Meinert Film
- Release date: 27 October 1922
- Running time: 137 minutes
- Country: Weimar Republic
- Languages: Silent; German intertitles

Marie Antoinette, the Love of a King (German: Marie Antoinette – Das Leben einer Königin) is a 1922 German silent historical drama film directed by Rudolf Meinert and starring Diana Karenne, Maria Reisenhofer and Gustav May. The film depicts the life of Marie Antoinette, Queen of France, during the years leading up to and during the French Revolution in which she was executed.

== Plot ==
Marie Antoinette's life story during the French Revolution.

== Cast ==
- Diana Karenne as Marie Antoinette
- Maria Reisenhofer as Maria Theresa
- Gustav May as Joseph II
- Ludwig Hartau as Louis XV.
- Viktor Schwanneke as Louis XVI
- Ernst Hofmann as Artois
- Uschi Elleot as Lamballe
- Lia Eibenschütz as Countess Polignac
- Olga Limburg as de la Motte
- Eugen Burg as Count de la Motte
- Erich Kaiser-Titz as Cardinal Rohan
- Heinrich Schroth as Count Orleans
- Georg H. Schnell as Lafayette
- Hermann Vallentin as Mirabeau
- Georg John as Maximilien Robespierre
- Max Grünberg as Jean-Paul Marat
- Ernst Pia as Dr. Guillotin
- William Dieterle as Drouet
- Henry Bender as Finance Minister
- Edmund Löwe as Hue
- Rudolf Klein-Rhoden as Böhmer
- Emil Stammer as Abt Vermont
- Hans Oberg as Simon

== Bibliography ==
- Vacche, Angela Dalle. Diva: Defiance and Passion in Early Italian Cinema. University of Texas Press, 2008.
