= Love on Skis =

1928 film

- Directed by: Rolf Randolf
- Written by: Hermanna Barkhausen
- Starring: Harry Liedtke; Rita Roberts; Georg Henrich
- Cinematography: Franz Koch
- Production company: Phoebus-Film
- Distributed by: Phoebus-Film
- Release date: 10 April 1928
- Running time: 100 minutes
- Country: Germany
- Languages: Silent; German intertitles

Love on Skis (German: Amor auf Ski) is a 1928 German silent comedy film directed by Rolf Randolf and starring Harry Liedtke, Rita Roberts and Georg Henrich. It was shot at the Bavaria Studios in Munich and on location in the Alps. The film's sets were designed by the art director Ludwig Reiber.

The film, in which Christa Tordy acted with her husband Harry Liedtke, was her final screen appearance.

== Cast ==
- Harry Liedtke as Erbprinz Heinrich von Altenberg-Gauda
- Rita Roberts as Prinzessin Bettina
- Georg Henrich as Dr. Brinkamm
- Christa Tordy as Elli, seine Tochter
- Lydia Potechina as Rosalinde, seine Schwester
- Willi Forst as Paul Grumbach, Ellis Vetter
- Franz Loskarn as Huber Sepp, Bergführer
- Sylvester Bauriedl as Moritz Bolle, Molkereibesitzer
- Elisabeth Pinajeff as Ida, Ellis Freundin
- Rio Nobile as Graf von Golz

== Bibliography ==
- Francesco Bono. Willi Forst: ein filmkritisches Porträt. 2010. ISBN 978-3869160542
