= The Shadow of the Mosque =

1923 film

- Directed by: Walter R. Hall
- Written by: Walter R. Hall
- Produced by: John Hagenbeck
- Starring: Stewart Rome
- Cinematography: Willy Großstück; Willy Hameister
- Production company: John Hagenbeck-Film
- Release date: 30 November 1923
- Country: Germany
- Languages: Silent; German intertitles

The Shadow of the Mosque (German:Im Schatten der Moschee) is a 1923 German silent film directed by Walter R. Hall and starring Stewart Rome.

The film's art direction was by Franz Schroedter and Curt Wiese

== Cast ==
In alphabetical order

- Lys Andersen
- Dora Bergner
- Esther Carena
- Edmund Löwe
- Stewart Rome
- Aruth Wartan

== Bibliography ==
- Grange, William. Cultural Chronicle of the Weimar Republic. Scarecrow Press, 2008.
