= Nat Pinkerton in the Fight =

1920 film

- Directed by: Wolfgang Neff
- Written by: Jane Bess
- Starring: Bela Lugosi; Olaf Storm; Sybill de Brée
- Cinematography: Herrmann Saalfrank
- Distributed by: Dua Film
- Release date: 7 August 1920
- Country: Weimar Republic
- Language: Silent

Nat Pinkerton in the Fight (German: Nat Pinkerton im Kampf) is a 1920 German film directed by Wolfgang Neff and featuring Béla Lugosi. The film was released in two parts, Das Ende des Artisten Bartolini (The End of the Artist Bartolini) (1920) and Diebesfallen (Booby Trap) (1921).

Nat Pinkerton was a character which appeared in the German dime novel Nat Pinkerton, der König der Detectivs published between 1907 and 1915. It was a detective series and was highly popular in Europe in the 1910s and the 1920s.

== Cast ==
- Olaf Storm
- Sybill de Brée
- Bela Lugosi – as Gang Leader
- Eduard van Meghan
- Joe Nestor-Pridum
- Marian Alma

== See also ==
- Béla Lugosi filmography
