= The Alternative Bride =

1925 film directed by Carl Wilhelm

- Directed by: Carl Wilhelm
- Written by: Richard Arvay; Robert Garai
- Produced by: Willy Zeunert
- Starring: Ida Wüst; Bruno Kastner; Paul Heidemann
- Cinematography: Eduard von Borsody
- Music by: Willy Schmidt-Gentner
- Production company: Phoebus-Film
- Distributed by: Phoebus-Film
- Release date: 12 October 1925
- Country: Germany
- Languages: Silent; German intertitles

The Alternative Bride (German: Die vertauschte Braut) is a 1925 German silent film directed by Carl Wilhelm and starring Ida Wüst, Bruno Kastner, and Paul Heidemann.

The film's art direction was by Alfred Junge and Fritz Maurischat.

== Cast ==
- Ida Wüst as Mama Marrison
- Bruno Kastner as Percy
- Paul Heidemann as Ralph
- Diomira Jacobini as Lilian
- Uschi Elleot as Gladys
- Sig Arno as Ganeffi
- Oreste Bilancia
- Jonny Cox
- Robert Garrison
- Vivian Gibson
- Harry Halm
- Karl Harbacher
- Hermann Picha
- Gyula Szőreghy
- Siegfried Tittert

== Bibliography ==
- Grange, William (2008). Cultural Chronicle of the Weimar Republic. Lanham, MD: Scarecrow Press. ISBN 978-0-8108-5967-8.
