= Sybill Morel =

German actress

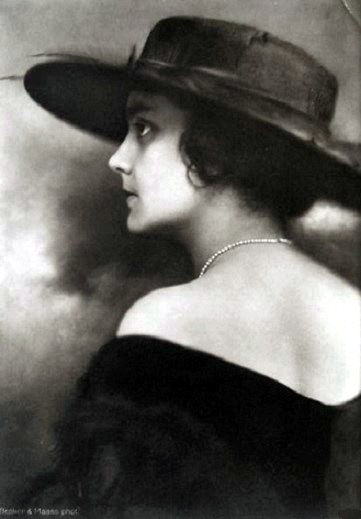
- Born: 16 February 1899; Mannheim, German Empire
- Occupation: Actress
- Years active: 1919–1930 (film)

Sybill Morel (February 16, 1899 – ?) was a German stage and film actress of the silent era.

== Selected filmography ==
- The Geisha and the Samurai (1919)
- Opium (1919)
- The Tragedy of a Great (1920)
- Three Nights (1920)
- The Story of Christine von Herre (1921)
- On the Red Cliff (1922)
- Only One Night (1922)
- The Violin King (1923)
- The Affair of Baroness Orlovska (1923)
- Maciste and the Chinese Chest (1923)
- The Vice of Gambling (1923)
- Harry Hill's Deadly Hunt (1925)
- Ash Wednesday (1925)
- The Old Ballroom (1925)
- The Fallen (1926)
- The Awakening of Woman (1927)
- The Holy Lie (1927)
- When the Mother and the Daughter (1928)
- Under the Lantern (1928)
- The Old Fritz (1928)
- Madame Lu (1929)
- Angel in Séparée (1929)
- Storm of Love (1929)

== Bibliography ==
- Goble, Alan (1999). The Complete Index to Literary Sources in Film. Berlin: Walter de Gruyter. ISBN 978-3-11-095194-3.
