= Jutta Jol =

German actress (1896–1981)

- Born: Justine Jutta Blanda Hermine Gehrmann; February 4, 18964 February 1896; Metz, Lothringen, German Reich
- Died: October 26, 1981 (aged 85); Berlin, Germany
- Occupation: Actress

Jutta Jol (4 February 1896 – 26 October 1981) was a German actress.

Born Justine Jutta Blanda Hermine Gehrmann in Metz, Lothringen German Reich (now, Lorraine, France), she died in Berlin.

== Selected filmography ==
- Lord Reginald's Derby Ride (1924)
- Rosenmontag (1924)
- Vacation from Marriage (1927)
- The Serfs (1928)
- Whirl of Youth (1928)
- The Smuggler's Bride of Mallorca (1929)
- Wellen der Leidenschaft (1930)
- When the Village Music Plays on Sunday Nights (1933)
- Regine (1935)
- The Yellow Flag (1937)
- Mädchen für alles (1937)
- The Divine Jetta (1937)
- The Tiger of Eschnapur (1938)
- The Indian Tomb (1938)
