= Prinz Louis Ferdinand =

1927 German silent film by Hans Behrendt

- Theatrical poster of the film's release in Austria
- Directed by: Hans Behrendt
- Written by: Henry Koster; Otz Tollen
- Produced by: Eugen Kürschner
- Starring: Kurt Junker; Christa Tordy; Hans Stüwe; Jenny Jugo
- Cinematography: Carl Drews
- Music by: Willy Schmidt-Gentner
- Production company: Phoebus Film
- Distributed by: Phoebus Film
- Release date: 21 March 1927
- Running time: 99 minutes
- Country: Germany
- Languages: Silent; German intertitles

Prinz Louis Ferdinand is a 1927 German silent historical drama film directed by Hans Behrendt and starring Kurt Junker, Christa Tordy, Hans Stüwe and Jenny Jugo. It was partly filmed at the EFA Studios in Berlin. The film's sets were designed by the art director Erich Zander. It was based on the life of Prince Louis Ferdinand of Prussia (1772–1806) and was part of the series of Prussian films made during Weimar Germany.

In Austria, it was released as Bonaparte vor dem Rhein.

== Cast ==
- Kurt Junker as Friedrich Wilhelm III
- Christa Tordy as Queen Louise
- Hans Stüwe as Louis Ferdinand
- Jenny Jugo as Pauline Wiesel
- Kenneth Rieve as Prince Wilhelm
- Paul Bildt as War Council Wiesel
- Arthur Kraußneck as Bißchér
- Eduard von Winterstein as Scharnhorst
- Heinz Marlow as Ginzelmann
- Heinrich Schroth as Yorck
- Hermine Sterler as Rahel Lewis
- Theodor Loos as Ernst Moritz Arndt
- Heinz Hilpert as Johann Gottlieb Fichte
- Max Gülstorff as first editor of the Vossische Zeitung
- John Gottowt as second editor of the Vossische Zeitung
- Ernst Gronau as third editor of the Vossische Zeitung
