= German Women – German Faithfulness =

1927 German silent film

- Directed by: Wolfgang Neff
- Written by: Marie Luise Droop; Arthur Irrgang
- Produced by: Liddy Hegewald
- Starring: Eugen Neufeld; Philipp Manning; Helga Thomas
- Cinematography: Eduard Hoesch
- Production company: Hegewald Film
- Distributed by: Hegewald Film
- Release date: 2 February 1927
- Country: Germany
- Language: Silent German intertitles

German Women – German Faithfulness (German: Deutsche Frauen – Deutsche Treue) is a 1927 German silent drama film directed by Wolfgang Neff and starring Eugen Neufeld, Philipp Manning and Helga Thomas. Its title is taken from the first line of the second verse of the German national anthem.

The film's sets were designed by Artur Günther.

== Cast ==
- Eugen Neufeld as Colonel Wolfram
- Philipp Manning as Major Stürmer
- Helga Thomas as Gisela, his daughter
- Hermine Sterler as Regine Vollrath
- Carl Walther Meyer as Lieutenant Günther Vollrath, her son
- Geza L. Weiss as Emil, his batman
- Sophie Pagay as Marie, housekeeper at Regine
- Fritz Kampers as Max Hühnerbein, musketeer
- Hermann Picha as Heinrich Taube, innkeeper
- Lydia Potechina as Mrs Taube
- Gottfried Hagedorn as a German staff surgeon
- Ferdinand von Alten as Vaughan, French staff surgeon
- Adele Sandrock as Madame Viard
- Solveig Hedengran as Marcelle, her grandchild

== Bibliography ==
- Michael A. Loveless, Weimar Cinema: A Memorial to the Great War. 2005. Proquest, ISBN 9781243020864
