= Torments of the Night =

1926 film

- Directed by: Curtis Bernhardt
- Written by: Curtis Bernhardt; Carl Zuckmayer
- Starring: Claire Rommer; Ernö Verebes; William Dieterle
- Production company: Ikarus-Film
- Distributed by: Deutsche Fox
- Release date: 23 April 1926
- Running time: 72 minutes
- Country: Germany
- Languages: Silent; German intertitles

Torments of the Night (German: Qualen der Nacht) is a 1926 German silent drama film directed by Curtis Bernhardt and starring Claire Rommer, Ernö Verebes and William Dieterle. It was distributed by the German subsidiary of the American company Fox Film.

== Cast ==
- Claire Rommer as Minnie Hinrichsen
- Ernö Verebes as Kurt Elversam
- William Dieterle as Jap Geel
- Fritz Rasp as Kellner
- Alexander Granach as Murphy
- Margarete Kupfer
- Hermann Vallentin

== Bibliography ==
- Hans-Michael Bock and Tim Bergfelder. The Concise Cinegraph: An Encyclopedia of German Cinema. Berghahn Books.
