= Yellow Star (film) =

1922 film

- Directed by: Wolfgang Neff
- Written by: Jane Bess
- Starring: Uschi Elleot; Robert Scholz; Fritz Kampers
- Production company: Ima-Film
- Distributed by: Caesar Film
- Release date: 27 January 1922
- Country: Germany
- Languages: Silent; German intertitles

Yellow Star (German: Gelbstern) is a 1922 German silent drama film directed by Wolfgang Neff and starring Uschi Elleot, Robert Scholz and Fritz Kampers.

== Cast ==
- Uschi Elleot as Konfektioneuse
- Loo Hardy
- Robert Scholz as Charles Beulancon
- Margarete Schaup
- Frederic Brunn
- Walter Liedtke
- Rudolf Hilberg
- Fritz Kampers

== Bibliography ==
- Grange, William. Cultural Chronicle of the Weimar Republic. Scarecrow Press, 2008.
