= Maria Reisenhofer =

Austrian actress

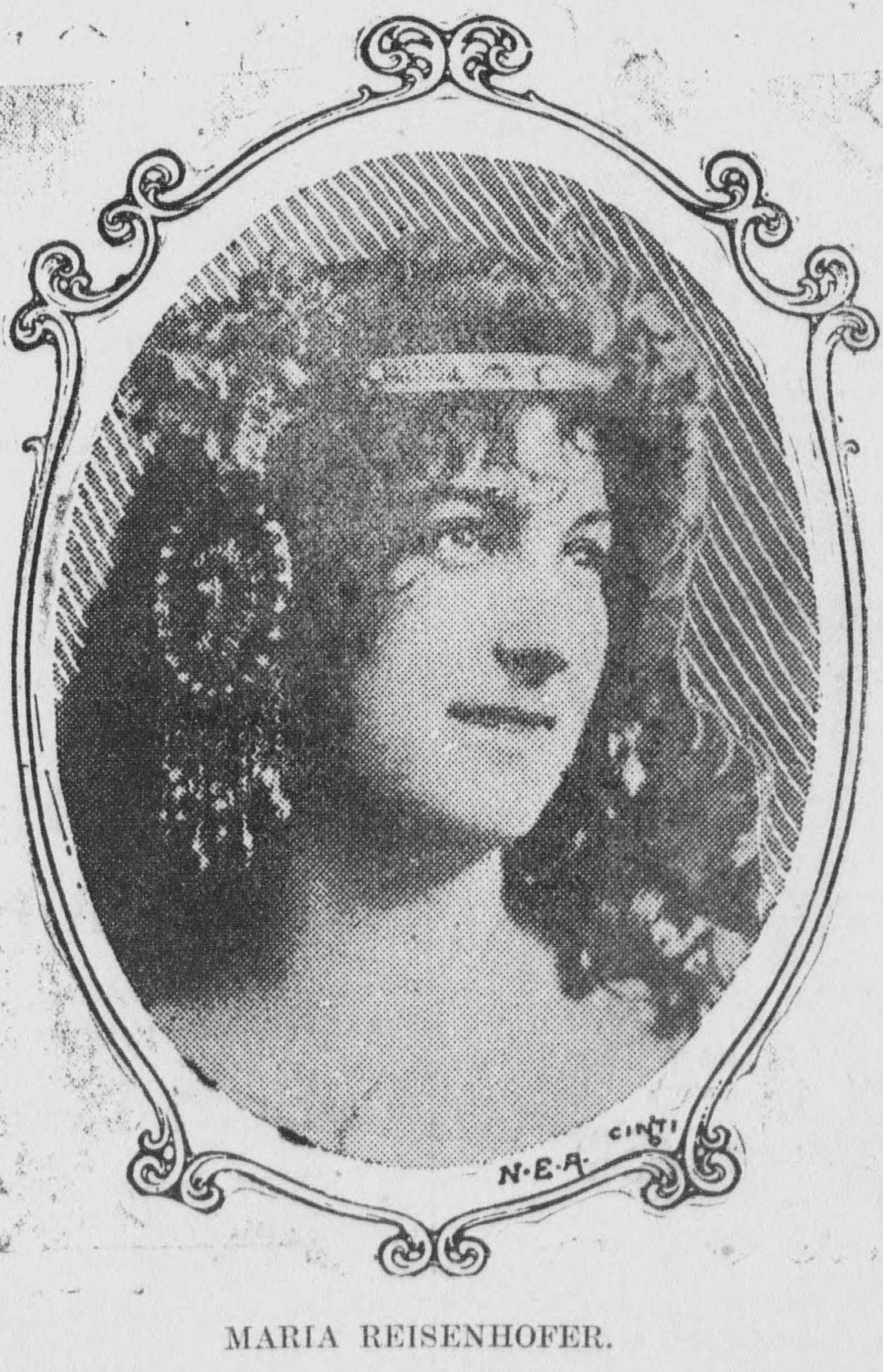
Maria Reisenhofer in 1904.

Maria Reisenhofer (31 December 1869, Graz – 18 April 1947, Berlin) was an Austrian stage and film actress.

== Selected filmography ==
- Anna Boleyn (1920)
- Christian Wahnschaffe (1920)
- Marie Antoinette, the Love of a King (1922)
- The Girl with the Mask (1922)
- The Love Story of Cesare Ubaldi (1922)
- His Wife, The Unknown (1923)
- Rosenmontag (1924)
- Fire of Love (1925)
- The Love Trap (1925)
- Young Blood (1926)
- The Long Intermission (1927)
- Regine (1927)
- The Serfs (1928)
- Only on the Rhine (1930)
- The Page from the Dalmasse Hotel (1933)
- The Private Life of Louis XIV (1935)
- The Life and Loves of Tschaikovsky (1939)

== Bibliography ==
- Poague, Leland A. The cinema of Ernst Lubitsch. A. S. Barnes, 1978.
