= Jim Cowrey Is Dead =

1921 film

Jim Cowrey is Dead
- Directed by: Edmond Gottschalk Stratton
- Written by: Thomas Henry
- Starring: Hedda Vernon; Otto Flint; Loo Hardy; Gertrude Welcker
- Production company: Femina Film
- Release date: 12 July 1921
- Country: Germany
- Languages: Silent; German intertitles

Jim Cowrey is Dead (German: Jim Corwey ist tot) is a 1921 German silent drama film directed by Edmond Gottschalk Stratton and starring Hedda Vernon, Otto Flint and Loo Hardy. It premiered at the Marmorhaus in Berlin on 12 July 1921.

== Cast ==
- Hedda Vernon
- Otto Flint
- Loo Hardy
- Gertrude Welcker
- Heinrich Schroth
- Fritz Schulz
- Giuseppe Spalla

== Bibliography ==
- Grange, William. Cultural Chronicle of the Weimar Republic.Scarecrow Press, 2008.
