= His Toughest Case =

1926 film directed by Fritz Wendhausen

- Directed by: Fritz Wendhausen
- Written by: Wilhelm Thiele; Fritz Wendhausen
- Produced by: Erich Pommer
- Starring: Alexander Murski; Christa Tordy; Olga Chekhova
- Cinematography: Werner Brandes
- Music by: Werner R. Heymann
- Production company: UFA
- Distributed by: UFA
- Release date: 30 September 1926
- Country: Germany
- Languages: Silent; German intertitles

His Toughest Case (German: Sein großer Fall) is a 1926 German silent crime film directed and co-written by Fritz Wendhausen and starring Alexander Murski, Christa Tordy and Olga Chekhova. It was shot at the Babelsberg Studios in Berlin. The film's art direction was by Hans Jacoby. It premiered at the Ufa-Palast am Zoo.

== Cast ==
- Alexander Murski as Lord Malcom
- Christa Tordy as Aileen, Seine Tochter
- Olga Chekhova as Mary Melton
- Rudolf Forster as Francis Broon
- Carl Ebert as Kriminalkommissar Bernhard
- Andreas Behrens-Klausen as Kriminalkommissar Schlosser
- Hans Adalbert Schlettow as Steppke, alias Graf Strachowsky
- Wilhelm Bendow as Kulicke, Liebhaber-Detektiv
- Emil Heyse as Goetzke
- Nikolai Malikoff as Simon Broon, Francis' Vater

== Bibliography ==
- Grange, William. Cultural Chronicle of the Weimar Republic. Scarecrow Press, 2008. ISBN 9780810859678
- Jacobsen, Wolfgang. Babelsberg: ein Filmstudio 1912-1992. Argon, 1992. ISBN 978-3870242039
