= Wolfgang Neff =

Austrian film director (1875–1939)

- Born: Wolfgang Bruna; 8 September 1875; Prague, Bohemia, Austria-Hungary (now Czech Republic)
- Died: 10 June 1939 (aged 63)
- Other names: Wolfgang Brunner; Wolfgang Nefeles
- Occupation: Film director
- Years active: 1920-1930

Wolfgang Neff (8 September 1875 – 10 June 1939) was an Austrian film director. He directed 50 films between 1920 and 1930. He was born in Prague, Bohemia, Austria-Hungary (now Czech Republic).

In January 1922, Nadf founded Work-Film GmbH (1922–1925), and in October 1923, he became the sole owner of India-Film GmbH (1923–1929). His mountain film, The Death Road on the Bernina, was the last German silent film released in 1931. As the popularity of silent film declined from the advent of sound cinema, he no longer received directing opportunities.

== Selected filmography ==
- Nat Pinkerton im Kampf (1920)
- Die verschwundene Million (1921)
- Raid (1921)
- The Queen of Whitechapel (1922)
- Fratricide (1922)
- The Marriage Swindler (1922)
- The Cigarette Countess (1922)
- Yellow Star (1922)
- The Woman from the Orient (1923)
- The Heart of Lilian Thorland (1924)
- The Old Ballroom (1925)
- The Salesgirl from the Fashion Store (1925)
- People in Need (1925)
- Ash Wednesday (1925)
- German Women - German Faithfulness (1927)
- The Harbour Bride (1927)
- The Girl from Frisco (1927)
- The Lorelei (1927)
- Circus Renz (1927)
- Who Invented Divorce? (1928)
- Dawn (1929)
