= The Man in the Fire =

1926 film

- American release poster
- Der Mann im Feuer
- Directed by: Erich Waschneck
- Written by: Heinrich Brandt; Curt J. Braun; Armin Petersen; Erich Waschneck
- Produced by: Erich Pommer
- Starring: Helga Thomas; Olga Chekhova; Henry Stuart
- Cinematography: Friedl Behn-Grund; Werner Brandes
- Music by: Werner R. Heymann
- Production company: UFA
- Distributed by: UFA
- Release date: 23 September 1926
- Running time: 89 minutes
- Country: Germany
- Languages: Silent; German intertitles

The Man in the Fire (German: Der Mann im Feuer) is a 1926 German silent film directed by Erich Waschneck and starring Helga Thomas, Olga Chekhova and Henry Stuart. It was shot at the Weissensee Studios in Berlin. The film's sets were designed by Botho Hoefer. It was released in the United States under the alternative title of When Duty Calls.

== Plot ==
Berlin in the 1920s: a collision occurs between two trains on the capital's subway. Johann Michael, a seasoned firefighter through and through, is among those actively involved in the rescue efforts. He sustains a severe knee injury that leaves him permanently stiff, preventing him from continuing his field service. Michael refuses a desk job offered to him. Secretly, the now-retired firefighter blames his much younger colleague, Hellmuth Frank, for his predicament. This fire chief, of all people, has been in love with Michael's daughter Lore, a costume designer at Berlin's Scala Theatre, ever since he was once required to conduct a safety inspection there.

Johann Michael has found a monotonous assembly line job, which leaves him utterly unfulfilled and makes him increasingly grumpy. Lore asks Hellmuth to help her father at least pass a driving licence exam for the fire department, but the old man fails. Once again, old Michael believes that Hellmuth Frank must be behind his downfall—a misconception reinforced by Karl Winter, the Scala's head lighting technician, who himself has his eye on Lore and has thus become Hellmuth Frank's rival.

One day, disaster strikes when the Scala Theatre catches fire: a short circuit during a performance soon erupts into a sea of flames. The fire department rushes to the scene, and Johann Michael cannot bear to stay home after hearing the terrible news. It soon becomes clear that Lore is still inside the theatre. While Karl Winter simply vanishes, Johann Michael and Hellmuth Frank work together to rescue Lore from the inferno. When Hellmuth collapses in the heat, Johann Michael saves not only his daughter but also his supposed enemy, Frank. Johann Michael and Helmuth Frank shake hands heartily, and Frank embraces Lore.

== Cast ==
- Rudolf Rittner as firefighter Johann Michael
- Helga Thomas as his daughter, Lore Michael
- Olga Chekhova as Mlle Romola
- Henry Stuart as Hellmuth Frank
- Kurt Vespermann as Karl Winter
- Jakob Tiedtke as the friend of Mlle Romola

== Production ==
The Man in the Fire was filmed between April and June 1926 in Berlin-Weißensee and at the UFA cultural department in Berlin-Steglitz. It passed the film censors on 6 September 6 of the same year and premiered on 23 September 1926, at the UFA-Palast am Zoo cinema in Berlin. The five-act film, approved for young audiences, ran for 2,253 metres and was deemed "educational".

The sets were designed by Botho Höfer.

In Halle/Saale, the Capitol cinema, located at Lauchstädter Straße 1, screened a performance of The Man in the Fire, with the announcement that it featured "Rudolf Rittner, Helga Thomas, Olga Tschechowa, and Henry Stuart. The Berlin Fire Department also participated."

== Critical assessment ==
Linzer Tages-Post wrote: "Rudolf Rittner portrays the firefighter with gripping realism. The quick thinking of the Berlin fire brigades in the depiction of the great fire is admirable. […] It is once again a truly German film."

Das Kino-Journal wrote: "The film, directed very cleanly and pleasingly by Erich Waschneck, depicts in an exemplary manner the dangers and the faithful fulfillment of duty in the difficult profession of the firefighter. The performance […] is consistently excellent."

Murtaler Zeitung described The Man in the Fire as "a drama of inglorious heroes in battle with the elements."

Villacher Zeitung said: "The plot, as well as the presentation and visuals, are admirable and successful. The performance is superb."

== Bibliography ==
- Hans-Michael Bock and Tim Bergfelder. The Concise Cinegraph: An Encyclopedia of German Cinema. Berghahn Books.
