= Christa Tordy =

German actress

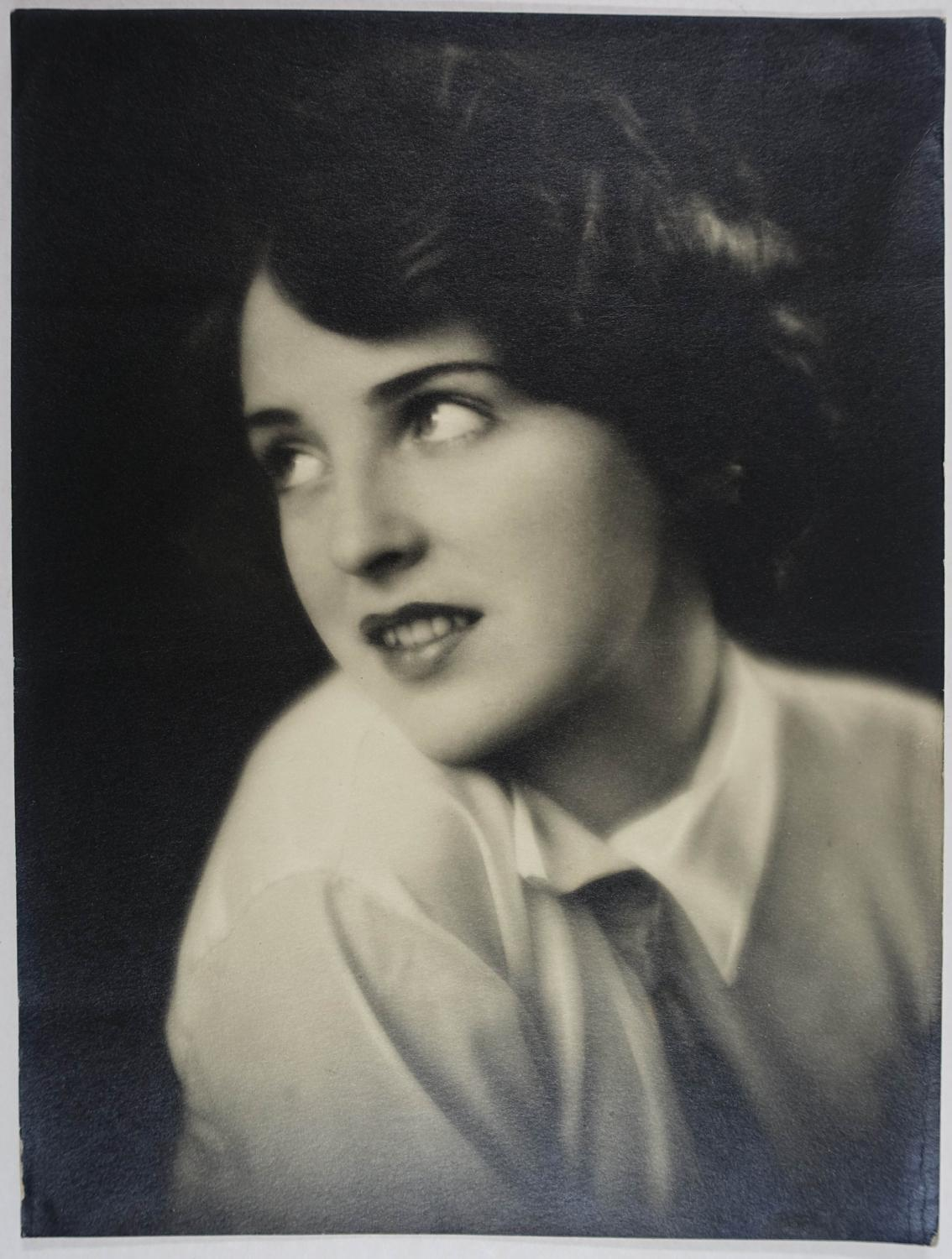
- Born: Anneliese Uhlhorn; 30 June 1904; Bremen, German Empire
- Died: 28 April 1945 (aged 40); Bad Saarow-Pieskow, Nazi Germany
- Occupation: Actress
- Years active: 1926–1928
- Spouse: Harry Liedtke (m. 1928; died 1945)
- Relatives: Mady Christians (cousin)

Christa Tordy (born Anneliese Uhlhorn, 30 June 1904 – 28 April 1945) was a German film actress. She was discovered while visiting her cousin Mady Christians in Berlin, and briefly became a leading star before retiring after marrying Harry Liedtke. She was murdered along with her husband by the Soviet Red Army at her home during its invasion of Germany during World War II.

== Biography ==
Christa Tordy was born Anneliese Uhlhorn on 30 June 1904 in Bremen. She spent her childhood in Wiesbaden after her father had retired there. There, she attended high school, graduating at age 17, and began studying art history, archaeology, philosophy, and literary history in Berlin and Munich, finishing her studies in Breslau with a doctorate. During her time in school, she also participated in student theater, creating and staging plays.

In 1925, Tordy visited her cousin Mady Christians who was then working on the film A Waltz Dream. Tordy was noticed by director Ludwig Berger or cinematographer Werner Brandes, who persuaded her to undergo a screen test.

Tordy had a short but successful period at the end of the 1920s with several silent movies. She made her film debut in The Sea Cadet (1926), followed by His Toughest Case (1926). She next starred in Prinz Louis Ferdinand (1927) and Potsdam (1927), both alongside Hans Stüwe. Tordy's final screen appearance was in the silent comedy film Love on Skis (1928), which she acted in with her husband Harry Liedtke. The film was released a fortnight after their marriage.

Tordy and Liedtke married on 27 March 1928 and Tordy retired from the film industry shortly thereafter. She only appeared in 8 films during her career.

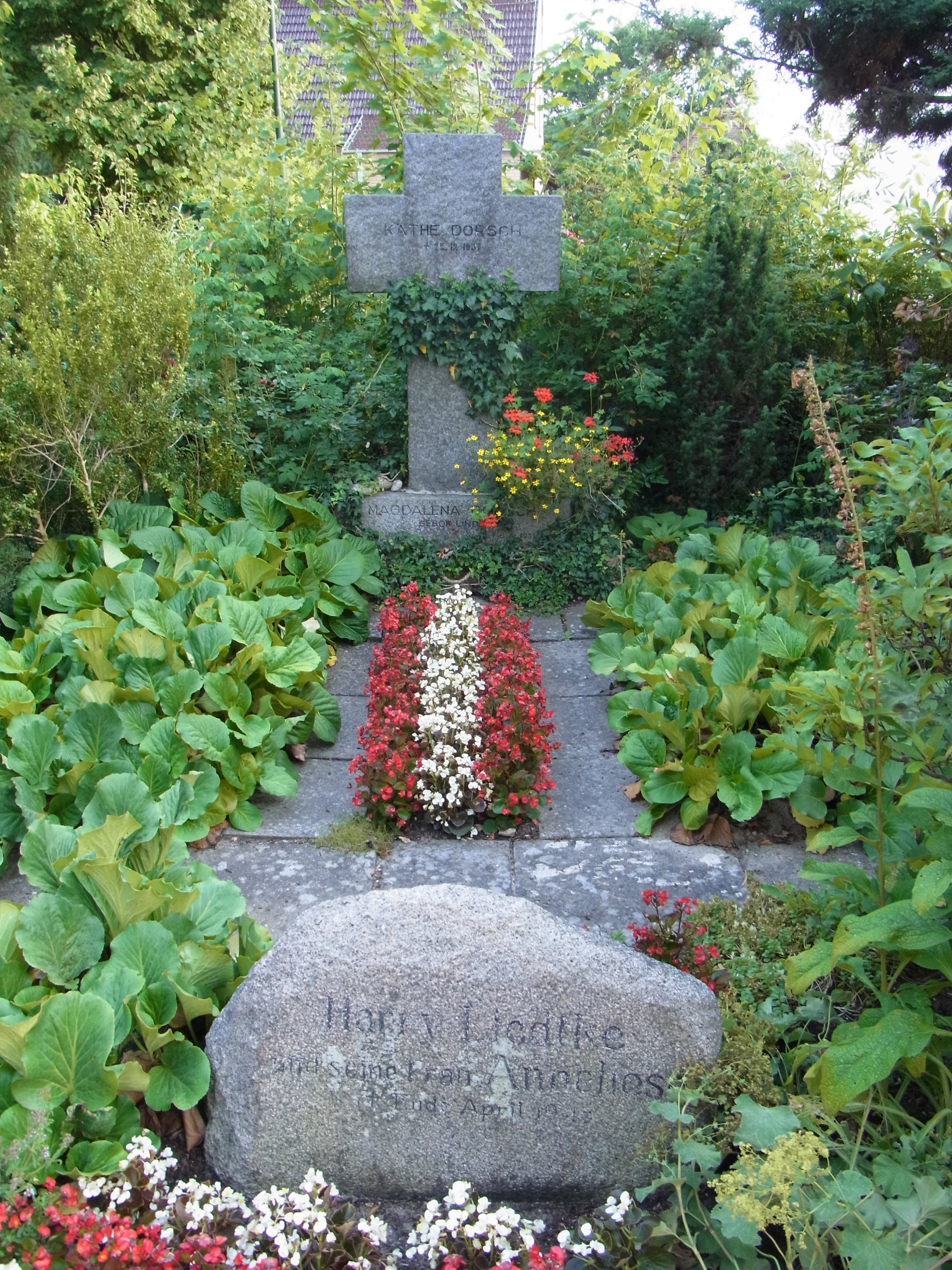
Grave of Harry Liedtke and his spouses Käthe Dorsch and Christa Tordy in Pieskow, Bad Saarow

On 28 April 1945, Christa Tordy and Harry Liedtke were murdered by the Soviet Red Army. Liedtke had tried to save his wife from being raped and murdered, but died after either being smashed on the head with a beer bottle, or after being clubbed to death. Prior to their murder, the couple had attempted suicide.

Tordy and Liedtke's bodies were exhumed in October 1948 and they were buried at Waldfriedhof Saarow-Pieskow Cemetery. Upon Liedtke's ex-wife Käthe Dorsch's death in 1957, she was buried alongside the two.

== Filmography ==
- The Sea Cadet (1926)
- His Toughest Case (1926)
- Prinz Louis Ferdinand (1927)
- Die Beichte des Feldkuraten (1927)
- Potsdam (1927)
- Das Geheimnis von Genf (1928)
- The Countess of Sand (1928)
- Love on Skis (1928)

== Bibliography ==
- Hardt, Ursula. From Caligari to California: Erich Pommer's Life in the International Film Wars. Berghahn Books, 1996. ISBN 978-1571810250
