= Rosenmontag (film) =

1924 film

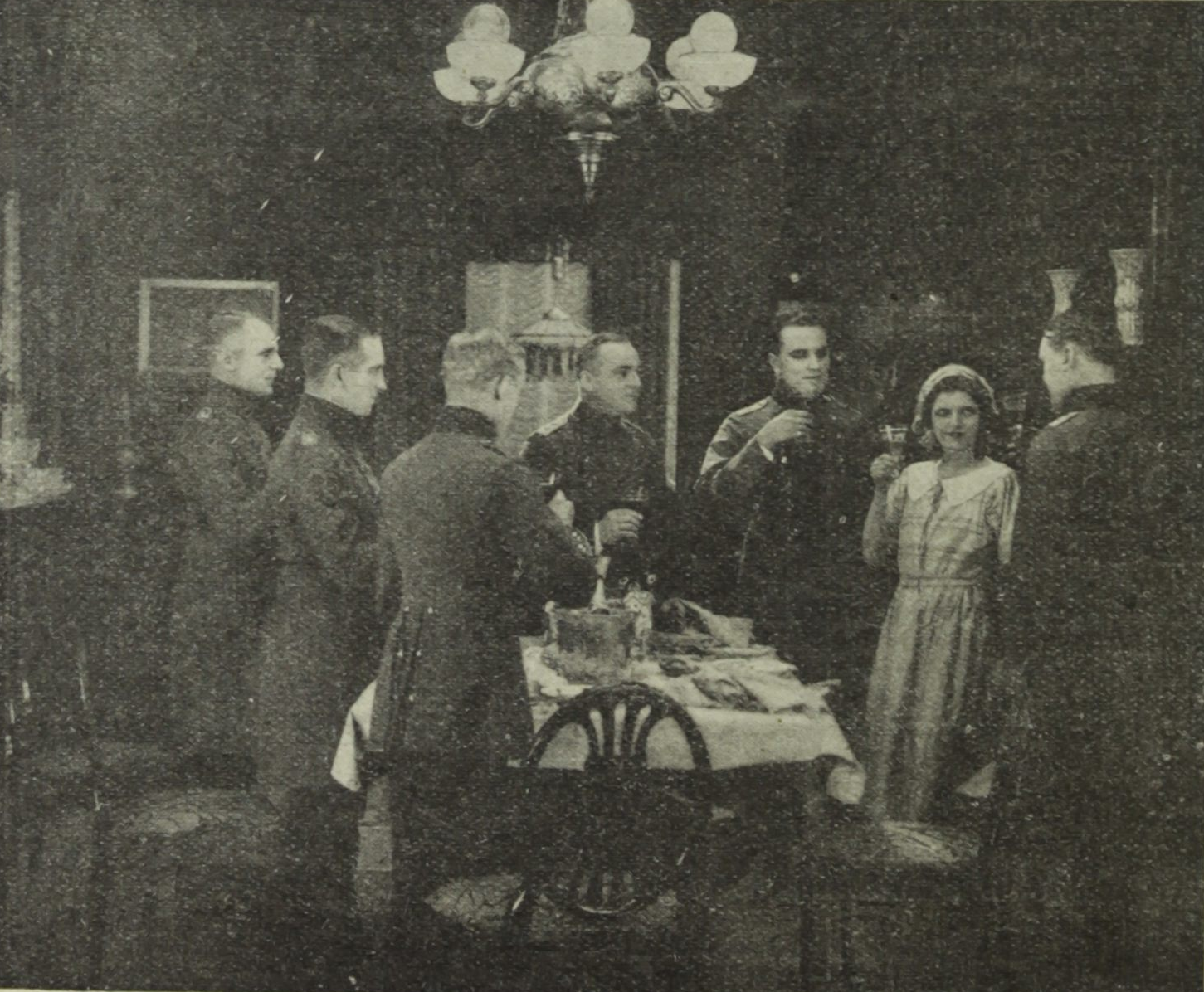
- Directed by: Rudolf Meinert
- Written by: Emanuel Alfieri
- Based on: Rosenmontag by Otto Erich Hartleben
- Produced by: Rudolf Meinert
- Starring: Gerd Briese; Helga Thomas; Maria Reisenhofer; Charles Willy Kayser
- Cinematography: Otto Kanturek
- Music by: Bruno Gellert
- Production company: International Film-AG
- Distributed by: International Film-AG
- Release date: 1924
- Country: Germany
- Languages: Silent; German intertitles

Rosenmontag (English: Love's Carnival) is a 1924 German silent romance film directed by Rudolf Meinert and starring Gerd Briese, Helga Thomas and Maria Reisenhofer. It was based on a 1900 play of the same title by Otto Erich Hartleben.

== Cast ==
- Gerd Briese
- Helga Thomas
- Maria Reisenhofer
- Charles Willy Kayser
- Franz Schönfeld
- F.W. Schröder-Schrom
- Alfred Braun
- Rio Nobile
- Otto Reinwald
- Ernst Nessler
- Jutta Jol
- Adele Reuter-Eichberg
- Rudolf Maas

== See also ==
- Love's Carnival (1930)
- Love's Carnival (1955)
