= Opium (1919 film) =

1919 film directed by Robert Reinert

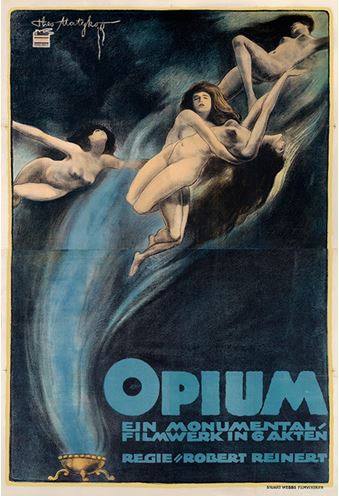
- Directed by: Robert Reinert
- Written by: Robert Reinert
- Produced by: Robert Reinert
- Starring: Eduard von Winterstein; Sybill Morel; Werner Krauss; Conrad Veidt
- Cinematography: Helmar Lerski
- Music by: I. Poltschuk
- Production company: Monumental-Film
- Distributed by: Stern-Film
- Release date: 29 January 1919 (Germany)
- Running time: 112 minutes
- Country: Germany
- Languages: Silent; German intertitles

Opium is a 1919 German silent film directed by Robert Reinert and starring Eduard von Winterstein, Sybill Morel, and Werner Krauss.

== Plot ==
Towards the end of his research stay in China, during which he devoted himself intensively to investigating the effects of opium, Professor Gesellius learns of Nung-Tschang, the owner of an opium den, who supposedly possesses a particularly potent strain of the drug. Upon arriving there, the Chinese man tells the European the following story: Nung-Tschang's wife had once had a secret affair with a European and subsequently gave birth to an illegitimate child. Enraged, Nung-Tschang murdered his wife and took the child. He used the adulterous European as a human test subject to study the effects of his special opium.

Gesellius then meets the young Chinese woman Sin. She begs the professor to free her from Nung-Tschang's clutches. Only later does the opium researcher learn that Sin is the very child whose mother Nung-Tschang killed in a fit of jealousy. Gesellius takes Sin in and flees China with her in haste. But Nung-Tschang has also left his homeland and is hot on their heels. When he enters the professor's newly opened clinic, he believes his story is repeating itself in a dramatic way, for once again a European has taken his wife, and this time Sin as well, whom he considers his property and a pawn. Nung-Tschang is ruthless in his pursuit of revenge. He knows the fatal effects of his opium mixture and intends to make Gesellius addicted and dependent on it—just as he once did with Sin's father.

Opium (1919)

Professor Gesellius' life, too, seems to have been turned upside down since his return home. Nothing is as it was before. His wife, Maria, has been unfaithful to him, and with none other than his favorite student, Richard Armstrong. Then Richard's father, long thought lost, reappears. He is completely addicted to opium and, under a false name, is placed in the professor's clinic. When Father Armstrong encounters Sin, who works there as a nurse named Magdalena, he recognizes the girl he once fathered with Nung-Tschang's wife. Richard Armstrong is distraught because, on the one hand, he reveres his mentor and employer, Gesellius, and on the other hand, he loves Gesellius's wife, Maria. In a staged riding accident, he is seriously injured and can no longer speak. He leaves a farewell letter in a locket belonging to Gesellius's daughter and takes his own life with poison. Meanwhile, Gesellius, under the influence of opium, dreams that he kills Armstrong out of jealousy. After the dream wears off, he cannot remember whether he carried it out or if it was just a dream. Plagued by doubt and guilt, he accepts a commission for further research in India. His loyal servant Ali, Magdalena, and, secretly, Nung-Tschang follow him.

In India, Gesellius finally succumbs to the drug. Nung-Tschang continues to plot against Gesellius and ensures that the princely couple becomes aware of the European. When, in an opium-induced haze, he accepts the Maharani's advances, he is arrested by the Maharaja's soldiers and taken to the jungle, where he is to be killed by lions. At the last moment, he is rescued by Magdalena and Ali, but before the three can leave the jungle, Nung-Tschang kills the servant Ali.

Back in Europe, Gesellius is admitted to his own clinic, a mental and physical wreck. At first, only his young daughter recognizes him. To ease his guilt, Magdalena confesses that she administered the poison to Armstrong. Magdalena is convicted and imprisoned, where Nung-Tschang attempts to free her and is shot dead by guards. Gesellius spends much time with his daughter and also opens the locket containing Armstrong's suicide note. This proves Magdalena's and his innocence in Armstrong's death, and Gesellius is able to die in peace, smoking his last opium pipe.

== Cast ==
- Eduard von Winterstein as Professor Gesellius
- Sybill Morel as Sin / Magdalena
- Werner Krauss as Nung-Tschang
- Friedrich Kühne as Richard Armstrong, father
- Hanna Ralph as Maria Geselius
- Conrad Veidt as Dr. Richard Armstrong Jr.
- Alexander Delbosq
- Sigrid Hohenfels as Maharaja's wife
- Loni Nest as Kind

== Bibliography ==
- Packer, Sharon (2007). Movies and the Modern Psyche. Westport, CT: Praeger. ISBN 978-0-275-99359-7.
