= Boycott (1930 film) =

1930 film

- Directed by: Robert Land
- Written by: Arnold Ulitz (novel); Robert Land; Alfred Schirokauer; Karl Wilczynski; Eugen Kürschner
- Starring: Ernst Stahl-Nachbaur; Lil Dagover; Rolf von Goth
- Cinematography: Franz Koch
- Edited by: Géza Pollatschik
- Music by: Franz Grothe; Alexander Laszlo
- Production company: Münchner Lichtspielkunst
- Distributed by: Bavaria Film
- Release date: 15 December 1930
- Running time: 75 minutes
- Country: Germany
- Language: German

Boycott (German: Boykott) is a 1930 German drama film directed by Robert Land and starring Ernst Stahl-Nachbaur, Lil Dagover, and Rolf von Goth. It was shot at the Emelka Studios in Munich. The film's sets were designed by the art director Ludwig Reiber.

== Plot ==
At an elite high school in Berlin in the early 1930s: all of the high school seniors, who all came from higher circles, adhere to a conservative concept of morality and honor. When the building contractor Haller is accused of fraud, the class boycotts his son Erich, much to the dismay of the class teacher, Dr. Herman. Only Erich's classmate Möller and his sister Grete stick by him. His classmate Herbert von Pahl told Erich that he would take his own life in the same situation. Dr Hermann makes it clear that nobody is responsible for the actions of others, only for one's own actions. He unequivocally expresses that he does not consider suicide to be a sign of strength and heroism, but rather weakness and cowardice.

The insecure Erich tries to gain clarity, but he reaps scorn and cynicism. Although his disillusioned stepmother worries about Erich, she has long since turned her back on his father and is leaving the family by eloping with an admirer. When it turns out that von Pahl's father is also involved in the affair, Herbert puts his announcement into action. The shaken Erich is plagued by self-doubt and wanders aimlessly through Berlin. Disturbed by his disappearance, Dr. Hermann and his classmates search Treptower Park for him. In the meantime, he visits his father, who is now in custody. He mocks Erich and confesses that it would have been best if he had never married and, above all, never had children. Erich realizes that he has nothing in common with his father and looks for Dr. Hermann in his apartment. The next morning, Erich and Dr. Hermann enter the classroom to an enthusiastic reception by his classmates.

== Cast ==
- Ernst Stahl-Nachbaur as Generaldirektor Haller
- Lil Dagover as Seine Frau
- Rolf von Goth as Erich, sein Sohn, Oberprimaner
- Theodor Loos as Dr.Hermann
- Erich Nuernberger as von Pahl, Oberprimaner
- Wolfgang Zilzer as Möller, Oberprimaner
- Karin Evans a sGrete Möller, seine Schwester
- Harry Hertzsch as Rittmeister a.D.
- Augustin Egern as Barsänger
- Magda Schneider as Zofe
- Max Schreck as Beamter in der Strafsvollzugsanstalt

== Bibliography ==
- Bock, Hans-Michael; Bergfelder, Tim, eds. (2009). The Concise Cinegraph: Encyclopaedia of German Cinema. New York: Berghahn Books. ISBN 978-1-57181-655-9.
