= The Geisha and the Samurai =

1919 film

- German: Die Geisha und der Samurai
- Directed by: Carl Boese
- Written by: Hans Brennert; Friedel Köhne
- Cinematography: George Greenbaum
- Production company: Firmament-Film
- Distributed by: Splendid Film Company
- Release date: 28 June 1919
- Country: Germany
- Languages: Silent; German intertitles

The Geisha and the Samurai (German: Die Geisha und der Samurai) is a 1919 German silent film directed by Carl Boese.

== Cast ==
- Ernst Deutsch
- Werner Hollmann
- Sybill Morel
- Gertrude Welcker
