= The Anthem of Love =

1922 film

- Directed by: Heinz Schall
- Written by: Johannes Riemann
- Starring: Claire Rommer; Johannes Riemann; Ilka Grüning
- Cinematography: Fritz Arno Wagner; Curt Courant
- Production company: Koop-Film
- Release date: 10 December 1922
- Running time: 2013 metres
- Country: Germany
- Languages: Silent; German intertitles

The Anthem of Love (German: Das hohe Lied der Liebe) is a 1922 German silent romance film directed by Heinz Schall and starring Claire Rommer, Johannes Riemann and Ilka Grüning.

== Cast ==
- Claire Rommer
- Johannes Riemann
- Ilka Grüning
- Gertrude Welcker

== Bibliography ==
- Bock, Hans-Michael; Bergfelder, Tim, eds. (2009). The Concise Cinegraph: Encyclopaedia of German Cinema. New York: Berghahn Books. ISBN 978-1-57181-655-9.
- Grange, William (2008). Cultural Chronicle of the Weimar Republic. Lanham, MD: Scarecrow Press. ISBN 978-0-8108-5967-8.
