= Fritz Kraenke =

German art director

- Born: 28 March 1890; Berlin, German Empire
- Died: 1 December 1947 (aged 57); Los Angeles, California, United States
- Occupation: Art director
- Years active: 1915-1926 (film)

Fritz Kraenke (1890–1947) was a German art director. He worked on the sets of more than thirty films during the silent era.

== Selected filmography ==
- Miss Piccolo (1914)
- The Yellow Death (1920)
- The Skull of Pharaoh's Daughter (1920)
- The Railway King (1921)
- The Tiger of Circus Farini (1923)
- Maciste and the Chinese Chest (1923)
- The Great Industrialist (1923)
- Rudderless (1924)
- Adventure on the Night Express (1925)
- Swifter Than Death (1925)
- Ash Wednesday (1925)
- The Captain from Koepenick (1926)
- The Woman in Gold (1926)
- We'll Meet Again in the Heimat (1926)

== Bibliography ==
- Matias Bleckman. Harry Piel: ein Kino-Mythos und seine Zeit. Filminstitut der Landeshaupstadt Düsseldorf, 1992.
