= Hans Stüwe =

German actor

- Born: 14 May 1901; Halle, Province of Saxony, Prussia, German Empire
- Died: 13 May 1976 (aged 74); West Berlin, West Germany
- Occupation: Actor
- Years active: 1927–1955

Hans Stüwe (14 May 1901 – 13 May 1976) was a German stage and film actor, singer, film and opera director. As a singer he made his debut at the Stadttheater in Königsberg and moved to Berlin to play on stage.

== Filmography ==
Year	Title	Role	Notes
1925	Die Aßmanns	Assessor von Bühren	
1926	Des Königs Befehl		
1927	Prinz Louis Ferdinand	Luis Ferdinand	
1927	Potsdam		
1927	Feme	Joachim Burthe	
1927	The Bordello in Rio	Ernst Verloost	
1927	Assassination	NadtDr. Themal	
1927	The Transformation of Dr. Bessel	Alexander, ihr Sohn	
1928	The Prince of Rogues	Hannes Bückler - Schinderhannes	
1928	The Sinner	Gaston	
1928	Pawns of Passion	Bruno Bronek, Maler	
1928	Villa Falconieri	Cola Graf Campana, Schriftsteller	
1928	Anastasia, the False Czar's Daughter	Iwan Wolkoff	
1929	Cagliostro	Cagliostro	
1929	Flucht in die Fremdenlegion	Georg Leitron	
1929	Hungarian Nights	Capt. Arpad Bartok	
1929	Poison Gas	Arnold Horn, ein Erfinder	
1929	It's You I Have Loved	Dr. Hubert Baumgart	
1930	Die Jugendgeliebte	Johann Wolfgang Goethe	
1930	Der Walzerkönig	Johann Strauß	
1930	Echo of a Dream	Puiu Faranga / Mironescu	
1930	Retreat on the Rhine	Oskar Graf von Rastenfeld	
1931	Ash Wednesday	Leutnant v. Linken	
1931	A Woman Branded	Dr.Kurt Rehmann - Ilses Verlobter	
1931	The Woman They Talk About	René Bennett	
1931	Alarm at Midnight	Kriminalkommissar Bremer	
1932	The Dancer of Sanssouci	Baron Cocceji	
1932	Tannenberg	Rittmeister von Arndt - Gutsbesitzer	
1932	Trenck	Freiherr von der Trenck	
1933	The Master Detective	Max Müller	
1933	Johannisnacht	Heinrich Radegast, Schriftsteller	
1934	At the Strasbourg	Ruedi Pfister, Sohn	
1934	You Are Adorable, Rosmarie	Frank Quick	
1934	Nocturno	Karl	
1935	The Private Life of Louis XIV	Philipp von Orleans, sein Bruder	
1935	The Saint and Her Fool	Graf Harro Thorstein	
1936	The Haunted Castle	Andreas, Leopolds Bruder	
1936	Heißes Blut	Tibor von Dénes	
1936	Back in the Country	Lüder Volkmann	
1937	Millionenerbschaft	Michael Korff	
1938	The Tiger of Eschnapur	Architekt Fürbringer	
1938	The Indian Tomb	Peter Fürbringer, Architekt	
1939	The Life and Loves of Tschaikovsky	Pjotr Iljitsch Tschaikowsky	
1939	Three Fathers for Anna	Dr. Bruck	
1940	Passion	Hans Strobel	
1941	The Way to Freedom	Detlev von Blossin - Antonias Mann	
1943	Back Then	Jan Meiners, Reichsanwalt	
1944	The Enchanted Day	Professor Albrecht Götz	
1948	Gaspary's Sons	Robert Gaspary	
1951	The Heath is Green	Lüder Lüdersen	
1952	At the Well in Front of the Gate	Georg Straaten	
1953	Come Back	Konrad Frisius	
1953	Ave Maria	Dietrich Gontard	
1953	When The Village Music Plays on Sunday Nights	Gutsbesitzer Ertl	
1954	Daybreak	Oberst Gaffron	
1955	The Ambassador's Wife	Christian Lundvall	
1957	Blaue Jungs	Brugger Carlos	(final film role)

== Bibliography ==
- O'Brien, Mary-Elizabeth. Nazi Cinema as Enchantment: The Politics of Entertainment in the Third Reich. Camden House, 2004.
