= People in Need (film) =

1925 film

- Directed by: Wolfgang Neff
- Written by: Marie Luise Droop
- Produced by: Liddy Hegewald
- Starring: Hermine Sterler; Werner Pittschau; Claire Rommer
- Cinematography: Willy Goldberger
- Production company: Hegewald Film
- Distributed by: Hegewald Film
- Release date: 10 December 1925
- Country: Germany
- Languages: Silent; German intertitles

People in Need (German: Volk in Not or Ein Heldenlied von Tannenberg) is a 1925 German silent war film directed by Wolfgang Neff and starring Hermine Sterler, Werner Pittschau and Claire Rommer.

The film's sets were designed by the art director Willi Herrmann.

== Cast ==
- Hermine Sterler as Elisabeth Ditten, Gutsbesitzerin
- Werner Pittschau as Horst - Elisabeths Sohn
- Claire Rommer as Herta - Elisabeths Nichte
- Heinrich Peer as Der Oberst
- Josef Breitbart as Ein Offiziersbursche
- Wilhelm Diegelmann as Der Pastor
- Eva Speyer as Die Pastorin
- Sophie Pagay as Die Magd
- Eduard von Winterstein as General Samsonoff
- Gustav Adolf Semler as Graf Wolkonski - Samsonoffs Adjutant
- Karl Beckersachs as Jergunoff - russischer Stabsarzt
- Aruth Wartan as Russischer Generalstabchef
- Ernst Rückert as Russischer Leutnant
- Traute Gerlach as Ein Bauernmädchen

== Bibliography ==
- Kester, Bernadette. Film Front Weimar: Representations of the First World War in German films of the Weimar Period (1919–1933). Amsterdam University Press, 2003.
