= Claire Rommer =

German actress

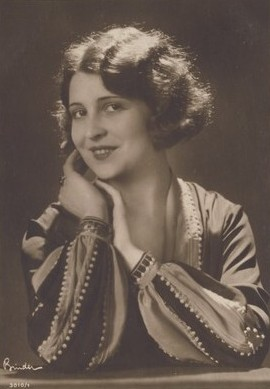
- Rommer in 1928
- Born: Klara Romberger; 7 December 1904; Berlin, German Empire
- Died: 19 August 1996 (aged 91); London, United Kingdom
- Occupation: Actress
- Years active: 1920–1938
- Spouse: Adolf Strenger

Claire Rommer (born Klara Romberger; 7 December 1904 – 19 August 1996) was a German stage and film actress.

== Selected filmography ==
- The Queen of Whitechapel (1922)
- The Anthem of Love (1922)
- Der Herzog von Aleria (1923)
- Judith (1923)
- The Great Industrialist (1923)
- The Fake Emir (1924)
- The Third Watch (1924)
- Playing with Destiny (1924)
- The Man at Midnight (1924)
- A Dangerous Game (1924)
- Wallenstein (1925)
- People in Need (1925)
- The Iron Bride (1925)
- Love Story (1925)
- The Salesgirl from the Fashion Store (1925)
- Ash Wednesday (1925)
- The Third Squadron (1926)
- In Treue stark (1926)
- Circus Romanelli (1926)
- Torments of the Night (1926)
- Eternal Allegiance (1926)
- Her Highness Dances the Waltz (1926)
- The Woman from the Folies Bergères (1927)
- Circle of Lovers (1927)
- Children's Souls Accuse You (1927)
- One Plus One Equals Three (1927)
- The City of a Thousand Delights (1927)
- Herkules Maier (1928)
- Orient (1928)
- Mikosch Comes In (1928)
- The Carousel of Death (1928)
- When the Guard Marches (1928)
- Leontine's Husbands (1928)
- Death Drive for the World Record (1929)
- Scapa Flow (1930)
- Weekend in Paradise (1931)
- Peace of Mind (1931)
- The Battle of Bademunde (1931)
- Ash Wednesday (1931)
- All is at Stake (1932)
- Two Lucky Days (1932)
- A Thousand for One Night (1933)

== Bibliography ==
- Jung, Uli & Schatzberg, Walter. Beyond Caligari: The Films of Robert Wiene. Berghahn Books, 1999.
