= The Marriage Swindler (1922 film) =

1922 film

- Directed by: Wolfgang Neff
- Written by: Jane Bess
- Produced by: Liddy Hegewald
- Starring: Karl Falkenberg; Mia Pankau; Willy Fritsch
- Cinematography: Josef Rona
- Production company: Hegewald Film
- Distributed by: Hegewald Film
- Release date: 9 May 1922
- Country: Germany
- Languages: Silent; German intertitles

The Marriage Swindler (German: Heiratsschwindler) is a 1922 German silent comedy film directed by Wolfgang Neff and starring Karl Falkenberg, Mia Pankau and Willy Fritsch. The film's sets were designed by the art director Franz Schroedter.

== Cast ==
- Karl Falkenberg as Fred Asten
- Mia Pankau as Gisela Fels - Stern des Metro-Theaters
- Willy Fritsch as Kurt Asten
- Dora Friese as Elisabeth Wagner
- Maria Grünke as Mutter von Elisabeth

== Bibliography ==
- Bock, Hans-Michael & Bergfelder, Tim. The Concise CineGraph. Encyclopedia of German Cinema. Berghahn Books, 2009.
- Caneppele, Paolo. Entscheidungen der Tiroler Filmzensur: 1922-1938. : Film Archiv Austria, 2002.
