= Poison Gas (film) =

1929 film

- Dutch theatrical release poster
- Directed by: Mikhail Dubson
- Written by: Peter Martin Lampel (play); Nathan Zarkhi
- Starring: Hans Stüwe; Lissy Arna; Alfred Abel
- Cinematography: Akos Farkas
- Music by: Werner Schmidt-Boelcke
- Production companies: Filmproduktion Loew & Co.
- Release date: 13 November 1929
- Running time: 87 minutes
- Country: Germany
- Languages: Silent; German intertitles

Poison Gas (German: Giftgas) is a 1929 German silent drama film directed by Mikhail Dubson and starring Hans Stüwe, Lissy Arna and Alfred Abel. It is based on the play Poison Gas over Berlin by Peter Martin Lampel. The film's sets were designed by the art director August Rinaldi.

== Cast ==
- Hans Stüwe as Arnold Horn, ein Erfinder
- Lissy Arna as Ellen
- Alfred Abel as Direktor Hansen
- Fritz Kortner as Konzernpräsident Straaten
- Gerhard Dammann as Arbeiter Pieter
- Vera Baranovskaya as Pieters Frau
- Bobby Burns as Pieters Sohn
- Nico Turoff
- Paul Rehkopf
- Carl Goetz

== Bibliography ==
- Kreimeier, Klaus. The Ufa Story: A History of Germany's Greatest Film Company, 1918-1945. University of California Press, 1999.
