= Helga Thomas =

Swedish actress

- Born: Helga Amalia Thomas; 8 July 1891; Skog, Västernorrland County, Sweden
- Died: 6 July 1988 (aged 96); Stockholm
- Occupation: Film Actress
- Known for: German silent movies 1923-1930

Helga Amalia Thomas (8 July 1891 – 6 July 1988) was a Swedish film actress.

Thomas was born in Skog parish in Västernorrland County. She had a career in German film during the silent era, between 1923 and 1930. She died in Stockholm in 1988.

== Selected filmography ==
- One Glass of Water (1923)
- Nora (1923)
- The Lost Shoe (1923)
- The Second Shot (1923)
- Rosenmontag (1924)
- The Man in the Fire (1926)
- The Poacher (1926)
- A Day of Roses in August (1927)
- German Women - German Faithfulness (1927)
- The Sinner (1928)
- Latin Quarter (1929)
- Beware of Loose Women (1929)
- Dawn (1929)
