= Vacation from Marriage (1927 film) =

1927 film

- Directed by: Victor Janson
- Written by: Robert Liebmann
- Produced by: Richard Eichberg
- Starring: Harry Halm; Lilian Harvey; Jutta Jol
- Cinematography: Károly Vass
- Production companies: Richard Eichberg-Film; UFA
- Distributed by: Parufamet
- Release date: 13 December 1927
- Running time: 60 minutes
- Country: Germany
- Languages: Silent; German intertitles

Vacation from Marriage (German: Eheferien) is a 1927 German silent comedy film directed by Victor Janson and starring Harry Halm, Lilian Harvey and Jutta Jol.

The film's art direction was by Jacek Rotmil.

== Cast ==
- Harry Halm as Wenzel Strakosch, Violin-Virtuose
- Lilian Harvey as Hella, seine zweite Frau
- Jutta Jol as Erika, seine erste Frau
- Hans Sturm as Carlos Torres, südamerikanisher Plantagenbesitzer
- Bert Bloem as Enrique, sein Sohn
- Angelo Ferrari as Rudi Becker, Tenor
- Else Reval as Seine bessere Hälfte
- Ida Perry as Frau Tuchel
- Asta Gundt as Adalgisa, ihre Tochter
- Harry Gondi as Hans, ein junger Mann
- Ruth Beyer as Mizzi, Mädel von heute
- Albert Paulig as Der Hoteldirektor

== Bibliography ==
- Goble, Alan. The Complete Index to Literary Sources in Film. Walter de Gruyter, 1999.
