= Eugen Kürschner =

Hungarian film producer

Eugen Kürschner (1890-1939) was a Hungarian film producer.

== Selected filmography ==
- Der Graf von Essex (1922)
- Prinz Louis Ferdinand (1927)
- Orient Express (1927)
- Boycott (1930)
- The Countess of Monte Cristo (1932)
- Der Liebesphotograph (1933)
- Today Is the Day (1933)
