= The Second Shot (1923 film) =

1923 film

- Directed by: Maurice Krol
- Written by: Ruth Goetz; Maurice Krol
- Starring: William Dieterle; Anton Pointner; Helga Thomas
- Cinematography: Friedrich Weinmann
- Production company: Decla-Bioscop
- Distributed by: Decla-Bioscop
- Release date: 20 April 1923
- Country: Germany
- Languages: Silent; German intertitles

The Second Shot (German: Der zweite Schuß) is a 1923 German silent film directed by Maurice Krol and starring William Dieterle, Anton Pointner and Helga Thomas.

== Cast ==
- William Dieterle
- Anton Pointner
- Helga Thomas
- Heddy Sven
- Ernst Dernburg
- Wilhelm Diegelmann
- Ernst Pittschau

== Bibliography ==
- Bock, Hans-Michael & Bergfelder, Tim. The Concise CineGraph. Encyclopedia of German Cinema. Berghahn Books, 2009.
