= Esther Carena =

German actress (1898–1972)

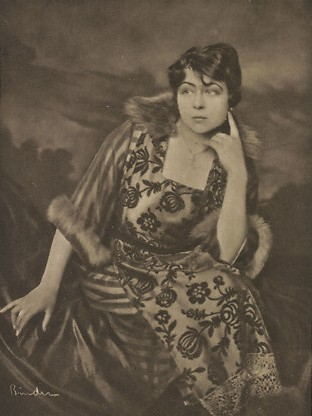
- Esther Carena by Alexander Binder
- Born: Franziska Lucia Pfeiffer; 24 August 1898; Hannover, German Empire
- Died: 26 January 1972 (aged 73); Hamburg, West Germany
- Occupation: Actress
- Years active: 1916–1924
- Spouse: Franz Schroedter (m. 1924)

Esther Carena (born Franziska Lucia Pfeiffer; 24 August 1898 – 26 January 1972) was a German actress. She appeared in more than 30 films between 1916 and 1924.

== Biography ==
The daughter of a German father and Spanish mother, she studied medicine for one semester and trained in an Italian acrobat troupe. Until 1916 she lived mostly in Italy and performed there in stage sketches.

In 1916 she came to Germany and was discovered by Swedish film actor and director Nils Olaf Chrisander. She was presented as a heroine in thrillers, dramas, and melodramas that were staged by Harry Piel at the end of the First World War. She designed many of her own costumes. In 1924 she married the set designer Franz Schroedter and retired from films.

== Selected filmography ==
Year	Title	Role	Notes
1918	The Ghost Hunt	Juanita	
1922	The Queen of Whitechapel	Ninette	
1923	The Shadow of the Mosque		
1924	Dangerous Clues	Gitty	
