= Jane Bess =

German screenwriter

- Born: Rosette Herta Rosenthal; 28 November 1891; Posen, German Empire
- Died: March 1944 (aged 52); Auschwitz concentration camp, Occupied Poland
- Other name: Jane Beß
- Occupation: Writer
- Years active: 1919–1935 (film )

Jane Bess (1891–1944) was a German screenwriter. Following the rise to power of the Nazi Party in 1933, she went into exile in the Netherlands. She was later murdered at Auschwitz concentration camp in occupied Poland in 1944 during the holocaust.

== Selected filmography ==
- The Inheritance from New York (1919)
- Yellow Star (1922)
- Fratricide (1922)
- The Cigarette Countess (1922)
- Shame (1922)
- The Marriage Swindler (1922)
- The Heart of Lilian Thorland (1924)
- The Morals of the Alley (1925)
- The Golden Butterfly (1926)
- Unmarried Daughters (1926)
- The Divorcée (1926)
- The Queen of the Baths (1926)
- Sword and Shield (1926)
- State Attorney Jordan (1926)
- Radio Magic (1927)
- The Woman with the World Record (1927)
- The Story of a Little Parisian (1928)
- A Girl with Temperament (1928)
- The Beloved of His Highness (1928)
- Who Invented Divorce? (1928)
- The Woman in the Advocate's Gown (1929)
- The Circus Princess (1929)
- Alarm at Midnight (1931)
- The Cross-Patch (1935)

== Bibliography ==
- Taves, Brian. P.G. Wodehouse and Hollywood: Screenwriting, Satires and Adaptations. McFarland, 2006.
