= List of German films of 1926 =

This is a list of the most notable films produced in the Cinema of Germany in 1926.

Title	Director	Cast	Genre	Notes
1926
Accommodations for Marriage	Georg Jacoby	Elga Brink, Georg Alexander	Comedy	
The Adventurers	Rudolf Walther-Fein	Harry Liedtke, Erna Morena	Adventure	
The Adventure of Mr. Philip Collins	Johannes Guter	Georg Alexander, Ossi Oswalda	Comedy	
Annemarie and Her Cavalryman	Erich Eriksen	Colette Brettel, Sig Arno	Comedy	
The Armoured Vault	Lupu Pick	Ernst Reicher, Mary Nolan	Thriller	
The Bank Crash of Unter den Linden	Paul Merzbach	Hans Albers, Margarete Schlegel	Drama	
The Battle Against Berlin	Max Reichmann	Carlo Aldini, Jenny Jugo	Thriller	
Battle of the Sexes	Heinrich Brandt	Aud Egede-Nissen, Paul Richter	Comedy	
The Black Pierrot	Harry Piel	Harry Piel, Dary Holm	Thriller	
The Blue Danube	Frederic Zelnik	Harry Liedtke, Lya Mara	Romance	
The Bohemian Dancer	Frederic Zelnik	Lya Mara, Harry Liedtke	Drama	
The Boxer's Bride	Johannes Guter	Xenia Desni, Willy Fritsch	Sports	
The Brothers Schellenberg	Karl Grune	Conrad Veidt, Lil Dagover	Drama	
Cab No. 13	Michael Curtiz	Lili Damita, Jack Trevor	Drama	
The Captain from Köpenick	Siegfried Dessauer	Hermann Picha, Fritz Kampers	Comedy	All copies that could be found were ordered destroyed by Hitler
Chaste Susanne	Richard Eichberg	Lilian Harvey, Willy Fritsch	comedy	
Children of No Importance	Gerhard Lamprecht	Bernhard Goetzke, Margarete Kupfer	Drama	
The Circus of Life	Mario Bonnard	Marcella Albani, Vladimir Gajdarov	Silent	
Circus Romanelli	Georg Jacoby	Reinhold Schünzel, Claire Rommer	Comedy	
The Clever Fox	Conrad Wiene	Hans Brausewetter, Clementine Plessner	Comedy	
Countess Ironing-Maid	Constantin J. David	Ossi Oswalda, Curt Bois	Comedy	
Dagfin	Joe May	Paul Richter, Alfred Gerasch	Silent	
Darling, Count the Cash	Felix Basch	Sig Arno, Ossi Oswalda	Comedy	
Department Store Princess	Heinz Paul	Hella Moja, Hans Albers	Silent	
Derby	Max Reichmann, Joe May	Barbara von Annenkoff, Henry Stuart	Sports	
The Divorcée	Victor Janson, Rudolf Dworsky	Mady Christians, Marcella Albani	Silent	
The Eleven Schill Officers	Rudolf Meinert	Gustav Adolf Semler, Grete Reinwald	Historical	
Eternal Allegiance	Heinrich Brandt	Otto Gebühr, Claire Rommer	Silent	
Eyes Open, Harry!	Harry Piel	Harry Piel, Denise Legeay	Thriller	
Fadette	Frederic Zelnik	Lya Mara, Yvette Guilbert	Historical	
The Fallen	Rudolf Walther-Fein, Rudolf Dworsky	Asta Nielsen, William Dieterle	Drama	
False Shame	Rudolf Biebrach	Olaf Storm, Frida Richard	Drama	
Faust	F. W. Murnau	Gösta Ekman (senior), Emil Jannings	classic literature/drama	aka Faust - A German Folk Legend
Fedora	Jean Manoussi	Lee Parry, Anita Dorris	Silent	
The Fiddler of Florence	Paul Czinner	Elisabeth Bergner, Conrad Veidt	Comedy	
The Flames Lie	Carl Froelich	Ruth Weyher, Henny Porten	Drama	
The Flight in the Night	Amleto Palermi	Conrad Veidt, Robert Scholz	Silent	
Frauen, die den Weg verloren	Bruno Rahn	Ressel Orla, Frida Richard, Oskar Marion	Drama	
Fräulein Mama	Géza von Bolváry	Grete Reinwald, Walter Janssen, Ferdinand von Alten	Silent	
German Hearts on the German Rhine	Fred Sauer	Gyula Szőreghy, Hans Albers	Silent	
The Girl on a Swing	Felix Basch	Ossi Oswalda, Harry Liedtke	Comedy	
Give My Regards to the Blonde Child on the Rhine	Carl Boese	Walter Slezak, Hanni Reinwald, Frida Richard	Comedy	
The Golden Butterfly	Michael Curtiz	Lili Damita, Nils Asther	Silent	Co-production with Austria
The Good Reputation	Pierre Marodon	Lotte Neumann, Hans Mierendorff	Drama	
Grandstand for General Staff	Hans Otto, Erich Schönfelder	Alexander Roda Roda, Harry Liedtke, Olga Chekhova	Comedy	
The Great Duchess	Willi Wolff	Ellen Richter, Adolf Klein	Silent	
Gretchen Schubert	Karl Moos	Wilhelm Diegelmann, Hermann Picha	Silent	
The Grey House	Friedrich Feher	Magda Sonja, Erna Morena	Silent	
The Heart of a German Mother	Géza von Bolváry	Margarete Kupfer, Heinz Rühmann	Drama	
Hell of Love	Bruno Rahn	Vivian Gibson, Erich Kaiser-Titz, William Dieterle	Drama	
Her Husband's Wife	Felix Basch	Nils Asther, Lucy Doraine	Silent	
Herbstmanöver	Wolfgang Neff	Kurt Vespermann, Hanni Weisse, Hans Heinrich von Twardowski	Silent	
Herr Tartüff	F. W. Murnau	Emil Jannings	Drama	Adaptation of Molière's play
His Toughest Case	Fritz Wendhausen	Alexander Murski, Christa Tordy	Crime	
The Holy Mountain	Arnold Fanck	Leni Riefenstahl, Luis Trenker	Drama	One of many Bergfilme
The House of Lies	Lupu Pick	Werner Krauss, Lucie Höflich	Drama	
Hunted People	Nunzio Malasomma	Carlo Aldini, Maly Delschaft, Hans Albers	Adventure	
The Hunter of Fall	Franz Seitz	Grete Reinwald, William Dieterle	Drama	
I Liked Kissing Women	Bruno Rahn	Alfons Fryland, Elisabeth Pinajeff	Silent	
I Lost My Heart in Heidelberg	Arthur Bergen	Gertrud de Lalsky, Werner Fuetterer	Silent	
I Once Had a Comrade	Conrad Wiene	Erich Kaiser-Titz, Otz Tollen	Silent	
It's Easy to Become a Father	Erich Schönfelder	Lilian Harvey, Harry Halm	Comedy	
The King's Command	Kurt Blachy	Grete Reinwald, Fritz Alberti	Silent	
Kissing Is No Sin	Rudolf Walther-Fein, Rudolf Dworsky	Xenia Desni, Ellen Plessow	Silent	
Die Kleine und ihr Kavalier	Richard Löwenbein	Maly Delschaft, Hilde Jennings, Elisabeth Pinajeff	Silent	
Kubinke the Barber	Carl Boese	Werner Fuetterer, Erika Glässner	Comedy	
Lace	Holger-Madsen	Olaf Fønss, Elisabeth Pinajeff	Crime	
The Last Horse Carriage in Berlin	Carl Boese	Lupu Pick, Maly Delschaft	Comedy	
The Laughing Husband	Rudolf Walther-Fein, Rudolf Dworsky	Livio Pavanelli, Elisabeth Pinajeff, Hans Albers	Silent	
Little Inge and Her Three Fathers	Franz Osten	Dorothea Wieck, Oskar Marion	Comedy	
The Little Variety Star	Hanns Schwarz	Ossi Oswalda, Georg Alexander	Comedy	
Lives in Danger	Karl Gerhardt	Luciano Albertini, Ruth Weyher, Raimondo Van Riel	Adventure	
The Love of the Bajadere	Géza von Bolváry	Karl Falkenberg, Helene von Bolváry	Silent	
Love's Joys and Woes	Kurt Gerron	Charlotte Susa, Margarete Kupfer	Comedy	
Madame Wants No Children	Alexander Korda	María Corda, Harry Liedtke	Drama	
Mademoiselle Josette, My Woman	Gaston Ravel	Dolly Davis, Livio Pavanelli	Comedy	Co-production with France
Malice	Manfred Noa	Paul Wegener, Olga Chekhova	Silent	
The Man in the Fire	Erich Waschneck	Henry Stuart, Olga Chekhova	Silent	
The Man Without Sleep	Carl Boese	Harry Liedtke, Maly Delschaft	Silent	
Manon Lescaut	Arthur Robison	Lya De Putti, Vladimir Gajdarov	Drama	
Marriage Announcement	Fritz Kaufmann	Fritz Kampers, Max Landa	Silent	
Marco's Greatest Gamble	Franz Seitz Sr.	Joe Stöckel, Maria Minzenti	Comedy	
The Master of Death	Hans Steinhoff	Hertha von Walther, Simone Vaudry	Silent	
Maytime	Willi Wolff	Adolf Klein, Ellen Richter	Romance	
Der Meineidbauer	Jacob Fleck, Luise Fleck	Eduard von Winterstein, Elisabeth Markus	Drama	
Michel Strogoff	Victor Tourjansky	Ivan Mozzhukhin, Nathalie Kovanko	Adventure	French-German co-production
The Mill at Sanssouci	Frederic Zelnik, Siegfried Philippi	Otto Gebühr, Jakob Tiedtke	Historical	
My Friend the Chauffeur	Erich Waschneck	Livio Pavanelli, Hans Albers	Silent	
Nanette Makes Everything	Carl Boese	Mady Christians, Georg Alexander	Comedy	
Nixchen	Kurt Blachy	Hans Albers, Olga Limburg	Silent	
One Does Not Play with Love	G. W. Pabst	Werner Krauss, Lili Damita	Drama	
The Ones Down There	Victor Janson	Aud Egede-Nissen, Walter Rilla	Silent	
Only a Dancing Girl	Olof Molander	Lil Dagover, Walter Janssen	Silent	Co-production with Sweden
Orphan of Lowood	Curtis Bernhardt	Evelyn Holt, Olaf Fønss	Drama	
Our Daily Bread	Constantin J. David	Fritz Kampers, Mary Nolan	Drama	
Our Emden	Louis Ralph	Fritz Greiner, John Mylong	War	Remade as a sound film Cruiser Emden in 1932
People to Each Other	Gerhard Lamprecht	Alfred Abel, Aud Egede-Nissen	Drama	
The Pink Diamond	Rochus Gliese	Xenia Desni, Rudolf Klein-Rogge	Comedy	
The Poacher	Johannes Meyer	Heinrich Schroth, Carl de Vogt	Drama	
The Pride of the Company	Georg Jacoby	Reinhold Schünzel, Georg H. Schnell	Comedy	
The Priest from Kirchfeld	Jacob Fleck, Luise Fleck	William Dieterle, Fritz Kampers	Silent	
The Prince and the Dancer	Richard Eichberg	Willy Fritsch, Hans Albers	Silent	
The Princess of the Riviera	Géza von Bolváry	Hans Junkermann, Ellen Kürti	Silent	
Princess Trulala	Erich Schönfelder, Richard Eichberg	Lilian Harvey, Dina Gralla	Comedy	
Professor Imhof	Fred Sauer	Albert Bassermann, Lee Parry	Drama	
The Queen of the Baths	Victor Janson	Mary Nolan, Walter Rilla	Comedy	
The Red Mouse	Rudolf Meinert	Aud Egede-Nissen, Paul Richter	Silent	
The Ride in the Sun	Georg Jacoby	Livio Pavanelli, Paul Heidemann	Silent	
Roses from the South	Carl Froelich	Henny Porten, Angelo Ferrari	Romance	
The Schimeck Family	Alfred Halm, Rudolf Dworsky	Livio Pavanelli, Olga Chekhova	Silent	
Schützenliesel	Rudolf Walther-Fein, Rudolf Dworsky	Xenia Desni, Livio Pavanelli	Comedy	
The Sea Cadet	Carl Boese	Walter Slezak, Gerd Briese	Silent	
The Secret of One Hour	Max Obal	Ernst Reicher, Helena Makowska	Crime	
The Secret of St. Pauli	Rolf Randolf	Maria Matray, Hanni Weisse	Silent	
Secrets of a Soul	G. W. Pabst	Werner Krauss, Ruth Weyher	Drama	
Secret Sinners	Franz Seitz Sr.	Dorothea Wieck, Mary Kid	Silent	
The Seventh Son	Franz Osten	Maria Minzenti, Ferdinand Martini	Drama	
Should We Be Silent?	Richard Oswald	Conrad Veidt, Walter Rilla	Drama	
A Sister of Six	Ragnar Hyltén-Cavallius	Willy Fritsch, Betty Balfour	Comedy	
The Son of Hannibal	Felix Basch	Liane Haid, Alfons Fryland	Silent	
The Song of Life	Arthur Bergen	Carl de Vogt, Angelo Ferrari	Silent	
State Attorney Jordan	Karl Gerhardt	Hans Mierendorff, Hedwig Pauly-Winterstein	Silent	
The Street of Forgetting	Heinz Paul	Hella Moja, Henry Stuart	Silent	
The Student of Prague	Henrik Galeen	Conrad Veidt, Werner Krauss, Elizza La Porta	Drama / Horror	Based on the story by Hanns Heinz Ewers; Remake of the 1913 film The Student of Prague (1913 film)
Superfluous People	Aleksandr Razumny	Camilla von Hollay, Heinrich George	Drama	
The Sweet Girl	Manfred Noa	Mary Nolan, Paul Heidemann, Nils Asther	Silent	
Sword and Shield	Victor Janson, Rudolf Dworsky	Mady Christians, William Dieterle	Historical	
The Tales of Hermann	Kurt Stanke	Margarete Kupfer, Hermann Picha	Comedy	
Tea Time in the Ackerstrasse	Paul L. Stein	Reinhold Schünzel, Mary Nolan	Drama	
The Third Squadron	Carl Wilhelm	Fritz Spira, Eugen Burg	War	
Three Cuckoo Clocks	Lothar Mendes	Lillian Hall-Davis, Nina Vanna	Drama	
The Three Mannequins	Jaap Speyer	Hans Albers, Anton Pointner	Silent	
Torments of the Night	Curtis Bernhardt	Claire Rommer, William Dieterle	Drama	
Trude	Conrad Wiene	Olga Chekhova, Anny Ondra	Comedy	
The Trumpets are Blowing	Carl Boese	Bruno Kastner, Hugo Fischer-Köppe	Silent	
Two and a Lady	Alwin Neuß	Ágnes Esterházy, Bernhard Goetzke	Comedy	
The Uncle from the Provinces	Manfred Noa	Jakob Tiedtke, Margarete Kupfer	Silent	
Uneasy Money	Berthold Viertel	Mary Nolan, Oscar Homolka	Drama	
Unmarried Daughters	Carl Boese	Jenny Jugo, Charlotte Ander	Silent	
Vienna, How it Cries and Laughs	Rudolf Walther-Fein, Rudolf Dworsky	Fritz Greiner, Mady Christians	Silent	
The Violet Eater	Frederic Zelnik	Lil Dagover, Harry Liedtke	Comedy	
Die vom anderen Ufer	Arthur Bergen	Bruno Kastner, Maria Paudler, Colette Brettel	Silent	
Watch on the Rhine	Helene Lackner	Hans Mierendorff, Ernst Winar	Historical	
We Belong to the Imperial-Royal Infantry Regiment	Richard Oswald	Mary Kid, Paul Heidemann	Silent	
We'll Meet Again in the Heimat	Leo Mittler, Reinhold Schünzel	Reinhold Schünzel, Margot Landa	Silent	
When I Came Back	Richard Oswald	Liane Haid, Max Hansen	Silent	
When She Starts, Look Out	Carl Froelich	Henny Porten, Bruno Kastner	Comedy	
The White Geisha	Valdemar Andersen, Karl Heiland	La Jana, Peter Nielsen	Silent	Co-production with Denmark
The White Horse Inn	Richard Oswald	Liane Haid, Max Hansen	Comedy	
White Slave Traffic	Jaap Speyer	Rudolf Klein-Rogge, Erich Kaiser-Titz	Thriller	
Why Get a Divorce?	Manfred Noa	André Mattoni, Vivian Gibson	Comedy	
The Wiskottens	Arthur Bergen	Karl Platen, Harry Liedtke	Silent	
The Woman in Gold	Pierre Marodon	Lotte Neumann, Ernő Verebes	Silent	
The Woman's Crusade	Martin Berger	Conrad Veidt, Maly Delschaft	Drama	
Women and Banknotes	Fritz Kaufmann	Ruth Weyher, Angelo Ferrari	Silent	
Women of Passion	Rolf Randolf,	Fern Andra, Fritz Spira	Silent	
The Wooing of Eve	Max Mack	Ossi Oswalda, Willy Fritsch	Comedy	
The World Wants To Be Deceived	Peter Paul Felner	Harry Liedtke, Georg Alexander	Comedy	
Wrath of the Seas	Manfred Noa	Bernhard Goetzke, Ágnes Esterházy, Nils Asther	War	
Young Blood	Manfred Noa	Lya De Putti, Walter Slezak	Drama	
The Young Man from the Ragtrade	Richard Löwenbein	Curt Bois, Maria Paudler	Comedy	

== Documentaries ==
Title	Director	Featured cast	Genre	Note
Auf Tierfang in Abessinien	Ernst Garden		documentary	
Aus der Waffenschmiede der SPD	Gertrud David		documentary	
Berliner Stilleben	László Moholy-Nagy		documentary	
Die Biene Maja und ihre Abenteuer	Waldemar Bonsels, Wolfram Junghans		documentary	
Das Blumenwunder	Max Reichmann		documentary	
Ein Freitag Abend	Gertrud David		documentary	
Schaffende Hände: Wassily Kandinsky in der Galerie Neumann-Nierendorf	Hans Cürlis		documentary	
Die Schwester vom Roten Kreuz - Ein Lebenslauf	Gertrud David		documentary	
Wie werde ich Mitglied im Konsumverein?	Gertrud David		documentary	

== Animation ==
Title	Director	Featured cast	Genre	Note
The Adventures of Prince Achmed	Lotte Reiniger		Animation / Fantasy	Oldest-surviving animated feature film IMDb
Der Arm	Hans Fischerkoesen		Animation	
Der Aufstieg	Walter Ruttmann, Julius Pinschwer		Animation	
Durch Schaden wird man klug	Arthur Kraska		Animation	
Raumlichtkunst	Oskar Fischinger		animation	
Rebus Film Nr. 4	Paul Leni		animation	
Rebus Film Nr. 5	Paul Leni		animation	
Rebus Film Nr. 6	Paul Leni		animation	
Rebus Film Nr. 7	Paul Leni		animation	
Rebus Film Nr. 8	Paul Leni		animation	
In Schneekönigs Reich	Ewald Mathias Schumacher		Animation	
Spiel der Wellen	Walter Ruttmann, Lotte Lendesdorff		Animation	
Spirals	Oskar Fischinger		experimental	
Wambus Rettung	Georg Germroth		animation	
