= Archduke Johann Salvator of Austria =

Austrian archduke (1852–1890)

Archduke Johann Salvator
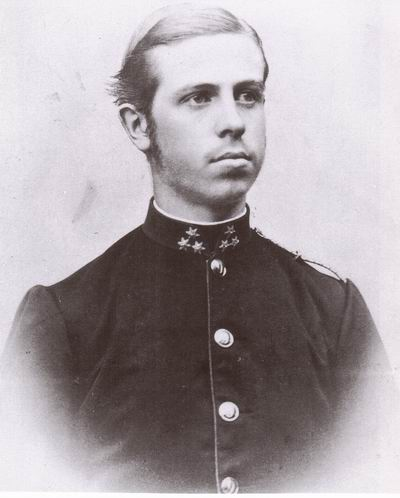
- Johann Salvator c. 1870–80
- Born: 25 November 1852; Florence, Grand Duchy of Tuscany
- Spouse: Ludmilla ("Milli") Stubel (m. 1889–1890)
Names
- Giovanni Nepomuceno Maria Annunziata Giuseppe Giovanni Batista Ferdinando Baldassare Luigi Gonzaga Pietro Alessandrino Zanobi Antonino
- House: Habsburg-Lorraine
- Father: Leopold II, Grand Duke of Tuscany
- Mother: Princess Maria Antonia of the Two Sicilies
- Disappeared: c. 12 July 1890 (aged 37); Cape Horn (presumed)
- Status: Declared dead in absentia on 2 February 1911

Archduke Johann Salvator of Austria (German: Johann Salvator, Italian: Giovanni Salvatore; 25 November 1852 - presumed dead, July 1890; declared dead in absentia 2 February 1911) was a member of the Tuscan branch of the House of Habsburg-Lorraine. He was Archduke and Prince of Austria, Prince of Hungary, Bohemia and Tuscany. After renouncing those titles, he was known as Johann (John) Orth. He disappeared while sailing with his wife in July 1890 and is believed to have died when his ship encountered a storm near Cape Horn. Archduke Salvator was declared dead in absentia in February 1911.

== Early life ==
Archduke Johann Salvator was born in Florence, the youngest son of Leopold II, Grand Duke of Tuscany and his second wife, Princess Maria Antonia of the Two Sicilies. He was baptized in Florence's Battistero di San Giovanni as Giovanni Nepomuceno Maria Annunziata Giuseppe Giovanni Batista Ferdinando Baldassare Luigi Gonzaga Pietro Alessandrino Zanobi Antonino. He pursued a career in the Austrian Army and was a good friend of Rudolf, Crown Prince of Austria, with both sharing liberal opinions.

After Bulgaria was granted autonomy by the Ottoman Empire, Johann Salvator was an unsuccessful candidate for the throne. Prince Alexander of Battenberg would be elected Prince of Bulgaria in 1879. During the Austro-Hungarian occupation of Ottoman Bosnia and Herzegovina in 1878, he was put in command of a division of the occupying army and won numerous honours.

On 16 October 1889, he resigned his army commission and renounced his title and the privileges he enjoyed as a member of the Austrian imperial family. After renouncing his titles he assumed the name "Johann (or John) Orth", the surname Orth derived from the name of a castle he had owned, Schloss Orth.

== Disappearance ==
In 1889, Johann Salvator married Ludmilla ("Milli") Stubel, an opera dancer in London. Shortly after his marriage, he purchased a ship named the Santa Margareta, on which he and his wife sailed for South America. In February 1890 he set off from Montevideo, Uruguay, heading for Valparaíso in Chile. He was last seen on 12 July in Cape Tres Puntas, Argentina. It is believed that his ship was lost during a storm off the coast of Cape Horn. He was officially declared dead on 2 February 1911 in Vienna. His possessions were disposed of in 1912.

In the years following Salvator's disappearance, numerous sightings of him were reported. Rumors persisted that he and his wife sailed to South America and assumed new identities. Several men also came forward claiming to be the "missing Duke". One of the more publicised claims came in May 1945 when a German born lithographer living in Kristiansand, Norway, named Alexander Hugo Køhler made a deathbed confession claiming that he was Johann Salvator. Køhler claimed that, as Johann Orth, he "bought" the identity of Alexander Hugo Køhler and assumed his life. Køhler claimed that the real Alexander Hugo Køhler posed as Salvator and it was he who died at sea.

=== Theories from family members ===
In her 1911 memoirs, his niece Louise, Crown Princess of Saxony, claims that her uncle was close to her, and even tried to get a special dispensation from the Vatican in order to marry her. She then writes that her uncle sought to reorganize the army by way of a manifesto, for which he had consulted many, but not Archduke Albrecht, Duke of Teschen, the Commander in Chief. She claims that Franz Joseph took Teschen's side in the argument and banished Johann Salvator, who adopted the new name, married, and faked his death. Louise claims that her father, Grand Duke Ferdinand IV, believed his brother was still alive until his own death in 1908, and Louise herself believed him to be in Argentina, waiting to return after Franz Joseph's death.

Louise's brother Leopold Ferdinand agreed with her theory, but acknowledged that by the time Franz Joseph died and the First World War commenced, his uncle must be dead, for "Death alone could have prevented so gallant a patriot from returning to his beloved native land in that dark hour of need."

In her controversial 1913 memoir, his distant relative Marie Larisch claimed that his disappearance was connected with Crown Prince Rudolf's suicide, known as the Mayerling incident. Specifically, she claims that Rudolf and Johann Salvator had plotted a coup together to make Rudolf king of Hungary, and that, fearing discovery, Rudolf had killed himself and Johann Salvator had fled the country and faked his own death.

== Films about the Johann Orth mystery ==
- Das Geheimnis der Santa Margherita (dir. Rolf Randolf, 1921)
- A Vanished World (dir. Alexander Korda, 1922)
- The Secret of Johann Orth (dir. Willi Wolff, 1932)
- The Red Prince (dir. Hans Schott-Schöbinger, 1954)

== See also ==
- List of people who disappeared mysteriously at sea
