= Memoirs of a Nun =

1927 film

- Directed by: Arthur Bergen
- Written by: Arthur Bergen; Ernst Iros
- Starring: Mary Nolan
- Cinematography: Franz Koch
- Music by: Hans May
- Production company: Münchner Lichtspielkunst
- Distributed by: Süd-Film
- Release date: 24 February 1927
- Country: Germany
- Languages: Silent; German intertitles

Memoirs of a Nun (German: Erinnerungen einer Nonne) is a 1927 German silent drama film directed by Arthur Bergen and starring Mary Nolan.

The film's sets were designed by the art director Ludwig Reiber. It was made at the Emelka Studios in Berlin.

== Cast ==
- Mary Nolan
- Camilla von Hollay
- Werner Pittschau
- Ellen Kürti
- Georg John
