= Lieutenant, Were You Once a Hussar? =

1930 film

- Directed by: Manfred Noa
- Written by: [eter Herz; Armin Robinson; Fritz Rotter
- Starring: Mady Christians; Gustav Diessl; Georg Alexander
- Cinematography: Frederik Fuglsang
- Music by: Willy Krauß; Robert Stolz
- Production company: Aafa-Film
- Distributed by: Aafa-Film
- Release date: 29 October 1930
- Running time: 86 minutes
- Country: Germany
- Language: German

Lieutenant, Were You Once a Hussar? (German: Leutnant warst Du einst bei den Husaren) is a 1930 German comedy film directed by Manfred Noa and starring Mady Christians, Gustav Diessl and Georg Alexander. It was made as a MLV with a separate French version My Heart Incognito being released the following year.

== Cast ==
- Mady Christians as Königin Alexandra von Gregorien
- Gustav Diessl as Fedor Karew
- Georg Alexander as Prince Vicky
- Lotte Spira as Katharina Hofdame
- Gretl Theimer as Mimi
- Max Ehrlich as Ben Knox
- Hermann Picha as Der Wirt
- Max Ralph-Ostermann as Ministerpräsident
- Paul Rehkopf
- Bernd Aldor as Revolutionär
- Max Greiner as Revolutionär
- Hermann Blaß
- Dajos Bela as Violin player
- Fritz Greiner

== Bibliography ==
- Schöning, Jörg (1995). Fantaisies russes: russische Filmmacher in Berlin und Paris, 1920–1930 [Russian Fantasies: Russian Filmmakers in Berlin and Paris]. Edition Text + Kritik. ISBN 978-3-88377-509-8.
