= My Heart Incognito =

1931 film

- Directed by: André-Paul Antoine; Manfred Noa
- Written by: André-Paul Antoine; Bobby E. Lüthge
- Starring: Mady Christians
- Cinematography: Frederik Fuglsang
- Music by: Willy Krauß; Werner Schmidt-Boelcke; Robert Stolz
- Production company: Aafa-Film
- Release date: 16 January 1931
- Running time: 87 minutes
- Country: Germany
- Language: French

My Heart Incognito (French: Mon coeur incognito) is a 1931 comedy film directed by André-Paul Antoine and Manfred Noa and starring Mady Christians. It was made by Germany's Aafa-Film as the French-language version of Lieutenant, Were You Once a Hussar?. Such multi-language versions were common during the early years of sound.

== Cast ==
- Jean Angelo
- Mady Christians
- [Lucette Desmoulins
- Florelle
- Jim Gérald
- Jacques Henley
- Maurice Lagrenée
- Marcel Lesieur
- Marthe Sarbel
- Roger Tréville

== Bibliography ==
- Bock, Hans-Michael; Bergfelder, Tim, eds. (2009). The Concise Cinegraph: Encyclopaedia of German Cinema. New York: Berghahn Books. ISBN 978-1-57181-655-9.
