= Werner Pittschau =

German actor (1902–1928)

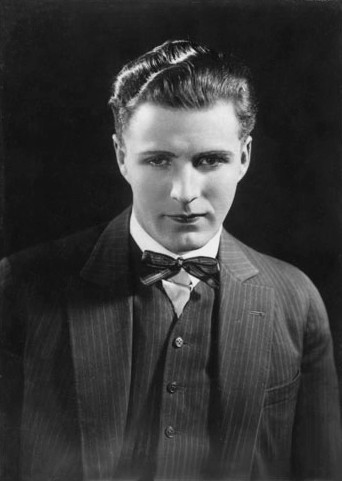
- Pittschau, ca. 1924
- Born: 24 March 1902; Berlin, German Empire
- Died: 28 October 1928 (aged 26); Gerdshagen, Brandenburg, Weimar Republic
- Occupation: Actor
- Years active: 1919–1928
- Relatives: Ernst Pittschau (half-brother)

Werner Pittschau (24 March 1902 – 28 October 1928) was a German theatre and film actor of the silent film era. During the 1920s, he was a leading man in 30 films with famous film partners (Asta Nielsen, Anny Ondra, Tamara Karsavina, Renate Brausewetter, Carmen Cartellieri, Dina Gralla, Mady Christians, Carla Bartheel etc.), but his career was cut short by his death in an automobile accident, at the age of 26.

== Early life and career ==
Pittschau was the son of the German theatre actor Ernst Pittschau sen. (1859–1916) and the Viennese theatre and film actress Hilde Hofer-Pittschau née Schützenhofer (1873–1961). His older half-brothers were the actor Ernst Pittschau (1883–1951) and the actor Walther Pittschau (1889–1946). He began his career after short training in 1919 as an actor at the Deutsches Landestheater in Prague. He left Prague in 1924 to continue his career in Berlin, where he played in the Schiller Theater. During this time, he started to work also in movies. Pittschau's film debut in 1924/25 was a leading role in the picture The Clever Fox (director: Conrad Wiene). He followed this 1925 with an appearance in Anne-Liese of Dessau with Maly Delschaft and Hanseatics with Tamara Karsavina. (Continuation see filmography below)

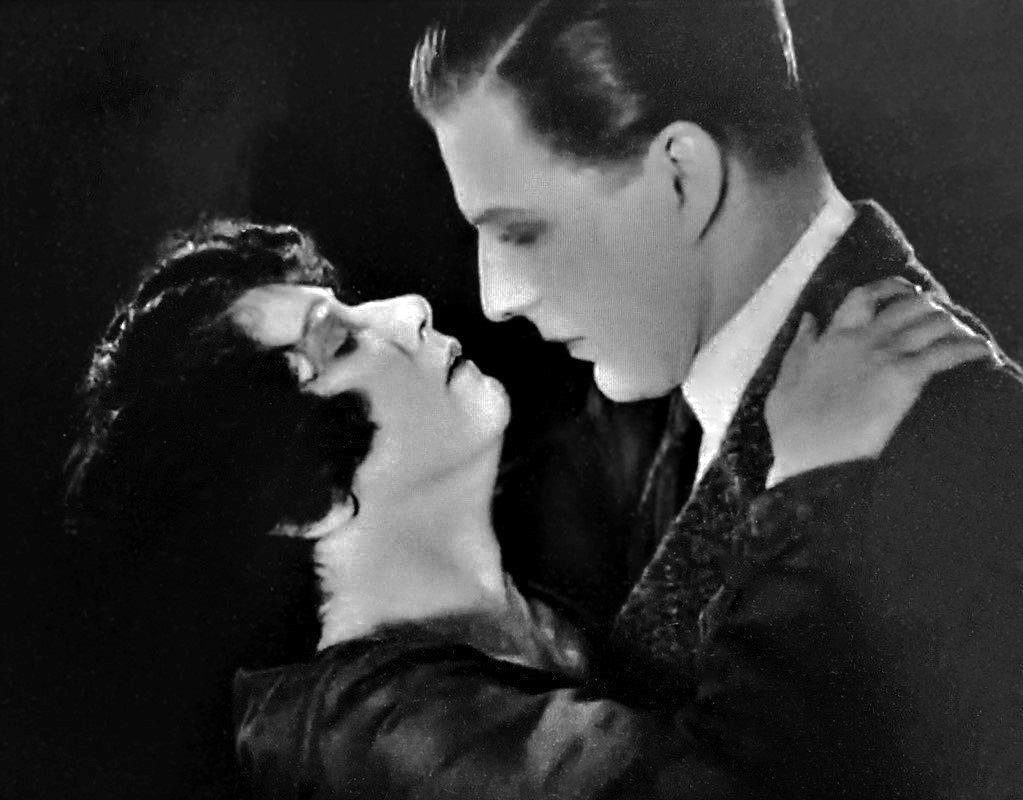
Tamara Karsavina, Werner Pittschau, still, in the 1925 film Hanseaten

== Death ==
On Sunday, 28 October 1928, Werner Pittschau and his girlfriend, dancer Wilma Harmening, were driving from Berlin to Mecklenburg when Harmening or Pittschau lost control of the vehicle and collided into a tree near the village of Gerdshagen. The vehicle overturned several times. When the accident was discovered, Pittschau was already deceased. Harmening died at the scene shortly after help arrived. Both Pittschau and Harmening were buried at the Friedhof Heerstraße cemetery in Berlin. However, their graves have not been preserved.

== Selected filmography ==
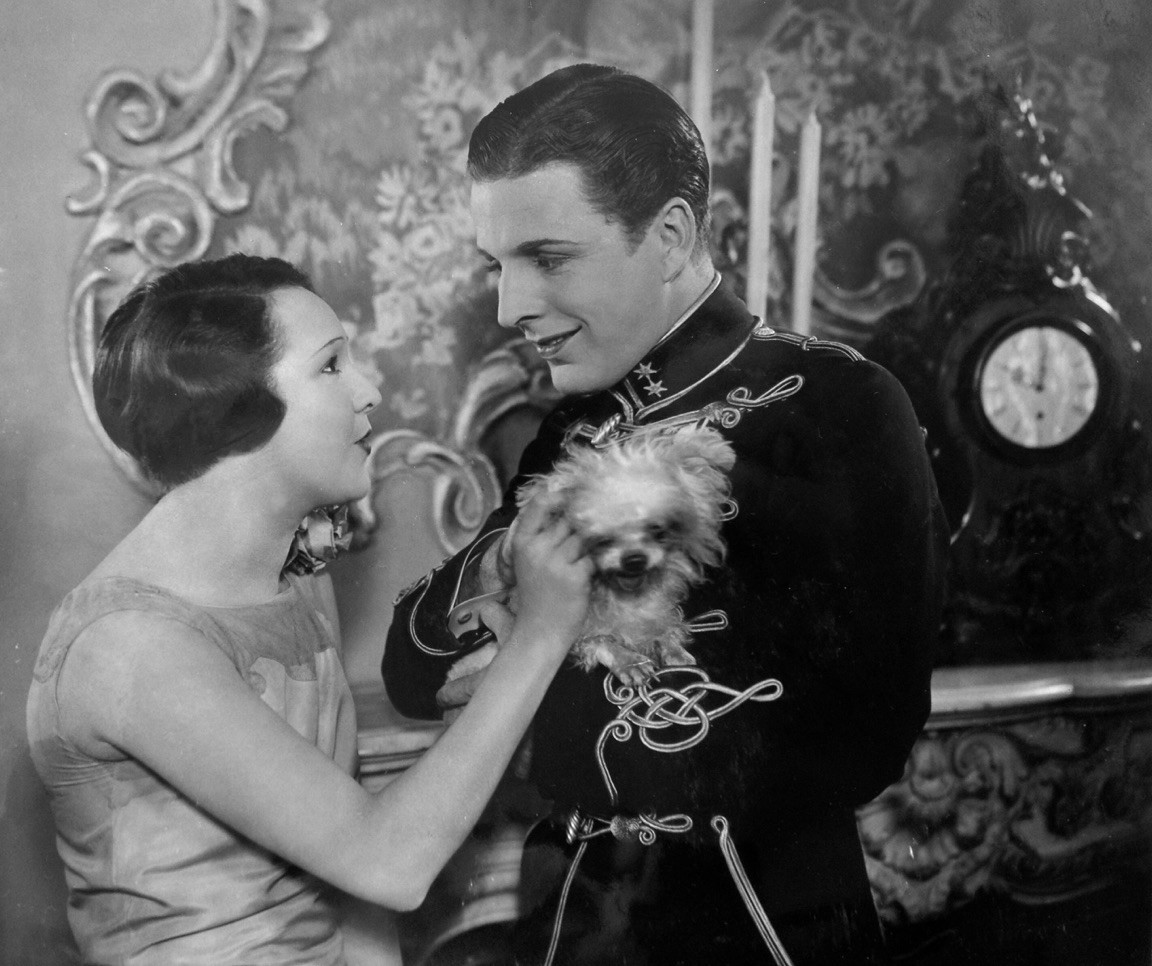
Dina Gralla and Pittschau in the 1926 film Der Balletterzherzog

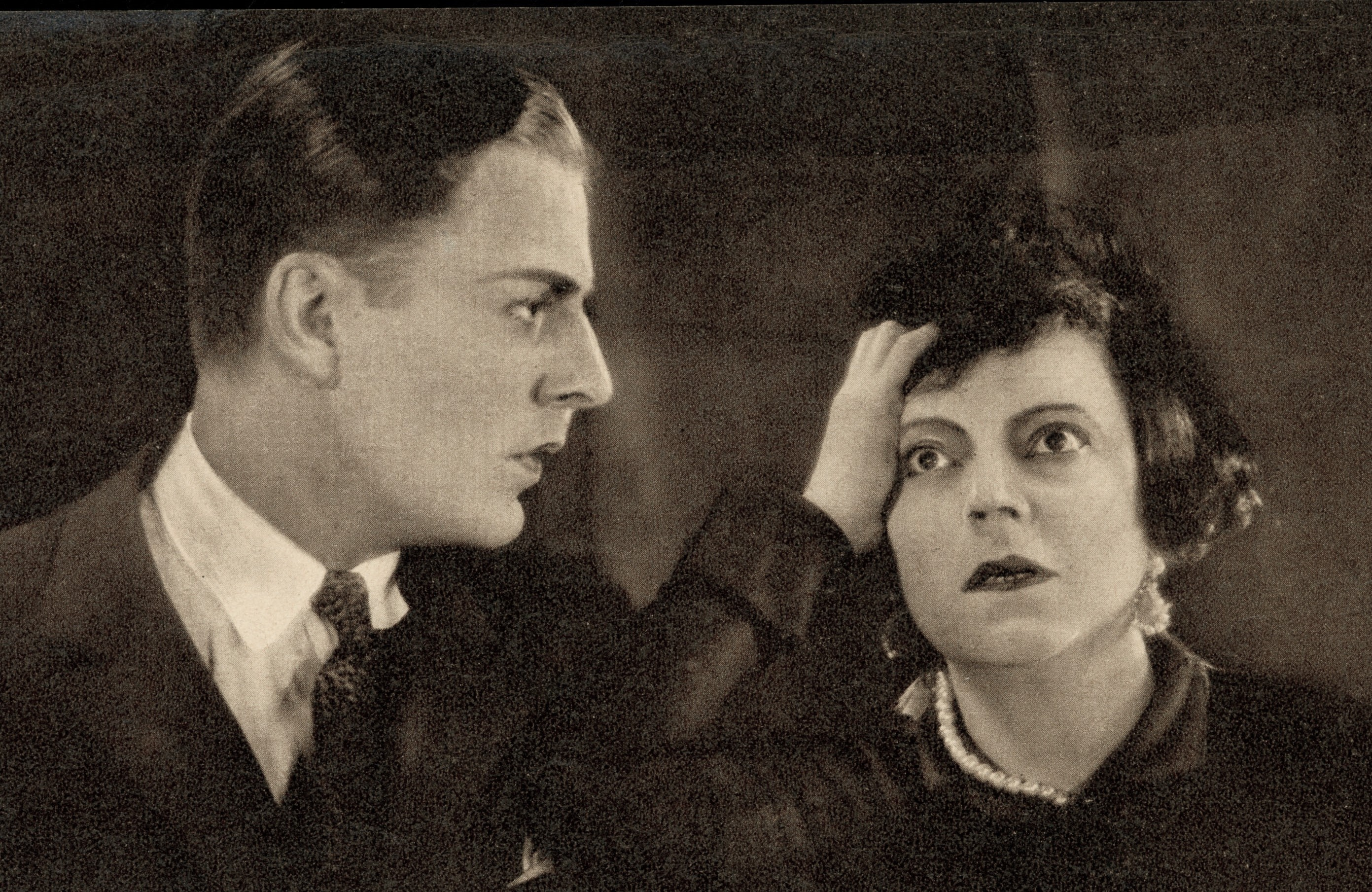
Asta Nielsen, Werner Pittschau, Asta Nielsen in the 1927 film Tragedy of the Street

- The Clever Fox (1925)
- The Iron Bride (1925)
- The Hanseatics (1925)
- Anne-Liese of Dessau (1925)
- Women of Luxury (1925)
- People in Need (1925)
- The Last Horse Carriage in Berlin (1926)
- The Pride of the Company (1926)
- The Wiskottens (1926)
- Wrath of the Seas (1926)
- Vienna, How it Cries and Laughs (1926)
- The Eleven Schill Officers (1926)
- Der Balletterzherzog aka Virtue (1926)
- Sacco und Vanzetti (1927)
- Tragedy of the Street (1927)
- A Murderous Girl (1927)
- Tragedy at the Royal Circus (1928)
- Kaiserjäger (1928)
- The White Sonata (1928)
- Archduke John (1929, posthumous release)
- Sister Maria (1929, posthumous release)
- Street Acquaintances (1929, posthumous release)
