= Brausewetter =

Brausewetter is a German surname. Notable people with the surname include:

- Hans Brausewetter (1899–1945), German silent film actor
- Michael Brausewetter
- Renate Brausewetter (1905–2006), German silent film actress, younger sister of Hans Brausewetter
