= One Against All =

1927 film

- Directed by: Nunzio Malasomma
- Written by: Curt J. Braun
- Produced by: Carlo Aldini
- Starring: Carlo Aldini; Hanni Reinwald; Carl Auen
- Cinematography: Reimar Kuntze; Mois Safra
- Music by: Willy Schmidt-Gentner
- Production company: Carlo Aldini-Film
- Distributed by: Trianon-Film
- Release date: 23 March 1927
- Country: Germany
- Languages: Silent; German intertitles

One Against All (German: Einer gegen alle) is a 1927 German silent film directed by Nunzio Malasomma and starring Carlo Aldini, Hanni Reinwald and Carl Auen.

The film's art direction was by Max Heilbronner.

== Cast ==
In alphabetical order

- Carlo Aldini
- Carl Auen
- Inge Borg
- Michael Chekhov
- Wilhelm Diegelmann
- Karl Falkenberg
- Georg Georgi
- Maria Mindzenty
- Hermann Picha
- Hanni Reinwald
- Albert Steinrück
- Sylvia Torf
- Ruth Weyher
