= Gabriel Levy =

German film producer

- Born: 26 May 1881; Mainz, German Empire
- Died: 26 March 1965 (aged 83); Amsterdam, Netherlands
- Occupation: Producer
- Years active: 1921–1948

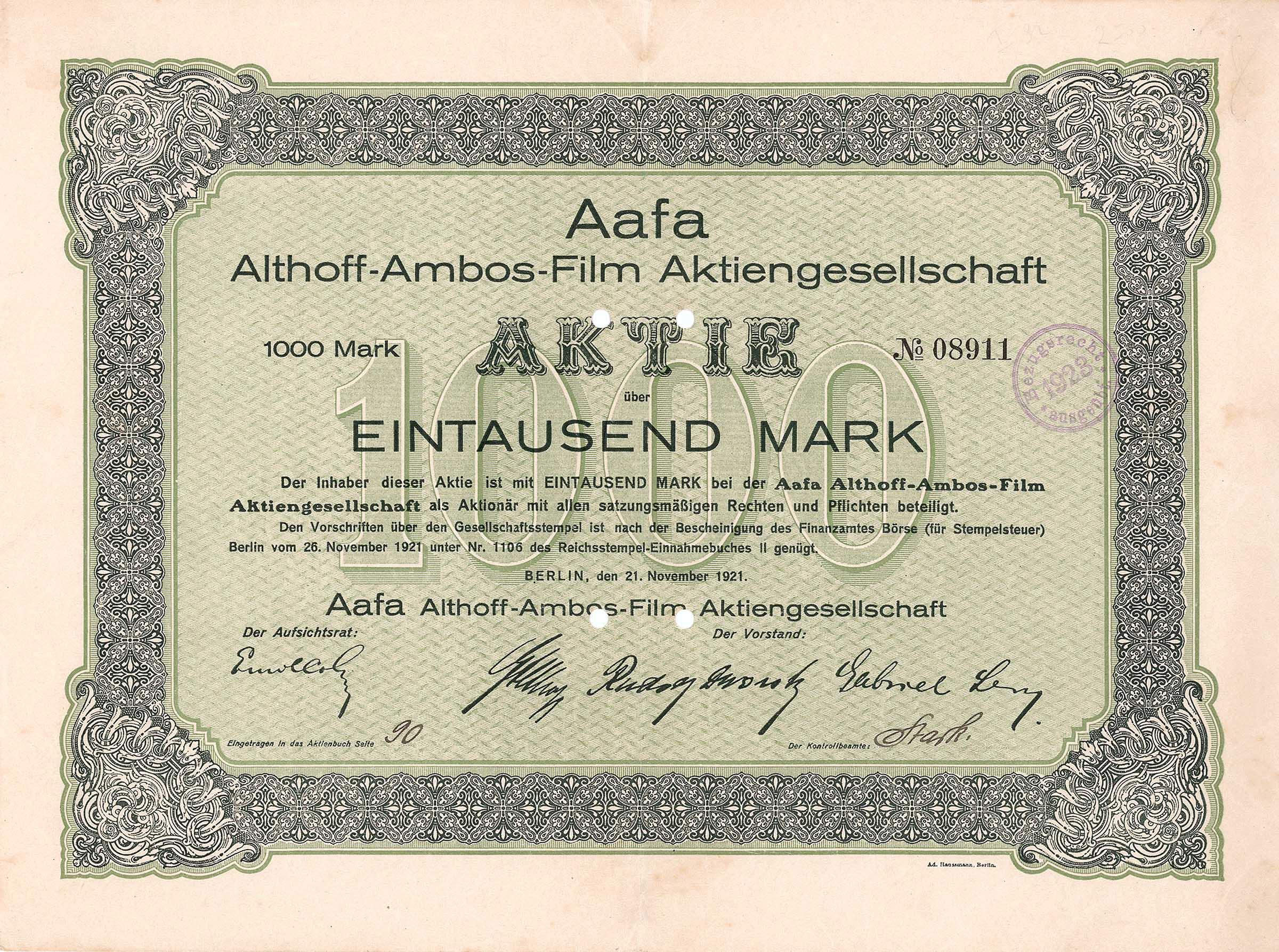
Share of the Aafa Althoff-Ambos-Film AG, issued 21 November 1921; signed by the principals Rudolf Dworsky and Gabriel Levy

Gabriel Levy (26 May 1881 – 26 March 1965) was a German film producer who was associated with the company Aafa-Film during the 1920s and 1930s. Following the Nazi takeover of power in 1933, Levy, a Jew, lost control of the company and was forced into exile in the Netherlands.

== Selected filmography ==
- In the Valleys of the Southern Rhine (1925)
- The Fallen (1926)
- Sword and Shield (1926)
- The Schimeck Family (1926)
- Weekend Magic (1927)
- The Insurmountable (1928)
- The Criminal of the Century (1928)
- Darling of the Dragoons (1928)
- Tempo! Tempo! (1929)
- Hungarian Nights (1929)
- Danube Waltz (1930)
- The Corvette Captain (1930)
- The Fate of Renate Langen (1931)
- The Woman They Talk About (1931)
- The Beggar Student (1931)
- Peace of Mind (1931)
- My Heart Longs for Love (1931)
- Adventures in the Engadin (1932)
- Once There Was a Waltz (1932)
- Two Lucky Days (1932)
- Theodor Körner (1932)
- The Blue of Heaven (1932)
- Distorting at the Resort (1932)
- The Dancer of Sanssouci (1932)
- The Emperor's Waltz (1933)
- Two Good Comrades (1933)
