= The Sea (1927 film) =

1927 film

- Directed by: Peter Paul Felner
- Written by: Peter Paul Felner; Bernhard Kellermann
- Starring: Heinrich George; Olga Chekhova; Simone Vaudry
- Cinematography: Léon Wladimir Batifol; Leopold Kutzleb
- Music by: Walter Ulfig
- Production company: Peter Paul Felner-Film
- Distributed by: Sofar-Film
- Release date: 1 April 1927
- Running time: 103 minutes
- Country: Germany
- Languages: Silent; German intertitles

The Sea (German: Das Meer) is a 1927 German silent drama film directed by Peter Paul Felner and starring Heinrich George, Olga Chekhova, and Simone Vaudry. It was shot at the Staaken Studios in Berlin. The film's sets were designed by the art director Robert Neppach.

== Synopsis ==
Rosseherre, a young girl living on a remote island off the Brittany coast falls in love and married Captain Yann. However she is intriguied by a sophisticated stranger she encounters and becomes entranced by him. When she sees him kissing another woman, her enraged jealousy leads her to try and trick her husband into killing the man as a potential love rival.

== Cast ==
- Heinrich George as Yann
- Olga Chekhova as Rosseherre
- Simone Vaudry as Yvonne
- Anton Pointner as Fremder
- Arthur Strasser
- Charles Barrois as Kedril

== Bibliography ==
- Hans-Michael Bock and Tim Bergfelder. The Concise Cinegraph: An Encyclopedia of German Cinema. Berghahn Books.
