= Anne-Liese of Dessau =

1925 film directed by James Bauer

- Directed by: James Bauer
- Written by: Marcell Freytag; Armin Petersen
- Starring: Maly Delschaft; Werner Pittschau; Julia Serda
- Cinematography: Sophus Wangøe
- Production company: Vicor-Film
- Release date: 18 September 1925
- Country: Germany
- Languages: Silent; German intertitles

Anne-Liese of Dessau (German: Die Anne-Liese von Dessau) is a 1925 German silent historical film directed by James Bauer and starring Maly Delschaft, Werner Pittschau and Julia Serda. It portrays the life of Anna Louise Föhse.

The film's sets were designed by Robert A. Dietrich.

== Cast ==
- Maly Delschaft
- Werner Pittschau
- Julia Serda
- Hermann Böttcher
- Fritz Richard
- Valy Arnheim
- Otto Reinwald
- Harry Grunwald
- Waldemar Potier

== Bibliography ==
- Grange, William (2008). Cultural Chronicle of the Weimar Republic. Lanham, MD: Scarecrow Press. ISBN 978-0-8108-5967-8.
