= Max Hiller =

German actor (1889–1948)

- Born: Julius Wilhelm Max Hiller; 8 December 1889; Berlin, German Empire
- Died: 17 December 1948 (aged 59); Wilmersdorf (Berlin), Allied-occupied Germany
- Other name: Max W. Hiller
- Occupation: Actor
- Years active: 1917-1948

Max Hiller (8 December 1889 – 17 December 1948) was a German stage and film actor. He appeared in more than thirty films from 1917 to 1948.

== Selected filmography ==
Year	Title	Role	Notes
1944	The Buchholz Family		
1938	The Blue Fox		
1938	Nanon		
1937	Unternehmen Michael	English prisoner	
1930	The Last Company		
1926	The Sweet Girl		
1925	Fire of Love	Franz	
1924	The Last Laugh		
