= Den of Iniquity =

1925 film

- Directed by: Constantin J. David
- Written by: Constantin J. David (play); Mutz Greenbaum
- Starring: Reinhold Schünzel; Jack Trevor; Maly Delschaft
- Cinematography: Mutz Greenbaum
- Music by: Eduard Riemann
- Production company: Greenbaum-Film
- Distributed by: Bavaria Film
- Release date: 30 April 1925
- Country: Germany
- Languages: Silent; German intertitles

Den of Iniquity (German: Sündenbabel) is a 1925 German silent film directed by Constantin J. David and starring Reinhold Schünzel, Jack Trevor and Maly Delschaft.

The film's sets were designed by the art director Alfred Junge.

== Cast ==
- Reinhold Schünzel as Emil Stiebel
- Jack Trevor as Hellmuth Roeder
- Maly Delschaft as Loni, seine Frau
- Hans Brausewetter as Hans Lengefeld
- Arnold Korff as John Benningsen
- Barbara von Annenkoff as Madame Marion
- Anna Müller-Lincke as Frau Tietze
- Renate Brausewetter as Erna Tietze
- Kurt Vespermann as Gustav
- Frida Richard as Reinemachefrau
- Eugen Rex
- Gretl Schubert
- Grete Kerstein

== Bibliography ==
- Hans-Michael Bock and Tim Bergfelder. The Concise Cinegraph: An Encyclopedia of German Cinema. Berghahn Books, 2009.
