= The Woman They Talk About =

1931 film

- Directed by: Victor Janson
- Written by: Hans Rameau
- Based on: Daniel by Louis Verneuil
- Produced by: Gabriel Levy
- Starring: Mady Christians; Hans Stüwe; Lilian Ellis
- Cinematography: Guido Seeber
- Edited by: Ladislao Vajda
- Music by: Fritz Goldschmidt
- Production company: Aafa-Film
- Distributed by: Aafa-Film
- Release date: 18 August 1931
- Running time: 88 minutes
- Country: Germany
- Language: German

The Woman They Talk About (German: Die Frau von der man spricht) is a 1931 German drama film directed by Victor Janson and starring Mady Christians, Hans Stüwe and Lilian Ellis. The film's art direction was by Botho Hoefer and Bernhard Schwidewski. It is based on the play Daniel by Louis Verneuil.

== Cast ==
- Mady Christians as Vera Moretti
- Hans Stüwe as René Bennett
- Lilian Ellis as Dina Kent
- S.Z. Sakall as Salewski Moretti
- Otto Wallburg as Greven
- Carl Goetz as Dr. Wilson
- Ernst Dernburg as Mr. Bennett
- Alexander Sascha as Marquis von Kent
- Frank Günther as Severac
- Kitty Meinhardt as Louise
- Harry Nestor as Chauffeur Robert

== Bibliography ==
- Waldman, Harry. Nazi Films in America, 1933-1942. McFarland, 2008.
