= The Untouched Woman =

1925 German silent film

- Directed by: Constantin J. David
- Written by: Constantin J. David
- Starring: Mary Nolan; Tamara Geva; Alf Blütecher
- Cinematography: Mutz Greenbaum
- Production company: Greenbaum-Film
- Distributed by: Bavaria Film
- Release date: 10 December 1925
- Country: Germany
- Languages: Silent; German intertitles

The Untouched Woman (German: Die unberührte Frau) is a 1925 German silent film directed by Constantin J. David and starring Mary Nolan, Tamara Geva, and Alf Blütecher. The film's sets were designed by the art director Karl Görge.

== Cast ==
- Mary Nolan as Marcelle Vautier
- Tamara Geva as Jane, ihre Mutter
- Alf Blütecher as Roger Clermont
- Harry Halm as Lucien, sein Bruder
- Jeanne de Balzac as Colette Duflos
- Hans Junkermann as Casimir Lebrun
- Hans Behrendt as André, Luciens Freund
- Ulrich Bettac as Jasmin Potfin

== Bibliography ==
- Hans-Michael Bock and Tim Bergfelder. The Concise Cinegraph: An Encyclopedia of German Cinema. Berghahn Books, 2009.
