= The Fate of Renate Langen =

1931 film

- Directed by: Rudolf Walther-Fein
- Written by: Bobby E. Lüthge
- Produced by: Gabriel Levy
- Starring: Mady Christians; Francis Lederer; Hilde Hildebrand
- Cinematography: Frederik Fuglsang
- Edited by: Ladislao Vajda
- Music by: Felix Gunther; Friedrich Hollaender; Rudolf Nelson
- Production company: Aafa-Film
- Distributed by: Aafa-Film
- Release date: 11 February 1931
- Running time: 100 minutes
- Country: Germany
- Language: German

The Fate of Renate Langen (German: Das Schicksal der Renate Langen) is a 1931 German drama film directed by Rudolf Walther-Fein and starring Mady Christians, Francis Lederer and Hilde Hildebrand. It was shot at the Tempelhof Studios in Berlin and on location on the Baltic coast. The film's sets were designed by the art directors Botho Höfer and Bernhard Schwidewski.

== Synopsis ==
Renate lives a comfortable but unexciting life as the wife of a doctor Walter Langen with a son Peter. When she meets the younger, handsome Gerd she begins an affair with her that offers her the passion she craves. She encounters her lover in clandestine meetings that she conceals from her husband, but faces social ruin and the breakup of her family when her secret is exposed at last.

== Cast ==
- Mady Christians as Renate Langen
- Francis Lederer as Gerd
- Hilde Hildebrand as Marion
- Alfred Abel as Dr. Walter Langen
- Rolf Drucker as Peter, Sohn der Familie Langen
- Heinrich Schroth as Schrott
- Gustav Rickelt as Kapitän Haase
- Hans Sternberg as Bollmann
- Viktor Senger as Rechtsanwalt
- Hermann Picha as Detective

== Bibliography ==
- Bock, Hans-Michael; Bergfelder, Tim, eds. (2009). The Concise Cinegraph: Encyclopaedia of German Cinema. Berghahn Books. ISBN 978-1-57181-655-9.
- Waldman, Harry. Nazi Films in America, 1933-1942. McFarland, 2008.
