= Carnival Magic (1927 film) =

1927 film

- Directed by: Rudolf Walther-Fein; Rudolf Dworsky
- Written by: Walter Reisch
- Starring: Harry Liedtke; Grete Mosheim; Emil Rameau
- Cinematography: Willy Hameister
- Music by: Felix Bartsch
- Production company: Aafa-Film
- Distributed by: Aafa-Film
- Release date: 1 February 1927
- Running time: 107 minutes
- Country: Germany
- Languages: Silent; German intertitles

Carnival Magic (German: Faschingszauber) is a 1927 German silent comedy film directed by Rudolf Walther-Fein and Rudolf Dworsky and starring Harry Liedtke, Grete Mosheim, and Emil Rameau. It was shot at the Staaken Studios in Berlin. The film's sets were designed by the art directors Hans Minzloff and Jacek Rotmil.

== Cast ==
- Harry Liedtke as Willy Cart
- Grete Mosheim as Edith Vallon
- Emil Rameau as Der Großvater
- Frida Richard as Die Großmutter
- Grit Haid as Venda Patrick
- Adolphe Engers as Bruder Zwillinger, Vendas Verehrer
- Wilhelm Bendow as Bruder Zwillinger, Vendas Verehrer
- Paul Biensfeldt as August Kilian
- Margarete Kupfer as Anny Kiliane
- Robert Leffler as Justizrat Blame
- Jaro Fürth as Der Arzt

== Bibliography ==
- Grange, William (2008). Cultural Chronicle of the Weimar Republic. Lanham, MD: Scarecrow Press. ISBN 978-0-8108-5967-8.
