= The Earl of Essex (film) =

1922 film

- German release poster
- Directed by: Peter Paul Felner
- Written by: Peter Paul Felner; Louis Rokos
- Starring: Eugen Klöpfer; Fritz Kortner; Werner Krauss; Eva May
- Cinematography: Karl Hasselmann; Fritz Stein; Fritz Arno Wagner
- Production company: National Film
- Release date: 14 September 1922
- Country: Germany
- Languages: Silent; German intertitles

The Earl of Essex (German: Der Graf von Essex) is a 1922 German silent historical film directed by Peter Paul Felner and starring Eugen Klöpfer, Fritz Kortner and Werner Krauss. It was loosely based on the 1761 play Der Graf von Essex by Peter von Stüven set in Elizabethan England and based in turn on the 1678 work Le Comte d'Essex by Thomas Corneille.

== Cast ==
- Eugen Klöpfer - Earl of Essex
- Fritz Kortner - Lord Nottingham
- Werner Krauss
- Friedrich Kühne - Cecil
- Eva May - Lady Rutland
- Erna Morena - Lady Nottingham
- Charles Puffy - Cuff
- Magnus Stifter - Lord Southampton
- Agnes Straub - Queen Elisabeth I
- Rosa Valetti
- Ferdinand von Alten - Raleigh

== Bibliography ==
- Bergfelder, Tim & Bock, Hans-Michael. The Concise Cinegraph: Encyclopedia of German. Berghahn Books, 2009.
