= Fritz Rotter =

Austrian writer and composer (1900–1984)

- Born: 3 March 1900; Vienna, Austro-Hungarian Empire
- Died: 11 April 1984 (aged 84); Ascona, Switzerland
- Occupations: Writer, composer

Fritz Rotter (3 March 1900 – 11 April 1984) was an Austrian writer and composer. Along with his brother Alfred, he owned several Berlin theatres during the Weimar Republic but, due to his Jewish background, was forced to emigrate following the Nazi rise to power in 1933. After emigrating to the United States, he also wrote under the alias Mausie Rotha.

== Selected filmography ==
- The Wonderful Lies of Nina Petrovna (1929)
- When the White Lilacs Bloom Again (1929)
- Love in the Ring (1930)
- End of the Rainbow (1930)
- Lieutenant, Were You Once a Hussar? (1930)
- Spoiling the Game (1932)
- Modern Dowry (1932)
- Baby Face (1933)
- Madame Wants No Children (1933)
- Little Mother (1935)
- Nights on the Road (1952)
- Illusion in a Minor Key (1952)
- When the White Lilacs Bloom Again (1953)
- Eva (1958)

== Bibliography ==
- Marline Otte. Jewish Identities in German Popular Entertainment, 1890–1933. Cambridge University Press, 2006.
