= The Secret of Johann Orth =

1932 film

- Directed by: Willi Wolff
- Written by: Georg C. Klaren; Paul Merzbach; Willi Wolff
- Produced by: Ellen Richter; Willi Wolff
- Starring: Karl Ludwig Diehl; Ellen Richter; Paul Wegener
- Music by: Michael Lanner; Karl Millöcker
- Production company: Ellen Richter Film
- Distributed by: Europa-Filmverleih
- Release date: 29 November 1932
- Running time: 83 minutes
- Country: Germany
- Language: German

The Secret of Johann Orth (German: Das Geheimnis um Johann Orth) is a 1932 German historical drama film directed by Willi Wolff and starring Karl Ludwig Diehl, Ellen Richter and Paul Wegener. It was shot at the Johannisthal Studios in Berlin and on location in Austria. The film's sets were designed by the art director Hans Sohnle and Otto Erdmann.

== Cast ==
- Karl Ludwig Diehl as Johann Salvator (Johann Orth)
- Ellen Richter as Fürstin Olga Rostowska
- Paul Wegener as Fürst Rostowsky Botschafter a.Wien
- Gretl Theimer as Milly Stubel vom Theater a.d.Wien
- Paul Hörbiger as Lanik
- Paul Otto as Franz Joseph I.
- Paul Richter as Kronprinz Rudolf
- Fritz Alberti as Zar Alexander III.
- Harry Hardt as Graf Mansfeld
- Anton Pointner as Graf Neuborn
- Senta Söneland as Frau Ziesemak
- Olly Gebauer as Leila
- Hugo Flink as Der Ober Franz
- Gustl Gstettenbaur as Der Pikkolo
- Alfred Strasser as Kapellmeister

== See also ==
- The Secret of Satana Magarita (1921)
- A Vanished World (1922)

== Bibliography ==
- Grange, William. Cultural Chronicle of the Weimar Republic. Scarecrow Press, 2008. ISBN 978-0-8108-5967-8.
