= Bernhard Schwidewski =

German art director

- Born: 28 August 1885; Berlin, German Empire
- Died: 12 November 1966 (aged 81); West Berlin, West Germany
- Occupation: Art director
- Years active: 1919-1935 (film)

Bernhard Schwidewski (1885–1966) was a German art director.

== Selected filmography ==
- The Tragedy of a Great (1920)
- Struggle for the Soil (1925)
- The Dice Game of Life (1925)
- Lightning (1925)
- Gretchen Schubert (1926)
- My Friend the Chauffeur (1926)
- Tragedy at the Royal Circus (1928)
- The Beggar Student (1931)
- The Fate of Renate Langen (1931)
- The Woman They Talk About (1931)
- Frisians in Peril (1935)

== Bibliography ==
- Hardt, Ursula. From Caligari to California: Erich Pommer's life in the International Film Wars. Berghahn Books, 1996.
