= Das Geheimnis der Santa Margherita =

1921 film

- Directed by: Rolf Randolf
- Written by: Victor Mann
- Produced by: Rolf Randolf
- Cinematography: Ernst Krohn
- Production company: Rolf Randolf-Film
- Distributed by: Werner Film
- Release date: 17 September 1921
- Country: Germany
- Languages: Silent; German intertitles

Das Geheimnis der Santa Margherita is a 1921 German silent historical film directed by Rolf Randolf.

The film's art direction was by Gustav A. Knauer.

== Cast ==
- Rolf Randolf as Johann Orth
- Maria Zelenka as Risa
- Ria Jende as Katje
- Lys Andersen
- Olga Engl
- Carl Geppert as Reporter
- Karl Günther
- Rudolf Hilberg
- Ernst Pittschau
- Albert Steinrück

== See also ==
- A Vanished World (1922)
- The Secret of Johann Orth (1932)

== Bibliography ==
- Grange, William (2008). Cultural Chronicle of the Weimar Republic. Lanham, MD: Scarecrow Press. ISBN 978-0-8108-5967-8.
