= The Lorelei =

1927 film

- Directed by: Wolfgang Neff
- Written by: Willy Rath
- Produced by: Gustav Althoff
- Starring: Renate Brausewetter; Trude Hesterberg; Lotte Lorring
- Cinematography: Willy Großstück
- Music by: Felix Bartsch
- Production company: Althoff Film
- Distributed by: Filmhaus Bruckmann
- Release date: 27 April 1927
- Country: Germany
- Languages: Silent; German intertitles

The Lorelei (German: Die Lorelei) is a 1927 German silent drama film directed by Wolfgang Neff and starring Renate Brausewetter, Trude Hesterberg, and Lotte Lorring.

The film's sets were designed by Willi Herrmann.

== Cast ==
In alphabetical order

- Renate Brausewetter
- Wilhelm Diegelmann
- Hugo Döblin
- Trude Hesterberg
- Charles Willy Kayser
- Lotte Lorring
- Paul Otto
- Maria Paudler
- Walter Slezak
- Anna von Palen

== Bibliography ==
- Grange, William (2008). Cultural Chronicle of the Weimar Republic. Lanham, MD: Scarecrow Press. ISBN 978-0-8108-5967-8.
