= Felix Bartsch =

German composer

- Occupation: Composer
- Years active: 1924–1928 (film)

Felix Bartsch was a German composer. He wrote accompanying music for more than fifty films during the silent era.

== Selected filmography ==
- Claire (1924)
- Taras Bulba (1924)
- Upstairs and Downstairs (1925)
- The Circus Princess (1925)
- Orphan of Lowood (1926)
- I Liked Kissing Women (1926)
- The Young Man from the Ragtrade (1926)
- The Schimeck Family (1926)
- The Love of the Bajadere (1926)
- Women of Passion (1926)
- The Woman in Gold (1926)
- The Sea Cadet (1926)
- Annemarie and Her Cavalryman (1926)
- Kissing Is No Sin (1926)
- German Hearts on the German Rhine (1926)
- Vienna, How it Cries and Laughs (1926)
- The Captain from Koepenick (1926)
- The Laughing Husband (1926)
- Wrath of the Seas (1926)
- The Divorcée (1926)
- Rhenish Girls and Rhenish Wine (1927)
- A Girl of the People (1927)
- Circle of Lovers (1927)
- Circus Renz (1927)
- The Woman from the Folies Bergères (1927)
- The Curse of Vererbung (1927)
- Carnival Magic (1927)
- Flirtation (1927)
- The Lorelei (1927)
- Light-Hearted Isabel (1927)
- Bismarck 1862–1898 (1927)
- On the Banks of the River Weser (1927)
- The Villa in Tiergarten Park (1927)
- Weekend Magic (1927)
- Rinaldo Rinaldini (1927)
- The Criminal of the Century (1928)
- Fair Game (1928)
- Darling of the Dragoons (1928)

== Bibliography ==
- Sauer, Gert; Horn, Astrid, eds. (2001). Sternstunden des deutschen Films. Munich: DSZ, Druckschriften- und Zeitungs-Verlag. ISBN 978-3-925924-19-4.
