= The Pink Slippers =

1927 film by Franz Hofer

- Directed by: Franz Hofer
- Written by: Franz Hofer; Paula Hofer
- Starring: Hanni Reinwald; Ernst Rückert; Anna von Palen
- Cinematography: Julius Balting
- Production company: Veritas-Film
- Release date: 3 March 1927
- Country: Germany
- Languages: Silent; German intertitles

The Pink Slippers (German: Das rosa Pantöffelchen) is a 1927 German silent drama film directed by Franz Hofer and starring Hanni Reinwald, Ernst Rückert and Anna von Palen.

== Cast ==
- Hanni Reinwald as Komtesse Lu von Saldern
- Ernst Rückert as Fürst Karl-Heinz XVI.
- Anna von Palen as Lus Mutter
- Kurt Vespermann as Adjutant
- Käte Schmidt-Samst as Christel - Försterstochter
- Karl Harbacher as Hofmarschall
- Gaston Briese as Minister
- Hermann Picha as Minister
- Eduard von Winterstein as Oberförster
- Paul Graetz as Sally Löwenherz
- Fritz Kampers as Bräutigam
- Emmy Wyda as Tante Melusine
- Olga Engl as Fürstinmutter
- Fritz Beckmann as Onkel Armin
- Carl Geppert as Minister
- Erich Rank as Lus Vater
- Gerdi Gerdt as Wally Schnappzahn

== Bibliography ==
- Grange, William. Cultural Chronicle of the Weimar Republic. Scarecrow Press, 2008.
