= A Vanished World =

1922 film

- Directed by: Alexander Korda
- Written by: Lajos Bíró (novel)
- Produced by: Leo Mandl
- Starring: Alberto Capozzi; Victor Varconi; María Corda; Olga Lewinsky
- Cinematography: Hans Theyer
- Edited by: Karl Hartl
- Production company: Sascha-Film
- Release date: 23 February 1922
- Country: Austria
- Languages: Silent; German intertitles

A Vanished World (German: Eine versunkene Welt) is a 1922 Austrian silent adventure film directed by Alexander Korda and starring Alberto Capozzi, Victor Varconi, María Corda and Olga Lewinsky. It was based on the novel Serpoletto by Lajos Bíró. A Habsburg archduke enlists as an ordinary seamen. The film won the gold medal for Best Dramatic Film at the Milan International Cinema Concourse.

== Cast ==
- Alberto Capozzi - Herzog Peter
- Victor Varconi - Matrose Vannoni
- María Corda - Anny Lind (as Maria Palma)
- Olga Lewinsky - Herzogin Mutter
- Karl Baumgartner - Großherzog
- Harry De Loon - Adjutant Ridarsky
- Max Devrient - Kammerdiener Bartel
- Gyula Szőreghy
- Paul Lukacs
- Tibor Lubinszky
- Ernst Arndt

== See also ==
- The Secret of Satana Magarita (1921)
- The Secret of Johann Orth (1932)

== Bibliography ==
- Kulik, Karol. Alexander Korda: The Man Who Could Work Miracles. Virgin Books, 1990.
