= Marco's Greatest Gamble =

1926 film directed by Franz Seitz

- Directed by: Franz Seitz
- Written by: Joe Stöckel
- Starring: Joe Stöckel; Maria Mindzenty; Walter Slezak
- Cinematography: Franz Koch
- Production company: Münchner Lichtspielkunst
- Distributed by: Bavaria Film
- Release date: 18 March 1926
- Country: Germany
- Languages: Silent; German intertitles

Marco's Greatest Gamble (German: Marccos tollste Wette) is a 1926 German silent comedy film directed by Franz Seitz and starring Joe Stöckel, Maria Mindzenty and Walter Slezak.

It was made at the Emelka Studios in Munich. The sets were designed by Ludwig Reiber.

== Cast ==
- Joe Stöckel as Marcco
- Maria Mindzenty
- Walter Slezak

== Bibliography ==
- Quinlan, David. Quinlan's Illustrated Directory of Film Character Actors. Batsford, 1995.
