= The Divorcée (1926 film) =

1926 film

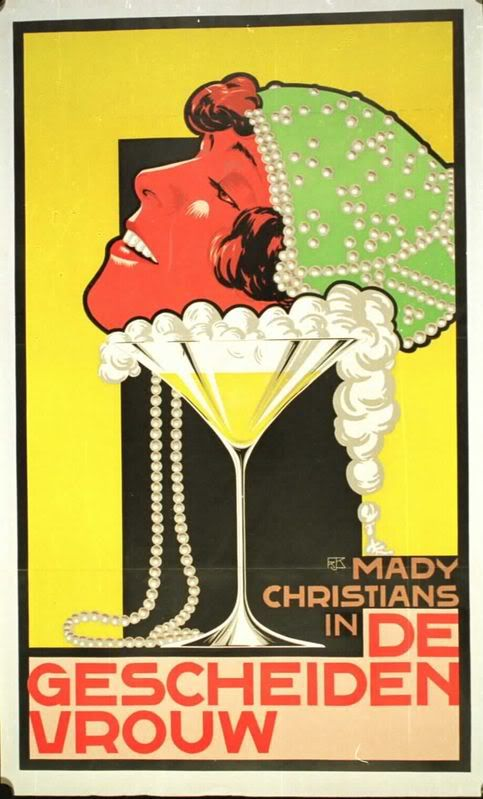
- Dutch release poster
- German: Die geschiedene Frau
- Directed by: Victor Janson; Rudolf Dworsky
- Written by: Jane Bess; Adolf Lantz
- Based on: Die geschiedene Frau (operetta) by Viktor Léon
- Produced by: Rudolf Dworsky
- Starring: Mady Christians; Marcella Albani; Bruno Kastner
- Cinematography: Carl Drews
- Music by: Felix Bartsch; Leo Fall
- Production company: Aafa-Film
- Distributed by: Aafa-Film
- Release date: 8 October 1926
- Country: Germany
- Languages: Silent; German intertitles

The Divorcée (German: Die geschiedene Frau) is a 1926 German silent film directed by Victor Janson and Rudolf Dworsky, starring Mady Christians, Marcella Albani, and Bruno Kastner. It is based on the operetta Die geschiedene Frau. It was shot at the Staaken Studios in Berlin. The film's sets were designed by the art director Jacek Rotmil.

== Cast ==
- Mady Christians as Gonda van der Loo
- Marcella Albani as Jana
- Bruno Kastner as Lucas van Deesteldonck
- Victor Janson as Dr. Scrop
- Paul Morgan as Erster Gerichtsdiener
- Wilhelm Bendow as Zweiter Gerichtsdiener
- Walter Rilla as Karel van Lysseweghe

== See also ==
- The Divorcée (1953)
