= Vienna, How it Cries and Laughs =

1926 film

- Directed by: Rudolf Walther-Fein; Rudolf Dworsky
- Written by: Ludwig Anzengruber (play); Alfred Halm
- Produced by: Rudolf Dworsky
- Starring: Fritz Greiner; John Mylong; Mady Christians
- Cinematography: Carl Drews
- Music by: Felix Bartsch
- Production company: Aafa-Film
- Distributed by: Aafa-Film
- Release date: 16 September 1926
- Country: Germany
- Languages: Silent; German intertitles

Vienna, How it Cries and Laughs (German: Wien, wie es weint und lacht) is a 1926 German silent film directed by Rudolf Walther-Fein and Rudolf Dworsky and starring Fritz Greiner, John Mylong, and Mady Christians.

The film's art direction was by Jacek Rotmil.

== Cast ==
- Fritz Greiner as Leopold Gruber - Haus / Fuhrwerksbesitzer
- John Mylong as Martin - sein Sohn
- Mady Christians as Sefi - seine Tochter
- Frida Richard as Die Großmutter
- Hans Brausewetter as Pepi Gschwandtner - ein Oberkellner
- Erich Kaiser-Titz as General Albrecht v. Wagher
- Mary Nolan as Adele - seine Tochter
- Hermann Picha as Hofrat Anton Hutter
- Werner Pittschau as Leutnant Otto Hutter - dessen Sohn
- Julius Falkenstein as Rittmeister Graf Kollodat
- Paul Biensfeldt as Schöllerer - Wagenwäscher
- Max Menden as Der Bursche des Generals
- Wilhelm Diegelmann as Ein dicker Gast

== Bibliography ==
- Bock, Hans-Michael & Bergfelder, Tim. The Concise Cinegraph: Encyclopaedia of German Cinema. Berghahn Books, 2009.
