= The Secret of St. Pauli =

1926 German silent film

- Directed by: Rolf Randolf
- Written by: Emanuel Alfieri; Hans Jacob
- Starring: Maria Matray; Hanni Weisse; Ernst Rückert
- Cinematography: Willy Hameister
- Music by: Hansheinrich Dransmann
- Production company: Internationale Film
- Distributed by: Meinert Film
- Release date: October 1926
- Country: Germany
- Languages: Silent; German intertitles

The Secret of St. Pauli (German: Das Geheimnis von St. Pauli) is a 1926 German silent film directed by Rolf Randolf and starring Maria Matray, Hanni Weisse and Ernst Rückert.

The film's sets were designed by the art director Robert A. Dietrich.

== Cast ==
- Maria Matray
- Hanni Weisse
- Ernst Rückert
- Carl de Vogt
- Hertha von Walther
- Julius Brandt
- Emmerich Hanus
