= Sword and Shield (film) =

1926 film

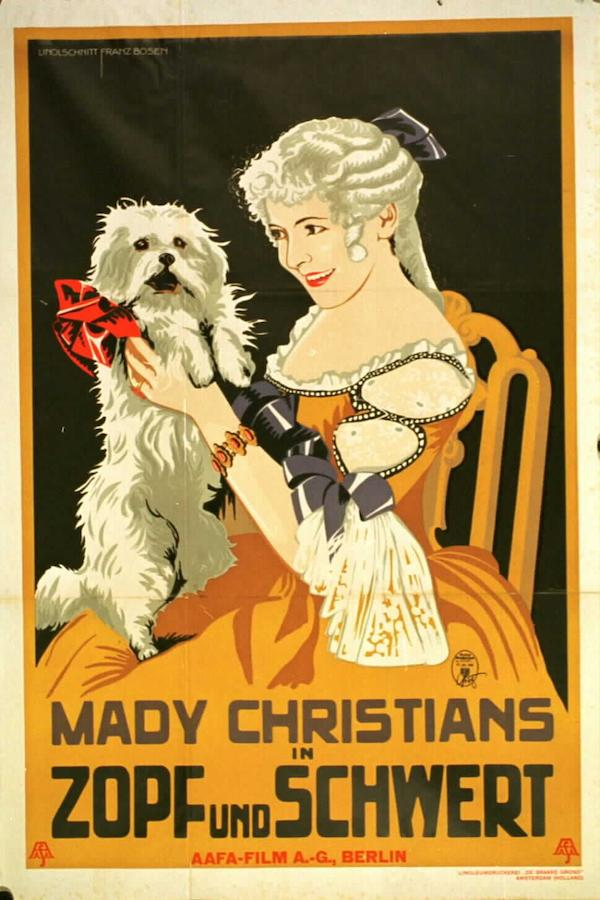
- Directed by: Victor Janson; Rudolf Dworsky
- Written by: Jane Bess; Karl Gutzkow (play); Adolf Lantz; Willy Rath
- Produced by: Gabriel Levy
- Starring: Mady Christians; William Dieterle; Albert Steinrück
- Cinematography: Carl Drews
- Music by: Marc Roland
- Production company: Aafa-Film
- Distributed by: Aafa-Film
- Release date: 26 August 1926
- Country: Germany
- Languages: Silent; German intertitles

Sword and Shield (German: Zopf und Schwert - Eine tolle Prinzessin) is a 1926 German silent historical romance film directed by Victor Janson and Rudolf Dworsky and starring Mady Christians, William Dieterle and Albert Steinrück. It is in the Prussian films tradition.

The film's sets were designed by Ernst Stern.

== Cast ==
- Mady Christians as Prinzessin Wilhelmine
- William Dieterle as Erbprinz von Bayreuth
- Albert Steinrück as Friedrich Wilhelm I, König von Preußen
- Hanni Weisse as Von Sonnsfeld, Hofdame der Prinzessin
- Julia Serda as Sophie Dorothea, Königin von Preußen
- Walter Janssen as Kronprinz Friedrich
- Harry Hardt as Graf Kayserlingk
- Robert Scholz as Hotham, englischer Gesandter
- Julius Falkenstein as Graf Seckendorf, kaiserlich-österreichischer Gesandter
- Rudolf Lettinger as General von Grumbkow
- Paul Biensfeldt as Eversmann, Kammerdiener des Königs
- Max Gülstorff as Laharpe
- Theodor Loos as Eckhoff, Unteroffizier
- Wilhelm Diegelmann as Silberwäscher des Königs
- Sophie Pagay as Seine Frau

== Bibliography ==
- Grange, William. Cultural Chronicle of the Weimar Republic. Scarecrow Press, 2008.
