= Simone Vaudry =

French actress (1906–1993)

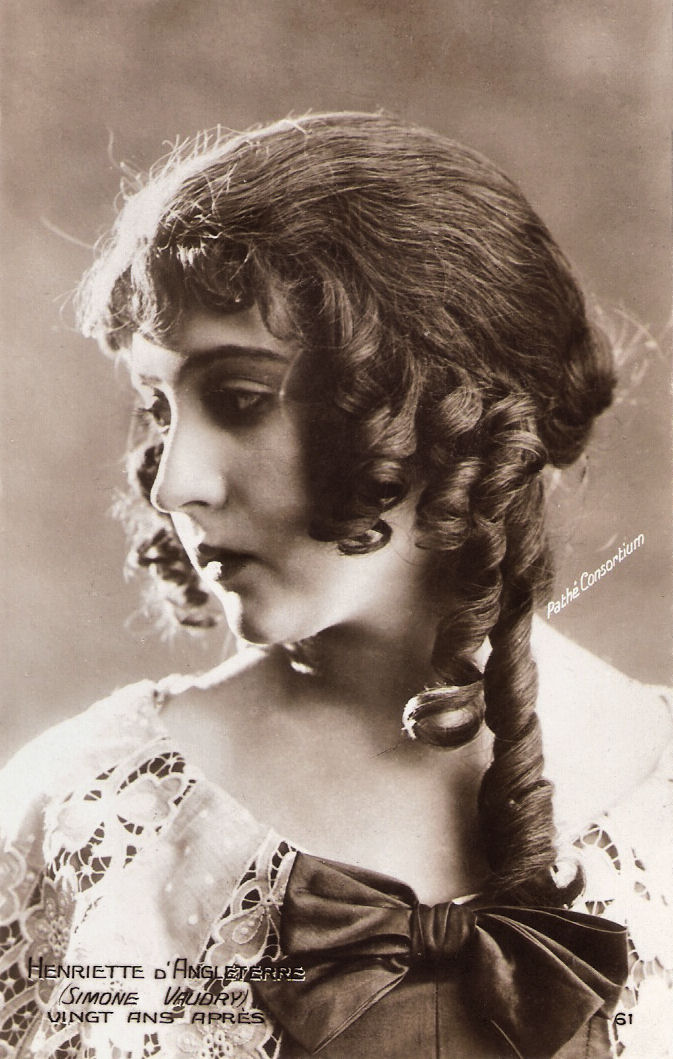
Simone Vaudry as Henriette d’Angleterre in Vingt ans après (1922)

Simone Vaudry (25 February 1906 – 3 January 1993) was a French film actress, most of whose films were made during the silent era.

== Selected filmography ==
- L'épingle rouge (1921)
- The Black Sheep (1922)
- Vingt ans après (1922)
- The Mysteries of Paris (1922)
- Mimi Pinson (1924)
- Mylord l'Arsouille (1925)
- Fanfan la Tulipe (1925)
- The Woman's Crusade (1926)
- The Master of Death (1926)
- The Porter from Maxim's (1927)
- The Sea (1927)
- Homesick (1927)
- Odette (1928)
- The Mystery of the Villa Rose (1930)
- When Do You Commit Suicide? (1931)
- The Eaglet (1931)
- Les amours de Pergolèse (1932)
- Three Lucky Fools (1933)

== Bibliography ==
- King, Norman. Abel Gance: A Politics of Spectacle. British Film Institute, 1984.
