= The Laughing Husband =

1926 film

- Directed by: Rudolf Walther-Fein; Rudolf Dworsky
- Written by: Jane Bess; Adolf Lantz; Paul Morgan; Julius Brammer (libretto); Alfred Grünwald (libretto)
- Starring: Livio Pavanelli; Elisabeth Pinajeff; Hans Albers
- Cinematography: Willy Hameister
- Music by: Felix Bartsch
- Production company: Aafa-Film
- Distributed by: Aafa-Film
- Release date: 26 November 1926
- Country: Germany
- Languages: Silent; German intertitles

The Laughing Husband (German:Der lachende Ehemann) is a 1926 German silent film directed by Rudolf Walther-Fein and Rudolf Dworsky and starring Livio Pavanelli, Elisabeth Pinajeff and Hans Albers. It is based on the operetta of the same name by Edmund Eysler.

The film's art direction was by Hans Minzloff and Jacek Rotmil.

== Cast ==
- Livio Pavanelli as Ottokar Bruckner
- Elisabeth Pinajeff as Hella, Bruckners Ehefrau
- Hans Albers as Graf Balthasar Selztal
- Paul Heidemann as Max Basewitz
- Vivian Gibson as Etelka, die gechiedene Frau von Basewitz
- Max Hansen as Hans, frischgebackener Ehemann
- Charlotte Ander as Dolly, frischgebackene Ehefrau
- Carl Auen as Dr. Rosenroth, Lawyer
- Hermann Picha as Bürovorsteher

== Bibliography ==
- Bock, Hans-Michael & Bergfelder, Tim. The Concise CineGraph. Encyclopedia of German Cinema. Berghahn Books, 2009.
