= Kissing Is No Sin (1926 film) =

1926 German film

- Xenia Desni and Livio Pavanelli
- Directed by: Rudolf Walther-Fein; Rudolf Dworsky
- Written by: Hans Otto; Walter Reisch
- Starring: Xenia Desni; Ellen Plessow; Livio Pavanelli
- Cinematography: Willy Hameister
- Music by: Felix Bartsch
- Production company: Aafa-Film
- Distributed by: Aafa-Film
- Release date: October 1926
- Country: Germany
- Languages: Silent; German intertitles

Kissing Is No Sin (German: Küssen ist keine Sünd) is a 1926 German silent comedy film directed by Rudolf Walther-Fein and Rudolf Dworsky and starring Xenia Desni, Ellen Plessow, and Livio Pavanelli.

== Cast ==
- Xenia Desni as Liesl, Comtesse Heiterstein
- Ellen Plessow as Miß Moissi, ihre Gouvernante
- Gustav Müller as Cölestin Graf Heiterstein, Liesls Vater
- Benno Smytt as Leutnant Zacharias Zach
- Livio Pavanelli as Rittmeister Theodor Freiherr von Schlipps
- Paul Graetz as Paul Polizzer
- Lina Frank as Berta Bibiana Karoline Doppelhopp
- Heinz Fischer as Rudi Doppelhopp, ihr Sohn
- Hermann Benke as General Freiherr von Hassensassa
- Hans Albers

== Bibliography ==
- Bock, Hans-Michael; Bergfelder, Tim, eds. (2009). The Concise Cinegraph: Encyclopaedia of German Cinema. New York: Berghahn Books. ISBN 978-1-57181-655-9.
