= The Sweet Girl =

1926 film

- Directed by: Manfred Noa
- Written by: Leo Stein (libretto); Alexander Landesberg (libretto); Joseph Than; Ludwig von Wohl
- Starring: Mary Nolan; Paul Heidemann; Nils Asther
- Cinematography: Otto Kanturek
- Music by: Hans May; Heinrich Reinhardt
- Production company: Noa-Film
- Distributed by: Süd-Film
- Release date: 8 October 1926
- Country: Germany
- Languages: Silent; German intertitles

The Sweet Girl (German: Das Süße Mädel) is a 1926 German silent film directed by Manfred Noa and starring Mary Nolan, Paul Heidemann and Nils Asther. It is based on an operetta. The German title is a Viennese slang term.

The film's sets were designed by the art director Gustav A. Knauer and Hermann Warm.

== Cast ==
- Mary Nolan
- Paul Heidemann
- Nils Asther as The Prince's Son
- Mary Parker
- Eugen Burg
- Hanni Reinwald
- Loo Hardy
- Ernst Pröckl
- Karl Platen
- Henry Bender
- Sophie Pagay
- Bobbie Bender
- Alex Angelo
- Ernst Morgan
- Geza L. Weiss
- Max Hiller
- Manfred Noa as dancer

== Bibliography ==
- Claus Tieber & Anna Katharina Windisch. The Sounds of Silent Films: New Perspectives on History, Theory and Practice. Palgrave Macmillan, 2014. ISBN 978-1137410719
