= Women of Passion =

1926 film

- Directed by: Rolf Randolf
- Written by: Max Jungk; Julius Urgiß
- Produced by: Rolf Randolf; C.G. von Negelein
- Starring: Fern Andra; Ágnes Esterházy; Henry Bender
- Cinematography: Arpad Viragh
- Music by: Felix Bartsch
- Production company: Ranneg-Film
- Distributed by: Filmhaus Bruckmann
- Release date: 16 April 1926
- Country: Germany
- Languages: Silent; German intertitles

Women of Passion (German: Frauen der Leidenschaft) is a 1926 German silent film directed by Rolf Randolf and starring Fern Andra, Ágnes Esterházy, and Henry Bender.

The film's sets were designed by Robert A. Dietrich.

== Cast ==
- Fern Andra as Cléo de Mérode
- Ágnes Esterházy as Prinzessin Chimay
- Henry Bender
- Walter Janssen
- Leopold von Ledebur as Der König
- Frida Richard
- Theodor Loos as Geiger Rigo
- Paul Otto
- Hermann Picha
- Albert Paulig
- Fritz Spira
- Eduard von Winterstein

== Bibliography ==
- Krautz, Alfred (1984). International Directory of Cinematographers, Set- and Costume Designers in Film. Vol. 4. Munich: Saur. ISBN 978-3-598-21434-9.
