= The World Wants To Be Deceived =

1926 film

- Directed by: Peter Paul Felner
- Written by: Peter Paul Felner
- Produced by: Heinrich Nebenzahl
- Starring: Harry Liedtke; Georg Alexander; Mady Christians
- Cinematography: Curt Courant; Sophus Wangøe
- Production company: Nero Film
- Distributed by: Bayerische Film
- Release date: 28 October 1926
- Country: Germany
- Languages: Silent; German intertitles

The World Wants To Be Deceived (German: Die Welt will belogen sein) is a 1926 German silent film directed by Peter Paul Felner and starring Harry Liedtke, Georg Alexander and Mady Christians.

The film's art direction was by Ernst Stern.

== Cast ==
- Harry Liedtke as Robert Cors, Direktor einer Waffenfabrik
- Georg Alexander as Charles Barcknell
- Mady Christians as Mery, seine Frau
- Walter Rilla as Dr. Stone, Arzt
- Paul Biensfeldt as Hutten
- Mary Nolan as Ly, dessen Tochter
- Henri De Vries as Albert Cors
- Eugen Rex as Jones, Journalist
- Paul Morgan as Ein Professor
- Carl Geppert as Dr. Sixtus
- Else Reval

== Bibliography ==
- Hans-Michael Bock and Tim Bergfelder. The Concise Cinegraph: An Encyclopedia of German Cinema. Berghahn Books.
