= Mary Nolan =

American actress (1902–1948)

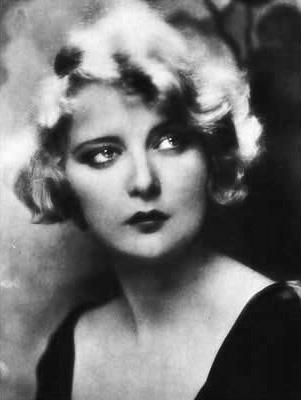
- Stars of the Photoplay, 1930
- Born: Mariam Imogene Robertson; December 18, 1902; Louisville, Kentucky, U.S.
- Died: October 31, 1948 (aged 45); Los Angeles, California, U.S.
- Resting place: Hollywood Forever Cemetery
- Other names: Imogene Robertson; Imogene "Bubbles" Wilson
- Occupations: Actress; model; singer; dancer
- Years active: 1919–1937
- Spouse: Wallace T. McCreary (m. 1931; div. 1932)

Mary Nolan (born Mariam Imogene Robertson; December 18, 1902 – October 31, 1948) was an American stage and film actress, singer and dancer. She began her career as a Ziegfeld girl in the 1920s performing under the stage name Imogene "Bubbles" Wilson. She was fired from the Ziegfeld Follies in 1924 for her involvement in a tumultuous, highly publicized affair with comedian Frank Tinney. She left the United States shortly thereafter and began making films in Germany. She appeared in 17 German films from 1925 to 1927, using the stage name Imogene Robertson.

Upon returning to the United States in 1927, she attempted to break from her previous scandal-ridden past and adopted the stage name Mary Nolan. She was signed to Universal Pictures in 1928 where she found some success in films. By the 1930s, her acting career began to decline due to her drug abuse and reputation for being temperamental. After being bought out of contract with Universal, she was unable to secure film work with any major studios. Nolan spent the remainder of her acting career appearing in roles in low-budget films for independent studios. She made her final film appearance in 1933.

After her film career ended, Nolan appeared in vaudeville and performed in nightclubs and roadhouses around the United States. Her later years were plagued by drug problems and frequent hospitalizations. She returned to Hollywood in 1939 where she spent her remaining years living in obscurity. Nolan died of a barbiturate overdose in 1948 at the age of 45.

== Early life ==
Mary Robertson was born in Louisville, Kentucky, on December 18, 1902. She was one of five children of Alfcanis and Viola (née Pittman) Robertson. Her mother died of cancer at the age of 41. Unable to care for five young children, Alfcanis Robertson placed Mary in a foster home. In June 1912, she left the orphanage and traveled to New York City to be near her older sister Mabel. She was discovered by magazine illustrator Arthur William Brown and began working as an artists' model.

== Career ==
=== Stage career ===
While working as a model, Nolan was discovered by Florenz Ziegfeld who hired her as a dancer in his Ziegfeld Follies. As a showgirl in New York, she performed under the name Imogene "Bubbles" Wilson and soon became one of the more popular Ziegfeld Girls. Nolan's impact was so profound that columnist Mark Hellinger stated in 1922: "Only two people in America would bring every reporter in New York to the docks to see them off. One is the President. The other is Imogene "Bubbles" Wilson."

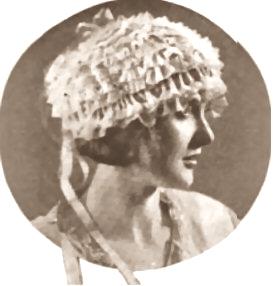
in The Delineator (1922)

While working in the Follies, Nolan began a tumultuous and highly publicized affair with blackface comedian and actor Frank Tinney. He was married to former singer and dancer Edna Davenport with whom he had a young son, and he drank heavily and reportedly physically abused Nolan. On May 24, 1924, Tinney and Nolan got into a physical altercation in her apartment after he awoke to find her with a male reporter. After the altercation, Nolan attempted suicide. On May 28, she appeared before New York City Magistrate Thomas McAndrews to report the assault and to press charges against Tinney. Nolan maintained that Tinney beat her and "chastised" her maid Carrie Sneed. Nolan had bruises on her head and body, and Sneed, who came along with her as a witness, was also injured. Tinney was arrested at his home on Long Island the following day. In June 1924, the case went before a grand jury. Based on the evidence, the jury refused to indict Tinney on assault charges. Afterward, Tinney claimed the whole ordeal was a publicity stunt concocted by Nolan.

After the grand jury hearing, Tinney decided to leave New York to perform in vaudeville in England. In early August 1924, he booked a trip on the Columbus ocean liner. Two days before Tinney was set to leave, he and Nolan reconciled and were photographed together outside of a Broadway theatre. Tinney smashed the camera of the photographer who took their photo, and he was sued for assault. In order to avoid reporters, Tinney decided to board the Columbus the day before his scheduled departure. While waiting to board the ship on August 5, Tinney was served with papers informing him that his wife Edna Davenport had filed for legal separation. At 8 a.m. the following morning, Nolan showed up to bid Tinney farewell. The two stayed in Tinney's cabin to avoid reporters. Nolan had to be physically escorted off the ship after ignoring the departure whistle. Nolan wept as she watched the Columbus depart and told reporters on hand that she was still in love with Tinney. She stated that Tinney was "the only thing in my life. I know it. You know it. So why should I beat around the bush?" Nolan's tearful goodbye to Tinney was covered by the media which prompted Florenz Ziegfeld, who disliked negative publicity, to fire Nolan later that day. Ziegfeld said that he fired Nolan because she had promised to end her relationship with Tinney. He added "She broke her promise and I discharged her on account of the notoriety and also to prevent a possible disruption of the morale of my cast."

On September 20, 1924, Nolan set sail for France where she was scheduled to appear in vaudeville. She made her way to London in October, where she reunited with Frank Tinney. By December 1924, Tinney had resumed drinking and began to physically abuse her again. In early 1925, Nolan finally ended their relationship. She then traveled to Germany, where she worked in films for the next two years.

=== German films ===
While in Germany, Nolan performed under the name Imogene Robertson. Her first German film was Verborgene Gluten, released in 1925. Later that year, she appeared in Die Feuertänzerin for Universum Film AG. She received good reviews for her work in the film, which prompted UFA to offer her a contract for $1,500 per week. Nolan worked steadily in Germany from 1925 to 1927, and she continued to receive favorable reviews for her acting. While in Germany, she received offers from Hollywood producers to appear in American films but turned them down. She finally relented after Joseph M. Schenck offered her a contract with United Artists. She returned to the United States in January 1927.

=== Hollywood years and decline ===
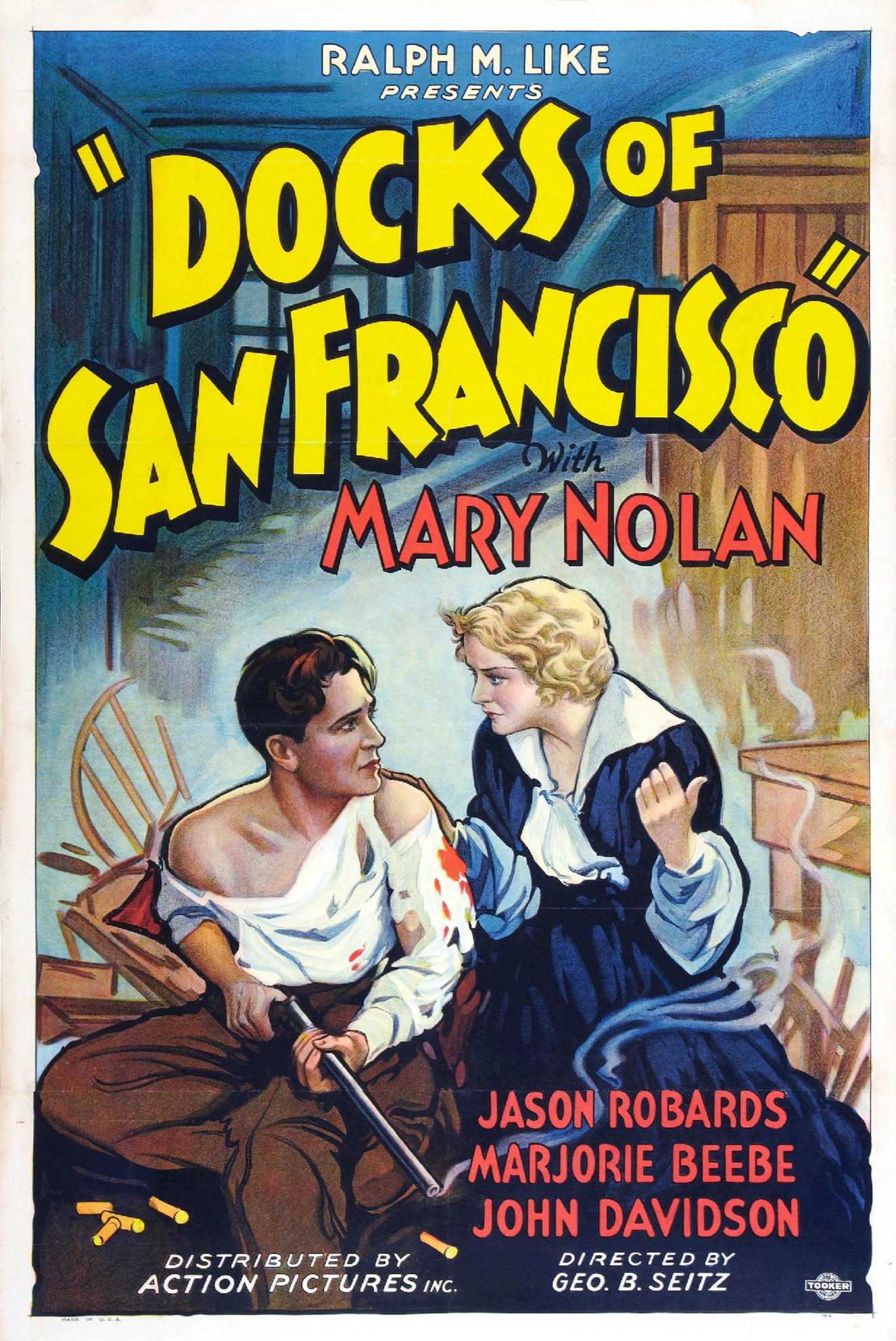
Poster for Docks of San Francisco (1932)

Nolan's return to the United States was covered by the press, who were still interested in the scandalous "Bubbles" Wilson. Several women's groups protested her making films in the States while Will H. Hays also expressed doubts about her embarking on a career in Hollywood. To solve the problem of audiences connecting her with her scandalous past, United Artists suggested she change her name to Mary Nolan. She made two films while under contract with United Artists; she appeared in an uncredited bit part in Topsy and Eva (1927), and a supporting role in Sorrell and Son (1927).

In August 1927, she left United Artists and signed with Universal Pictures. Her first film for the company was Good Morning, Judge, starring Reginald Denny for which she received good reviews. In 1928, she was loaned out to Metro-Goldwyn-Mayer for West of Zanzibar. The film stars Lon Chaney and Lionel Barrymore, and Nolan was cast as Chaney's defiled daughter Maizie. The film was a hit, and Nolan received favorable reviews for her work in the film. The following year, she was loaned to MGM again for the romantic drama Desert Nights, and cast with John Gilbert. The film was another financial success for MGM and served to boost Nolan's career further.

Shortly after signing with Universal in 1927, Nolan began a relationship with another married man, studio executive Eddie Mannix, who used his clout to bolster Nolan's work with MGM. Shortly after Desert Nights was released in 1929, Mannix abruptly ended the relationship. This angered Nolan, who threatened to tell Mannix's wife Bernice of their affair. Mannix became enraged and beat her unconscious. Nolan was hospitalized for six months and required 15 surgeries to repair the damage Mannix inflicted on her abdomen. While hospitalized, Nolan was prescribed morphine for the pain. She eventually became addicted, which contributed to the decline of her career.

Nolan's career and reputation took another hit when, in 1930, she was fired from the film What Men Want. Nolan got into an argument with Ernst Laemmle, the film's director, after she learned she was the only cast member who hadn't received a close-up shot. Laemmle (the nephew of Universal boss Carl Laemmle) banned Nolan from the set, and she was fired. After threatening to file a lawsuit against Universal, the studio bought out her contract in January 1931. Due to her reputation for alleged drug use and temperamental behavior, Nolan could not find work with any major studio. For the remainder of her career, she appeared in supporting roles in low-budget films for Poverty Row studios. She made her final appearance in the 1933 mystery film File 113 for Allied Pictures.

== Personal life ==
Nolan was married once and had no children. She married stockbroker Wallace T. McCreary on March 29, 1931. One week before they married, McCreary lost $3 million on bad investments. The couple used McCreary's remaining money to open a dress shop in Beverly Hills. The shop went out of business within months, and Nolan filed for bankruptcy in August 1931. Nolan divorced McCreary in July 1932.

=== Legal issues ===
Over the course of her career, Nolan had several run-ins with police. In February 1931, she was charged with petty theft after L.H. Hillyer, a man from whom Nolan had rented a house, accused her of stealing a $200 rug from the home. The rug later turned up at the home of a doctor who claimed Nolan had given it to him in exchange for payment for medical care. In December 1931, Nolan and her then husband William T. McCreary were arrested after 13 employees of their dress shop filed charges against them for failing to pay them wages. In March 1932, Nolan and McCreary were convicted of violating 17 labor laws and sentenced to 30 days in jail.

== Later years ==
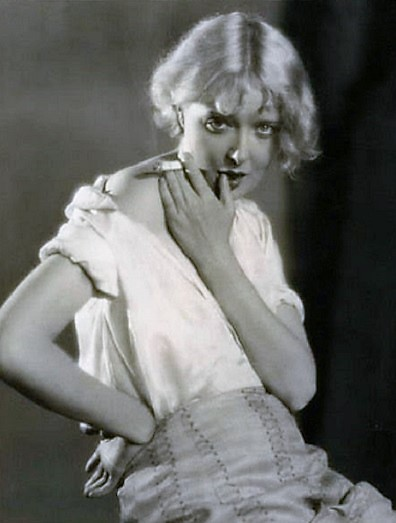
Nolan in 1930

In July 1935, Nolan made news again when she filed a lawsuit against her former lover, MGM studio executive and producer Eddie Mannix. In her suit, Nolan claimed that the two had lived together at the Ambassador Hotel from 1927 to 1931 (Mannix was married at the time) and that Mannix frequently beat her and used his considerable influence to ruin her career. Nolan also claimed that one such physical attack by Mannix required hospitalization where she underwent 20 surgeries. She asked for $500,000 in damages. Eddie Mannix and Howard Strickling, the head of publicity at MGM, publicly denied Nolan's claims, stating that the suit was a publicity stunt to bolster Nolan's flagging career. Nolan's friends supported her claims, however, stating that while the two were together, Nolan underwent three abortions, paid for by Mannix, and that she appeared on set with black eyes and bruises due to Mannix's physical abuse. According to Mannix's biographer E.J. Fleming, Mannix was incensed by the negative publicity the suit brought him and set out to discredit Nolan and ruin her reputation. Strickling and MGM's publicity department leaked negative stories about Nolan's sexual activities and abortions to the press. Fleming said that Nolan later dropped the suit and left Los Angeles after Mannix sent a private detective to Nolan's home who told her that if she didn't drop the suit, she would be arrested for possessing morphine (the drug she was prescribed during her hospital stays to which she eventually became addicted).

After leaving Los Angeles, Nolan earned a living by appearing on the vaudeville circuit. She also sang in nightclubs and roadhouses throughout the United States. In March 1937, she was jailed in New York City for failing to pay a four-year-old dress bill to The Wilma Gowns, Inc. for $405.87. At the time of her arrest, she was staying at a "cheap rooming house not far from Times Square." While in jail, she was transferred to the psychiatric ward at Bellevue Hospital. Upon her release, Nolan told reporters that she was sent to Bellevue because the shock of her arrest caused her "severe nervous strain" which required hospitalization.

After her release from Bellevue, she returned to performing in nightclubs. In July 1937, the Actors Fund of America sent her to the Brunswick Home in Amityville, New York for psychiatric treatment. She was transferred from the Brunswick Home in October 1937 after overdosing on sedatives. She remained hospitalized for a year. Upon her release in 1939, she returned to Hollywood and changed her name to Mary Wilson. She moved to a bungalow court, which she later managed to earn money. In 1941, she sold her life story to The American Weekly, serialized under the title "Confessions of a Follies Girl", and appeared in several issues. In Spring 1948, she was hospitalized for malnutrition and treated for a gall bladder disorder. Shortly before her death, she began working on her memoirs, titled Yesterday's Girl, with the help of writer John Preston.

== Death ==
On October 31, 1948, Nolan was found dead in a three-room bungalow court apartment, at the age of 45. An autopsy later determined that Nolan had died of an overdose of Seconal. Her death is listed as "accidental or suicide". Her funeral was held on November 4 at the Utter-McKinley & Strother Hollywood chapel in Hollywood. Nolan was buried at Hollywood Forever Cemetery.

Among Nolan's few possessions was an antique piano once owned by Rudolph Valentino. It was sold in an estate sale.

== Filmography ==
Year	Title	Role	Notes
1925	Hidden Fires	Ias, Jacks Wife	credited as Imogene Robertson
1925	If Only It Weren't Love		credited as Imogene Robertson
1925	Mrs Worrington's Perfume		credited as Imogene Robertson
1925	The Fire Dancer	Die Feuertänzerin	credited as Imogene Robertson
1925	The Untouched Woman	Marcelle Vautier	credited as Imogene Robertson
1926	Tea Time in the Ackerstrasse		credited as Imogene Robertson
1926	Our Daily Bread		credited as Imogene Robertson
1926	Eleven Who Were Loyal	Marie von Wedel	alternative title: The Eleven Schill Officers credited as Imogene Robertson
1926	Vienna, How it Cries and Laughs	Adele	credited as Imogene Robertson
1926	The Sweet Girl		credited as Imogene Robertson
1926	The World Wants To Be Deceived	Ly	credited as Imogene Robertson
1926	Uneasy Money	Anna	alternative title: Adventures of a Ten Mark Note credited as Imogene Robertson lost film
1926	The Queen of the Baths	Micheline Bonnard	credited as Imogene Robertson
1926	The Armoured Vault	Ellen, Frau Elgin	credited as Imogene Robertson
1927	Memoirs of a Nun		Credited as Imogene Robertson
1927	Hello Caesar!		credited as Imogene Robertson
1927	Topsy and Eva	bit role	uncredited
1927	Sorrell and Son	Molly Roland	
1928	Good Morning, Judge	Julia Harrington	credited as Imogene Robertson lost film
1928	The Foreign Legion	Sylvia Omney	credited as Imogene Robertson
1928	West of Zanzibar	Maizie	
1929	Silks and Saddles	Sybil Morrissey	
1929	Desert Nights	Lady Diana Stonehill	alternative title: Thirst
1929	Charming Sinners	Anne-Marie Whitley	
1929	Shanghai Lady	Cassie Cook	
1930	Undertow	Sally Blake	
1930	Young Desire	Helen Herbert	
1930	Outside the Law	Connie Madden	
1931	Enemies of the Law	Florence Vinton	
1931	X Marks the Spot	Vivian Parker	
1931	The Big Shot	Fay Turner	
1932	Docks of San Francisco	Belle	
1932	Midnight Patrol	Miss Willing	
1932	Broadway Gossip No. 3	movie star	short film
1933	File 113	Mlle. Adoree	

== Footnotes ==
=== References ===
- Ankerich, Michael G. (2010). Dangerous Curves Atop Hollywood Heels: The Lives, Careers, and Misfortunes of 14 Hard-Luck Girls of the Silent Screen. BearManor. ISBN 978-1-593-93605-1.
- Ellenberger, Allan R. (2001). Celebrities in Los Angeles Cemeteries: A Directory. McFarland. ISBN 0-786-40983-5.
- Fleming, E.J. (2004). The Fixers: Eddie Mannix, Howard Strickling and the MGM Publicity Machine. McFarland. ISBN 0-786-45495-4.
- Golden, Eve (2000). Golden Images: 41 Essays on Silent Film Stars. McFarland. ISBN 0-786-48354-7.
- Soister, John T. (2010). American Silent Horror, Science Fiction and Fantasy Feature Films, 1913‒1929. McFarland. ISBN 978-0-786-48790-5.
