= The Fallen (1926 film) =

1926 film

- Directed by: Rudolf Walther-Fein; Rudolf Dworsky
- Written by: Luise Westkirch (novel); Ruth Goetz; Leo Heller
- Produced by: Gabriel Levy
- Starring: Asta Nielsen; William Dieterle; Otto Gebühr; Olga Chekhova
- Cinematography: Theodor Sparkuhl
- Production company: Aafa-Film
- Distributed by: Aafa-Film
- Release date: 18 January 1926
- Running time: 109 minutes
- Country: Germany
- Languages: Silent; German intertitles

The Fallen (German: Die Gesunkenen) is a 1926 German silent drama film directed by Rudolf Walther-Fein and Rudolf Dworsky and starring Asta Nielsen, William Dieterle, and Otto Gebühr. It was shot at the EFA Studios in Berlin. The film's sets were designed by the art director Jacek Rotmil. The 109-minute film addressed the issue of alcoholism amongst the German working class.

== Cast ==
- Asta Nielsen as Anna Grosser
- William Dieterle as Grosser, Strassenbahnschaffner
- Otto Gebühr as Römer, Dichter
- Olga Chekhova as Malwa, Freundin von Hammer
- Hans Albers as Hammer, Fabrikbesitzer
- Eduard von Winterstein as Untersuchungsrichter
- Paul Biensfeldt as Kohlenludchen
- Wilhelm Diegelmann as Wirt
- Hermann Vallentin as Ein Raffke
- Hermann Picha as Betrunkener
- Robert Garrison as Ein zweiter Raffke
- Fritz Greiner as Konrad, Fabrikarbeiter
- Georg John as Schampuspusorje
- Erich Kaiser-Titz as Braun, Versicherungsdirektor
- Adolf Lettinger as Potter, Prokurist bei Hammer
- Sybill Morel as Die lange Lotte
- Paul Rehkopf as Knüselfritze
- Lydia Petrowa
- Rudolf Lettinger

== Bibliography ==
- Murray, Bruce Arthur (1990). Film and the German Left in the Weimar Republic: From Caligari to Kuhle Wampe. Austin: University of Texas Press. ISBN 978-0-292-72465-5.
