= Peter Paul Felner =

Austrian-Hungarian screenwriter and film director

Peter Paul Felner (1884–1927) was an Austrian-Hungarian screenwriter and film director.

== Selected filmography ==
=== Director ===
- Prinz und Tänzerin (1920)
- Marquis Fun (1920)
- The Earl of Essex (1922)
- The Merchant of Venice (1923)
- Prater (1924)
- The Golden Calf (1925)
- The World Wants To Be Deceived (1926)
- Das Meer (1927)

== Bibliography ==
- Janik, Vicki. The Merchant of Venice: A Guide to the Play. Greenwood Publishing Group, 2003.
