= Hanni Reinwald =

German actress

- Born: 24 August 1903; Stuttgart, Kingdom of Württemberg, German Empire
- Died: 1978 (aged 74–75); Munich, Bavaria, West Germany
- Occupation: Actress
- Years active: 1913–1929
- Relatives: Grete Reinwald (sister); Otto Reinwald (brother)

Hanni Reinwald (24 August 1903 – 1978) was a German stage and film actress. Originally a child actor, she later graduated to adult roles, and retired from the film industry at the end of the silent era. She was the sister of Grete Reinwald and Otto Reinwald.

== Selected filmography ==
- Bismarck (1914)
- Revenge Is Mine (1919)
- Mary Tudor (1920)
- Mascotte (1920)
- Das Milliardensouper (1923)
- The Way to the Light (1923)
- Fever for Heights (1924)
- Women You Rarely Greet (1925)
- The Captain from Koepenick (1926)
- The Sweet Girl (1926)
- The King's Command (1926)
- Give My Regards to the Blonde Child on the Rhine (1926)
- The Clever Fox (1926)
- Lace (1926)
- Marriage Announcement (1926)
- One Against All (1927)
- The Pink Slippers (1927)
- The Saint and Her Fool (1928)
- Misled Youth (1929)
- Roses Bloom on the Moorland (1929)
- The Woman in the Advocate's Gown (1929)

== Bibliography ==
- Grange, William. Cultural Chronicle of the Weimar Republic. Scarecrow Press, 2008.
