= The Schimeck Family =

1926 film

The Schimek Family
- Directed by: Alfred Halm; Rudolf Dworsky
- Written by: Alfred Halm
- Based on: The Schimek Family by Gustaf Kadelburg
- Produced by: Rudolf Dworsky; Gabriel Levy
- Starring: Livio Pavanelli; Olga Chekhova; Lydia Potechina
- Cinematography: Carl Drews
- Music by: Felix Bartsch
- Production company: Aafa-Film
- Distributed by: Aafa-Film
- Release date: 25 March 1926
- Country: Germany
- Languages: Silent; German intertitles

The Schimek Family (German: Familie Schimek – Wiener Herzen) is a 1926 German silent comedy film directed by Alfred Halm and Rudolf Dworsky and starring Livio Pavanelli, Olga Chekhova, and Lydia Potechina. It was shot at the EFA Studios in Berlin. The film's sets were designed by the art director Jacek Rotmil. It is based on the 1915 play of the same title by Gustaf Kadelburg, later adapted into a 1935 German film and a 1957 Austrian film.

== Cast ==
- Livio Pavanelli as Franz Kaltenbach - Industrieller
- Olga Chekhova as Olga, seine Frau
- Lydia Potechina as Kaltenbachs Schwiegermutter
- Ernst Rückert as Dragoner-Leutnant
- Max Hansen as K. K. Kadett
- Hans Wallner as K. K. Feldwebel
- Paul Morgan as Vormundschaftsrichter
- Hermann Picha as Nepomuk Zavadil
- Margarete Kupfer as Frau Schimel - Tischlerswitwe
- Xenia Desni as Lisl
- Illo Gutschwager as Willi - ihr Kind
- Karl Dehnert as Franzl, ihr Kind
- William Dieterle as Josef Baumann - Tischlergeselle
- Fritz Greiner as Chauffeur

== Bibliography ==
- Hans-Michael Bock and Tim Bergfelder. The Concise Cinegraph: An Encyclopedia of German Cinema. Berghahn Books.
