= The Master of Death (film) =

1926 film

- Directed by: Hans Steinhoff
- Written by: Karl Rosner; Hans Székely
- Produced by: Paul Ebner; Maxim Galitzenstein
- Starring: Alfred Solm; Hertha von Walther; Simone Vaudry
- Cinematography: Willy Gaebel; Hans Theyer
- Music by: Pasquale Perris
- Production company: Maxim-Film
- Distributed by: UFA
- Release date: 26 November 1926
- Running time: 95 minutes
- Country: Germany
- Languages: Silent; German intertitles

The Master of Death (German: Der Herr des Todes) is a 1926 German silent drama film directed by Hans Steinhoff and starring Alfred Solm, Hertha von Walther and Simone Vaudry. The film's sets were designed by the art director Robert Neppach.

== Cast ==
- Alfred Solm as Peter von Hersdorff
- Hertha von Walther as Maja
- Simone Vaudry as Heid von Duren
- Eduard von Winterstein as Colonel von Hersdorff
- Heinrich Peer as Privy councillor von Duren
- Erna Hauk as Daisy, Brown
- Jenny Marba as Mrs von Hersdorff
- Hedwig Pauly-Winterstein as Privy Councillor von Duren's wife
- Ferdinand von Alten as Baron von Bassenheim
- S.Z. Sakall as Bordoni
- Fritz Sohn
