= Rudolf Dworsky =

German film producer and director

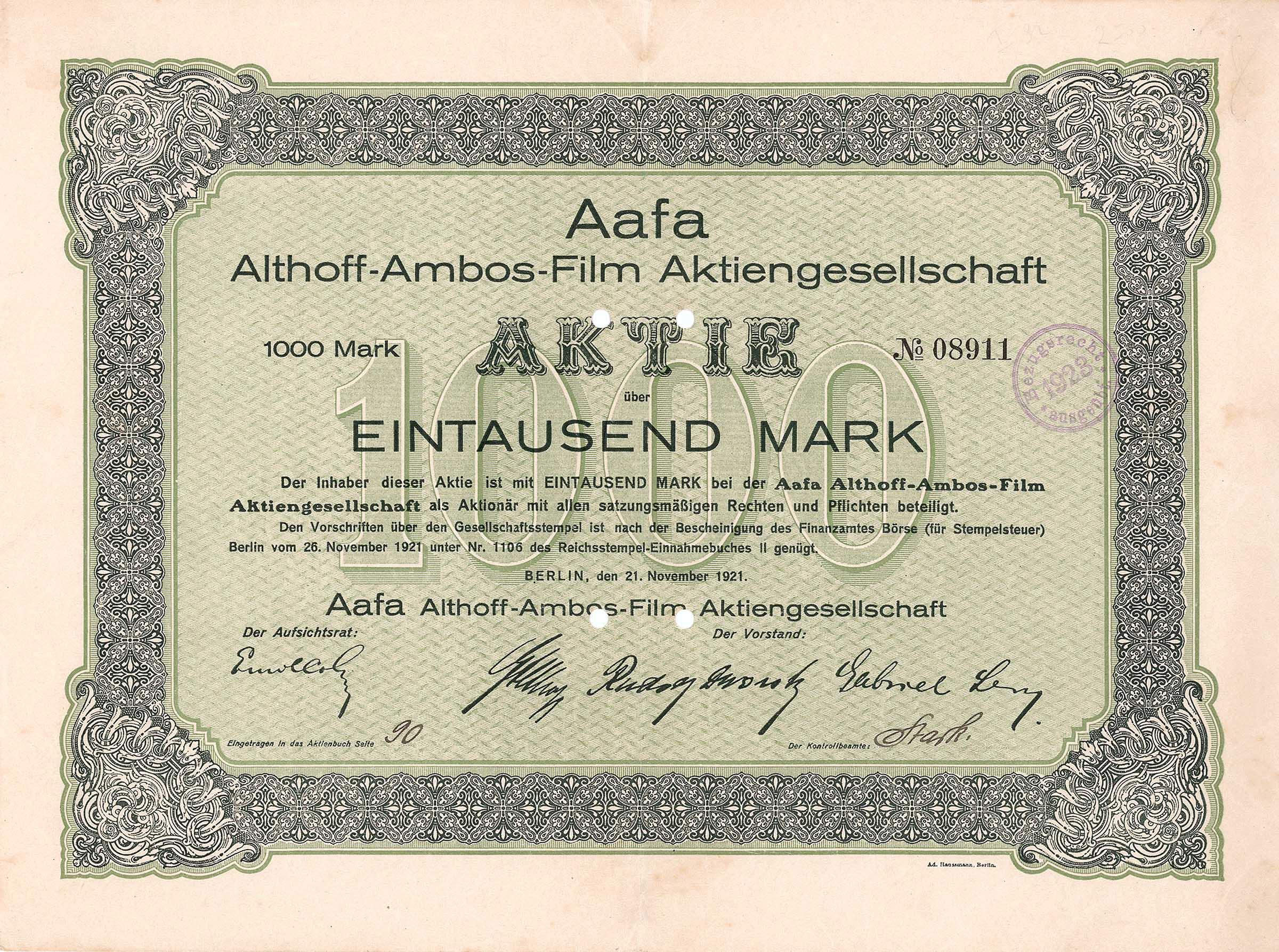
Share of the Aafa Althoff-Ambos-Film AG, issued 21. November 1921; signed by the principals Rudolf Dworsky and Gabriel Levy

Rudolf Franz Dworsky (11 April 1882 in Vienna – 6 July 1927 in Perleberg) was an Austrian and German film producer and director of the Silent era. His production company was called Aafa-Film (Althoff-Ambos-Film), Berlin, the co-owner was the producer Gabriel Levy.

== Selected filmography ==
=== Producer ===
- Ewige Schönheit (1919)
- The Rose of Stamboul (1919)
- Das Attentat (1921)
- Bigamy (1922)
- The Love Nest (1922)
- Lightning (1925)
- The Schimeck Family (1926)
- The Divorcée (1926)
- Rhenish Girls and Rhenish Wine (1927)
- A Girl of the People (1927)

=== Director ===
- William Tell (co-director: Rudolf Walther-Fein, 1923)
- In the Valleys of the Southern Rhine (co-director: Rudolf Walther-Fein, 1925)
- The Fallen (co-director: Rudolf Walther-Fein, 1926)
- Sword and Shield (co-director: Victor Janson, 1926)
- Vienna, How it Cries and Laughs (co-director: Rudolf Walther-Fein, 1926)
- The Divorcée (co-director: Victor Janson, 1926)
- Kissing Is No Sin (co-director: Rudolf Walther-Fein, 1926)
- The Laughing Husband (co-director: Rudolf Walther-Fein, 1926)
- Carnival Magic (co-director: Rudolf Walther-Fein, 1927)
- Rinaldo Rinaldini (co-director: Max Obal, 1927)
- Circle of Lovers (co-director: Rudolf Walther-Fein, 1927)

== Bibliography ==
- Bauche, Freddy. Le cinéma suisse, 1898-1998. L'AGE D'HOMME, 1998.
- Hermanni, Horst O. Von Jean Gabin bis Walter Huston. Books on Demand, 2009.
