= Constantin J. David =

German journalist and filmmaker

- Born: February 18, 1886; Istanbul, Ottoman Empire
- Died: February 19, 1964 (aged 78); Los Angeles, United States
- Occupations: Actor, director, producer, journalist
- Years active: 1925–1949

Constantin J. David (18 February 1886 – 19 February 1964) was a German journalist, film director, film producer, and actor. He is also known for his marriage to the Hungarian actress, singer, and model Käthe von Nagy.

== Biography ==
=== Early life and family ===
The son of a Spanish Jewish mother and a German Jewish father, he lived in Constantinople in the Ottoman Empire, until the age of 16. Once in Germany, David first showed talent as a journalist and writer. He earned his doctorate at the Sorbonne in Paris, and went on to study literature and art in Berlin and then Munich. David then worked for a literary magazine until 1918. In 1921 he founded the International Institute of Modern Art, and from 1922 to 1925 he worked as a producer and co-owner of the German film company Greenbaum Filme.

=== Film career ===
At the beginning of 1925, David took his first steps as a film director with the Greenbaum company's first film as a producer and co-director. After five years in this profession and a handful of moderately interesting productions (including two with his then-wife, actress Käthe von Nagy), he turned back to his studies in literature and art. From 1929 onwards he focused on the establishment of the first Italian sound film studios in Turin and Rome, and soon after he did the same thing in Spain.

=== War years and later life ===
1936, at the outbreak of the Spanish Civil War, David left the country and went via Italy in 1937 to Turkey, where he designed a five-year plan for the state's film-making. During the Second World War David spend most of his time in France, after which he traveled to the United States to continue his film career. Constantin J. David died in 1964.

He married in 1941. He and his wife had two daughters.

== Filmography ==
Year	Title	Notes
1925	Den of Iniquity	
1925	The Untouched Woman	
1926	Our Daily Bread	
1926	Countess Ironing-Maid	
1927	The Girl Without a Homeland	
1927	Men Before Marriage	
1928	Under Suspicion	
1928	The Republic of Flappers	
1929	Diary of a Coquette	
1930	Kennst du das Land?	
1931	Liebeslied	
1931	So beginnen deine Tage	
1935	La romerio del Rocio	short film
1935	La musa y el Fénix	short film
1948	Parole, Inc.	directed by Alfred Zeisler
1949	Alimony	directed by Alfred Zeisler
