= The Clever Fox =

1926 film

- Directed by: Conrad Wiene
- Written by: Johannes Brandt; Conrad Wiene
- Based on: The Clever Fox by Walter Bloem
- Starring: Hans Brausewetter; Clementine Plessner; Werner Pittschau; Harry Hardt
- Cinematography: Willy Goldberger
- Production company: Continental-Film
- Distributed by: Continental-Film
- Release date: 4 March 1926
- Country: Germany
- Languages: Silent; German intertitles

The Clever Fox (German: Der krasse Fuchs) is a 1926 German silent comedy film directed by Conrad Wiene and starring Hans Brausewetter, Clementine Plessner and Werner Pittschau. The film premiered in Berlin on 4 March 1926. It is based on the 1906 novel of the same title by Walter Bloem.

== Cast ==
- Hans Brausewetter as Werner Achenbach
- Clementine Plessner as Witwe Marks
- Werner Pittschau as Willy Klauser
- Harry Hardt as Scholz - Erstchargierter des Corps
- Hanni Reinwald as Lenchen Trimp
- Robert Leffler as Professor Hollerbaum
- Elza Temary as Rose Marks - die Witwes Tochter
- Karl Victor Plagge as Corpsdiener
- Martin Wolfgang as Franz
- Valerie Boothby as Marie
- Angelo Ferrari
- Ludwig Rex

== Bibliography ==
- Grange, William. Cultural Chronicle of the Weimar Republic. Scarecrow Press, 2008.
