= The King's Command (film) =

1926 film

- Directed by: Kurt Blachy
- Written by: Carl Töpfer; Hans Vietzke
- Starring: Grete Reinwald; Fritz Alberti; Hans Brausewetter
- Cinematography: Willy Großstück; Viktor Zimmerman
- Music by: Hans May
- Production company: Naxos-Film
- Release date: August 1926
- Country: Germany
- Languages: Silent; German intertitles

The King's Command (German:Des Königs Befehl) is a 1926 German silent film directed by Kurt Blachy and starring Grete Reinwald, Fritz Alberti and Hans Brausewetter.

== Cast ==
- Georg Burghardt as Frederick the Great
- Grete Reinwald as Baroness Wendel
- Hanni Reinwald as Her Sister
- Hans Brausewetter as Prussian Leutnant
- Hans Stüwe as Prussian Leutnant
- Fritz Alberti
- Eduard von Winterstein
- Leopold von Ledebur
- Karl Platen
- Georg John

== Bibliography ==
- Murray, Bruce Arthur. Film and the German Left in the Weimar Republic: From Caligari to Kuhle Wampe. University of Texas Press, 1990.
