= Nanette Makes Everything =

1926 film directed by Carl Boese

- German: Nanette macht alles
- Directed by: Carl Boese
- Written by: Georg C. Klaren
- Starring: Mady Christians; Georg Alexander; Vivian Gibson
- Cinematography: Alfred Hansen
- Music by: Eduard Prasch
- Production company: Terra Film
- Distributed by: Terra Film
- Release date: 15 March 1926
- Running time: 76 minutes
- Country: Germany
- Languages: Silent; German intertitles

Nanette Makes Everything (German: Nanette macht alles) is a 1926 German silent film directed by Carl Boese and starring Mady Christians, Georg Alexander and Vivian Gibson. It was shot at the Terra Studios in Berlin. The film's sets were designed by the art director Oscar Werndorff.

== Cast ==
- Mady Christians as Nanette
- Georg Alexander as Hans Haffner
- Vivian Gibson as Henny, Frau Haffner
- Fritz Kampers as Gustav, Nanettes Braütigam
- Sig Arno as Hugo Klohne, einDamenfreund
- Fritz Spira as Friedrich Westmann, Haffners Chef
- Trude Lehmann as Anna, Köchin
