= German Hearts on the German Rhine =

1926 film

- Directed by: Fred Sauer
- Written by: Max Jungk; Julius Urgiß
- Starring: Gyula Szőreghy; Frieda Lehndorf; Hans Albers
- Cinematography: Willy Goldberger
- Music by: Felix Bartsch
- Production company: Boston-Films
- Release date: 22 April 1926
- Country: Germany
- Languages: Silent; German intertitles

German Hearts on the German Rhine (German: Deutsche Herzen am deutschen Rhein) is a 1926 German silent film directed by Fred Sauer and starring Gyula Szőreghy, Frieda Lehndorf, and Hans Albers.

The film's sets were designed by Willi Herrmann.

== Cast ==
- Gyula Szőreghy
- Frieda Lehndorf
- Hans Albers
- Rudolf Del Zopp
- Eberhard Leithoff
- Grete Reinwald
- Adele Sandrock
- Hans Adalbert Schlettow
- Editha Seidel
- Manja Walowska

== Bibliography ==
- Krautz, Alfred (1984). International Directory of Cinematographers, Set- and Costume Designers in Film. Vol. 4. Munich: Saur. ISBN 978-3-598-21434-9.
