= Mady Christians =

Austrian-born German-American actress

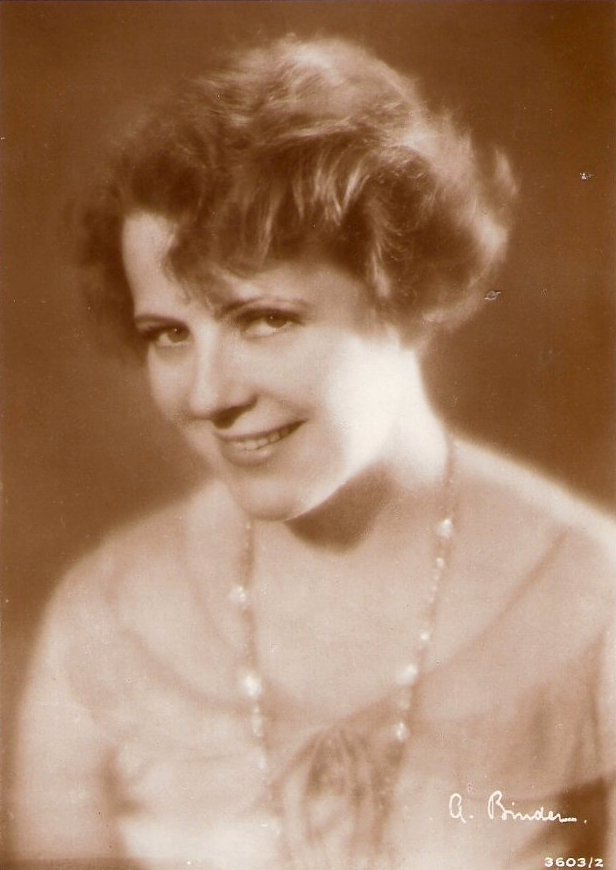
- Born: Marguerita Maria Christians; January 19, 1892; Vienna, Austria-Hungary
- Died: October 28, 1951 (aged 59); Norwalk, Connecticut, U.S.
- Years active: 1916–1949
- Spouse: Sven von Müller (editor of the Hamburger Fremdenblatt)
- Relatives: Christa Tordy (cousin)

Marguerita Maria Christians (January 19, 1892 – October 28, 1951), known as Mady Christians, was an Austrian-born German-American actress who had a successful acting career in theater and film in Europe and the United States until she was blacklisted during the McCarthy period.

== Biography ==
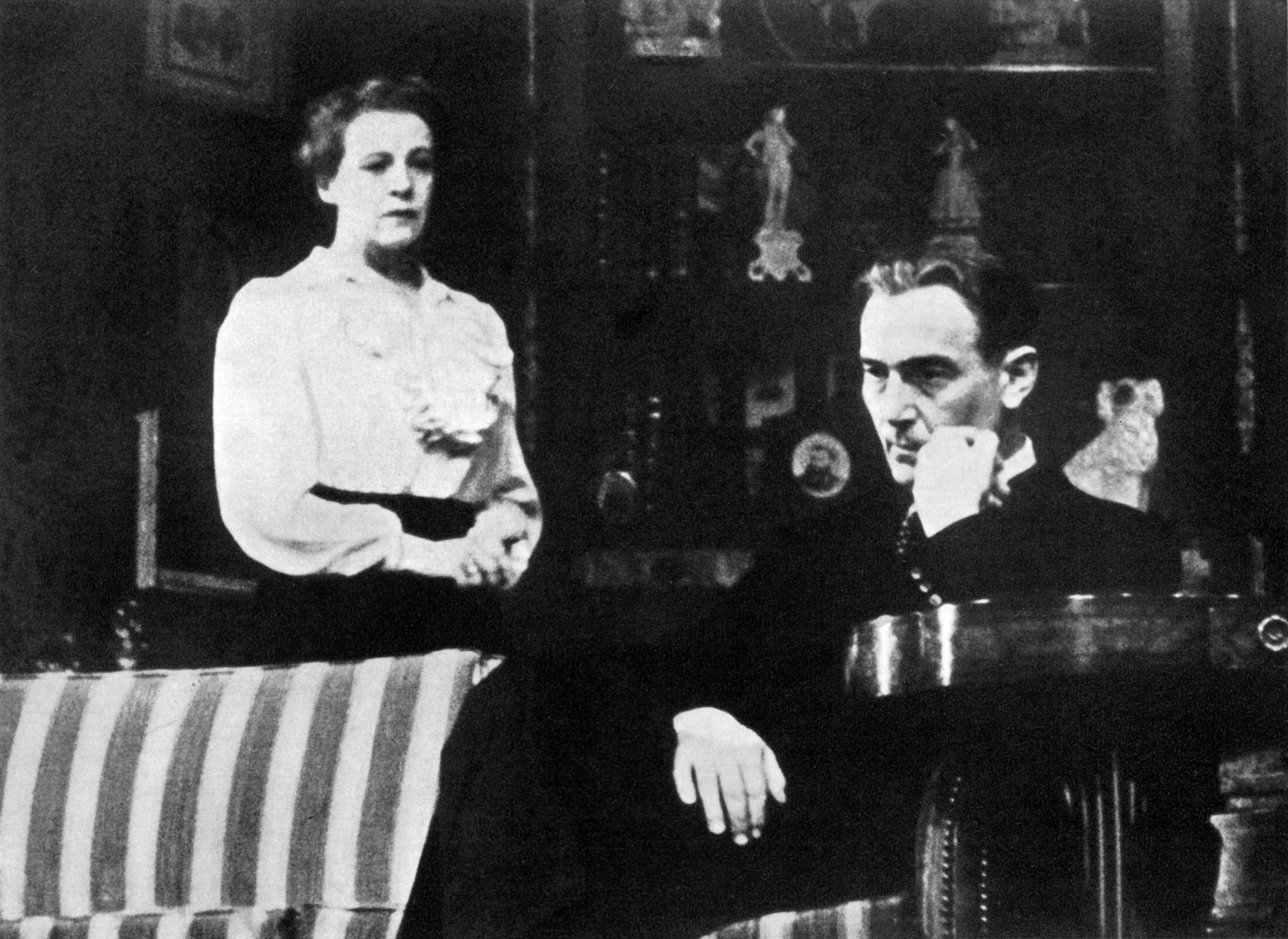
Mady Christians and Paul Lukas in the original Broadway production of Lillian Hellman's Watch on the Rhine (1941)

Christians was born in Vienna on January 19, 1892, the daughter of Rudolf Christians and Bertha (née Klein) Christians. Her father was a well-known German actor. Her family moved to Berlin when she was one year old, and to New York City in 1912, where her father became the Irving Place Theatre's general manager. Five years later she returned to Europe to study under Max Reinhardt.

She appeared in several European films before the early 1930s. In 1929, she starred in the first full sound film made in Germany It's You I Have Loved. In 1933, she toured the United States in a play called Marching By and was offered a Broadway contract the following year that allowed her, as with several other German artists, to seek refuge in the United States from the Nazi regime.

On Broadway, Christians played Queen Gertrude in Hamlet, and Lady Percy in Henry IV, Part I, staged by director Margaret Webster. Webster was part of a small but influential group of lesbian producers, directors, and actors in the theater (a group that included Eva Le Gallienne and Cheryl Crawford). Webster and Christians became close friends. According to Webster biographer Milly S. Barranger, it is likely that they also were lovers.

She also starred in Lillian Hellman's Watch on the Rhine. She originated the title role in the 1944 play I Remember Mama. Her last film roles were in All My Sons, based on the play by Arthur Miller, and Letter from an Unknown Woman, both released in 1948. On February 13, 1949, Christians starred in "Silver Cord", an episode of Ford Television Theatre on CBS.

During World War II, Christians was involved in political work on behalf of refugees, rights for workers (especially in theater and film), and Russian War relief, political efforts that brought her to the attention of the Federal Bureau of Investigation (FBI) and other anti-communist institutions and organizations.

== Blacklisting ==
In addition to her political work, Christians publicly criticized the House Committee on Un-American Activities in early 1941 and likened the Senate Internal Security Subcommittee's investigation of propaganda in US film to Nazi harassment of film and radio artists in the 1930s.

In 1950, the FBI's internal security division began investigating Christians, who had been identified as a "concealed communist" by a confidential informant. When Christians' name appeared in Red Channels, the so-called bible of the broadcast blacklist, her career was effectively over.

== Death ==
On October 28, 1951, aged 59, Christians died of a cerebral hemorrhage, which some attributed to the stress of being subjected to FBI surveillance and being blacklisted.

== Selected filmography ==
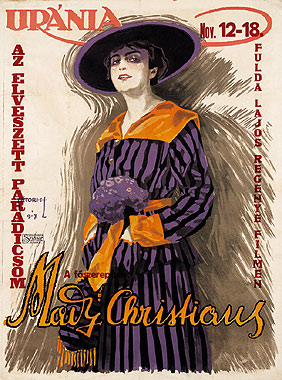
Hungarian poster for the 1917 German film Das verlorene Paradies (The Lost Paradise)

- Audrey (1916) as Evelyn Byrd
- Die Krone von Kerkyra (1917)
- The Lost Paradise (1917) as Edith Bernardi
- Die fremde Frau (1917)
- Am Scheidewege (1918) as Cornelia
- Frau Marias Erlebnis (1918) as Maria - ihre Tochter
- Die Verteidigerin (1918) as Linda Saltarin - Doktor der Rechte
- Die Dreizehn (1918)
- Eine junge Dame von Welt (1918)
- Nightshade (film) (1918) as Fürstin Tscharkowska
- Am anderen Ufer (1918)
- Fidelio (1919) as Sonja Maderewska - singer
- Die Sühne der Martha Marx (1919) as Mady
- The Peruvian (1919) as Fernades Matamorer
- The Golden Club (1919) as Marga von Olsberg, junge Witwe
- Not und Verbrechen (1919) as Ruth
- Die Nacht des Grauens (1919)
- Die Gesunkenen (1919) as Reta de Lorni
- Der indische Tod (1920) as Inge, Frau von Ralph Leyen
- Indian Revenge (1920)
- Wer unter Euch ohne Sünde ist... (1921)
- Peter Voss, Thief of Millions (1921, part 1–7) as Gert, seine Tochter
- The Fateful Day (1921) as Felicitas / Harriet Steel / Jelena / Marietta
- Today's Children (1922) as Eva
- The Loves of Pharaoh (1922)
- It Illuminates, My Dear (1922) as Jeanne, Marquiße von Chatelet
- A Glass of Water (1923) as Königin Anna
- The Buddenbrooks (1923) as Gerda Arnoldsen
- The Lost Shoe (1923) as Violante
- The Weather Station (1923) as Die Dame
- The Grand Duke's Finances (1924) as Grand Duchess Olga von Rußland
- Michael (1924) as Frau (uncredited)
- Debit and Credit (1924) as Baroneß Leonore vin Rothensattel
- Man Against Man (1924)
- Slums of Berlin (1925) as Regine Lossen
- In the Valleys of the Southern Rhine (1925, part 1–2) as Bettina von Wittelsbach
- The Farmer from Texas (1925) as Mabel Bratt
- A Waltz Dream (1925) as Princess Alix
- The Adventurers (1926) as Armely - seine Frau
- Nanette Makes Everything (1926) as Nanette
- Sword and Shield (1926) as Prinzessin Wilhelmine
- The World Wants To Be Deceived (1926) as Sefi - seine Tochter
- The Queen of Moulin Rouge (1926) as Die Herzogin
- The Divorcée (1926) as Gonda van der Loo
- Vienna, How it Cries and Laughs (1926) as Mery, seine Frau
- Out of the Mist (1927) as Lore
- Queen Louise (1927-1928, part 1, 2) as Luise von Mecklenburg, Königin von Preussen
- Grand Hotel (1927)
- Homesick (1927) as Fürstin Lydia Trubezkoj
- The Duel (1927)
- Miss Chauffeur (1928) as Steffi Walker
- A Woman with Style (1928) as Dschilly Bey
- The Burning Heart (1929) as Dorothee Claudius
- The Runaway Princess (1929) as Princess Priscilla
- My Sister and I (1929) as Prinzessin Margarete von Marquardstein
- It's You I Have Loved (1929) as Inge Lund
- Lieutenant, Were You Once a Hussar? (1930) as Königin Alexandra von Gregorien
- My Heart Incognito (1931) as La reine Alexandra
- The Fate of Renate Langen (1931) as Renate Langen
- The Woman They Talk About (1931) as Vera Moretti
- The Black Hussar (1932) as Marie Luise
- Frederica (1932) as Friederike
- The House of Dora Green (1933) as Dora Green
- The Empress and I (1933) as Empress
- Manolescu, Prince of Thieves (1933) as Comtesse Maria Freyenberg
- The Only Girl (1933) as The Empress
- A Wicked Woman (1934) as Naomi Trice
- Escapade (1935) as Anita
- Ship Cafe (1935) as Countess Boranoff
- Come and Get It (1936) as Karie Linbeck
- Seventh Heaven (1937) as Marie
- The Woman I Love (1937) as Florence
- Heidi (1937) as Dete
- Tender Comrade (1943) as Manya Lodge
- Address Unknown (1944) as Elsa Schulz
- All My Sons (1948) as Kate Keller
- Letter from an Unknown Woman (1948) as Frau Berndle
