= Willy Krauß =

German footballer

Personal information
- Date of birth: 10 February 1886
- Position: Midfielder

Senior career*
| Years | Team | Apps | (Gls) |
- FC Carl Zeiss Jena

International career
| 1911–1912 | Germany | 2 | (0) |
- * Club domestic league appearances and goals

Willy Krauß (born 10 February 1886, date of death unknown) was a German international footballer.
