= Renate Brausewetter =

German actress (1905–2006)

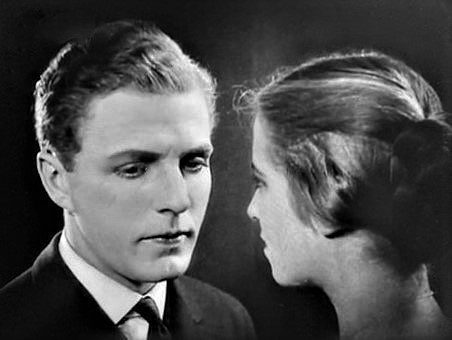
Renate Brausewetter (right) with actor Werner Pittschau in a still from the film Hanseaten (1925).

Renate Brausewetter (Málaga, 1 October 1905 – Linz am Rhein, 20 August 2006) was a Spanish-born German silent film actress. She was the younger sister of famous German actor Hans Brausewetter.

Brausewetter was born in Málaga, Spain, moving to Berlin, Germany in 1915. She made her screen debut in 1925's Die freudlose Gasse (The Joyless Street), appearing alongside Greta Garbo. Brausewetter appeared in over a dozen silent films, but retired from acting in 1928 before the advent of sound. She appeared in only one sound picture, 1950's The Staircase.

Brausewetter was living in a retirement home in Linz am Rhein when she died of natural causes on 20 August 2006, aged 100. She is buried in the English Cemetery in Málaga.

== Selected filmography ==
- The Hanseatics (1925)
- Den of Iniquity (1925)
- Secrets of a Soul (1926)
- People to Each Other (1926)
- Tough Guys, Easy Girls (1927)
- The Lorelei (1927)
- The Old Fritz (1928)
- The Staircase (1950)
