= Rolf Randolf =

Austrian actor

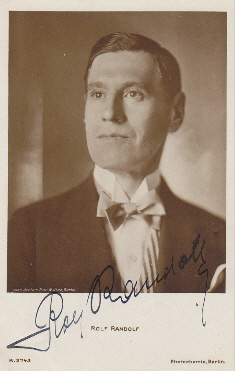
- Randolf c. 1918
- Born: Rudolf Zanbauer; 15 January 1878; Vienna, Austria-Hungary
- Died: 29 June 1941 (aged 63); Vienna, Ostmark
- Years active: 1901–1941

Rolf Randolf (born Rudolf Zanbauer; 15 January 1878 – 29 June 1941) was an Austrian actor, film producer and director.

== Selected filmography ==
Director

- Das Geheimnis der Santa Margherita (1921)
- Wallenstein (1925)
- What the Stones Tell (1925)
- Women of Passion (1926)
- Das Geheimnis von St. Pauli (1926)
- The Beggar from Cologne Cathedral (1927)
- Linden Lady on the Rhine (1927)
- Love on Skis (1928)
- The House Without Men (1928)
- Mikosch Comes In (1928)
- Wer hat Bobby gesehen? (1930)
- Oh Those Glorious Old Student Days (1930)
- Death Over Shanghai (1932)
- The Sporck Battalion (1934)
- The Red Rider (1935)
- Königstiger (1935)
- The Right to Love (1939)
- Passion (1940)

=== Producer ===
- The Adventurer of Paris (1936)
- Lightning Around Barbara (1941)

== Bibliography ==
- Kester, Bernadette. Film Front Weimar: Representations of the First World War in German films of the Weimar Period (1919-1933). Amsterdam University Press, 2003.
