= Ich hatt' einen Kameraden (disambiguation) =

Ich hatt' einen Kameraden is a traditional lament of the German armed forces written in 1809.

Ich hatt' einen Kameraden is also a German-language title for:

- The Good Comrade, 1923 German film
- I Had a Comrade, 1924 German film
- I Once Had a Comrade, 1926 German film
