= Lya De Putti =

Hungarian actress (1897–1931)

Lya de Putti
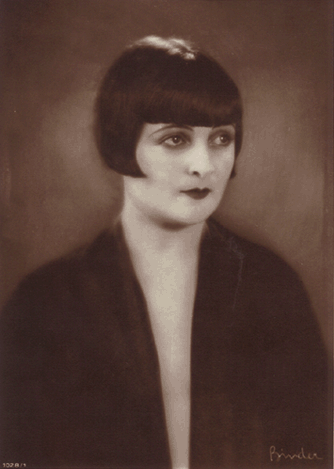
- Photograph of de Putti taken by Alexander Binder, c. 1928
- Born: Amália Helena Mária Róza Putti; 10 January 1896; Vécse, Austria-Hungary, (modern-day Vojčice, Slovakia)
- Died: 27 November 1931 (aged 35); New York City, New York, U.S.
- Other name: Lia de Putti
- Occupation: Actress
- Years active: 1918–1929
- Spouses: Zoltán Szepessy (m. 1913; div. 1918) Ludwig Christensen (m. 1920; died 1922) Louis Jahnke (m. 1922)
- Children: 2

Lya de Putti (born Amália Helena Mária Róza Putti; Hungarian: Putti Amália Helena Mária Róza, 10 January 1896 – 27 November 1931) was a Hungarian film actress during the silent era. She was noted for her portrayals of vamp characters.

== Early life and career ==
Amália Helena Mária Róza Putti was born in Vécse, Austria-Hungary on 10 January 1896 (however, the date of birth on her tombstone says 1899), one of four siblings born to Gyula Julián Gábor József Putti (Hungarian: Putti Gyula Julián Gábor József, 1863–1901), a cavalry officer, and his wife, Mária Rozália Kamilla, Countess Hoyos Baroness to Stichsenstein (Hungarian: Hoyos Mária Rozália Kamilla, 1868–1945). She had two brothers, Géza and Sándor, the latter serving as a first lieutenant in the Austro-Hungarian army, and a sister, Mária. She began her stage career on the Hungarian vaudeville circuit. She soon progressed to Berlin, where after performing in the ballet, she made her screen debut in 1918. She became the premiere danseuse at the Berlin Wintergarten in 1924.

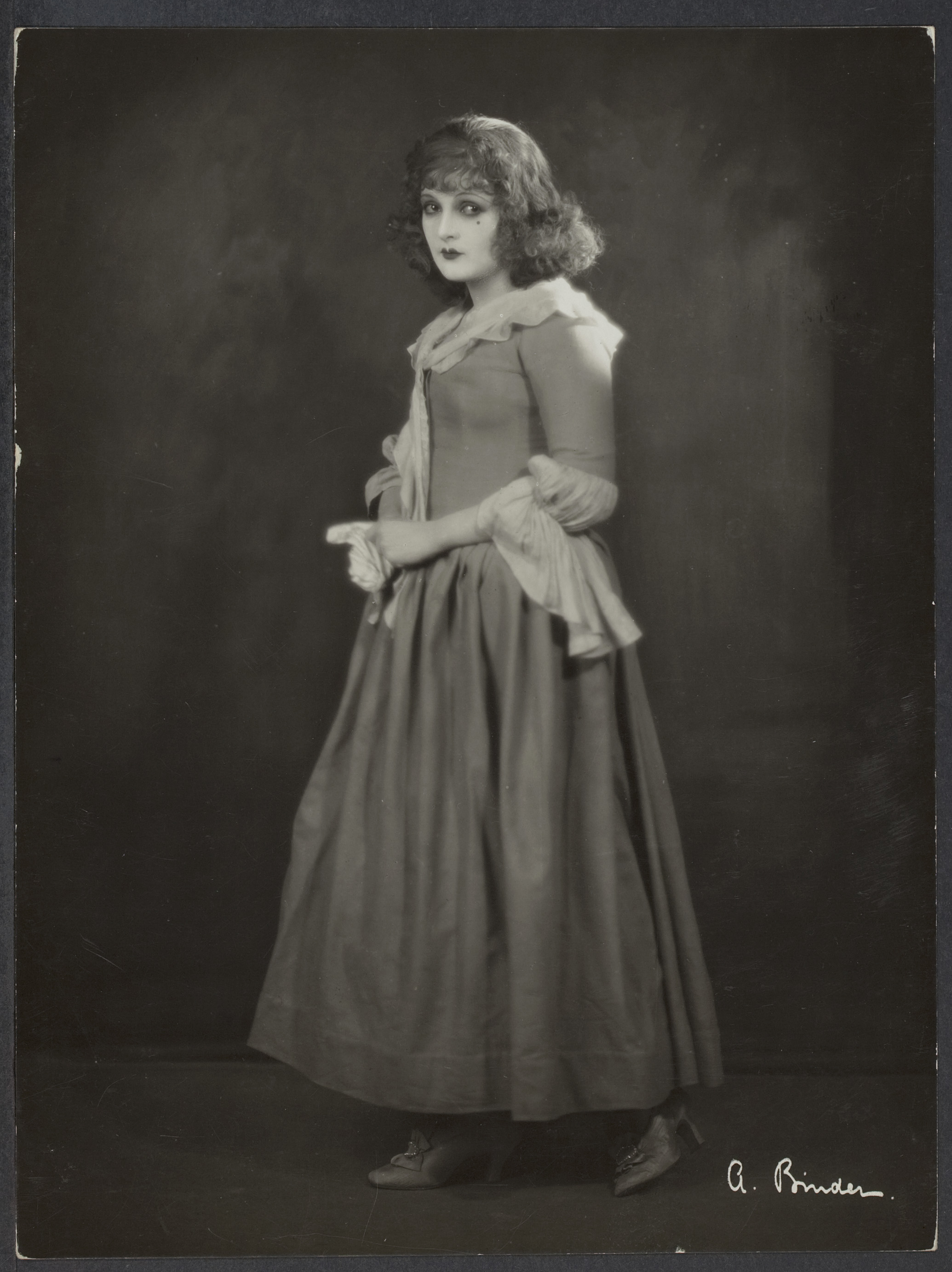
Lya de Putti in the film Manon Lescaut (1926) by Arthur Robinson. Photography by Alexander Binder. Collection EYE Film Institute Netherlands.

Around that time German film director Joe May noticed her and cast her in The Mistress of the World (1919), her first important film. She followed this success with noteworthy performances in Manon Lescaut and Varieté (1925). The latter featured her opposite Emil Jannings and directed by E.A. Dupont. Both films are UFA productions. While in Germany, de Putti starred with such actors as Conrad Veidt, Alfred Abel, Werner Krauss, Grete Mosheim, and Lil Dagover, and was filmed by such directors F.W. Murnau and Fritz Lang.

De Putti came to America in February 1926. At the time, she told reporters she was 22 years old but her ocean liner's records list her as having been 26. De Putti generally was cast as a "vamp" character, often wearing her dark hair short in a style similar to that of Louise Brooks or Colleen Moore. De Putti starred in D. W. Griffith's The Sorrows of Satan (1926). The film was released in two versions, one shown in the U.S. and the other in Europe. In the U.S. version, one scene had de Putti fully dressed whereas the same scene in the European release had de Putti topless.

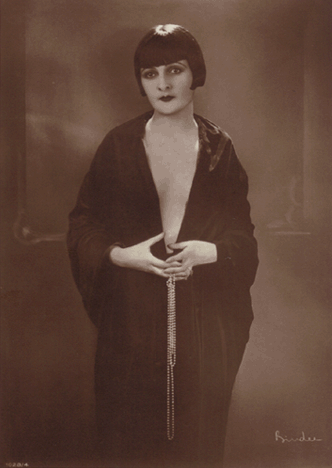
de Putti c. 1928

The following year, she went to Hollywood but found little success. Despite working with distinguished actors such as Adolphe Menjou and Zasu Pitts, she failed to make it big and left the screen by 1929 to attempt to restart her career on Broadway. Later, she went to England to make silent movies and studied the English language. She then returned to the U.S. to attempt sound films.

== Alleged suicide attempts and death ==
On 5 March 1926, the Ogden Standard Examiner published a story alleging that de Putti had attempted suicide by jumping out of her apartment window at the Wilmersdorf quarters. She and her lover of one year, who was also an actor, had been arguing prior to the attempt. One of her arms and a foot was broken as a result of the fall. She later claimed she had been saying goodbye to friends when she leaned too far over the railing and fell.

In November 1927, de Putti was injured when she fell down the stairs and through a window. Some press accounts speculated that it was another suicide attempt, but de Putti denied this.

De Putti nearly died in August 1930 when the small plane she was flying in crashed. In 1931, she was hospitalized to have a chicken bone removed from her throat. De Putti contracted a throat infection, and was taken to the Harbor Sanitarium, then located at 667 Madison Avenue, where reportedly she behaved irrationally and eluded her nurses. Eventually, she was found in a corridor. She developed pleurisy in her right side, followed by pneumonia in both lungs.

Lya de Putti died at 1:05 A.M. on 27 November 1931, aged 35, at the Harbor Sanitorium, leaving just $1,100 and a few bits of jewelry. She is interred in the Ferncliff Cemetery in Hartsdale, New York.

== Personal life ==
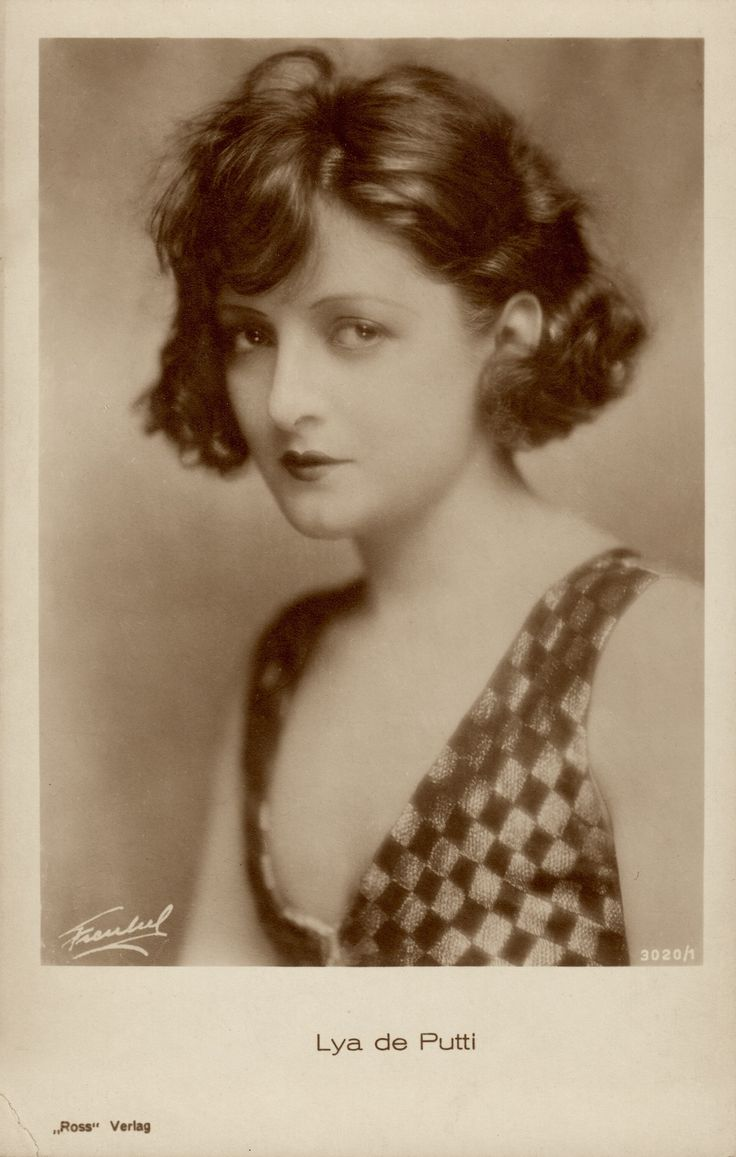
de Putti c. 1929

In 1913, she married Zoltán Szepessy de Négyes, a county magistrate at least 10 years her senior. The couple had two daughters, Ilona (born 1914) and Judit (born 1916). Upon divorcing in 1918, Szepessy told their two daughters that their mother had died; there was even a headstone in a Hungarian cemetery that bore the inscription 'Lya de Putti - died 1920'. On 8 March 1932, Szepessy committed suicide in a Budapest hotel due to financial difficulties and grief over de Putti's death; it was not until his death that Ilona and Judit learned about their mother's true fate.

She remarried in 1922 to Louis Jahnke, a Norwegian diplomat. Prior to Jahnke, she was married to the Norwegian merchant Ludwig Christensen, who left her widowed when he died of tuberculosis in 1922.

In the late 1920s, de Putti met banker Walter D. Blumenthal. They began a relationship, and de Putti fell in love and wanted to marry him. His family did not allow the marriage, however, which resulted in de Putti going on a hunger strike in 1931. De Putti once was rumored to be engaged to Count Ludwig von Salm-Hoogstraeten, a former husband of oil heiress Millicent Rogers. She denied the engagement.

== Lya de Putti in popular culture ==
- De Putti appears on the cover of Jessamine's 1995 self-titled album Jessamine.
- In the film Cabaret (1972), singer Sally Bowles (Liza Minnelli) tells a friend that Lya de Putti is her "favorite screen siren". In a subsequent scene, Bowles dismisses de Putti, claiming that she "makes too many faces."
- Lya de Putti's life and work are dramatized in the novel Winter Under Water (Picador, 2007) by J.A. Hopkin.

== Filmography ==
=== Features ===
- The Emperor's Soldiers (1918)
- On the Waves of Happiness (1920)
- Gypsy Blood (1920)
- You Are the Life (1921)
- The Indian Tomb (1921)
- The Love Affairs of Hector Dalmore (1921)
- Driving Force (1921)
- Ilona (1921)
- Othello (1922)
- The Burning Soil (1922)
- Phantom (1922)
- The Three Marys (1923)
- The Ravine of Death (1923)
- Die Fledermaus (1923)
- The Island of Tears (1923)
- Thamar, The Child of the Mountains (1924)
- Malva (1924)
- Claire (1924)
- In the Name of the Kaisers (1925)
- Comedians (1925)
- Varieté (1925)
- Jealousy (1925)
- Manon Lescaut (1926)
- Young Blood (1926)
- The Sorrows of Satan (1926)
- Prince of Tempters (1926)
- God Gave Me Twenty Cents (1926)
- The Heart Thief (1927)
- Buck Privates (1928)
- Midnight Rose (1928)
- Charlotte Somewhat Crazy (1928)
- The Scarlet Lady (1928)
- All About Love (1929)
- The Informer (1929)

=== Short subjects ===
- A Christmas Movie for Adults (1924)

=== Documentaries ===
- Cinema Europe: The Other Hollywood (1995)
- The Love Goddesses (1965)
- Herrliche Zeiten (Wonderful Times) (1950)

== Sources ==
- Herzog, Peter and Roman Tozzi. Lya de Putti: Living Life and Not Fearing Death. Corvin: 1993.
- Los Angeles Times. "Film Star Succumbs." 27 November 1931, Page 1.
- New York Times. "Lya de Putti Dead Here of Pneumonia." 27 November 1931, Page 20.
