= From the Files of a Respectable Woman =

1920 film by Franz Hofer

- Directed by: Franz Hofer
- Written by: Hedwig Hard (novel); Franz Hofer
- Produced by: Franz Hofer
- Starring: Margit Barnay; Olga Engl; Fred Immler
- Cinematography: Kurt Lande
- Edited by: Franz Hofer
- Production company: Hofer-Film
- Release date: 1920
- Country: Germany
- Languages: Silent; German intertitles

From the Files of a Respectable Woman (German: Aus den Akten einer anständigen Frau) is a 1920 German silent comedy film directed by Franz Hofer and starring Margit Barnay, Olga Engl and Fred Immler.

The film's sets were designed by the art director Julian Ballenstedt.

== Cast ==
- Margit Barnay as Ingeborg Andersen
- Olga Engl as Olly Andersen, Mutter
- Fred Immler as Preben Andersen
- Ebba Holm as Helga Andersen
- Fritz Beckmann as Herr Erdmann
- Frieda Wrede as Frau Erdmann
- Grete Sens as Tochter Erdmann
- Preben J. Rist as Prosecutor
- Ellen Isenta as Zimmervermieterin
- Hermann Picha as Hausbewohner
- Olaf Storm as Flanke, Privatedetektiv

== Bibliography ==
- Grange, William. Cultural Chronicle of the Weimar Republic. Scarecrow Press, 2008.
