= The Night of the Medici =

1922 film

- Directed by: Karl Grune
- Starring: Werner Krauss; Alfred Abel
- Release date: 1922
- Country: Germany
- Languages: Silent; German intertitles

The Night of the Medici (German:Die Nacht der Medici) is a 1922 German silent film directed by Karl Grune.

== Cast ==
- Werner Krauss
- Alfred Abel
- Albert Steinrück

== Bibliography ==
- James Robert Parish & Kingsley Canham. Film Directors Guide: Western Europe. Scarecrow Press, 1976.
