= Tatjana (film) =

1923 film directed by Robert Dinesen

- Directed by: Robert Dinesen
- Written by: Harriet Bloch; Robert Dinesen
- Produced by: Erich Pommer
- Starring: Olga Chekhova; Paul Hartmann; Leopold von Ledebur
- Cinematography: Carl Drews
- Music by: Guido Bagier
- Production company: Messter Film
- Distributed by: UFA
- Release date: 27 September 1923
- Country: Germany
- Languages: Silent; German intertitles

Tatjana is a 1923 German silent film directed by Robert Dinesen and starring Olga Chekhova, Paul Hartmann and Leopold von Ledebur.

== Cast ==
- Olga Chekhova as Tatjana
- Paul Hartmann as Fedja Gorykin
- Robert Dinesen as Fürst Boris Orloff
- Leopold von Ledebur as Graf Schuwaloff
- Maria Peterson as Ulidtka, Fedjas Mutter
- Albert Patry
- Karl Platen
- Paul Rehkopf
- Charolia Strakosch
- Max Wogritsch

== Bibliography ==
- Hans-Michael Bock and Tim Bergfelder. The Concise Cinegraph: An Encyclopedia of German Cinema. Berghahn Books.
