= Explosion (1923 film) =

1923 film

- Directed by: Karl Grune
- Written by: Max Jungk; Julius Urgiß
- Produced by: Karl Grune
- Starring: Liane Haid; Carl de Vogt
- Cinematography: Karl Hasselmann
- Production company: Stern-Film
- Distributed by: UFA
- Release date: January 1923
- Running time: 97 minutes
- Country: Germany
- Languages: Silent; German intertitles

Explosion (German: Schlagende Wetter) is a 1923 German silent film directed by Karl Grune and starring Liane Haid and Carl de Vogt. It was shot at the Marienfelde Studios in Berlin.

== Cast ==
- Liane Haid
- Walter Brügmann
- Carl de Vogt
- Leonhard Haskel
- Fritz Kampers
- Eugen Klöpfer
- Charles Lincoln
- Adele Reuter-Eichberg
- Hermann Vallentin

== Bibliography ==
- Parish, James Robert; Canham, Kingsley (1976). Film Directors Guide: Western Europe. Metuchen, NJ: Scarecrow Press. ISBN 978-0-8108-0908-6.
- Diner, Dan; Reuveni, Gideon; Weiss, Yfaat, eds. (2012). Deutsche Zeiten: Geschichte und Lebenswelt. Festschrift zur Emeritierung von Moshe Zimmermann (in German). Göttingen: Vandenhoeck & Ruprecht. ISBN 978-3-525-30164-7.
