= Claire (1924 film) =

1924 film directed by Robert Dinesen

- Directed by: Robert Dinesen
- Written by: Robert Liebmann
- Produced by: Paul Ebner; Maxim Galitzenstein
- Starring: Lya De Putti; Eduard von Winterstein; Theodor Loos
- Cinematography: Julius Balting
- Music by: Felix Bartsch
- Production company: Maxim-Film
- Distributed by: Süd-Film
- Release date: 25 October 1924
- Country: Germany
- Languages: Silent; German intertitles

Claire is a 1924 German silent film directed by Robert Dinesen and starring Lya De Putti, Eduard von Winterstein and Theodor Loos.

== Cast ==
- Lya De Putti
- Eduard von Winterstein
- Theodor Loos
- Erich Kaiser-Titz
- Frida Richard
- Maria Peterson
- Eberhard Leithoff
- Alfred Haase
- Johanna Zimmermann

== Bibliography ==
- Bock, Hans-Michael & Bergfelder, Tim. The Concise CineGraph. Encyclopedia of German Cinema. Berghahn Books, 2009.
