= Riding for Germany =

1941 film directed by Arthur Maria Rabenalt

- German: Reitet für Deutschland
- Directed by: Arthur Maria Rabenalt
- Written by: Josef Maria Frank; Clemens Laar; Fritz Reck-Malleczewen; Karl Friedrich Freiherr von Langen; Richard H. Riedel
- Produced by: Richard H. Riedel
- Starring: Willy Birgel; Gertrud Eysoldt; Gerhild Weber; Rudolf Schündler
- Cinematography: Werner Krien
- Edited by: Kurt Hampp
- Music by: Alois Melichar
- Production company: UFA
- Distributed by: UFA
- Release date: 11 April 1941
- Running time: 92 minutes
- Country: Nazi Germany
- Language: German

Riding for Germany (German: Reitet für Deutschland) is a 1941 German drama film directed by Arthur Maria Rabenalt and starring Willy Birgel, Gertrud Eysoldt and Gerhild Weber. A German cavalry officer, badly injured during the First World War, emerges as a leading competitor in post-war equestrian events.

== Cast ==
- Willy Birgel as Rittmeister Ernst von Brenken
- Gertrud Eysoldt as Tante Ulle
- Gerhild Weber as Tomasia Kolrep
- Herbert A.E. Böhme as Olav Kolrep
- Willi Rose as Karl Marten
- Rudolf Schündler as Generaldirektor Brenner
- Paul Dahlke as Dolinski
- Hans Zesch-Ballot as Brigadekommandeur
- Walter Werner as Geheimrat
- Gerhard Dammann as Fuhrwerksbesitzer
- Hans Quest as Sohn des Fuhrwerksbesitzers
- Peter Elsholtz as Deutscher Ulan
- Herbert Hübner as Pferdehändler
- Karl Kahlmann as Regierungspräsident
- Walter Lieck as Prosiger, Pferdehändler
- Ruth Lommel as Junge Frau
- Klaus Pohl as Gerichtsvollzieher
- Armin Schweizer as Kapellmeister
- Karl Junge-Swinburne as Leiter des Reitturniers
- Angelo Ferrari as Italienischer Offizier
- Karl Jüstel as Ausländischer Offizier
- Jakob Sinn as Henseleit, Gutsinspektor
- Marianne Stanior as Brenners Sekretärin
- Wolfgang Staudte as Rebenschütz, Wachtmeister
- Ewald Wenck as Alter Kutscher
- Franz Ernst Bochum as Brenkens Diener
- Fanny Cotta as Krankenschwester
- Herbert Gernot as Voigt, Ordonanzoffizier
- Willi Witte as Ordonanzoffizier
- Knut Hartwig as Polizei-Wachtmeister
- Leopold von Ledebur as Toms Logennachbar in Genf
- Benno Mueller as Stationsvorstand
- Jaspar von Oertzen as Von Burt, Adjutant des Kommandeurs
- Hellmuth Passarge as horse dealer
- Ernst Rotmund as Galician horse dealer
- Eduard Wenck as Pferdehändler
- Anton Pointner as reporter
- Paul Rehkopf as Reinboth, Futtermeister
- Ferdinand Robert as employee of the race management
- Walter Steinweg as German officer

== See also ==
- List of films about horses
