= Bigamy (1922 film) =

1922 film

- Directed by: Rudolf Walther-Fein
- Written by: Toni Dathe-Fabri
- Based on: The Living Corpse (play) by Leo Tolstoy
- Produced by: Rudolf Dworsky
- Starring: Alfred Abel; Margit Barnay; Reinhold Schünzel
- Cinematography: Kurt Lande; Johannes Männling
- Production company: Aafa-Film
- Distributed by: Aafa-Film
- Release date: 8 December 1922
- Country: Germany
- Languages: Silent; German intertitles

Bigamy (German: Bigamie) is a 1922 German silent drama film directed by Rudolf Walther-Fein and starring Alfred Abel, Margit Barnay, and Reinhold Schünzel.

The film's sets were designed by the art director Siegfried Wroblewsky.

== Cast ==
- Alfred Abel as Fedja
- Margit Barnay as Lisawetha
- Reinhold Schünzel as Alexandroff
- Eduard von Winterstein
- Wilhelm Diegelmann
- Olga Engl
- Ilka Grüning
- Margarete Kupfer
- Hermann Picha
- Clementine Plessner
- Friedrich Kühne
- Emil Albes
- Lili Alexandra
- Fritz Beckmann
- Hermann Böttcher
- Tina de Jarque
- Leonhard Haskel
- Bernecke Heinz
- Ernst Pröckl
- Robert Scholz

== Bibliography ==
- Grange, William (2008). Cultural Chronicle of the Weimar Republic. Lanham, MD: Scarecrow Press. ISBN 978-0-8108-5967-8.
