= The Secret of Bombay =

1921 film

- Directed by: Artur Holz
- Written by: Paul Beyer; Rolf E. Vanloo
- Produced by: Erich Pommer
- Starring: Conrad Veidt; Lil Dagover; Hermann Böttcher; Bernhard Goetzke
- Cinematography: A.O. Weitzenberg
- Production company: Decla-Bioscop
- Distributed by: Decla-Bioscop
- Release date: 6 January 1921
- Running time: 78 minutes
- Country: Germany
- Languages: Silent; German intertitles

The Secret of Bombay (German: Das Geheimnis von Bombay) is a 1921 German silent adventure film directed by Artur Holz and starring Conrad Veidt, Lil Dagover and Hermann Böttcher. It was shot at the Babelsberg Studios in Berlin. It premiered at the Marmorhaus in Berlin on 6 January 1921.

== Cast ==
- Conrad Veidt as Dichter Tossi
- Lil Dagover as Die Tänzerin Farnese
- Hermann Böttcher as Lord Pombroke
- Bernhard Goetzke as Indischer Abenteurer
- Anton Edthofer as Schiffsarzt Vittorio
- Karl Römer as Teehausbesitzer
- Alfred Abel
- Lewis Brody
- Nien Soen Ling
- Gustav Oberg

== Bibliography ==
- Grange, William. Cultural Chronicle of the Weimar Republic. Scarecrow Press, 2008.
- Hardt, Ursula. From Caligari to California: Erich Pommer's life in the International Film Wars. Berghahn Books, 1996.
