= The Love Story of Cesare Ubaldi =

1922 film

- Directed by: Heinz Schall
- Written by: Max Jungk; Julius Urgiß
- Starring: Johannes Riemann; Margit Barnay; Ferdinand von Alten
- Production company: Koop-Film
- Release date: 30 June 1922
- Country: Germany
- Languages: Silent; German intertitles

The Love Story of Cesare Ubaldi (German: Der Liebesroman des Cesare Ubaldi) is a 1922 German silent film directed by Heinz Schall and starring Johannes Riemann, Margit Barnay, and Ferdinand von Alten.

== Cast ==
- Johannes Riemann
- Margit Barnay
- Ferdinand von Alten
- Ernst Dernburg
- Dora Bergner
- Paula Eberty
- Martin Wolfgang
- Leonhard Haskel
- Paul Rehkopf
- Maria Reisenhofer
- Eugen Rex

== Bibliography ==
- Caneppele, Paolo (2002). Entscheidungen der Tiroler Filmzensur: 1922–1938. Vienna: Film Archiv Austria. ISBN 978-3-901932-12-0.
