= Robert Dinesen =

Danish film director

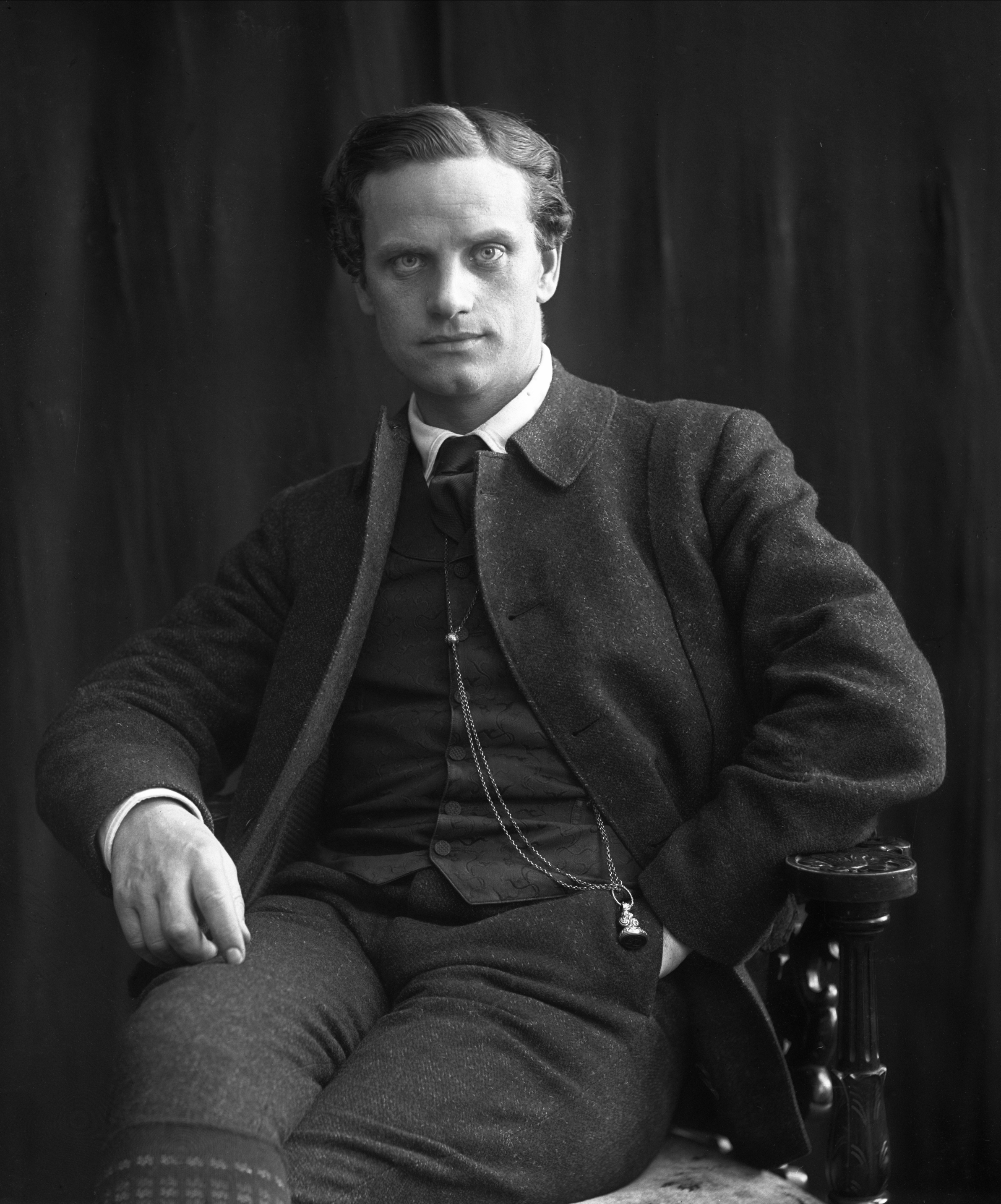
- Robert Dinesen portrait by Gustav Borgen during one of his stays in Kristiania, Norway.
- Born: Robert Theodor Louis Camillo Dinesen; 23 October 1874; Copenhagen, Denmark
- Died: 8 March 1972 (aged 97); West Berlin, West Germany
- Occupations: Actor, Director
- Years active: 1910-1929 (film)

Robert Theodor Camillo Dinesen (23 October 1874 – 8 March 1972) was a Danish film actor and director. He was first married to actress Laura Johanne Winter (1882–1930) and secondly to Christine Marie Christensen (1877–1935). He is buried with his third wife, German actress Margarete Schön, at the Friedhof Heerstraße cemetery in Berlin-Westend.

== Selected filmography ==
- The Abyss (1910)
- Four Devils (1911)
- Dr. X (1915)
- The Secret of the Desert (1918)
- Ilona (1921)
- The Women of Gnadenstein (1921)
- The Passion of Inge Krafft (1921)
- The Inheritance of Tordis (1921)
- Tabitha, Stand Up (1922)
- Tatjana (1923)
- Claire (1924)
- In the Name of the Kaisers (1925)
- If Only It Weren't Love (1925)
- The Fire Dancer (1925)
- Ariadne in Hoppegarten (1928)

== Bibliography ==
- Soister, John T. Conrad Veidt on Screen: A Comprehensive Illustrated Filmography. McFarland, 2002.
