= Margit Barnay =

German actress (1896–1974)

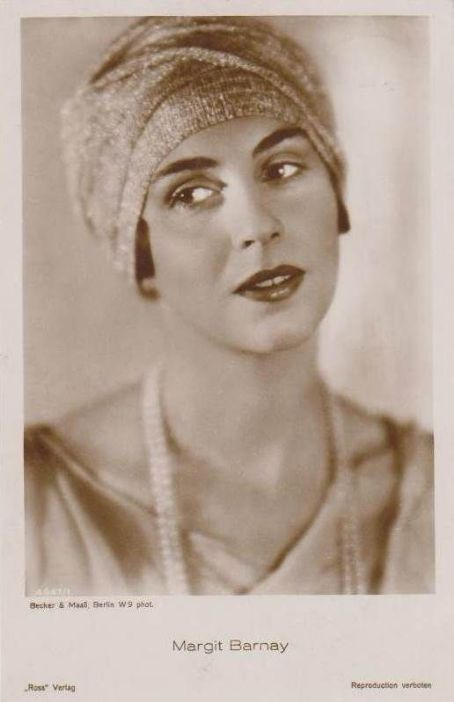
- Born: Margit Jana Rosenstock; 5 April 1896; Berlin, German Empire
- Died: 11 January 1974 (aged 77); Zehlendorf, West Berlin, West Germany
- Occupation: Actress
- Years active: 1919–1927 (film)
- Spouse: Hans Schmidt-Werden
- Children: Sybil Werden

Margit Barnay (born Margit Jana Rosenstock; 5 April 1896 – 11 January 1974) was a German film actress of the silent era.

== Selected filmography ==
- The Boy in Blue (1919)
- Satan (1920)
- From the Files of a Respectable Woman (1920)
- Uriel Acosta (1920)
- The Skull of Pharaoh's Daughter (1920)
- The Stranger from Alster Street (1921)
- The Woman in the Trunk (1921)
- The Experiment of Professor Mithrany (1921)
- The Sleeping Volcano (1922)
- Only One Night (1922)
- The Love Nest (1922)
- The Love Story of Cesare Ubaldi (1922)
- The Tigress (1922)
- Women Who Commit Adultery (1922)
- Bigamy (1922)
- Don Juan (1922)
- The Good Comrade (1923)
- King of Women (1923)
- I Had a Comrade (1923)
- The Beautiful Girl (1923)
- We'll Meet Again in the Heimat (1926)
- Two Under the Stars (1927)
- Benno Stehkragen (1927)

== Bibliography ==
- Soister, John T. (2002). Conrad Veidt on Screen: A Comprehensive Illustrated Filmography. Jefferson, NC: McFarland. ISBN 978-0-7864-1289-1.
