= Max Martersteig =

German actor, theatre director and writer

- Born: 11 February 1853; Weimar, Grand Duchy of Saxe-Weimar-Eisenach
- Died: 3 November 1926 (aged 73); Cologne, Germany
- Occupations: Actor, theatre director, playwright, theatre historian
- Spouse: Gertrud Eysoldt
- Children: Leo Eysoldt

Max Martersteig (11 February 1853 – 3 November 1926) was a German stage actor, theatre director, writer and theatre historian.

== Life and career ==
Born in Weimar, Martersteig began his acting training with Otto Devrient. He made his stage debut in 1873 as Charles VII in The Maid of Orleans. This was followed by engagements in Rostock, Frankfurt an der Oder (1875-1876), Weimar (1876–1879), Mainz (1879-1880), Aachen (1880-1881) and Kassel (1882-1885). In 1885, he became head director and artistic director of the theatre in Mannheim. In 1890, he left Mannheim and went to Riga where he was theatre director until 1896. In 1905, he worked in Cologne and later served as director of the theatre in Leipzig until 1918.

He was also active as a playwright and theatre historian. In 1904, his work The German Theatre in the 19th Century was published, which is considered fundamental.

Martersteig was married to the actress Gertrud Eysoldt, and their son was the conductor and composer Leo Eysoldt.

Martersteig died in Cologne at the age of 73. His gravesite is in Cologne's Melaten Cemetery. The barely legible gravestone features a depiction of a Death Genius and bears a dedicatory inscription.

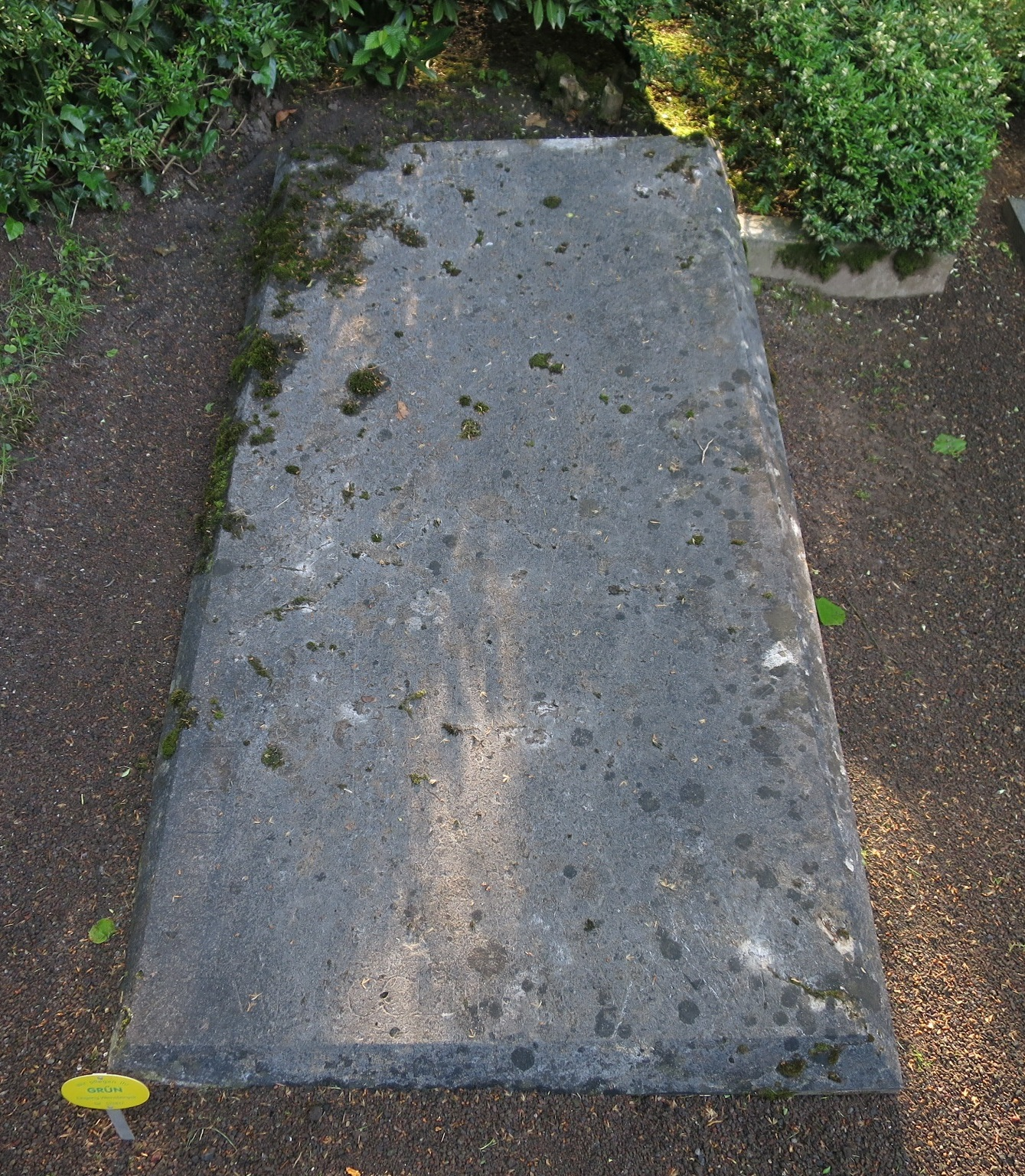
Martersteig's gravesite at the Melaten cemetery

In 1968, Martersteigstraße was named after him in Cologne.

== Works ==
- Im Pavillon 1878
- Jelta u. Ruben 1881
- Aus Hessens Vorzeit 1884
- Der Schauspieler, ein künstlerisches Problem 1893 (new edition 1900)
- Giovanni Segantini. Bard, Marquardt & Co., Berlin 1903
- Das deutsche Theater im neunzehnten Jahrhundert. Eine kulturgeschichtliche Darstellung 1904, 2nd edition 1924
- Das Abendbuch 1927
- Werner von Kuonefalk, A.G. Liebeskind publisher, Leipzig, 1886
