= Paul Rehkopf =

German actor (1872-1949)

- Born: 21 May 1872; Braunschweig, Germany
- Died: 29 June 1949 (aged 77); Berlin, Germany
- Years active: 1917-1948

Paul Anton Heinrich Rehkopf (21 May 1872 – 29 June 1949) was a German actor.

He was born in Braunschweig, Germany and died in Berlin, Germany.

== Selected filmography ==
- Diary of a Lost Woman (1918)
- Film Kathi (1918)
- Lorenzo Burghardt (1918)
- Der Mädchenhirt (1919)
- President Barrada (1920)
- Uriel Acosta (1920)
- The Dancer of Jaipur (1920)
- Four Around a Woman (1921)
- Destiny (1921)
- Night and No Morning (1921)
- The Red Masquerade Ball (1921)
- The Man in the Background (1922)
- The Circle of Death (1922)
- The Sleeping Volcano (1922)
- The Love Story of Cesare Ubaldi (1922)
- Rose of the Asphalt Streets (1922)
- Madame Golvery (1923)
- Tatjana (1923)
- I Had a Comrade (1923)
- His Wife, The Unknown (1923)
- The Secret of the Duchess (1923)
- Horrido (1924)
- Playing with Destiny (1924)
- Man Against Man (1924)
- Varieté (1925)
- A Free People (1925)
- Oh Those Glorious Old Student Days (1925)
- In the Name of the Kaisers (1925)
- The Fallen (1926)
- Lace (1926)
- The Armoured Vault (1926)
- Our Daily Bread (1926)
- White Slave Traffic (1926)
- The Field Marshal (1927)
- Poor Little Colombine (1927)
- The Tragedy of a Lost Soul (1927)
- Out of the Mist (1927)
- The False Prince (1927)
- Spies (1928)
- Under Suspicion (1928)
- The Page Boy at the Golden Lion (1928)
- Mary Lou (1928)
- The Great Adventuress (1928)
- The Convict from Istanbul (1929)
- Beyond the Street (1929)
- Sinful and Sweet (1929)
- The Call of the North (1929)
- What a Woman Dreams of in Springtime (1929)
- Roses Bloom on the Moorland (1929)
- The Caviar Princess (1930)
- Eskimo (1930)
- Him or Me (1930)
- Fire in the Opera House (1930)
- Fairground People (1930)
- The Stolen Face (1930)
- Berlin-Alexanderplatz (1931)
- A Storm Over Zakopane (1931)
- The Captain from Köpenick (1931)
- Night Convoy (1932)
- The White Demon (1932)
- Ship Without a Harbour (1932)
- Scandal on Park Street (1932)
- The Dancer of Sanssouci (1932)
- Haunted People (1932)
- The White God (1932)
- Love Must Be Understood (1933)
- Little Girl, Great Fortune (1933)
- The Peak Scaler (1933)
- Polish Blood (1934)
- The World Without a Mask (1934)
- The Sporck Battalion (1934)
- The Bird Seller (1935)
- The Young Count (1935)
- Artist Love (1935)
- Stradivari (1935)
- When the Cock Crows (1936)
- Martha (1936)
- Winter in the Woods (1936)
- Land of Love (1937)
- The Divine Jetta (1937)
- Serenade (1937)
- Fanny Elssler (1937)
- The Hound of the Baskervilles (1937)
- Secret Code LB 17 (1938)
- The Tiger of Eschnapur (1938)
- Shadows Over St. Pauli (1938)
- The Indian Tomb (1938)
- The Blue Fox (1938)
- Robert Koch (1939)
- We Danced Around the World (1939)
- Wibbel the Tailor (1939)
- Passion (1940)
- Riding for Germany (1941)
- Alarm (1941)
- Rembrandt (1942)
- Melody of a Great City (1943)
- Tonelli (1943)
- When the Young Wine Blossoms (1943)
- The Bath in the Barn (1943)
- A Man With Principles? (1943)
- The Black Robe (1944)
- Love Letters (1944)
- Philharmonic (1944)
- That Was My Life (1944)
- The Court Concert (1948)

== Bibliography ==
- Jung, Uli & Schatzberg, Walter. Beyond Caligari: The Films of Robert Wiene. Berghahn Books, 1999.
