= Midnight Rose (film) =

1928 film

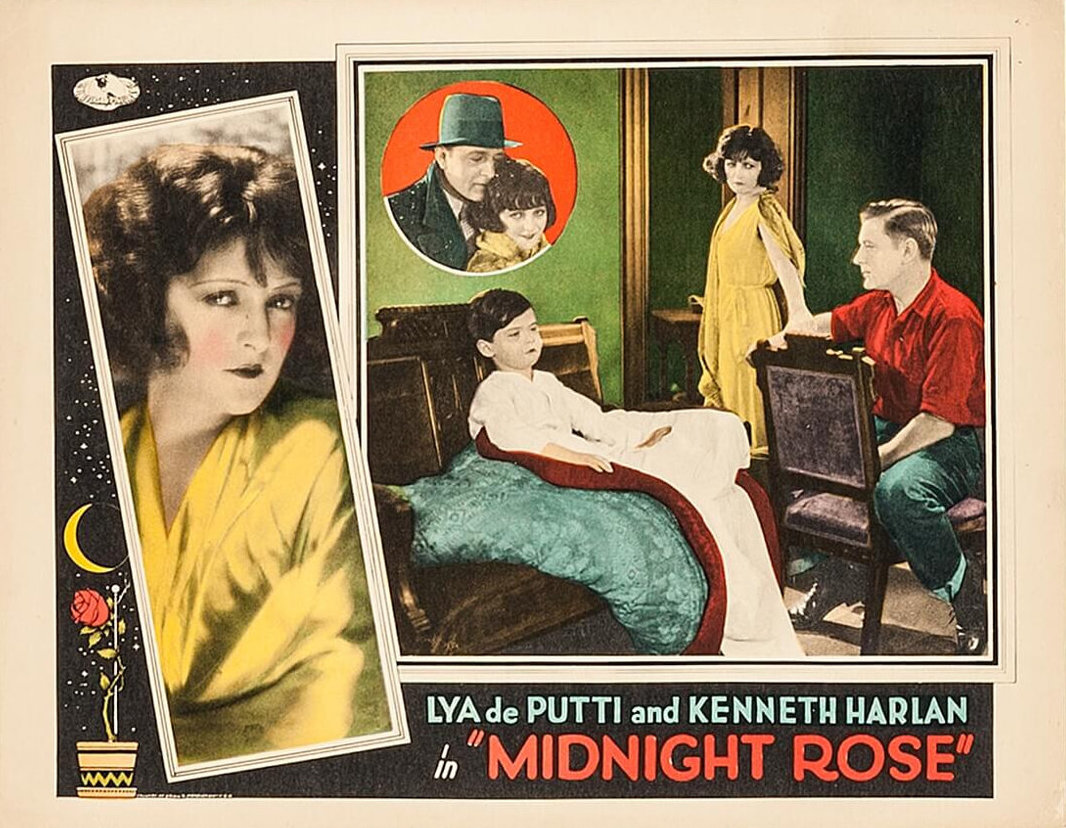
- Lobby card
- Directed by: James Young
- Written by: J. Grubb Alexander; Tom Reed
- Starring: Lya De Putti; Kenneth Harlan; Henry Kolker
- Cinematography: Joseph Brotherton
- Edited by: Byron Robinson
- Production company: Universal Pictures
- Distributed by: Universal Pictures
- Release date: February 26, 1928
- Running time: 60 minutes
- Country: United States
- Language: Silent (English intertitles)

Midnight Rose is a 1928 American silent crime drama film directed by James Young and starring Lya De Putti, Kenneth Harlan, and Henry Kolker.

== Cast ==
- Lya De Putti as Midnight Rose
- Kenneth Harlan as Tim Regan
- Henry Kolker as Corbin
- Lorimer Johnston as English Edwards
- George Larkin as Joe
- Gunboat Smith as Casey
- Wendell Phillips Franklin as Sonny
- Frank Brownlee as Grogan
- Fred Carpenter as Cupid (uncredited)

== Preservation ==
With no prints of Midnight Rose in any film archives, it is a lost film.

== Bibliography ==
- Bock, Hans-Michael & Bergfelder, Tim. The Concise CineGraph. Encyclopedia of German Cinema. Berghahn Books, 2009.
