= Leo Eysoldt =

German conductor, violinist, composer 1892–1958)

- Born: 30 July 1892; Dresden, German Empire
- Died: 17 September 1958 (aged 66); Cologne, West Germany
- Occupations: Conductor, violinist and composer
- Parents: Max Martersteig (father); Gertrud Eysoldt (mother)

Leo Eysoldt (30 July 1892 – 17 September 1958) was a German conductor, violinist and composer. He worked in German radio broadcasting and orchestral music during the first half of the 20th century.

== Life and career ==
Eysoldt was born in Dresden in 1892. He was the son of the actors Gertrud Eysoldt and Max Martersteig. His half-brother was the actor and screenwriter Peter Berneis.

He studied violin, composition and conducting in Dresden and later worked as a répétiteur and conductor at several German theatres.

From the 1920s onward, Eysoldt worked with broadcasting orchestras and radio music production in Germany.

In Cologne he worked with the Westdeutscher Rundfunk at Reichssender Köln, where he conducted the Kleines Orchester for light entertainment music broadcasts. He also directed a 20-member salon orchestra at the Café Germania, regarded as one of the city's leading entertainment orchestras.

Among the musicians associated with these ensembles was the violinist Kurt Schäffer, later founder of the Schäffer Quartet.

Following the Second World War, Eysoldt continued musical activities in Cologne.

== Compositions ==
Eysoldt composed orchestral, chamber and light music works. Some of his compositions were written for radio performance and broadcasting ensembles.

=== Selected compositions ===
- Sunflower (Foxtrot-Intermezzo, 1921)
- Affi (Shimmy-Fox, 1922)
- Laterna magica
- Der alte Leuchtturm bei der großen Mole (1953)
- Fürst Fitzebutze, radio play music after Theo Töller

== Selected recordings ==
Selected recordings conducted or performed by Eysoldt include:

- Über den Wellen / Küsse im Dunkeln (Telefunken, 1934)
- Es waren zwei Königskinder (Telefunken, 1934)
- Zigeuner-Sehnsucht (Telefunken, 1934)
- Geheimnisse der Etsch (Telefunken, 1934)
- Bib et Bob (Telefunken, 1934)
- Laterna magica Marsch (Gloria GO 27198)

== Legacy ==
Eysoldt is documented in German broadcasting archives and music lexicons as part of the musical culture of early German radio.
