= Vojčice =

Vojčice Vécse
- Municipality
- Flag

- Location of Vojčice in the Košice Region Location of Vojčice in Slovakia
- Coordinates: 48.68°N 21.72°E
- Country: Slovakia
- Region: Košice Region
- District: Trebišov District
- First mentioned: 1217

Area
  - Total: 17.89 km^{2} (6.91 sq mi)
- Elevation: 108 m (354 ft)

Population (2025)
  - Total: 2,273
- Time zone: UTC+1 (CET)
  - Summer (DST): UTC+2 (CEST)
- Postal code: 762 2
- Area code: +421 56
- Vehicle registration plate (until 2022): TV
- Website: www.obecvojcice.sk

Vojčice (Slovak pronunciation: [ˈʋɔjtʂitse]; Hungarian: Vécse) is a village and municipality in the Trebišov District in the Košice Region of south-eastern Slovakia.

== History ==
In historical records the village was first mentioned in 1217.

== Geography ==
The municipality lies at an altitude of 108 metres (354 ft) and covers an area of 17.89 km^{2} (6.91 sq mi) (2025).

== Population ==
Population statistic (10 years)
| Year | 1995 | 2005 | 2015 | 2025 |
|---|---|---|---|---|
| Count | 1924 | 2097 | 2164 | 2273 |
| Difference | | +8.99% | +3.19% | +5.03% |

Population statistic
| Year | 2024 | 2025 |
|---|---|---|
| Count | 2253 | 2273 |
| Difference | | +0.88% |

It has a population of 2273 people (31 December 2025).

=== Ethnicity ===
Census 2021 (1+ %)
| Ethnicity | Number | Fraction |
|---|---|---|
| Slovak | 2056 | 96.11% |
| Romani | 140 | 6.54% |
| Not found out | 30 | 1.4% |
| Total | 2139 | |

In year 2021 was 2139 people by ethnicity 2056 as Slovak, 140 as Romani, 30 as Not found out, 16 as Czech, 12 as Hungarian, 7 as Ukrainian, 5 as Rusyn, 5 as Other, 4 as Russian, 1 as Irish, 1 as Serbian, 1 as Polish, 1 as German, 1 as Canadian, 1 as French and 1 as English.

Note on population: The difference values of population numbers in the table "Population statistic" and in the sections "Ethnicity" & "Religion" is caused by the use of various statistical methods.

=== Religion ===
Census 2021 (1+ %)
| Religion | Number | Fraction |
|---|---|---|
| Roman Catholic Church | 877 | 41% |
| Greek Catholic Church | 789 | 36.89% |
| None | 181 | 8.46% |
| Not found out | 137 | 6.4% |
| Calvinist Church | 70 | 3.27% |
| Evangelical Church | 30 | 1.4% |
| Eastern Orthodox Church | 27 | 1.26% |
| Total | 2139 | |

In year 2021 was 2139 people by religion 877 from Roman Catholic Church, 789 from Greek Catholic Church, 181 from None, 137 from Not found out, 70 from Calvinist Church, 30 from Evangelical Church, 27 from Eastern Orthodox Church, 13 from Jehovah's Witnesses, 8 from Christian Congregations in Slovakia, 6 from Other and not ascertained christian church and 1 from United Methodist Church.

== Facilities ==
The village has a public library a gym and a football pitch. It also has a cinema.

== Notable natives ==
- Lya De Putti, film actress
