= Hans Mierendorff =

German stage and film actor (1882–1955)

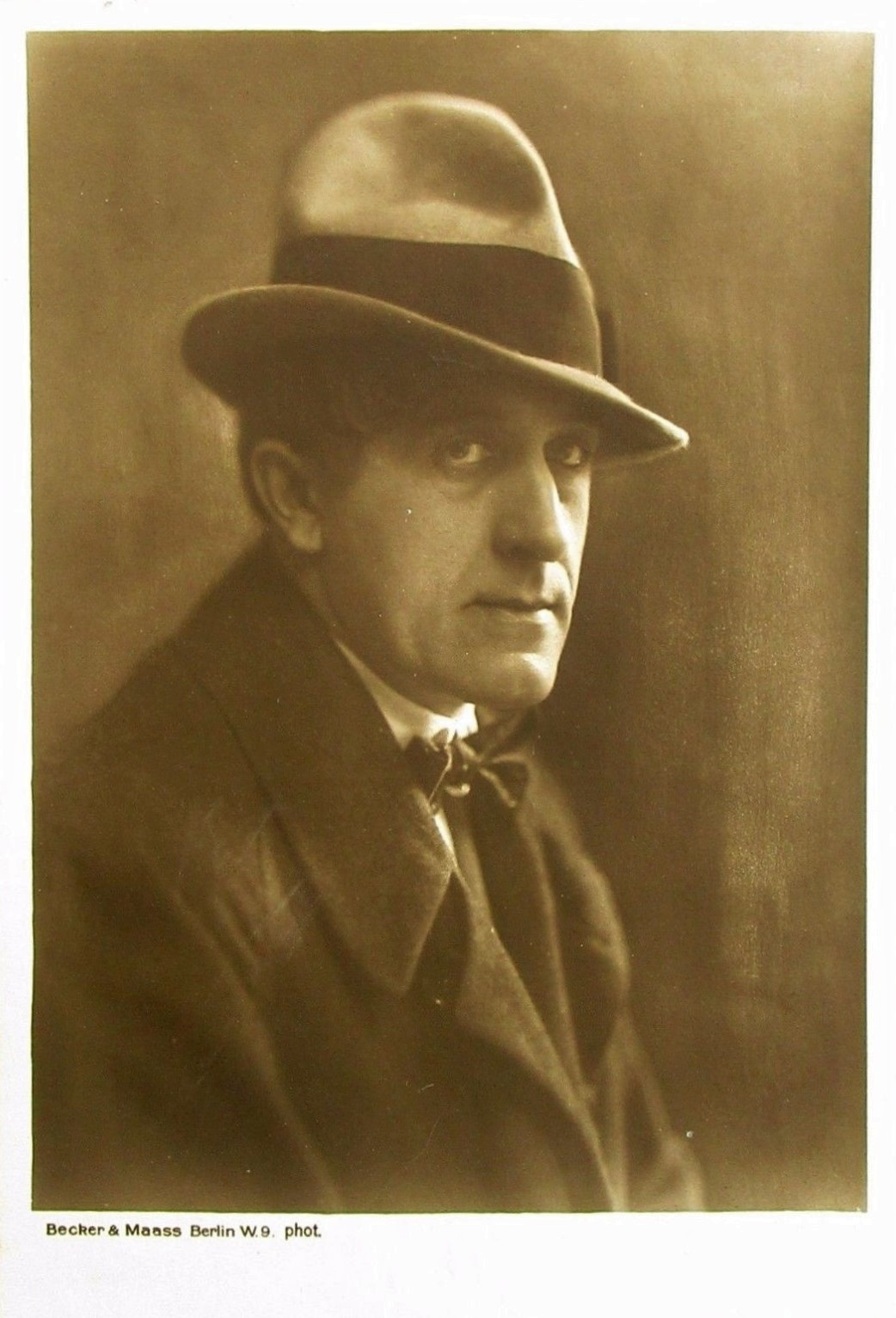
- Mierendorff, c. 1920
- Born: Johannes Reingold Mierendorff; 30 June 1882; Rostock, German Empire
- Died: 26 December 1955 (aged 73); Eutin, West Germany
- Occupation: Actor
- Years active: 1916–1942

Hans Mierendorff (born Johannes Reingold Mierendorff; 30 June 1882 – 26 December 1955) was a German stage and film actor.

== Selected filmography ==
- A Night of Horror (1916)
- Vengeance Is Mine (1916)
- Hilde Warren und der Tod (1917)
- The Sacrifice (1918)
- The Mistress of the World (1919)
- Whitechapel (1920)
- Hearts are Trumps (1920)
- The White Peacock (1920)
- Night and No Morning (1921)
- The Conspiracy in Genoa (1921)
- Children of Darkness (1921)
- The Sleeping Volcano (1922)
- The Black Star (1922)
- Man Against Man (1924)
- Girls You Don't Marry (1924)
- The Enchantress (1924)
- Debit and Credit (1924)
- The Second Mother (1925)
- The Motorist Bride (1925)
- Old Mamsell's Secret (1925)
- Hussar Fever (1925)
- Cock of the Roost (1925)
- Oh Those Glorious Old Student Days (1925)
- The Man Who Sold Himself (1925)
- The Dealer from Amsterdam (1925)
- The Humble Man and the Chanteuse (1925)
- State Attorney Jordan (1926)
- The Circus of Life (1926)
- Watch on the Rhine (1926)
- Love's Joys and Woes (1926)
- Wrath of the Seas (1926)
- Our Daily Bread (1926)
- The Good Reputation (1926)
- Bigamie (1927)
- Attorney for the Heart (1927)
- Benno Stehkragen (1927)
- Circle of Lovers (1927)
- U-9 Weddigen (1927)
- Eva and the Grasshopper (1927)
- The Dashing Archduke (1927)
- Queen Louise (1927–28)
- The False Prince (1927)
- Cry for Help (1928)
- Mary Lou (1928)
- The Criminal of the Century (1928)
- Endangered Girls (1928)
- The Sinner (1928)
- The Market of Life (1928)
- It's You I Have Loved (1929)
- The Virgin of Paris (1930)
- Marriage in Name Only (1930)
- The Caviar Princess (1930)
- The Land of Smiles (1930)
- Namensheirat (1930)
- The Dancer of Sanssouci (1932)
- The Higher Command (1935)
- The Valiant Navigator (1935)
- A Doctor of Conviction (1936)
- Napoleon Is to Blame for Everything (1938)
- The Holm Murder Case (1938)
- Rubber (1938)
- Water for Canitoga (1939)
- The Sensational Casilla Trial (1939)
- The Fox of Glenarvon (1940)
- Carl Peters (1941)
- Weiße Wäsche (1942)
- The Big Shadow (1942)
- A Flea in Her Ear (1943)

== Bibliography ==
- Kreimeier, Klaus. The Ufa story: a history of Germany's greatest film company, 1918-1945. University of California Press, 1999.
- St. Pierre, Paul Matthew. E.A. Dupont and his Contribution to British Film: Varieté, Moulin Rouge, Piccadilly, Atlantic, Two Worlds, Cape Forlorn. Fairleigh Dickinson University Press, 2010.
