= Gertrud Eysoldt =

German stage and film actress

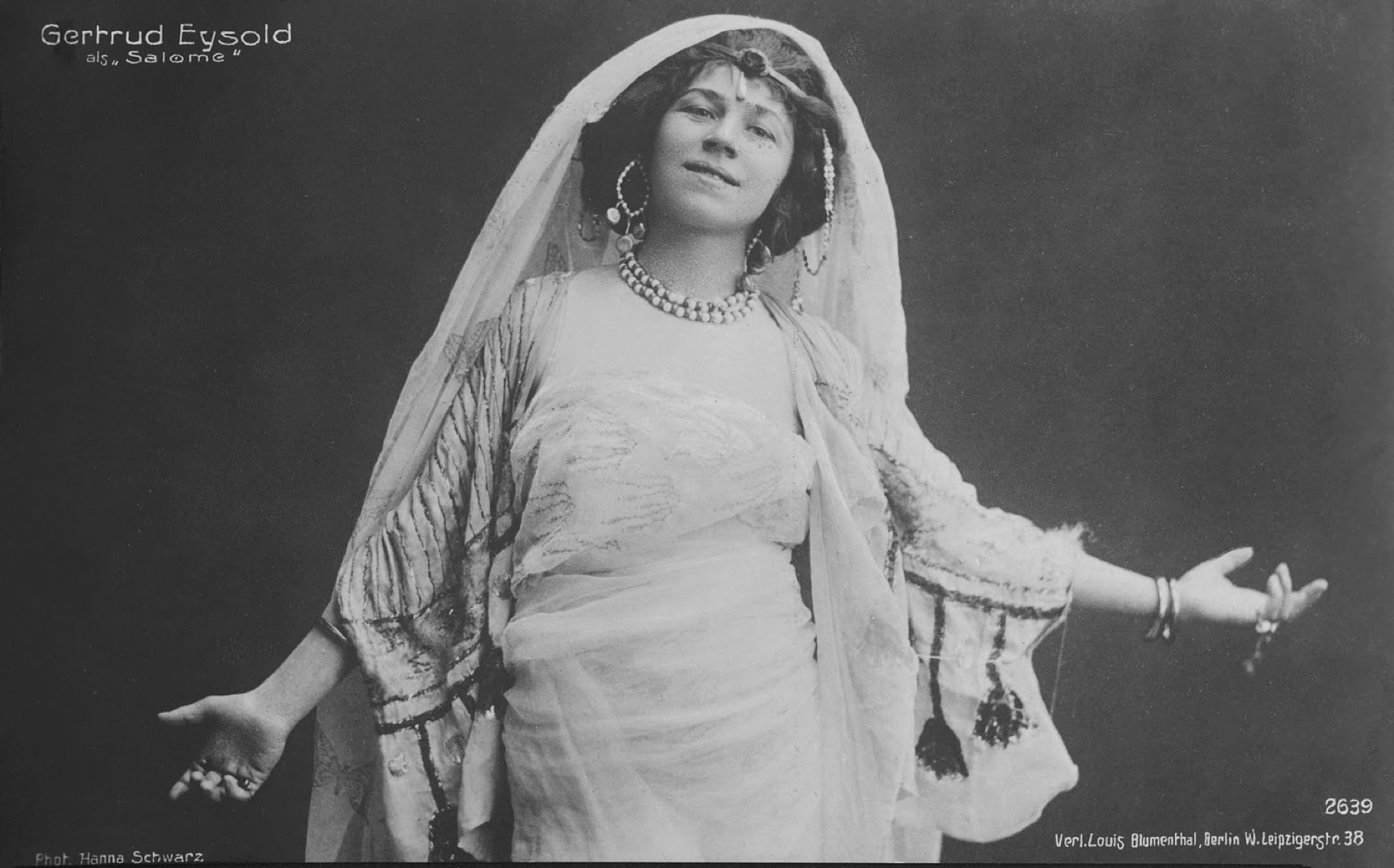
- Eysoldt as Salome, 1903
- Born: 30 November 1870; Pirna, Kingdom of Saxony
- Died: 6 January 1955 (aged 84); Ohlstadt, West Germany
- Occupation: Actress
- Years active: 1890–1949

Gertrud Franziska Gabriele Eysoldt (30 November 1870 – 6 January 1955) was a German film and stage actress of the late 19th and early 20th centuries. She was regarded as one of the leading German actresses of her era. The Gertrud-Eysoldt-Ring, awarded annually for outstanding theatrical performances, is named in her honour.

== Life and career ==
Eysoldt was born in Pirna as the daughter of the Reichstag deputy Arthur Eysoldt and his wife Bertha Wilhelmine Richter.

She studied at the Royal Music School in Munich between 1888 and 1889 before joining the Munich Court Theatre as a trainee actress. She later worked at the court theatre in Meiningen, where she was supported by Georg II, Duke of Saxe-Meiningen and his wife.

During a guest performance tour she came to Riga in 1891 and subsequently joined the city theatre there. The theatre director was the actor and writer Max Martersteig, whom she later married.

Their son was the conductor and composer Leo Eysoldt.

In 1915 she married the painter Benno Berneis. Their son Peter Berneis later worked as an actor and screenwriter.

== Stage career ==
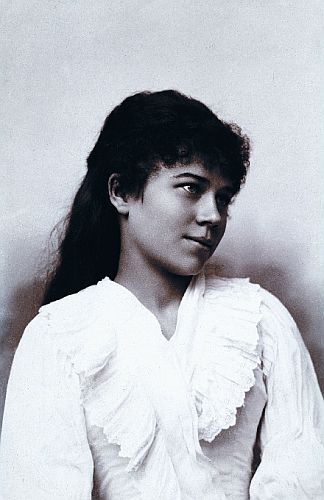
Actress Gertrud Eysoldt from Pirna, 1898

Gertrud Eysoldt first appeared in Henry IV in 1890 with the influential Meiningen Ensemble. After touring in Germany and Russia she performed in Berlin in 1899 and later played under the direction of Max Reinhardt. She specialized in modern realistic parts, particularly in the works of Frank Wedekind, opposite the author, as well the plays of Henrik Ibsen and Maeterlinck. In 1921 she was in the first German-language production of Schnitzler's controversial play Reigen at the Kleines Schauspielhaus in Berlin.

In 1903, Eysoldt garnered widespread praise for her mesmerising physical performances and her groundbreaking portrayal of some of the most controversial female characters in modern German theatre. One critic declared that as the title role in Hugo von Hofmannsthal's play Elektra, she "created a new type of acting art and also a new image of women on stage." Eysoldt caused a sensation in her role as Salome in Oscar Wilde's play of the same name. A critic stated she perfectly captured “the pathological persistence of a spoiled child . . . as well as the perverse, erotic, and vengeful lust of a scornful woman.” She also starred in Strindberg's Rausch, Ibsen’s A Doll’s House, and Gorky's The Lower Depths. In reviewing these roles, theater critic Marie Luise Becker wrote:

Gertrud Eysoldt is best suited for the roles of women of modern decadence. Those who scatter around them that secret, wildly sensual and unspeakable bliss and a nameless debauchery. These female figures, the demons and witches of our time—this will turned woman, which modern man seems to fear—are the heroines of the young dramatists. Earth-spirits, abhorred by the bourgeoisie just as they were burned centuries ago, rise up before the poet out of the fog and haze. Gertrud Eysoldt makes them human.

— S.E. Jackson, The Problem of the Actress in Modern German Theater and Thought (2021)

== Film career ==
Eysoldt appeared in more than fifteen films from 1923 to 1949, including:

- The Lost Shoe (1923)
- I Had a Comrade (1924)
- The Transformation of Dr. Bessel (1927)
- The Lady with the Mask (1928)
- Hotel of Secrets (1929)
- Riding for Germany (1949)
