= Leonhard Haskel =

German actor and drama teacher

Leonhard Haskel (7 April 1872 – 30 December 1923) was a German stage and film actor and drama teacher.

Haskel was born in Seelow, in the Prussian Province of Brandenburg, and died in Berlin.

== Selected filmography ==
- Europe, General Delivery (1918)
- One or the Other (1919)
- The Boy in Blue (1919)
- The Secret of the American Docks (1919)
- The Gambler (1919)
- Judith Trachtenberg (1920)
- Uriel Acosta (1920)
- Hearts are Trumps (1920)
- Catherine the Great (1920)
- The Girl from Acker Street (1920)
- Playing with Fire (1921)
- The Black Panther (1921)
- Wandering Souls (1921)
- Four Around a Woman (1921)
- The Story of a Maid (1921)
- Impostor (1921)
- Marizza (1922)
- The Love Story of Cesare Ubaldi (1922)
- The Big Shot (1922)
- Prashna's Secret (1922)
- The Flight into Marriage (1922)
- Bigamy (1922)
- Barmaid (1922)
- Lola Montez, the King's Dancer (1922)
- The Street (1923)
- The Lost Shoe (1923)
- The Chain Clinks (1923)
- The Hungarian Princess (1923)
- La Boheme (1923)
- Explosion (1923)
- Resurrection (1923)
- Leap Into Life (1924)
- The Four Marriages of Matthias Merenus (1924)
- The Game of Love (1924)

== Bibliography ==
- Jung, Uli & Schatzberg, Walter. Beyond Caligari: The Films of Robert Wiene. Berghahn Books, 1999.
