= The Street (1923 film) =

1923 film directed by Karl Grune

- Directed by: Karl Grune
- Written by: Karl Grune; Julius Urgiß
- Produced by: Karl Grune
- Starring: Eugen Klöpfer; Aud Egede-Nissen; Max Schreck
- Cinematography: Karl Hasselmann
- Production company: Stern-Film
- Distributed by: UFA
- Release date: 29 November 1923
- Running time: 95 minutes
- Country: Germany
- Languages: Silent film; German intertitles

The Street (German: Die Straße) is a 1923 German silent drama film directed by Karl Grune and starring Anton Edthofer, Aud Egede-Nissen, and Leonhard Haskel.

The film's sets were designed by the art director Karl Görge.

== Cast ==
- Eugen Klöpfer as a middle-aged man
- Lucie Höflich as the wife of the middle-aged man
- Anton Edthofer as a pimp
- Aud Egede-Nissen as a harlot
- Max Schreck as a blind man
- Leonhard Haskel as a gentleman from the provinces
- Sascha, the child
- Hans Trautner as a fellow

== Synopsis ==
This was the first of the German "street" films. Prints of the film do exist, distributed by Transit Film GmbH for commercial screenings, despite claims to the contrary. There are few intertitles throughout the film, adding to the predominantly visual story-telling approach.

It tells the story of one night in which a middle-aged man is lured away from his happy home into the thrills and dangers of the city streets. The city is an expressionistic nightmare, a dangerous and chaotic place. The unfortunate man encounters thieves, prostitutes, and other predators; two other stories happen in as well involving a country bumpkin joining in on a game of cards and a child of a pimp looking for their father after being left with an old blind man. But the real threat to security and order is the street itself. In an early scene, the man sees a pretty girl and the face turns into a skull. In another scene, the bumbling man passes an optometrist's shop on a crooked, deserted street. The moment his back is turned, an enormous neon sign of a pair of eyeglasses, blinks on. He is soon hooked into playing cards with a prostitute and her company, and he ends up tied in a murder case when he is caught near the scene of a death of the bumpkin, narrowly escaping staying in jail. Afterwards, he goes home to his wife as the sun rises, resting his head on her shoulder.

== Plot ==
The movie follows two distinct plot lines until the two eventually merge: the first is that of the bored middle-aged man seeking a departure from monotony in his life; the second is that of the blind man and the little boy, his grandson, who are interdependent. None of the characters have been given names and are therefore referred to only by description.

The film opens with a middle-aged man lying on his couch with a look of discontent as his wife finishes cooking their dinner on a rather uneventful night. As she rushes back and forth setting the table, he sluggishly rises and walks across the room to the window and gazes out onto the busy streets. His wife eventually walks over and gazes too, but quickly sits at the table and begins to eat dinner. The man takes one look at the food and then casually leaves the apartment and begins to wander the streets in search of something exciting.

The scene switches to a man sitting in a chair holding a little boy about four or five years old. Another, younger-looking man enters the room through a door on the left of the screen towards another door on the right of the screen. The little boy jumps from the man's arms to the younger man, and the older man reaches out for him; it is here that we see that the older man is blind. The little boy runs to the younger man and grasps his leg, saying, "Daddy!" He looks at him briefly, then makes a hasty exit. The little boy begins to cry and the blind man sits him up on his lap and comforts him, stroking his hair and talking to him. Then the little boy helps the blind man put on his coat and hat to go out.

Max Schreck as the blind man. The little boy helps him get dressed to go out.

The middle-aged man eventually encounters a pimp and a harlot. The middle-aged man, the harlot, and the pimp run all around town getting into all sorts of scenarios: scuffling over a seat on a park bench, falsely claiming to have been robbed, going to a dance, and gambling in a card game. They all end up at a party and are seen eating at a table all together. The middle-aged man looks at his wedding ring, and inside of it he sees an image of his wife walking backwards away from him. He begins to miss her and his regular life.

Around the same time, the blind man and the little boy have left the house and are standing outside a shop along the busy street. The blind man is holding the little boy's hand, but he is distracted by a dog and breaks his grip to chase the dog. The blind man is startled and calls out for him in a slight panic. The little boy is stranded on a traffic island in the chaotic, bustling street, surrounded by horses, bicycles, pedestrians, and cars whizzing by. A police officer stops the traffic and walks the little boy across the street into the police station. Meanwhile, the blind man is sliding along a wall, looking desperately for the little boy. He mistakenly steps too far into the street and falls down onto the sidewalk after being nearly run over by a car. He pants heavily, upset and disoriented. A passing pedestrian stops and helps the blind man up and offers to help him get home. The police take the little boy home and put him to bed. Later, the blind man arrives home and sighs in relief at finding the little boy safe at home.

The harlot takes one of the men home and when another man sees him in the house, the other man is murdered. Unbeknownst to both parties, both the middle-aged man's group and the blind man's group are in the same house. The little boy wakes up and hears his father's voice and runs out to him. He again leaves in a haste, but this time the little boy follows him. The blind man wakes up hearing the little boy's cries and stumbles upon the murdered man. He is visibly frightened and breathes heavily. A policeman finds the little boy and brings him home again and the murder scene is discovered. The blind man comforts the little boy as the police take in suspects.

The middle-aged man is imprisoned, after being surprised by the murder scene. He is about to commit suicide by hanging himself from the window with his tie, when the little boy reveals that it was his father who committed the crime. A policeman enters and allows the middle-aged man to go. He returns to his home and leans upon the shoulder of his wife, defeated. She reheats the soup from the night before and normal domesticity returns.

== Reception ==
In a list of the 100 most important German films, compiled in 1994 by the Association of German Cinémathèques, The Street was placed at #75.

== Bibliography ==
- Kapczynski, Jennifer M.; Richardson, Michael D., eds. (2014) [2012]. A New History of German Cinema. New York: Boydell & Brewer. ISBN 978-1-58046-854-1.
- Kreimeier, Klaus (1999). The Ufa Story: A History of Germany's Greatest Film Company, 1918–1945. Berkeley: University of California Press. ISBN 978-0-520-22069-0.
