= Benno Stehkragen =

1927 film

- Directed by: Trude Santen
- Written by: Karl Ettlinger (novel); Robert Stahl
- Starring: Margit Barnay; Bruno Arno; Käthe Haack
- Cinematography: Willy Großstück
- Production company: Biograph-Film
- Release date: 25 November 1927
- Country: Germany
- Languages: Silent; German intertitles

Benno Stehkragen is a 1927 German silent film directed by Trude Santen and starring Margit Barnay, Bruno Arno and Käthe Haack.

The film's sets were designed by the art director Botho Hoefer.

== Cast ==
- Margit Barnay
- Bruno Arno
- Käthe Haack
- Paul Otto
- Kurt Gerron
- Olga Engl
- Karl Harbacher
- Hans Mierendorff
- Gerhard Ritterband
- Walter von Allwoerden
- Ferdinand von Alten

== Bibliography ==
- Bock, Hans-Michael; Bergfelder, Tim, eds. (2009). The Concise Cinegraph: Encyclopaedia of German Cinema. New York: Berghahn Books. ISBN 978-1-57181-655-9.
