= Jealousy (1925 film) =

1925 film directed by Karl Grune

- Directed by: Karl Grune
- Written by: Paul Czinner
- Produced by: Erich Pommer
- Starring: Lya De Putti; Werner Krauss; Georg Alexander; Angelo Ferrari
- Cinematography: Karl Hasselmann
- Music by: Eduard Prasch
- Production company: Stern-Film
- Distributed by: UFA
- Release date: 17 September 1925
- Country: Germany
- Languages: Silent; German intertitles

Jealousy (German: Eifersucht), also known as Varieté, is a 1925 German silent comedy drama film directed by Karl Grune and starring Lya De Putti, Werner Krauss and Georg Alexander.

In 1926 Lya De Putti went to the United States and became a star there. Due to her popularity, a sound version of Jealousy was prepared in 1928 for exhibition in the United States. While the sound version had no audible dialog, it was released with a synchronized musical score with sound effects using both the sound-on-disc and sound-on-film process.

== Cast ==
- Lya De Putti as Frau (Marthe Ménard)
- Werner Krauss as Mann (Georges Ménard)
- Georg Alexander as Freund (Pierre de Ronceray)
- Angelo Ferrari
- Mary Kid

== Music ==
The sound version featured a theme song entitled “Jealousy” by Charles Weinberg, Al Kopopell and Billy Stone.
