= Uriel Acosta (film) =

1920 film

- Directed by: Ernst Wendt
- Written by: Max Jungk; Julius Urgiss
- Based on: Uriel Acosta by Karl Gutzkow
- Produced by: Bruno Decarli
- Starring: Bruno Decarli; Margit Barnay; Leonhard Haskel
- Cinematography: Carl Hoffmann
- Production company: Decarli Film
- Release date: 22 April 1920
- Country: Germany
- Languages: Silent; German intertitles

Uriel Acosta is a 1920 German silent historical drama film directed by Ernst Wendt and starring Bruno Decarli, Margit Barnay and Leonhard Haskel. The film's sets were designed by the art director Heinrich Richter. It is an adaptation of the 1847 play of the same title by Karl Gutzkow inspired by the life of Uriel da Costa.

== Cast ==
- Bruno Decarli as Uriel Acosta
- Margit Barnay as Judith
- Leonhard Haskel as De Silva
- Adolf Klein as Banderstraaten
- Josef Rehberger as Ben Jochai
- Frida Richard as Blinde Mutter
- Erwin Biswanger
- Paul Rehkopf
- Hans Fischer
- Frieda Lehndorf
- Walter Norbert
- Hermann Schmelz
- Erra Sylf
- Toni Zimmerer

== Bibliography ==
- Bock, Hans-Michael & Bergfelder, Tim. The Concise CineGraph. Encyclopedia of German Cinema. Berghahn Books, 2009.
- Estermann, Alfred. Die Verfilmung literarischer Werke. Bouvier, 1965.
