= Four Around a Woman =

1921 film directed by Fritz Lang

Four Around the Woman
- German: Vier um die Frau
- Directed by: Fritz Lang
- Written by: Rolf E. Vanloo (play); Thea von Harbou; Fritz Lang
- Produced by: Erich Pommer
- Starring: Hermann Böttcher; Carola Toelle; Lilli Lohrer
- Cinematography: Otto Kanturek
- Production company: Decla-Bioscop
- Distributed by: Decla-Bioscop
- Release date: 3 February 1921
- Running time: 84 minutes
- Country: Germany
- Languages: Silent; German intertitles

Four Around a Woman (1921) by Fritz Lang

Four Around the Woman (German: Vier um die Frau) is a 1921 German silent drama film directed by Fritz Lang and starring Hermann Böttcher, Carola Toelle and Lilli Lohrer. It is also known by the alternative title of Kämpfende Herzen.

The film's sets were designed by the art director Hans Jacoby. It was shot at the Babelsberg Studios. The film premiered at the Marmorhaus in Berlin in February 1921.

== Plot ==
Harry Yquem is a wealthy realtor. He disguises himself in order to purchase a piece of jewelry for his wife Florence (Carola Toelle) in a criminal cellar from the fence Upton (Rudolf Klein-Rogge) with counterfeit notes. He meets a man in whom he thinks he recognizes a former lover of Florence from before their marriage: it is Werner Krafft who has returned to the city after years and is looking for his former lover Florence. Since he is penniless, he seeks out his twin brother William Krafft to ask him for money. But William has become a bon vivant and a deceiver.

Yquem thinks William is Werner and therefore has him shadowed by his confidant Meunier. Finally he passes him a bogus message that Florence allegedly wants to see him and offers him a rendez-vous, whereupon William drives to the Yquem household. Yquem follows him armed, hoping to catch him and his wife. At the same time, however, Meunier approaches Florence on his own initiative and with clear intentions, who is visibly confused.

Werner Krafft has tried in vain to find his brother William. When Werner returns to Upton's basement, he overhears him and his assistant. They have discovered Yquem's fraud with the wrong money and want to kidnap Florence in order to extort the amount owed from Yquem.

Upton and his friend drive to the Yquems estate, Werner Krafft pursues them. The Yquems have a showdown with shootings and a large police presence, in which all secrets are revealed.

== Cast ==
- Hermann Böttcher as Florence's father
- Carola Toelle as Florence Yquem
- Lilli Lohrer as Florence's maid
- Ludwig Hartau as Harry Yquem, a broker
- Anton Edthofer as Werner Krafft and as his twin brother William Krafft
- Robert Forster-Larrinaga as Meunier
- Lisa von Marton as Margot
- Gottfried Huppertz as the head chef
- Rudolf Klein-Rogge as Upton, a jewel fence
- Harry Frank as Bobby
- Paul Morgan as the other jewel fence
- Gerhard Ritterband as the newspaper boy
- Hans Lipschütz as the rascal
- Erika Unruh as the whore
- Edgar Pauly as the inconspicuous gentleman
- Leonhard Haskel as crook #1
- Paul Rehkopf as crook #2

== Restoration ==
Long regarded as lost, a film reel in Portuguese was found in 1986 in the Cinemateca Brasileira in São Paulo by the film historian Walther Seidler, an employee of the Kinemathek in Berlin, together with Lang's The Wandering Image, from the estate of a local distributor. After two years of restoration work, it was shown again in 1988 at the Berlinale. The reconstructed copy is 1,618 meters long. The intertitles have been translated back from Portuguese.
