= Countess Donelli =

1924 film

- Friedrich Kayßler, Ferdinand von Alten and Henny Porten
- Directed by: G. W. Pabst
- Written by: Hans Kyser
- Produced by: Paul Ebner; Maxim Galitzenstein
- Starring: Paul Hansen; Henny Porten; Ferdinand von Alten
- Cinematography: Guido Seeber
- Production company: Maxim Film
- Distributed by: Sud Film
- Release date: 7 November 1924
- Running time: 87 minutes
- Country: Weimar Republic
- Languages: Silent; German intertitles

Countess Donelli (German: Gräfin Donelli) is a 1924 German silent drama film directed by G. W. Pabst and starring Paul Hansen, Henny Porten and Ferdinand von Alten. The film is considered to be lost. The film's sets were designed by the art director Hermann Warm.

== Cast ==
- Paul Hansen as Graf Donelli
- Henny Porten as Mathilde, seine Frau
- Friedrich Kayßler as Graf Bergheim
- Eberhard Leithoff as Hellwig, Privatsekretär
- Ferdinand von Alten as Baron von Trachwitz
- Lantelme Dürer
- Karl Etlinger

== See also ==
- List of lost films
