= Paul Hansen (tenor) =

Danish opera singer and actor

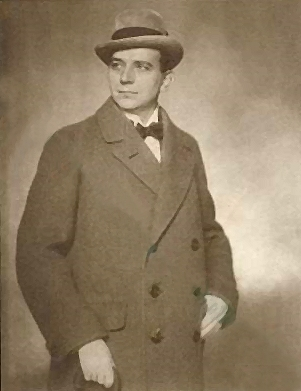
- Hansen circa 1930
- Born: 3 April 1886; Copenhagen, Denmark
- Died: 11 November 1967 (aged 81); Helsinki, Finland
- Occupations: Opera singer (tenor, baritone); Movie star

Paul Hansen (3 April 1886 – 11 November 1967) was a Danish opera singer and actor. Hansen started his opera career as a tenor but later increased his range to take on baritone roles. In 1917 Hansen, now working in Berlin, branched into silent movies and in 1919 took on the romantic lead in The Mistress of the World.

== Opera career ==
Hansen's initial occupation was as a copper-engraver but he harboured desires to become an opera singer. He studied in Copenhagen at the Royal Chamber under the tutelage of baritone Albert Hoeberg (1879–1949) and the tenor Hermann Spiro. Hansen made his operatic stage debut in Copenhagen at the Royal Danish Theatre in 1908 as a tenor, when he appeared as Sverkel in the romantic opera Liden Kirsten. He later travelled to Berlin, where he studied under both Louise Reuss-Belce and Lilli Lehmann. He extended his vocal range during his time in Berlin and by 1919 he was able to take on both tenor and baritone roles.

During his career he mastered 150 roles using both singer ranges, but tended to prefer operettas. As a young tenor he was popular in heroic leads and appeared in several classical Wagner interpretations, including the title roles in Lohengrin, Tannhäuser and Parsifal and as Walther von Stolzing in Die Meistersinger von Nürnberg. Hansen also performed the roles of Don José in Bizet's Carmen and the hunter Konrad in the romantic opera Hans Heiling by Heinrich Marschner. As a baritone he took on the title character in Verdi's Rigoletto.

In 1925, with his film career behind him, Hansen took on the role as Director of the State Theatre of Thuringia, based in Gera. He held the role until 1930, rarely appearing on stage after this period. When his singing career ended, he returned to Copenhagen where he became a music teacher. He later moved to Helsinki where he died in 1967 at the age of 81.

== Film career ==
In 1917 Hansen appeared in his film debut, Cavalleria Rusticana, based on the opera of the same name. His co-star on Cavalleria Rusticana was mezzo-soprano Emma Vilmar, who took the role of Lucia. The two became a couple and were later married. His early cinema appearances were all made in Germany and were translations of popular operas. From 1919 Hansen began appearing in cinema dramas, and that year he starred in the silent film The Woman at the Crossroads, directed by Georg Jacoby. The next year he was chosen to appear as the American love interest to Mia May's heroine in the latter episodes of the eight part epic The Mistress of the World (Die Herrin der Welt). In 1922, Hansen returned to filmic opera, with an interpretation of Rudolf Lothar's libretto Tiefland. Hansen's final film was Gräfin Donelli (English: Countess Donelli) in 1924, in which he performed the male lead alongside Henny Porten.

=== Partial filmography ===
- Cavalleria Rusticana (1917)
- Der Freischütz (1918)
- Weisses Gold (1918)
- The Woman at the Crossroads (1919)
- Wenn ein Mädchen hübsch ist (1919)
- Die Herrin der Welt, Parts V-VII (1920)
- Zigeunerblut (Gypsy Blood) (1920)
- Der Spielmann (1921)
- Junge Mama (1921)
- Die Jagd nach dem Tode (1921)
- Das Geheimnis der sieben Ringe (1922)
- Lucifer short (1922)
- Die Dame in Grau (1922)
- Die Flibustier (1922)
- Tania, the Woman in Chains (1922)
- Tiefland (Lowlands) (1922)
- Inge Larsen (1923)
- Countess Donelli (1924)
