= The Man of Action =

- German: Der Mann der Tat
- Directed by: Victor Janson
- Written by: Robert Wiene
- Produced by: Paul Davidson
- Starring: Emil Jannings; Hanna Ralph; Hermann Böttcher
- Cinematography: Frederik Fuglsang
- Production company: PAGU
- Distributed by: UFA
- Release date: February 1919
- Country: Germany
- Languages: Silent; German intertitles

The Man of Action (German: Der Mann der Tat) is a 1919 German silent film directed by Victor Janson and starring Emil Jannings, Hanna Ralph and Hermann Böttcher.

The film's sets were designed by the art director Kurt Richter.

== Cast ==
- Emil Jannings as Jan Miller
- Hanna Ralph as Henrica van Looy
- Hermann Böttcher
