= Oh Those Glorious Old Student Days (1925 film) =

1925 German silent film

- Carl Beckersachs, Walter Slezak, Charles Willy Kayser
- Directed by: Helene Lackner; Eugen Rex; Heinz Schall
- Written by: Helene Lackner; Eugen Rex
- Produced by: Artur Kiekebusch-Brenken
- Starring: Eugen Klöpfer; Maria Zelenka; Hans Mierendorff
- Cinematography: Otto Kanturek
- Production company: Koop-Film
- Release date: 29 September 1925
- Country: Germany
- Languages: Silent; German intertitles

Oh Those Glorious Old Student Days (German: O alte Burschenherrlichkeit) is a 1925 German silent film directed by Eugen Rex and Heinz Schall and starring Eugen Klöpfer, Maria Zelenka, and Hans Mierendorff.

The film's sets were designed by the art director Karl Machus.

The film's German title is also the opening line and common title of the German student song "O alte Burschenherrlichkeit". The song text first appeared anonymously as "Rückblicke eines alten Burschen" in Der Freimüthige on 9 August 1825.

== Premise ==
The film is a drama set in a student milieu and concerns a romantic relationship across differences in social class. It also makes explicit use of traditional songs associated with the Rhineland.

== Cast ==
- Eugen Klöpfer
- Maria Zelenka
- Hans Mierendorff
- Eugen Rex
- Frida Richard
- Charles Willy Kayser
- Karl Beckersachs
- Walter Slezak
- Otto Reinwald
- Kurt Gerron
- Rosa Valetti
- Hermann Picha
- Hugo Fischer-Köppe
- Karl Harbacher
- Hilde Jary
- Hilde Jennings
- Theo Körner
- Clementine Plessner
- Lydia Potechina
- Paul Rehkopf
- Ida Wüst

== Bibliography ==
- Bock, Hans-Michael & Bergfelder, Tim. The Concise CineGraph. Encyclopedia of German Cinema. Berghahn Books, 2009.
