= Gypsy Blood (1920 film) =

1920 film directed by Karl Otto Krause

- Directed by: Karl Otto Krause
- Written by: Franz Rauch; Karl Otto Krause
- Starring: Lya De Putti; Carl Fenz; Paul Hansen
- Cinematography: Kurt Lande
- Music by: Karl Otto Krause; Georges Bizet
- Production company: Karl Otto Krause-Film
- Release date: 20 August 1920
- Country: Germany
- Languages: Silent; German intertitles

Gypsy Blood (German: Zigeunerblut) is a 1920 German silent film directed by Karl Otto Krause and starring Lya De Putti, Carl Fenz and Paul Hansen. It is based on Georges Bizet's opera Carmen and should not be confused with the 1918 German silent film Carmen.

== Cast ==
- Lya De Putti
- Carl Fenz
- Paul Tenor
- Max Laurence
- Fritz Moleska
- Hilde Wörner

== Bibliography ==
- Bock, Hans-Michael & Bergfelder, Tim. The Concise CineGraph. Encyclopedia of German Cinema. Berghahn Books, 2009.
