= Ferdinand von Alten =

German actor (1885–1933)

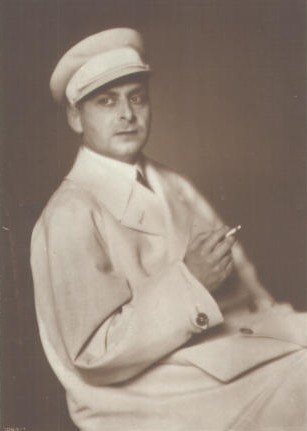
- Born: Baron von Lamezan auf Altenhofen; 13 April 1885; St. Petersburg, Russian Empire
- Died: 17 March 1933 (aged 47); Dessau, Germany
- Other names: Theo von Alten
- Occupation: Actor
- Years active: 1916–1933

Ferdinand von Alten (born Baron von Lamezan auf Altenhofen; 13 April 1885 – 16 March 1933) was a Russian-German actor.

== Selected filmography ==
- The Blue Lantern (1918)
- Madame Récamier (1920)
- Anna Boleyn (1920)
- Catherine the Great (1920)
- The Girl from Acker Street (1920)
- The Secret of the Mummy (1921)
- The Pearl of the Orient (1921)
- Danton (1921)
- The Bull of Olivera (1921)
- The Hunt for the Truth (1921)
- Peter Voss, Thief of Millions (1921)
- Roswolsky's Mistress (1921)
- The Earl of Essex (1922)
- Othello (1922)
- The Love Story of Cesare Ubaldi (1922)
- The Money Devil (1923)
- The Flame (1923)
- The Merchant of Venice (1923)
- Man Against Man (1924)
- Tragedy in the House of Habsburg (1924)
- Countess Donelli (1924)
- Wallenstein (1925)
- The Dice Game of Life (1925)
- Struggle for the Soil (1925)
- Chamber Music (1925)
- Fadette (1926)
- My Friend the Chauffeur (1926)
- The Flames Lie (1926)
- Fräulein Mama (1926)
- The Master of Death (1926)
- The Son of Hannibal (1926)
- The Student of Prague (1926)
- Queen of the Boulevards (1927)
- German Women - German Faithfulness (1927)
- Benno Stehkragen (1927)
- The Queen of Spades (1927)
- Luther (1928)
- Sajenko the Soviet (1928)
- Vienna, City of My Dreams (1928)
- The Woman on the Rack (1928)
- Queen Louise (1928)
- Champagne (1928)
- Ludwig II, King of Bavaria (1929)
- Roses Bloom on the Moorland (1929)
- Hocuspocus (1930)
- Police Spy 77 (1930)
- 1914 (1931)
- The Theft of the Mona Lisa (1931)
- Ash Wednesday (1931)
- Wibbel the Tailor (1931)
- Marshal Forwards (1932)
- Secret Agent (1932)
- The Mad Bomberg (1932)
- Countess Mariza (1932)
- The Pride of Company Three (1932)
- Things Are Getting Better Already (1932)
- This One or None (1932)
- Three from the Unemployment Office (1932)
- The First Right of the Child (1932)

== Bibliography ==
- Jung, Uli & Schatzberg, Walter. Beyond Caligari: The Films of Robert Wiene. Berghahn Books, 1999.
