= Night and No Morning =

1921 film directed by Karl Grune

- Directed by: Karl Grune
- Written by: Paul Rosenhayn
- Starring: Eugen Klöpfer; Hans Mierendorff; Hanni Weisse; Albert Steinrück
- Cinematography: Karl Hasselmann
- Production company: Gloria-Film
- Release date: 17 August 1921
- Country: Germany
- Languages: Silent; German intertitles

Night and No Morning (German: Die Nacht ohne Morgen) is a 1921 German silent drama film directed by Karl Grune and starring Eugen Klöpfer, Hans Mierendorff and Hanni Weisse. It premiered in Berlin on 17 August 1921.

== Cast ==
- Eugen Klöpfer as Mac Chifford
- Hans Mierendorff as Lawyer Coborn
- Hanni Weisse as Frau Chifford
- Albert Steinrück as Zirkusdirektor Mortera
- Grit Hegesa as Frau Mortera
- Edgar Klitzsch as Varieté-Agent
- Paul Rehkopf as Artist
- Ludwig Rex
- Ferdinand Robert
- Franz Verdier

== Bibliography ==
- Grange, William. Cultural Chronicle of the Weimar Republic.Scarecrow Press, 2008.
