= Comedians (1925 film) =

1925 film directed by Karl Grune

- Directed by: Karl Grune
- Written by: Felix Salten
- Starring: Lya De Putti; Eugen Klöpfer; Hermann Picha
- Cinematography: Karl Hasselmann
- Music by: Willy Schmidt-Gentner
- Production company: Stern-Film
- Distributed by: Landlicht-Filmverleih
- Release date: 23 February 1925
- Running time: 87 minutes
- Country: Germany
- Languages: Silent; German intertitles

Comedians (German: Komödianten), also known as Strolling Players, is a 1925 German silent drama film directed by Karl Grune and starring Lya De Putti, Eugen Klöpfer and Hermann Picha. The film's sets were designed by the art director Karl Görge and Erich Zander.

== Plot ==
Axel Swinborne is a celebrated stage star who wants to relax, and takes the train on vacation. As he leans out of the window, his jacket gets tangled in the lever and he is hurled out of the window. Swinborne is taken to an inn where he is nursed back to health by Lydia, who is an aspiring actress but far less well-known. As an amateur, she travels from place to place with a group of strolling players. Their audience is coarse and rowdy, and the men also like to get physical. Sometimes rotten eggs are thrown at the amateur troupe, and sometimes the drunken men in the audience become violent or touch Lydia. From Lydia's point of view, the men turn into pigs with corresponding pig-head masks.

Swinborne only realises the next day that he is among other actors. When the leader of the troupe recognises Swinborne, he comes up with the idea of using the name of the famous Axel Swinborne to promote the company and make a profit from it. Out of gratitude, Swinborne agrees to take part in the next performance. He thinks Lydia has talent and offers to do whatever it takes to make her big as a theatre artist, but on a much more professional basis. He negotiates a “transfer fee” with the troupe leader.

Later, Lydia has become a well-known stage actress. She is courted by a prince who regularly comes to her performances. Swinborne also feels very close to her beyond the purely professional and proposes marriage to her, although much older than she is. Lydia agrees, but only to show her gratitude to her mentor. However, when Swinborne's monocle falls under the table and the prince and Lydia disappear to search for it, they take the opportunity to secretly kiss under the table. As Swinborne is leaving by train, he sees Lydia and the prince embracing on the balcony of his house. He pulls the emergency brake, rushes back and catches the two in flagrante.

Swinborne is filled with jealousy. At the next theatrical performance, he swaps the blanks of a revolver needed for the play for real ammunition and shoots his scene partner Lydia on stage. She is only slightly injured, but Swinborne has to pay for his act with a prison term. Lydia asks the prince to visit Swinborne in prison, but Swinborne refuses to exchange a word with him.

Time passes and Swinborne is released. He regrets his deed, and has aged. The prince and Lydia are married to each other. As a wedding present, the prince had given Lydia a life-size statue of herself dressed for one of her theatrical roles, situated in a public park. Lydia's old colleagues from the theatre troupe stop in the town. Swinborne joins them, but his decline is unmistakable: the once-celebrated actor is only allowed to hand out show bills for the performances. As Axel Swinborne walks through the park, he stops at the Lydia sculpture. In his imagination she comes to life and he is back on stage with her. And the audience applauds.

== Cast ==
- Lya De Putti as Die Sentimentale
- Eugen Klöpfer as Axel Swinborne - Schauspieler
- Hermann Picha as Direktors Garderobier
- Viktor Schwanneke as Direktor des Residenztheaters
- Jaro Fürth as Inspazient
- Fritz Rasp as Jugendlicher Liebhaber
- Fritz Kampers as Der erste Held
- Owen Gorin as Ein junger Prinz
- Ferry Sikla as Schmierendirektor
- Margarete Kupfer as Die Frau Direktor
- Adolf E. Licho as Charakterspieler
- Joseph Römer
- Robert Leffler

== Bibliography ==
- Bock, Hans-Michael & Bergfelder, Tim. The Concise CineGraph. Encyclopedia of German Cinema. Berghahn Books, 2009.
