= Erling Hanson =

Norwegian actor (1888–1978)

- Born: May 1, 1888; Kristiania (now Oslo), Norway
- Died: August 16, 1978 (aged 90); Oslo, Norway
- Occupation: Actor

Erling Georg Stefan Hanson (May 1, 1888 – August 16, 1978) was a Norwegian stage and film actor.

== Life ==
Erling Hanson was born in Kristiania (now Oslo), Norway, the son of the physician Alfred Hanson (1844–1819) and Emmy Amalie Hanson (née Jørgensen, 1864–1944). He died in Oslo in 1978.

== Career ==
Hanson made his stage debut at the National Theater in Bergen in 1908 in Alf Harbitz's play Rakels hjem. He then performed in Ludovica Levy's touring theater. As a film actor, he appeared in one Danish silent film in 1920, seven silent films in Germany between 1920 and 1924, and five Norwegian films between 1941 and 1944. He headed the Rogaland Theater from 1924 to 1926.

== Filmography ==
- 1920: Blade af Satans bog as the disciple John
- 1920: Anna Boleyn as Count Percy
- 1921: Das Geheimnis der Mumie as Harrison, a police inspector
- 1921: Treibende Kraft
- 1921: Die sterbende Stadt
- 1921: Des Lebens und der Liebe Wellen
- 1924: Der Sprung ins Leben
- 1924: Der Mann um Mitternacht as Sigurd Hoff
- 1941: Hansen og Hansen as a chairman
- 1941: Gullfjellet as the bank director in Oslo
- 1942: Det æ'kke te å tru as Wang, a lawyer
- 1943: Den nye lægen as Hoffmann, a director
- 1944: Kommer du, Elsa? as Bjerke, a doctor at the sanatorium
