= Hermann Boettcher =

German actor (1866–1935)

Hermann Böttcher
- Born: Hermann Gotthilf Ferdinand Boettcher; 21 November 1866; Königsberg, Kingdom of Prussia
- Died: 7 May 1935 (aged 68); Röblinsee, Nazi Germany
- Occupation: Actor
- Years active: 1915–1932 (film)

Hermann Gotthilf Ferdinand Boettcher (12 November 1866 – 7 May 1935) was a German stage and film actor.

== Selected filmography ==
- The Man of Action (1919)
- The Swabian Maiden (1919)
- Madame Récamier (1920)
- The Big Light (1920)
- Four Around a Woman (1921)
- The Secret of Bombay (1921)
- Driving Force (1921)
- Bigamy (1922)
- The Homecoming of Odysseus (1922)
- The Girl from Capri (1924)
- By Order of Pompadour (1924)
- The Mistress of Monbijou (1924)
- The Prince and the Maid (1924)
- Anne-Liese of Dessau (1925)
- Countess Ironing-Maid (1926)
- The Bohemian Dancer (1926)
- Princess Olala (1928)
- Immorality (1928)
- My Heart is a Jazz Band (1929)
- Napoleon at Saint Helena (1929)
- Taxi at Midnight (1930)
- Police Spy 77 (1930)
- Retreat on the Rhine (1930)
- Hans in Every Street (1930)
- Marriage in Name Only (1930)
- The Dancer of Sanssouci (1932)

== Bibliography ==
- Hardt, Ursula. From Caligari to California: Erich Pommer's life in the International Film Wars. Berghahn Books, 1996.
