= Man Against Man (1924 film) =

1924 film

- Directed by: Hans Steinhoff
- Written by: Adolf Lantz
- Based on: Mensch gegen Mensch by Norbert Jacques
- Produced by: Hanns Lippmann
- Starring: Alfred Abel; Mady Christians; Tullio Carminati
- Cinematography: Werner Brandes
- Production company: Gloria-Film
- Distributed by: UFA
- Release date: 2 December 1924
- Country: Germany
- Languages: Silent; German intertitles

Man Against Man (German: Mensch gegen Mensch) is a 1924 German silent drama film directed by Hans Steinhoff and starring Alfred Abel, Mady Christians and Tullio Carminati. It is based on the novel with the same title by Norbert Jacques. The film's sets were designed by the art directors Alfred Junge and Oscar Friedrich Werndorff.

== Cast ==
In alphabetical order

- Alfred Abel
- Olga Belajeff
- Tullio Carminati
- Mady Christians
- Wilhelm Diegelmann
- Heinrich Gotho
- Hans Mierendorff
- Albert Paulig
- Harald Paulsen
- Paul Rehkopf
- Ferdinand von Alten

== Bibliography ==
- Grange, William. Cultural Chronicle of the Weimar Republic. Scarecrow Press, 2008.
