= The Woman at the Crossroads =

The Woman at the Crossroads may refer to:

- The Woman at the Crossroads (1919 film), German silent film
- The Woman at the Crossroads (1938 film), German film
