= If Only It Weren't Love =

1925 film directed by Robert Dinesen

- Directed by: Robert Dinesen
- Written by: Robert Dinesen; Walter Jonas; Emil Scholl (novel)
- Starring: Jenny Jugo; Fritz Alberti
- Cinematography: Julius Balting
- Music by: Willy Schmidt-Gentner
- Production company: Phoebus Film
- Distributed by: Phoebus Film
- Release date: 8 February 1925
- Country: Germany
- Languages: Silent; German intertitles

If Only It Weren't Love (German: Wenn die Liebe nicht wär'!) is a 1925 German silent drama film directed by Robert Dinesen, and starring Jenny Jugo and Fritz Alberti.

The film's sets were designed by the art director Willi Herrmann.

== Cast ==
In alphabetical order

- Fritz Alberti
- Harry Halm
- Antonie Jaeckel
- Jenny Jugo
- Frieda Lehndorf
- Mary Nolan
- Karl Platen
- Hans Adalbert Schlettow
- Daisy Torrens
- Elsa Wagner

== Bibliography ==
- Grange, William. Cultural Chronicle of the Weimar Republic. Scarecrow Press, 2008.
