= The Boy in Blue (1919 film) =

1919 film

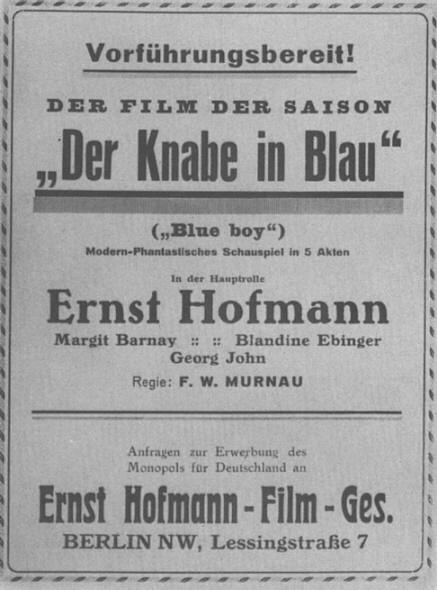
- Advertisement
- Directed by: F. W. Murnau
- Written by: Edda Ottershausen
- Produced by: Ernst Hofmann
- Starring: Ernst Hofmann
- Cinematography: Karl Freund; Carl Hoffmann
- Release date: July 1919
- Running time: 54 minutes
- Country: Weimar Republic
- Languages: Silent; German intertitles

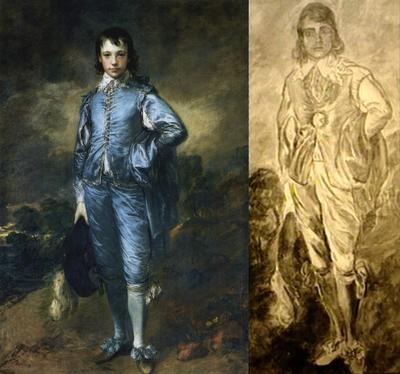
Comparison of Gainsborough's painting with the one in the film, note the cursed jewel in the film painting

The Boy in Blue (German: Der Knabe in Blau and also known as Emerald of Death) is a 1919 silent German drama film directed by F. W. Murnau. It was Murnau's directorial debut. The film is now considered to be a lost film, though the Deutsche Kinemathek film archive possesses 35 small fragments ranging from two to eleven frames in length.

Thomas Gainsborough's painting The Blue Boy and Oscar Wilde's novel The Picture of Dorian Gray were inspirations for Murnau to create this film.

== Plot ==
Thomas von Weerth (Ernst Hofmann) is a poverty-stricken aristocrat who lives in his broken-down castle with a single old servant (Karl Platen). His sole expensive remaining possession is a painting of an ancestor (similar to Thomas Gainsborough's painting The Blue Boy), which depicts the ancestor wearing a gigantic emerald. According to family myth, the emerald is cursed, and the son of the ancestor hid the jewel somewhere in the castle to stop the curse. Weerth has been searching for it for years.

One night, Weerth dreams that his ancestor steps out of the painting and shows him where the emerald is. The next morning, Weerth goes to the spot and indeed finds the emerald. The servant pleads with him to throw it away, but he refuses.

That night, a roving band of gypsies comes to the castle. They sing, dance and put on skits for von Weerth, who falls instantly in love with a blonde gypsy girl (Blandine Ebinger). As she forces von Weerth to dance attendance on her, the rest of the gypsies steal the emerald and everything else in the castle and set fire to the building. The gypsy girl laughs as she and her comrades flee.

Von Weerth falls seriously ill. A young gypsy actress (Margit Barnay), however, fell in love with von Weerth. She now returns, nurses him back to health, and they fall in love.

== Cast ==
- Ernst Hofmann as Thomas von Weerth
- Blandine Ebinger as Schöne Zigeunerin / Fair gypsy
- Margit Barnay as Junge Schauspielerin / Young actress
- Karl Platen as Alter Diener / Old servant
- Georg John as Zigeuner-Hauptmann / Gypsy commander
- Leonhard Haskel as Theaterdirektor
- Marie von Buelow as Bettlerin
- Rudolf Klix as Bobby
- Hedda Kemp as Dame im Schleier
- Hans Otterhausen as Guckkastenmann
- Hans Schaup as Der alte Dietrich / Thomas' Diener

== See also ==
- List of lost films
