= The Sleeping Volcano =

1922 German silent drama film

- Directed by: James Bauer
- Written by: James Bauer; Ludwig Marr
- Starring: Margit Barnay; Hans Mierendorff; Margarete Schön
- Production company: Lucifer Film
- Release date: 14 February 1922
- Country: Germany
- Languages: Silent; German intertitles

The Sleeping Volcano (German: Der schlummernde Vulkan) is a 1922 German silent drama film directed by James Bauer and starring Margit Barnay, Hans Mierendorff and Margarete Schön.

== Cast ==
In alphabetical order

- Margit Barnay
- Friedrich Berger
- Hertha Katsch
- Hans Mierendorff
- Paul Rehkopf
- Joseph Römer
- Margarete Schön

== Bibliography ==
- Grange, William. Cultural Chronicle of the Weimar Republic. Scarecrow Press, 2008.
