= Driving Force (1921 film) =

1921 film directed by Zoltán Nagy

- Directed by: Zoltán Nagy
- Written by: Olga Alsen; Victorien Sardou
- Produced by: Erich Pommer
- Starring: Lya De Putti; Fern Andra
- Cinematography: A. O. Weitzenberg
- Production company: Decla-Bioscop
- Distributed by: Decla-Bioscop
- Release date: 31 March 1921
- Country: Germany
- Languages: Silent; German intertitles

Driving Force (German: Treibende Kraft) is a 1921 German silent film directed by Zoltán Nagy and starring Lya De Putti and Fern Andra. It premiered at the Marmorhaus in Berlin.

The film's sets were designed by the art directors Hans Jacoby and Franz Seemann.

== Cast ==
- Fern Andra
- Erling Hanson
- Tronier Funder
- Lya De Putti
- Magda Madeleine
- Hermann Böttcher

== Bibliography ==
- Hardt, Ursula (1996). From Caligari to California: Erich Pommer's Life in the International Film Wars. Providence: Berghahn Books. ISBN 978-1-57181-930-7.
