= Eugen Klöpfer =

German actor

- Born: Eugen Gottlob Klöpfer; 10 March 1886; Talheim, Heilbronn, German Empire
- Died: 3 March 1950 (aged 63); Wiesbaden, West Germany
- Occupation: Actor
- Years active: 1920–1945, 1949–1950

Eugen Gottlob Klöpfer (10 March 1886 in Talheim, Heilbronn – 3 March 1950 in Wiesbaden) was a German actor.

== Early life ==
Born to Karl Klöpfer and his wife Karoline, née Hörsch, Eugen attended the Realschule (secondary school) in Heilbronn. He subsequently attended the Lateinschule (Latin School) in Lauffen and then the Karlsgymnasium in Heilbronn.

== Career ==
Although he started an apprenticeship with a lumber business in Munich, Klöpfer soon discovered that his passion was the theater. He joined the Theatre Association of Munich and performed at various provincial theaters. In 1905 he was cast in his first role in Landshut, afterwards playing in Ingolstadtand Biel. In 1909 he came to the Volkstheater München (Munich People's Theater). From 1914 to 1918, he performed in Colmar, Erfurt, Bonn and Frankfurt am Main.

After the First World War, Klöpfer relocated to Berlin. There he played from 1920 to 1923 at the Deutsches Theater, then at various stages, starting in 1925 in Vienna and Salzburg. Finally, he toured Europe and South America. He played the title role in Carl Zuckmayer's 1927 play Schinderhannes. In the 1920s, he appeared in numerous silent films.

=== Nazi era ===
After the Nazi seizure of power, he was promoted to the Presiding Board of the Reich Film Chamber, under Joseph Goebbels, and was also chairman of Goebbels' artist donation. In 1934, Klöpfer was designated as a Staatsschauspieler (i.e. an actor of national importance). He was also appointed the director of the Volksbühne ("People's Theatre") in Berlin. From 1935 he was appointed Vice President of the Ministry of Arts and joined the board of UFA. In 1936 he was appointed general director of Berlin's Theater am Nollendorfplatz. In 1937, Klöpfer joined the Nazi Party. In 1940, he played the role of Landschaftskonsulenten Sturm in Veit Harlan's antisemitic Nazi propaganda film Jud Süß. In August 1944, towards the end of the Second World War, Klöpfer was added by Adolf Hitler to the Gottbegnadeten-Liste, a list of important German artists, which exempted him from military service, including service on the home front.

=== Postwar ===
After 1945, Klöpfer was banned and spent two months in prison in 1948. After a denazification trial, he was exonerated of the charge of complicity in the death of Joachim Gottschalk. In 1949, he began performing again with his own ensemble in Cologne and Neustadt in der Pfalz. He died in 1950 of pneumonia and is buried in the South Cemetery in Wiesbaden.

== Filmography ==
- 1919: The Dancer
- 1919: Die Arche
- 1919: Cagliostros Totenhand
- 1920: Die Frau ohne Dienstag
- 1920: Menschen
- 1920: Der ewige Mönch im Banne der Musik
- 1920: Sehnsucht
- 1920: Mary Magdalene as the secretary
- 1920: Humanity Unleashed as Karenow
- 1920: Sturm
- 1920: Der Leidensweg eines Achtzehnjährigen
- 1920: Das Mädchen aus der Ackerstraße. 2. Teil
- 1920: Das Geheimnis der Spielhölle
- 1920: Um der Liebe willen
- 1920: Die lebende Fackel
- 1921: Die Bestie im Menschen
- 1921: Flachsmann als Erzieher
- 1921: Verlogene Moral
- 1921: The Rats as Mr. John
- 1921: Die Lou von Montmartre
- 1921: Night and No Morning as Mac Chifford
- 1921: The Vulture Wally as Der Gellner-Vincenz
- 1921 :The Fateful Day
- 1921: Der Totenklaus
- 1921: Die Schuldige
- 1921: Betrüger des Volkes
- 1922: Money in the Streets
- 1922: The Burning Soil as Peter Rog
- 1922: Menschenopfer
- 1922: Macbeth
- 1922: The Count of Charolais as the president of the senate
- 1922 :The Earl of Essex as Earl of Essex
- 1922: The False Dimitri as Boris Godunov
- 1923: Explosion
- 1923: The Expulsion as Son Steyer
- 1923 :The Street as the middle-aged man
- 1924: New Year's Eve as the man
- 1924: Carlos and Elisabeth as Prince Philip
- 1924: Das goldene Kalb
- 1925 :Oh Those Glorious Old Student Days
- 1925: Comedians as Axel Swinborne
- 1925:The Elegant Bunch as Anton Paudler
- 1925: Goetz von Berlichingen of the Iron Hand as Götz von Berlichingen
- 1925: Der erste Stand: Der Großkapitalist
- 1926: Superfluous People as Andrej Karlowitsch Siganew
- 1926: Fadette as Barbeau
- 1927: The Convicted as Karl Hartmann
- 1928: Luther as Martin Luther
- 1929: Katharina Knie as Old Knie
- 1931: 1914 as Emperor Franz Josef
- 1931: The Duke of Reichstadt as Grenadier Flambeau
- 1931: The Paw as Lorenzi
- 1932: Unheimliche Geschichten as Chefarzt
- 1932: Haunted People as Vincenz Olivier
- 1933: Refugees as Bernhard Laudy
- 1934: William Tell as Heinrich Von Meltchtal
- 1935:The Private Life of Louis XIV as Prince Charles Louis
- 1935: Pygmalion as Alfred Doolittle
- 1935: I Was Jack Mortimer as Pedro Montemayor
- 1935: Anschlag auf Schweda
- 1936 :Love's Awakening (1936) as Dr. Bergriedel
- 1938: Youth as Hoppe
- 1938: Der Spieler
- 1939: Detours to Happiness as Mr. von Hanna
- 1939: The Strange Woman
- 1940:The Eternal Spring as the employer
- 1940: Jud Süß as Councilman Sturm
- 1940: Friedrich Schiller – The Triumph of a Genius as Christian Friedrich Daniel Schubart
- 1941: My Life for Ireland as Duffy
- 1941: Friedemann Bach as Johann Sebastian Bach
- 1941: Jakko
- 1942: Die goldene Stadt as Melchior Jobs
- Voice of the Heart (1942) as Vater Wendland
- 1943:The Endless Road as Friedrich List
- 1943: Gabriele Dambrone as Gotthart
- 1944: Die Zaubergeige
- 1944: Der Erbförster
- 1944: Philharmonic
- 1945: Anna Alt as Prof. Burghardt
- 1945: The Noltenius Brothers as Mr. Karsten
- 1945: Puppenspieler
- 1945: Shiva und die Galgenblume
