= Karl Grune =

Austrian filmmaker (1890–1962)

Karl Grune (22 January 1890 – 2 October 1962) was an Austrian film director and writer who made many silent films in the 1920s.

Grune was born into a Jewish family in Vienna, where he later attended drama school. He volunteered in the First World War, where an injury temporarily deprived him of the ability to speak in 1918.

After the war he made his directing debut in 1919 with Menschen in Ketten ("People in Chains"). In 1923 he made Schlagende Wetter with Liane Haid and Eugen Klöpfer in the leading roles. The film is a notable early example of naturalism in film making, at a time when expressionism was the norm. Also that year he made Die Straße ("The Street"), which is considered Grune's most notable film. In 1926 he made Die Brüder Schellenberg ("The Brothers Schellenberg") with Conrad Veidt and Lil Dagover. Many of his early films are now lost.

He emigrated to England in 1933 and there made Abdul the Damned with Fritz Kortner in 1935, and in 1936 he filmed Ruggiero Leoncavallo's opera Pagliacci with Richard Tauber.

In his later career he turned to producing films in the 1940s. He died in Bournemouth, England in 1962.

== Films ==
Grune directed the following films in his career:

- Pagliacci (1936)
- The Marriage of Corbal (1936)
- Abdul the Damned (1935)
- Peter Voss, Thief of Millions (1932)
- The Yellow House of King-Fu (1931)
- The Yellow House of Rio (1931)
- Katharina Knie (1929)
- Waterloo (1929)
- Spy of Madame Pompadour (1928)
- At the Edge of the World (1927)
- Queen Louise (1927)
- The Brothers Schellenberg (1926)
- Jealousy (1925)
- Comedians (1925)
- Arabella (1924)
- The Street (1923)
- Schlagende Wetter (1923)
- The Count of Charolais (1922)
- Frauenopfer (1922)
- Der Stärkste Trieb (1922)
- Die Nacht der Medici (1922)
- The Hunt for the Truth (1921)
- Night and No Morning (1921)
- Nachtbesuch in der Northernbank (1921)
- Man Overboard (1921)
- Aus eines Mannes Mädchenjahren (1919)
- Der Mädchenhirt (1919)
- Menschen in Ketten (1919)

Grune was also a writer for Aus eines Mannes Mädchenjahren, Der Mädchenhirt, Mann über Bord, Die Straße, Die Brüder Schellenberg and Am Rande der Welt. He also cowrote Manon. Das hohe Lied der Liebe (1919) and Wer unter Euch ohne Sünde ist... (1921) with Beate Schach.
