= Ebba Holm =

Danish painter and engraver

Ebba Regitze Ellida Olga Holm (1889–1967) was a Danish painter and engraver who is remembered in particular for her illustrations of Dante's Divine Comedy. She fostered close contacts with Italy, contributing to the Italian engraving journal Xilografia in the mid-1920s.

== Biography ==
Born on 29 May 1889 in the Frederiksberg district of Copenhagen, Ebba Regitze Ellida Olga Holm was the daughter of the merchant Carl Gustav Adolf Holm (1865–1940) and Olga Marie Jensen (1867–1932). Influenced by her parents' interest in art and culture, she studied painting at Vilhelmine Bang's art school, entering the Royal Danish Academy of Fine Arts in 1908. Here she was introduced to traditional Danish painting under Otto Bache, Valdemar Irminger and Sigurd Wandel, while Joakim Skovgaard taught her fresco painting. She graduated as a painter in 1913.

Holm travelled frequently, to Germany (1910–12 and 1931–32), Italy (several trips from 1913 to 1939) and France (1925 and 1929). In Italy, she studied old Italian painting and book art. Her works include a portrait of her sister (1914) and De tre Generationer (1918). She also painted landscapes and interiors. In Italy, she painted town scenes and mountainous landscapes.

Holm was also active as a graphic artist, working for the journal Xilografia from 1924 to 1926. She executed 107 relief prints (woodcuts and linoleum cuts) between 1923 and 1928, reproductions of which were included in the Danish translation of the Divine Comedy in 1929. She contributed six woodcuts with Franciscan motifs to an exhibition on Franciscan art in Assisi in 1927. Her work was included in the Florence Lyceumi exhibition (1933) and the Exhibition of Graphic Art in London (1938).

Ebba Holm died in Copenhagen on 30 November 1967.
