= The Mistress of the World =

1919 silent film

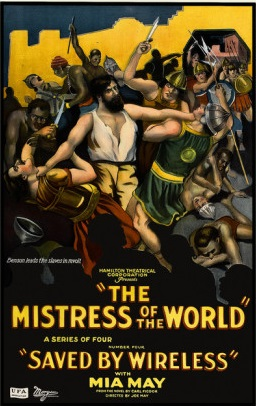
- American promotional poster from the re-edited 1922 version, Number 4. Saved by Wireless
- Directed by: Joseph Klein (Parts 1 and 4); Joe May (all); Uwe Jens Krafft (Parts 4,5,6); Karl Gerhardt (Part 7)
- Written by: Karl Figdor; Ruth Goetz; Richard Hutter; Joe May; Wilhelm Roellinghoff
- Based on: Die Herrin der Welt by Karl Figdor
- Produced by: Joe May
- Starring: Mia May; Michael Bohnen; Henry Sze; Hans Mierendorff
- Cinematography: Werner Brandes
- Music by: Ferdinand Hummel
- Production company: May-Film
- Distributed by: UFA
- Release dates: 1919 (Parts I-IV); 1920 (Parts V-VIII)
- Country: Weimar Republic
- Languages: Silent film German intertitles
- Budget: 5.9 million marks (equivalent to 7 million 2021 €)

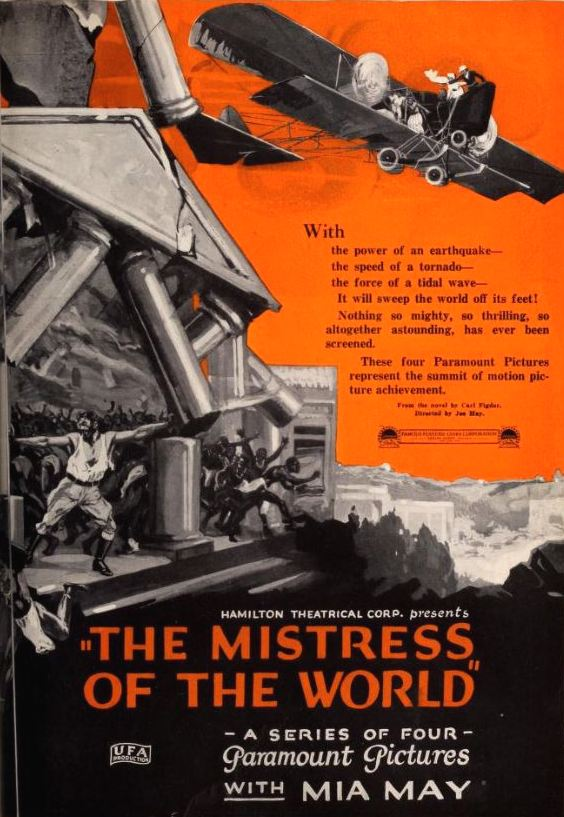
1919 ad

The Mistress of the World (German: Die Herrin der Welt) is an eight-part 1919 silent film made in the Weimar Republic starring Mia May in the lead role. The film, under the creative control of director Joe May, is noted for bringing together talent from across German cinema, including many who would work behind the camera during the emergence of German Expressionist cinema.

The story follows a young Danish woman on her globe-trotting adventures to find the legendary lost treasure of the Queen of Sheba that she hopes will enable her to bring revenge on the man that drew her father to commit suicide and led to her own social destruction. The first film was released in Germany on 5 December 1919, and this was followed each week by the release of the subsequent episodes.

== Plot ==
=== Part 1, The Girlfriend of the Yellow Man ===
German: Die Herrin der Welt 1. Teil – Die Freundin des gelben Mannes

Young Danish adventuress Maud Gregaards (Mia May) answers an advertisement to take up a position as a governess in China. There, she falls victim to the white slave-trade and is placed in a brothel. She is freed by her travel companion, Dr. Kien-Lung (Henry Sze), but the physician is then kidnapped by the devilish Hai-Fung, who also captures and tortures Maud. Chinese consul Madsen (Michael Bohnen) releases both Dr. Kein-Lung and Maud from the clutches of Hai-Fung. It is later revealed that Maud is harbouring a secret plot of revenge that brought her to China. Maud decides to tell her two trusted companions what that secret is.

=== Part 2, The Race for Life ===
German: Die Geschichte der Maud Gregaards

The second part of this film is a prequel to the first part. Maud explains to her companions why she travelled to China. Maud's father was an archivist at the Foreign Office in Denmark. There he was blackmailed to hand over a Chinese secret agreement. Unable either to face the blackmailers or to betray his country, he commits suicide. Maud later falls in love with Baron Murphy (Hans Mierendorff) for whom she works as a translator, and they become engaged. Unknowingly, Maud translates the Chinese document for the Baron, after which he takes the secret and flees the country, leaving Maud to be arrested as a spy. In jail, Maud gives birth to the Baron's child but the baby dies in prison. On being released from jail, Maud comes into the possession of information about the rabbi of Kuan-Fu, who is said to have knowledge of the hidden treasure of the Queen of Sheba. She decides to travel to China to find the treasure which she hopes will allow her to take revenge on her former lover.

=== Part 3, The City of Gold ===
German: Der Rabbi von Kuan-Fu

Maud Gregaards, Kien-Lung and Consul Madsen travel together to find the rabbi of Kuan-Fu, the last surviving member of an ancient Jewish settlement in Canton, who is said to be in possession of the secret to the fabled treasure of the Queen of Sheba. The three companions enter the ancient ruins where the rabbi is believed to live, watched suspiciously by the local natives. On finding the old rabbi, Madsen reveals that he is Jewish and gains the trust of the holy man. They are entrusted with the Gem of Astarte, which was once given to King Solomon by the Queen of Sheba, and within it the map to the treasure. Before he can reveal any further information the rabbi dies. On leaving the ruins Madsen is injured fighting with the natives, and is abandoned by Kien-Lung; the Gem of Astarte is briefly lost in the same encounter. As Madsen meets back up with Kien-Lung, a fight breaks out between the two men, only Maud's intervention separates the two.

=== Part 4, King Macombe ===
German: König Macombe

Maud, along with, Madsen and Kien-Lung, adventure into Central Africa, to search for the biblical city of Ophir where the treasure lies. There they enter the realm of King Makombe, at the heart of the Cult of Astarte. The tribe's Medicine Man (Louis Brody) steals the Gem of Astarte to appease the natives against the invaders. Maud, Madsen and Dr. Kien-Lung flee but during the escape Kien-Lung is struck by a poisoned arrow and dies. Maud and Madsen find shelter in a cave, where they are hidden from their pursuers. In the final scene, Maud and Madsen reach the gates of Ophir.

=== Part 5, Ophir, City of the Past ===
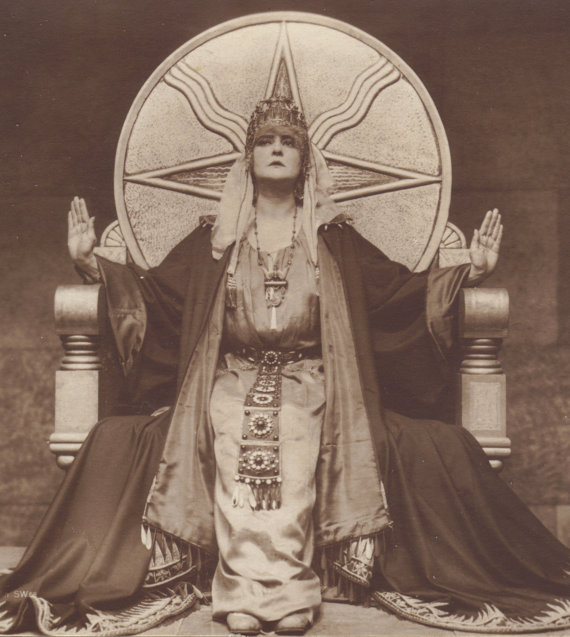
Mia May as the embodiment of the goddess Astarte in Part V

German: Teil – Ophir, die Stadt der Vergangenheit

Maud and Madsen eventually find the City of Ophir, but are discovered in the treasury of the Queen of Sheba and are captured as intruders. Maud is to be sacrificed because she had desecrated the sacred ground of the city. Madsen is sent to the slave city of Sabyten, where he is to suffer life as a slave. As Maud is laid on the sacrificial altar, the high priest sees she wears the necklace of Astarte, and Maud is declared as the reincarnation of the goddess, whose return had been predicted. Madsen escapes from captivity with the help of an American engineer, Allan Stanley (Paul Hansen), whom he met in the slave city, and returns to rescue Maud. The three find the treasure and manage to telegraph the outside world for help. An American expedition hears their plea and sends a plane to rescue all three, but Madsen is killed in the escape. As they fly from the city an earthquake leaves the mysterious City of Ophir in ruins.

=== Part 6, The Woman with the Billions ===
German: Teil – Die Frau mit den Milliarden

Maud Gregaards, now incredibly rich, seeks out a new life, and under the name Maud Fergusson, settles in the United States. The American newspaper publisher, Fletcher, who sent the rescuing aircraft to Ophir, turns her story into headline news, making Maud a celebrity. This story is attacked by a rival newspaper, Harrison's Universe, run by Hannibal Harrison (Wilhelm Diegelmann), declaring the whole adventure a fantasy. Both tabloids are reduced to a war over Maud, while a theater agent, Karpeles (Paul Morgan), makes a film about Maud's adventure. Although little more than fabrication, the movie makes her a superstar. Meanwhile, Maud and Allan fall in love and leave for Europe.

=== Part 7: The Benefactress of Mankind ===
German: Teil – Die Wohltäterin der Menschheit

The billionaire Maud Fergusson, attempts to start a new life with Allan Stanley. The wealth gained from the Queen of Sheba's treasure allows the "Mistress of the World" to live a carefree life in Denmark and the two plan to marry. Stanley insists that before they marry that Maud tells him the name of the man who is responsible for all her misfortunes. Maud, however, has put her past behind her and just wants to find peace. She plans to become a benefactor of mankind, sponsoring research and technology projects with their billions. Allan, meanwhile, develops a remote fusion machine that can melt metal. Since guns can be destroyed with this powerful invention, he soon falls into the sights of ruthless weapon manufacturers that want to stop its production. On the day of the invention's first public demonstration, there is a huge explosion, caused by Maud's nemesis Baron Murphy. Allan is killed in the explosion.

=== Part 8: The Revenge of Maud Fergusson ===
German: Teil – Die Rache der Maud Fergusson

The death of Allan, shortly before their wedding, sends Maud on a quest for bloody revenge. Helped by a detective, Hunt, (Rudolf Lettinger), Maud discovers that Baron Murphy is behind her fiancé's death and sparks a newspaper campaign against the Baron to expose him. Murphy loses his entire fortune and is forced to leave the country and dies while desperately battling through a snowstorm. Hunt also discovers that a young academic Credo Merville (Ernst Hofmann) is Murphy and Maud's son, who is supposed to have died shortly after his birth. In the end, mother and son fall into each other's arms.

== Development ==
=== Production ===
Austrian film producer Joe May conceived the idea for filming The Mistress of the World, which he loosely based on the novel Die Herrin der Welt by author Karl Figdor, in early 1919. May produced The Mistress of the World as a serial film, which Carjels argues was more influenced by the French serials of the time rather than the American 'cliff-hanger' serials. Whereas the popular American serials were filmed over two reels, making them short openers to a feature film, each part of The Mistress of the World was shot over six reels, making them feature length. Another difference to the American serials was the lack of a cliffhanger ending. Each episode of Mistress was a self-contained story, but the end goal was still out of reach, drawing audiences back to find out how the story resolved rather than how the heroine escaped a dangerous situation.

Normal prerelease hype for serials was often manufactured through movie tie-ins, serialization in other media and spot prizes given to audience members. May attempted a different approach for The Mistress of the World, which at first appeared to be meager in comparison. He instead released a steady stream of information regarding the production of the film, which included stories around the film's stars, the set design and the process of making the film. This in turn led to massive audience anticipation, making The Mistress of the World one of the first Monumentalfilm, and this promotional technique was embraced by other productions that followed. May continued to feed the entertainment journals with facts from the film in the run up to its release, in an attempt to promote the enormity of the film: a 2,000 page script, 200 days of exterior filming and 150 days of interior filming. A set was created at Woltersdorf in Germany where a crew of 30,000 people fed by 100 cooks were utilised over the entire shoot and by the end of the production the film had cost six million Marks. This steady stream of figures resulted in the series being described as "a completely new film experience", and even without the story being unveiled May had given The Mistress of the World a feeling of importance and gravitas.

=== Cast and Crew ===
- For the lead role of Maud Gregaards, Joe May cast his wife Mia May.
- Michael Bohnen took the role of Consul Madsen, in parts I through IV.
- Henry Sze played Dr. Kien-Lung, as one of Gregaards' companions. Sze was one of the few successful non-white actors in early German cinema, and played a sympathetic hero in parts I through to IV.

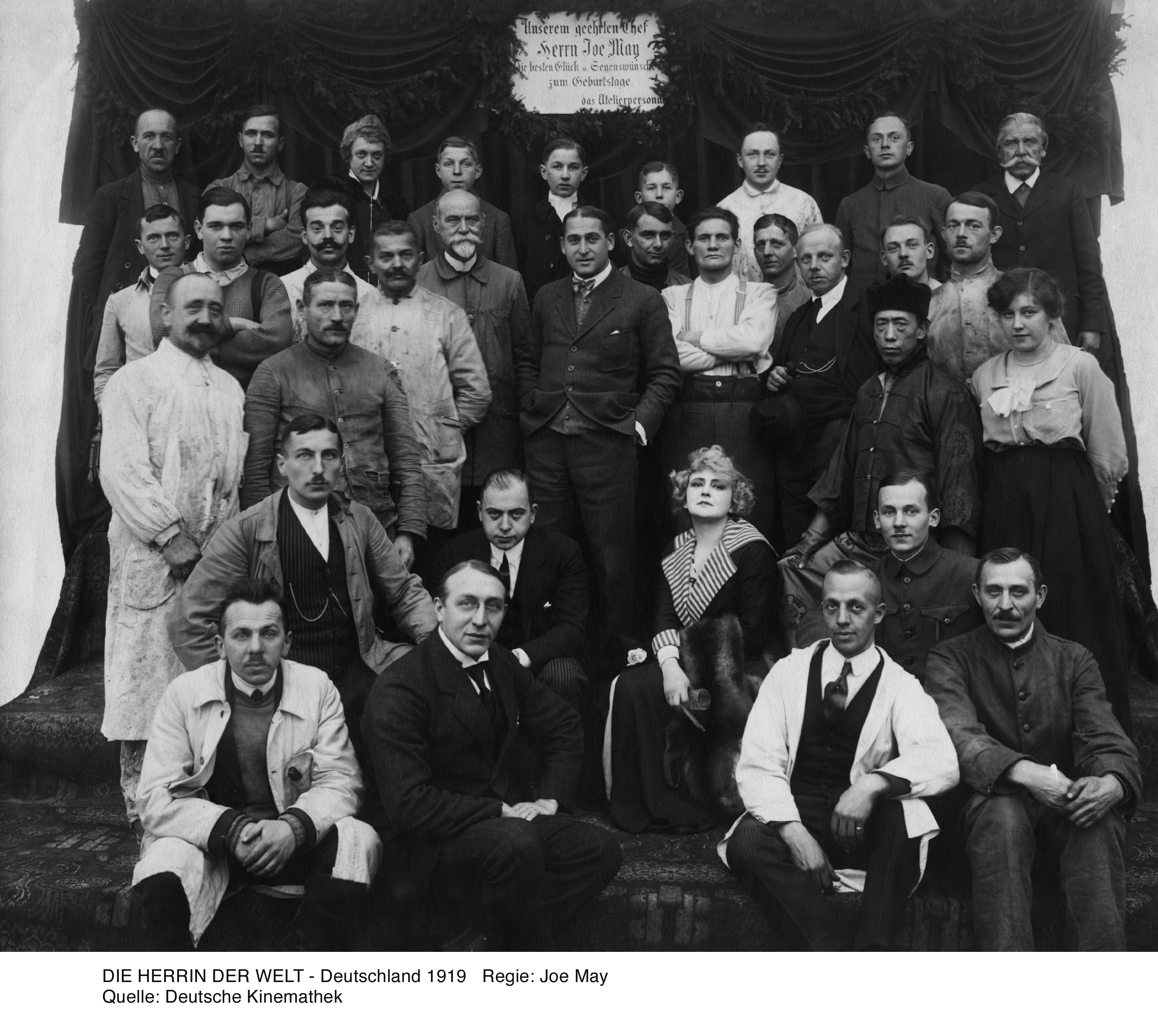
The cast and crew of The Mistress of the World in a promotional photo. Joe May is stood central

- Paul Hansen as Allen Stanley in parts V through to VII.
- Hans Mierendorff as the villainous Baron Murphy in parts I, II, IV, VII and VIII.
- Louis Brody as Simba the servant in parts I, V and VI and Mallkalle the Medicine Man in part IV.
- Ernst Hofmann as Credo Merville in part VIII.
- Rudolf Lettinger as Detective Hunt in part VIII.
- Wilhelm Diegelmann as Hannibal Harrison in part VI.
- Hermann Picha as Jonathan Fletcher in part VI.
- Paul Morgan as film maker Pius Gotthelf Karpeles in part VI.
- Victor Janson as Bullbox in parts V and VI

As well as starring many stars of Weimar cinema, The Mistress of the World is also notable for bringing together many of the most important writers and production and set designers of early German Expressionism. Of note in parts II and III, acting as assistant director, was Fritz Lang, who also acted as a script writer in part VIII. Working in the role of set and production design were Otto Hunte, Martin Jacoby-Boy, Erich Kettelhut and Karl Vollbrecht, all of whom would work in the years following with Lang on many of his iconic German films setting the tone of German Expressionist films in such classics as Dr. Mabuse the Gambler (1922), Die Nibelungen (1924) and Metropolis (1926).

== Reception ==
=== Europe ===
The first part of The Mistress of the World was premiered on 5 December 1919 at the Tauentzienpalast in Berlin, along with other high-end cinemas. The Tauentzienpalast was redecorated for the premier and the audience found themselves surrounded by tropical trees and bushes in an attempt to transport them to the exotic world of the film. Men dressed in Chinese servant uniforms handed out souvenirs, and large tapestries hung from the walls.

Initial reviews to the film were very positive. Die illustrierte Filmwoche noted how no other film had created such anticipation and disappointed so little. Die Kinematograph saw it as a masterpiece of German film-making skill, while Der Film believed that "it will win over foreign markets". The more independent cultural publications were less positive, Berliner Börsen-Courier wrote that the serial did not rise above the average feature and that it lacked a sense of greatness, strength and depth. George Gottholt, writing in the Freie Deutsche Bühne, was very negative in his views, stating "This film, and others like, it have a vulgarizing effect on the taste and a dumbing-down effect on the intellect of its audience." Carjels compares The Mistress of the World to a modern globe-trotting adventure story more akin to an Indiana Jones or Lara Croft film, rather than a more intellect take such as Madame Dubarry.

Although receiving mixed reviews, the public responded positively and The Mistress of the World was the most commercially successful German film of the 1919–1920 season, outstripping The Cabinet of Dr. Caligari (1920) in popular appeal.

=== United States ===
The Mistress of the World was released in the United States in 1922 by Paramount Pictures but was shortened and re-edited into four films, spanning twenty reels, the result of which was that half of the eight films were removed. The four films were titled: Number 1. The Dragon's Claw, Number 2. The Race for Life, Number 3. The City of Gold and Number 4. Saved by Wireless. According to Robert Kane, who oversaw the editing process for Paramount, it took four months to recut and give the film a more 'American Tempo'. The Paramount series only followed the events of the original story up until the end of part 5, not following the heroine's return to New York and her ultimate revenge.

Whereas the original series of films were intended to be a mix of adventure, melodrama and comedy, the American edit was created to concentrate on the action. This was reflected in the promotional campaign with 11 of the 13 posters offered to the exhibitors, showing fight scenes or daredevil acts, similar to those used in American serials.

== 1960 film ==
In 1960 CCC Films released a two part Mistress of the World feature film directed by William Dieterle starring Martha Hyer as Karin Fergusson.

== Bibliography ==
- Ashkenazi, Ofer (2012). Weimar Film and Modern Jewish Identity. Pelgrave Macmillan. p. 123. ISBN 9781137010841.
- Canjels, Rudmar (2011). Distributing Silent Film Serials: Local Practices, Changing Forms, Cultural Transformation. Routledge. ISBN 9781136837357.
- Halle, Randall; McCarthy, Margaret, eds. (2003). Light Motives: German Popular Film in Perspective. Wayne State University Press. ISBN 9780814330456.
