= I Had a Comrade =

1924 film

- German: Ich hatt' einen Kameraden
- Directed by: Hans Behrendt
- Written by: Hans Behrendt
- Produced by: Otto Gebühr
- Starring: Otto Gebühr
- Production company: Otto Gebühr-Film
- Release date: 1924
- Country: Germany
- Languages: Silent; German intertitles

I Had a Comrade (German:Ich hatt' einen Kameraden) is a 1924 German silent film directed by Hans Behrendt and starring Otto Gebühr.

== Cast ==
- Otto Gebühr
- Peter Berneis
- Gertrud Eysoldt
- Charlotte Klinder
