= The Good Comrade =

1923 film

- German: Ich hatt' einen Kameraden
- Directed by: Hans Felsing
- Written by: Hans Felsing
- Produced by: Hans Felsing
- Starring: Willy Kaiser-Heyl; Henri Peters-Arnolds; Margit Barnay
- Cinematography: Max Lutze
- Music by: Georg Enders
- Production company: Sing-Film
- Release date: 1923
- Country: Germany
- Languages: Silent; German intertitles

The Good Comrade (German: Ich hatt' einen Kameraden), or I Had a Comrade, is a 1923 German silent film directed by Hans Felsing and starring Willy Kaiser-Heyl, Henri Peters-Arnolds and Margit Barnay. It takes its title from a popular song.

== Cast ==
- Willy Kaiser-Heyl as Bürgermeister Ritter
- Henri Peters-Arnolds as Dr. Joachim Ritter
- Margit Barnay as Dorothee
- Albert Maurer as Student Wolf
- Fritz Alten as Kommandant Bruyère
- Georg John as Marodeur
- Franz Stephans as Marodeur
- Fritz Ruß as Amtsdiener
- Paul Rehkopf as Schuster Faber
