= Maria Peterson =

American politician

Member-elect of the Illinois House of Representatives from the 52nd district
- Assuming office January 2027
- Succeeding: Martin McLaughlin

Personal details
- Party: Democratic

Maria Peterson is an American politician. A member of the Democratic Party, she is the member-elect for the 52nd district of the Illinois House of Representatives.
