= Via Mala (disambiguation) =

Viamala is a section of the river Hinterrhein in Switzerland.

Via Mala may refer to:

- Via Mala (novel), a 1934 Swiss novel by John Knittel
- Via Mala (1945 film), a German film adaptation directed by Josef von Báky
- Via Mala (1961 film), a German film adaptation directed by Paul May
- Via Mala (TV series), a television adaptation

== See also ==
- Viamala Region, a region of the Canton of Graubünden
