= John Knittel =

Swiss writer (1891–1970)

John Knittel, originally Hermann Emanuel Knittel (March 24, 1891 in Dharwar, India – April 26, 1970 in Maienfeld, Graubünden) was a Swiss writer.

== Life ==
John Knittel was the son of a Württemberg missionary, Hermann Wilhelm Knittel, who was in the service of the Baseler Mission, along with his wife Ana née Schultze, was from the South Tyrol. Knittel was born in India, where his parents were engaged in missionary work. In 1895, the Knittels traveled with their children from India and returned to Switzerland and settled in Basel. John Knittel enrolled at the Gymnasium am Münsterplatz and was a schoolmate of Carl Jacob Burckhardt. He left the school and search for a vocational school in which to study and eventually became an apprentice in a cotton textile factory owned by an uncle.

=== Writing career ===
In 1908 he moved to London and worked as a bank teller for Crédit Lyonnais. He then worked as a projectionist in some theaters. In London, he met his future wife Frances White Mac Bridger, whom he married in 1915 against the will of her parents. This marriage produced three children.

A meeting with the English writer Robert Smythe Hichens in 1917 was the start of his life as a writer. Hichens recognized Knittel's talent and urged him to write in English. In 1919, his first novel appeared The Travels of Aaron West, which became a commercial success. In England, he became a member of P.E.N. Club.

=== Return to Switzerland and foreign travels ===
In 1921, Knittel settled in Switzerland with his wife, children and Hichens near Lake Geneva. In the following years, he took his family on his wide travels: Egypt, Algeria, Tunisia. In Egypt, he was impressed by Mohandas Karamchand Gandhi and supported a Schweizer Project dedicated to improving the life of poor fellaheen. The uncertain world political situation compelled the Knittels to return to Europe. In 1938 they began to live in the Haus Römersteig at the vineyards of Maienfeld in Graubünden.

=== World War II and its results ===
After the beginning of World War II, he visited Propaganda Minister Joseph Goebbels and with an introduction by Hans Carossa became a member of the Europäische Schriftsteller-Vereinigung (European Writers' League). In 1943 several friends of his daughter were sentenced to death for their participation in the anti-Nazi resistance group White Rose (Weiße Rose) - Willi Graf, Alexander Schmorell and Kurt Huber. He was denounced by his Swiss colleagues as a "Nazi Friend" (Nazifreund) and was expelled from the Schweizer Schriftsteller Verband (SSV).

Knittel died in his home in Maienfeld on April 26, 1970, at the age of 79

== Works ==
All works were written in English and the German translations were sold by his Swiss publisher without any indication as to the translators.

=== Novels and stories ===
- The Travels of Aaron West, Novel, 1919 (dt. Die Reisen des Aaron West / Kapitän West, 1922)
- A Traveller in the night, Novel, 1924 (dt. Der Weg durch die Nacht, 1926)
- Into the abyss, Roman, 1927 (dt. Thérèse Etienne, 1927)
- Nile Gold, Novel, 1929 (dt. Der blaue Basalt, 1929)
- Midnight People, Novel, 1930 (dt. Abd-el-Kader, 1930)
- Cyprus Wine, 1933 (no German translation)
- The Commander, Novel, 1933 (dt. Der Commandant, 1933)
- Via Mala, Novel, 1934 (dt. Via Mala, 1934)
- Dr. Ibrahim, Novel, 1935 (dt. El Hakim, 1936)
- The asp and other stories, Stories, 1936 (dt. Die Aspis-Schlange und andere Erzählungen, 1942)
- Power for sale, Novel, 1939 (dt. Amadeus, 1939; sequel of Thérèse Etienne in promotion of the Atlantropa project)
- Terra Magna, Novel, 1948
- Jean-Michel, Novel, 1953
- Arietta, Novel, 1957 (dt. Arietta. Marokkanische Episode, 1959)

=== Theater ===
- The Torch, drama, 1922
- High Finance, drama, 1934
- Protektorat. A Folkdrama from our ancient times, 1935 (Dramatization of Abd-el-Kader)
- Via Mala, drama, 1937
- Sokrates, drama, 1941
- La Rochelle, drama, 1943/44
- Thérèse Etienne, drama, 1950

== Filmography ==
- Hidden Lives (Netherlands, United Kingdom, 1920), directed by Maurits Binger and B. E. Doxat-Pratt
- Der Weg durch die Nacht (Germany, 1929), directed by Robert Dinesen, mit Margita Alfvén, Friedrich Ettel u.a.
- The Abyss Opens (Argentina, 1945), directed by Pierre Chenal, with Pablo Acciardi u.a.
- Via Mala (Germany, 1944/48), directed by Josef von Báky, mit Karin Hardt, Carl Wery, Albert Florath, Hilde Körber u.a.
- El Hakim (Germany, 1957), directed by Rolf Thiele, with O. W. Fischer, Michael Ande, Nadja Tiller, Charles Régnier u.a.
- Thérèse Étienne (France, 1958), directed by Denys de La Patellière, with James Robertson Justice, Françoise Arnoul u.a.
- Via Mala (Germany, 1961), directed by Paul May, with Gert Fröbe, Christine Kaufmann, Christian Wolff u.a.
- Via Mala (Germany, 1985, TV miniseries), directed by Tom Toelle, with Mario Adorf, Maruschka Detmers, Sissy Höfferer u.a.

== Bibliography ==
- Reto Carisch: Der Romancier John Knittel. Probleme, Strukturen und Leserpsychologische Hintergründe seiner Werke. Univ. Diss., Freiburg (Schweiz) 1972.
- Elisabeth Höhn-Gloor: John Knittel. Ein Erfolgsautor und sein Werk im Brennpunkt von Fakten und Fiktionen. Univ. Diss., Zürich 1984.
- Elisabeth Knöll: John Knittel. Univ. Diss., Wien 1950.
