= Comedy of the Heart =

1924 film

- Directed by: Rochus Gliese
- Written by: Sophie Hoechstetter (novella Maskenball des Herzens); F. W. Murnau; Rochus Gliese
- Produced by: Erich Pommer
- Starring: Lil Dagover; Nigel Barrie; Alexander Murski; Ruth Weyher
- Cinematography: Theodor Sparkuhl
- Music by: Giuseppe Becce
- Production company: PAGU
- Distributed by: Universum Film AG
- Release date: 30 September 1924
- Country: Germany
- Languages: Silent; German intertitles

Comedy of the Heart (German: Komödie des Herzens) is a 1924 German silent romance film directed by Rochus Gliese and starring Lil Dagover, Nigel Barrie and Alexander Murski. It premiered at the Tauentzienpalast in Berlin on 30 September 1924. It was based on a novella by Sophie Hoechstetter. The film was one of UFA's major releases of the 1923-1925 boom period. It was made at the Babelsberg Studio.

== Cast ==
- Lil Dagover as Gerda Werska
- Nigel Barrie as Baron Vinzenz
- Alexander Murski as Graf Inger auf Ingersholm
- Ruth Weyher as Inge
- Colette Brettel as Daisy
- Victor Palfi as Jurgen
- Ernst Winar as Knud
- Hans Cürlis as Herr Fips, Hauslehrer
- Lydia Potechina as Frau Ring
- William Huch
- Robert Leffler

== See also ==
- List of German films of 1924

== Bibliography ==
- Hardt, Ursula. From Caligari to California: Erich Pommer's life in the International Film Wars. Berghahn Books, 1996.
- Kreimeier, Klaus. The Ufa Story: A History of Germany's Greatest Film Company, 1918-1945. University of California Press, 1999.
