= Via Mala (TV series) =

1985 European television series

Via Mala is a 1985 television series, based on the 1934 novel Via Mala by John Knittel. It was made as a co-production between West Germany, France, Italy and Austria. The novel had previously been made into two films Via Mala (1945) and Via Mala (1961).

== Synopsis ==
Jonas Lauretz the owner of a sawmill in a village in Switzerland is a tyrannical person disliked by all his family and neighbours. When he is killed, almost everyone is suspected of murdering him before prime suspicion falls on his daughter.

== Partial cast ==
- Mario Adorf as Jonas Lauretz
- Maruschka Detmers as Silvie Lauretz
- Milena Vukotic as Sophie Lauretz
- Dominique Pinon as Niklaus Lauretz
- Hans Christian Blech as Maler Lauters
- Juraj Kukura as Andreas von Richenau
- Sissy Höfferer as Hanna Lauretz
- Fritz Eckhardt as Kreispräsident Bonatsch
- Jean-Paul Comart as Georg Gumpers
- Beppe Chierici as Jöry Wagner
- Jutta Maria Luser as Klara
- Ingrid Burkhard as Frau Gumpers
- Sylvie Granotier as Luise
- Eva Zilcher as Baronin von Richenau
- Georg Marischka as Dr. Gutknecht
- Robert Dietl as Baron von Richenau
- Bruno Dallansky as Schmid
- Siegfried Meisner as Wohl
- Hanno Pöschl as Wirt
- Bert Fortell as Lehmann
- Balthasar Burkhard as Zirreder

== Bibliography ==
- Goble, Alan. The Complete Index to Literary Sources in Film. Walter de Gruyter, 1999.
