= De kroon der schande =

1918 film

De Kroon der Schande
- Directed by: Maurits Binger
- Written by: Maurits Binger; Charles Garvice
- Produced by: Maurits Binger
- Starring: Willem van der Veer
- Cinematography: Feiko Boersma
- Release date: 1918
- Country: Netherlands
- Language: Silent

De Kroon der Schande is a 1918 Dutch silent drama film directed by Maurits Binger, and produced by the Hollandia company.

== Cast ==
- Willem van der Veer - De heer Newton
- Annie Bos - Jess Newton
- Adelqui Migliar - Bruce, Lord Ravenhurst
- Lola Cornero - Deborah Plunt
- Jan van Dommelen - Lord Ravenhurst
- Paula de Waart - Lady Ravenhurst
- Medardo Migliar - Hubert Clave
