= Laughter and Tears =

Laughter and Tears may refer to:

- Löjen och tårar, Laughter and Tears in English, a 1913 Swedish film directed by Victor Sjöström
- Laughter and Tears (1921 film), a 1921 Dutch film
