= Jan van der Horst =

Jan van der Horst may refer to:

- Jan van der Horst (cyclist) (born 1942), Dutch cyclist
- Jan van der Horst (rower) (born 1948), Dutch rower
- Jan van der Horst (actor), Dutch actor in Gloria transita and Moutarde van Sonansee
