= Oorlog en vrede =

- Directed by: Maurits Binger
- Written by: Maurits Binger; Adelqui Migliar
- Cinematography: Feiko Noersma
- Release date: 25 October 1918
- Country: Netherlands
- Language: Silent

Oorlog en vrede is a 1918 Dutch silent war drama film directed by Maurits Binger. It is named after the novel War and Peace by Leo Tolstoy, but is not an adaptation of it. It follows three families during World War I. Only a single fragment of the film survives.

== Cast ==
- Annie Bos - Any Godard
- Adelqui Migliar - Jean Laurent / Mario Laurent
- Paula de Waart - Pauline Laurent
- Lola Cornero - Ninette Laurent
- Caroline van Dommelen - Nora de Roqueville
- Jan van Dommelen - Robert de Roqueville
- Willem van der Veer - Gaston de Roqueville
- Minny Erfmann - Stella Marie
- Eberhard Erfmann - Frits
- Jan Buderman - Vader Godard
- Catharina Kinsbergen-Rentmeester - Moeder Godard
- Cor Smits - Hofman
- Heléne Wehman - Rosa Hofman
- Mimi Boesnach
- Jeanne Van der Pers
