= Het goudvischje =

1919 film

- Directed by: Maurits Binger
- Written by: Maurits Binger; Willem Gerard Nouhuys
- Produced by: Maurits Binger
- Cinematography: Feiko Boersma
- Release date: 12 July 1919
- Country: Netherlands
- Language: Silent

Het goudvischje is a 1919 Dutch silent drama film directed by Maurits Binger.

== Cast ==
- Annie Bos - Greta Rikkers
- Jeanne Van der Pers - Het Goudvischje
- Lily Bouwmeester - Greta's zuster
- Paula de Waart - Mevrouw Koorders
- Adelqui Migliar - Herman Koorders
- Jan van Dommelen - Oude heer Rikkers
- Fred Penley - Oude procuratiehouder
- Yard Van Staalduynen
- Renee Spiljar
