= Paula de Waart =

Dutch actress (1876–1938)

- Born: 1 January 1876; Vlissingen, Netherlands
- Died: 2 December 1938 (aged 62); The Hague, Netherlands
- Occupation: Actress
- Years active: 1915 - 1935

Paula de Waart (1 January 1876 – 2 December 1938) was a Dutch film actress of the silent era. She appeared in 24 films between 1915 and 1935.

== Filmography ==
- Het Mysterie van de Mondscheinsonate (1935)
- The Man in the Background (1922)
- De jantjes (1922)
- Schakels (1920)
- De damescoupeur (1919)
- Een Carmen van het Noorden (1919)
- Het goudvischje (1919)
- Amerikaansche meisjes (1918)
- Oorlog en vrede - 1918 (1918)
- Op hoop van zegen (1918)
- Oorlog en vrede - 1916 (1918)
- Oorlog en vrede - 1914 (1918)
- Toen 't licht verdween (1918)
- De kroon der schande (1918)
- Ulbo Garvema (1917)
- Gouden ketenen (1917)
- Madame Pinkette & Co (1917)
- Het geheim van Delft (1917)
- La renzoni (1916)
- Majoor Frans (1916)
- Liefdesoffer (1916)
- Vogelvrij (1916)
- Liefdesstrijd (1915)
- Koningin Elisabeth's dochter (1915)
