= Confetti (1927 film) =

1927 British film by Graham Cutts

- German poster
- Directed by: Graham Cutts
- Written by: Reginald Fogwell; Douglas Furber
- Starring: Jack Buchanan; Annette Benson; Sydney Fairbrother; Robin Irvine
- Cinematography: Roy F. Overbaugh
- Edited by: Norman Ellis
- Production company: First National-Pathé Pictures
- Distributed by: First National-Pathé Pictures
- Release date: December 1927
- Running time: 72 minutes
- Country: United Kingdom
- Languages: Silent Version (1927); Sound Version (1928); English Intertitles

Confetti is a 1927 British silent drama film directed by Graham Cutts and starring Jack Buchanan, Annette Benson and Sydney Fairbrother. A sound version was released in 1928. While the sound version had no audible dialog, it featured a synchronized musical score with sound effects using the sound-on-disc Vitaphone process. The silent version had its trade show exhibition in December 1927 which the sound version had its premiere in October 1928. The film was shot at Gainsborough Pictures' Islington studios.

== Cast ==
- Jack Buchanan as Count Andrea Zorro
- Annette Benson as Dolores
- Sydney Fairbrother as Duchess Maxine
- Robin Irvine as Carlo
- Andrée Sacré as Roxanne
- Georges Térof as Confetti Manufacturer

== Music ==
The sound version featured a theme song entitled "Confetti" which was composed by Douglas Furber and Emmett Adams.

== Bibliography ==
- Rachel Low, The History of British Film: Volume IV, 1918–1929 (Routledge, 1997)
