= Pages of Life (film) =

1922 film

- Directed by: Adelqui Migliar
- Written by: Adelqui Migliar
- Starring: Evelyn Brent
- Release date: November 1922
- Running time: Five reels
- Country: United Kingdom
- Language: Silent

Pages of Life is a 1922 silent British drama film directed by Adelqui Migliar and starring Evelyn Brent. The film is considered to be lost.

== Cast ==
- Evelyn Brent as Mitzi / Dolores
- Richard Turner as Valerius
- Jack Trevor as Lord Mainwaring
- Sunday Wilshin as Phyllis Mainwaring
