= The Little Hour of Peter Wells =

1921 film

- Directed by: Maurits Binger; B. E. Doxat-Pratt
- Written by: Eliot Stannard; David Whitelaw
- Production company: Anglo-Hollandia
- Release date: 21 January 1921
- Running time: 74 minutes
- Country: Netherlands
- Language: Silent

The Little Hour of Peter Wells (Dutch: De heldendaad van Peter Wells) is a 1921 Dutch silent film directed by Maurits Binger.

== Cast ==
- O. B. Clarence as Peter Wells
- Heather Thatcher as Camille Pablo
- Hebden Foster as Carlos Faroa
- Adelqui Migliar as Pranco
- Willem Hunsche as King Enrico
- Nico De Jong as Raoul Pablo
- Jan Kiveron as Faroa's lieutenant
- Fred Homann
