= Annette Benson =

British actress (1895–1965)

- Annette Benson in Confetti (1927)
- Born: 1895; London, United Kingdom
- Died: 1965 (aged 69–70); Santa Clara, California, U.S.
- Occupation: Actress
- Years active: 1921–1931 (film)

Annette Benson (1895–1965) was a British film actress. She was a leading lady of British silent films of the 1920s, appearing in Confetti with Jack Buchanan and Downhill with Ivor Novello. She also featured in several French and German productions in the mid-1920s. Her career tailed-off with the arrival of sound film and she made her last screen appearance in 1931.

Perhaps her best-known role is that of the film star Mae Feather in Anthony Asquith's Shooting Stars.

== Filmography ==
Year	Title	Role
1921	Love at the Wheel	Helen Warwick
1921	The Temporary Lady	Mary Lamb
1921	Squibs	Ivy Hopkins
1922	Three Live Ghosts	Mrs. Woofers
1922	The Nonentity	Beryl Danvers
1922	The Man from Home	Faustina Ribière
1922	Squibs Wins the Calcutta Sweep	Ivy Hopkins
1923	Afterglow	Mira Massingham
1923	The Harbour Lights	Lina Nelson
1924	Lovers in Araby	Nadine Meville
1924	The Money Habit	Diana Hastings
1925	A Daughter of Israel	Guitele
1925	Cock of the Roost	Olga
1925	Before the Battle	Alice de Corlaix
1926	The Cradle of God	Ruth
1927	Downhill	Mabel
1927	Confetti	Dolores
1928	Madonna of the Sleeping Cars	
1928	Shooting Stars	Mae Feather
1928	A South Sea Bubble	Lydia la Rue
1928	Change of Heart	Griselda Turner
1928	Sir or Madam	Lady Day
1928	The Ringer	Cora Ann Milton
1928	The Inseparables	Adrienne
1929	Weekend Wives	Helene Monard
1931	Deadlock	Madeleine d'Arblay
1931	Almost a Divorce	

== Bibliography ==
- Ryall, Tom. Anthony Asquith. Oxford University Press, 2013.
