= Paragraph 182 =

1927 film

- Directed by: Ernst Winar
- Written by: Alexander Bela
- Starring: Colette Brettel; Gerhard Ritterband; Eva Speyer
- Cinematography: Otto Tober
- Production companies: Filmproduktion Loew & Co.
- Release date: 1 November 1927
- Country: Germany
- Languages: Silent; German intertitles

Paragraph 182 (German:§ 182 minderjährig) is a 1927 German silent drama film directed by Ernst Winar and starring Colette Brettel, Gerhard Ritterband and Eva Speyer.

The film's sets were designed by the art director Mathieu Oostermann.

== Cast ==
- Colette Brettel
- Gerhard Ritterband
- Eva Speyer
- Albert Steinrück

== Bibliography ==
- Grange, William. Cultural Chronicle of the Weimar Republic. Scarecrow Press, 2008.
