= Fate's Plaything =

1920 film

- Directed by: Maurits Binger; B. E. Doxat-Pratt
- Written by: C. F. Harding; Reginald Lawson
- Produced by: Maurits Binger
- Release date: 11 May 1920
- Countries: Netherlands; United Kingdom
- Language: Silent

Fate's Plaything (Dutch: Wat eeuwig blijft) is a 1920 Dutch-British silent drama film directed by Maurits Binger.

== Cast ==
- Reginald Barton - Stephen Adams
- Constance Worth - Dolores Blockett
- Bruce Gordon - Dr. Lucas Murray
- Adelqui Migliar - Hugo Amadis
- Frank Dane - Charles Blackett
- Hector Abbas - Quentin Sylvester
- Henry Scofield - Blackett
- Harry Waghalter - Fane
- Henny Van Merle - Joyce Blackett
- Norman Doxat-Pratt - Peter
- Gwen Tremayne - Dolores als kind
- Fred Homann - Dokter
- Marie Spiljar
- Leni Marcus
- Frans Bogaert
