= Everything in Life =

1936 film

- Directed by: J. Elder Wills
- Written by: John E. Lewis; Courtney Terrett
- Produced by: George Loftus; Ronald H. Riley
- Starring: Gitta Alpar; Neil Hamilton; Lawrence Grossmith; Gerald Barry
- Cinematography: Jan Stallich
- Edited by: Vladimir Sagovsky
- Music by: Hans May
- Production company: Tudor Films
- Distributed by: Columbia Pictures
- Release date: November 1936
- Running time: 70 minutes
- Country: United Kingdom
- Language: English

Everything in Life (also known as Because of Love) is a 1936 British musical film directed by J. Elder Wills and starring Gitta Alpar, Neil Hamilton and Lawrence Grossmith. It was written by John E. Lewis and Courtney Terrett, and made at Highbury Studios.

== Synopsis ==
An opera singer pretends to be poor in order to romantically win over a composer.

== Cast ==
- Gitta Alpar as Rita Bonya
- Neil Hamilton as Geoffrey Loring
- Lawrence Grossmith as Lewis Radford
- H. F. Maltby as Sir Algernon Spindle
- Gerald Barry as Vere Ponsonby
- Dorothy Boyd as Miss Winstone
- Wyn Weaver as William Tewkes
- Clarissa Selwynne as Matilda Tewkes
- Bruce Winston as Franz Graumann
- Vera Bogetti as Carolyn Dexter
- John Deverell as John

== Reception ==
Kine Weekly wrote: "Artless romantic musical confection, a simple story lightly turning upon the tantrums of temperamental opera star. Neither the script, the character-drawing or the direction is particular bright, but fortunately, Gitta Alpar, the big noise of the production, is in good voice and she, aided by popular musical scores specially composed by Hans May and sympathetically rendered by the London Symphony Orchestra, manages to inject just enough tuneful popular melody into the airy entertainment to get it over with other than hard-boiled industrial audiences."

The Monthly Film Bulletin wrote: "The weak incoherent story is only redeemed from yawning tedium by Gitta Alpar's singing. Her splendid high soprano voice records well. But neither camera, clothes, nor make-up are kind to her, nor do the melodies give her much scope. Neil Hamilton, as the composer, struggles to brighten his part with some would-be amusing gags."
