= Keepers of Youth =

1932 film directed by Thomas Bentley

- Promotional picture featuring Garry Marsh.
- Directed by: Thomas Bentley
- Written by: Walter C. Mycroft; Frank Launder; Thomas Bentley
- Based on: Keepers of Youth by Arnold Ridley
- Produced by: John Maxwell
- Starring: Garry Marsh; Ann Todd; Robin Irvine; John Turnbull
- Cinematography: James Wilson
- Production company: British International Pictures
- Distributed by: Wardour Films
- Release date: 25 January 1932
- Running time: 70 minutes
- Country: United Kingdom
- Language: English

Keepers of Youth is a 1932 British drama film directed by Thomas Bentley and starring Garry Marsh, Ann Todd and Robin Irvine. It was written by Walter C. Mycroft, Frank Launder and Bentley based on the 1929 play Keepers of Youth by Arnold Ridley, and marked the film debut of Ann Todd. It was shot at the Elstree Studios of British International Pictures.

== Preservation status ==
The British Film Institute National Archive holds a collection of ephemera and stills but no film or video materials.

== Plot ==
The arrival of Mr. Knox, the new sports instructor at a British public school, heralds trouble. He imposes his dominant personality to influence colleagues and the headmaster alike, and then attempts to force himself on Millicent, the assistant matron.

== Cast ==
- Garry Marsh as Knox
- Ann Todd as Millicent
- Robin Irvine as David Lake
- John Turnbull as Gordon Duff
- O. B. Clarence as Slade
- Herbert Ross as Sullivan
- Mary Clare as Mrs Venner
- Ethel Warwick as Matron
- Rene Ray as Kitty Williams

== Release ==
The film was banned in Australia as "an unwholesome school story."

== Reception ==
Kine Weekly wrote: "This drama, an exposure of the English preparatory school system, unquestionably has a good deal of truth behind it, but is at times a little unsavory, and does not put the scholastic profession in a very favorable light. Still, it certainly entertains, thanks principally to a robust characterisation by Garry Marsh as a bullying sports master, and the efficiency of the supporting players. Quite a good atmosphere prevails, and the technical work is satisfactory."

Film Weekly wrote: "The story of Keepers of Youth is very strong meat. It is effectively told and brilliantly acted."
