= Sparrows (1916 film) =

- Directed by: Maurits Binger
- Written by: Victor Bridges (scenario), Horace W. Newte (book)
- Release date: 31 March 1916
- Running time: 70 minutes
- Country: Netherlands
- Language: Silent

Sparrows (Dutch: Vogelvrij) is a 1916 Dutch silent drama film directed by Maurits Binger.

== Cast ==
- Annie Bos ... Mavis Keeves
- Lola Cornero ... Victoria Davitt
- Pierre Perin ... Harry Winderbank jr.
- Paula de Waart ... Buurvrouw van Mavis
- Fred Penley
- Max Leeds ... Charlie Percival
- Willem van der Veer
- Alex Benno
