= Toen 't licht verdween =

- Directed by: Maurits Binger
- Written by: Maurits Binger; A. W. G. van Riemsdijk
- Produced by: Maurits Binger
- Release date: 8 July 1918
- Running time: 90 minutes
- Country: Netherlands
- Language: Silent

Toen 't licht verdween is a 1918 Dutch silent drama film directed by Maurits Binger.

== Cast ==
- Annie Bos - Sylvia
- Adelqui Migliar - Pietro Cignoni
- Lola Cornero - Lyda
- Jan van Dommelen - Gio Romano
- Cor Smits - Professor in de oogheelkunde
- Frits Bouwmeester - Rosni (as Frits Bouwmeester jr.)
- Paula de Waart - Rosni's moeder
- Renee Spiljar - Renée
- Marie Spiljar - Renée's kindermeisje
- Ernst Winar
