= Above Rubies =

1932 film

- John Deverell in the film
- Directed by: Frank Richardson
- Written by: Douglas Hoare; Eliot Stannard
- Produced by: Ralph J. Pugh
- Starring: Zoe Palmer; Robin Irvine; Tom Helmore
- Cinematography: Geoffrey Faithfull
- Production company: Ralph J. Pugh Productions
- Distributed by: United Artists
- Release date: 11 July 1932
- Running time: 43 minutes
- Country: United Kingdom
- Language: English

Above Rubies is a 1932 British comedy film directed by Frank Richardson and starring Zoe Palmer, Robin Irvine and Tom Helmore. It was written by Douglas Hoare and Eliot Stannard and made at Walton Studios as a quota quickie for release by United Artists.

== Preservation status ==
The British Film Institute National Archive holds no stills or ephemera, and no film or video materials.

== Plot ==
Lady Wellingford borrows £1,000 from Monsieur Dupont, a Monte Carlo jeweller, using her necklace as security. When she is unable to reclaim the necklace on the agreed day, Dupont decides to keep it. Lady Wellingford's daughter Joan, and her three suitors Paul, Philip and Lord Richard, hatch a clever plan to force Dupont to hand over the necklace.

== Cast ==
- Zoe Palmer as Joan Wellingford
- Robin Irvine as Philip
- Tom Helmore as Paul
- John Deverell as Lord Middlehurst
- Franklyn Bellamy as Dupont
- Allan Jeayes as Lamont
- Madge Snell as Lady Wellingford

== Reception ==
Film Weekly wrote: "An indifferent mixture of fivolous farce and crude slapstick is all that Above Rubies has to offer you. The acting is just passable, but the direction is loose and haphazard. This, applied to a naïve and incredible story, certainly does not make for good entertainment."

Kine Weekly wrote: "Frivolous farcical comedy, the story of which, although not exactly new, leads to a few bright situations. The technique and team work are fairly good, and the production qualities satisfactory. ... A little ingenuity creeps into the plot, and it works out well, considering that the producer, for economic reasons, is restricted in scope."

The Daily Film Renter wrote: "The dialogue though humorous at times, is neither subtle nor scintillating, details not likely to worry the patron of popular halls, who will probably laugh at the appointed places and enjoy the heaped discomfiture of the wicked Dupont. As light farcical entertainment the film should be acceptable to popular halls."
