= Robin Irvine =

British actor (1901–1933)

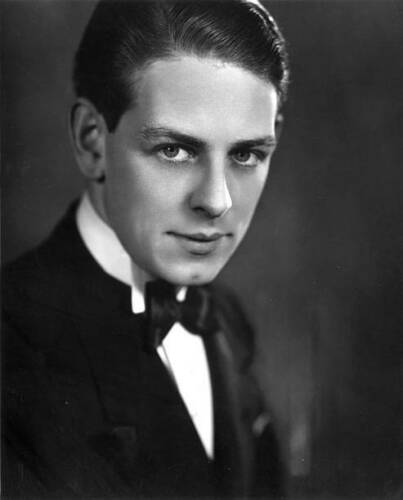

Robin Irvine (21 December 1901, in Stoke Newington, London, England – 28 April 1933, in Bermuda) was a British film actor. He was married to actress Ursula Jeans from 1931 until his death from pleurisy aged 31.

== Filmography ==
- The Secret Kingdom (1925)
- Downhill (1927)
- Land of Hope and Glory (1927)
- Confetti (1928)
- Easy Virtue (1928)
- Palais de danse (1928)
- The Rising Generation (1928)
- The Intruder (1928) – short
- Young Woodley (1928)
- A Knight in London (1929)
- Come Back, All Is Forgiven (1929)
- The Ship of Lost Souls (1929)
- Mischievous Miss (1930)
- Leave It to Me (1930)
- Keepers of Youth (1931)
- Above Rubies (1932)
