= Was She Guilty? =

1922 film

- Directed by: George Beranger
- Distributed by: Hollandia
- Release date: August 1922
- Running time: 65 minutes
- Countries: United Kingdom; Netherlands
- Language: Silent

Was She Guilty? (Dutch: Gij zult niet dooden) (1922) is a British-Dutch silent crime film directed by George Beranger. It is also known by the alternative title of Thou Shalt Not.

== Cast ==
- Gertrude McCoy as Ruth Herwood
- Zoe Palmer as Mary (17 years)
- Louis Willoughby as George Midhurst, lawyer
- William Freshman as Bobby (19 years)
- Pierre Balledux as Ling Soo
- Paul de Groot as John Herwood
- Norman Doxat-Pratt as Bobby (5 years)
- Fred Homann
- Kitty Kluppell as Palmyra Hawks
- Joan Midwinter as Mary (3 years)
- Mari van Warmelo as The Parson
