= American Girls (film) =

1918 film

- Directed by: Maurits Binger; Louis Davids
- Written by: Maurits Binger; Louis Davids
- Produced by: Maurits Binger
- Release date: 4 November 1918
- Country: Netherlands
- Language: Silent

American Girls (Dutch: Amerikaansche meisjes) is a 1918 Dutch silent drama film directed by Maurits Binger.

== Plot ==
Beppie, Margie, and Lola are the three daughters of millionaire Brown. Accompanied by their art teacher Polly, they take a trip to Amsterdam, where all three fall for the charms of operetta tenor Adelqui, the lover of the famous film star Anny. They make a bet to see who can be the first to break up Adelqui and Anny’s relationship so they can pursue him themselves. The three women enlist the help of the same detective to appear as confident as possible. However, he is not home when they visit him. Tinus, the detective’s valet, decides to fill in for his boss and helps the ladies.

Once the girls are ready, they agree that they have four weeks to win Adelqui over. Beppie is chosen as the first woman to make her move. She manages to impress him, but ruins her chances at a dinner party. Next, it’s Lola’s turn. She joins an operetta troupe to get closer to Adelqui. Just like her predecessor, Lola ultimately fails. All hope is pinned on Margie. Margie goes to a party at the Café de Paris to seduce Adelqui. Although she faces stiff competition from other young women, she manages to capture his attention. It seems they’re about to become a couple, until an American man enters the picture and ruins her chances.

== Cast ==
- Lola Cornero - Lola
- Beppie De Vries - Beppie
- Margie Morris - Margie
- Adelqui Migliar - Adelqui
- Annie Bos - Anny
- Jan van Dommelen - Jan Dommel
- Louis Davids - Tinus / Various Roles
- Cor Smits - Miljonair Brown
- Paula de Waart - Polly Dewar
- Marcello Lanfredi
- Max van Gelder - Man theaterbureau
