= John Deverell =

British actor (1880–1965)

John Deverell (30 May 1880 in London, England – 2 March 1965 in Haywards Heath, Sussex, England) was a British actor.

== Selected filmography ==
- John Forrest Finds Himself (1920) – The Hon. Vere Blair
- Children of Chance (1930) – Harold
- Alibi (1931) – Lord Halliford
- A Night in Montmartre (1932) – cast member
- Monte Carlo Madness (1932) – Consul
- Above Rubies (1932) – Lord Middlehurst
- The Path of Glory (1934) – Paul
- The King of Paris (1934) – Bertrand
- The Divine Spark (1935) – the King
- Marry the Girl (1935) – Judge
- They Didn't Know (1936) – Lord Budmarsh
- Get off My Foot (1936) – cast member
- Because of Love (original title-Everything in Life) (1936) – John
- The Girl in the Taxi (1937) – Emile Pomerell
- The Street Singer (1937) – James the butler
- Incident in Shanghai (1938) – Weepie
- I've Got a Horse (1938) – Judge
- Larry the Lamb (1947 TV Movie) – The Inventor
- The Calendar (1948) – rector
- The Cruise of the Toytown Belle (1950)- The Inventor
- At Your Service, Ltd. (1951-TV Series) – Captain Crowe's Treasure – Justin Crowe
- Many Moons (1953 TV Short) – Royal Physician
- Thames Tug (1953 TV Series) – Ebb & Flow (Dr. Spurgeon), Uncle John Enjoys a Joke (Dr. Spurgeon), The Gent and the Joker (Dr. Spurgeon)
- BBC Sunday-Night Theatre – (1950–1959 TV Series) The Perfect Woman (1956) – Prof. Archibald Belmon
