= Helen Prothero-Lewis =

Welsh writer (1853–1946)

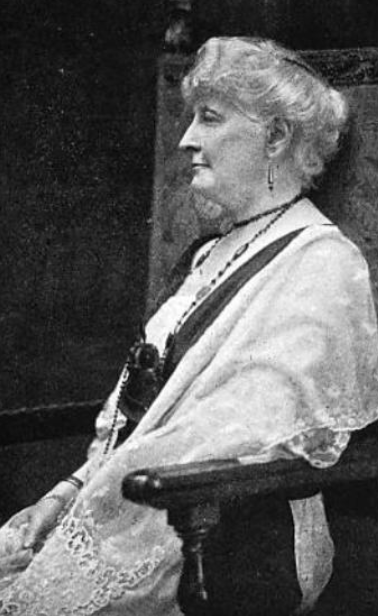
- Helen Prothero-Lewis, from a 1925 publication
- Born: 15 June 1853; Llandeilo, Carmarthenshire, Wales
- Died: 7 August 1946 (age 93); Llandeilo, Carmarthenshire, Wales
- Other names: Helen Prothero Pugh
- Occupation: Writer

Helen Prothero-Lewis (15 June 1853 – 7 August 1946) was a Welsh writer.

== Early life and education ==
Prothero-Lewis was born in Llandeilo, Carmarthenshire, the daughter of solicitor John Prothero Lewis and Frances Elizabeth Shipley Lewis. Her brother R. Shipley Lewis was also a solicitor in Llandeilo.

== Career ==
Prothero-Lewis wrote twenty-one novels, mostly romances set in Wales, between 1890 and 1928. She also wrote short stories and poems for periodicals including The Girl's Own Paper. Three of her novels were adapted into silent films: As God Made Her (1920), The Silver Bridge (1920), and Love and the Whirlwind (1922).

Prothero-Lewis was considered a reliable and talented novelist in her genre. "Sometimes there are sentences, bits of description, in the romances of the country-side, which make one think that, had she been less normal, less conventional, the authoress might have written something in the vein of Wuthering Heights," wrote Mary Webb in The Bookman in 1925, pointing to some "macabre touches" and "two dark, wild brothers" in The Hills Beyond.

== Publications ==
- "The Vail of Llangollen" (poem, 1886, The Red Dragon)
- "An Unhappy Bachelor" (story 1890, The Girl's Own Paper)
- Her Heart's Desire (1890)
- A Lady of My Own (1891)
- Hooks of Steel (1894)
- Thraldom (1903)
- Tobias and the Angel (1906)
- The Unguarded Taper (1906)
- "A Happy Chance" (story, 1906, The Girl's Own Paper)
- "What the Wind Did" (story, 1907, The Girl's Own Paper)
- "His Own Particular Rose" (story, 1908, The Girl's Own Paper)
- Adventures of Armine de Lancy (1910)
- The Silent Shore (1921)
- The Hills Beyond (1925)
- Like Any Other Man (1923)
- The Heart of the Offender (1924)
- A Woman in the Making (1926)
- Henrietta (1928)

== Personal life ==
Prothero-Lewis married solicitor James Jacob George Pugh in 1895, and the couple lived in Twickenham. Her husband died in 1904, and she died in 1946, at the age of 93, in Llandeilo, a few weeks after her last surviving sibling, Agnes.
