= La renzoni =

- Directed by: Maurits Binger
- Written by: Marie Sloot
- Release date: 8 September 1916
- Country: Netherlands
- Language: Silent

La renzoni is a 1916 Dutch silent drama film directed by Maurits Binger.

== Cast ==
- Annie Bos - Alda
- Willem van der Veer - Alda's man / Alda's husband
- Paula de Waart - Mevr. van Ingen / Mrs. van Ingen
- Jan van Dommelen - Henri de Jager
- Nico De Jong - Prins / Prince
- Lola Cornero
- Renee Spiljar - Eén van Alda's kinderen / one of Alda's children (as Renée Spilar)
- Ernst Winar
- Jack Hamel
