= Adelqui Migliar =

Chilean actor and filmmaker

Adelqui Migliar Icardi
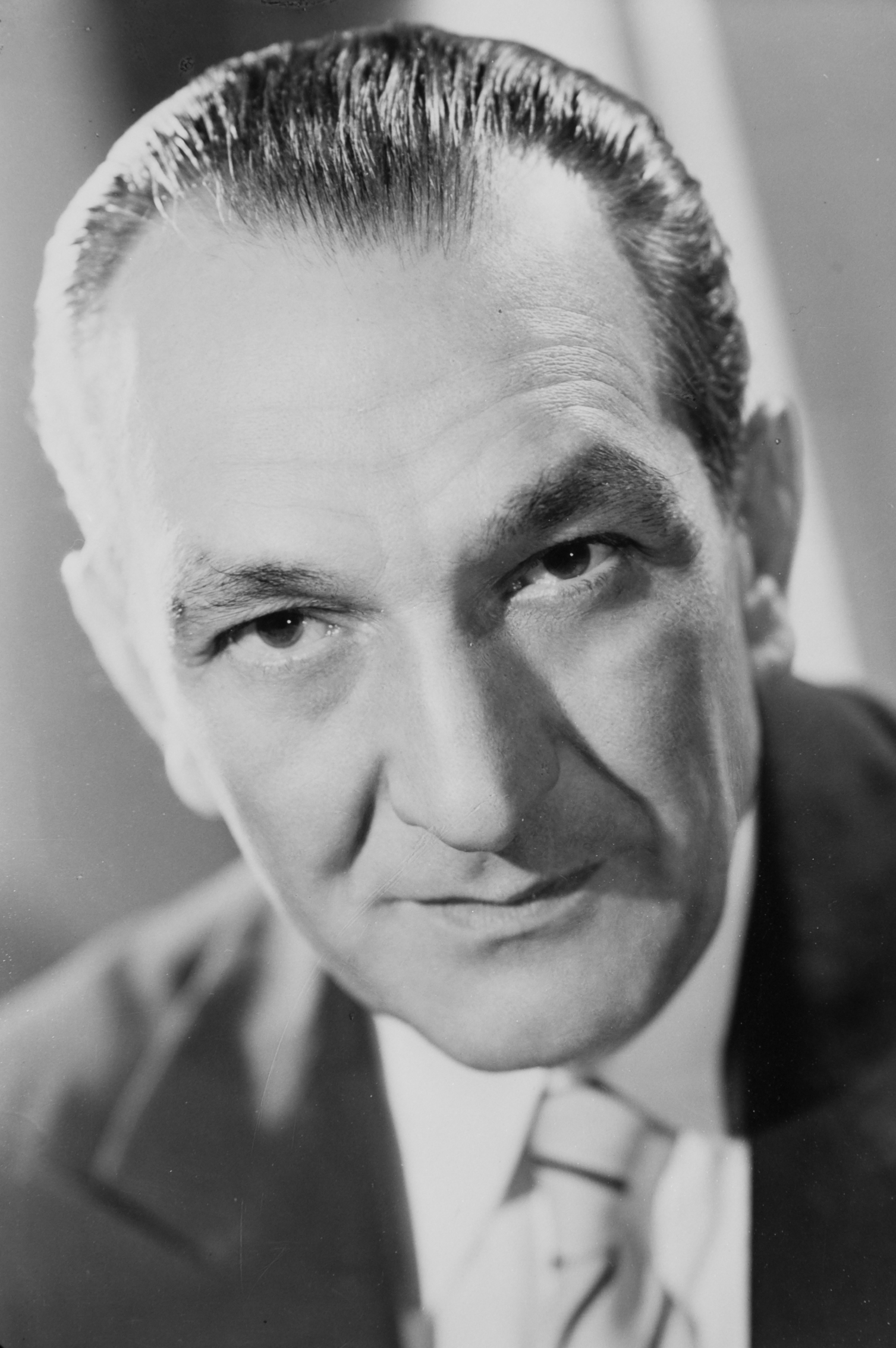
- Adelqui Migliar
- Born: 5 August 1891; Concepción, Chile
- Died: 6 August 1956 (aged 65); Santiago, Chile
- Other name: Adelqui Millar
- Occupations: Actor, film director, screenwriter, film producer
- Years active: 1916-1954

Adelqui Migliar (5 August 1891 – 6 August 1956), also known as Adelqui Millar, was a Chilean film actor, director, writer and producer. He appeared in 31 silent films between 1916 and 1928. He also directed 24 films between 1922 and 1954. He was born in Concepción, Chile, and lived and worked in the Netherlands, the United Kingdom and the United States. He died in Santiago, Chile.

== Selected filmography ==
- Een danstragedie (1916)
- Genie tegen geweld (1916)
- Madame Pinkette & Co (1917)
- Toen 't licht verdween (1918)
- American Girls (1918)
- De kroon der schande (1918)
- Oorlog en vrede (1918)
- Zonnetje (1919)
- A Carmen of the North (1919)
- Het goudvischje (1919)
- John Heriot's Wife (1920)
- Fate's Plaything (1920)
- As God Made Her (1920)
- Hidden Lives (1920)
- Schakels (1920, lost)
- The Little Hour of Peter Wells (1921)
- Laughter and Tears (1921)
- Blood Money (1921)
- The Other Person (1921)
- Rechten der jeugd (1921)
- In the Night (1922)
- De leugen van Pierrot (1922)
- Pages of Life (1922)
- I Pagliacci (1923)
- Die Sklavenkönigin (1924; actor)
- London (1926; actor)
- Life (1928)
- Baccarat (1929)
- The Inseparables (1929)
- The Rebel (1931)
- The Lights of Buenos Aires (1931; director)
- Ambición (1939)
- Only the Valiant (1940; director)
