= Sister Brown =

1921 film

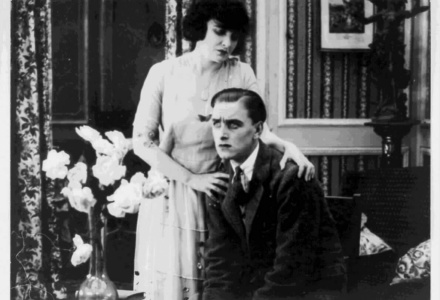
- Still from Sister Brown
- Directed by: Maurits Binger; B. E. Doxat-Pratt
- Written by: Maurits Binger
- Release date: 1921
- Country: Netherlands
- Language: Silent

Sister Brown (Dutch: Zuster Brown) is a 1921 Dutch silent film directed by Maurits Binger.

== Cast ==
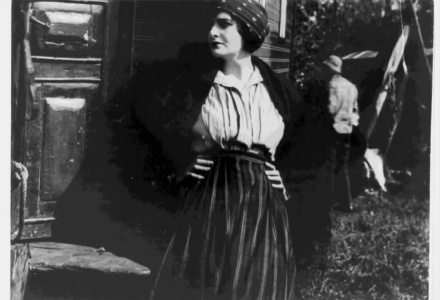
Still from Sister Brown directed by Maurits Binger

- Marjorie Villis - Joyce Sinclair, zuster Brown
- Rolf Leslie
- Harold French - Roy Chertsey
- Reginald Barton - Vincent Ferguson, dokter
- Louis Chrispijn Jr. - Henry Ferguson
- Willem Hunsche - Priester
- Mien Schmidt Crans - Roy's moeder
- Norman Doxat-Pratt - Robinsons jongere zoon
- Jack Doxat-Pratt - Robinsons oudere zoon
- Elsie Cohen - Zigeunerin (Gypsy)
- Renee Spiljar - Enid
- Marie Spiljar
- Leni Marcus
- Carl Tobi
- Fred Homann
