= Colette Brettel =

British actress (1902–1973)

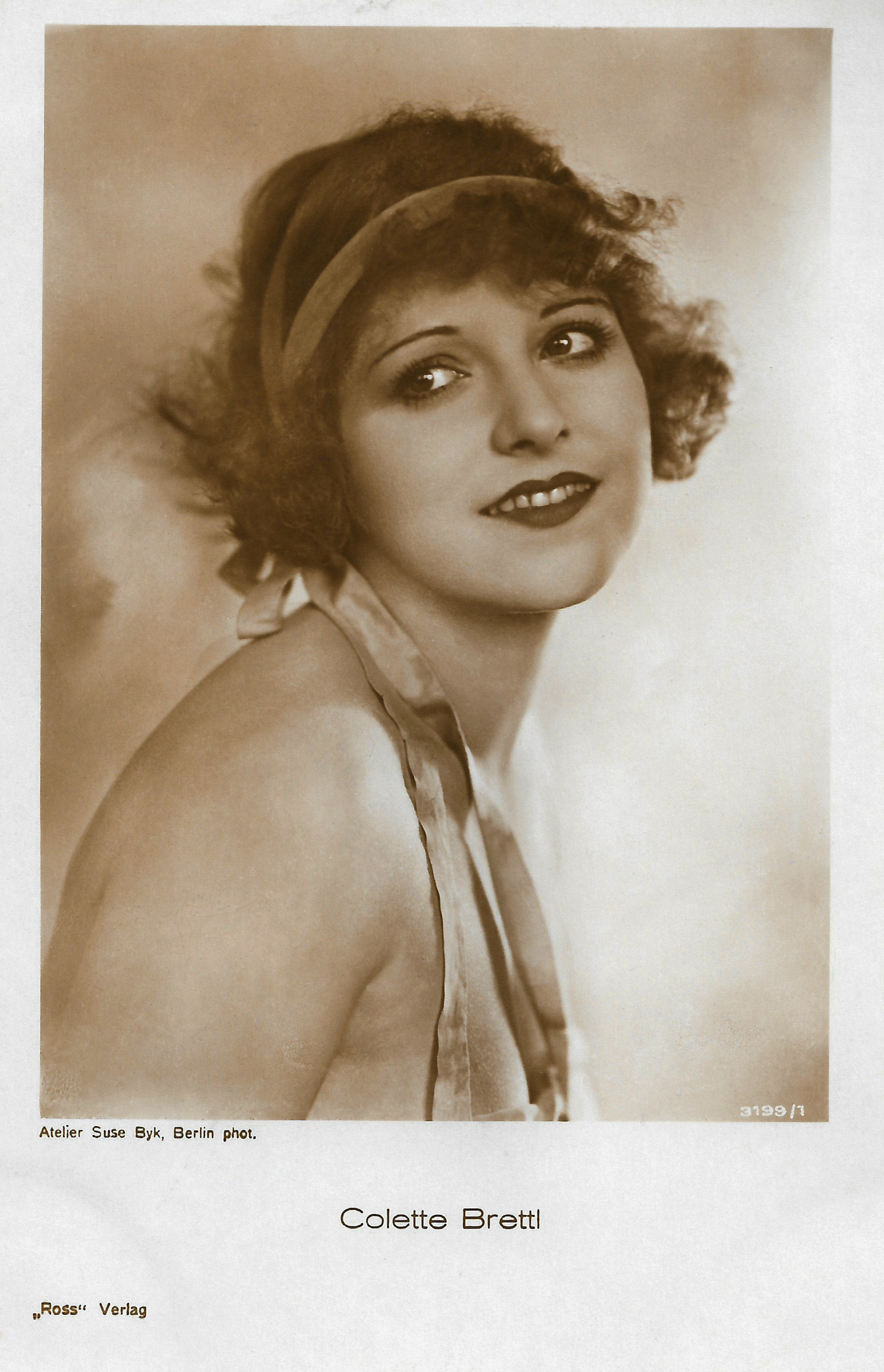
- Born: 1 June 1902; London, England; United Kingdom
- Died: 1973 (aged 70–71); Sheffield, Yorkshire, United Kingdom
- Other name: Dorothy Nicolette Pettigrew
- Occupation: Actress
- Years active: 1920–1929 (film)
- Spouse: Ernst Winar

Colette Brettel (1902–1973) was a British stage and film actress. Born Dorothy Nicolette Pettigrew in London to the unmarried couple of Hetty Pettigrew and Theodore Roussel, she made her screen debut in the 1920 film Wuthering Heights and appeared in several British films of the early 1920s including The Prodigal Son. Following the Slump of 1924, in which the number of British films released sharply declined, she moved to Germany. She starred in the film The Imaginary Baron (1927) with Marlene Dietrich. Her film career ended with the introduction of sound.

She was married to the Dutch actor Ernst Winar.

== Selected filmography ==
- Wuthering Heights (1920)
- The Harper's Mystery (1921)
- Blood Money (1921)
- The Prodigal Son (1923)
- The Wheels of Destiny (1923)
- The Colleen Bawn (1924)
- Comedy of the Heart (1924)
- Countess Maritza (1925)
- The Golden Calf (1925)
- The Proud Silence (1925)
- The Company Worth Millions (1925)
- Why Get a Divorce? (1926)
- Watch on the Rhine (1926)
- The Sea Cadet (1926)
- Annemarie and Her Cavalryman (1926)
- We Belong to the Imperial-Royal Infantry Regiment (1926)
- The Imaginary Baron (1927)
- Paragraph 182 (1927)
- The Family without Morals (1927)
- A Modern Casanova (1928)
- A Love, A Thief, A Department Store (1928)
- The Harbour Baron (1928)
- What a Woman Dreams of in Springtime (1929)
- They May Not Marry (1929)

== Bibliography ==
- Oakley, Charles. Where We Came In: Seventy Years of the British Film Industry. Routledge, 2013.
