= Land of Hope and Glory (film) =

1927 film

- Directed by: Harley Knoles
- Written by: Adrian Brunel; Valentine Williams
- Produced by: G.B. Samuelson; Samuel W. Smith
- Starring: Ellaline Terriss; Lyn Harding; Robin Irvine; Enid Stamp-Taylor
- Cinematography: René Guissart
- Production company: Gloria Films
- Distributed by: British Lion Film Corporation
- Release date: November 1927
- Running time: 8,700
- Country: United Kingdom
- Language: English

Land of Hope and Glory is a 1927 British silent drama film directed by Harley Knoles and starring Ellaline Terriss, Lyn Harding and Robin Irvine. It was inspired by Edward Elgar's 1902 song Land of Hope and Glory.

== Cast ==
- Ellaline Terriss as Mrs Whiteford
- Lyn Harding as Roger Whiteford
- Robin Irvine as Ben Whiteford
- Ruby Miller as Myra Almazov
- Enid Stamp-Taylor as Jane
- Arthur Pusey as Matt Whiteford
- Henry Vibart as Sir John Maxeter
- Lewin Mannering as Boris Snide
- Kenneth McLaglen as Stan Whiteford

== Bibliography ==
- Low, Rachael. History of the British Film, 1918-1929. George Allen & Unwin, 1971.
