= Ulbo Garvema =

- Directed by: Maurits Binger
- Written by: Ernest Scheidius
- Release date: 2 November 1917
- Country: Netherlands
- Language: Silent

Ulbo Garvema is a 1917 Dutch silent film directed by Maurits Binger

== Cast ==
- Frederick Vogeding - Baron van Walden / Alfred
- Cor Smits - Jan van Oort
- Annie Bos - Jan van Oort's dochter / Jonge Anna
- Jan van Dommelen - Hendrik
- Antoinette Sohns - Gravin
- Paula de Waart - Jan van Oort's vrouw
- Lily Bouwmeester - Anna als kind
- Pierre Perin - Anna's verloofde
- Lola Cornero - Meid
- Fred Homann - Dokter
- Ernst Winar
