= De damescoupeur =

1919 film

- Directed by: Maurits Binger
- Written by: Hans Nesna
- Produced by: Maurits Binger
- Release date: 31 October 1919
- Country: Netherlands
- Language: Silent

De damescoupeur is a 1919 Dutch silent comedy film directed by Maurits Binger.

== Plot ==
Jacques is a tailor and has had feelings for Polly, the cashier, for years. Just when she is finally willing to marry him, he falls in love with Lily, his employer’s daughter and a typical young lady who refuses to associate with anyone from a lower social class. One day, he wins 100,000 guilders in the lottery. The landlady fears he will no longer want to work for her and, just before he learns of his newfound wealth, has him sign a contract binding him to her staff for a long time. He eventually works his way up to become the company’s director and wins Lily’s heart.

== Cast ==
- Cor Ruys - Jacques, de damescoupeur
- Henny Schroeder - Mevr. Georgette
- Jeanne Van der Pers - Lily
- Paula de Waart - Polly
- Kitty Kluppell - Mannequin
- Yvonne George - Mannequin
