= The Blarney Stone (film) =

1933 British film by Tom Walls

- Directed by: Tom Walls
- Written by: A. R. Rawlinson; Lennox Robinson
- Produced by: Herbert Wilcox
- Starring: Tom Walls; Anne Grey; Robert Douglas
- Music by: Idris Lewis
- Production company: British and Dominions
- Distributed by: Woolf and Freedman
- Release date: March 1933
- Running time: 81 minutes
- Country: United Kingdom
- Language: English

The Blarney Stone (also known as The Blarney Kiss) is a 1933 British comedy film directed by and starring Tom Walls. It also features Anne Grey, Robert Douglas, Zoe Palmer and Peter Gawthorne. The screenplay concerns a penniless Irishman who becomes the business partner of an English aristocrat with a penchant for high-stakes gambling.

The film was made at British and Dominion's Elstree Studios.

== Cast ==
- Tom Walls as Tim Fitzgerald
- Anne Grey as Lady Anne Cranton
- Robert Douglas as Lord Breethorpe
- W.G. Fay as The Leader
- J.A. O'Rourke as Sir Arthur
- George Barret
- Robert Horton
- Haidee Wright as Countess Eleanor
- Dorothy Tetley as Muriel Atkins
- Louis Bradfield as Mackintosh
- Zoe Palmer as Diana
- Charles Carson as Sir Arthur
- Peter Gawthorne
- Dickie Edwards as Tim Fitzgerald Jnr

== Bibliography ==
- Low, Rachael. Filmmaking in 1930s Britain. George Allen & Unwin, 1985.
- Wood, Linda. British Films, 1927–1939. British Film Institute, 1986.
