= Counsel's Opinion =

1933 British film by Allan Dwan

- Lobby card
- Directed by: Allan Dwan
- Written by: Arthur Wimperis; Gilbert Wakefield (play)
- Produced by: Alexander Korda
- Starring: Henry Kendall; Binnie Barnes
- Cinematography: Bernard Browne; Philip Tannura
- Edited by: Harold Young
- Production company: London Films
- Release date: March 1933 (UK)
- Running time: 75 minutes
- Country: United Kingdom
- Language: English

Counsel's Opinion is a lost 1933 British romantic comedy film directed by Allan Dwan and starring Henry Kendall and Binnie Barnes. it was written by Arthur Wimperis and Dorothy Greenhill based on a 1931 play by Gilbert Wakefield. It was one of three films directed in Britain in the early 1930s by Dwan and was an early production from Alexander Korda's London Films. It was remade in 1938 as The Divorce of Lady X.

== Preservation status ==
The British Film Institute has classed Counsel's Opinion as a lost film included in its "75 Most Wanted" list. The BFI National Archive holds a collection of ephemera and stills but no film or video materials.

== Plot ==
Divorce barrister Logan arrives back in London from a trip overseas to find the whole city fogbound. Unable to reach his flat, he books into the exclusive Royal Parks Hotel, where a costume ball is taking place. Many of the partygoers are also stranded by the fog and while some are happy to bed down for the night in the hotel lounge, Leslie sweet-talks Logan into letting her stay in his suite. Although the pair are attracted to each other, the night passes innocently with Leslie in the bedroom and Logan in the sitting-room. As he leaves the suite for work the next morning, Logan barrels into a lady's maid in the corridor outside the room.

On arriving at chambers, Logan is asked to act as counsel for Lord Rockburn, who is seeking a divorce from his wife. Logan accepts the brief, but then discovers to his horror that Lady Rockburn was a guest at the Royal Parks Hotel ball the previous night, and a cornerstone of the case is alleged impropriety after a maid observed a man leaving her room that morning. Convinced that Lady Rockburn can only be Leslie, Logan tries to back out from the case, until Lord Rockburn produces his chief witness the maid, who shows no sign of recognising Logan after their brief encounter in the hotel corridor.

When Leslie calls to return a dressing gown Logan lent her, he invites her to dine with him that evening, still believing her to be Lady Rockburn and intending to inform her of the situation. At the restaurant he lays his cards on the table and Leslie reassures him that she reciprocates his feelings. The romantic evening comes to an abrupt end when Lord Rockburn shows up at the same restaurant accompanied by another woman, and Logan and Leslie are forced to make an unobtrusive early exit to avoid a potentially scandalous public scene. They go back to Logan's flat, where he assures Leslie that he has fallen in love with her and will if necessary sacrifice his legal career for her. Meanwhile, Lord Rockburn is informed that a private detective he has on the case has uncovered the identity of his wife's lover. He decides to visit Logan immediately to tell him the good news, and is baffled by Logan's horrified reaction when he opens the door. Logan admits him to the flat where Leslie is sitting, throwing himself on Lord Rockburn's mercy by confessing that he loves her and is prepared to face the consequences. To his astonishment, the bewildered Lord Rockburn informs him that he has never seen Leslie before in his life. Leslie then confesses that she has gone along with Logan's incorrect assumption as a means of seeing how much he would be prepared to give up for her. She tells him that she is in fact a widow, and that he has passed the test with flying colours.

== Cast ==
- Henry Kendall as Logan
- Binnie Barnes as Leslie
- Lawrence Grossmith as Lord Rockburn
- Cyril Maude as Willock
- Francis Lister as James Gowan
- Harry Tate as taxi driver
- C. Denier Warren as hotel manager
- Mary Charles as Stella Marston
- Margaret Baird as Saunders
- J. Fisher White as Judge
- Stanley Lathbury as George

== Production ==
Details in the survising press book for the film suggest that Counsel's Opinion had a generous budget and relatively high production values for a British film of the early 1930s, with permission being obtained for location filming in London's Middle Temple.

== Reception and later history ==
Kine Weekly wrote: "The characterisation is extremely good, the dialogue has wit, and the direction and production qualities are marked by polish. The film offers diverting light entertainment of quality, and makes a special appeal to good-class patrons. ... Heary Kendall sweeps through the picture with an easy sense of humour as Logan, and does not neglect character. Binnie Barnes is delightful as the provocative Leslie. ... The story is written with smart ingenuity, and although some of the situations are not entirely new, they wear well and their piquancy never fails to register. The quality of the acting is certainly well above the average, and first-class team work, coupled with good production qualities, gives the picture that touch of class which too rarely stamps British films."

The Daily Film Renter wrote: "Witty dialogue and piquant situations .... Excellent presentation of Law Courts, the Temple, fashionable restaurant, and luxurious chambers. Admirable cast includes Cyril Maude and Harry Tate in clever characterisations. Good comedy booking that should prove acceptable for most halls."

Picturegoer wrote: "A neat, if somewhat theatrical comedy, which loses some of the piquancy necessary to the success of its type through the determination of Henry Kendall to treat what is meant to be an ultrasophisticated light comedy theme as broad farce. ... The situations provide much natural humour, but Alan Dwan has slowed up the action with a preponderance of detail. Binnie Barnes turns in a first-class performance as the woman in the case, and Cyril Maude brings practised skill to a minor rôle."

Picture Show wrote: "The picture has its moments – but one can scarcely say its minutes – as a really funny picture."
