= B. E. Doxat-Pratt =

British film director

Bernard Edwin Doxat-Pratt (1886 – unknown) was a British film director who worked for Anglo-Hollandia and Granger-Binger.

== Biography ==
Doxat-Pratt was born in Norwood, Surrey. He served with the Royal Air Force during World War I.

He married Jessie Doxat-Pratt in 1912 and abandoned her a few months later; she divorced him in 1915. He moved to Haarlem in 1920 with his second wife and three children. He divorced in 1929, and was never heard of again by his family, apart from a chance encounter with Norman, his son, in 1940.

He was sent to prison for fraud in 1925 and again in 1927. In 1931, he was sentenced to three months in prison for writing fraudulent checks.

His wife, Ethel, and children Betty, Jack and Norman appeared in several of his films.

== Filmography ==
Year	Original title	English title	Role
1919	Het verborgen leven	Hidden Lives	advisor
1919	Zonnetje		director
1920	De heldendaad van Peter Wells	The Little Hour of Peter Wells	director
1920	De vrouw van den minister	John Heriot's Wife	director, writer
1920	Hard tegen hard	The Skin Game	director, writer
1920	Wat eeuwig blijft	Fate's Plaything	actor, director
1920	Zooals ik ben	As God Made Her	director, writer
1920	Zuster Brown	Sister Brown	director
1921	Een lach en een traan	Laughter and Tears (Circus Jim)	director
1921	Onder spiritistischen dwang	The Other Person	director
1922	Bulldog Drummond		writer
1922	De Jantjes	The Bluejackets	director
1927		My Lord The Chauffeur	director
