= Gloria transita =

- Directed by: Johan Gildemeijer
- Written by: Johan Gildemeijer
- Cinematography: Willy Mullens
- Release date: 24 September 1917
- Country: Netherlands
- Language: Silent

Gloria transita is a 1917 Dutch silent film directed by Johan Gildemeijer

== Cast ==
- August Van den Hoeck - Ben Solotti
- Henny Schroeder - Henny
- Frederick Vogeding - Gaston
- Eberhard Erfmann - Baron Villers
- Nelly De Heer - Baron Viller's mother
- Jacques Cauveren - Operazanger
- Jan Feith - Lid van de Muzikale Club
- Piet Fuchs - Misdadige vader van Henny
- Johan Gildemeijer - Tennisspeler
- Irma Lozin - Operazangeres
- Wilhelmina van den Hoeck - Operazangeres
- Jan van der Horst
- Ernst Winar
