= Hidden Lives =

1920 film

- Directed by: Maurits Binger; B. E. Doxat-Pratt
- Written by: Robert Hichens; John Knittel
- Release date: 20 February 1920
- Country: Netherlands
- Language: Silent

Hidden Lives (Dutch: Het verborgen leven) is a 1920 Dutch silent film directed by Maurits Binger. It is based on a novel by John Knittel.

== Plot ==
Arundel is an ambitious professor who is working on a book on the evolution of the female. He does this at the expense of neglecting his beautiful wife Rose. Rose is fed up with the lack of attention and being only an object. She does not know how to get through to him however. One day she meets an old flame Lt Robert Carey. She had thought their passion was over but it is reignited. They renew their friendship and spent all their time together. Though a friend of her husband Godowski tries to seduce Rose, he does not succeed as Rose has only eyes for Carey. Godowski eventually realises this.

Six years pass by and Carey has been out of Rose's life for some time but upon his return he tries to contact Rose. Rose has been fulfilling her role as the mother of five-year-old Dora. The professor has drastically changed in this time and he has given up his career, vesting all his attention on his wife and daughter. As Rose meets Carey again, she admits that her heart belongs to him and she admits that Carey is the father of the child.

Carey demands that Rose leaves her husband but Rose does not dare to do this. Carey writes her a letter threatening to leave for India if she does not leave her husband. Being desperate, she loses the letter which Godowski later finds and uses to blackmail Rose. Rose tells Carey that it is best if he leaves for India. Carey who is unable to accept this news decides to end his life. As Rose hears this, she collapse. She tells the truth to her husband who is furious and leaves her. Both their lives are for a time one of loneliness but they are reunited when Doris falls seriously ill.

== Cast ==
- Annie Bos - Rose Arundel (as Anna Bosilova)
- Adelqui Migliar - Professor Arundel
- Renee Spiljar - Dora
- Lola Cornero
- Harry Waghalter - Godowski, een pianist
- Bert Darley - Captain Robert Carey
- Carl Tobi
- Leni Marcus
- Aafje Schutte
- Ernst Winar
