= Wuthering Heights (1920 film) =

1920 film

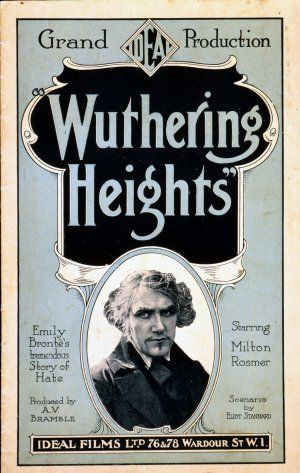
- Theatrical release poster
- Directed by: A.V. Bramble
- Written by: Eliot Stannard
- Based on: Wuthering Heights; 1847 novel by Emily Brontë
- Starring: Milton Rosmer
- Production company: Ideal Film Company
- Distributed by: Ideal Film Company
- Release date: 1920
- Running time: 90 minutes
- Country: United Kingdom
- Language: Silent (English intertitles)

Wuthering Heights is a 1920 British silent drama film directed by A.V. Bramble and starring Milton Rosmer, Colette Brettel and Warwick Ward. It is the first film adaptation of the 1847 novel Wuthering Heights by Emily Brontë, and was primarily filmed in and around her home village of Haworth. It is not known whether the film currently survives, and it is considered to be a lost film.

In 2014, a film script used by director A.V. Bramble consisting of 22 pages of production notes alongside stills from the set of the cast and crew were found and displayed to the public at the Brontë Parsonage Museum.

== Production ==
Unlike most later adaptations of the Emily Brontë novel, this version includes the novel's storyline following the second generation. Contemporary reviews however noted that in spite of following the book closely, certain liberties are taken with the novel, and that the characters Isabella Linton and her son Linton Heathcliff are omitted from the movie altogether.

== Reception ==
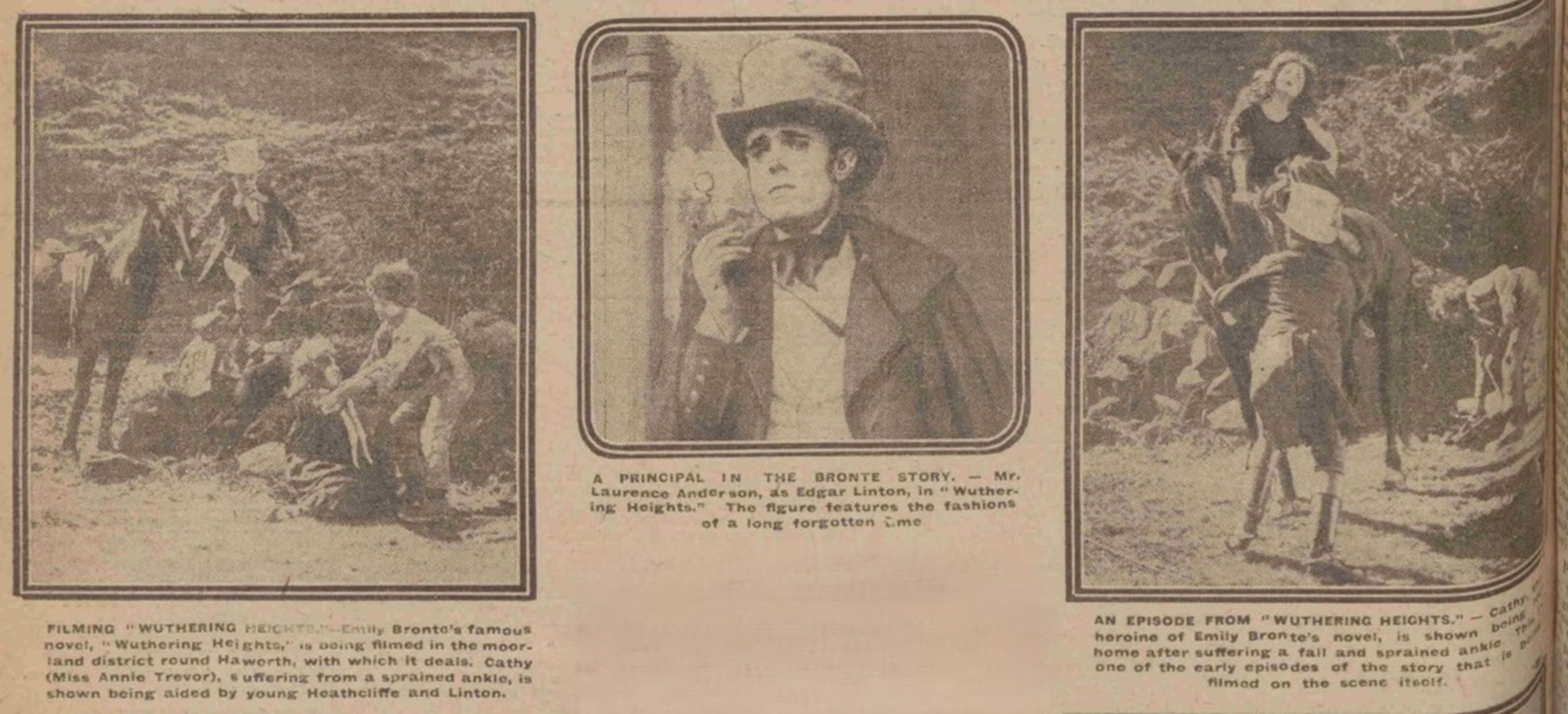
Newspaper clipping about the film, 17 May 1920

A review from The Guardian writes, "It is a credit to the British film industry that the screen version of the book shown yesterday in Manchester should be so good", and give praise to Milton Rosmer's performance, "It is violent, blustering, turbulently melodramatic: just the kind of acting that Emily Brontë would have wanted for her Heathcliff."

== Cast ==
- Milton Rosmer as Heathcliff
  - Albert Brantford as Heathcliff (age 12)
  - Derrick Ronald as Heathcliff (age 5)
- Ann Trevor as Catherine Earnshaw
  - Twinkles Hunter as Cathy Earnshaw (age 6)
- Colette Brettel as Catherine Linton
  - Audrey Smith as Catherine Linton (age 7)
- Warwick Ward as Hindley Earnshaw
  - Roy Lennol as Hindley Earnshaw (age 14)
- John Lawrence Anderson as Edgar Linton
  - Lewis Barry-Furniss as Edgar Linton (age 15)
- Cecil Morton York as Mr. Earnshaw
- Cyril Raymond as Hareton Earnshaw
  - Lewis Barber as Hareton Earnshaw (age 15)
- Dora De Winton as Mrs. Linton
- Aileen Bagot as Frances Earnshaw
- Mrs. Templeton as Nelly Dean
- George Traill as Joseph
- Alfred Bennett as Reverend Shields
- Edward Thirlby as Attorney
- G. Mallalieu as Doctor

== See also ==
- List of lost films
