= Liefdesoffer =

1916 film

- Directed by: Maurits Binger
- Release date: 23 June 1916
- Country: Netherlands
- Language: Silent

Liefdesoffer is a 1916 Dutch silent drama film directed by Maurits Binger.

== Cast ==
- Annie Bos - Margareet Blanker
- Willem van der Veer
- Lola Cornero
- Pierre Mols
- Paula de Waart - Mevr. Miles / Mrs. Miles
- Louis van Dommelen
