= Thérèse Étienne =

- Directed by: Denys de La Patellière
- Written by: John Knittel (novel); Roland Laudenbach; Denys de La Patellière
- Produced by: Georges Agiman; Jacques Bar
- Starring: James Robertson Justice; Françoise Arnoul; Pierre Vaneck
- Cinematography: Roger Hubert
- Edited by: Georges Alépée
- Music by: Maurice Thiriet
- Production companies: Cité Films; Les Films Agiman; Monica Film; Sadfi Films
- Distributed by: Columbia Films (France); CEIAD (Italy)
- Release date: 7 February 1958
- Running time: 90 minutes
- Countries: France; Italy
- Language: French

Thérèse Étienne is a 1958 French-Italian drama film directed by Denys de La Patellière, and starring James Robertson Justice, Françoise Arnoul, and Pierre Vaneck. It was based on a 1939 novel by John Knittel. The film's sets were designed by the art director Paul-Louis Boutié. It was shot at the Billancourt Studios in Paris and on location in Switzerland.

== Synopsis ==
A young French woman marries an older businessman, but soon becomes involved with his son.

== Plot ==
In Switzerland, Thérèse Étienne, a 25-year-old peasant woman, arrives in the canton of Bern looking for work. She is hired as a servant on the farm of Anton Müller, who runs his estate with an iron fist. An imposing man in his fifties, Anton tirelessly pursues Thérèse. Faced with her resistance and eager to possess her at all costs, he takes her as his wife without further discussion.

At the wedding, Thérèse meets Gottfried Müller, Anton's son from a previous marriage, and it is love at first sight. Exasperated by her husband's rudeness and drunkenness, Thérèse takes refuge in Gottfried's arms - and bed. When Anton discovers their affair and his wife's pregnancy by his son, he flies into such a rage that Thérèse, frightened and distraught, poisons and kills him.

Gottfried, overcome with remorse, accuses himself of the crime. At her trial, Thérèse reveals the truth to the court. She is convicted, and her son is born in prison.

== Cast ==
- James Robertson Justice as Anton Muller
- Françoise Arnoul as Thérèse Étienne Muller
- Pierre Vaneck as Gottfried Muller
- Guy Decomble as Rothlisberger
- Georges Chamarat as Le Président de la Cour
- François Chaumette as Le procureur
- Roger Burckhardt as Le prêtre
- Pierre Collet as L'avocat
- Léonce Corne as Le notaire
- Erika Dentzler as Hedwige

== Bibliography ==
- Jean A. Gili & Aldo Tassone. Parigi-Roma: 50 anni di coproduzioni italo-francesi (1945-1995). Editrice Il castoro, 1995.
