= Ernst Winar =

Dutch actor (1894–1978)

- Born: Wilhelm Joseph Karl Eichhoff; 3 September 1894; Leiden, Netherlands
- Died: 28 June 1978 (aged 83)
- Other name: Ernest Winar
- Occupations: Actor, film director
- Years active: 1916–1955
- Spouse: Colette Brettel

Ernst Winar (born Wilhelm Joseph Carl Eichhoff; 3 September 1894 – 28 June 1978) was a Dutch actor and film director. He appeared in 34 films between 1916 and 1955. He also directed 14 films between 1922 and 1955. In 1920 he published Peccavi...???, a then-scandalous novel with a gay protagonist, co-written with fellow actor Adolphe Engers.

== Selected filmography ==
- Majoor Frans (1916)
- La renzoni (1916)
- Gloria transita (1917)
- Ulbo Garvema (1917)
- Toen 't licht verdween (1918)
- Pro domo (1918)
- A Carmen of the North (1919)
- The Devil in Amsterdam (1919)
- Hidden Lives (1920)
- The Flight into Death (1921)
- Ash Wednesday (1921)
- On the Red Cliff (1922)
- The Man in the Background (1922, directed)
- Comedy of the Heart (1924)
- The Great Opportunity (1925)
- The Company Worth Millions (1925)
- The Proud Silence (1925)
- The Girl on the Road (1925)
- Watch on the Rhine (1926)
- The Dashing Archduke (1927)
- Circus Renz (1927)
- On the Banks of the River Weser (1927)
- Paragraph 182 (1927, directed)
- The Harbour Baron (1928)
- What a Woman Dreams of in Springtime (1929)
