= The Rising Generation =

1928 film

- Argentine poster
- Directed by: George Dewhurst; Harley Knoles
- Written by: Dion Titheradge
- Starring: Alice Joyce; Jameson Thomas; Robin Irvine; William Freshman
- Edited by: George Dewhurst
- Production company: Westminster Films
- Distributed by: Williams and Pritchard Films
- Release date: September 1928
- Running time: 7,000 feet
- Country: United Kingdom
- Languages: Silent; English intertitles

The Rising Generation is a lost 1928 British silent comedy film directed by Harley Knoles and George Dewhurst and starring Alice Joyce, Jameson Thomas and Robin Irvine. It was based on a play by Laura Leycester. The screenplay concerns a couple who masquerade as servants.

== Cast ==
- Alice Joyce as Mrs Kent
- Jameson Thomas as Major Kent
- Robin Irvine as George Breese
- William Freshman as Robert Kent
- Joan Barry as Peggy Kent
- Betty Nuthall as School Friend
- Gerald Ames as John Parmoor
- Gerald Rawlinson as Augustus
- Pamela Deane as Friend
- Eric Findon as Friend
- Eugenie Prescott as Maid
- Clare Greet as Cook
- Nervo and Knox as Themselves

== Preservation status ==
- This film is now lost.
