= The Other Person =

1921 film

- Directed by: Maurits Binger; B. E. Doxat-Pratt
- Written by: Fergus Hume (novel); Benedict James (screenplay)
- Starring: Zoe Palmer; Adelqui Migliar; Arthur Pusey; Ivo Dawson
- Cinematography: Feiko Boersma; Jan Smit
- Release date: 12 April 1921
- Running time: 74 minutes
- Countries: Netherlands; Great Britain
- Language: Silent

The Other Person (Dutch: Onder spiritistischen dwang) is a 1921 Dutch-British silent mystery film directed by Maurits Binger and B.E. Doxat-Pratt. It was a co-production between a Dutch film company and a British film company.

The film was based on a 1920 mystery novel called The Other Person which was written by Fergus Hume, the prolific author of crime fiction, thrillers and mysteries. Lead actress Zoe Palmer went on to star in Sweeney Todd (1928).

== Plot ==
The film is about a spiritualist whose darkest secret is revealed during a seance, a scene that critic Troy Howarth said was strikingly similar to a scene in Dario Argento's 1974 film Deep Red, in which a murderer is unmasked during a seance.

== Cast ==
- Zoe Palmer - Alice Dene
- Adelqui Migliar - Andrew Grain
- Arthur Pusey - Chris Larcher
- E. Story Gofton - Dr. Press
- Willem Hunsche - Amos Larcher
- Ivo Dawson - Squire Grain
- Nora Hayden - Dolly Banks
- Arthur Walcott - Reverend Augustus Dene
- Annie Busquet - Mevr. Larcher
- Johan de Boer
- Frans Meermans
