= Watch on the Rhine (1926 film) =

1926 film

- Directed by: Helene Lackner
- Written by: Ludwig Hamburger; Helene Lackner
- Starring: Hans Mierendorff; Ernst Winar; Gustav Adolf Semler
- Cinematography: Arpad Viragh
- Production company: Koop-Film
- Distributed by: Koop-Film
- Release date: March 1926
- Country: Germany
- Languages: Silent; German intertitles

Watch on the Rhine (German:Die Wacht am Rhein or Aus des Rheinlands Schicksalstagen) is a 1926 German silent historical film directed by Helene Lackner and starring Hans Mierendorff, Ernst Winar and Gustav Adolf Semler.

The film's art direction was by Karl Machus.

== Cast ==
- Hans Mierendorff as Franz Großmann - Großindustrieller
- Ernst Winar as René Clavignac - franz. Kapitän
- Gustav Adolf Semler as Charles Daumont - Franz. Ingenieur
- Walter Slezak as Walter Thiermann - Ing. bei Großmann
- Frida Richard as Frau Thiermann - dessen alte Mutter
- Maria Zelenka as Maria Kreuz
- Ernst Behmer
- Colette Brettel
- Maria Forescu
- Stani Frenzel
- Robert Garrison
- Mira Hart
- Margarete Kupfer
- Robert Leffler
- Hertha Müller
- Lotte Müller
- Ernst Pittschau
- Elza Temary

== Bibliography ==
- Quinlan, David. The Illustrated Directory of Film Stars. Hippocrene Books, 1981.
