= Zoe Palmer =

British actress (1903–1983)

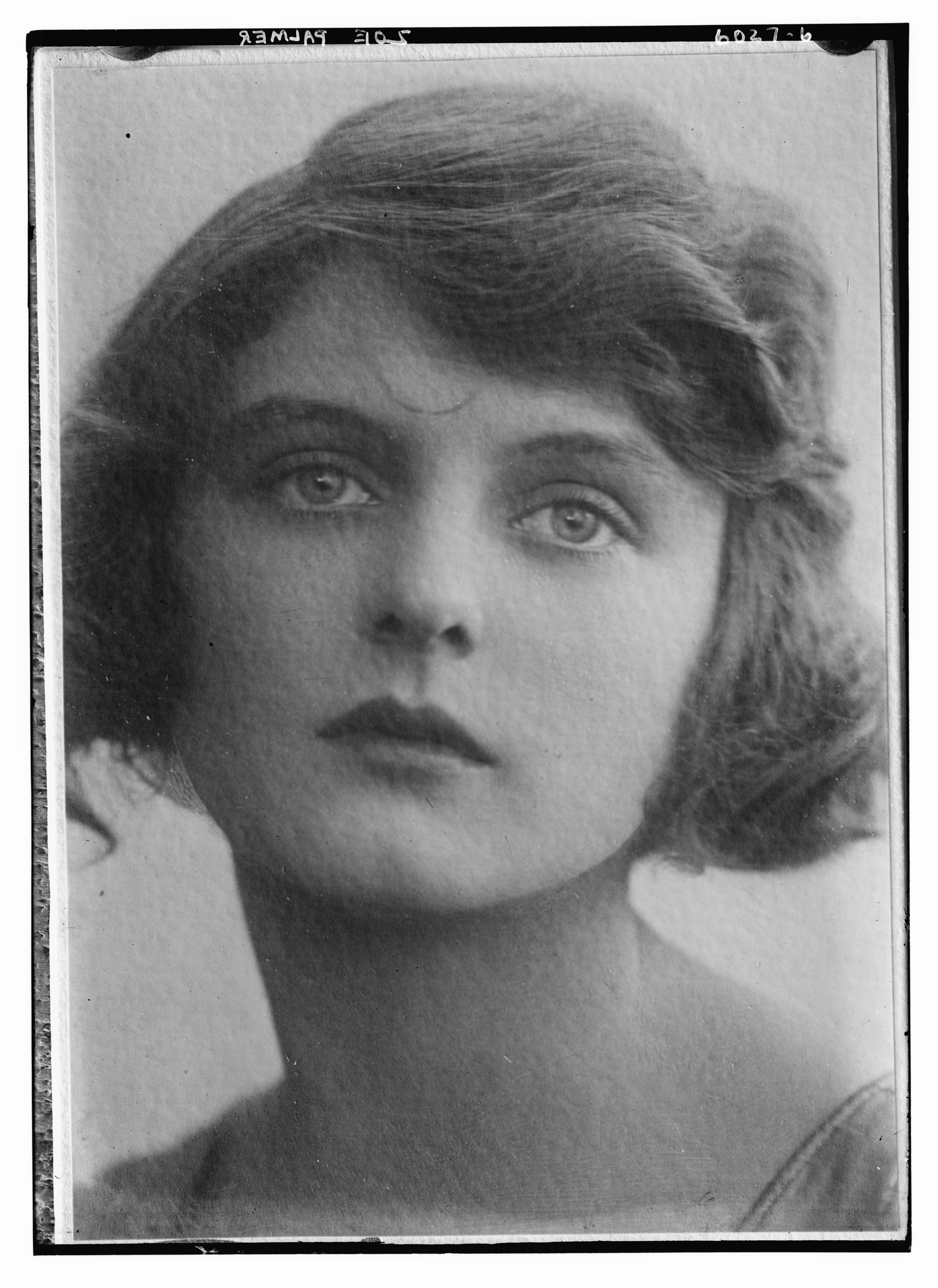
- Zoe Palmer
- Born: 29 August 1903; Fulham, London, England
- Died: 13 March 1983 (aged 79); Fordingbridge, Hampshire, England
- Occupation: Actor
- Years active: 1920–1933 (film)

Zoe Palmer (29 August 1903 – 13 March 1983) was a British stage and film actress.

== Selected filmography ==
- Walls of Prejudice (1920)
- The Black Tulip (1921)
- The Other Person (1921)
- Was She Guilty? (1922)
- The Luck of the Navy (1927)
- Sweeney Todd (1928)
- Double Dealing (1932)
- Above Rubies (1932)
- The Blarney Stone (1933)

== Bibliography ==
- Goble, Alan. The Complete Index to Literary Sources in Film. Walter de Gruyter, 1999.
