= Gouden ketenen =

1917 film

- Directed by: Maurits Binger
- Written by: Louise Stratenus
- Release date: 18 May 1917
- Country: Netherlands

Gouden ketenen is a 1917 Dutch silent film directed by Maurits Binger.

== Cast ==
- Annie Bos - Lona
- Cor Smits - Van Haaften
- Cecil Ryan - Henri van Rhenen
- Eugène Beeckman
- Lola Cornero
- Paula de Waart - Mevrouw van Borselen
- Fred Homann
- Piet Te Nuyl
- Jeanne Van der Pers - Henri's zuster
- Willem van der Veer
- Jan van Dommelen - Kolonel van Borselen / Zeeman
