= Zonnetje =

- Directed by: Maurits Binger; B. E. Doxat-Pratt
- Written by: Reginald Lawson; Eleanor Morse Savi
- Cinematography: Feiko Boersma
- Release date: 9 December 1919
- Running time: 93 minutes
- Country: Netherlands
- Language: Silent

Zonnetje is a 1919 Dutch silent film directed by Maurits Binger.

== Cast ==
- Annie Bos - Gloria Grey
- Adelqui Migliar - Tom Chelmsford / Robert Chelmsford
- Renee Spiljar - Dolly
- Lola Cornero - Cora Chelmsford
- Harry Waghalter - John Chelmsford
- Norman Doxat-Pratt
- Kees Pruis - Halliway
- Reginald Lawson
- Carl Tobi
- Marie Spiljar
- Leni Marcus
