= Lola Cornero =

Dutch silent film actress

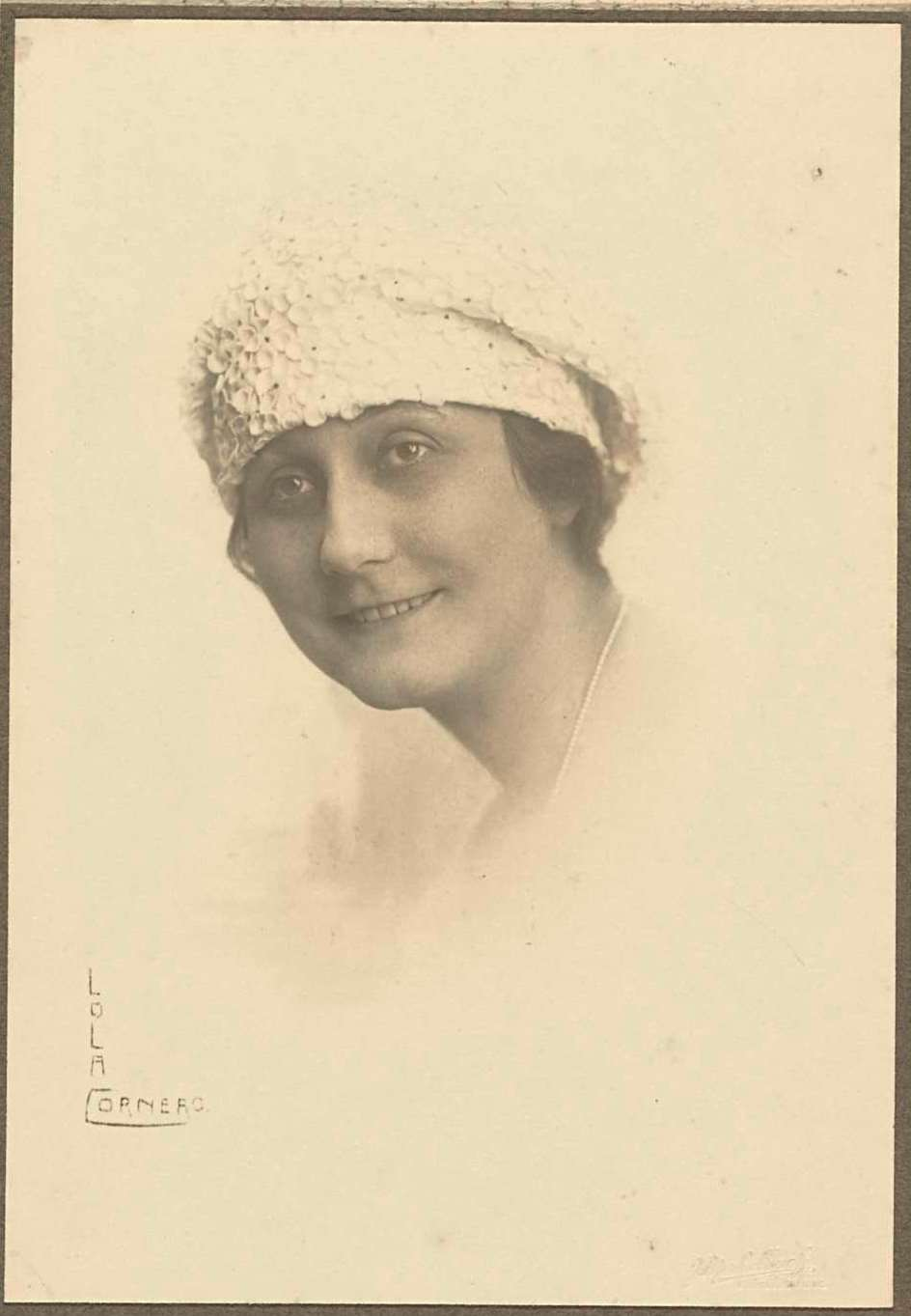
- Born: 30 March 1892; Kiel, Germany
- Died: 6 May 1980 (aged 88); Amsterdam, Netherlands
- Occupation: Actress
- Years active: 1916-1920

Lola Cornero (30 March 1892 – 6 May 1980) was a Dutch film actress of the silent era. She appeared in 17 films between 1916 and 1920.

== Filmography ==
- John Heriot's Wife (1920)
- As God Made Her (1920)
- Het verborgen leven (1920)
- Zonnetje (1919)
- Amerikaansche meisjes (1918)
- Oorlog en vrede - 1918 (1918)
- Oorlog en vrede - 1916 (1918)
- Oorlog en vrede - 1914 (1918)
- Toen 't licht verdween (1918)
- De kroon der schande (1918)
- Ulbo Garvema (1917)
- Gouden ketenen (1917)
- Madame Pinkette & Co (1917)
- La renzoni (1916)
- Majoor Frans (1916)
- Liefdesoffer (1916)
- Vogelvrij (1916)
