= The Company Worth Millions =

1925 film

- Directed by: Fred Sauer
- Written by: Luise Heilborn-Körbitz
- Starring: Olaf Fjord; Olga Chekhova; Colette Brettel
- Production company: Ungo-Film
- Release date: 24 February 1925
- Country: Germany
- Languages: Silent; German intertitles

The Company Worth Millions (German: Die Millionen-Kompagnie) is a 1925 German silent film directed by Fred Sauer and starring Olaf Fjord, Olga Chekhova and Colette Brettel.

== Cast ==
- Olaf Fjord
- Olga Chekhova
- Colette Brettel
- Ernst Winar
- Robert Garrison
- Frieda Lehndorf
- Hermann Picha

== Bibliography ==
- Beevor, Antony. The Mystery of Olga Chekhova. Penguin, 2005.
