= De leugen van Pierrot =

1922 film

- Directed by: Maurits Binger
- Written by: Jacques van Hoven
- Production company: Filmfabriek Hollandia
- Distributed by: HAP Film-Company
- Release date: 20 October 1922
- Running time: 56 minutes
- Country: Netherlands
- Language: Silent

De leugen van Pierrot is a 1922 Dutch silent drama film directed by Maurits Binger.

== Cast ==
- Adelqui Migliar
- Esther de Boer-van Rijk - Pierrots blinde moeder
- Henny Schroeder
- Jan van Dommelen
- Renee Spiljar - Een kleine Columbine
- Martijn de Vries - Een kleine Pierot

== Production ==
Scenes were taken in Groenendaal, in addition to interiors designed by Theo van der Lugt.
