= Mimi Boesnach =

Dutch film actor (1899-1982)

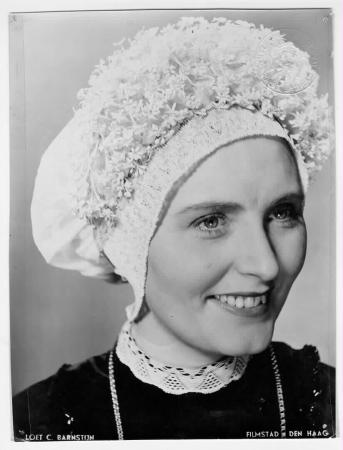
- Mimi Boesnach in Merijntje Gijzens Jeugd (1936)
- Born: 4 November 1899; Amsterdam
- Died: 20 April 1982 (aged 82); Amsterdam
- Citizenship: Dutch
- Occupations: actress, singer

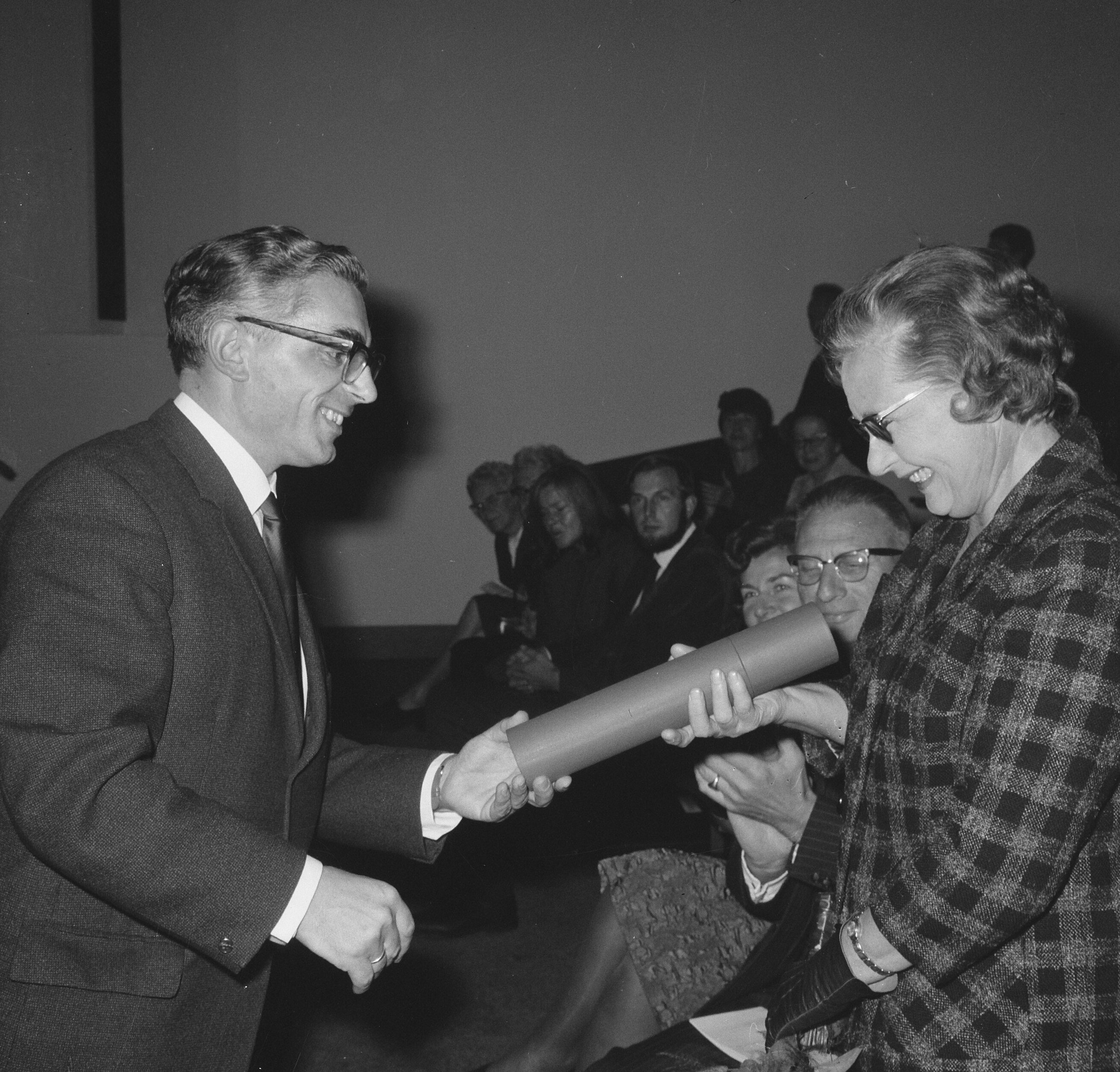
Mimi Boesnach received a certificate from the Municipality of Amsterdam in 1965.

Mimi Boesnach, pseudonym of Maria Alida Pieters, (4 November 1899, Amsterdam – 20 April 1982, Amsterdam) was a Dutch actress and singer. Her career spanned over sixty years. She won several theater awards.

== Career ==
She grew up in an artistic family; her mother was a variety artist, as was her stepfather, Gerson Busnac, whose surname she adopted and wrote as Boesnach. At the age of eleven, she was already working as a ticket seller in cabaret cafés. She also performed as a child soubrette at fairs. At the age of fourteen, she had small roles in the Flora revues of Louis and Heintje Davids.

She got her first real role at the age of 18 alongside Isidoor Zwaaf in the revue Moeder Hij doet 't weer by Rip and Michel de Cock. Afterwards, she starred in the (silent) feature film De Kroon der Schande (1918), directed by Maurits Binger, based on a book by Charles Garvice. She also appeared in Binger’s silent film trilogy Oorlog en vrede, released in 1914, 1916, and 1918.

== Radio plays ==
Boesnach also acted in Radio drama, including Drie vrouwen, Yamamba, De moeder, Het systeem van pater Jensen, and De witte villa. In the late 1950s, Decca Records released a series of gramophone records on which Boesnach reads fairy tales.
