= Rechten der jeugd =

1921 film

- Directed by: Maurits Binger
- Written by: L. T. J. Fontein; Adelqui Migliar
- Cinematography: Jan Smit
- Release date: 28 October 1921
- Running time: 82 minutes
- Country: Netherlands
- Language: Silent

Rechten der jeugd is a 1921 Dutch silent film directed by Maurits Binger.

== Cast ==
- Annie Bos - Maria
- Adelqui Migliar - Schilder Gerard van Hogelanden
- Jan van Dommelen
- Jeanne Van der Pers
- Renee Spiljar
- Sophie Willemse
