= John Heriot's Wife =

1920 film

- Directed by: Maurits Binger; B. E. Doxat-Pratt
- Written by: Alice Askew; Claude Askew; B. E. Doxat-Pratt
- Production company: Anglo-Hollandia
- Release date: 14 July 1920
- Countries: Netherlands; United Kingdom
- Language: Silent

John Heriot's Wife (Dutch: De vrouw van de minister) is a 1920 Dutch-British silent crime film directed by Maurits Binger.

== Cast ==
- Mary Odette - Camilla Rivers
- Lola Cornero - Tante Lady Foxborough
- Henry Victor - John Heriot
- Annie Bos - Weduwe Clara Headcombe (as Anna Bosilova)
- Adelqui Migliar - Eric Ashlyn
- Renee Spiljar
- Carl Tobi
- Alex Benno
- Reginald Lawson
- Leni Marcus
- Fred Homann
