= Downhill (1927 film) =

1927 British film by Alfred Hitchcock

- Downhill on cover of Kinematograph Weekly, no. 1046, vol. 123
- Directed by: Alfred Hitchcock
- Written by: Adaption: Eliot Stannard
- Based on: Down Hill; 1926 play by Constance Collier; Ivor Novello
- Produced by: Michael Balcon; C. M. Woolf
- Starring: Ivor Novello; Robin Irvine; Isabel Jeans; Ian Hunter; Violet Farebrother
- Cinematography: Claude L. McDonnell
- Edited by: Ivor Montagu; Lionel Rich
- Production company: Gainsborough Pictures
- Distributed by: Woolf & Freedman Film Service
- Release date: 24 October 1927
- Running time: 105 minutes (2012 restoration)
- Country: United Kingdom
- Languages: Silent film English intertitles

Downhill is a 1927 British silent drama film directed by Alfred Hitchcock, starring Ivor Novello, Robin Irvine and Isabel Jeans, and based on the play Down Hill by Novello and Constance Collier. The film was produced by Gainsborough Pictures at their Islington studios. Downhill was Hitchcock's fourth film as director, but the fifth to be released. Its American alternative title was When Boys Leave Home.

== Plot ==
Downhill (1927)

At an expensive English boarding school for boys, Roddy Berwick is school captain and star rugby player. He and his best friend Tim Wakeley are approached by a shopgirl, Mabel, who invites them to her shop during off-hours to dance and make merry with her. Shortly after, Mabel tells the boys' headmaster that she is pregnant and that Roddy is the father. However, Tim is the father, and he cannot afford to be expelled because he needs to win a scholarship to attend the University of Oxford. Promising Tim that he will never reveal the truth, Roddy accepts expulsion.

Returning to his parents' home, Roddy finds that his father Sir Thomas Berwick believes him guilty of the false accusation. Roddy leaves home and finds work as a waiter at a dinner theatre, then marries lead actress Julia Fotheringale after inheriting £30,000 (equivalent to roughly £550,000 in 2025 money) from his godmother. Julia secretly continues an affair with her leading man Archie and discards Roddy after exhausting his inheritance and swindling him out of his mansion. To pay off his debts Roddy goes to work for a madame in a Paris dance hall who rents out Roddy as a taxi dancer (implying he is also a gigolo). One morning at dawn, looking around the near-empty dance hall at the remaining demimonde stragglers who've been up all night, and having been propositioned by a homely wealthy older woman, Roddy quits, disgusted with himself for having fallen so low in society and romancing women for money.

Roddy ends up alone and desperate in a shabby room in Marseille. Sailors take pity on him and ship him back home, possibly hoping for a reward. During the 5-day sea voyage, Roddy experiences delirium and elaborate nightmarish hallucinations, replaying the traumas of the past years, creating composite visions of the women who have used him for money, from Mabel the shopgirl, to Julia his ex-wife, to the madame, and the women who have availed themselves of his services. Disoriented, he stumbles his way through London with the chaos of the streets blending with and superimposing over visions of chaos in his mind. Eventually he finds his way home to his father, who joyfully welcomes him back and begs Roddy's forgiveness, having learned the truth about the shopgirl's false accusation. Roddy ends up back at school, starring in "old Boy" rugby matches, resuming his previous status and life.

== Cast ==
- Ivor Novello as Roddy Berwick
- Ben Webster as Dr. Dawson
- Norman McKinnel as Sir Thomas Berwick
- Robin Irvine as Tim Wakeley
- Jerrold Robertshaw as Reverend Henry Wakeley
- Sybil Rhoda as Sybil Wakeley
- Annette Benson as Mabel
- Lilian Braithwaite as Lady Berwick
- Isabel Jeans as Julia Fotheringale
- Ian Hunter as Archie
- Hannah Jones as The Dressmaker
- Barbara Gott as Madame Michet
- Violet Farebrother as The Poet
- Alf Goddard as The Swede
- J. Nelson as Hibbert

== Production ==
The film is based on the play Down Hill, which was written by its star Ivor Novello and Constance Collier under the combined alias David L'Estrange.

The stage performance had a short run in the West End and longer in the provinces. In the play, Novello thrilled his female fans by washing his bare legs in a scene following a rugby match. An appreciative James Agate, drama critic for the London Sunday Times, wrote: "The scent of good honest soap crosses the footlights." Alfred Hitchcock included a similar scene of Novello for the film, in which he is shown naked from the waist up.

Hitchcock used a variety of screen techniques with a minimum of title cards, preferring instead to allow the film's visual narrative tell the story. The scene after Roddy leaves home opens with the title card "The world of make-believe," but everything else in the scene is conveyed visually. A closeup of Roddy in a tuxedo pulls back to show that he is waiting on a table at a restaurant, where he pockets a woman's cigarette case. The camera then follows him to reveal that he is actually playing a waiter on stage in a theatre. Hitchcock also incorporated shots of a descending escalator at Maida Vale tube station as a visual metaphor for Roddy's downhill descent. Although in a later interview with Francois Truffaut, Hitchcock called that scene "a naive touch that I wouldn't do today," he also incorporated a later scene of Roddy descending in an elevator for a similar effect. Hitchcock played with shadow and light in much the same way as did directors of German expressionist films of the time, especially F.W. Murnau, for whom Hitchcock had worked as an assistant director. In the Parisian dance-hall scene, Roddy tells his life story to an apparently sympathetic older woman, but as the morning light comes through the windows, he is repelled by the tawdry, decadent scene and the woman's masculine-looking face. Hitchcock experimented with dream sequences by sometimes shooting them in superimpositions, but broke with the common use of blurred images to indicate a hallucinatory scene by "[embodying] the dream in the reality, in solid, unblurred images." While delirious on the ship, Roddy envisions his father approaching him in a manner reminiscent of Murnau's vampire in Nosferatu, and when he returns to London, Roddy envisions a policeman's face as his father's.

== Preservation status and home media ==
A fully tinted restoration of Downhill was completed in 2012 as part of the BFI's £2 million Save the Hitchcock 9 project to restore all of Hitchcock's surviving silent films.

Restored releases have appeared on DVD, Blu-ray and video on demand from Network Distributing in the UK, The Criterion Collection in the U.S., and many others.

In 2022, Downhill entered the public domain in the United States.
