= The Girl in the Taxi (1937 film) =

British musical comedy

- Opening titles
- Directed by: André Berthomieu
- Written by: Frederick Gotfurt; Austin Melford; Val Valentine
- Based on: The Girl in the Taxi by Frederick Fenn and Arthur Wimperis
- Produced by: Curtis Bernhardt; Eugène Tucherer
- Starring: Frances Day; Henri Garat; Lawrence Grossmith
- Cinematography: Roy Clark
- Edited by: Ray Pitt
- Music by: Jean Gilbert
- Production company: British Unity Pictures
- Distributed by: Associated British Film Distributors
- Release date: 3 September 1937
- Running time: 70 minutes
- Country: United Kingdom
- Language: English

The Girl in the Taxi is a 1937 British musical comedy film directed by André Berthomieu and starring Frances Day, Henri Garat and Lawrence Grossmith. It was based on the stage musical The Girl in the Taxi and was part of a trend of operetta films produced during the decade.

== Synopsis ==
In Paris, Baron des Aubrais is the head of The Society for the Reward for Virtue, but at night he becomes a roué, and pursues the same woman admired by his son.

== Cast ==
- Frances Day as Suzanne Pommarel
- Henri Garat as René Boislurette
- Lawrence Grossmith as Baron des Aubrais
- Jean Gillie as Jacqueline
- Mackenzie Ward as Hubert
- John Deverell as Emile Pomarel
- Helen Haye as Delphine
- Ben Field as Dominique
- Albert Whelan as Alexis
- Laurence Hanray as Charencey
- Joan Kemp-Welch as Suzanne Dupont

== Production ==
The film was shot at Ealing Studios in London, with sets designed by the art director Jean d'Eaubonne. A separate French-language version, Chaste Susanne, was shot at the same time by Berthomieu, with Henri Garat being the only actor to appear in both versions.

== Critical reception ==
In a contemporary review Kine Weekly said "Though it never succeeds in getting very far away from its technical and dramatically dated origins, this screen adaptation of the popular operetta of a quarter of a century ago, when Paris was considered more naughty than it is today, is put over in spirited style by its cast, while the alternately piquant and broadly farcical situations arising from amatory indiscretions, principally at the Mouin Rouge, of the hypocritical old moralist, still carry a fair quota of laughs."

The Radio Times Guide to Films gave the film 3/5 stars, writing: "The musical numbers are inadequate, but the farce is peppily played."

Leslie Halliwell said: "Moderately piquant comedy."
