= The Harbour Baron =

1928 film

- Directed by: Ernst Winar
- Written by: Tom Maro
- Starring: Colette Brettel; Hans Brausewetter; Eva Speyer
- Cinematography: Willy Winterstein
- Production company: Hom-Film
- Distributed by: Südfilm
- Release date: 1928
- Country: Germany
- Languages: Silent; German intertitles

The Harbour Baron (German: Der Hafenbaron) is a 1928 German silent film directed by Ernst Winar and starring Colette Brettel, Hans Brausewetter and Eva Speyer.

The film's sets were designed by Carl Ludwig Kirmse.

== Cast ==
- Colette Brettel as Dorrit, eine junge Witwe
- Hans Brausewetter as Walter Rohde, Offizier Handelsmarine
- Eva Speyer as Vorsteherin des Waisenheims
- Vala De Lys as Ilse, Dorrits Freundin
- John Mylong as Der 'Hafenbaron'
- Li Hayda as Lu, 'Sekretärin' des Hafenbarons
- Li Corda as Schwester des Waisenheims
- Sylvia Torf as Wirtschafterin des Waisenheims
- Antonie Jaeckel as Frau Gehrts, Walters Tante
- Art Winkler as Der Wirt
- Sophie Pagay as Die Wirtin

== Bibliography ==
- Gerhard Lamprecht. Deutsche Stummfilme: 1927-1931.
