= Lawrence Grossmith =

English actor (1877–1944)

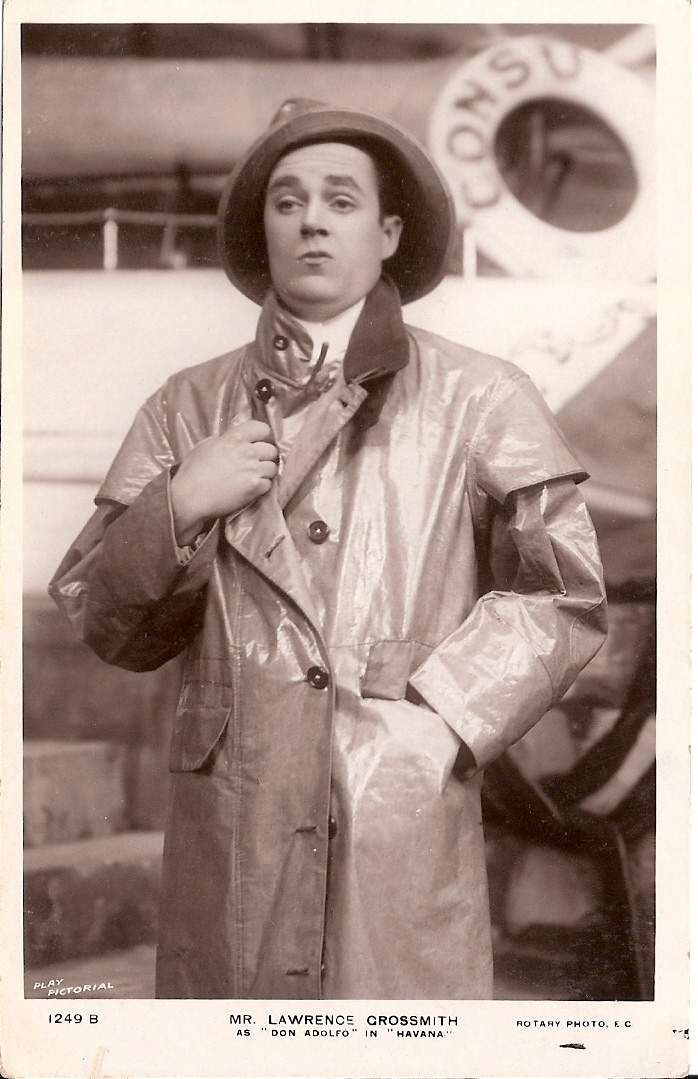
Grossmith in Havana (1908)

Lawrence Randall Grossmith (29 March 1877 – 21 February 1944) was an English actor, the son of the Gilbert and Sullivan performer George Grossmith and the brother of the actor-manager George Grossmith Jr.

After establishing his career in Edwardian musical comedy in London from the first years of the 20th century until the First World War (except for a brief period in the U.S.), Grossmith left England on an extensive tour of the U.S. and Australia, playing in both musicals and non-musical plays. He continued his stage career in England and America from 1924. From 1933 until his death in 1944, he acted in films as well as on stage.

== Life and career ==
Grossmith was born in London on 29 March 1877. He was the son of the actor George Grossmith, famous for his roles in the Savoy Operas, and Emmeline Rosa Noyce (1849–1905). His uncle was the actor Weedon Grossmith. He was educated at St Paul's College, Stony Stratford, London University School and Shrewsbury School. He was intended for a career as an engineer, but, like his father, his uncle and his elder brother, George Grossmith Jr., he was drawn to the theatre. He made his stage debut, in 1896, as Robert in Mam'zelle Nitouche at the Court Theatre.

In 1901 Grossmith played the title role in a stage adaptation of Struwwelpeter, a role very unlike the flâneur roles with which his name later became associated. In 1904 Grossmith married Coralie Blythe, a star of Edwardian musical comedy. Her brother was the dancer Vernon Castle. In the first years of the 20th century he became known for his appearances in Edwardian musical comedy, in such West End shows as The White Chrysanthemum (1905) and The Girl Behind the Counter (1906). In 1906 Grossmith and his wife Coralie Blythe were invited to go to New York by Lew Fields; taking Blythe's brother Vernon Castle with them. Later in 1906 the trio appeared at the Herald Square Theatre on Broadway in the musical revue About Town. He was back in London after this, appearing in Havana (1908) and Are You There? (1913).

In 1913 he went into management, taking over the Savoy Theatre. In 1915 Grossmith and Blythe appeared in Reubens and Kern's musical comedy Nobody Home on Broadway, which transferred to the Princess Theatre in 1916. Grossmith stayed in New York for some years before moving on to Australia and New Zealand, not returning to England until 1924. During these years he appeared in the musical comedies Flora Bella (1916) and Love o' Mike (1917). In the non-musical theatre his roles in this period included Major Lowndes in Somerset Maugham's Too Many Husbands (the American version of his Home and Beauty). He returned to Broadway in 1928, appearing there in The Cat and the Fiddle (1931) and Call It a Day (1936).

Grossmith made a silent film in 1914, The Brass Bottle. From 1933 to 1944, he made several talking films, taking major roles in Counsel's Opinion (1933), Tiger Bay (1934), Sing As We Go (1934), Everything in Life (1936), Silver Blaze (1937) The Girl in the Taxi (1937) and No Time for Comedy (1940).

Grossmith died on 21 February 1944 in Woodland Hills, California at 66, and was buried beside his wife in Woodlawn Cemetery in New York City.

== Selected filmography ==
- The Brass Bottle (1914) – Horace Ventmire
- The Common Cause (1919) – Tommy Atkins
- A House Divided (1919) – Ben Baldwin
- Counsel's Opinion (1933) – Lord Rockburn
- Cash (1933) – Joseph
- Rolling in Money (1934) – Duke of Braceborough
- Tiger Bay (1934) – Whistling Rufus
- The Luck of a Sailor (1934) – Silvius
- The Private Life of Don Juan (1934) – Pedo, Uncle of the Castle Girl, Who Knows Better
- Sing As We Go (1934) – Sir William Upton
- It Happened in Paris (1935) – Bernard
- Everything in Life (1936) – Lewis Radford
- Men Are Not Gods (1936) – Stanley
- Song of the Forge (1937) – Den Dalton
- Make-Up (1937) – Sir Edward Hutton
- Silver Blaze (1937) – Sir Henry Baskerville
- The Girl in the Taxi (1937) – Baron des Aubrais
- Smash and Grab (1939) – Rankin
- I'm from Missouri (1939) – Colonel Marchbank
- Captain Fury (1939) – Governor
- All Women Have Secrets (1939) – Professor Hewitt
- Opened by Mistake (1940) – Jarvis Woodruff
- No Time for Comedy (1940) – Frank
- Journey for Margaret (1942) – Minor role (uncredited)
- Flesh and Fantasy (1943) – Relative (uncredited)
- Gaslight (1944) – Lord Dalroy
