= Madame Pinkette & Co =

1917 film

- Directed by: Maurits Binger
- Written by: Arthur Applin
- Release date: 1 May 1917
- Country: Netherlands
- Language: Silent

Madame Pinkette & Co is a 1917 Dutch silent crime film directed by Maurits Binger.

== Cast ==
- Annie Bos - Liane Fraser
- Cecil Ryan - Joseph Limsdock
- Jan van Dommelen - Boekhouder
- Paula de Waart - Peggy
- Adelqui Migliar - Peggy's verloofde
- Fred Penley - Een Engelsman
- Lola Cornero
- Louis van Dommelen
- Alex Benno
- Jules de Koning
- Walter Jochems
