= Mottige Janus =

1922 film

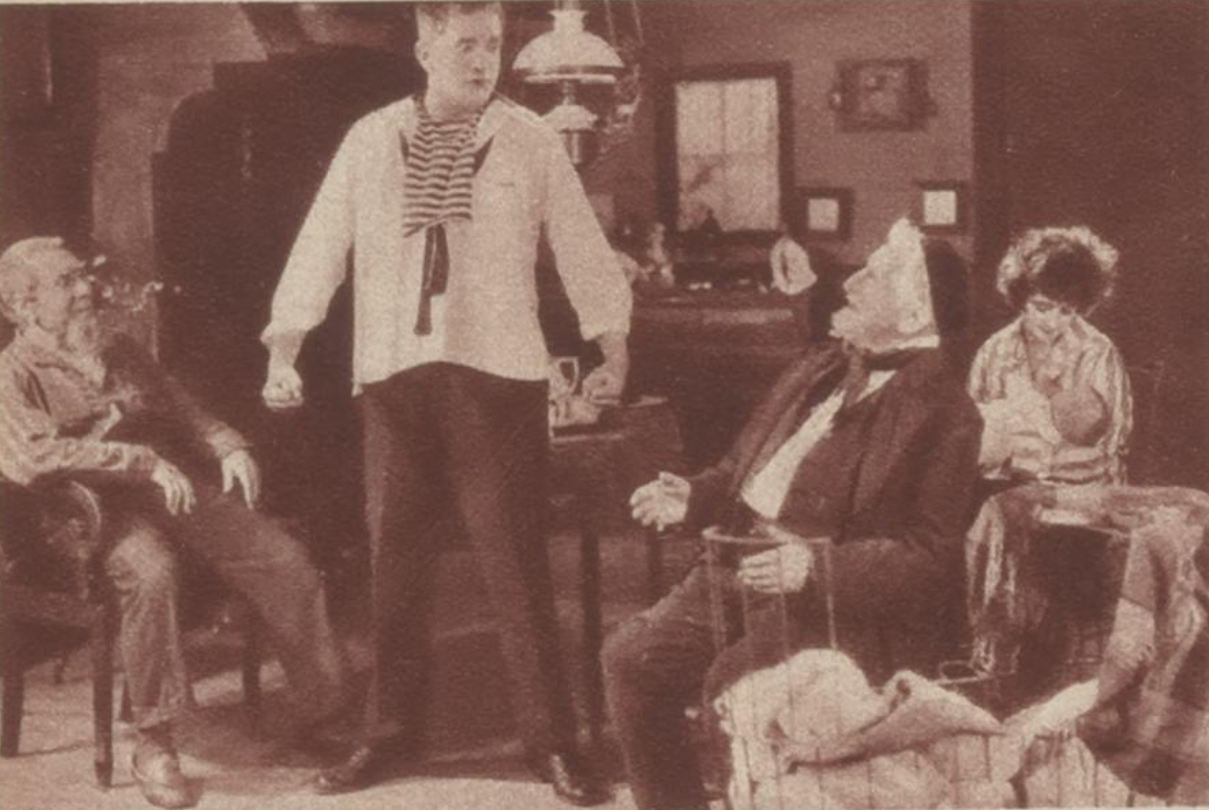
- Directed by: Maurits Binger
- Written by: Maurits Binger; A. Werumeus Buning
- Production company: Hollandia Film
- Release date: 4 August 1922
- Running time: 70 minutes
- Country: Netherlands
- Language: Silent

Mottige Janus is a 1922 Dutch silent drama film directed by Maurits Binger.

== Cast ==
- Maurits de Vries - Janus Rechtsom, de Mottige
- Kitty Kluppell - Lena Doorn
- Meyer van Beem - Nathan
- August Van den Hoeck - Gijs Rechtsom
- Pierre Perin - Duvion
- Koos Speenhoff
- Frits Bouwmeester - Frans van Klarenberghe
- Marie de Clermont
- Cesarine Prinz
- Ka Bos
- Feiko Boersma
