= The Inseparables =

1929 British film

- Swedish poster
- Directed by: Adelqui Migliar; John Stafford
- Written by: Giuseppe Guarino; Adelqui Migliar; John Stafford
- Produced by: Adelqui Migliar
- Starring: Elissa Landi; Patrick Aherne; Annette Benson; Jerrold Robertshaw
- Production company: Whitehall Films
- Distributed by: Warner Brothers
- Release date: March 1929
- Running time: 6,586 feet
- Country: United Kingdom
- Languages: Silent; English intertitles

The Inseparables is a 1929 British silent romance film directed by Adelqui Migliar and John Stafford and starring Elissa Landi, Patrick Aherne and Annette Benson. It was filmed at the Whitehall Studios at Elstree.

== Plot ==
A smuggler falls in love with a gypsy girl he meets, but she seems to prefer his companion.

== Cast ==
- Elissa Landi as Velda
- Patrick Aherne as Laurie Weston
- Annette Benson as Adrienne
- Jerrold Robertshaw as Sir Reginald Farleigh
- Gabriel Gabrio as Pietro
- Fred Rains as Alexander Figg

== Bibliography ==
- Low, Rachel, ed. (1997). The History of British Film: Volume IV, 1918–1929. Routledge. ISBN 9780415156493.
