= Sophie Hoechstetter =

German painter, poet, and author

- Born: Sophie Walburga Margaretha Hoechstetter; 15 August 1873; Pappenheim, German Empire
- Died: 4 April 1943 (aged 69); Dachau, Nazi Germany
- Occupations: writer, poet, artist

Sophie Walburga Margaretha Hoechstetter (15 August 1873 – 4 April 1943) was a German painter, poet, and author.

Hoechstetter was born in Pappenheim as the youngest daughter of a pharmacist. She wrote numerous novels and poems. She admired George Gordon Byron and Johann Wolfgang von Goethe. Hoechstetter died in Dachau on the farm of Carl Olof and Elly Petersen. She was buried in the St. Gallus Church in Pappenheim.
