= Anglo-Hollandia =

British-Dutch film production company

Anglo–Hollandia
- Founded: 1919
- Defunct: 1923
- Successor: Hollandia Films
- Headquarters: United Kingdom; Netherlands

Anglo-Hollandia was a British-Dutch film production company which operated between 1919 and 1923 during the silent film era. It had its roots in the existing Dutch company Hollandia Films and attempted to produce films with appeal to both Britain and the Netherlands.

== Background ==
Hollandia was based in the city of Haarlem and was the only Dutch producer of significant scale during the era. It had operated since 1912 but following the First World War it felt constrained by the limits of the relatively small Dutch market and saw the move as a means to break into the much larger British market. The scheme was driven by the company's managing director Maurits Binger.

== Production and decline ==
The company produced films featuring Anglo-Dutch casts with the Haarlem studios or the Dutch countryside standing in for British settings. Occasionally Walthamstow Studios in London were also used. Many of the film's stories were based on plays or popular novels. The company's productions were distributed by Granger Films.

Like many other production outfits the company struggled to survive the downturn in British filmmaking that culminated in the Slump of 1924. The company ceased to exist when Binger died in 1923, although there were several attempts to revive it.

== Selected filmography ==
- The Little Hour of Peter Wells (1920)
- John Heriot's Wife (1920)
- As God Made Her (1920)
- The Skin Game (1921)
- Blood Money (1921)
- Laughter and Tears (1921)
- Circus Jim (1922)

== Bibliography ==
- Low, Rachael. The History of the British Film, 1918-1929. George Allen & Unwin, 1971.
