= Jan Feith =

Dutch writer (1875–1944)

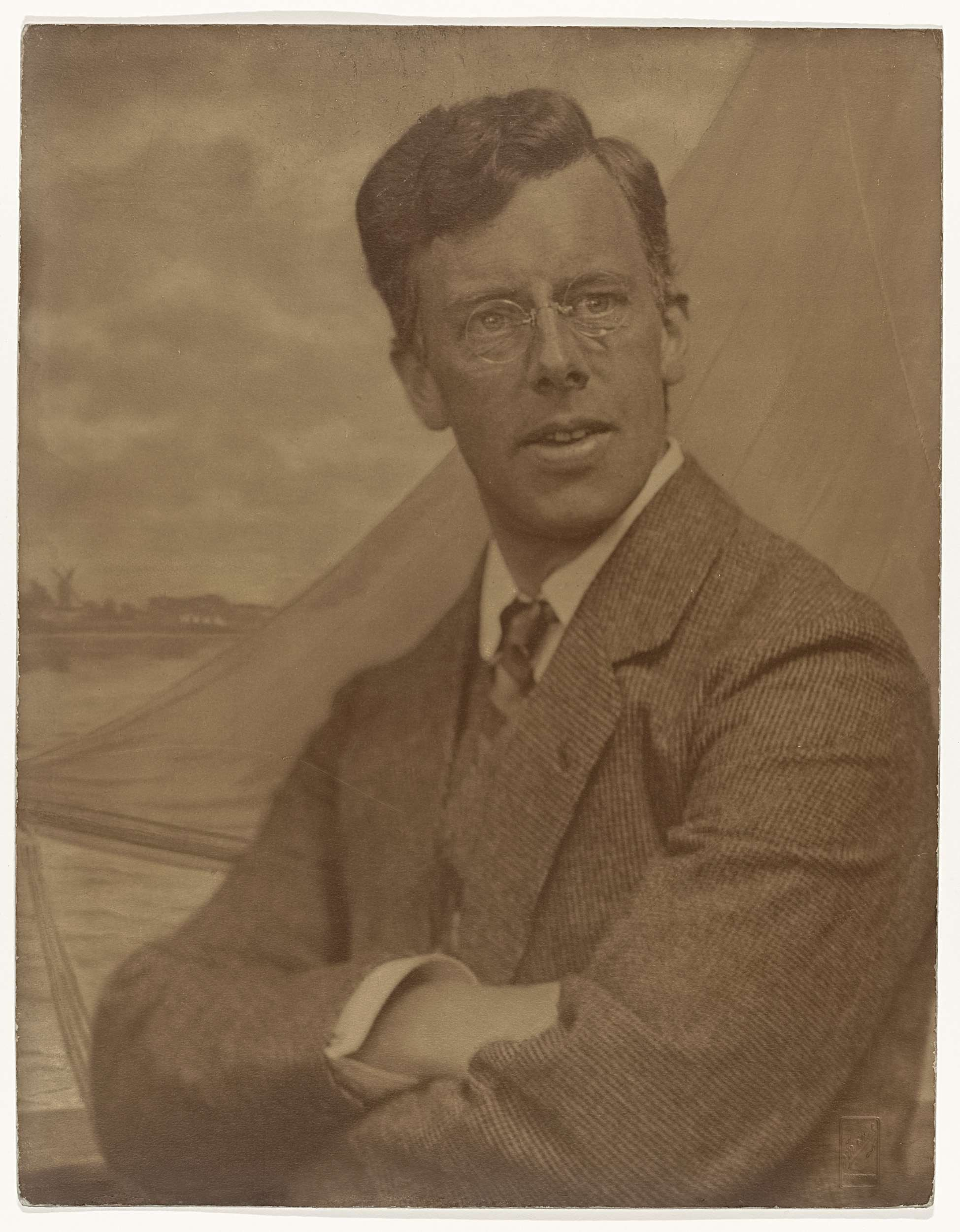
- Jan Feith in 1913
- Born: 12 May 1874; Amsterdam, Netherlands
- Died: 2 September 1944 (aged 70); The Hague, Netherlands
- Occupation: Writer

Jan Feith (12 May 1874 – 2 September 1944) was a Dutch writer. His work was part of the literature event in the art competition at the 1932 Summer Olympics. In his younger years he was an accomplished sportsman. He celebrated some minor victories in cycling and speed skating, sports in which his friend Jaap Eden was the champion of his age.
