= Via Mala (novel) =

1934 novel by John Knittel

- Author: John Knittel
- Language: German
- Genre: Novel
- Publisher: W. Krüger
- Publication date: 1934

Via Mala is a novel by the Swiss writer John Knittel, which was first published in 1934. After the disappearance of a tyrannical sawmill owner in a village in Switzerland, his family is widely suspected of having murdered him.

The title Via Mala refers to the Viamala, a historic route through the Rhine canyon in Switzerland. Literally, it means bad path. All main characters in the novel walk on a bad path, not only the miller Jonas Lauretz, but also his family, guilty or not, and even the judge.

The criminal story is based on a case of murder reported from the Obermühle (Upper Mill) in Kirchensittenbach, Bavaria, in 1817.

== Adaptations ==
The novel was turned into a film Via Mala directed by Josef von Báky during the Nazi era. The film had a troubled production and was released only a month before the end of the Nazi regime. The film was remade in 1961 and a television adaptation Via Mala was broadcast in 1985.
