= Laughter and Tears (1921 film) =

1921 film

- Directed by: B. E. Doxat-Pratt
- Written by: Adelqui Migliar
- Production company: Anglo-Hollandia
- Release date: 27 September 1921
- Running time: 85 minutes
- Countries: United Kingdom; Netherlands
- Language: Silent

Laughter and Tears (Dutch: Een lach en een traan, also known as Circus Jim) is a 1921 British-Dutch silent drama film directed by B. E. Doxat-Pratt. The film is extant in copies at the British Film Institute(BFI) and the Nederlands Filmmuseum.

== Cast ==
- Evelyn Brent - Pierrette
- Adelqui Migliar - Mario Mari
- Dorothy Fane - Countess Maltakoff
- E. Story Gofton - Adolpho
- Maudie Dunham - Zizi
- Bert Darley - Ferrado
- Nico De Jong - Police commissioner
- Norman Doxat-Pratt
- Reginald Garton - Georgio Lario
