= As God Made Her =

1920 Dutch film

- Directed by: Maurits Binger; B. E. Doxat-Pratt
- Written by: B. E. Doxat-Pratt; Helen Prothero-Lewis
- Produced by: Maurits Binger
- Release date: 13 May 1920
- Running time: 119 minutes
- Countries: Netherlands, UK
- Language: Silent

As God Made Her (Dutch: Zoo als ik ben) is a 1920 Dutch silent film directed by Maurits Binger.

== Cast ==
- Mary Odette - Rachel Higgins
- Henry Victor - Seward Pendyne
- Adelqui Migliar - Sir Richard Pendyne
- Lola Cornero - Lady Muriel Pendyne
- Norman Doxat-Pratt - Zoontje van Rachel en Seward
- Marie Spiljar - Guineveve Champernel
- Reginald Lawson
- Leni Marcus
