= Via Mala (1961 film) =

1961 film

- Directed by: Paul May
- Written by: John Knittel (novel); Kurt Heuser; Paul May
- Produced by: Artur Brauner
- Starring: Gert Fröbe; Joachim Hansen; Christine Kaufmann; Christian Wolff
- Cinematography: Richard Angst
- Edited by: Walter Wischniewsky
- Music by: Rolf A. Wilhelm
- Production company: CCC Film
- Distributed by: Gloria Film
- Release date: 9 August 1961
- Running time: 93 minutes
- Country: West Germany
- Language: German

Via Mala is a 1961 West German drama film directed by Paul May and starring Gert Fröbe, Joachim Hansen and Christine Kaufmann. It is an adaptation of the 1934 novel Via Mala by John Knittel, which had previously been made into a film in 1945. After a tyrannical father in a small Swiss village is killed, almost everyone he knows comes under suspicion of having murdered him.

== Cast ==
- Gert Fröbe as Jonas Lauretz
- Joachim Hansen as Andreas von Richenau
- Christine Kaufmann as Sylvia Lauretz
- Christian Wolff as Niklas Lauretz
- Anita Höfer as Hanna Lauretz
- Edith Schultze-Westrum as Mutter Lauretz
- Joseph Offenbach as Knecht Jöry
- Anne-Marie Blanc as Frau von Richenau
- Rudolf Forster as Maler Matthias
- Paul Henckels as Dr. Gutknecht
- Heinrich Gretler as Amtmann Bonatsch
- Margrit Weiler as Kunigunde Meier
- Claus Wilcke as Henry Scherz
- Alexa von Porembsky as Wirtin Gumpers
- Werner Buttler as Gendarm Dieterli

== Bibliography ==
- Reimer, Robert C.; Reimer, Carol J. (2010). The A to Z of German Cinema. Scarecrow Press. ISBN 978-1-4617-3186-3.
