= Maurits Binger =

Dutch film director

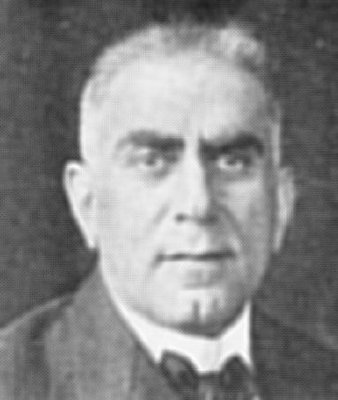
- Born: 5 April 1868; Haarlem, Netherlands
- Died: 9 April 1923 (aged 55); Wiesbaden, Germany
- Occupations: Film director Film producer Screenwriter
- Years active: 1913–1922

Maurits Binger (5 April 1868 – 9 April 1923) was a Dutch film director, producer, and screenwriter of the silent era. He directed 39 films between 1913 and 1922 and is considered one of the pioneers of fictional films in the Netherlands. Binger's studio and base of operations was in Haarlem, North Holland. Between 1919 and 1923, he served as managing director of Anglo-Hollandia, an attempt to break into the larger British market. There is a film institute in the Netherlands in his name. He is sometimes referred to as Maurice Binger.

== Filmography ==
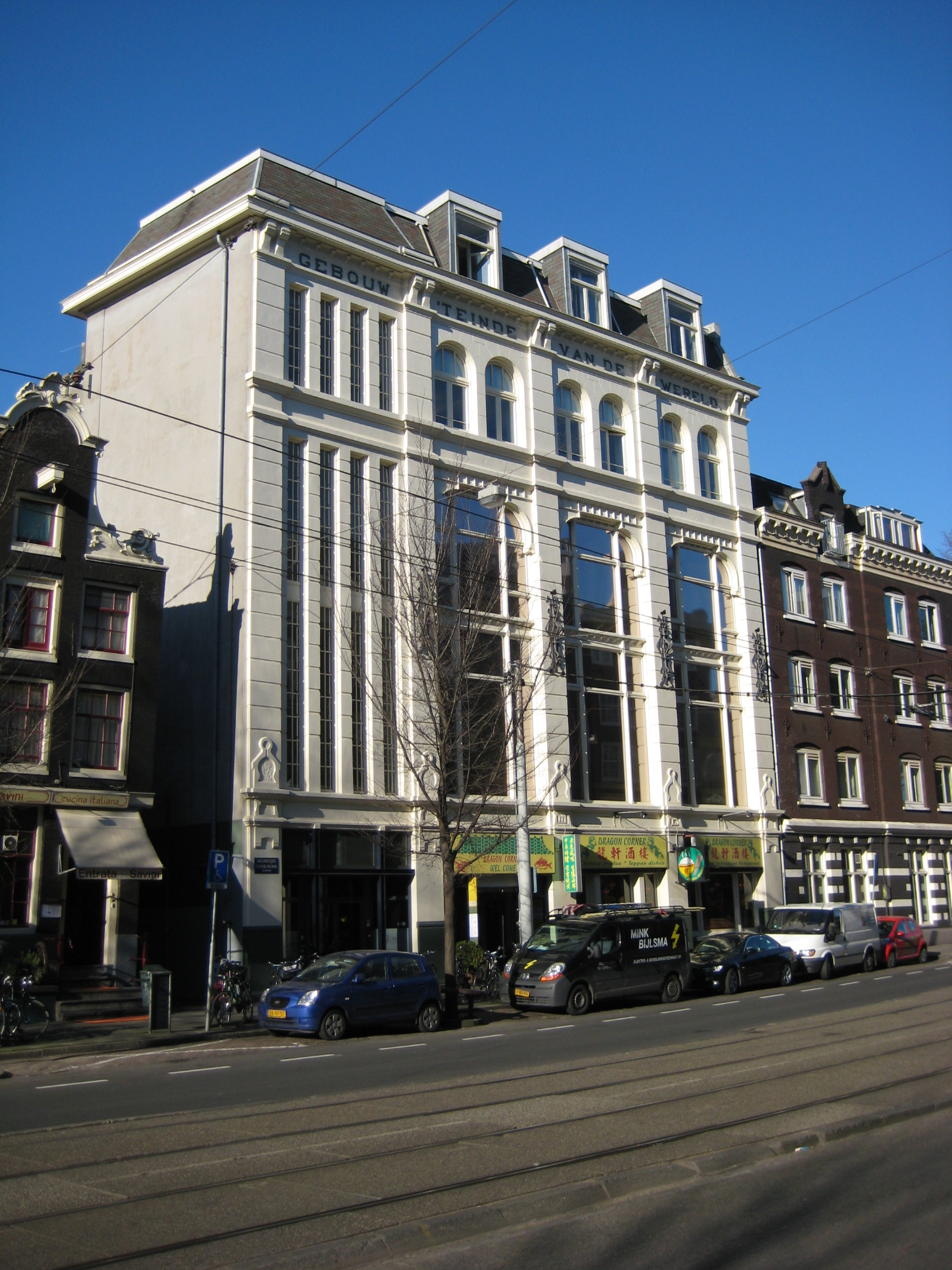
The film institute

- De leugen van Pierrot (1922)
- Mottige Janus (1922)
- De jantjes (1922)
- Rechten der jeugd (1921)
- De zwarte tulp (1921)
- Sister Brown (1921)
- Onder spiritistischen dwang (1921)
- De heldendaad van Peter Wells (1921)
- John Heriot's Wife (1920)
- As God Made Her (1920)
- Fate's Plaything (1920)
- Het verborgen leven (1920)
- Schakels (1920)
- Zonnetje (1919)
- De damescoupeur (1919)
- Een Carmen van het Noorden (1919)
- Het goudvischje (1919)
- Amerikaansche meisjes (1918)
- Oorlog en vrede - 1918 (1918)
- Op hoop van zegen (1918)
- Oorlog en vrede - 1916 (1918)
- Oorlog en vrede - 1914 (1918)
- Toen 't licht verdween (1918)
- De kroon der schande (1918)
- Ulbo Garvema (1917)
- Gouden ketenen (1917)
- Madame Pinkette & Co (1917)
- Het geheim van Delft (1917)
- La renzoni (1916)
- Majoor Frans (1916)
- Liefdesoffer (1916)
- Vogelvrij (1916)
- Het geheim van den vuurtoren (1916)
- Liefdesstrijd (1915)
- De vrouw Clasina (1915)
- Het geheim van het slot arco (1915)
- De vloek van het testament (1915)
- Zijn viool (1914)
- De levende ladder (1913)
