= Via Mala (1945 film) =

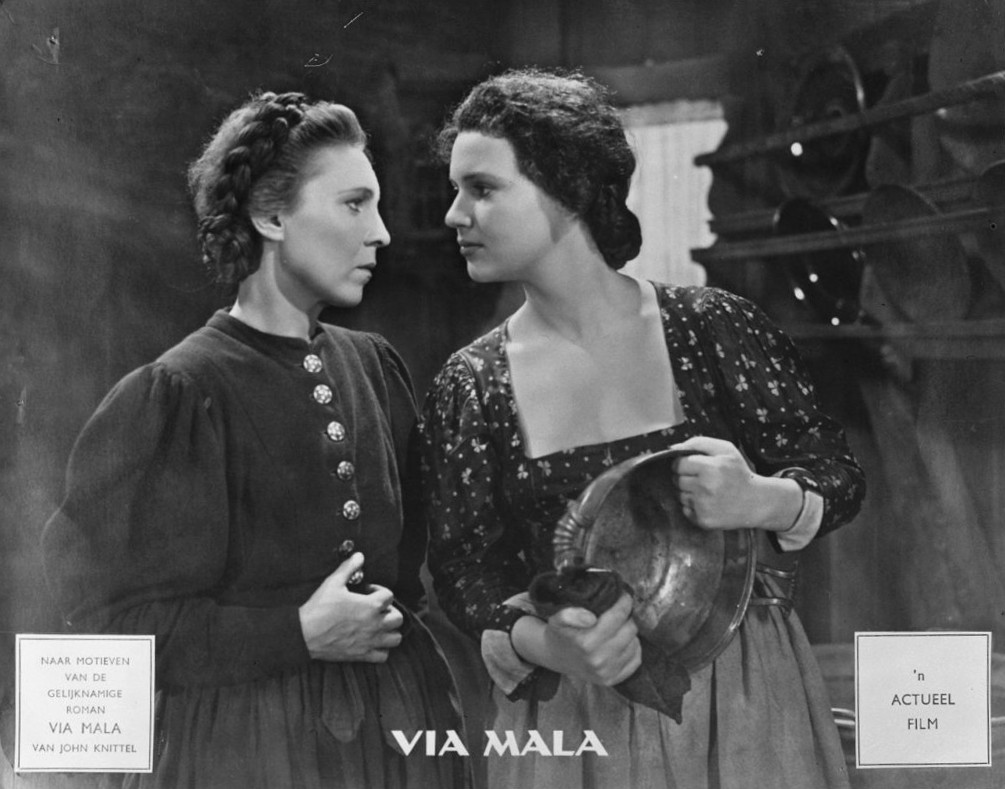
- Directed by: Josef von Báky
- Written by: John Knittel (novel); Thea von Harbou
- Starring: Karin Hardt; Carl Wery; Viktor Staal; Hilde Körber
- Cinematography: Carl Hoffmann
- Edited by: Wolfgang Becker
- Music by: Georg Haentzschel
- Production company: Universum Film AG
- Distributed by: Universum Film AG
- Release date: 7 April 1945
- Running time: 108 minutes
- Country: Germany
- Language: German

Via Mala is a 1945 German drama film directed by Josef von Báky and starring Karin Hardt, Carl Wery and Viktor Staal. It is an adaptation of the 1934 novel Via Mala by John Knittel. It was released in April 1945, a month before the unconditional surrender of Germany. The film is visually expressionist, something comparatively rare during the Nazi era.

== Synopsis ==
In a rural village, the tyrannical Jonas Lauretz intimidates his family, mistress and neighbours. After he disappears one night, it is widely believed that his eldest daughter, Silvelie, has murdered him. A new investigating judge arrives in the village, he falls in love with Silvelie. He becomes torn between his love for her and his duty to investigate the potential crime. Eventually it emerges that it was not Silvelie who murdered Jonas Lauretz but the village innkeeper Bündner. He is forgiven by everyone because they all shared his desire to murder him.

== Production ==
John Knittel's Swiss novel Via Mala had been released in 1934 and become a major international success. The film rights were first acquired in 1941, but the period of production was lengthy and troubled. The screenplay by Thea von Harbou was first submitted to the censor on 21 May 1941, but was not passed until 28 February 1942. The Minister of Propaganda Joseph Goebbels then halted the project because it was "too gloomy" It was revived a year later, and in 1943 filming began at the Babelsberg Studios in Berlin and on location in Mayrhofen in Tyrol. A variety of further delays meant that the finished film was not ready until March 1944. This was still deemed unsatisfactory, and several scenes were re-shot. The ending moved away from that of the novel, where all family members except Silvelie were revealed to have taken part in the murder. It was finally submitted to the censor in January 1945.

== Release ==
The film's release was also troubled. It was passed by the censors on 9 March 1945, but this was rescinded only ten days later. The downbeat plot was considered unsuitable in light of the recent war situation, as German forces were being pushed back on all fronts and escapist films were preferred. It was finally agreed that the film could go on general release only outside Germany.

The film premièred in Mayrhofen on 7 April 1945. It was not released in Germany until 16 January 1948, when it had its première in East Berlin.

== Cast ==
- Karin Hardt as Silvelie
- Carl Wery as Jonas Lauretz
- Viktor Staal as Andreas von Richenau
- Hilde Körber as Hanna
- Hildegard Grethe as Frau Lauretz
- Albert Florath as Der Amtmann
- Ferdinand Asper as Gast bei Bündner
- Karl Hellmer as Jöry
- Malte Jäger as Nikolaus
- Carl Kuhlmann as Lukas Bündner
- Ludwig Linkmann as Der Amtsdiener
- Renate Mannhardt as Kuni
- Heinz Günther Puhlmann as Angestellter von Bündner
- F.W. Schröder-Schrom as Gast bei Bündner
- Franz Lichtenauer as Gast bei Bündner
- Klaus Pohl as Gast bei Bündner
- Georg Vogelsang as Lechner-Bauer
- Walter Werner as Dorfarzt

== Bibliography ==
- O'Brien, Mary-Elizabeth. Nazi Cinema as Enchantment. The Politics of Entertainment in the Third Reich. Camden House, 2006.
