= List of Dutch films of the 1930s =

This is a list of films produced in the Netherlands during the 1930s. The films were produced in the Dutch language.

| Title | Year | Director | Cast | Genre | Notes |
|---|---|---|---|---|---|
1930
| Zeemansvrouwen | 1930 | Henk Kleinmann | | Fisherman's drama | First Dutch sound film |
1931
| De Sensatie van de Toekomst | 1931 | Dimitri Buchowetzki | | Dutch version of Paramount movie Television | |
1932
| Terra Nova | 1932 | Gerard Rutten | Adolphe Engers | Fisherman's drama | |
1934
| Willem van Oranje | 1934 | Jan Theunissen | Cor van der Lugt Melsert | Drama; History | |
| The Tars | | Jaap Speyer | Willy Castello | Drama; Comedy | |
| De Vier Mullers | | Rudolf Meinert | | | |
| Dood Water | | Gerard Rutten | Jan Musch, Theo de Maal | Fisherman's drama | |
| Het Meisje met den Blauwen Hoed | | Rudolf Meinert | Truus van Aalten; Willem van der Veer | Comedy | |
| Op Hoop van zegen | | Alex Benno | Esther de Boer-van Rijk, Jan van Ees | Fisherman's drama | Third film version in 20 years |
| Bleeke Bet | | Alex Benno; Richard Oswald | Herman Bouber | Comedy | |
| Malle Gevallen | | Jaap Speyer | Johan Kaart, Louis Borel | Comedy | |
1935
| Op Stap | 1935 | Ernst Winar | Louis Davids | | |
| Het Mysterie van de Mondscheinsonate | | Kurt Geron | Louis de Bree, Enny Meunier | Mystery; Crime | |
| De Familie van mijn Vrouw | | Jaap Speyer | Johan Kaart, Sylvain Poons | Comedy | |
| De Kribbebijter | | Henry Koster; Ernst Winar | Cor Ruys; Hein van der Niet | Drama | |
| Fietje Peters, Poste Restante | | Victor Janson | Dolly Bouwmeester, Herman Tholen | Comedy; Drama | German co-production |
| Suikerfreule | | Haro van Peski | | | |
1936
| Klokslag Twaalf | 1936 | Leo Joannon | Louis de Bree, Fien de la Mar | Drama | |
| Merijntje Gijzens Jeugd | | Kurt Gerron | Marcel Krols, A.M.de Jong | Drama | |
| The Trouble With Money | | Max Ophüls | Herman Bouber; Matthieu van Eysden | Comedy | |
| Young Hearts | | Charles Huguenot van der Linden; Heinz Josephson | Rini Otte; Leo den Hartog | | |
| Kermisgasten | | Jaap Speyer | | | |
| Rubber | | Gerard Rutten | | | |
| Een Zomerzotheid | | Hans van Meerten | Leo de Hartogh | | |
| Lentelied | | Simon Koster | Ank van der Moer | | |
| Oranje Hein | | Max Nosseck | | | |
| 't Was Eén April | | Douglas Sirk, Jacques van Tol | Jacques Van Bylevelt, Tilly Perin-Bouwmeester | Comedy | |
1937
| Pygmalion | 1937 | Ludwig Berger | Lily Bouwmeester | | |
| Op een Avond in Mei | | Jaap Speyer | Johan Elsensohn, Cissy van Bennekom | Comedy; Drama | |
| De Man Zonder Hart | | Leo Joannon | Louis de Bree, Dolly Mollinger | Drama | |
| The Three Wishes | | Kurt Gerron | Mimi Boesnach | | |
1938
| Forty Years | 1938 | Johan de Meester; Edmond T. Grevile | Lily Bouwmeester | | |
| Vadertje Langbeen | | Frederic Zelnik | Lily Bouwmeester | | |
1939
| Wilton's Zoo | 1939 | Douglas Sirk | Annie van Ees | | |
| Tomorrow It Will Be Better | | Frederic Zelnik | Lily Bouwmeester | | |
| De Spooktrein | | Karel Lamac | Fien de La Mar | | |
| De Big van het Regiment | | Max Nosseck | | | |
