= Louis Davids =

Dutch actor, singer, comedian and revue artist

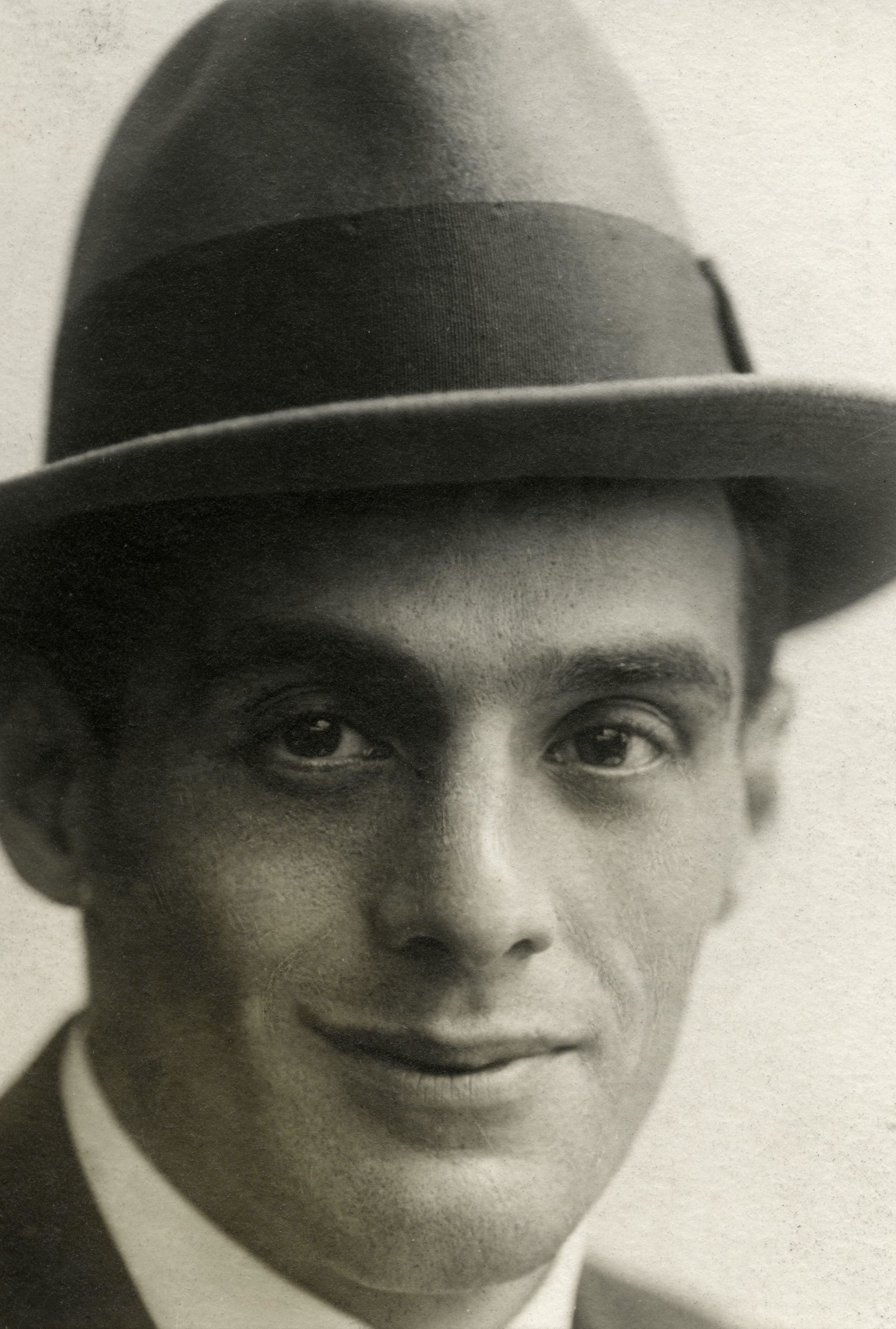
- Davids (1919)
- Born: Simon David; 19 December 1883; Rotterdam, Netherlands
- Died: 1 July 1939 (aged 55); Amsterdam, Netherlands
- Known for: Cabaret, variety shows

Signature
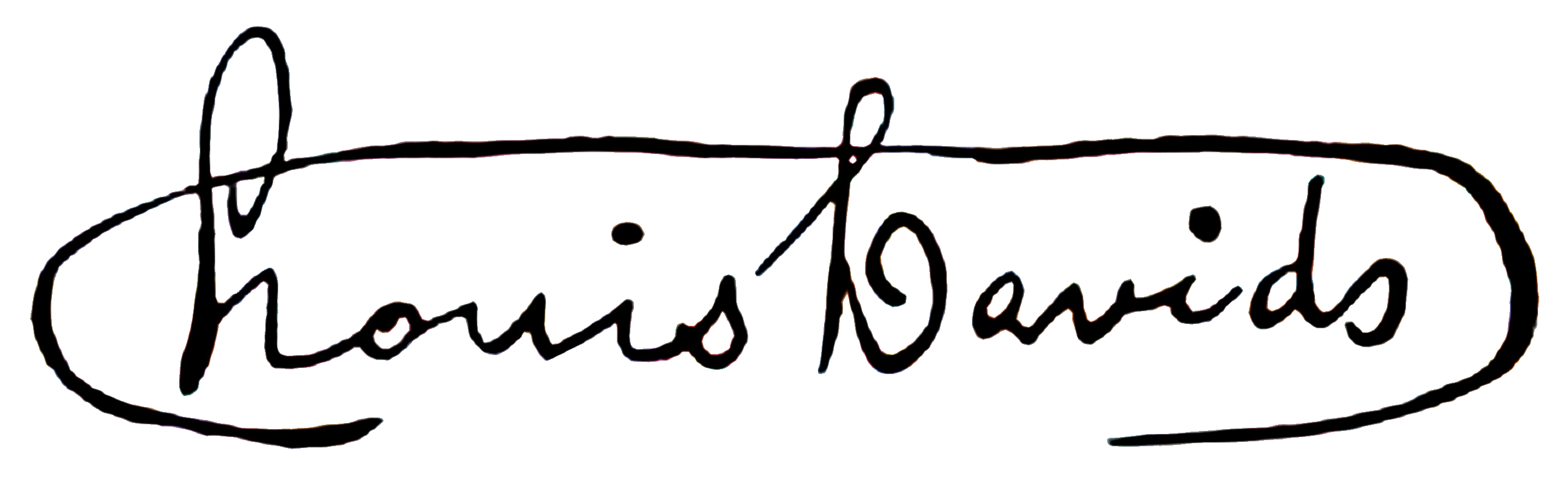

Louis Davids (born Simon David; 19 December 1883 – 1 July 1939) was a Dutch actor, singer, comedian and revue artist. He is widely considered one of the biggest names in Dutch performing arts.

== Biography ==
=== Early years ===
Davids was born in the Raamstraat in the infamous Rotterdam Zandstraatbuurt as the son of comedian and café owner Levie David (1857–1906) and Francina Terveen (1858–1927) in a poor Jewish family of four children. Louis's teacher, Master Thorn, was a great variety show enthusiast and passed this on to his student. Louis started performing at the age of five singing songs at the Groningen funfair, standing on a pillar dressed in a suit and top hat. He gained the reputation of a child prodigy and soon achieved considerable success. His big break came at seven years old, when he got a contract with theater Tivoli on the Westerstraat, where he performed under the name Louis Davids Jr. His successes regularly led to fights between Louis and his father, who would often refer to him as "the little aristocrat".

Due to the mounting tensions, father Davids decided that it was better if his son no longer worked with him, after which Louis formed a duo with his sister Rika. The two managed to conquer a place in theater Pschorr. They sang songs like Een reisje langs de Rijn (A trip along the Rhine) and Zandvoort bij de zee (Zandvoort by the sea). In Carré, Duo Davids subsequently managed to set up a successful revue program under the direction of theater director Frits van Haarlem. Their performances in Carré provided an important breakthrough in Louis' career, he was now really starting to make a name for himself as an artist.

=== Revue star ===
Louis married Rebecca 'Betsy' Kokernoot, in 1906. Shortly before the birth of his daughter, Louis left for England. He was invited by Frits van Haarlem, who wanted to realize a grand revue and had decided to gain inspiration for the project in London. The result of the expedition was the first major Dutch revue, Koning 'Kziezoowat in Amsterdam, which Davids wrote together with Van Haarlem, and in which Rika and himself played the leads. The revue was performed over a hundred times in Carré and was an overwhelming success. After this, Louis and Rika put an end to their collaboration with Van Haarlem and switched to the more prestigious revue of Henri ter Hall.

When Rika married Austrian magician Joachim Lifschütz, the two moved to England and she left the duo. It was a blow to Davids, who was so attuned to his sister, that at first he refused to form a duo again. His younger sister Henriëtte managed to persuade him with great difficulty. Against all odds, the new Duo Davids was even more successful than the old. Their collaboration would last for years, during which they not only regularly performed in Carré, but also toured Germany and England (1910–1911).

=== He, She and the Piano ===
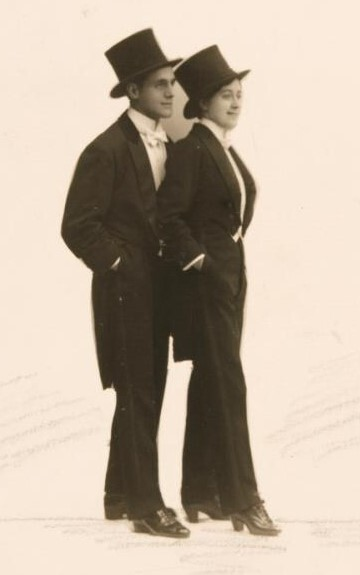
Louis Davids and Margie Morris in "He, She and the Piano", 1920

During a tour of England, Louis became acquainted with English officer's daughter and artist Margareth Whitefoot, better known as Margie Morris; a talented musician, trained at the conservatory. The two started an affair and in 1913 Morris left the United Kingdom and moved in with Louis in Amsterdam. Betty, however, refused to go through with her husband's requested divorce, leaving them officially married until his death. Until 1922, Margie and Louis formed the duo "He, She and the piano". Margie and Louis had a son in 1915, Louis Jr. In 1919 Morris and Davids went on tour in the Dutch East Indies for eight months. There Davids felt appalled at the suppression of the indigenous population, which prompted him to write the song Rassenhaat (Race hate). In it he was extremely critical of the Dutch colonizers, whom he described as 'The men who mock and abuse, who under the guise of civilization, oppress a nation of millions'.

Davids and Morris wrote a number of famous songs together; not only for the own repertoire but also for musicals by Herman Bouber, such as Bleeke Bet (1917), Oranje Hein (1918) and De Jantjes (1920).

=== The Little Big Man ===
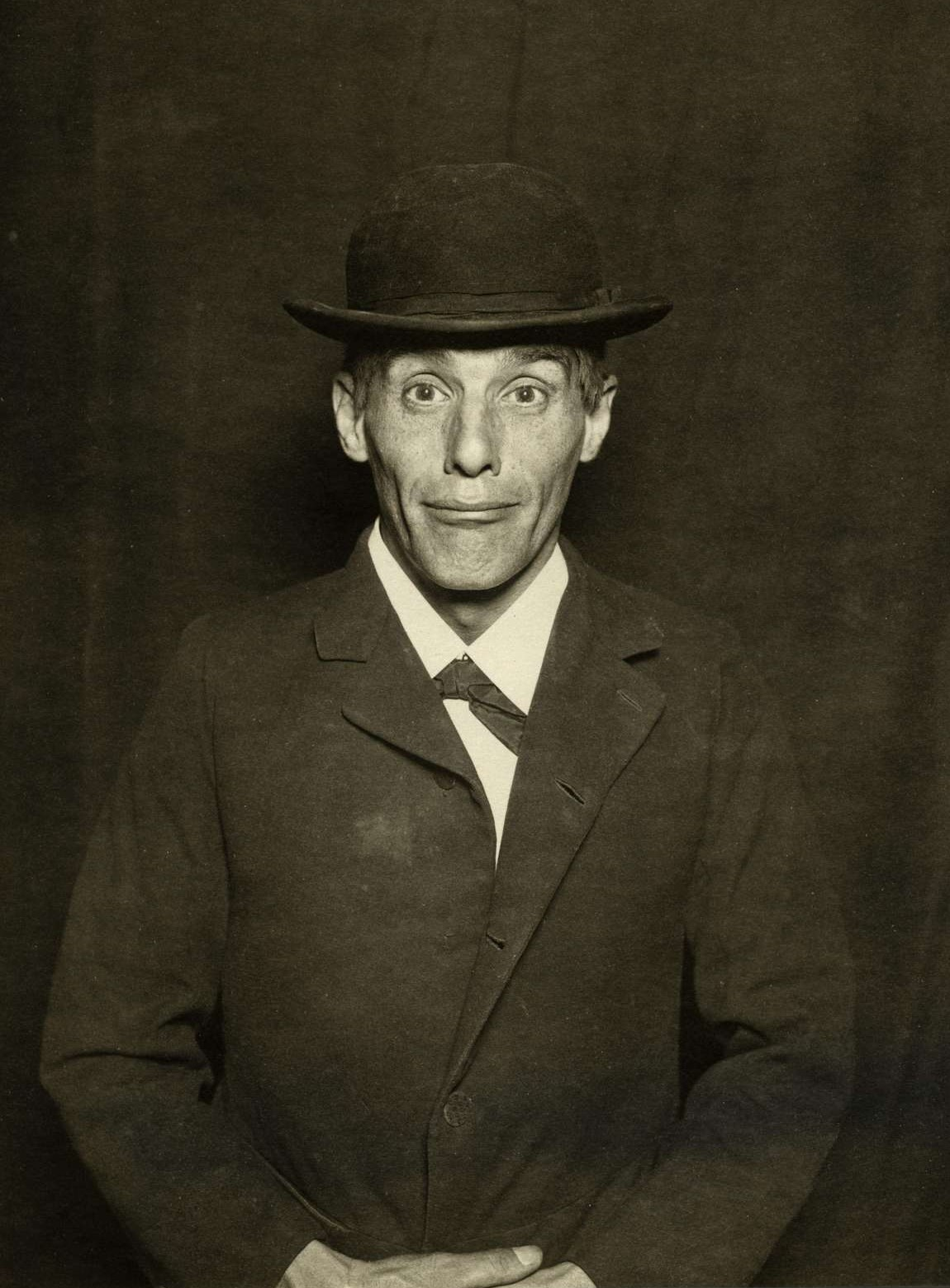
Louis Davids as 'the little man', 1929

In 1926 Davids participated in various shows under the direction of Frits Stapper. In Lach en Vergeet (Smile and forget, 1929) he sang for the first time what would become his best-known song: De Kleine Man (The Little Man), in which he, as a bourgeois man with a bowler hat, sings of the tribulations of the ordinary citizen. Both the song and the accompanying sketch in which Davids' little man was attacked by political propagandists, received much praise. The song earned him the nickname 'de grote kleine man' (the little big man). His relationship with lyricist Jacques van Tol also dates from this period. Van Tol and Davids concluded a copyright agreement; Van Tol would ghostwrite most songtexts for Davids in his Kurhaus Cabaret period (1931–1938).

=== Kurhaus period ===
After the death of Jean-Louis Pisuisse, at whose funeral Davids gave a speech, the Kurhaus at Scheveningen beach, where Pisuisse used to perform, was unsuccessfully in use as a cinema. In 1931, the Zeebad Scheveningen Company contacted Davids. In the years that followed his fame reached a peak and he established his name as the most versatile and appreciated comedian in the Netherlands. In his performances in Scheveningen, as well as his occasional performances in the Amsterdam Leidseplein theater, Davids developed a unique style: songs and conferences interspersed with revue-ish sketches reminiscent of his past in variety entertainment, such as ventriloquism. Of great significance was that Davids gave many gifted Dutch and foreign artists a chance to perform in his shows. Among them were established greats such as Rudolf Nelson and his cabaret from Berlin, but also beginners such as the Cabaret Ping Pong, Martie Verdenius, Wim Kan and Corry Vonk. Wim Sonneveld also started his career at Davids; not yet as an artist, but as a secretary in the office.

In May 1931 Davids went to London to record an album with British bandleader Bert Ambrose at the Queen's Hall for His Master's Voice.

=== Illness and death ===
In 1938 Davids had to leave the Kurhaus Cabaret due to asthma; the illness had troubled him greatly since the early 1920s. Severe asthma attacks were indirectly responsible for his unexpected death at the age of 55 in 1939. The funeral was held on 3 July 1939. Several thousand came to Herman Gorterstraat to bring him their final greetings. Davids was cremated in Westerveld crematory.

== Filmography ==
Year	Title	Role	Notes
1906	Koning 'Kziezoowat in Amsterdam		Film sequences from the stage revue; presumed lost
1915	Fatum	Dance partner	Presumed lost
1915	He, She and the Piano	Himself	Presumed lost
1915	Loop naar den duivel		Presumed lost
1916	Visschersavonturen	Fisherman	Presumed lost
1918	American Girls	Tinus	Also co-director; presumed lost
1919	The Devil in Amsterdam		Presumed lost
1920	Schakels	Jan Duif	Presumed lost
1920	Liefdesintriges	Rene van Straalen	
1921	Menschenwee	Willy Vermeer	
1922	De Jantjes	Blauwe Toon	
1924	Amsterdam bij nacht	Street musician	
1934	De Jantjes	Himself	
1935	Het Nederlandsche Cabaretalbum	Himself	
1935	Op Stap	Janus Fortuin	

== Honours ==
- Knight in de Order of Orange-Nassau, 31 August 1937

== Legacy ==
=== Louis Davids Ring ===
In 1948, in memory of Louis Davids, the municipality of Rotterdam introduced the Louis Davids ring, a prestigious cabaret award. As the last surviving member of the Davids family, sister Henriëtte Davids was the first bearer of the ring. Others were Wim Kan, Herman van Veen and Claudia de Breij.

=== Louis Davids Monument ===
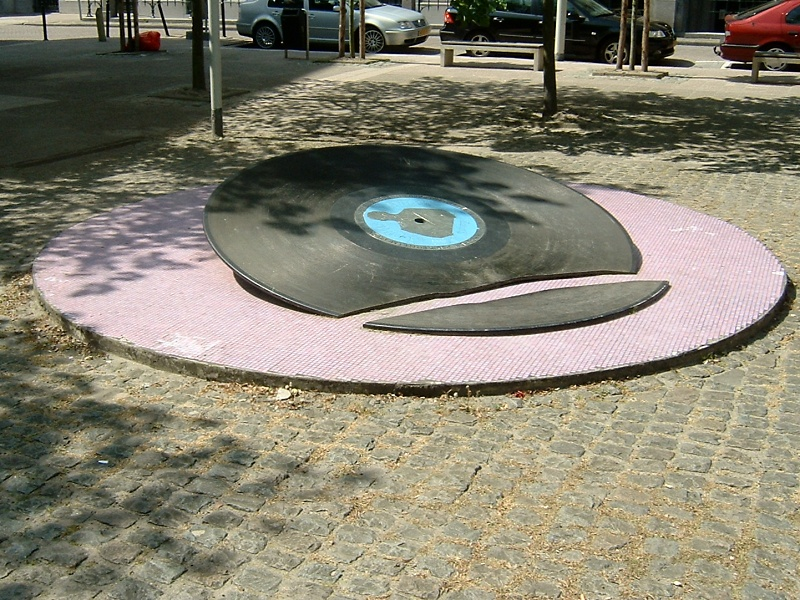
Louis Davids Monument in Rotterdam

At the initiative of a special commemoration committee, the Louis Davids Monument was erected in 1983 on the Raamplein square behind the Rotterdam City Hall, in the neighborhood where Davids was born and spent the first years of life. The 78 rpm painted steel record, with a portrait of Davids and the quote "I hope that when I'm gone, my songs will always be remembered", was designed by Rotterdam-based artist Mathieu Ficheroux.

Because of the construction of the Timmerhuis building and redevelopment of the square, the monument was put in storage for several years. On 24 March 2016 the work was restored and placed back on the redesigned Raamplein. During the unveiling, the book De Zandstraatbuurt en zijn Joodse inwoners ('The Zandstraatbuurt and its Jewish inhabitants') by Hans Schippers, Chris Buitendijk, Albert Ringer and Rob Snijder was presented.

=== Musical ===
On 27 October 1983 the musical De zoon van Louis Davids ('The Son of Louis Davids') premiered, written by Gerben Hellinga and Jacques Klöters on the occasion of David's 100th birthday. Actor Johan Ooms, who had previously played the role of Louis Davids in Hellinga's earlier play Mensch durf te leven about the life of Jean-Louis Pisuisse, returned to the role for the musical. The musical was recorded for Dutch television by director Dimitri Frenkel Frank.

=== Other ===
In 2010 the Netherlands Comedy Theater performed a play about Davids titled Liedjes van Louis Davids.

== See also ==
- De Voetbalmatch
