= De Jantjes =

De Jantjes can refer to:

- De Jantjes (1922 film), a 1922 Dutch film
- De Jantjes (1934 film), a 1934 Dutch film
- De Jantjes (musical), a Dutch musical
