= The Tars =

1934 film

De Jantjes
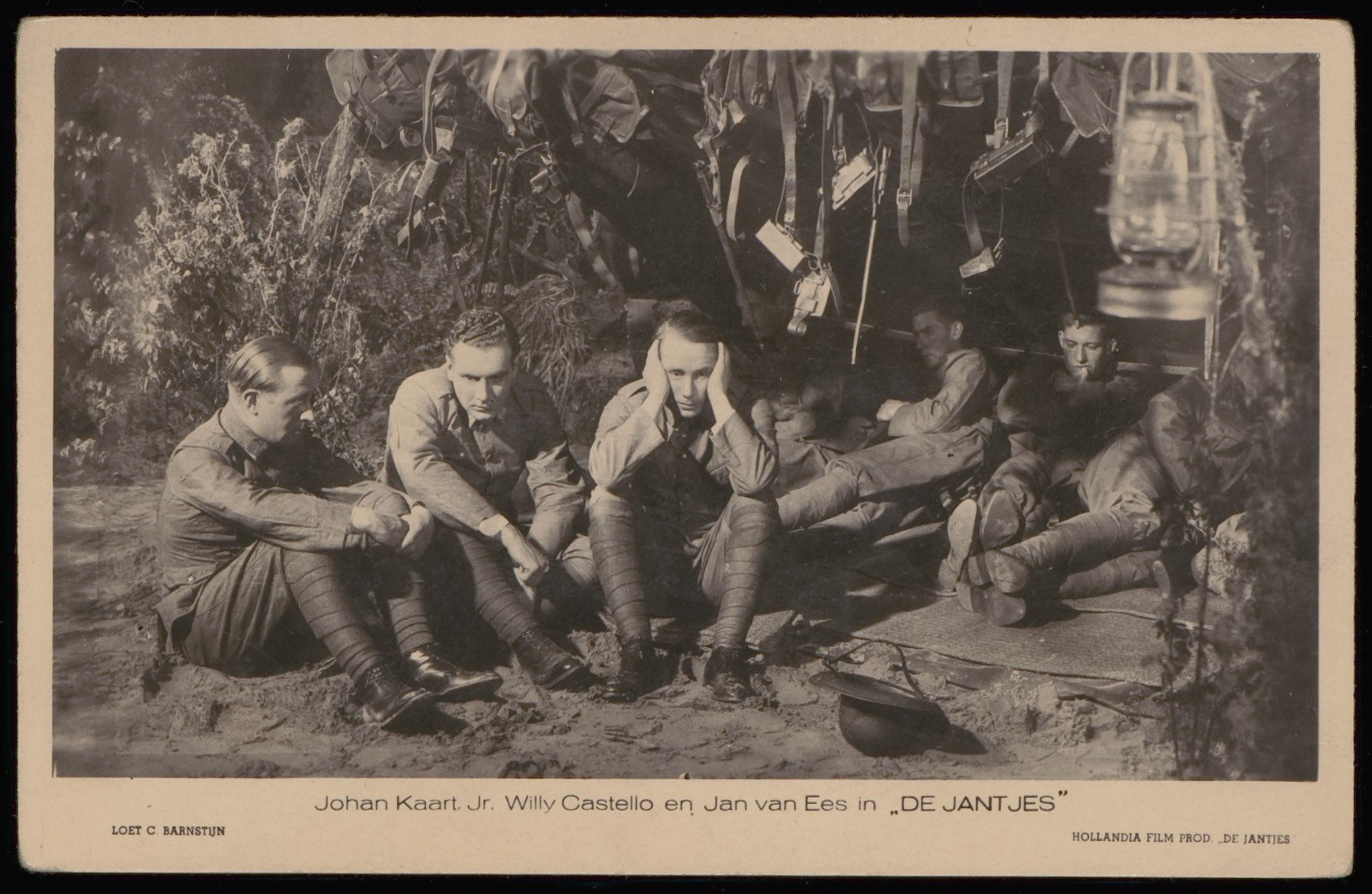
- Directed by: Jaap Speyer
- Written by: Herman Bouber (play); Alex Benno (writer)
- Music by: Jan Broekhuis, Margie Morris, Louis Davids and Rido
- Release date: 9 February 1934
- Running time: 99 minutes
- Country: Netherlands
- Language: Dutch

The Tars or De Jantjes is a 1934 Dutch comedy film drama directed by Jaap Speyer. The film was a remake of the 1922 film of the same name, which itself was based on a 1920-play by Louis Davids and Margie Morris.

== Reception and influence ==
The film was the second Dutch sound film to be released after the 1934 film Willem van Oranje, released just one month earlier. The film became a big commercial success and popularised the genre of Jordaanfilms, a Dutch film-genre popular in the 1930s. Jordaanfilms followed working class protagonists in the impoverished Jordaan-area of Amsterdam who speak and sing in local dialect. The film also led to a romanticized and idolised version of the Jordaan. This imaged existed in Dutch popular culture for most of the 20th century.

== Cast ==
- Willy Castello as Dolle Dries
- Johan Kaart, Jr. as Schele Manus
- Jan van Ees as Blauwe Toon
- Fien de la Mar as Toffe Jans
- Suzie Klein as Blonde Greet
- Cissy van Bennekom as Doortje
- Amsy Moina as Sarina
- Marie van Westerhoven as Moeder Betje
- Aaf Bouber as Tante Piet
- Rika Hopper as Moeder van Blauwe Toon
- Heintje Davids as Na Druppel
- Sylvian Poons as De Mop
- Cor Hermus as Oom Gerrit
- Johan Remmelts as Leendert
- Louis Davids as Cabaretier
