= Bleeke Bet =

Bleeke Bet can refer to:

- Bleeke Bet (1923 film), a 1923 Dutch film
- Bleeke Bet (1934 film), a 1934 Dutch film
