= Margie Morris =

British-born Dutch performer (1892–1983)

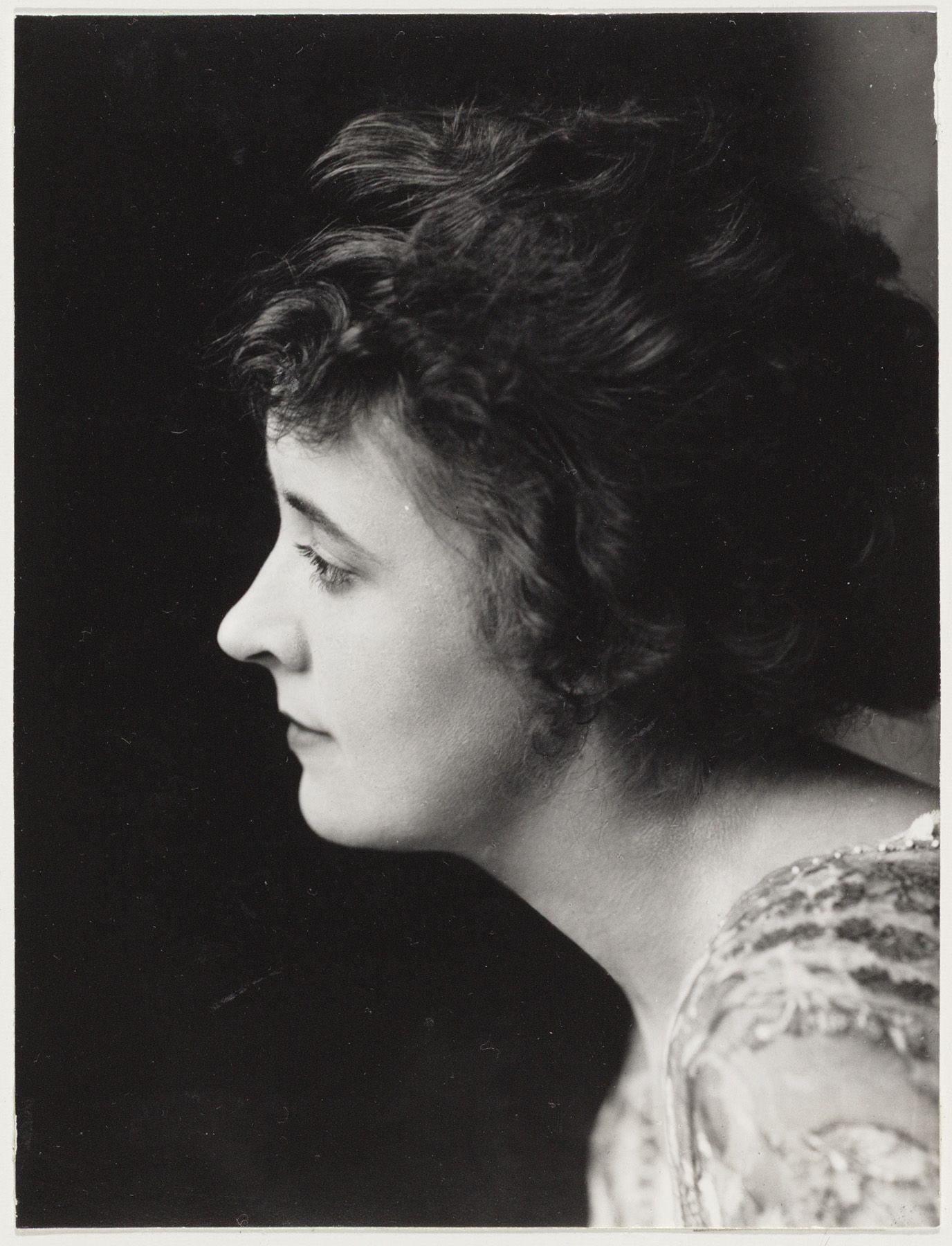
- Margie Morris in 1917
- Born: Margaret Sarah Whitefoot; 24 July 1892; Westminster, England
- Died: 14 January 1983 (aged 90); Grayshott, Hampshire
- Occupations: Stage and silent film actress, revue artist, musician, dancer and singer

Margie Morris (24 July 1892 – 14 January 1983) was an English stage and silent film actress, revue artist, musician, dancer, and singer who worked in the Netherlands during the 1910s and 1920s.

== Early life ==
She was born in Westminster in London in 1892 as Margaret Sarah Whitefoot, the daughter of jeweller and pawnbroker Alfred Victor Whitefoot (1867-1894) and Margaret Christina née Williamson (1869-1958). In 1901 she was a boarder at the girls' school attached to the Convent of Our Lady of Sion in Islington in London. She was then educated at a conservatory and aspired to become a musician. In 1905 her widowed mother married Henry Walter Morris (1867–1934), a travelling salesman for a drapery company and in 1911 she was living with her mother and stepfather at Minard Road in Catford in London. At about this time Morris met the Dutch revue artist Louis Davids at an intimate party for artistes and although her stepfather was against their relationship she moved to the Netherlands with him in 1913 with various sources claiming that she was fleeing from her stepfather's strict upbringing.

== Success in the Netherlands ==
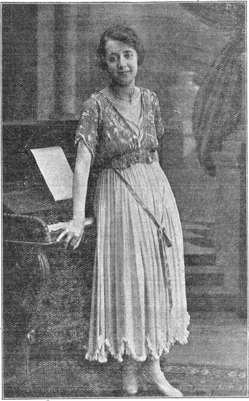
Morris in 1920

Adopting her stepfather's surname, she joined the company of Leon Boedels, director of the Flora Theatre in Amsterdam as a dancer. Meanwhile Morris wrote songs with Davids which they performed on stage under the name 'He, She and the Piano' ( 'Hij, zij en de piano'). Their act was created by chance when one evening the film director Willy Mullens misplaced a movie he had planned to screen to his guests and he invited Davids and Morris to perform and they were given the nickname by the audience. Morris's popularity increased significantly and the duo's comedic repertoire soon became well-known across the Netherlands in what is now known as Levenslied, the Dutch genre of nostalgic sentimental popular music. One of the duo's more famous songs from this period is De Jantjes, which was the basis for a silent film in 1922, and a full motion picture in 1934. When World War I broke out, Davids founded the First Dutch Mobilization Cabaret. Together with Morris they performed for soldiers in Gorinchem.

After the mobilization, Morris and Davids continued the performances of 'He, She and the Piano'. Meanwhile, she played in several revues. In 1915 she gave birth to a son, Louis Davids Jr. (Louis Harry Whitefoot). From then on she focused on writing the music for Herman Bouber's plays such as De Jantjes, Bleeke Bet and Oranje Hein and in 1920 she played the leading role in one of these musicals. Her film career was launched in 1918 with her playing the female lead in two Dutch silent films: Margie in American Girls (1918) and Thérèse in The Devil in Amsterdam (1919). At the premiere of American Girls Morris entertained the audience with songs.

== Later years ==
In 1919 after her brief film career ended Morris went on tour with Louis Davids to the Dutch East Indies. Although the tour was a success their relationship broke up with Davids leaving her in 1922 for actress Tilly van der Does. However, they never lost contact and remained friends until his death in 1939. Morris continued with her songwriting in the late 1920s, composing the music among others for the songs 'You wanted someone to play with, I wanted someone to love' recorded by Johnny Marvin in 1928, and 'I won't believe it's raining (Until I see the rain)' recorded by Tom Frawley and The Georgians in 1929. After this, little is known of Morris's life except that she returned to England, where she lived in Hindhead in Surrey.

Margie Morris died at the Grayshott Nursing Home at Grayshott in Hampshire in 1983 at the age of 90.
