= De Kleine Man =

1929 single by Louis Davids

"De kleine man"

Single by Louis Davids
- A-side: "De Begrafenis van Oome Manus"
- Released: 1929
- Recorded: October 24, 1963
- Studio: Columbia Records
- Genre: Protest song; Comedy
- Length: 2:51
- Label: Columbia Records
- Songwriter: Jacques van Tol

Louis Davids singles chronology
"De Begrafenis Van Oome Manus" (1929)	"De kleine man" (1929)	"Een Liedje Bij De Wieg" (1929)

"De Kleine Man" (translation: The Little Man) is a 1929 Dutch-language protest song, written by Jacques van Tol and first recorded by Louis Davids. During Davids' lifetime it was considered his signature song.

== History ==
Van Tol wrote the song for the revue Lach en Vergeet (1929) by Dutch comedian and singer Louis Davids. The song describes how odd and unfair it is that some people are so rich, while others are poor. It also criticizes funding for unemployed people and how politicians yell at each other and spent millions on military defense, while the average little man has to pay for all this. The original lyrics make reference to U.S. boxer Jack Dempsey who is criticized for earning millions by just having himself pound to pulp, not to mention his opponent.

== Cover versions ==
In 1930 the song was parodied by Kees Pruis as De Kleine Vrouw ('The Little Woman'). Davids spoofed his own song later as De Kleine Hond ('The Little Dog'). During the Second World War, songwriter Jacques Van Tol joined the NSB party and recorded an antisemitic version of the song for the propagandistic radio programme Zondagmiddagcabaret van Paulus de Ruiter (1940-1944).

Other artists who have covered De Kleine Man include Fien de la Mar (1930), Willy Derby (1930), Jetty Pearl (1941), Wim Sonneveld (1959), Henk Elsink (1969), André van Duin (1970), Wim De Craene (1973) and Harry Slinger.
