= Jan Broekhuis =

Dutch composer

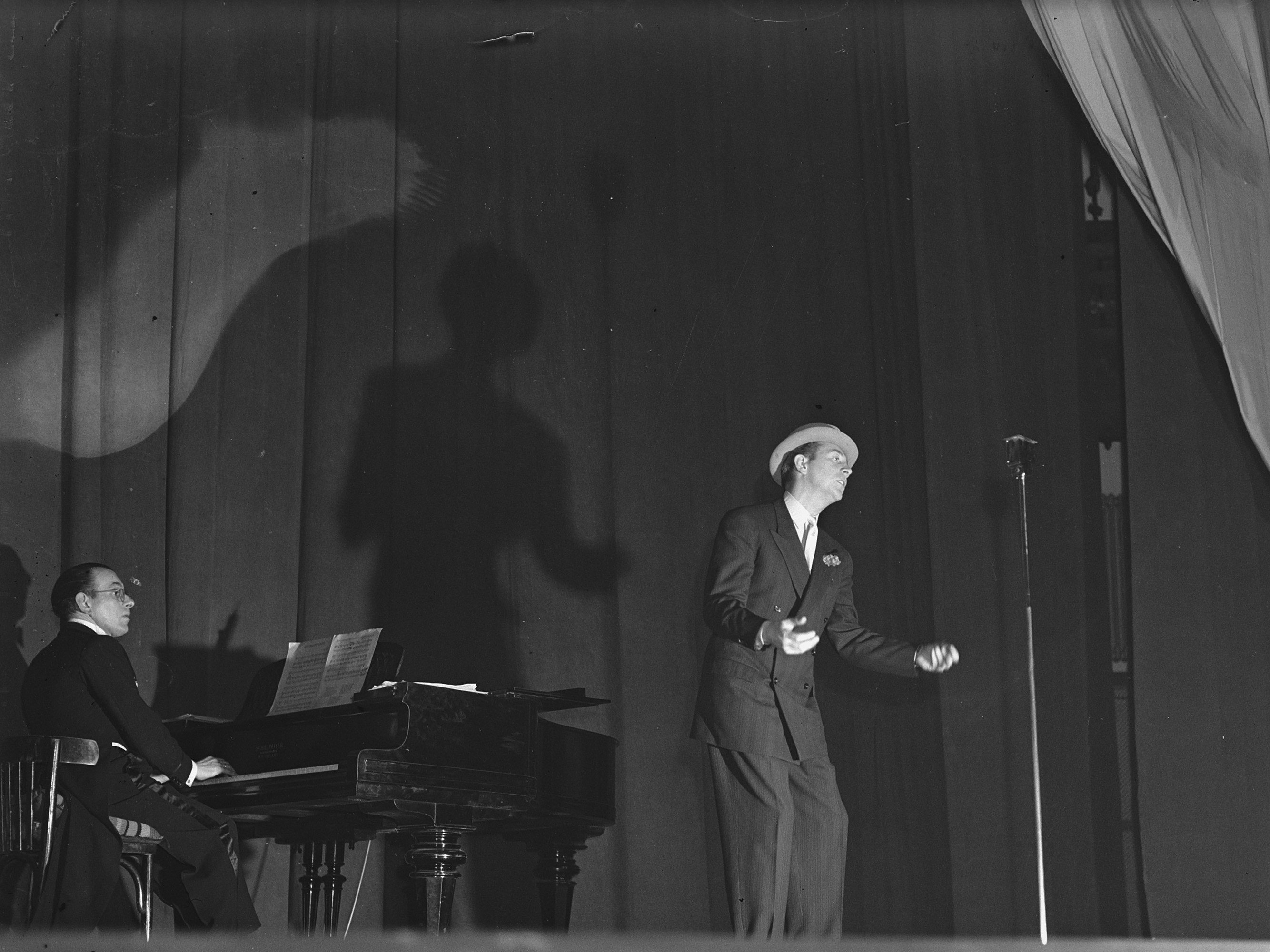
- Jan Broekhuis at the piano, accompanying Charles Trenet (Amsterdam, Dec. 1945)

Background information
- Also known as: John Brookhouse McCarthy
- Born: Johannes Franciscus Broekhuis; 25 February 1901; Amsterdam
- Died: 18 March 1974 (aged 73) Lucerne
- Genres: Popular music
- Occupation: Composer

Johannes Franciscus (Jan) Broekhuis (Amsterdam, 25 February 1901 – Lucerne, 18 March 1974) was a Dutch composer, better known by his artistic name John Brookhouse McCarthy.

== Biography ==
He studied at the Amsterdam Conservatory. His teachers included Julius Röntgen and Bernard Zweers. He previously had lessons from Evert Cornelis and Egbert Veen. In three years he obtained all diplomas and for piano the prize of excellence. After his studies he became a teacher at the conservatory in Limoges in France, also gave concerts there and then became conductor at the Théatre Français in Bordeaux. From 1931 he was an operetta conductor in Paris, Lyon and Amsterdam, among other places.

This was followed by his time for the Dutch broadcasting service, where he was employed as a conductor, composer and arranger and was very successful. Around that time (1933-'34) he wrote three compositions for the first Dutch show film De Jantjes, from which Omdat ik zoveel van je hou and Draaien are still played today. He was also the musical director and arranger for this film, the second Dutch sound film at all.

He also wrote countless songs for revue and cabaret, including all hits for the well-known Peter Pech revues, a creation by Jan Hahn and many for Heintje Davids, as well as for Willy Walden and Piet Muijselaar of the duo Snip and Snap, including the well-known song Snip snapt niet wat Snap snapt.

He also composed serious music, including a violin sonata dedicated to Jacques Thibaud and played by him, three nocturnes and a burlesque for cello and piano. Some of these works were performed for radio in the 1960s, including by his own trio with Willy and Jean Busch. At the time, the Promenade Orchestra, conducted by Benedict Silberman, performed the Ballade composed by him for piano and orchestra.

Broekhuis continued to work in England and America (in New York, Los Angeles and Hollywood) and stayed in Paris until 1931, where he accompanied the famous Mistinguett in the Folies Bergère. After that, many operettas were performed in Theater Carré under his direction. Both during Charles Trenet's tour in 1945 and Josephine Baker's final world tour in 1956, the orchestra in the Netherlands was under his direction.

Broekhuis had many orchestra formations under his own name at home and abroad. In addition, many operettas were performed in theater Carré under his musical direction and he was the conductor of various revues, including Heintje Davids and Rene Sleeswijk's Dutch revue (the Snip and Snap Revue). In the sixties he was also conductor of the Hoofdstad Operette for several seasons.

During this time he settled in Switzerland, where he enjoyed much success as a concert pianist for many years. He died on March 18, 1974, in Lucerne, where he is also buried. His music appears to have become timeless and now belongs to the Dutch national heritage.

== Compositions (selection) ==
- Une Valse a la Chopin, for piano (1923)
- Waltz in a flat, for piano (1923)
- Waltz in b flat, for piano (1927)
- Jokes, for piano (1927)
- Waltz in A minor, for piano (1928)
- Serenade en forme de Polonaise, for violin and piano (1928)
- Saxovaria, for saxophone and piano (1929)
- Pour qui gardes tu ton coeur?, for voice and piano (1930)
- Frivolite, for saxophone (or violin) and piano (1931)
- Irene, for voice and piano (1931)
- Just a little paradise, for voice and piano (1931)
- Reflection, for violin and orchestra (1932)
- En murmurant, for violin, cello, clarinet, piano and contrabass (1932)
- Draaien, for voice and piano (1933)
- Omdat ik zoveel van je hou…!, for voice and piano (1934)
- Mijn volkstuinkoningin, for voice and piano (1934)

Compositions by Broekhuis are archived both in the Netherlands and in Germany.
