= A Kingdom for a House =

1949 film

Een Koninkrijk voor een huis
- Film poster
- Directed by: Jaap Speyer
- Written by: Rido and Piet Bakker
- Cinematography: Richard Angst
- Release date: 11 March 1949
- Running time: 96 minutes
- Country: Netherlands
- Language: Dutch
- Box office: 1.3 million admissions (Netherlands)

A Kingdom for a House or (Dutch: Een Koninkrijk voor een huis) is a 1949 Dutch comedy film directed by Jaap Speyer. With almost 1.3 million admissions it is one of the most successful Dutch films of all time.

== Plot ==
After the end of World War II, the Netherlands is plagued by a severe housing shortage. The wealthy and well-to-do Van Laar family is forced to take in a homeless family. The lady of the house, Antoinette, tries in vain to get out of this and has to rent out two rooms. Her maid, Bertha, invites her sister Heintje to move in with her employer. Heintje is a boisterous market vendor of humble origins who lives with her daughter Daisy at her brother Kobus’s place in the Jordaan neighborhood. She is advised against moving to the Apollolaan, as only people of a higher social standing live there. However, she is determined to move in with Daisy.

Heintje receives anything but a warm welcome from Antoinette. When Antoinette, who is doing everything she can to get her out of the house as quickly as possible, learns that Bertha has invited Heintje to live there, she fires Bertha immediately. Her husband, Johan, however, welcomes Heintje, Kobus, and Daisy, who quickly catches his eye, with open arms. She works as a secretary for his biggest competitor. His son Rob is also very impressed by the young lady. Both Antoinette and Heintje try to keep the chemistry between Daisy and Rob in check.

Rob and Daisy meet up in secret. On a boat trip, he declares his love for her and they kiss. Daisy is afraid their parents will find out the truth about their relationship, but he tells her not to worry. When they are caught by Antoinette, she is furious. Rob quickly runs away, leaving Daisy behind. She feels abandoned and leaves the Van Laar household to move back in with Kobus. Meanwhile, Heintje and Antoinette make one attempt after another to thwart each other’s peace and happiness. Heintje finds it incomprehensible that Antoinette looks down on Daisy and considers leaving home as well.

Meanwhile, counterfeit textile stamps are found on the Apollolaan, and Johan is in danger of being arrested. Heintje tries in vain to prevent this. When Daisy hears about this, she realizes it’s a ruse. She contacts Rob and they try to prove Johan’s innocence together. They catch Johan’s competitors breaking into the safe and have them arrested. Daisy is reunited with Rob, and Heintje and Antoinette also settle their dispute. Rob and Daisy announce that they will get married and then move in with Heintje.

== Cast ==
- Heintje Davids as Heintje Blom (as Henriette Davids)
- Johan Kaart as Kobus Blom
- Annie Van Duyn as Daisy Blom (as Annetje van Duyn)
- Rob de Vries as Rob van Laar (as Robert de Vries)
- Tilly Perin-Bouwmeester as Antoinette van Laar
- Clara Vischer-Blaaser (as Clara Vischer)
