= Greta Meyer =

German actress (1883–1965)

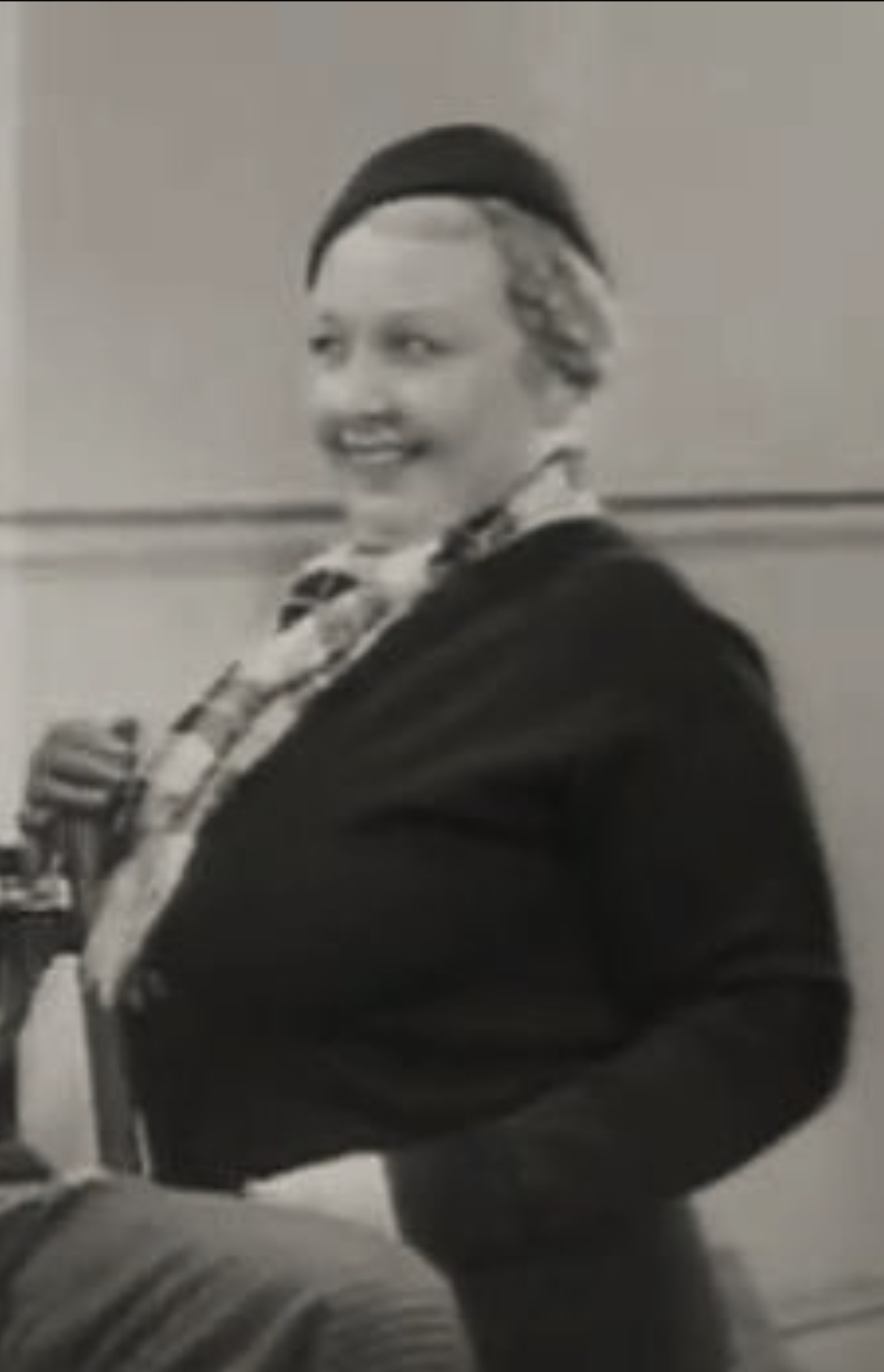
- Meyer in Bill Cracks Down (1937)
- Born: 7 August 1883; Dessau, Germany
- Died: 8 October 1965 (aged 82); Gardena, California, U.S.
- Occupation: Actress
- Years active: 1917–1942

Greta Meyer (7 August 1883 – 8 October 1965) was a German actress in motion pictures beginning in the silent film era.

== Biography ==
Meyer belonged to a German family that was comparable to the Barrymore family in America. At age 3 she debuted on stage with her father's stock company. She went on to perform in operettas and plays in Amsterdam, Berlin, Dresden, Vienna, and other cities in Europe. She sang for Austria's emperor and Kaiser Wilhelm, and she starred in The Merry Widow for the Count of Luxembourg.

Her early film efforts came in films like De jantjes (1922) and Die Königsloge (1929).

Meyer came to the United States as the star of an operetta company. When the operetta's run was completed, she stayed in New York, starring in The Bat and other plays. She began a German theater in New York, but anti-German feelings following World War I diminished attendance and caused protests, leading to the theater's closing. She went on to study Yiddish and to perform across the United States with a Yiddish Arts Theater stock company.

At one point, without a job and short of funds, Meyer decided to return to Germany. She staged a farewell performance in New York City with little hope of a large audience. The performance sold out, and standing room was filled, enabling Meyer to pay all of her debts and retain $480. She went to Germany as planned but returned to America.

In 1923, Meyer became a U.S. citizen. Broadway plays in which she appeared included Auction Pinochle (1912) and Tonight or Never (1930). Meyer appeared in many Hollywood movies between 1933 and 1942, including The Great Waltz (1938) and Bitter Sweet (1940).

In 1963, Meyer was evicted from her home at 505 North Westmount Drive, West Hollywood, California, when property owners decided to replace her old home with a new structure. She moved in with a friend but had little place to store her acting memorabilia. Meyer contemplated a return to Germany.

She acted on the stage and in films for almost seventy years. Greta Meyer died in Gardena, California in 1965.

== Partial filmography ==
- The Balance (Das Gleichgewicht) (1917) Short (as Grete Meier)
- The Bluejackets (De jantjes) (1922)
- The Royal Box (Die Königsloge) (1929)
- Tonight or Never (1931)
- The Man from Yesterday (1932)
- Flesh (1932)
- The Nuisance (1933)
- The Most Precious Thing in Life (1934)
- Young and Beautiful (1934)
- Strange Wives (1934)
- The Line-Up (1934)
- Biography of a Bachelor Girl (1935)
- Naughty Marietta (1935)
- Mister Dynamite (1935)
- The Return of Peter Grimm (1935)
- Spendthrift (1936)
- Bill Cracks Down (1937)
- When Love Is Young (1937)
- Damaged Goods (1937)
- Night of Mystery (1937)
- The Road Back (1937)
- Prescription for Romance (1937)
- The Great Waltz (1938)
- No Place to Go (1939)
- Bitter Sweet (1940)
- Come Live with Me (1941)
- Friendly Enemies (1942)
