= Cissy van Bennekom =

Dutch actress (1911–2005)

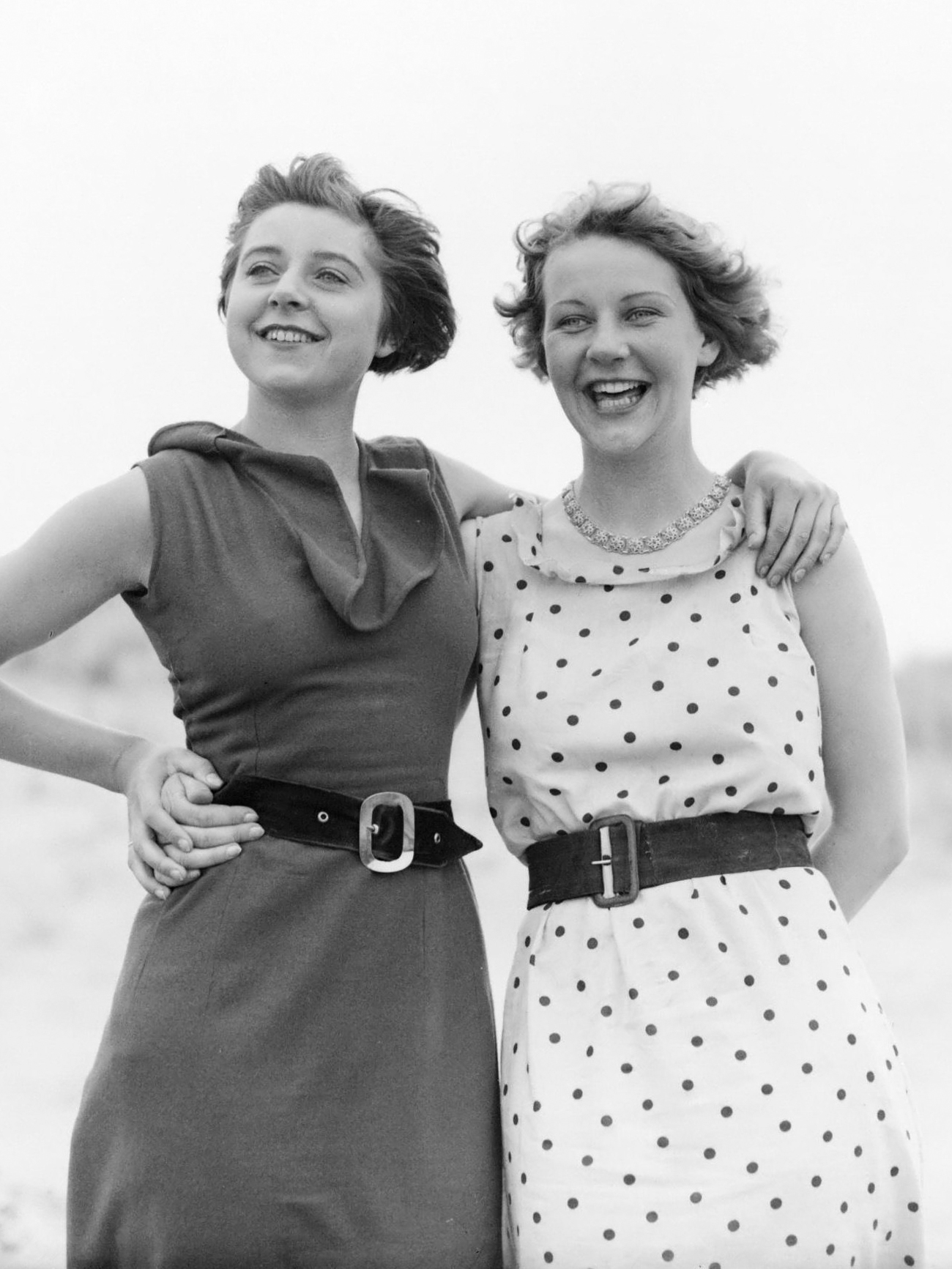
- Cissy van Bennekom and Eva Waldschmidt (1932)
- Born: Ciccy van Bennekom; 11 July 1911; Haarlem, Netherlands
- Died: 1 March 2005 (aged 93); Amsterdam, Netherlands
- Occupations: Comedy, Actress

Cissy van Bennekom (alternate spellings: Ciccy v. Bennekom and Cissij van Bennekom; 11 July 1911 – 1 March 2005) was a Dutch comedy actress.

== Filmography ==
- The Tars (1934)
- De Jantjes (1934)
- Op hoop van zegen (1934)
- De Familie van mijn Vrouw (1935)
- De Vier Mullers (1935)
- 't Was één April (1935)
- Op een Avond in Mei (1936)
- Amsterdam bij nacht (1937)
- De Spooktrein (1939)
