= When Love Is Young =

1937 film by Hal Mohr

- Theatrical release poster
- Directed by: Hal Mohr
- Screenplay by: Joseph Fields; Eve Greene
- Based on: Class Prophecy by Eleanore Griffin
- Produced by: Charles R. Rogers
- Starring: Virginia Bruce; Kent Taylor; Walter Brennan; Greta Meyer; Christian Rub; William Tannen
- Cinematography: Jerome Ash
- Edited by: Bernard W. Burton
- Music by: Score: Frank Skinner; Songs: Jimmy McHugh (music); Harold Adamson (lyrics)
- Production company: Universal Pictures
- Distributed by: Universal Pictures
- Release date: March 28, 1937
- Running time: 76 minutes
- Country: United States
- Language: English

When Love Is Young is a 1937 American comedy film directed by Hal Mohr and starring Virginia Bruce, Kent Taylor, Walter Brennan, Greta Meyer, Christian Rub and William Tannen. Written by Joseph Fields and Eve Greene, it is based on the 1935 short story Class Prophecy by Eleanore Griffin that was originally serialized in McCall's Magazine. The film was released on March 28, 1937, by Universal Pictures.

== Plot ==
Wanda Werner is an aspiring opera singer from rural America and tries to make it big by singing popular hits from Broadway.

== Cast ==
- Virginia Bruce as Wanda Werner
- Kent Taylor as Andy Russell
- Walter Brennan as Uncle Hugo
- Greta Meyer as Hannah Werner
- Christian Rub as Anton Werner
- William Tannen as Norman Crocker
- Jean Rogers as Irene Henry
- Sterling Holloway as Orville Kane
- Nydia Westman as 'Dotty' Leonard
- David Oliver as Cudgy Wallace
- Laurie Douglas as Laurie Sykes
- J. Scott Smart as Winthrop Grove
- Franklin Pangborn as John Dorman
