= Terra Nova (1932 film) =

1932 film

Nova Terra
- Directed by: Gerard Rutten
- Written by: Adolphe Engers; Ben van Eysselsteijn
- Music by: Hans Brandts Buys
- Release date: 1932
- Running time: 67 minutes
- Country: Netherlands
- Language: Dutch

Nova Terra is a 1932 Dutch documentary film directed by Gerard Rutten.

== Cast ==
- Janne Donk ... Old boatsman's wife
- Adolphe Engers ... Old boatsman
- Piet Rienks ... Servant

== See also ==
- Dutch films of the 1930s
