= DeLaMar =

Theatre in Amsterdam, Netherlands

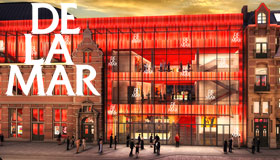
- Interactive map of DeLaMar
- Address: Marnixstraat 404; Amsterdam; Netherlands
- Coordinates: 52.3643°N 4.8809°E
- Owner: VandenEnde Foundation
- Capacity: 1,540
- Current use: musicals, cabaret, drama

Construction
- Opened: 1947
- Reopened: 2010
- Architect: Arno Meijs

Website
- www.delamar.nl

DeLaMar is a theatre near Leidseplein in Amsterdam, Netherlands, with two auditoriums containing 601 and 939 seats. It is currently in use for musicals, plays and cabaret.

== History ==
The building which now houses DeLaMar was built in 1887 and was once used as a school and a warehouse. During the German occupation of the Netherlands in World War II, the Germans stored data relating to forced labour in the building. The Dutch resistance bombed the building on 7 January 1944, causing part of the building to burn down.

In 1947, architect Piet Grossouw bought the building and opened the De la Mar Theater, which he named after actor Nap de la Mar, his wife Fien de la Mar's father. Wim Sonneveld bought the theatre in 1952 and reopened it as the Nieuwe de la Mar Theater (English: New de la Mar Theatre). In 2010, shortly before the theatre reopened with its current name, the largest auditorium was named after Sonneveld. When Wim Kan started performing at the theatre, it became a national success.

The theatre was closed for renovation in 2005 by the VandenEnde Foundation, which was established by Joop and Janine van den Ende. After finishing the renovations in 2010, the theater was renamed DeLaMar and officially opened by Queen Beatrix.
