= Fien de la Mar =

Dutch stage and film actress and cabaret performer

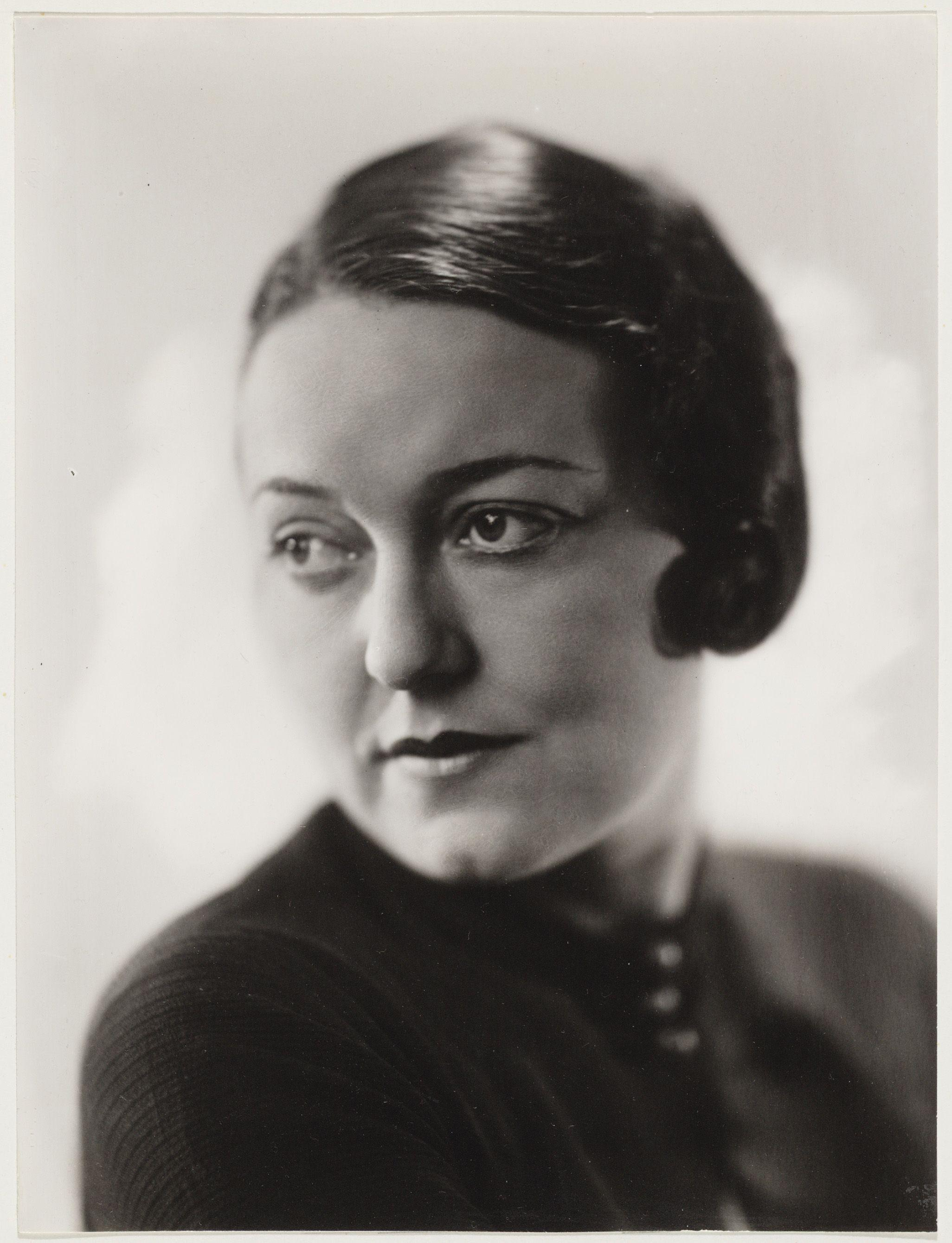
- Fien de la Mar in 1933
- Born: Josephina Johanna de la Mar; 2 February 1898; Amsterdam, Netherlands
- Died: 23 April 1965 (aged 67); Amsterdam, Netherlands
- Occupations: Stage actress, film actress, cabaret performer
- Years active: 1916–1960s
- Spouse: Pieter Grossouw (m. 1941–1957)

Josephina Johanna "Fien" de la Mar (2 February 1898 – 23 April 1965) was a Dutch stage actress, film actress and cabaret performer. She was one of the most celebrated theatrical personalities in the Netherlands during the interwar years and was known for her versatility, strong stage presence and distinctive personality.

== Early life ==
De la Mar was born in Amsterdam into a prominent theatrical family. She was the daughter of actor and director Napoleon Christiaan ("Nap") de la Mar and actress Clasina Margaretha Klopper. Her grandfather, Charles de la Mar (born 1848), was a Portuguese Jewish theatre actor and director.

She grew up partly with her maternal grandparents in the rural village of Sloten, near Amsterdam. De la Mar attended a girls HBS (secondary school) in Rotterdam. Three months before her final examinations, she left school to pursue a career in the theatre, a decision encouraged and guided by her father, who became her first mentor.

== Stage and cabaret career ==
De la Mar made her professional debut in 1916 in the revue Had je me maar alongside Louis Davids. She quickly established herself as a promising young performer, appearing with her parents in the operetta Madorah (1917) written especially for her. Her breakthrough as a dramatic actress came in the late 1920s with the Rotterdamsch-Hofstad-Tooneel. Among her most notable roles were Pygmalion by George Bernard Shaw (1928), Het graf van de onbekende soldaat (1928), Het proces van Mary Dugan (1928), Minna von Barnhelm by Lessing (1929) and Moortje by Bredero (1932). Later in her career she worked with directors such as Cees Laseur, Albert van Dalsum, Ko van Dijk jr. and Cruys Voorbergh.

Alongside her dramatic work, de la Mar was highly regarded as a cabaret performer. She was noted for her acting skills in sketches and as a chanteuse. She performed comic and tragic material in a highly personal and intense style. Although cabaret was not her sole focus, she worked with figures such as Rudolf Nelson, Willy van Hemert and Cor Ruys, as well as in ensembles she assembled herself.

== Film work ==
With the rise of Dutch sound film in the early 1930s, de la Mar reached a wider audience. She appeared in several early feature films, including De Jantjes (1934), Bleeke Bet (1934) and Op Stap (1935). Her performances, marked for their expressiveness and double entendre, contributed significantly to her popularity. She became closely associated with the song "Ik wil gelukkig zijn" ("I want to be happy"), which she performed on screen and which remained linked to her public image.

== War years and own theatre ==
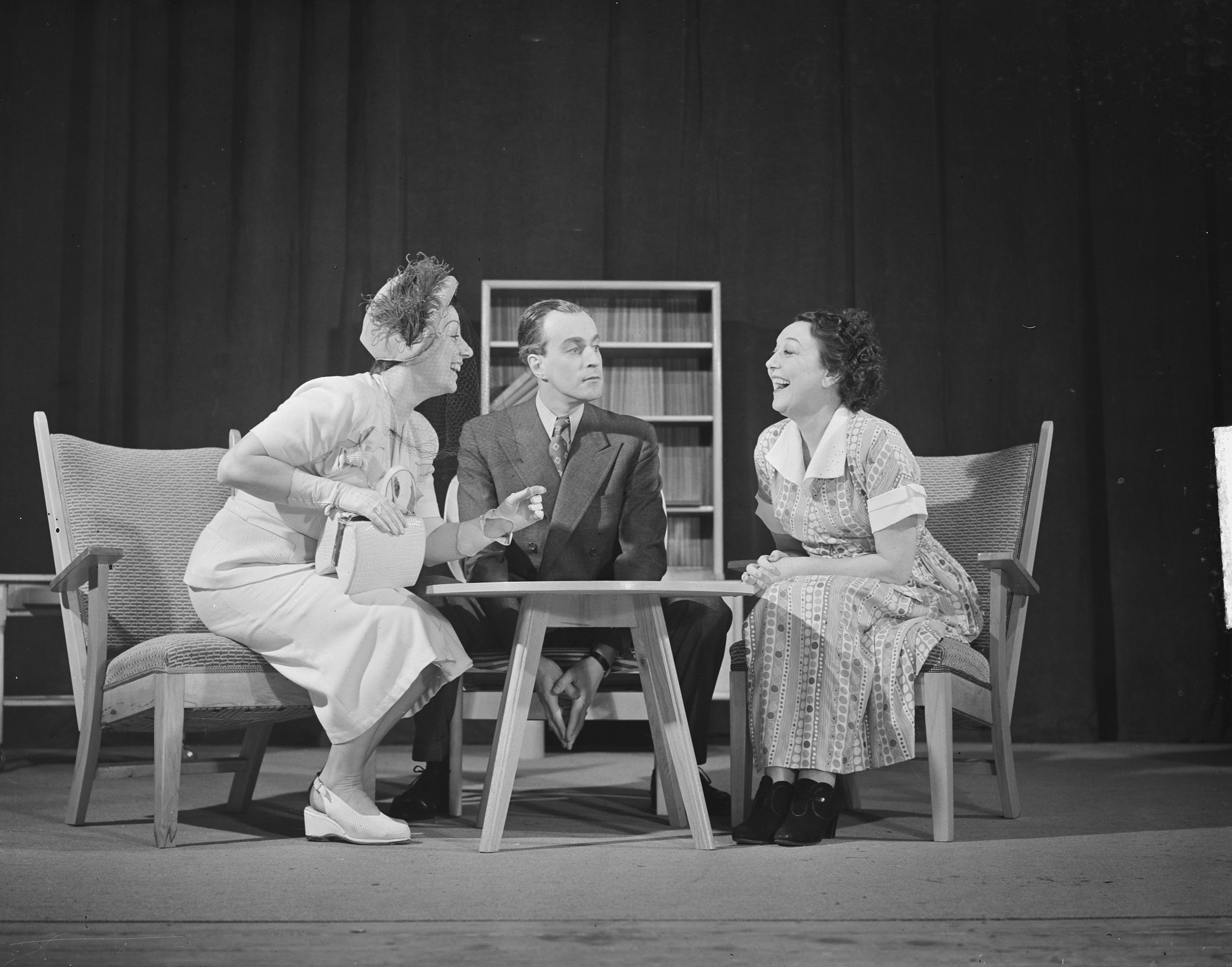
Fien de la Mar with Tini Visser and Gerard Reben in Veel te veel vrouwen (1949)

During the German occupation of the Netherlands, de la Mar continued performing until 1943, when she refused to register with the Nazi-controlled Nederlandsche Kultuurkamer. After the liberation, she returned to the stage in the anti-war play Vrij volk. Together with her husband, architect Pieter Grossouw, she opened her own theatre in the Marnixstraat in Amsterdam, named the De la Mar Theater after her father. Despite artistic success, the theatre struggled financially, and in 1952 it was taken over by Wim Sonneveld and renamed the Nieuwe De la Mar Theater.

== Later life and death ==
Following the death of her husband in 1957, de la Mar's life and career entered a period of decline. She made a suicide attempt that left her left arm paralysed and spent time in psychiatric care. Although she returned briefly to work with theatre ensembles and on television, her mental health deteriorated further, marked by paranoia and emotional instability, which increasingly isolated her from colleagues and friends.

On 18 April 1965 de la Mar jumped from the window of her apartment in Amsterdam. She died five days later, on 23 April 1965, at the age of 67. She was buried at Zorgvlied cemetery, attended by hundreds of mourners.

== Filmography ==
Year	Title	Role
1934	De Jantjes	Toffe Jans
1934	Bleeke Bet	Ka
1935	Op Stap	Bella Ramona
1935	De Big van het Regiment	Fietje
1935	Het leven is niet zo kwaad	Anita Mara
1936	Klokslag Twaalf	Matia
1939	De Spooktrein	Julia van Dongen
1940	Ergens in Nederland	Society lady

== Theatre (selection) ==
Year	Play / Production	Role	Notes
1916	Had je me maar	-	Revue, early breakthrough with Louis Davids
1917	Madorah	-	Operetta
1921	Cabaret productions (with Louis Davids)	Herself	
1924	Cabaret Rudolf Nelson	Herself	International cabaret repertoire
1928	Pygmalion	Eliza Doolittle	First major dramatic success
1928	Het proces van Mary Dugan	Mary Dugan	Leading role in courtroom drama
1929	Minna von Barnhelm	Minna	Comedy
1932	Moortje	Moortje	Comedy
1941	The Taming of the Shrew	Katharina	First Shakespeare role; opposite Albert van Dalsum
1945	Vrij volk	-	Anti-war play; post-liberation return
1946	Lysistrata	Lysistrata	Play
1946	Cabaret Cor Ruys	Herself	Successful post-war cabaret comeback
1947	Cabaret Willy van Hemert	Herself	
1947	Maya	Maya	Play
