= Rudolf Meinert =

Austrian filmmaker (1882–1943)

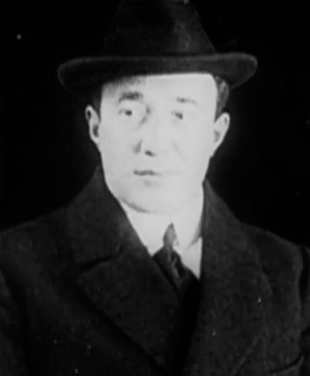
Meinert in 1914

Rudolf Meinert (1882 – 6 March 1943) was an Austrian screenwriter, film producer and director.

Meinert was born Rudolf Bürstein in Vienna, but worked for most of his career in the German film industry. He became well-established as the producer/director of silent crime films. In the immediate post-First World War period, Meinert was head of production at the German studio Decla after his own production unit Meinert-Film was taken over by the larger outfit. Meinert, rather than Erich Pommer, is sometimes credited as the producer behind Decla's revolutionary The Cabinet of Dr. Caligari (1920). Following the Nazi takeover of power in Germany, Meinert, who was Jewish, went into exile in the Netherlands, however he returned to Austria. He moved to France in 1937 and lived there until he was caught, sent to Drancy internment camp and transported to Majdanek concentration camp on 6 March 1943, where he was murdered.

== Selected filmography ==
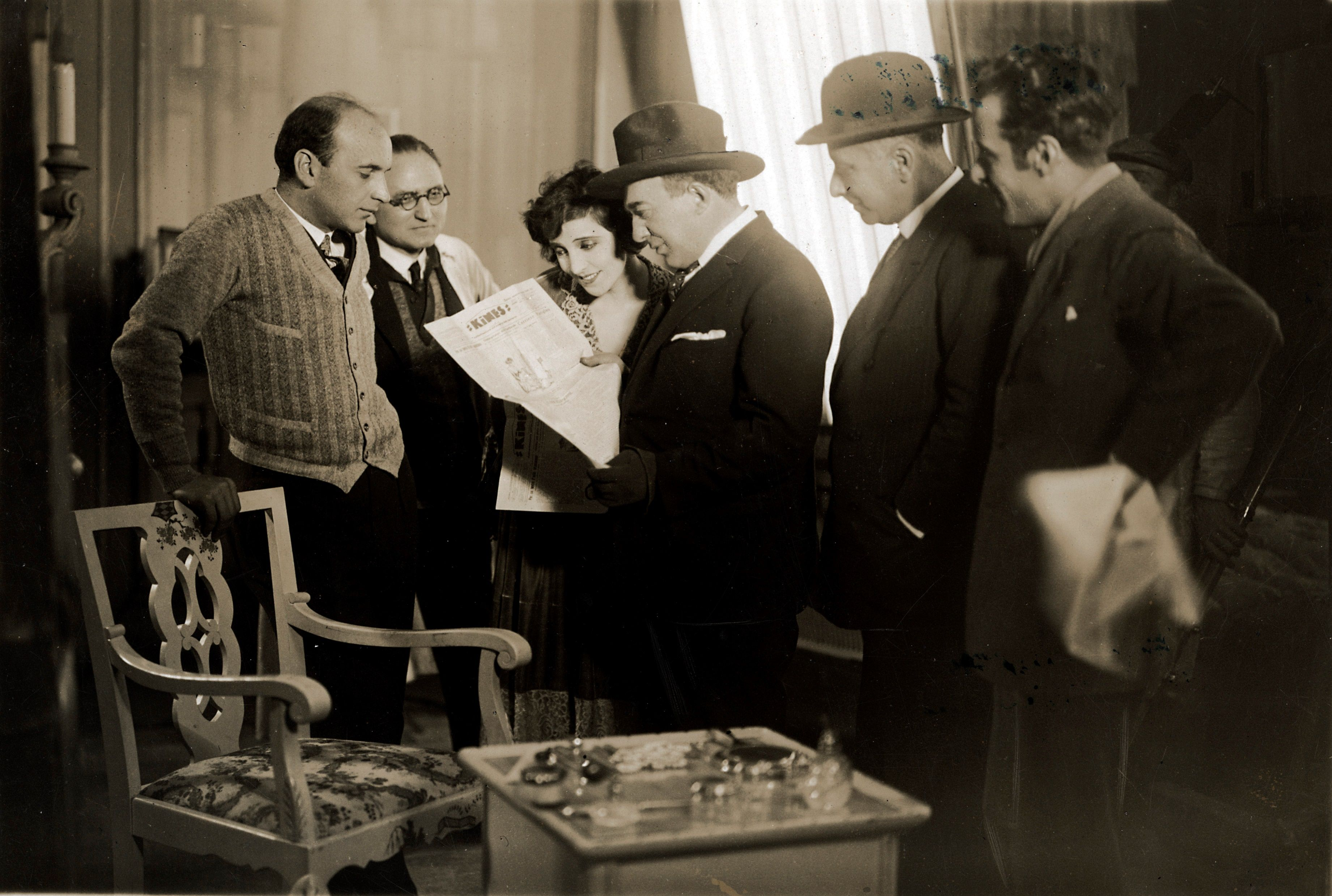
Meinert (center) in 1926

=== Director ===
- Der Hund von Baskerville (1914)
- Vengeance Is Mine (1916)
- Ferdinand Lassalle (1918)
- The Monastery of Sendomir (1919)
- Marie Antoinette, the Love of a King (1922)
- The Red Mouse (1926)
- The Eleven Schill Officers (1926)
- The Vice of Humanity (1927)
- The Convicted (1927)
- The Case of Prosecutor M (1928)
- The White Roses of Ravensberg (1929)
- The Green Monocle (1929)
- Masks (1929)
- The Song of the Nations (1931)
- The Eleven Schill Officers (1932)
- Het Meisje met den Blauwen Hoed (1934)
- De Vier Mullers (1934)
- Everything for the Company (1935)

=== Producer ===
- Vengeance Is Mine (1916)
- Genuine (1920)
- The Cabinet of Dr. Caligari (1920)
- Father Voss (1925)
- Escape from Hell (1928)
- The Song of the Nations (1931)

=== Actor ===
- The Eleven Schill Officers (1926)
- The Song of the Nations (1931)

== Bibliography ==
- Eisner, Lotte H. The Haunted Screen: Expressionism in the German Cinema and the Influence of Max Reinhardt. University of California Press, 2008.
- Hardt, Usula. From Caligari to California: Erich Pommer's Life in the International Film Wars. Berghahn Books, 1996.
- Kreimeier, Klaus. The Ufa story: a history of Germany's greatest film company, 1918-1945. University of California Press, 1999.
- St. Pierre, Paul Matthew. E.A. Dupont and his Contribution to British Film: Varieté, Moulin Rouge, Piccadilly, Atlantic, Two Worlds, Cape Forlorn. Fairleigh Dickinson University Press, 2010.
- Prawer, S.S. Between Two Worlds: The Jewish Presence in German and Austrian Film, 1910-1933. Berghahn Books, 2007.
