= Everything for the Company (1935 film) =

1935 film directed by Rudolf Meinert

- Directed by: Rudolf Meinert
- Written by: Paul Frank; Peter Herz; Rudolf Meinert
- Starring: Oskar Karlweis; Felix Bressart; Otto Wallburg
- Cinematography: Willy Goldberger
- Edited by: Putty Krafft
- Music by: Artur Guttmann; Hans J. Salter
- Production company: BMS-Film
- Distributed by: Huschak & Company
- Release date: 5 April 1935
- Running time: 88 minutes
- Country: Austria
- Language: German

Everything for the Company (German: Alles für die Firma) is a 1935 Austrian comedy film directed by Rudolf Meinert and starring Oskar Karlweis, Felix Bressart and Otto Wallburg. Many of those involved in the film's production had recently fled from Nazi Germany. It was shot at the Schönbrunn Studios in Vienna. The film's sets were designed by the art director Artur Berger. A separate Dutch version De Vier Mullers was also produced, directed by Meinert and starring Johannes Heesters.

== Cast ==
- Oskar Karlweis as Otto Sonndorfer
- Felix Bressart as Philipp Sonndorfer
- Otto Wallburg as Emmerich Liebling
- Alfred Neugebauer as Max Sonndorfer
- Friedl Czepa as Dr. Hertha Becker
- Gretel Berndt as Daisy Rix
- Hermine Sterler as Ella Sonndorfer
- Fritz Imhoff as Hoffmann
- Annie Rosar as Frau Lasch
- Viktor Staal

== Bibliography ==
- Dassanowsky, Robert. Screening Transcendence: Film Under Austrofascism and the Hollywood Hope, 1933–1938. Indiana University Press, 2018
