= De Voetbalmatch =

Single by Louis Davids
- B-side: "De Olieman Heeft Een Fordje Opgedaan"
- Released: 1929
- Genre: Cabaret
- Length: 2:51
- Label: His Master's Voice
- Songwriter: Louis Davids
- Producer: Jacques van Tol

"De Voetbalmatch" (Dutch pronunciation: [də ˈvudbɑlˌmɛtɕ]; "The Football Match") is a song by Louis Davids. It was released on 10" on His Master's Voice in 1929. The B-side to the single is "De Olieman Heeft Een Fordje Opgedaan".

In the song, Louis Davids recounts the experience of a girl visiting a football match in Amsterdam between the likes of AFC Ajax and Blauw-Wit Amsterdam with her boyfriend.

The song was later featured on Louis Davids Greatest Hits album which was released on EMI titled "12 Grote successen van de grote kleine man". It was the sixth track of the album, following "Een Hollands meisje" at number 5, with "De olieman heeft een Fordje opgedaan" following at track number 7.
