= Zeemansvrouwen =

1930 film

- Directed by: Henk Kleinmann
- Written by: Lodewijk de Boer; Herman Bouber (play)
- Release date: 16 May 1930
- Running time: 85 minutes
- Country: Netherlands
- Language: Dutch

Zeemansvrouwen (1930) is a Dutch film directed by Henk Kleinmann, and was intended to be the first ever sound film produced in the Netherlands. Instead, it became the last official Dutch silent film and the last film that would appear between 1930 and 1934. There would be semi-amateur films made in this interim.

== Plot ==
Willem is a well-meaning sailor, that visits the pub of Tante Saar when he returns home. He sees the beautiful Leen come there often as well, who he falls in love with. She is together with Lau until Lau is sent to prison. Willem and Leen then get to know each other better and he promises to marry her after his next return from sea. But upon his return Lau is back in her life and a cat and mouse game arises between the two men.

== Cast ==
- Harry Boda ... Willem Broerse
- Josephine Schetser ... Mooie Leen
- Raas Luijben ... Lau
- Jos Pasch ... Dronken Lodewijk, vader van Leen
- Clara Vischer-Blaaser ... Manke Mie
- Henkie Klein ... Nelis
- Daan Scheffer ... Kruidenier
- Henriette Verbeek ... Lucy
- Willem Heideman ... Daantje
- Mejuffrouw Cellarius ... Jaantje
- Reina Menjon ... Bertha
- Henk Kleinmann ... Dokter
- Kees Grutter ... Rooie Bart
- Dick Menten ... De luie

== Trivia ==
In 1930, the film Zeemansvrouwen would have been the first Dutch sound film but due to technical and financial difficulties became the last Dutch silent film.

In 2003, the images were studied by lip readers and the film's spoken material became a radio drama. It was screened during the Biennale on that year in the Film Museum in Amsterdam.

== See also ==
- Dutch films of the 1930s
