= The Three Wishes (1937 Dutch film) =

De Drie Wensen
- Directed by: Kurt Gerron
- Written by: Herman Bouber
- Release date: 1937
- Running time: 81 minutes
- Country: Netherlands
- Language: Dutch

The Three Wishes or De Drie Wensen is a 1937 Dutch film directed by Kurt Gerron. Simultaneously, an Italian language version, I tre desideri, was filmed with Italian actors at Cinecitta' studios in Rome. Both movies were shot during the summer of 1937. The Dutch version was badly received and attendance was poor. The production suffered from delays and setbacks, forcing Dutch star Lien Deyers to resign. Her part was given to Annie van Duyn.

== Cast ==
- Annie Van Duyn ... Maria Scudo, kinderjuffrouw (as Annie van Duyn)
- Jules Verstraete ... Oude miljonair
- Jan Teulings... Tino Murante, Maria's vriend
- Mimi Boesnach ... Cora Corelli, operaster
- Piet Bron ... Fortini
- Guus Oster ... Marco, Fortini's secretaris
- Aaf Bouber ... Juffrouw Talloni (as Aaf Bouber-ten Hoope)
- A.M. De Jong ... Rossi, impresario
- Herman Bouber ... Campagni, chef van de claque
- Kurt Gerron
- G.J. Teunissen ... Goedmoedige Lobbes
- Arie Croiset
