= Op Stap =

- Directed by: Ernst Winar
- Written by: Alexander Alexander, Jacques van Tol
- Release date: 1935
- Running time: 78 minutes
- Country: Netherlands
- Language: Dutch

Op Stap is a 1935 Dutch musical comedy film directed by Ernst Winar.

== Cast ==
- Jan Blok
- Frans Boogaers
- Heintje Davids ... Mrs. Fortuin
- Louis Davids... Piano Tuner
- Fien de la Mar ... Bella Ramona
- Alex De Meester
- Philip Dorn ... George van Reen
- Ber Engelen
- Adolphe Engers ... Uncle Barend
- Josephine van Gasteren
- Jan Hahn ... Man bij Operette
- Fientje Koehler
- Jopie Koopman ... Polly Fortuin
- Walter Smith
- Tini Visscher

== Gallery ==
Promotional photos of this film:

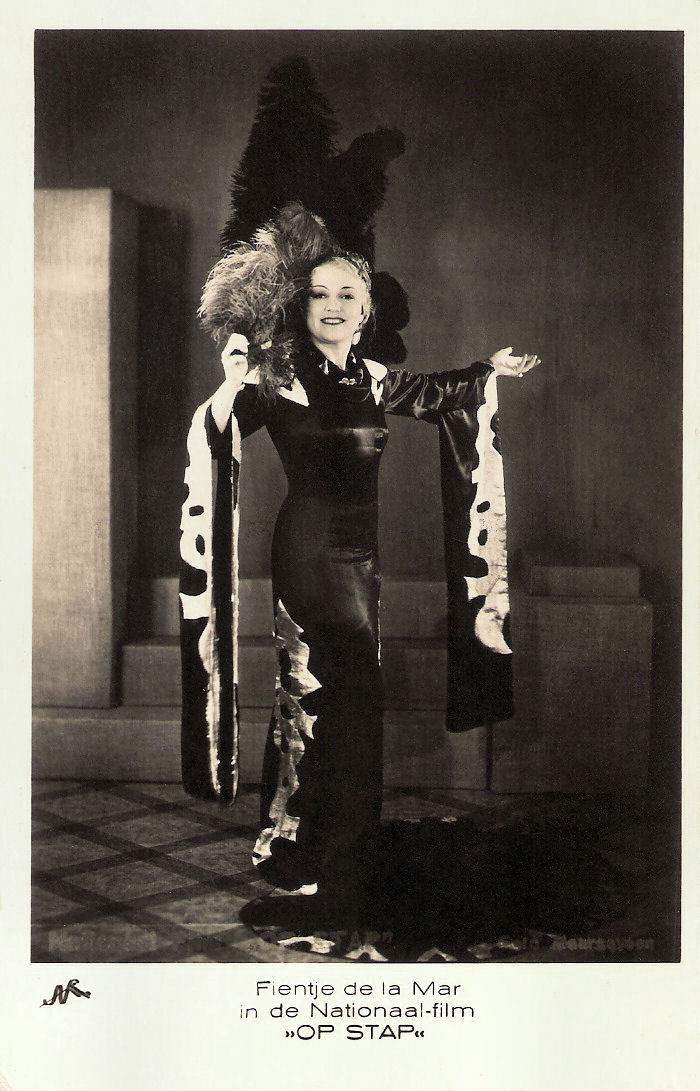

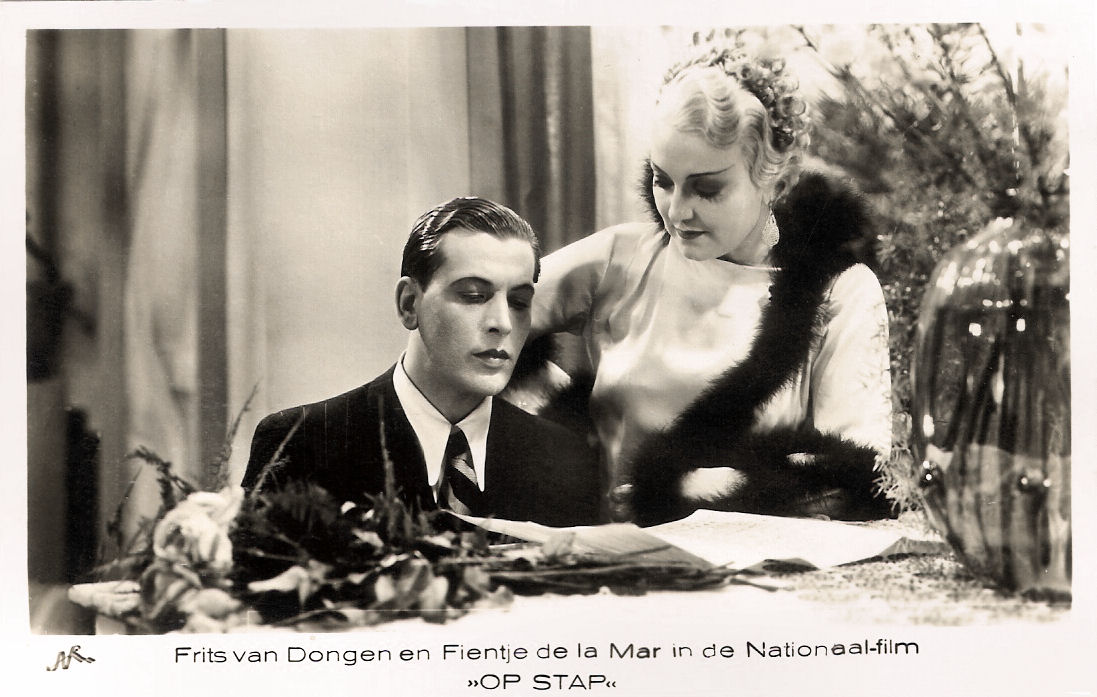

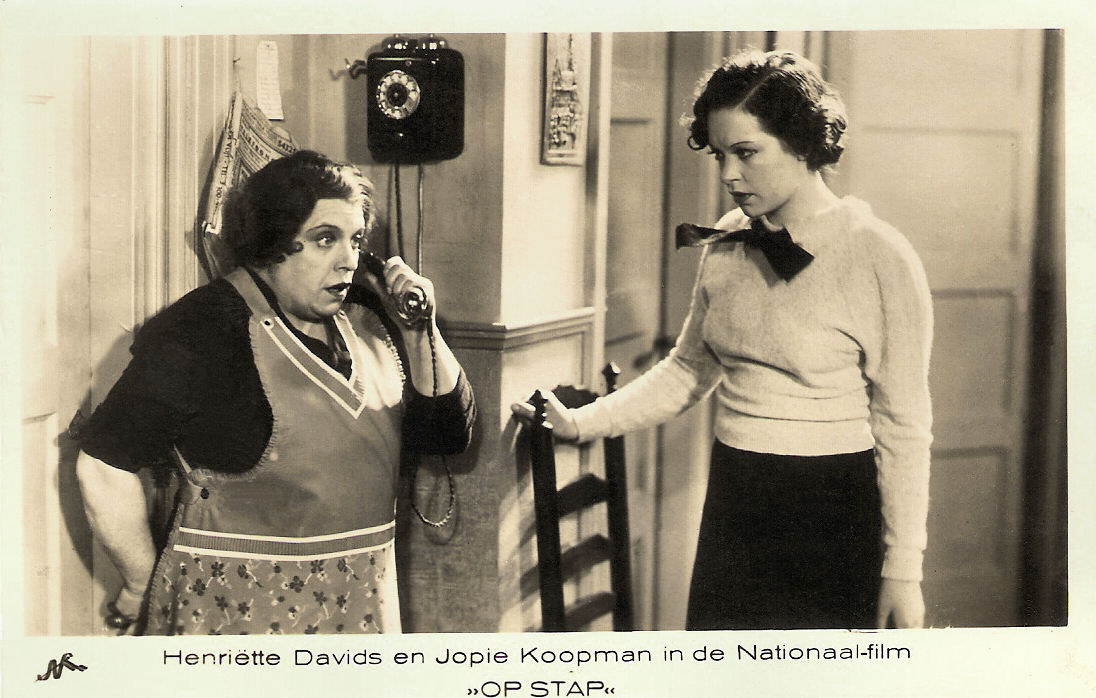

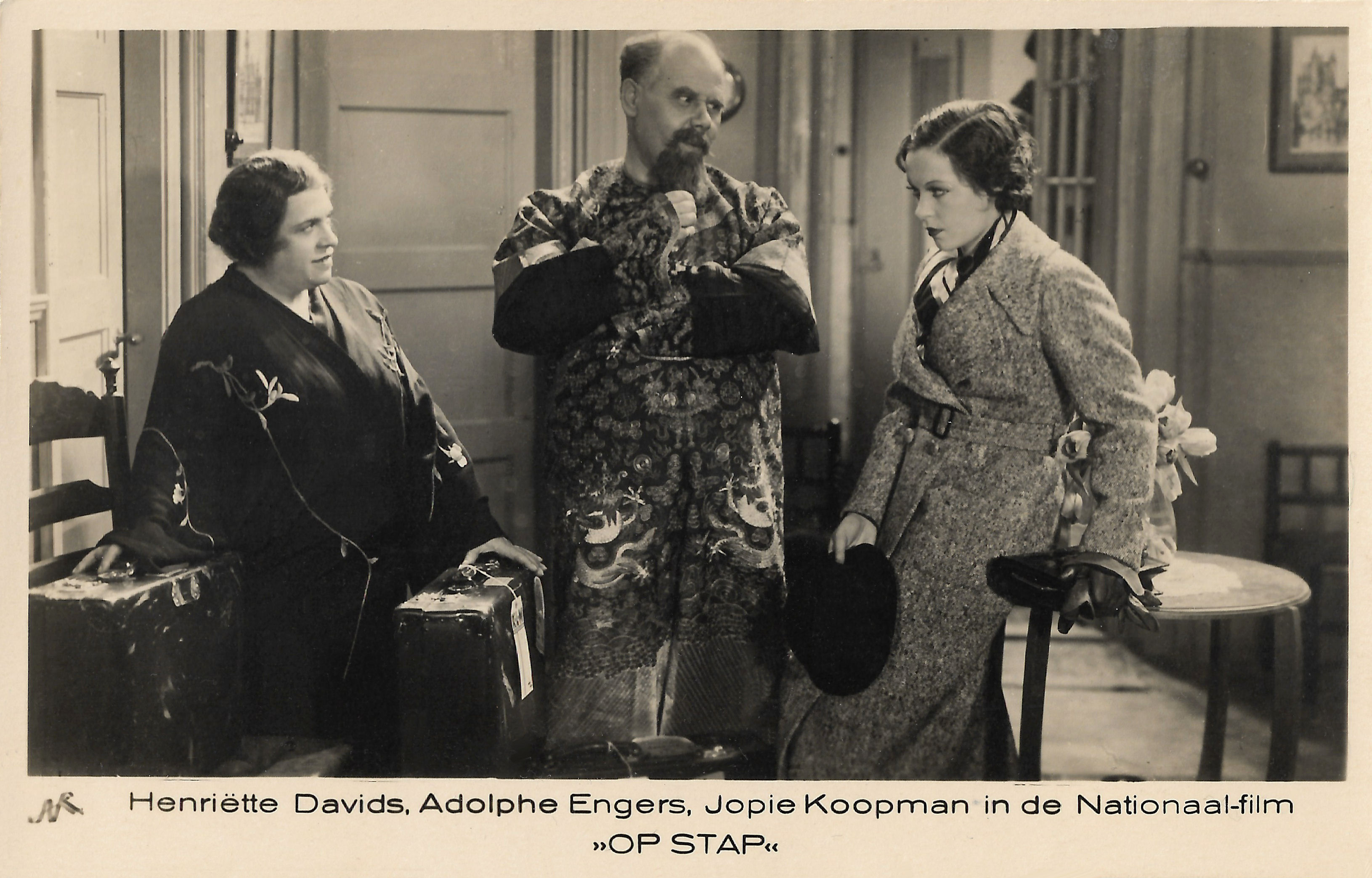

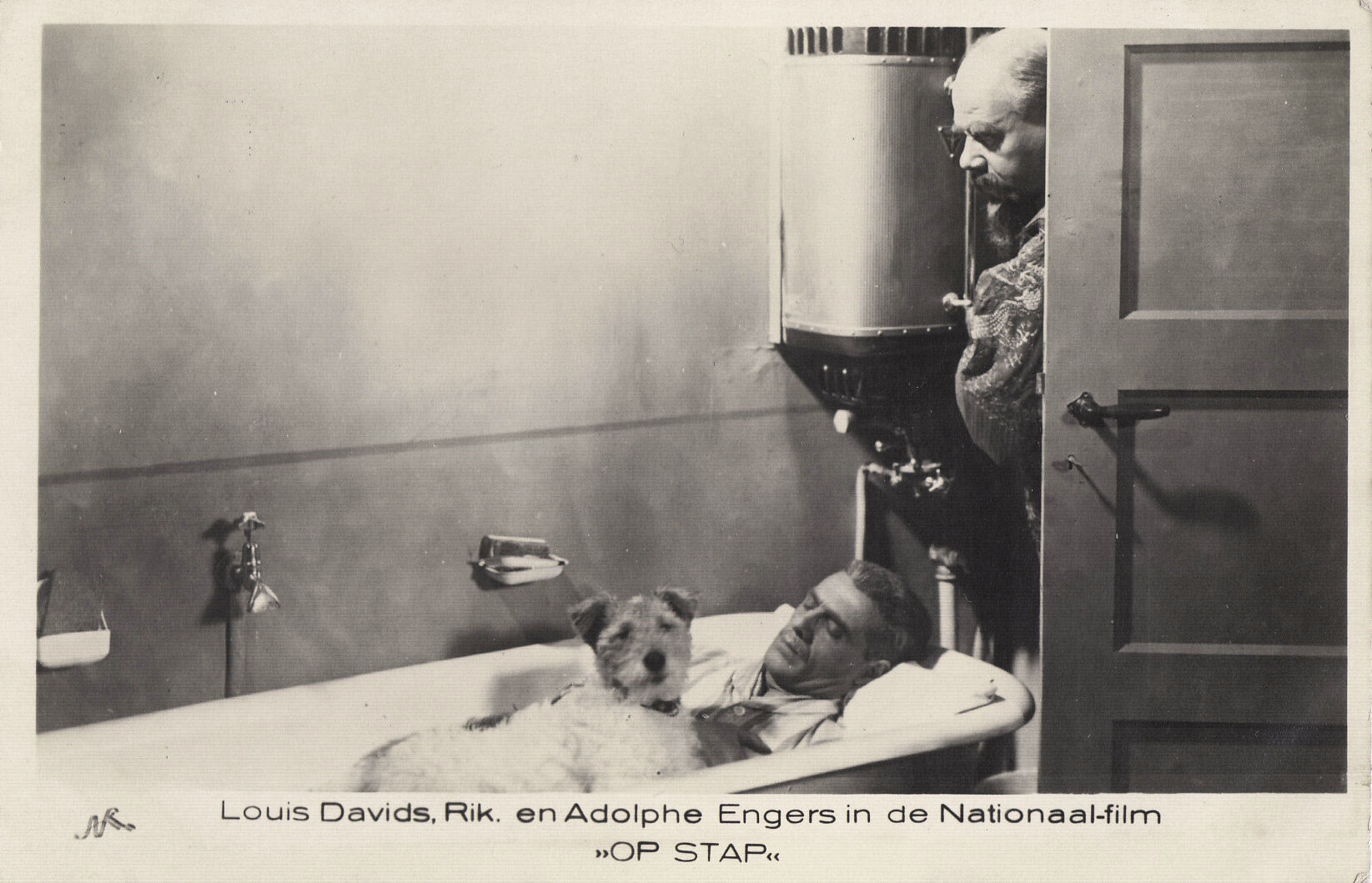
