= De Vier Mullers =

- Directed by: Rudolf Meinert
- Written by: Herman Bouber, Rudolf Meinert
- Release date: 1935
- Running time: 90 minutes
- Country: Netherlands
- Language: Dutch

De Vier Mullers is a 1935 Dutch film directed by Rudolf Meinert. A separate version Everything for the Company was produced, also directed by Meinert.

== Cast ==
- Adolf Bouwmeester
- Wiske Ghijs
- Johannes Heesters
- Johan Kaart
- Tilly Perin-Bouwmeester
- Jacques Van Bylevelt (as Jacques van Bijlevelt)
- Gusta Chrispijn-Mulder
- Minny Erfmann
- Cissy Van Bennekom
- Johan Schmitz
