= Op een Avond in Mei =

1937 film

- Directed by: Jaap Speyer
- Written by: Alexander Alexander; Willy Buchbinder
- Release date: 11 December 1936
- Running time: 70 minutes
- Country: Netherlands
- Language: Dutch

Op een Avond in Mei is a 1936 Dutch comedy film directed by Jaap Speyer. Shot in black-and-white, the film length is 2082 meters.

== Plot ==
Peter Gruber is a German tenor who, unable to find work, takes a job as a piano teacher. He soon falls in love with Daisy, one of his students. This is much to the dismay of her father, a dentist and widower, who catches them in the act while they are embracing. He is vehemently opposed to their relationship despite Peter’s talent. The couple carries on despite his protests, but conflicts soon erupt: their relationship takes a drastic turn, and when Peter has to go to Antwerp for a performance, Daisy follows him in disguise. They end up performing in a cabaret together. When her father finds out, he follows her, unaware of what awaits him there, for a certain Lola is waiting for him. Eventually, the father realizes how deeply in love Peter and Daisy are with each other and grants them the love they so cherish.

== Cast ==
- Johan Elsensohn as Dr. Hermann
- Cissy Van Bennekom as Daisy
- Adolphe Engers as Johan
- Henk Speyer as Peter Gruber
- Marie van Westerhoven as Grandma
- Minny Erfmann as Lola Meertens
- Henri de Vries as Prof. Berger
