= Bleeke Bet (1923 film) =

1923 film

- Directed by: Alex Benno
- Written by: Alex Benno; Herman Bouber
- Cinematography: H. W. Metman; H.W. Metman
- Release date: 24 August 1923
- Country: Netherlands
- Language: Silent

Bleeke Bet is a 1923 Dutch silent film directed by Alex Benno. The film is based on a play of the same name by Herman Bouber.

== Plot ==
Bleeke Bet is a middle-aged woman known to everyone in the Jordaan neighborhood. Everyone sees her as a woman with good intentions, but who also has a short temper from time to time. Much to Bet’s dismay, her daughter Jans is having an affair with Ko Monjé. She does everything she can to thwart this relationship, but receives no support from her husband Tinus, an alcoholic who befriends anyone who buys him a drink.

Bet contacts Van Zanten, a miser and slumlord. He promises to grant her wish of opening her own café if she ensures that Jans marries his son Hannes. Just before Ko is due to leave for England, Bet lies to her daughter, telling her that he has been spotted with two women by his side. Jans immediately breaks off the relationship and lets herself be persuaded to get engaged to Hannes. Van Zanten convinces her that the ship Ko was sailing on has sunk. One day, however, he returns alive to shore and is reunited with Jans.

== Cast ==
- Alida van Gijtenbeek - Bleeke Bet
- Jan van Dommelen - Tinus, haar man
- Beppie De Vries - Jans
- Riek Kloppenburg - Trui
- Piet Urban - Van Zanten
- Heintje Davids
- Herman Bouber - Sally Matteman
- Harry Boda - Ko Monjé
- Johan Elsensohn - Lucas
- Henriette Blazer - Meid (as Henriëtte Blazer)
- Gerardus van Weerdenburg - Hannes (as Kees van Dam)
- Kees Pruis - Eerste student
- Frans Bogaert - Tweede student
- John Timrott
- Emile Timrott
