= Willem van Oranje (film) =

- Directed by: Jan Teunissen
- Written by: H.J. Drayer; Jan Teunissen; G. van Gelder
- Produced by: Jan Teunissen
- Cinematography: Akos Farkas
- Music by: B. van Sigtenhorst-Meyer
- Release date: 4 January 1934
- Running time: 75 minutes
- Country: Netherlands
- Language: Dutch

Willem van Oranje is a 1934 Dutch drama film produced, co-written, and directed by Jan Teunissen. The film portrays the life of William the Silent, and the origins of the Dutch Revolt.

== Plot ==
William the Silent's campaigns against the Spaniards during the Eighty Years' War and his life shown in chronological order.

== Cast ==
- Cor Van der Lugt Melsert as William the Silent
- Willy Haak as Louise de Coligny
- Cor Hermus as Keizer Karel V
- Louise Kooiman as Juliana of Stolberg
- Cruys Voorbergh as Philip II of Spain
- Willem Huysmans as Mayor of Den Briel
- Daan Van Olleffen as Philibert van Brussel
- Vincent Berghegge as Antoine Perrenot de Granvelle
- Peter Hansen as Lodewijk Sigismund Vincent Gustaaf van Heiden (Russian: Ло́гин Петро́вич Ге́йден)

== See also ==
- Dutch films of the 1930s
