= Rudolf Nelson =

German composer (1878–1960)

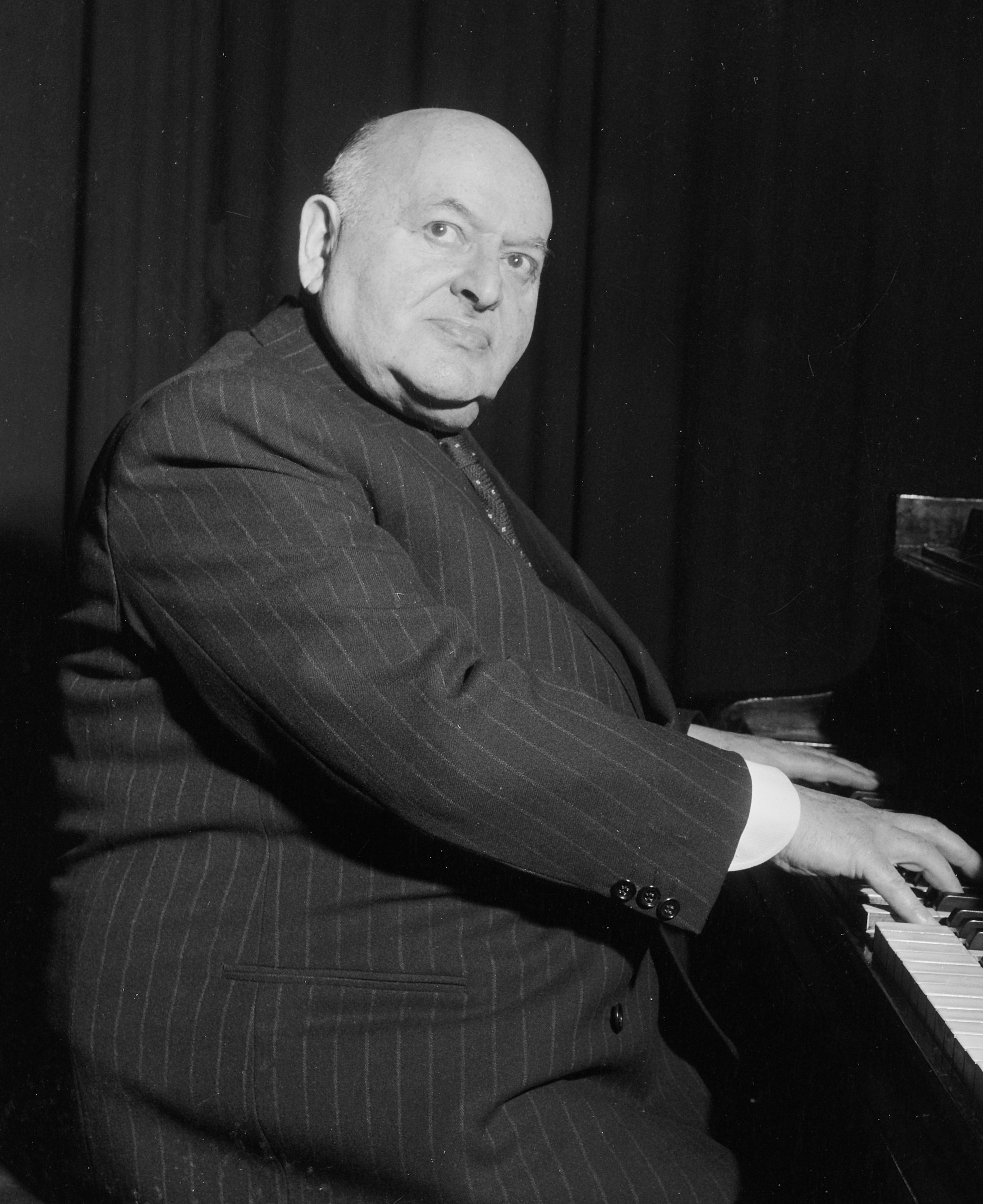
- Rudolf Nelson in 1953
- Born: Rudolf Lewysohn; 8 April 1878; Berlin, German Empire
- Died: 5 February 1960 (aged 81); West Berlin, West Germany
- Education: Stern Conservatory
- Occupation: Composer
- Spouse: Käthe Erlholz

Rudolf Nelson (8 April 1878 – 5 February 1960) was a German composer of hit songs, film music, operetta and vaudeville, and the founder and director of the Nelson Revue, a significant cabaret troupe on the 1930s Berlin nightlife scene.

== Biography ==
Issued from a poor Prussian Jewish family, and raised in Berlin, Nelson began piano lessons at a very young age.

After secondary school, while simultaneously earning a living as an apprentice and subsequently clerk, he received a scholarship from Heinrich von Herzogenberg to the Stern Conservatory.

Nelson first came into public view during this same period when, in a contest organized by the newspaper Die Woche, he was awarded first prize for the best composition of a walse.

But the real turning point came when Nelson discovered the Überbrettl, Berlin’s first cabaret founded by Ernst von Wolzogen. Inspired by the genre, he began his cabaret career at the Potsdamer Straße cabaret Roland, accompanying his own compositions on the piano.

In 1904, he joined forces with Paul Schneider-Duncker in the famed Chat Noir on Unter den Linden, Berlin’s most fashionable avenue, going on to direct it on his own from 1907 – 1914. It also is here that Nelson composed his most famous hit song Das Ladenmädel, as well as from 1908 onwards wrote his famous operetta works, notably Miss Dudelsack.

In 1909, Nelson married singer Käthe Erlholz. One year later Käthe Nelson gave birth to their son, Herbert. Herbert Nelson would later become one of many collaborative lyricists, a list that included Friedrich Hollaender.

In 1920, he opened the Nelson-Theater on Kurfürstendamm (associated with the Sans Soucis restaurant), together with Kurt Tucholsky. The revues he staged here are legend, presenting numerous top stars of the period, including names such as Josephine Baker, who appeared on 14 January 1926, Weintraubs Syncopators and comic Max Ehrlich. During these years, Nelson also composed revues for Berlin’s famed Metropol-Theater in the Admiralspalast.

Forced by the Nazis in 1933 to flee Germany – after stopping for stage appearances in Vienna and Zurich – Nelson founded a new theater troupe in Amsterdam, until after the German occupation. Sometime thereafter, he and his wife were interned in Westerbork concentration camp. Nelson survived the Holocaust, and in 1949 returned to Berlin where he reopened the Nelson-Revue-Gastspiel.

== Works ==
=== Revues ===
- Chauffeur ins Metropol!
- Hoheit amüsiert sich
- Wenn die Nacht beginnt
- Karussell
- Seifenblasen
- Was träumt Berlin?
- Die Peruanerin
- Halloh, halloh
- Zwölf Monate
- Total Manoli
- Bitte zahlen!
- Wir stehn verkehrt
- Confetti
- Madame Revue
- Es geht schon besser
- Die Nacht der Nächte
- Du u. ich
- Die Lichter v. Berlin
- Quick
- Der rote Faden
- Glück muß man haben
- Es hat geklingelt
- Etwas für Sie
- Rudolf Nelson erzählt

=== Operettas ===
- Miss Dudelsack; libretto by Fritz Grünbaum and Heinz Reichert
- Der Damenkrieg
- Incognito
- New York-Berlin
- Die Damen vom Olymp
- Die tanzenden Fräuleins

== Awards ==
- 1953: received into Ordre national du Mérite
- 1959: the Paul Lincke-Ring, a bi-annual award for light music composition

== Sources ==
- Keller O., Die Operette. Wien 1926
- Westermeyer K., Die Operette im Wandel der Zeiten. München 1931
- Bernauer R., Das Theater meines Lebens. Berlin 1955
- Schaeffers W., Tingeltangel. Ein Leben für die Kleinkunst. Hamburg 1959
- Jean-Marc Warszawski https://www.musicologie.org
