= Heintje Davids =

Dutch variety artist

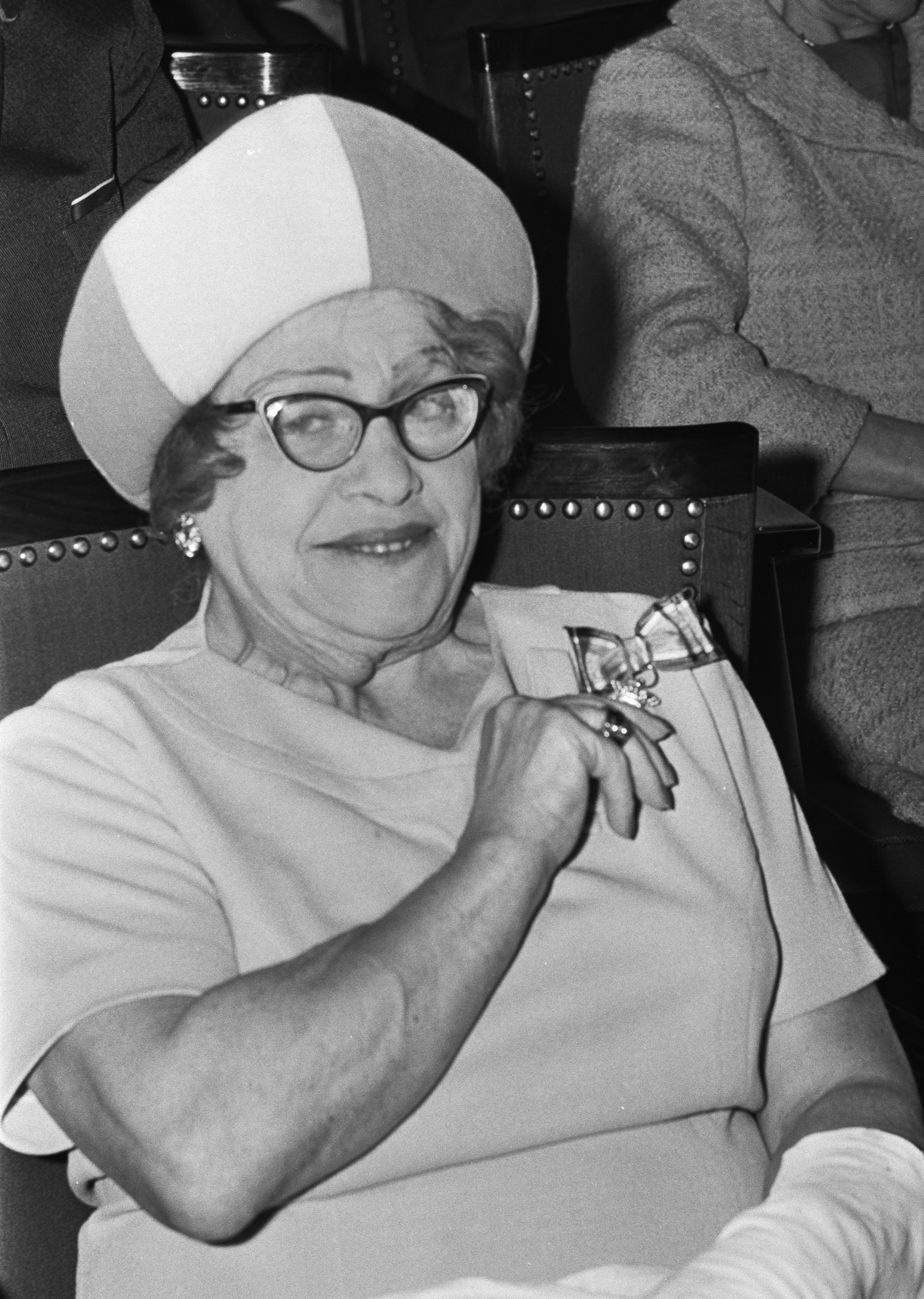
- Davids in 1968
- Born: Hendrika David; 13 February 1888; Rotterdam, the Netherlands
- Died: 14 February 1975 (aged 87)
- Other name: Henriëtte Davids

Heintje Davids (13 February 1888 – 14 February 1975), born Hendrika David, was a prominent Dutch variety artist, known for her career as a singer and comedian from 1907 until her death. Performing under the name Henriëtte Davids, she gained widespread fame as Heintje Davids. Her most popular songs included "Zandvoort bij de zee," "Draait," and "Because I Love You So Much," the latter a duet with Sylvain Poons.

Davids officially retired on 25 September 1954, with a farewell performance at the Tuschinski Theatre, where notable artists like Wim Kan, Wim Sonneveld, Toon Hermans, and Max Tailleur also appeared. Despite her retirement, Davids repeatedly returned to the stage, continuing to perform into the 1960s. Her frequent comebacks led to the coining of the term "Heintje Davids effect," referring to the phenomenon of repeatedly announcing a farewell only to return to performing.

== Early life ==
Heintje Davids was born into a Jewish family in Rotterdam as the youngest child of Levie David, a comedian and café owner, and Francina Terveen, a waitress. Her family was deeply involved in the performing arts, with her siblings Louis, Hakkie, and Rika forming the Davids Family Theatre. Despite the family's theatrical background, Heintje, who was short, stout, and had a distinctively comedic voice, was initially deemed unfit for the stage by her parents.

== Career ==
In 1907, Heintje Davids defied her family's expectations and embarked on a career as a comic revue singer. Her persistence paid off, and by 1910, she was performing alongside her brother Louis. The duo became well-known, though their partnership eventually ended when Louis shifted his focus to cabaret. Despite this, Heintje continued to build her career independently, gaining widespread popularity.

Heintje Davids was a staple of the Dutch variety scene before World War II, performing in various revues, particularly at the Hollandsche Schouwburg and the Tip Top Theater. She also appeared in the 1934 film adaptation of the folk musical De Jantjes.

=== Personal life ===
In 1914, Heintje Davids married journalist and playwright Philip Pinkhof. The couple's marriage lasted until Pinkhof's death in 1956.

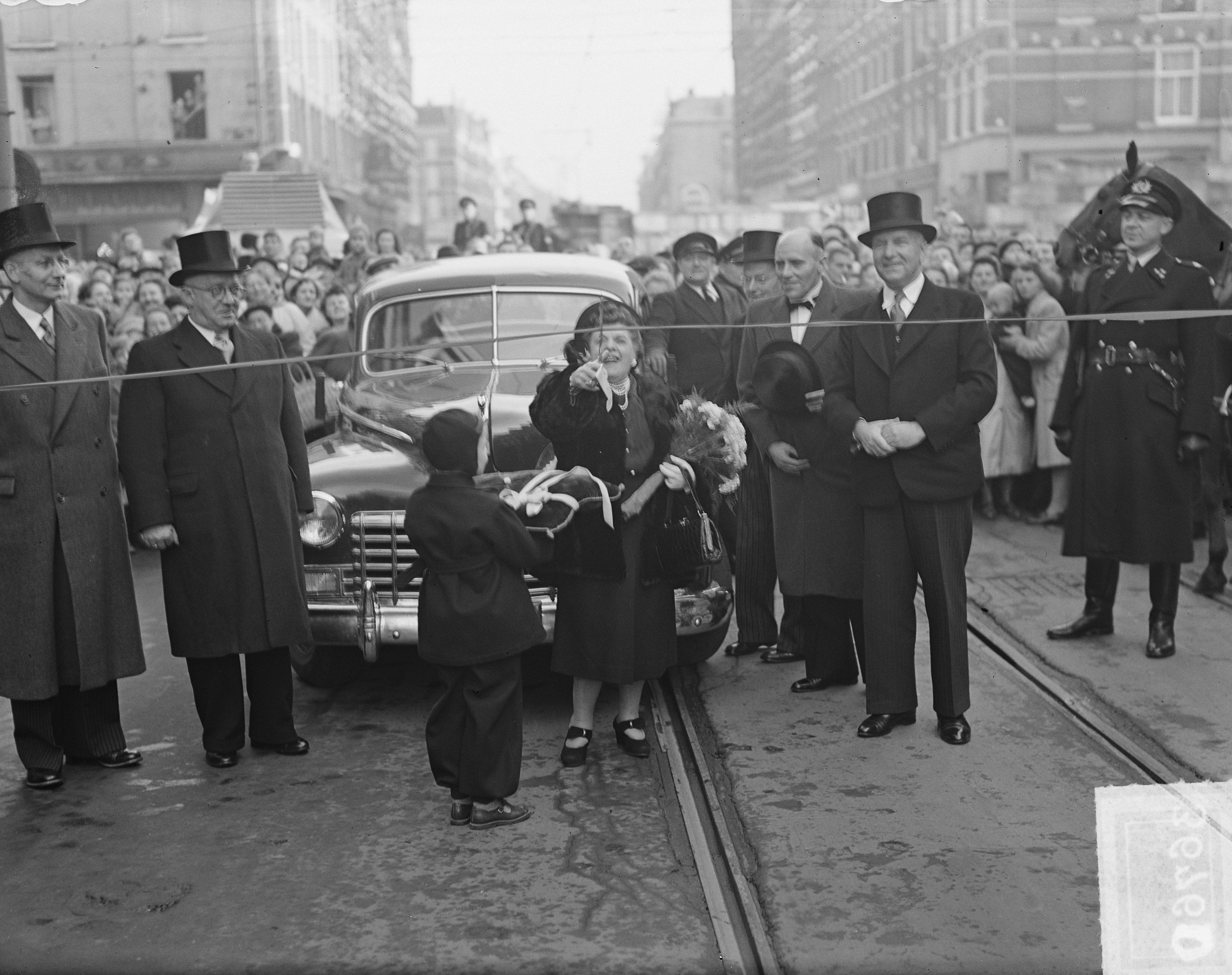

=== World War II and survival ===
During World War II, as the Nazi occupation of the Netherlands intensified, Heintje and her husband went into hiding in 1942 to escape persecution. Unlike most of her family, who perished in concentration camps, Heintje survived the war. Her brother Louis had already died in 1939, and her siblings Rika and Hakkie were killed during the Holocaust.

=== Post-war career ===
After the war, Heintje Davids resumed her career, performing the pre-war repertoire that had made her famous. In 1948, the city of Rotterdam honored her contributions to Dutch theater by awarding her the Louis Davidsring, a tribute to her family's impact on the arts. During her official farewell performance in 1954, she passed the ring to comedian Wim Kan.

Despite her official retirement, Heintje Davids made numerous comebacks, continuing to perform into the 1960s. Her repeated returns to the stage led to the coining of the "Heintje Davids effect," a term used to describe the phenomenon of continually announcing retirement only to return to performing.

In the 1950s, she frequently collaborated with Amsterdam comedian Max Tailleur at his cabaret café, De Doofpot.

== Death ==
Heintje Davids died on 14 February 1975, leaving a legacy as one of the most beloved and enduring figures in Dutch entertainment.

== Notable works ==
Among her best-known songs are:

- "Zandvoort bij de zee"
- "Draait"
- "Because I Love You So Much" (duet with Sylvain Poons)

== Legacy ==
Heintje Davids remains an iconic figure in Dutch culture, remembered for her unique voice, comedic talent, and the resilience that characterized both her career and personal life. The "Heintje Davids effect" continues to be referenced in Dutch popular culture.

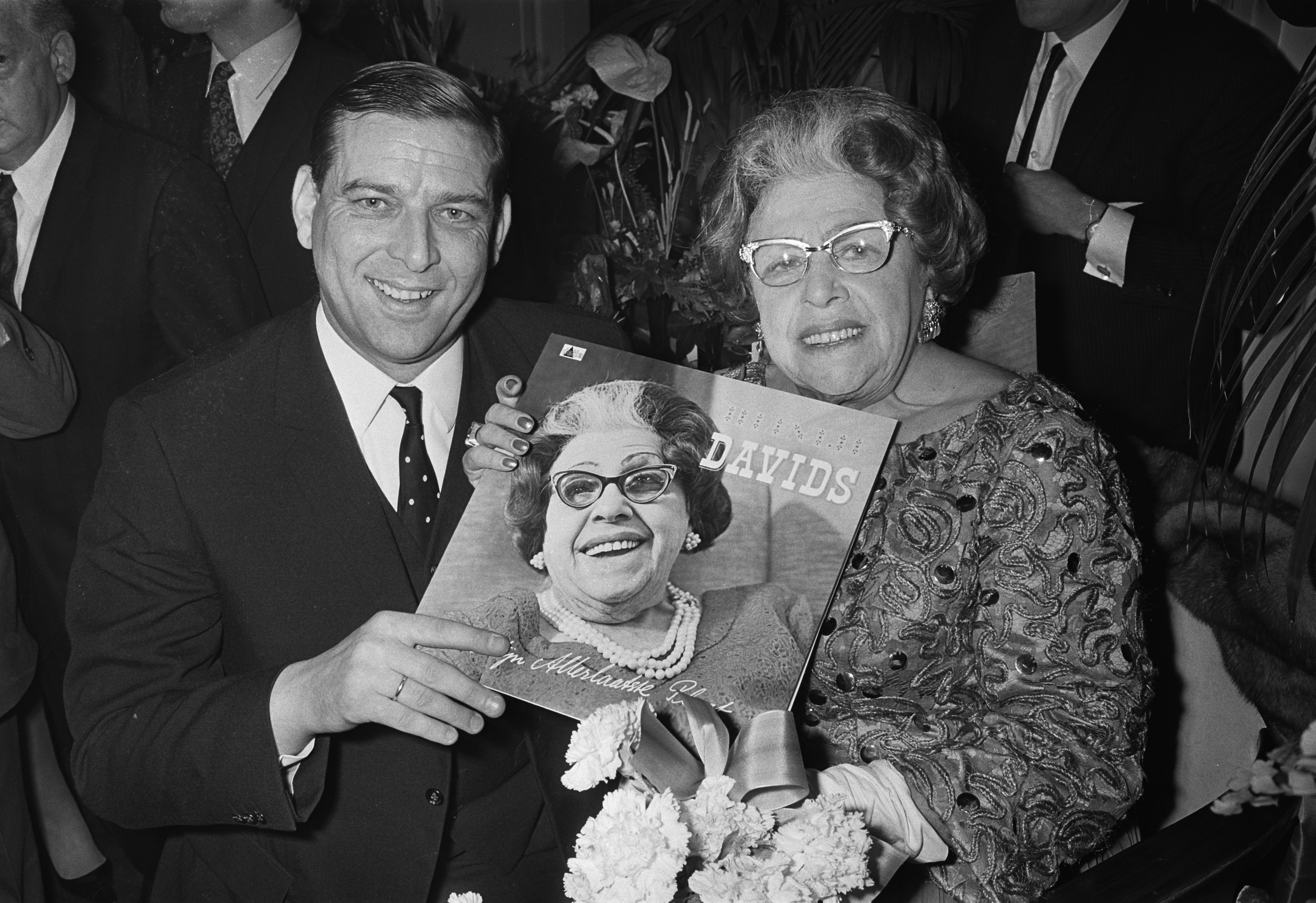
Heintje Davids with an elpee celebrating her 80th birthday

== Filmography ==
- De Jantjes (1934)
- Op Stap (1935) – Mrs. Fortune
- The Piglet of the Regiment (1935) – Annemie
- Fairground Guests (1936) – Annie
- A Kingdom for a House (1949) – Heintje Blom

== Discography (selection) ==
- 1922 – What a woman cares about (From the revue Cut back if you please) / Never touch anything with your family – 78 rpm 12-inch single – Vox – H 10001
- 1922 – Da kommt das Militär / O jé Marie (with Kees Pruis) – 78 rpm 12-inch single – Vox – H 10002
- 1934 – Spin / Because I Love You So Much – 78 rpm 10" Single – Cinetone – ?
- 1954 – Farewell Sounds, part 1 / Farewell sounds, part 2 – 78 rpm 10-inch single – Philips – P 17324 H
- 1959 – Heintje in St. Germain des Prés: Because I love you so much & 't Is waar (C'est vrai) / Monologue (Lyrics: Tom Manders) & Draait – 7-inch EP – His Master's Voice – 7 EGH 184
- 1965 – Adieu / Daar iets niet right – 7-inch single – Franklin D. Roosevelt – R 1002
- 1967 – My Last Record – 12-inch LP – Delta – DKS 1004 (reissued in 1975 as Her Very Last Record – 12-inch LP – Negram – NR 108)
- 1968 – Er is maar één Carré / Naar Carré – 7-inch single – Polydor – S 1268
