= The Bluejackets =

1922 film

- Directed by: Maurits Binger; B. E. Doxat-Pratt
- Written by: Maurits Binger; Herman Bouber
- Release date: 17 March 1922
- Running time: 85 minutes
- Country: Netherlands
- Language: Silent

The Bluejackets (Dutch: De Jantjes) is a 1922 Dutch silent film directed by Maurits Binger based on a play of the same name by Herman Bouber. The film is considered largely lost, with only a single fragment known to exist, which is kept at the Eye Filmmuseum.

== Plot ==
Dries, Toon, and Schele Manus return from the Dutch East Indies, and celebrate their return in the Jordaan. They quickly discover however that their girlfriends have not been faithful to them when they were gone, and that work is rare to come by.

== Cast ==
- Beppie De Vries - Blonde Greet
- Maurits de Vries - Dolle Dries
- Johan Elsensohn - De Schele, de verloofde van Toffe Jans
- Louis Davids - De Blauwe
- Piet Urban - De Mop
- Adriënne Solser - Na Druppel
- André van Dijk - Leendert
- Paula de Waart - Moeder van De Blauwe
- Beppie Murray - Doortje
- Hans Bruning - Vader van De Blauwe
- Greta Meyer - Toffe Jans
- Chris Laurentius - Oom Gerrit
- Riek Kloppenburg - Tante Piet
- Ka Bos - Betje, kaartlegster
- Matthieu van Eysden

== Gallery ==
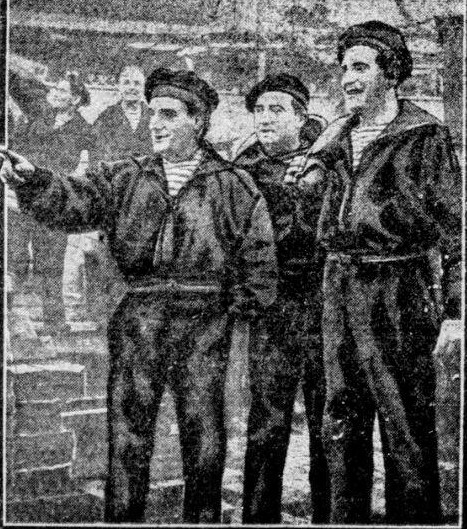

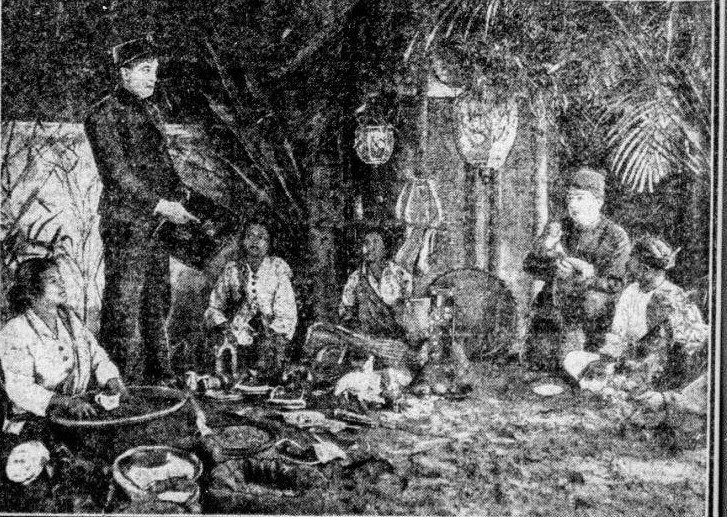
