= Oranje Hein (1936 film) =

- Directed by: Max Nosseck
- Written by: Herman Bouber (play), Leo Meyer (writer)
- Release date: 22 October 1936
- Country: Netherlands
- Language: Dutch

Oranje Hein is a 1936 Dutch film directed by Max Nosseck.

== Plot ==
Oranje Hein is a shoemaker from the Jordaan who is married to Aal. Their neighbors are Thijs and Ant van der Spil. Together they have a daughter, Mientje, who thinks her boyfriend Herman is ashamed of her. He thinks his mother looks down on her because she’s from the Jordaan, but it turns out they get along just fine. Ant is considering divorcing her husband because he is almost always drunk and aggressive. One evening, she seeks refuge with her parents, Kees and Massie, who are disappointed in the busy nightlife of their daughter Dien, a flower girl. They want her to marry Dorus, but she is not interested in him. She’d rather be with Jan Tollenaar, a wealthy and cultured musician.

After yet another drunken brawl, Ant decides to leave Thijs. Just as he is in a drunken rage, Herman drops by with his mother. She is shocked by the environment in which his girlfriend is growing up and advises him to find someone else. Thijs soon regrets his behavior and finds it hard to cope with his loneliness. He promises Ant he’ll never drink again, but she doesn’t believe him and doesn’t call off the divorce. Meanwhile, Dien is over the moon with Jan and doesn’t realize that he’s just using her and is actually in a relationship with Lola. Later, she finds out that he’s gone to Rotterdam for work without telling her.

During Kees and Massie’s 40th wedding anniversary party, Thijs shows up. Although he’s been sober for weeks now, no one wants anything to do with him. Feeling dejected, he heads back to the bar for the first time in ages to get drunk. He then returns to the party and ruins the atmosphere with his aggressive behavior, eventually ending up in a fight with Kees. Ant rushes outside to put a stop to it, but falls down the stairs and is seriously injured.

Meanwhile, Dien travels to Rotterdam to confront Jan. He claims the assignment came unexpectedly, but she doesn’t believe him. She asks him about Lola, a girl who flirted with him all evening in Amsterdam, but he says he hasn’t seen her since. When she sees her standing behind him, she slaps him and leaves. However, she has missed the last train to Amsterdam and has to spend the night in Rotterdam. Kees and Massie are very worried about her, and in a fit of rage, he kicks Dien out of the house after she returns. She moves in with Oranje Hein and Aaf and is reunited with Dorus. Ant too eventually decides to forgive Thijs.

== Cast ==
- Herman Bouber ... Oranje Hein
- Aaf Bouber ... Aal
- Johan Elsensohn ... Thijs van der Spil, fishmonger
- Annie Verhulst ... Ant van der Spil
- Sylvain Poons ... Uncle Bram
- Fien Berghegge (as Fientje Berghegge)
- Max Croiset
- Harry Boda
- Clara Vischer-Blaaser (as Clara Vischer)
