= Bleeke Bet (1934 film) =

- Directed by: Alex Benno and Richard Oswald
- Written by: Alex Benno (screenplay), Herman Bouber (dialogue)
- Release date: 7 September 1934
- Running time: 111 minutes
- Country: Netherlands
- Language: Dutch

Bleeke Bet is a 1934 Dutch comedy film directed by Alex Benno and Richard Oswald.

== Plot ==
The film is set in the Jordaan neighborhood. Bet owns a produce shop and also runs an illegal margarine business on the side with the slumlord Van Santen. She wants to set her daughter Jans up with Hannes, Van Santen’s son, who is in love with her. Jans, however, is engaged to Ko, a sailor who fails to impress Bet. Van Santen promises her a share in one of his many lucrative schemes if she puts a stop to her daughter’s relationship with Ko and convinces her to go out with Hannes. Jans, however, is deeply in love with Ko and is therefore impervious to her mother’s attempts to badmouth him.

Jans secretly arranges to meet Ko, but he is held up at a meeting and doesn’t show up. She feels hurt and cuts off contact with him after Bet and her cousin lie, claiming they saw him out with two girls. Ka, another resident of the house, sees through Bet’s plan and tries in vain to convince Jans of the truth. Bet then forces her daughter to marry Hannes. Jans barely knows Hannes and meets with Ko one last time. They meet at night and settle their quarrel. The next day, he sets sail.

Suddenly, the sad news arrives that Ko’s ship has sunk. Three months later, Bet receives a telegram from him, in which he reports that he is recovering. She asks Van Santen for advice. They decide to let the residents of the Jordaan believe that Ko has drowned, so that Jans and Hannes will still get married. Not long after, Jans finally yields to her mother’s wishes. Ka is furious when she hears that Jans is to marry Hannes and makes it clear that it is disrespectful for her to marry someone else so soon after Ko’s supposed death.

Just before Jans and Hannes’s wedding, Ko reappears in the Jordaan. Jans is already wearing her wedding dress when she hears that Ko is still very much alive. She immediately throws herself into his arms, and a joyful reunion ensues. Bet is stunned when Ko stands before her. When news also arrives that Van Santen has been arrested for his schemes, she bursts into tears and announces she’s going to kill herself, but Tinus stops her from doing so. In the end, everything turns out well: Ko and Jans get married. Ka launches a career in cabaret and introduces her future husband, Max.

== Cast ==
- Aaf Bouber ... Bleeke Bet
- Jopie Koopman ... Jans
- Johan Elsensohn ... Tinus
- Fien de la Mar ... Ka (as Fientje de la Mar)
- Johannes Heesters ... Ko Monje (as Johan Heesters)
- Sylvain Poons ... Sally
- Clara Vischer-Blaaser ... Trui (as Clara Fischer)
- Lau Ezerman ... Lucas (as Lou Ezerman)
- Corry Vonk ... Leentje (as Corrie Vonk)
- Cor Hermus ... Van Santen
- Jan Lemaire Jr. ... Hannes
- Jan Van Ees ... Max
