= Herman Bouber =

Dutch actor, screenwriter and playwright (1885–1963)

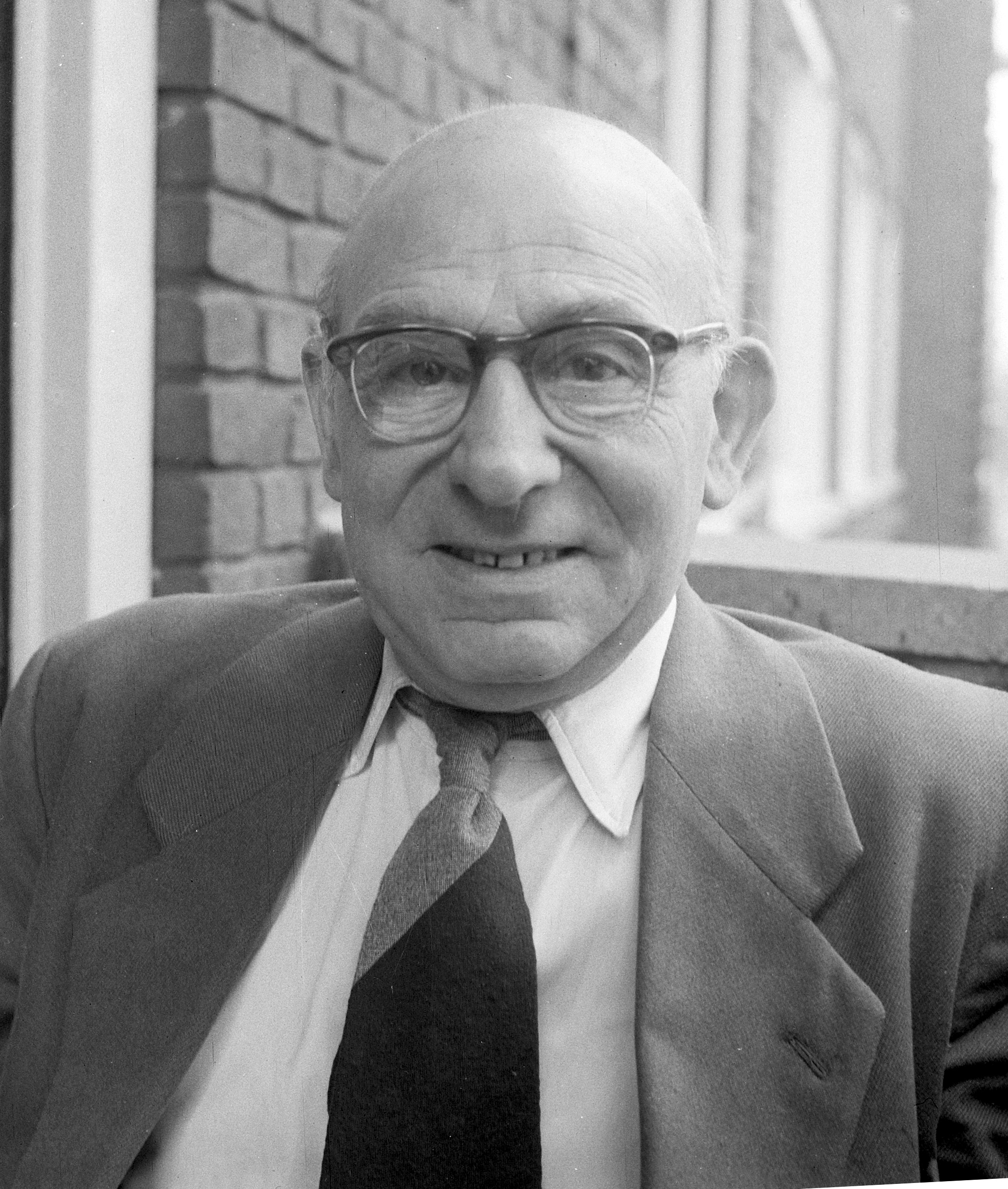
- Herman Bouber
- Born: September 24, 1885; Amsterdam, Netherlands
- Died: February 2, 1963 (aged 77); Amsterdam, Netherlands
- Occupations: Actor; Screenwriter; Playwright
- Spouse: Aaf Bouber (m. 1907)

Herman Bouber, born Hermanus Blom (24 September 1885, Amsterdam – 2 February 1963, Amsterdam) was a Dutch actor, screenwriter and playwright. He was married to the actress Aaf Bouber.

== Filmography ==
Actor

- Bleeke Bet (1923) as Sally Matteman
- Oranje Hein (1925)
- Waar een Wil Is, Is een Weg! (1931)
- Oranje Hein (1936) as Oranje Hein
- The Trouble With Money (1936) as Brand
- The Three Wishes (1937) as Campagni, Chef van de Claque
- Vadertje Langbeen (1938)
- Boefje (1939)
- Sterren stralen overal (1953)
- The Village on the River (1958) as Nardje

Screenwriter

- The Bluejackets (1922)
- Oranje Hein (1925)
- De Vier Mullers (1934)
- Bleeke Bet (1934)
- De Big van het Regiment (1939)

== Bibliography ==
- Giddins, Gary. Natural Selection: Gary Giddins on Comedy, Film, Music, And Books. Oxford University Press, 2006.
- Mathijs, Ernest. The Cinema of the Low Countries. Wallflower Press, 2004.
