= List of Dutch films of the 1920s =

This is a list of films produced in the Netherlands during the 1920s. The films are produced in the Dutch language.

Title	Year	Director	Cast	Genre	Notes
1920
Helleveeg	1920	Theo Frenkel	Mien Duymear van Twist; Co Balfoort	Drama	
Liefdesintriges					
Bijna een Dubbele Moord in Lutjebroek		Harry Waghalter	Frensky; Henri le Dent		Short film
De Vrouw van de Minister		Maurits Binger	Mary Odette; Annie Bos		Dutch-English production
Wat Eeuwig Blijft		Maurits Binger	Reginald Barton; Constance Worth		Dutch-English production
Zo als ik Ben		Maurits Binger	Mary Odette; Henry Victor		
Schakels		Maurits Binger	Jan van Dommelen; Annie Bos	Drama	
Het Verborgen Leven		Maurits Binger	Annie Bos; Adelqui Migliar		
Voorbeschikten		Tonny Stevens	Jan van Ees	Drama	
Aan boord van de Sabine		Theo Frenkel	Lily Bouwmeester; Frits Bouwmeester	Drama	Film is missing/lost
De Dood van Pierrot		Theo Frenkel			
Geef ons Kracht		Theo Frenkel	Co Balfoort		

Title	Year	Director	Cast	Genre	Notes
1921
De Zwarte Tulp	1921	Maurits Binger; B.E.Doxat-Pratt	Dio Huysmans; Zoe Palmer	Historical drama	After the book by Alexandre Dumas, père
Hard Tegen Hard		B.E. Doxat-Pratt	Edmund Gwenn; Mary Clare		Dutch-English production
De Heldendaad van Peter Wells		Maurits Binger	O. B. Clarence; Heather Thatcher		Dutch-English production
Een Lach en een Traan		B.E. Doxat-Pratt	Evelyn Brent; Adelqui Migliar		Dutch-English production
BloedGeld		Fred Goodwins	Adelqui Migliar		Dutch-English production
Menschenwee		Theo Frenkel	Willem van der Veer; Coen Hissink; Kitty Kluppell		
Onder Spiritistischen Dwang		Maurits Binger	Zoe Palmer; Adelqui Migliar		Nederlands-Engelse productie
Rechten der Jeugd		Maurits Binger	Annie Bos; Adelqui Migliar		
Het Waterrad des Doods		Dick Laan	Dick Laan	Youth drama	Also named Nick Cartner
Zaken Zijn Zaken		Frank Richardson	Henry Victor; Maudie Dunham; Lily Bouwmeester		Dutch-English production
Sister Brown		Maurits Binger	Marjorie Villis; Rolf Leslie		
1922
Mottige Janus	1922	Maurits Binger	Maurits de Vries; Kitty Klupell	Drama	
Alexandra		Theo Frenkel	Margit Barnay; Paul de Groot		Dutch-German production
Bulldog Drummond		Oscar Apfel	Evelyn Greeley		Dutch-English production
De Jantjes		Maurits Binger; B.E.Doxat-Pratt	Louis Davids; Maurits de Vries	Drama; Comedy	
De Bruut		Theo Frenkel	Willem van der Veer	Drama	
Gij Zult Niet Doden		George Beranger	Gertrude McCoy		Dutch-English production
Gloria Fatalis		Johan Gildemeijer	Emmy Arbous		Dutch-German production
In den Nacht		Frank Richardson	C.M. Hallard; Dorothy Fane		Dutch-English production
De Leugen van Pierrot		Maurits Binger	Adelqui Migliar	Drama	
The Man in the Background		Ernst Winar	Eduard Ijdo		Dutch-German production
1923
Bleeke Bet	1923	Alex Benno	Alida van Gijtenbeek; Jan van Dommelen		
Farizeëers		Charles Giblyn	Wyndham Standing; Mary Odette		Dutch-English production
Judith		Theo Frenkel	Helena Makowska		Dutch-German production
Kee en Janus in Berlijn		Alex Benno	Adriënne Solser	Comedy	
De Leeuw en de Muis		Oscar Apfel	Wyndham Standing; Mary Odette	Crime	Dutch-English production
Frauenmoral		Theo Frenkel	Olga Engl		Dutch-German production
1924
Mooi Juultje van Volendam	1924	Alex Benno	Annie Bos	Drama	
Amsterdam bij Nacht		Theo Frenkel	Willem van der Veer; Agnès Marou; Kitty Kluppell		
Bet, de Koningin van de Jordaan		Adriënne Solser	Adriënne Solser		
Het Hollandse Circus		Theo Frenkel	Louis Bouwmeester	Comedy; Drama	
Kee en Janus naar Parijs		Alex Benno	Adriënne Solser; Piet Köhler		
Op hoop van zegen		James Bauer; Henk Kleinmann	Adele Sandrock	Fishermen's drama	Dutch-German production
1925
Oranje Hein	1925	Alex Benno	Johan Elsensohn		
Achter de Wolken Schijnt de Zon		Willy Mullens	B. A. Huijsers		Documentary
De Cabaret-prinses		Theo Frenkel	Emmy Arbous		
1926
Moderne Landhaaien	1926	Alex Benno	Kees Pruis; Jan Grootveld		
Artistenrevue		Alex Benno	Alex de Meester; Isodoor Zwaaf		
Bet Trekt 100.000		Piet Hulsman	Adriënne Solser	Comedy	Dutch-Belgian production
Droom Koninkje		Henk Kleinmann	Henkie Klein; Willem van der Veer		Dutch-German production
1927
Bet Zit in de Penarie	1927	André Boesnach	Adriënne Solser	Comedy	Dutch-Belgian production
De Zaanstreek		Theo Güsten			Documentary about the Zaanstreek
1928
Een Nacht op het Duivelsbed	1928				
Bet naar de Olympiade		André Boesnach	Adriënne Solser		
1929
Branding	1929	Mannus Franken; Joris Ivens		Documentary	
De Maarschalkstaf		Luc Willink	Nico de Jong		
Regen		Joris Ivens		Documentary	
