= List of Dutch films of the 1940s =

This is a list of films produced in the Netherlands during the 1940s. The films are produced in the Dutch language.

Title	Year	Director	Cast	Genre	Notes
1940
Ergens in Nederland	1940	Ludwig Berger	Lily Bouwmeester; Rini Otte	Drama; War	
Rembrandt		Gerard Rutten	Jules Verstraeten	Biographical film	
Notre Dame van de sloppen		Robert Peguy			
1942
Zeven jongens en een oude schuit	1942	G. Gerritsen		Youth film	
De Laatste Dagen van een Eiland		Ernst Winar		Drama; Romance	
1943
Richard knapt het op	1943	Henk van der Linden		Youth film	
Dick Bos: Valsch Geld		Alfred Mazure			Semi-amateur film

Title	Year	Director	Cast	Genre	Notes
1944
Drie Weken Huisknecht	1944	Walter Smith	Matthieu van Eysden	Comedy	
1946
Bezet Gebied	1946				
Dick Bos: Moord in het Modehuis		Alfred Mazure			Semi-amateur film
1947
Dik Trom en zijn dorpsgenoten		Ernst Winar			
1948
Niet Tevergeefs	1948	Edmond T. Greville		War; Resistance	
Vijftig jaren					
Nederlands in zeven lessen		Charles Huguenot van der Linden; Heinz Josephson	Audrey Hepburn		
1949
A Kingdom For a Horse	1949	Jaap Speyer	Heintje Davids; Johan Kaart	Comedy	
