= Menschenwee =

Menschenwee may refer to:

- Menschenwee (novel)
- Menschenwee (film)
