= The Wreck in the North Sea =

- Directed by: Theo Frenkel
- Written by: Theo Frenkel
- Release date: 5 November 1915
- Running time: 60 minutes
- Country: Netherlands
- Language: Silent

The Wreck in the North Sea (Dutch: Het wrak van de Noorzee) is a 1915 Dutch silent drama film directed by Theo Frenkel.

It is a short romantic silent movie, about a fisherman called Arend who leaves his beloved Marie to fish again in the North Sea for his work. The desperate Jan van der Velde (who secretly loves Marie) has sabotaged Arend's boat before he leaves. It sinks, and Marie never hears of him again. She finds some comfort in Jan's embrace, but later hears of Jan's sabotage. Jan gets arrested, but then comes good news, Arend is still alive and returns into Marie's arms.

== Cast ==
- Julie Meijer ... Marie
- Kees Lageman ... Rooseveldt
- Wilhelmina Kleij ... Mrs. Rooseveldt
- Jaap Van der Poll ... Arend
- Piet Fuchs ... Jan van der Velde
- Coen Hissink ... Duiker / Diver
- Yard Van Staalduynen ... Rechter van instructie / Magistrate
- Aaf Bouber ... Bruid van Bruinsma / Bride of Bruinsma
- Thibault Bigot Jr.
- Willem Faassen
- Frits Fuchs
- Mrs. Kloppenberg
- Jacques van Hoven
