= Fatum (1915 film) =

- Directed by: Theo Frenkel
- Written by: Johan Gildemeijer
- Release date: 14 May 1915
- Running time: 70 minutes
- Country: Netherlands
- Language: Silent

Fatum is a 1915 Dutch silent drama film directed by Theo Frenkel. The film is presumed to be lost.

== Plot ==
The film tells the story of Kobus Drost, a wealthy farmer. One day, he receives a letter from his cousin Verbeek, who urgently requests his help in renovating his cabin. He visits him in Volendam and falls head over heels for his cousin's housekeeper, Anna. He manages to persuade his cousin to give him permission to bring the girl home with him. Once back in the countryside, Anna goes to work as a farm girl. Kobus's sister is not impressed by her and regularly plays tricks on her, along with the other staff. Kobus tries to protect Anna.

At one point, Kobus discovers that farmhand Arend has his eye on Anna. To eliminate the competition, he sends him into military service. During Arend's absence, Kobus seizes the opportunity to propose to Anna. Anna agrees and becomes the boss of the staff, to the detriment of the workers. When Arend returns to the farm while on leave, he is shocked by the changes that have taken place there. Krelis, a farmhand recently fired by Kobus, witnesses Arend's secret meeting with Anna. He decides to use this to take revenge on his boss.

One evening, while Kobus and Krelis are sitting in an inn, Krelis tells him that he was lied to by Anna and that she is actually having an affair with Arend. Kobus is furious and returns home to get his gun. He then goes to the very spot where Anna and Arend went as friends, where he fatally shoots Arend. Anna returns home saddened but is not let in by Kobus's sister and therefore leaves. Meanwhile, Kobus is sentenced to two years in prison.

After Kobus has served his sentence, he returns home. He is no longer himself and one day travels to Amsterdam, where he wanders around for hours. He eventually ends up in a dance hall on the Zeedijk. He refuses to dance there, until he suddenly sees his wife.

== Cast ==
- Louis Bouwmeester ... Kobus Drost
- Wilhelmina Kleij ... Zus van Kobus Drost / Kobus Drost's sister
- John Timrott ... Arend
- August Van den Hoeck ... Kees Nieman
- Heintje Davids ... Danseres / Dancer
- Louis Davids ... Danspartner / Dance partner
- Julia Ude ... Trijn
- Aaf Bouber
- Piet Fuchs
- Coen Hissink
- Julie Meijer (as Julia Frenkel-Meyer)
- Jaap Van der Poll
- Yard Van Staalduynen

== Background ==
In the early 1910s, cinema owner Johan Gildemeijer wrote the script for Fatum and enlisted the help of Theo Frenkel, a recent refugee from Germany fleeing the outbreak of the First World War, to film it. The film premiered in 1915 and became a reasonable success. It was shown often throughout the next few years, including as late as 1934. After the release of this film, Frenkel became known as one of the most internationally recognized Dutch film directors.
