= Ray of sunshine =

Ray of sunshine may refer to:

- Sunbeam, a beam of sunlight
- Ray of Sunshine, a 1919 Dutch film
- "A Ray of Sunshine", song by Wham! from the 1983 album Fantastic

== See also ==
- Deò-ghrèine (Scottish Gaelic for "ray of sunshine")
- A Little Ray of Sunshine, a 1898 play by Mark Ambient
- "A Little Ray of Sunshine", a 1970 song by Axiom
- "Rae of Sunshine", an episode of That's So Raven
