= Oranje Hein =

Oranje Hein may refer to:

- Oranje Hein (1925 film), a 1925 Dutch film
- Oranje Hein (1936 film), a 1936 Dutch film
