= Forty Years =

Veertig Jaren
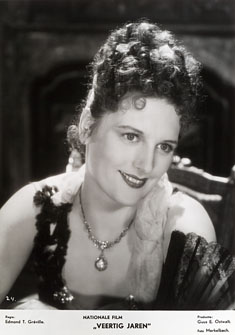
- Directed by: Edmond T. Gréville
- Written by: Jo van Ammers-Küller, Ben van Eysselsteijn
- Release date: 28 August 1938
- Running time: 85 minutes
- Country: Netherlands
- Language: Dutch

Forty Years or Veertig Jaren is a 1938 Dutch film directed by Edmond T. Gréville.

== Cast ==
- Cees Laseur ... Rolf van Meerle
- Lily Bouwmeester ... Annetje Maasdonk
- Matthieu van Eysden ... Frans Maasdonk
- Ank van der Moer ... Eline Verhulst
- Eduard Verkade ... Zijne excellentie van Meerle
- Adolphe Engers ... Jan de Oude
- Paul Steenbergen ... Wim Maasdonk
- Cor Van der Lugt Melsert ... Dick Maasdonk
- Martha Posno ... Lottie van Meerle
- Myra Ward ... Lily Burger
