= Sun Is Shining =

Sun Is Shining may refer to:

- "Sun Is Shining" (Bob Marley and the Wailers song), 1971 song by Bob Marley & the Wailers, later remixed by Funkstar De Luxe in 1999
- "Sun Is Shining" (Axwell and Ingrosso song), 2015
- "Sun Is Shining" (The Fireman song), 2008
- "Sun Is Shining" (Lost Frequencies song), 2019
- "The Sun Is Shining", 1957 song by Jimmy Reed

== See also ==
- "Sun Is Still Shining", 1969 song by the Moody Blues
- Behind the Clouds the Sun Is Shining, in Dutch Achter de wolken schijnt de zon, 1925 Dutch silent documentary film directed by Willy Mullens
