= Zonnestraal =

Zonnestraal may refer to:

- Zonnestraal (estate), a 1925 estate and former sanatorium in Hilversum, Netherlands
- Ray of Sunshine, a 1919 Dutch silent film directed by Theo Frenkel
