= Life's Shadows =

Life's Shadows may refer to:

- Life's Shadows (1916 Dutch film), a silent crime film directed by Theo Frenkel
- Life's Shadows (1916 American film), a silent drama film directed by William Nigh
