= Kee en Janus naar Parijs =

1924 film

- Directed by: Alex Benno
- Written by: Alex Benno
- Release date: 11 January 1924
- Country: Netherlands
- Language: Silent

Kee en Janus naar Parijs is a 1924 Dutch silent comedy film directed by Alex Benno.

== Cast ==
- Alie Blanket
- Rafael Bouwmeester - (as Rafaël Bouwmeester)
- Hans Bruning
- Beppie De Vries
- Johan Elsensohn - Hein Brommerd alias de Jatter
- Piet Köhler - Janus Meiblom
- Frans Meermans
- Jan Nooy - Rinus Kous
- Louis Richard - Kees, Kee Mols zoon
- Adrienne Solser - Kee Mol
- André van Dijk
- Kees Weerdenburg - Gerrit de Slome
- Cor Weerdenburg-Smit - Griet, Gerrits vrouw
- Sophie Willemse - Kee, Kee Mols dochter
- Geertruida Zonneveld - Bruidsmeisje

== See also ==
- Kee en Janus naar Berlijn (1923)
