= Kee en Janus naar Berlijn =

1923 film

- Directed by: Alex Benno
- Written by: Alex Benno
- Release date: 5 January 1923
- Country: Netherlands
- Language: Silent

Kee en Janus naar Berlijn is a 1923 Dutch silent film directed by Alex Benno.

== Cast ==
- Adriënne Solser - Kee Mol
- Kees Pruis - Janus Mol

== See also ==
- Kee en Janus naar Parijs (1924)
