= Taras Bulba (1924 film) =

1924 film

- Directed by: Vladimir Strizhevsky
- Written by: Nikolai Gogol (short story); Vladimir Strizhevsky
- Produced by: Joseph N. Ermolieff
- Starring: J.N. Douvan-Tarzow; Oscar Marion; Clementine Plessner; Helena Makowska
- Cinematography: Fritz Biller; Rudolf Schlesinger
- Music by: Felix Bartsch
- Production companies: Ermolieff-Film; Orbis-Film
- Release date: 1924
- Country: Germany
- Languages: Silent; German intertitles

Taras Bulba is a 1924 German silent adventure film directed by Vladimir Strizhevsky and starring J.N. Douvan-Tarzow, Oscar Marion and Clementine Plessner. It is based on the short story Taras Bulba by Nikolai Gogol, and made at the Emelka Studios in Munich. It was one of several Russian-themed films that exiled producer Ermolieff made in Munich during the 1920s.

The film's art direction was by Kurt Dürnhöfer and Willy Reiber.

== Cast ==
- J.N. Douvan-Tarzow as Taras Bulba
- Oscar Marion as Andry, Son of Taras
- Clementine Plessner as Bulba's Wife
- Helena Makowska as Panotschka
- N.N. Novitzky as Woiwode
- Alexander Polonsky as Jankel, Innkeeper
- Josef Rounitch as Ostap, Son of Taras
- Lia Tschung Tsching as Servant
- August Junker
- Rudolf Raab

== Bibliography ==
- Rollberg, Peter. Historical Dictionary of Russian and Soviet Cinema. Scarecrow Press, 2008.
