= Op stap door Amsterdam =

1919 film

- Directed by: Theo Frenkel
- Release date: 3 October 1919
- Country: Netherlands
- Language: Silent

Op stap door Amsterdam is a 1919 Dutch silent film directed by Theo Frenkel.

== Cast ==
- Piet Köhler - Plattelandsman
- Daan Nieuwenhuizen
- Johan Buziau
- Anton Roemer
- Piet Fuchs
- Kees Lageman
- Vera van Haeften
- Bob van Iersel
- Siem Nieuwenhuizen
