= The Devil in Amsterdam =

1919 film

- Directed by: Theo Frenkel
- Written by: Theo Frenkel; Ferenc Molnár
- Release date: 21 March 1919
- Country: Netherlands
- Language: Silent

The Devil in Amsterdam (Dutch: De duivel in Amsterdam) is a 1919 Dutch silent film directed by Theo Frenkel. The film is considered lost.

== Plot ==
The devil travels from hell to Earth to try and make people miserable. He arrives in Amsterdam and notices a poor girl. At first, he plans to shower her with misfortune, but is deterred by her talent, sincerity, and purity. He also spots a wealthy banker who befriends a young painter and supports him financially. The devil devises plans to bring the three together in order to make them miserable. He arranges for the girl to give up her job as a piano teacher to become the governess of the banker's daughter.

At one point, the girl meets the young painter, whom she immediately falls in love with. However, the devil ensures that the painter leaves for Paris to pursue his career, leaving the girl sad and alone. Not long after, the banker's daughter is struck by a car and killed. In Paris, the painter receives a letter from the banker stating that he will marry the governess. The painter becomes jealous and seeks a distraction to keep his feelings of resentment in check. This is not successful. After a year, he returns to Amsterdam, where he has a painful reunion with the girl.

The painter tries to control his anger. The girl is now married to the banker, but cannot control her feelings for the painter. Despite the devil's attempts to create a dramatic love triangle, the three manage to control themselves. Eventually, the painter and the girl run off together. At the end, the devil demands that all three go to hell after their deaths, before he vanishes in a puff of smoke.

== Cast ==
- Eduard Verkade - De Duivel
- Louis Bouwmeester - Van Rijn
- Margie Morris - Thérèse
- Annie Wesling - Huisvriendin van Van Rijn
- Jacques Reule - Schilder
- Mientje Kling - Mizzi
- Lily Bouwmeester - Thérèse's zieke zusje
- Julie Meijer
- Philippe La Chapelle
- Wiesje Bouwmeester
- Ernst Winar
- Piet Urban
- Louis Davids
