= Cirque hollandais =

1924 film by Theo Frenkel

- Directed by: Theo Frenkel
- Written by: Theo Frenkel
- Release date: 17 October 1924
- Running time: 95 minutes
- Country: Netherlands
- Language: Silent

Cirque hollandais is a 1924 Dutch silent film directed by Theo Frenkel.

== Cast ==
- Louis Bouwmeester - circus owner Hendrik van Dalen / cattle farmer Willem van Dalen
- Esther de Boer-van Rijk - Willem van Dalens' wife
- Kitty Kluppell - Willem van Dalens' daughter
- Agnès Marou - Hendriks daughter
- Frits Bouwmeester - Louisot
- Alfred Harvey - Wrestler
- Willem Hunsche
- Johannes Heesters
- Piet Köhler
- Adrienne Solser
- Aaf Bouber
- Piet Fuchs
- Jo Bouwmeester-Kluun
- Rafael Bouwmeester
- Margot Laurentius-Jonas
- Dirk Janse
