= Sophie de Vries-de Boer =

Dutch actress (1882–1944)

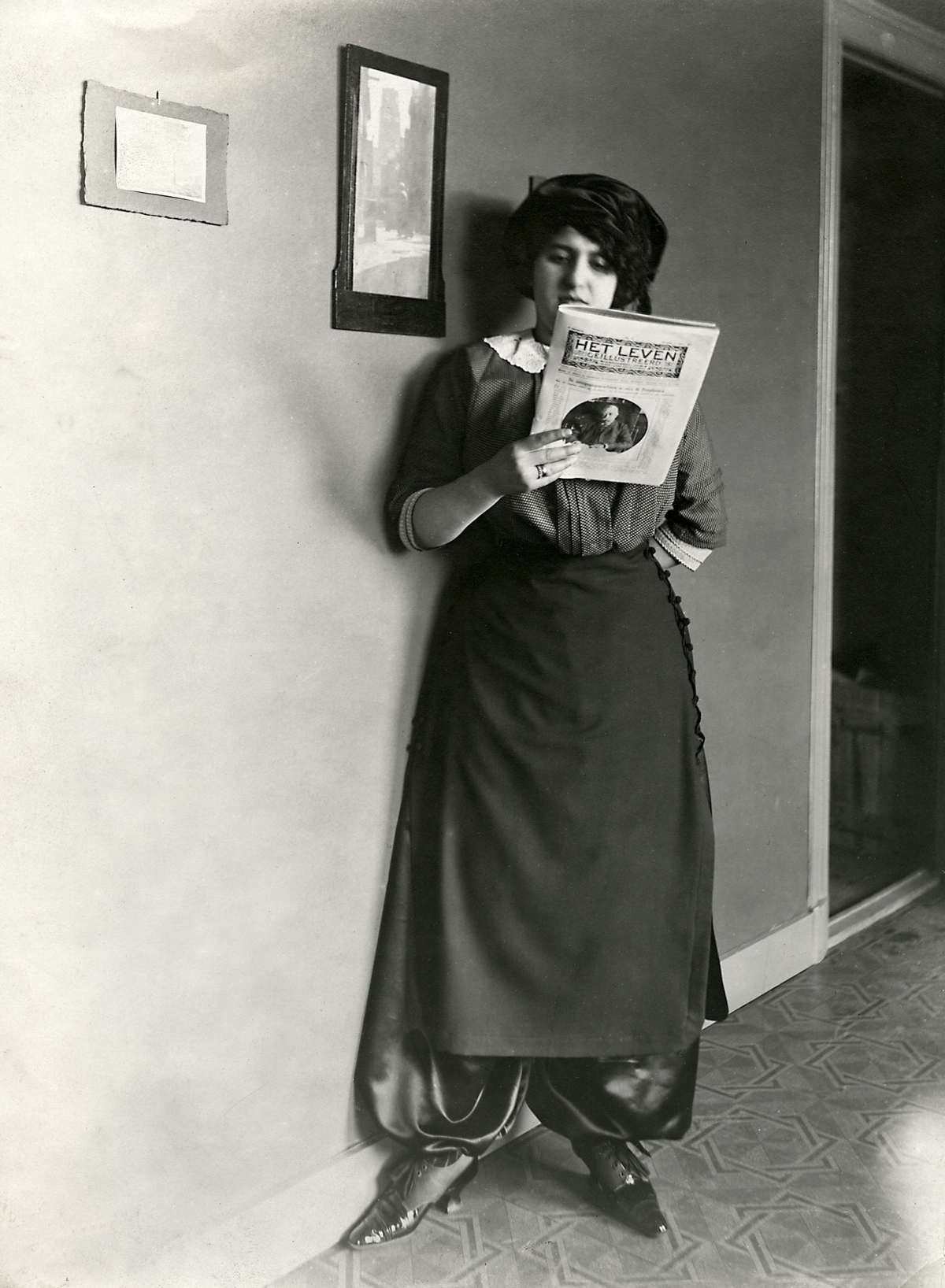
- de Vries-de Boer in 1911
- Born: Sophia Adriana Juliette de Vries-de Boer; 19 June 1882; Rotterdam, Netherlands
- Died: 11 February 1944 (aged 61); Auschwitz concentration camp, German-occupied Poland
- Occupation: Actress
- Years active: 1894–1942

Sophia Adriana Juliette de Vries-de Boer (19 June 1882 – 11 February 1944) was a Dutch actress. She was active in theatre and film between 1894 and 1942. She was murdered in the Auschwitz concentration camp in 1944.

== Selected filmography ==
- Op hoop van zegen (1934)
