= Hamlet (1917 film) =

1917 film by Eleuterio Rodolfi

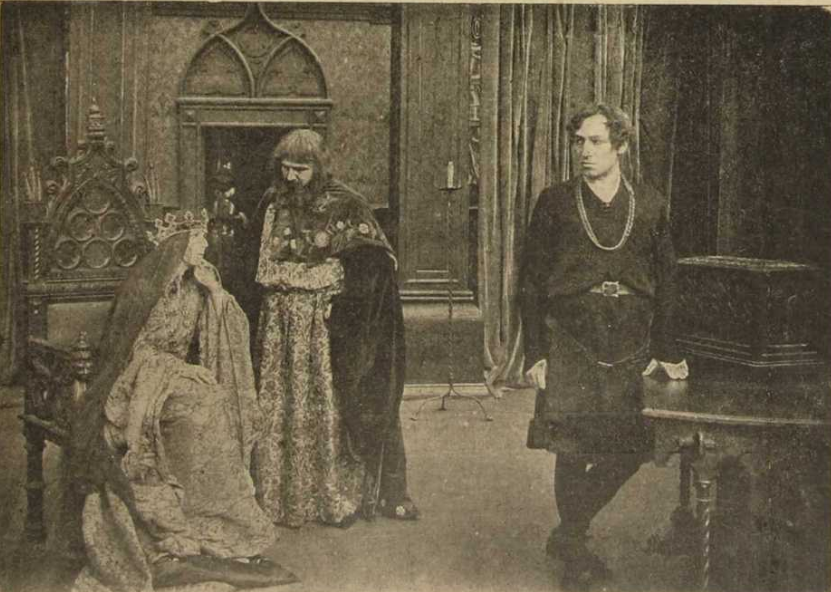
- Directed by: Eleuterio Rodolfi
- Written by: Eleuterio Rodolfi
- Based on: Hamlet; 1599 play by William Shakespeare
- Starring: Ruggero Ruggeri; Helena Makowska; Mercedes Brignone; Martelli
- Cinematography: Luigi Fiorio
- Production companies: Rodolfifilm; Società Italiana Cines
- Distributed by: Società Italiana Cines
- Release date: 1917
- Country: Italy
- Languages: Silent; Italian intertitles

Hamlet (Italian: Amleto) is a 1917 Italian silent drama film directed by Eleuterio Rodolfi and starring Ruggero Ruggeri, Helena Makowska and Mercedes Brignone. It is an adaptation of William Shakespeare's play Hamlet.

== Plot ==
The film is a cinematic adaptation of Hamlet, based on the 1838 translation by Carlo Rusconi.

== Reception ==
Giuseppe Lega in La Cine-fono was harshly critical of the film and the idea of adapting Hamlet. He wrote of it: "It is beyond doubt that Hamlet could never—absolutely never—meet with genuine acclaim on the silver screen... it had no business in the cinema. It is a waste of money and energy. There is a truly oppressive sluggishness and weariness to the scenes. The Shakespearean prince’s tragic inner drama fails to engage or move the audience. Endless intertitles drift by: a book spread out across hundreds of meters of film. Beautiful sets, yet pointless. Beautiful costumes, yet pointless."

== Cast ==
- Ruggero Ruggeri as Hamlet
- Helena Makowska as Ophelia
- Mercedes Brignone as Gertrude
- Martelli as Claudius
- Armand Pouget
- Gerardo Peña

== See also ==
- List of ghost films

== Bibliography ==
- Burnett, Mark Thornton & Streete, Adrian & Wray, Ramona (ed.) The Edinburgh Companion to Shakespeare and the Arts. Edinburgh University Press, 2011.
