= De duivel =

- Directed by: Theo Frenkel
- Written by: Theo Frenkel
- Release date: 4 January 1918
- Country: Netherlands
- Language: Silent

De duivel is a 1918 Dutch silent drama film directed by Theo Frenkel.

== Cast ==
- Tonny Stevens - Henri de Vere
- Charles Mögle - J, Verburg
- Annie Wesling - Henriëtte van Marle
- Frits Bouwmeester
- Cor Smits
- Maurits Parser - Lablache
- Herman Schwab - De heer van Marle
- Lous van Korlaar-van Dam - Mevrouw van Marle
- Toon van Elsen
- Sylvain Poons - Barman in wit uniform
- Anton van Elsen
- Jo Vischer Sr.
- Hendrik Kammemeijer
