= De bruut =

1922 film

- Directed by: Theo Frenkel
- Written by: Paul Reno
- Cinematography: Max Lutze
- Release date: 9 February 1922
- Running time: 108 minutes
- Country: Netherlands
- Language: Silent

De bruut is a 1922 Dutch silent film directed by Theo Frenkel.

== Cast ==
- Willem van der Veer - Charles Duval, de bruut
- Erna Morena - Charles Duvals vrouw
- Bruno Decarli - Henri Norwart
- Adolphe Engers - George Smith
- Coen Hissink - Duvals criminele vriend
- Marianne Stanior - Norwarts jonge zoon
- Marthe Ebinger - Norwarts zieke vrouw
- Gustav Fröhlich
- Theo Frenkel
