= Helleveeg =

1920 film

- Directed by: Theo Frenkel
- Written by: Theo Frenkel
- Release date: 1 October 1920
- Country: Netherlands
- Language: Silent

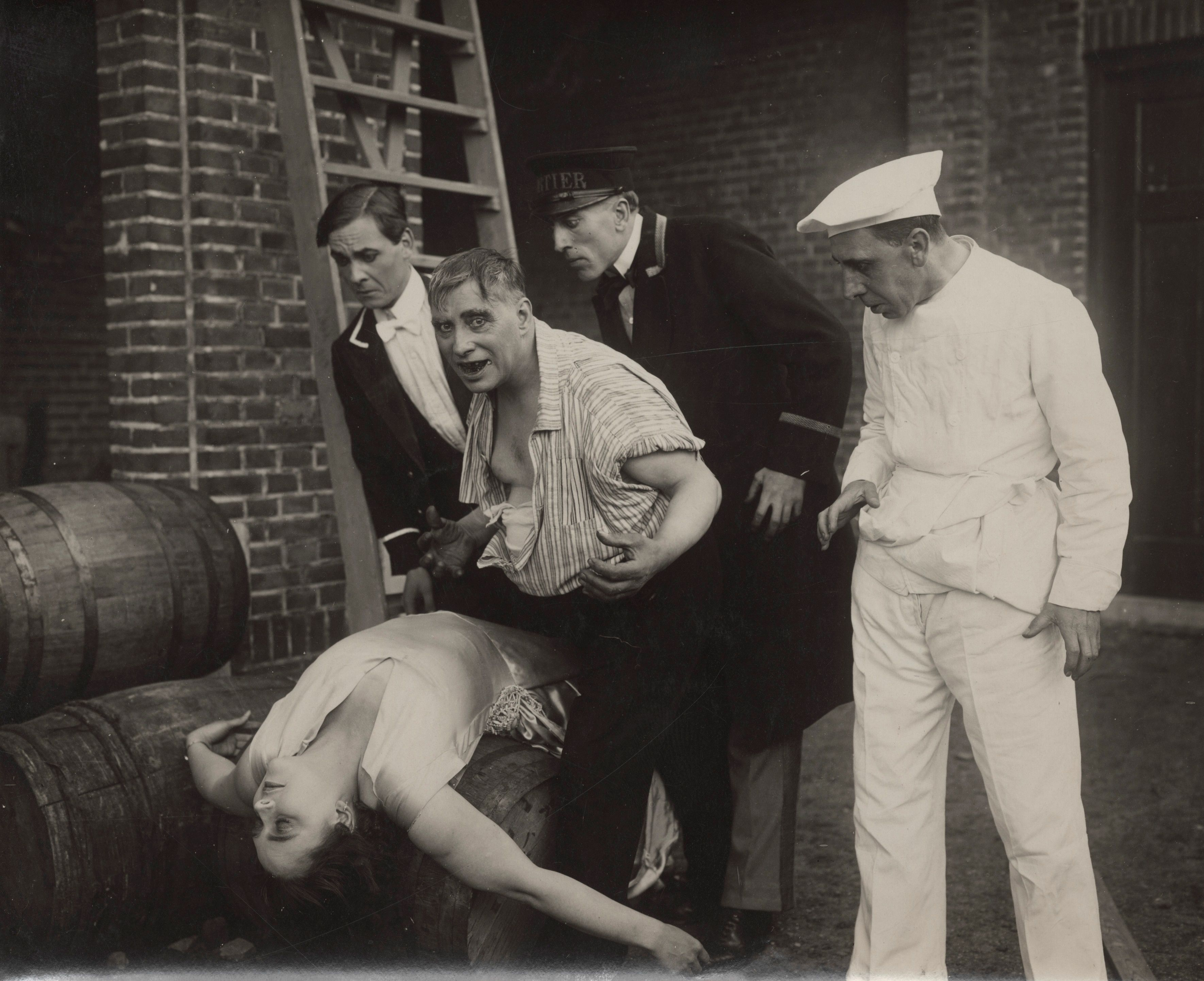
Scene in which Mien Duymaer Van Twist is the fainted woman

Helleveeg is a 1920 Dutch silent film directed by Theo Frenkel.

== Cast ==
- Mien Duymaer Van Twist - Jane, de Helleveeg
- Co Balfoort - Willem Hendriks
- Lily Bouwmeester - Louise
- Frits Fuchs - Willems broer (as Frits Fuchs jr.)
- Herman Schwab - Meneer van Wijck
- Theo Mann-Bouwmeester - Mevrouw Van Wijck
- Joop van Hulzen - Louise's verloofde
- Johan Kaart - Butler van Wijck (as Johan Kaart sr.)
- Mien Braakensiek - Butlers vrouw
- Wilhelmina Schwab-Welman
- Annie Frenkel-Wesling
- Wilhelmina Kleij
- Dio Huysmans
- Nola Hatterman
- Christiaan Laurentius
