= Het proces Begeer =

1918 film

- Directed by: Theo Frenkel
- Written by: Theo Frenkel
- Cinematography: A.P.A. Adriaansz
- Release date: 15 March 1918
- Running time: 58 minutes
- Country: Netherlands
- Language: Silent

Het proces Begeer is a 1918 Dutch silent drama film directed by Theo Frenkel and based on a true story. It follows three criminals who prepare a robbery on the diamond company of the firm Begeer in Amsterdam. It is believed to be a lost film.

== Cast ==
- Jacques Sluyters - Jan Bolkestein
- Coen Hissink - Willem Veltman
- Johannes Langenaken - Henri Klopper
- Chris de la Mar - Jan Hulsman
- Willy Bruns - Marie Bruns
- Annie Wesling - Toos
- Anna Langenaken-Kemper - Jans moeder
- Hendrik Kammemeijer
- Eberhard Erfmann
- Johan Valk
- Sylvain Poons - Volkstype met pet in een danshuis
- Piet Köhler
- Frits Engels
- Willem Kremer
- Willem van der Hout
