= Helena Makowska =

Polish actress (1893–1964)

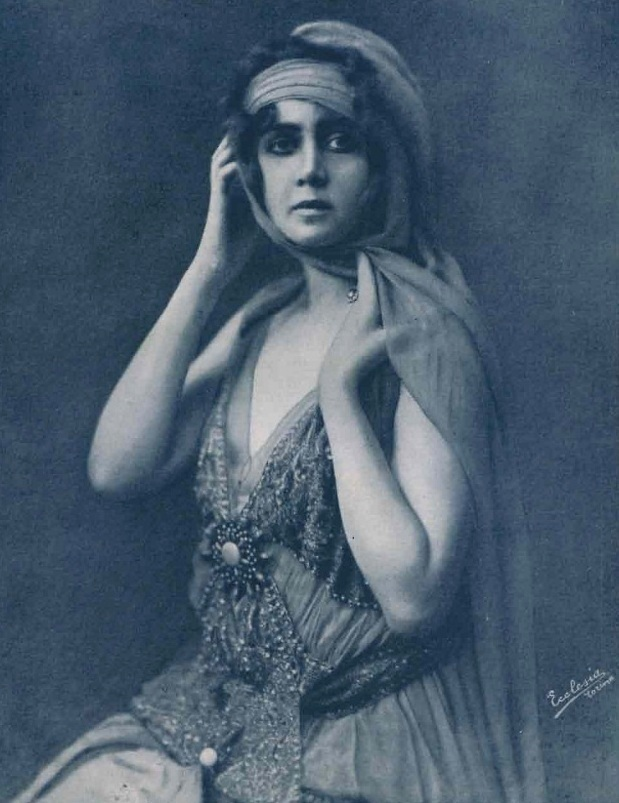
- Born: Helena Woynowiczówna; 2 March 1893; Kryvyi Rih, Russian Empire (present-day Kryvyi Rih, Ukraine)
- Died: 22 August 1964 (aged 71); Rome, Italy
- Resting place: Campo Verano
- Other names: Elena Woyniewicz; Elena Makowska; Helena Woyniewicz
- Occupation: Actress
- Years active: 1911–1958
- Spouse(s): Julian Makowski (m. 1909, divorced) Karl Falkenberg (divorced); Botteril

Helena Makowska (née Woynowiczówna; 2 March 1893 – 22 August 1964) was a Polish actress. She appeared in more than 60 films between 1911 and 1958.

== Early life ==
Helena Makowska was born Helena Woynowiczówna on 2 March 1893 to Ludwik Woyniewicz, a Polish engineer who worked for a Russian-Belgian company, and his wife, Stanisława (née Sauret) in Krivoy Rog in the Russian Empire (today Kryvyi Rih in Ukraine). The family moved to Warsaw in 1903. There, Makowska attended high school and received her first theater roles.

At the age of 16, Makowska married lawyer Julian Makowski, but they divorced shortly after. In 1912, Makowska traveled to Milan, where she took singing lessons. In 1913, she debuted at the Opera as Amelia in Il ballo in maschera and acted as Elena in Mefistofele.

Her film debut was in the 1911 short An Autumn Sunset Dream. She next appeared in the film Romanticismo (1915), which was based on a famous play by Gerolamo Rovetta. Makowska played as Ophelia in Ruggero Ruggeri's Hamlet (1917), and as the seductress Elena in the comedy Goodbye Youth (1918) with Maria Jacobini. Makowska would go on to perform in some 40 Italian films before marrying actor Karl Falkenberg and moving to Munich in the early 1920s.

In the 1920s, she appeared in Dutch and German productions such as Judith (1923), Frauenmoral (1923), both directed by Theo Frenkel, Taras Bulba (1924), and The Shot in the Pavilion (1925) with Margarete Schlegel and Ernst Reicher, as well as Kochanka Szamoty (1927), which was her final Polish film.

In the early 1930s, Makowska married for a third time to Botteril, an Englishman, and returned to Poland, where she worked as an opera singer.

In 1939, when the Wehrmacht invaded Poland, Makowska was arrested as a British citizen and was deported to Berlin in 1940. As part of an exchange of prisoners, she was released in April 1943, whereupon she settled in England. There, she played in the theater ensemble of the Polish army, with whom she later made guest appearances in France, Belgium, and northern Germany.

In 1947, she returned to Rome, where she taught foreign languages and took on small film roles. Makowska's final screen appearance was in Arrivederci Firenze (1958).

Helena Makowska died in Rome on 22 August 1964. She is buried at Campo Verano.

== Selected filmography ==
- Hamlet (1917)
- Goodbye Youth (1918)
- The Prince of the Impossible (1918)
- Circus People (1922)
- A Dying Nation (1922)
- Maciste and the Silver King's Daughter (1922)
- Judith (1923)
- Frauenmoral (1923)
- Love of Life (1924)
- Taras Bulba (1924)
- Modern Marriages (1924)
- The Four Last Seconds of Quidam Uhl (1924)
- The Terror of the Sea (1924)
- The Shot in the Pavilion (1925)
- The Secret of One Hour (1925)
