= Matthieu van Eysden =

Dutch actor (1896–1970)

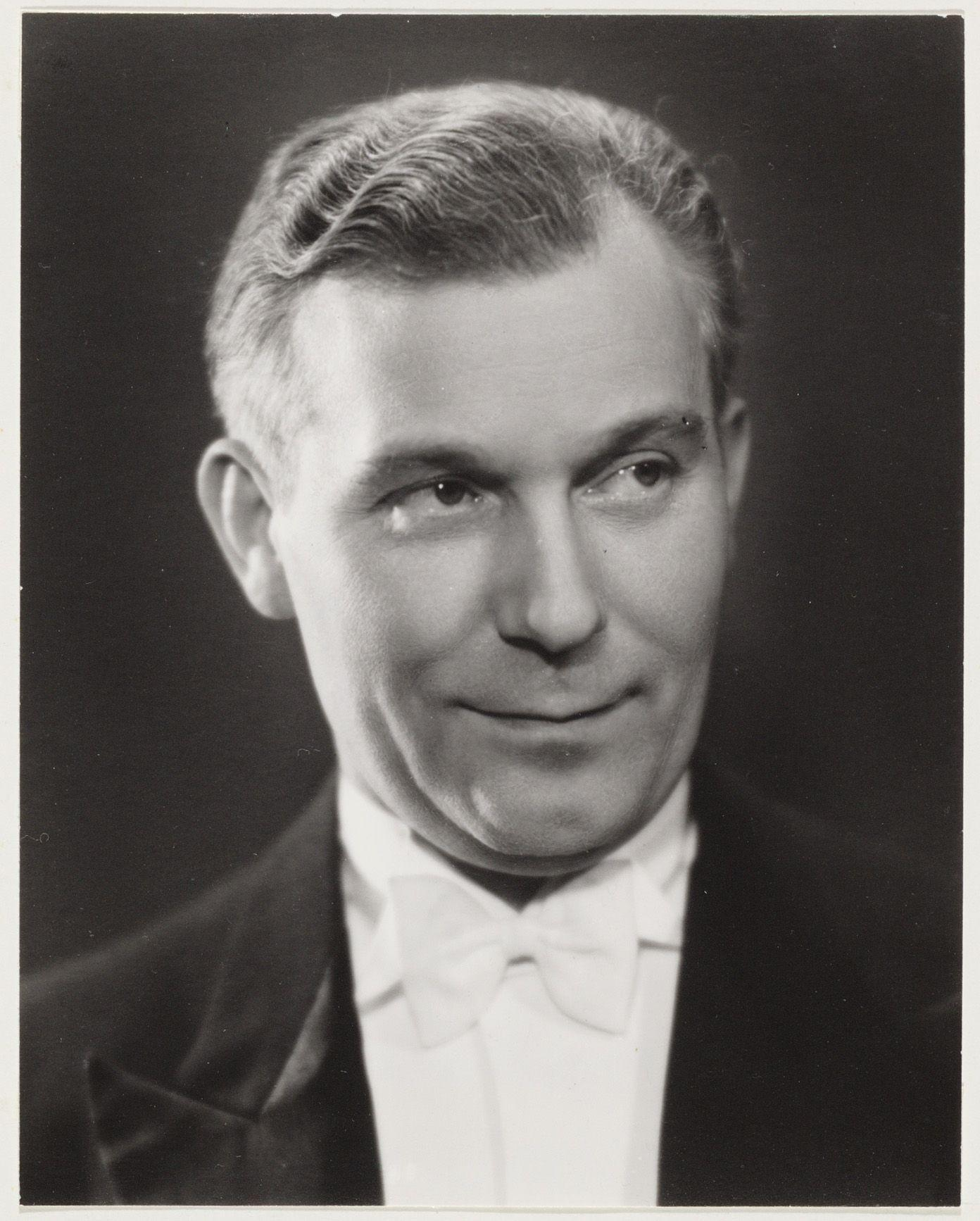
- Van Eijsden (1937)
- Born: April 26, 1896; Amersfoort, Netherlands
- Died: November 8, 1970 (aged 74); Haarlem, Netherlands
- Occupations: Film Actor; Television Actor

Mattheus Marinus "Matthieu" van Eijsden (Note: His name was often spelled Van Eysden) (26 April 1896, in Amersfoort – 8 November 1970, in Haarlem) was a Dutch film and television actor.

== Filmography ==
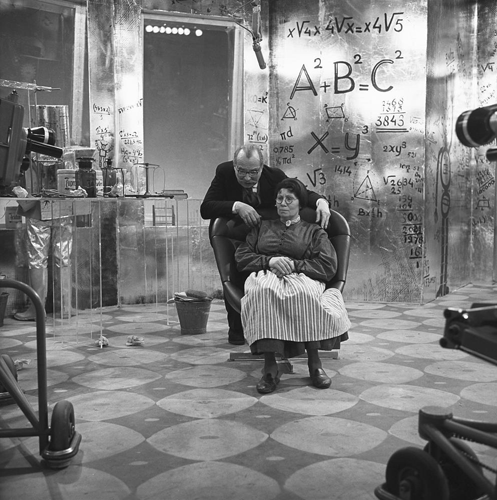
Matthieu van Eysden and Riek Schagen in the television series Vrouwtje Bezemsteel (1967)

- The Bluejackets (1922)
- Artistenrevue (1926)
- Het Meisje met den Blauwen Hoed (1934)
- Op Hoop van Zegen (1934)
- The Trouble With Money (1936)
- Kermisgasten (1936)
- Merijntje Gijzen's Jeugd (1936)
- Pygmalion (1937)
- Forty Years (1938)
- De Big van het Regiment (1939)
- Ergens in Nederland (1940)
- Drie Weken Huisknecht (1944)
- But Not in Vain (1948)
- A Dog of Flanders (1959)

== Bibliography ==
- Mathijs, Ernest. The Cinema of the Low Countries. Wallflower Press, 2004.
