= Ergens in Nederland =

1940 film by Ludwig Berger

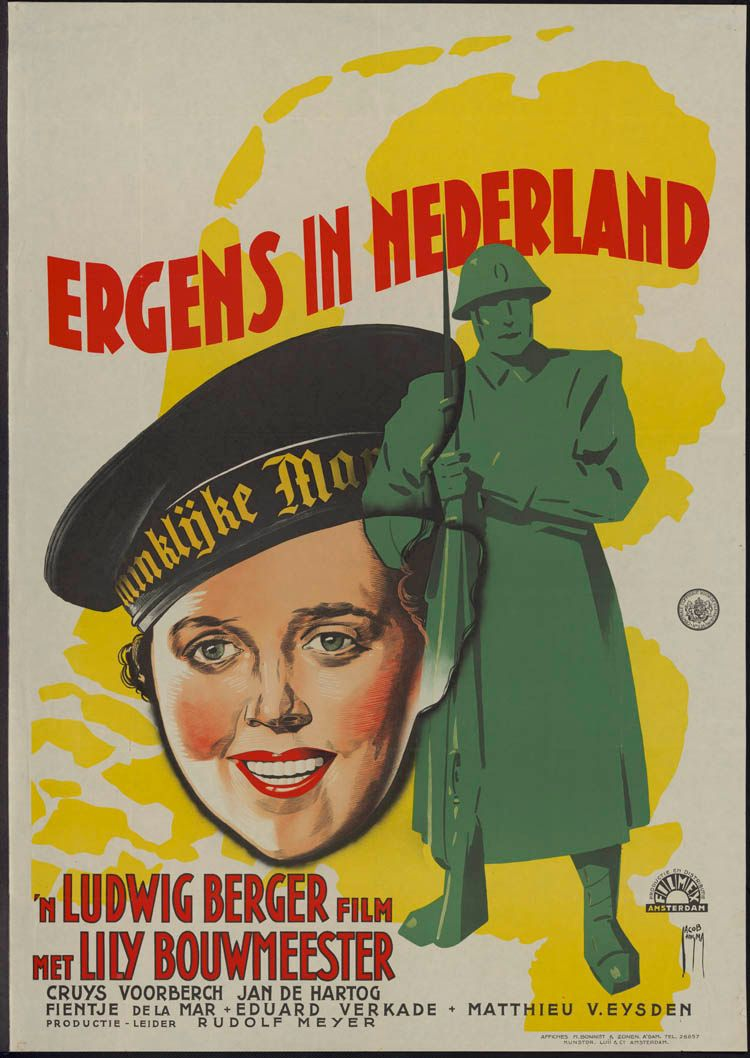
- Directed by: Ludwig Berger
- Written by: Ludwig Berger, Jan de Hartog
- Produced by: Rudolf Meyer
- Cinematography: Akos Farkas
- Edited by: Jan Teunissen
- Music by: Max Tak
- Release date: 12 April 1940
- Running time: 109 minutes
- Country: Netherlands
- Language: Dutch

Ergens in Nederland (internationally known as Somewhere in the Netherlands) is a 1940 Dutch film directed by Ludwig Berger with the support of the Royal Dutch Navy.

== Cast ==
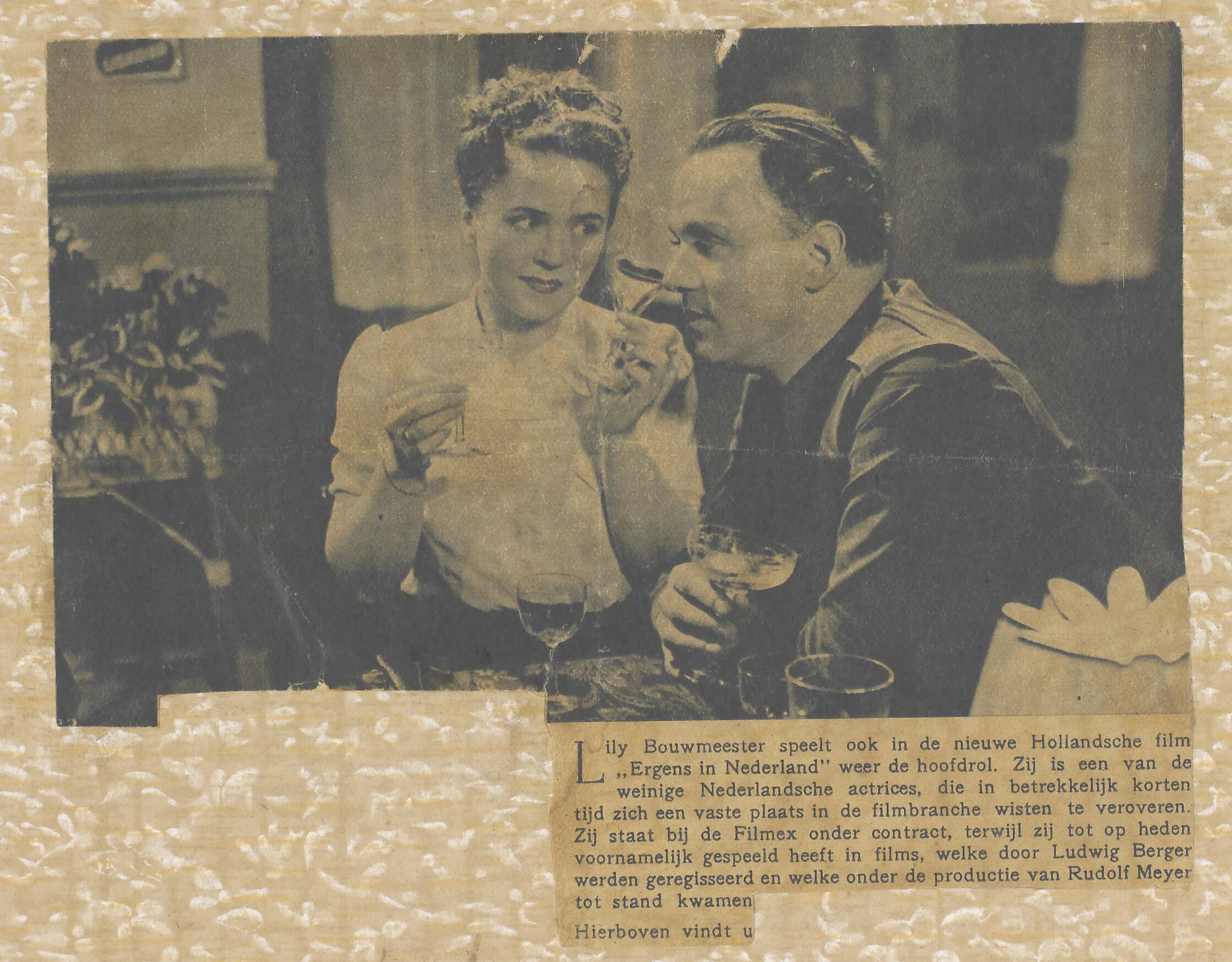
Bouwmeester and Voorbergh in a cutout made by Anne Frank

- Lily Bouwmeester as Nellie van Loon
- Jan de Hartog as lawyer Frans van Loon, Nellie's husband
- Fien de la Mar as a society lady
- Cruys Voorbergh as the actor Erik Detmar
- Matthieu van Eysden as Beyer, the driver
- Max Croiset
- Rini Otte
- Eduard Verkade as an old music teacher
- Piet Köhler
- Aaf Bouber (as Aaf Bouber-ten Hoope) as the Zeelandic farmer
- Chris Baay
- Harry Boda
