= Genie tegen geweld =

1916 film

- Directed by: Theo Frenkel
- Written by: Theo Frenkel
- Cinematography: A. P. A. Adriaansz
- Release date: 28 April 1916
- Running time: 70 minutes
- Country: Netherlands
- Language: Silent

Genie tegen geweld is a 1916 Dutch silent film directed by Theo Frenkel.

== Cast ==
- Adelqui Migliar – Pim Bruce
- Mary Beekman – Vrouw van de huisvriend / Wife of the family friend
- Aaf Bouber – (as Aaf Bouber-ten Hoope)
- Jan Cijsch – Huisvriend / Family friend
- Piet Fuchs – Dierentemmer / Animal tamer
- Henni Hillebrand – Jack
- Herman Hulsman – Diamanthandelaar / Diamonddealer
- Manus Hulsman
- Hendrik Kammemeijer – Agent / Policeman
- Jan Lemaire Sr. – Kantoorbediende / Clerk
- Hetty Ruijs – Vrouw van de diamanthandelaar / Wife of the diamonddealer
- Jacques Sequeira – Diamanthandelaar / Diamonddealer
- Jacques van Hoven – Kantoorbediende / Clerk
