= Pro domo =

1918 film

- Directed by: Theo Frenkel
- Written by: Theo Frenkel; A.W.G. van Riemsdijk
- Release date: 21 September 1918
- Running time: 104 minutes
- Country: Netherlands
- Language: Silent

Pro domo is a 1918 Dutch silent drama film directed by Theo Frenkel.

== Cast ==
- Louis Bouwmeester - Graaf Louis de Prébois Grancé
- Theo Mann-Bouwmeester - Graaf Louis de Prébois Grancé's wife
- Henriette Blazer - Danseres
- Lily Bouwmeester - Hun daughter
- Julius Brongers - Tuinman
- Jan Grader - Politieagent
- Coen Hissink - Jachtopziener
- Rika Hopper - Zuster Thérèse
- Julie Meijer - (as Julie Frenkel-Meyer)
- Bertus Onstee - Priester
- John Timrott - Henri de Beaucourt
- Annie Wesling - Gouvernante
- Ernst Winar - Prins
