= Love and Thieves =

1928 film

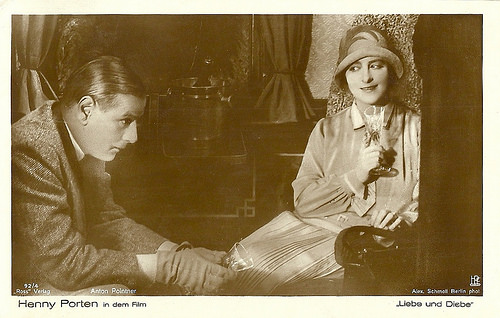
- Anton Pointner and Henny Porten
- Directed by: Carl Froelich
- Written by: Fred Sauer; Walter Wassermann
- Produced by: Carl Froelich; Henny Porten; Wilhelm von Kaufmann
- Starring: Henny Porten; Anton Pointner; Adolphe Engers
- Cinematography: Gustave Preiss
- Music by: Artur Guttmann
- Production company: Henny Porten-Froelich-Produktion
- Distributed by: Parufamet
- Release date: 8 March 1928
- Country: Germany
- Languages: Silent; German intertitles

Love and Thieves (German: Liebe und Diebe) is a 1928 German silent drama film directed by Carl Froelich and Henny Porten, Anton Pointner and Adolphe Engers. The film's art direction was by Franz Schroedter. It premiered at the Ufa-Palast am Zoo and was distributed by UFA as part of the Parufamet agreement.

== Cast ==
- Henny Porten as Anna von Belling
- Anton Pointner as Gerd von Langen, Kriminalkommissar
- Adolphe Engers as Mertens, Kriminalassistent
- Paul Bildt as Smirnoff, Staatsrat a.D.
- Kurt Gerron as Hüsgens, Fabrikant
- Michael Mar as Der Hoteldirektor
- Max Ralph-Ostermann as Der Polizeichef
- Carl Geppert as 1. Ehemann
- Oreste Bilancia as 2. Ehemann
- Hubert von Meyerinck as 3. Ehemann
- Ellen Kürti

== Bibliography ==
- Grange, William. Cultural Chronicle of the Weimar Republic. Scarecrow Press, 2008.
