= Op Hoop van Zegen (1934 film) =

1934 film by Louis Saalborn and Alex Benno

Op hoop van zegen
- Directed by: Alex Benno
- Written by: Herman Heijermans (play) & Alex Benno (screenplay)
- Release date: 21 December 1934
- Running time: 105 minutes
- Country: Netherlands
- Language: Dutch

Esther de Boer-van Rijk and Annie Verhulst in ‘’Op Hoop van Zegen’’

Op hoop van zegen is a 1934 Dutch drama film directed by Alex Benno after the 1900 play by the same name by Herman Heijermans.

== Cast ==
- Esther de Boer-van Rijk - Kniertje
- Philip Dorn - Geert, haar zoon (as Frits van Dongen)
- Jan Van Ees - Barend, haar zoon
- Annie Verhulst - Jo, haar nicht
- Willem van der Veer - Reder Bos
- Sophie de Vries-de Boer - Reder Bos zijn vrouw (as Sophie d.Vries-d.Boer v. Rijk)
- Miep van den Berg - Clementine, z'n dochter
- Coen Hissink - Kaps, boekhouder
- Willem Hunsche - Simon, scheepstimmerman
- Cissy Van Bennekom - Marietje, z'n dochter (as Ciccy v. Bennekom)
- August Kiehl - Daantje
- Anton Verheyen - Kobus
- Aaf Bouber - Truus, een buurvrouw
- Matthieu van Eysden - Sergeant mariniers (as Matthieu v. Eijsden)
