= Aaf Bouber =

Dutch actress

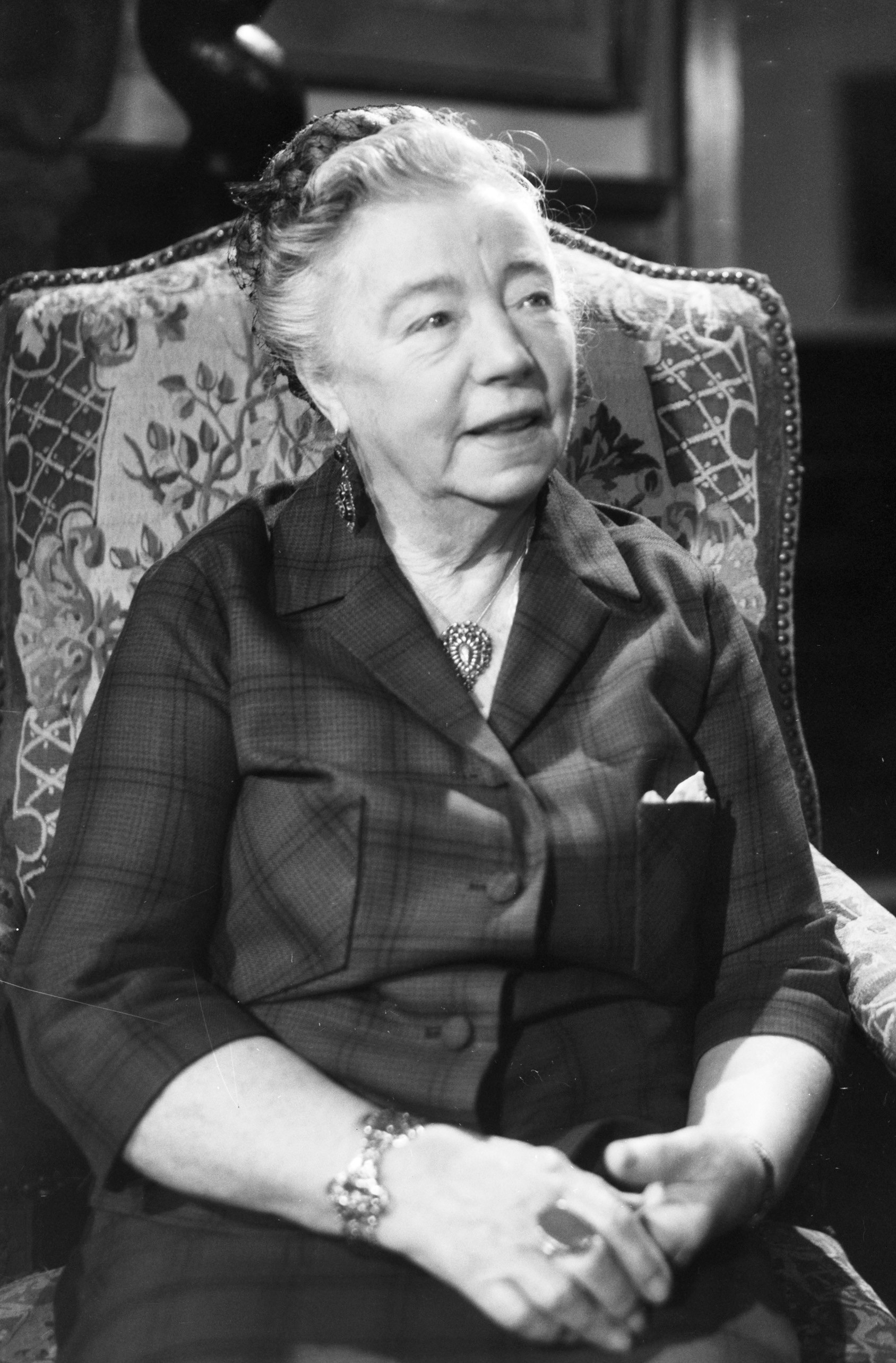
- Aaf Bouber in 1965
- Born: 17 October 1885; Hoorn, Amsterdam
- Died: 23 May 1974 (aged 88); Amsterdam, Netherlands
- Occupation: Actor
- Years active: 1915–1942

Aaf Bouber (17 October 1885 – 23 May 1974) was a Dutch stage, film and television actress. She was born Aafje ten Hoope and married the stage actor Herman Bouber in 1907.

== Selected filmography ==
- Fatum (1915)
- The Wreck in the North Sea (1915)
- Genie tegen geweld (1916)
- Cirque hollandais (1924)
- Oranje Hein (1925)
- Op Hoop van Zegen (1934)
- Ergens in Nederland (1940)
- De Laatste Dagen van een Eiland (1942)
