= Geeft ons kracht =

1920 film

- Directed by: Theo Frenkel
- Written by: Theo Frenkel; Koos Speenhoff
- Produced by: Theo Frenkel
- Release date: 1 October 1920
- Country: Netherlands
- Language: Silent

Geeft ons kracht is a 1920 Dutch silent film directed by Theo Frenkel.

== Cast ==
- Co Balfoort
- Esther de Boer-van Rijk
- Vera van Haeften
- Nola Hatterman
- Joop van Hulzen
- Dio Huysmans
- Wilhelmina Schwab-Welman
