= Vijftig jaren =

- Directed by: Ernst Winar
- Release date: August 13, 1948
- Country: Netherlands
- Language: Dutch

Vijftig jaren is a 1948 Dutch film directed by Ernst Winar.

== Cast ==
- Theo Frenkel
- Bierman Harrie
- Mara Josso
- Minny van Ollefen
- Jules Verstraete
