= Zeven jongens en een oude schuit =

- Directed by: G. Gerritsen
- Written by: A.C.C. de Vletter (book)
- Release date: 17 July 1942
- Running time: 98 minutes
- Country: Netherlands
- Language: Dutch

Zeven jongens en een oude schuit is a 1942 Dutch adventure film directed by G. Gerritsen, based on the eponymous novel by A.C.C. de Vletter.

== Cast ==
- Frans Beukenkamp ... Toon
- L. van Dijk ... Kapitein Trappers
