= De Laatste Dagen van een Eiland =

1942 film

- Directed by: Ernst Winar
- Written by: Karel Norel (novel), Ernst Winar (scenario)
- Release date: 11 September 1942
- Running time: 80 minutes
- Country: Netherlands
- Language: Dutch

De Laatste Dagen van een Eiland is a 1942 Dutch film directed by Ernst Winar.

== Cast ==
- Max Croiset
- Jules Verstraete
- Aaf Bouber
- Jeanne Verstraete
- Coen Hissink
- Daan Van Olleffen
- Marie Faassen
- Hedwig Flemming
