= Adolphe Engers =

Dutch writer and actor (1884–1945)

- Born: 20 June 1884; Gulpen, Netherlands
- Died: 8 December 1945 (aged 61); The Hague, Netherlands
- Occupation: Actor
- Years active: 1918 - 1939 (film)

Adolphe Engers (1884–1945) was a Dutch writer and actor on stage and in the movies, who appeared in more than fifty films during his career, a number of them in Weimar Germany.

== Biography ==
Before his career in film, he was an actor on the stage and a writer. In 1920, he published Peccavi...???, a then-scandalous novel with a gay protagonist, co-written with fellow actor Ernst Winar. A performer of considerable talent, he was to be honored for his achievements on the stage in the 1930s by an honorary committee that included Simon Carmiggelt, who related that, when the committee members understood that Engers himself was gay, withdrew from the committee one after the other.

Other works were a screenplay about the closing of the Zuiderzee, which created the artificial lake IJsselmeer, in which he was to act as well (only promotional footage for the project seems to remain), and a play about Oscar Wilde, published in 1917, whose main themes are norms and deviancy; "deviancy" in Engers' play includes art and beauty, which are crushed by the normality of everyday society.

He appeared in the 1922 German-Dutch co-production The Man in the Background.

== Selected filmography ==
- Madeleine (1919)
- Roswolsky's Mistress (1921)
- The Love Corridor (1921)
- Lumpaci the Vagabond (1922)
- The Man in the Background (1922)
- King of Women (1923)
- Daisy (1923)
- The Journey to Happiness (1923)
- The Grand Duke's Finances (1924)
- By Order of Pompadour (1924)
- The Man at Midnight (1924)
- The Evangelist (1924)
- The Doll of Luna Park (1925)
- The Morals of the Alley (1925)
- Nick, King of the Chauffeurs (1925)
- The Elegant Bunch (1925)
- The Marriage Swindler (1925)
- The Prince and the Dancer (1926)
- Mademoiselle Josette, My Woman (1926)
- The Wooing of Eve (1926)
- A Girl of the People (1927)
- The Prince's Child (1927)
- Carnival Magic (1927)
- When the Young Wine Blossoms (1927)
- The False Prince (1927)
- Serenissimus and the Last Virgin (1928)
- Vienna, City of My Dreams (1928)
- Love and Thieves (1928)
- He Goes Right, She Goes Left! (1928)
- Guilty (1928)
- Don Juan in a Girls' School (1928)
- The Fourth from the Right (1929)
- Sinful and Sweet (1929)
- Terra Nova (1932)
- Forty Years (1938)
- De Spooktrein (1939)

== Bibliography ==
- Andriopoulos, Stefan. Possessed: Hypnotic Crimes, Corporate Fiction, and the Invention of Cinema. University of Chicago Press, 2008.
