= Bijna een dubbele moord in Lutjebroek =

1920 film

- Directed by: Harry Waghalter
- Release date: 1920
- Country: Netherlands
- Language: Silent

Bijna een dubbele moord in Lutjebroek is a 1920 short Dutch silent film directed by Harry Waghalter.

== Cast ==
- Frensky - Augurkie
- Henri le Dent - Worteltje
- Harry Waghalter
- Ruth Arden
- Jan Grootveld
