= De cabaret-prinses =

1925 film

- Directed by: Theo Frenkel
- Written by: Theo Frenkel
- Release date: 13 March 1925
- Country: Netherlands
- Language: Silent

De cabaret-prinses is a 1925 Dutch silent film directed by Theo Frenkel.

== Cast ==
- Emmy Arbous - La Manuela, de cabaret-prinses
- August Van den Hoeck - Schipper
- Esther de Boer-van Rijk - Schippersvrouw
- Co Balfoort - Willem
- André van Dijk - Hendrik
- Agnès Marou - Jeanne
- Rika de la Mar Kleij - Koopvrouw
- Jacques Van Bijlevelt - Impresario
- Louis van Gasteren Sr. - Intrigant
- Coen Hissink - Paria
- Hans Bruening - Dominee
