= Blood Money (1921 film) =

1921 British-Dutch film by Fred Goodwins

- Directed by: Fred Goodwins
- Written by: Cecil Bullivant
- Production company: Anglo-Hollandia
- Release date: 22 February 1921
- Countries: United Kingdom; Netherlands
- Language: Silent

Blood Money (Dutch: Bloedgeld) is a 1921 British-Dutch silent crime film directed by Fred Goodwins. The film is also known as The Harper's Mystery.

== Cast ==
- Adelqui Migliar as Victor Legrand
- Dorothy Fane as Felice Deschanel
- Frank Dane as Sarne
- Arthur M. Cullin as Matthew Harper
- Colette Brettel as Marguerite Deschanel
- Harry Ham as Inspector Bell
- Fred Goodwins as Bruce Harper
- Harry Waghalter as Mark Harper
- Coen Hissink as Matthews bediende
- Peggy Linden
