= Bet, Queen of Jordan =

1924 film

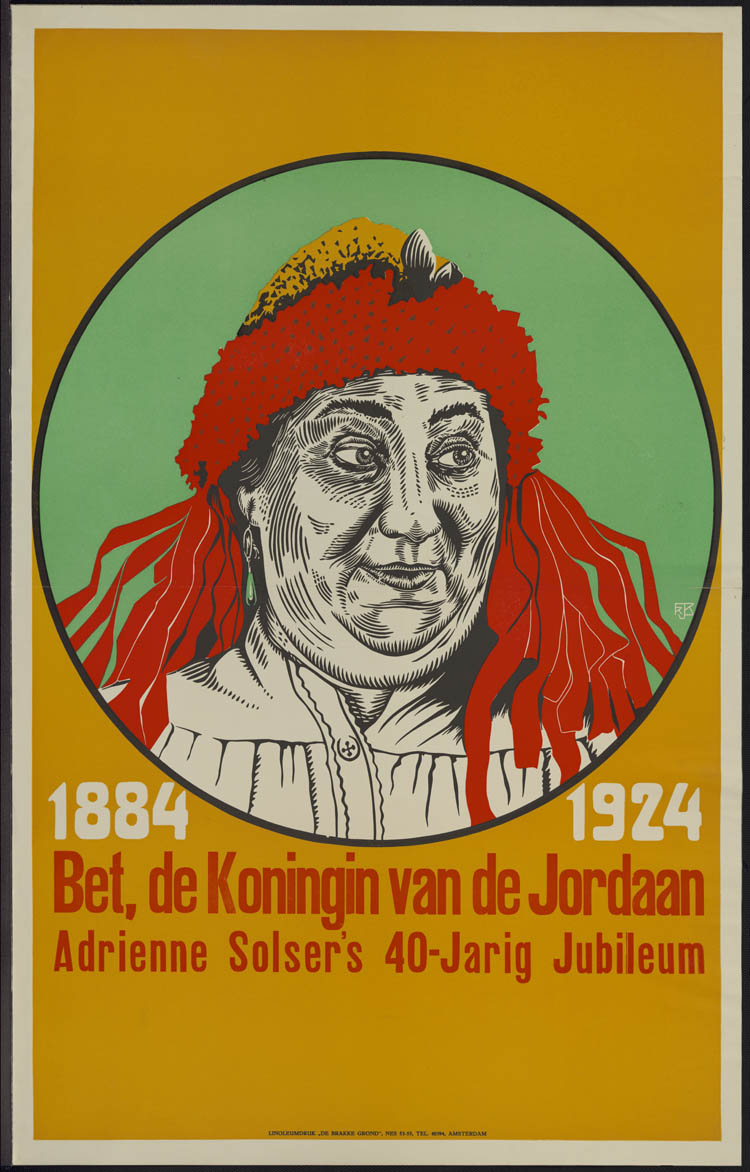
- Directed by: Adriënne Solser, Pierre Hulsman
- Written by: Alfred Harvey
- Produced by: André Boesnach, Jules Suikerman
- Distributed by: Hollando-Belgica Film Mij. Eureka
- Release date: 21 November 1924
- Running time: 75 minutes
- Country: Netherlands
- Language: Silent

Bet, Queen of Jordan (Dutch: Bet de koningin van de Jordaan) is a 1924 Dutch silent film directed by Adriënne Solser and Pierre Hulsman. It was the first of four films featuring Solser as Bet.

== Cast ==
- Adriënne Solser - Bet Strik
- Jan Nooy - Hein Strik
- Beppie Nooy Sr. - Trui Bles / De Weduwe
