= The Man in the Background =

1922 film

- Directed by: Ernst Winar
- Written by: Eduard Ijdo; Heinz Salmon
- Cinematography: Joe Rive
- Edited by: Ernst Winar
- Release date: 8 September 1922
- Countries: Netherlands; Weimar Republic
- Language: Silent

The Man in the Background (German: Der Mann im Hintergrund, Dutch:De man op den achtergrond) is a 1922 Dutch-German silent film directed by Ernst Winar.

== Cast ==
- Eduard Ijdo – Geoffrey Gill
- Adolphe Engers – Willem Hendriks
- Paula de Waart – Willem Hendriks' vrouw
- Koba Kinsbergen – Mariska
- Ernst Becker – Lord Ruthven
- Herma van Delden – Mauds zus
- Coen Hissink – Count Stanislaus Larinski
- Hans Lindegg – Werner
- Paul Rehkopf
- Erich Walter – Count Otto von Trepow
- Stefanie Hantzsch – Agnes von Trepow
- Victor Colani – Bernhard von Trepow
- Eduard van Meghen – Von Harder
- Fritz Epstein – Peter
- Erika Unruh – Käthe
