= The Black Tulip (1921 film) =

1921 film

- Directed by: Maurits Binger; Frank Richardson
- Written by: Alexandre Dumas
- Release date: 19 August 1921
- Running time: 72 minutes
- Country: Netherlands
- Language: Silent

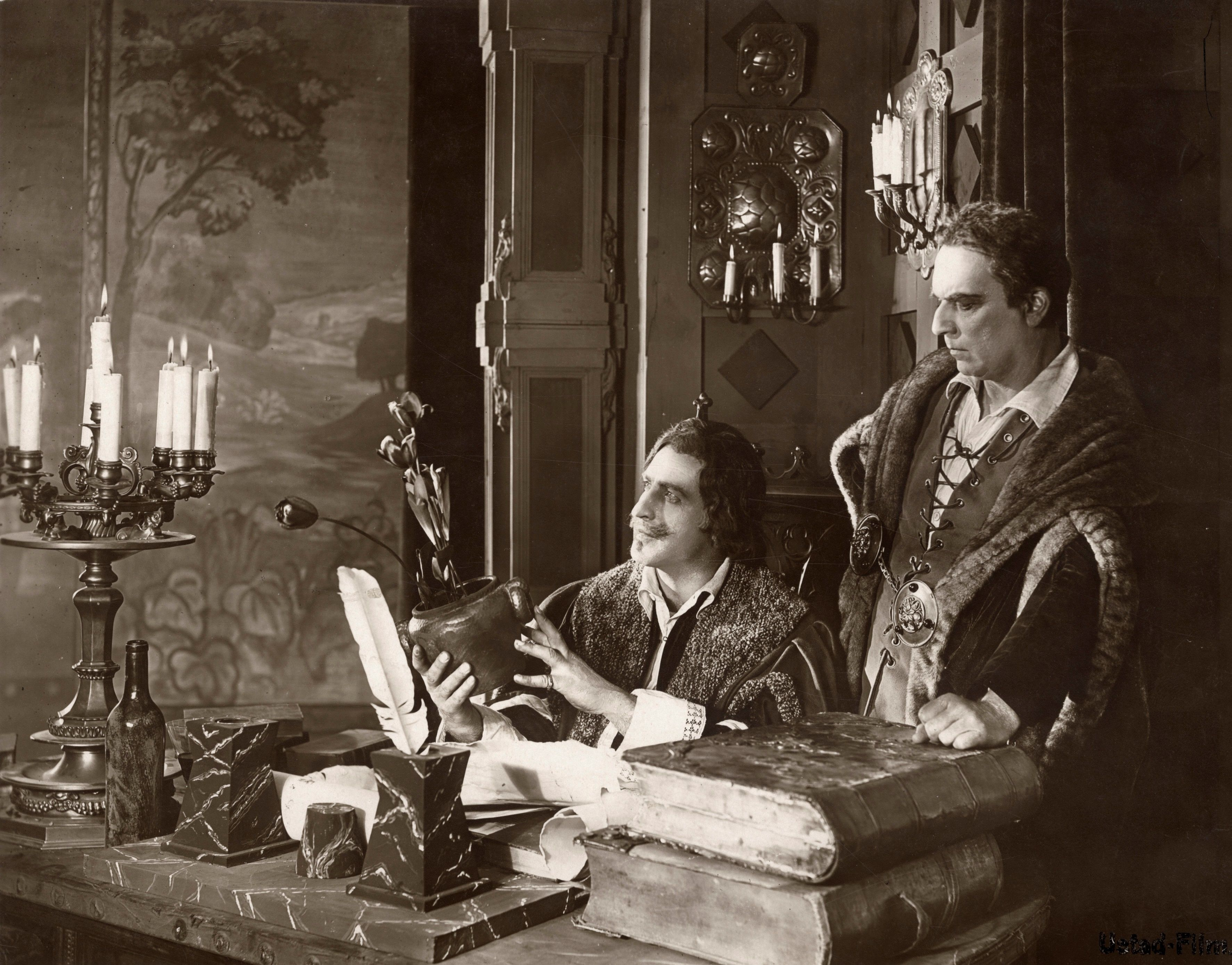
Eduard Verkade and Dio Huysmans as the de Witt Brothers

The Black Tulip (Dutch: De zwarte tulp) is a 1921 Dutch silent adventure film directed by Maurits Binger. It is based on the novel The Black Tulip by Alexandre Dumas.

== Plot ==
In 17th-century Haarlem, a tulip contest is announced: whoever can grow the first black tulip will receive 100,000 guilders as a reward. Cornelis van Baerle seems to be on the verge of success, but many rival growers try to thwart his efforts. Due to political turmoil, Cornelis ends up in prison. The tulip captivates all of Holland; we also witness the downfall of the De Witt brothers. Ultimately, the Prince of Orange decides that Cornelis must be released; he grows the tulip, wins his prize, and marries Rosa, the jailor's daughter.

== Cast ==
- Gerald McCarthy - Cornelis van Baerle
- Zoe Palmer - Rosa, daughter of the jailer
- Eduard Verkade - Cornelis de Witt
- Dio Huysmans - Johan de Witt
- Coen Hissink - Jailer / Gryphus
- Harry Waghalter - Isaac Boxtel
- August Van den Hoeck - Tichelaer, the barber from Piershil
- Frank Dane - Prins van Oranje
- Lau Ezerman - Willem
- Wilhelmina van den Hoeck - Wife of Cornelis de Witt
- Josephine Homann-Niehorster
- Carl Tobi
- Fred Homann
- Betty Doxat-Pratt
