= Judith (1923 film) =

1923 film

- Directed by: Theo Frenkel
- Written by: Lothar Knud Frederik
- Cinematography: Georg Muschner
- Release date: 5 June 1923
- Running time: 96 minutes
- Country: Netherlands
- Language: Silent

Judith is a 1923 Dutch silent film directed by Theo Frenkel.

== Cast ==
- Helena Makowska - Gravin Judith
- E. Paul - Graaf Robert de Bertan
- Adolf Klein - Markies Emile de Fers
- Claire Rommer - Louise
- Ernst Rückert - Baron Gaston de Noel
- Heinz Salfner - Charles Delcourt
- Theo Mann-Bouwmeester - Charles Delcourts moeder
- Olga Limburg - Olga Tatschowa
- Oscar Marion - Dr. George Delcourt
- Julie Meijer - (as Julie Frenkel)
