= Liefdesintriges =

1920 film

Liefdesintriges is a 1920 Dutch silent film. It was produced by Nationale Filmfabriek Bloemendaal. It features two men attempting to woo a woman and one getting jealous and punching the other man.
