= Drie Weken Huisknecht =

- Directed by: Walter Smith
- Written by: Henk Bakker (play) Walter Smith (writer)
- Based on: Adel in Livrei
- Music by: Cor Steyn
- Production company: Filmfabriek Polygoon Profilti
- Release date: 17 March 1944
- Running time: 102 minutes
- Country: Netherlands
- Language: Dutch

Drie Weken Huisknecht (transl. Butler for Three Weeks) is a Dutch film directed by Walter Smith. It was filmed in 1942 and released in 1944. It is based on the play Adel in Livrei (lit. 'Nobility in Livery') by Henk Bakker. It was the only large Dutch feature film produced during the Second World War.

== Cast ==
The cast consisted of:

- Paul Steenbergen as Alfred de Beaucour
- Matthieu van Eysden as Marcel (butler)
- Joan Remmelts as Henri de Beaucour
- Piet Bron as Gerrit Bolhuis
- Coba Kelling as Julia Bolhuis
- Wilma van Klaveren as Loes Bolhuis
- Richard Flink as Van Bunschoten
- Louise Hiddink as Nelly
- Jo Vischer Sr. as Van den Burg
- Jan Blok as Slager Wolters
- Piet te Nuyl Sr. as Wijnhandelaar Winpelman
- Henk Bakker as Peitzel

== Production ==
The film is based on the play Adel in Livrei (lit. 'Nobility in Livery') by Henk Bakker, which premiered before the Second World War.

In early 1942, the film companies Filmfabriek Polygoon and Profilti together acquired the rights to the play. The working title for the film was Kasteel te koop (transl. Castle for sale). The production of the film was primarily intended to keep the actors and technicians occupied.

During the occupation of the Netherlands, Dutch film companies were only allowed to produce small films that would be shown as a pre-film before a long German film. The Germans wanted to prevent manifestations of national character in longer Dutch movies. In May 1942, the companies inquired whether the leader of the film guild Kultuurkamer and leader of the Rijksfilmkeuring (State Film Censorship), Jan Teunissen, would approve the movie. Teunissen then sought approval from the Germans. The Germans at first advised negatively, considering it 'ausgesprochener Kitsch' (transl. 'utterly kitsch') and 'Ablehnen: zu schwach' (transl. 'reject: too weak'), but apparently later gave permission. Unlike its predecessors, the movie was made without any Jewish-Dutch participation (in contemporary press "foreign").

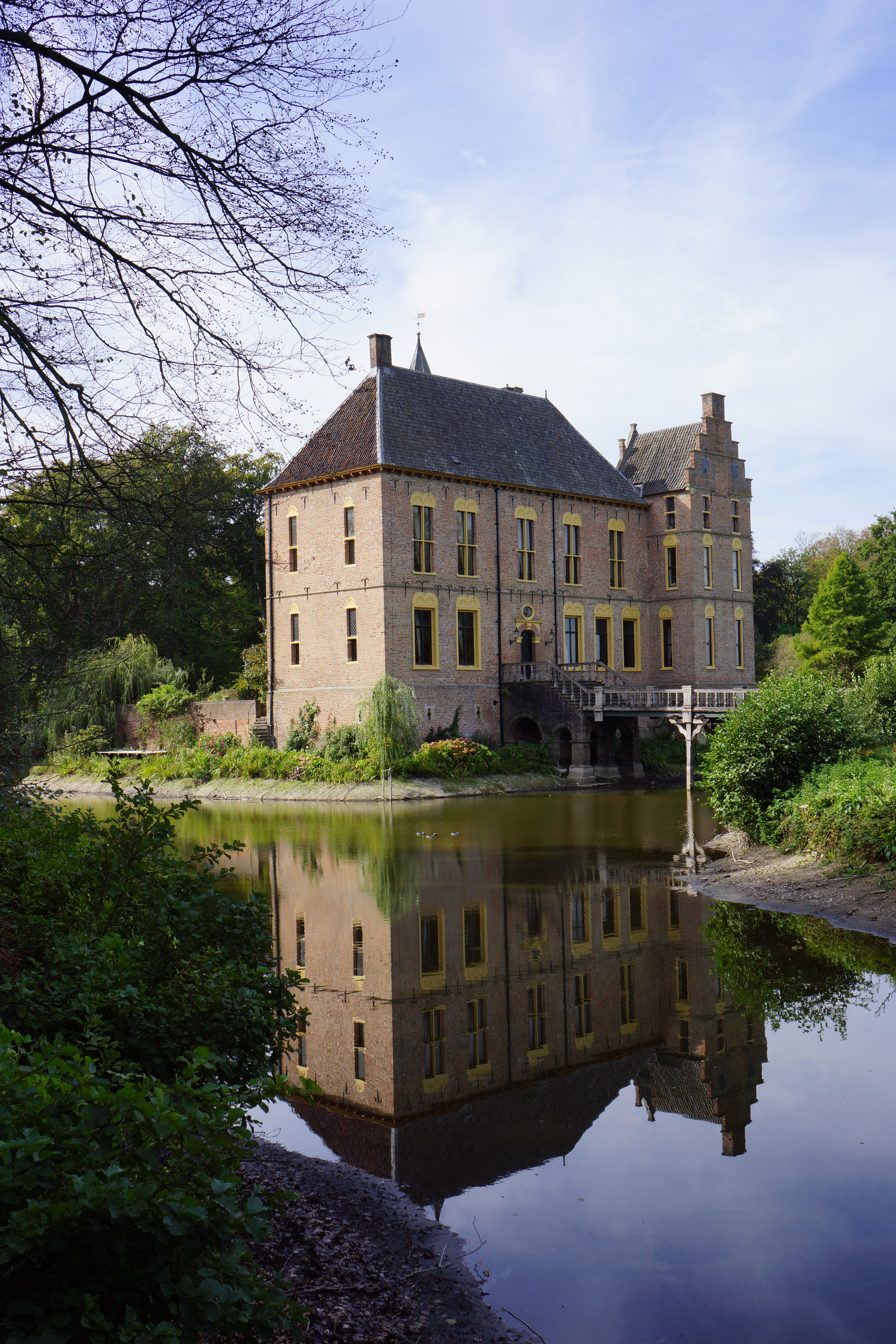
Castle Vorden where part of the film shooting took place

The companies were ready to film in July 1942 and starting filming that summer. The exterior filming took place at Castle Vorden and the interior filming took place at Profitli's studios in The Hague.

In December 1942, the movie was ready for review. The authorities demanded amongst others that the sentence 'Moed houden maar, altijd maar moed houden' (transl. 'keep courage, always keep courage') had to be changed into 'Volhouden maar, altijd maar volhouden' (transl. 'keep persevering, always keep persevering'), but otherwise approved the film.

== Release ==
In January 1943, it was announced that the premiere would take place in February 1943 in City Theatre in Amsterdam. For unknown reasons, the premier did not take place it would take another year before the film was first shown in cinema, on 17 March 1944. There was little interest in the film, and it quickly disappeared from theaters.

The movie was re-released after the liberation of the Netherlands in 1945.

== Reception ==
The film received mostly negative reviews. Chris de Graaff called it a "a rather salty affair" in Algemeen Handelsblad, while Joop Lücker called it "flabby, weak, and characterless, old-fashioned and unconvincing" in De Telegraaf.

The Nazi press admitted the film had no 'cinematic qualities', but wanted to give the Dutch film industry the benefit of the doubt and saw the film as a first step. For example, SS journalist Sybren Modderman wrote in the De Waag: "Once this production reaches full fruition, it will constitute an enrichment for the film industry of the Germanic countries, for it will add a unique facet of its own."
