= Life's Shadows (1916 Dutch film) =

- Directed by: Theo Frenkel
- Written by: Theo Frenkel
- Release date: 21 July 1916
- Country: Netherlands
- Language: Silent

Life's Shadows (Dutch: Levensschaduwen) is a 1916 Dutch silent crime film directed by Theo Frenkel.

== Cast ==
- Coen Hissink - Henri van Dijck
- Mary Beekman - Van Dijck's vrouw / Van Dijck's wife
- Cor Smits - Manager / Manager
- Tonny Stevens - Van Dijck's zoon / Van Dijck's zoon
- Balthazar Verhagen
- Herre de Vos
- Jan Wensma - Priester / Priest
- Willem Faassen - Jonge dief / Young thief
- Kees Lageman
- Piet Urban - Rechter / Judge
- Sylvain Poons - D van chique gezelschap bij aanhouding van een dievegge
- Annie Wesling
- Toon van Elsen
- Jacques Sluyters
- Jan Lemaire Sr.
