= Aan boord van de 'Sabina' =

1920 film

- Directed by: Theo Frenkel
- Written by: Theo Frenkel
- Produced by: Theo Frenkel
- Production company: Amsterdam Film Cie.
- Release date: 16 April 1920
- Running time: 2 reels
- Country: Netherlands
- Language: Silent

Aan boord van de 'Sabina' is a 1920 Dutch silent short drama film directed by Theo Frenkel.

== Cast ==
- Frits Bouwmeester
- Lily Bouwmeester
- Frits Engels
- Dio Huysmans
- Kees Lageman

== Summary ==
The skipper of the barge Sabina, who is also the father of an eighteen-year-old daughter, hires a new mate. The two youngsters soon feel attracted to each other. Another admirer gives the girl an expensive gift. This makes the mate gloomy, because he doesn't have enough money to do the same. Theft seems to be the solution to his problem, but the result is that he ends up in prison. The skipper has to sail on and his daughter tows the heavy boat through the canals. After six months in prison, the mate returns to the Sabina, where the skipper and his daughter welcome him.
