= Voorbeschikten =

1920 film

- Directed by: Tonny Stevens
- Written by: Jean Stapelveld; Tonny Stevens
- Release date: 1920
- Running time: 83 minutes
- Country: Netherlands
- Language: Silent

Voorbeschikten is a 1920 Dutch silent drama film directed by Tonny Stevens.

== Cast ==
- Jan Van Ees - Jonckheer Axel van Hoogveld
- Roosje Köhler-van Gelder - Odette van der Zee
- Jan C. De Vos - Leo, een vriend van Axel
- Tonny Stevens - Lou
- Bertha de Vos-von Gentner - Colette
- Gerard Vrolik - Willem, Axels bediende
