= Coen Hissink =

Dutch actor (1878–1942)

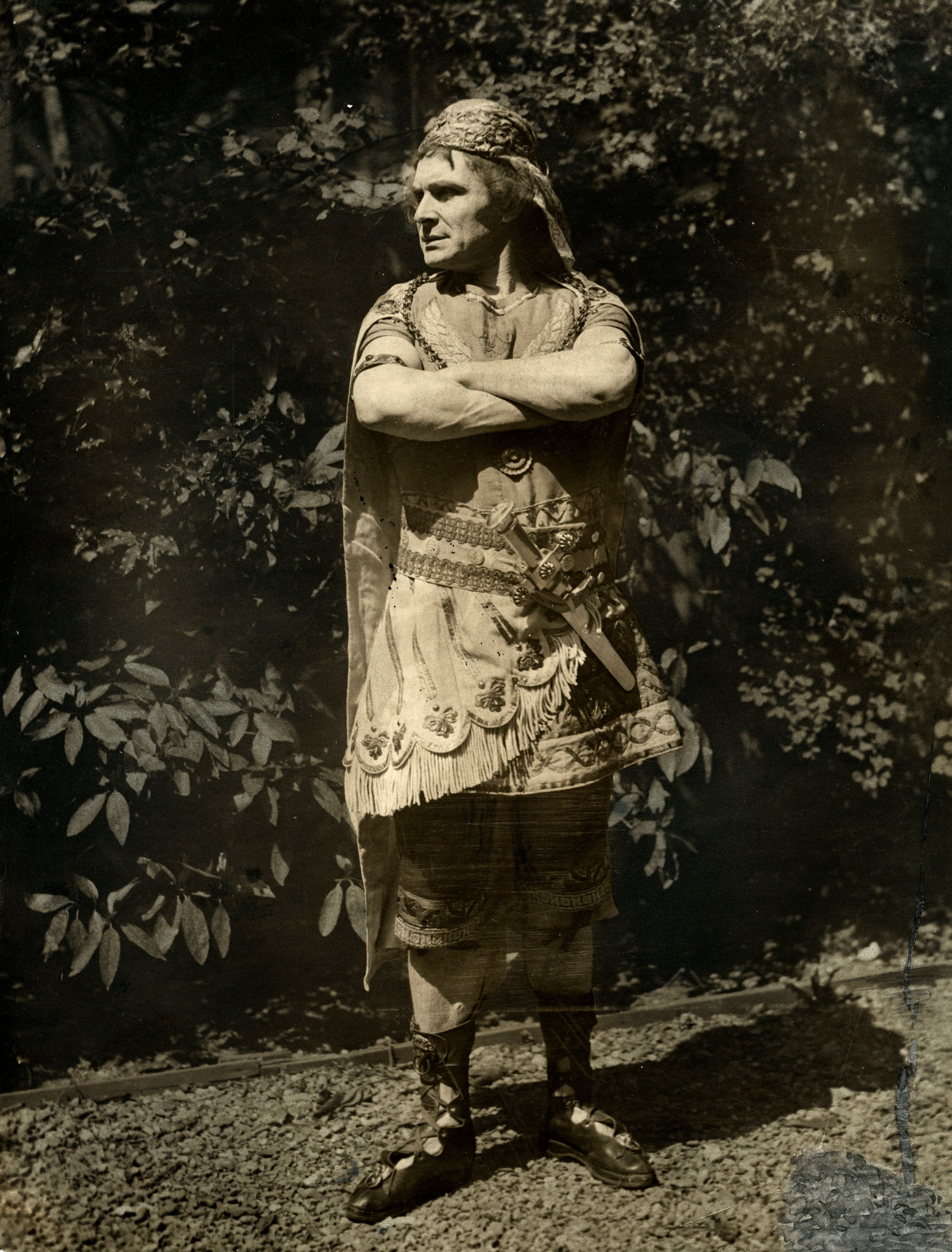
- Coen Hissink in the play Salomé in 1917
- Born: 5 October 1878; Kampen, Netherlands
- Died: 17 February 1942 (aged 63); Neuengamme concentration camp, Germany
- Occupation: Actor
- Years active: 1914-1942

Johan Coenraad "Coen" Hissink (5 October 1878 – 17 February 1942) was a Dutch film actor of the silent era. He appeared in 25 films between 1914 and 1942. He also wrote short stories and books about controversial topics such as homosexuality, prostitution and cocaine. During the Second World War, he became a member of the resistance. He was interned at Neuengamme concentration camp in 1941 and died there in 1942.

== Filmography ==
- De Laatste Dagen van een Eiland (1942)
- Snow White and the Seven Dwarfs (1938) (Dutch original dub)
- De man zonder hart (1937)
- Klokslag twaalf (1936)
- Merijntje Gijzens Jeugd (1936)
- Op hoop van zegen (1934)
- De cabaret-prinses (1925)
- Amsterdam bij nacht (1924)
- Frauenmoral (1923)
- The Man in the Background (1922)
- Alexandra (1922)
- De bruut (1922)
- Menschenwee (1921)
- De zwarte tulp (1921)
- Blood Money (1921)
- Schakels (1920)
- Pro domo (1918)
- Het proces Begeer (1918)
- Levensschaduwen (1916)
- Het geheim van den vuurtoren (1916)
- Het wrak van de Noorzee (1915)
- Ontmaskerd (1915)
- De vrouw Clasina (1915)
- Fatum (1915)
- De vloek van het testament (1915)
- Een telegram uit Mexico (1914)
