= Toil of Men =

Toil of men

Menschenwee is a 1903 Dutch socialist novel by Israël Querido. The 1910 translation, Toil of Men, was read, among others, by D.H. Lawrence. Socialist elements are evident in his treatment of the human condition in this novel, a detailed description of the miseries he witnessed among the people of Beverwijk, where he was then living.
