= Sheer Bluff =

1921 film

- Directed by: Frank Richardson
- Written by: Benedict James
- Produced by: Maurits Binger
- Release date: 14 December 1921
- Countries: United Kingdom; Netherlands
- Language: Silent

Sheer Bluff (Dutch: Zaken zijn zaken) is a 1921 British-Dutch silent drama film directed by Frank Richardson.

== Cast ==
- Henry Victor - Maurice Hardacre
- Maudie Dunham - Esther
- Percy Standing - Jasper Hardacre
- Nico De Jong - Stokes
- Lily Bouwmeester - Marion Deslisle
- Hans Bruning - (as Hans Brüning)
- Theo Frenkel Jr.
- Fred Homann
- Willem Hunsche
- William Hunter
- Julie Meijer
- Julie Ruston
- Lilian Ruston
- Julie Ruys
- Jean Stapelveld
- August Van den Hoeck
- Marie Van Westerhoven
