= Frauenmoral =

1923 film

- Directed by: Theo Frenkel
- Written by: Theo Frenkel; Paul Beyer
- Cinematography: Georg Muschner
- Release date: 26 October 1923
- Running time: 93 minutes
- Countries: Weimar Republic; Netherlands
- Language: Silent

Frauenmoral (English: Women's Morals, Dutch: Het recht tot trouwen) is a 1923 German-Dutch silent film directed by Theo Frenkel.

== Cast ==
- Olga Engl
- Helena Makowska – Jane Williams
- Theo Mann-Bouwmeester – Jane's stiefmoeder
- Fritz Marion
- Oskar Marion – John Ayre
- Anton Pointner – Harry Robinson jr.
- Coen Hissink – Jane's stiefbroer
- Harry Hardt
- Lili Alexandra
- Adolf Klein – Henry Robinson sr.
- Willy Kaiser-Heyl
