= Artistenrevue =

1926 film

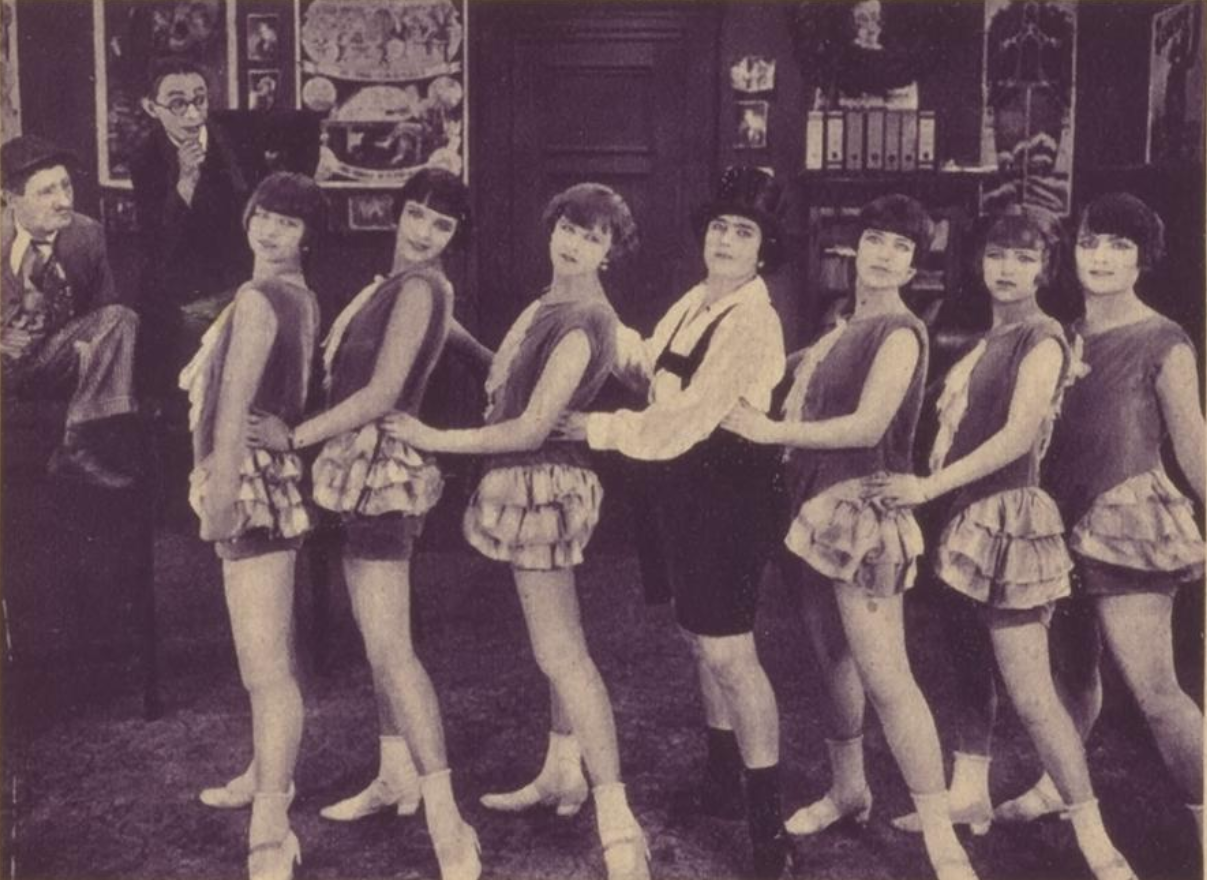
- Directed by: Alex Benno
- Written by: Alex Benno; Michel Solser
- Cinematography: W. P. Schefer
- Release date: 29 October 1926
- Country: Netherlands
- Language: Silent

Artistenrevue is a 1926 Dutch silent comedy film directed by Alex Benno.

== Cast ==
- Alex De Meester - Directeur
- Isodoor Zwaaf - Flipje
- Pauline de Munnik - (as Pauline Hervé)
- Cesarine Prinz - (as Césarine Speenhoff-Prinz)
- Marie Schafstad
- Stella Seemer
- Koos Speenhoff
- Aida de Beau Clair
- Matthieu van Eysden
- Adèle Boesnach
