= Nola Hatterman =

Dutch actress and painter (1899–1984)

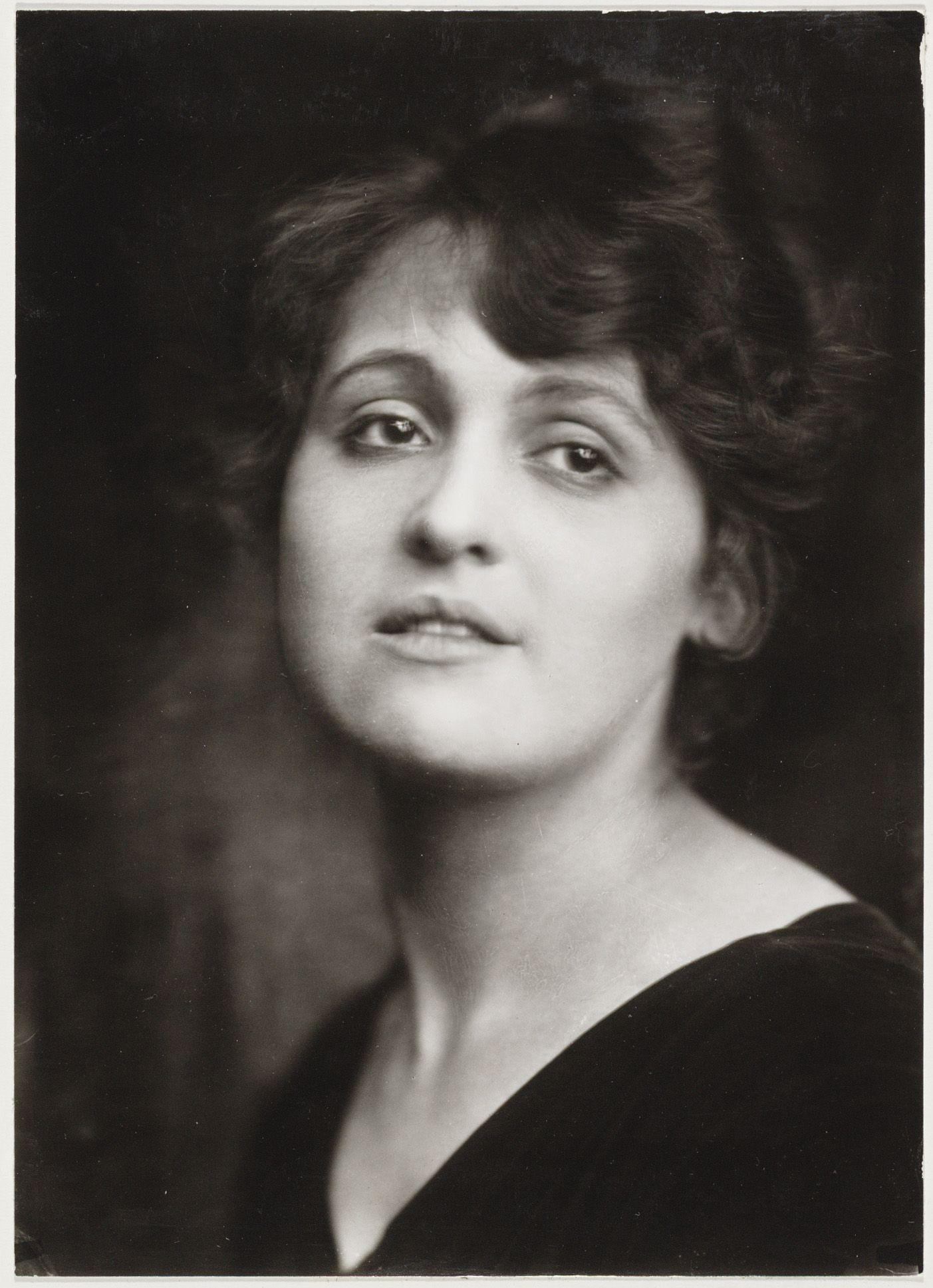
- early promotional photograph as an actress
- Born: 12 August 1899; Amsterdam, Netherlands
- Died: 8 May 1984 (aged 84); Paramaribo, Suriname

Nola Hatterman (12 August 1899 – 8 May 1984) was a Dutch actress and painter.

Hatterman was born in Amsterdam as an only child in a large house on the Middenweg in the Watergraafsmeer district. Her father was an accountant with Mirandolle, Voûte & Co. She drew and painted from a young age and followed an education at the gymnasium. Among her school friends were many Indonesian students whose parents were affiliated with her father's offices. Later she would reminisce about these early friendships and explain that they were the seed for her passion for painting colored people.

== Acting career ==
In 1914 she continued to paint, but chose to study at the Amsterdam Acting school (Toneel Academie). In 1918 she joined the Rotterdam acting house NV Het Rotterdams Toneel. She returned to Amsterdam after joining the national KVHNT and acted in the Stadsschouwburg Amsterdam. In the same period she also acted in a few films from 1916-1925 but gave it up when her parents moved to the Falckstraat. She had a workshop of her own in the attic there, where she could concentrate on painting.

== Painting career ==
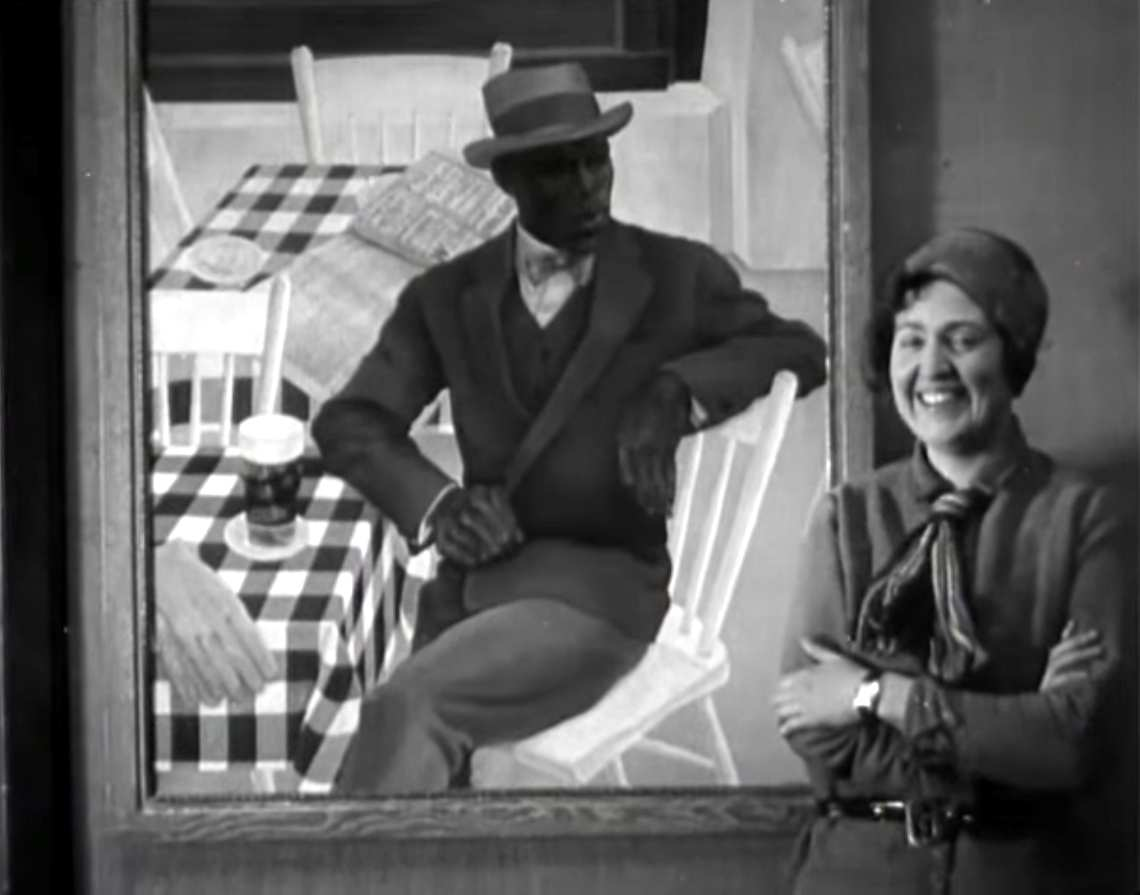
Nola Hatterman and work, 1932

She took lessons from Vittorio Schiavon and Charles Haak. She also came in contact with Surinamers who earned money as models. One of them, Frans Vroom, moved in the downstairs apartment for a short period after her father died. Through her association with Surinamers, she became more politically active and became very impressed with the 1934 book by Anton de Kom, We Slaves of Surinam (Wij slaven van Suriname). She decided to work on historical illustrations to educate children about their heroes, and specifically, anatomically correct representations of colored people in art for children. She slowly formed the idea of going to Paramaribo to open a school and begin creating such illustrations, but was delayed by the war.

After her mother died, in 1953 she moved to Paramaribo and began to live her dream. According to a late interview, she was most proud of a series of history paintings of Surinam. She taught many students to draw and paint, and notable pupils were Armand Baag and Ruben Karsters. Baag interviewed her in the 1982 film Nola Hatterman (en de konsekwente keuze).

Hatterman died in a car crash near Lantiman Kampoe on her way to her own exposition in Paramaribo.

== Works ==
Nola Hatterman is best known for her portraits of people of color, but she also made still-life paintings and illustrations for magazines. Works by Hatterman are held mostly in private collections, but a few paintings are in the Stedelijk Museum, Tropenmuseum, and the Surinaams Museum.

== Nola Hatterman Art Academy ==
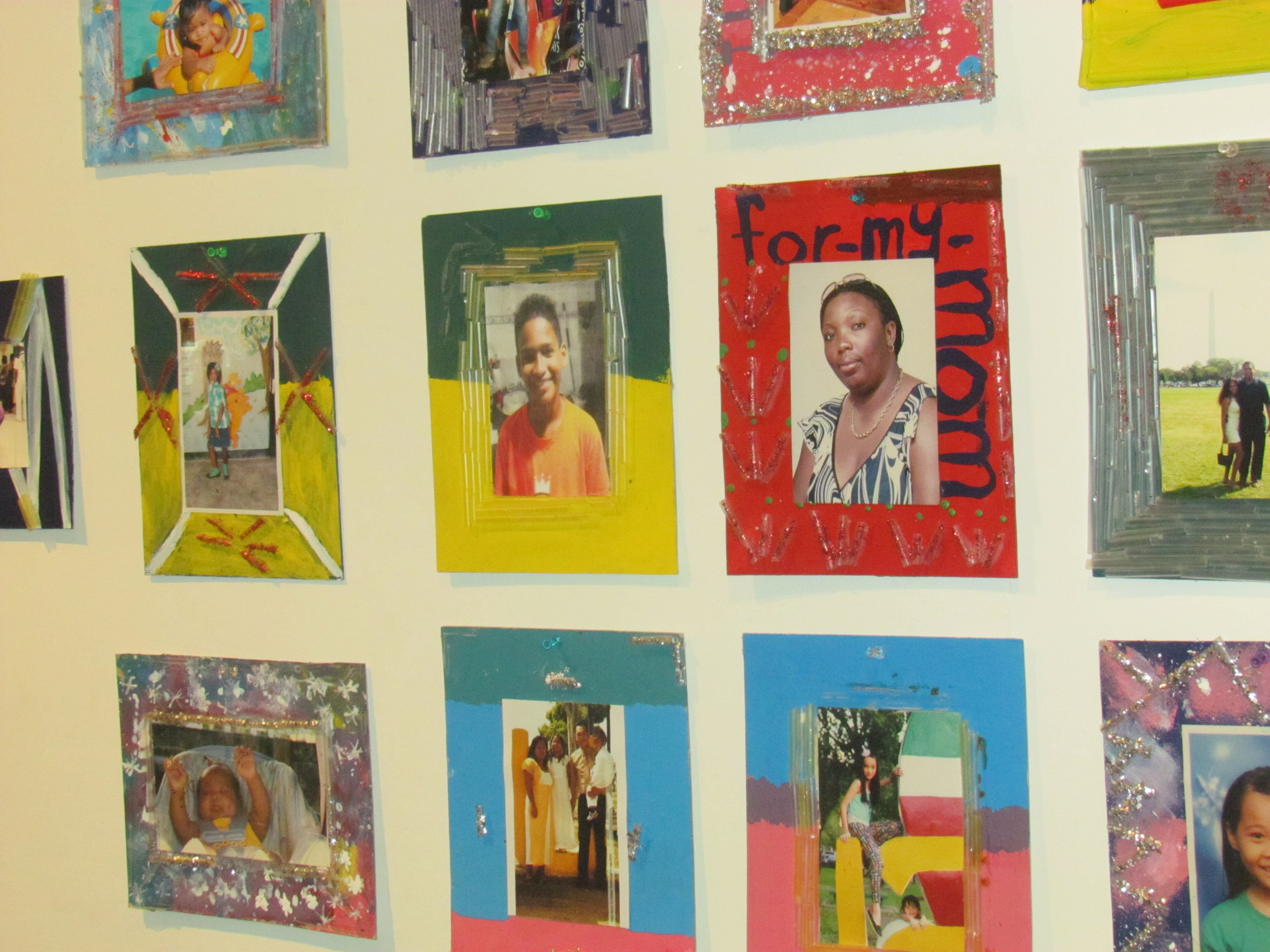

In 1984, after her death, the Nola Hatterman Institute was opened by her former students. The name was later changed to Nola Hatterman Art Academy. The Academy is located in the former commander's house in Fort Zeelandia, Paramaribo. In 1997, an art gallery was opened by members of Ons Suriname. This gallery specialises in Surinamese art and annually displays an artist connected to the Nola Hatterman Art Academy.
