= Ray of Sunshine =

- Directed by: Theo Frenkel
- Written by: Theo Frenkel
- Release date: 12 December 1919
- Running time: 90 minutes
- Country: Netherlands
- Language: Silent

Ray of Sunshine (Dutch: Zonnestraal) is a 1919 Dutch silent film directed by Theo Frenkel.

== Cast ==
- Kees Lageman - Jan van Zutphen
- Frits Bouwmeester - Maurits Groen
- Annie Wesling - Maurits Groen's vrouw
