= Jaap van der Poll =

Dutch javelin thrower

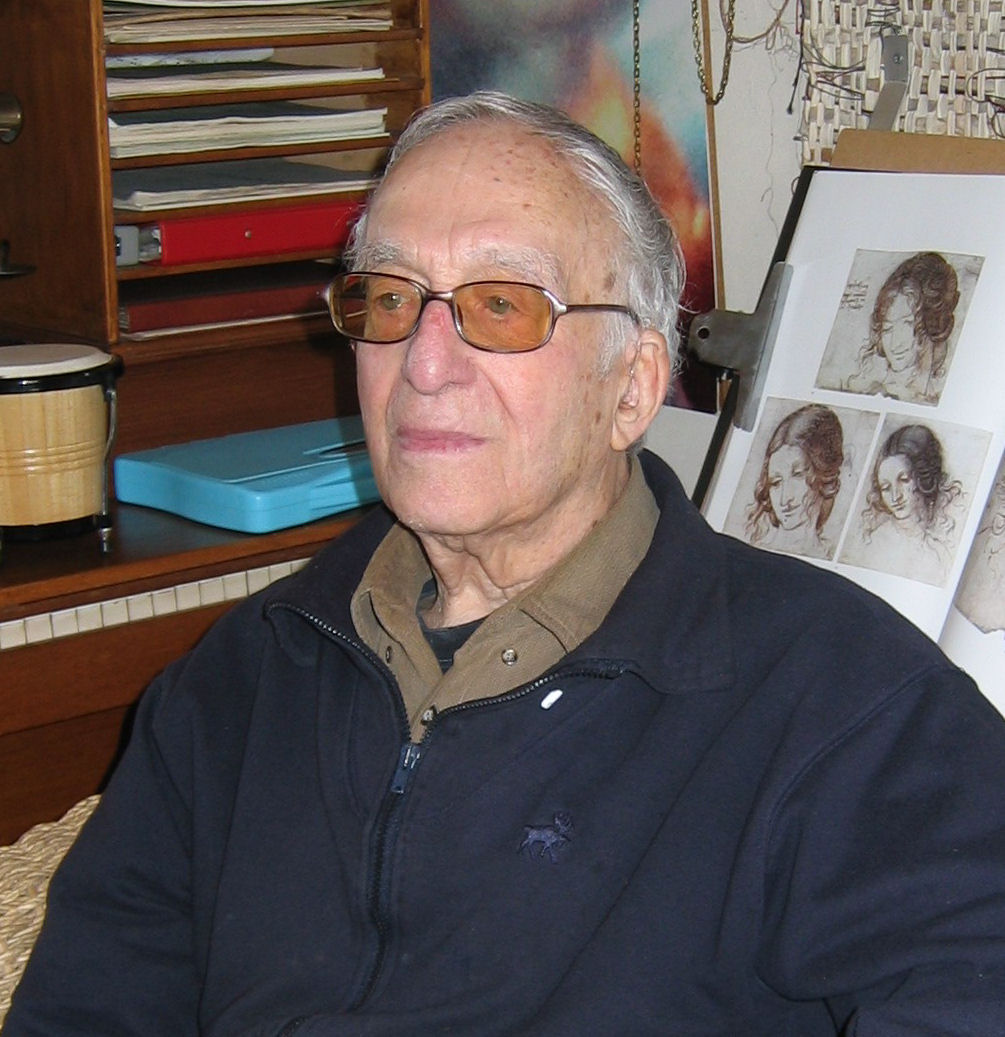

Personal information
- Nationality: Dutch
- Born: 1 May 1914 Amsterdam, Netherlands
- Died: 1 February 2010 (aged 95) Castricum, Netherlands
- Children: 6

Sport
- Sport: Athletics
- Event: javelin
- Club: AV '23 Amsterdam

Johan Frederik van der Poll (1 May 1914 – 1 February 2010) was a Dutch javelin thrower who competed at the 1936 Summer Olympics.

== Biography ==
Van der Poll finished third behind Lennart Atterwall in the javelin throw event at the British 1935 AAA Championships and won the British AAA Championships title in the javelin throw event at the 1936 AAA Championships.

At the 1936 Olympic Games in Berlin, he threw in the first round, but had to withdraw due to kidney stones. He commented on his Olympic appearance saying "I felt flattered that I was allowed into the Olympic Games. I was in my eyes only just started with that sport. My friends also said: Go! I made a sporting choice. When I returned I was again welcome to my Jewish friends. That was a comfort to me".

After the Games, Van der Poll left to work in the Dutch West Indies and was later held as a Prisoner of War in Japan. He died on 1 February 2010.
