= Menschenwee (film) =

1921 film

- Directed by: Theo Frenkel
- Written by: Theo Frenkel; Israël Querido
- Release date: 28 October 1921
- Running time: 88 minutes
- Country: Netherlands
- Language: Silent

Menschenwee is a 1921 Dutch silent film directed by Theo Frenkel, based on the 1903 novel of the same name by Israël Querido. Only one fragment of the movie of the film is known to exist today, which is kept at the EYE Filmmuseum.

== Plot ==
Balthazar is the owner of a notorious bar on the Zeedijk, where one day a murder takes place. A young boy witnesses the incident and sees how the bar owner murders captain Beets in cold blood, so he does not have to pay for his services, namely a package of diamonds that Beets wants to sell him. Beets' daughter Eva and her fiance do everything they can to make the bar owner confess to the murder.

== Cast ==
- Willem van der Veer - Captain Beets
- Coen Hissink - Balthazar, 'de Tijger'
- Kitty Kluppell - Eva, Beets' daughter
- Louis Davids - Willy Vermeer
- Jan Lemaire Jr. - Zwervertje
- Vera van Haeften - Caroline, Beets' older daughter
