= Behind the Clouds the Sun Is Shining =

1925 film

- Directed by: Willy Mullens
- Written by: J. A. Putto
- Produced by: Willy Mullens
- Release date: 10 November 1925
- Running time: 60 minutes
- Country: Netherlands
- Language: Silent

Behind the Clouds the Sun Is Shining (Dutch: Achter de wolken schijnt de zon) is a 1925 Dutch silent documentary film directed by Willy Mullens.

== Cast ==
- B. A. Huijsers - Meneer Van den Heuvel
- Mevrouw Huijsers - Zijn vrouw
- Mientje Mullens - Annetje
- J. Nijland - Welzijnswerkster
