= Oranje Hein (1925 film) =

1925 film

- Directed by: Alex Benno
- Written by: Alex Benno; Herman Bouber
- Cinematography: H. W. Metman
- Edited by: Piet Vermeulen
- Release date: 2 October 1925
- Country: Netherlands
- Language: Silent

Oranje Hein is a 1925 Dutch silent film directed by Alex Benno.

== Cast ==
- Johan Elsensohn - Hein de Klopper alias Oranje Hein
- Aaf Bouber - Aal, vrouw van Hein
- Maurits de Vries - Thijs
- Vera van Haeften - Ant, vrouw van Thijs
- Marie Van Westerhoven - Moeder van Ant
- August Van den Hoeck - Vader van Ant
- Heintje Davids - Naatje Visch
- Pauline Hervé
- Riek Kloppenburg - (as Rika Kloppenburg)
- Marie Schafstad
- Elize le Maire
- Jetty Kremer
- Anton Gerlach
- Piet Fuchs
- Harry Boda
