= Lily Bouwmeester =

Dutch actress (1901–1993)

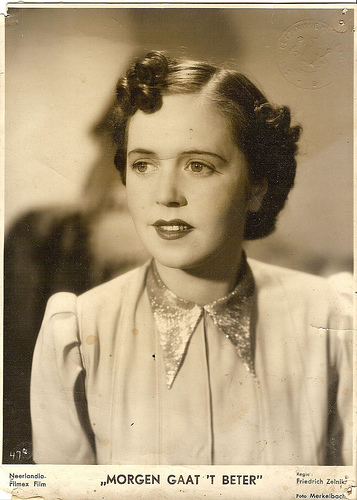
- Bouwmeester in a promotional photo for Tomorrow It Will Be Better (1939)
- Born: Lily Geertruida Maria Henriëtte Bouwmeester; 28 September 1901; Amsterdam, Netherlands
- Died: 12 July 1993 (aged 91); Sliedrecht, Netherlands
- Years active: 1916–1940
- Spouses: Theodoor Frenkel Jr. (1921–1933); Cornelis Leendert van der Lugt Melsert (1935–1990)

Lily Geertruida Maria Henriëtte Bouwmeester (28 September 1901 – 12 July 1993) was a Dutch theater and film actress, who was crowned with a Golden Calf for being "the best actress in Pre-War Dutch cinema".

== Biography ==
The daughter of violinist Ludovicus Adolphus Bouwmeester and pianist Julie Marie Arpeau, Lily Bouwmeester was born in Amsterdam. As a child, she toured with her parents through Europe, while preparing to become a violinist as well. The touring proved to be too exhausting for Bouwmeester, so she moved in with her aunt in 1913, the actress Theo Mann-Bouwmeester. She dreamed to become a dancer, but her aunt demanded for her to become an actress and sent her to several auditions. At the age of 14, she debuted in a theatre production of Herman Heijermans.

In 1916, Bouwmeester started acting in silent films as well. She debuted in the film Majoor Frans (1916), which starred Annie Bos. In 1917, she landed a contract with a prestigious theatre in Amsterdam and performed at the Stadsschouwburg. She was praised by theatre critics and gained more acting experience. While working on a play in 1920, she met actor Theo Frenkel Jr., whom she married to in 1921. She left the Stadsschouwburg to produce her own plays with her husband. They moved to the Hague in 1923 and performed in Rotterdam, where she became more famous.

Through the years, Bouwmeester developed in theatre and decided she was on her best at comedic roles. She and her husband divorced in 1933. Two years later, she married Cor van der Lugt Melsert, with whom she moved to Rotterdam. He had the desire of her becoming a housewife. Bouwmeester, needing a break from acting, did what she was asked to and left the theatre. However, she didn't give up acting. In 1935, when the sound film had just been introduced in the Netherlands, she auditioned for the lead role in The Cross-Patch (1935), but had no luck. However, she was noticed by director Ludwig Berger, who cast her in Pygmalion (1937). It would be her first film since 1921.

Pygmalion grew out to be the most successful Dutch Pre-War film. She became an instant star and was offered a five-year contract with Paramount Pictures. She declined, however, because her husband was unwilling to travel to the United States with her. Instead, she remained acting in the biggest movie productions of the 1930s. Her following films all became box office hits, with only one exception. Despite nearing the age of 40, she usually played teen girls or young women. In 1940, her career ended abruptly, when World War II broke out.

During World War II, Bouwmeester secretly took in two Jewish children in her home. After the liberation in 1945, she was offered movie roles again, but declined all offers. She decided to return to theatre instead and played in the famous stage production of Pygmalion. She was also remembered for playing the lead role in the play Het Hemelbed in 1952. In 1969, she resigned from acting completely. After the death of her husband in 1990, she moved to Sliedrecht, where she spent the rest of her life in complete loneliness. She died in 1993, at the age of 92. She was cremated in the Hague.

== Filmography ==
Year	Film	Role	Other notes
1916	Majoor Frans	Young Francis	
1917	Het geheim van Delft	Lilly Vogel	
1917	Ulbo Garvema	Anna as a kid	
1918	Pro domo	Their daughter	
1919	The Devil in Amsterdam	Sick sister of Thérèse	
1919	Het goudvischje	Greta's sister	
1920	Aan boord van de 'Sabina'		
1920	Helleveeg	Louise	
1921	Sheer Bluff	Marion Deslisle	Dutch-English film
1937	Pygmalion	Elisa 'Liesje' Doeluttel	
1938	Forty Years	Annetje Maasdonk	
1938	Vadertje Langbeen	Judy Aalders	
1939	Tomorrow It Will Be Better	Wilhelmina 'Willy' Verhulst	
1940	Ergens in Nederland	Nellie van Loon	
