= Adriënne Solser =

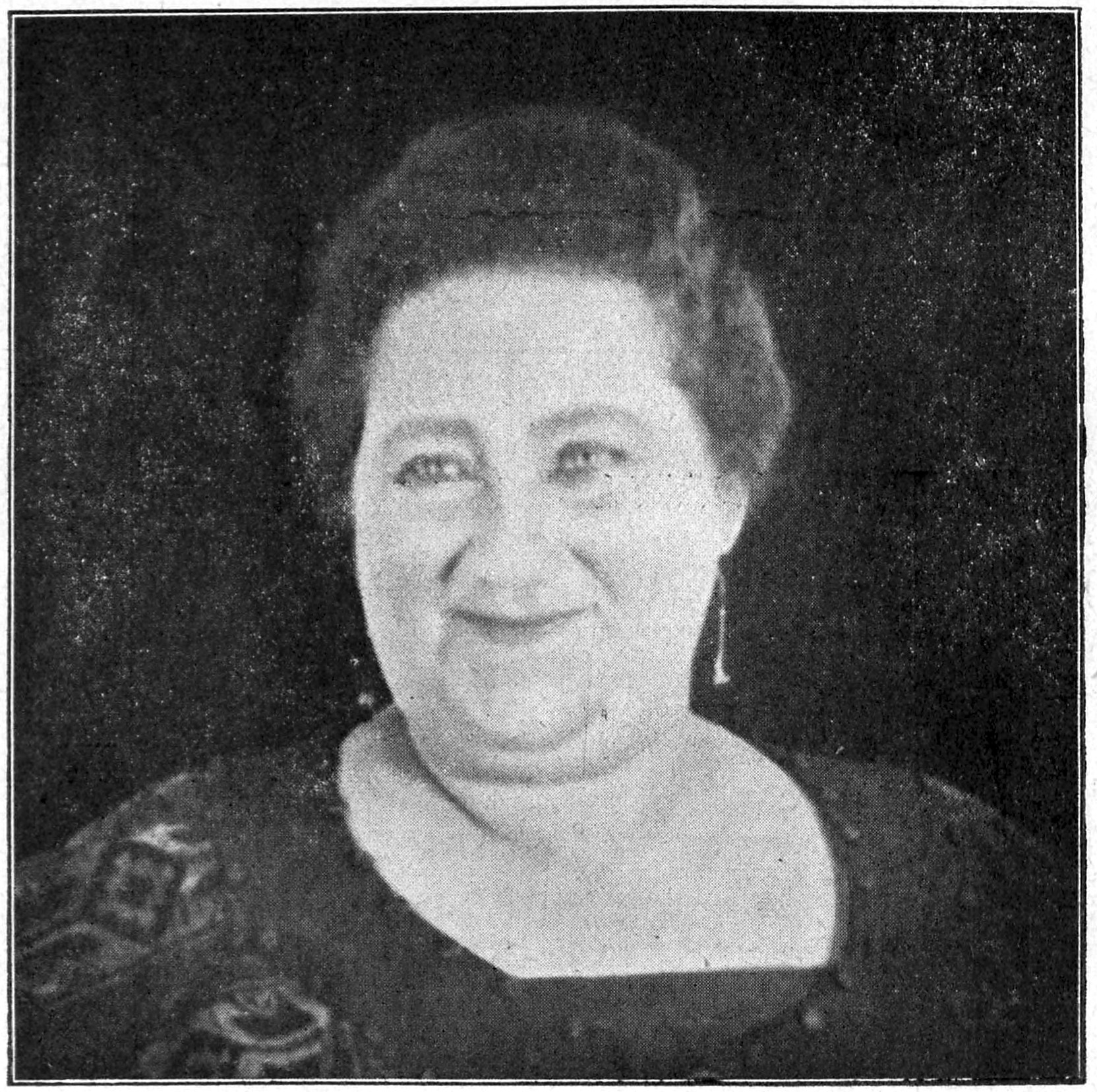
Adriënne Solser, 1925

Adriënne Solser was a Dutch comedian, variety artist, actress, and director during the silent era. She was the founder of the Dutch-Belgian Film Company "Eureka" from 1924 to 1928. She is noted as being one of the few women who directed silent era films in the Netherlands, alongside Caroline van Dommelen.

== Early life ==
Born Engelina Adriana Solser in 1873 to Engelina Hartlooper and Johannes Solser, the family collectively performed on stage as the Van der Vank troupe, managed by Johannes. She was the fourth of five children. Her siblings include Michel Solser and Lion Solser. She began performing in Dutch variety shows as early as 1885 with her parents' company.

== Career ==
In 1889, Solser performed solo as an intro act to her brother, Michel, who was contracted with the café-concert, the Victoria in Amsterdam as a comedian in 1887. She spent some time abroad, with few performances through the 1890s, and returned to the Netherlands by 1900.

During this period, she began performing regularly, touring to venues in Amsterdam, Rotterdam, the Hague, and other cities. These shows were mostly variety programs, similar at the time to vaudeville. Critics noted the success of her shows with audiences.

In particular, Solser's work is considered Jordaan-genre, a Dutch genre characterized by its use of street language, humor, and stories centered around ordinary, usually low-income individuals. It was named for the Jordaan neighbourhood in Amsterdam. It remained popular from the early 20th century to the 1930s, both in theatre, and later, film.

By 1914, Solser had found success among critics and audiences. Around this time, she began to perform often in the particular comic persona, "Bet," a working-class Amsterdam woman. This character remained a staple of her career from there on.

In the late 1910s, Solser also sometimes performed acts between film screenings. She made her first screen appearance in the comedy film De Droom Van Hadt-Je-Me-Maar (1921), directed by Alex Benno. Solser continued to appear in his films until 1924.

In 1924, Solser founded a film company with her son, Andre Boesnach, who had trained as a projectionist and director in Paris. Their first film was Bet, Queen of Jordan. It was advertised as being Solser's final film, though it did not turn out to be. The company began in Amsterdam, then later moved to Schoten, and finally, moved to Schiedam.

Although Solser's films were silent, live music and commentary were an intended part of the viewer experience. Notably, Solser herself often travelled with the films to perform live, where audiences would participate or sing along. In 1927, she announced she would no longer be performing live alongside her films, but planned to continue filming. She began to perform again nonetheless, at the latest, four years later, during the first run of her last film.

Solser and Boesnach's other films were Bet trekt de 100.000 (1925), and Bet Zit in de penarie (1926). During the creation of the fourth Bet film, Bet naar de Olympiade (1928), Boesnach passed away from influenza. Theo Frenkel took over the role of director.

In 1928, several months after the release of Bet nar de Olympiade, due to continued financial difficulties, Solser sold the studio.

Solser continued to tour with her films in the following years, performing on stage alongside them. Critics noted that her live acts were what made her films 'a hit'.

Solser died in 1943 at the age of 70.
