= Theo Frenkel =

Dutch film director (1871–1956)

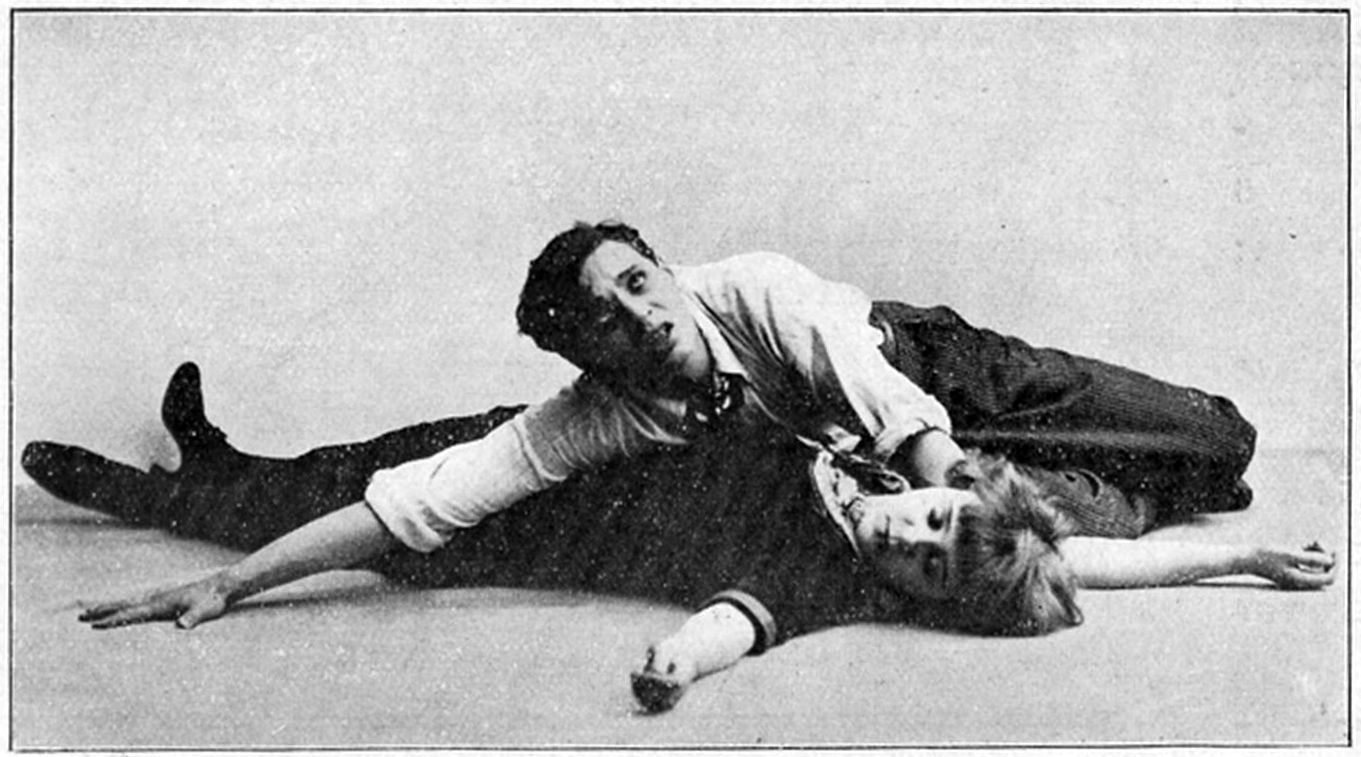
- Theo Frenkel (top) and Coba Kinsbergen performing a dance in 1914
- Born: Theodorus Maurits Frenkel; 14 July 1871; Rotterdam, Netherlands
- Died: 20 September 1956 (aged 85); Amsterdam, Netherlands
- Occupations: Film director Actor; Screenwriter
- Years active: 1908–1948

Theodorus Maurita Frenkel (14 July 1871 – 20 September 1956) was a Dutch film director, actor and screenwriter of the silent era. He worked in Britain under the name Theo Bouwmeester for the Natural Color Kinematograph Company, using the surname of his renowned mother and uncle (both accomplished actors), before working in Germany in 1913 and 1914 and then returning to the Netherlands, a neutral country, before World War I. He directed more than 200 films between 1908 and 1928. He also appeared in 21 films between 1911 and 1948. His nephew Theo Frenkel Jr. (1893–1955) was a film actor.

== Selected filmography ==
- By Order of Napoleon (1910 – director, early feature in Kinemacolor)
- Luchtkastelen (1914 – actor)
- Zijn viool (1914 – actor)
- Fatum (1915)
- Het Wrak in de Noordzee (1915)
- Genie tegen geweld (1916)
- Life's Shadows (1916)
- Pro domo (1918)
- Het proces Begeer (1918)
- De duivel (1918)
- Ray of Sunshine (1919)
- The Devil in Amsterdam (1919)
- Op stap door Amsterdam (1919)
- Helleveeg (1920)
- Aan boord van de 'Sabina' (1920)
- Geeft ons kracht (1920)
- Menschenwee (1921)
- De bruut (1922)
- Judith (1923)
- Frauenmoral (1923)
- Cirque hollandais (1924)
- De cabaret-prinses (1925)
- Bet naar de Olympiade (1928)
