= List of Dutch films of the 1910s =

This is a list of films produced in the Netherlands during the 1910s. The films are produced in the Dutch language.

Title	Director	Cast	Genre	Notes
1911
Ontrouw	Louis Chrispijn jr	Kees Lageman; Caroline van Dommelen	Drama	
De Bannelingen	Leon Boedels; Caroline van Dommelen	Caroline van Dommelen, Louis van Dommelen	Drama	First Dutch film which was directed by a woman
1912
Roze Kate	Oscar Tourniaire	Jan van Dommelen; Caroline van Dommelen	Drama; Thriller	
Vrouwenoogen	Caroline van Dommelen	Caroline van Dommelen		
1913
De Levende Ladder	Maurits Binger; Louis H Crispijn	Annie Bos, Alex Benno	Drama	First movie by Filmfabriek Hollandia
Nederland en Oranje	Louis H Chrispijn, Jan van Dommelen	Annie Bos; Jan Buderman	Historical Drama	
De Afwezige	Albert Capellani	Henri Rollan	Drama	French co-production
Don Juan	Léon Boedels	Willem van der Veer		
Krates	Louis H. Chrispijn	Cor Laurentius; Charles Gilhuys		
Silvia Silombra	Louis H. Chrispijn	Julia Cuypers; Willem van der Veer		
1914
Heilig Recht	Louis H Crispijn	Annie Bos; Louis Bouwmeester	Drama	
De Bloemen die de Ziel Vertroosten	Louis H. Chrispijn	Mientje Kling		Short film
Liefde Waakt	Louis H. Chrispijn	Annie Bos; Willem van der Veer	Western	
Luchtkastelen	Louis H. Chrispijn	Annie Bos; Willem van der Veer		
De Stradivarus	Maurits Binger; Louis H Chrispijn	Boris Lensky	Drama	
Toffe Jongens onder de Mobilisatie	Jan van Dommelen	Annie Bos; Louis van Dommelen		
Weergevonden	Louis H. Chrispijn	Louis H. Chrispijn; Enny de Leeuwe		
De Zigeunerin	Louis H. Chrispijn	Christine van Meeteren; Louis H. Chrispijn		Short film
1915
Het Geheim van het Slot Arco	Maurits Binger	Jan van Dommelen	Drama; Horror	The film is lost
Fatum	Theo Frenkel	Louis Bouwmeester		
De Vloek van het Testament	Maurits Binger; Louis H Chrispijn	Annie Bos; Willem van der Veer	Drama	
Het Wrak in de Noordzee	Theo Frenkel	Coen Hissink	Fisherman's drama	
De Vrouw Clazina	Maurits Binger	Louis H Chrispijn; Annie Bos	Drama	
Ontmaskerd	Mime Misu	Annie Bos; Jack Hamel	Drama	
Koningin Elisabeth's Dochter	Johan Gildemeijer	Julia Cuypers	Drama	
Liefdesstrijd	Maurits Binger	Annie Bos; Willem van der Veer		
1916
Majoor Frans	Maurits Binger	Annie Bos, Jan van Dommelen	Drama	
Vogelvrij	Maurits Binger	Annie Bos; Lola Cornero	Drama	
Geheim van de Vuurtoren	Maurits Binger; Louis H Chrispijn	Willem van der Veer; Louis H Chrispijn	Drama; Mysterie	
Een Danstragedie	Johan Gildemeijer	Adelqui Migliar; Meina Irwen		
Diamant	Johan Gildemeijer	Louis Bouwmeester; Esther De Boer-van Rijk		
Genie Tegen Geweld	Theo Frenkel	Adelqui Migliar		
Levensschaduwen	Theo Frenkel	Coen Hissink; Mary Beekman		
Liefdesoffer	Maurits Binger	Annie Bos; Willem van der Veer		
La Renzoni	Maurits Binger	Annie Bos; Willem van der Veer		
1917
Het Geheim van Delft	Maurits Binger	Annie Bos; Jan van Dommelen	Drama	
Gloria Transita	Johan Gildemeijer	August van den Hoeck		
Gouden Ketenen	Maurits Binger	Annie Bos; Cor Smits	Drama	
Madame Pinkette & Co	Maurits Binger	Annie Bos		
Ulbo Garvema	Maurits Binger	Frederick Vogeding; Cor Smits		
1918
Op hoop van zegen	Maurits Binger	Esther de Boer van Rijk; Jan van Dommelen	Fisherman's drama	First film of the theatrical play Op hoop van zegen
Toen 't licht verdween	Maurits Binger	Annie Bos; Adelqui Migliar	Drama	
Amerikaansche Meisjes	Maurits Binger	Margie Morris; Lola Cornero; Beppie de Vries		
De Kroon der Schande	Maurits Binger	Willem van der Veer; Annie Bos		
Pro Domo	Theo Frenkel sr.	Louis Bouwmeester	Drama	
Het Proces Begeer	Theo Frenkel	Jacques Sluyters		
Oorlog en Vrede	Maurits Binger	Annie Bos; Adelqui Migliar	Drama; War	
De Duivel	Theo Frenkel	Tonny Stevens	Drama	
1919
Zonnestraal	Theo Frenkel	Kees Lageman	Drama; Comedy	The film is lost
Zonnetje	Maurits Binger; B.E. Doxat-Pratt	Annie Bos		
Een Carmen van het Noorden	Maurits Binger; Hans Nesna	Annie Bos	Drama; Romance	
De Damescoupeur	Maurits Binger			
De Duivel in Amsterdam	Theo Frenkel	Eduard Verkade; Louis Bouwmeester; Margie Morris		
Op Stap door Amsterdam	Theo Frenkel	Piet Köhler		
Het Goudvischje	Maurits Binger	Jan van Dommelen		
