= Van Dommelen =

van Dommelen is a Dutch surname. Notable people with the surname include:

- Caroline van Dommelen (1874–1957), Dutch silent film actress
- Ed van Dommelen (1934–2021), Dutch politician
- Jan van Dommelen (1878–1942), Dutch silent era film actor
- Maria Scheepers van Dommelen (1892–1989), Belgian pianist and music educator
