= De vrouw Clasina =

1915 film

- Directed by: Maurits Binger
- Release date: 1915
- Country: Netherlands
- Language: Silent

De vrouw Clasina is a 1915 Dutch silent drama film directed by Maurits Binger.

== Cast ==
- Louis H. Chrispijn - Bargee
- Annie Bos - Bargee's Daughter
- Esther de Boer-van Rijk - Bargee's Wife
- Koba Kinsbergen - Bargee's Younger Daughter
- Jan van Dommelen
- Christine van Meeteren - as Christine Chrispijn-van Meteren
- Mathilde Kiehl
- Willem van der Veer
- Coen Hissink
- John Timrott
- Jan C. De Vos
- Willem Faassen
