= The Secret of Delft =

- Directed by: Maurits Binger; Louis Chrispijn sr
- Written by: Maurits Binger; M.Habee
- Produced by: Maurits Binger
- Distributed by: Filmfabriek Hollandia
- Release date: 14 January 1916
- Running time: 80 minutes
- Country: Netherlands
- Language: Silent
- Budget: ± ƒ 70.000

The Secret of Delft (Dutch: Het geheim van den vuurtoren) is a 1916 Dutch black and white silent crime film directed by Maurits Binger. The movie was also sold to France, where it was titled Le Secret du Phare. Only fragments of the original movie survived and are being kept in the Dutch Cinema Museum (Nederlands Filmuseum). It is hoped a complete copy survived in France.

The movie was an ambitious, large-scale project because it required the construction of a 20 metre high ruined lighthouse, and a 15 metre long pier of the coast of Zandvoort. These constructions meant high production costs, totaling a rumoured 50.000 to 70.000 gulden. The movie also starred the most famous actors in the Netherlands at that time.

== Plot ==
In a fit of rage, the main character Hendrik van Norden injures a man. His injuries are so severe, the man is no longer able to recognise Van Norden. There was a witness to the assault, named Van Oort, who blackmails Van Norden and his wife. If they pay him a large sum of money, he would not got to the police to give a statement. The Van Norden's decide to comply and give Van Oort the money. To obtain the money, they decide to rob someone. They hide in the ruins of a lighthouse before the robbery. However, the two feel guilty about their decision and commit suicide by jumping off the lighthouse.

== Cast ==
- Louis H. Chrispijn - Van der Meulen
- Coen Hissink - Van Oort
- Greta Gijswijt - Margaretha
- Willem van der Veer - Hendrik van Norden
- Esther de Boer-van Rijk - Mrs. van Norden
- Jan van Dommelen - Prof. Van der Velde
- Henny Schroeder - Mrs. van Maerle (as Henny van Merle)
- Annie Bos - Van der Meulens´ housekeeper
- Willem Faassen - Willem van der Meulen
- Christine van Meeteren - Mrs. van der Velde
- Jaap van der Poll - Fisherman
- Alex Benno - Smuggler
