= Liefdesstrijd =

1915 film

- Directed by: Maurits Binger
- Release date: 15 November 1915
- Country: Netherlands
- Language: Silent

Liefdesstrijd is a 1915 Dutch silent drama film directed by Maurits Binger.

== Cast ==
- Annie Bos ... Kate van Marlen
- Willem van der Veer ... Alfred van der Loo
- Florent La Roche Jr. ... Ruprecht van Halden
- Paula de Waart ... Kate's mother
- Martha Walden ... Alice
- Jan van Dommelen ... Tenant out for revenge
- Christine van Meeteren
- Louis H. Chrispijn
- Louis Bouwmeester ... Achthoven
- Fred Homann
