= Flore Levine-Cousyns =

Belgian pianist (1898–1989)

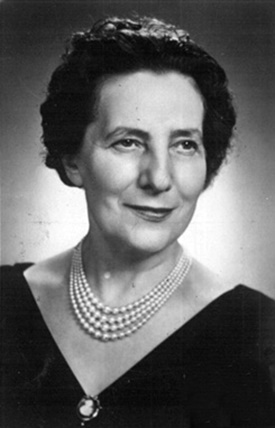
Flore Levine

Flore Levine-Cousyns (1898–1989) was a Belgian concert pianist, Professor of Piano at the Royal Conservatoire of Antwerp (1931–1964) and was appointed Chevalier de l'Ordre de la Couronne and Chevalier de l'Ordre de Léopold. She herself was a disciple of Émile Bosquet.

== Biography ==
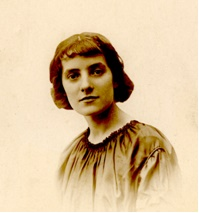
Flore Levine

Flore Levine was born in Antwerp in Belgium on December 6, 1898 and died in Antwerp on April 14, 1989. She studied at the Royal Conservatoire of Antwerp with Flor Alpaerts, August de Boeck (Harmony), Lodewijk Mortelmans (Contrepoint) and in the piano class of Émile Bosquet, for whom she kept a deep attachment for the rest of her life. In 1919, she obtained her Diplôme Supérieur de Piano with honors, for which she also performed the Concerto no. 1 in E Flat Major of Franz Liszt.

Having also a great interest in contemporary music, Flore Levine performed numerous Premieres (among others: Darius Milhaud). As a famous concert pianist, she also performed many recitals with another pianist, Mit Scapus - Van Dommelen (who was born in Antwerp in 1892 and died in Antwerp in 1989) in her later years. Flore Levine had also a personal and a professional relationship with the harpsichordist Wanda Landowska.

Flore Levine was appointed Professor of Piano at the Royal Conservatory of Music of Antwerp from 1931 to 1964. After this period, she continued to teach the piano for over 25 years in various Music Schools and with private lessons. As a well-known Professor, she taught several generations of pianists among which, Lucette Alleman (see Bibliography), who obtained Virtuosity Prize of the Belgium Government in 1958 and became Laureate of the Concours international d'exécution musicale de Genève that same year.

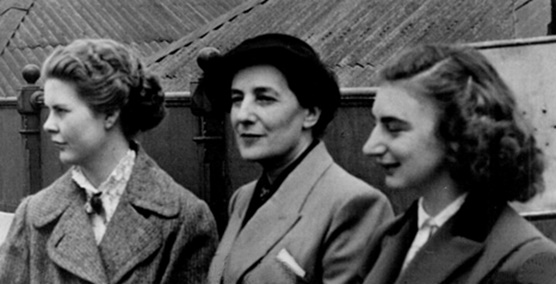
Flore Levine (in the center), with her students Godelieve Berger (left), Lucette Alleman (right)

As a professor and as a pedagogue, she was highly appreciated by her students, to whom she conveyed respect and her deep love for music. She investigated piano techniques; she was in the lineage of Karl Leimer, Walter Gieseking, Heinrich Neuhaus and Marie Jaëll.. The quality of the sound was essential and fundamental, based on a piano technique, using suppleness and a rebound technic from the keyboard, without ever 'forcing' the way of playing.

Professor Levine could listen better than anyone on earth. She possessed the art to express her observations and her critical comments about piano performance with a lot of precision, without ever hurting anyone and with a fine touch of humor. She taught the way of performing the music, by listening to the greatest pianists, adding her observations and her comments, while she was always looking for solutions to technical problems (she often tried out passages in different ways, searching and demonstrating them herself at the piano). All this was passed on with deep respect for the interpretation and for the opinion of each student. After each piano lesson, one would go home with a feeling of personal growth and enrichment, both on the musical and on the human side. Flore Levine's piano playing was shining through a deep generous, round and broad sound. A very erudite person, she devoted a passion for literature and for every other form of Art. She was also very interested in 'what would go on in the world'. Despite her venerable age, she always remained very lively and young in spirit." (Testimony by Godelieve Berger, student of Flore Levine. Gazet van Antwerpen, 1989).
