= Heilig recht =

1914 film

- Directed by: Louis H. Chrispijn
- Written by: Otto Zeegers (play)
- Release date: 3 September 1914
- Country: Netherlands
- Language: Silent

Heilig recht is a 1914 Dutch silent drama film directed by Louis H. Chrispijn.

== Cast ==
- Annie Bos - Leida van Galen
- Louis Bouwmeester - Arie van Galen
- Esther de Boer-van Rijk - Koos
- Louis Chrispijn Jr. - Max de Nessel
- Koba Kinsbergen - Leida's younger sister
- Lau Ezerma
- Mientje Kling - Extra
- Jan van Dommelen
- Barend Barendse
- Louis H. Chrispijn
- Willem van der Veer
- Fred Homann
