= Mooi Juultje van Volendam =

1924 film

- Directed by: Alex Benno
- Written by: Jan Lemaire sr.
- Release date: 10 October 1924
- Running time: 70 minutes
- Country: Netherlands
- Language: Silent

Mooi Juultje van Volendam is a 1924 Dutch silent film directed by Alex Benno.

== Cast ==
- Annie Bos - Juultje
- August Van den Hoeck - Barendse
- Remi Rasquin - Meesen
- Jan Kiveron - Sander
- Pierre Balledux - Piet
- Frans Boogaers - Rekveld
- Jetje Cabanier - (as Henriette Cabanier)
- Johan Elsensohn - Toon
- Piet Fuchs - Meesens boekhouder
- Annie Metman-Slinger
- Arthur Sprenger - Meesens boekhouder
- Willem van der Veer - Willem
- Marie Verstraete - Trees Barendse
