= Op Hoop van Zegen =

Op hoop van Zegen may refer to:

- The Good Hope (play) (Dutch: Op hoop van Zegen), a Dutch play by Herman Heijermans
  - Op hoop van zegen (1918 film), a Dutch silent drama film, based on the play
  - Op hoop van zegen (1924 film), a Dutch silent drama film, based on the play
  - Op hoop van zegen (1934 film), a Dutch drama film, based on the play
  - Op hoop van zegen (1986 film) a Dutch drama film, based on the play
