= Diamant (film) =

- Directed by: Johan Gildemeijer
- Release date: 25 February 1916
- Country: Netherlands
- Language: Silent

Diamant is a 1916 Dutch silent film directed by Johan Gildemeijer.

== Cast ==
- Louis Bouwmeester - Mozes
- Esther de Boer-van Rijk - Mozes' wife
- Meina Irwen - foster child
- August Van den Hoeck - Biological father of the foster child
- Theo Van Vliet
- Jozef Orelio
