= Fatal Woman =

Fatal Woman may refer to:

- the concept of the "femme fatale"
- The Fatal Woman, a 1915 Dutch film
- an alternate title for Femme Fatale, a 1991 film
- Norine Fournier Lattimore, professionally known as "Dolores", also referred to as the "Fatal Woman of the London Studios"
- "The Fatal Woman: Three Tales", a 1974 work by John Glassco
- a 1952 novel by Patrick Quentin also published under the title "Black Widow"
