= Ko Rentmeester =

Ko Rentmeester may refer to:

- Co Rentmeester (Jacobus Willem Rentmeester; born 1936), Dutch rower and photojournalist
- Ko Rentmeester (actor) (Jakobus Johannes Rentmeester; 1865–1942) Dutch actor, singer and director, played e.g. in the 1926 comedy film Moderne landhaaien
