= Rentmeester =

Rentmeester is a surname. Notable people with the surname include:

- Bill Rentmeester (born 1986), American football fullback
- Jacobus Rentmeester (born 1936), nicknamed "Co" or "Ko", Dutch rower and photojournalist
- Jakobus Rentmeester (1865–1942), known professionally as Ko Rentmeester, Dutch actor in the film Moderne landhaaien
