= Op Hoop van Zegen (1918 film) =

Op hoop van zegen
- Directed by: Maurits Binger
- Written by: Maurits Binger; Herman Heijermans (play)
- Produced by: Maurits Binger
- Release date: 21 October 1918
- Running time: 60 minutes
- Country: Netherlands
- Language: Silent

Op hoop van zegen (meaning Here's to Hoping or In the Hope of Blessing; also known as The Good Hope) is a 1918 Dutch silent drama film directed by Maurits Binger.

Starring Esther de Boer-van Rijk, the film was based on a notable social drama play of the same name by Herman Heijermans, which was first published in 1900. It is about the effects of a scuttling of a ship for claiming its insurance money and the devastating effect this has on the small fishing village and mother of two of the sailors.

Well-received, it had been cited as the best Dutch film up until that moment in time.

== Plot ==
The widow Kniertje sends her two remaining sons Geert and Barend to sea again. This is against her better judgment, as she lost her husband and two sons at the sea before. When the ship Hoop (Hope) sinks in a storm as part of an insurance scam and the men have not returned, Kniertje can only find comfort in Geert's friend Jo.

== Cast ==
- Esther de Boer-van Rijk - Kniertje
- Annie Bos - Jo
- Willem van der Veer - Geert
- Frits Bouwmeester - Barend
- Jan van Dommelen - Reder Bos
- Antoinette Gerritsen - Clementine Bos
- Willem Hunsche - Simon
- Jeanne Van der Pers - Marietje
- Theo Frenkel Jr. - Mees
- Paula de Waart - Truus
- Jan Grader - Boekhouder Kaps

== Reception ==
The role of Jo, played by Annie Bos, has been described as one of the best performances of the Dutch actress. The film itself is said to have been considered the best Dutch film until then at the time.

The film was remade in 1924, in a German co-production.
