= Het geheim van het slot arco =

1915 film

Het geheim van het slot Arco
- Directed by: Maurits Binger and Jan van Dommelen
- Release date: 1915
- Country: Netherlands
- Language: Silent

Het geheim van het slot Arco is a 1915 Dutch silent drama film horror directed by Maurits Binger and Jan van Dommelen.

The English title is: The secret of castle Arco, the film consist of a Dutch cast while the production site was shot in Austria. The film is considered missing.

The storyline is about a man without a head that haunts the castle Arco in the 16th century. A man in the present day (1914) goes to the castle to find out if the story is true after which he finds something strange beneath the old castle floor.

== Cast ==
- Jan van Dommelen
- Tilly Lus
- Willem van der Veer
- Constant van Kerckhoven jr
- Co Balfoort
- Louis van Dommelen
- Caroline van Dommelen
