= The Trouble With Money =

Komedie om Geld
- Directed by: Max Ophüls
- Written by: Alex de Haas (writer), Christine van Meeteren (dialogue)
- Produced by: Will Tuschinski
- Release date: 30 October 1936
- Country: Netherlands
- Language: Dutch

The Trouble With Money or Komedie om Geld is a 1936 Dutch comedy film directed by Max Ophüls. Producer was Will Tuschinski, son of Abraham Tuschinski. It was released on DVD in 2008.

At the time, the film was the most expensive production ever to have been made in the Netherlands costing around 150,000 guilders. On its initial release, it only took around 10,000 guilders at the box office.

== Cast ==
- Herman Bouber ... Karel Brand
- Matthieu van Eysden ... Ferdinand
- Rini Otte ... Willy, Daughter of Brand
- Cor Ruys ... Moorman
- Edwin Gubbins Doorenbos ... Verteller (voice)
- Lau Ezerman
- Arend Sandhouse
- Richard Flinck
- Corry Vonk
- Bert van Dongen
- Gerard Doting
- Gerard Hartkamp
- Christine van Meeteren

== Bibliography ==
- Mathijs, Ernest. The Cinema of the Low Countries. Wallflower Press, 2004.
