= Ontmaskerd =

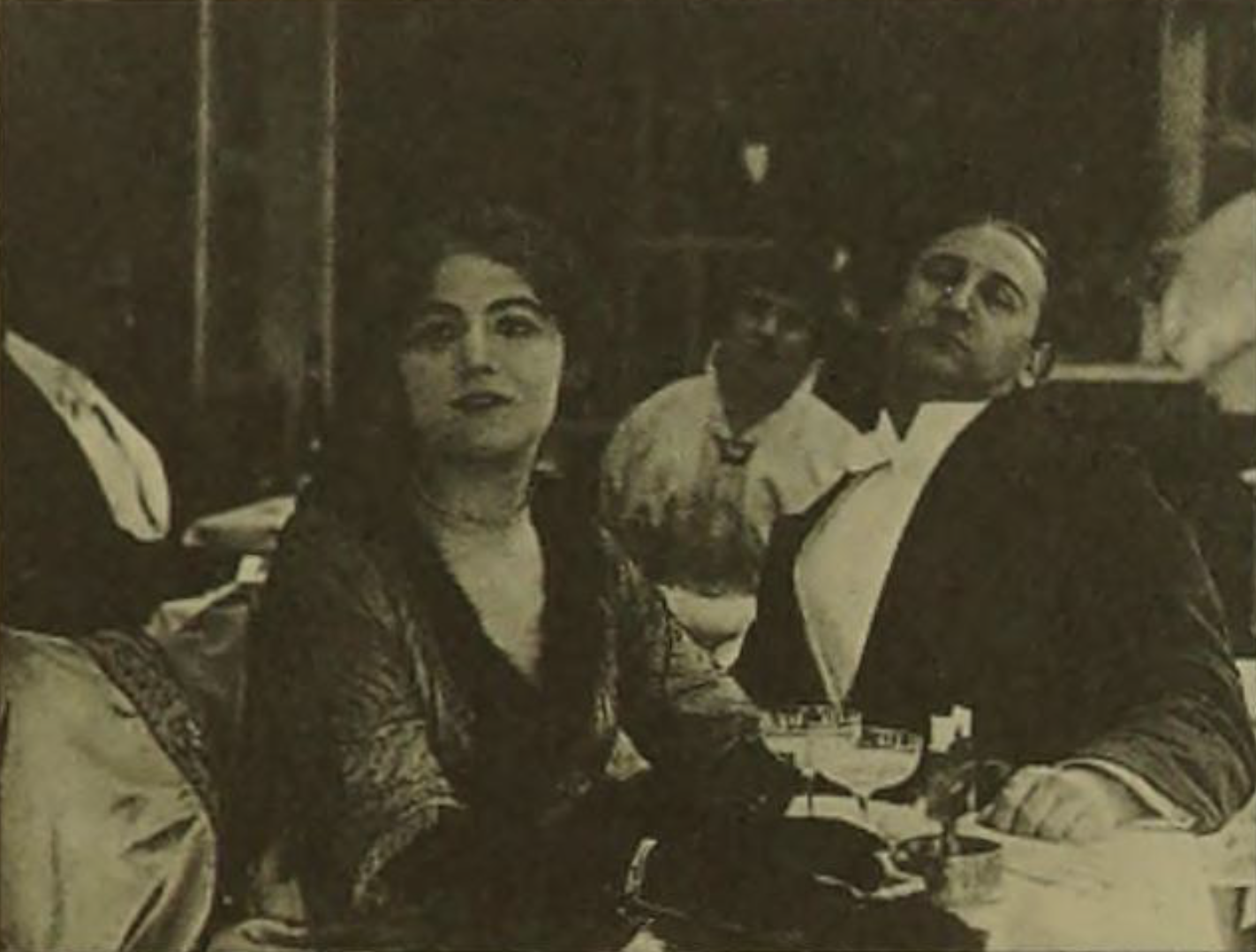
- Directed by: Mime Misu
- Distributed by: Filmfabriek Hollandia
- Release date: 1915
- Country: Netherlands
- Language: Silent

Ontmaskerd (English, Unmasked) is a 1915 Dutch silent drama film directed by Mime Misu. The original title was De Wereld (The World). The art direction was by Ernst Leijden (sets).

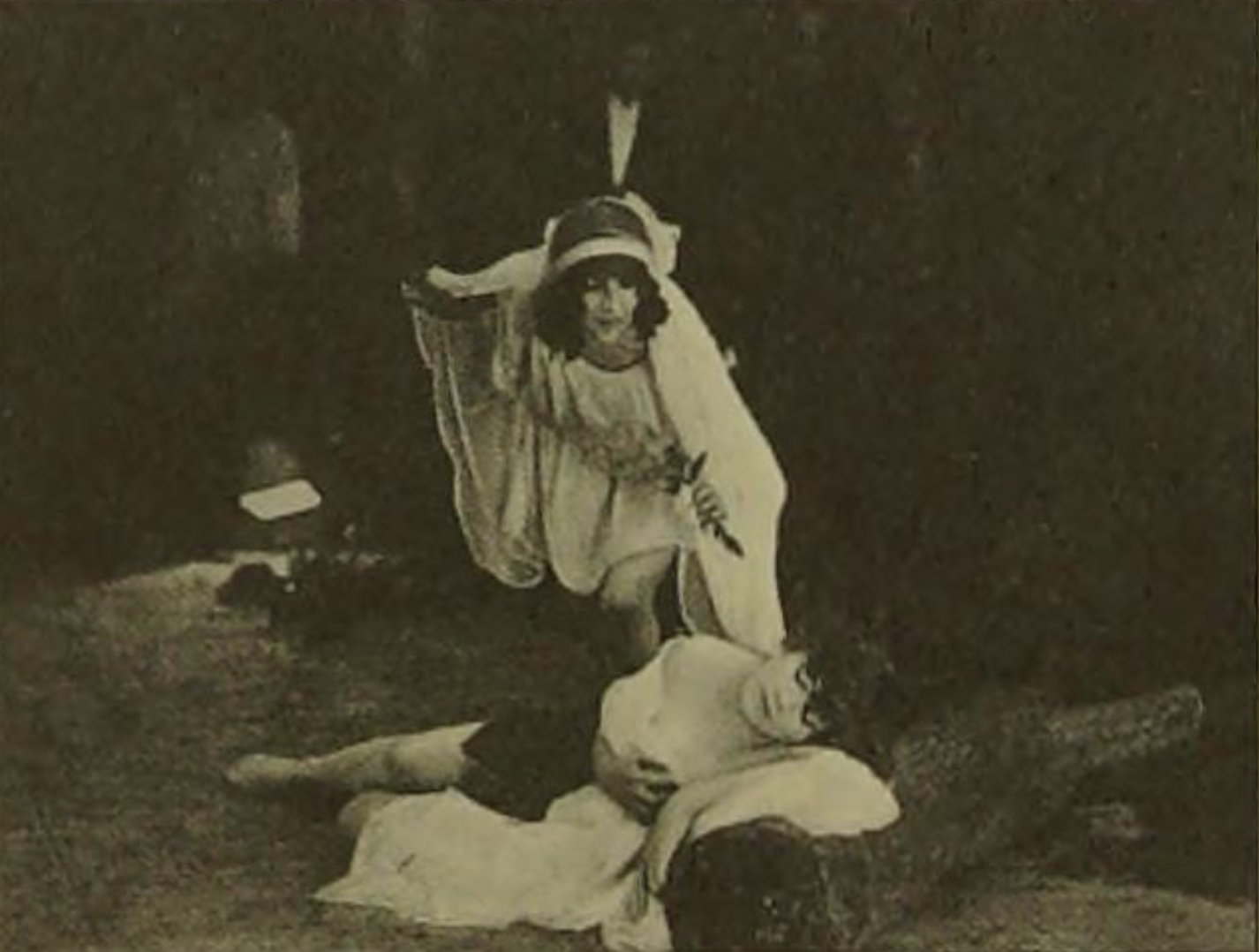

== Plot ==
This plot summary comes from the book Of Joy and Sorrow: A Filmography of Dutch Silent Fiction:

Baron Arion de Courmont loves his mother's lady companion. Viola, believing that his mother will never consent to their marriage, sends him a letter explaining why she must leave the house. After reading the letter, the mother agrees to the marriage on one condition: her son must go to the United States for a year. If his feelings are the same after he returns, he may marry Viola. On the ship to New York, Arion makes friends with Henri d'Alba, who was sent abroad by his family because of his fraudulent practices. At midnight an explosion in the engine room causes the ship to sink. Henri manages to cling to the wreck, but he sees Arion vanish in the waves. Searching for food, Henri comes across Arion's documents and chequebook. The next day he is rescued by a passing ship. Believing that Arion has drowned, Henri decides to assume his identity and live a life of luxury as Baron de Courmont. He meets and marries a dancer, Marfa Darbet, much to the displeasure of Bob, her impresario and lover. One day, in a fight, Bob seriously injures Henri, who dies of his wounds. The lovers flee to Europe. Meanwhile, Arion, whose name was on the list of shipwreck victims, has been picked up by a fishing boat and taken to hospital, where, unidentified, he lies seriously ill for many months. When he recovers, news of his mother's death reaches him. Arion returns to Europe where he eventually finds Viola. They set a date for their wedding. Bob and Marfa read the announcement of the wedding of Baron Arion de Courmont, a survivor of the shipwrecked Batavia. Thinking that Arion must be an impostor, they decide to blackmail him. The letter they send him is handed to the police. When detectives arrive to arrest Bob and Marfa, they flee to the office of a friend who hides them in the basement. In their haste to escape, they upset a lamp that explodes. The fire reaches a petrol storage place and the basement becomes their grave.

== Cast ==
- Annie Bos as Marfa Darbet
- Jack Hamel as Henri d'Alba
- Johannes Langenake as Bob
- Emmy Arbous as Viola Sergine
- Coen Hissink as Theatre Agent
- John Timrott
- Jan van Dommelen
- Eugenie Krix
- Jan Holtrop
- Rienk Brouwer as Policeman
- Carl Kuehn
- Alex Benno
- M.F. Heemskerk as a clerk
- Ernst Leijden as a detective
