= Roze Kate =

- Directed by: Oscar Tourniaire
- Written by: Nestor de Tière (play)
- Release date: 6 April 1912
- Country: Netherlands
- Language: Silent

Roze Kate is a 1912 Dutch silent drama film thriller directed by Oscar Tourniaire.

== Plot ==
Roze Kate is in love with a boy named Everhard. However, Everhard's brothers Jacob and Simon are jealous of him. When they discover their heritage will be lost when their mother dies, they decide to kill Roze Kate.

== Cast ==
- Caroline van Dommelen ... Roze Kate
- Louis van Dommelen ... Everhard
- Jan van Dommelen
- Jef Mertens
- Ansje van Dommelen-Kapper
- Anton Roemer
- Oscar Tourniaire
