= De bannelingen =

1911 film

De Bannelingen
- Directed by: Léon Boedels and Caroline van Dommelen
- Written by: Caroline van Dommelen (writer)
- Based on: Vera; or, The Nihilists
- Produced by: Film-Fabriek F.A
- Release date: 9 December 1911
- Running time: 50 minutes
- Country: Netherlands
- Language: Silent

De Bannelingen (The Exiles) is a 1911 Dutch silent drama film directed by Léon Boedels and Caroline van Dommelen. It was Caroline van Dommelen's first film. It was an adaptation of the play Vera; or, The Nihilists by Oscar Wilde

== Plot ==
In the 19th century a group of nihilists wants to improve the horrible conditions for prisoners in Russia during the Tsar's reign.

== Cast ==
- Caroline van Dommelen ... Alexandra Iwanovna Medjanof
- Cato Mertens-de Jaeger ... Warwara Bogodouchow
- Louis van Dommelen ... Boris Netchaeieff
- Jef Mertens ... colonel Rimski Korsafoff G. Retniensky
- Oscar Tourniaire ... Governor of Prison
- Jan van Dommelen
- Jan Buderman
- Anton Roemer
- Manus Hulsman
- Wim Grelinger
- Jopie Tourniaire
- Ansje van Dommelen-Kapper
- Kees Lageman
- Tilly Lus
- Piet Fuchs

== Reception ==
The Algemeen Handelsblad reviewed the film positively stating: "The shots are very varied and offer everything that belongs to the cinema: beautiful nature scenes with the necessary action, refined interiors, and… most importantly, fine acting that comes out well”"
