= Willem van der Veer =

Dutch actor (1887–1960)

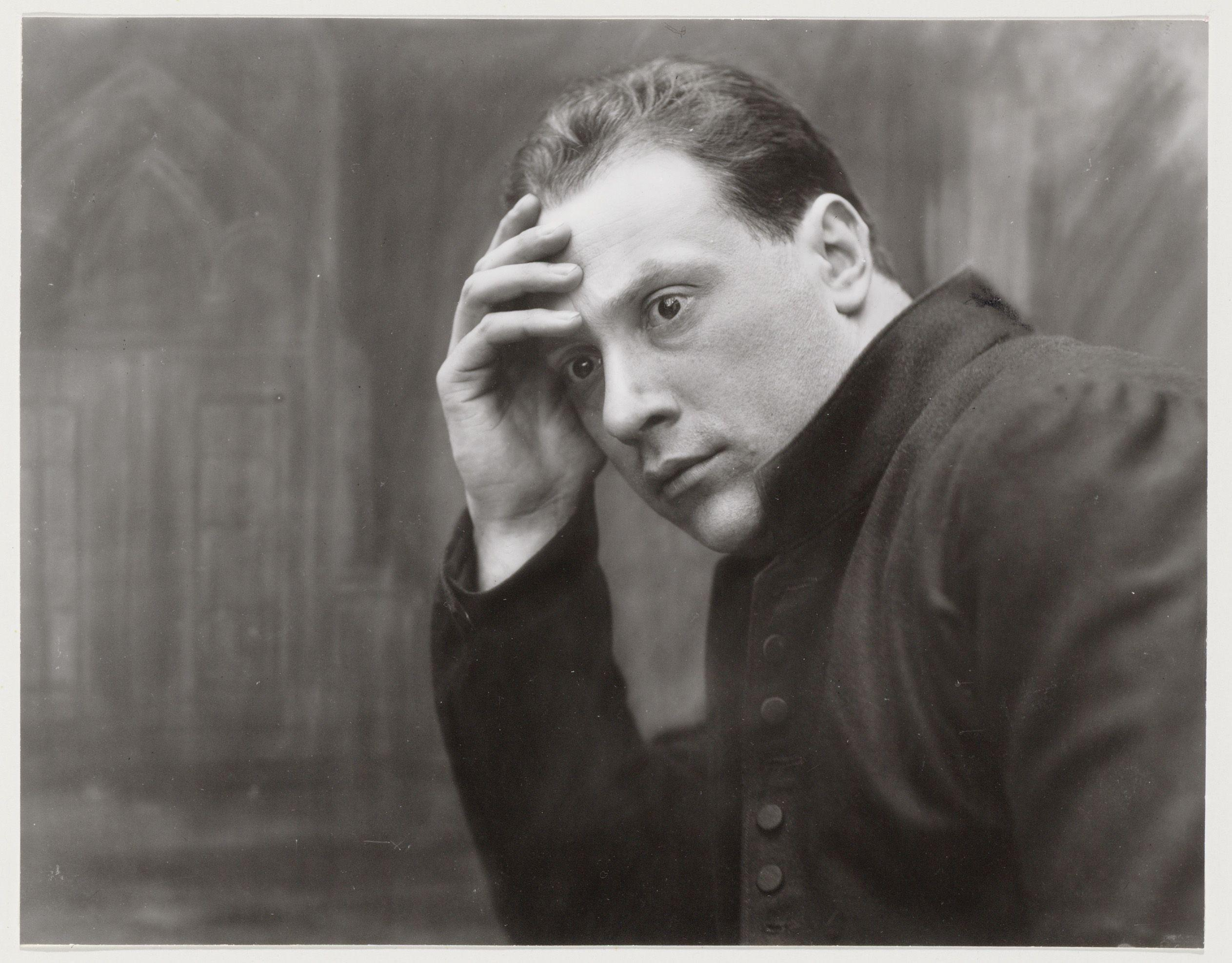
- Born: Wilhelmus Leonardus Joseph van der Veer; 26 May 1887; Eindhoven, Netherlands
- Died: 21 June 1960 (aged 73); Haarlem, Netherlands
- Occupation: Actor
- Years active: 1913–1937

Willem van der Veer (26 May 1887 – 21 June 1960) was a Dutch film actor of the silent era. He appeared in 32 films between 1913 and 1937.

== Filmography ==
- De man zonder hart (1937)
- Op hoop van zegen (1934)
- Het meisje met den blauwen hoed (1934)
- Die vom Schicksal Verfolgten (1926)
- Mooi Juultje van Volendam (1924)
- Amsterdam bij nacht (1924)
- The Lion's Mouse (1923)
- Bulldog Drummond (1922)
- De bruut (1922)
- Menschenwee (1921)
- Oorlog en vrede - 1918 (1918)
- Op hoop van zegen (1918)
- Oorlog en vrede - 1916 (1918)
- Oorlog en vrede - 1914 (1918)
- De kroon der schande (1918)
- Gouden ketenen (1917)
- Het geheim van Delft (1917)
- La renzoni (1916)
- Majoor Frans (1916)
- Liefdesoffer (1916)
- Vogelvrij (1916)
- Het geheim van den vuurtoren (1916)
- Liefdesstrijd (1915)
- De vrouw Clasina (1915)
- Het geheim van het slot arco (1915)
- De vloek van het testament (1915)
- Luchtkastelen (1914)
- Heilig recht (1914)
- Liefde waakt (1914)
- Een telegram uit Mexico (1914)
- Silvia Silombra (1913)
- Don Juan (1913)
