= Weergevonden =

1914 film

- Directed by: Louis H. Chrispijn
- Release date: 1914
- Running time: 45 minutes
- Country: Netherlands
- Language: Silent

Weergevonden is a 1914 Dutch silent film directed by Louis H. Chrispijn. It was the first film produced by Hollandia Studios and one of the first Dutch feature films.

== Cast ==
- Louis H. Chrispijn ... Vader / Father
- Enny de Leeuwe ... Lea
- Jan van Dommelen ... Niet-joodse dokter / Non-Jewish doctor
- Eugenie Krix ... Moeder van de doker / Doctor's mother / Deftige dame in restaurant
- Alex Benno ... Rabbijn / Rabbi
- Annie Bos ... Boerin / Farmer's wife / Vrouw in restaurant / Woman in restaurant
- Christine van Meeteren ... Buurvrouw / Neighbour
- Louis van Dommelen
- Ansje van Dommelen-Kapper
- Lau Ezerman
- Theo Frenkel Jr.
- Koba Kinsbergen
- Feiko Boersma
- Charles Gilhuys
