= Schakels =

1920 film

- Directed by: Maurits Binger
- Produced by: Maurits Binger
- Narrated by: Herman Heijermans (original play), Maurits Binger (script)
- Distributed by: Filmfabriek Hollandia
- Release date: 1920
- Running time: 50 minutes
- Country: Netherlands
- Language: Silent
- Budget: unknown

Schakels ("Connections") is a 1920 Dutch silent film directed by Maurits Binger and based on a play by Dutch playwright Herman Heijermans. The original movie and all copies are lost.

== Cast ==
- Jan van Dommelen - Pancras Duif
- Adelqui Migliar - Henk Duif
- Annie Bos - Marianne
- Paula de Waart - Pancras' wife
- Frits Bouwmeester - Toontje
- Jeanne Van der Pers - Toontje's girlfriend
- Louis Davids - estate agent Jan Duif
- Henny Van Merle - Jan Duif's wife
- Coen Hissink
- Renee Spiljar - Marianne's son
- Alex Benno - Ragman
- Yard Van Staalduynen - Psychiatrist
