= Luchtkastelen =

1914 film

- Directed by: Louis H. Chrispijn
- Release date: 14 September 1914
- Running time: 60 minutes
- Country: Netherlands
- Language: Silent

Luchtkastelen is a 1914 Dutch silent drama film directed by Louis H. Chrispijn.

== Cast ==
- Willem van der Veer ... Jack
- Annie Bos ... Alice Stanton
- Jan van Dommelen ... Visser / Fisherman
- Theo Frenkel
- Eugenie Krix ... Mevrouw Stanton / Mrs. Stanton
- Koba Kinsbergen
- Alex Benno
- Fred Homann ... Visser / Fisherman
