= Toffe jongens onder de mobilisatie =

Toffe Jongens onder de Mobilisatie
- Directed by: Jan van Dommelen
- Release date: 16 October 1914
- Country: Netherlands
- Language: Silent

Toffe Jongens onder de Mobilisatie is a 1914 Dutch silent comedy film directed by Jan van Dommelen.

== Cast ==
- Annie Bos ... Adèle
- Louis van Dommelen ... Baron / Baron
- Nelly De Heer ... Directrice / Manager
- Sien De la Mar-Kloppers ... Angèle (as Sien Klopper)
- Roosje Ménagé-Challa ... Vriendin van Adèle / Friend of Adèle
- Catharina Kinsbergen-Rentmeester
- Jan van Dommelen ... Vader van Adèle / Adèles father
- Alex Benno ... Kapitein / Captain
- Christine van Meeteren
