= The Secret of Delft (1917 film) =

Het geheim van Delft/The secret of Delft
- Directed by: Maurits Binger
- Produced by: Maurits Binger
- Cinematography: H. W. Metman
- Distributed by: Hollandia
- Release date: 20 February 1917
- Running time: 70 minutes
- Country: Netherlands
- Language: Silent
- Budget: 8000 gulden

Het geheim van Delft (The secret of Delft) is a 1917 Dutch silent drama film directed by Maurits Binger. Most of the filming took place in Haarlem, and not in Delft.

== Storyline ==
Annie and Lilly Vogels are the young daughters of Jan, a specialist in Delft pottery, working as a manager in a porcelain factory. Van Haaften is the owner and executive of the factory. While father Jan is working on an improved procedure for making porcelain, his daughter Lilly is very busy running the household. Her older sister Annie does not contribute as much to the household work because she focuses more on her music and her relationship with Leo, Van Haaften's son. Meanwhile, cousin Willem Berg receives a strong reprimand due to his carelessness while working at the factory.

Because of differences in social class, Annie and Leo have to keep their relationship an absolute secret. They are caught in the act by Leo's mother, she dismisses Annie immediately. When the head of the rich family is informed, he wants to prevent a scandal and sends Leo away for an indefinite period to America. Right before he leaves, Leo secretly agrees on meeting Annie and breaks off their relationship. Annie returns home broken hearted to get all her belongings and leave her home for good.

Six months go by very slowly. Jan's research on the new procedure for painting porcelain seems fruitless. To pay the rent, Lilly has started work as a florist. Meanwhile, Annie also has some financial trouble. She starts work as a pianist in a nightclub to pay for her expensive piano lessons she has been following. Lilly pays her a visit and reveals to Annie their father is on the verge of discovering the secret to the old Delftware glaze. Fraudulent cousin Willem overhears them talking about this and starts thinking up evil plans. He confronts Jan with this knowledge but to no avail, as his experiment fell through due to financial shortcomings. Lilly cannot stand her father's hardship any longer and goes to see Minny, the daughter of the Van Haaften's, to ask for money to finally be able to realise the procedure her father has conceived (the expensive ingredient platina is required to carry out this procedure with success). However, her visit to Van Haaften is not a success, the director also has financial troubles.

At one point, Annie is discovered in the night club by an impresario and is offered a contract for a tour of concerts. Meanwhile, Leo returns from America and asks his father permission to see Annie again. Jan asks Van Haaften for a loan, but Vaan Haaften deems his experiments as silly and fires him. Jan almost wants to give up, when in the park he stumbles on the fortune of a dead man who has committed suicide. The included letter states 'finders keepers'. From this money, he can finally buy platina and continue his experiments. In the meantime, Van Haaften's factory has gone out of business. Van Haaften cannot cope with this setback and during the night he commits suicide in his office.

During the same night, cousin Willem has broken into the factory in a bid to find out more about the secret of Delft. He sees the lifeless body of Van Haaften, but does not raise the alarm. Instead, he takes the remaining 3,000 gulden belonging to the factory which he finds in Van Haaften's pockets and he also pinches his suicide note. The next morning Jan finds the body. He calls in for help, but the police now suspect him of committing murder. He is considered to be the main suspect because he has a lot of money on his person and a some money went missing at the factory, and is arrested. Right before being taken to the police station, he hands over the secret Delft formula to his daughter Lilly.

Some time later Leo Van Haaften has taken over his father's position. In place of Jan, fraudulent cousin Willem is hired as the new factory manager and is still trying to find out the Delft secret. He discovers that Annie is now the owner of the formula and tries to persuade her to give him the formula, but she is more concerned with her and Leo's relationship. They would love to get married but are not allowed to as her father is in prison. In the ensuing trial, Jan is charged with the murder of Van Haaften with a demanded sentence of 20 years imprisonment. Eventually he is found guilty and sentenced to ten years imprisonment.

In the meantime, Willem uses force to try and get his hands on the formula. He repeatedly pesters Lily, but she learns the formula by heart and burns the paper on which it is written. The situation gets out of hand and her house burns down to the ground. She finds new accommodation at her sister Annie's house, but is still being harassed by Willem. She writes a mock formula and makes sure that he finds this fake copy. Willem struggles with the experiments, meanwhile Lily's father gives her the task to find the letter written by the person who had committed suicide in the park. After searching for a long time, she finds it and takes the new evidence to the judge.

Willem ultimately realises that the formula is a fake and starts bothering Annie again. He knows she is in possession of the rewritten draft of the formula and confronts her. Annie refuses to give it to him and runs. The situation escalates into a chase where Annie escapes by standing on the turning sails of a windmill. She is saved by bystanders and is escorted to the Van Haaften's estate. Meanwhile the suicide note of the father has been found in the estate. At the end of the movie Jan is cleared of all charges; he gets his job back at the factory and is finally able to complete his experiments to achieve the pottery with a special gleam. Cousin Willem is arrested and in spite of all that has happened, Leo and Annie get married.

== Cast ==
- Annie Bos - Annie Vogel
- Lily Bouwmeester - Lilly Vogel
- Jan van Dommelen - Jan Vogel
- Willem van der Veer - Willem Berg
- Louis H. Chrispijn - Van Haaften
- Frederick Vogeding - Leo van Haaften
- Paula de Waart - Mevrouw Van Haaften
- Minny Erfmann - Minny van Haaften

== Trivia ==
Four scenes of the movie have been recovered and finished, the movie was relaunched on 27 September 1995 at the Filmfestival of Utrecht with music by Henny Vrienten. One 12-minute scene is still missing to this day. The movie is also available on DVD, albeit in a limited edition.
