= Christine van Meeteren =

Dutch actress (1885–1973)

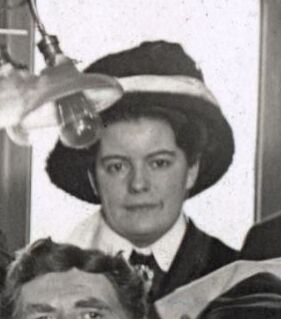
- Born: 26 April 1885; Amsterdam, Netherlands
- Died: 3 January 1973 (aged 87); Hoog-Keppel, Netherlands
- Occupation: Actress
- Years active: 1913–1936

Christine van Meeteren (26 April 1885 – 3 January 1973) was a Dutch film actress of the silent era. She appeared in 17 films between 1913 and 1936.

== Filmography ==
- Komedie om geld (1936)
- Majoor Frans (1916)
- Het geheim van den vuurtoren (1916)
- Liefdesstrijd (1915)
- De vrouw Clasina (1915)
- De vloek van het testament (1915)
- Toffe jongens onder de mobilisatie (1914)
- Weergevonden (1914)
- De bloemen, die de ziel vertroosten (1914)
- Liefde waakt (1914)
- Een telegram uit Mexico (1914)
- De zigeunerin (1914)
- Zijn viool (1914)
- Krates (1913)
- Silvia Silombra (1913)
- Nederland en Oranje (1913)
- Mijntje en Trijntje (1913)
