= Majoor Frans =

1916 film

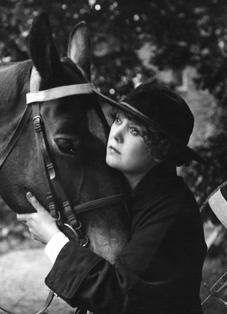
- Annie Bos in Majoor Frans
- Directed by: Maurits Binger
- Release date: 1916
- Country: Netherlands
- Language: Silent

Majoor Frans is a 1916 Dutch silent drama film directed by Maurits Binger.

== Plot ==
Wealthy John von Zwenken (Louis H. Chrispijn) lives with his daughter and son-in-law in a castle named De Werve. One day, he returns from hunting and is informed that a new child has been welcomed in the family. Disappointed and ashamed that the child is a girl, John introduces her to his friends and staff as a boy. Shortly after the delivery, the mother dies and the baby is left in John's hands. Twelve years later, young Frans (Lily Bouwmeester) lives an unusual life, having been raised as a boy by John and sgt. Rolf (Willem Hunsche). Her nanny's (Paula de Waart) attempts to teach her how to be a girl have been unsuccessful.

Meanwhile, the Colonel receives a visit from his son Rudolf (Willem van der Veer), who has been living a joyful but expensive student life in Leiden). Rudolf promises to better his life, but is quickly lured back in Leiden's nightlife. All of this happens during Frans' birthday. With her grandfather absent due to a business travel, her wish is to invite aunt Roselaar (Maria Bouwmeester-Clermont), who has not been on speaking terms with John for years, due to a huge debt. She has now been paying the money back by supporting Frans' education, and is thus shocked to find out that Frans is a girl. Because a girl requires less education money, Roselaar feels betrayed and leaves angrily.

As a consequence, Frans (now Annie Bos) is sent to a boarding school, where she spends her years showing rebellious behavior against her superiors. She is expelled when she one day rides a horse spontaneously, but shows no remorse and returns to De Werve. After a warm welcome, she finds out that her grandfather is no longer able to afford the castle, so she proposes to raise money by organizing a fox hunt. When this proves unsuccessful, she turns to her uncle Rudolf for help, though he responds by leaving to join the army. A terrible soldier, Rudolf deserts the army, but is caught and jailed. A De Werve member has been condemned a scandal, so Frans makes it her goal to help him escape, on condition that he passes the border and never returns to the Netherlands again.

Following, Rolf has inherited a fortune and uses the money to co-support De Werve by moving in. Simultaneously, Frans meets Roselaar's cousin Leopold van Zonshoven (Frederick Vogeding). Leo - who was granted the fortune meant for Frans - has been sent to De Werve by Roselaar to court Frans. Frans has never experienced love, though she feels immediately attracted to Leo. However, his attempts to financially support the family does not please her, for as her pride does not allow her to accept money from outsiders. In the heat of anger, she fights Leo and accidentally slashes him.

Frans feels guilty and makes up with him, and accepts when Leo proposes to her. However, when she misinterprets that Leo will inherit all of Roselaar's money while the Von Zwenkens remain ignored, she becomes furious, until finding out that her grandfather has died of old age. Despite the financial situation, she buries him with military honor. Assuming that she will lose De Werve, Frans abandons the castle and explores the world, still filled with grief. She eventually finds work at a circus, where she runs into Rudolf as her colleague. When Rolf hears about this, he feels ashamed and begs Leo to do something about it. Leo, who has bought De Werve, will be traveling for a few years and offers Frans to live in the castle during his absence. There, she finds out that the Von Zwenkens are indeed included in Roselaar's fortune, and she sets out to find Leo and apologize to him. They eventually kiss and start a life together.

== Cast ==
- Annie Bos as Francis Mordaunt alias Majoor Frans
- Frederick Vogeding as Leopold 'Leo' van Zonshoven
- Lily Bouwmeester as Young Francis Mordaunt
- Willem van der Veer as Rudolf von Zwenken
- Louis H. Chrispijn as John von Zwenken
- Willem Hunsche as Rolf
- Paula de Waart as Nanny
- Christine van Meeteren as Coachman's widow
- Maria Bouwmeester-Clermont as Aunt Roselaar
- Minny Erfmann
- Nola Hatterman
- Jan van Dommelen as Colonel
- Alex Benno
- Lola Cornero
- Ernst Winar
