= The Living Ladder =

- Directed by: Maurits Binger and Louis H. Chrispijn
- Written by: Maurits Binger
- Release date: 24 January 1913
- Running time: 50 minutes
- Country: Netherlands
- Language: Silent

The Living Ladder (Dutch: De Levende Ladder) is a 1913 Dutch silent drama film directed by Maurits Binger and Louis H. Chrispijn. It was the first feature film from the Netherlands.

== Plot ==
In a small Dutch village, Annie is treated by her parents to a circus performance in honor of her birthday. When he sees Annie, the clown Janus (Pedro in the English version) falls in love with her and gives her a message. Annie writes back that she will see him gladly if her father agrees, but her father forbids any romance with a clown. The circus leaves the village.

Several months later, Annie's father takes her to her aunt's village, hoping it will make her forget the clown. By coincidence, Janus' circus comes to perform in the same village. One night, a fire breaks out in the mill of Annie's Aunt, and the whole village, including the circus performers, rush to help. Annie is trapped at the top of the mill and the fire brigade's ladder proves too short. The circus clowns form a 'living ladder' by climbing on each other's shoulders and Janus is able to save Annie. Her father finally accepts their love.

== Cast ==
Annie Bos and Alex Benno

- Annie Bos as Annie
- Alex Benno as Janus Blanus
- Koba Kinsbergen as Annie's sister
- Barend Barendse as Annie's father
- Louis Bouwmeester as a clown

== Preservation ==
The original 50 minute version is considered lost. Only a 25 minute tinted English version, titled The Burning Mill is available.
