= Liefde waakt =

1914 film

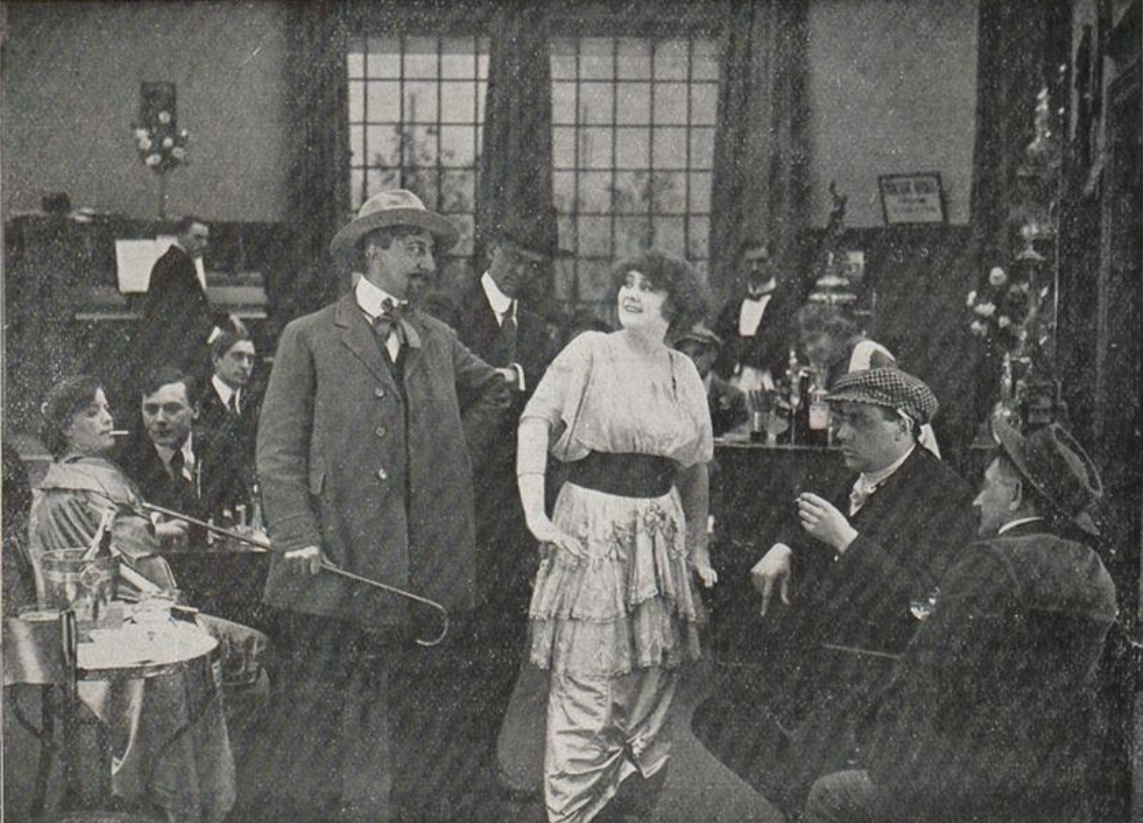
- Directed by: Louis H. Chrispijn
- Written by: Simon Maris (scenario)
- Production company: Filmfabriek Hollandia
- Distributed by: Filmverhuurkantoor Union
- Release date: 3 July 1914
- Running time: 2 reels
- Country: Netherlands
- Languages: Silent; Dutch intertitles

Liefde waakt is a 1914 Dutch silent Western film directed by Louis H. Chrispijn.

== Cast ==
- Annie Bos as Jennie
- Willem van der Veer
- Christine van Meeteren
- Jan van Dommelen as Painter
- Jan Holtrop as Gang leader, Jennie's father
- Mientje Kling as Extra
- Alex Benno as Policeman
- Emile Timrott
- Marius Spree
