= August de Boeck =

Flemish composer, organist and music pedagogue (1865-1937)

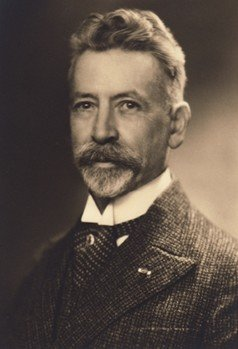
August de Boeck (August 1, 1920)

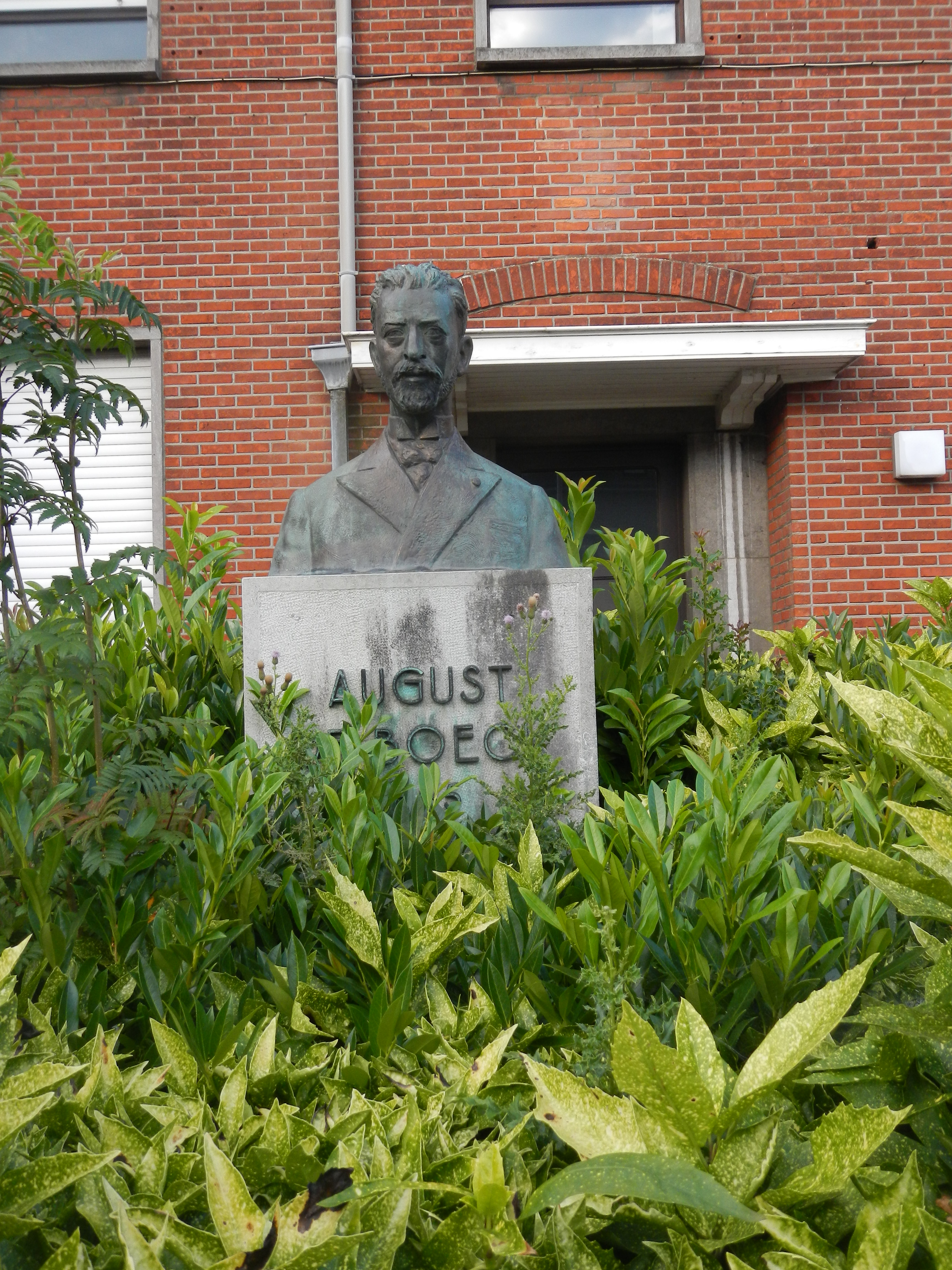
Bus of August De Boeck

Julianus Marie August De Boeck (May 9, 1865 in Merchtem, Belgium – October 9, 1937 in Merchtem) was a Belgian composer, organist and music pedagogue. He was the son of organist and director Florentinus (Flor) De Boeck (1826-1892)

== Career ==
From 1880 he studied organ at the Royal Conservatory of Brussels under Alphonse Mailly, whose assistant he became until 1902. In 1889 he met the young Paul Gilson who became a close friend and, despite being the same age, his teacher for orchestration. Gilson encouraged De Boeck's composition work.

He became an organist at various churches in Belgian villages (1892-1894 in Merchtem, 1894-1920 in Elsene). His academic career continued in 1907 as professor of harmony at the Royal Conservatory of Antwerp (1909–1920) and the Brussels Conservatory, and as director of the Conservatory of Mechelen (1921–1930). His students included Maria Scheepers. In 1930 August De Boeck retired to his birthplace, Merchtem.

As with Gilson, De Boeck's style was influenced by the Russian Five, and especially Nikolai Rimsky-Korsakov. Along with Gilson, he introduced impressionist composition in Belgium. He wrote about 400 compositions including vocal work, operas, religious pieces and instrumental compositions.

== Honours ==
- 1934 : Commander in the Order of Leopold.
- Member of the Royal Academy of Science, Letters and Fine Arts of Belgium

== Works ==
=== Orchestral works ===
- 1893 Rhapsodie Dahoméenne
- 1895 Symphony in G
- 1923 Fantasy on two Flemish folk tunes
- 1926 Fantasy for oboe and orchestra
- 1929 Concerto for violin and orchestra
- 1929 Concerto for Hans piano and orchestra (with Maria Scheepers)
- 1931 Nocturne
- 1932 Concerto for piano and orchestra
- 1936 Cantilène for cello and chamber orchestra
- 1937 In schuur
- Cinderella, symphonic poem
- Elegy for string orchestra
- Gavotte for string orchestra

=== Sacred works ===
- Three Masses, for three voices and organ
- 17 Spiritual Songs
- 1898 Trois Pièces, for organ

1. Prélude
2. Andante
3. Allegretto

- Allegro con fuoco, for organ
- Marche Nuptiale, for organ

=== Secular vocal works ===
- Songs: 54 on Flemish texts; 45 on French texts; 57 children's songs
  - Deux nouvelles Stances, for mezzo and piano
  - Enfantines, four songs for mezzo and piano
  - J'avais un coeur, for baritone and orchestra
  - In het woud, for soprano and orchestra (after a text of G. J. P. van Straaten)
  - L'église paysanne, for baritone and orchestra, on a text by Paul Fierens, and a Dutch translation Het kerkske van te lande by Maurits Sabbe
  - Mignonne for baritone and orchestra
  - Pour tes dents de nacre, for mezzo and orchestra
  - Six songs after poems of Jeanne Cuisinier, for mezzo and piano
  - Soirée de Septembre, for baritone and orchestra
  - Stances à Marylyse, six songs for mezzo and orchestra
  - Two songs after poems of Charles van Lerberghe, for mezzo and piano
- 12 Cantatas
  - Gloria Flori for chorus and orchestra
- 38 Motets

=== Operas and stage works ===
- 1901 Théroigne de Méricourt, Singspiel in two acts - libretto: Léonce du Catillon
- 1903 Winternachtsdroom, Singspiel in one act - libretto: Léonce du Catillon
- 1906 De Rijndwergen, musical fairy tale in three acts - libretto: Pol de Mont
- 1909 Reinaert de Vos, opera, in three acts - libretto: Raf Verhulst
- 1918 Papa Poliet, operette - libretto: Jan Vanderlee
- 1921 La Route d'Emeraude, lyric opera in four acts - libretto: Max Hautier naar het gelijknamig roman van Eugène Demolder
- 1929 Totole, operette - libretto: A. V. Lions

=== Ballets ===
- 1895 Cendrillon
- 1896 La Phalène

=== Incidental music ===
- 1894 La Chevalière d’Eon (G. Eekhoud)
- 1909 Jesus de Nazarener (R. Verhulst)

=== Chamber music ===
- 50 Compositions for piano
  - Nocturne, for piano solo
- 19 Works for piano and solo instrument
  - Sonata, for cello and piano (1894)
  - Cantilene, for cello and piano
  - Fantasia in G minor for viola and piano (1916)
  - Fantasie, for trombone and piano (1931)

=== Works for fanfare ===
- 1893 Rapsodie dahoméenne
- 1896 Symfonische Suite uit "La Phalène" - "De Nachtvlinder"
- 1902 Fantaisie
- 1912 Jubelmars - Marche Jubilaire
- 1929 Excelsior
- 1934 Geuze Lambik
- 1935 Vrijheidsgeest
- Pasquinade
- Marche Nuptiale
- Marche Solennelle
- Ave
- Bever en zoom
- Dyones
- Fanfare
- Impromptu
- Kapperpolka
- Oomken
- Pan
- Siskioo
- Scherzando
- Wozonmarch
- Floria patri
- Panache
- Soetendael
- Supermarch
- Snip - Snap
- Triplex
- Wals
- Plechtige Stoet

== Sources ==
- Mertens, Corneel (2001). "Boeck, August de". In Sadie, Stanley; Tyrrell, John (eds.). The New Grove Dictionary of Music and Musicians (2nd ed.). London: Macmillan Publishers. ISBN 978-1-56159-239-5.

Specific
