= Vrouwenoogen =

- Directed by: Caroline van Dommelen
- Release date: 18 March 1912
- Country: Netherlands
- Language: Silent

Vrouwenoogen is a 1912 Dutch silent drama film directed by Caroline van Dommelen.

== Cast ==
- Caroline van Dommelen
- Louis van Dommelen
- Jan van Dommelen
- Ansje van Dommelen-Kapper
- Cato Mertens-de Jaeger
