= De bloemen, die de ziel vertroosten =

- Directed by: Louis H. Chrispijn
- Produced by: Maurits Binger
- Starring: Mientje Kling
- Distributed by: Filmfabriek Hollandia
- Release date: 3 July 1914
- Running time: 10 minutes
- Country: Netherlands
- Language: Silent

De bloemen, die de ziel vertroosten (transl. The flowers that comfort the soul) is a 1914 Dutch silent drama film directed by Louis H. Chrispijn and produced by Maurits Binger.

== Plot ==
Helena is in love with Louis, her neighbor, to whom she will soon get engaged. In an attempt to stop a runaway horse, Helena gets a disfiguring scar across her face. Louis loses interest and eventually becomes engaged to her sister. Helena loses the will to live and fills her room with hundreds of hyacinths, committing suicide by inhaling the flowers' toxic fumes.

== Cast ==
- Mientje Kling as Helena
- Christine van Meeteren as Helena's sister
- Jan van Dommelen as Helena's father
- Louis van Dommelen as Louis
