= Moderne landhaaien =

1926 film

- Directed by: Alex Benno
- Written by: Alex Benno
- Release date: 19 March 1926
- Country: Netherlands
- Language: Silent

Moderne landhaaien is a 1926 Dutch silent comedy film directed by Alex Benno.

== Cast ==
- Kees Pruis - Hugo Writley
- Jan Grootveld - Longway
- Jan Rentmeester - Hugo's vader
- Maurits de Vries - Landhaai
- André van Dijk - Landhaai
- Vera van Haeften - Hulpen van de landhaaien
- Dolly Grey - Hulpen van de landhaaien
- Willy Thomas - Neger
- Willem Faassen - Paul Mathon
- Jan van Dommelen - Bezoeker in cabaret
- Sylvain Poons
- Mary Beekman
- Betsy van Berkel
- Nelly Ernst
- Ko Rentmeester
