= Maria Scheepers =

Belgian pianist (1892 - 1989)

Maria Scheepers van Dommelen (17 November 1892 - 1989) was a Belgian pianist who arranged works and premiered several concerti for the Hans piano. She also performed with the Belgian Vocal Trio and arranged music for it. She used the pseudonym Mit Scapus.

Scheepers was born in Antwerp and lived there her entire life. She studied at the Royal Conservatory of Antwerp with August De Boeck. As a concert pianist, she presented many concerts with pianist Flore Levine-Cousyns. She performed with the Belgian Vocal Trio with Roitel and Tolkowsky, and arranged over 60 songs for the trio. She also served as president of the Concerts de Midi d'Anvers.

In 1926, Pierre Hans commissioned August De Boeck to compose a concerto for the Hans piano. Hans was an engineer with very thick fingers, who had asked the French firm Pleyel to build a piano he designed with an upper keyboard and a lower keyboard tuned a half tone apart. Scheepers created the solo Hans piano part for De Boeck’s concerto and premiered it. She also premiered Hans piano concerti composed by Ernest d’Agrèves, René Barbier, Pierre Hans, and Carl Smulders. She taught Hans piano courses at conservatories in Belgium, France, Germany, Luxembourg and the Netherlands, and transcribed pieces for regular piano so they could be played on the Hans piano. Her manuscript for the De Boeck concerto is archived at the Letterenhuis in Belgium. The Hans piano was very expensive to build and fell out of use after World War II.
