= De zigeunerin =

1914 film

- Directed by: Louis H. Chrispijn
- Release date: 1914
- Country: Netherlands
- Language: Silent

De zigeunerin is a 1914 short Dutch silent film directed by Louis H. Chrispijn.

== Cast ==
- Christine van Meeteren ... Tiska
- Louis H. Chrispijn ... Prof. Mortman
- Theo Frenkel Jr. ... Jack Mortman
- Julia Cuypers ... Zus van prof. Mortman / Sister of prof. Mortman
