= Don Juan (1913 film) =

- Directed by: Léon Boedels
- Produced by: F.A. Nöggerath Jr.
- Release date: July 23, 1913
- Country: Netherlands
- Language: Silent

Don Juan is a 1913 Dutch silent drama film directed by Léon Boedels.

== Cast ==
- Willem van der Veer as Don Juan
- Caroline van Dommelen
- Tilly Lus
- Constant van Kerckhoven Jr.
