= Een danstragedie =

- Directed by: Johan Gildemeijer
- Release date: 1916
- Country: Netherlands
- Language: Silent

Een danstragedie is a 1916 Dutch silent film directed by Johan Gildemeijer.

== Cast ==
- Adelqui Migliar - Mario
- Meina Irwen - Mario's vrouw / Mario's wife
- Piety Wigman - Hun dochter / Their daughter
- Jo Wigman - Hun dochter / Their daughter
- Christine Poolman - Mario's moeder / Mario's mother
- Louis Gimberg - Gentleman
- Caroline van Dommelen - Barones / Baroness
