= Ontrouw =

1911 film

- Directed by: Louis Chrispijn Jr.
- Release date: 1 October 1911
- Running time: 40 minutes
- Country: Netherlands
- Language: Silent

Ontrouw is a 1911 Dutch silent drama film directed by Louis Chrispijn Jr.

== Cast ==
- Kees Lageman... Kolonel Brachart
- Caroline van Dommelen ... Renée Brachart
- Louis Chrispijn Jr. ... Luitenant Raoul des Vignes
- Jan Buderman
- Jan van Dommelen
