= Nederland en Oranje =

- Directed by: Louis H. Chrispijn
- Written by: Louis H. Chrispijn
- Release date: 11 September 1913
- Country: Netherlands
- Language: Silent

Nederland en Oranje is a 1913 Dutch silent historical drama film directed by Louis H. Chrispijn. The film features nineteen short pieces with themes from Dutch national history and was made to celebrate the Dutch Kingdom.

According to Ruud Bishoff's Hollywood in Holland, much of the segments are tableau vivants, with much eye for accuracy when it comes to appearance.

== Plot ==
In the first segment, Willem the Silent (Jan van Dommelen) and the Van Brederode are demanding freedom of religion for the repressed Dutch citizens with governor Margaret of Parma (Christine van Meeteren). Charles de Berlaymont, sharing the opinion with Willem the Silent, opposes the Spanish dictation and introduces the 'honorary title' Geuzen. Together with his men, he swears 'Death or Freedom'. Meanwhile, Balthasar Gérard (Theo Frenkel), an admirer of Willem the Silent's enemy Philip II of Spain, unexpectedly assassins Willem the Silent.

The second segment features Pieter Corneliszoon Hooft, as he performs at his Muiderslot. In the following, Maurice of Nassau, Prince of Orange (Charles Gilhuys) battles for the Netherlands' independence. The fourth segment includes Kenau Simonsdochter Hasselaer during the Siege of Haarlem. Next is the Siege of Breda, where one of the soldiers gets heavily ill, while a battle with the Spanish is near. The continuing is a description of the siege, ending with the capture of Breda.

The following segment involves the escape of Hugo Grotius from Loevestein via a casket, organized by his wife (Mientje Kling) and a maid. Then comes the Siege of 's-Hertogenbosch by Frederick Henry, Prince of Orange (Willem Roemer). In an interlude, Rembrandt, Frans Hals and Jan Steen are seen in different scenes creating a painting. What comes after is a wedding taking place between Kloris and Roosje.

In a bigger story, John William Friso, Prince of Orange (Marcel Mijin) is in Taisnières-sur-Hon to fight the Battle of Malplaquet. Subsequently, Michiel de Ruyer (Jan Buderman) and Maarten Tromp (Jan Holtrop) end their struggle after a long fight through help from William III of England (Louis van Dommelen). Attention then shifts to stadthouder William IV, Prince of Orange, followed by William V, Prince of Orange. Their crown was taken over by Louis Bonaparte. The film ends with William I of the Netherlands' (Jan van Dommelen) arrival in Scheveningen and his oath to the constitution.

== Cast ==
- Jan van Dommelen as Willem the Silent/William I of the Netherlands
- Eugenie Krix as Louise de Coligny
- Christine van Meeteren as Margaret of Parma
- Theo Frenkel as Balthasar Gérard
- Charles Gilhuys as Maurice of Nassau, Prince of Orange
- Willem Roemer as Frederick Henry, Prince of Orange
- Louis van Dommelen as William III of England
- Marcel Mijin as John William Friso, Prince of Orange
- Jan Buderman as Michiel de Ruyter
- Jan Holtrop as Maarten Tromp
- Mientje Kling as Maria van Reigersbergen, wife of Hugo Grotius
- Annie Bos as Maria Tesselschade
- Louis H. Chrispijn
- Lau Ezerman
- Koba Kinsbergen
