= Mientje Kling =

Dutch actress (1894–1966)

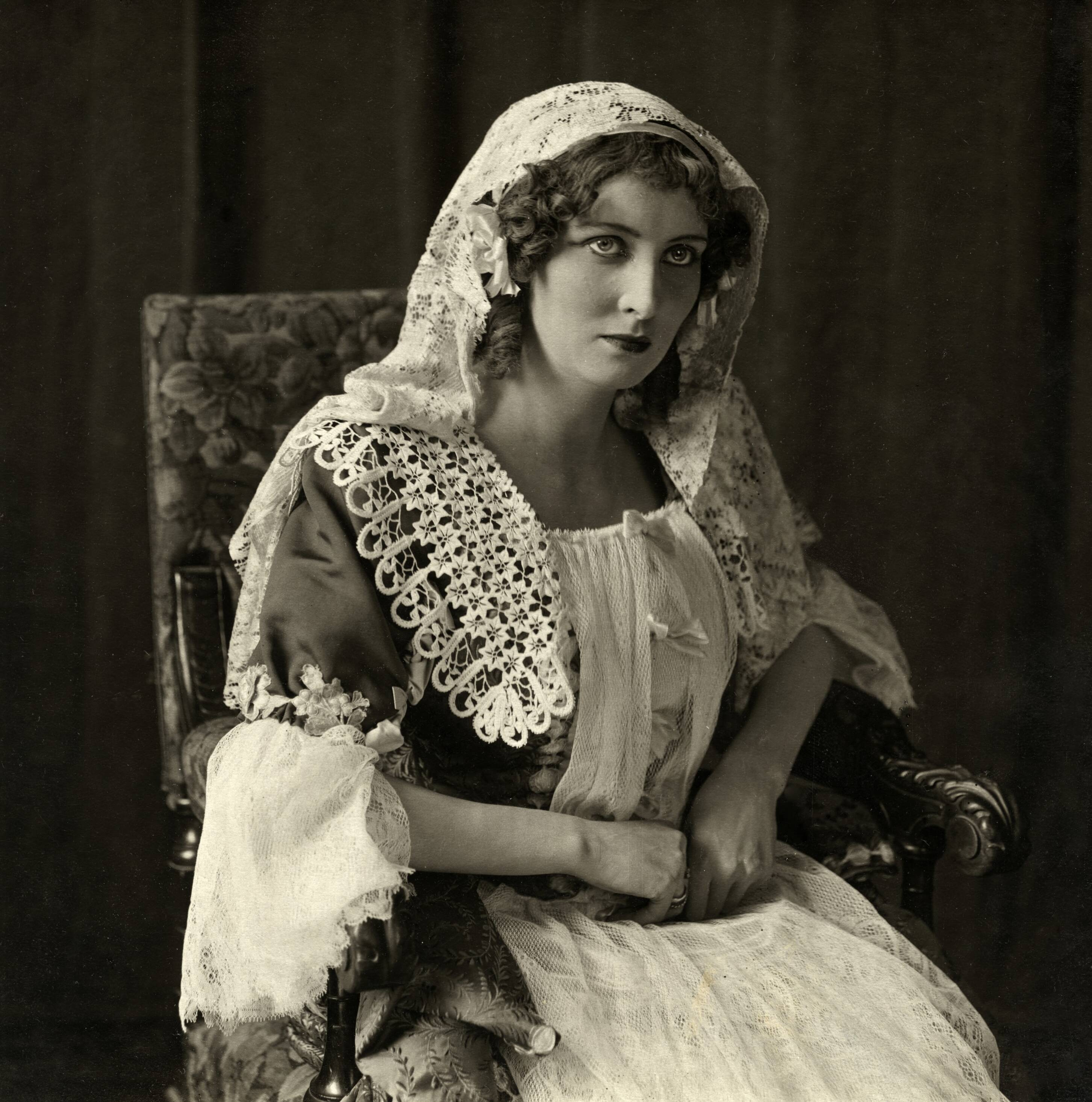
- Kling as Isabelle in the 1916 film De Universele Erfgename
- Born: Wilhelmina Francisca Kling; 27 July 1894; Amsterdam, Netherlands
- Died: 26 February 1966 (aged 71); Amsterdam, Netherlands
- Other names: Mien Kling; Mientje van Kerckhoven-Kling
- Occupation: Actress
- Years active: 1910–1965
- Spouse: Constant van Kerckhoven

Mientje Kling (born Wilhelmina Francisca Kling; 27 July 1894 – 26 February 1966) was a Dutch theatre and film actress and radio personality.

Mientje Kling was born in Amsterdam. Kling made her stage at the Koninklijke Vereeniging Het Nederlandsch Tooneel theatre and performed from 1913 in silent films for Filmfabriek Hollandia film studios. In the 1920s and 1930s, she worked alongside many popular actors in several plays for the Central Tooneel theatre. After her marriage to actor Constant van Kerckhoven, she performed mainly in radio dramas. She died at the age of 71 in Amsterdam.

== Selected filmography ==
- Nederland en Oranje (1913)
- Krates (1913)
- Liefde waakt (1914)
- Zijn viool (1914)
- De bloemen, die de ziel vertroosten (1914)
- Heilig recht (1914)
- The Devil in Amsterdam (1919)
- Amsterdam bij nacht (1924)
- De Speeldoos (1926)
