= Zijn viool =

1914 film

De Stradivarus
- Directed by: Maurits Binger, Louis H. Chrispijn
- Release date: 20 March 1914
- Country: Netherlands
- Language: Silent

De Stradivarus or Zijn viool is a 1914 Dutch silent drama film directed by Maurits Binger and Louis H. Chrispijn.

== Cast ==
- Boris Lensky ... Violist / Violin player
- Margot Laurentius-Jonas ... Moeder / Mother
- Mientje Kling ... Elsa
- Eugenie Krix ... Gravin de Montjoie / Countess de Montjoie
- Theo Frenkel
- Jan Holtrop ... Houtvester / Forester
- Koba Kinsbergen
- Bertha Laurentius
- Christine van Meeteren
- Jan van Dommelen
