= Koningin Elisabeth's dochter =

1915 film

- Directed by: Johan Gildemeijer
- Written by: Johan Gildemeijer
- Release date: 15 October 1915
- Country: Netherlands
- Language: Silent

Koningin Elisabeth's dochter is a 1915 Dutch silent drama film directed by Johan Gildemeijer.

== Cast ==
- Julia Cuypers ... Julia Berna
- Frederick Vogeding ... Man van Julia Berna / Husband of Julia Berna
- Martijn de Vries ... Gonda Berna op 3-jarige leeftijd / Gonda Berna aged 3
- Hesje de Vries ... Gonda Berna op 5-jarige leeftijd / Gonda Berna aged 5
- Jopie Tourniaire ... Jeane Bachiloupi
- August Van den Hoeck ... Alex Dalfo
- Paula de Waart ... Actrice / Actress
- Alex Benno ... Impresario / Agent
