= Silvia Silombra =

1913 film

- Directed by: Louis H. Chrispijn
- Written by: A.W.G. van Riemsdijk (play)
- Release date: 28 September 1913
- Country: Netherlands
- Language: Silent

Silvia Silombra is a 1913 Dutch silent drama film directed by Louis H. Chrispijn.

== Cast ==
- Julia Cuypers ... Volwassen Silvia / grown-up Silvia
- Willem van der Veer
- Charles Gilhuys
- Louis H. Chrispijn
- Caroline van Dommelen
- Enny de Leeuwe ... Kind Silvia / child Silvia
- Jan van Dommelen ... Silvia's vader / priester / Silvia's father / priest
- Mary Beekman
- Jan Holtrop
- Christine van Meeteren
