= Krates =

1913 film

- Directed by: Louis H. Chrispijn
- Written by: Justus van Maurik (book)
- Release date: 28 November 1913
- Country: Netherlands
- Language: Silent

Krates is a 1913 Dutch silent drama film directed by Louis H. Chrispijn.

== Cast ==
- Cor Laurentius ... Jonge Theodoor Makko / Krates / Young Theodoor Makko / Krates
- Charles Gilhuys ... Oudere Theodoor Makko / Krates / Elderly Theodoor Makko / Krates
- Eugenie Krix ... Juffrouw Ram / miss Ram
- Gerard Pilger Sr. ... Philip Strijkman
- Willem Hunsche ... Löbell
- Mientje Kling ... Augusta Tournel
- Jan van Dommelen ... Signor Carlo
- Alex Benno
- Louis Chrispijn Jr.
- Christine van Meeteren
- Gerard Pilger Jr.
