= Herman Heijermans =

Dutch dramatist and author (1864–1924)

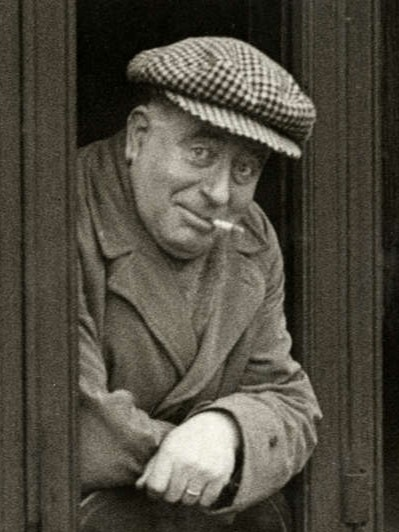
- Heijermans in 1923
- Born: Herman Heijermans; 3 December 1864; Rotterdam, South Holland, Netherlands
- Died: 22 November 1924 (aged 59); Zandvoort, North Holland, Netherlands
- Resting place: Zorgvlied cemetery, Amsterdam, Netherlands
- Occupation: Playwright
- Writing career
- Language: Dutch
- Notable works: Ghetto (1898); The Good Hope (1900); A Case of Arson (1903); Links (1903); Eva Bonheur (1916); The Wise Tomcat (1917)

Signature
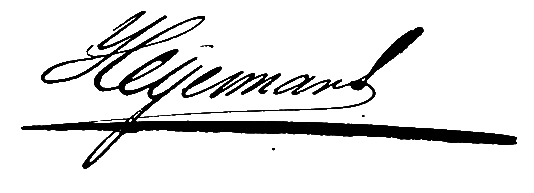

Herman Heijermans (3 December 1864 – 22 November 1924), was a Dutch playwright, novelist and sketch story writer, who is considered to be the greatest Dutch dramatist of the modern era. He is the most notable playwright from the Netherlands since Joost van den Vondel to have gained widespread recognition outside his own country.

== Biography ==
=== Early life (1864–1892) ===
Heijermans was born in Rotterdam into a liberal Jewish family, the fourth child and eldest son of eleven siblings. His father, Herman Heijermans Sr., was a journalist for the 'Nieuwe Rotterdamsche Courant' and an advocate of 19th-century Jewish emancipation, promoting integration into broader culture and intellectual society. Painter Marie Heijermans was his sister.

The family, intellectually inclined but economically strained, struggled to assert itself within Rotterdam's mercantile class. Young Herman, taking on responsibility early, became a de facto "third parent" within the household. He initially followed his father's wishes by working at a bank, but his heart remained with writing. After a failed business venture in the rag trade and a broken engagement, Heijermans faced financial ruin in 1890, prompting him to turn seriously to literature.

=== Literary Beginnings (1892–1897) ===
Heijermans debuted in 1892 with the novella 'n Jodenstreek? ('A Jew's trick?') published in De Gids, prompting a move to Amsterdam and a role as theatre critic at De Telegraaf. He quickly rose to prominence, though his assertive manner drew criticism. During the winter of 1891-92 Heijermans had written his first play, using the theme of Henrik Ibsen's A Doll's House and adding new characters and an authentic Dutch setting. Dora Kremer premiered on April 25, 1893, at the Groote Schouwburg in Rotterdam, and was met with general disapproval. Eager to avenge the humiliation, Heijermans plotted one of the most daring stratagems in modern Dutch literature. Determined to demonstrate that anyone but a Hollander would receive a warm welcome to the Dutch stage, he seized upon the Russian-sounding pseudonym 'Ivan Jelakowitch' and, keeping his own identity secret, announced his new one-act play Ahasverus, about a Jewish family caught in the violence of the pogroms of the 1880s. The play was a great success. In an article in De Telegraaf, Heijermans revealed his secret, quoting the reviews of Ahasverus along with the comments on Dora Kremer, much to the mortification of the critics.

Having won a triumphant victory with the name of Ivan Jelakowitch, Heijermans decided to adopt another pseudonym, 'Samuel Falkland Jr.', publishing a series of sketches of life in Amsterdam in De Telegraaf, and later in the Algemeen Handelsblad daily. These so-called 'Falklandjes' were later collected and published in book form, filling no less than eighteen volumes.

In 1895, Heijermans began a relationship with Marie Peers, a singer with two daughters, and sought to create a new life. When her estranged husband returned to claim the children, the emotional fallout reinforced Heijermans’ growing belief that society punished spiritual integrity. Heijermans recast the experiences of their early years in the highly autobiographical novel Sin in a Furnished Room, written in 1896 under the pseudonym of 'Koos Habbema'; a defense of the essential purity of free love as against the corrupt marriages of bourgeois society. By 1897, he broke with his past—including journalism, the theatre world, and even his father, and joined the Social Democratic Workers' Party.

=== Socialist Writer and Dramatist (1897–1907) ===
Embracing socialism, Heijermans developed a new literary voice rooted in what he termed 'socialist naturalism': a synthesis of naturalism's gritty realism and the hope for revolutionary change. He launched the magazine De Jonge Gids ('The Young Guide'), which he was able to keep going for four years. Much of his own work appeared in it, including stories, one-act plays, and fragments of novels and full-length plays. In 1898 The Ghetto premiered, a play exploring Jewish identity and social justice. Its success established his reputation as a playwright.

His breakthrough came with The Good Hope (1900), an indictment of the exploitation of sea fishermen in the Netherlands at the turn of the century. It became Heijermans' most popular play and an international success, performed from New York to Tokyo. The continuing popularity of the play turned the attention of the public to conditions in the fishing industry, and a campaign was soon under way for a law requiring strict inspections of unseaworthy vessels. A Dutch merchant shipping act was passed a few years later, the 'Schepenwet' of 1909.

In both quality and quantity, 1903 was one of the most productive years in the playwright's career: he wrote four one-act plays, The Child, The Screen, The Case of Arson and Neighbors, two full-length plays, Links and Maytime, and a revised version of earlier work Number Eighty. With Links especially he made another contribution of real significance to the European drama; the play was staged in London, Berlin, Vienna and Stockholm, and received a film adaptation in 1920. A Case of Arson, notable for Henri de Vries' performance as no less than seven different characters, was staged in the United Kingdom with De Vries reprising his roles in English.

Despite professional success, financial hardship continued. The Netherlands’ absence from the Berne Convention denied him royalties abroad. Heijermans speculated on the stock market with initial success, but the 1907 crash left him heavily indebted once more.

=== Late Career (1907–1918) ===
Seeking greater opportunities, Heijermans moved to Berlin in 1907. However, changing tastes rendered his naturalist style outdated, and new works failed to gain traction. He overextended financially and suffered health issues, while tensions with Marie intensified. The couple divorced in 1918.

Professionally, Heijermans faced the collapse of his long-time theatre company, the 'Nederlandsche Tooneelvereeniging'. He salvaged it by assuming full control, reducing staff, and creating wartime one-act plays. Despite managerial burdens, he returned to writing, producing plays like Dawn (1916) and Eva Bonheur (1916). The latter, featuring an elaborate split-stage device, would later be considered one of his finest plays. During the summer of the following year, he wrote socialist-inspired fairytale The Wise Tomcat, a sharp satire in which, in the comparison of the ways of man and beast, man comes off second best.

In 1919, Heijermans married actress Annie Jurgens, with whom he had two children. His second marriage brought personal peace, though professional struggles remained. A failed bid to secure the Amsterdam Stadsschouwburg and subsequent financial losses plagued the final years of his theatre company. By 1923, faced with bankruptcy, he dissolved the troupe and returned to journalism.

=== Death ===
In 1924, Heijermans was diagnosed with cancer. Despite surgeries and radiation treatment, his condition worsened. Herman Heijermans died on 22 November 1924 in Zandvoort, eleven days shy of his 60th birthday. He is buried at Zorgvlied cemetery.

== Works ==
=== Plays ===
- Dora Kremer (1893)
- Ahasverus (1893); one-act play
- Vorstendom (1893); one-act play, later performed as Ego
- Puntje (1898); one-act play
- Het antwoord (1898); one-act play
- The Ghetto (Ghetto, 1898)
- Number Eighty (Nummer tachtig, 1898); one-act play
- De onbekende (1899); one-act play
- De machien (1899); one-act play
- The Seventh Commandment (Het zevende gebod, 1899)
- Eén Mei (1900)
- The Good Hope (Op Hoop van Zegen, 1900)
- Het pantser (1901)
- Ora et labora (1901)
- The Child (Het kind, 1903); one-act play
- The Screen (Het kamerschut, 1903); one-act play
- A Case of Arson (Brand in de Jonge Jan, 1903); one-act play
- Links (Schakels, 1903)
- Neighbors (Buren, 1903); one-act play
- Maytime (Bloeimaand, 1903)
- Saltimbank; one-act play
- Allerzielen (1904)
- Artikel 188 (1905)
- De meid (1905)
- Feest (1906); one-act play
- De dasspeld (1906); one-act play
- Verloving (1906)
- Uitkomst (1907)
- Vreemde jacht (1907)
- De grote vlucht (1908)
- The Rising Sun (De opgaande zon; 1908)
- De schone slaapster (1909)
- Nocturne (1910); one-act play
- Verveling (1910); monodrama
- Beschuit met muisjes (1910)
- Glück auf! (1911)
- Brief in schemer (1914); one-act play
- De buikspreker (1914); one-act play
- Een heerenhuis te koop (1914); one-act play
- Robert en Bertram en Comp. (1914)
- Dageraad (1916)
- Eva Bonheur (1916)
- The Wise Tomcat (De wijze kater, 1917)
- No. 17, of: De noodlottige gelijkenis (1919)
- Pitten (1918); eenakter
- The Flying Dutchman (De vliegende Hollander, 1920)
- Van ouds "De Morgenster" (1923)

=== Prose ===
- 'n Jodenstreek? (1892); novella
- Trinette (1892); novella
- Fleo (1893); prose poem
- Schetsen van Samuel Falkland (1897-1914); sketch stories, eighteen volumes
- Sabbath (1897); novella
- Interieurs (1898); short stories
- Sin in a Furnished Room (Kamertjeszonde, 1896); novel
- Erezaken (1903)
- Diamantstad (1904); novel
- Kleine verschrikkingen (1904); sketch stories
- Drijvende klompjes (1904); sketch stories
- Gevleugelde daden (1905); sketch stories
- Biecht eener schuldige (1905); epistolary novel, written in the form of a personal diary
- Kleine vertelsels (1906); sketch stories
- Wat niet kon (1907); short stories
- Joep's wonderlijke avonturen (1907); novel
- Berliner Skizzenbuch; sketch stories
- 'n Wereldstad (1908); sketch stories
- De roode Filibustier (1909); novel
- Duczika (1911); novel
- Droomkoninkje (1924); novel
- Levensschetsen (1924); short stories
- Vuurvlindertje (1925); unfinished novel
- De moord in de trein (1925); unfinished novel, later completed by A.M. de Jong

== General and cited sources ==
- Flaxman, Seymour Lawrence (1954). Herman Heijermans and his dramas. Martinus Nijhoff. ISBN 978-9-40-118441-0.
- Goedkoop, Hans (1996). Geluk. Het leven van Herman Heijermans. Arbeiderspers. ISBN 978-9-02-951651-8.
