= Alex Benno =

Dutch actor (1873–1952)

- Born: 2 November 1873; Oberhausen, German Empire
- Died: 2 April 1952 (aged 78); Haarlem, Netherlands
- Occupations: Actor, screenwriter, film director
- Years active: 1913-1937

Alex Benno (2 November 1873 – 2 April 1952) was a Dutch film actor, screenwriter and director of the silent era. He appeared in 15 films between 1913 and 1920.

== Career ==
Benno, born German in a Jewish family, moved to the Netherlands before directing films himself for the first time in 1919. He played small roles in a number of films by other directors, and acted as a so-called character comedian who had put some of his creations on paper. Quite a number of episodes of sheet music show his productivity in this field.

== Filmography ==
- John Heriot's Wife (1920)
- Schakels (1920)
- Brotherhood of Steel (1918)
- Madame Pinkette & Co (1917)
- Majoor Frans (1916)
- Vogelvrij (1916)
- Het geheim van den vuurtoren (1916)
- Koningin Elisabeth's dochter (1915)
- Ontmaskerd (1915)
- Toffe jongens onder de mobilisatie (1914)
- Luchtkastelen (1914)
- Weergevonden (1914)
- Heilig recht (1914)
- Liefde waakt (1914)
- Krates (1913)
- De levende ladder (1913)
