= Sjef Mertens =

Dutch footballer

Personal information
- Date of birth: 15 January 1926
- Date of death: 21 July 2004 (aged 78)

International career
Years	Team	Apps	(Gls)
1950	Netherlands	1	(0)

Sjef Mertens (15 January 1926 – 21 July 2004) was a Dutch footballer. He played in one match for the Netherlands national football team in 1950.
