= Caroline van Dommelen =

Dutch actress (1874–1957)

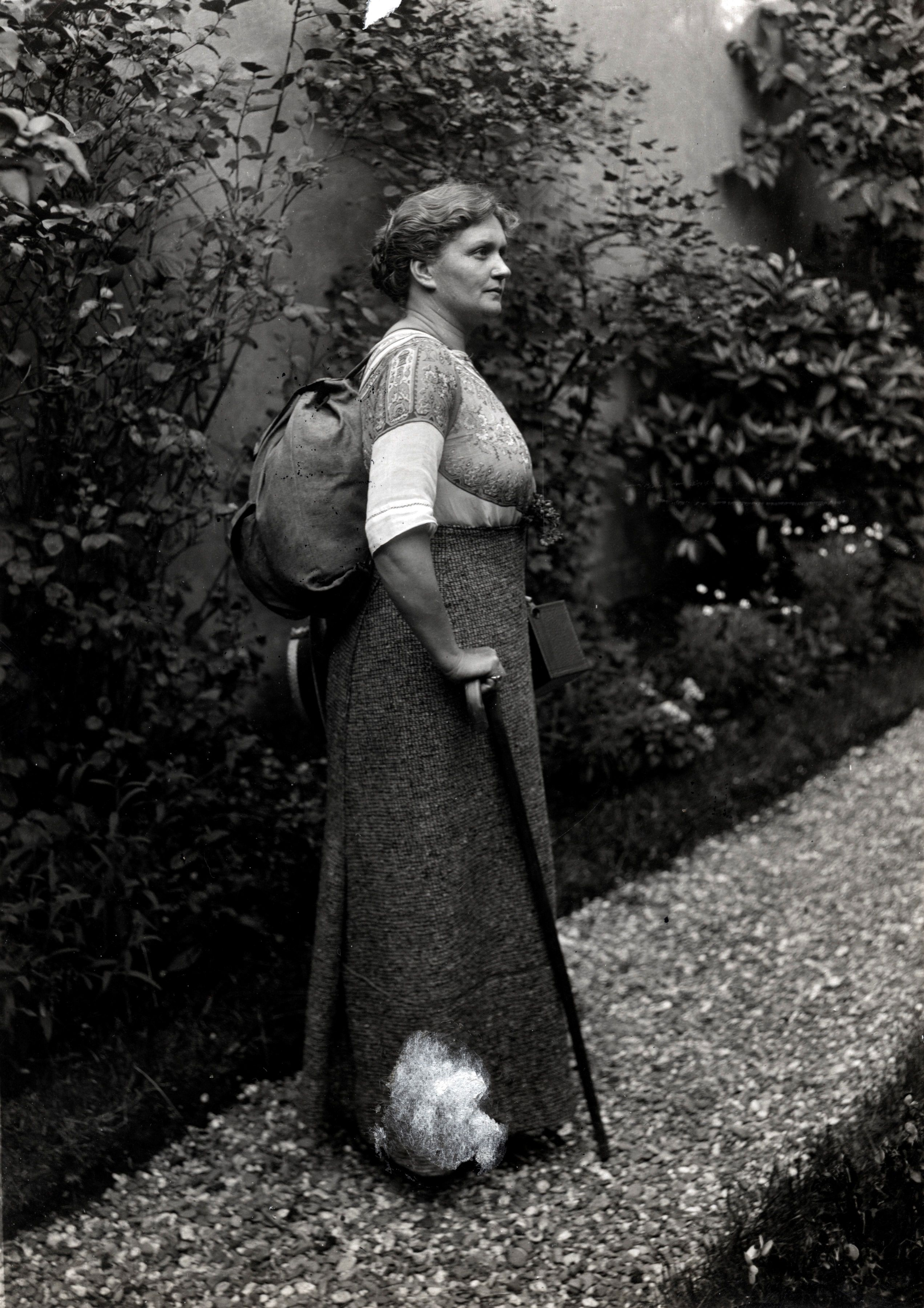
- Caroline van Dommelen c. 1914
- Born: 9 November 1874; Rotterdam, Netherlands
- Died: 4 March 1957 (aged 82); Amsterdam, Netherlands
- Occupation: Film actress
- Years active: 1911–1918
- Relatives: Jan van Dommelen (brother)

Caroline van Dommelen (9 November 1874 – 4 March 1957) was a Dutch film actress and director of the silent era. She appeared in 11 films between 1911 and 1918, and directed three during this time period. Several of her family members – including her brother, Jan van Dommelen – were involved in filmmaking.

== Filmography ==
- Ontrouw (1911)
- De bannelingen (1911)
- Vrouwenoogen (1912)
- Roze Kate (1912)
- Don Juan (1913)
- Silvia Silombra (1913)
- Het geheim van het slot Arco (1915)
- Een danstragedie (1916)
- Oorlog en vrede - 1914 (1918)
- Oorlog en vrede - 1916 (1918)
- Oorlog en vrede - 1918 (1918)
