= The Fatal Woman =

- Directed by: Maurits Binger, Louis H. Chrispijn
- Release date: 6 April 1915
- Country: Netherlands
- Language: Silent

The Fatal Woman (Dutch: De Vloek van het Testament) is a 1915 Dutch silent drama film directed by Maurits Binger and Louis H. Chrispijn. It was distributed by Hollandia films, and screened with such foreign films as Her Luck in London.

De vloek van het testament can be translated as The curse of the testimony; the film was a big Dutch movie at the time with 48 copies through Europe and 12 copies crossing to America. It was the last directed movie of Chrispijn; he wanted to get out of movies.

== Plot ==
The storyline is about a testimony found in an old wooden desk and advocate couple van Dalen claiming the rights of it. After a big manhunt (everybody wants the testimony), it comes back to the finder and rightful owner.

== Cast ==
- Annie Bos ... Annie van Dalen
- Willem van der Veer ... Willem van Dalen
- Jan van Dommelen ... Jan Velsen, Cabinetmaker
- Coen Hissink
- Nelly De Heer
- Fred Homann
