= Jan van Dommelen =

Dutch silent film actor (1878–1942)

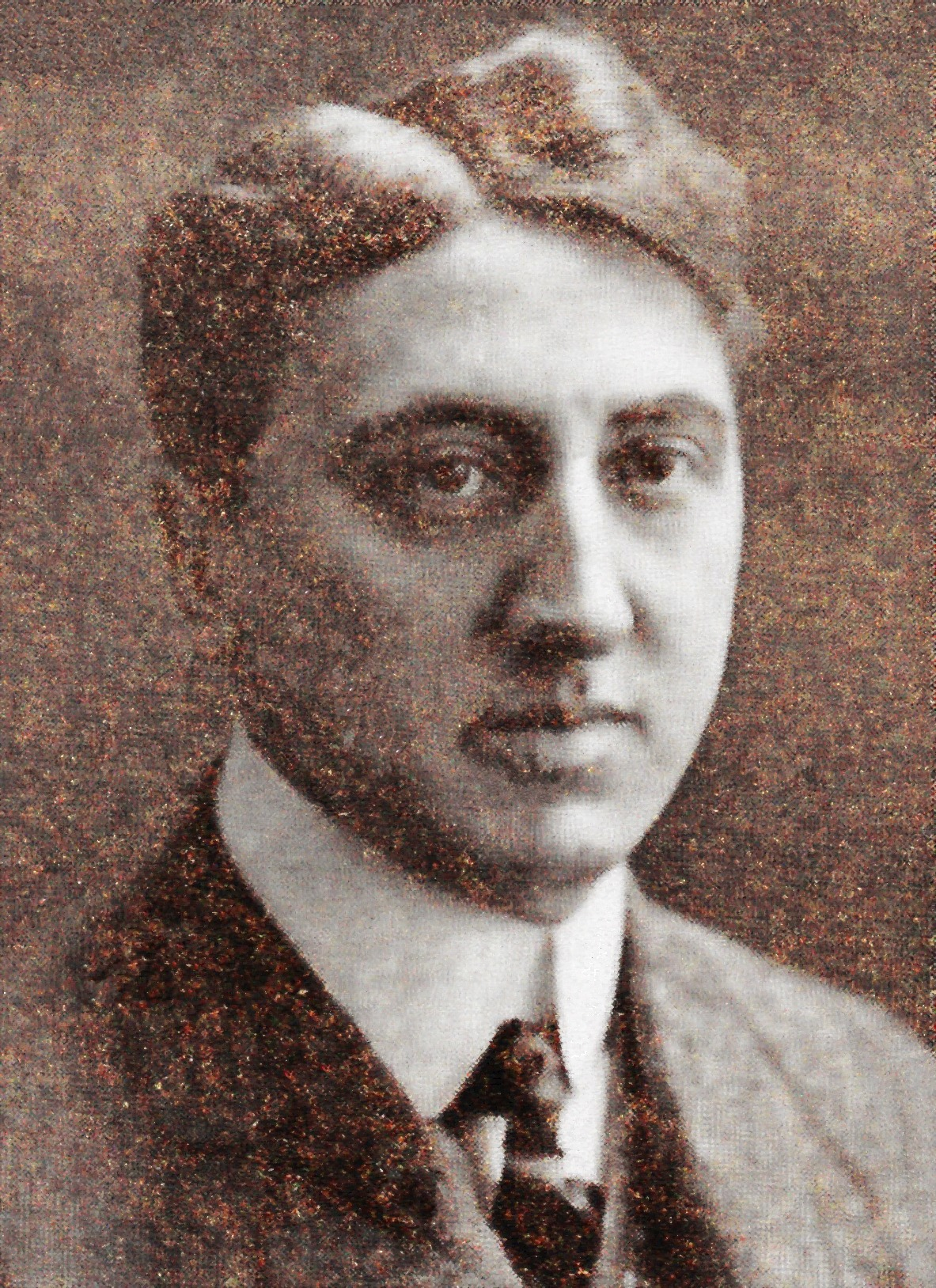
- Born: 28 April 1878; Amsterdam, Netherlands
- Died: 26 October 1942 (aged 64); Santpoort, Netherlands
- Occupation: Actor
- Years active: 1911-1939

Jan van Dommelen (28 April 1878 – 26 October 1942) was a Dutch film actor of the silent era. He appeared in 44 films between 1911 and 1939.

== Filmography ==
- Boefje (1939)
- De Big van het Regiment (1935)
- De Familie van mijn Vrouw (1935)
- Moderne landhaaien (1926)
- Bleeke Bet (1923)
- Bulldog Drummond (1922)
- De leugen van Pierrot (1922)
- Rechten der jeugd (1921)
- Schakels (1920)
- Een Carmen van het Noorden (1919)
- Het goudvischje (1919)
- Amerikaansche meisjes (1918)
- Oorlog en vrede - 1918 (1918)
- Op hoop van zegen (1918)
- Oorlog en vrede - 1916 (1918)
- Oorlog en vrede - 1914 (1918)
- Toen 't licht verdween (1918)
- De kroon der schande (1918)
- Ulbo Garvema (1917)
- Gouden ketenen (1917)
- Madame Pinkette & Co (1917)
- Het geheim van Delft (1917)
- La renzoni (1916)
- Majoor Frans (1916)
- Het geheim van den vuurtoren (1916)
- Liefdesstrijd (1915)
- Ontmaskerd (1915)
- De vrouw Clasina (1915)
- Het geheim van het slot arco (1915)
- De vloek van het testament (1915)
- Toffe jongens onder de mobilisatie (1914)
- Luchtkastelen (1914)
- Weergevonden (1914)
- Heilig recht (1914)
- De bloemen, die de ziel vertroosten (1914)
- Liefde waakt (1914)
- Zijn viool (1914)
- Krates (1913)
- Silvia Silombra (1913)
- Nederland en Oranje (1913)
- Roze Kate (1912)
- Vrouwenoogen (1912)
- De bannelingen (1911)
- Ontrouw (1911)
