= Esther de Boer-van Rijk =

Dutch stage actress (1853–1937)

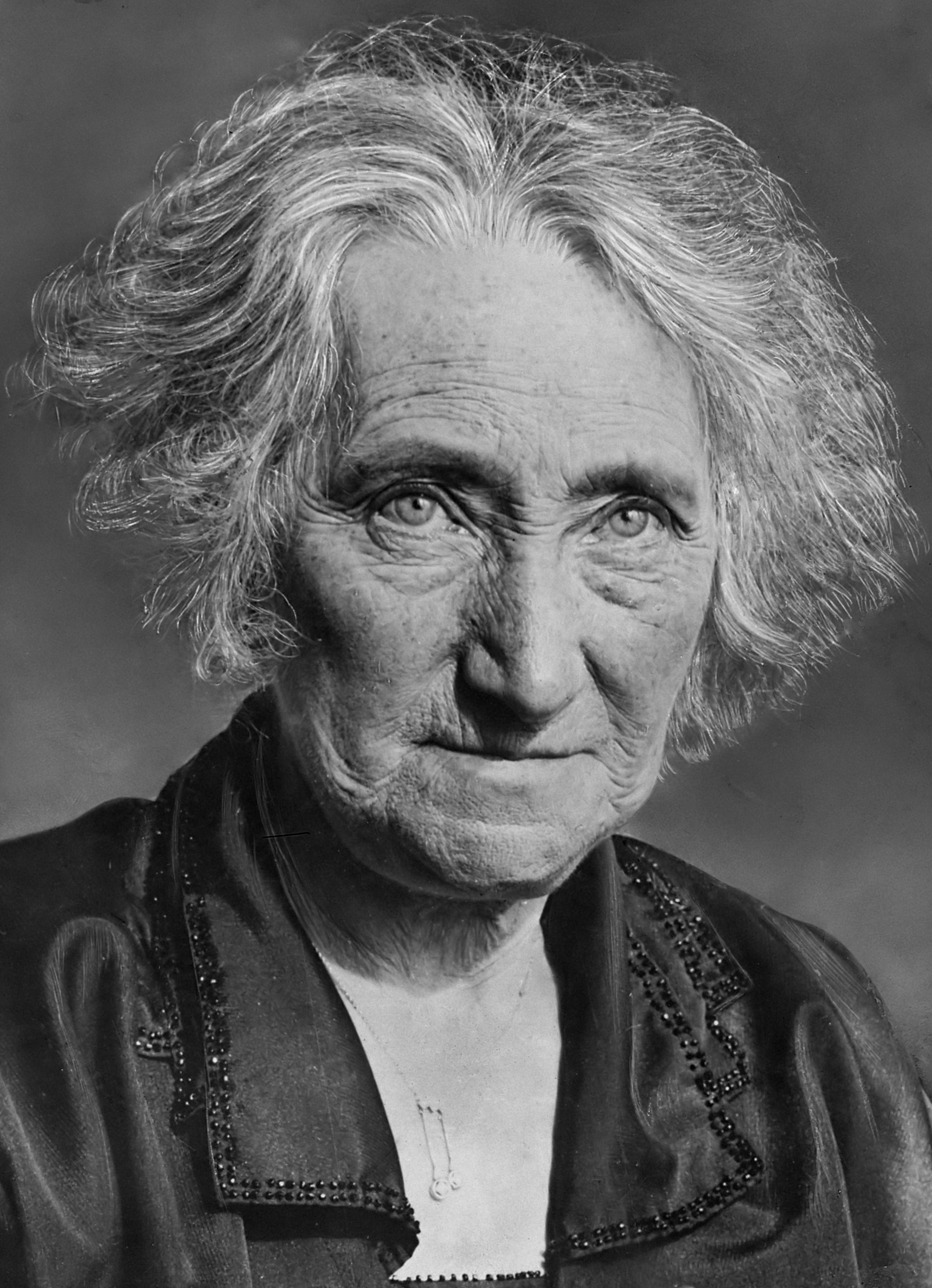
- Esther de Boer-van Rijk in 1928
- Born: Ester van Rijk; 29 July 1853; Rotterdam, Netherlands
- Died: 7 September 1937 (aged 84); Amsterdam, Netherlands
- Occupation: Stage actress
- Years active: 1867–1937
- Spouse: Henri de Boer (m. 1881, died 1917)
- Children: 1

Esther de Boer-van Rijk (born Ester van Rijk; 29 July 1853 – 7 September 1937) was a Dutch stage actress. She became one of the most celebrated actresses in the Netherlands, known for her realistic portrayals of women in the plays of Herman Heijermans, particularly the role of Kniertje in the play Op hoop van zegen.

== Early life ==
Van Rijk was born into a modest Jewish Orthodox family in Rotterdam. Her parents were Samuel Moses van Rijk, an administrator, and Adriana Wolfhart, a seamstress. After her father's death when she was eight years old, she began working in her mother's sewing workshop from the age of twelve. Although she was expected to become a seamstress, she showed a strong inclination toward acting from early childhood. This in spite of family resistance to the theatre, which was viewed as morally dangerous.

== Early career ==
While working as a seamstress, Van Rijk entered amateur theatre. She made her stage debut in 1867 in De jager, de huzaar en het oestermeisje. At nineteen she won a prize for best actress at an amateur competition, which led to an engagement with the progressive Rotterdam company of Le Gras, Van Zuylen en Haspels. With the support of director Antoine le Gras, Van Rijk made her professional debut in 1874 as Laura in Emma Berthold by Jacob Jan Cremer. She worked mainly in Rotterdam, with a brief and unsuccessful stay in Antwerp due to homesickness.

== Marriage and move to Amsterdam ==
In 1881 she married the musician Henri de Boer. The couple had one daughter, Sophie. In 1882 Van Rijk moved to Amsterdam after her husband obtained a position with the opera company. Soon afterward he became seriously ill and was eventually unable to work, leaving her responsible for supporting the family. This situation caused lasting financial strain.

== Major roles and fame ==
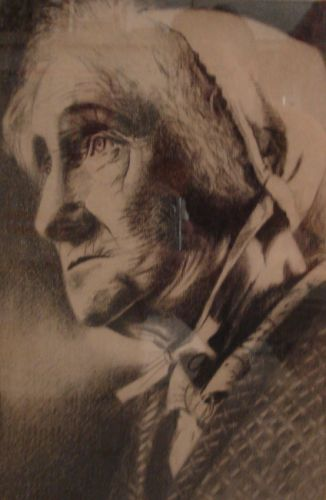
Esther de Boer-van Rijk as Kniertje

In Amsterdam, De Boer-van Rijk performed with several companies, including the Salon des Variétés , which developed into an avant-garde theatre staging works by authors such as Henrik Ibsen and Émile Zola. In 1893 she joined De Nederlandsche Tooneelvereeniging (Dutch Theatre Association, NTV), a democratically organised company with idealistic aims. De Boer-van Rijk later described her years there as the finest of her career. At the NTV she became closely associated with the work of Herman Heijermans, beginning with Ghetto (1898) and Het zevende gebod (1899).

Her greatest success came in 1900 with the role of Kniertje in Op hoop van zegen. She played the role over 1,200 times and also portrayed in film adaptations in 1918 and 1934. Other notable Heijermans roles included Annemie in De meid (1908), Brigitta in Nocturne (1910), Eva in Eva Bonheur (1917) and Moeke in Van ouds “De Morgenster” (1923). She also appeared in plays by Ibsen, Zola, Gerhart Hauptmann and Frederik van Eeden.

== Later life and death ==
Funeral of de Boer-van Rijk in 1937

After the bankruptcy of the NTV in 1912 and the dissolution of Heijermans' later company in 1922, De Boer-van Rijk founded her own touring company, later known as the Gezelschap Esther de Boer-van Rijk. She continued to perform into old age, also leading the De Boer-van Rijk Ensemble from 1933 until shortly before her death. Despite persistent financial difficulties, she was active in charitable causes, including support for tuberculosis aftercare and Jewish organisations. She died at her home in Amsterdam on 7 September 1937 after a short illness. Her funeral procession drew thousands of people which reflectied her popularity.
