= The Good Hope (play) =

Play written by Herman Heijermans

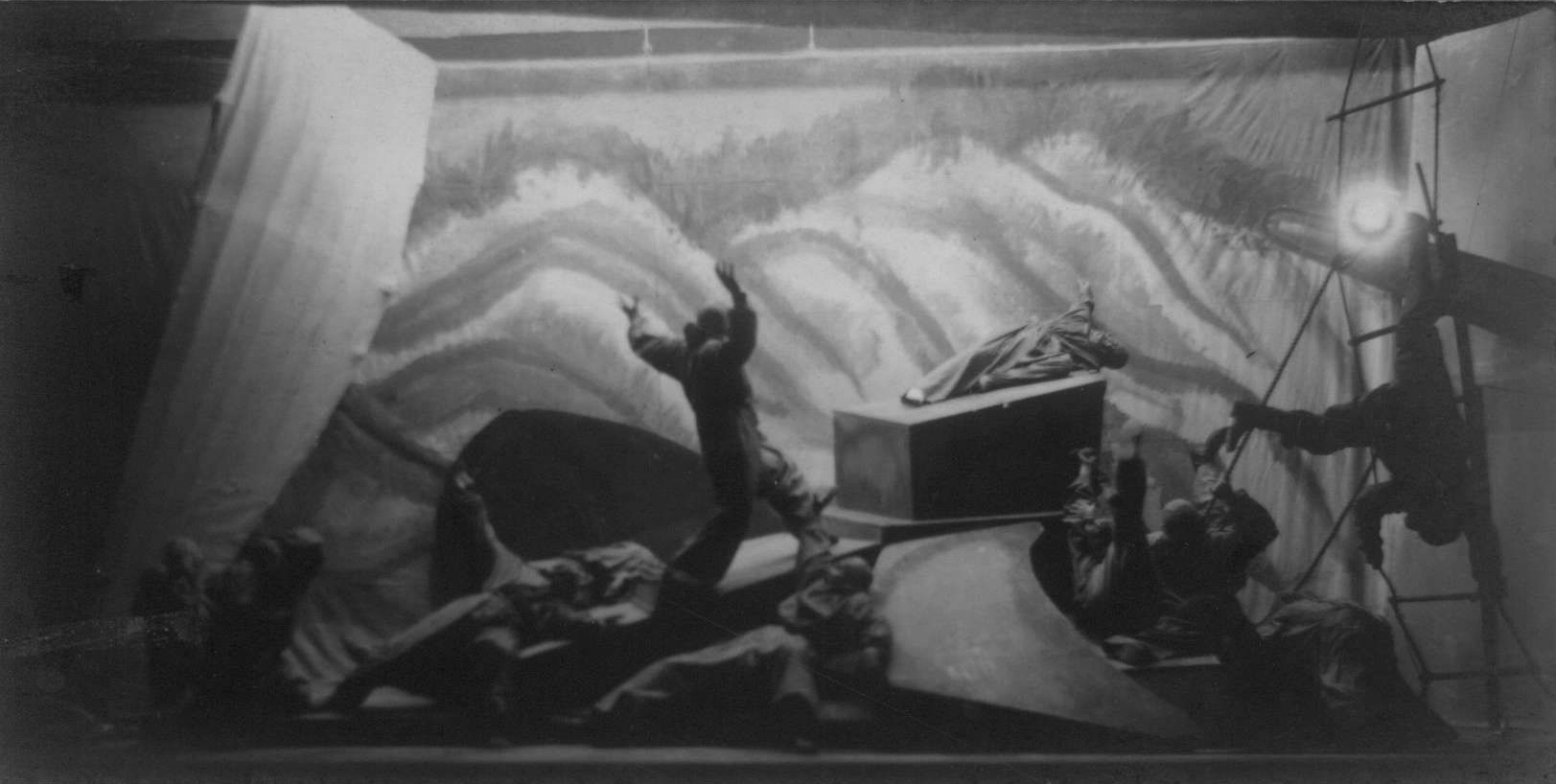
Op hoop van zegen (Fishermen scene), Ohel Theater (1927)

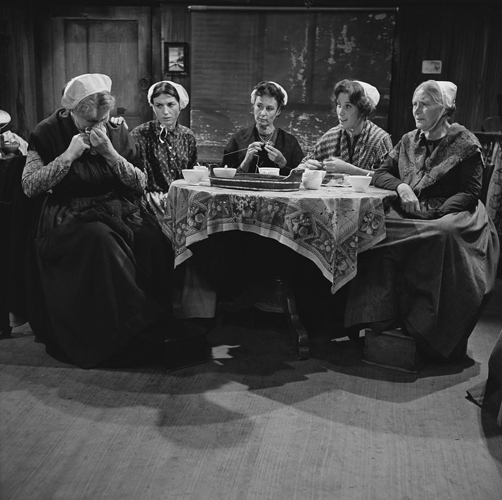
Set image with Kitty Courbois, Liane Saalborn, Hetty Verhoogt, Mimi Boesnach and Riek Schagen.

The Good Hope (from Dutch: Op hoop van zegen; more literally: Hoping for the best) is a Dutch play written by Herman Heijermans in 1900/1901.

It takes place in a fishing village, with the conflict between the fishermen and their employer ending in tragedy with the unsound boat setting out to sea and sinking with all hands and the owner pocketing the insurance money.

The play is still staged today, and remains the most popular play by Dutch dramatist Herman Heijermans. A socialist, Heijermans is considered to have meant the play as a criticism of the entire capitalist system, though some present-day productions downplay this radical approach.

The plat was translated in a new version for the Royal National Theatre in 2001, which relocated the action to the Yorkshire fishing community of Whitby in 1900, by Lee Hall.

== Plot ==
The play is set in a poor Dutch fishing village. The central character is Kniertje, an elderly widow whose husband and several sons have already been lost at sea. Despite her grief, she depends on her remaining sons to support the family.

A fishing vessel called the Op Hoop van Zegen (“Hope of Blessing”) is due to sail. The ship is old, poorly maintained, and widely believed to be unsafe. The fishermen know it is dangerous, but they have little choice: refusing to sail means unemployment and starvation.

The wealthy shipowner, Bos, refuses to repair the vessel because doing so would cost money. His concern for profit outweighs any concern for the lives of his crew. The fishermen and their families are powerless against him.

Kniertje’s two remaining sons, Geert and Barend, join the crew despite their mother’s fears. Another young woman, Clementine, hopes to marry Geert, adding a thread of personal happiness that contrasts with the looming disaster.

As expected, the neglected ship is caught in a storm and sinks. Nearly everyone aboard is lost. Kniertje loses her last two sons, leaving her completely alone.

In the play’s famous final moments, rather than calling for revenge, Kniertje responds with quiet resignation. She reflects that the poor must simply endure their suffering, saying that one must not rebel against God’s will—even though the audience clearly sees that the true cause of the tragedy is human greed and social injustice.

== Background ==
Its original Dutch title is Op Hoop Van Zegen; it was translated into English and produced as early as 1903 and produced for the first time in England by the Stage Society on 26 April 1903. Ellen Terry had it produced in all the leading towns of the English provinces and in the London suburbs in 1904 and 1905. On her American tour in 1906–07 the play was revived by her as it was later by The Pioneer Players on 3 November 1912. (Note: According to a letter of 10 May 1979 by Mrs. Anthony Thomas, curator of the Ellen Terry Memorial Museum, Tenterden, Kent.)

== Screen adaptations ==
There are four films based on the play. The most recent was made in 1986, featuring Danny de Munk as Barend.

== See also ==
- Coffin ships (insurance)
