= Louis H. Chrispijn =

Dutch actor, writer and director (1854–1926)

Louis Chrispijn sr.
- Born: Louis Hermanus Chrispijn; 13 May 1854
- Died: 1 November 1926 (aged 72)
- Years active: 1913–1915
- Spouse: Christine van Meeteren (1905-1916)

Louis H. Chrispijn, Sr. (13 May 1854, in Amsterdam – 1 November 1926, in Amsterdam) was a Dutch actor, writer, and director of both theatre and films. Together with M.H. Laddé, Willy Mullens, Maurits Binger, and Theo Frenkel, he was one of the pioneers of early Dutch cinema.

== Personal Life and Career ==
He and his wife, actress Christine van Meeteren, married in 1905 and toured the Dutch East Indies together through 1908. They were invited by Binger to join his troupe at Filmfabriek Hollandia; van Meeteren acted alongside Annie Bos in a number of comedic films about Zeeland girls, Mijntje en Trijntje. Chrispijn became Hollandia's first permanent director in 1915. He and van Meeteren divorced the following year.

== Movies (as director) ==
- De Levende ladder (1913)
- Nederland en Oranje (1913)
- Silvia Silombra (1913)
- Krates (1913)
- De Bertha (1914)
- Een telegram uit Mexico
- Zijn viool (1914)
- De zigeunerin (1914)
- De verwisseling onder het bed (1914)
- Liefde waakt (1914)
- De Bloemen, die de ziel vertroosten (1914)
- Heilig recht (1914)
- Weergevonden (1914)
- Luchtkastelen (1914)
- De Vloek van het testament (1915)
