= Louis Bouwmeester =

Dutch actor (1842–1925)

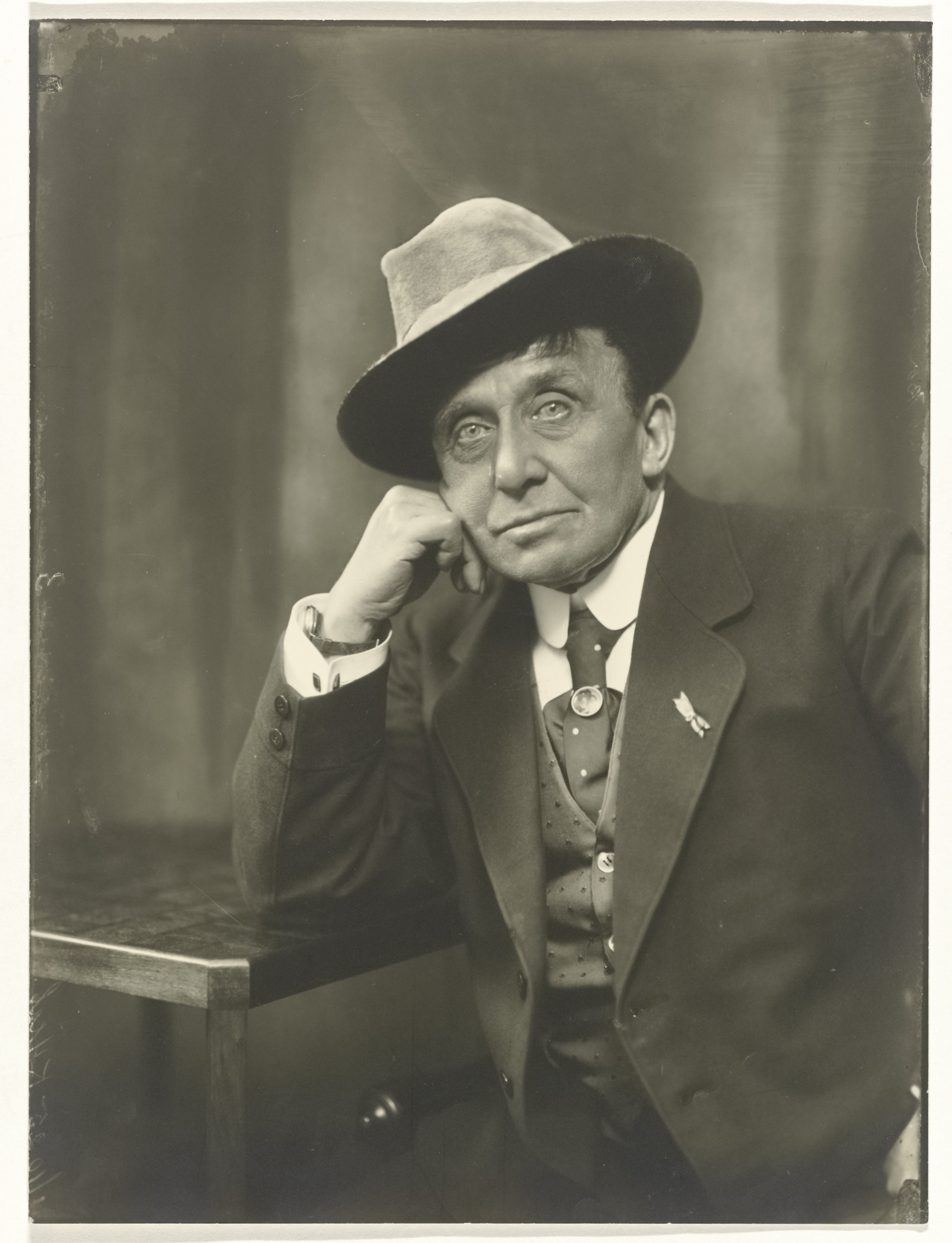
- Bouwmeester in 1913
- Born: Louis Frederik Johannes Bouwmeester; 5 September 1842; Middelharnis, Netherlands
- Died: 28 April 1925 (aged 82); Amsterdam, Netherlands
- Occupation: Actor

Louis Frederik Johannes Bouwmeester (5 September 1842 – 28 April 1925) was a Dutch actor best known for his Shakespeare interpretations. He is also known as Louis Bouwmeester Sr. for distinction from his son.

He performed several times in Vienna, London and Paris, and became popular. From 1873 to 1879, he was director of the Salon des Variétés in Amsterdam. In 1882, he received from Willem III the gold medal for Arts and Sciences. In 1902, he became director of the Haarlems Theater Company. He was a strong actor in melodramas such as De twee wezen (The Two Orphans).

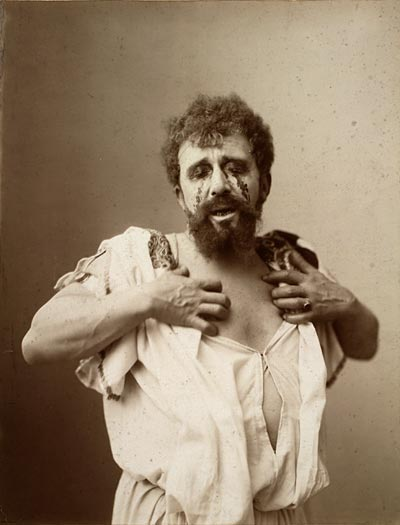
As Oedipus, 1890s

Nico de Jong gave a short speech following the death of Louis Bouwmeester. He called Bouwmeester "the friend of the Dutch theater players, an artist by God's grace, whose name will be mentioned after centuries". After his speech he asked the attendees to stand up for a moment in reverence for the deceased and to agree with him in his wish: "Louis Bouwmeester, rest in peace". The actor's death was discussed in various theaters in the Netherlands. His career was described as "extraordinary for triumph and for variety".

The stage award, the Louis d'Or, which has been awarded to the best male supporting role since 1955, was named after Bouwmeester.

Louis Bouwmeester was buried at the Zorgvlied cemetery in Amsterdam. His tomb was damaged by the end of the 20th century, a new monument was erected in the image of the old.
