= Annie Bos =

Dutch actress

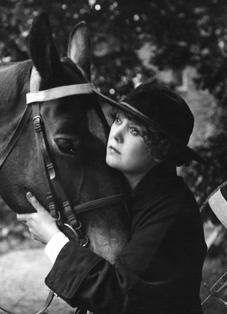
- Bos in the film Majoor Frans (1916)
- Born: Johanna Bos; 10 December 1886; Amsterdam, Netherlands
- Died: 3 August 1975 (aged 88); Leiden, Netherlands
- Years active: 1913–1924
- Spouse: Cornelis Loeff (1926-?)

Johanna "Annie" Bos (10 December 1886 – 3 August 1975) was a Dutch theater and silent film actress, known as Holland's first movie star and diva.

Bos started her acting career in Antwerp, but soon returned to the Netherlands and made her theater debut in 1909. She played mostly bit parts, until she was discovered by movie director Maurits Binger. Binger had just opened his movie studio Hollandia and contracted Bos as the leading lady of the movies. She made her first film appearance in the film De Levende Ladder. Over the next years, she became a well recognized actress, being nicknamed "the Dutch Asta Nielsen".

In 1916, Bos starred in Majoor Frans (1916) and became Holland's first star. She got opportunities to choose her own film roles and attempted to prove her acting skills by playing roles with opposite characters. However, when Hollandia neared bankruptcy in 1920, the studio was renewed and the new movie directors fired Bos, saying she was too old. Bos was offered a contract in the United States, where she was known for her role in the Dutch film Een Carmen van het Noorden (1919), which was released internationally. She arrived in New York City in 1921, where she discovered the studio she was contracted to, didn't exist anymore.

Bos stayed in the United States, attempting to get a film contract, but had no success. After playing a small role opposite Pearl White in the American film Without Fear (1922), she travelled to Germany, but didn't have any luck there either. In 1924, she moved back to the Netherlands, where an old friend gave her the lead in Mooi Juultje van Volendam (1924). The film flopped and was removed from cinemas after one week. Bos felt she didn't belong in the new film industry anymore and returned to theater. She acted in the play Madame DuBarry, which got critical claim.

Bos finally retired in 1925, to marry Cornelis Loeff. She was soon forgotten by the public. Her death in 1975 reached only one newspaper. Actress Willeke van Ammelrooy portrayed her in a play in 2006.

== Selected filmography ==
- De Levende Ladder (1913)
- Nederland en Oranje (1913)
- The Fatal Woman (1915)
- Majoor Frans (1916)
- Het Geheim van Delft (1917)
- Op Hoop van Zegen (1918)
- A Carmen of the North (1919)
- Schakels (1920, lost)
- Without Fear (1922)
- Mooi Juultje van Volendam (1924)
