= The Woman Worth Millions =

1923 film by Willi Wolff

- German: Die Frau mit den Millionen
- Directed by: Willi Wolff
- Written by: Paul Merzbach; Willi Wolff
- Produced by: Ellen Richter; Willi Wolff
- Starring: Ellen Richter; Georg Alexander; Hugo Flink
- Cinematography: Arpad Viragh
- Production company: Ellen Richter Film
- Distributed by: UFA
- Release date: 3 August 1923
- Country: Germany
- Languages: Silent; German intertitles

The Woman Worth Millions (German: Die Frau mit den Millionen) is a 1923 German silent film directed by Willi Wolff and starring Ellen Richter, Georg Alexander and Hugo Flink. It was released in three separate parts.

== Cast ==
- Ellen Richter as Smaragada Naburian
- Georg Alexander as Anatole Pigeard
- Hugo Flink as Prince Selim
- Eduard von Winterstein as Mahmud Dedim Pascha
- Charles Puffy as Leonidas Kleptomanides
- Anton Pointner as Stuart Hardington
- Adolf Klein as Prince Naburian
- Arthur Bergen as Abdul Kerim
- Leonhard Haskel as Sultan von Dagestan
- Muhsin Ertugrul as Lieutenant Erdöffy
- Hermann Picha as Hospodar of Valona
- Georg Baselt as Hospodar of Antivari
- Henry Bender
- Carl Geppert
- Karl Harbacher
- Max Kronert
- Max Laurence
- Frida Richard
