= Moral (1928 film) =

1928 film

- Directed by: Willi Wolff
- Written by: Robert Liebmann; Bobby E. Lüthge; Ludwig Thoma (play); Willi Wolff
- Starring: Ellen Richter; Ralph Arthur Roberts; Jakob Tiedtke
- Cinematography: Carl Drews
- Production company: Ellen Richter Film
- Distributed by: Deutsche Universal-Film
- Release date: 20 January 1928
- Running time: 81 minutes
- Country: Germany
- Languages: Silent; German intertitles

Moral is a 1928 German silent comedy film directed by Willi Wolff and starring Ellen Richter, Ralph Arthur Roberts and Jakob Tiedtke. It was shot at the EFA Studios in Berlin. The film's art direction was by Ernst Stern. It was released by the German subsidiary of Universal Pictures.

== Cast ==
- Ellen Richter as Ninon de Hauteville
- Ralph Arthur Roberts as Prof. Wasner
- Jakob Tiedtke as Rentier Beermann
- Fritz Greiner as Justizrat Hauser
- Julius Falkenstein as Fürst Emil von Gerolstein
- Harry Halm as Erbprinz
- Ferdinand von Alten as Kammerherr von Schmettau
- Paul Graetz as Polizeischreiber Reisacher
- Albert Paulig as Assessor Ströbel
- Hilde Jennings as Elfie Beermann
- Ernst Hofmann as Dobler
- Paul Morgan as Mitglied des Sittlichkeitsvereins
- Fritz Beckmann as Mitglied des Sittlichkeitsvereins
- Hugo Döblin as Mitglied des Sittlichkeitsvereins
- Robert Garrison
- Heinrich Gotho
- Karl Harbacher as Mitglied des Sittlichkeitsvereins
- Julius E. Herrmann as Mitglied des Sittlichkeitsvereins
- Alice Torning

== Bibliography ==
- Goble, Alan. The Complete Index to Literary Sources in Film. Walter de Gruyter, 1999.
