= The Riddle of the Sphinx (film) =

1921 film

- Directed by: Adolf Gärtner
- Written by: Artúr Somlay; Willi Wolff
- Produced by: Willi Wolff
- Starring: Ellen Richter; Erich Kaiser-Titz; Karl Günther
- Cinematography: Eugen Hamm
- Production company: Ellen Richter Film
- Distributed by: UFA
- Release date: 7 October 1921
- Country: Germany
- Languages: Silent; German intertitles

The Riddle of the Sphinx (German: Das Rätsel der Sphinx) is a 1921 German silent adventure film directed by Adolf Gärtner and starring Ellen Richter, Erich Kaiser-Titz and Karl Günther.

The film's sets were designed by the art director Hans Dreier.

== Cast ==
- Ellen Richter as Juanita di Conchitas
- Erich Kaiser-Titz as Amru, an Egyptian
- Karl Günther as Dr. Percy Grey
- Albert Patry as Prof. Grey, British Museum
- Georg John as Mummy
- Kurt Rottenburg as Dr. Edward Pattison
- Georg Baselt as Don Martunez de la Blanca
- Henry Bender as Empfangschef
- Irmgard Bern as Daisy Pattison
- Carl Geppert as Baron Kollwitz
- Károly Huszár as Fürst Popoff
- Max Kronert as Mehemed
- Maria Lux as Miss Peach
- Hermann Picha as Marquis d'Yssé

== Bibliography ==
- Berman, Nina. German Literature on the Middle East: Discourses and Practices, 1000-1989. University of Michigan Press, 2011.
