= The Adventuress of Monte Carlo =

1921 film

- Norwegian theatrical poster
- German: Die Abenteuerin von Monte Carlo
- Directed by: Adolf Gärtner
- Written by: Artúr Somlay; Willi Wolff
- Produced by: Ellen Richter; Willi Wolff
- Starring: Ellen Richter; Anton Pointner; Eduard von Winterstein
- Cinematography: Eugen Hamm
- Production company: Ellen Richter Film
- Distributed by: UFA
- Release dates: 25 November 1921 (Part I); 7 December 1921 (Part II); 16 December 1921 (Part III)
- Country: Germany
- Languages: Silent; German intertitles

The Adventuress of Monte Carlo (German: Die Abenteuerin von Monte Carlo) is a 1921 German silent adventure film directed by Adolf Gärtner and starring Ellen Richter, Anton Pointner and Eduard von Winterstein. It was released in three parts, The Mistress of the Shah, Moroccan Nights and The Stanley Trial.

The film's sets were designed by the art director Hans Dreier. Extensive location shooting took place in Monte Carlo, Morocco, Paris, Nice, Switzerland, Barcelona and Italy.

== Cast ==
- Ellen Richter as Zoraja
- Anton Pointner as Edward Stanley
- Albert Patry as De Jong
- Eduard von Winterstein as Rimay
- Charles Puffy as Ali, servant
- Kurt Rottenburg as Thiery
- Karl Günther as Prinz Luigi
- Karl Swoboda as Prokurist
- Martha Hoffmann as stewardess
- Toni Tetzlaff as Madame X
- Albert Paulig as Oberkellner
- Henry Bender as Achmed
- Magnus Stifter as Ibrahim
- Hamed ben Melusi as Ali ben Rassid
- Max Kronert as Nyhoff
- Paul Biensfeldt as Moroccan Postbeamter
- Arthur Kraußneck as Untersuchungsrichter
- Adolf Klein as chief judge
- Robert Forster-Larrinaga as defense lawyer
- Karl Harbacher as first court usher
- Hugo Hummel as second court usher
