= The Toy of the Tsarina =

- German: Das Spielzeug der Zarin
- Directed by: Rudolf Meinert
- Written by: Willi Wolff
- Starring: Ellen Richter; Karl Berger; Max Kronert
- Cinematography: A. O. Weitzenberg
- Production company: Frankfurter Film-Co
- Release date: 1919
- Country: Germany
- Languages: Silent; German intertitles

The Toy of the Tsarina (German: Das Spielzeug der Zarin) is a 1919 German silent historical drama film directed by Rudolf Meinert and starring Ellen Richter, Karl Berger, and Max Kronert.

== Cast ==
- Ellen Richter as Katharina II.
- Karl Berger as Lieutenant Tschekin
- Max Kronert as Hauptmann Wlassiew
- Hugo Falke as Lieutenant Mirowitsch
- Max Laurence as Chamberlain
- R. Mantolu as Henker
- Joseph Römer as Count Orlow
- Else Wasa as Frau von Mellin

== Bibliography ==
- Bergfelder, Tim & Bock, Hans-Michael. The Concise Cinegraph: Encyclopedia of German. Berghahn Books, 2009.
