= Friend Ripp =

1923 film

- Directed by: Alfred Halm
- Written by: Emmerich Frey; Charles Puffy
- Produced by: Charles Puffy
- Starring: Carl Geppert; Ilka Grüning; Käthe Haack
- Cinematography: Arpad Viragh
- Production company: Huszar Film
- Release date: 1923
- Country: Germany
- Languages: Silent; German intertitles

Friend Ripp (German: Freund Ripp) is a 1923 German silent film directed by Alfred Halm and starring Carl Geppert, Ilka Grüning, and Käthe Haack.

The film's sets were designed by the art director Franz Schroedter.

== Cast ==
In alphabetical order

- Carl Geppert
- Ilka Grüning
- Käthe Haack
- Harry Halm
- Karl Harbacher
- Leonhard Haskel
- Edgar Klitzsch
- Hermann Picha
- Charles Puffy
- Fritz Richard
- Fritz Spira
- Hugo Werner-Kahle
- Max Zilzer
