= Police Spy 77 =

1930 film

- German: Polizeispionin 77
- Directed by: Willi Wolff
- Written by: Ladislaus Vajda; Willi Wolff
- Produced by: Ellen Richter; Willi Wolff
- Starring: Ellen Richter; Nikolai Malikoff; Robert Garrison
- Cinematography: Willy Hameister; Erich Nitzschmann
- Production company: Ellen Richter Film
- Distributed by: National Film
- Release date: 14 March 1930
- Country: Germany
- Language: German

Police Spy 77 (German: Polizeispionin 77) is a 1930 German crime film directed by Willi Wolff and starring Ellen Richter, Nikolai Malikoff and Robert Garrison. It was shot at the Staaken Studios in Berlin and on location in Antwerp, Brussels and Paris. The film's sets were designed by the art director Walter Reimann.

== Cast ==
- Ellen Richter as Nr. 77
- Nikolai Malikoff as Police inspector Goron
- Robert Garrison as Wilhelm, Goron's assistant
- Philipp Manning as Desbarreaux, judge
- Ralph Arthur Roberts as The "beautiful Bébert"
- Yvette Darnys as his wife
- Károly Huszár (Charles Puffy) as Father Lamotte
- Ferdinand von Alten as Count Lettorières
- Jaro Fürth
- Bruno Ziener
- Hermann Böttcher
- Lotte Stein
- Heinrich Gotho
- Paul Günther
