= Paul Heidemann =

German actor and filmmaker

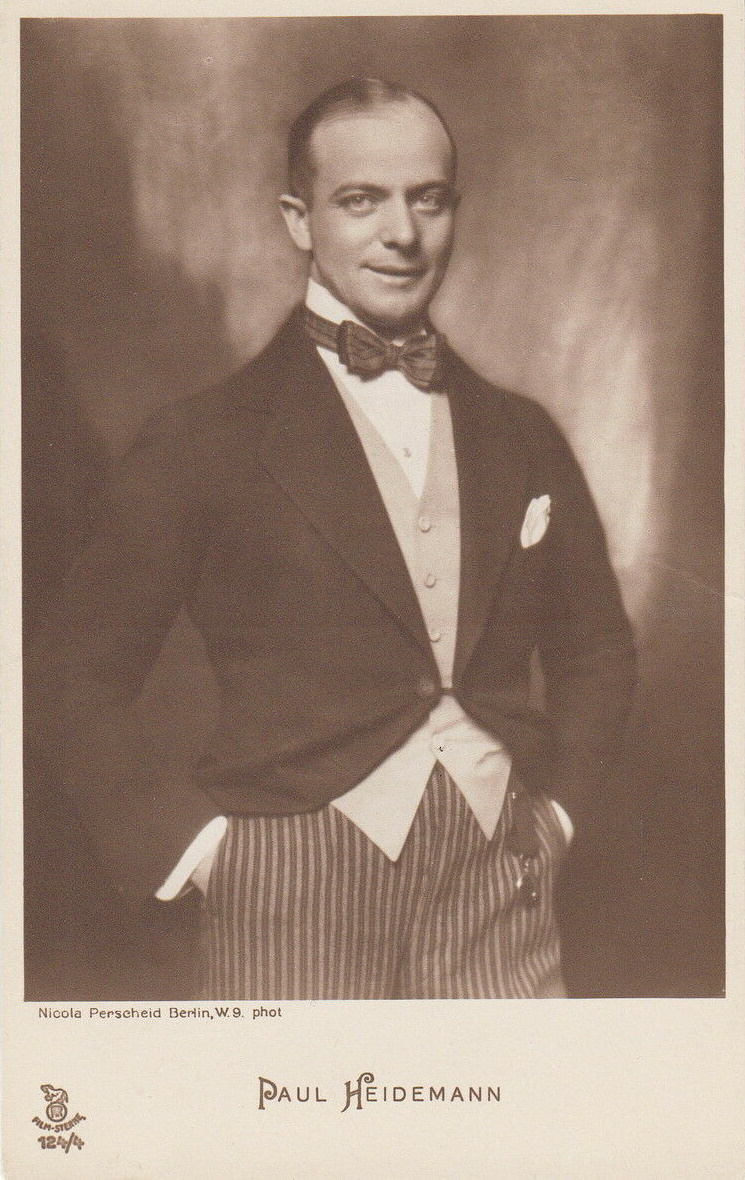
- Heidemann, ca. 1920
- Born: 26 October 1884; Cologne, German Empire
- Died: 20 June 1968 (aged 83); Berlin, West Germany
- Occupations: Actor, producer, director
- Years active: 1906–1965

Paul Heidemann (26 October 1884 – 20 June 1968) was a German actor, comedian, film director, film producer, and opera singer. As a performer, he excelled in various genres and was especially noted for his comedic skills

He was born in Cologne, Germany and died in Berlin.

After a career as a cigar merchant, he started acting lessons under the tutelage of actor Leopold Teller. Heidemann made his 1906 acting debut in Hanau in the operetta Old Heidelberg as Prince Karl-Heinz. In 1909, he sang in Bruno Granichstaeden's operettas' including Bub oder Mädel at the playhouse in Breslau.

Heidemann gained the reputation of being a talented comedian after performing in Berlin in 1911 on the recommendation of the composer Jean Gilbert. While in Berlin, he also debuted in Gilbert's play Die keusche Susanne.

In 1912, Franz Porten gave him his first leading role in Das Branmal ihrer Vergangenheit. From 1914 to 1918, he mainly played the comical characters of "Teddy" and "Paulchen". His career continued into the 1920s as he played many supporting roles with credits in over 100 films and operettas.

During World War II, Heidemann worked as a film director and stage comedian. In the 1950s he took on roles in several German productions as well some DEFA films.

== Selected filmography ==
- The Wildcat (1921)
- The Little Napoleon (1923)
- Leap Into Life (1924)
- Neptune Bewitched (1925)
- Hussar Fever (1925)
- We Belong to the Imperial-Royal Infantry Regiment (1926)
- The Third Squadron (1926)
- Maytime (1926)
- Department Store Princess (1926)
- The Mistress (1927)
- Klettermaxe (1927)
- Under the Lantern (1928)
- Escape from Hell (1928)
- The Gypsy Chief (1929)
- The Tsarevich (1929)
- The Lord of the Tax Office (1929)
- The Great Longing (1930)
- The Jumping Jack (1930)
- Love's Carnival (1930)
- Hans in Every Street (1930)
- Pension Schöller (1930)
- Her Grace Commands (1930)
- Josef the Chaste (1930)
- When the Soldiers (1931)
- Errant Husbands (1931)
- The Battle of Bademunde (1931)
- The Mad Bomberg (1932)
- The Magic Top Hat (1932)
- Gypsies of the Night (1932)
- Paprika (1932)
- Homecoming to Happiness (1933)
- Honour Among Thieves (1933)
- The Tsarevich (1933)
- The Cousin from Nowhere (1934)
- Adventure on the Southern Express (1934)
- A Woman With Power of Attorney (1934)
- Bashful Felix (1934)
- Between Two Hearts (1934)
- The Young Count (1935)
- Lessons in Love (1935)
- Peter, Paul and Nanette (1935)
- Game on Board (1936)
- The Irresistible Man (1937)
- Diamonds (1937)
- Fools in the Snow (1938)
- Wibbel the Tailor (1939)
- A Flea in Her Ear (1943)
- Madonna in Chains (1949)
- The Woman from Last Night (1950)
- Torreani (1951)
- Not Without Gisela (1951)
- Queen of the Night (1951)
- Homesick for You (1952)
- When the Heath Dreams at Night (1952)
- Street Serenade (1953)
- We'll Talk About Love Later (1953)
- Christina (1953)
- Such a Charade (1953)
- Josef the Chaste (1953)
- Captain Wronski (1954)
- My Aunt, Your Aunt (1956)
- The Model Husband (1956)
- Bärenburger Schnurre (1957)
- My Wife Makes Music (1958)
