= The Woman Without Nerves =

1930 film

- Directed by: Willi Wolff
- Written by: Willi Wolff
- Starring: Ellen Richter; Walter Janssen; Anton Pointner
- Cinematography: Willy Hameister; Erich Nitzschmann
- Production company: Ellen Richter Film
- Distributed by: Mondial-Film
- Release date: 17 January 1930
- Running time: 2427 metres
- Country: Germany
- Languages: Silent; German intertitles

The Woman Without Nerves (German: Die Frau ohne Nerven) is a 1930 German adventure film directed by Willi Wolff and starring Ellen Richter, Walter Janssen and Anton Pointner. Interiors were filmed at the Staaken Studios in Berlin. Shot during 1929, it premiered at the Marmorhaus in Berlin in January 1930.

The film's sets were designed by the art director Walter Reimann.

== Cast ==
- Ellen Richter as Ellen Seefeldt
- Walter Janssen as Eduard Lindt, Berichterstatter
- Anton Pointner as Vanderstraat
- Julius Falkenstein as Der Chefredakteur
- Henry Bender as Faktotum
- Georg John as Sekretär
- Robert Garrison
- Valy Arnheim as Pilot
- Paul Henckels
- Arthur Duarte
- Max Paetz
- Toni Tetzlaff
- Wolfgang von Schwindt

== Bibliography ==
- Bock, Hans-Michael & Bergfelder, Tim. The Concise CineGraph. Encyclopedia of German Cinema. Berghahn Books, 2009.
