= Lady Hamilton (1921 film) =

1921 film directed by Richard Oswald

- Directed by: Richard Oswald
- Written by: Heinrich Vollrath Schumacher; Richard Oswald
- Produced by: Richard Oswald
- Starring: Liane Haid; Conrad Veidt; Werner Krauss
- Cinematography: Carl Hoffmann; Károly Vass
- Production company: Richard-Oswald-Produktion
- Distributed by: National Film
- Release date: 20 October 1921
- Country: Germany
- Languages: Silent; German intertitles

Lady Hamilton is a 1921 German silent historical film directed by Richard Oswald and starring Liane Haid, Conrad Veidt and Werner Krauss. The film depicts the love affair between the British Admiral Lord Nelson and Lady Emma Hamilton. It was based on two novels by Heinrich Vollrath Schumacher. A copy of the film exists in a Russian film archive.

The film's sets were designed by the art directors Hans Dreier and Paul Leni. Location shooting took place in Hamburg, London, Naples, Rome and Venice.

== Cast ==
- Liane Haid as Lady Hamilton
- Conrad Veidt as Lord Nelson
- Werner Krauss as Lord William Hamilton
- Reinhold Schünzel as Ferdinand IV, King of Naples
- Else Heims as Marie Caroline, Queen of Naples
- Anton Pointner as Greville
- Julia Serda as Adele Nelson
- Georg Alexander as George, Prince of Wales (the later George IV)
- Paul Bildt as Francesco Caraciollo, Minister des Königs
- Theodor Loos as George Romney, ein berühmter Maler
- Hans Heinrich von Twardowski as Joshua Nesbitt, Nelsons Stiefsohn
- Gertrude Welcker as Arabella Kelly
- Adele Sandrock as Vorsteherin eines adeligen Stifts
- Kathe Oswald as Jane Middleton
- Celly de Rheydt as Phyrne
- Hugo Döblin as Doctor Graham, Kurpfuscher
- Heinrich George as Kapitän, Sir John Willett Payne
- Friedrich Kühne as Tug, Sir Johns Oberbootsmann
- Louis Ralph as Tom Kid, Matrose
- Ilka Grüning as Eine Wirtin
- Claire Krona as Emma Lyons Mutter
- Max Adalbert as drei Lazaronis
- Max Gülstorff as drei Lazaronis
- Hans Sturm as drei Lazaronis
- Rudolf Meinhard-Jünger as Friseur
- Carl Geppert as Anderer friseur
- Adolf Klein as Marineminister
- Karl Platen as Kammerdiener des Königs
- Georg John as zwei Jacobiner
- Karl Römer as zwei Jacobiner

== Bibliography ==
- Soister, John T. (2002). Conrad Veidt on Screen: A Comprehensive Illustrated Filmography. Jefferson, NC: McFarland. ISBN 978-0-7864-1289-1.
