= The Imaginary Baron =

1927 film

- Reinhold Schünzel and Marlene Dietrich (right)
- Directed by: Willi Wolff
- Written by: Robert Liebmann; Willi Wolff; Herman Haller (libretto); Alexander Siegmund Pordes (libretto)
- Produced by: Ellen Richter
- Starring: Reinhold Schünzel; Marlene Dietrich
- Cinematography: Axel Graatkjær
- Music by: Walter Kollo
- Production company: Ellen Richter Film
- Distributed by: UFA
- Release date: 4 March 1927
- Country: Germany
- Languages: Silent; German intertitles

The Imaginary Baron (German: Der Juxbaron) is a 1927 German silent comedy film directed by Willi Wolff and starring Reinhold Schünzel and Marlene Dietrich. It was made at the Tempelhof Studios in Berlin. The film's sets were designed by the art director Ernst Stern.

== Cast ==
In alphabetical order

- Henry Bender as Hugo Windisch
- Teddy Bill as Hans v. Grabow
- Colette Brettel as Hilde v. Grabow
- Marlene Dietrich as Sophie, ihre Tochter
- Heinrich Gotho as Gast im Hause
- Karl Harbacher as Stotter-Wilhelm
- Trude Hesterberg as Fränze
- Fritz Kampers as Polizist
- Albert Paulig as Baron v. Kimmel
- Hermann Picha as Landstreicher
- Reinhold Schünzel as Der Juxbaron
- Julia Serda as Zerline

== Bibliography ==
- Grange, William. Cultural Chronicle of the Weimar Republic. Scarecrow Press, 2008.
