= The Love of a Thief =

1920 German silent adventure film

- Hans Adalbert Schlettow and Ellen Richter
- Directed by: Martin Hartwig
- Written by: Willi Wolff
- Produced by: Paul Davidson
- Starring: Ellen Richter; Hans Adalbert Schlettow; Emil Rameau
- Cinematography: Frederik Fuglsang
- Production company: PAGU
- Distributed by: UFA
- Release date: 3 July 1920
- Running time: 59 minutes
- Country: Germany
- Languages: Silent; German intertitles

The Love of a Thief (German: Brigantenliebe) is a 1920 German silent adventure film directed by Martin Hartwig and starring Ellen Richter, Hans Adalbert Schlettow and Emil Rameau.

The film's sets were designed by the art director Jack Winter.

== Cast ==
- Ellen Richter as Fianetta
- Hans Adalbert Schlettow as Bandit Carlo
- Julius Falkenstein as Piselli
- Hugo Flink
- Reinhold Köstlin
- Artur Menzel
- Poldi Müller as Bianca
- Emil Rameau as Castrozzo
- Tilly Wötzel as Castrozzo's daughter

== Bibliography ==
- Grange, William. Cultural Chronicle of the Weimar Republic. Scarecrow Press, 2008.
