= Madame Pompadour (1931 film) =

1931 film

- German film poster
- German: Die Marquise von Pompadour
- Directed by: Willi Wolff
- Written by: Hans Rameau; Willi Wolff
- Produced by: Ellen Richter; Willi Wolff
- Starring: Anny Ahlers; Kurt Gerron; Walter Jankuhn
- Cinematography: Willy Hameister
- Music by: Eduard Künneke; Rudolf Nelson; Robert Stolz
- Production company: Deutsche Lichtspiel-Syndikat
- Distributed by: Deutsche Lichtspiel-Syndikat
- Release date: 8 January 1931
- Running time: 103 minutes
- Country: Germany
- Language: German

Madame Pompadour (German: Die Marquise von Pompadour) is a 1931 German historical musical film directed by Willi Wolff and starring Anny Ahlers, Kurt Gerron, and Walter Jankuhn. Part of the tradition of operetta films, it portrays the relationship between Madame de Pompadour and Louis XV. The film is not based on the operetta Madame Pompadour by Leo Fall. It was shot at the EFA Studios in Berlin while location filming took place at the Palace of Versailles. A separate French version A Caprice of Pompadour was also released.

== Cast ==
- Anny Ahlers as Marquise von Pompadour
- Kurt Gerron as Louis XV
- Walter Jankuhn as Gaston de Méville
- Ida Wüst as Frau von Estrade, her partner
- Ernö Verebes as Marcel de Clermount, cadet
- Irene Ambrus as Madelaine Biron, tutor
- Fritz Odemar as Minister Maurepas
- Hans Rameau as The Dauphin
- Wilhelm Bendow as Mélange, Pompadour's secretary
- Max Ehrlich as Cerf, court banker
- Gustl Gstettenbaur as a little cadet

== Bibliography ==
- Klaus, Ulrich J. Deutsche Tonfilme: Jahrgang 1931. Klaus-Archiv, 2006.
