= The Last Kolczaks =

1920 film

- Directed by: Alfred Halm
- Written by: Alfred Halm
- Produced by: Paul Davidson
- Starring: Victor Janson; Ellen Richter; Adele Sandrock
- Cinematography: Carl Drews
- Production company: PAGU
- Distributed by: UFA
- Release date: 25 March 1920
- Country: Germany
- Languages: Silent; German intertitles

The Last Kolczaks (German: Die letzten Kolczaks) is a 1920 German silent drama film directed by Alfred Halm and starring Victor Janson, Ellen Richter, and Adele Sandrock.

The film's sets were designed by the art director Jack Winter.

== Cast ==
- Victor Janson as Gutsherr
- Ellen Richter as Tochter des Gutsherrn
- Adele Sandrock as Mutter
- Hermann Vallentin as Verwalter

== Bibliography ==
- Hans-Michael Bock & Michael Töteberg. Das Ufa-Buch. Zweitausendeins, 1992.
