= The Teahouse of the Ten Lotus Flowers =

- German: Das Teehaus zu den zehn Lotosblumen
- Directed by: Georg Jacoby
- Written by: Willi Wolff
- Produced by: Paul Davidson
- Starring: Ellen Richter; Victor Janson; Meinhart Maur
- Cinematography: Friedrich Weinmann
- Production company: PAGU
- Distributed by: UFA
- Release date: September 1919
- Country: Germany
- Languages: Silent; German intertitles

The Teahouse of the Ten Lotus Flowers (German: Das Teehaus zu den zehn Lotosblumen) is a 1919 German silent crime film (filmed in color) directed by Georg Jacoby and starring Ellen Richter, Victor Janson and Meinhart Maur.

The film's sets were designed by the art director Kurt Richter.

== Cast ==
- Ellen Richter as Mimosa Yotamo
- Hugo Falke as Dr. van Halsten
- Victor Janson as Carlos di Terono
- Meinhart Maur as Wissenschaftler Dr. Yotamo
- Karl Morvilius as Teehausbesitzer San-Hi
- Frida Richard as Mimosa's Dienerin Beep-Po
