= The Monastery of Sendomir (1919 film) =

- Directed by: Rudolf Meinert
- Written by: Franz Grillparzer (short story); Willi Wolff
- Starring: Ellen Richter; Ernst Deutsch; Eduard von Winterstein; Max Kronert
- Cinematography: A.O. Weitzenberg
- Production company: Frankfurter Film-Co
- Release date: 1919
- Country: Germany
- Languages: Silent; German intertitles

The Monastery of Sendomir (German: Das Kloster von Sendomir) is a 1919 German silent drama film directed by Rudolf Meinert and starring Ellen Richter, Ernst Deutsch and Eduard von Winterstein. The film is based on an 1828 short story of the same title by Franz Grillparzer. The following year the story was turned into a Swedish film The Monastery of Sendomir.

The main part of the film is told in a flashback by a monk to two visiting noblemen on their way to Warsaw in the 17th century. He tells them how a mighty count named Starschensky once ruled Sendomir (Sandomierz), but after an intrigue in which his wife was unfaithful with her own cousin he had to use all his resources to build the monastery where they are now staying. At the end it is revealed that the monk is in fact Starschensky himself.

== Cast ==
- Ellen Richter - Elga von Laschek
- Ernst Deutsch
- Eduard von Winterstein
- Max Kronert
- Leopold Bauer
- Hugo Falke
- Hella Thornegg

== Bibliography ==
- Bergfelder, Tim & Bock, Hans-Michael. The Concise Cinegraph: Encyclopedia of German. Berghahn Books, 2009.
