= Immorality (film) =

1928 film

- Directed by: Willi Wolff
- Written by: Willi Wolff; Ladislaus Vajda
- Produced by: Willi Wolff
- Starring: Ellen Richter; Nicolas Rimsky; Georg Alexander
- Cinematography: Ewald Daub
- Music by: Paul Dessau
- Production company: Ellen Richter Film
- Distributed by: Vereinigte Star-Film
- Release date: 11 December 1928
- Running time: 60 minutes
- Country: Germany
- Languages: Silent; German intertitles

Immorality (German: Unmoral) is a 1928 German silent film directed by Willi Wolff and starring Ellen Richter, Nicolas Rimsky and Georg Alexander.

== Cast ==
- Ellen Richter as Yvonne Longval
- Nicolas Rimsky as Professor Thomas Barlet
- Georg Alexander as Ernest Barlet
- Kurt Gerron as Matrosenemil
- Albert Paulig as Bartels Diener
- Evi Eva as Sekretärin
- Camilla von Hollay as Darsteller aus der Operette
- Sig Arno as Darsteller aus der Operette
- Henry Bender as Darsteller aus der Operette
- Toni Tetzlaff as Darsteller aus der Operette
- Hermann Böttcher as Darsteller aus der Operette

== Bibliography ==
- Bock, Hans-Michael & Bergfelder, Tim. The Concise Cinegraph: Encyclopaedia of German Cinema. Berghahn Books, 2009.
