= Shadows of the Metropolis =

1925 film

- Directed by: Willi Wolff
- Written by: Robert Liebmann; Willi Wolff
- Produced by: Willi Wolff
- Starring: Ellen Richter; Alfred Gerasch; Walter Janssen
- Cinematography: Axel Graatkjær
- Music by: Giuseppe Becce
- Production company: Ellen Richter Film
- Distributed by: UFA.
- Release date: 16 November 1925
- Running time: 108 minutes
- Country: Germany
- Languages: Silent; German intertitles

Shadows of the Metropolis (German:Schatten der Weltstadt) is a 1925 German silent drama film directed by Willi Wolff and starring Ellen Richter, Alfred Gerasch and Walter Janssen.

The film's sets were designed by the art directors Otto Erdmann and Hans Sohnle. The film survives and has been restored by Friedrich Wilhelm Murnau Foundation.

== Cast ==
- Ellen Richter as Olly Bernard
- Alfred Gerasch as Henry Bernard, Ihr Mann
- Walter Janssen as Felix Granier
- Frida Richard as Graniers Mutter
- Philipp Manning as Minister
- Robert Garrison as Emil, genannt Eierkopf
- Harald Paulsen as Boxer Karl
- Adolf Klein as Der Gerichtspräsident
- Hugo Werner-Kahle as Prosecutor
- Karl Platen as Diener bei Bernard

== Bibliography ==
- Grange, William. Cultural Chronicle of the Weimar Republic. Scarecrow Press, 2008.
