= Ellen Richter =

Austrian actress (1891–1969)

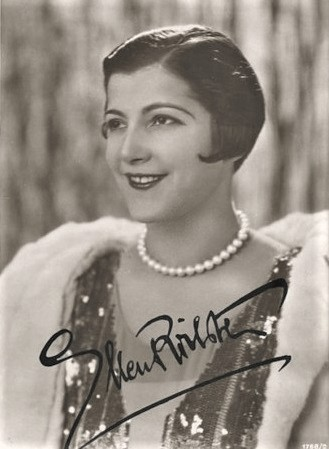
- Richter in a 1920s photo
- Born: Käthe Weiß; 21 July 1891; Vienna, Austria-Hungary
- Died: 11 September 1969 (aged 78); Düsseldorf, West Germany
- Occupations: Actress, producer
- Years active: 1915–1933
- Spouse: Willi Wolff (m. 1923; died 1947)

Ellen Richter (born Käthe Weiß; 21 July 1891 – 11 September 1969) was an Austrian film actress of the silent era. She was married to Willi Wolff, who directed many of her films. Ellen Richter composed her own production company to create her films. She worked primarily in Germany and was one of the foremost actresses of Weimar cinema.

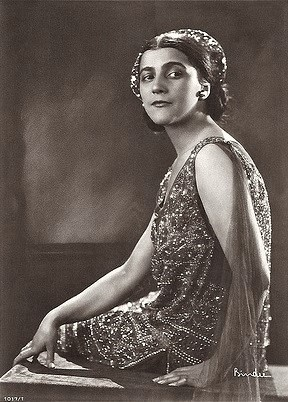
Richer c. 1918

== Selected filmography ==
- The Spy (1917)
- The Flyer from Goerz (1918)
- The Monastery of Sendomir (1919)
- The Toy of the Tsarina (1919)
- Superstition (1919)
- The Teahouse of the Ten Lotus Flowers (1919)
- Die Tochter des Mehemed (1919)
- Out of the Depths (1919)
- The Love of a Thief (1920)
- The Last Kolczaks (1920)
- Napoleon and the Little Washerwoman (1920)
- Princess Woronzoff (1920)
- Mary Tudor (1920)
- The White Death (1921)
- The Adventuress of Monte Carlo (1921)
- The Riddle of the Sphinx (1921)
- Lola Montez, the King's Dancer (1922)
- The Woman Worth Millions (1923)
- The Great Unknown (1924)
- Flight Around the World (1925)
- Shadows of the Metropolis (1925)
- The Great Duchess (1926)
- Maytime (1926)
- Heads Up, Charley (1927)
- The Imaginary Baron (1927)
- The Most Beautiful Legs of Berlin (1927)
- The Lady with the Tiger Skin (1927)
- Immorality (1928)
- Moral (1928)
- Police Spy 77 (1930)
- The Woman Without Nerves (1930)
- The Adventurer of Tunis (1931)
- Madame Pompadour (1931)
- The Secret of Johann Orth (1932)
- Manolescu, Prince of Thieves (1933)

== Bibliography ==
- Bach, Steven. Marlene Dietrich: Life and Legend. University of Minnesota Press, 2011.
- Kreimeier, Klaus. The UFA Story: A Story of Germany's Greatest Film Company 1918-1945. University of California Press, 1999.
- Rogowski, Christian. The Many Faces of Weimar Cinema: Rediscovering Germany's Filmic Legacy. Camden House, 2010.
