= Out of the Depths (1919 film) =

- German: De Profundis
- Directed by: Georg Jacoby
- Written by: Richard Henry Savage (novel My Official Wife); Willi Wolff; Georg Jacoby
- Produced by: Paul Davidson
- Starring: Ellen Richter; Olga Engl; Hugo Flink
- Cinematography: Frederik Fuglsang
- Production company: PAGU
- Distributed by: UFA
- Release date: 1919
- Country: Germany
- Languages: Silent; German intertitles

Out of the Depths (German: De Profundis) is a 1919 German silent drama film directed by Georg Jacoby and starring Ellen Richter, Olga Engl and Hugo Flink. Its Latin title refers to Psalm 130. It portrays the story of a young female anarchist who assassinates a Russian Grand Duke.

It was shot at the Tempelhof Studios in Berlin. The film's sets were designed by the art director Jack Winter.

== Cast ==
In alphabetical order

- Frau Böttcher
- Olga Engl
- Hugo Flink as Alexej
- Martin Hartwig
- Poldi Müller
- Emil Rameau as Geheimpolizei-Chef
- Ellen Richter as Sonja
- Heinrich Schroth as Amerikaner
- Hans Schweikart as Student Sergej
- Magnus Stifter as Grossfürst Ivanovitz
