= Mary Tudor (1920 film) =

1920 film

- Directed by: Adolf Gärtner
- Written by: Victor Hugo (play); Willi Wolff
- Produced by: Ellen Richter
- Starring: Ellen Richter; Hans Adalbert Schlettow; Hanni Reinwald
- Production company: Ellen Richter Film
- Release date: 2 August 1920
- Country: Germany
- Languages: Silent; German intertitles

Mary Tudor (German: Maria Tudor) is a 1920 German silent historical film directed by Adolf Gärtner and starring Ellen Richter, Hans Adalbert Schlettow and Hanni Reinwald. It is based on the play Marie Tudor by Victor Hugo. In 1922 it was given an American release under the title Judgement.

The film's sets were designed by the art director Willi Wolff.

== Cast ==
- Ellen Richter as Maria Tudor
- Hans Adalbert Schlettow as Fabiano Fabiani
- Hanni Reinwald as Jane
- Eduard von Winterstein as Simon Renard
- Friedrich Wilhelm Kaiser as Jeweller
- Carl Neisser

== Bibliography ==
- Sue Parrill & William B. Robison. The Tudors on Film and Television. McFarland, 2013.
