= The Gypsy Chief =

1929 film directed by Carl Wilhelm

- Directed by: Carl Wilhelm
- Written by: Franz Schulz
- Produced by: Gustav Althoff
- Starring: Paul Heidemann; Margarete Schlegel; Fritz Schulz; Robert Garrison
- Cinematography: Max Grix
- Production company: Aco-Film
- Distributed by: Filmhaus Bruckmann
- Release date: 27 March 1929
- Country: Germany
- Languages: Silent; German intertitles

The Gypsy Chief (German: Der Zigeunerprimas) is a 1929 German silent drama film directed by Carl Wilhelm and starring Paul Heidemann, Margarete Schlegel and Fritz Schulz. It is an adaptation of the 1912 operetta Der Zigeunerprimas composed by Emmerich Kálmán with a libretto by Julius Wilhelm and Fritz Grünbaum. Robert A. Dietrich worked as the film's art director.

== Cast ==
- Paul Heidemann as Béla Baron Cadossy
- Margarete Schlegel as Julischka
- Fritz Schulz as Gaston Graf Irini, Attaché
- Robert Garrison as Bankier Rothschild
- Hugo Flink as Dobrenko, Gesandter
- Carl Geppert as Finanzminister Mustari
- Melitta Klefer as Ungarische Magd
- Emmy Wyda as Pensionsvorsteherin
- Fritz Beckmann
- Kurt Brenkendorf
- Franz Cornelius
- Egon Dorn
- Gyula Szőreghy
- Ernő Verebes

== Bibliography ==
- Prawer, S.S. Between Two Worlds: The Jewish Presence in German and Austrian Film, 1910-1933. Berghahn Books, 2005.
