= Maytime (1926 film) =

1926 film

- Directed by: Willi Wolff
- Written by: Robert Liebmann; Willi Wolff; Rudolf Bernauer; Rudolph Schanzer
- Produced by: Ellen Richter
- Starring: Adolf Klein; Ellen Richter; Paul Heidemann
- Cinematography: Axel Graatkjær
- Music by: Artur Guttmann; Werner R. Heymann
- Production company: Ellen Richter Film
- Distributed by: UFA
- Release date: 19 August 1926
- Running time: 97 minutes
- Country: Germany
- Languages: Silent; German intertitles

Maytime or As Once in May (German: Wie einst im Mai) is a 1926 German silent romance film directed by Willi Wolff and starring Adolf Klein, Ellen Richter, and Paul Heidemann.

The film's sets were designed by the art director Paul Leni.

== Cast ==
- Adolf Klein as Baron de la Roche
- Ellen Richter as Eugenie de la Roche / Eugenie Schönlein, geb. de la Roche & Charlotte, ihre Enkelin / Mabel Ward
- Paul Heidemann as Friedrich Wilhelm Kietz / Fritz, Freds Sohn
- Hugo Fischer-Köppe as Gottlieb Krause / Gottlieb
- Frida Richard as Auguste Krause, Ehefrau / Auguste
- Philipp Manning as Kammergerichtsrat Schönlein
- Karl Harbacher as Romeo
- Trude Hesterberg as Julia
- Walter Rilla as Fred W. Kietz
- Gyula Szőreghy as Adolph Lemke
- Alice Torning as Frau Lemke
- Hermann Picha as Theophil
- Camilla Spira as Minchen Lemke, die Tochter

== Bibliography ==
- Grange, William. Cultural Chronicle of the Weimar Republic. Scarecrow Press, 2008.
- Krautz, Alfred. International directory of cinematographers, set- and costume designers in film, Volume 4. Saur, 1984.
