= The Great Duchess =

1926 film

- Directed by: Willi Wolff
- Written by: Ernst Klein (novel); Robert Liebmann; Willi Wolff
- Produced by: Ellen Richter; Willi Wolff
- Starring: Ellen Richter; Adolf Klein; Evi Eva
- Cinematography: Sophus Wangøe
- Music by: Eduard Prasch
- Production company: Ellen Richter Film
- Distributed by: UFA
- Release date: 29 January 1926
- Country: Germany
- Languages: Silent; German intertitles

The Great Duchess (German: Die tolle Herzogin) is a 1926 German silent film directed by Willi Wolff and starring Ellen Richter, Adolf Klein and Evi Eva.

The film's art direction was by Otto Erdmann and Hans Sohnle.

== Cast ==
- Ellen Richter as Herzogin Gloria
- Adolf Klein as Herzog von Burnham
- Evi Eva as Lady Grace Neville
- Alfred Gerasch as Graf Las Valdas
- Walter Janssen as Lord Neville
- Henry Bender as Spielsaalsdirektor
- Heinrich Schroth as Steenberg
- Jack Trevor as Abentuerer
- Louis Brody
