= Emil Rameau =

German actor (1878–1957)

- Born: Emil Pulvermacher; 13 August 1878; Berlin, German Empire
- Died: 9 September 1957 (aged 79); West Berlin, West Germany
- Years active: 1898–1957

Emil Rameau (born Emil Pulvermacher; 13 August 1878 – 9 September 1957) was a German film and theatre actor, and for many years the deputy artistic director at the Schiller Theater. He appeared in nearly 100 films between 1915 and 1949.

== Life and career ==
After his graduation from Realschule Rameau became an actor. His first role was Marcellus in Julius Caesar in Bromberg (today Bydgoszcz in Poland). In 1906 he went to the Schiller Theater in Berlin, where he worked with Leopold Jessner. From 1923 until 1931 he was the deputy artistic director at the Schiller theatre. He directed some plays at the Volksbühne. Rameau worked also with Max Reinhardt at the Deutsches Theater. He made his film debut in 1915 and appeared regularly in German silent films, mostly in character roles.

After the Nazis seized power in 1933, Rameau escaped through Switzerland, the Netherlands, Italy, and Great Britain to the United States. During the Second World War, he made small appearances in over 20 Hollywood movies. In the 1944 mystery-thriller Gaslight, Rameau played Maestro Guardi, Ingrid Bergman's Italian singing teacher, which was perhaps his most recognised role in Hollywood. He made his last film appearance in Hollywood in 1949 and returned to Germany, where he worked as a stage actor. In 1951, he was appointed deputy artistic director of the Schiller theatre.

== Selected filmography ==
- Der Fall Klerk (1916) - Jan Klerk
- Arthur Imhoff (1916) - Ernst Kerber
- Der Sekretär der Königin (1916)
- Abseits vom Glück (1916) - Joachim, Graf von Olmerode
- Das goldene Friedelchen (1916) - Caspar, Diener bei Ferdinand Strecker
- The Wandering Light (1916) - Major von Glassner
- The Uncanny House (1916) - Herr Eibner
- Der chinesische Götze - Das unheimliche Haus, 3. Teil (1916) - Chinesischer Priester
- Freitag, der 13. - Das unheimliche Haus, 2. Teil (1916) - Eibner
- Friedrich Werders Sendung (1916)
- The Man in the Mirror (1916)
- Das Leid der Liebe (1916)
- Life Is a Dream (1916) - Vater
- Das Kind des Anderen (1916)
- Stein unter Steinen (1917) - Steinmetz Zarncke
- Der standhafte Benjamin (1917)
- Für die Ehre des Vaters (1917) - Arbeiter Wendelin
- Der lebende Leichnam (1918) - Iwan Makarowitsch
- Die Singende Hand (1918) - Ministerpräsident
- The Sign of Guilt (1918) - Kapitän Vernon
- The Devil (1918)
- Strandgut oder Die Rache des Meeres (1918)
- Das Alte Bild (1918)
- Die rote Herzogin (1919) - Guido Ferrari - Maler
- Zwischen Tod und Leben (1919) - Valentin
- Wehrlose Opfer (1919)
- Hedda's Rache (1919) - Ludwig Gerlach, Kaufmann
- The Panther Bride (1919) - Dr. Duffoir
- Die Dame im Auto (1919) - Torleif Hansen - Makler
- The Mask (1919)
- The Spies (1919) - Dr. Mahon
- Jettatore (1919) - Fürst Jellinow
- Die Tochter des Bajazzo (1919)
- Lillis Ehe (1919) - Baumeister Stein
- Lilli (1919) - Baumeister Stein
- The Devil and the Madonna (1919) - Meister Tradler
- Sins of the Parents (1919)
- Der Tempel der Liebe (1919)
- Der Kampf um die Ehe - 2. Teil: Feindliche Gatten (1919)
- Der Kampf um die Ehe - 1. Teil: Wenn in der Ehe die Liebe stirbt (1919) - Lisas Father
- Out of the Depths (1919) - Geheimpolizei-Chef
- Hypnosis (1920) - Peter Hain
- Der rote Henker (1920) - Marquis von Brichauteau
- Prinzesschen (1920) - Hofarzt
- Indian Revenge (1920) - 2. Inder
- The Love of a Thief (1920)
- The White Peacock (1920) - Alter
- Föhn (1920) - Gutsbesitzer von Rodius
- Princess Woronzoff (1920)
- Themis (1920)
- Madame Récamier (1920) - Dufrand
- Die Benefiz-Vorstellung der vier Teufel (1920)
- Entblätterte Blüten (1920)
- Colombine (1920)
- The Maharaja's Favourite Wife (1921) - Vater des Maharadscha
- Die große und die kleine Welt (1921)
- Der tote Gast (1921)
- Sturmflut des Lebens (1921) - Arzt
- Das gestohlene Millionenrezept (1921)
- Roswolsky's Mistress (1921) - Kapellmeister
- Die sterbende Stadt (1921) - Prof. Gottlieb Wiesinger
- The Railway King (1921)
- Your Brother's Wife (1921)
- Der Fluch des Schweigens (1922)
- His Excellency from Madagascar (1922)
- The Curse of Silence (1922) - Friscard
- Monna Vanna (1922) - Frederigo Fondalo
- Lola Montez, the King's Dancer (1922)
- The Treasure of Gesine Jacobsen (1923) - Jörg, Olafs Diener
- Der allmächtige Dollar (1923)
- William Tell (1923) - Der Kanzler
- Vineta. Die versunkene Stadt (1923)
- The Hungarian Princess (1923)
- The Sensational Trial (1923) - Untersuchungsrichter
- Struggle for the Soil (1925) - Moses Hirsch
- Love's Finale (1925) - Professor Troste
- ...und es lockt ein Ruf aus sündiger Welt (1925)
- The Mill at Sanssouci (1926) - General Winterfeldt
- The Wiskottens (1926) - Der Färber Barthelmes
- Frauen, die den Weg verloren (1926) - Legationsrat von Wallburg
- Carnival Magic (1927) - Der Großvater
- Stolzenfels am Rhein (1927) - Murat
- Yacht of the Seven Sins (1928) - Bürovorsteher
- Das deutsche Lied (1928) - Heinrich von der Vogelweide
- Möblierte Zimmer (1929) - Chef des Warenhauses
- Only on the Rhine (1930) - Der Bürgermeister
- The Adventurer of Tunis (1931) - Prokurist bei Bertell
- Manolescu, der Fürst der Diebe (1933)
- The Shanghai Gesture (1941) - Roulette Player (uncredited)
- Mission to Moscow (1943) - Ignacy Paderewski (uncredited)
- Gaslight (1944) - Maestro Guardi
- Greenwich Village (1944) - Kavosky
- The Conspirators (1944) - Professor Wingby (uncredited)
- Her Highness and the Bellboy (1945) - Mr. Korb (uncredited)
- Scotland Yard Investigator (1945) - Prof. Renault
- Two Sisters from Boston (1946) - Nervous Conductor (uncredited)
- Two Smart People (1946) - Riverboat Waiter (uncredited)
- So Dark the Night (1946) - Pere Cortot
- The Return of Monte Cristo (1946) - Florist (uncredited)
- The Ghost Goes Wild (1947) - Prof. Jacques Dubonnet
- Time Out of Mind (1947) - Alfred Stern
- Where There's Life (1947) - Dr. Josefsberg
- The Main Street Kid (1948) - Max
- Arch of Triumph (1948) - Mr. Schultz (uncredited)
- Cry of the City (1948) - Dr. Niklas (uncredited)
- The Great Sinner (1949) - Fearful Old Man (uncredited)
- Sword in the Desert (1949) - Old Man - Dov's Father
- The Red Danube (1949) - Proprietor (uncredited)
- The Lady Takes a Sailor (1949) - Dr. Mittenwald (uncredited) (final film role)
