= Superstition (1919 film) =

- Directed by: Georg Jacoby
- Written by: Georg Jacoby
- Produced by: Paul Davidson
- Starring: Ellen Richter; Victor Janson
- Cinematography: Friedrich Weinmann
- Production company: PAGU
- Distributed by: UFA
- Release date: September 1919
- Country: Germany
- Languages: Silent; German intertitles

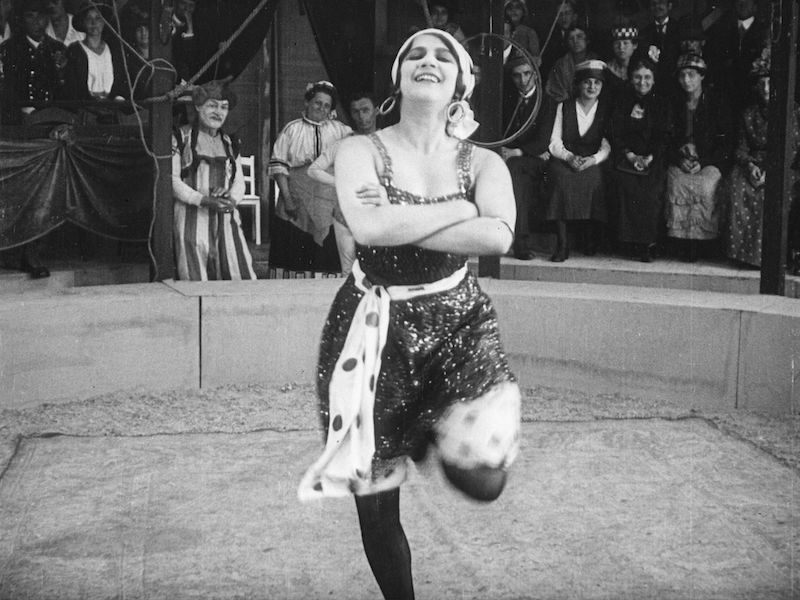
Ellen Richter in Aberglaube (1919)

Superstition (German: Aberglaube) is a 1919 German silent drama film directed by Georg Jacoby and starring Ellen Richter and Victor Janson.

The story begins at the circus where dancer Militza works. A jealous clown, Bajazzo stabs one of Militza's admirers to death. Militza escapes to the country village of Marienhagen, finding shelter in the house of a local Catholic priest. The priest also falls for Militza. When he is subsequently struck dead by a bolt of lightning one evening during Mass, his mother blames Militza and has her cast out of the village. On her way to the city, Militza joins a theatrical troupe. The leader of the troupe is disappointed with the general lack of artistic talent and begs Militza to leave with him. However, since he has a wife and two small children living in poverty, Militza refuses, and instead flees on her own. She survives a shipwreck, rescued by a nobleman who takes her to his country estate. Here she is able to recover from the traumatic events, finding peace and true love with the nobleman. As it turns out, however, her new home is located very close to the village where she was cast away after the death of the priest, whose vengeful mother learns kindles fear, anger, and superstition among the villagers. She even goes as far to accuse Militza of being a witch and a vampire who must be destroyed. In the end, the peasants, whipped up into an angry mob, start a riot, and Militza is stoned to death.

An incomplete vintage Dutch release print, missing about one third of the original length, was identified in the nitrate collection of the Eye Filmmuseum in Amsterdam in January 2020. A black & white preservation negative and a Desmetcolor print were subsequently produced at Haghefilm Digitaal, with funding generously provided by the Sunrise Foundation for Education and the Arts. This restoration was screened at the Giornate del Cinema Muto in 2021.

== Cast ==
- Ellen Richter as Zigeunerin Militza
- Victor Janson as Bajazzo
- Johannes Müller as Priester
- Frieda Richter as Mutter des Priesters
- Frida Richard as Mutter des Priesters
- Peggy Longard

== Bibliography ==
- Bock, Hans-Michael & Bergfelder, Tim. The Concise CineGraph. Encyclopedia of German Cinema. Berghahn Books, 2009.
