= Heinrich Gotho =

Austrian actor (1872–1938)

- Born: May 3, 1872; Dolina, Kingdom of Galicia and Lodomeria, Austria-Hungary
- Died: August 28, 1938 (aged 66); Berlin, Germany
- Other name: Heinrich Gottesmann
- Occupation: Actor
- Years active: 1912–1933 (film)
- Spouse: Klara Luise Auguste Müller
- Father: Leo Gottesmann

Heinrich Gotho (May 3, 1872 – August 28, 1938) was an Austrian film actor. Born in Dolina (now in Ukraine), he started his acting career at some provincial theatres until he found an engagement at the Neues Volkstheater in Berlin. The character actor appeared in over 50 films between 1922 and 1933, mostly in smaller roles. He notably appeared in numerous films by director Fritz Lang, among them Dr. Mabuse the Gambler (1922), Metropolis (1927) and M (1931). Gotho was forced to retire from film acting in 1933; as a Jew, he could no longer work owing to Nazi anti-Semitism. He died in 1938 in the Jewish Hospital of Berlin-Wedding.

== Partial filmography ==
- Die Mauritiusmarke (1912)
- Dr. Mabuse the Gambler (1922) - (uncredited)
- The Stowaway (1922)
- The False Dimitri (1922) - Schamanenzauberer
- Princess Suwarin (1923)
- Schatten – Eine nächtliche Halluzination (1923) - Violinist (uncredited)
- Man Against Man (1924)
- The Tower of Silence (1924) - porter at Aviation Society (uncredited)
- The Gentleman Without a Residence (1925) - zweiter Professor
- Mit dem Auto ins Morgenland (1926) - Redakteur
- Metropolis (1927) - Zermonienmeister - Master of Ceremonies (uncredited)
- The Imaginary Baron (1927) - Gast im Hause
- His Late Excellency (1927) - Hofcharge
- Grand Hotel (1927)
- Weekend Magic (1927) - Der Eisverkäufer
- Die raffinierteste Frau Berlins (1927) - Der Kompagnon
- The Love of Jeanne Ney (1927) - Man in Train
- The Merry Vineyard (1927) - Rindsfuß, Weinhändler
- Die 3 Niemandskinder (1927) - Hofmarschall
- Moral (1928)
- The Duty to Remain Silent (1928) - Der Diener
- The Beaver Coat (1928) - Mittendorf
- Spione (1928) - Burton Jason's Other Assistant (uncredited)
- Love's Masquerade (1928)
- The Shop Prince (1928)
- The Insurmountable (1928)
- The Saint and Her Fool (1928) - Märt
- Volga Volga (1928)
- Accident (1928, Short)
- The Age of Seventeen (1929)
- My Heart is a Jazz Band (1929) - Reggie
- What a Woman Dreams of in Springtime (1929)
- Yes, Yes, Women Are My Weakness (1929)
- Come Back, All Is Forgiven (1929)
- The Ship of Lost Souls (1929) - Ein Matrose - A Sailor
- Woman in the Moon (1929) - Der Mieter vom II. Stock
- Wenn Du noch eine Heimat hast (1930)
- Rooms to Let (1930) - Herr Piefke
- People in the Fire (1930)
- Police Spy 77 (1930)
- Love in the Ring (1930)
- Das Mädel aus U.S.A. (1930)
- Liebeskleeblatt (1930)
- Dance Into Happiness (1930) - Oskar Hübner, Briefträger
- The Forester's Daughter (1931) - Ein Notar
- Mary (1931)
- M (1931) - passer-by who tells a kid the time (uncredited)
- Das Millionentestament (1932)
- Laughing Heirs (1933) - Verwandter bei der Testamentseröffnung (uncredited)
- The Testament of Dr. Mabuse (1933)
- Schüsse an der Grenze (1933)
- Ein Unsichtbarer geht durch die Stadt (1933) - Schalterbeamter an der Pferderennbahn

== Bibliography ==
- Waldman, Harry. Maurice Tourneur: The Life and Films. McFarland, 2001.
