= The Great Unknown (1924 film) =

1924 film

- Directed by: Willi Wolff
- Written by: Paul Merzbach; Willi Wolff
- Produced by: Ellen Richter; Willi Wolff
- Starring: Lydia Potechina; Ellen Richter; Leopold von Ledebur
- Cinematography: Max Schneider
- Production company: Ellen Richter Film
- Distributed by: UFA
- Release date: 18 January 1924
- Country: Germany
- Languages: Silent; German intertitles

The Great Unknown (German:Die große Unbekannte) is a 1924 German silent drama film directed by Willi Wolff and starring Lydia Potechina, Ellen Richter and Leopold von Ledebur.

The film's sets were designed by the art director Hans Dreier.

== Cast ==
- Georg Baselt
- Harry Hardt
- Leopold von Ledebur
- Rudolf Lettinger
- Hans Wassmann
- Charles Puffy
- Lydia Potechina
- Georg Alexander
- Hans Junkermann
- Ellen Richter

== Bibliography ==
- Grange, William. Cultural Chronicle of the Weimar Republic. Scarecrow Press, 2008.
