= Princess Woronzoff =

1920 film

- Directed by: Adolf Gärtner
- Written by: Willi Wolff
- Produced by: Ellen Richter
- Starring: Ellen Richter; Hugo Flink; Rudolf Forster
- Cinematography: Arpad Viragh
- Production company: Ellen Richter Film
- Distributed by: UFA
- Release date: 6 October 1920
- Country: Germany
- Languages: Silent; German intertitles

Princess Woronzoff (German: Die Fürstin Woronzoff) is a 1920 German silent adventure film directed by Adolf Gärtner and starring Ellen Richter, Hugo Flink and Rudolf Forster.

The film's sets were designed by the art director Hans Dreier.

== Cast ==
- Ellen Richter
- Hugo Flink
- Rudolf Forster
- Artúr Somlay
- Emil Rameau
- Toni Tetzlaff
- Lotte Davis
- Alexander Ekert

== Bibliography ==
- Bock, Hans-Michael & Bergfelder, Tim. The Concise CineGraph. Encyclopedia of German Cinema. Berghahn Books, 2009.
