= Flight Around the World =

1925 film

- Directed by: Willi Wolff
- Written by: Robert Liebmann; Willi Wolff
- Produced by: Ellen Richter; Willi Wolff
- Starring: Ellen Richter; Reinhold Schünzel; Bruno Kastner
- Cinematography: Werner Brandes
- Production company: Ellen Richter Film
- Distributed by: UFA
- Release date: 6 March 1925
- Country: Germany
- Languages: Silent; German intertitles

Flight Around the World (German: Der Flug um den Erdball) is a 1925 German silent adventure film directed by Willi Wolff and starring Ellen Richter, Reinhold Schünzel, and Bruno Kastner. It was released in two parts. It was shot at the Halensee Studios in Berlin. The film's sets were designed by the art directors Otto Erdmann and Hans Sohnle

== Cast ==
- Ellen Richter as Eleonore Rix
- Reinhold Schünzel as Louis Renard
- Bruno Kastner
- Anton Pointner as Henry Turner
- Hans Brausewetter as Paul Piquet
- Max Landa
- Cläre Lotto as Elisa Pakrenos
- Paul Biensfeldt as Werner Rix
- Henry Bender
- Hermann Picha

== Bibliography ==
- Grange, William (2008). Cultural Chronicle of the Weimar Republic. Lanham, MD: Scarecrow Press. ISBN 978-0-8108-5967-8.
