= The Adventurer of Tunis =

1931 film directed by Willi Wolff

- Directed by: Willi Wolff
- Written by: Hans Rameau; Willi Wolff
- Starring: Philipp Manning; Theo Shall; Ellen Richter
- Cinematography: Otto Kanturek
- Edited by: Carl Otto Bartning
- Music by: Vincent Scotto
- Production company: Deutsche Lichtspiel-Syndikat
- Distributed by: Deutsche Lichtspiel-Syndikat
- Release date: 10 September 1931
- Running time: 105 minutes
- Country: Germany
- Language: German

The Adventurer of Tunis (German: Die Abenteurerin von Tunis) is a 1931 German adventure film directed by Willi Wolff and starring Philipp Manning, Theo Shall, and Ellen Richter. It was made at the Staaken Studios in Berlin. Location shooting took place in Marseille and Nice in France, Genoa and the Italian Riviera and in Tunis and the Sahara Desert. The film's art direction was by Robert Neppach and Willy Schiller.

== Synopsis ==
During an Arab uprising in North Africa, the European employees of a copper mine are besieged and need urgent help. When his government refuses to provide military assistance, the firm's Parisian owner sends his nephew Henry Bertell with weapons and ammunition. A rival company is behind the uprising, and sends one of its agents, a dancer named Collette, to seduce Henry and foil his mission. However, as they travel through Southern France, she falls in love with him and changes sides.

== Cast ==
- Philipp Manning as Henry Bertell
- Theo Shall as René
- Ellen Richter as Colette, a dancer
- Charles Puffy as Emil Dupont
- Senta Söneland as Agathe - Bertell's wife
- Ferdinand Hart as Valera
- Leonard Steckel as Ferrero
- Rosa Valetti as Madame Rosa
- Heinrich Marlow as Martini
- Hans Hermann Schaufuß as First Police Commissioner
- Julius Falkenstein as Second Police Commissioner
- Aruth Wartan as Man from the Levante
- Henry Bender as Portier bei Bertell
- Emil Rameau as Prokurist bei Bertell

== Bibliography ==
- Klaus, Ulrich J. Deutsche Tonfilme: Jahrgang 1931. Klaus-Archiv, 2006.
