= The Count of Charolais =

1922 film directed by Karl Grune

- Directed by: Karl Grune
- Written by: Bobby E. Lüthge; Richard Beer-Hofmann (play Der Graf von Charolais, 1904); Philip Massinger (play The Fatal Dowry, 1632); Nathan Field (play The Fatal Dowry, 1632)
- Starring: Eva May; William Dieterle
- Cinematography: Karl Hasselmann
- Production company: Stern-Film
- Release date: 8 September 1922
- Country: Germany
- Languages: Silent; German intertitles

The Count of Charolais (German: Der Graf von Charolais) is a 1922 German silent historical film directed by Karl Grune and starring Eva May, William Dieterle and Eugen Klöpfer. The film was adapted from the play of the same name by Richard Beer-Hofmann.

The film's sets were designed by the art directors Karl Görge and Robert Neppach.

== Cast ==
- Eva May as Désirée
- William Dieterle as Junge Charolais
- Eugen Klöpfer as Senatspräsident
- Maria Forescu
- Georg Baselt
- Paul Biensfeldt as Herbergswirt
- Wilhelm Diegelmann
- Hugo Döblin
- Carl Geppert
- Leonhard Haskel
- Hildegard Imhof
- Fred Immler as Tambour
- Joseph Klein as Graf von Charolais
- Arthur Kraußneck
- Margarete Kupfer as Alte Barbara
- Adolf E. Licho as Wucherer
- Fritz Richard
- Rudolf Rittner as Hauptmann Romont
- Josef Schelepa
- Ferdinand von Alten as Graf Philipp
- Max Wilmsen

== Bibliography ==
- James Robert Parish & Kingsley Canham. Film Directors Guide: Western Europe. Scarecrow Press, 1976.
