= In der Heimat, da gibt's ein Wiedersehn =

1926 film

- Advertising material featuring Margot Landa and Reinhold Schünzel
- Directed by: Leo Mittler; Reinhold Schünzel
- Written by: Heinz Gordon; Bobby E. Lüthge
- Produced by: Reinhold Schünzel
- Starring: Margot Landa; Reinhold Schünzel; Margit Barnay
- Cinematography: Ludwig Lippert
- Production company: Reinhold Schünzel Film
- Distributed by: UFA
- Release date: 23 December 1926
- Country: Germany
- Languages: Silent; German intertitles

In der Heimat, da gibt's ein Wiedersehn! (English: "We'll meet again in the Homeland") is a 1926 German silent film directed by Leo Mittler and Reinhold Schünzel. It shares its name with a popular song title.

The film's art direction is by Fritz Kraenke and Karl Machus.

== Cast ==
- Reinhold Schünzel as Gustav Knospe
- Margot Landa as Toinette
- Margit Barnay as Herta
- Johannes Riemann as Dr. Ernst Körner
- Sig Arno as Siegfried
- Carl Wallauer as Klotz, Haptmann d. R.
- Fritz Kampers as Lemke, Unteroffizier
- Julius Falkenstein as Hauptmann von Falke
- Jakob Tiedtke as Hoher Offizier
- Otto Wallburg as Feldwebel Baumann
- Paul Morgan as Soldat
- Olga Engl as Frau Professor Körner
- Max Ehrlich as Samuel Kronheim
- Daisy Torrens as Rosa Kronheim
- Trude Lehmann as Frau Lemke
- Paul Westermeier as Ede, Budiker
- Blandine Ebinger as Paula
- Hugo Werner-Kahle as Max Wiedlack
- Fritz Beckmann as Freund
- Ludwig Stössel as Freund
- Karl Etlinger as Krüger, Prokurist bei Klotz
- Charles Lincoln as Leutnant
- Frigga Braut as Magdalene Pickard
- Rudolf Jünger as Soldat
- Carl Geppert as Soldat
- Neumann-Schüler as Soldat
- Karl Wallauer

== Bibliography ==
- Ashkenazi, Ofer. Weimar Film and Modern Jewish Identity. Palgrave Macmillan, 2012.
