= You Walk So Softly =

1927 film

- Directed by: Reinhold Schünzel
- Written by: Heinz Gordon; Reinhold Schünzel
- Produced by: Reinhold Schünzel
- Starring: Reinhold Schünzel; Yvette Darnys; Jakob Tiedtke; Julius Falkenstein
- Cinematography: Ludwig Lippert
- Production company: Universum Film AG
- Distributed by: Universum Film AG
- Release date: 21 December 1927
- Country: Germany
- Languages: Silent; German intertitles

You Walk So Softly (German: Gustav Mond, Du gehst so stille) is a 1927 German silent comedy film directed by Reinhold Schünzel and starring Schünzel, Yvette Darnys and Jakob Tiedtke. Schünzel ran into trouble with his superiors at UFA because he had not submitted his screenplay for approval before filming began. The film's art direction was by Erich Czerwonski.

== Cast ==
- Reinhold Schünzel as Gustav Mond
- Yvette Darnys as Fräulein Vilma Duval
- Jakob Tiedtke as Der Onkel aus Afrika
- Julius Falkenstein as Der Baron
- Julius E. Herrmann as Der Bankdirektor
- Ferdinand Bonn as August Krause
- Valeska Stock as Mutter Krause
- Käthe von Nagy as Frieda Krause
- Paul Kretschmar as 1. Bruder von Frieda Krause
- Richard Kretschmar as 2. Bruder von Frieda Krauses
- Else Reval as Georgette
- Eva Haltern as Georgettes Töchterchen
- Ferdinand Hart as Emil
- Henry Bender as Ein Oberwachtmeister
- Carl Geppert as Ein Wachtmeister
- Alice Hechy as Ein zweifelhaftes Mädchen

== Bibliography ==
- Kreimeier, Klaus. The Ufa Story: A History of Germany's Greatest Film Company, 1918-1945. University of California Press, 1999.
