= The Lady with the Tiger Skin =

1927 German silent film

- Scene from a film
- German: Die Dame mit dem Tigerfell
- Directed by: Willi Wolff
- Written by: Ernst Klein (novel); Robert Liebmann
- Starring: Ellen Richter; Mary Kid; Georg Alexander
- Cinematography: Axel Graatkjær
- Production company: Ellen Richter Film
- Distributed by: UFA
- Release date: 12 October 1927
- Country: Germany
- Languages: Silent; German intertitles

The Lady with the Tiger Skin (German: Die Dame mit dem Tigerfell) is a 1927 German silent film directed by Willi Wolff and starting Ellen Richter, Mary Kid and Georg Alexander.

The film's art direction is by Ernst Stern.

== Cast ==
- Ellen Richter as Lady Portin, alias Ellen Garet
- Mary Kid
- Georg Alexander as Lord Abbot
- Bruno Kastner as Count Charles Bremer
- Heinrich Schroth as Henry Seymor
- Alfred Gerasch as Senior Santos
- Kurt Gerron as Meyers
- Evi Eva
