= Axel Graatkjær =

Danish silent film cinematographer (1885–1969)

- Born: 19 January 1885; Århus, Denmark
- Died: 11 November 1969 (aged 84); Copenhagen, Denmark
- Other name: Axel Sørensen
- Occupation: Cinematographer
- Years active: 1906–1930

Axel Graatkjær (1885–1969) was a Danish cinematographer who worked on silent films during the Golden Age of Danish cinema. Graatkjær was the favorite cinematographer of film director August Blom as well as silent film star Asta Nielsen and her husband, director Urban Gad. He filmed more than 100 films during his career from 1906 to 1930.

== Career ==
Axel Graatkjær was born Axel Sørensen on 19 January 1885 in Århus, Denmark. During his late teens, Graatkjær moved to Copenhagen for an education in music. In order to pay for his music studies, he worked as a ticket and program seller at the Biograf movie theater where he developed an interest in film making. In 1906, Graatkjær shot his first film—a short piece of news footage. That same year, Ole Olsen established the Nordisk Film studio and hired Graatkjaer as his cameraman. His first film was Viggo Larsen's the short The Anarchist's Mother-in Law (Anarkistens Svigermoder). In 1908 they made The Lion Hunt (Løvejagten, 1908). The short film created a scandal in Denmark because it showed the actual shooting of two lions that Olsen had purchased for the film. Graatkjær, who also acted the part of a hunter, was jailed for one day for participating in the film because it had been forbidden by the Ministry of State. The film was smuggled out of Denmark and became an international sensation.

In 1910, he formally changed his name from Sørensen to Graatkjær. During the seven years working at the Nordisk Film company, Graatkjaer filmed more than 100 movies. He became the favorite cinematographer for the director August Blom, with whom he made popular melodramas such as The White Slavery Trade (Den hvide slavehandel, 1910), At the Prison Gates (Ved Fængslets Port, 1911) and A Victim of the Mormons (Mormonens offer, 1911). In 1913, after a disagreement, Graatkjær left Nordisk Film to work for Asta Nielsen's German film company and her husband, director Urban Gad. They made 11 films together.

Graatkjær died on 11 November 1969.

== Selected filmography ==
- Anarkistens Svigermoder (1906)
- Den hvide slavinde (1907)
- Kameliadamen (1907)
- Løvejagten (1908)
- Den hvide slavehandel (1910)
- Balletdanserinden (1911)
- Ved Fængslets Port (1911)
- A Victim of the Mormons (1911)
- Engelein (1914)
- The Tunnel (1915)
- Bogdan Stimoff (1916)
- Kurfürstendamm (1920)
- The Yellow Death (1920)
- Hamlet (1921)
- Circus of Life (1921)
- Wandering Souls (1921)
- The Man of Steel (1922)
- The Merchant of Venice (1923)
- Earth Spirit (1923)
- I.N.R.I. (1923)
- The Love of a Queen (1923)
- The Men of Sybill (1923)
- The Voice of the Heart (1924)
- The Adventures of Sybil Brent (1925)
- Wallenstein (1925)
- Tragedy (1925)
- Shadows of the Metropolis (1925)
- Chamber Music (1925)
- Maytime (1926)
- The Flames Lie (1926)
- Roses from the South (1926)
- Heads Up, Charley (1927)
- The Imaginary Baron (1927)
- The Long Intermission (1927)
- The Most Beautiful Legs of Berlin (1927)
- The Master of Nuremberg (1927)
- The Lady with the Tiger Skin (1927)
- Radio Magic (1927)
- The Transformation of Dr. Bessel (1927)
- Violantha (1928)
- The Market of Life (1928)
- When the Guard Marches (1928)
- Fair Game (1928)
- The Fourth from the Right (1929)
- Misled Youth (1929)
- Come Back, All Is Forgiven (1929)
- Mischievous Miss (1930)
