= Lola Montez, the King's Dancer =

1922 film

- Directed by: Willi Wolff
- Written by: Paul Merzbach
- Starring: Ellen Richter; Arnold Korff; Fritz Kampers; Frida Richard
- Cinematography: Arpad Viragh
- Production company: Ellen Richter Film
- Distributed by: UFA
- Release date: 28 December 1922
- Country: Germany
- Languages: Silent; German intertitles

Lola Montez, the King's Dancer (German: Lola Montez, die Tänzerin des Königs) is a 1922 German silent historical drama film directed by Willi Wolff and starring Ellen Richter, Arnold Korff, and Fritz Kampers. It portrays the life of Lola Montez. The film was produced by Richter's own production company, but was released by the dominant German distributor UFA.

A previous biopic Lola Montez had been released in 1919, starring Leopoldine Konstantin.

== Cast ==
- Ellen Richter as Lola Montez
- Arnold Korff as Ludwig I, König von Bayern
- Fritz Kampers as Lieutenant Nussbaum
- Frida Richard as Zigeunerin
- Georg Alexander as Studiosus Ludwig von Hirschberg
- Georg Baselt as Von Pechmann, Polizeipräsident von München
- Arthur Bergen as Madras, Zigeuner
- Hugo Döblin as Gouverneur von Barcelona
- Heinrich George as Don Miguel
- Max Gülstorff as Journalist Beauvallion
- Leonhard Haskel as Pillet, Direktor der Pariser Oper
- Hans Junkermann as Hoftheaterintendant
- Friedrich Kühne as Staatsrat von Berks
- Robert Scholz as Louis Napoleon
- Julia Serda as Königin Therese
- Toni Tetzlaff as Primaballerina
- Hans Heinrich von Twardowski as Studiosus Friedemann
- Ernst Pittschau as Studiosus Peisner
- Fritz Beckmann
- Gustav Botz
- Rudolf Del Zopp
- Wilhelm Diegelmann
- Julius Falkenstein
- Maria Forescu
- Carl Geppert
- Martha Hoffmann
- Rudolf Meinhard-Jünger
- Albert Patry
- Herbert Paulmüller
- Hermann Picha
- Emil Rameau
- Fritz Richard
- Fritz Schulz
- Mizzi Schütz
- Alfred Walters
- Kurt Wolowsky

== Bibliography ==
- Kreimeier, Klaus (1999). The Ufa Story: A History of Germany's Greatest Film Company, 1918–1945. Berkeley: University of California Press. ISBN 978-0-520-22069-0.
