= The Daughter of Mehemed =

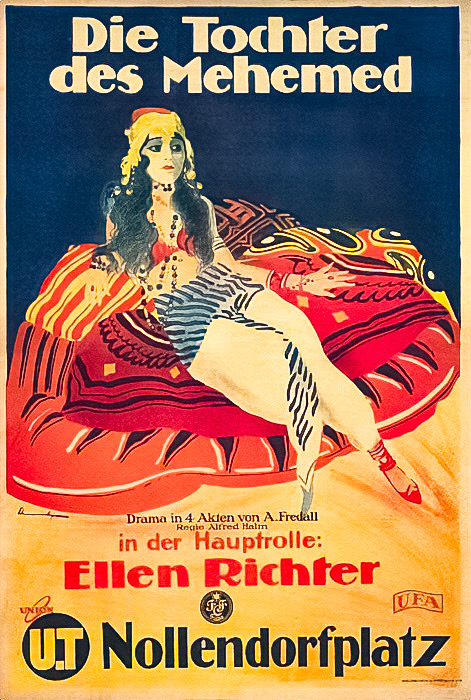
- Theatrical release poster
- Directed by: Alfred Halm
- Produced by: Paul Davidson
- Starring: Ellen Richter; Emil Jannings; Harry Liedtke
- Cinematography: Friedrich Weinmann
- Production company: Messter Film
- Distributed by: UFA
- Release date: 15 August 1919
- Running time: 66 minutes
- Country: Germany
- Languages: Silent; German intertitles

The Daughter of Mehemed (German: Die Tochter des Mehemed) was a 1919 German silent film directed by Alfred Halm and starring Ellen Richter, Emil Jannings and Harry Liedtke.

The film's art direction was by Kurt Richter.

== Cast ==
- Ellen Richter as Leila, Mehemeds Tochter
- Emil Jannings as Vaco Juan Riberda, Fabrikbesitzer
- Harry Liedtke as Dr. Jan van Zuylen, Geologe
- Fred Immler as Alinzo Diaz, Bankdirektor
- Max Kronert as Mehemed, alter Schuhmacher
- Lotte Davis as Frau Diaz
- Emilie Kurz as Biskra, sein Weib
- Albert Patry as Minister

== Bibliography ==
- Grange, William. Cultural Chronicle of the Weimar Republic. Scarecrow Press, 2008.
