= Heads Up, Charley =

1927 film

- Directed by: Willi Wolff
- Written by: Ludwig Wolff (novel); Robert Liebmann; Willi Wolff
- Produced by: Ellen Richter; Willi Wolff
- Starring: Ellen Richter; Anton Pointner; Michael Bohnen; Max Gülstorff; Marlene Dietrich
- Cinematography: Axel Graatkjaer; Georg Krause
- Production companies: Ellen Richter Film; UFA
- Distributed by: Parufamet
- Release date: 18 March 1927
- Country: Germany
- Languages: Silent; German intertitles

Heads Up, Charley (German: Kopf hoch, Charly!) is a 1927 German silent comedy film directed by Willi Wolff and starring Ellen Richter, Anton Pointner, and Michael Bohnen. Marlene Dietrich appears in a supporting role.

== Production ==
The film is based on a novel by Ludwig Wolff with location shooting done in Paris, Hamburg and New York. Other scenes were shot at Berlin's EFA Studios. The film premiered on 18 March 1927 at the UFA-Theatre Kurfürstendamm in Berlin and was a box office success.

Richter's heirs later agreed to withhold the film from exhibition during Dietrich's lifetime.

== Cast ==
- Ellen Richter as Charlotte Ditmar
- Anton Pointner as Frank Ditmar
- Michael Bohnen as John Jacob Bunjes
- Max Gülstorff as Harry Mosenheim
- Margaret Quimby as Margie Quinn
- George De Carlton as Rufus Quinn
- Angelo Ferrari as Marquis d'Ormesson
- Robert Scholz as Herzog von Sanzedilla
- Nikolai Malikoff as Prince Platonoff
- Toni Tetzlaff as Fr. Zangenberg
- Marlene Dietrich as Edmée Marchand
- Blandine Ebinger as Näherin
- Albert Paulig as Bunjes' Diener

== Bibliography ==
- Bach, Steven. Marlene Dietrich: Life and Legend. University of Minnesota Press, 2011.
- Ryan, David Stuart. The Blue Angel - The Life and Films of Marlene Dietrich. Kozmik Press, 2010.
