= Crime Reporter Holm =

1932 film

- Directed by: Erich Engels
- Written by: Arnold Lippschitz
- Produced by: Erich Engels
- Starring: Hermann Speelmans; Elga Brink; Julius Falkenstein
- Cinematography: Bruno Mondi
- Music by: Heinz Letton
- Production companies: Engels & Schmidt Tonfilm
- Distributed by: Engels & Schmidt Tonfilm
- Release date: 15 April 1932
- Running time: 80 minutes
- Country: Germany
- Language: German

Crime Reporter Holm (German: Kriminalreporter Holm) is a 1932 German mystery film directed by Erich Engels and starring Hermann Speelmans, Elga Brink and Julius Falkenstein. It was shot at the Johannisthal Studios in Berlin. The film's sets were designed by the art directors Willi Herrmann and Herbert Lippschitz. Location shooting took place around Garmisch-Partenkirchen in Bavaria.

== Synopsis ==
At a hotel in a resort town in the Bavarian Alps, a retired district attorney from Chicago is shot dead. Crime reporter Peter Holm is on the spot and joins in the murder investigation.

== Cast ==
- Hermann Speelmans as Peter Holm
- Julius Falkenstein as Professor Caesar Cicero Nebelthau
- Elga Brink as Carla Garden, Tänzerin
- Anny Schwarz as Marie
- Harry Hardt
- Erik Wirl
- Alfred Beierle
- Hugo Flink
- Gerhard Bienert
- Gerhard Dammann
- Karl Klöckner
- Ossy Kratz-Corell

== Bibliography ==
- James Robert Parish & Kingsley Canham. Film Directors Guide: Western Europe. Scarecrow Press, 1976.
