= Julius Falkenstein =

German actor (1879–1933)

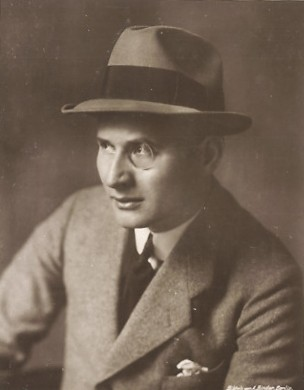
- Julius Falkenstein ca. 1922
- Born: 25 February 1879; Berlin, German Empire
- Died: 9 December 1933 (aged 54); Berlin, Nazi Germany
- Resting place: Weißensee cemetery, Berlin
- Occupation: Actor
- Years active: 1904–1933

Julius Falkenstein (25 February 1879 – 9 December 1933) was a German stage and film actor of the silent era. He appeared in more than 180 films between 1914 and 1933. Falkenstein was Jewish, but secured a special permit to continue making films following the Nazi rise to power in 1933. He died of natural causes the same year, having made only one further film.

== Selected filmography ==
- Die geheimnisvolle Villa (1914)
- Als ich tot war (1916)
- The Princess of Neutralia (1917)
- The Toboggan Cavalier (1918)
- The Oyster Princess (1919)
- The Dancer Barberina (1920)
- The Love of a Thief (1920)
- The Princess of the Nile (1920)
- Romeo and Juliet in the Snow (1920)
- The Haunted Castle (1921)
- The Story of Christine von Herre (1921)
- The Convict of Cayenne (1921)
- Lola Montez, the King's Dancer (1922)
- Dr. Mabuse the Gambler (1922)
- His Excellency from Madagascar (1922)
- Don Juan (1922)
- Das Milliardensouper (1923)
- Earth Spirit (1923)
- The Doll Maker of Kiang-Ning (1923)
- The Weather Station (1923)
- The Grand Duke's Finances (1924)
- In the Name of the King (1924)
- Neptune Bewitched (1925)
- Women of Luxury (1925)
- A Waltz Dream (1925)
- The Brothers Schellenberg (1926)
- Department Store Princess (1926)
- Countess Ironing-Maid (1926)
- The Blue Danube (1926)
- Young Blood (1926)
- Circus Romanelli (1926)
- Annemarie and Her Cavalryman (1926)
- Vienna, How it Cries and Laughs (1926)
- The Pride of the Company (1926)
- The Armoured Vault (1926)
- We'll Meet Again in the Heimat (1926)
- Sword and Shield (1926)
- We Belong to the Imperial-Royal Infantry Regiment (1926)
- The Master of Nuremberg (1927)
- Break-in (1927)
- Linden Lady on the Rhine (1927)
- Excluded from the Public (1927)
- Night of Mystery (1927)
- That Was Heidelberg on Summer Nights (1927)
- The Convicted (1927)
- His Late Excellency (1927)
- Hello Caesar! (1927)
- The Indiscreet Woman (1927)
- Light-Hearted Isabel (1927)
- Dancing Vienna (1927)
- The Page Boy at the Golden Lion (1928)
- Spies (1928)
- The Blue Mouse (1928)
- Secrets of the Orient (1928)
- You Walk So Softly (1928)
- Her Dark Secret (1929)
- The Night Belongs to Us (1929)
- Somnambul (1929)
- The Lord of the Tax Office (1929)
- Taxi at Midnight (1929)
- Beware of Loose Women (1929)
- Distinguishing Features (1929)
- The Customs Judge (1929)
- Lux, King of Criminals (1929)
- Sinful and Sweet (1929)
- Daughter of the Regiment (1929)
- The Model from Montparnasse (1929)
- What a Woman Dreams of in Springtime (1929)
- Tragedy of Youth (1929)
- Only on the Rhine (1930)
- The Man in the Dark (1930)
- It Happens Every Day (1930)
- The Woman Without Nerves (1930)
- Marriage Strike (1930)
- Fire in the Opera House (1930)
- Mischievous Miss (1930)
- The Immortal Vagabond (1930)
- Fairground People (1930)
- Love in the Ring (1930)
- The Other (1930)
- End of the Rainbow (1930)
- By a Nose (1931)
- Road to Rio (1931)
- Der Kongreß tanzt (1931)
- Shooting Festival in Schilda (1931)
- The True Jacob (1931)
- The Adventurer of Tunis (1931)
- A Crafty Youth (1931)
- Berlin-Alexanderplatz (1931)
- Grock (1931)
- That's All That Matters (1931)
- Weekend in Paradise (1931)
- The Firm Gets Married (1931)
- No More Love (1931)
- A Waltz by Strauss (1931)
- Queen of the Night (1931)
- Inquest (1931)
- Victoria and Her Hussar (1931)
- Night Convoy (1932)
- Crime Reporter Holm (1932)
- Holzapfel Knows Everything (1932)
- Two Heavenly Blue Eyes (1932)
- Overnight Sensation (1932)
- Impossible Love (1932)
- The Magic Top Hat (1932)
- The Importance of Being Earnest (1932)
- The Song of Night (1932)
- Chauffeur Antoinette (1932)
- Distorting at the Resort (1932)
- I by Day, You by Night (1932)
- Storms of Passion (1932)
- The Testament of Cornelius Gulden (1932)
- Gypsies of the Night (1932)
- You Don't Forget Such a Girl (1932)
- Man Without a Name (1932)
- The Victor (1932)
- The Beautiful Adventure (1932)
- Marion, That's Not Nice (1933)
- A Woman Like You (1933)
- The Only Girl (1933)
- Laughing Heirs (1933)
- Spies at Work (1933)
- The Sandwich Girl (1933)
- The Empress and I (1933)
- The Roberts Case (1933)
- A Song for You (1933)
- The Flower Girl from the Grand Hotel (1934)
