= Ernst Stern =

German scenic designer (1876–1954)

Ernst Stern (1 April 1876 – 28 August 1954) was a Romanian-German scenic designer who, through his collaborations with most of the prominent German directors of the early 20th century, helped define the aesthetic of expressionism in both the theatre and the cinema.

== Early life ==
Born in Bucharest, Romania, to Jewish parents of Russian, German and Hungarian origin, Stern studied under Nikolaos Gyzis and Franz Stuck at the Academy of Fine Arts, Munich beginning in 1894.

== Career ==
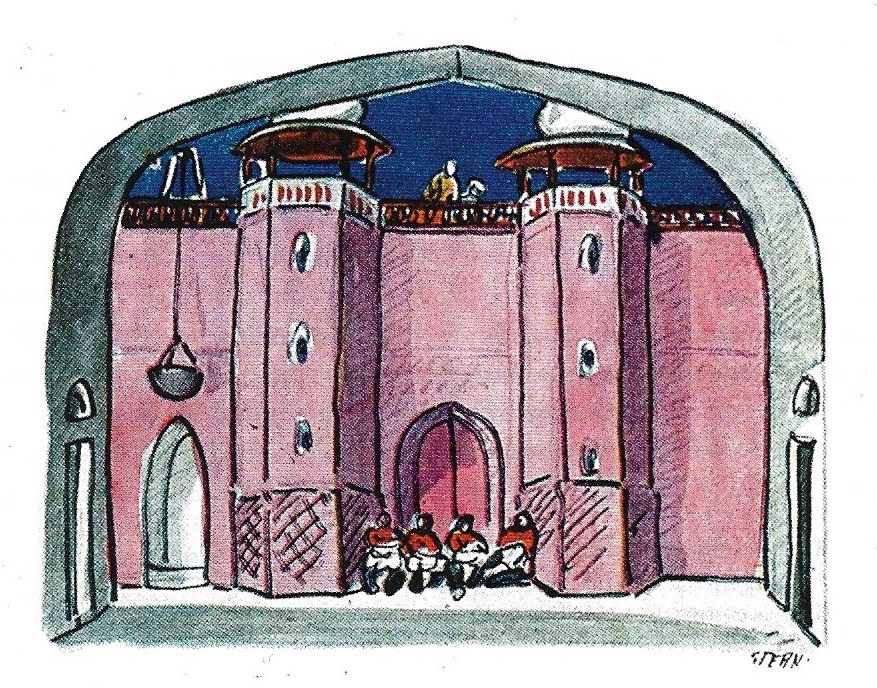
Drawing by Ernst Stern for the scene "Before the harem" in Sumurûn from Friedrich Freksa to Kammerspiele in 1910

Stern moved to Berlin in 1905, where Max Reinhardt hired him the next year as a set designer for the Deutsches Theater. He remained Max Reinhardt's main design collaborator until the director's departure in 1921 and designed roughly ninety shows during that time, with notable works including adaptations of William Shakespeare's Twelfth Night (1907), Hamlet (1909), and A Midsummer Night's Dream (1913), Karl Vollmöller's The Miracle (1911), Reinhard Sorge's The Beggar (1917), and Henrik Ibsen's John Gabriel Borkman (1917).

Under Reinhardt, the Deutsches Theater became a center of German Expressionist Theater, so Stern designed many sets in that style. As Stern's design aesthetics tended towards serenity and realism, however, this pairing was not always successful. Perhaps his most noteworthy expressionist work was Paul Leni's 1924 silent film Waxworks (1924), for which he designed the costumes. Stern collaborated at some point with nearly all the important German film directors of the period, including F.W. Murnau, Ernst Lubitsch, Richard Oswald, Carl Froelich, and William Dieterle.

In 1924, Stern moved on to the Großes Schauspielhaus, where he designed for a number of musical revues and the popular musical The White Horse Inn (1930). In the late 1920s, Stern also began spending considerable time in London, where he designed the sets for Noël Coward's Bitter Sweet (1929) and Richard Rodgers and Lorenz Hart's Ever Green (1930). His submitted designs to Rupert D'Oyly Carte for new settings for "The Gondoliers" and "The Yeomen of the Guard" (c.1920s, dates unknown), which contain many traditional qualities at variance with his reputation for expressionism, but they were never put into production (the paintings still survive).

When the Nazi Party seized power in Germany in 1933, Stern was in Paris attending a performance of The White Horse Inn. He remained in the city for a time and then settled permanently in London in 1934. For the rest of his life he primarily collaborated with British writers at the Savoy Theatre, Aldwych Theatre, and Adelphi Theatre. He also designed the displays for Selfridges for the coronation of King George VI and collaborated with Donald Wolfit on several Shakespeare productions during World War II.

== Later life ==
Stern was awarded a pension by George VI and died in London.

== Gallery ==
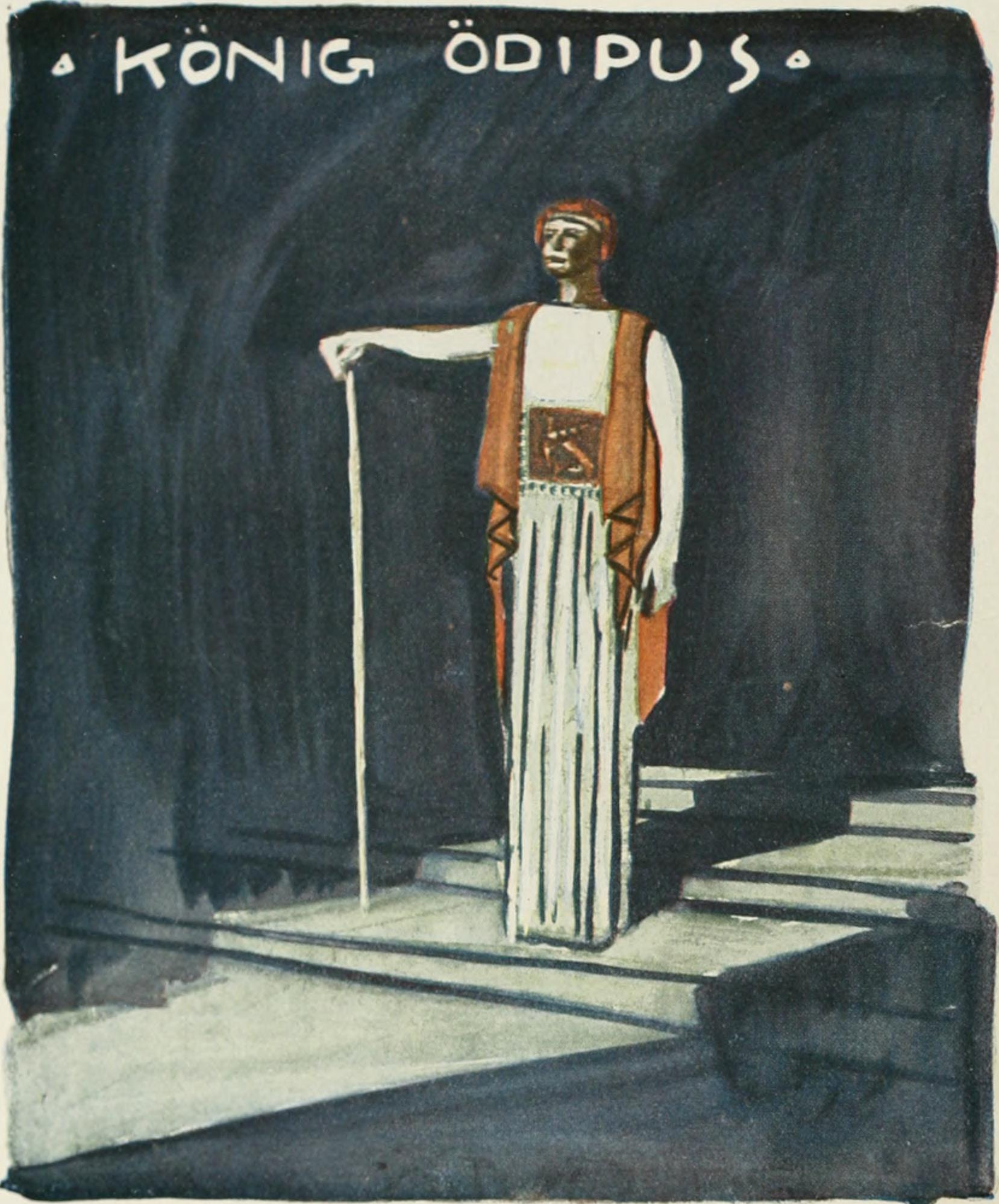
Oedipus Rex
(Sophocles)

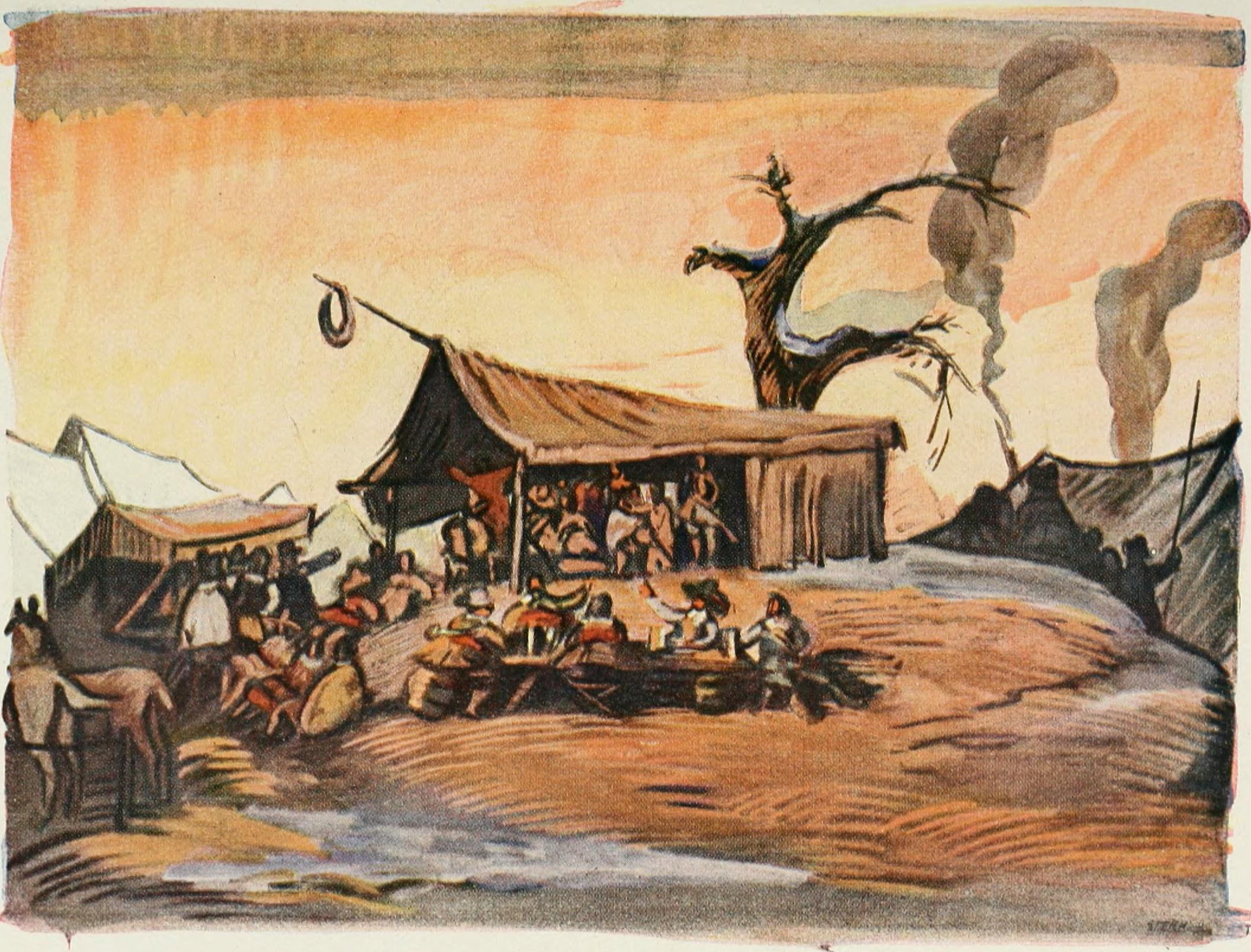
Wallenstein's Camp
(Schiller)

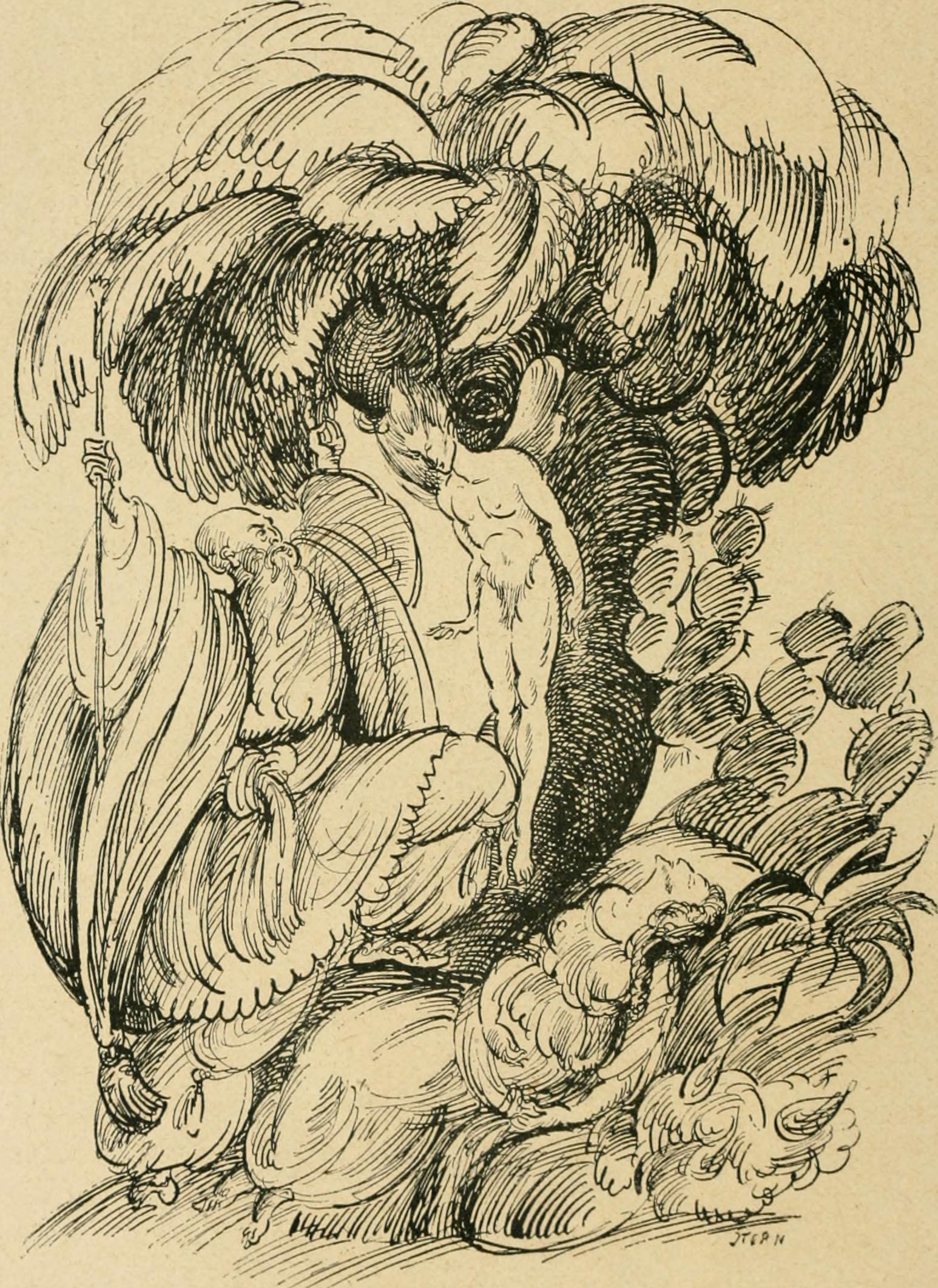
Appearance of Ariel
(The Tempest)

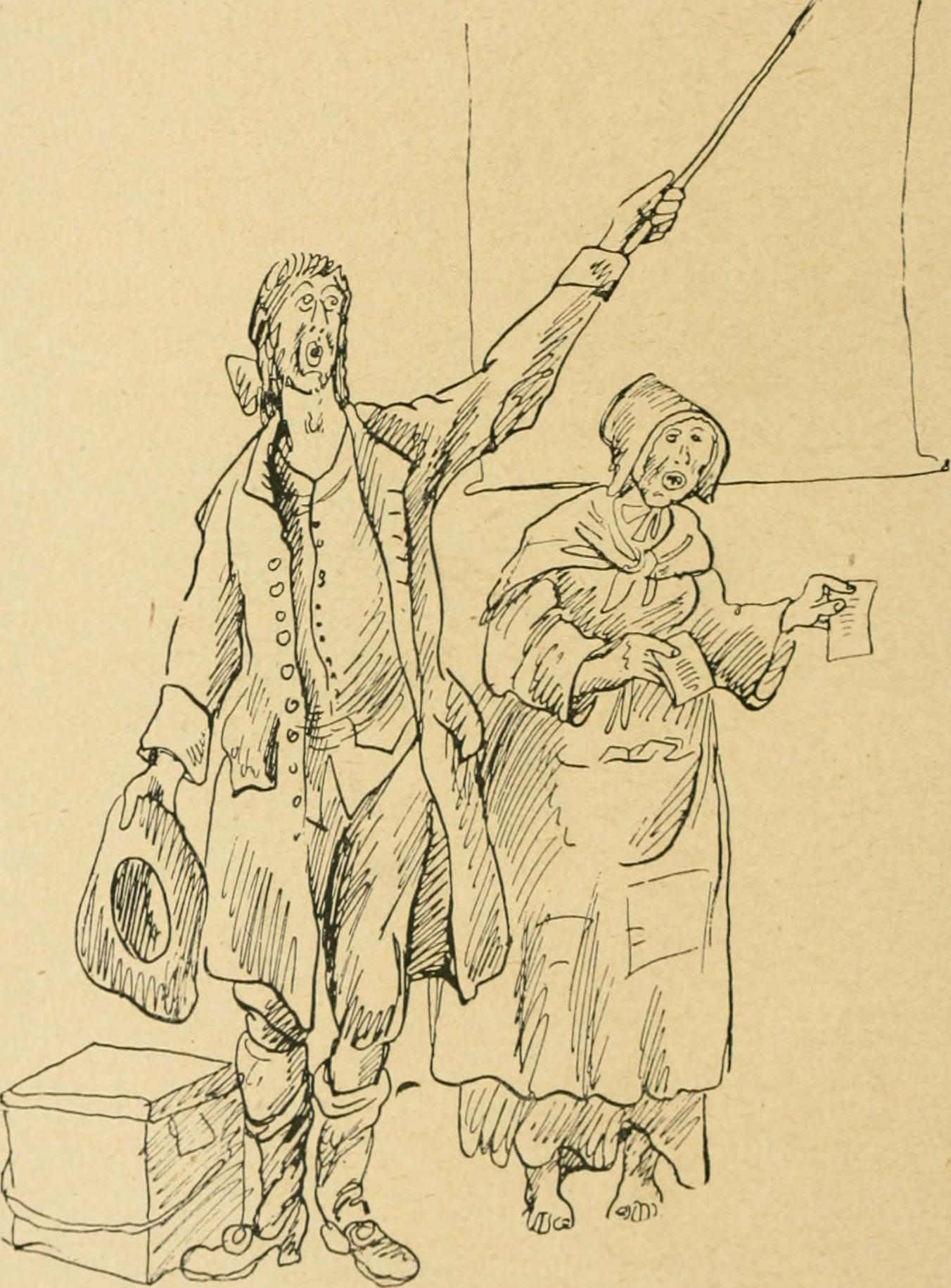
Murder ballad singers from Goethe's de:Das Jahrmarktsfest zu Plundersweilern

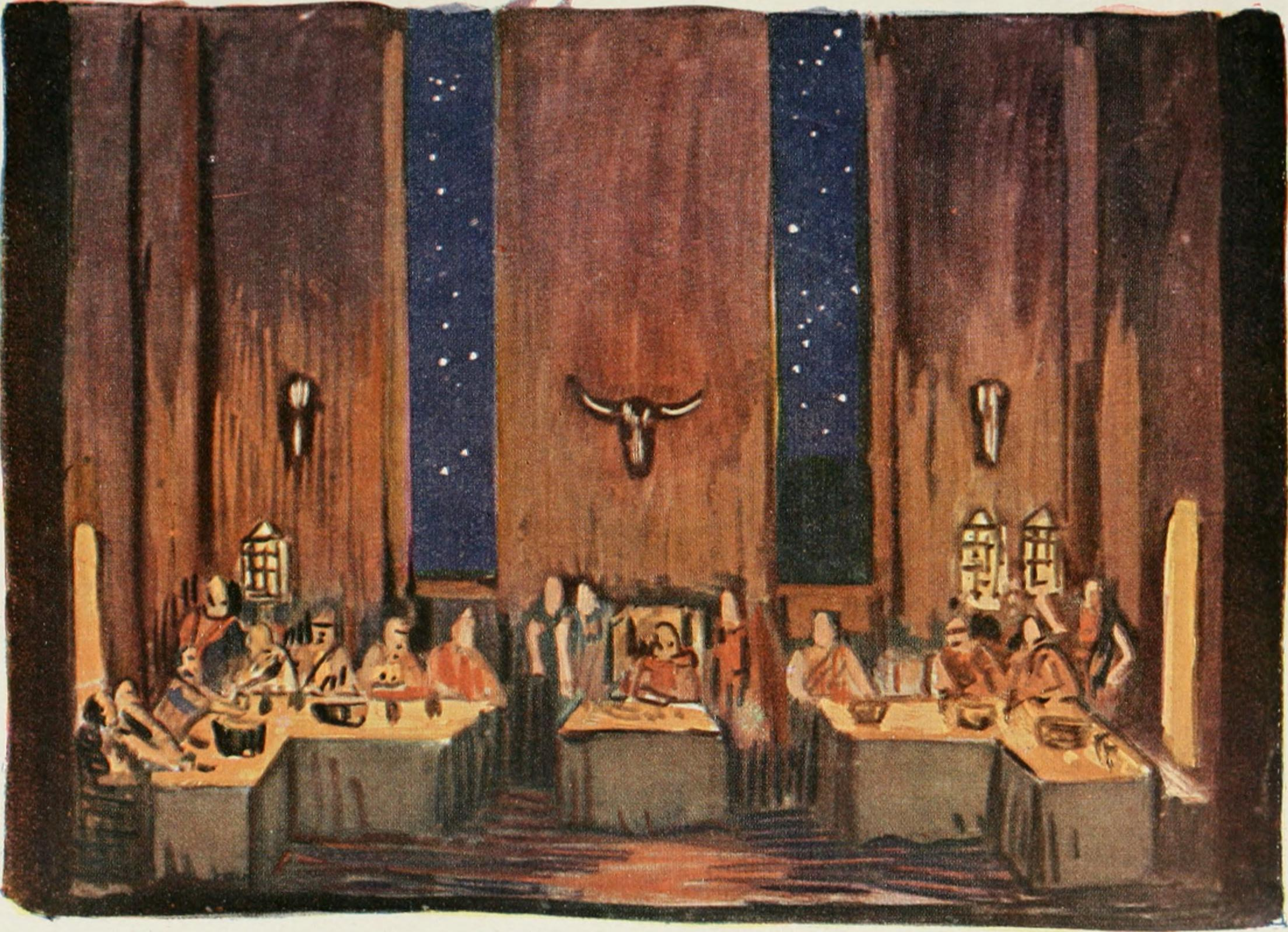
The Banquet
(Macbeth )

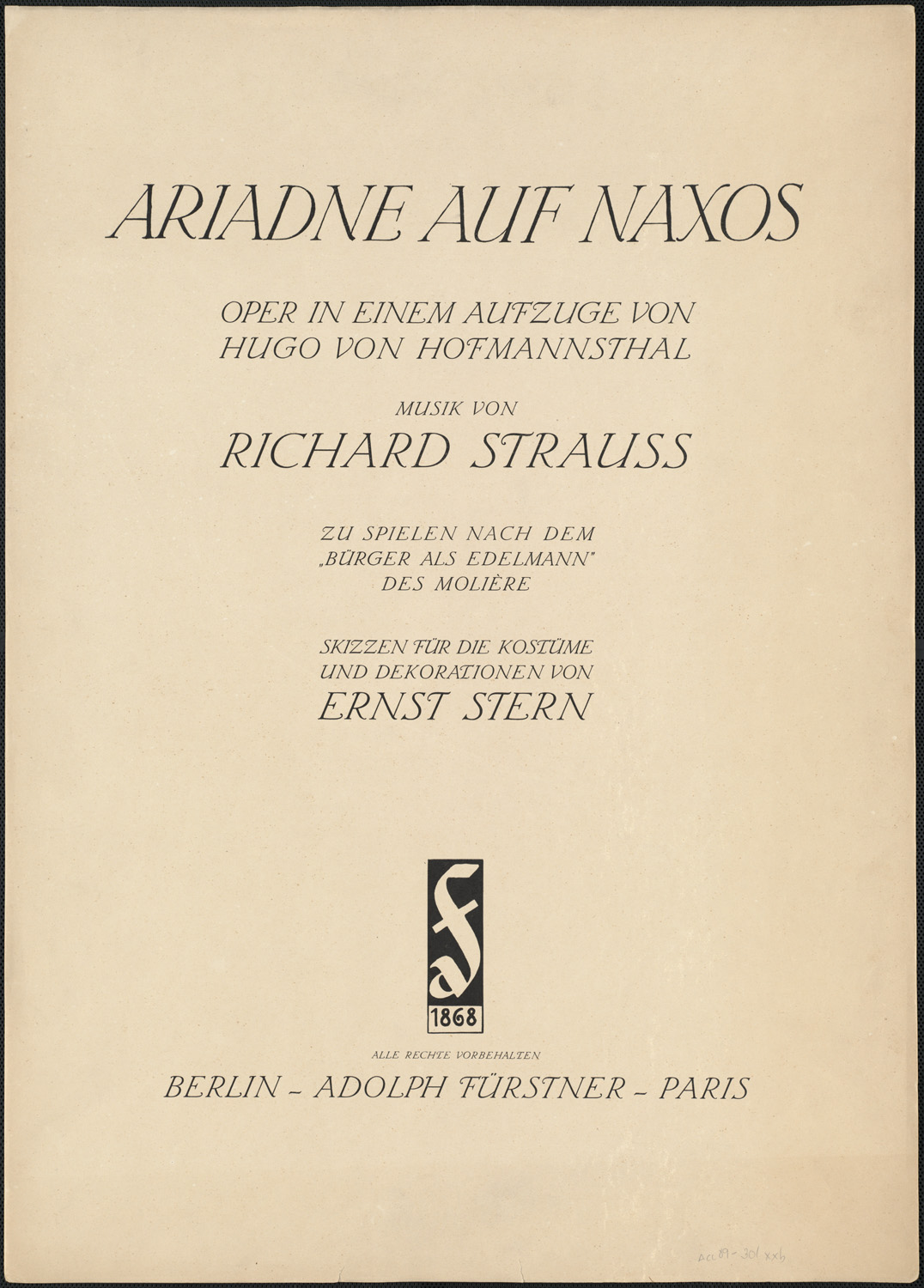
Title page of Richard Strauss's Ariadne auf Naxos

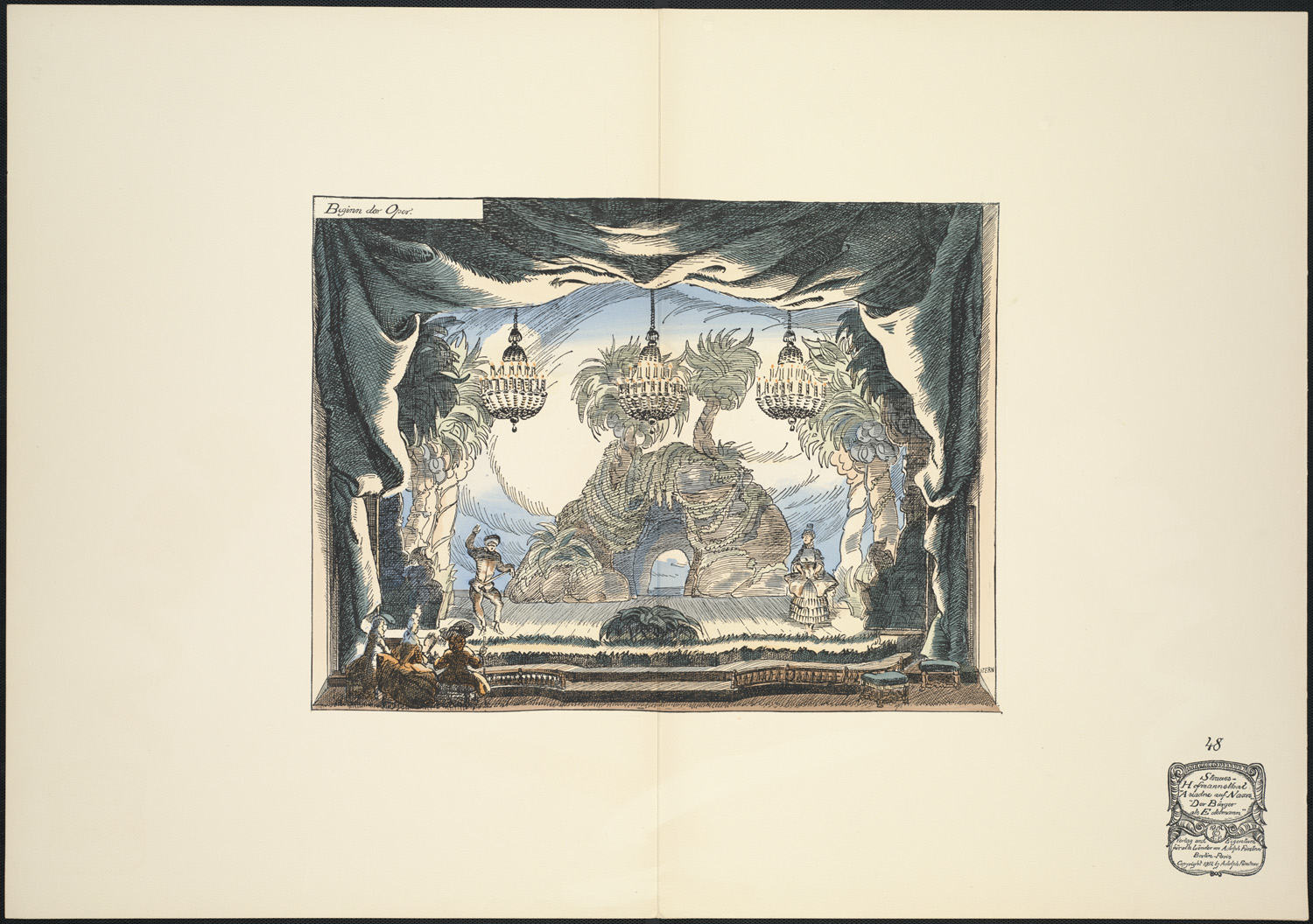
Opening scene
(Ariadne auf Naxos)

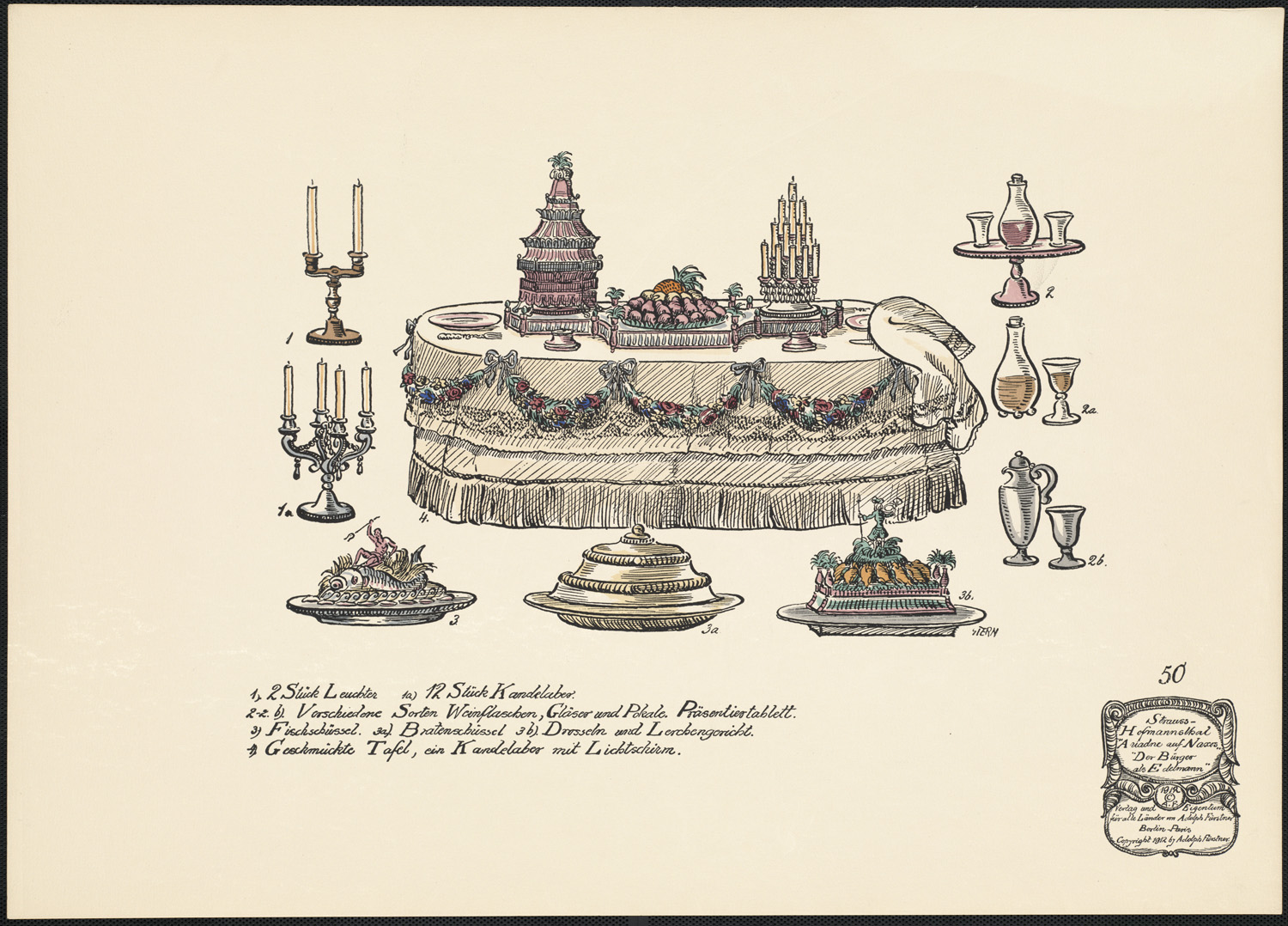
Feast table and lighting
(Ariadne auf Naxos)

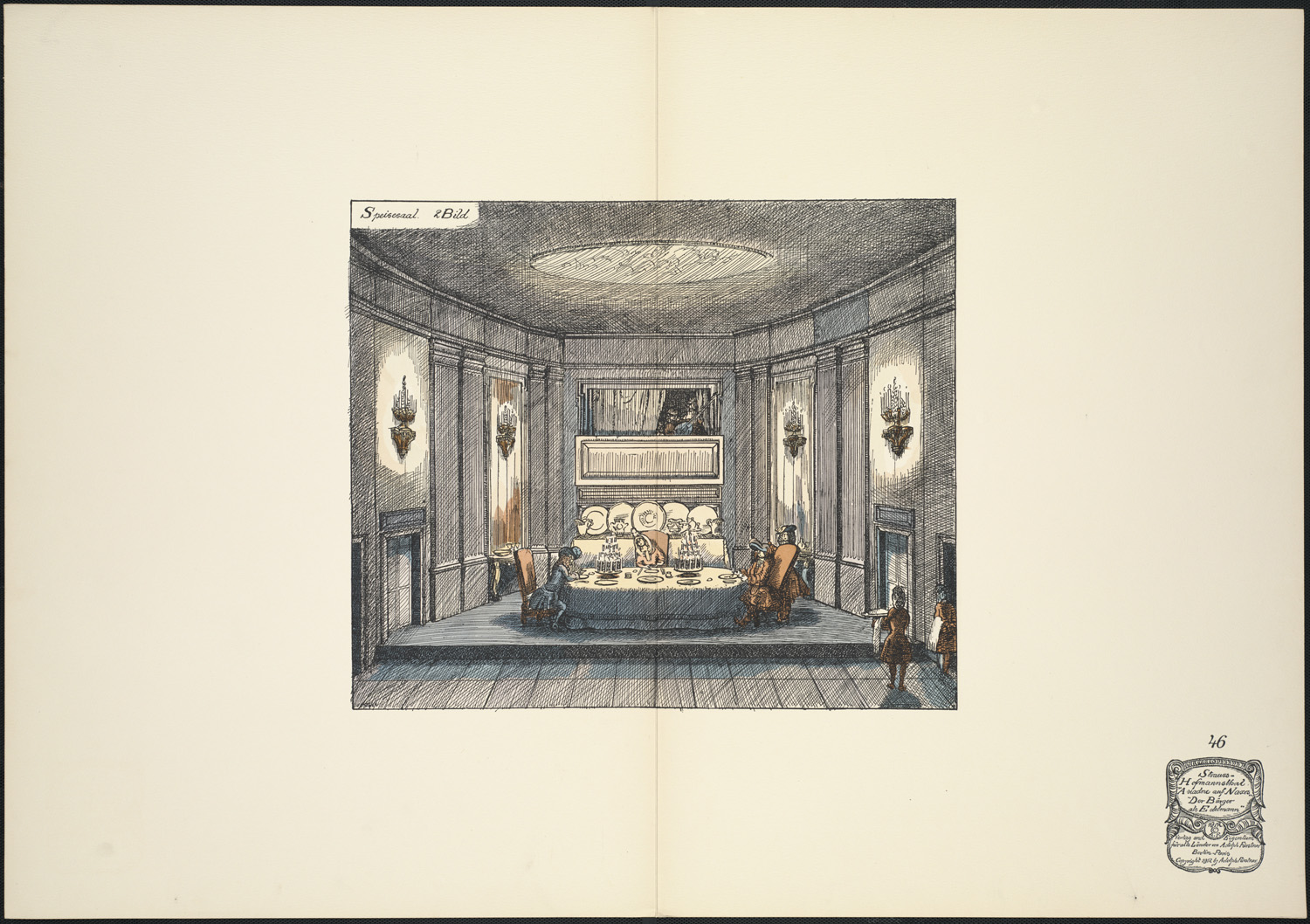
Dining Room
(Ariadne auf Naxos)

== Selected filmography ==
- Colomba (1918)
- Europe, General Delivery (1918)
- The Dancer Barberina (1920)
- Countess Walewska (1920)
- The World Wants To Be Deceived (1926)
- Sword and Shield (1926)
- The Imaginary Baron (1927)
- A Serious Case (1927)
- Behind the Altar (1927)
- Tragedy of a Marriage (1927)
- The Lady with the Tiger Skin (1927)
- Rustle of Spring (1929)
