= Carl Geppert =

German actor

Carl Geppert was a German actor. He was born on the 22nd of May 1883 in Austria-Hungary and died in Czechoslovakia on the 23rd of October 1937. He appeared in more than fifty films from 1919 to 1932.

== Selected filmography ==
Year	Title	Role	Notes
1931	Once I Loved a Girl in Vienna		
1930	Pension Schöller		
1929	The Gypsy Chief		
1929	We Stick Together Through Thick and Thin		
1929	Revenge for Eddy		
1928	You Walk So Softly		
1928	The Insurmountable		
1928	Robert and Bertram		
1928	Herkules Maier		
1928	Love and Thieves		
1927	The Beggar from Cologne Cathedral		
1927	Weekend Magic		
1927	The Standard-Bearer of Sedan		
1927	The False Prince		
1927	The Pink Slippers		
1926	The Bohemian Dancer		
1926	The Flight in the Night		
1926	We'll Meet Again in the Heimat		
1925	Countess Maritza		
1925	Curfew		
1925	Women You Rarely Greet		
1924	By Order of Pompadour		
1923	The Woman Worth Millions		
1923	Friend Ripp		
1922	Tingeltangel		
1922	Lola Montez, the King's Dancer		
1922	The Count of Charolais		
1921	The Secret of Satana Magarita		
1921	Lady Hamilton		
1920	Whitechapel		
