= Max Kronert =

German actor

- Born: Max Josef Florian Trübsand c. 1873; Breslau, German Empire (now, Wrocław, Poland)
- Died: 22 July 1925; Berlin-Wilmersdorf, Germany
- Other names: Max Trübsand-Kronert
- Occupation: Actor
- Years active: 1894–1925

Max Kronert (born Max Josef Florian Trübsand; c. 1873 – 22 July 1925) was a German stage and film actor.

== Selected filmography ==
- Carmen (1918)
- The Monastery of Sendomir (1919)
- The Toy of the Tsarina (1919)
- The Oyster Princess (1919)
- Countess Doddy (1919)
- My Wife, the Movie Star (1919)
- Die Tochter des Mehemed (1919)
- The Doll (1919)
- The Lady in Black (1920)
- The Golem: How He Came into the World (1920)
- Sumurun (1920)
- Panic in the House of Ardon (1920)
- Satan (1920)
- The Riddle of the Sphinx (1921)
- The Wildcat (1921)
- The Adventuress of Monte Carlo (1921)
- The Eternal Curse (1921)
- The Rats (1921)
- Playing with Fire (1921)
- Das Rätsel der Sphinx (1921)
- The White Desert (1922)
- Louise de Lavallière (1922)
- Alles für Geld (1923)
- I.N.R.I. (1923)
- A Woman for 24 Hours (1925)

== Bibliography ==
- Eisner, Lotte H. The Haunted Screen: Expressionism in the German Cinema and the Influence of Max Reinhardt. University of California Press, 2008.
- Hardt, Ursula. From Caligari to California: Erich Pommer's Life in the International Film Wars. Berghahn Books, 1996.
