= Henry Bender =

German actor (1867–1933)

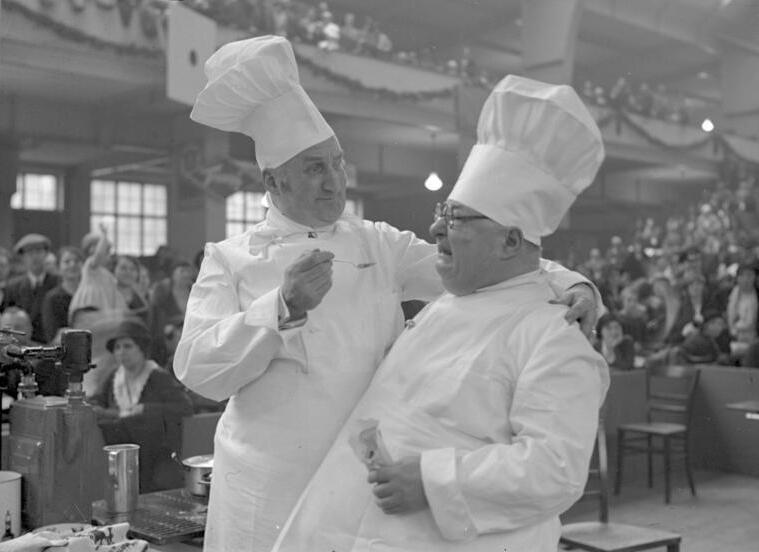
- Born: 1 October 1867; Berlin, Kingdom of Prussia
- Died: 14 May 1933 (aged 65)
- Occupation: Actor
- Years active: 1908–1933 (film)

Henry Bender (born Harry Bandheimer; 1867–1933) was a German stage and film actor. He appeared in more than a hundred films during his career.

== Selected filmography ==
- The Devil (1918)
- Madeleine (1919)
- Whitechapel (1920)
- The Lord of the Beasts (1921)
- Murder Without Cause (1921)
- The Hunt for the Truth (1921)
- The Adventuress of Monte Carlo (1921)
- Peter Voss, Thief of Millions (1921)
- The Riddle of the Sphinx (1921)
- The Two Pigeons (1922)
- Marie Antoinette, the Love of a King (1922)
- Miss Rockefeller Is Filming (1922)
- Sunken Worlds (1922)
- His Excellency from Madagascar (1922)
- The Girl with the Mask (1922)
- Horrido (1924)
- Gobseck (1924)
- The Most Beautiful Woman in the World (1924)
- Express Train of Love (1925)
- Flight Around the World (1925)
- Cock of the Roost (1925)
- Give My Regards to the Blonde Child on the Rhine (1926)
- The Blue Danube (1926)
- Why Get a Divorce? (1926)
- Trude (1926)
- Annemarie and Her Cavalryman (1926)
- Women of Passion (1926)
- The Great Duchess (1926)
- The Pride of the Company (1926)
- The Captain from Koepenick (1926)
- The Circus of Life (1926)
- Wrath of the Seas (1926)
- Vienna - Berlin (1926)
- Darling, Count the Cash (1926)
- When I Came Back (1926)
- The White Horse Inn (1926)
- A Crazy Night (1927)
- The Most Beautiful Legs of Berlin (1927)
- Potsdam (1927)
- The Imaginary Baron (1927)
- The Island of Forbidden Kisses (1927)
- Assassination (1927)
- A Serious Case (1927)
- The Girl from Frisco (1927)
- The Woman from Till 12 (1928)
- Today I Was With Frieda (1928)
- You Walk So Softly (1928)
- Immorality (1928)
- Panic (1928)
- Dear Homeland (1929)
- Dawn (1929)
- Yes, Yes, Women Are My Weakness (1929)
- From a Bachelor's Diary (1929)
- Taxi at Midnight (1929)
- The Singing City (1930)
- A Gentleman for Hire (1930)
- The Widow's Ball (1930)
- The Woman Without Nerves (1930)
- Alraune (1930)
- Three Days Confined to Barracks (1930)
- The White Devil (1930)
- Rooms to Let (1930)
- Josef the Chaste (1930)
- The Spanish Fly (1931)
- A Crafty Youth (1931)
- The Office Manager (1931)
- The Emperor's Sweetheart (1931)
- Errant Husbands (1931)
- Such a Greyhound (1931)
- The Adventurer of Tunis (1931)
- Holzapfel Knows Everything (1932)
- At Your Orders, Sergeant (1932)
- A Night in Paradise (1932)
- Marion, That's Not Nice (1933)

== Bibliography ==
- Chandler, Charlotte. Marlene: Marlene Dietrich, A Personal Biography. Simon and Schuster, 2011.
