= Hugo Flink =

Austrian actor

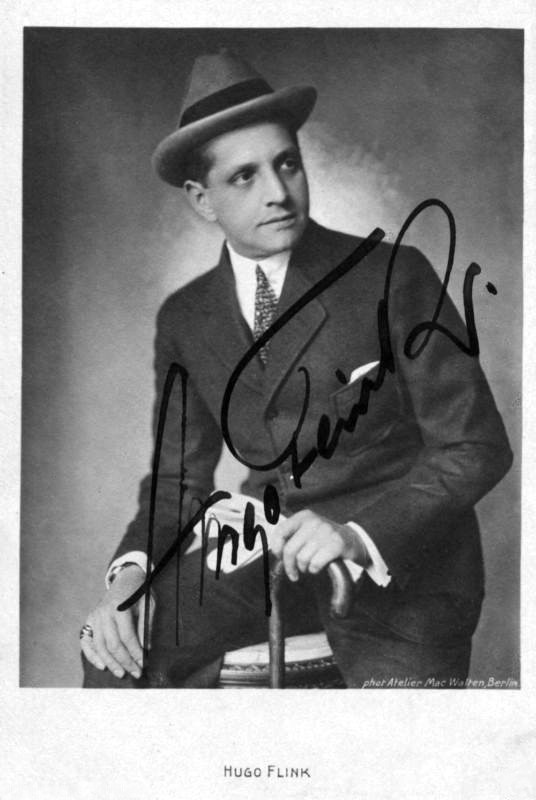
- Flink c. 1916
- Born: August 16, 1879; Vienna, Austro-Hungarian Empire
- Died: May 2, 1947 (aged 67); Berlin, Germany
- Occupation: Actor
- Years active: 1900–1942

Hugo Flink (16 August 1879 – 2 May 1947) was an Austrian stage and film actor. Flink was one of the earliest actors to play Sherlock Holmes on screen.

Flink was born in Vienna and died in Berlin.

== Selected filmography ==
- The Onyx Head (1917)
- Let There Be Light (1917)
- The Salamander Ruby (1918)
- Out of the Depths (1919)
- Catherine the Great (1920)
- The Love of a Thief (1920)
- Princess Woronzoff (1920)
- Va banque (1920)
- The Dance of Love and Happiness (1921)
- The Black Spider (1921)
- The Love Nest (1922)
- The Sensational Trial (1923)
- The Stolen Professor (1924)
- Love and Trumpets (1925)
- Children of No Importance (1926)
- People to Each Other (1926)
- Mademoiselle Josette, My Woman (1926)
- Bismarck 1862–1898 (1927)
- Two Under the Stars (1927)
- Lord of the Night (1927)
- The Gypsy Chief (1929)
- Crime Reporter Holm (1932)
- 1914 (1931)
- The Secret of Johann Orth (1932)
- Things Are Getting Better Already (1932)
- The Eleven Schill Officers (1932)
- Waltz War (1933)
- Little Man, What Now? (1933)
- A Woman With Power of Attorney (1934)
- Roses from the South (1934)
- Last Stop (1935)
- Don't Lose Heart, Suzanne! (1935)
- If It Were Not for Music (1935)
- My Life for Maria Isabella (1935)
- Family Parade (1936)
- The Impossible Woman (1936)
- Fridericus (1937)
- Crooks in Tails (1937)
- The Scoundrel (1939)
- Falstaff in Vienna (1940)
- The Way to Freedom (1941)
- Die goldene Stadt (1942)
- Romance in a Minor Key (1943)
- Back Then (1943)
- The Bath in the Barn (1943)

== Bibliography ==
- Hardt, Ursula (1996). From Caligari to California: Erich Pommer's Life in the International Film Wars. Providence: Berghahn Books. ISBN 978-1-57181-930-7.
- Leitch, Thomas M. (2007). Film Adaptation and Its Discontents: From Gone With the Wind to the Passion of the Christ. Baltimore: Johns Hopkins University Press. ISBN 978-0-8018-8565-5.
