= Robert Garrison (actor) =

German actor

Robert Garrison (born Ruben Gerson; 18 July 1872 – died 5 January 1930) was a German-Jewish film actor.

Robert Garrison was born in Strasburg in Westpreußen and died in Berlin.

== Selected filmography ==
- People in Ecstasy (1921)
- The Ancient Law (1923)
- Quarantäne (1923)
- Debit and Credit (1924)
- Michael (1924)
- Dudu, a Human Destiny (1924)
- Father Voss (1925)
- If You Have an Aunt (1925)
- Slums of Berlin (1925)
- Shadows of the Metropolis (1925)
- Joyless Street (1925)
- The Company Worth Millions (1925)
- The Circus Princess (1925)
- The Humble Man and the Chanteuse (1925)
- Peter the Pirate (1925)
- An Artist of Life (1925)
- The Man Who Sold Himself (1925)
- The Woman with That Certain Something (1925)
- Nick, King of the Chauffeurs (1925)
- Women of Luxury (1925)
- Countess Maritza (1925)
- Tragedy (1925)
- Love's Joys and Woes (1926)
- The Fallen (1926)
- The Young Man from the Ragtrade (1926)
- The Third Squadron (1926)
- The Three Mannequins (1926)
- Countess Ironing-Maid (1926)
- I Liked Kissing Women (1926)
- Watch on the Rhine (1926)
- How Do I Marry the Boss? (1927)
- The Girl from Abroad (1927)
- Klettermaxe (1927)
- Circle of Lovers (1927)
- The Constant Nymph (1928)
- Knights of the Night (1928)
- Master and Mistress (1928)
- Volga Volga (1928)
- Der Herzensphotograph (1928)
- The Insurmountable (1928)
- Tales from the Vienna Woods (1928)
- The Lady from Argentina (1928)
- Today I Was With Frieda (1928)
- Lady in the Spa (1929)
- The Ship of Lost Souls (1929)
- The Gypsy Chief (1929)
- The Daredevil Reporter (1929)
- I Lost My Heart on a Bus (1929)
- Foolish Happiness (1929)
- Yes, Yes, Women Are My Weakness (1929)
- Perjury (1929)
- The Hound of the Baskervilles (1929)
- Grischa the Cook (1929)
- Rivals for the World Record (1930)
- The Woman Without Nerves (1930)
- Busy Girls (1930)
- Police Spy 77 (1930)

== Bibliography ==
- Eisner, Lotte H. The Haunted Screen: Expressionism in the German Cinema and the Influence of Max Reinhardt. University of California Press, 2008.
