= Adolf Klein =

Austrian actor

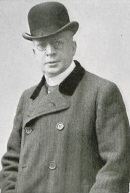
- Born: 15 August 1847; Vienna, Austrian Empire
- Died: 11 March 1931 (aged 83); Berlin, Weimar Germany
- Occupations: Film actor; Stage actor
- Years active: 1916–1931 (film)

Adolf Klein (15 August 1847 – 11 March 1931) was an Austrian actor and theatre director. Klein appeared in around sixty films, mainly during the silent era. He appeared in a number of the epics made by the German film industry during the early 1920s such as his role as Cardinal Wolsey in Ernst Lubitsch's Anna Boleyn (1920).

== Selected filmography ==
- Dr. Hart's Diary (1917)
- The Mirror of the World (1918)
- The Seeds of Life (1918)
- Veritas Vincit (1919)
- The Panther Bride (1919)
- The Loves of Käthe Keller (1919)
- Anna Boleyn (1920)
- Uriel Acosta (1920)
- The Secret of the Mummy (1921)
- Lady Hamilton (1921)
- Ilona (1921)
- The Adventuress of Monte Carlo (1921)
- The Amazon (1921)
- The Inheritance of Tordis (1921)
- The Maharaja's Favourite Wife (1921)
- The Passion of Inge Krafft (1921)
- The Women of Gnadenstein (1921)
- The Three Aunts (1921)
- Phantom (1922)
- Fridericus Rex (1922)
- The Black Cover (1922)
- Frauenmoral (1923)
- The Last Battle (1923)
- Rivals (1923)
- Judith (1923)
- The Hungarian Princess (1923)
- Carlos and Elisabeth (1924)
- Strong Winds (1924)
- A Free People (1925)
- Bismarck (1925)
- Wood Love (1925)
- Shadows of the Metropolis (1925)
- Shadow of the World City (1925)
- The City of Temptation (1925)
- Maytime (1926)
- The Great Duchess (1926)
- Bismarck 1862–1898 (1927)
- 1914 (1931)

== Bibliography ==
- Fletcher, Stella (2009). Cardinal Wolsey: A Life in Renaissance Europe. London: Continuum. ISBN 978-1-84725-245-6.
