= Robert Liebmann =

German screenwriter (1890–1942)

- Born: 5 June 1890; Berlin, German Empire
- Died: July 1942 (aged 52); Auschwitz concentration camp, German-occupied Poland
- Occupation: Screenwriter
- Years active: 1919–1938 (film)

Robert Liebmann (5 June 1890 – July 1942) was a German screenwriter.

In 1929, Liebmann was Germany's most commercially successful screenwriter, and was hired to join the writing team for The Blue Angel; a musical comedy that brought Marlene Dietrich international acclaim.

Being of Jewish ancestry, he was one of the many that were murdered by the Nazis in 1942. During the occupation of France by the Nazis, Liebmann was arrested and sent to the Drancy internment camp. From there, the Nazis deported him to the Auschwitz concentration camp, where he was probably murdered immediately after his arrival.

== Selected filmography ==
- The Uncanny House (1916)
- Prostitution (1919)
- The Duty to Live (1919)
- Die Arche (1919)
- The Count of Cagliostro (1920)
- Va banque (1920)
- Indian Revenge (1920)
- Temperamental Artist (1920)
- The Woman Without a Soul (1920)
- The Story of a Maid (1921)
- The Last Hour (1921)
- Peter Voss, Thief of Millions (1921)
- His Excellency from Madagascar (1922)
- The Girl with the Mask (1922)
- Money in the Streets (1922)
- The Little Napoleon (1923)
- Paradise in the Snow (1923)
- The Three Marys (1923)
- The Slipper Hero (1923)
- Claire (1924)
- Comedians of Life (1924)
- The Wonderful Adventure (1924)
- Mother and Child (1924)
- Father Voss (1925)
- Reluctant Imposter (1925)
- Love Story (1925)
- Shadows of the Metropolis (1925)
- The Adventures of Sybil Brent (1925)
- Niniche (1925)
- Chamber Music (1925)
- Flight Around the World (1925)
- Express Train of Love (1925)
- The Adventure of Mr. Philip Collins (1925)
- A Waltz Dream (1925)
- Three Cuckoo Clocks (1926)
- Grandstand for General Staff (1926)
- The Great Duchess (1926)
- Maytime (1926)
- The Boxer's Bride (1926)
- The Wooing of Eve (1926)
- Heads Up, Charley (1927)
- The Most Beautiful Legs of Berlin (1927)
- The Imaginary Baron (1927)
- My Aunt, Your Aunt (1927)
- The Prince of Pappenheim (1927)
- The Master of Nuremberg (1927)
- The Lady with the Tiger Skin (1927)
- Secrets of the Orient (1928)
- Looping the Loop (1928)
- The Last Night (1928)
- The Blue Mouse (1928)
- Man Against Man (1928)
- The Abduction of the Sabine Women (1928)
- Two Red Roses (1928)
- His Strongest Weapon (1928)
- Charlotte Somewhat Crazy (1928)
- Her Dark Secret (1929)
- Men Without Work (1929)
- The Black Domino (1929)
- Taxi at Midnight (1929)
- The Convict from Istanbul (1929)
- The Blue Angel (1930)
- The Immortal Vagabond (1930)
- People in the Fire (1930)
- Waltz of Love (1930)
- Darling of the Gods (1930)
- Burglars (1930)
- Her Grace Commands (1931)
- Caught in the Act (1931)
- Princess, At Your Orders! (1931)
- Der Kongreß tanzt (1931)
- Inquest (1931)
- Yorck (1931)
- About an Inquest (1931)
- The Victor (1932)
- I by Day, You by Night (1932)
- Congress Dances (1932)
- Storms of Passion (1932)
- Man Without a Name (1932)
- Early to Bed (1933)
- Waltz War (1933)
- The Empress and I (1933)
- The Only Girl (1933)
- Court Waltzes (1933)
- Caravan (1934)
- Liliom (1934)
- Paradise for Two (1937)
- Lights of Paris (1938)
- Crossroads (1938)

== Bibliography ==
- Kosta, Barbara. Willing Seduction: The Blue Angel, Marlene Dietrich, and Mass Culture. Berghahn Books, 2009.
