= Georg Baselt =

German actor (1869–1928)

- Born: 23 August 1869; Breslau, Kingdom of Prussia
- Died: 20 June 1928 (aged 58); Berlin, Germany
- Occupation: Actor
- Years active: 1890-1927

Georg Baselt (23 August 1869 – 20 June 1928) was a German stage and film actor. He appeared in more than thirty films from 1915 to 1927.

== Selected filmography ==
Year	Title	Role	Notes
1918	The Blue Mauritius		
1922	The Stowaway		
1922	The Count of Charolais		
1922	Lola Montez, the King's Dancer		
1922	The False Dimitri		
1922	Maciste and the Javanese		
1923	The Woman Worth Millions	Gospodar von Antivari	
1924	The Great Unknown		
1925	The Ascent of Little Lilian		
1925	The Girl with a Patron		
1925	The Humble Man and the Chanteuse		
1926	People to Each Other		
1926	Roses from the South		
1927	Attorney for the Heart	William Pitt	
