= Willi Wolff =

German screenwriter, film producer, and director

- Born: 16 April 1883; Schonebeck, German Empire
- Died: 6 April 1947 (aged 63); Nice, France
- Occupations: screenwriter, producer, director
- Years active: 1919–1935
- Spouse: Ellen Richter (m. 1923)

Willi Wolff (16 April 1883 – 6 April 1947) was a German screenwriter, film producer, and director. He was married to the silent film star Ellen Richter, whose films he often worked on.

== Selected filmography ==
=== Director ===
- Lola Montez, the King's Dancer (1922)
- The Great Unknown (1924)
- Flight Around the World (1925)
- Shadows of the Metropolis (1925)
- The Great Duchess (1926)
- Maytime (1926)
- The Imaginary Baron (1927)
- The Most Beautiful Legs of Berlin (1927)
- The Lady with the Tiger Skin (1927)
- Heads Up, Charley (1927)
- Moral (1928)
- Immorality (1928)
- The Woman Without Nerves (1930)
- Police Spy 77 (1930)
- The Adventurer of Tunis (1931)
- Madame Pompadour (1931)
- A Caprice of Pompadour (1931)
- The Secret of Johann Orth (1932)
- Manolescu, Prince of Thieves (1933)

=== Screenwriter ===
- The Monastery of Sendomir (1919)
- The Teahouse of the Ten Lotus Flowers (1919)
- Out of the Depths (1919)
- Napoleon and the Little Washerwoman (1920)
- The Love of a Thief (1920)
- Mary Tudor (1920)
- Princess Woronzoff (1920)
- The Riddle of the Sphinx (1921)
- The Adventuress of Monte Carlo (1921)
- The White Death (1921)

== Bibliography ==
- Bach, Steven. Marlene Dietrich: Life and Legend. University of Minnesota Press, 2011.
- Ragowski, Christian. The Many Faces of Weimar Cinema: Rediscovering Germany's Filmic Legacy. Camden House, 2010.
