= Charles Puffy =

Hungarian actor

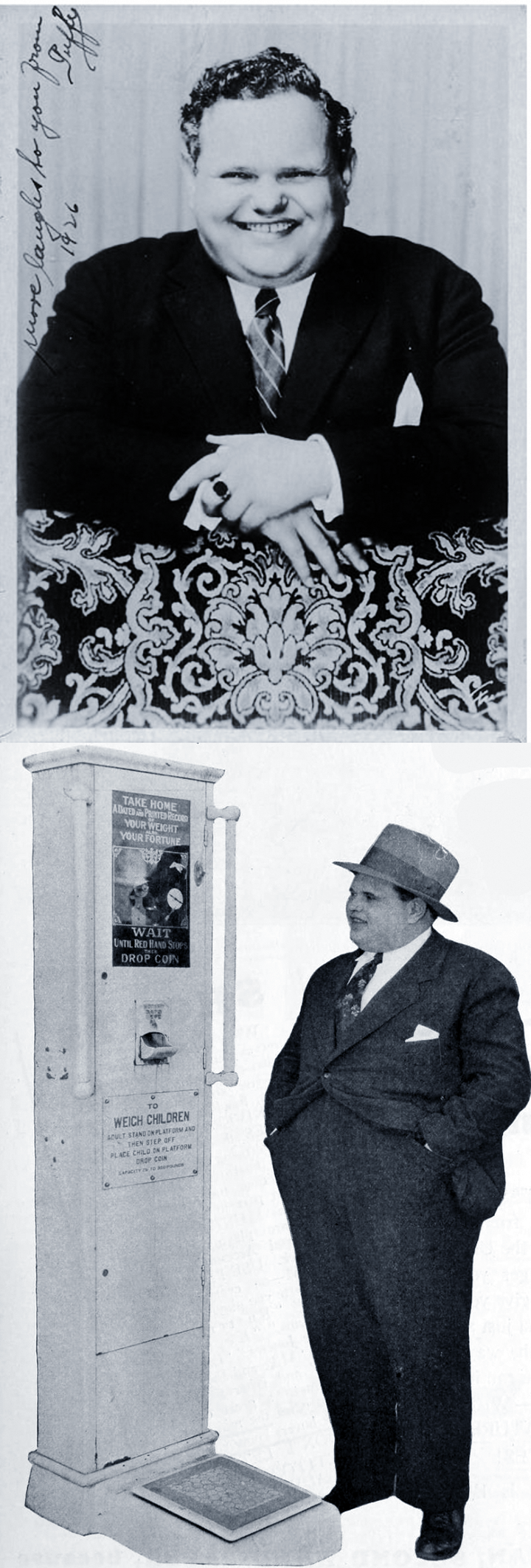
- Born: Károly Hochstadt; 3 November 1884; Budapest, Austria-Hungary
- Died: 1942 or 1943; Tokyo, Japan or Karaganda, Soviet Union (now Kazakhstan)
- Other names: Karl Huszar; Charles Huszar-Puffy; Karl Huszar-Puffy; Károly Huszár
- Occupation: Actor
- Years active: 1914–1938

Charles Puffy (born Károly Hochstein; 3 November 1884 – 1942 or 1943) was a Hungarian film actor.

== Biography ==
Hochstein appeared in more than 130 films between 1914 and 1938. He was the only slapstick star in Hungary's silent film era, appearing under the name "Pufi" (meaning "Fatty" in Hungarian, referring to his weight and his resemblance to Roscoe Arbuckle) and Carlie Puffy in the United States for Universal Studios. His other stage names were Károly Huszár or Pufi Huszár. Besides his work on films, he frequently appeared on stage, mostly in comical roles.

Later, he worked in films in both Germany and the United States, including such classics as Fritz Lang's Dr. Mabuse, der Spieler (Dr. Mabuse, the Gambler) (1922) and Josef von Sternberg's Der blaue Engel (The Blue Angel) (1930). He used the names "Karl Huszar", "Karl Huszar-Puffy" or "Charles Puffy". In the sound era, he returned to his native Hungary, where he was featured in smaller roles in a number of films.

Puffy was Jewish, and decided to flee Hungary when the Holocaust started. He and his wife tried to get away to the United States, but Puffy died mid-way, in Tokyo, Japan. Other sources say that he and his wife were captured by the Red Army and imprisoned in a Gulag in Karaganda, Kazakhstan. Puffy participated in the camp's amateur acting company, but after one year in capture, he died of diphtheria.

== Partial filmography ==
- Tavasz a télben (1917)
- Az Ezredes (1917) aka The Colonel
- St. Peter's Umbrella (1917)
- Lili (1918)
- The Three Aunts (1921)
- About the Son (1921)
- The Convict of Cayenne (1921)
- The Earl of Essex (1922)
- Open All Night (1924)
- The Great Unknown (1924)
- The Love Thief (1926)
- The Mystery Club (1926)
- A Man's Past (1927)
- The Private Life of Helen of Troy (1927)
- Love Me and the World Is Mine (1928)
- The Man Who Laughs (1928)
- Yellow Lily (1928)
- My Heart is a Jazz Band (1929)
- The Hero of Every Girl's Dream (1929)
- Land Without Women (1929)
- My Sister and I (1929)
- Father and Son (1929)
- My Daughter's Tutor (1929)
- Ich küsse Ihre Hand, Madame (1929)
- The Great Longing (1930)
- Next, Please! (1930)
- The King of Paris (1930)
- The Adventurer of Tunis (1931)
- A Crafty Youth (1931)
- The Yellow House of Rio (1931)
- My Cousin from Warsaw (1931)
- Twice Married (1930)
- The Mad Bomberg (1932)
- Five from the Jazz Band (1932)
- Scandal in Budapest (1933)
- The Rakoczi March (1933)
- Miss Iza (1933)
- Romance in Budapest (1933)
- Little Mother (1935)
- Help, I'm an Heiress (1937)
- Man Sometimes Errs (1938)
