= Hubertus Castle =

Hubert's Castle (German:Schloß Hubertus) may refer to

- Hubertus Castle (novel) an 1895 German novel by Ludwig Ganghofer
- Hubertus Castle (1934 film)
- Hubertus Castle (1954 film)
- Hubertus Castle (1973 film)
