= Circus Beely =

1927 film directed by Harry Piel

- Harry Piel in a scene from the film
- Directed by: Harry Piel
- Written by: Max Bauer
- Starring: Harry Piel
- Cinematography: Georg Muschner; Gotthardt Wolf
- Music by: Hans May
- Production company: Nero Film
- Release date: 14 January 1927
- Country: Germany
- Languages: Silent; German intertitles

Circus Beely or What's Going On at the Beely Circus? (German: Was ist los im Zirkus Beely?) is a 1927 German silent thriller film directed by and starring Harry Piel.

The film's sets were designed by the art director Kurt Richter.

== Cast ==
- Harry Piel as Harry Peel
- Charly Berger as Allan Kean
- Eugen Burg as Zirkusmanager
- Fritz Greiner as Kriminalkommissar Bull
- Erich Kaiser-Titz as Doktor Oskar Waldow
- Ilona Karolewna as Rose Jackson
- Max Ralph-Ostermann as Robert Jackson
- Hanni Weisse as Anita de Moran

== Bibliography ==
- Grange, William. Cultural Chronicle of the Weimar Republic. Scarecrow Press, 2008.
