= Judith Trachtenberg =

Judith Trachtenberg may refer to:

- Judith Trachtenberg (novel), an 1890 novel by the Austrian writer Karl Emil Franzos
- Judith Trachtenberg (film), a 1920 German silent film adaptation directed by Henrik Galeen
