= Josef Peterhans =

German actor

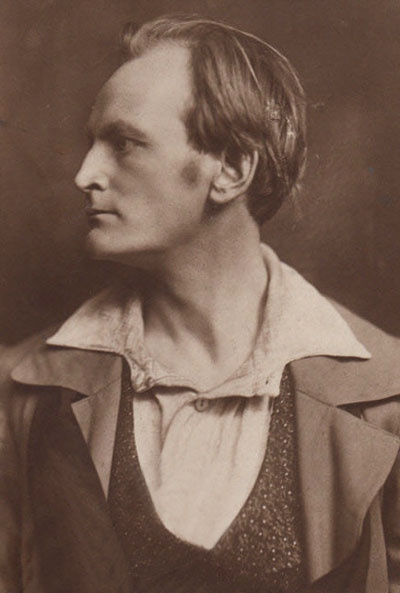
- Peterhans c. 1920
- Born: Josef Thomas Peterhans; 4 December 1882; Cologne, German Empire
- Died: 3 February 1960 (aged 77); Berlin, West Germany
- Occupation: Actor
- Years active: 1902–1942

Josef Thomas Peterhans (4 December 1882 – 3 February 1960) was a German stage and film actor.

== Biography ==
Peterhans began his stage career in 1902, aged twenty. He began his film acting career with the film Der Todessprung in 1916. Before acting in films he played at theaters in the province and in Berlin. He served in the military from 1914 to 1917. He continued his career by playing supporting roles in films like Und wenn ich lieb', nimm Dich in acht (1917), Um Krone und Peitsche (1918), Das Lied des Narren (1919). In Um Krone und Peitsche he had starred alongside the famous actress Fern Andra. In 1920 he starred in 9 films including Salome, Auri sacra fames - Der verfluchte Hunger nach Gold, Christian Wahnschaffe: Weltbrand and The Women House of Brescia. The last one was rejected by the British Board of Film Classification on grounds of prostitution depicted in the film.

Peterhans played a supporting character in the 1925 Arthur von Gerlach-directed Chronicles of the Gray House. From 1926 to 1931 he appeared in only two films — Night of Mystery (1927) and Panic (1928). After the advent of talkies he again became active in the film industry and starred in several films including The Pride of Company Three (1931) and The Mad Bomberg (1932). He played a pastor in William Tell (1933), a marshal in Hundred Days (1934), a forester in Victoria (1935), a deputy in Pour le Mérite (1938), a policeman in Frau Luna (1941) and a general in Fridericus (1937) and The Great King (1941). He also played the role of an Indian in Indian Revenge (1920) and in the double roles in The Tiger of Eschnapur and The Indian Tomb (both 1938). His last film was Die Entlassung (1942). He spent his life in Berlin-Steglitz. He ended his career with the second World War.

== Selected filmography ==
- Spring Storms (1918)
- Crown and Whip (1919)
- Indian Revenge (1920)
- Christian Wahnschaffe (1920)
- The Haunting of Castle Kitay (1920)
- William Tell (1923)
- Chronicles of the Gray House (1925)
- The Poacher (1926)
- Night of Mystery (1927)
- Panic (1928)
- Marschall Vorwärts (1932)
- The Mad Bomberg (1932)
- The Pride of Company Three (1932)
- Today Is the Day (1933)
- William Tell (1934)
- Victoria (1935)
- Hundred Days (1935)
- Fridericus (1937)
- The Tiger of Eschnapur (1938)
- The Indian Tomb (1938)
- Comrades at Sea (1938)
- Trenck the Pandur (1940)
- Jud Süß (1940)
- The Great King (1942)
- Die Entlassung (1942)
