= The Apprentice Diplomat =

1919 film

- German: Der Diplomatensäugling
- Directed by: Erich Schönfelder
- Produced by: Paul Heidemann
- Starring: Paul Heidemann; Max Zilzer; Mabel May-Yong
- Release date: 17 August 1919
- Country: Germany
- Languages: Silent; German intertitles

The Apprentice Diplomat (German: Der Diplomatensäugling) is a 1919 German silent film directed by Erich Schönfelder and starring Paul Heidemann, Max Zilzer and Mabel May-Yong.
