= The Radio Marriage =

1924 film

- German: Die Radio Heirat
- Directed by: Wilhelm Prager
- Written by: Willy Rath; Wilhelm Prager
- Starring: Maria Bard; Eduard von Winterstein; Hermann Thimig
- Cinematography: Vilmos Fenyes
- Production company: Pe-Ge-Film
- Distributed by: UFA
- Release date: 5 March 1924
- Country: Germany
- Languages: Silent; German intertitles

The Radio Marriage (German:Die Radio Heirat) is a 1924 German silent film directed by Wilhelm Prager and starring Maria Bard, Eduard von Winterstein and Hermann Thimig.

== Cast ==
In alphabetical order

- Erna Bahls
- Maria Bard
- Hans Behrendt
- Paul Biensfeldt
- Josef Dischner
- Alexander Granach
- Konstanze Grobe
- Hans Junkermann
- Erwin Kopp
- Alfred Paster
- Albert Paulig
- Ernst Pittschau
- Karl Platen
- Max Pohl
- Adele Sandrock
- Franz Schönfeld
- Hermann Thimig
- Jakob Tiedtke
- Ferdinand von Alten
- Eduard von Winterstein
- Hans Wassmann

== Bibliography ==
- Hans-Michael Bock and Tim Bergfelder. The Concise Cinegraph: An Encyclopedia of German Cinema. Berghahn Books.
