= Night of Mystery =

Night of Mystery may refer to:

- Night of Mystery (1937 film), an American mystery film
- Night of Mystery (1927 film), a German silent thriller film
