= Man Against Man =

Man Against Man may refer to:

- Man Against Man (1928 film), a German silent thriller film
- Man Against Man (1924 film), a German silent drama film

== See also ==
- Mann gegen Mann, a song by Rammstein
