= When the Young Wine Blossoms =

When the Young Wine Blossoms may refer to:

- When the Young Wine Blossoms (1927 film), a German silent comedy film
- When the Young Wine Blossoms (1943 film), a German comedy film
