= The Black Pierrot =

1926 film directed by Harry Piel

- French poster
- Directed by: Harry Piel
- Written by: Edmund Heuberger; Leo Leipel; Harry Piel
- Starring: Harry Piel; Dary Holm
- Cinematography: Georg Muschner; Gotthardt Wolf
- Production company: Phoebus Film
- Distributed by: Phoebus Film
- Release date: 31 May 1926
- Country: Germany
- Languages: Silent; German intertitles

The Black Pierrot (German: Der schwarze Pierrot) is a 1926 German silent film directed by and starring Harry Piel.

The film's sets were designed by the art director Kurt Richter.

== Cast ==
In alphabetical order
- Charly Berger as Victor Peyrol
- Fritz Greiner as Don Gil den Montavan
- Dary Holm as Madame Madeleine
- Ilona Karolewna as Isabella Batista
- Jenny Marba as Mutter
- Boris Michailow as Holzfäller Balthasar
- Albert Paulig as Phil Monnard
- Heinrich Peer as Nicodemus Word
- Harry Piel as Coello

== Bibliography ==
- Bleckman, Matias (1992). Harry Piel: ein Kino-Mythos und seine Zeit. Düsseldorf: Filminstitut der Landeshaupstadt Düsseldorf. ISBN 978-3-929098-01-3.
