= Spring Storms =

- Directed by: Fern Andra
- Written by: Fern Andra
- Produced by: Georg Bluen
- Starring: Fern Andra; Josef Peterhans; Reinhold Schünzel
- Production company: Fern Andra-Film
- Release date: 22 August 1918
- Country: Germany
- Languages: Silent; German intertitles

Spring Storms or Spring Storms in the Autumn of Life (German: Frühlingsstürme im Herbste des Lebens) is a 1918 German silent drama film directed by and starring Fern Andra. It also features Josef Peterhans and Reinhold Schünzel.

== Cast ==
- Fern Andra as Gräfin von Hagen
- Josef Peterhans as Baron Joseph Königswart
- Reinhold Schünzel as Reinhold, Neffe von Königswart
- Hella Thornegg as Reinholds Mutter
- Paul Meffert as Vater der Komtesse

== Bibliography ==
- Bock, Hans-Michael & Bergfelder, Tim. The Concise CineGraph. Encyclopedia of German Cinema. Berghahn Books, 2009.
