= Brother Bernhard =

1929 film

- Directed by: Franz Seitz, Sr.
- Written by: Joseph Dalman
- Starring: Vera Schmiterlöw; Walter Grüters; Will Dohm
- Cinematography: Franz Koch
- Production company: Münchner Lichtspielkunst
- Distributed by: Bavaria Film
- Release date: 1929
- Country: Germany
- Language: German

Brother Bernhard (German: Bruder Bernhard or Der Eremit) is a 1929 German film directed by Franz Seitz, Sr. and starring Vera Schmiterlöw, Walter Grüters and Will Dohm.

The film's art direction was by Willy Reiber. It was made at the Emelka Studios in Munich.

== Cast ==
- Vera Schmiterlöw as Christine
- Walter Grüters as Bruder Bernhard
- Will Dohm as Gärtner Robert
- Ferdinand Martini as Bruder Wendelin
- Hermann Nesselträger as Ein Schneider
- Ludwig Rupert as Stief
- Georg Henrich as Prior
- Josef Eichheim as Der alte Knorr
