= The Great Industrialist =

1923 film

- Directed by: Fritz Kaufmann
- Written by: Ruth Goetz; Fritz Kaufmann
- Produced by: Martin Liebenau
- Starring: Walter Brügmann; Maria Forescu; Erich Kaiser-Titz
- Cinematography: Fritz Arno Wagner
- Production company: Metro-Film
- Release date: 22 August 1923
- Country: Germany
- Languages: Silent; German intertitles

The Great Industrialist (German: Der Großindustrielle) is a 1923 German silent film directed by Fritz Kaufmann and starring Walter Brügmann, Maria Forescu and Erich Kaiser-Titz.

The film's sets were designed by the art director Fritz Kraenke.

== Cast ==
- Walter Brügmann as Harry W. Marton
- Maria Forescu as Gesellschafterin
- Erich Kaiser-Titz as John Johnston
- Erna Morena
- Claire Rommer
- Kurt Vespermann

== Bibliography ==
- Alfred Krautz. International directory of cinematographers, set- and costume designers in film, Volume 4. Saur, 1984.
