= His Strongest Weapon =

1928 film directed by Harry Piel

- Directed by: Harry Piel
- Written by: Robert Liebmann; Herbert Nossen; Harry Piel
- Starring: Harry Piel; Vera Schmiterlöw; Philipp Manning
- Cinematography: Ewald Daub; Gotthardt Wolf
- Production company: Ring-Film
- Distributed by: UFA
- Release date: 25 October 1928
- Country: Germany
- Languages: Silent; German intertitles

His Strongest Weapon (German: Seine stärkste Waffe) is a 1928 German silent thriller film directed by Harry Piel and starring Piel, Vera Schmiterlöw and Philipp Manning.

The film's sets were designed by the art director Willi Herrmann.

== Cast ==
- Harry Piel as Harry Petersen, Mann mit dem Motorrad
- Vera Schmiterlöw as Dolly Helmersum, Mädel mit den Tanzbeinen
- Philipp Manning as A. Kinley, Mann mit den Dollars
- Charly Berger as P. C. Ginew, Mann mit dem Acht-Zylinder
- Karl Platen as Anders, Mann mit dem Zigarrenladen
- Alice Torning as Frau Hansen, Frau mit dem Plättbrett
- Carla Bartheel as Fleurettte, Mädchen mit eigenem Auto
- Charles Francois as Mann mit Möbelwagen
- Curt Bullerjahn as Mann mit Möbelwagen
- Alfred Loretto as Mann mit Möbelwagen
- Motte as Mann mit Möbelwagen
- Musotti as Mann mit Möbelwagen
- Oswald Scheffel as Mann mit Möbelwagen
- Franz Sutton as Mann mit Möbelwagen

== Bibliography ==
- Bock, Hans-Michael; Bergfelder, Tim, eds. (2009). The Concise Cinegraph: Encyclopaedia of German Cinema. New York: Berghahn Books. ISBN 978-1-57181-655-9.
