= The Fake Emir =

1924 film directed by Harry Piel

- Hungarian poster
- Directed by: Harry Piel
- Written by: Max Bauer; Edmund Heuberger; Harry Piel
- Produced by: Harry Piel
- Starring: Harry Piel; Hermann Leffler; Claire Rommer
- Cinematography: Georg Muschner; Gotthardt Wolf
- Production company: Hape-Film
- Release date: 4 January 1924
- Country: Germany
- Languages: Silent; German intertitles

The Fake Emir (German: Der falsche Emir) is a 1924 German silent adventure film directed by and starring Harry Piel. It also features Hermann Leffler and Claire Rommer. It was followed by A Dangerous Game.

The film's sets were designed by the art director Kurt Richter.

== Cast ==
In alphabetical order

- Friedrich Berger
- Ruth Beyer as Nelly
- Maria Forescu
- Fred Immler as Hakim
- Hermann Leffler
- Paul Meffert
- Harry Piel as Actor / Emir
- Claire Rommer as Princess Pasantasena
- Ruth Weyher

== Bibliography ==
- Grange, William. Cultural Chronicle of the Weimar Republic. Scarecrow Press, 2008.
