= I Once Had a Beautiful Homeland =

1928 film

- Directed by: Max Mack
- Written by: Gustav Althoff; Willy Rath
- Produced by: Gustav Althoff
- Starring: Leo Peukert; Grete Reinwald; Ernst Rückert
- Cinematography: Theodor Sparkuhl
- Production company: Aco-Film
- Distributed by: Deutsch-Nordische Film-Union
- Release date: 19 January 1928
- Country: Germany
- Languages: Silent; German intertitles

I Once Had a Beautiful Homeland (German: Ich hatte einst ein schönes Vaterland) is a 1928 German silent film directed by Max Mack and starring Leo Peukert, Grete Reinwald, and Ernst Rückert.

The film's art direction was by August Rinaldi.

== Cast ==
- Leo Peukert as Kantinenwirt Bergmann, Feldwebel a.D.
- Grete Reinwald as Grete, seine Tochter
- Ernst Rückert as Leutnant Bernhard v. Degow
- Alexander Granach as Pollaczek, sein Bursche
- Carl Auen as Unteroffizier Zielke
- Max Tobien as Ein Sergeant
- Charles Willy Kayser as Ein südamerikanischer Kaufmann
- Helene von Bolváry as Seine Frau
- Gerd Briese as Beider Sohn
- Hella Gier as Eine Braslinianerin
- Vicky Werckmeister as Yvette
- Viktor Schwannecke as Besitzer eines Hafengasthauses
- Robby Roberts as Sein Kind
- Gustav Püttjer as Matrose Hein
- Paul Strathmann as Ein Trunkenbold
- Mathilde Sussin

== Bibliography ==
- Grange, William (2008). Cultural Chronicle of the Weimar Republic. Lanham, MD: Scarecrow Press. ISBN 978-0-8108-5967-8.
