= The Hurricane on the Mountain =

1922 film

- Directed by: Julien Duvivier
- Written by: Philippe Amiguet; Julien Duvivier
- Starring: Gaston Jacquet; Lotte Lorring
- Cinematography: Gaston Haon
- Production companies: Geneva Films; Société Régionale de Cinématographie
- Distributed by: Agence Générale Cinématographique
- Release date: 5 September 1922
- Running time: 90 minutes
- Country: France
- Languages: Silent; French intertitles

The Hurricane on the Mountain (French: L'ouragan sur la montagne) is a 1922 French silent drama film directed by Julien Duvivier and starring Gaston Jacquet and Lotte Lorring. It was shot at Emelka Studios in Munich.

== Synopsis ==
At a hotel in the Alps, some missing pearls lead to a murder and a killer disguised as police detective.

== Cast ==
- Gaston Jacquet as L'inspecteur David
- Lotte Lorring as Violet Cooper
- Marie Pillar as Olga Orloff
- Camille Beuve as Lord Barnett
- Émile Hesse
- Jean Stelli

== Bibliography ==
- McCann, Ben. Julien Duvivier. Manchester University Press, 2017.
