= Mabel May-Yong =

German actress (born 1884)

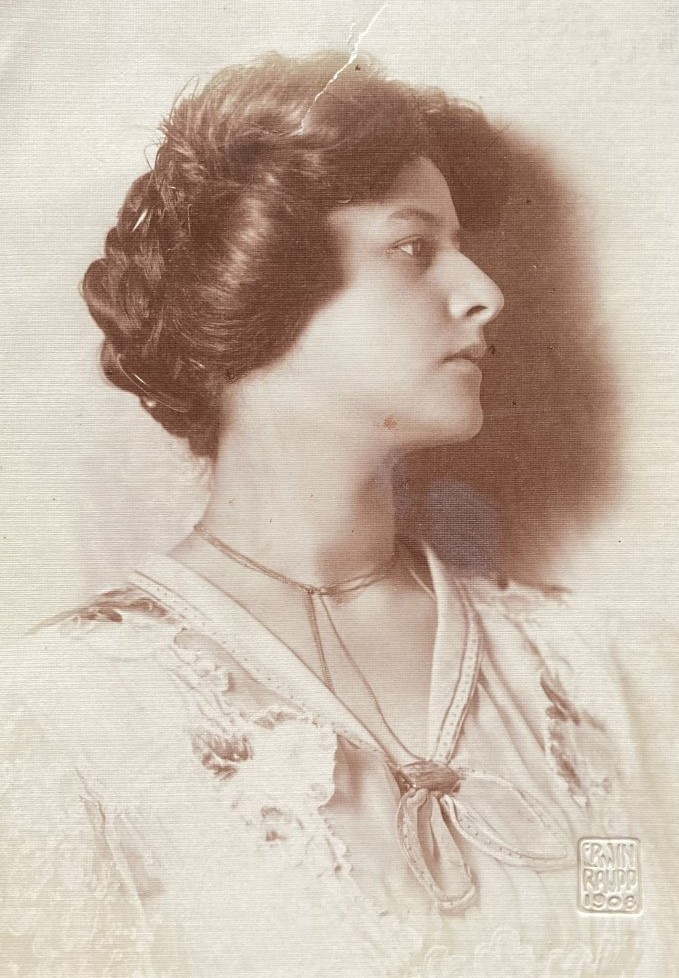
- Born: 28 June 1884; Magdeburg
- Died: 1945?
- Occupation: Actress
- Years active: 1919-1925

Mabel May-Yong (born Alice Mabel Auguste Scharrer, 1884-1945?) was a German film actress of the silent era, known for her exotic roles and costumes. She appeared in around twenty films during the early years of the Weimar Republic.

== Early years ==
May-Yong was born Alice Mabel Auguste Scharrer as the daughter of the businessman Max Richard Albrecht Scharrer and Elizabeth Ann "Lizzie" Hoa-Mai (either from China or Vietnam). She started her career as a belly dancer, wearing provocative costumes in the style of Mata-Hari, and adopted her exotic stage name. May-Yong married in Magdeburg, purportedly into the Schenck zu Schweinsberg noble family. In October 1914, months after the onset of World War I, she arrived in New York from Rotterdam on the ship Rotterdam, as Baroness Alice Schenk zu Schweinsberg, married and living in Berlin, but listing her father, Max Scharrer, living in Magdeburg, as her closest relative. The New York Times of October 28, 1914, reported the arrival at the Astor Theatre of "Baroness Alice Mabel von Schenck zu Schweinsberg, who danced in Germany under the name of Mabel May Yong". She performed at Astor and at the Victoria Theatre and returned to Germany in January 1915. She crossed on the same steamer as Melvin A. Rise, a personal friend of Woodrow Wilson, who approached the German chancellor in Berlin "with a view of sounding them on peace", purportedly after the baroness (May-Yong) had suggested this to Wilson. The White House denied any knowledge of this and this action was said to have undermined Colonel House's peace envoy the next month.

== Film career and later life ==
May-Yong made her first known appearance in a movie in 1919 as Queen Nyleptha in Allan Quatermain, the first film adaptation of the 1887 novel. After some 25 movies, her last known roles were in 1923 in Das Kabinett des Dr. Segat and in 1925 in Entsiegelte Lippen. She then disappeared from the public eye and her death is yet unknown.

== Selected filmography ==
- The Apprentice Diplomat (1919)
- Indian Revenge (1920)
- The Adventure of Doctor Kircheisen (1921)
- The House of Torment (1921)
- The Flight into Death (1921)
- Women Who Commit Adultery (1922)

== Bibliography ==
- Grange, William. Cultural Chronicle of the Weimar Republic. Scarecrow Press, 2008.
