= Betty Bird =

Austrian actress (1901–1998)

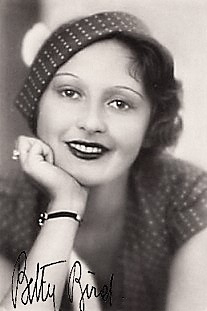
- Betty Bird c. 1930
- Born: Hilde Elisabeth Ptack; 18 June 1901; Vienna, Austria-Hungary
- Died: 4 March 1998 (aged 96); Rome, Italy
- Occupation: Actress
- Years active: 1928–1936

Betty Bird (born Hilde Elisabeth Ptack; 18 June 1901 – 4 March 1998) was an Austrian actress known for Die spanische Fliege (1931), Corazones sin rumbo (1928) and Sturm auf drei Herzen (1930). She was married to Gustav Ucicky until their divorce in 1936.

== Biography ==
Hilde Elisabeth Ptack, was born on 18 June 1901 in Vienna. Her father Ludwig Ptack was secretary to the owner of the Sascha-Filmfabrik, a film production company.

On 23 December 1923 she married the cameraman and later film director Gustav Ucicky.

She received her first acting role in 1927 at age 20, starring in the film Madame Dares an Escapade. With her husband, she moved to Munich and then to Berlin. Continuing her acting career, she often portrayed charming girls in comedy films of the late 1920s and early 1930s. She adopted the stage name Betty Bird.

In August 1936, Betty and Gustav Ucicky divorced and she went on to marry a Czech dentist by the name of Hruska in Rome on 23 December 1937.

She died on 4 March 1998 in Rome at the age of 96.

== Selected filmography ==
- Madame Dares an Escapade (1927)
- Restless Hearts (1928)
- Der Herzensphotograph (1928)
- Der Ladenprinz (1928)
- Behind Monastery Walls (1928)
- The Hound of the Baskervilles (1929)
- The Green Monocle (1929)
- Taxi at Midnight (1929)
- Lady in the Spa (1929)
- The Fourth from the Right (1929)
- The Hero of Every Girl's Dream (1929)
- Waterloo (1929)
- Darling of the Gods (1930)
- A Student's Song of Heidelberg (1930)
- Grock (1931)
- The Spanish Fly (1931)
- The Opera Ball (1931)
- Grandstand for General Staff (1932)
- The Escape to Nice (1932)
- Secret of the Blue Room (1932)
- I Do Not Want to Know Who You Are (1932)
- Salon Dora Green (1933)
- The Emperor's Waltz (1933)
- What Am I Without You (1934)
- Hero for a Night (1935)
