= Johnny Steals Europe =

1932 German film

- Directed by: Harry Piel; Andrew Marton
- Written by: Werner Scheff (novel); Harry Piel
- Produced by: Harry Piel
- Starring: Harry Piel; Dary Holm; Alfred Abel; Margarete Sachse
- Cinematography: Ewald Daub
- Music by: Fritz Wenneis
- Production company: Ariel-Film
- Distributed by: Deutsche Universal-Film
- Release date: 15 June 1932
- Running time: 100 minutes
- Country: Germany
- Language: German

Johnny Steals Europe (German: Jonny stiehlt Europa) is a 1932 German comedy crime film directed by Harry Piel and Andrew Marton and starring Piel, Dary Holm and Alfred Abel. The film was based on a novel by Werner Scheff. It was shot at the Staaken Studios in Berlin and on location on the French Riviera. Released by the German branch of Universal Pictures, it premiered on 15 June 1932.

== Synopsis ==
A German helps a group of Americans to recover Europa, their stolen horse.

== Cast ==
- Harry Piel as Jonny Buck
- Dary Holm as Ursel Matting
- Alfred Abel as Jack Matting
- Margarete Sachse as Miss Pepson
- Walter Steinbeck as Max Dievenak
- Hermann Blaß as Siegfried Hagelberg
- Carl Balhaus as Monk
- Charly Berger as Frontz
- Kurt Lilien as Laberkow
- Wolfgang von Schwindt as Rueckers
- Gerhard Dammann as Wilke
- Hans Wallner as Altkleiderhaendler
- Fritz Spira as Labinger
- Bruno Ziener as Rittmeister

== See also ==
- List of films about horses

== Bibliography ==
- Grange, William (2008). Cultural Chronicle of the Weimar Republic. Scarecrow Press. ISBN 978-0-8108-5967-8.
- Adam, Thomas; Kaufman, Will, eds. (2005). Germany and the Americas: Culture, Politics, And History. ABC-CLIO. ISBN 978-1-85109-628-2.
