= His Greatest Bluff =

1927 film by Henrik Galeen and Harry Piel

- Directed by: Henrik Galeen; Harry Piel
- Written by: Henrik Galeen; Herbert Nossen
- Produced by: Seymour Nebenzal
- Starring: Harry Piel; Toni Tetzlaff; Lotte Lorring; Albert Paulig
- Cinematography: Georg Muschner; Gotthardt Wolf
- Music by: Hans May
- Production company: Nero-Film
- Distributed by: Süd-Film
- Release date: 12 May 1927
- Running time: 108 minutes
- Country: Germany
- Languages: Silent; German intertitles

His Greatest Bluff (German: Sein größter Bluff) is a 1927 German silent comedy film directed by Henrik Galeen and Harry Piel and starring Piel, Toni Tetzlaff and Lotte Lorring. Its title is sometimes translated as His Biggest Bluff. Today, the film is best known for the early role it offered to Marlene Dietrich who was only cast after great effort by her agents. The film was shot at the Grunewald Studios, located in Western Berlin, during January and February 1927. It premiered on 12 May 1927 at the Alhambra-Palast in Berlin.

== Cast ==
- Harry Piel as Henry & Harry Devall
- Toni Tetzlaff as Madame Andersson
- Lotte Lorring as Tilly
- Albert Paulig as Mimikry
- Fritz Greiner as Hennessy
- Charly Berger as Count. Koks
- Boris Michailow as Sherry
- Marlene Dietrich as Yvette
- Paul Walker as Goliath, a dwarf
- Kurt Gerron as Rajah
- Eugen Burg as Police
- Ossip Darmatow as Count. Apollinaris
- Vicky Werckmeister as Suzanne
- Paul Moleska as Crook
- Oswald Scheffel as Crook
- Curt Bullerjahn as Crook
- Charles Francois as Crook
- Wolfgang von Schwindt as Crook

== Bibliography ==
- Bach, Steven. Marlene Dietrich: Life and Legend. University of Minnesota Press, 2011
- Gemünden, Gerd & Desjardins, Mary R. Dietrich Icon. Duke University Press, 2007.
