= Men Without Work (film) =

1929 film directed by Harry Piel

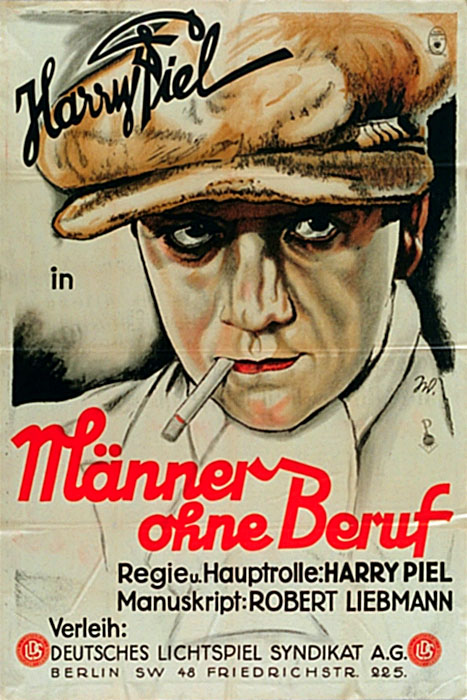
- Directed by: Harry Piel
- Written by: Robert Liebmann
- Produced by: Harry Piel
- Starring: Harry Piel; Dary Holm; Edith Meinhard
- Cinematography: Ewald Daub; Gotthardt Wolf
- Production company: Ariel Film
- Distributed by: Deutsche Lichtspiel-Syndikat
- Release date: 15 August 1929
- Running time: 121 minutes
- Country: Germany
- Languages: Silent; German intertitles

Men Without Work (German: Männer ohne Beruf) is a 1929 German silent action film directed by and starring Harry Piel and featuring Dary Holm and Edith Meinhard. It was shot at the Staaken Studios in Berlin and on location in Marseille. The film's sets were designed by the art director Robert Neppach. It premiered at the UFA-Palast am Zoo.

== Cast ==
- Harry Piel as Harry Perol
- Bruno Ziener as Dupont
- Albert Paulig as René Duval
- Aruth Wartan as José Servantes
- Hans Behal as Der schöne Alfons
- José Davert as Mann ohne Beruf
- Charly Berger as Mann ohne Beruf
- Charles Francois as Mann ohne Beruf
- Georg John as Odysseus, der 'Künstler'
- Dary Holm as Madeleine
- Edith Meinhard as Mado
- Grana Merita as Liliane
- Olga Limburg as Directrice
- Otto Wallburg as Der Standesbeamte
- Maria Forescu as Die Bardame

== Bibliography ==
- Parish, James Robert; Canham, Kingsley (1976). Film Directors Guide: Western Europe. Metuchen, NJ: Scarecrow Press. ISBN 978-0-8108-0908-6.
