= Indian Revenge =

1920 film

- German: Indische Rache
- Directed by: Georg Jacoby; Léo Lasko
- Written by: Georg Jacoby; Robert Liebmann
- Produced by: Paul Davidson
- Starring: Georg Alexander; Mady Christians; Harry Liedtke
- Cinematography: Frederik Fuglsang
- Production company: PAGU
- Distributed by: UFA
- Release date: April 1920
- Country: Germany
- Languages: Silent; German intertitles

Indian Revenge (German: Indische Rache) is a 1920 German silent adventure film directed by Georg Jacoby and Léo Lasko and starring Georg Alexander, Mady Christians, and Harry Liedtke.

The film's sets were designed by the art director Kurt Richter.

== Cast ==
In alphabetical order

- Georg Alexander as Bob Dickson
- Mady Christians
- Ernst Dernburg as William Astor
- Max Laurence as captain
- Harry Liedtke as Edward
- Mabel May-Yong
- Edith Meller as Ellinor Glyn
- Albert Patry
- Josef Peterhans as Chief Priest of Kali
- Emil Rameau as Indian #2
- Bruno Wiesner as Indian #1
- Bruno Ziener
