= The Hunter of Fall (1918 film) =

1918 film

- Directed by: Ludwig Beck
- Written by: Ludwig Ganghofer (novel); Ludwig Beck
- Starring: Ludwig Beck; Viktor Gehring
- Production company: Münchener Kunstfilm
- Release date: December 1918
- Country: Germany
- Languages: Silent; German intertitles

The Hunter of Fall (German: Der Jäger von Fall) is a 1918 German silent drama film directed by and starring Ludwig Beck. It is based on the 1883 novel The Hunter of Fall by Ludwig Ganghofer.

== Cast ==
- Ludwig Beck as Lenzl
- Viktor Gehring as Jäger Friedl
- Fritz Greiner as Blasi
- Franz Gruber
- Josef Kirchner-Lang
- Thea Steinbrecher as Modei
- Toni Wittels as Försterin

== Bibliography ==
- Goble, Alan. The Complete Index to Literary Sources in Film. Walter de Gruyter, 1999.
