= A Dangerous Game (1924 film) =

1924 film by Harry Piel

- Directed by: Harry Piel
- Written by: Max Bauer; Edmund Heuberger; Harry Piel
- Produced by: Harry Piel
- Starring: Harry Piel; Hermann Leffler; Claire Rommer
- Cinematography: Georg Muschner; Gotthardt Wolf
- Production company: Hape-Film
- Release date: 4 January 1924
- Country: Germany
- Languages: Silent; German intertitles

A Dangerous Game (German: Ein gefährliches Spiel) is a 1924 German silent adventure film directed by Harry Piel and starring Piel, Hermann Leffler and Claire Rommer. It is the sequel to The Fake Emir.

The film's sets were designed by the art director Kurt Richter.

== Cast ==
In alphabetical order

- Friedrich Berger
- Ruth Beyer
- Maria Forescu
- Fred Immler
- Hermann Leffler
- Paul Meffert
- Harry Piel
- Claire Rommer
- Ruth Weyher

== Bibliography ==
- Grange, William. Cultural Chronicle of the Weimar Republic. Scarecrow Press, 2008.
