= The Emperor's Old Clothes =

1923 film directed by Franz Seitz

- Directed by: Franz Seitz
- Written by: Robert Heymann
- Starring: Dary Holm; Ernst Rückert; Fritz Greiner
- Cinematography: Fritz Biller
- Production company: Union-Film
- Release date: 24 March 1923
- Country: Germany
- Languages: Silent; German intertitles

The Emperor's Old Clothes (German: Des Kaisers alte Kleider) is a 1923 German silent film directed by Franz Seitz and starring Dary Holm, Ernst Rückert and Fritz Greiner.

The film's sets were designed by the art directors Kurt Dürnhöfer and Karl Machus.

== Cast ==
- Dary Holm
- Ernst Rückert
- Fritz Greiner
- Rudolf Basil
- Lili Dominici
- Frau Thoma
- Max Weydner

== Bibliography ==
- Alfred Krautz. International directory of cinematographers, set- and costume designers in film, Volume 4. Saur, 1984.
