= Dangers of the Engagement Period =

1930 film

- Directed by: Fred Sauer
- Written by: Walter Schlee; Walter Wassermann
- Produced by: Robert Leistenschneider
- Starring: Marlene Dietrich; Willi Forst; Lotte Lorring
- Cinematography: László Schäffer
- Production company: Strauss Film
- Distributed by: Hegewald Film
- Release date: 21 February 1930
- Running time: 80 minutes
- Country: Germany
- Languages: Silent; German intertitles

Dangers of the Engagement Period (German: Gefahren der Brautzeit) is a 1930 German silent comedy film directed by Fred Sauer and starring Marlene Dietrich, Willi Forst, and Lotte Lorring. It is also known by the alternative title of Nights of Love (German: Liebesnächte).

The film's sets were designed by the art director Max Heilbronner. It was shot at the Staaken Studios in Berlin and on location in Scheveningen in the Netherlands. Shot as a silent during September and October 1929, it was not released until February the following year, by which time sound films were increasingly dominant. It was given a favourable review by Lotte Eisner in the Film-Kurier.

While making the film, Dietrich was also appearing in a stage show alongside Hans Albers. It was her final film before her breakthrough role in The Blue Angel, which made her an international star and led to her departure for Hollywood.

== Synopsis ==
During a railway journey, Baron van Geldern meets Evelyne, an attractive young woman travelling in the same carriage. After the train is derailed, they spend a night together at a hotel, and the womanizer falls in love with her. Complications ensue when he discovers that she is engaged to his American friend.

== Cast ==
- Marlene Dietrich as Evelyne
- Willi Forst as Baron van Geldern
- Lotte Lorring as Yvette
- Elza Temary as Florence
- Ernst Stahl-Nachbaur as McClure
- Bruno Ziener as Miller
- Albert Hörrmann
- Otto Kronburger
- Oskar Sima
- Hans Wallner

== Bibliography ==
- Chandler, Charlotte (2011). Marlene: Marlene Dietrich, A Personal Biography. New York: Simon and Schuster. ISBN 978-1-4391-8844-6.
- Kosta, Barbara (2009). Willing Seduction: The Blue Angel, Marlene Dietrich, and Mass Culture. New York: Berghahn Books. ISBN 978-0-85745-619-9.
