= Trutzi from Trutzberg =

1922 film

- Directed by: Peter Ostermayr; Ernst B. Hey
- Written by: Ludwig Ganghofer (novel); Ernst Blum-Fey
- Produced by: Peter Ostermayr
- Starring: Toni Wittels; Viktor Gehring
- Cinematography: Franz Planer
- Production company: Münchner Lichtspielkunst
- Distributed by: Bavaria Film
- Release date: 10 January 1922
- Country: Germany
- Languages: Silent; German intertitles

Trutzi from Trutzberg (German: Die Trutze von Trutzberg) is a 1922 German silent comedy film directed by Peter Ostermayr and Ernst B. Hey and starring Toni Wittels and Viktor Gehring.

It was shot at the Bavaria Studios in Munich. The film's sets were designed by the art director Willy Reiber.

== Cast ==
- Carl Dalmonico as Burgpfaff
- Viktor Gehring as Schäfer Lien
- Curt Gerdes as Ritter Melchior, Trutz auf Trutzberg
- Theo Kasper as Junker Eberhard
- Hermann Pfanz as Ritter Korbin auf Püchstein
- Camilo Sacchetto as Heinrich von der Seeburg
- Thea Steinbrecher as Magd Pernella, genannt "das rote Übel"
- Franz Stury as Herzog
- Hildegard Wall as Tochter des Junkers
- Toni Wittels as Frau Engelein

== See also ==
- The Shepherd from Trutzberg (1959)

== Bibliography ==
- Grange, William. Cultural Chronicle of the Weimar Republic. Scarecrow Press, 2008.
