= The Black Domino (film) =

1929 film

- Directed by: Victor Janson
- Written by: Eugène Scribe (opera Le domino noir); Robert Liebmann; Walter Reisch
- Produced by: Rudolf Walther-Fein
- Starring: Hans Junkermann; Vera Schmiterlöw; Max Ehrlich
- Cinematography: Edoardo Lamberti; Guido Seeber
- Production company: Aafa-Film
- Distributed by: Aafa-Film
- Release date: 19 August 1929
- Country: Germany
- Languages: Silent; German intertitles

The Black Domino (German: Der schwarze Domino) is a 1929 German silent comedy film directed by Victor Janson and starring Hans Junkermann, Vera Schmiterlöw and Max Ehrlich. It is based on the 1837 comic opera Le domino noir. It was shot at the Staaken Studiosin Berlin. The film's art direction was by Botho Hoefer and Hans Minzloff.

== Cast ==
- Hans Junkermann as Seine Exzellenz Graf Saint Lucar
- Vera Schmiterlöw as Angela, seine Tochter
- Max Ehrlich as Gesandtschaftssekretär Leonidas Elfort
- Valeria Blanka as Madame Elfort
- Harry Liedtke as Horace de Massarena, Gesandtschaftssekretär
- Ernő Verebes as Juliano
- Lotte Lorring as Zizzi Loraine
- Hermann Picha as Pamphile
- Karl Platen as Jean, Diener

== Bibliography ==
- Bock, Hans-Michael; Bergfelder, Tim, eds. (2009). The Concise Cinegraph: Encyclopaedia of German Cinema. New York: Berghahn Books. ISBN 978-1-57181-655-9.
