= Judith Trachtenberg (film) =

1920 film

- Directed by: Henrik Galeen
- Written by: Karl Emil Franzos (novel); Franz Schulz
- Starring: Leontine Kühnberg; Ernst Deutsch; Leonhard Haskel; Paul Otto
- Cinematography: Gotthardt Wolf
- Production company: Neos-Film
- Distributed by: Doktram-Film
- Release date: 1920
- Country: Germany
- Languages: Silent; German intertitles

Judith Trachtenberg is a 1920 German silent drama film directed by Henrik Galeen and starring Leontine Kühnberg, Ernst Deutsch and Leonhard Haskel. It was based on the 1890 novel of the same title by Karl Emil Franzos. In 1932 it was released in the United States, re-edited to include sound, under the alternative title A Daughter of Her People. It was one of a significant cycle of films in the early 1920s which dealt with issues of Jewish cultural assimilation including Love One Another (1922), The Ancient Law (1923) and The City Without Jews (1924). The film's plotline of a Jewish woman becoming involved with an aristocratic figure follows what is known as an "Esterka story".

== Synopsis ==
In the nineteenth century, a young Jewish woman living in the part of Poland controlled by Austria, meets an Austrian Count at a ball held by one of her father's business associates. After he rescues her from the unwanted attentions of a Polish army officer, they fall in love. She falls pregnant, and they live together in a Common-law marriage. Her family are horrified by the match and make her an outcast. Distraught by this, she ultimately commits suicide by drowning herself in a lake.

== Cast ==
- Leontine Kühnberg as Judith Trachtenberg
- Ernst Deutsch as Judith's Brother
- Leonhard Haskel as Father Trachtenberg
- Paul Otto as Count Agenor Baranowski
- Hermann Vallentin as Prefect von Wroblewski
- Max Adalbert as Fürst Metternich
- Friedrich Kühne as Ignaz Trudka
- Ernst Pröckl as Severin von Tronski
- Margarete Kupfer as Frau von Wroblewski
- Frida Richard as Mirjam

== Bibliography ==
- Prawer, S.S. Between Two Worlds: The Jewish Presence in German and Austrian Film, 1910-1933. Berghahn Books, 2005.
