= The Market of Life =

1928 film

- Directed by: Béla Balogh
- Written by: Béla Balogh
- Starring: Gustav Fröhlich; Hans Mierendorff; Vera Schmiterlöw
- Cinematography: Axel Graatkjær
- Production company: Koop-Film
- Distributed by: Lloyd Kinofilm
- Release date: 16 February 1928
- Running time: 65 minutes
- Country: Germany
- Languages: Silent; German intertitles

The Market of Life (German: Jahrmarkt des Lebens) is a 1928 German silent film directed by Béla Balogh and starring Gustav Fröhlich, Hans Mierendorff and Vera Schmiterlöw. The film's sets were designed by the art director Karl Machus. It was released in Britain in 1929.

== Cast ==
- Gustav Fröhlich
- Hans Mierendorff
- Vera Schmiterlöw
- Egon von Jordan
- Robert Scholz
- Eva Speyer
- Arnold Korff
- Gerhard Ritterband
- Hertha von Walther
- Alfred Abel
- Wilhelm Diegelmann
- Maria Hofen
- Hermann Picha

== Bibliography ==
- Bock, Hans-Michael & Bergfelder, Tim. The Concise CineGraph. Encyclopedia of German Cinema. Berghahn Books, 2009.
- Lamprecht, Gerhard . Deutsche Stummfilme: 9a . 1927-1931. Deutsche Kinemathek, 1968.
