= The Hero of Every Girl's Dream =

1929 film

- Directed by: Robert Land
- Written by: Walter Reisch
- Produced by: Julius Haimann; Robert Land
- Starring: Harry Liedtke; Betty Bird; Hermine Sterler
- Cinematography: Carl Drews; Gotthardt Wolf
- Production company: Super-Film
- Distributed by: Deutsche Lichtspiel-Syndikat
- Release date: 5 April 1929
- Country: Germany
- Languages: Silent; German intertitles

The Hero of Every Girl's Dream (German: Der Held aller Mädchenträume) is a 1929 German silent film directed by Robert Land and starring Harry Liedtke, Betty Bird and Hermine Sterler.

The film's sets were designed by Robert Neppach.

== Cast ==
- Harry Liedtke as Vicomte de Lormand
- Betty Bird as Marianne Turbon
- Hermine Sterler as Madame Turbon
- Jeanne Helbling as Lolotte
- Gertrud Arnold
- Oreste Bilancia
- Karl Elzer
- Charles Puffy
- Max Maximilian
- Karl Platen
- Anton Pointner
- Rosa Valetti
- Marcel Vibert as Marquis de Corbé

== Bibliography ==
- Prawer, S.S. Between Two Worlds: The Jewish Presence in German and Austrian Film, 1910-1933. Berghahn Books, 2005.
- Ragowski, Christian. The Many Faces of Weimar Cinema: Rediscovering Germany's Filmic Legacy. Camden House, 2010.
