= Hunted Women =

1923 film

- Directed by: Josef Berger
- Written by: Josef Berger
- Starring: Dary Holm
- Production company: Union-Film
- Release date: 1923
- Country: Germany
- Languages: Silent; German intertitles

Hunted Women (German:Gehetzte Frauen) is a 1923 German silent film directed by Josef Berger and starring Dary Holm.

== Cast ==
In alphabetical order

- Rudolf Basil
- Mary Brandt
- Karl Graumann
- Dary Holm
- Ernst Rückert
- Ernst Schrumpf
