= The Night of Queen Isabeau =

1920 film directed by Robert Wiene

- Directed by: Robert Wiene
- Written by: Robert Wiene
- Produced by: Erich Pommer
- Starring: Fern Andra; Fritz Kortner; Hans Heinrich von Twardowski; Elsa Wagner
- Cinematography: Willy Hameister
- Production company: Decla-Bioscop
- Distributed by: Decla
- Release date: November 1920
- Country: Germany
- Languages: Silent; German intertitles

The Night of Queen Isabeau (German: Die Nacht der Königin Isabeau) is a 1920 German silent historical drama film directed by Robert Wiene and starring Fern Andra, Fritz Kortner, Hans Heinrich von Twardowski and Elsa Wagner. The film depicts the marriage between the mad Charles VI of France and his wife Queen Isabeau. It was shot at the Babelsberg Studios in Berlin. The film is now considered a lost film, but contemporary reviews praised Wiene's direction. The story revolves around insanity, a common theme in his films.

== Cast ==
- Fern Andra as Königin Isabeau
- Fritz Kortner as Connetable
- Hans Heinrich von Twardowski as Page
- Elsa Wagner
- Lothar Müthel as Jehan
- John Gottowt as Buckliger Narr
- Albert Lind
- Alexander Moissi as King Karl VI.
- Harald Paulsen

== Bibliography ==
- Jacobsen, Wolfgang. Babelsberg: das Filmstudio. Argon, 1994.
- Jung, Uli & Schatzberg, Walter. Beyond Caligari: The Films of Robert Wiene. Berghahn Books, 1999.
