= Hubertus Castle (1934 film) =

1934 film

- Directed by: Hans Deppe
- Written by: Philipp Lothar Mayring; Willy Rath
- Based on: Hubertus Castle by Ludwig Ganghofer
- Produced by: Peter Ostermayr; Alfred Zeisler
- Starring: Friedrich Ulmer; Hansi Knoteck; Arthur Schröder
- Cinematography: Karl Attenberger; Peter Haller
- Edited by: Paul May
- Music by: Franz R. Friedl
- Production companies: Dialog-Film; UFA
- Distributed by: UFA
- Release date: 27 July 1934
- Running time: 85 minutes
- Country: Germany
- Language: German

Hubertus Castle (German: Schloß Hubertus) is a 1934 German drama film directed by Hans Deppe and starring Friedrich Ulmer, Hansi Knoteck and Arthur Schröder. It is an adaptation of the 1895 novel of the same title by Ludwig Ganghofer.

The film's sets were designed by the art director Carl Ludwig Kirmse. Location filming took place in Carinthia in Austria and in Bavaria. It was popular enough to be re-released in 1950.

== Cast ==
- Friedrich Ulmer as Graf Egge
- Hansi Knoteck as Kitty, seine Tochter
- Arthur Schröder as Tassilo, sein Sohn
- Margarete Parbs as Frl. v. Kleesberg
- Hans Schlenck as Werner Forbeck, ein Maler
- Paul Richter as Franz, Jäger
- Hans Adalbert Schlettow as Schipper, Jäger
- Viktor Gehring as Bruckner
- Grete Roman as Anna Herwegh
- Herta Worell as Mali

== See also ==
- Hubertus Castle 1954 film
- Hubertus Castle 1973 film

== Bibliography ==
- Waldman, Harry (2008). Nazi Films in America, 1933–1942. McFarland. ISBN 978-0-7864-3861-7.
