= Crown and Whip =

1919 film

- Directed by: Fern Andra; Georg Bluen
- Written by: Fern Andra
- Produced by: Georg Bluen
- Starring: Fern Andra; Olga Engl; Reinhold Schünzel
- Production company: Fern Andra-Film
- Release date: January 1919
- Country: Germany
- Languages: Silent; German intertitles

Crown and Whip (German: Um Krone und Peitsche) is a 1919 German silent film directed by Fern Andra and Georg Bluen and starring Andra, Olga Engl and Reinhold Schünzel. It premiered at the Marmorhaus in Berlin.

== Cast ==
- Fern Andra
- Olga Engl
- Reinhold Schünzel
- Wilhelm Diegelmann
- Josef Peterhans
- Alice König
- Vera Fischer
- Rudolf Hilberg

== Bibliography ==
- Bock, Hans-Michael & Bergfelder, Tim. The Concise CineGraph. Encyclopedia of German Cinema. Berghahn Books, 2009.
