= Fritz Greiner =

Austrian actor (1879–1933)

- Fritz Greiner in Nathan the Wise (1922)
- Born: 16 September 1879; Vienna, Austria-Hungary
- Died: November 1933 (aged 54); Munich, Germany
- Occupation: Actor
- Years active: 1920-1933

Fritz Greiner (1879–1933) was an Austrian film actor.

== Selected filmography ==
- Der Einäugige (1916)
- Der Klub der Einäugigen (1917) - Nick Carter
- Der schwarze Jack (1918) - Cowboy Schwarzer Jack
- The Hunter of Fall (1918) - Blasi
- Der Herrgott am Wege (1918)
- Der Schattenspieler (1919)
- Sodoms Töchter (1919)
- Storms in May (1919) - Domimi
- Doktor Steffens seltsamster Fall (1919)
- Der Edelweisskönig (1919) - Jörg Finkenbauer
- Das Ende des Abenteurers Paolo de Caspado (1920)
- Panic in the House of Ardon (1920) - Stuart Webbs
- Das ganze Sein ist flammend Leid (1920) - Bankkassier Jürgen
- Der Mann auf der Flasche (1920) - Emir Mohamed Darasche-Koh
- The War of the Oxen (1920) - Richtmann Runotter
- Der Kopf des Gonzalez (1920)
- The Monastery's Hunter (1920) - Wolfrat Polzer
- Der Einäugige (1921) - Der Einäugige
- Der Brand im Varieté Mascotte (1921)
- Der Überfall auf den Europa-Express (1921) - Der Rotbärtige
- Die Wahrsagerin von Paris (1921)
- Die Schreckensnacht im Hause Clarque (1921)
- Der Verfluchte (1921) - Räber
- The Chain of Guilt (1921) - Robert Wit
- The Black Face (1921)
- Oberst Rokschanin (192)
- Nathan the Wise (1922) - Sultan Saladin
- Kauft Mariett-Aktien (1922)
- Im Rausche der Milliarden (1922)
- Zwischen Flammen und Bestien (1923)
- Wo Menschen Frieden finden (1923)
- Lachendes Weinen (1923)
- Dr. Sacrobosco, der große Unheimliche (1923)
- The Woman from the Orient (1923) - Emir Said
- The Emperor's Old Clothes (1923)
- The Way to the Light (1923)
- Das rollende Schicksal (1923)
- To a Woman of Honour (1924)
- Der Löwe von Venedig (1924)
- Two Children (1924) - Niels, Chorist
- The Pearls of Doctor Talmadge (1925)
- Ihre letzte Dummheit (1925)
- Wallenstein (1925, part 1, 2)
- Zigano (1925) - Statthalter Ganossa
- What the Stones Tell (1925) - Andreas Hofer
- Goetz von Berlichingen of the Iron Hand (1925)
- Adventure on the Night Express (1925) - Variété-Direktor
- Die Tragödie zweier Menschen (1925) - Gutsbesitzer Andreas Erler
- The Fallen (1926) - Konrad, Fabrikarbeiter
- Manon Lescaut (1926) - Marquis of Bli
- The Schimeck Family (1926) - Chauffeur
- Circus Romanelli (1926) - Karussellbesitzer
- The Black Pierrot (1926) - Don Gil den Montavan
- The Eleven Schill Officers (1926) - Freiherr von Mallwitz
- Vienna, How it Cries and Laughs (1926) - Leopold Gruber - Haus / Fuhrwerksbesitzer
- Our Emden (1926)
- Circus Beely (1927) - Commissioner Bull
- Klettermaxe (1927)
- His Greatest Bluff (1927) - Hennessy
- I Was a Student at Heidelberg (1927)
- Moral (1928) - Justizrat Hauser
- Doña Juana (1928) - Ramons Freund Osorio
- Luther (1928)
- The Criminal of the Century (1928) - Capitain Tawil
- Robert and Bertram (1928) - the director of the circus
- The Exploits of the Emden (1928)
- Modern Pirates (1928) - Der Unbekannte
- Hungarian Rhapsody (1928) - Gutsverwalter Doczy - ihr Vater
- Number 17 (1928) - Shelldrake
- Hurrah! I Live! (1928)
- Fight of the Tertia (1929) - Schutzmann Holzapfel
- Bright Eyes (1929) - Henri, Oberkellner im Palais de Luxe
- The Love of the Brothers Rott (1929)
- Andreas Hofer (1929) - Andreas Hofer
- My Daughter's Tutor (1930) - Schiffskontrolleur
- Das Donkosakenlied (1930) - Räuberhauptmann
- The Immortal Vagabond (1930)
- Im Kampf mit der Unterwelt (1930) - Watts
- Darling of the Gods (1930)
- Wellen der Leidenschaft (1930) - Kölgis, Schmugglerführer
- Leutnant warst Du einst bei deinen Husaren (1930)
- Road to Rio (1931)
- Tropical Nights (1931) - Schomberg
- Elisabeth of Austria (1931)
- The Squeaker (1931) - Falschspieler
- The Theft of the Mona Lisa (1931)
- A Waltz by Strauss (1931) - Bäckermeister Deisinger
- Die Mutter der Kompagnie (1931) - Herr Professor
- Liebeskommando (1931)
- Viennese Waltz (1932) - the director of the theater
- Once There Was a Waltz (1932) - Fiakerkutscher
- Cruiser Emden (1932) - Mertens
- Strafsache van Geldern (1932)
- The Black Hussar (1932) - Corporal
- Kampf um Blond (1933)
- The Emperor's Waltz (1933)
- S.A.-Mann Brand (1933) - Mr. Baumann
- Happy Days in Aranjuez (1933)
- Ein Unsichtbarer geht durch die Stadt (1933) - Hauswirt von Frau Bergmann
- The Fugitive from Chicago (1933)
- Drei Kaiserjäger (1933) - Nuller (final film role)
