= Harry Hill's Deadly Hunt =

1925 German silent film

- Directed by: Lorenz Bätz; Willy Rath
- Written by: Willy Rath
- Starring: Valy Arnheim
- Cinematography: Josef Dietze; Otto Kanturek
- Production company: Valy Arnheim-Film
- Release date: February 1925
- Country: Germany
- Languages: Silent; German intertitles

Harry Hill's Deadly Hunt (German: Harry Hills Jagd auf den Tod) is a 1925 German silent film directed by Lorenz Bätz and Willy Rath and starring Valy Arnheim as the detective Harry Hill, part of a series featuring the character. It was released in two parts, both premiering in February 1925.

== Cast ==
In alphabetical order

- Valy Arnheim as Harry Hill
- Walter Formes
- Georg John
- Kurt Lilien
- Marga Lindt
- Sybill Morel
- Aruth Wartan

== Bibliography ==
- Freese, Gene Scott (2014). Hollywood Stunt Performers, 1910s–1970s: A Biographical Dictionary. Jefferson, NC: McFarland. ISBN 978-0-7864-7643-5.
