= Prashna's Secret =

1922 film

- Directed by: Ludwig Baetz
- Written by: Friedrich Freksa
- Produced by: Fern Andra; Georg Bluen
- Starring: Hermann Leffler; Fern Andra; Leopold von Ledebur
- Production company: Fern Andra-Film
- Release date: 15 September 1922
- Country: Germany
- Languages: Silent; German intertitles

Prashna's Secret (German: Praschnas Geheimnis) is a 1922 German silent adventure film directed by Ludwig Baetz and starring Hermann Leffler, Fern Andra, and Leopold von Ledebur.

The film's sets were designed by the art director Jacek Rotmil.

== Cast ==
- Hermann Leffler as Prof. Tarnkoff, Gelehrter
- Fern Andra
- Leopold von Ledebur as Dr. van Beuken, ein unheimlicher Mensch
- Alfons Fryland
- Nien Soen Ling as Dr. Song-Hu, his Assistant
- Frida Richard as Frau Dr, Brandstätter, hostess of the sculptor
- Heinrich Peer
- Rudolf Hilberg as friend of the sculptor
- Dora Bergner as Piquetta, his beloved
- Leonhard Haskel as Palm, art dealer
- Georg John as Praschna, Indian Fakir

== Bibliography ==
- Grange, William (2008). Cultural Chronicle of the Weimar Republic. Lanham, MD: Scarecrow Press. ISBN 978-0-8108-5967-8.
