= Taxi at Midnight =

1929 film directed by Harry Piel

- Directed by: Harry Piel
- Written by: Robert Liebmann
- Produced by: Harry Piel
- Starring: Harry Piel; Betty Bird; Philipp Manning; Albert Paulig
- Cinematography: Ewald Daub; Herbert Körner
- Production company: Ariel Film
- Distributed by: Deutsches Lichtspiel-Syndikat
- Release date: 15 March 1929
- Running time: 122 minutes
- Country: Germany
- Languages: Silent; German intertitles

Taxi at Midnight (German: Die Mitternachtstaxe) is a 1929 German silent thriller film directed by Harry Piel and starring Piel, Betty Bird and Philipp Manning. It was shot at the Staaken and Grunewald Studios in Berlin. The film's art direction was by Fritz Maurischat and Max Knaake.

== Synopsis ==
Harry Pattler is a law student who works as a late-night taxi driver in order to pay for his studies. He argues with Professor Olten over how reliable circumstantial evidence can be in court. To prove his point he begins to investigate the background of an ongoing case against a man who faces conviction for murder on purely circumstantial evidence. Harry is able to prove that not only is the man not a murderer, his supposed victim is still alive.

== Cast ==
- Harry Piel as Harry Pattler
- Betty Bird as Lilly
- Philipp Manning as Prof. Dr. Olten
- Albert Paulig as Direktor Cremer
- Hans Sanden as Knackermaxe
- Hermann Böttcher as Kommissar Tenner
- Bruno Ziener as W.S. Pinkus
- Aruth Wartan as Martini
- Maria Asti as Mimi
- Steffie Vida as Bardame
- Jaria Kirsanoff as Bardame
- El' Dura as Bardame
- Eva Schmid-Kayser as Bardame
- Hedy Meyer-Seebohn as Bardame
- Wolfgang von Schwindt as Mann im Smoking
- Georg Schmieter as Mann im Smoking
- Charles Francois as Mann im Smoking
- Henry Bender as Erster Wachtmeister
- Julius Falkenstein as Zweiter Wachtmeister
- Georg John as Dritter Wachtmeister
- Charly Berger as Motorradfahrer

== Bibliography ==
- Prawer, S.S. Between Two Worlds: The Jewish Presence in German and Austrian Film, 1910-1933. Berghahn Books, 2005.
