= The Flight into Death =

1921 film

- Directed by: Bruno Ziener
- Written by: Hans Felix; Curt Littmann
- Starring: Ernst Winar; Gertrude Welcker; Josefine Dora; Ernst Dernburg
- Cinematography: Carl Hoffmann; Heinz Stefan Wilbrand; Gotthardt Wolf
- Production company: Deutsch-Süd-Amerikanische Film
- Distributed by: Deitz & Co.
- Release date: 22 July 1921
- Country: Germany
- Languages: Silent; German intertitles

The Flight into Death (German: Der Flug in den Tod) is a 1921 German silent drama film directed by Bruno Ziener and starring Ernst Winar, Gertrude Welcker and Josefine Dora. It premiered in Berlin on 22 July 1921.

== Cast ==
- Gertrude Welcker
- Ernst Winar
- Josefine Dora
- Ernst Dernburg
- Hans Felix
- Mabel May-Yong

== Bibliography ==
- Grange, William. Cultural Chronicle of the Weimar Republic. Scarecrow Press, 2008.
