= Dangerous Clues =

1924 film directed by Harry Piel

- Directed by: Harry Piel
- Written by: Henrik Galeen; Adolf Lantz
- Starring: Harry Piel; Henrik Galeen; Dary Holm; Fred Immler
- Cinematography: Georg Muschner; Gotthardt Wolf
- Production company: Hepe-Film Company
- Distributed by: Bayerische Film
- Release date: 10 June 1924
- Running time: 112 minutes
- Country: Germany
- Languages: Silent; German intertitles

Dangerous Clues (German: Auf gefährlichen Spuren) is a 1924 German silent crime film directed by Harry Piel and starring Piel, Henrik Galeen and Dary Holm. It was shot at the EFA Studios in Berlin and distributed by the Munich-based Bavaria Film. The film's sets were designed by the art director Kurt Richter. It premiered in Berlin on 10 June 1924.

== Cast ==
- Harry Piel as Harry
- Henrik Galeen as Francis Margreit
- Dary Holm as Dorothy
- Fred Immler as Thomas
- Esther Carena as Gitty
- Jenny Marba as Marianne
- Paul Meffert as Bluntzli
- Gustav Oberg as Der Fürst

== Bibliography ==
- Grange, William. Cultural Chronicle of the Weimar Republic. Scarecrow Press, 2008.
