= Manny Ziener =

German actress (1887–1972)

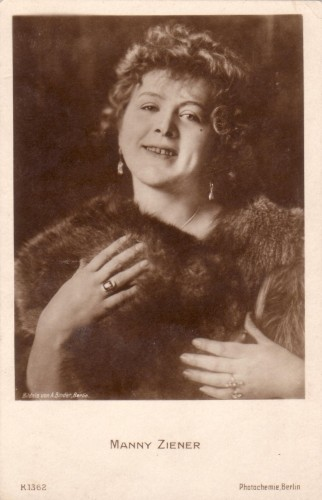
- Manny Ziener c. 1918
- Born: Amanda Margarethe Elise Emma Lemke; 5 October 1887; Berlin, German Empire
- Died: 4 May 1972 (aged 84); West Berlin, West Germany
- Occupations: Stage and film actress
- Years active: 1910–1955
- Spouse: Bruno Ziener

Amanda "Manny" Ziener (born Amanda Margarethe Elise Emma Lemke; 5 October 1887 – 4 May 1972) was a German stage and film actress.

She was born in Berlin and began her career on the stage and appeared in films in the early 1910s before returning to the stage in the 1920s. In the 1930s, Ziener returned to film. She was the wife of actor Bruno Ziener.

== Selected filmography ==
- Richard Wagner (1913)
- Die große Sünderin (1914)
- He This Way, She That Way (1915)
- Miss Venus (1921)
- The Gentleman from Maxim's (1933)
- Der blaue Diamant (1935)
- Uncle Bräsig (1936)
- Maria the Maid (1936)
- Meine Freundin Barbara (1937)
- The Journey to Tilsit (1939)
- Between Hamburg and Haiti (1940)
- The Years Pass (1945)

== Bibliography ==
- Jung, Uli & Schatzberg, Walter. Beyond Caligari: The Films of Robert Wiene. Berghahn Books, 1999.
