= Alone in the Jungle =

1922 film

- Directed by: Ernst Wendt
- Written by: Willy Rath
- Produced by: John Hagenbeck
- Cinematography: Mutz Greenbaum
- Production company: John Hagenbeck-Film
- Release date: 1922
- Country: Germany
- Languages: Silent; German intertitles

Alone in the Jungle (German: Allein im Urwald) is a 1922 German silent film directed by Ernst Wendt. It was re-released in a shorted version under the title of Die Rache der Afrikanerin (Revenge of the African Woman). A copy of the second, shorter version still exists in the German Federal Archives.

The film's sets were designed by Gustav A. Knauer, Friedrich E. Stier and Johann Umlauf.

== Cast ==
- Karl Balta as Fridolin Rist
- Carl de Vogt as Ingenieur Gyldendal
- Lulu Hassan as Manga
- Madge Jackson as Ngumba
- Cläre Lotto as Maria Almquist
- Lothar Mehnert as van Scheven, Gyldendals Freund
- Loni Nest
- Nora Swinburne as Lydia Gyldendal

== Bibliography ==
- Langbehn, Volker, ed. (2010). German Colonialism, Visual Culture, and Modern Memory. New York: Routledge. ISBN 978-1-135-15334-2.
