= People in the Fire =

1930 film directed by Harry Piel

- Directed by: Harry Piel
- Written by: Robert Liebmann; Hans Wilhelm
- Produced by: Harry Piel
- Starring: Harry Piel; Nico Turoff; Lotte Lorring
- Cinematography: Ewald Daub
- Production company: Ariel Film
- Distributed by: Deutsche Lichtspiel-Syndikat
- Release date: 29 January 1930
- Running time: 97 minutes
- Country: Germany
- Languages: Silent; German intertitles

People in the Fire (German: Menschen im Feuer) is a 1930 German silent adventure drama film directed by Harry Piel and starring Piel, Nico Turoff, Lotte Lorring and Hilde von Stolz. It was shot at the Staaken Studios in Berlin. The film's sets were designed by the art director Robert Neppach. Piel was a prominent star of the Weimair era, known for his action films.

== Synopsis ==
Harry Peltzer and his superior Paul Körner are both dedicated firefighters and old friends. Their friendship is put to the test when they both fall for Nelly, a blonde cashier they encounter provoking a deep rivalry between the two. Eventually they come to blows only to be interrupted by the sound of a call-out for a major blaze at a factory. They both head to tackle the massive fire and in the process, together in a collapsing building, their old camaraderie returns. Afterwards they discover that Nelly has been out with another man while they have been tackling the blaze.

== Cast ==
- Harry Piel as Harry Peltzer
- Nico Turoff as Paul Körner
- Lotte Lorring as Nelly
- Hilde von Stolz
- Leopold von Ledebur
- Carl Balhaus
- Ernst Behmer
- Charly Berger
- Kurt Brenkendorf
- Heinrich Gotho
- Frida Richard
- Leo Sloma

== Bibliography ==
- Bleckman, Matias. Harry Piel: Ein Kino-Mythos und seine Zeit. Filminstitut der Landeshaupstadt Düsseldorf, 1993.
- Klaus, Ulrich J. Deutsche Tonfilme: Jahrgang 1929. Klaus-Archiv, 1988.
- Krautz, Alfred International Directory of Cinematographers, Set- and Costume Designers in Film: Germany. Saur, 1984.
