= Panic (1928 film) =

1928 film directed by Harry Piel

- Directed by: Harry Piel
- Written by: Herbert Nossen; Harry Piel
- Starring: Harry Piel; Dary Holm; Eugen Burg; Erich Kaiser-Titz
- Cinematography: Ewald Daub; Gotthardt Wolf
- Production company: Ring Film
- Distributed by: UFA
- Release date: 23 February 1928
- Running time: 109 minutes
- Country: Germany
- Languages: Silent; German intertitles

Panic (German: Panik) is a 1928 German silent crime film directed by Harry Piel and starring Piel, Dary Holm and Eugen Burg. It was shot at the Weissensee Studios in Berlin. The film's sets were designed by the art director Erich Czerwonski. It premiered at the Ufa-Palast am Zoo on 23 February 1928.

== Cast ==
- Harry Piel as Mister X/Rajah von Lahore/Harry Peel
- Dary Holm as Anita
- Eugen Burg
- Erich Kaiser-Titz
- Ernst Behmer
- Henry Bender
- Kurt Brenkendorf
- Jaro Fürth
- Georg John
- Philipp Manning
- Gloria Maro
- Albert Paulig
- Josef Peterhans
- Walter Steinbeck
- Toni Tetzlaff
- Leopold von Ledebur
- Bruno Ziener
- Max Zilzer

== Bibliography ==
- Grange, William. Cultural Chronicle of the Weimar Republic. Scarecrow Press, 2008.
