= The Girl from America =

1925 film

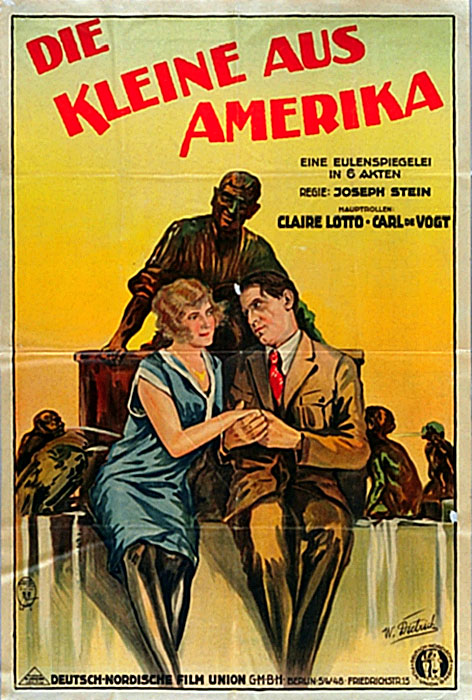
- Directed by: Josef Stein
- Written by: Willy Rath; Ilse Zerbe
- Starring: Carl de Vogt; Hermann Leffler; Cläre Lotto
- Cinematography: Otto Stein
- Production company: Bohème-Film
- Release date: 9 October 1925
- Country: Germany
- Languages: Silent; German intertitles

The Girl from America (German: Die Kleine aus Amerika) is a 1925 American silent romance film directed by Josef Stein and starring Carl de Vogt, Hermann Leffler, and Cläre Lotto.

The film's sets were designed by the art director Fritz Lück.

== Cast ==
- Carl de Vogt as Lutz Gutzewitt / Marquis Saintbrillant
- Cläre Lotto as Rose Parkinson
- Tilly Boettcher as Mrs. Parkinson, Rose's mother
- Hermann Leffler as Anselm Gutzewitt
- Rudolf Lettinger as Bombarth, Faktotum
- Wilhelm Diegelmann as Gefängniswärter
- Erich Roehl as Quickly, Detektiv

== Bibliography ==
- Gerhard Lamprecht. Deutsche Stummfilme, Volume 8.
