= Willy Rath =

German screenwriter

- Born: 21 September 1872; Wiesbaden, German Empire
- Died: 16 January 1940 (aged 67); Berlin, Germany
- Occupation: Writer
- Years active: 1919–1935 (film)

Willy Rath (1872–1940) was a German screenwriter, mainly of the silent era. He was also a successful writer for cabaret.

== Selected filmography ==
- Countess Walewska (1920)
- In Thrall to the Claw (1921)
- The Love Corridor (1921)
- Hannele's Journey to Heaven (1922)
- Don Juan (1922)
- Alone in the Jungle (1922)
- William Tell (1923)
- The Treasure of Gesine Jacobsen (1923)
- Love Is the Power of Women (1924)
- The Radio Marriage (1924)
- Battle of the Butterflies (1924)
- Harry Hill's Deadly Hunt (1925)
- Struggle for the Soil (1925)
- Neptune Bewitched (1925)
- The Girl from America (1925)
- Wrath of the Seas (1926)
- Sword and Shield (1926)
- The Lorelei (1927)
- A Day of Roses in August (1927)
- U-9 Weddigen (1927)
- I Once Had a Beautiful Homeland (1928)
- Hubertus Castle (1934)

== Bibliography ==
- Peter Jelavich. Munich and Theatrical Modernism: Politics, Playwriting, and Performance, 1890-1914. Harvard University Press, 1985.
