= Love Is the Power of Women =

1924 film

- Directed by: Erich Engel; Georg Bluen
- Written by: Willy Rath
- Produced by: Fern Andra; Georg Bluen
- Starring: Fern Andra; Henri Peters-Arnolds; Fred Immler
- Cinematography: Anton Mülleneisen; Ivar Petersen
- Production company: Fern Andra-Film
- Distributed by: Pantomim-Film
- Release date: 17 December 1924
- Running time: 91 minutes
- Country: Germany
- Languages: Silent; German intertitles

Love Is the Power of Women (German: Die Liebe ist der Frauen Macht) is a 1924 German silent drama film directed by Erich Engel and Georg Bluen and starring Fern Andra, Henri Peters-Arnolds, and Fred Immler. The film's sets were designed by the art directors Bernhard Schwidewski and Oscar Friedrich Werndorff.

== Cast ==
- Fern Andra as Fern
- Henri Peters-Arnolds as Ralph, Kunstreiter
- Fred Immler as Orlando, Kunstschütze
- Wolfgang von Schwindt as Albany, Zirkusdirektor
- Martin Wolfgang as Bobby, Clown
- Renée Blue as Renée
- Livio Pavanelli as Mackenzy
- Paul Rehkopf as Bathou
- Paul Günther as Untersuchungsrichter
- Karl Harbacher as Gerichtsschreiber

== Bibliography ==
- Grange, William (2008). Cultural Chronicle of the Weimar Republic. Lanham, MD: Scarecrow Press. ISBN 978-0-8108-5967-8.
