= Bertram Schmiterlöw =

Swedish artist (1920–2002)

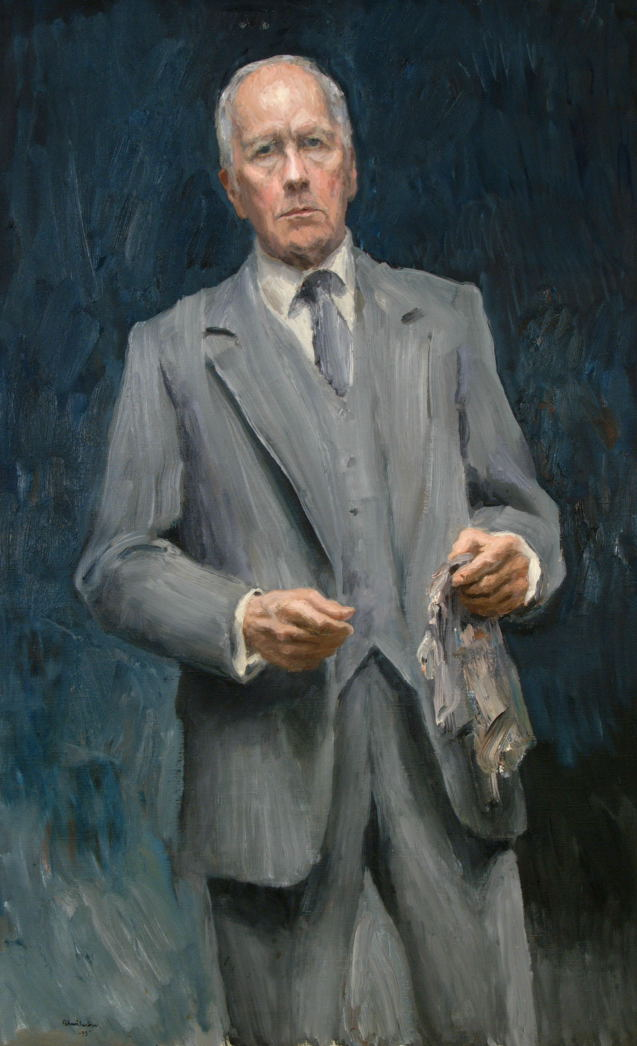
Self portrait, oil on canvas, 2000

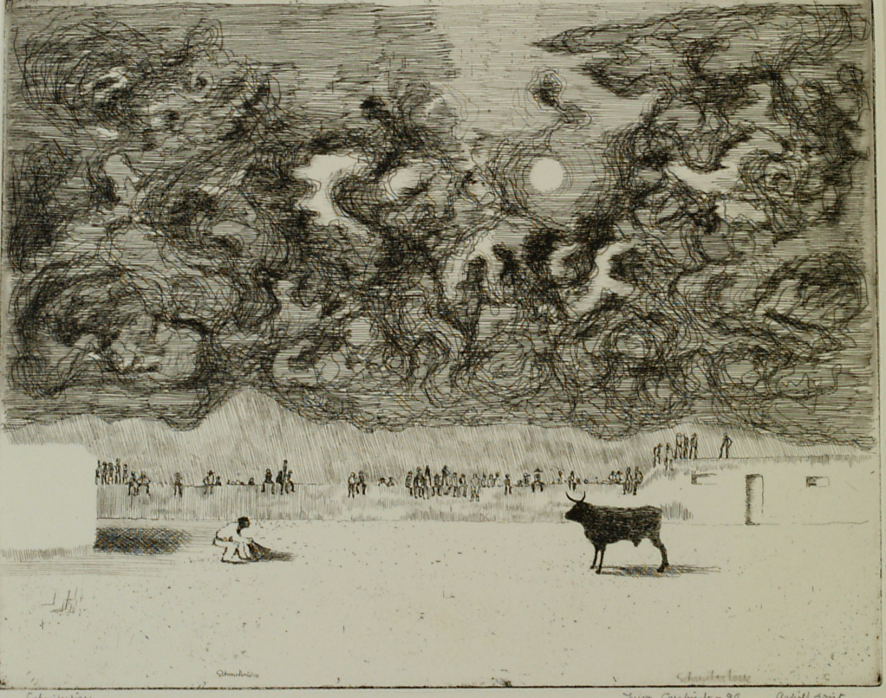
Granada

Bertram Schmiterlöw (20 January 1920, Karlskrona–28 December 2002, Stockholm) was a Swedish painter, printmaker, draughtsman and sculptor. Bertram Schmiterlöw's artistry extends through more than five decades and is characterized by figurative, expressive and colorist works where light and surface jointly create the setting. The themes are often of a desolate, dreamy atmosphere where people are portrayed more as staffage figures rather than as the primary subject matter of the work. His works include human depictions and natural scenes from Sweden and the Mediterranean countries. Schmiterlöw also painted portraits of many important members of the Swedish and Argentine trade, industry and government institutions. In addition he was commissioned to do the portraits of many politicians, royal family members and cultural celebrities in Sweden. Schmiterlow had his artistic training at Otte Skölds art school but left Sweden for Europe and Argentina in his early years. His artistry was inspired by Edward Hopper, Giorgio Morandi and Pedro Figari. He is the halfbrother of actress Vera Schmiterlöw. In 1974 he was decorated with the Royal Order of Vasa and in August 2001 with the Order of the Liberator General San Martín.

== Other ==
- Portrayed in the documentary film "Two Brothers - Two Worlds" by Tom Alandh SVT 2002
- Biography "From my two worlds "by Patrik Reutersvärd and Bertram Schmiterlöw, Karlsson's publishing company, 1999
