= His Best Friend (1929 film) =

1929 film directed by Harry Piel

- Directed by: Harry Piel
- Written by: Hans Rameau
- Starring: Harry Piel; Dary Holm; Grit Haid
- Cinematography: Ewald Daub; Gotthardt Wolf
- Production company: Ariel Film
- Distributed by: Deutsche Lichtspiel-Syndikat
- Release date: 22 October 1929
- Running time: 127 minutes
- Country: Germany
- Languages: Silent; German intertitles

His Best Friend (German: Sein bester Freund) is a 1929 German silent action film directed by and starring Harry Piel and also featuring Dary Holm and Grit Haid. It was shot at the Staaken Studios in Berlin. The film's sets were designed by the art director Robert Neppach.

== Cast ==
In alphabetical order

- Ernst Behmer as Hochzeitsgast
- Charly Berger as Nachtwächter
- Maria Forescu as Hochzeitsgast
- Grit Haid as Nora Sanden
- Dary Holm as Else Kruse
- Philipp Manning as Meyer
- Harry Piel as Harry Peters
- Alexander Sascha as Graf Soderstrom
- Vera Schmiterlöw as Helga Schott
- Grit Sloma as Emil Grigoleit
- Otto Wallburg
- Aruth Wartan as Boris Radowski

== Bibliography ==
- Matias Bleckman. Harry Piel: ein Kino-Mythos und seine Zeit. Filminstitut der Landeshaupstadt Düsseldorf, 1992.
