= The Chain of Guilt =

1921 film

- Directed by: Franz Osten
- Written by: Ernst B. Fey
- Release date: 1921
- Country: Germany
- Languages: Silent; German intertitles

The Chain of Guilt (German:Die Kette der Schuld) is a 1921 German silent film directed by Franz Osten.

== Cast ==
In alphabetical order

- Viktor Gehring as Matthes Sutter, Pelzjäger
- Fritz Greiner as Robert Wit
- Eugen Gura as Bankier Torn
- Violetta Napierska as Ethel Torn
- Henri Peters-Arnolds as Harry

== Bibliography ==
- Sanjit Narwekar. Directory of Indian film-makers and films. Flicks Books, 1994.
