= Hermann Leffler =

German actor (1864–1929)

- Born: 3 October 1864; Quedlinburg, Province of Saxony, Kingdom of Prussia
- Died: 21 November 1929 (aged 65)
- Occupation: Actor
- Years active: 1920–1926

Hermann Leffler (3 October 1864 – 21 November 1929) was a German stage and film actor.

== Selected filmography ==
- The Voice (1920)
- Prashna's Secret (1922)
- The Tower of Silence (1924)
- The Fake Emir (1924)
- Horrido (1924)
- A Dangerous Game (1924)
- The Girl from America (1925)
- The Golden Butterfly (1926)

== Bibliography ==
- Grange, William. Cultural Chronicle of the Weimar Republic. Scarecrow Press, 2008.
