= The Man Without Nerves =

1924 German film

- Directed by: Harry Piel; Gérard Bourgeois
- Written by: Edmund Heuberger; Herbert Nossen
- Produced by: Harry Piel
- Starring: Harry Piel; Dary Holm; Albert Paulig; Marguerite Madys
- Cinematography: Georg Muschner; Gotthardt Wolf
- Production company: Harry Piel for Hape-Film (Berlin)
- Distributed by: Bayern-Film
- Release date: 5 December 1924
- Running time: 108 minutes
- Country: Germany
- Languages: Silent; German intertitles

The Man Without Nerves (German: Der Mann ohne Nerven) is a 1924 German silent crime film directed by Harry Piel, assisted by Gérard Bourgeois and starring Piel, Dary Holm and Albert Paulig. It was shot at the EFA Studios in Berlin. It premiered in Berlin on 5 December 1924.

== Cast ==
- Harry Piel as Der Mann ohne Nerven
- Dary Holm as Aud Egede Christensen
- Albert Paulig as Henry Ricold
- Marguerite Madys as Yvette
- Paul Guidé as Hector Marcel
- Denise Legeay as Lizzie
- José Davert as Jack Brown
- Hermann Picha as Der Notar des Herzogs

== Bibliography ==
- Grange, William. Cultural Chronicle of the Weimar Republic. Scarecrow Press, 2008.
