= The Dancer of Jaipur =

1920 film

- Directed by: Georg Bluen
- Written by: Fern Andra
- Produced by: Georg Bluen
- Starring: Fern Andra; Ernst Rückert; Paul Rehkopf
- Cinematography: Hans Aufhauser
- Production company: Fern Andra-Film
- Release date: 2 December 1920
- Country: Germany
- Languages: Silent; German intertitles

The Dancer of Jaipur (German: Saferndri, die Tänzerin von Dschiapu) is a 1920 German silent film directed by Georg Bluen and starring Fern Andra, Ernst Rückert and Paul Rehkopf.

== Cast ==
- Fern Andra as Schlangentänzerin Saferndri Yelama
- Ernst Rückert as Inder Anguli
- Heinrich Lisson as Gaukler
- Rudolf Hilberg as Fürst von Dschiapur
- Paul Rehkopf
- Sven Holm

== Bibliography ==
- Paolo Caneppele. Entscheidungen der Tiroler Filmzensur 1919-1920-1921: mit einem Index der in Tirol verbotenen Filme 1916–1922. Film Archiv Austria, 2002.
