= José Davert =

French actor

- Born: 6 September 1874; Marseille, Bouches-du-Rhône, France
- Died: April 1934 (aged 59)
- Other name: Joseph Honoré Davert
- Occupation: Actor
- Years active: 1919–1934 (film)

José Davert (1874–1934) was a French film actor.

== Biography ==
Joseph Honoré Davert was born on 6 September 1874 in Marseille, France. He would later move to the United States in 1889 and stay there for 25 years. During this time, he became the owner of a number of cafes and restaurants. When he returned to France he ran into Pierre Antoine who, after hearing about Davert’s situation, went about trying to find him a film role. First they went to Léon Sazie, for whom Antoine was working as a production manager. He thought Davert had a great head and asked if he would lend it to him for a few films. They had come to an agreement by the end of their meeting, but nothing came out of it. Some time later he met up with Antoine once again, who this time introduced him to Pierre Marodon and Gaston Leroux. Marodon asked Davert if he had been on film before, and when he said he hadn’t been, they hired him on the spot. They gave him his debut role of Noël the Canadian in Mascamor (1918).

== Selected filmography ==
- Mascamor (1918)
- La Nouvelle Aurore (1919)
- The House of Mystery (1923)
- The Man Without Nerves (1924)
- Adventure on the Night Express (1925)
- The Phantom of the Moulin Rouge (1925)
- Zigano (1925)
- Swifter Than Death (1925)
- The Secret Courier (1928)
- Figaro (1929)
- Men Without Work (1929)
- Maurin of the Moors (1932)
- Justin de Marseille (1935)

== Bibliography ==
- Goble, Alan. The Complete Index to Literary Sources in Film. Walter de Gruyter, 1999.
