= The Affair of Baroness Orlowska =

1923 film directed by Hans Werckmeister

- Directed by: Hans Werckmeister
- Written by: Hans Land; Hans Werckmeister
- Starring: Willy Kaiser-Heyl; Dary Holm; Viktor Gehring
- Cinematography: Conrad Wienecke
- Production companies: Bukau Film, Leipzig
- Distributed by: Bukau Film
- Release date: 1923
- Country: Germany
- Languages: Silent; German intertitles

The Affair of Baroness Orlowska (German: Die Affäre der Baronesse Orlowska) is a 1923 German silent drama film directed by Hans Werckmeister and starring Willy Kaiser-Heyl, Dary Holm, and Viktor Gehring.

It was approved by German censorship on 7 May 1923, with the ban for young people.

It was described as a not very successful detective film, with action in an unspecified location. The surnames suggest Polish (Orlowska), Czech Praschma, and other origins. The feminine form (ending in '-ska') of the surname of Baron has a comical effect, but Maśnicki notes that Polish surnames had always had problems with correct endings.

== Cast ==
- Willy Kaiser-Heyl as Baron von Orlowska ( [sic])
- Dary Holm as daughter, Marion von Orlowska
- Viktor Gehring as Graf Arsen Praschma
- Bernd Aldor as Stefan Peratoner
- Boris Michailow as Franz, gardener, son of Marion
- Sybill Morel as Stella, dancer
- Rosa Pategg as Marion's nurse
