= The Girl on a Swing (1926 film) =

1926 film

- German: Das Mädel auf der Schaukel
- Directed by: Felix Basch
- Written by: Werner Scheff (novella); Hans Sturm
- Produced by: Herman Millakowsky
- Starring: Ossi Oswalda; Harry Liedtke; Lotte Lorring
- Cinematography: Mutz Greenbaum
- Music by: Werner R. Heymann
- Production company: Greenbaum-Film
- Distributed by: Filmhaus Bruckmann
- Release date: 7 October 1926
- Country: Germany
- Languages: Silent; German intertitles

The Girl on a Swing (German: Das Mädel auf der Schaukel) is a 1926 German silent film directed by Felix Basch and starring Ossi Oswalda, Harry Liedtke, and Lotte Lorring.

The film's art direction was by Julius von Borsody.

== Cast ==
- Ossi Oswalda
- Harry Liedtke
- Lotte Lorring
- Olga Engl
- Harry Bender
- Albert Paulig
- Fritz Steidel
