= The Golden Butterfly =

1926 Austrian-German silent drama film

- French release poster
- Directed by: Michael Curtiz
- Written by: Jane Bess; Adolf Lantz; Story: P.G. Wodehouse
- Produced by: Arnold Pressburger
- Starring: Hermann Leffler; Lili Damita
- Cinematography: Gustav Ucicky; Eduard von Borsody
- Music by: Willy Schmidt-Gentner
- Production companies: Sascha Film; Phoebus Film
- Distributed by: Phoebus Film
- Release date: 30 August 1926 (Germany)
- Running time: 6–7 reels
- Countries: Weimar Republic; Austria; Denmark

The Golden Butterfly (German: Der goldene Schmetterling) is a 1926 Austrian-German silent drama film directed by Michael Curtiz, and starring Hermann Leffler, Lili Damita, and Nils Asther. It was based on the 1915 short story "The Making of Mac's" by British author P. G. Wodehouse. The film was released in the United Kingdom as The Golden Butterfly, in a form shortened to 5 reels, and had a limited release in the US under the title The Road to Happiness.

The film was shot at the Johannisthal Studios in Berlin, and on location in London and Cambridge. The film's sets were designed by the art director Paul Leni. It was made as a co-production between the Austrian Sascha Film and the German Phoebus Film. It was released in Britain by the Stoll Pictures company. It was the last film directed by the Hungarian Michael Curtiz in Germany before he immigrated to the United States.

== Cast ==
- Hermann Leffler as MacFarland
- Lili Damita as Lilian, his foster daughter
- Nils Asther as Andy, his son
- Jack Trevor as Teddy Aberdeen, a wealthy and idle man
- Curt Bois as André Dubois, dancer and choreographer
- Kurt Gerron as the regular diner
- Karl Platen as 'Uncle Bill', the head waiter
- Ferdinand Bonn as the theatre director
- Julius von Szöreghy as the cook

== Bibliography ==
- Von Dassanowsky, Robert (2005). Austrian Cinema: A History. Jefferson, NC: McFarland. ISBN 978-1-4766-2147-0.
