= Adventure on the Night Express =

1925 film directed by Harry Piel

- Directed by: Harry Piel
- Written by: Edmund Heuberger; Harry Piel
- Starring: Harry Piel; Dary Holm; José Davert
- Cinematography: Georg Muschner; Gotthardt Wolf
- Production company: Phoebus Film
- Distributed by: Phoebus Film
- Release date: 25 December 1925
- Running time: 131 minutes
- Country: Germany
- Languages: Silent; German intertitles

Adventure on the Night Express (German: Abenteuer im Nachtexpreß) is a 1925 German silent thriller film directed by Harry Piel and starring Piel, Dary Holm and José Davert. The film's sets were designed by the art directors Fritz Kraenke and Kurt Richter.

== Cast ==
- Harry Piel as Harry Piel
- Dary Holm as Baronesse Myra von Geldern
- José Davert as Charles Theewen
- Lissy Arna as Gräfin Sonja Waranow
- Albert Paulig as Detektiv Fix
- Georg John as Theewens Diener Raoul
- Fritz Greiner as Variété-Direktor

== Bibliography ==
- Grange, William (2008). Cultural Chronicle of the Weimar Republic. Lanham, MD: Scarecrow Press. ISBN 978-0-8108-5967-8.
