= Bruno Ziener =

German actor (1870–1941)

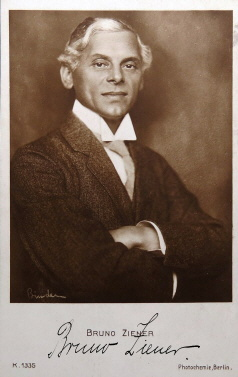
- Ziener c. 1917
- Born: 11 June 1870; Zwickau, Saxony
- Died: 9 February 1941 (aged 70); Berlin, Nazi Germany
- Occupations: Actor; Film director
- Years active: 1891–1941
- Spouse: Manny Ziener

Bruno Ziener (11 June 1870 – 9 February 1941) was a German stage and film actor and director. He appeared in over 100 films between 1913 and 1941. He also directed 28 silent films such as The Flight into Death (1921).

== Selected filmography ==
=== Director ===
- The Beggar Countess (1918)
- Maria (1919)
- The Flight into Death (1921)

=== Actor ===
- Die große Sünderin (1914) - Bankier Hausmann
- Lottekens Feldzug (1915)
- Der Brieföffner (1916) - Mörder
- Im Joche des Schicksals (1916) - Bankier Karl Heidinger
- Professor Erichsons Rivale (1916) - Prof. Dircksen
- Aussage verweigert (1916)
- Die Reise ins Jenseits (1916) - Herzog
- Der Schloßschrecken (1916)
- Der Fakir im Frack (1916) - Der Fakir im Frack
- The Night Talk (1917) - Jan Routt
- Das Nachtgespräch (1917)
- Königliche Bettler (1917)
- Aus vergessenen Akten (1917)
- Ein scharfer Schuss (1917)
- Der Fall Dombronowska...! (1917) - Kunstmaler Rietz
- Der Dieb (1918) - Benno, Freiherr von Lancken
- Das Tagebuch des Apothekers Warren (1918)
- Verworrene Wege (1918)
- Die Glocken der Katharinenkirche (1918)
- Indian Revenge (1920)
- Evening – Night – Morning (1920) - Cheston - Maud's lover
- Die Geheimnisse von New York (1920)
- Der Unheimliche (1922)
- Der falsche Prinz (1922) - Der Sterndeuter des Sultans
- I.N.R.I. (1923) - Simon Petrus
- Wood Love (1925) - Milon - General of the Greeks
- Guillotine (1925)
- The Circus Princess (1925)
- Bismarck (1925)
- The Director General (1925)
- The Bank Crash of Unter den Linden (1926) - Dr. Schumann
- Der Mann aus dem Jenseits (1926) - Lawyer
- State Attorney Jordan (1926) - Vorsitzender
- Bismarck 1862–1898 (1927)
- Out of the Mist (1927) - Jakob Hellmich
- Children's Souls Accuse You (1927) - Josef - Diener
- Ein Tag der Rosen im August... (1927) - Bankpräsident
- The Girl with the Five Zeros (1927) - Müller, Lotteriekollekteur
- The Prince of Rogues (1928) - Der alte Bückler
- Panic (1928)
- The Strange Night of Helga Wangen (1928) - Kaspar
- Eddy Polo in the Wasp's Nest (1928) - Diener bei Clarens
- Taxi at Midnight (1929) - W.S. Pinkus
- The Crimson Circle (1929) - Kriminalkommissar
- A Small Down Payment on Bliss (1929) - Ein alter Roué
- The Woman One Longs For (1929) - Diener
- Inherited Passions (1929)
- Durchs Brandenburger Tor. Solang noch Untern Linden... (1929) - Professor Berghaus
- Dear Homeland (1929)
- Men Without Work (1929) - Dupont
- A Mother's Love (1929)
- Anesthesia (1929) - Arzt
- The Call of the North (1929)
- The Mistress and her Servant (1929) - Baumgartner
- Dangers of the Engagement Period (1930) - Miller
- Police Spy 77 (1930)
- Das Mädel aus U.S.A. (1930) - Petroleumskönig
- Dreyfus (1930) - Alphonse Bertillon
- A Student's Song of Heidelberg (1930)
- 1914 (1931) - Count von Schön
- The Man Who Murdered (1931) - Prospère - Diener bei Sévigné
- M (1931) - (uncredited)
- The Theft of the Mona Lisa (1931)
- Bombs on Monte Carlo (1931) - Jeweler
- The Victor (1932)
- Johnny Steals Europe (1932) - Rittmeister
- The Eleven Schill Officers (1932)
- The Heath Is Green (1932)
- Trenck (1932) - Alvensleben, Minister
- Marschall Vorwärts (1932) - Humboldt
- Ship Without a Harbour (1932)
- The Innocent Country Girl (1933) - Ein Fahrgast
- Manolescu, der Fürst der Diebe (1933)
- The Testament of Dr. Mabuse (1933)
- Heimat am Rhein (1933) - Ein Freund von Andreas
- There Is Only One Love (1933) - Kapellmeister
- Mother and Child (1934) - Diener bei Petersen
- Da stimmt was nicht (1934)
- Ein Kind, ein Hund, ein Vagabund (1934)
- Hearts are Trumps (1934)
- The Red Rider (1935) - Heckeli
- Alles um eine Frau (1935)
- Artisten (1935) - Kommissar Helmer
- Königstiger (1935)
- His Late Excellency (1935) - Bürovorsteher Lampe
- The Call of the Jungle (1936) - Petterson
- Family Parade (1936) - Frederik
- Schlußakkord (1936)
- The Hour of Temptation (1936) - Bürovorsteher Neumann
- Der Kaiser von Kalifornien (1936) - Bankier
- Diener lassen bitten (1936) - Jerome - der Butler
- Escapade (1936)
- Fridericus (1937) - General Zieten
- The Kreutzer Sonata (1937) - Diener Iwan
- The Glass Ball (1937) - Juwelier
- An Enemy of the People (1937) - Bürovorsteher Weber
- Talking About Jacqueline (1937) - William
- Land of Love (1937) - Ein Lakai
- My Son the Minister (1937) - Pierre, Diener
- Diamonds (1937) - Livrierter Diener im Speisesaal
- Fanny Elssler (1937)
- Tango Notturno (1937) - Der Diener bei den Gerards
- Das große Abenteuer (1938)
- The Secret Lie (1938) - Konzertsaaldiener (uncredited)
- The Holm Murder Case (1938) - Notar Bertelsen
- Skandal um den Hahn (1938)
- Red Orchids (1938)
- Dance on the Volcano (1938) - Logenschließer (uncredited)
- The Night of Decision (1938) - Diener bei Brückmann
- Between River and Steppe (1939) - Peter Wagner
- Bel Ami (1939) - Parlamentsdiener
- Water for Canitoga (1939) - Professor Deutsch
- Die Frau ohne Vergangenheit (1939)
- The Journey to Tilsit (1939) - Ober im Cafe
- Passion (1940)
- The Swedish Nightingale (1941)
- The Way to Freedom (1941)) - Kantor des pommerschen Kinderchors
- The Gasman (1941) - Vornehmer alter Herr (final film role)

== Bibliography ==
- Grange, William (2008). Cultural Chronicle of the Weimar Republic. Lanham, MD: Scarecrow Press. ISBN 978-0-8108-5967-8.
