= Hubertus Castle (1954 film) =

1954 film

- Directed by: Helmut Weiss
- Written by: Peter Ostermayr
- Based on: Hubertus Castle by Ludwig Ganghofer
- Produced by: Ottmar Ostermayr; Peter Ostermayr
- Starring: Friedrich Domin; Marianne Koch; Heinz Baumann
- Cinematography: Franz Koch
- Edited by: Adolf Schlyssleder
- Music by: Bernhard Eichhorn
- Production company: Peter Ostermayr Produktion
- Distributed by: Kopp-Filmverleih
- Release date: 24 August 1954
- Running time: 90 minutes
- Country: West Germany
- Language: German

Hubertus Castle (German: Schloß Hubertus) is a 1954 German drama film directed by Helmut Weiss and starring Friedrich Domin, Marianne Koch and Heinz Baumann. It is based on the 1895 novel of the same name by Ludwig Ganghofer. The novel had previously been made into a 1934 film and was later adapted for the screen again in 1973. It was shot at the Bavaria Studios in Munich. The film's sets were designed by Wolf Englert and Carl Ludwig Kirmse.

== Cast ==
- Friedrich Domin as Graf Egge
- Marianne Koch as Geislein
- Heinz Baumann as Tassilo
- Raidar Müller-Elmau as Willy
- Lil Dagover as Baronin Kleesberg
- Michael Heltau as Maler Forbeck
- Paul Richter as Jäger Honegger
- Karl Hanft as Jäger Schipper
- Gustav Waldau as Diener Moser
- Renate Hoy as Anna Herweg
- Erika Remberg as Lieserl
- Walter Janssen as Arzt
- Georg Bauer as Patscheider
- Elisabeth Wischert as Mali
- Heinrich Hauser as Bernlochner

== Bibliography ==
- Goble, Alan (1999). The Complete Index to Literary Sources in Film. Walter de Gruyter. ISBN 978-3-11-095194-3.
