= Vera Schmiterlöw =

Swedish actress

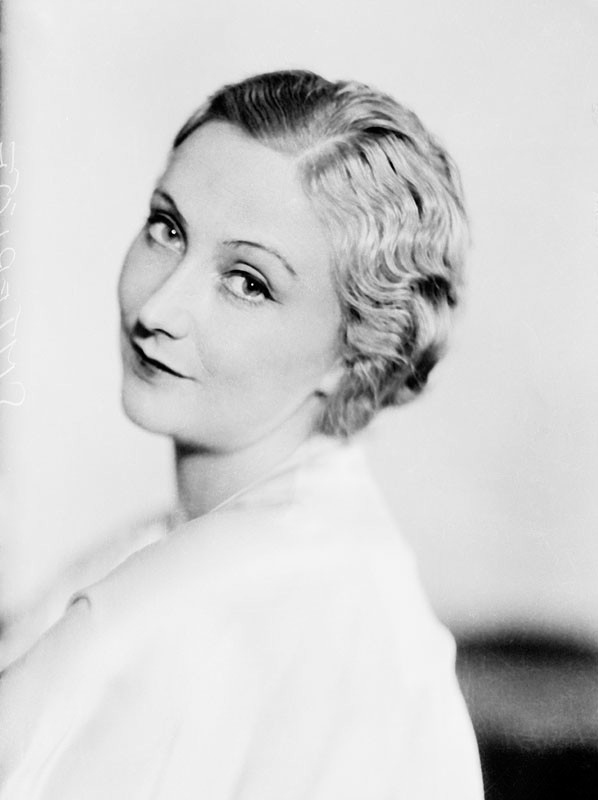
Portrait of Vera Schmiterlow

Alice Vera Cecilia Charlotta Schmiterlöw (19 July 1904, Varberg – 9 September 1987, Stockholm) was a Swedish actress. She studied drama at the Royal Dramatic Theatre from 1921 to 1924, where she met classmates Mimi Pollak and Greta Garbo, with whom she had a lifelong friendship. The intimate correspondence between Schmiterlöw and Garbo is saved in the National Archives of Sweden. From 1927 to 1932 she mainly worked in Germany where she appeared in several films. Vera Schmiterlöw was the half-sister of artist Bertram Schmiterlöw.

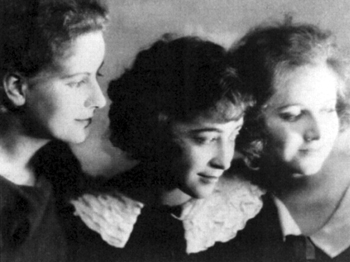
Greta Garbo, Mimi Pollak and Vera Schmiterlöw, students at the Royal Dramatic Training Academy (1922/1923)

== Filmography ==
- 1920: Bodekungen
- 1922: Thomas Graal's Ward
- 1923: Andersson, Pettersson och Lundström
- 1924: När millionerna rullar…
- 1924: 33.333
- 1925: First Mate Karlsson's Sweethearts
- 1926: Mordbrännerskan
- 1926: The Rivals
- 1926: Was ist los im Zirkus Beely?
- 1927: The Queen of Pellagonia
- 1927: The Standard-Bearer of Sedan
- 1927: Their Last Love Affair (Ihr letztes Liebesabenteuer)
- 1927: Eine kleine Freundin braucht jeder Mann
- 1928: Dame Care
- 1928: His Strongest Weapon
- 1928: The Market of Life
- 1928: When the Mother and the Daughter
- 1928: At Ruedesheimer Castle There Is a Lime Tree
- 1928: Mädchenschicksale
- 1929: Bruder Bernhard / Der Eremit
- 1929: When the White Lilacs Bloom Again
- 1929: The Black Domino
- 1929: We Stick Together Through Thick and Thin
- 1929: Hrích
- 1929: The Flight from Love
- 1929: His Best Friend
- 1929: Brother Bernhard
- 1930: Alimente
- 1931: Madame Bluebeard
- 1931: En kvinnas morgondag
- 1934: Unga hjärtan
- 1975: Release the Prisoners to Spring
