= He This Way, She That Way =

1915 film

- Directed by: Robert Wiene
- Produced by: Oskar Messter
- Starring: Max Zilzer; Bogia Horska; Otto Treptow; Manny Ziener
- Production company: Messter Film
- Distributed by: Hansa Film
- Release date: January 1915
- Country: Germany
- Languages: Silent, German intertitles

He This Way, She That Way (German: Er rechts, sie links, lit. 'He right, she left') is a 1915 German silent comedy film directed by Robert Wiene and starring Max Zilzer, Bogia Horska, Otto Treptow and Manny Ziener.

== Plot ==
A doctor and his wife try to resolve their marital problems by having affairs.

== Cast ==
- Max Zilzer – Herr Blümchen
- Manny Ziener – Frau Brandeis
- Bogia Horska – Amanda Karola
- Otto Treptow]– Dr. Brandeis

== Bibliography ==
- Jung, Uli & Schatzberg, Walter. Beyond Caligari: The Films of Robert Wiene. Berghahn Books, 1999.
