= Dary Holm =

German actress

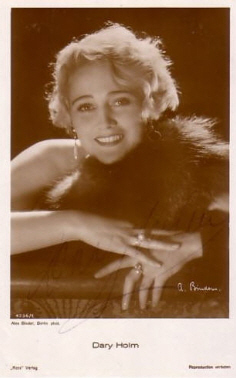
- Born: Anna Maria Dorothea Meyer; 16 April 1897; Hamburg, German Empire
- Died: 29 August 1960 (aged 63); Munich, West Germany
- Occupation: Film actress
- Years active: 1920 - 1932
- Spouse: Harry Piel

Dary Holm (born Anna Maria Dorothea Meyer; 16 April 1897 – 29 August 1960) was a German actress. She married film star Harry Piel in 1927. Holm starred alongside Piel in several films, such as Johnny Steals Europe (1932).

== Selected filmography ==
- In the Ecstasy of Billions (1920)
- Martin Luther (1923)
- The Emperor's Old Clothes (1923)
- The Woman from the Orient (1923)
- The Affair of Baroness Orlovska (1923)
- Hunted Women (1923)
- Dangerous Clues (1924)
- Around a Million (1924)
- The Man Without Nerves (1924)
- The Tragedy of a Night of Passion (1924)
- Zigano (1925)
- Swifter Than Death (1925)
- Adventure on the Night Express (1925)
- Wrath of the Seas (1926)
- The Violet Eater (1926)
- The Black Pierrot (1926)
- Night of Mystery (1927)
- Panic (1928)
- Man Against Man (1928)
- Men Without Work (1929)
- His Best Friend (1929)
- Achtung! – Auto-Diebe! (1930)
- Shadows of the Underworld (1931)
- Johnny Steals Europe (1932)

== Bibliography ==
- Bleckman, Matias. Harry Piel: Ein Kino-Mythos und seine Zeit. Filminstitut der Landeshaupstadt Düsseldorf, 1992.
- Grange, William. Cultural Chronicle of the Weimar Republic. Scarecrow Press, 2008.
