= Viktor Gehring =

German actor

- Born: 10 January 1889
- Died: 24 April 1978 (aged 89)
- Occupation: Actor
- Years active: 1916-1963 (film )

Viktor Gehring (10 January 1889 – 24 April 1978) was a German stage and film actor.

== Selected filmography ==
- The Hunter of Fall (1918)
- The Monastery's Hunter (1920)
- The Chain of Guilt (1921)
- Trutzi from Trutzberg (1922)
- Monna Vanna (1922)
- Martin Luther (1923)
- The Affair of Baroness Orlovska (1923)
- I Lost My Heart in Heidelberg (1926)
- The League of Three (1929)
- The Tiger Murder Case (1930)
- Hubertus Castle (1934)
- Marriage Strike (1935)
- The Monastery's Hunter (1935)
- Militiaman Bruggler (1936)
- Signal in the Night (1937)
- Storms in May (1938)
- The Rainer Case (1942)
- The Cloister of Martins (1951)

== Bibliography ==
- Giesen, Rolf. Nazi Propaganda Films: A History and Filmography. McFarland, 2003.
