= Lotte Lorring =

German actress and singer

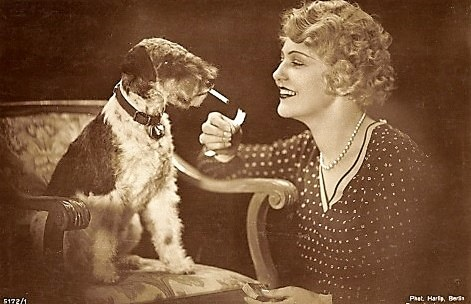
- Born: Erna Else Charlotte Budzinski; 6 December 1893; Berlin, German Empire
- Died: 20 March 1939 (aged 45); Berlin, Germany
- Occupation: Actress
- Years active: 1920–1935 (film)

Lotte Lorring (born Erna Else Charlotte Budzinski; 6 December 1893 – 20 March 1939) was a German stage and film actress and operetta singer.

== Death ==
Lorring died on 20 March 1939, aged 45, in Berlin, Germany.

== Filmography ==
- Um der Liebe Willen (1920)
- Er bleibt in der Familie (1920)
- Der Verfluchte (1921)
- The Hurricane on the Mountain (1922)
- Die Dame in Grau (1922)
- Accommodations for Marriage (1926)
- Department Store Princess (1926)
- The Girl on a Swing (1926)
- Unmarried Daughters (1926)
- The Grey House (1926)
- The Uncle from the Provinces (1926)
- The Lorelei (1927)
- Ehekonflikte (1927)
- Todessturz im Zirkus Cesarelli (1927)
- Queen Louise (1927)
- His Greatest Bluff (1927)
- When the Young Wine Blossoms (1927)
- A Modern Dubarry (1927)
- Miss Chauffeur (1928)
- Charlotte Somewhat Crazy (1928)
- Dyckerpotts' Heirs (1928)
- Milak, the Greenland Hunter (1928)
- The Women's War (1928)
- The Happy Vagabonds (1929)
- The Black Domino (1929)
- Wem gehört meine Frau? (1929)
- The Convict from Istanbul (1929)
- People in the Fire (1930)
- The Tender Relatives (1930)
- Karriere (1930)
- Dangers of the Engagement Period (1930)
- Das Erlebnis einer Nacht (1930)
- Wiener Liebschaften (1931)
- Ich heirate meinen Mann (1931)
- Seine Freundin Annette (1931)
- The Concert (1931)
- Hooray, It's a Boy! (1931)
- I Do Not Want to Know Who You Are (1932)
- The Emperor's Waltz (1933)
- Ways to a Good Marriage (1933)
- Johannisnacht (1933)
- The Black Forest Girl (1933)
- Ich sing' mich in dein Herz hinein (1934)
- Light Cavalry (1935)

== Bibliography ==
- Chandler, Charlotte. Marlene: Marlene Dietrich, A Personal Biography. Simon and Schuster, 2011.
