= Their Last Love Affair =

1927 German silent film

- Directed by: Max Reichmann
- Written by: Curt J. Braun; Max Reichmann
- Produced by: Arthur Ziehm
- Starring: Gustav Fröhlich; Vera Schmiterlöw; Carmen Boni
- Cinematography: Edgar S. Ziesemer
- Music by: Hans May
- Production company: Arthur Ziehm
- Release date: 11 August 1927
- Country: Germany
- Languages: Silent; German intertitles

Their Last Love Affair (German: Ihr letztes Liebesabenteuer) is a 1927 German silent film directed by Max Reichmann and starring Gustav Fröhlich, Vera Schmiterlöw and Carmen Boni. In the United Kingdom it was released under the alternative title of Always Tell Auntie.

== Cast ==
- Gustav Fröhlich as Marys Mann
- Vera Schmiterlöw as Mary
- Carmen Boni as Marys Tante
- Hugo Döblin
- Robert Leffler
- Henri De Vries
- Ellen Douglas
- Max Nosseck
- Paul Seelig
- Ernst Dernburg

== Bibliography ==
- Bock, Hans-Michael & Bergfelder, Tim. The Concise CineGraph. Encyclopedia of German Cinema. Berghahn Books, 2009.
