= Fern Andra =

American actress and director (1893–1974)

Baroness Fern Andra von Weichs
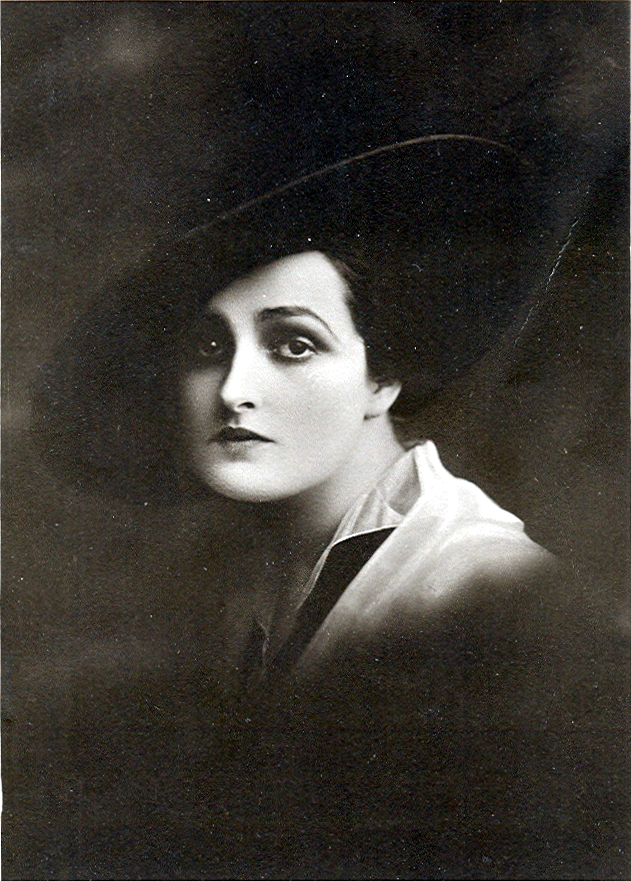
- Born: Vernal Edna Andrews; November 24, 1893; Watseka, Illinois, U.S.
- Died: February 8, 1974 (aged 80); Aiken, South Carolina, U.S.
- Occupations: Actress, writer, film director/producer
- Years active: 1913–1930
- Spouses: Baron Friedrich von Weichs (died 1917) Kurt Prenzel (m. 1924, divorced) Ian Keith (m. 1932; div. 1934) General Samuel Edge Dockrell (m. 1938; died 1973)

Fern Andra, Dowager Baroness von Weichs (born Vernal Edna Andrews, November 24, 1893 – February 8, 1974) was an American actress, film director, script writer, and producer. Next to Henny Porten and Asta Nielsen, she was one of the most popular and well-known actresses in German silent film.

== Biography ==
Vernal Edna Andrews was born in Watseka, Illinois, on November 24, 1893, the daughter of William P. Andrews and Sarah Emily Evett, also known as Sadie. Vernal was of English and Scottish descent on her father's side, while she was of English and German on her mother's.

When William died in 1898, Sadie remarried Frank St. Clair, a vaudeville actor, circus performer and tight-rope walker. Andra was already appearing in public in a tightrope act by the age of four. She later trained in song and dance. As early as 1899, in New York, she made her first film, a version of Uncle Tom's Cabin.

However, she remained with the circus, with which she embarked on an extensive tour across the United States, Canada and Europe. For a time, she was a member of Bird Millman's acclaimed troupe of wire artists. In Berlin she met Max Reinhardt, who gave her acting lessons. In 1913, aged 19, she appeared in her first German film, Das Ave Maria. Still only moderately well known, she made her only Austrian film in 1915: Zwei Freunde. From 1916 to 1918 she appeared almost exclusively on camera with Alfred Abel. In 1920 she starred in Robert Wiene's expressionist horror film Genuine. In the mid-1920s she lost her public appeal in Germany.

Andra became a producer in Germany with Georg Glen as manager. The company produced more than 80 films during World War I. That effort ended after Nazis took control in the country.

On July 4, 1922, she was involved in the Hamburg-Berlin mail plane accident. The pilot, Lothar von Richthofen, younger brother of World War I flying ace Manfred von Richthofen (the "Red Baron"), was killed. Andra was initially misreported as dead, but survived. Her companion, director Georg Bluen, also survived and continued working with her until 1925.

Andra's activities on stage included acting at the Hollywood Playhouse in the 1930s. She also founded the Windsor Theater in Los Angeles. Her final stage appearance came in 1936.

From 1928 she worked in the UK and the US, later expanding her range to include radio and television.

== Marriages ==
Fern Andra was married four times; all of the unions were childless:

- Baron Friedrich von und zu Weichs-Zur-Wenne (died in 1917)
- Ian Keith (February 15, 1934 – May 18, 1935, divorce)
- Gen. Samuel Edge Dockrell (1938–1973; his death)

== Death ==
Fern Andra died in Aiken, South Carolina, on February 8, 1974, aged 80.

== Selected filmography ==
- Spring Storms (1918)
- Crown and Whip (1919)
- Genuine (1920)
- Madame Récamier (1920)
- The Night of Queen Isabeau (1920)
- The Dancer of Jaipur (1920)
- Waves of Life and Love (1921)
- Driving Force (1921)
- Prashna's Secret (1922)
- The Red Rider (1923)
- Love Is the Power of Women (1924)
- Za La Mort (1924)
- Women of Passion (1926)
- Radio Magic (1927)
- Spangles (1928)
- The Warning (1928)
- The Burgomaster of Stilemonde (1929)
- The Eyes of the World (1930)
- Lotus Lady (1930)
