= Hubertus Castle (novel) =

1895 novel by Ludwig Ganghofer

- Author: Ludwig Ganghofer
- Language: German
- Genre: Drama
- Publication date: 1895
- Publication place: Germany
- Media type: Print

Hubertus Castle (German: Schloß Hubertus) is an 1895 novel by the German writer Ludwig Ganghofer.

== Adaptations ==
It has been adapted for the screen three times:

- Hubertus Castle (1934) directed by Hans Deppe
- Hubertus Castle (1954) directed by Helmut Weiss
- Hubertus Castle (1973) directed by Harald Reinl

== Bibliography ==
- Goble, Alan. The Complete Index to Literary Sources in Film. Walter de Gruyter, 1999.
