= Georg Muschner =

German cinematographer

- Born: 12 June 1885; Langenbielau, Lower Silesia; German Empire
- Died: 17 May 1971 (aged 85); West Berlin, West Germany
- Occupation: Cinematographer
- Years active: 1920–1939

Georg Muschner (12 June 1885 – 17 May 1971) was a German cinematographer. He worked on over sixty productions during his career in the Weimar Republic, Austria, and Nazi Germany. Muschner originally worked as a portrait photographer, before entering the film industry during the silent era. He worked on several Harry Piel films, including His Greatest Bluff. During the 1930s he often worked with the director Johann Alexander Hübler-Kahla.

== Selected filmography ==
- The Flying Car (1920)
- The Lost House (1922)
- Rivals (1923)
- Judith (1923)
- The Last Battle (1923)
- Women's Morals (1923)
- Dangerous Clues (1924)
- The Fake Emir (1924)
- By Order of Pompadour (1924)
- The Man Without Nerves (1924)
- A Dangerous Game (1924)
- Zigano (1925)
- Adventure on the Night Express (1925)
- The Dealer from Amsterdam (1925)
- Swifter Than Death (1925)
- Eyes Open, Harry! (1926)
- The Black Pierrot (1926)
- His Greatest Bluff (1927)
- Night of Mystery (1927)
- The Girl Without a Homeland (1927)
- What a Woman Dreams of in Springtime (1929)
- Flachsmann the Educator (1930)
- Rag Ball (1930)
- The Citadel of Warsaw (1930)
- Pension Schöller (1930)
- Such a Greyhound (1931)
- Errant Husbands (1931)
- The Battle of Bademunde (1931)
- Mrs. Lehmann's Daughters (1932)
- Our Emperor (1933)
- Dance Music (1935)
- Blood Brothers (1935)
- Across the Desert (1936)
- The Violet of Potsdamer Platz (1936)
- The Mysterious Mister X (1936)
- Meiseken (1937)

== Bibliography ==
- Chandler, Charlotte. Marlene: Marlene Dietrich, A Personal Biography. Simon and Schuster, 2011.
