= Night of Mystery (1927 film) =

1927 film directed by Harry Piel

- Directed by: Harry Piel
- Written by: Edmund Heuberger; Hans Paulsen; Harry Piel
- Produced by: Seymour Nebenzal
- Starring: Harry Piel; Dary Holm; Josef Peterhans
- Cinematography: Georg Muschner; Gotthardt Wolf
- Production company: Nero Film
- Distributed by: Bavaria Film
- Release date: 13 October 1927
- Country: Germany
- Languages: Silent; German intertitles

Night of Mystery (German: Rätsel einer Nacht) is a 1927 German silent thriller film directed by Harry Piel and starring Piel, Dary Holm, and Josef Peterhans. It was shot at the Staaken Studios in Berlin. The film's sets were designed by the art director Willi Herrmann.

== Cast ==
- Harry Piel as Herry Debus, ein Sportsmann
- Dary Holm as Komtesse Elga Almen
- Josef Peterhans as Graf Egar von Almen
- Walter Steinbeck as Prof. Bieler, Leiter einer Nervenanstalt
- Julius Falkenstein as Bodo Donnersheim
- Charly Berger as Der Schatten
- Hugo Fischer-Köppe
- Alfred Loretto
- Ilse Herzberg
- Hans Heinrich von Twardowski
- Hugo Döblin
- Lotte Fritsch
- Friedrich Berger
- Marianne Stanior
- Eva Schmid-Kayser
- Boris Michailow

== Bibliography ==
- Hans-Michael Bock and Tim Bergfelder. The Concise Cinegraph: An Encyclopedia of German Cinema. Berghahn Books, 2009.
