= Gotthardt Wolf =

German cinematographer

- Born: 22 June 1887; Eppendorf, German Empire
- Died: 20 January 1947 (aged 59); Potsdam, Soviet occupation zone in Germany
- Occupation: Cinematographer
- Years active: 1913 - 1936

Gotthardt Wolf (1887–1947) was a German cinematographer who worked on nearly fifty films, mostly during the silent era. He worked on a number of films with Harry Piel the star of comedy-thrillers such as His Greatest Bluff (1927).

== Selected filmography ==
- Miss Piccolo (1914)
- Judith Trachtenberg (1920)
- The Lord of the Beasts (1920)
- The House on the Moon (1921)
- The Flight into Death (1921)
- City in View (1923)
- Dangerous Clues (1924)
- The Man Without Nerves (1924)
- A Dangerous Game (1924)
- The Fake Emir (1924)
- Adventure on the Night Express (1925)
- Zigano (1925)
- Swifter Than Death (1925)
- Eyes Open, Harry! (1926)
- The Black Pierrot (1926)
- Night of Mystery (1927)
- His Greatest Bluff (1927)
- His Strongest Weapon (1928)
- Man Against Man (1928)
- Panic (1928)
- Men Without Work (1929)
- The Hero of Every Girl's Dream (1929)
- The Merry Widower (1929)
- His Best Friend (1929)
- The Big Attraction (1931)
- A Daughter of Her People (1933)

== Bibliography ==
- Bach, Steven. Marlene Dietrich: Life and Legend. University of Minnesota Press, 2011.
- Bock, Hans-Michael & Bergfelder, Tim. The Concise CineGraph. Encyclopedia of German Cinema. Berghahn Books, 2009.
