= Max Zilzer =

German actor (1868–1943)

Max Zilzer (23 November 1868 – 1943) was a Hungarian-born German stage and film actor.

Born in Budapest, Zilzer was Jewish and died in Berlin under interrogation by the Gestapo during World War II. He was the father of actor Wolfgang Zilzer.

== Selected filmography ==
- He This Way, She That Way (1915)
- The Secret of the American Docks (1919)
- The Eyes of the World (1920)
- The Bull of Olivera (1921)
- Debit and Credit (1924)
- Cock of the Roost (1925)
- Luther (1928)
- Panic (1928)
- Girl in the Moon (1929)
- A Student's Song of Heidelberg (1930)
- Raid in St. Pauli (1932)

== Bibliography ==
- Jung, Uli & Schatzberg, Walter. Beyond Caligari: The Films of Robert Wiene. Berghahn Books, 1999.
