= When the Young Wine Blossoms (1927 film) =

1927 film directed by Carl Wilhelm

- Directed by: Carl Wilhelm
- Written by: Bjørnstjerne Bjørnson (play); Max Jungk; Carl Wilhelm
- Produced by: Hanns Lippmann
- Starring: Robert Scholz; Egon von Jordan; Lotte Lorring
- Cinematography: Gustave Preiss; Paul Rischke
- Music by: Pasquale Perris
- Production company: Gloria Film
- Distributed by: Filmhaus Bruckmann
- Release date: 28 January 1927
- Country: Germany
- Languages: Silent; German intertitles

When the Young Wine Blossoms (German: Wenn der junge Wein blüht) is a 1927 German silent comedy film directed by Carl Wilhelm and starring Robert Scholz, Egon von Jordan and Lotte Lorring. It was based on a play by the Norwegian writer Bjørnstjerne Bjørnson. It was subsequently remade as a sound film of the same title in 1943.

The film's sets were designed by the art director Artur Günther.

== Cast ==
- Robert Scholz as Mirko Graf Petrowitsch
- Egon von Jordan as Graf Tino
- Lotte Lorring as Komtesse Milena
- Olga Engl as Milenas Tante
- Sig Arno as Dr. Krolenko, Advokat
- Hanni Weisse as Natascha Kaminskaja, Tänzerin
- Lissy Arna
- Oreste Bilancia as Sekretär Jan Krawatschky
- Adolphe Engers as Toto von Giri
- Carl Geppert as Justizminister Marko Danulesku

== Bibliography ==
- Grange, William. Cultural Chronicle of the Weimar Republic. Scarecrow Press, 2008.
