= Albert Paulig =

German actor

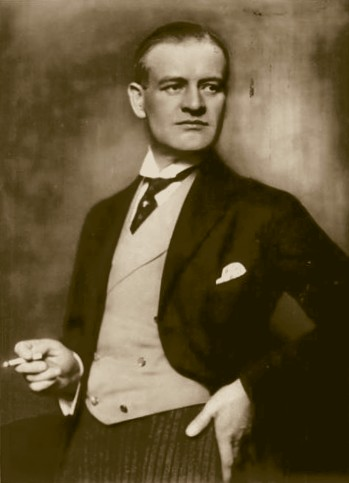
- Born: 14 January 1873; Stollberg, German Empire
- Died: 19 March 1933 (aged 60); Berlin, Nazi Germany
- Occupation: Film actor
- Years active: 1914–1933

Albert Paulig (14 January 1873 – 19 March 1933) was a German film actor who was popular during the silent era. Paulig made his first film in 1914. The following year he appeared in one of Ernst Lubitsch's first directorial attempts, A Trip on the Ice (1915). Paulig was in a number of Harry Piel, thrillers including The Man Without Nerves (1924).

== Selected filmography ==
- The Firm Gets Married (1914)
- The Platonic Marriage (1919)
- The Maharaja's Favourite Wife (1921)
- Love at the Wheel (1921)
- The Adventuress of Monte Carlo (1921)
- The Bull of Olivera (1921)
- Peter Voss, Thief of Millions (1921)
- The Lost House (1922)
- The Flight into Marriage (1922)
- Only One Night (1922)
- Miss Rockefeller Is Filming (1922)
- Rivals (1923)
- The Weather Station (1923)
- Man Against Man (1924)
- The Man Without Nerves (1924)
- The Brigantine of New York (1924)
- The Creature (1924)
- Zigano (1925)
- The Dice Game of Life (1925)
- Adventure on the Night Express (1925)
- Love's Finale (1925)
- Swifter Than Death (1925)
- Cab No. 13 (1926)
- The Third Squadron (1926)
- Trude (1926)
- Her Husband's Wife (1926)
- Chaste Susanne (1926)
- The Young Man from the Ragtrade (1926)
- Should We Be Silent? (1926)
- Hunted People (1926)
- The Prince and the Dancer (1926)
- The Bank Crash of Unter den Linden (1926)
- The Girl on a Swing (1926)
- The Black Pierrot (1926)
- Women of Passion (1926)
- Her Highness Dances the Waltz (1926)
- People to Each Other (1926)
- The Son of Hannibal (1926)
- The Blue Danube (1926)
- The Glass Boat (1927)
- A Modern Dubarry (1927)
- A Serious Case (1927)
- The Dashing Archduke (1927)
- Klettermaxe (1927)
- The Imaginary Baron (1927)
- Break-in (1927)
- Dancing Vienna (1927)
- Vacation from Marriage (1927)
- Schweik in Civilian Life (1927)
- How Do I Marry the Boss? (1927)
- The Prince of Pappenheim (1927)
- His Late Excellency (1927)
- His Greatest Bluff (1927)
- Heads Up, Charley (1927)
- Because I Love You (1928)
- Panic (1928)
- The Lady in Black (1928)
- Tales from the Vienna Woods (1928)
- Master and Mistress (1928)
- The Blue Mouse (1928)
- Immorality (1928)
- Eve's Daughters (1928)
- Left of the Isar, Right of the Spree (1929)
- Men Without Work (1929)
- Lady in the Spa (1929)
- The Model from Montparnasse (1929)
- My Daughter's Tutor (1929)
- Taxi at Midnight (1929)
- Revolt in the Batchelor's House (1929)
- Come Back, All Is Forgiven (1929)
- From a Bachelor's Diary (1929)
- The Fourth from the Right (1929)
- A Student's Song of Heidelberg (1930)
- Susanne Cleans Up (1930)
- Mischievous Miss (1930)
- Frida's Songs (1930)
- Next, Please! (1930)
- A Gentleman for Hire (1930)
- The Caviar Princess (1930)
- The Love Market (1930)
- Peace of Mind (1931)
- Die Bräutigamswitwe (1931)
- The Office Manager (1931)
- A Crafty Youth (1931)
- Headfirst into Happiness (1931)
- Terror of the Garrison (1931)
- The Unfaithful Eckehart (1931)
- Queen of the Night (1931)
- The Prince of Arcadia (1932)
- The Testament of Cornelius Gulden (1932)
- Once There Was a Waltz (1932)
- The Ladies Diplomat (1932)
- At Your Orders, Sergeant (1932)
- Two Good Comrades (1933)

== Bibliography ==
- Eyman, Scott. Ernst Lubitsch: Laughter in Paradise. Johns Hopkins University Press, 2000.
- Grange, William. Cultural Chronicle of the Weimar Republic. Scarecrow Press, 2008.
