= Man Against Man (1928 film) =

1928 film directed by Harry Piel

- Directed by: Harry Piel
- Written by: Robert Liebmann; Herbert Nossen
- Starring: Harry Piel; Dary Holm; Fritz Beckmann; Hertha von Walther
- Cinematography: Ewald Daub; Gotthardt Wolf
- Production company: Ring Film
- Distributed by: UFA
- Release date: 14 May 1928
- Country: Germany
- Languages: Silent; German intertitles

Man Against Man (German: Mann gegen Mann) is a 1928 German silent thriller film directed by Harry Piel and starring Piel, Dary Holm and Fritz Beckmann.

== Cast ==
- Harry Piel as Harry Paulsen
- Dary Holm as Miß Gladys Norton
- Fritz Beckmann as Bartholomeo, Wirt der Schmugglerschenke
- Hertha von Walther as Emita
- Philipp Manning as Fuessli
- Eugen Burg as Berner
- Georg John as Zamok
- Charly Berger as Porter
- Charles Francois as Kanzow

== Bibliography ==
- Kreimeier, Klaus. The Ufa Story: A History of Germany's Greatest Film Company, 1918-1945. University of California Press, 1999.
