= Karl Emil Franzos =

Austrian writer (1848–1904)

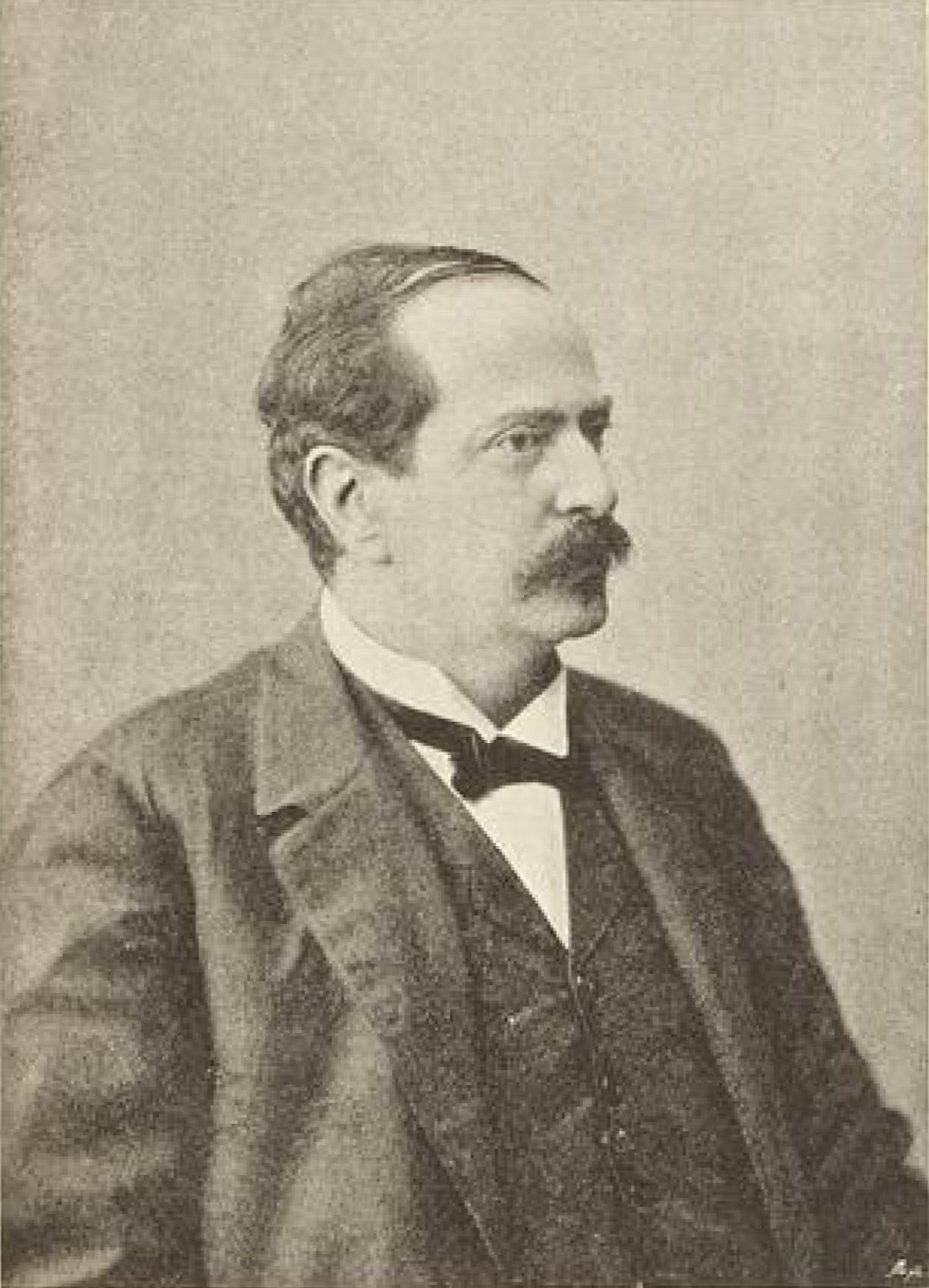
- Franzos in 1891
- Born: 25 October 1848; Czortków (Chortkiv), Galicia, Austrian Empire
- Died: 28 January 1904 (aged 55); Berlin, German Empire
- Occupations: Writer, journalist
- Spouse: Ottilie Benedikt

Karl Emil Franzos (25 October 1848 – 28 January 1904) was a popular Austrian novelist of the late 19th century. His works, both reportage and fiction, concentrate on the multi-ethnic corner of Galicia, Podolia and Bukovina, now largely in western Ukraine, where the Habsburg and Russian empires met. This area became so closely associated with his name that one critic called it "Franzos country". A number of his books were translated into English, and Gladstone is said to have been among his admirers.

== Life ==
Karl Emil Franzos was born near the town of Czortków (Chortkiv) in the eastern, Podolian region of the Austrian Kingdom of Galicia. His family came from Sephardi Spanish Jews who fled the Inquisition to Holland and later settled in Lorraine. In the 1770s his great-grandfather established a factory for one of his sons in East Galicia, part of the Habsburg monarchy since the First Partition of Poland in 1772. When the Austrian administration required Jews to adopt surnames, "Franzos" became his grandfather's name, from his French background, even though he regarded himself as German.

Franzos's father Heinrich (1808–1858) was a highly respected doctor in Czortków. His German identity at the time had mainly linguistic and cultural meaning, there being no state called "Germany", just a loose German Confederation. He was steeped in the humanistic ideals of the German Enlightenment as expressed by Kant, Lessing and, especially, Schiller. This brought a certain isolation: for local Poles and Ukrainians he was German, for Germans a Jew and for Jews a renegade, a deutsch. In the Vormärz era of the first half of the 19th century, liberalism and nationalism went hand in hand, and Franzos's father was one of the first Jews to join a Burschenschaft student fraternity whose ideal was a German nation state with a liberal constitution. It is ironic that by the time Franzos, who shared his father's ideals, went to university, the German student fraternities had "dejudaised" themselves.

His father died when he was ten and his mother moved to the Bukovina capital Czernowitz (Chernivtsi). The city's multiculturalism, representative of the Habsburg Empire, strongly influenced his youth and character. The first languages he spoke were Ukrainian and Polish, learnt from his nurse; his first school was attached to the Czortków Dominican abbey, where the teaching was in Latin and Polish; and he attended private lessons in Hebrew. In Czernowitz he attended the German gymnasium, passing the Matura exam with honours in 1867. By now the family was in reduced circumstances and he supported himself by giving lessons, later, as a student, from his writing. During his time in Bukovina, he developed a deep appreciation for the Romanian people and their culture, becoming a constant supporter of it in the German-speaking world.

He would have liked to study classical philology with the aim of becoming a teacher, but no scholarship was forthcoming. Jews were not eligible for teaching posts, and even though he was non-religious, he refused to convert to advance his career. An additional reason for the refusal of a scholarship was that he did not attempt to conceal his liberal outlook, having, for example, tried to organise a celebration for the liberal poet, Ferdinand Freiligrath. He studied law at the universities of Vienna and Graz, that being a shorter course. When he graduated, he found himself in a similar situation: he did not want to become an advocate, and a position as judge was closed to him as a Jew.

Having had a number of pieces published while he was a student, he went into journalism and worked for newspapers and magazines for the rest of his life, at first in Budapest and in Vienna as a travel writer of the Neue Freie Presse newspaper. In 1877 he married Ottilie Benedikt, a relative of editor Moriz Benedikt. From 1886 he lived in Berlin, capital of the German Empire. Franzos had acclaimed the 1871 German unification under Prussian leadership and advocated a Greater Germany including the Austrian territories. However, the move to the German capital was caused as much by the greater opportunities for publishing there as by his "Germanic" tendencies. Indeed, the increasing virulence of antisemitism in Germany meant that later on he had difficulty placing pieces which were felt to be too pro-Jewish—which was often another way of saying "not sufficiently anti-Jewish".

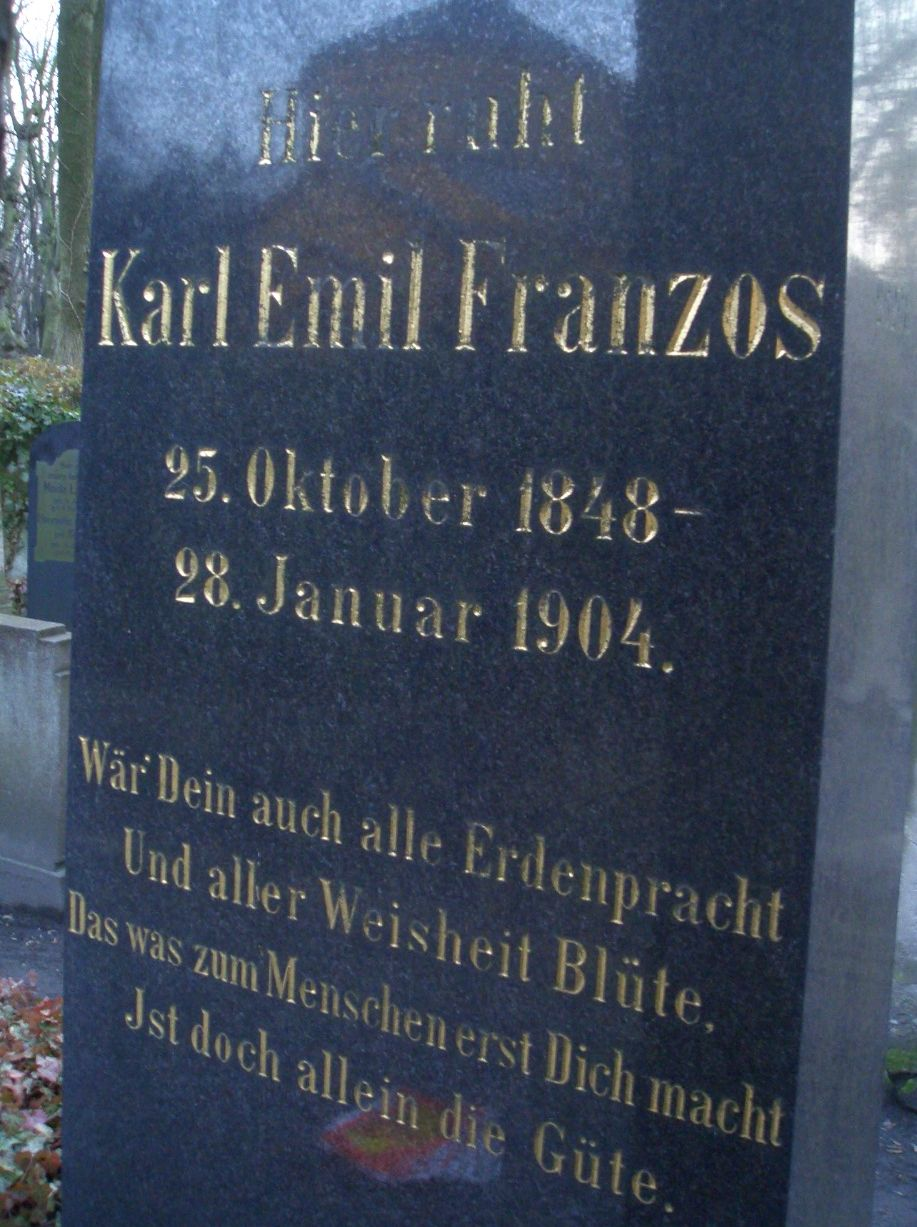
Ehrengrab in Weißensee Cemetery

More and more under Jew-hatred attacks, Franzos suffering from heart trouble died at the age of 55 in Berlin, where he is buried in the Weißensee Cemetery.

== Work ==
Franzos showed the attitudes of the 19th-century assimilated Jew in their best light. His conviction that Germanisation was the way forward was based on the idealistic strain in German culture and will have looked very different in his day to a post-Holocaust perspective. He believed, following the example of Friedrich Schiller, that literature should have an ethical purpose, but he managed to express that purpose through a range of vivid characters who still have the power to move the modern reader.

Galicia and Bukovina were the most backward, the poorest provinces of the Austrian Empire, so that Franzos saw his promotion of Germanisation as part of an attempt to improve conditions there politically and economically as well as culturally and socially. Jews made up some 12% of the population, the largest proportion of any province; two-thirds of the Empire's Jews lived in Galicia. Besides being mostly poor, the shtetl Jews were strict, conservative Hasidim, shutting themselves off as far as possible from their Christian neighbours, who responded in kind. Poor orthodox Jews from the east were a not uncommon sight in Vienna and were probably regarded with even greater hostility by many of the westernised Jews of the city than by the Christian population.

The rigidity with which the eastern Jewish communities shut themselves off from outside influences is the theme of Franzos's most ambitious work, Der Pojaz, completed in 1893, but not published until after his death in 1905. Why this novel, which Franzos regarded as his major work, remained unpublished during his lifetime, is a mystery. It is possible that he thought his critical portrayal of the ghetto might be exploited by antisemitic elements which were becoming increasingly active in Germany in the 1890s. The relations between the Christian and Jewish communities come into sharpest focus in sexual matters—as a young man Franzos fell in love with a Christian girl but renounced her because of the barrier between the two groups. This problem forms the subject of a number of his works, including two of his best novels, Judith Trachtenberg (1890) and Leib Weihnachtskuchen and his Child (1896).

The main focus of his writing is the relationships between the different nationalities of the region—Poles, Ukrainians, Russians, Germans and Jews—and his sympathies clearly lie with the oppressed groups, in particular the Ukrainian peasants and shtetl Jews. He insisted that he was free from racial prejudice and that his attacks on particular nationalities were because they oppressed others:

"I spoke out against the oppression of the Ukrainians and Poles by the Russians, but where the Poles do the same, as is the case in Galicia, then I speak out against their oppression of the Ukrainians, Jews and Germans."

He also "spoke out" against the rigid attitudes and practices of orthodox religion, and in this his attacks were directed above all at his fellow Jews:

"I stand up for the Jews because they are enslaved, but I attack the slavery the orthodox Jews impose on the liberal members of their faith."

His works include:

- Aus Halb-Asien (1876)
- Land und Leute des östlichen Europas (1876)
- Die Juden von Barnow (1877)
- Junge Liebe (1878)
- Stille Geschichten (1880)
- Moschko von Parma (1880)
- Ein Kampf um's Recht (1882)
- Der Präsident (1884)
- Judith Trachtenberg (1890)
- Der Pojaz (1893)
- Deutsche Fahrten. Reise- und Kulturbilder. Erste Reihe: Aus Anhalt und Thüringen (1903/2. Aufl. 1905)
- Der Wahrheitsucher (1904)

== Woyzeck ==
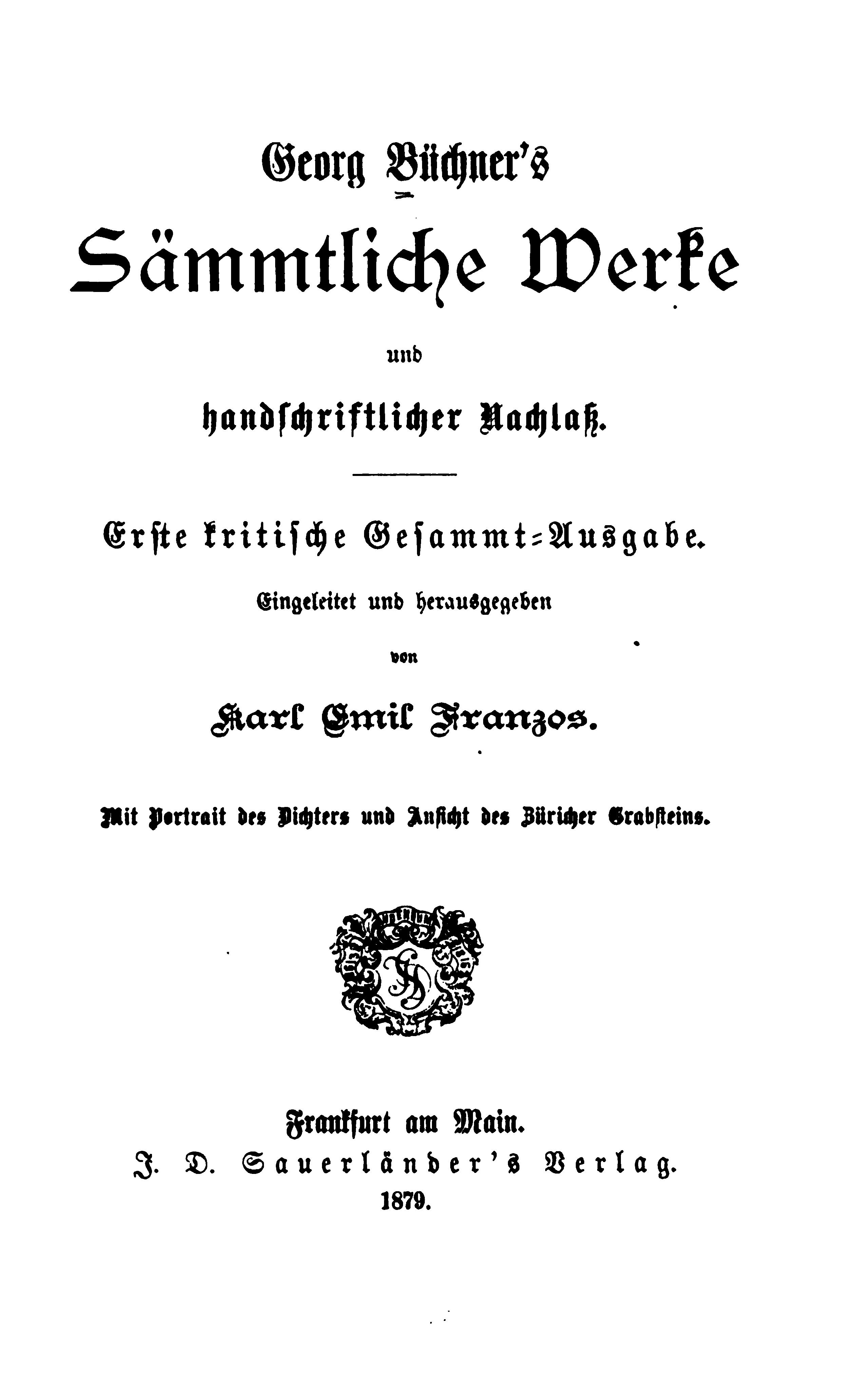
Title page of Franzos's Büchner edition

Franzos is also well known for being the first to publish an edition of Georg Büchner's work, which was vital for the rediscovery of the Vormärz author. Franzos completed his edition in 1879, including plays like Danton's Death and Leonce and Lena. The manuscript of Büchner's drama Woyzeck was difficult to decipher, and had to be treated with chemicals in order to bring the ink up to the surface of the paper, and many of the pages were kept and later destroyed by Büchner's widow, who survived him by four decades. But Franzos's edition was for many years the authoritative version, until the late 1910s when a revival of Büchner's works began in Europe and the many errors in Franzos' edition came to light. These errors include the misspelling of the title, as "Wozzeck" instead of "Woyzeck", an alternate ending that involves Wozzeck drowning in lieu of Büchner's incomplete manuscript, and a fragmented plot without connections between the scenes. Although the play is often performed in newer versions, Franzos' edition has been immortalized in the form of Alban Berg's opera Wozzeck, which uses the Franzos edition as its base.
