= Hubertus Castle (1973 film) =

1973 film

- Directed by: Harald Reinl
- Written by: Werner P. Zibaso
- Based on: Hubertus Castle by Ludwig Ganghofer
- Produced by: Horst Hächler
- Starring: Robert Hoffmann; Carl Lange; Karlheinz Böhm
- Cinematography: Ernst W. Kalinke
- Edited by: Ingeborg Taschner
- Music by: Ernst Brandner
- Production company: CTV 72 Film und Fernsehproduktion
- Distributed by: Constantin Film
- Release date: 19 December 1973
- Running time: 90 minutes
- Country: West Germany
- Language: German

Hubertus Castle is a 1973 German drama film directed by Harald Reinl and starring Robert Hoffmann, Carl Lange and Karlheinz Böhm. It is an adaptation of the 1895 novel of the same name by Ludwig Ganghofer.

== Cast ==
- Robert Hoffmann as Franz Hornegger
- Carl Lange as Graf Egge
- Karlheinz Böhm as Tassilo
- Klaus Löwitsch as Schipper
- Gerhard Riedmann as Lenz Bruckner
- Folker Bohnet as Robert
- Gerlinde Döberl as Mali Bruckner
- Ute Kittelberger as Kitty
- Sascha Hehn as Willy
- Richard Rüdiger as Hans Forbeck
- Rose Renée Roth as Tante Gundula
- Evelyn Opela as Anna Herwegh
- Eva Garden as Liesl Zauner

== Bibliography ==
- Bock, Hans-Michael; Bergfelder, Tim, eds. (2009). The Concise Cinegraph: Encyclopaedia of German Cinema. New York: Berghahn Books. ISBN 978-1-57181-655-9.
