= List of German films of 1931 =

This is a list of German films of 1931. It includes films produced in Germany and German-language films produced elsewhere for release in the German market, often by German subsidiaries of the Hollywood studios.

== A–K ==
Title	Director	Cast	Genre	Notes
1914	Richard Oswald	Albert Bassermann, Hermann Wlach, Reinhold Schünzel	Drama	
24 Hours in the Life of a Woman	Robert Land	Henny Porten, Walter Rilla, Friedrich Kayßler	Drama	
The Adventurer of Tunis	Willi Wolff	Philipp Manning, Ellen Richter, Theo Shall	Adventure	
Alarm at Midnight	Johannes Meyer	Hans Stüwe, Otto Wallburg, Gerda Maurus	Thriller	
Ariane	Paul Czinner	Elisabeth Bergner, Rudolf Forster, Annemarie Steinsieck	Drama	
Ash Wednesday	Johannes Meyer	Karl Ludwig Diehl, Hans Stüwe, Claire Rommer	Drama	
The Battle of Bademunde	Philipp Lothar Mayring	Max Adalbert, Claire Rommer, Paul Wagner	Comedy	
The Beggar Student	Victor Janson	Jarmila Novotná, Fritz Schulz, Hans-Heinz Bollmann	Musical	
Berlin Alexanderplatz	Phil Jutzi	Heinrich George, Margarete Schlegel, Bernhard Minetti	Drama	based on the novel by Alfred Döblin published two years earlier
Between Night and Dawn	Gerhard Lamprecht	Aud Egede-Nissen, Oskar Homolka, Eduard von Winterstein	Drama	
The Big Attraction	Max Reichmann	Richard Tauber, Margo Lion, Marianne Winkelstern	Musical	
Bobby Gets Going	Harry Piel	Harry Piel, Annie Markart, Hilde Hildebrand	Action	
Bombs on Monte Carlo	Hanns Schwarz	Hans Albers, Heinz Rühmann, Anna Sten, Peter Lorre	Comedy	
The Bridegroom's Widow	Richard Eichberg	Mártha Eggerth, Georg Alexander, Fritz Kampers	Comedy	Co-production with UK
By a Nose	Johannes Guter	Sig Arno, Lucie Englisch, Elga Brink	Comedy	
Cadets	Georg Jacoby	Albert Bassermann, Trude von Molo, Johannes Riemann	Drama	
Calais-Dover	Anatole Litvak	Lilian Harvey, Andre Roanne, Armand Bernard	Comedy	Co-production with France
The Captain from Köpenick	Richard Oswald	Max Adalbert, Paul Wagner, Hermann Vallentin	Comedy	
The Case of Colonel Redl	Karl Anton	Theodor Loos, Lil Dagover, Otto Hartmann	Spy drama	Co-production with Czechoslovakia
Checkmate	Georg Asagaroff	Gerda Maurus, Hans Rehmann, Trude Berliner	Drama	
Circus Life	Heinz Paul	Liane Haid, Oscar Marion, Trude Berliner	Drama	
The Concert	Leo Mittler	Olga Chekhova, Oskar Karlweis, Ursula Grabley	Comedy	
A Crafty Youth	Erich Schönfelder	Julius Falkenstein, Sig Arno, Olly Gebauer	Comedy	
Danton	Hans Behrendt	Fritz Kortner, Lucie Mannheim, Gustaf Gründgens	Historical	
The Daredevil	Richard Eichberg	Hans Albers, Gerda Maurus, Mártha Eggerth	Crime	
Demon of the Sea	Michael Curtiz	William Dieterle, Lissy Arna, Anton Pointner	Drama	German-language version of Moby Dick
Die Fledermaus	Karel Lamac	Anny Ondra, Georg Alexander, Oskar Sima	Musical	Co-production with France
Different Morals	Gerhard Lamprecht	Walter Rilla, Elga Brink, Hilde Hildebrand	Comedy	
The Duke of Reichstadt	Viktor Tourjansky	Lien Deyers Grete Natzler, Alfred Abel	Historical	
Duty Is Duty	Carl Boese	Fritz Spira, Ralph Arthur Roberts, Maly Delschaft	Comedy	
Elisabeth of Austria	Adolf Trotz	Lil Dagover, Paul Otto, Charlotte Ander	Period Drama	
Emil and the Detectives	Gerhard Lamprecht	Rolf Wenkhaus, Käthe Haack, Fritz Rasp, Rudolf Biebrach	Family	based on a story by Erich Kästner
The Emperor's Sweetheart	Hans Tintner	Liane Haid, Walter Janssen, Wilhelm Bendow	Musical	
Errant Husbands	Carl Heinz Wolff	Max Adalbert, Hansi Arnstaedt, Henry Bender	Comedy	
Everyone Asks for Erika	Frederic Zelnik	Lya Mara, Alexander Murski, Walter Janssen	Comedy	
Express 13	Alfred Zeisler	Charlotte Susa, Fee Malten, Alfred Beierle	Drama	
The Fate of Renate Langen	Rudolf Walther-Fein	Mady Christians, Francis Lederer	Drama	
The Firm Gets Married	Carl Wilhelm	Ralph Arthur Roberts, Charlotte Ander	Comedy	
The Forester's Daughter	Frederic Zelnik	Irene Eisinger, Paul Richter	Musical	
The Girl and the Boy	Wilhelm Thiele, Roger Le Bon	Lilian Harvey, Henri Garat	Comedy	French-language version
Gloria	Hans Behrendt	Gustav Fröhlich, Brigitte Helm, Fritz Kampers	Drama	
Grock	Carl Boese	Liane Haid, Betty Bird	Circus	
Headfirst into Happiness	Hans Steinhoff	Jenny Jugo, Fritz Schulz	Comedy	
Hell on Earth	Victor Trivas	Ernst Busch, Vladimir Sokoloff	War drama	
Her Grace Commands	Hanns Schwarz	Käthe von Nagy, Willy Fritsch	Romantic Comedy	French-language version also released
Her Majesty the Barmaid	Joe May	Käthe von Nagy, Francis Lederer	Comedy	
Hooray, It's a Boy!	Georg Jacoby	Lucie Englisch, Max Adalbert	Comedy	
I Go Out and You Stay Here	Hans Behrendt	Camilla Horn, Hermine Sterler	Comedy	
I'll Stay with You	Johannes Meyer	Jenny Jugo, Hermann Thimig	Comedy	
In der Nacht	Walter Ruttmann			
In the Employ of the Secret Service	Gustav Ucicky	Brigitte Helm, Willy Fritsch, Oskar Homolka	Spy drama	
Inquest	Robert Siodmak	Albert Bassermann, Gustav Fröhlich	Crime	
Kameradschaft (Comradeship)	Georg Wilhelm Pabst	Ernst Busch		Fr. title: La Tragédie de la mine
Der Kongreß tanzt (Congress Dances)	Erik Charell	Lilian Harvey, Willy Fritsch, Conrad Veidt	Comedy	French-language version: Le Congrès s'amuse

== L–Z ==
Title	Director	Cast	Genre	Notes
The Little Escapade	Reinhold Schünzel	Renate Müller, Hermann Thimig, Otto Wallburg	Comedy	
Louise, Queen of Prussia	Carl Froelich	Henny Porten, Gustaf Gründgens, Ekkehard Arendt	Historical	
The Love Express	Robert Wiene	Georg Alexander, Dina Gralla, Joseph Schmidt	Musical Comedy	
M	Fritz Lang	Peter Lorre, Otto Wernicke, Gustaf Gründgens	Thriller	Remade as 1951 film
Madame Pompadour	Willi Wolff	Anny Ahlers, Kurt Gerron, Ida Wüst	Musical	
Mädchen in Uniform	Leontine Sagan	Hertha Thiele, Dorothea Wieck, Emilia Unda	Drama	Girls in Uniform
The Man in Search of His Murderer	Robert Siodmak	Heinz Rühmann, Lien Deyers, Hans Leibelt	Comedy	
The Man Who Murdered	Curtis Bernhardt	Conrad Veidt, Trude von Molo, Heinrich George	Crime	
Marriage with Limited Liability	Franz Wenzler	Charlotte Susa, Georg Alexander, Hans Moser	Comedy	Co-production with Austria
Mary	Alfred Hitchcock	Alfred Abel, Olga Chekhova, Paul Graetz	Crime	German version of Hitchcock's Murder! (1930)
Men Behind Bars	Pál Fejös	Heinrich George, Gustav Diessl, Egon von Jordan	Drama	Made in the US
The Merry Wives of Vienna	Géza von Bolváry	Willi Forst, Lee Parry, Paul Hörbiger	Musical comedy	
Moritz Makes His Fortune	Jaap Speyer	Sig Arno, Willy Prager, Viktor Schwanneke	Comedy	
Mountains on Fire	Karl Hartl, Luis Trenker	Lissy Arna, Luigi Serventi, Claus Clausen	War	
The Murder Trial of Mary Dugan	Arthur Robison	Nora Gregor, Egon von Jordan, Peter Erkelenz	Mystery drama	German-language version of an American film
The Murderer Dimitri Karamazov	Erich Engels	Fritz Kortner, Anna Sten, Fritz Rasp	Drama	
My Cousin from Warsaw	Carl Boese	Liane Haid, Tala Birell, Fritz Schulz	Comedy	
My Heart Longs for Love	Eugen Thiele	Trude Berliner, Max Adalbert, Johannes Riemann	Musical	
My Leopold	Hans Steinhoff	Max Adalbert, Harald Paulsen, Camilla Spira	Comedy	
My Wife, the Impostor	Kurt Gerron	Heinz Rühmann, Käthe von Nagy	Comedy	
A Night at the Grand Hotel	Max Neufeld	Mártha Eggerth, Ulrich Bettac, Kurt Gerron	Drama	
The Night of Decision	Dimitri Buchowetzki	Conrad Veidt, Olga Chekhova, Trude Hesterberg	Drama	German-language version of an American film
The Night Without Pause	Andrew Marton, Franz Wenzler	Sig Arno, Camilla Horn	Comedy	
No Man's Land	Victor Trivas	Ernst Busch, Vladimir Sokoloff	War	
No More Love	Anatole Litvak	Lilian Harvey, Harry Liedtke	Musical comedy	
The Office Manager	Hans Behrendt	Felix Bressart, Hermann Thimig	Comedy	
Once I Loved a Girl in Vienna	Erich Schönfelder	Werner Fuetterer, Gretl Theimer	Comedy	
One Hour of Happiness	William Dieterle	Evelyn Holt, Harald Paulsen	Drama	
The Other Side	Heinz Paul	Conrad Veidt, Theodor Loos	War	
Panic in Chicago	Robert Wiene	Olga Chekhova, Hans Rehmann	Crime	
The Paw	Hans Steinhoff	Charlotte Susa, Hans Rehmann, Fritz Rasp	Thriller	Co-production with Italy
Peace of Mind	Max Obal	Fritz Kampers, Lucie Englisch	Comedy	
The Private Secretary	Wilhelm Thiele	Renate Müller, Hermann Thimig	Musical	
Reckless Youth	Leo Mittler	Camilla Horn, Walter Rilla	Drama	
Road to Rio	Manfred Noa	Maria Matray, Oskar Homolka	Crime	
Ronny	Reinhold Schünzel	Käthe von Nagy, Willy Fritsch	Musical comedy	
Queen of the Night	Fritz Wendhausen	Friedl Haerlin, Karl Ludwig Diehl	Musical	German-language version of a French film
The Sacred Flame	William Dieterle, Berthold Viertel	Gustav Fröhlich, Dita Parlo, Hans Heinrich von Twardowski	Drama	German-language version of an American film
Salto Mortale	E. A. Dupont	Anna Sten, Anton Walbrook	Drama	
The Secret of the Red Cat	Erich Schönfelder	Margot Landa, Ernö Verebes, Sig Arno	Comedy crime	
Shadows of the Underworld	Harry Piel	Harry Piel, Dary Holm, Elisabeth Pinajeff	Thriller	
The Schlemihl	Max Nosseck	Curt Bois, La Jana, Hans Adalbert Schlettow	Comedy	
Schubert's Dream of Spring	Richard Oswald	Gretl Theimer, Lucie Englisch	Musical	
The Scoundrel	Eugen Schüfftan, Franz Wenzler	Max Adalbert, Emilia Unda	Comedy	
Shooting Festival in Schilda	Adolf Trotz	Sig Arno, Fritz Kampers, Eugen Rex	Comedy	
The Soaring Maiden	Carl Boese	Lissy Arna, S. Z. Sakall	Comedy	
The Song of Life	Alexis Granowsky	Aribert Mog, Elsa Wagner, Carl Goetz	Drama	
The Song of the Nations	Rudolf Meinert	Camilla Horn, Igo Sym, Betty Amann	Musical	
The Spanish Fly	Georg Jacoby	Betty Bird, Lizzi Waldmüller, Fritz Schulz	Comedy	
The Squeaker	Martin Frič, Karel Lamač	Lissy Arna, Karl Ludwig Diehl, Fritz Rasp	Mystery	
Storm in a Water Glass	Georg Jacoby	Hansi Niese, Renate Müller	Comedy	Co-production with Austria
A Storm Over Zakopane	Domenico Gambino, Adolf Trotz	Alfons Fryland; Lilian Ellis	Drama	Produced in partnership with Poland
The Stranger	Fred Sauer	Gerda Maurus, Harry Hardt, Grete Natzler	Drama	Co-production with France
The Street Song	Lupu Pick	Ernst Busch, Hans Deppe	Musical	
Student Life in Merry Springtime	Heinz Paul	Anita Dorris, Fritz Alberti	Musical	
Such a Greyhound	Carl Heinz Wolff	Ralph Arthur Roberts, Max Adalbert, Lucie Englisch	Comedy	
Terror of the Garrison	Carl Boese	Felix Bressart, Lucie Englisch	Comedy	
That's All That Matters	Joe May	Nora Gregor, Harry Liedtke	Musical comedy	
The Theft of the Mona Lisa	Géza von Bolváry	Willi Forst, Trude von Molo, Gustaf Gründgens	Drama	
Three Days of Love	Heinz Hilpert	Hans Albers, Käthe Dorsch, Trude Berliner	Drama	
The Threepenny Opera	Georg Wilhelm Pabst	Rudolf Forster, Lotte Lenya	Musical	A film of Bertolt Brecht; French version: L'Opéra de quat'sous
The Trunks of Mr. O.F.	Alexis Granowsky	Peter Lorre, Alfred Abel	Comedy	
The True Jacob	Hans Steinhoff	Ralph Arthur Roberts, Anny Ahlers	Comedy	
The Unfaithful Eckehart	Carl Boese	Ralph Arthur Roberts, Paul Hörbiger	Comedy	
The Unknown Guest	E. W. Emo	S.Z. Sakall, Lucie Englisch, Kurt Vespermann	Comedy	
Die verliebte Firma	Max Ophüls			
Venetian Nights	Pierre Billon, Robert Wiene	Florelle Roger Tréville	Musical	French-language version of The Love Express
Victoria and Her Hussar	Richard Oswald	Michael Bohnen, Iván Petrovich	Musical	
The Virtuous Sinner	Fritz Kortner	Max Pallenberg, Heinz Rühmann, Dolly Haas	Comedy	
A Waltz by Strauss	Conrad Wiene	Hans Junkermann, Gustav Fröhlich	Historical	
Weekend in Paradise	Robert Land	Trude Berliner, Claire Rommer	comedy	
When the Soldiers	Jacob Fleck, Luise Fleck	Otto Wallburg, Gretl Theimer, Ida Wüst	Comedy	
The White Ecstasy	Arnold Fanck	Leni Riefenstahl, Hannes Schneider	Adventure	
Who Takes Love Seriously?	Erich Engel	Max Hansen, Jenny Jugo	Romantic comedy	
Wibbel the Tailor	Paul Henckels	Paul Henckels, Wolfgang Zilzer	Comedy	
Without Meyer, No Celebration is Complete	Carl Boese	Sig Arno, Dina Gralla	Comedy	
Woman in the Jungle	Dimitri Buchowetzki	Charlotte Ander, Ernst Stahl-Nachbaur, Erich Ponto	Drama	MLV shot in Paris.
The Woman They Talk About	Victor Janson	Mady Christians, Hans Stüwe	Drama	
The Wrong Husband	Johannes Guter	Johannes Riemann, Maria Paudler	Comedy	
The Yellow House of King-Fu	Karl Grune	Charlotte Susa, Gustav Diessl, Karl Günther	Crime thriller	Co-production with France
Yorck	Gustav Ucicky	Werner Krauss, Gustaf Gründgens	Historical war	

== Documentaries ==
Title	Director	Cast	Genre	Notes
Bunte Tierwelt	Ulrich K. T. Schultz		documentary	
Dienen will ich	Gertrud David		documentary	
Geheimnisse im Pflanzenleben	Wilhelm Prager		documentary	
Goldgräber in Rumänien	Ulrich K. T. Schultz, Johannes Guter		documentary	
Am grossen Strom	Adolf Freiherr von Dungern		documentary	
Himatschal – Der Thron der Götter	Günter Oskar Dyhrenfurth		documentary	
Im Auto durch zwei Welten	Clärenore Stinnes		documentary	
Instinkt und Verstand	Felix Lampe		documentary	
Das Kind und die Welt	Eberhard Frowein		documentary	
Liebe im Strandkorb	Peter Schaeffers, Guenther Schwenn		documentary	
Menschen im Busch	Friedrich Dalsheim, Gulla Pfeffer		documentary	
Tanzendes Holz	Ulrich K. T. Schultz		documentary	
Wunder der Tierwelt im Wasser	Felix Lampe		documentary	

== Short films ==
Title	Director	Cast	Genre	Notes
Geisterschenke	Paul N. Peroff		Animation	
Die geknipste Frau	Paul N. Peroff		Animation	
Harlekin	Lotte Reiniger		Animation	
Ins dritte Reich	Alois Floroth, Karl Holtz		animated propaganda	Available online here
Liebesspiel	Oskar Fischinger		animation	
Melodie der Wellen	Hans Fischerkoesen		Animation	
Studie Nr. 7	Oskar Fischinger		Animation	
Studie Nr. 8	Oskar Fischinger		Animation	
Studie Nr. 9	Oskar Fischinger		Animation	
