= It's Easy to Become a Father =

1926 film

- German film poster
- German: Vater werden ist nicht schwer
- Directed by: Erich Schönfelder
- Written by: Alfred Halm; Ernst von Wolzogen (novella)
- Produced by: Richard Eichberg
- Starring: Lilian Harvey; Harry Halm; Albert Paulig
- Cinematography: Walter Harvey-Pape; Fritz Arno Wagner
- Music by: Werner R. Heymann
- Production companies: Richard Eichberg-Film; UFA
- Distributed by: Parufamet
- Release date: 31 December 1926
- Country: Germany
- Languages: Silent; German intertitles

It's Easy to Become a Father (German: Vater werden ist nicht schwer) is a 1926 German silent comedy film directed by Erich Schönfelder and starring Lilian Harvey, Harry Halm and Albert Paulig. It was made at the Johannisthal Studios in Berlin. The film's art direction was by Jacek Rotmil.

== Cast ==
- Lilian Harvey as Harriet
- Harry Halm as Lord Douglas
- Albert Paulig as Snake
- Hans Mierendorff as Thomas A. Unterberry, Kansas City
- Franz Egenieff as Lord James Fairfax
- Mathilde Sussin as Lady Eliza, Lord Douglas' wife
- Julius Falkenstein as commissioner
- Robert Négrel as dancer
- Gaston Briese as Fred, Lord Douglas' friend
- Sig Arno
- Max Nosseck
- E. Herrmann as Mr. Barklay
- Julia Serda as Madame Duverney
- Adrienne Wieprecht as Celia Barklay
