= Father Won't Allow It =

1921 film

- German: Papa kann's nicht lassen
- Directed by: Erich Schönfelder
- Written by: Alfred Fekete; Erich Schönfelder
- Produced by: Paul Davidson
- Cinematography: Carl Drews
- Production company: PAGU
- Distributed by: UFA
- Release date: 9 December 1921
- Country: Germany
- Languages: Silent; German intertitles

Father Won't Allow It (German: Papa kann's nicht lassen) is a 1921 German silent comedy film directed by Erich Schönfelder.

The film's sets were designed by the art director Robert Neppach.

== Cast ==
In alphabetical order

- Anton Edthofer as Toni Biebelhuber
- Julius Falkenstein as Graf von und zu Bürstenberg
- Hans Junkermann as Baron Geisenbach
- Anni Korff as Dora Haller
- Lotte Neumann as Hally Geisenbach
- Erich Schönfelder as Kunsthändler Haas
- Emmy Wyda as Amanda Geisenbach
