= Polish Economy (film) =

1928 film

- Directed by: E. W. Emo
- Written by: Richard Kessler; Curt Kraatz (play); Georg Okonkowsky (play); Walter Wassermann
- Starring: Iwa Wanja; Margot Landa; Hans Brausewetter
- Cinematography: Willy Goldberger; Hans Karl Gottschalk; László Schäffer
- Music by: Walter Ulfig
- Production company: Strauss Film
- Distributed by: Strauss Film
- Release date: 23 August 1928
- Country: Germany
- Languages: Silent; German intertitles

Polish Management or Polish Economy (German: Polnische Wirtschaft) is a 1928 German propaganda silent film directed by E. W. Emo and starring Iwa Wanja, Margot Landa, and Hans Brausewetter. It was one of a number of films attacking Poland's ownership of lands in which ethnic Germans lived during the 1920s.

The film's art direction was by Kurt Richter.

== Cast ==
- Iwa Wanja as Marga
- Margot Landa as Erika
- Hans Brausewetter as Willy
- Henry Bender as Puppke
- Sig Arno as Bronislaw
- Else Reval as Gabriele
- Teddy Bill as Windig
- Paul Henckels as Onkel
- Emmy Wyda as Tante
- Franz Klebusch as Klebusch
- Hugo Döblin as Notar
- Curt Cappi as Richter
- Wolfgang von Schwindt as Köchin

== Bibliography ==
- Kopp, Kristin Leigh (2012). Germany's Wild East: Constructing Poland as Colonial Space. Ann Arbor: University of Michigan Press. ISBN 978-0-472-11844-1.
