= Why Cry at Parting? =

1929 film directed by Richard Eichberg

- Directed by: Richard Eichberg
- Written by: Alfred Halm; Friedrich Stein
- Produced by: Richard Eichberg
- Starring: Dina Gralla; Harry Halm; Paul Morgan
- Cinematography: Heinrich Gärtner
- Music by: Hans May
- Production companies: Richard Eichberg-Film; British International Pictures; UFA
- Distributed by: Süd-Film (Germany)
- Release date: 15 August 1929
- Running time: 88 minutes
- Countries: Germany; United Kingdom
- Languages: Silent; German intertitles

Why Cry at Parting? (German: Wer wird denn weinen, wenn man auseinandergeht?) is a 1929 British-German silent comedy film directed by Richard Eichberg and starring Dina Gralla, Harry Halm and Paul Morgan. It was shot at the Babelsberg Studios in Berlin and on location in Southampton. The film's sets were designed by the art directors Willi Herrmann, Herbert O. Phillips and Werner Schlichting.

== Synopsis ==
Private detective Sybil Werner is hired by Harder, the head of the banking house of the same name, to pursue one of his employees Frank Western who he believes has embezzled money from the firm. She follows him onboard a ocean liner leaving for South America, but soon finds the charming man she encounters very different to what she has expected. The two fall in love and she able to prove he is innocent of the crime he is suspected of.

== Cast ==
- Dina Gralla as Sybil Werner
- Harry Halm as Frank Western, Prokurist von Harder & Co.
- Paul Morgan as Harder, Chef des Bankhauses Harder & Co.
- Antonie Jaeckel as Mrs. Harder, seine Frau
- Lottina Baart as Agathe, seine Tochter
- S.Z. Sakall as Gottgetreu, Kassierer von Harder & Co.
- Paul Hörbiger as Tortoni, ein Illusionist
- Vera Voronina as Pamela, seine Partnerin
- Gerhard Pechner sings: "Casanova"
- Maria Forescu
- Else Reval
- Adi Seitz as Adelheid
- Sylvia Torf
- Felix Verna as Black Dancer
- Michael von Newlinsky

== Bibliography ==
- Hans-Michael Bock and Tim Bergfelder. The Concise Cinegraph: An Encyclopedia of German Cinema. Berghahn Books, 2009.
