= Come Back, All Is Forgiven (film) =

1929 film directed by Erich Schönfelder

- Directed by: Erich Schönfelder
- Written by: Victor Abel; Paul Martin; Karl Ritter
- Produced by: Martin Pichert
- Starring: Dina Gralla; Rudolf Biebrach; Emmy Wyda
- Cinematography: Axel Graatkjær
- Music by: Werner Schmidt-Boelcke
- Production company: Olympia Film
- Distributed by: Süd-Film
- Release date: 6 September 1929
- Running time: 87 minutes
- Country: Germany
- Languages: Silent; German intertitles

Come Back, All Is Forgiven (German: Kehre zurück! Alles vergeben!) is a 1929 German silent comedy film directed by Erich Schönfelder and starring Dina Gralla, Rudolf Biebrach and Emmy Wyda. It was shot at the Staaken Studios in Berlin. The film's sets were designed by the art directors Wilhelm Depenau and Heinrich Richter.

== Cast ==
- Dina Gralla as Gina Tieck
- Rudolf Biebrach as Kommerzienrat Tieck, Ihr Vater
- Emmy Wyda as Tante Hoopje aus Holland
- Teddy Bill as Teddy, Ihr Sohn
- Robin Irvine as Rolf Irwisch
- Albert Paulig as Ham, 1. Ganove
- Siegfried Berisch as Eggs, 2. Ganove
- Anna Müller-Lincke as Frau Falkenhorst
- Else Reval as Katherina Sinnlich
- Hugo Werner-Kahle as Der Schaubudenbesitzer
- Wolfgang von Schwindt as Der Mann Mit Der Maulsperre
- Heinrich Gotho

== Bibliography ==
- Bock, Hans-Michael & Bergfelder, Tim. The Concise Cinegraph: Encyclopaedia of German Cinema. Berghahn Books, 2009.
