= The Woman from Till 12 =

1928 film directed by Erich Schönfelder

- German film poster
- German: Das Fräulein von Kasse 12
- Directed by: Erich Schönfelder
- Written by: Alfred Halm; Wilhelm Stücklen
- Produced by: Richard Eichberg
- Starring: Werner Fuetterer; Dina Gralla
- Cinematography: Walter Harvey-Pape; Károly Vass
- Music by: Walter Ulfig
- Production company: Richard Eichberg-Film
- Distributed by: Parufamet
- Release date: 5 January 1928
- Running time: 78 minutes
- Country: Germany
- Languages: Silent; German intertitles

The Woman from Till 12 (German: Das Fräulein von Kasse 12) is a 1928 German silent comedy film directed by Erich Schönfelder and starring Werner Fuetterer and Dina Gralla. Much of the film's action takes place in a department store. It was shot at the Johannisthal Studios in Berlin. The film's sets were designed by Kurt Richter. It was released as part of the Parufamet agreement between UFA and the major Hollywood companies.

== Cast ==
In alphabetical order

- Henry Bender
- Ruth Feiner
- Werner Fuetterer as Freddie Werder - Young Man
- Dina Gralla as Grete Schober - Cashier
- Fritz Hirsch
- Erich Kaiser-Titz
- Margarete Lanner
- Leopold von Ledebur
- Emmy Wyda
