= It Attracted Three Fellows =

1928 German silent comedy film by Carl Wilhelm

- Directed by: Carl Wilhelm
- Written by: Max Ehrlich; Fred Sauer; Walter Wassermann
- Starring: Hans Albers; Hans Junkermann; Eugen Burg
- Cinematography: Eduard von Borsody
- Music by: Walter Ulfig
- Production company: Domo-Strauss-Film
- Distributed by: Strauss-Film
- Release date: 1 March 1928
- Country: Germany
- Languages: Silent; German intertitles

It Attracted Three Fellows (German: Es zogen drei Burschen) is a 1928 German silent comedy film directed by Carl Wilhelm and starring Hans Albers, Hans Junkermann and Eugen Burg. Its title is a shortened version of the name of a popular song "Es zogen drei Burschen wohl über den Rhein".

The film's sets were designed by the art director Kurt Richter.

== Cast ==
- Hans Albers as Strafversetzter Oberleutnant
- Hans Junkermann as General
- Eugen Burg as Spiessbürgerin
- Hertha von Walther as Tänzerin
- Julia Serda as Spiessbürgerin
- Karl Harbacher as Soldat
- Fritz Kampers as Soldat
- Ida Wüst as Spiessbürgerin
- Olga Engl
- Ossi Oswalda
- Hans Brausewetter
- Teddy Bill
- Harry Lamberts-Paulsen
- Emmy Wyda

== Bibliography ==
- Alfred Krautz. International directory of cinematographers, set- and costume designers in film, Volume 4. Saur, 1984.
