= Serenissimus and the Last Virgin =

1928 film

- Directed by: Leo Mittler
- Written by: Erich Weissenberg; Curt Wesse
- Cinematography: Willy Goldberger
- Music by: Walter Ulfig
- Production company: Strauss Film
- Distributed by: Strauss Film
- Release date: 1 November 1928
- Country: Germany
- Languages: Silent; German intertitles

Serenissimus and the Last Virgin (German:Serenissimus und die letzte Jungfrau) is a 1928 German silent film directed by Leo Mittler and starring Hans Junkermann, Adolphe Engers and Adele Sandrock.

The film's art direction was by Kurt Richter.

== Cast ==
- Hans Junkermann as Serenissimus
- Adolphe Engers as Kindermann
- Adele Sandrock as Fürstin-Tante, der Schrecken von Luxenstein
- Ernö Verebes as Bob, Tanz-Adjutant
- Margot Landa as Dina
- Teddy Bill as Teddy, Reporter
- Yvette Darnys as Yvette
- Sig Arno as Clement
- Max Schreck as Finanzminister von Krampf
- Leopold von Ledebur as Notar Grünsprecht
- Martin Wolfgang as Brillant, Theateragent
- Ludwig Stössel as Direktor der Florida-Bar
