= Die zärtlichen Verwandten =

1930 film directed by Richard Oswald

The Tender Relatives
- Directed by: Richard Oswald
- Written by: Fritz Friedmann-Frederich; Ernst Neubach
- Produced by: Richard Oswald
- Starring: Harald Paulsen; Charlotte Ander; Felix Bressart; Ralph Arthur Roberts
- Cinematography: Friedl Behn-Grund
- Music by: Felix Gunther; Willy Rosen
- Production company: Richard-Oswald-Produktion
- Distributed by: Atlas Film
- Release date: 29 August 1930
- Running time: 97 minutes
- Country: Germany
- Language: German

Die zärtlichen Verwandten (The Tender Kinsfolk, The Tender Relatives) is a 1930 German comedy film directed by Richard Oswald and starring Harald Paulsen, Charlotte Ander, and Felix Bressart. The film's art direction was overseen by Franz Schroedter.

== Cast ==
- Harald Paulsen as Herr Linsemann
- Charlotte Ander as Frau Linsemann
- Felix Bressart as Uncle Emil
- Ralph Arthur Roberts as Uncle Adolf
- Paul Henckels as Herr Weber
- Emmy Wyda as Frau Weber
- Gustl Gstettenbaur as Weber's son
- Harry Nestor as Cousin Wilhelm
- Lotte Lorring as Wilhelm's wife
- Hans Hermann Schaufuß as Herr Stempel
- Adele Sandrock as Frau Stempel
- Wilhelm Bendow as Uhl, a musician
- Camilla von Hollay as a child-minder
- Kurt Lilien as the factotum
- Willy Rosen as a singer

== Bibliography ==
- Kasten, Jürgen & Loacker, Armin. Richard Oswald: Kino zwischen Spektakel, Aufklärung und Unterhaltung. Verlag Filmarchiv Austria, 2005.
