= At Your Orders, Sergeant =

1932 film directed by Erich Schönfelder

- German film poster
- German: Zu Befehl, Herr Unteroffizier
- Directed by: Erich Schönfelder
- Written by: Arnold Lippschitz
- Produced by: Erich Engels
- Starring: Ralph Arthur Roberts; Ida Wüst; Margot Landa
- Cinematography: Willy Hameister
- Music by: Will Meisel
- Production companies: Engels & Schmidt Tonfilm
- Distributed by: Erich Engels-Film
- Release date: 7 January 1932
- Running time: 86 minutes
- Country: Germany
- Language: German

At Your Orders, Sergeant (German: Zu Befehl, Herr Unteroffizier) is a 1932 German comedy film directed by Erich Schönfelder and starring Ralph Arthur Roberts, Ida Wüst and Margot Landa. It was shot at the Johannisthal Studios in Berlin. The film's sets were designed by the art directors Willi Herrmann and Herbert Lippschitz. It is a military farce set in the pre-First World War-era German Army.

== Cast ==
- Ralph Arthur Roberts
- Ida Wüst
- Margot Walter
- Emmy Sturm
- Henry Bender
- Albert Paulig
- Harry Halm
- Paul Westermeier
- Hermann Speelmans
- Lotte Werkmeister

== Bibliography ==
- Klaus, Ulrich J. Deutsche Tonfilme: Jahrgang 1932. Klaus-Archiv, 1988.
