= Dorrit's Pleasure Trip =

1916 film

- Directed by: Paul Heidemann
- Produced by: David Oliver
- Cinematography: Martin J. Knopps
- Production company: Oliver-Film
- Release date: 1916
- Country: Germany
- Languages: Silent; German intertitles

Dorrit's Pleasure Trip (German: Dorittchens Vergnügungsreise) is a 1916 German silent film comedy directed by Paul Heidemann.

== Cast ==
- Dorrit Weixler as Dorrit
- Kurt Busch
- Alice Hechy
- Bruno Kastner as Geliebter
- Albert Paul
- Frida Richard
- Berthold Rose as Vater
- Emmy Wyda

== Bibliography ==
- Thomas, Douglas B. (1999). The Early History of German Motion Pictures, 1895–1935. Washington, DC: Thomas International. ISBN 978-0-9612128-1-0.
