= Children of Fortune =

1931 film by Alexander Esway

- Directed by: Alexander Esway
- Written by: Frank Launder; Miles Malleson
- Starring: Dina Gralla; Kurt Vespermann; Vicky Werckmeister
- Cinematography: Ernest Palmer; Leo Rogers
- Edited by: Edward B. Jarvis
- Production company: British International Pictures
- Distributed by: Süd-Film
- Release date: 6 December 1931
- Running time: 75 minutes
- Countries: Germany; United Kingdom
- Language: German

Children of Fortune (German: Kinder des Glücks) is a 1931 British-German crime film directed by Alexander Esway and starring Dina Gralla, Kurt Vespermann and Vicky Werckmeister. It was made as the German-language version of Children of Chance. It was made at Elstree Studios and distributed in Germany by Süd-Film, which was owned by British International Pictures.

== Cast ==
- Dina Gralla
- Kurt Vespermann
- Vicky Werckmeister
- Jenny Kiefe
- Wera Engels
- Ekkehard Arendt
- Michael von Newlinsky
- Teddy Bill
- Rudolf Meinhard-Jünger

== Bibliography ==
- Murphy, Robert. Directors in British and Irish Cinema: A Reference Companion. British Film Institute, 2006.
