= Distorting at the Resort =

1932 film

- German film poster
- German: Lügen auf Rügen
- Directed by: Victor Janson
- Written by: Heinz Goldberg
- Produced by: Gabriel Levy
- Starring: Maria Matray; Paul Hörbiger; Otto Wallburg
- Cinematography: Guido Seeber
- Music by: Marc Roland
- Production company: Aafa-Film
- Distributed by: Aafa-Film
- Release date: 8 January 1932
- Running time: 83 minutes
- Country: Germany
- Language: German

Distorting at the Resort (German: Lügen auf Rügen) is a 1932 German comedy film directed by Victor Janson and starring Maria Matray, Paul Hörbiger, and Otto Wallburg. It was shot at the Tempelhof Studios in Berlin. The film's sets were designed by the art director Jacek Rotmil.

== Synopsis ==
A young woman wins a stay in a seaside holiday resort by winning a contest. However, once she arrives it is wrongly believed that she is an American millionairess.

== Cast ==
- Maria Matray as Vanda Built
- Paul Hörbiger as Fritz Garreis
- Otto Wallburg as Abeles
- Ralph Arthur Roberts as Dr. Schmidt
- Olga Limburg as Frau Schmidt
- Kenneth Rive
- Heinz Wagner as Boy
- Kitty Meinhardt
- Julius Falkenstein as Herr Built
- Aenne Goerling
- Carl Neisser
- Lucie Euler
- Leopold von Ledebur
- Cläre Lotto
- Emmy Wyda
- Paul Vincenti as His Highness
- Hansi Dege
- Max Ralph-Ostermann
- Enzio Frelani
- Tibor Kasics

== Bibliography ==
- Klaus, Ulrich J. Deutsche Tonfilme: Jahrgang 1932. Klaus-Archiv, 1988. ISBN 978-3-927352-07-0.
