= Mischievous Miss =

1930 film directed by Erich Schönfelder

- German film poster
- German: Fräulein Lausbub
- Directed by: Erich Schönfelder
- Written by: Victor Abel; Karl Ritter
- Starring: Julius Falkenstein; Dina Gralla; Albert Paulig; Josefine Dora
- Cinematography: Axel Graatkjær
- Production company: Olympia Film
- Distributed by: Süd-Film
- Release date: 28 January 1930
- Running time: 84 minutes
- Country: Germany
- Languages: Silent; German intertitles

Mischievous Miss (German: Fräulein Lausbub) is a 1930 German silent comedy film directed by Erich Schönfelder and starring Julius Falkenstein, Dina Gralla and Albert Paulig. It was made at the Staaken Studios in Berlin, with some scenes shot on location in Portugal. The film's sets were designed by the art director Heinrich Richter. It premiered at Berlin's Marmorhaus cinema.

== Cast ==
- Julius Falkenstein as Baron Eggloffsburg
- Dina Gralla as Daisy, his daughter
- Albert Paulig as Uncle Egon
- Josefine Dora as Aunt Josefine
- Wolfgang von Schwindt as Uncle Adolf
- Emmy Wyda as Aunt Agathe
- Arthur Duarte as Rittmeister Frank Neuhaus
- Robin Irvine as Harry Spring, his friend
- Siegfried Berisch as stable master Arisch
- Max Nosseck as Bob, ein Stalljunge
- Ernst Behmer as Pächter Schreck
- Gustl Herrmann as his wife
- Else Reval as Kathi Ferkl, Gutsmamsell
