= By a Nose (1931 film) =

1931 film directed by Johannes Guter

- Directed by: Johannes Guter
- Written by: Bobby E. Lüthge; Willy Prager
- Produced by: Jacob Brodsky
- Starring: Sig Arno; Lucie Englisch; Elga Brink
- Cinematography: Karl Hasselmann; Hermann Böttger
- Music by: Will Meisel; Siegfried Translateur
- Production company: Gnom-Tonfilm
- Distributed by: Metropol-Filmverleih
- Release date: 28 August 1931
- Running time: 95 minutes
- Country: Germany
- Language: German

By a Nose (German: Um eine Nasenlänge) is a 1931 German sports comedy film directed by Johannes Guter and starring Sig Arno, Lucie Englisch and Elga Brink. It was made at the Halensee Studios in Berlin. Location shooting took place at the Berlin Sportpalast. The film's sets were designed by the art directors Emil Hasler and Otto Hunte. It was remade as a 1949 West German film of the same title directed by E.W. Emo.

== Synopsis ==
A newspaper delivery man pretends to be a six day bicycle racer in order to impress a woman. Having hung around the stadium in order to make his boast convincing, a series of confusions lead to him taking the place of a real rider. Despite his lack of professional training, he manages to win the race "by a nose".

== Cast ==
- Sig Arno as Hans Dampf, ein Zeitungsfahrer
- Lucie Englisch as Lilly
- Elga Brink as Marion, Tänzerin
- Ernö Verebes as Teddy, ein Mixer
- Fred Louis Lerch as Paul Renz, Sechstagerennfahrer
- Julius Falkenstein as Lachmeyer, Trainer
- Max Ehrlich as Herr Bumsdorf
- Paul Kemp as Sperling, ein Rennbahnbesucher
- Fritz Alberti as Der Mann am Mikrophon
- Frida Richard as Mutter Schmidt
- Else Reval as Seine Frau
- Ellen Plessow as Die Frau am Telephon
- Julius E. Hermann as Der dicke Ehemann
- Hugo Döblin as Ein Althwarenändler
- Carla Gidt as Das Mädel am Kiosk
- Lissy Arna as Filmstar, der den Startschuß abgibt
- Paul Buschenhagen as Buschenhagen, Partner von Renz

== Bibliography ==
- Hales, Barbara & Weinstein, Valerie. Rethinking Jewishness in Weimar Cinema. Berghahn Books, 2020.
- Hutter, Andreas & Kamolz, Klaus. Billie Wilder: Eine Europäische Karriere. Böhlau, 1998.
