= How Do I Marry the Boss? =

1927 film directed by Erich Schönfelder

- German: Wie heirate ich meinen Chef?
- Directed by: Erich Schönfelder
- Written by: Alfred Halm
- Starring: Henri De Vries; Robert Garrison; Dina Gralla
- Cinematography: Franz Planer
- Production company: Ewe-Film
- Distributed by: Süd-Film
- Release date: 5 May 1927
- Country: Germany
- Languages: Silent; German intertitles

How Do I Marry the Boss? (German: Wie heirate ich meinen Chef?) is a 1927 German silent comedy film directed by Erich Schönfelder and starring Henri De Vries, Robert Garrison, and Dina Gralla. The film's sets were designed by the art director Max Heilbronner.

== Cast ==
In alphabetical order

- Henri De Vries
- Robert Garrison
- Dina Gralla
- Hélène Hallier
- Harry Halm
- Albert Paulig
- Else Reval
- Rosa Valetti
- Kurt Vespermann
