= Teddy Bill =

Austrian actor (1900–1949)

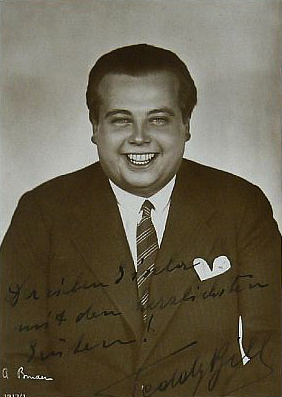
- Bill, ca. 1925
- Born: Hans Günter Leo Kern; 18 November 1900; Vienna, Austro-Hungarian Empire
- Died: 11 February 1949 (aged 48)
- Other names: Teddy Kern
- Occupation: Actor
- Years active: 1920–1949

Teddy Bill (born Hans Günter Leo Kern; 18 November 1900 – 11 February 1949) was an Austrian actor. Later in his career he was also credited as Teddy Kern.

== Selected filmography ==
- Princess Trulala (1926) - Lackei
- Vienna - Berlin (1926) - Ein Heurigenfänger
- The Boxer's Bride (1926) - Heinz Gordon
- The Sea Cadet (1926)
- Marie's Soldier (1927)
- The Imaginary Baron (1927) - Hans v. Grabow
- Durchlaucht Radieschen (1927) - Pueblo de Santa Galantos
- The Eighteen Year Old (1927) - Paul Malot
- Students' Love (1927) - Teddy
- Das Fürstenkind (1927) - Trottulos
- The Most Beautiful Legs of Berlin (1927)
- Svengali (1927) - Maler Leard
- Der König der Mittelstürmer (1927) - Mr. Jonas
- Only a Viennese Woman Kisses Like That (1928) - Der Bäcker
- Artists (1928) - Ralph, Milsons Freund
- It Attracted Three Fellows (1928)
- When the Guard Marches (1928)
- Honeymoon (1928)
- Love's Masquerade (1928) - Herr im Auto
- Two Red Roses (1928) - Georg
- Only a Viennese Woman Kisses Like That (1928) - Karl
- Polish Economy (1928) - Windig
- The First Kiss (1928) - Präsident des Anny-Cord-Clubs
- Tales from the Vienna Woods (1928) - Fritz Pampfinger
- Serenissimus and the Last Virgin (1928) - Teddy, Reporter
- The Abduction of the Sabine Women (1928) - Friedrich Wilhelm, Strieses Aeltester
- Nachtgestalten (1929)
- Sinful and Sweet (1929) - Gaston - Willings' Freund
- Inherited Passions (1929)
- Come Back, All Is Forgiven (1929) - Teddy, ihr Sohn
- Im Prater blühen wieder die Bäume (1929) - Johann
- Only on the Rhine (1930) - Houp, Barrymores Bursche
- Two Worlds (1930) - Tschech. Soldat (German Version)
- Two Worlds (1930) - Tschechischer Soldat
- The Singing City (1930) - Heini Ladenburg / Claires Verehrer
- Eine Freundin so goldig wie Du (1930)
- The Big Attraction (1931) - Tommy
- The Theft of the Mona Lisa (1931)
- Children of Fortune (1931)
- Ein süsses Geheimnis (1931) - Johan
- Die Wasserteufel von Hieflau (1932)
- The Four from Bob 13 (1932) - Leopold
- Teilnehmer antwortet nicht (1932) - Police Student
- Today Is the Day (1933)
- Adventures on the Lido (1933) - Evelyn's admirer
- Voices of Spring (1933)
- Her Highness Dances the Waltz (1935)
- Die heimliche Gräfin (1942)
- It's Only Love (1947)
- The Singing House (1947)
- The Heavenly Waltz (1948)
- Lambert Feels Threatened (1949)
