= The Most Beautiful Legs of Berlin =

1927 film

- Scene from a film
- German: Die schönsten Beine von Berlin
- Directed by: Willi Wolff
- Written by: Robert Liebmann; Willi Wolff
- Starring: Ellen Richter; Dina Gralla; Kurt Gerron
- Cinematography: Axel Graatkjær
- Music by: Otto Stenzeel
- Production company: Ellen Richter Film
- Distributed by: UFA
- Release date: 28 July 1927
- Running time: 90 minutes
- Country: Germany
- Languages: Silent; German intertitles

The Most Beautiful Legs of Berlin (German: Die schönsten Beine von Berlin) is a 1927 German silent film directed by Willi Wolff and starring Ellen Richter, Dina Gralla and Kurt Gerron. The film's sets were designed by the art director Ernst Stern. It functions as a revue show, showcasing leading dancers of the Weimar era. Richter and Gralla play rival competitors.

A theme song composed by Walter Kollo was released alongside the film, and became a gramophone hit record.

== Cast ==
- Ellen Richter as Dolorès
- Dina Gralla as Poupette
- Kurt Gerron
- Henry Bender
- Teddy Bill
- Kurt Ehrlich
- Kurt Fuß
- Bruno Kastner
- Rudolf Lettinger
- Kurt Lilien
- Rudolf Meinhard-Jünger
- Frida Richard
- Fritz Richard
- Gyula Szöreghy
- Alice Torning
- Lawrence Tiller Empire Girls
- Charell Boys
- Dodge Sisters
