= Princess Trulala =

1926 German film

- German film poster
- German: Prinzessin Trulala
- Directed by: Erich Schönfelder; Richard Eichberg
- Written by: Hans Sturm
- Produced by: Richard Eichberg
- Starring: Lilian Harvey; Dina Gralla; Harry Halm
- Cinematography: Willy Hameister
- Music by: Hans May
- Production company: Richard Eichberg-Film
- Distributed by: Süd-Film
- Release date: 15 April 1926
- Running time: 83 minutes
- Country: Germany
- Languages: Silent; German intertitles

Princess Trulala (German: Prinzessin Trulala) is a 1926 German silent comedy film directed by Erich Schönfelder and Richard Eichberg and starring Lilian Harvey, Dina Gralla and Harry Halm. It was shot at the Johannisthal Studios in Berlin. The film's sets were designed by art director Kurt Richter. As was common in her silent films, Harvey's heroine has to choose between several different suitors.

== Plot ==
The young and wild Princess Trulala should finally get married! Her chosen one is the young and beautiful Prince Arnulf, whose father of the same name, the old Prince of Leinefeld, rules over a small empire. In order to get to know her groom better, Princess Trulala travels with her sister, Princess Hopsassa, both disguised as waitresses, to the residence of the young prince. The Prince too wants to get to know his bride better, and dresses up as a forester. Of course, as usual for a comedy of confusion of that time, this leads to all sorts of more or less funny misunderstandings.

Since the two waitresses are quite handsome, the village boys in Prince Arnulf's empire are now also beginning to develop interest in Trulala and Hopsassa, which in turn arouses plenty of displeasure among the village beauties of the country. When Trulala and Arnulf got to know each other better, they quickly take a liking to each other and want to escape the whole Tohuwabohu by tearing away to Munich. The old prince promptly leaves, believing that he has to free Arnulf junior from this improper "woman", this waitress. But eventually everything dissolves in pleasure, and Prince Arnulf gives his blessing to his son's marriage to that false "waitress", Princess Trulala. And quite en passé, the old man also finds pleasure in Trulala's sister Hopsassa, whom he finally leads home.

== Cast ==
- Lilian Harvey as Princess Trulala
- Dina Gralla as Princess Hopsassa
- Harry Halm as Prince Arnulf
- Hans Junkermann as Court Marshal
- Teddy Bill as Lackei
- Lucie von Wartberg as Princess Lola
- Eva Schmid-Kayser as Princess Lila
- Leopold von Ledebur as Prince Arnuld von Leinefeld
- Julia Serda as Fürstin
- Emmy Wyda as Tante Eugenie
- Mira Brandt as Gesellschaftsdame
- Hans Sturm as carrier of "The Golden Cross"
- Victor Colani as forester
- Georg Gartz as secretary

== Reception ==
Writing for the Immortal Film Heinrich Fraenkel stated: "For Richard Eichberg, it was agreed that the cinema audience would love nothing more than adventurous princesses who sit on cavalier knees, drink champagne and cause teasing stirs. How much he was right when his theory was proven by the success of the film Princess Trulala".
