= Karl Harbacher =

Austrian actor

Karl Harbacher (1879–1943) was an Austrian actor.

== Selected filmography ==
- Miss Piccolo (1914)
- No Sin on the Alpine Pastures (1915)
- Fanny Elssler (1920)
- Das blaue Duell (1920)
- The Adventuress of Monte Carlo (1921)
- The Dance of Love and Happiness (1921)
- Peter Voss, Thief of Millions (1921)
- Circus People (1922)
- Yvette, the Fashion Princess (1922)
- The Blonde Geisha (1923)
- Old Heidelberg (1923)
- The Woman on the Panther (1923)
- Debit and Credit (1924)
- New Year's Eve (1924)
- By Order of Pompadour (1924)
- The Venus of Montmartre (1925)
- The Old Ballroom (1925)
- The Salesgirl from the Fashion Store (1925)
- Cock of the Roost (1925)
- Oh Those Glorious Old Student Days (1925)
- Struggle for the Soil (1925)
- Golden Boy (1925)
- The Woman with That Certain Something (1925)
- Darling, Count the Cash (1926)
- The Bank Crash of Unter den Linden (1926)
- Annemarie and Her Cavalryman (1926)
- The Bohemian Dancer (1926)
- Maytime (1926)
- The Captain from Koepenick (1926)
- The Circus of Life (1926)
- Nana (1926)
- The Pink Slippers (1927)
- Benno Stehkragen (1927)
- I Stand in the Dark Midnight (1927)
- The Imaginary Baron (1927)
- The Republic of Flappers (1928)
- Cry for Help (1928)
- Mariett Dances Today (1928)
- It Attracted Three Fellows (1928)
- Artists (1928)
- The Girl with the Whip (1929)
- Lux, King of Criminals (1929)
- Big City Children (1929)
- I Lost My Heart on a Bus (1929)
- What's Wrong with Nanette? (1929)
- My Heart is a Jazz Band (1929)
- Yes, Yes, Women Are My Weakness (1929)
- What a Woman Dreams of in Springtime (1929)
- Distinguishing Features (1929)
- Retreat on the Rhine (1930)
- Rag Ball (1930)
- The Cabinet of Doctor Larifari (1930)
- Kohlhiesel's Daughters (1930)
- Without Meyer, No Celebration is Complete (1931)
- Every Woman Has Something (1931)
- Berlin-Alexanderplatz (1931)
- Terror of the Garrison (1931)
- The Night Without Pause (1931)
- The Emperor's Sweetheart (1931)
- Everyone Asks for Erika (1931)
- Spione im Savoy-Hotel (1932)
- Spies at the Savoy Hotel (1932)
- The Roberts Case (1933)
- A Woman With Power of Attorney (1934)
- Paganini (1934)
- Bashful Felix (1934)
- All Because of the Dog (1935)
- The Valiant Navigator (1935)
- Don't Lose Heart, Suzanne! (1935)
- Boccaccio (1936)
- Such Great Foolishness (1937)
- Seven Slaps (1937)
- Woman's Love—Woman's Suffering (1937)
- The Girl with a Good Reputation (1938)
- Men Are That Way (1939)
- The Wedding Trip (1939)
- Her First Experience (1939)
- The Scoundrel (1939)
- The Golden City (1942)
- The Eternal Tone (1943)

== Bibliography ==
- Bach, Steven. Marlene Dietrich: Life and Legend. University of Minnesota Press, 2011.
- Eisner, Lotte H. The Haunted Screen: Expressionism in the German Cinema and the Influence of Max Reinhardt. University of California Press, 2008.
