= Der Ladenprinz =

1928 film directed by Erich Schönfelder

- Directed by: Erich Schönfelder
- Written by: Curt J. Braun
- Based on: Der Ladenprinz oder das Märchen vom Kommis by Kurt Münzer
- Starring: Harry Halm; La Jana; Paul Henckels; Hermine Sterler
- Cinematography: Frederik Fuglsang
- Music by: Werner Schmidt-Boelcke
- Production company: Deutsche Film Union
- Distributed by: Deutsche First National Pictures
- Release date: 21 August 1928
- Country: Germany
- Languages: Silent; German intertitles

Der Ladenprinz (The Shop Prince) is a 1928 German silent film directed by Erich Schönfelder, starring Harry Halm, La Jana and Paul Henckels and also with La Jana, Sig Arno and Hermine Sterler. It was adapted from a novel by Kurt Münzer. The film's art direction was by Andrej Andrejew.

== Cast ==
- Harry Halm as Lucian, the Shop Prince
- La Jana as Princess Tatjana
- Paul Henckels as Martin Flamm
- Hermine Sterler as Rosanna
- Betty Bird as Lucian's cousin
- Adele Sandrock as Tatjana's aunt
- Ralph Arthur Roberts as Berggrün
- Sig Arno as Berggrün's procurer
- Ida Perry as Madame Charlotte
- Carla Bartheel
- Heinrich Gotho
- Emmy Wyda
