= Retreat on the Rhine =

1930 film

- Film poster
- Directed by: Jaap Speyer
- Written by: Alexander Alexander; Josef Mayen
- Starring: Charlotte Susa; Hans Stüwe; Hermann Böttcher
- Cinematography: Friedl Behn-Grund; Franz Planer
- Edited by: Geza Pollatschik
- Music by: William A. Rollins; Walter Sieber; Harry Waldau
- Production company: Delog Film Produktions
- Distributed by: Omnium-Film
- Release date: 1 December 1930
- Running time: 92 minutes
- Country: Germany
- Language: German

Retreat on the Rhine (German: Zapfenstreich am Rhein) is a 1930 German musical comedy film directed by Jaap Speyer and starring Charlotte Susa, Hans Stüwe, and Hermann Böttcher. It was made as an operetta film which emerged as a popular genre following the arrival of sound film.

The film's sets were designed by Walter Reimann.

== Cast ==
- Charlotte Susa as Daisy Corinna, Sängerin
- Hans Stüwe as Oskar Graf von Rastenfeld
- Hermann Böttcher as General von Rastenfeld, Oskars Onkel
- Wolfgang Zilzer as Karl, Oskars Bursche
- Camilla von Hollay as Karoline, Oskars Dienstmädchen
- Hans Junkermann as Der Oberst
- Julia Serda as Frau des Obersts
- Ferry Sikla as Kemp, Weingutsbesitzer
- Josefine Dora as Frau Kemp
- Maria Matray as Dina, Kemps Tochter
- Ernő Verebes as Max Hoffmann, Kapellmeister
- Paul Westermeier as Fritz Böttcher, Unteroffizier
- Else Reval as Maly, Köchin
- Sig Arno as Alfred Lewinsky, Zauberkünstler
- Lieselotte Jacobi as Resi, Zofe bei Kemp
- Bruno Steinwald as Adjutant des Generals
- Siegfried Berisch as 1. Gläubiger
- Karl Harbacher as 2. Gläubiger
- Fritz Richard as 3. Gläubiger

== Bibliography ==
- Waldman, Harry (2008). Nazi Films in America, 1933–1942. Jefferson, NC: McFarland. ISBN 978-0-7864-3861-7.
