= The Abduction of the Sabine Women (1928 film) =

1928 German silent comedy film by Robert Land

- Directed by: Robert Land
- Written by: Robert Liebmann; Franz Schulz
- Based on: Der Raub der Sabinerinnen by Franz von Schönthan and Paul von Schönthan
- Starring: Ralph Arthur Roberts; Ida Wüst; Teddy Bill
- Cinematography: Willy Goldberger
- Production company: Super Film
- Distributed by: Deutsche Lichtspiel-Syndikat
- Release date: 23 November 1928
- Country: Germany
- Languages: Silent; German intertitles

The Abduction of the Sabine Women (German: Der Raub der Sabinerinnen) is a 1928 German silent comedy film directed by Robert Land and starring Ralph Arthur Roberts, Ida Wüst and Teddy Bill. It was based on a play of the same name which had had several film adaptations.

The film's sets were designed by the art director Robert Neppach.

== Cast ==
- Ralph Arthur Roberts as Direktor Striese
- Ida Wüst as Frau Striese
- Teddy Bill as Friedrich Wilhelm, Striese's son
- Renée Kürschner as Fedora Eurydike
- Aribert Wäscher as Professor Gollwitz
- Valeska Stock as Frau Professor Gollwitz
- Maria Paudler as Paula, Gollwitz's daughter
- Illa Meery as Ria, ein Revuegirl
- Paul Otto as Kommerzienrat Groß
- Walter Rilla as Emil Groß, genannt Sterneck, sein Sohn
- Wolfgang Zilzer as Balsamo, Intrigant
- Camilla von Hollay as Rosa, Dienstmädchen bei Gollwitz

== See also ==
- The Abduction of the Sabine Women (1936)
- Romulus and the Sabines (Italy, 1945)
- The Abduction of the Sabine Women (1954)

== Bibliography ==
- Goble, Alan (1999). The Complete Index to Literary Sources in Film. Walter de Gruyter. ISBN 978-3-11-095194-3.
