= Mariett Dances Today =

1928 film

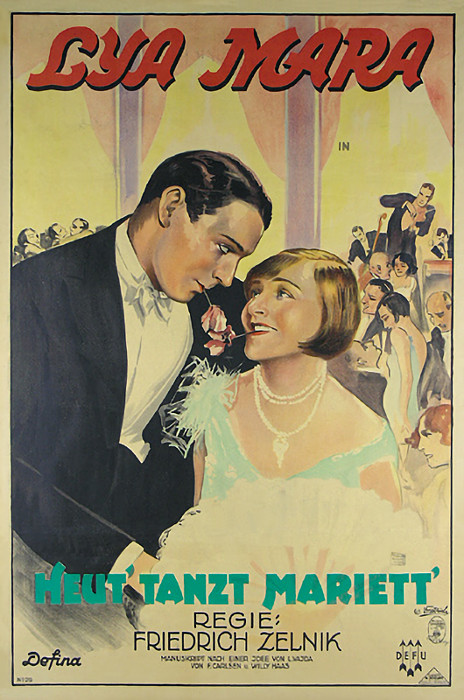
- Directed by: Frederic Zelnik
- Written by: Fanny Carlsen; Willy Haas; Ladislaus Vajda
- Starring: Lya Mara; Fred Louis Lerch; Harry Halm
- Cinematography: Herbert Körner; Arthur Martinelli
- Music by: Walter Ulfig
- Production company: Deutsche Film Union
- Distributed by: Deutsche First National Pictures
- Release date: 15 March 1928
- Running time: 111 minutes
- Country: Germany
- Languages: Silent; German intertitles

Mariett Dances Today (German: Heut tanzt Mariett) is a 1928 German silent romance film directed by Frederic Zelnik and starring Lya Mara, Fred Louis Lerch and Harry Halm. It was shot at the Staaken Studios in Berlin and on location in the Swiss resort of St. Moritz.

It was made by the German subsidiary of First National Pictures. The film's sets were designed by the art directors Andrej Andrejew and Erich Zander.

== Cast ==
- Lya Mara as Mariett
- Fred Louis Lerch as Robert van Dammen
- Harry Halm as Ein junger Maler
- Ralph Arthur Roberts as Prinz Beaufort
- Kurt Gerron as Der Besitzer der Bar, Brigon
- Jakob Tiedtke as Der Bürgermeister
- Sophie Pagay as Die Haushälterin
- Karl Harbacher as Der Schuhmacher
- Josefine Dora as Seine Mutter
- Fritz Kampers
- Ivan Koval-Samborsky
- Adele Sandrock
- Franz Schafheitlin

== Plot summary ==
The story begins like a fairytale: A stork, hunting for food in a Dutch village pond, picks out a baby girl and drops her in the cradle in the mayor's house. The mayor, who is a practical man, connects his saw and the baby's cradle with a string, and with every pull of the saw he rocks little Mariett – which is the name of the tiny foundling – to her sleep.

As the years go by, Mariett grows up to be a merry young woman, albeit a bit naïve, but full of joie de vivre and very fond of dancing. When on her 16th birthday a covert admirer gives her a pair of silk shoes she hurries to the village church to pray to Saint Joseph for a fitting pair of silk stockings. Her prayer, though, is overheard by two affluent young men. The one of them is a painter, copying one of the church windows; he is accompanied by his friend Robert van Dammen. They are very much amused about the girl's simple-mindedness and they plan to hoax her. With her father's consent – who is paid 300 guilder – Mariett is drugged and in her dreams she sees herself as a princess. When she awakes in Robert's palais the men proceed with their hoax, with Robert himself acting as “princess” Mariett's driver. Three days later, however, the fun is over and Mariett is told the truth. She is deeply upset about being had in such a way. So she decides to leave the village to seek her fortune in the big wide world.

She plays her harmonica and dances during her journey. A bar operator, who watches Mariett, is impressed by her and hires her for a show act for his Paris establishment.

Meanwhile the two jokesters have heard about Mariett's racy success. As Robert has fallen in love with her he tries to find the way into her heart, what he undertakes on the skiing slopes and toboggan runs of Saint Moritz. On New Year's Eve Mariett and Robert are reconciled at last.

== Production notes ==
Heut' tanzt Mariett was filmed between 28 November 1927 and 4 February 1928 in Staaken Studios (Berlin) and the location shots were done at Saint Moritz (Switzerland).

On 10 March 1928 the motion picture passed censorship and was first released five days later in Beba-Palast Atrium, Berlin.

The movie was cleared for minors. It consisted of nine acts, the length of the reel being 2783 meters.

== Bibliography ==
- Jill Nelmes & Jule Selbo. Women Screenwriters: An International Guide. Palgrave Macmillan, 2015.
