= Chamber Music (film) =

1925 film directed by Carl Froelich

- Directed by: Carl Froelich
- Written by: Heinrich Ilgenstein (play); Robert Liebmann; Walter Supper
- Produced by: Carl Froelich; Henny Porten; Wilhelm von Kaufmann
- Starring: Henny Porten; Ida Wüst; Harry Halm; Ferdinand von Alten
- Cinematography: Axel Graatkjær
- Music by: Hansheinrich Dransmann
- Production company: Henny Porten-Froelich-Produktion
- Distributed by: Filmhaus Bruckmann
- Release date: 24 March 1925
- Country: Germany
- Languages: Silent; German intertitles

Chamber Music (German: Kammermusik) is a 1925 German silent drama film directed by Carl Froelich and starring Henny Porten, Ida Wüst, Harry Halm, and Ferdinand von Alten.

The film's art direction was by Franz Schroedter.

== Cast ==
- Ida Wüst as Herzogin von Siebenstein
- Harry Halm as Prinz Bernhard, ihr Neffe
- Ferdinand von Alten as Exzellenz von Prillwitz, der Intedant
- Henny Porten as Hilde von Niemeyer
- Jakob Tiedtke as Geheimrat Kügelchen, Hildes Vater
- Livio Pavanelli as Rudi von Niemeyer, Hildes Mann
- Helmuth Henkel as Parsifal, Hildes Sohn
- Erich Bartels

== Bibliography ==
- Grange, William (2008). Cultural Chronicle of the Weimar Republic. Lanham, MD: Scarecrow Press. ISBN 978-0-8108-5967-8.
