= Harry Halm =

German actor

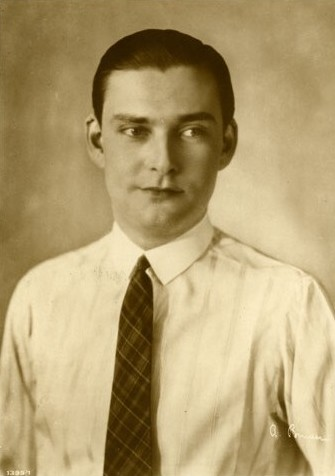
- Harry Halm in 1927
- Born: Harry Hermann Hahn; 17 January 1901; Berlin; German Empire
- Died: 22 November 1980 (aged 79); Munich; West Germany
- Occupation: Actor
- Years active: 1919–1964

Harry Halm (born Harry Hermann Hahn; 17 January 1901 – 22 November 1980) was a German film actor who appeared in numerous films between 1920 and 1955.

He was the son of director Alfred Halm and took acting lessons with Eduard von Winterstein and Hermann Vallentin. He began his stage career in 1919 at the Schauspielhaus in Potsdam. After the Nazis seized power in 1933, the Jewish Harry Halm could not take part in further films until the end of the war.

== Selected filmography ==
- The Gallant King (1920) - Friedrich Augusts Sohn Graf Mority von Sachsen
- Friend Ripp (1923)
- The Evangelist (1924) - Bettelbub
- Strong Winds (1924)
- If Only It Weren't Love (1925)
- Chamber Music (1925) - Prinz Bernhard, ihr Neffe
- The Humble Man and the Chanteuse (1925) - Prinz
- The Fire Dancer (1925)
- Three Waiting Maids (1925) - Emil Kummerbach, Barmixer
- Love and Trumpets (1925) - Leutnant Karl, Edler von Eppenstein
- The Alternative Bride (1925)
- Old Mamsell's Secret (1925) - Harry
- The Untouched Woman (1925) - Lucien, sein Bruder
- Princess Trulala (1926) - Prinz Arnulf
- I Lost My Heart in Heidelberg (1926) - Alex Winkler, Fuchsmajor
- Only a Dancing Girl (1926) - Heinrich Zentler -hans bror, åklagere
- A Sister of Six (1926) - (uncredited)
- It's Easy to Become a Father (1926) - Lord Douglas
- How Do I Marry the Boss? (1927)
- The Queen of the Variety (1927) - Teddy Holl
- Fabulous Lola (1927) - Varietédirektor Bendler
- My Heidelberg, I Can Not Forget You (1927)
- Vacation from Marriage (1927) - Wenzel Strakosch, Violin-Virtuose
- The Serfs (1928) - Alexej Danischeff, ihr Sohn
- Moral (1928) - Erbprinz
- Mariett Dances Today (1928) - Ein junger Maler
- Two Red Roses (1928) - Hans, sein Sohn
- Der Ladenprinz (1928) - Lucian Der Ladenprinz
- Gaunerliebchen (1928) - Robert Goll
- The Blue Mouse (1928) - Caesar Robin
- Her Dark Secret (1929) - Leopold
- The Missing Wife (1929) - Adam Bertram
- The Model from Montparnasse (1929) - Gaston Duprés
- Why Cry at Parting? (1929) - Frank Western, Prokurist von Harder & Co.
- Jenny's Stroll Through Men (1929) - Dr. Frank Dusterberg, der Neffe
- Once You Give Away Your Heart (1929) - Bobby
- Hocuspocus (1930) - Kolbe
- Love's Carnival (1930) - Paul von Ramberg - Oberleutnant
- The Blonde Nightingale (1930) - Dr. Drechsler
- Die Faschingsfee (1931) - Xaver
- The True Jacob (1931) - Fred
- Errant Husbands (1931) - Fritz Ebert
- Sein Scheidungsgrund (1931) - Edi
- At Your Orders, Sergeant (1932)
- Chauffeur Antoinette (1932)
- The Four from Bob 13 (1932) - Oskar
- A Mad Idea (1932) - Bob
- Love Must Be Understood (1933)
- Die Welt dreht sich verkehrt (1947)
- Hin und her (1948) - Finanzminister von Lappalien
- The Imaginary Invalid (1952) - Polizist
- The Forester's Daughter (1952) - Oberhofmeister
- Alraune (1952) - Doktor Mohn
- The White Horse Inn (1952)
- Son of St. Moritz (1954)
- The Royal Waltz (1955) - Zeremoniemeister
- The Daring Swimmer (1957)

== Bibliography ==
- Bergfelder, Tim & Bock, Hans-Michael. The Concise Cinegraph: Encyclopedia of German. Berghahn Books, 2009.
