= Willy Hameister =

German cinematographer

Willy Hameister (3 December 1889 – 13 February 1938) was a German cinematographer.

== Selected filmography ==
- The Plague of Florence (1919)
- The Dance of Death (1919)
- Genuine (1920)
- Christian Wahnschaffe (1920)
- The Night of Queen Isabeau (1920)
- The Cabinet of Dr. Caligari (1920)
- The Island of the Lost (1921)
- Peter the Great (1922)
- Your Valet (1922)
- The Doll Maker of Kiang-Ning (1923)
- Man by the Wayside (1923)
- The Blonde Geisha (1923)
- The Shadow of the Mosque (1923)
- Passion (1925)
- The Girl on the Road (1925)
- Love and Trumpets (1925)
- Princess Trulala (1926)
- Kissing Is No Sin (1926)
- Rinaldo Rinaldini (1927)
- A Serious Case (1927)
- Light Cavalry (1927)
- Carnival Magic (1927)
- The Carousel of Death (1928)
- Tales from the Vienna Woods (1928)
- Charlotte Somewhat Crazy (1928)
- Mikosch Comes In (1928)
- We Stick Together Through Thick and Thin (1929)
- Revolt in the Batchelor's House (1929)
- Police Spy 77 (1930)
- The Woman Without Nerves (1930)
- Susanne Cleans Up (1930)
- Madame Pompadour (1931)
- A Caprice of Pompadour (1931)
- Ash Wednesday (1931)
- Terror of the Garrison (1931)
- Duty Is Duty (1931)
- Without Meyer, No Celebration is Complete (1931)
- Wibbel the Tailor (1931)
- Death Over Shanghai (1932)
- Two Heavenly Blue Eyes (1932)
- At Your Orders, Sergeant (1932)
- Gretel Wins First Prize (1933)
- The Sandwich Girl (1933)
- Heimat am Rhein (1933)
- Girls in White (1936)

== Bibliography ==
- Jung, Uli & Schatzberg, Walter. Beyond Caligari: The Films of Robert Wiene. Berghahn Books, 1999.
