= Tales from the Vienna Woods (1928 film) =

1928 film

- Directed by: Jaap Speyer
- Written by: Rudolph Cartier
- Produced by: Liddy Hegewald
- Starring: Albert Paulig; Magnus Stifter; Eric Barclay
- Cinematography: Willy Hameister
- Production company: Hegewald Film
- Distributed by: Hegewald Film
- Release date: 29 October 1928
- Country: Germany
- Languages: Silent; German intertitles

Tales from the Vienna Woods (German: G'schichten aus dem Wienerwald) is a 1928 German silent film directed by Jaap Speyer and starring Albert Paulig, Magnus Stifter, and Eric Barclay. The title refers to the waltz Tales from the Vienna Woods by Johann Strauss.

The film's sets were designed by Willi Herrmann.

== Cast ==
- Albert Paulig as Erzherzog Albert Paul
- Magnus Stifter as Graf Rüdiger von Wiesberg
- Eric Barclay as Rudi von Wiesberg
- Fritz Schulz as Baron Florian von Seebenstein-Seckendorf
- Yvette Darnys as Baroneß Edith
- Robert Garrison as Dr. Bela Maroszy
- Carla Bartheel as Ilonka
- Albert Kersten as Mario Menardi
- Vera Voronina as Lori Steinmeier
- Sig Arno as Salo Goldblatt
- Teddy Bill as Fritz Pampfinger
- Paul Hörbiger as Alois Guschlbauer
- Walter Karel as Ein Bursche

== Bibliography ==
- Bock, Hans-Michael; Bergfelder, Tim, eds. (2009). The Concise Cinegraph: Encyclopaedia of German Cinema. New York: Berghahn Books. ISBN 978-1-57181-655-9.
