= Neptune Bewitched =

1925 film

- Directed by: Willy Achsel
- Written by: Willy Achsel; Rudolf Presber; Willy Rath
- Starring: Erra Bognar; Julius Falkenstein; Harry Grunwald
- Cinematography: Max Brink; Johannes Männling
- Production company: UFA
- Distributed by: UFA
- Release date: 13 March 1925
- Running time: 82 minutes
- Country: Germany
- Languages: Silent; German intertitles

Neptune Bewitched (German: Der behexte Neptun) is a 1925 German silent comedy film directed by Willy Achsel and starring Erra Bognar, Julius Falkenstein, and Harry Grunwald.

The film's sets were designed by the art director Robert A. Dietrich.

== Cast ==
In alphabetical order

- Erra Bognar as Vicky
- Julius Falkenstein as Ganewsky, ein Finanzoperateur
- Harry Grunwald as Timotheus, genannt Tim / Onkel von Ulrich
- Erik Haffner as Rüstig, Vorsitzender eines Wassersportverbandes
- Paul Heidemann as Ulrich Dircks, ein Sportmäzen
- Willy Kaiser-Heyl as Janssen / Besitzer einer Bootswerft / Vater von Vicky

== Bibliography ==
- Grange, William (2008). Cultural Chronicle of the Weimar Republic. Lanham, MD: Scarecrow Press. ISBN 978-0-8108-5967-8.
