= Willy Rosen =

German-Jewish composer, songwriter, and cabaret player (1894–1944)

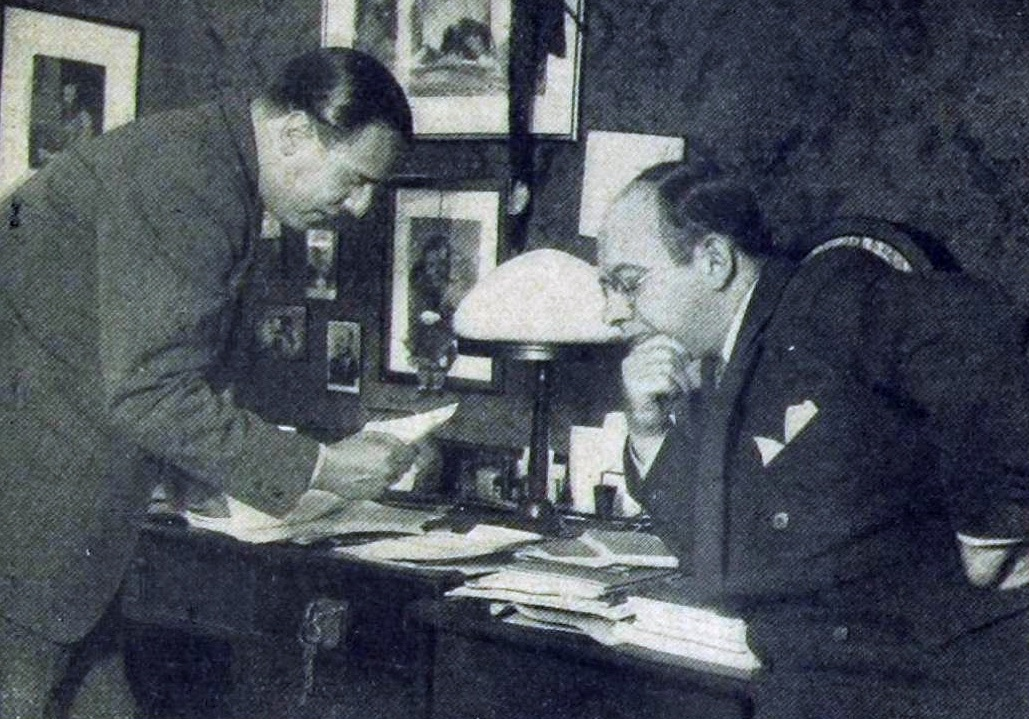
Kurt Schwabach and Willy Rosen (right)

Willy Rosen playing a piano while singing

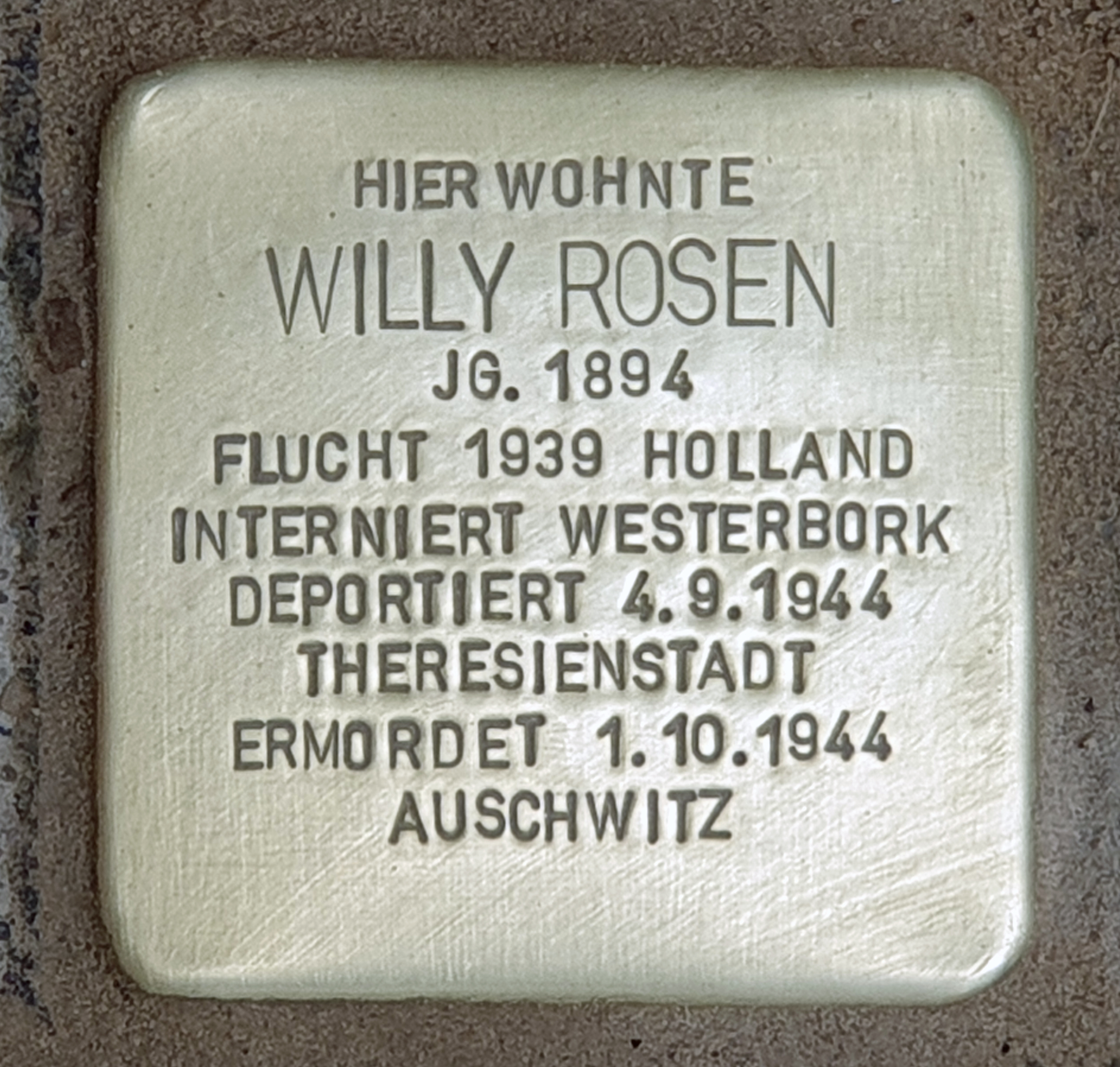
Stolperstein in Berlin-Wilmersdorf

Willy Rosen (1894 – 1 October 1944) was a German-Jewish composer, songwriter, and renowned cabaret player. Rosen was murdered in the Auschwitz concentration camp on 1 October 1944.

Rosen was born Willy Julius Rosenbaum in Magdeburg, Germany. In 1942, Rosen was incarcerated in the Westerbork transit camp, and in 1944, deported to Theresienstadt on 4 September, and then on to the Auschwitz concentration camp on 29 September, where he was murdered.

== Selected filmography ==
- Marriage in Trouble (1929)
- The Tender Relatives (1930)
- Moritz Makes his Fortune (1931)
- Holzapfel Knows Everything (1932)
- Manolescu, Prince of Thieves (1933)

== Sources ==
- Smelik, K. A. D.; Pomerans, Arnold, Etty: The Letters and Diaries of Etty Hillesum, 1941-1943, William B. Eerdmans Publishing Company, 2002. ISBN 978-0-8028-3959-6
- Silverman, Jerry, The Undying Flame: Ballads and Songs of the Holocaust, Syracuse University Press, 2002. ISBN 978-0-8156-0708-3
- Proceedings of the Ninth World Congress of Jewish Studies, Part 4, World Union of Jewish Studies, 1986
