= Two Red Roses =

1928 film

- Directed by: Robert Land
- Written by: Robert Liebmann
- Starring: Liane Haid; Alexander Murski; Harry Halm
- Cinematography: Arthur Martinelli
- Music by: Walter Kollo; Werner Schmidt-Boelcke
- Production company: Deutsche Film Union
- Distributed by: Deutsche First National Pictures
- Release date: 22 April 1929
- Country: Germany
- Languages: Silent; German intertitles

Two Red Roses (German: Zwei rote Rosen) is a 1928 German silent film directed by Robert Land and starring Liane Haid, Alexander Murski, and Harry Halm. The film was released in a sound version in England by First National Pathé. While the sound version has no audible dialog, it was released with a synchronized musical score with sound effects using both the sound-on-disc and sound-on-film process.

The film's art direction was by Andrej Andrejew.

== Cast ==
- Liane Haid as Friedel Schulze
- Alexander Murski as Direktor Eriksen
- Harry Halm as Hans, sein Sohn
- Oskar Marion as Ernst Ritter, Komponist
- Oreste Bilancia as Generaldirektor Bergen
- Trude Hesterberg as Eugenie, seine Frau
- La Jana as Lilli, seine Tochter
- Gyula Szőreghy as Rothe
- Teddy Bill as Georg

== Music ==
The sound version features a theme song entitled “Two Red Roses” by Ralph Stanley (words) and Walter Kollo (music).

== Bibliography ==
- Ken Wlaschin. The Silent Cinema in Song, 1896–1929: An Illustrated History and Catalog of Songs Inspired by the Movies and Stars, with a List of Recordings. McFarland & Company, 2009.
