= The Wife of Forty Years =

1925 film directed by Richard Oswald

- Directed by: Richard Oswald
- Written by: Richard Oswald
- Produced by: Richard Oswald
- Starring: Diana Karenne; Vladimir Gajdarov; Sig Arno; Paul Otto
- Cinematography: Jack Hermann; Theodor Sparkuhl
- Music by: Willy Schmidt-Gentner
- Production company: Richard-Oswald-Produktion
- Release date: 12 April 1925
- Country: Germany
- Languages: Silent; German intertitles

The Wife of Forty Years (German: Die Frau von vierzig Jahren) is a 1925 German silent drama film directed by Richard Oswald and starring Diana Karenne, Vladimir Gajdarov and Sig Arno. The film's art direction was by Paul Leni.

== Cast ==
- Diana Karenne as die Frau
- Vladimir Gajdarov as Er
- Sig Arno as Der Hausfreund
- Paul Otto as Der Mann
- Dina Gralla as die Tochter

== Bibliography ==
- Kasten, Jürgen & Loacker, Armin. Richard Oswald: Kino zwischen Spektakel, Aufklärung und Unterhaltung. Verlag Filmarchiv Austria, 2005.
