= Marie's Soldier =

1927 film directed by Erich Schönfelder

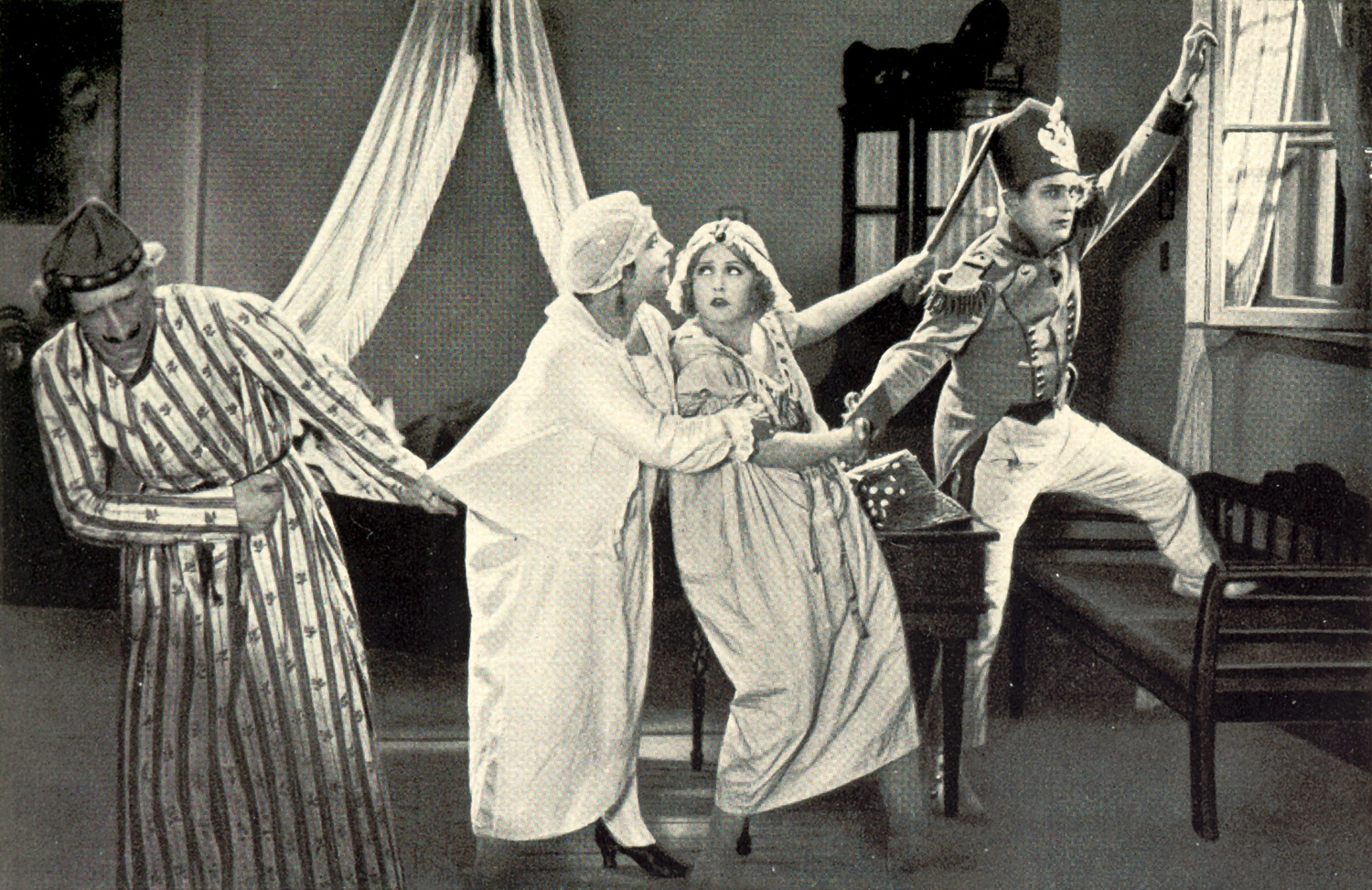
- Scene from a film
- German: Der Soldat der Marie
- Directed by: Erich Schönfelder
- Written by: Leo Birinski
- Produced by: Richard Eichberg
- Starring: Xenia Desni; Harry Liedtke; Grit Haid
- Cinematography: Theodor Sparkuhl
- Music by: Leo Ascher
- Production company: Richard Eichberg-Film
- Distributed by: UFA
- Release date: 14 February 1927
- Running time: 84 minutes
- Country: Germany
- Languages: Silent; German intertitles

Marie's Soldier (German: Der Soldat der Marie) is a 1927 German silent drama film directed by Erich Schönfelder and starring Xenia Desni, Harry Liedtke and Grit Haid. It was shot at the Johannisthal Studios and the backlot of the Babelsberg Studios in Berlin. The film's art direction was by Kurt Richter. The film is based on Leo Ascher's 1913 operetta of the same name.

== Cast ==
- Xenia Desni as Marie
- Harry Liedtke as Imperial Count von Kerzendorf
- Grit Haid as Marianne
- Hilde Maroff as Mariette
- Margarete Kupfer as widow
- Julia Serda as Princess Wendisch-Bommerdorf
- Sig Arno as Marie's father
- Hans Albers as Wonneberger, batman
- Kurt Gerron as Knöppke, Wachtmeister
- Emmy Wyda as Knöppke's wife
- Else Reval as Knöppke's wife's sister
- Hermann Picha as inn keeper
- Teddy Bill as a miller's servant
