= Josefine Dora =

Austrian actress (1867–1944)

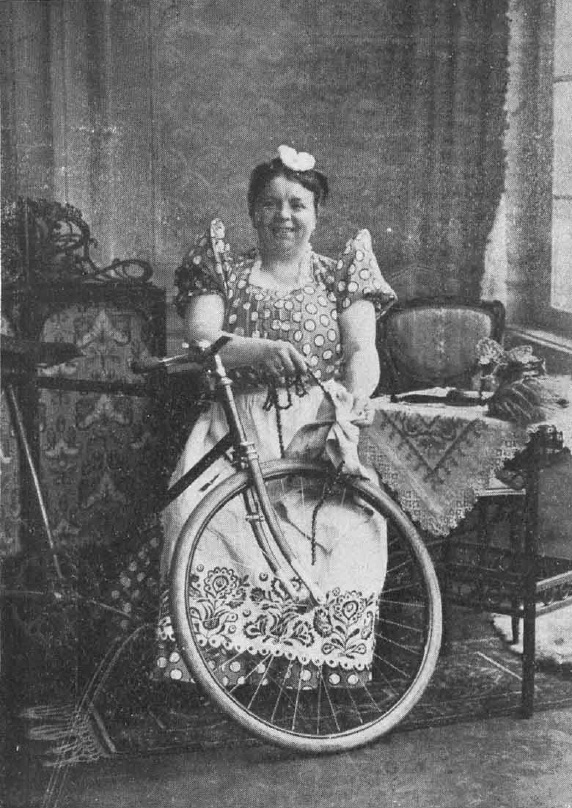
- Born: Isidora Emilie Friese; 13 November 1867; Vienna, Austro-Hungarian Empire
- Died: 28 May 1944 (aged 76); Kühlungsborn, Nazi Germany
- Occupations: Film actress Stage actress
- Years active: 1913–1944 (film)

Josefine Dora (born Isidora Emilie Friese; 13 November 1867 – 28 May 1944) was an Austrian stage and film actress. She appeared in over 100 films, generally in supporting roles such as in The Virtuous Sinner (1931).

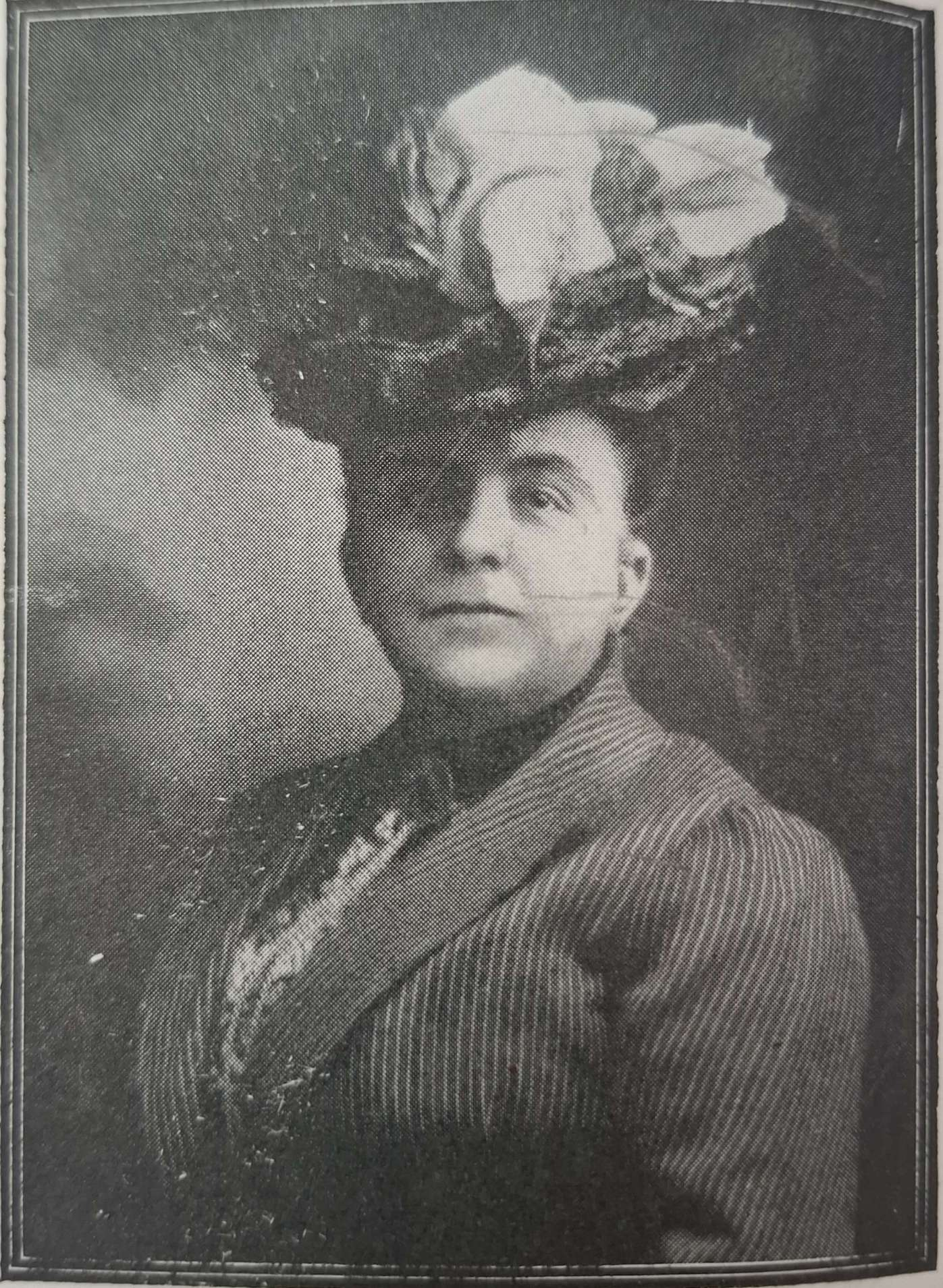
Photo of Josefine Dora as seen in the Black and White Budget, 8 December 1900.

== Selected filmography ==
- The Doll (1919)
- Romeo and Juliet in the Snow (1920)
- The Law of the Desert (1920)
- Rebel Liesel (1920)
- The Clan (1920)
- The Brothers Karamazov (1921)
- The Stranger from Alster Street (1921)
- The Three Aunts (1921)
- The Flight into Death (1921)
- Trix, the Romance of a Millionairess (1921)
- The Game with Women (1922)
- The Flight into Marriage (1922)
- Shadows of the Past (1922)
- Lumpaci the Vagabond (1922)
- Friedrich Schiller (1923)
- The Game of Love (1924)
- Express Train of Love (1925)
- Ballettratten (1925)
- The Circus Princess (1925)
- The False Prince (1927)
- The Love of Jeanne Ney (1927)
- Mariett Dances Today (1928)
- Lemke's Widow (1928)
- Mikosch Comes In (1928)
- The Beaver Coat (1928)
- Mischievous Miss (1930)
- Cyanide (1930)
- Pension Schöller (1930)
- Retreat on the Rhine (1930)
- The Virtuous Sinner (1931)
- The Trunks of Mr. O.F. (1931)
- Gretel Wins First Prize (1933)
- A Woman With Power of Attorney (1934)
- Last Stop (1935)
- If It Were Not for Music (1935)
- Artist Love (1935)
- Marriage Strike (1935)
- Don't Lose Heart, Suzanne! (1935)
- Streak of Steel (1935)
- The Hour of Temptation (1936)
- Love's Awakening (1936)
- Court Theatre (1936)
- The Cabbie's Song (1936)
- Doctor Engel (1936)
- Love Can Lie (1937)
- The Chief Witness (1937)
- Crooks in Tails (1937)
- The Secret Lie (1938)
- The Deruga Case (1938)
- Frau Sixta (1938)
- Woman at the Wheel (1939)
- Mistake of the Heart (1939)
- A Hopeless Case (1939)
- Three Fathers for Anna (1939)
- Alarm at Station III (1939)
- The Right to Love (1939)
- The Scoundrel (1939)
- Our Miss Doctor (1940)
- Annelie (1941)
- The Way to Freedom (1941)
- Clarissa (1941)
- Goodbye, Franziska (1941)
- Mask in Blue (1943)
- A Flea in Her Ear (1943)
- My Summer Companion (1943)
- Music in Salzburg (1944)

== Bibliography ==
- Prawer, S.S. Between Two Worlds: The Jewish Presence in German and Austrian Film, 1910-1933. Berghahn Books, 2005.
