= Werner Schmidt-Boelcke =

German composer

- Born: 28 July 1903; Rostock, German Empire
- Died: 5 November 1985 (aged 82); Munich, Bavaria, West Germany
- Occupation: Composer
- Years active: 1924-1951 (Film)

Werner Schmidt-Boelcke (1903–1985) was a German composer of film scores. He emerged during the silent era, producing music to accompany the films in cinemas. He enjoyed particular success during the Weimar Republic. From the 1950s he worked largely in West German television.

== Selected filmography ==
- The Shop Prince (1928)
- Mary Lou (1928)
- Pawns of Passion (1928)
- Snowshoe Bandits (1928)
- Spy of Madame Pompadour (1928)
- Two Red Roses (1928)
- Love in the Cowshed (1928)
- Anesthesia (1929)
- Cagliostro (1929)
- Come Back, All Is Forgiven (1929)
- Column X (1929)
- The Chaste Coquette (1929)
- The Living Corpse (1929)
- Left of the Isar, Right of the Spree (1929)
- It's You I Have Loved (1929)
- Katharina Knie (1929)
- Poison Gas (1929)
- Tragedy of Youth (1929)
- Revolt in the Batchelor's House (1929)
- Ship in Distress (1929)
- Love and Champagne (1930)
- Oh Those Glorious Old Student Days (1930)
- Only on the Rhine (1930)
- Pension Schöller (1930)
- In the Employ of the Secret Service (1931)
- My Heart Incognito (1931)
- The Yellow House of Rio (1931)
- Yorck (1931)
- Cavaliers of the Kurfürstendamm (1932)
- Theodor Körner (1932)
- Johannisnacht (1933)
- The Lake Calls (1933)
- Two Good Comrades (1933)
- You Are Adorable, Rosmarie (1934)
- The Man in the Saddle (1945)
- Peter Voss, Thief of Millions (1946)
- Glück muß man haben (1950)
- In München steht ein Hofbräuhaus (1951)

== Bibliography ==
- Jung, Uli & Schatzberg, Walter. Beyond Caligari: The Films of Robert Wiene. Berghahn Books, 1999.
