= Willy Achsel =

German filmmaker

- Born: 25 July 1884; Berlin, German Empire
- Died: 7 September 1955; Berlin, Germany
- Occupations: Director, Writer
- Years active: 1919–1937 (film)

Willy Achsel (1884–1955) was a German screenwriter and film director.

== Selected filmography ==
- Your Valet (1922)
- Neptune Bewitched (1925)
- The Sandwich Girl (1933)

== Bibliography ==
- Grange, William (2008). Cultural Chronicle of the Weimar Republic. Lanham, MD: Scarecrow Press. ISBN 978-0-8108-5967-8.
