= The Sandwich Girl =

1933 film directed by Carl Boese

- Directed by: Carl Boese
- Written by: Willy Achsel; Walter Schlee; Walter Wassermann
- Produced by: Gustav Althoff
- Starring: Lucie Englisch; Jakob Tiedtke; Else Reval
- Cinematography: Willy Hameister
- Edited by: Hilde Grebner
- Music by: Gustav Althoff
- Production company: Aco-Film
- Release date: 21 July 1933
- Country: Germany
- Language: German

The Sandwich Girl (German: Die kalte Mamsell) is a 1933 German comedy film directed by Carl Boese and starring Lucie Englisch, Jakob Tiedtke, and Else Reval.

The film's sets were designed by the art directors Artur Gunther and Willi Herrmann.

== Cast ==
- Lucie Englisch as Lucie Ohnesorge
- Jakob Tiedtke as Knoll
- Else Reval as Frau Knoll
- Kurt Vespermann as Harry Knoll
- Julius Falkenstein as Bangmann
- Margarete Kupfer as Frau Bangmann
- Georgia Lind as Else Bangmann
- Willy Clever as Peter Wiedmann, Sportlehrer
- Gustl Gstettenbaur as Paul, Lehrling
- Armand Rommel as Der Prokurist
- Olga Engl as Frau Ohnesorge, Lucies Mutter

== Bibliography ==
- Waldman, Harry (2008). Nazi Films in America, 1933–1942. Jefferson, NC: McFarland. ISBN 978-0-7864-3861-7.
