= The Four from Bob 13 =

1932 film directed by Johannes Guter

- Directed by: Johannes Guter
- Written by: Curt J. Braun
- Produced by: Jacob Brodsky
- Starring: Gretl Theimer; Werner Fuetterer; Peter Voß
- Cinematography: Georg Krause; Ewald Sudrow
- Edited by: Conrad von Molo
- Music by: Giuseppe Becce; Will Meisel
- Production company: Gnom-Tonfilm
- Distributed by: Union-Film
- Release date: 9 April 1932
- Running time: 100 minutes
- Country: Germany
- Language: German

The Four from Bob 13 (German: Die Vier vom Bob 13) is a 1932 German sports comedy film directed by Johannes Guter and starring Gretl Theimer, Werner Fuetterer and Peter Voß. It was shot at the Halensee Studios in Berlin. The film's sets were designed by the art directors Emil Hasler and Otto Hunte. It was made as a Multiple-language version, with a separate version, L'amour en vitesse, produced in French.

== Synopsis ==
In a winter sports resort in the Alps, four friends are part of a bobsleigh team known as Bob 13. While there for a competition, they encounter the attractive Mary.

== Cast ==
- Gretl Theimer as Mary
- Werner Fuetterer as Treß
- Peter Voß as Baron Plessow
- Michael von Newlinsky as Richard
- Hans Junkermann as Kapitän Garden
- Willy Stettner as Fritz
- Harry Halm as Oskar
- Fritz Rasp as Schmidt
- Marcel Merminod as Plessows Diener
- Teddy Bill as Leopold
- Toni Schmidt as Bergführer
- Franz Schmidt as Bergführer
- Elisabeth Pinajeff

== Bibliography ==
- Bock, Hans-Michael & Bergfelder, Tim. The Concise CineGraph. Encyclopedia of German Cinema. Berghahn Books, 2009.
- Isensee, Eyke Das Justiz-Bild im Spielfilm der NS-Zeit. Büchner-Verlag, 2018.
- Rège, Philippe. Encyclopedia of French Film Directors, Volume 1. Scarecrow Press, 2009.
