= The Love Express =

1931 film directed by Robert Wiene

- Directed by: Robert Wiene
- Written by: Alexander Engel; Ladislaus Vajda; Andor Zsoldos
- Produced by: Herman Millakowsky
- Starring: Georg Alexander; Dina Gralla; Joseph Schmidt; Angelo Ferrari
- Cinematography: Carl Drews
- Music by: Max Niederberger
- Production company: Emelka Studios
- Distributed by: Bavaria Film
- Release date: 30 January 1931
- Running time: 85 minutes
- Country: Germany
- Language: German

The Love Express (German: Der Liebesexpreß) is a 1931 German musical comedy film directed by Robert Wiene and starring Georg Alexander, Dina Gralla and Joseph Schmidt. No print of the film is known to survive, and it is therefore a lost film. It is based on the operetta Es lebe die Liebe by Alexander Engel and Wilhelm Sterk. It was one of a cycle of operetta films made during the early sound era. A French-language version, Venetian Nights (Nuits de Venise), also directed by Wiene, was released the same year.

It is sometimes known by the alternative title of Eight Days of Happiness. It was made at the Bavaria Studios in Munich. The film's sets were designed by the art director Ludwig Reiber.

== Cast ==
- Georg Alexander as Kurt Weidingen
- Dina Gralla as Annie
- Joseph Schmidt as Enrico Tonelli, Sänger
- Angelo Ferrari as Conte Orsino
- Karl Graumann as Williams - Kurts Diener
- Therese Giehse as Frau Mayer
- Wilhelm Marx as Der Alt
- Harry Hertzsch as Fritz - dessen Freund
- Elise Aulinger as Annies Hausfrau

== Bibliography ==
- Jung, Uli; Schatzberg, Walter (1999). Beyond Caligari: The Films of Robert Wiene. Berghahn Books. ISBN 978-1-57181-156-1.
