= The Secret of the Red Cat (1931 film) =

1931 film directed by Erich Schönfelder

- Directed by: Erich Schönfelder
- Written by: Arnold Lippschitz; Karl Wilczynski
- Produced by: Erich Engels
- Starring: Rosa Valetti; Hans Junkermann; Margot Landa
- Cinematography: Bruno Mondi
- Edited by: Willy Zeunert
- Music by: Franz Grothe
- Production company: Deutsche Tonfilm Produktions
- Distributed by: Erich Engels-Film
- Release date: 22 May 1931
- Running time: 87 minutes
- Country: Germany
- Language: German

The Secret of the Red Cat (German: Das Geheimnis der roten Katze) is a 1931 German comedy crime film directed by Erich Schönfelder and starring Rosa Valetti, Hans Junkermann and Margot Landa. It was shot at the Grunewald Studios in Berlin and on location around the city. The film's sets were designed by the art directors Willi Herrmann and Herbert Lippschitz. It was remade as a 1949 film of the same title starring Heinz Rühmann.

== Synopsis ==
The shady Red Cat nightclub is visited by American millionaire Tobias Jefferson and his daughter Jessie. He has just acquired the famous and very valuable Halifax Diamond which attracts the interest of various regulars at the nightspot. With the help of André Dupont, Jessie is ultimately able to prevent the theft of the diamond.

== Cast ==
- Rosa Valetti as Laura Jefferson
- Hans Junkermann as Tobias Jefferson, ein reicher Amerikaner
- Margot Landa as Jessie Jefferson
- Ernö Verebes as André Dupont, Schauspieler
- Sig Arno as Moustache - ein Apache
- Paul Westermeier as Pitou - Apache
- Kurt Lilien as Pim - ein Gefängniswärter
- Heidi Eisler as Eine Apachin
- Gerhard Dammann as Catelain - Wirt der 'Roten Katze'
- Else Reval as Sängerin

== Bibliography ==
- Klaus, Ulrich J. Deutsche Tonfilme: Jahrgang 1931. Klaus-Archiv, 2006.
- Limbacher, James L. Haven't I seen you somewhere before?: Remakes, sequels, and series in motion pictures and television, 1896-1978. Pierian Press, 1979.
- Schöning, Jörg. Die deutsche Filmkomödie vor 1945: Kaiserreich, Weimarer Republik und Nationalsozialismus. Cinegraph, 2004.
