= The Big Attraction =

1931 film

- Directed by: Max Reichmann
- Written by: Curt J. Braun; Anton Kuhl; Richard Schneider-Edenkoben
- Produced by: Hans Naundorf; Richard Tauber
- Starring: Richard Tauber; Margo Lion; Marianne Winkelstern
- Cinematography: Franz Koch; Gotthardt Wolf
- Edited by: Geza Pollatschik
- Music by: Nicholas Brodszky; Franz Grothe; Walter Jurmann; Bronislau Kaper
- Production company: Münchner Lichtspielkunst
- Distributed by: Bavaria Film
- Release date: 23 April 1931
- Running time: 87 minutes
- Country: Germany
- Language: German

The Big Attraction (German: Die große Attraktion) is a 1931 German musical film directed by Max Reichmann and starring Richard Tauber, Margo Lion, and Marianne Winkelstern. It was made by Bavaria Film at the Emelka Studios near Munich. The film's sets were designed by the art director Hans Jacoby.

== Cast ==
- Richard Tauber as Riccardo
- Margo Lion as Juana
- Marianne Winkelstern as Kitty
- Ivan Koval-Samborsky as Fredo
- Sig Arno as Felipe
- Teddy Bill as Tommy
- Bruno Arno
- Hans Brausewetter
- Lucie Englisch
- Oskar Sima
- Maria Elsner

== Bibliography ==
- Waldman, Harry (2008). Nazi Films in America, 1933–1942. Jefferson, NC: McFarland. ISBN 978-0-7864-3861-7.
