= Venetian Nights (film) =

1931 film

- Directed by: Pierre Billon; Robert Wiene
- Written by: Alexander Engel; Ladislaus Vajda; Andor Zsoldos
- Starring: Janine Guise; Germaine Noizet; Roger Tréville
- Music by: Max Niederberger
- Production company: Greenbaum Film
- Release date: January 1931
- Country: Germany
- Language: French

Venetian Nights (French: Nuits de Venise) is a 1931 German French-language operetta film directed by Pierre Billon and Robert Wiene and starring [anine Guise, Germaine Noizet and Roger Tréville. It was an alternative-language version of the 1931 film The Love Express, made at the Emelka Studios in Munich.

== Synopsis ==
After winning a cash prize in a contest, a young woman decides to visit Venice. She hires a secretary, a wealthy young man in disguise, to accompany her on the holiday. Once in Italy she attracts several suitors but her real love is her secretary. When she discovers he has deceived her, she returns to Berlin on the express and he pursues her to try and declare his love.

== Cast ==
- Janine Guise
- Germaine Noizet
- Roger Tréville
- Florelle
- Lucien Callamand
- Max Maxudian as Le baron étranger
- Pierre Nay
- E. Danelli

== Bibliography ==
- Jung, Uli & Schatzberg, Walter. Beyond Caligari: The Films of Robert Wiene. Berghahn Books, 1999.
