= Such a Greyhound =

1931 film

- Directed by: Carl Heinz Wolff
- Written by: Arthur Hoffmann (play); Curt Kraatz; Walter Schlee; Walter Wassermann
- Starring: Ralph Arthur Roberts; Max Adalbert; Lucie Englisch
- Cinematography: Alfred Hansen; Georg Muschner
- Music by: Austin Egen; Bert Reisfeld; Felix Günther
- Production company: Carl Heinz Wolff-Filmproduktion
- Distributed by: Metropol-Filmverleih
- Release date: 1 October 1931
- Running time: 94 minutes
- Country: Germany
- Language: German

Such a Greyhound (German: So'n Windhund) is a 1931 German musical comedy film directed by Carl Heinz Wolff and starring Ralph Arthur Roberts, Max Adalbert, and Lucie Englisch. It was shot at the Babelsberg Studios in Berlin.

== Cast ==
- Ralph Arthur Roberts as Dr. Egon Winternitz
- Max Adalbert as Dittmar
- Lucie Englisch as Elli
- Johannes Riemann as Ferber
- Maria Elsner as Nina Noir
- Henry Bender as Gesenius
- Max Schipper as Stöger
- Hansi Arnstaedt as Frau des Bauunternehmers
- Annie Ann as Vera
- Eva Schmid-Kayser as Otti
- Heinz Sarnow as Amtmann Werner
- Kurt Fuß as Oberpräsident
- Hermann Picha as Oberkellner vom 'Schwarzen Roß'

== Bibliography ==
- Klaus, Ulrich J. Deutsche Tonfilme: Jahrgang 1931. Klaus-Archiv, 2006.
- Krautz, Alfred (1984). International Directory of Cinematographers, Set- and Costume Designers in Film. Vol. 4. Munich: Saur. ISBN 978-3-598-21434-9.
