= Shooting Festival in Schilda =

1931 film

- Directed by: Adolf Trotz
- Written by: Alexander Alexander; Willy Prager
- Starring: Sig Arno; Fritz Kampers; Eugen Rex
- Cinematography: Frederik Fuglsang
- Edited by: Paul May
- Production company: Gottschalk Tonfilm
- Distributed by: Union-Film; Werner Film
- Release date: 19 October 1931
- Running time: 85 minutes
- Country: Germany
- Language: German

Shooting Festival in Schilda (German: Schützenfest in Schilda) is a 1931 German comedy film directed by Adolf Trotz and starring Sig Arno, Fritz Kampers and Eugen Rex. It was shot at the Halensee Studios in Berlin.

== Cast ==
- Sig Arno
- Fritz Kampers
- Eugen Rex
- Hans Wassmann
- Ida Wüst
- Margot Landa
- Genia Nikolaieva
- Evi Eva
- Betty Astor
- Nastia Latka
- Julius Falkenstein
- Willy Prager
- Johannes Roth

== Bibliography ==
- Bock, Hans-Michael & Bergfelder, Tim. The Concise CineGraph. Encyclopedia of German Cinema. Berghahn Books, 2009.
- Klaus, Ulrich J. Deutsche Tonfilme: Jahrgang 1931. Klaus-Archiv, 2006.
