= Without Meyer, No Celebration is Complete =

1931 film directed by Carl Boese

- Directed by: Carl Boese
- Written by: Curt J. Braun; Fritz Falkenstein
- Produced by: Gustav Althoff
- Starring: Sig Arno; Ralph Arthur Roberts; Dina Gralla; Adele Sandrock
- Cinematography: Hans Karl Gottschalk; Willy Hameister
- Edited by: Hilde Grebner
- Music by: Artur Guttmann
- Production company: Aco-Film
- Distributed by: Albö-Film
- Release date: 27 October 1931
- Running time: 84 minutes
- Country: Germany
- Language: German

Without Meyer, No Celebration is Complete (German: Keine Feier ohne Meyer) is a 1931 German comedy film directed by Carl Boese and starring Sig Arno, Ralph Arthur Roberts and Dina Gralla. Boese made a number of films featuring Jewish comedians during the Weimar Era.

== Synopsis ==
Meyer, an ambitious young Jewish man, tries to pass himself off as a successful business tycoon in order to marry into an upper-class family. He has persuaded the girl's father of his suitability but the daughter is reluctant to marry him because she is in love with another man named Walter. Unaware of this, Meyer advises Walter to elope with his secret girlfriend, without realising he is sabotaging his own dream of marrying her. In the end Meyer happily settles down with his secretary who has always loved him.

== Cast ==
- Sig Arno as Sigmund Meyer
- Ralph Arthur Roberts as Town Councilman Goebel
- Dina Gralla as Elsa Goebel
- Adele Sandrock as Mother Goebel
- Maly Delschaft as Miss Krauss
- Lucie Englisch as Steno
- Kurt Vespermann as Walter, Elsa's Fiancé
- Gaston Briese as Widower
- Herbert Kiper as Unhappy Husband
- Käte Lenz as Unhappy Wife
- Gerhard Dammann as A Director
- Eugen Neufeld as A Director
- Siegfried Berisch as Husband
- Else Reval as Wife
- Hermann Krehan as Registrar
- Albert Karchow
- Ernst Behmer
- Karl Harbacher

== Bibliography ==
- Prawer, S.S. Between Two Worlds: The Jewish Presence in German and Austrian Film, 1910-1933. Berghahn Books, 2005.
