= Ralph Arthur Roberts =

German actor

- Ralph Arthur Roberts in The Buddenbrooks (1923)
- Born: Robert Arthur Schönherr; 2 October 1884; Meerane, Saxony, German Empire
- Died: 12 March 1940 (aged 55); Berlin, Germany
- Occupations: Film actor, director, playwright, lyricist
- Years active: 1919–1940 (film); 1903– (stage)

Ralph Arthur Roberts (born Robert Arthur Schönherr; 2 October 1884 – 12 March 1940) was a German film actor who also directed in the theatre and occasionally in film and wrote plays. From 1928 on, he headed the Berlin Theatre in Behrenstraße.

== Life and career ==
He was born in Meerane as Robert Arthur Schönherr to Carl Robert Schönherr, a baker, and Berta Elisabeth (née König). He grew up in Dresden, where he was already performing as an extra at the Albert-Theater while still in gymnasium and then studied acting with Adolf Winds and composition at the conservatoire. He made his professional début in 1903 at the Residenztheater in Wiesbaden, and had temporary engagements at the Trianon Theatre in Berlin and the Schauspielhaus in Breslau. In 1907 or earlier, he moved to Hamburg, where in 1909 he became a member of the company at the Thalia Theatre.

After service as an officer in World War I, Roberts returned to the Thalia, where he directed plays in addition to acting. In 1921 he became head of the Komödienhaus in Berlin, and in 1928 he opened his own theatre in Behrenstraße, where he premiėred several comic works of his own. Initially he played tragicomic rôles, frequently in operettas; in 1922, he co-starred with Fritzi Massary in the première of Leo Fall's Madame Pompadour. However, after that he concentrated on light comedy on the stage.

In addition, he played several supporting rôles in films. Wearing a monocle was part of his image, and in film he generally played men of substance: directors and industrialists. He is remembered especially for his tendency to portray characters as more or less eccentric, which rose to ironic self-commentary in rôles such as the public prosecutor in Der Maulkorb (in which according to his relative and biographer Hansjoachim Schönherr he proved himself "one of the best character actors of his generation") and King Charles X of France in Dance on the Volcano.

Roberts also wrote lyrics for songs, which were used for the 1954 film On the Reeperbahn at Half Past Midnight featuring Hans Albers and Heinz Rühmann. In particular, he wrote both the lyrics and the music for the title waltz, originally for a 1912 revue of his at the Thalia, Bunt ist die Welt, and also prominently featured in the film Große Freiheit Nr. 7 from 1944.

He died in Berlin on 12 March 1940, before the première of his last film, Wie konntest Du, Veronika!, from oyster poisoning, and was buried at the Protestant Stahnsdorf South-Western Cemetery in Stahnsdorf.

== Filmography ==
=== Actor ===
- 1919: Der Tod und die Liebe
- 1919: Erdgift
- Parisian Women (1921)
- Insulted and Humiliated (1922)
- King of Women (1923)
- The Buddenbrooks (1923)
- Lord Reginald's Derby Ride (1924)
- The Flower Girl of Potsdam Square (1925)
- The Elegant Bunch (1925)
- Die dritte Eskadron (1926)
- My Aunt, Your Aunt (1927)
- The Tragedy of a Lost Soul (1927)
- Moral (1927)
- Ein rheinisches Mädchen beim rheinischen Wein (1927)
- A Serious Case (1927)
- Break-in (1927)
- 1927/28: Aus dem Elternhaus vertrieben
- The Beaver Coat (1928)
- Mariett Dances Today (1928)
- Lotte (1928)
- Prince or Clown (1928)
- Der Ladenprinz (1928)
- The Abduction of the Sabine Women (1928)
- The Crazy Countess (1928)
- Mary's Big Secret (1928)
- 1929: Anschluß um Mitternacht
- Zwei Krawatten (1930)
- Police Spy 77 (1930)
- Burglars (1930)
- Twice Married (1930)
- Rendezvous (1930)
- Die zärtlichen Verwandten (1930)
- 1930: Terra-Melophon-Magazin Nr. 1
- Ihre Majestät die Liebe (1931)
- Caught in the Act (1931)
- The True Jacob (1931)
- Everyone Asks for Erika (1931)
- The Spanish Fly (1931)
- 1931: Zu Befehl, Herr Unteroffizier
- 1931: Gesangverein Sorgenfrei
- The Firm Gets Married (1931)
- The Unfaithful Eckehart (1931)
- Hooray, It's a Boy! (1931)
- Such a Greyhound (1931)
- Duty Is Duty (1931)
- Keine Feier ohne Meyer (1931)
- A Night in Paradise (1932)
- 1931/32: Der schönste Mann im Staate
- The Cheeky Devil (1932)
- At Your Orders, Sergeant (1932)
- Distorting at the Resort (1932)
- 1932/33: Die Unschuld vom Lande
- 1932/33: Meine Frau - seine Frau
- A Song for You (1933)
- 1933: Es gibt nur eine Liebe
- 1933: Es war einmal ein Musikus
- There Is Only One Love (1933)
- 1933/34: Schön ist es, verliebt zu sein
- 1933/34: Ein Mädel mit Tempo / Es tut sich was um Mitternacht
- Adventure on the Southern Express (1934)
- Gypsy Blood (1934)
- 1934: Da stimmt was nicht
- 1934: Der Schrecken vom Heidekrug
- 1934: Meine Frau, die Schützenkönigin
- 1934: Frau Eva wird mondain!
- The Daring Swimmer (1934)
- 1934: Seine beste Erfindung
- 1934: Alte Kameraden
- Punks Arrives from America (1935)
- 1935: Hilde Petersen postlagernd
- 1935: Mach’ mich glücklich
- 1935: Der interessante Fall
- 1935/36: Soldaten - Kameraden
- 1935/36: Engel mit kleinen Fehlern
- Make Me Happy (1935)
- The Mysterious Mister X (1936)
- 1936: Der verkannte Lebemann
- 1936/37: Meine Frau, die Perle
- 1937: Wenn Du eine Schwiegermutter hast
- 1937: Husaren, heraus!
- 1937: Heiratsinstitut Ida & Co
- 1937: Mädchen für alles
- The Muzzle (1938)
- Es leuchten die Sterne (1938)
- 1938: Diskretion - Ehrensache
- Dance on the Volcano (1938)
- My Aunt, Your Aunt (1939) (also co-scripted)
- 1939: Das Glück wohnt nebenan
- Marriage in Small Doses (1939)
- 1939/40: Polterabend
- My Daughter Doesn't Do That (1940)
- 1940: Wie konntest Du, Veronika! (also idea)

=== Direction and scriptwriting ===
- 1934: Playing with Fire (Director, co-scripted)
- 1939: Meine Tante – Deine Tante (Co-scripted, also actor)
- 1949/50: Sie sind nicht mehr (Assistant director)
- 1957/58: Das gab's nur einmal (Assistant director)

=== Lyrics and music ===
- 1954: Auf der Reeperbahn nachts um halb eins (Lyrics, music)
