= Hans Junkermann (actor) =

German actor (1872–1943)

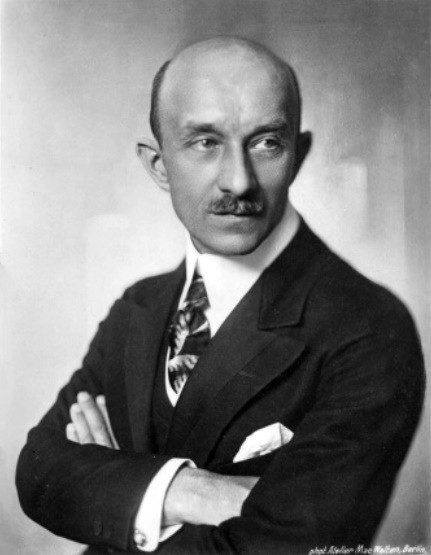
- Junkermann ca. 1920
- Born: 24 February 1872; Stuttgart, German Empire
- Died: 12 June 1943 (aged 64); Berlin, Nazi Germany
- Resting place: Friedhof Heerstraße, Berlin
- Occupation: Actor
- Years active: 1892–1943
- Spouse: Julia Serda (m.1911)

Hans Ferdinand Junkermann (24 February 1872 – 12 June 1943) was a German actor. He was married to the Austrian actress Julia Serda.

== Selected filmography ==
- Where Is Coletti? (1913)
- The Seeds of Life (1918)
- The Girl from Acker Street (1920)
- The Love Affairs of Hector Dalmore (1921)
- Hamlet (1921)
- Hazard (1921)
- The Eternal Struggle (1921)
- Playing with Fire (1921)
- Lola Montez, the King's Dancer (1922)
- Miss Rockefeller Is Filming (1922)
- Maciste and the Silver King's Daughter (1922)
- The Girl with the Mask (1922)
- The Flight into Marriage (1922)
- The Lady and Her Hairdresser (1922)
- The Woman on the Panther (1923)
- Das Milliardensouper (1923)
- Nanon (1924)
- The Stolen Professor (1924)
- Darling of the King (1924)
- The Great Unknown (1924)
- Dancing Mad (1925)
- The Girl with a Patron (1925)
- Express Train of Love (1925)
- The Salesgirl from the Fashion Store (1925)
- Love and Trumpets (1925)
- The Girl on the Road (1925)
- Women of Luxury (1925)
- The Adventure of Mr. Philip Collins (1925)
- The Farmer from Texas (1925)
- The Old Ballroom (1925)
- Grandstand for General Staff (1926)
- Annemarie and Her Cavalryman (1926)
- People to Each Other (1926)
- Princess Trulala (1926)
- The Princess of the Riviera (1926)
- Chaste Susanne (1926)
- The Blue Danube (1926)
- The Mistress (1927)
- His Late Excellency (1927)
- The Prince of Pappenheim (1927)
- Fabulous Lola (1927)
- The Orlov (1927)
- Serenissimus and the Last Virgin (1928)
- The Beloved of His Highness (1928)
- Darling of the Dragoons (1928)
- It Attracted Three Fellows (1928)
- Parisiennes (1928)
- Marriage (1928)
- Love's Masquerade (1928)
- Love in May (1928)
- Scampolo (1928)
- Mikosch Comes In (1928)
- The Story of a Little Parisian (1928)
- The Man with the Frog (1929)
- What's Wrong with Nanette? (1929)
- My Sister and I (1929)
- The Black Domino (1929)
- Sinful and Sweet (1929)
- The Circus Princess (1929)
- Waltz of Love (1930)
- The Love Waltz (1930)
- The Corvette Captain (1930)
- Him or Me (1930)
- Delicatessen (1930)
- Retreat on the Rhine (1930)
- Anna Christie (1931)
- Shadows of the Underworld (1931)
- The Secret of the Red Cat (1931)
- Ash Wednesday (1931)
- The Battle of Bademunde (1931)
- Johann Strauss (1931)
- Die Fledermaus (1931)
- The Countess of Monte Cristo (1932)
- Mamsell Nitouche (1932)
- Overnight Sensation (1932)
- No Money Needed (1932)
- The Four from Bob 13 (1932)
- The Dancer of Sanssouci (1932)
- The Little Crook (1933)
- The Flower of Hawaii (1933)
- Wedding at Lake Wolfgang (1933)
- A Song for You (1933)
- The Page from the Dalmasse Hotel (1933)
- The Csardas Princess (1934)
- Music in the Blood (1934)
- Roses from the South (1934)
- Just Once a Great Lady (1934)
- The Last Waltz (1934)
- A Woman Who Knows What She Wants (1934)
- The Young Count (1935)
- Winter Night's Dream (1935)
- Regine (1935)
- The King's Prisoner (1935)
- Peter, Paul and Nanette (1935)
- My Life for Maria Isabella (1935)
- Girls in White (1936)
- A Wedding Dream (1936)
- A Woman of No Importance (1936)
- The Divine Jetta (1937)
- Serenade (1937)
- The Man Who Was Sherlock Holmes (1937)
- Adventure in Love (1938)
- The Impossible Mister Pitt (1938)
- Woman at the Wheel (1939)
- Ursula Under Suspicion (1939)
- The Scoundrel (1939)
- Madame Butterfly (1939)
- Target in the Clouds (1939)
- Small Town Poet (1940)
- Passion (1940)
- Bismarck (1940)
- Bismarck's Dismissal (1942)
- Bravo Acrobat! (1943)
- An Old Heart Becomes Young Again (1943)
