= Emmy Wyda =

German actress (1876–1942)

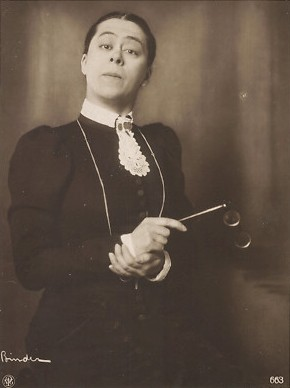
- Born: Emmy Wiede; 2 March 1876; Danzig, German Empire
- Died: 22 January 1942 (aged 65); Berlin, Nazi Germany
- Occupation: Actress
- Years active: 1913–1941

Emmy Wyda (2 March 1876 – 22 January 1942) was a German actress. She appeared in more than eighty films from 1913 to 1941.

== Selected filmography ==
Year	Title	Role	Notes
1936	The Call of the Jungle		
1935	If It Were Not for Music		
1935	The Man with the Paw		
1934	Hearts are Trumps		
1932	Distorting at the Resort		
1932	The Mad Bomberg		
1932	Spies at the Savoy Hotel		
1932	Cavaliers of the Kurfürstendamm		
1930	Die zärtlichen Verwandten		
1930	Mischievous Miss		
1930	Rooms to Let		
1929	The Gypsy Chief		
1929	Miss Midshipman		
1928	Polish Economy		
1928	The Woman from Till 12		
1928	The Girl from the Revue		
1928	Der Ladenprinz		
1928	Sixteen Daughters and No Father		
1927	Marie's Soldier		
1927	Linden Lady on the Rhine		
1927	The Pink Slippers		
1927	Small Town Sinners		
1926	Princess Trulala		
1925	The Farmer from Texas		
1924	The Last Laugh		
1922	Die Gezeichneten		
1922	Die Gezeichneten		
1921	The Kwannon of Okadera		
1921	The Rats		
1921	Lotte Lore		
1921	Father Won't Allow It		
1919	Veritas Vincit		
1916	Dorrit's Pleasure Trip		
1915	No Sin on the Alpine Pastures		
