= Willy Prager =

German actor (1877-1956)

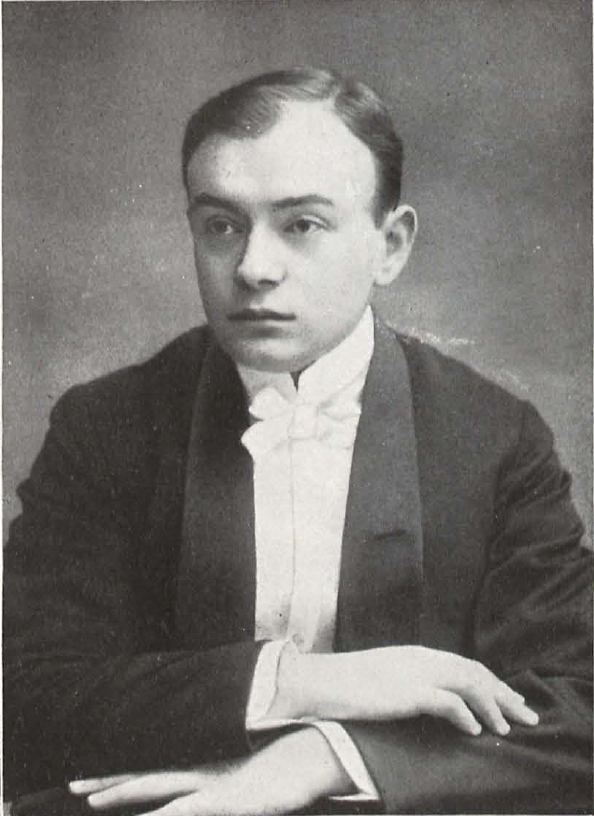
- Prager in 1906
- Born: 23 May 1877; Kattowitz, German Empire
- Died: 4 March 1956 (aged 78); Berlin-Halensee, West Germany
- Other names: Willi Prager
- Occupation(s): Actor, director, Kabarett performer, librettist and screenwriter
- Years active: 1898–1955

Willy Prager (23 May 1877 – 4 March 1956) was a German actor, writer and Kabarett performer.

== Filmography ==
Year	Title	Role	Notes
1913	Die Insel der Seligen	Heftiger Vater / Triton	
1919	Der Saal der sieben Sünden	Teng-Tsu	
1920	Kohlhiesels Töchter	Der Handelsmann	
1920	The Eyes of the World	Henrik van Derp	
1923	Old Heidelberg		
1926	The Young Man from the Ragtrade		
1930	Waltz of Love		
1930	Delicatessen	Conférencier	
1930	The Cabinet of Doctor Larifari	Patient	
1930	Darling of the Gods	Maurus Colwyn	
1931	Moritz Makes his Fortune	Max Meier	
1931	The Yellow House of Rio	Theaterdirektor	
1931	Shooting Festival in Schilda		
1931	A Night at the Grand Hotel	Lorbeer	
1931	The Night Without Pause		
1932	Aus einer kleinen Residenz	Offermann	
1947	Marriage in the Shadows	Dr. Louis Silbermann	
1948	Beate	Paul Demuth	
1948	Morituri	Vater Simon	
1950	Schicksal am Berg		
1950	Heart of Stone	Armer Bauer	(final film role)

== Bibliography ==
- Jelavich, Peter. Berlin Cabaret. Harvard University Press, 1996.
