= Dina Gralla =

German actress (1905–1994)

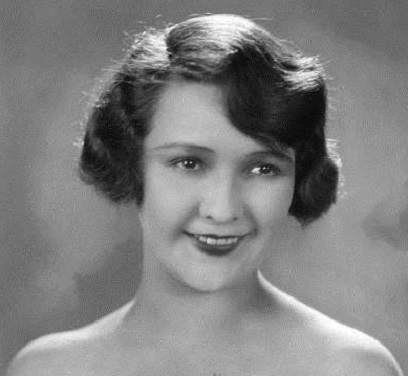
- Born: Hedwig Gralla; 15 January 1905; Berlin, German Empire
- Died: 11 November 1994 (aged 89); Berlin, Germany
- Other names: Dina Sventen; Dina Sönten
- Occupation: Actress
- Years active: 1925–1954

Dina Gralla (born Hedwig Gralla; 15 January 1905 – 11 November 1994) was a German film actress.

Gralla was born Hedwig Gralla in Berlin to German parents. She received dance training in 1919 and performed as a ballet dancer at the revues at the Berlin Wintergarten theatre. After taking private acting lessons from Walter Steinbeck, director Richard Eichberg cast her in his 1925 drama film Leidenschaft before appearing in a number of silent films and into the sound era of the early 1930s. Due to illness she had to stop her acting career in 1934. The only exception was her appearance with a small part in the 1954 Erik Ode directed drama Ten on Every Finger (1954).

Gralla was married twice: first to the American journalist Lincoln Eyre, who was the Berlin correspondent of The New York Times, and from 1934 to 1939 to the German journalist Clemens Dieckmann.

== Selected filmography ==
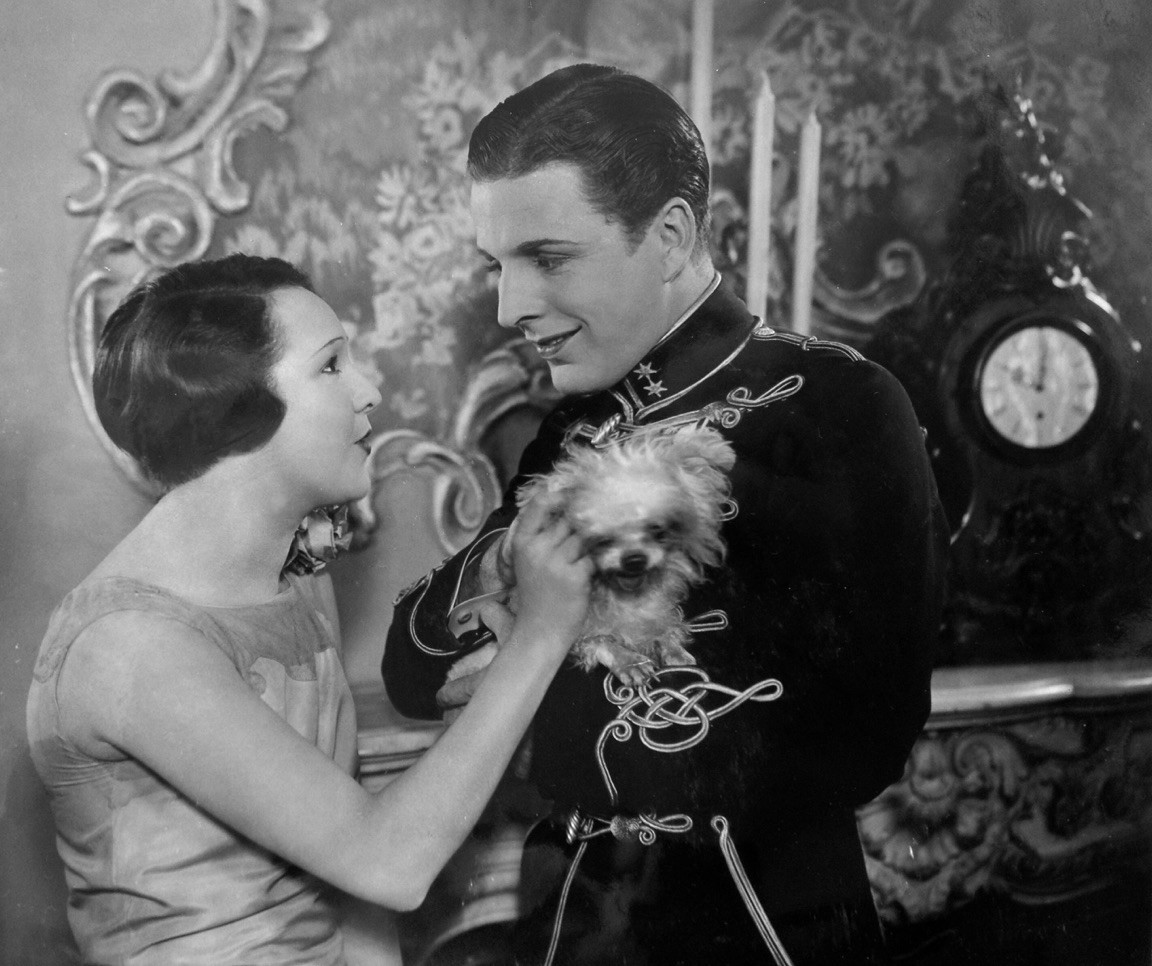
Gralla and Werner Pittschau in the 1926 film Der Balletterzherzog (aka Virtue)

- The Wife of Forty Years (1925)
- The Girl on the Road (1925)
- Passion (1925)
- The Woman with That Certain Something (1925)
- Princess Trulala (1926)
- Our Daily Bread (1926)
- Virtue (1926)
- Madame Wants No Children (1926)
- The Prince of Pappenheim (1927)
- The Most Beautiful Legs of Berlin (1927)
- Schweik in Civilian Life (1927)
- How Do I Marry the Boss? (1927)
- Im Luxuszug (1927)
- The Page Boy at the Golden Lion (1928)
- The Woman from Till 12 (1928)
- The Old Fritz (1928)
- Come Back, All Is Forgiven (1929)
- Mischievous Miss (1930)
- The Love Express (1931)
- Without Meyer, No Celebration is Complete (1931)
- The Soaring Maiden (1931)
- Children of Fortune (1931)
- An Auto and No Money (1932)
- Ten on Every Finger (1954)

== Bibliography ==
- Jung, Uli & Schatzberg, Walter. Beyond Caligari: The Films of Robert Wiene. Berghahn Books, 1999.

== Biography ==
- Kay Weniger: Das große Personenlexikon des Films. Dritter Band F – H. Barry Fitzgerald – Ernst Hofbauer, Schwarzkopf & Schwarzkopf Verlag, Berlin 2001, ISBN 3-89602-340-3, pp. 353.
