= Else Reval =

German actress (1893–1978)

- Born: 14 June 1893; Berlin, German Empire
- Died: 25 January 1978 (aged 84); West Berlin, West Germany
- Occupation: Actress
- Years active: 1919–1966 (film & TV)

Else Reval (14 June 1893 – 25 January 1978) was a German film actress.

== Selected filmography ==
- War in Peace (1925)
- The World Wants To Be Deceived (1926)
- Marriage Announcement (1926)
- The Eleven Schill Officers (1926)
- Marie's Soldier (1927)
- How Do I Marry the Boss? (1927)
- The Bordello in Rio (1927)
- The False Prince (1927)
- Bigamy (1927)
- Because I Love You (1928)
- Der Herzensphotograph (1928)
- Who Invented Divorce? (1928)
- You Walk So Softly (1928)
- Escape from Hell (1928)
- Sixteen Daughters and No Father (1928)
- Dear Homeland (1929)
- The Lord of the Tax Office (1929)
- Come Back, All Is Forgiven (1929)
- Pension Schöller (1930)
- The Cabinet of Doctor Larifari (1930)
- Mischievous Miss (1930)
- Retreat on the Rhine (1930)
- Marriage in Name Only (1930)
- By a Nose (1931)
- Without Meyer, No Celebration is Complete (1931)
- Student Life in Merry Springtime (1931)
- The Secret of the Red Cat (1931)
- When the Soldiers (1931)
- The Testament of Cornelius Gulden (1932)
- The Tsar's Diamond (1932)
- Scandal in Budapest (1933)
- The Sandwich Girl (1933)
- Bashful Felix (1934)
- The Daring Swimmer (1934)
- Holiday From Myself (1934)
- Variety (1935)
- City of Anatol (1936)
- The Cabbie's Song (1936)
- The Merry Wives (1936)
- Street Music (1936)
- Orders Are Orders (1936)
- Diamonds (1937)
- His Best Friend (1937)
- Red Orchids (1938)
- Between the Parents (1938)
- What Now, Sibylle? (1938)
- Storms in May (1938)
- A Woman Like You (1938)
- In the Name of the People (1939)
- The Star of Rio (1940)
- Wedding in Barenhof (1942)
- My Friend Josephine (1942)
- A Salzburg Comedy (1943)
- When the Young Wine Blossoms (1943)
- Tell the Truth (1946)
- Don't Dream, Annette (1949)
- Don't Play with Love (1949)
- Miracles Still Happen (1951)
- The Heath Is Green (1951)
- At the Well in Front of the Gate (1952)
- The Day Before the Wedding (1952)
- When the Heath Dreams at Night (1952)
- Holiday From Myself (1952)
- Mailman Mueller (1953)
- Hooray, It's a Boy! (1953)
- The Private Secretary (1953)
- Lady's Choice (1953)
- We'll Talk About Love Later (1953)
- On the Reeperbahn at Half Past Midnight (1954)
- Emil and the Detectives (1954)
- The Captain and His Hero (1955)
- My Sixteen Sons (1956)

== Bibliography ==
- Giesen, Rolf. Nazi Propaganda Films: A History and Filmography. McFarland, 2003.
