= Parufamet =

Parufamet was the name of a distribution company established by the American film studios Paramount Pictures, Metro-Goldwyn-Mayer and the German UFA GmbH in 1925.

The company's founding was part of a loan contract between the studios. Paramount and MGM had loaned $4 Million to UFA, which was in a severe financial crisis, in December 1925; in return, UFA had to produce 40 films per year and reserve 75 percent of the capacities of its foreign cinemas for productions by the American partners. Paramount and MGM agreed to screen UFA productions in their cinema chains, but in reality, only a few UFA productions were ever shown in the US, while at the same time, were being blocked from wide distribution on the domestic market.

In 1927, the conditions of the contract were revised, the production of UFA films was reduced from 40 to 20 per year, and the share of Paramount and MGM productions screened in UFA's cinemas reduced from 75 to 33 percent. In 1932, the contract was dissolved.
