= Erich Schönfelder =

German screenwriter (1885–1933)

- Born: 23 April 1885; Frankfurt am Main, German Empire
- Died: 14 May 1933 (aged 48); Berlin, Germany
- Occupations: Actor, Screenwriter, Film Director
- Years active: 1916–1932

Erich Schönfelder (1885 – 1933) was a German screenwriter, actor, and film director of the silent and early sound eras. Early in his career he worked frequently with Ernst Lubitsch.

== Selected filmography ==
=== Writer ===
- Shoe Palace Pinkus (1916)
- When Four Do the Same (1917)
- My Wife, the Movie Star (1919)
- Meyer from Berlin (1919)
- Love at the Wheel (1921)

=== Actor ===
- The Golem and the Dancing Girl (1917)
- The Toboggan Cavalier (1918)
- Ruth's Two Husbands (1919)
- Hunted Men (1924)
- Struggle for the Soil (1925)
- Fight of the Tertia (1929)
- The Copper (1930)

=== Director ===
- The Bull of Olivera (1921)
- Miss Rockefeller Is Filming (1922)
- In the Name of the King (1924)
- Women of Luxury (1925)
- The Woman with That Certain Something (1925)
- Princess Trulala (1926)
- Grandstand for General Staff (1926)
- Marie's Soldier (1927)
- How Do I Marry the Boss? (1927)
- The Woman from Till 12 (1928)
- Der Ladenprinz (1928)
- The Beaver Coat (1928)
- From a Bachelor's Diary (1929)
- Come Back, All Is Forgiven (1929)
- Busy Girls (1930)
- Next, Please! (1930)
- Mischievous Miss (1930)
- A Crafty Youth (1931)
- The Secret of the Red Cat (1931)
- Contest (1932)
- At Your Orders, Sergeant (1932)

== Bibliography ==
- Hake, Sabine Passions and Deceptions: The Early Films of Ernst Lubitsch. Princeton University Press, 1992.
- Prawer, S.S. Between Two Worlds: Jewish Presences in German and Austrian Film, 1910-1933. Berghahn Books, 2007.
