= Sig Arno =

German-Jewish film actor

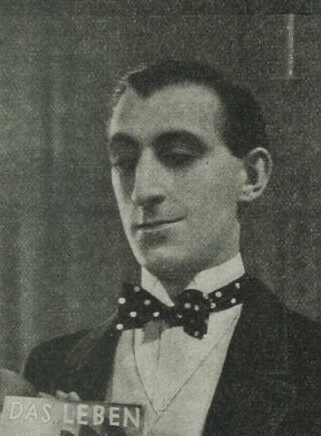
- Born: Siegfried Aron; 27 December 1895; Hamburg, German Empire
- Died: August 17, 1975 (aged 79); Woodland Hills, California, U.S.
- Occupations: Stage and film actor
- Years active: c. 1915–1962
- Spouses: Caroline Dahms (m. 1923; div. 1932) Barbara Kirsanoff (m. 1934; div. 1953) Kitty Mattern (m. 1954; div. 1970) Caroline Dahms (m. 1971)

Sig Arno (born Siegfried Aron; 27 December 1895 – 17 August 1975) was a German-Jewish film actor who appeared in such films as Pardon My Sarong and The Mummy's Hand. He may be best remembered from The Palm Beach Story (1942) as Toto, the nonsense-talking, mustachioed man who hopelessly pursues Mary Astor's Princess Centimillia.

== Biography ==
Arno was born in Hamburg, Germany. Before starting out in films in 1920, he was well-known in Germany as a stage comedian. He acted in 90 films in Germany – including G.W. Pabst's Pandora's Box with Louise Brooks – playing primarily comic roles, then he left Germany in 1933 due to the rise of Adolf Hitler. He worked in Europe until 1939 when he moved to Hollywood.

During the next 20 years he appeared in over 50 films, often playing waiters, maitre d's and "funny Europeans". Arno appeared three times on Broadway, notably in the musical Song of Norway and the play Time Remembered by Jean Anouilh, for which he was nominated for a Tony Award as Best Featured Actor in a Play in 1958. In 1966, Arno won an honorary award at the German Film Awards "for his continued outstanding individual contributions to German film over the years."

== Personal life ==
Arno was also a successful portrait painter. He was married four times:

- Caroline (Lia) Dahms (1923–1932, ended in divorce, one child: Peter Paul * 1926)
- Barbara Kirsanoff (1934–1953, ended in divorce)
- Kitty Mattern (1953–1970, ended in divorce)
- Caroline Dahms (1971; ended with his death)

== Death ==
He died from Parkinson's disease in Woodland Hills, California on August 17, 1975, aged 79.

== Partial filmography ==
- The Wife of Forty Years (1925)
- Cock of the Roost (1925)
- Upstairs and Downstairs (1925)
- A Woman for 24 Hours (1925)
- Manon Lescaut (1926)
- The Third Squadron (1926)
- The Pride of the Company (1926)
- Circus Romanelli (1926)
- The Uncle from the Provinces (1926)
- Annemarie and Her Cavalryman (1926)
- We'll Meet Again in the Heimat (1926)
- The Armoured Vault (1926)
- Darling, Count the Cash (1926)
- Nanette Makes Everything (1926)
- The Son of Hannibal (1926)
- The Love of Jeanne Ney (1927)
- The Man with the Counterfeit Money (1927)
- The Transformation of Dr. Bessel (1927)
- The Eighteen Year Old (1927)
- When the Young Wine Blossoms (1927)
- Family Gathering in the House of Prellstein (1927)
- Lützow's Wild Hunt (1927)
- A Serious Case (1927)
- The Villa in Tiergarten Park (1927)
- Marie's Soldier (1927)
- Always Be True and Faithful (1927)
- Serenissimus and the Last Virgin (1928)
- One Plus One Equals Three (1927)
- Der Ladenprinz (1928)
- Immorality (1928)
- Prince or Clown (1928)
- Tragedy at the Royal Circus (1928)
- The Orchid Dancer (1928)
- Tales from the Vienna Woods (1928)
- The Lady and the Chauffeur (1928)
- Looping the Loop (1928)
- Modern Pirates (1928)
- Her Dark Secret (1929)
- Beyond the Street (1929)
- The Girl with the Whip (1929)
- Revolt in the Batchelor's House (1929)
- We Stick Together Through Thick and Thin (1929)
- Diary of a Lost Girl (1930)
- Vienna, City of Song (1930)
- Retreat on the Rhine (1930)
- The Caviar Princess (1930)
- Fairground People (1930)
- The Widow's Ball (1930)
- By a Nose (1931)
- Schubert's Dream of Spring (1931)
- Moritz Makes His Fortune (1931)
- Shooting Festival in Schilda (1931)
- The Secret of the Red Cat (1931)
- The Night Without Pause (1931)
- A Crafty Youth (1931)
- Checkmate (1931)
- The Big Attraction (1931)
- Without Meyer, No Celebration is Complete (1931)
- Wild Cattle (1934)
- The Hunchback of Notre Dame (1939) as Tailor
- The Mummy's Hand (1940)
- Dark Streets of Cairo (1940)
- A Little Bit of Heaven (1940)
- This Thing Called Love (1940)
- The Great Awakening (1941)
- Gambling Daughters (1941)
- Two Latins from Manhattan (1941)
- Two Yanks in Trinidad (1942)
- Tales of Manhattan (1942)
- The Devil with Hitler (1942 short)
- The Palm Beach Story (1942)
- Juke Box Jenny (1942)
- His Butler's Sister (1943)
- Song of the Open Road (1944)
- The Captain from Köpenick (completed in 1941, released in 1945)
- Duchess of Idaho (1950)
