= The Forester's Daughter (1962 film) =

1962 film

- Directed by: Franz Josef Gottlieb
- Written by: Bernhard Buchbinder (operetta); Georg Jarno (operetta); Fritz Böttger; Janne Furch
- Produced by: Willy Schöne; Klaus Stapenhorst
- Starring: Sabine Sinjen; Peter Weck; Gerlinde Locker
- Cinematography: Dieter Wedekind
- Music by: Georg Jarno
- Production company: Carlton-Film
- Distributed by: Constantin Film
- Release date: 21 December 1962
- Running time: 104 minutes
- Country: West Germany
- Language: German

The Forester's Daughter (German: Die Försterchristel) is a 1962 West German historical musical film directed by Franz Josef Gottlieb and starring Sabine Sinjen, Peter Weck and Gerlinde Locker. It was one of four film versions of the 1907 operetta Die Försterchristl.

It was made at the Bavaria Studios in Munich.

== Cast ==
- Sabine Sinjen as Christel, gen. Försterchristel
- Peter Weck as Kaiser Franz Joseph
- Georg Thomalla as Simmerl, Flickschneider
- Gerlinde Locker as Ilona
- Sieghardt Rupp as Franz Földessy aka Rittmeister Franz Koltai
- Doris Kirchner as Gräfin Elisabeth Paalen
- Rudolf Vogel as Oberhofmeister
- Wolf Albach-Retty as Graf Paalen
- Oskar Sima as Leisinger, Geheimpolizist
- Ernst Waldbrunn as Wirt
- Raoul Retzer as Hütl
- Edith Schultze-Westrum
- Horst Naumann as Hauptmann Toni Felsinger
- Hans Habietinek

== Bibliography ==
- Thomas Elsaesser & Michael Wedel. The BFI companion to German cinema. British Film Institute, 1999.
