= Karlweis =

Karlweis is a surname. Notable people with the surname include:

- Carl Karlweis (1850–1901), Austrian dramatist and short story writer
- Oskar Karlweis (1894–1956), Austrian-American actor
