= Die Försterchristl =

1907 operetta in three acts by Georg Jarno

Die Försterchristl (also Die Försterchristel) is an operetta in three acts by Georg Jarno to a libretto by Bernhard Buchbinder. It premiered on 17 December 1907 at the Theater in der Josefstadt in Vienna. Three years later, its English version by librettist Leonard Liebling had a run of 64 performances at Broadway's Herald Square Theatre in 1910/11 under the title The Girl and the Kaiser. The work is known in English as The Girl and the Kaiser, The Bohemian Dancer, The Forester's Daughter and in French as La petite amie de sa majesté and Christelle et l'empereur.

== Roles ==
- Kaiser Joseph II
- Graf Kolonitzky, Adjutant general
- Graf Gottfried von Leuben, Majordomo
- von Reutern, Chamberlain
- Baronesse Agathe von Othegraven, Lady-in-waiting
- Count Sternfeld, Captain
- Kontesse Josephine, his sister
- Franz Földessy, Steward to Sternfeld (tenor)
- Hans Lange, forester
- Christine, his daughter (soubrette)
- Peter Walperl (buffo)
- Minka, gypsy
- Ladies and gentlemen of the court, gendarmes, guards, footmen, citizens and peasants, gypsy musicians

== Plot ==
Time and place: At the Hungarian border and in Vienna, 1764

In short: The title character (Christine) impulsively falls in love with a handsome stranger, never suspecting that the man is really the Austrian emperor Joseph II. Upon learning the emperor's true identity, Christine pleads with him to save her former boyfriend, rebel leader Franz Földessy, from the firing squad.

=== Act 1 ===
Forest clearing in front of the forester's house

Christine meets a stranger who hunted without permission in the forest. She admonishes him and takes his watch as a security for a fine. She also tells him freely what she thinks of the Emperor and his court in Vienna.

Franz Földessy is in love with Christine and asks her father, the forester Hans Lange, for her hand. Peter Walperl, who is also in love with her, reveals in his jealousy that Franz is a deserter. Franz admits that he once hit an officer who seduced his sister and therefore had to flee the army. Christine decides to go to the court in Vienna and ask the Emperor to pardon Franz.

=== Act 2 ===
Hall in the castle in Vienna

At the court, Christine meets the same stranger again whom she admonished for hunting without permission. He promises to arrange an audience with the Emperor. At that audience, she realises that the stranger is in fact the Emperor. He grants the pardon for Franz, and Christine loses her heart to him. When she meets Franz again, she is cold and rebuffs him, but she is overjoyed and blissful when the Emperor asks her for a dance at the court ball.

=== Act 3 ===
Room in the forester's house

Back at home, Christine continues to reject Franz. To remove the source of substantial gossip, the Emperor arrives and explains that he is not allowed to follow his own heart. He suggests that she marry Franz, whom he made Head Forester, and gives her a ring as a present when he leaves. Christine overcomes her disappointment; she transforms the experience into a precious dream and marries Franz Földessy.

== Notable arias ==
- Herr Kaiser, Herr Kaiser, du liebe Majestät (Waltz)
- Steht ein Mädel auf der Puszta (Csárdás)
- Ich tu nur bös, bin sonst fidel (Waltz)
- Will ich einen Liebsten haben (Waltz)
- Ein Mädel ohne jeden Fehl (Waltz)
- Gebt mir die Geigen der ganzen Welt (Waltz)
- Ein ganz gewöhnlich Schneiderlein
- Mädchen vom Zigeunerstamme

== Film adaptations ==
The Bohemian Dancer (1926)

The operetta has been turned into films on four occasions:

- The Bohemian Dancer, a 1926 silent German film directed by Frederic Zelnik, with Lya Mara, Harry Liedtke and William Dieterle
- The Forester's Daughter, a 1931 film, also by Zelnik, with Irene Eisinger, Paul Richter, Oskar Karlweis and Adele Sandrock
- The Forester's Daughter, a 1952 West German film directed by Arthur Maria Rabenalt, with Johanna Matz, Will Quadflieg, Karl Schönböck and Käthe von Nagy
- The Forester's Daughter, a 1962 West German film directed by Franz Josef Gottlieb, with Sabine Sinjen, Peter Weck and Georg Thomalla

== Bibliography ==
- Vernik-Eibl, Sabine (2011). Leben und Werk der Komponisten Georg Jarno und Leo Ascher (PDF) (Dr. phil.) (in German). University of Vienna.
