= The Forester's Daughter (1952 film) =

1952 film directed by Arthur Maria Rabenalt

- German film poster
- German: Die Försterchristl
- Directed by: Arthur Maria Rabenalt
- Written by: Bernhard Buchbinder (operetta); Georg Jarno (operetta); Robert Gilbert; Fritz Böttger; Joachim Wedekind
- Starring: Johanna Matz; Karl Schönböck; Will Quadflieg
- Cinematography: Friedl Behn-Grund
- Edited by: Doris Zeltmann
- Music by: Georg Jarno; Bruno Uher
- Production company: Carlton-Film
- Distributed by: Panorama-Film
- Release date: 27 May 1952
- Running time: 103 minutes
- Country: West Germany
- Language: German

The Forester's Daughter (German: Die Försterchristl) is a 1952 West German musical comedy film directed by Arthur Maria Rabenalt and starring Johanna Matz, Karl Schönböck and Will Quadflieg. It is based on the 1907 operetta Die Försterchristl, which is set in the Austrian Empire during Franz Josef's reign. The film is part of the operetta film subgenre. It was shot at the Bavaria Studios in Munich and on location around Bad Tölz. The film's sets were designed by the art director Robert Herlth.

== Cast ==
- Johanna Matz as Försterchristl
- Karl Schönböck as Kaiser Franz Josef
- Will Quadflieg as Joseph Földessy aka Hauptmann Koltai
- Angelika Hauff as Ilona
- Käthe von Nagy as Gräfin Josefine
- Oskar Sima as Leisinger
- Ulrich Beiger as Simmerl
- Harry Halm as Oberhofmeister
- Willem Holsboer as Hütl
- Iván Petrovich as Graf Paalen
- Viktor Afritsch as Hauptmann der Leibgarde
- Harald Mannl as Wirt
- Jochen Hauer as Förster
