= The Bohemian Dancer (1926 film) =

1926 film

- Directed by: Frederic Zelnik
- Written by: Bernhard Buchbinder (libretto); Fanny Carlsen; Alfred Halm
- Produced by: Frederic Zelnik
- Starring: Lya Mara; Harry Liedtke; William Dieterle; Heinrich Peer
- Cinematography: Akos Farkas; Frederik Fuglsang; Mutz Greenbaum
- Music by: Hans May
- Production company: Zelnik-Film
- Distributed by: Süd-Film
- Release date: 5 March 1926
- Running time: 105 minutes
- Country: Germany
- Languages: Silent; German intertitles

The Bohemian Dancer (German: Die Försterchristl) is a 1926 German silent drama film directed by Frederic Zelnik and starring Lya Mara, Harry Liedtke, and William Dieterle. It premiered in Berlin on 5 March 1926. It is based on the operetta 1907 Die Försterchristl composed by Georg Jarno with a libretto by Bernhard Buchbinder. It was shot at the Staaken Studios in Berlin. The film's art direction was by Gustav A. Knauer and Andrej Andrejew who designed the sets. The film is set in Vienna and Hungary during the 18th century.

== Cast ==
- Lya Mara as Försterchristl
- Harry Liedtke as Kaiser Joseph II
- William Dieterle as Korporal Földessy
- Heinrich Peer as Fürst Kaunitz
- Eduard von Winterstein as Förster Lange
- Margarete Kupfer as Gräfin Degenfeld
- Berta Scheven as Kaiserin Maria Theresia
- Karl Harbacher as Hoffriseur Walperl
- Carl Geppert as Graf Dietrichstein
- Hermann Böttcher as Graf Leoben
- Irene Eisinger
- Oskar Karlweis
- Paul Richter

== Bibliography ==
- Grange, William (2008). Cultural Chronicle of the Weimar Republic. Lanham, MD: Scarecrow Press. ISBN 978-0-8108-5967-8.
