= Max Braunthal =

Max Julius Braunthal (20 July 1878 in Breslau (Silésie) - 8 November 1946 in Paris) was a German Jewish art collector and survivor of the Veld'Hiv roundup, as well as deportation to Drancy and Gurs internment camp. In February 2026 Braunthal's heirs filed a lawsuit in France against the Metropolitan Museum of Art de New York demanding the restitution of a painting by Pissarro, Haystacks, Morning, Eragny, 1899.

== Biography ==
Maximilian Julius Braunthal was born on 20 July 1878 in Breslau (Silesia), Germany.

Max Braunthal's first wife was Else Bork (born 15 January 1881 in Frankfurt, Darmstadt, Germany). They had three children: Erich Braunthal (1905-1966), an artist who studied with Max Liebermann; Lotte Cecile Braunthal (1907-1994), who managed to reach the United States; and Annaliese Cohen, born on 28 April 1913 in Frankfurt am Main, Germany, and died on 11 February 1944 in Auschwitz.

Max Braunthal divorced Else Bork and remarried Charlotte Silbermann. They had no children.

== Art collection ==
Braunthal started collecting paintings, drawings and etchings in 1902. His collection included Max Liebermann, Franz von Lenbach, Adolph Menzel, Wilhelm Trübner, Fritz von Uhde, Honoré Daumier, Pierre-Auguste Renoir, Gustave Courbet, Alfred Sisley, Jean Baptiste Camille Corot as well as Camille Pissarro.

== Nazi era persecution and loss ==
When Adolf Hitler rose to power in Germany in 1933, Braunthal was persecuted due to his Jewish heritage. His property was confiscated. His German citizenship was revoked by the Nazi regime. To escape Nazi antisemitism, Max Braunthal sought refuge in France, taking some of his possessions with him, including the Pissarro painting. In 1941, without financial resources, Max Braunthal and his wife Charlotte Braunthal sold the Pissarro painting for 100,000 francs to the Galerie Durand-Ruel, which specialized in Impressionist works.

Max Braunthal and Charlotte Braunthal were arrested in the Vel' d'Hiv Roundup. The Nazis confiscated the rest of their art collection, claiming it belonged to the German national heritage. The Braunthals were imprisoned in the French internments camp in Drancy and Gurs, but survived. Max Braunthal died in 1946 in Paris.

Braunthal's sister Malchen "Maly" Hamburger (Braunthal) (1873 - 1942) was deported by Nazis and murdered in Theresienstadt on 29 September 1942.

On 17 February 1941 the Braunthals sold their painting by Camille Pissarro, Haystacks, Morning, Éragny (1889) to the Durand-Ruel gallery. Within two weeks, the gallery had resold the painting for 140,000 francs, a 40 percent profit, to Wolfgang Krueger, a German dealer who, like Durand-Ruel, would later appear on the Art Looting Investigation Unit Red Flag List. Krueger sold it in 1958, and it passed through the hands of two owners before being acquired by the Knoedler Gallery in New York, and purchased in 1959 by Douglas Dillon (1909–2003), former chairman of the Metropolitan Museum's Board of Trustees.

== Claims for restitution ==
The Braunthal family has made claims for the restitution of artworks. As of 2026 they had 26 artworks registered on the German Lost Art Foundation's Lostart Website.

In 2023 Le Drame by Honoré Daumier was the object of a settlement agreement.

Seven heirs of the couple are suing the Metropolitan Museum of Art in New York for the return of Camille Pissarro's Haystacks, Morning, Éragny in a French court. For five years, they have been asking the Museum to return the painting to the family, without success. The painting had been donated to the Museum by its former president. Douglas Dillon en 2003.

== Readings ==
- Serge Klarsfeld. Le Mémorial de la déportation des Juifs de France. Beate et Serge Klarsfeld: Paris, 1978. Nouvelle édition, mise à jour, avec une liste alphabétique des noms.FFDJF (Fils et filles de déportés juifs de France), 2012.

== See also ==
- The Holocaust in France
- Aryanization
- List of claims for restitution for Nazi-looted art
- Holocaust Expropriated Art Recovery Act of 2016
- Nazi plunder
- Art theft and looting during World War II
- Metropolitan Museum of Art
- C. Douglas Dillon
- Knoedler
