= The Forester's Daughter (1931 film) =

1931 film

- German: Die Försterchristl
- Directed by: Frederic Zelnik
- Written by: Alfred Frank; Bruno Granichstaedten
- Produced by: Karl Julius Fritzsche
- Starring: Irene Eisinger; Paul Richter; Oskar Karlweis
- Cinematography: Akos Farkas; Mutz Greenbaum
- Music by: Bruno Granichstaedten
- Production company: Transozean Film
- Distributed by: Süd-Film
- Release date: 3 February 1931
- Running time: 90 minutes
- Country: Germany
- Language: German

The Forester's Daughter (German: Die Försterchristl) is a 1931 German operetta film directed by Frederic Zelnik and starring Irene Eisinger, Paul Richter and Oskar Karlweis. It is an adaptation of the operetta Die Försterchristl. Zelnik had previously directed a 1926 silent film version The Bohemian Dancer.

The film's sets were designed by Heinz Fenchel and Jacek Rotmil.

== Cast ==
- Irene Eisinger as Christl Lange, known as "Försterchristl"
- Paul Richter as Emperor Joseph II
- Oskar Karlweis as Wolfgang Amadeus Mozart
- André Pilot as Corporal Franzl Földessy
- Tibor Halmay as Walperl
- Fritz Daghofer as head Forester Lange, Christl's father
- Jelly Staffel as Everl, Mozarts beloved
- Adele Sandrock as Court Lady
- Max Ralph-Ostermann as the Emperor's First Adjutant (as Max-Ralf Ostermann)
- Hanns Waschatko as the Emperor's Second Adjutant
- Gretel Berndt as Fräulein von Földessy
- Louis V. Arco as Austrian officer
- Ernst Wurmser as chef cook at the Vienna Hofburg
- Heinrich Gotho as a notary
- Alfred Frank as worker #1
- Paul Hörbiger as The Old Baron
- Sylvia Torf as a peasant woman
- Rudolf Österreicher as worker #2
