= For Once I'd Like to Have No Troubles =

1932 film

- Directed by: Max Nosseck
- Written by: Max Colpet; Herbert Rosenfeld
- Produced by: August Mueller
- Starring: Max Hansen; Ursula Grabley; Fritz Grünbaum
- Cinematography: Robert Lach
- Edited by: Wolfgang Becker; Hermann Haller
- Music by: Willi Ostermann; Mischa Spoliansky
- Production company: Biograph Film
- Distributed by: Biograph Film
- Release date: 22 March 1932
- Running time: 81 minutes
- Country: Germany
- Language: German

For Once I'd Like to Have No Troubles (German: Einmal möcht' ich keine Sorgen haben) is a 1932 German musical comedy film directed by Max Nosseck and starring Max Hansen, Ursula Grabley and Fritz Grünbaum. It was shot at the Johannisthal Studios in Berlin. The film's sets were designed by the art directors Otto Gülstorff and Heinrich Richter.

== Synopsis ==
In Berlin during the Great Depression, unemployed barber's assistant Peter has to live on his wits. Hearing that a famous opera singer needs a shave, he hurries over and is soon also entrusted with walking his dog. Peter encounters Jenny a flower seller and tries to impress her by pretending that the singer's luxurious apartment is his own. Ultimately he comes clean and reveals his own true, more humble situation but receives a reward of a 1,000 marks for catching a car thief.

== Cast ==
- Max Hansen as Peter - ein Friseurgehilfe
- Ursula Grabley as Jenny - ein Blumenmädchen
- Josef Dannegger as Kammersänger Bellert
- Fritz Grünbaum as Chef des Konfektionshauses
- Hermann Job as Friseur Plaschke
- Hubert von Meyerinck as Görner - Friseurgehilfe
- Adele Sandrock as Die Oberlehrerin
- Eugen Neufeld as Mr.Felden - Generaldirektor
- Vera Busse as Mrs.Generaldirektor Felden
- Leo Sloma as Der dicke Mann
- Nico Turoff as Der Dieb
- Bernhard Goetzke as Der Wachmeister
- Grete Reinwald as Das Mädel von der Litfassäüle

== Bibliography ==
- Grange, William. Cultural Chronicle of the Weimar Republic. Scarecrow Press, 2008.
- Klaus, Ulrich J. Deutsche Tonfilme: Jahrgang 1932. Klaus-Archiv, 1988.
