= Two Hearts in 3/4 Time =

Two Hearts in 3/4 Time (or Two Hearts in ¾ Time) may refer to:

- a track on the 2000 album Since I Left You by the Avalanches
- a track on the 1958 album Happy-Go-Lucky Sound by The Three Suns
- Two Hearts in Waltz Time (1930 film), the German film Zwei Herzen im ¾ Takt
