= Vit Klemes =

Canadian hydrologist (1932–2010)

Vit Klemes (born Vít Klemeš; 30 April 1932, Podivín – 8 March 2010) was a Canadian hydrologist of Czech origin.

== Biography ==
Klemes received a Civil Engineering degree (Ing) from the Brno University of Technology, a CSc degree (a local equivalent of PhD) in hydrology and water resources from the Slovak Technical University in Bratislava and a DrSc degree from the Czech Technical University in Prague.

Following the Soviet-led invasion of Czechoslovakia, Klemes and his family came to Canada in September 1968. There he obtained a position of associate professor at the University of Toronto, first in the Department of Mechanical Engineering and later in the Institute of Environmental Sciences and Engineering. In 1972, he was appointed research hydrologist at the National Hydrology Research Institute of Environment Canada, a position he held for 17 years; after the institute's move from Ottawa to Saskatoon, he also served as its chief scientist. From 1990 to 1999 he was a water resources consultant in Victoria, British Columbia where he continued to live after his retirement until his death.

During his career Klemes has authored about 150 scientific and technical publications, lectured extensively on all five continents, was visiting professor at the California Institute of Technology (Caltech), the Swiss Federal Institute of Technology (ETH) in Zurich, Monash University in Melbourne, Agricultural University (BOKU) in Vienna, the University of Karlsruhe, and in 1994 was appointed Invited Professor at Institut National de la Recherche Scientifique of Universite du Quebec.

In 1987, he was elected President of the International Association of Hydrological Sciences (IAHS) and his work has been recognized by a number of awards; among other, he received a Gold Medal from the Slovak Academy of Sciences (1993), the International Hydrology Prize from the IAHS (1994), the Ray K. Linsley Award from the American Institute of Hydrology (1995) and the Ven Te Chow Award from the American Society of Civil Engineers (1998).

== Publications ==
- Common Sense and other Heresies - Selected Papers on Hydrology and Water Resources Engineering by Vít Klemeš, ed. by C. David Sellars (2000)
- An Imperfect Fit - Advanced democracy and human nature by Vit Klemes (2004)
