= Spell of the Looking Glass =

1932 film directed by Frank Wisbar

- Directed by: Frank Wisbar
- Written by: John H. Kafka; Ernst Länner (book); Wolfgang Wilhelm (book)
- Produced by: Herbert Ephraim
- Starring: Franz Weber; Ursula Grabley; Oskar Karlweis
- Cinematography: Herbert Körner
- Edited by: Wolfgang Becker; Alice Ludwig
- Music by: Herbert Lichtenstein
- Production company: Kollektiv Film
- Distributed by: Terra Film
- Release date: 14 December 1931
- Running time: 78 minutes
- Country: Germany
- Language: German

Spell of the Looking Glass (German: Im Bann des Eulenspiegels) is a 1932 German comedy drama film directed by Frank Wisbar and starring Franz Weber, Ursula Grabley, and Oskar Karlweis. It was shot at the Johannisthal Studios in Berlin. The film's sets were designed by the art directors Karl Machus and Fritz Maurischat.

== Cast ==
- Franz Weber as Baron Altmann
- Ursula Grabley as Elli Altmann, seine Tochter
- Oskar Karlweis as Menzel, Beamter im Gefängnislazarett
- Till Klockow as Lissy, Krankenschwester im Gefängnislazarett
- Karl Platen as Lehmkuhl, Chefarzt im Gefängnislazarett
- Theo Lingen as Rosnowsky, Finanzagent
- Hugo Fischer-Köppe as Erster Ausbrecher
- Raimund Janitschek as Zweiter Ausbsrecher
- Hedwig Wangel as Witwe Schramm, Besitzerin der Paradies-Bar
- Olly Gebauer as Adelheit, ihre Nichte
- Fritz Beckmann as Onkel Max
- Emmy Wyda as Tante Ida
- Marion Taal as Marion
- Ernst Wurmser as Der Portier

== Bibliography ==
- Thomas Elsaesser & Michael Wedel. The BFI companion to German cinema. British Film Institute, 1999.
