= Jan Kostrhun =

Czech writer and politician (1942–2022)

Member of the Chamber of Deputies of the Czech Republic
- In office 1 June 1996 – 20 June 2002

Member of the Federal Assembly of Czechoslovakia
- In office 6 June 1992 – 31 December 1992

Personal details
- Born: 3 July 1942 Podivín, Protectorate of Bohemia and Moravia
- Died: 2 May 2022 (aged 79)
- Party: KSČ (1968); ZS (1990–1994); ČSSD (since 1994)
- Education: Mendel University Brno
- Occupation: Writer

Jan Kostrhun (3 July 1942 – 2 May 2022) was a Czech politician. A member of the Czech Social Democratic Party, he served in the Chamber of Deputies from 1996 to 2002. He died on 2 May 2022 at the age of 79.
