= The Concert (1931 film) =

1931 film

- Directed by: Leo Mittler
- Written by: Hermann Bahr (play); Hans H. Zerlett
- Starring: Olga Chekhova; Oskar Karlweis; Ursula Grabley
- Cinematography: Enzo Riccioni
- Production company: Paramount Pictures
- Distributed by: Parufamet
- Release date: 9 November 1931
- Running time: 79 minutes
- Country: Germany
- Language: German

The Concert (German: Das Konzert) is a 1931 German comedy film based upon the play by Hermann Bahr, directed by Leo Mittler and starring Olga Chekhova, Oskar Karlweis, and Ursula Grabley. It was made by the German subsidiary of Paramount Pictures and released by UFA as part of the Parufamet distribution deal. It was shot at the Joinville Studios in Paris and premiered at the Gloria-Palast in Berlin.

== Plot ==
Professor Gustav Heink is a pianist and music teacher who is adored by his students, although he is no longer a young man. For decades, he has been married to Marie, who quietly tolerates his idiosyncrasies. Heink loves to flirt with young women. This gives him the self-affirmation that he is still young, attractive and desired. Between him and his wife, who still loves him dearly, a code has developed for this circumstance. When the master, as his students call him full of admiration, gives a “private concert”, this means nothing other than that Prof. Heink wants to have another affair, an extramarital sweetheart. Marie Heink has come to terms with this fait accompli and suffers quietly. The aging piano virtuoso assumes that his tolerant wife has no objections. Heink's latest conquest is called Delfine Jura and is married to the young scientist Dr. Franz Jura.

A liaison with a married woman? - that has never happened with Heink before, and so the two victims of this affair, Marie Heink and Delfine's husband Franz, decide after he, like her, from Heink's music student Eva Gerndl, who herself has had an eye on the pianist, about the affair were informed to intervene this time. Because of course, instead of touring, it's actually going to the music professor's love nest, a remote, lonely mountain hut run by the loyal Pollinger couple. Franz and Marie have come up with a clever plan: the two unfaithful people are told that they, Franz and Marie, have fallen in love with each other and that this shouldn't be a problem for the spouses, since Heink and Delfine would also be a couple. Suddenly, the pianist and his apprentice are no longer so sure about this and their passion for each other cools down noticeably. Jura and Marie have achieved what they wanted: Delfine returns to her charming husband, and Professor Heink finally understands what he has in his Marie.

== Cast ==
- Olga Chekhova as Maria Heink, Gattin
- Oskar Karlweis as Doktor Jura
- Ursula Grabley as Delfine, Schülerin
- Walter Janssen as Prof. Gustav Heink, Pianist
- Karl Etlinger as Pollinger
- Toni Tetzlaff as Frau Pollinger
- Karin Evans as Eva Gerndl, Schülerin
- Lotte Lorring as Frl. Wehner
- Diana Hart as Heinks Schülerin
- [Florizel Constantinescu as Heinks Schülerin
- Cecile Gehlers as Heinks Schülerin
- Ilse Gery as Heinks Schülerin

== Bibliography ==
- Beevor, Antony (2005). The Mystery of Olga Chekhova. New York: Penguin. ISBN 978-1-101-17505-7.
