= My Wife, the Impostor =

1931 film

- Directed by: Kurt Gerron
- Written by: Philipp Lothar Mayring; Ernst Wolff; Fritz Zeckendorf
- Produced by: Joseph Than
- Starring: Heinz Rühmann; Käthe von Nagy; Fritz Grünbaum; Hermann Vallentin
- Cinematography: Karl Puth; Eugen Schüfftan
- Edited by: Constantin Mick
- Music by: Willy Kollo
- Production company: UFA
- Distributed by: UFA
- Release date: 18 September 1931
- Running time: 91 minutes
- Country: Germany
- Language: German

My Wife, the Impostor (German: Meine Frau, die Hochstaplerin) is a 1931 German comedy film directed by Kurt Gerron and starring Heinz Rühmann, Käthe von Nagy and Fritz Grünbaum. It was shot at the Babelsberg Studios in Berlin. The film's sets were designed by the art director Otto Erdmann and Hans Sohnle. A separate French-language version was also made, with a different cast.

== Synopsis ==
Peter is an easygoing bank clerk but his wife Jutta has much grander ambitions for her husband. When she meets the sausage manufacturer Marty, she pretends that Peter is in fact the director of the bank. This seems a stroke of good fortune for Marry as his business is struggling and the assistance of a powerful banker could help. To maintain the ruse Jutta takes him to a luxury hotel. There she encounters the singer Ileana, the wife of a wealthy mustard producer. Spotting a potential combination, she masterminds a merger between the two concerns. To cap it all Peter is now given an important job in the management of the new joint factory.

== Cast ==
- Heinz Rühmann as Peter Bergmann, Bankbeamter
- Käthe von Nagy as Jutta Bergmann, seine Frau
- Fritz Grünbaum as Silbermann, ein Agent
- Hermann Vallentin as Marty, Würstchen en gros
- Alfred Abel as Mr. Knast, Senf en gros
- Maly Delschaft as Ileana
- Theo Lingen as Manager Ileanas
- Hans Wassmann as Dr. Sommer, Nervenarzt
- Fritz Albertia as Direktor der Landeskreditbank
- Else Heimsas as Frau Klaffke, Zimmervermieterin
- Edith Meinhard
- Ernst Wurmser
- Hubert von Meyerinck
- Georg Schmieter
- Walter Eckard
- Julius Brandt
- Georg H. Schnell

== Bibliography ==
- Hake, Sabine (2001). Popular Cinema of the Third Reich. University of Texas Press. ISBN 978-0-292-73458-6.
