= Irene Eisinger =

Austrian and British opera singer and film actress (1903–1994)

- Born: 8 December 1903; Kostel, South Moravian Region
- Died: 8 April 1994 (aged 90); Weston-super-Mare, Somerset, UK
- Occupations: Operatic soprano, actress
- Organizations: Glyndebourne Festival Opera

Irene Eisinger (8 December 1903 – 8 April 1994) was an Austrian and British opera singer and film actress. Her career was closely linked to the foundation and the early years of the Glyndebourne Festival Opera.

== Life and career ==
Irene Eisinger was born in Kostel, South Moravian Region, now Czech Republic. She was trained as a soubrette soprano at the Akademie für Musik und darstellende Kunst in Vienna by the singer Paula Mark-Neusser.

=== Operas and films ===
Her debuts – both in opera and film – took place in 1926. She played a minor role in Frederic Zelnik's silent movie Die Försterchristl and started singing leading roles in operas and operettas at the Stadttheater Basel in the north of Switzerland. In 1928 she was called to Berlin and within a short period became one of the favourite singers of conductor Otto Klemperer – first at the Kroll Opera House, later on at the prestigious Staatsoper Unter den Linden. Although best remembered for her soubrette roles in Mozart operas, especially Despina and Blonde, and as Ännchen in Weber's Der Freischütz, she achieved also great successes and admiration in Strauss operetta roles, particularly as Arsena in Der Zigeunerbaron and as Adele in Die Fledermaus. Musicologist Elizabeth Forbes describes her singing: "Her voice, bright-toned, light and very flexible, and her charming, diminutive appearance, invariably drew adjectives such as 'enchanting' and 'winsome' from the critics."

In 1930 came what can be considered her breakthrough in both Germany and Austria as she debuted as Adele in Max Reinhardt's version of Die Fledermaus, as Cherubino in Mozart's Le nozze di Figaro at the Salzburg Festival and again as Adele at the Vienna State Opera. Furthermore, in this year her first sound film was released, the light comedy Two Hearts in Waltz Time – with Eisinger as Anni Lohmeier and with the popular actor Willi Forst in a leading role. This film was the first foreign language film to be released with subtitles in the United States. Two further leading film parts followed in 1931: Leopoldine in Die lustigen Weiber von Wien and the title role in another Zelnik-version of Die Försterchristl, now with sound and singing.

Cherubino in Salzburg was hers until 1933, and in 1931 she added another role to her Salzburg repertory: Papagena in Die Zauberflöte – again with repeat invitations until 1933. In 1932, Eisinger performed in the Cabaret opera Rufen Sie Herrn Plim by Mischa Spoliansky and sang Luise Matthes in the Kurt Weill opera Die Bürgschaft next to Hans Reinmar and Lotte Lenya at the Städtische Oper Berlin. The conductor was Fritz Stiedry.

She appeared in two short films (Kabarett-Programm Nr. 4, 1931, and Eine Johann-Strauss-Fantasie, 1933) and did several recordings with Grammophon, Electrola, Ultraphon and Orchestrola. Her singing covered a broad repertory spanning from Mozart and Auber to C. M. Weber, Albert Lortzing, Puccini, Lehár and Strauss, including works of Leo Fall, Bruno Granichstaedten, Ralph Benatzky and Robert Stolz. Her male partners in duets were Siegfried Arno, Paul Morgan, Joseph Schmidt, Erik Wirl and Richard Fritz Wolf.

=== Emigration, Glyndebourne, ROH ===
Although very popular with the Berlin audience, Eisinger was forced to leave Germany because of her Jewish origins shortly after the Machtergreifung by the Nazi party in 1933. She could not sing any longer in any theatre of the German capital. She took refuge in Czechoslovakia and went to sing in the opera houses of Prague, Amsterdam and Bruxelles – and once again at the Salzburg Festival. In 1933, in addition to Cherubino and Papagena she was invited to sing a role in a Richard Strauss opera. It was to be her last appearance in Salzburg. She sang Hermione in the first production of the second version of Die ägyptische Helena.

Eisinger continued to sing at Prague State Opera until 1937, but already in 1934 she was invited by German emigrants Fritz Busch and Carl Ebert to participate at the first Glyndebourne Festival. Unknown to British audiences, she sang Despina in Mozart's Così fan tutte and scored a great personal success. Thereafter she became a firm favourite at the festival, debuting as Blonde in Die Entführung aus dem Serail and as Papagena in Die Zauberflöte in 1935, returning there each year but one, until the outbreak of the Second World War forced the festival to close down. The 1935 Glyndebourne recording of Così fan tutte, conducted by Fritz Busch, gives an idea of Eisinger's voice, her stylish singing and her delightful personality. Although she did not appear at the Festival in 1936, the artist sang the Aquarellen waltz, op. 258, by Josef Strauss at a concert in Glyndebourne this year – with 600 of John Christie's employees and tenants present, to commemorate the birth of Christie's son George on 31 December 1934. Due to its success, the concert had to be repeated.

In 1936 the impresario C. B. Cochran, who had been entranced by her Papagena in Glyndebourne, engaged her for the revue Follow the Sun at the Adelphi in London. There she sang the always much applauded song Love is a Dancing Thing, a popular number by Howard Dietz and Arthur Schwartz. Cochran was praised to engage Miss Eisinger by The Sunday Times: ″A beautiful little lady [with a] small but charming voice″. Her partner was the baritone Gerald Nodin. In December of the same year, Eisinger debuted at the Royal Opera House as Gretel in Humperdincks Hänsel und Gretel, with Maggie Teyte as Hänsel, sung in German language. A week later she sang Adele in Die Fledermaus (in English), "winning a particular triumph" with the song Mein Herr Marquis.

For the next three seasons, Eisinger returned to Glyndebourne, where she added Susanna and Barbarina in Le nozze di Figaro to her Glyndebourne repertory while still continuing to sing her other roles. By now she was permanently living in England. In 1939 Eisinger sang Ilya in a university production of Mozart's Idomeneo at Cambridge and acted in Beatrice Saxon Snell's musical Georgian Springtime at the Embassy Theatre in London – with Geoffrey Dunn, Frederick Ranalow, and George Skillan in the cast. In 1940, when Glyndebourne toured The Beggar's Opera, she took over Polly Peachum from Audrey Mildmay who had contracted Rubella during the London run. Furthermore, she participated in the movie comedy Young Man's Fancy and was invited by BBC to sing in Die Fledermaus and in Arlecchino, a single act opera by Ferruccio Busoni.

When Glyndebourne closed down, Eisinger withdrew from the stage.

Her last operatic performances were a series of seven performances of Così fan tutte in the original Glyndebourne production of Carl Ebert at the Edinburgh International Festival in August and September 1949 – together with a prominent cast consisting of Suzanne Danco (Fiordiligi), Sena Jurinac (Dorabella), Petre Munteanu (Ferrando), Marko Rothmüller (Guglielmo), John Brownlee (Don Alfonso) and the Royal Philharmonic Orchestra conducted by Hans Oppenheim. She sang Despina.

Thereafter she was heard only in broadcast concerts on BBC.

=== Private life ===
In 1932 Eisinger married the physician Gerhard Schönewald (1905–1981), called Gert. The couple emigrated to London and had two daughters, Susanne (born in 1944) and Emily-Ruth (1946). The couple later divorced.

Eisinger died on 8 April 1994, in Weston-super-Mare, Somerset, Great Britain.

== Recording ==
- Così fan tutte (Wolfgang Amadeus Mozart), role of Despina. Glyndebourne Festival Opera Company conducted by Fritz Busch. Electrola DB 2652 bis DB 2673 – Glyndebourne, June 1935

== Filmography ==
Title	Year	Role	Director
The Bohemian Dancer	1926		Frederic Zelnik
Two Hearts in Waltz Time	1930	Anni Lohmeier	Géza von Bolváry
The Forester's Daughter	1931	Christl Lange called "Försterchristl"	Frederic Zelnik
The Merry Wives of Vienna	1931	Leopoldine	Géza von Bolváry
The Immortal Hour	1939	Etain	Rutland Boughton
Young Man's Fancy	1939	Singer at the Hôtel de L'Univers	Robert Stevenson

== Sources ==
- Elizabeth Forbes: Obituary: Irene Eisinger. In: The Independent, 30 April 1994.
- Josef Kaut: Die Salzburger Festspiele 1920–1981, Mit einem Verzeichnis der aufgeführten Werke und der Künstler des Theaters und der Musik von Hans Jaklitsch, Salzburg: Residenz Verlag 1982, ISBN 3-7017-0308-6, pp. 258, 261, 265, 268 and 269.
- Jürgen Kesting: Die großen Sänger. Volume 2. Verlag Hoffmann und Campe, Hamburg 2008, p. 700.
