= Ursula Grabley =

German actress

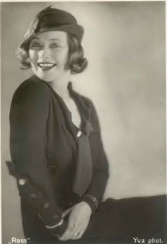
- Born: Margarete Marie Feodora Grabley; 8 December 1908; Woltersdorf, Brandenburg, German Empire
- Died: 3 April 1977 (aged 68); Brilon, West Germany
- Occupation: Actress
- Years active: 1929-1977
- Spouse(s): Viktor de Kowa (1926-1941) (divorced); Kurt Gumpert (1968-1977) (her death)

Ursula Grabley (8 December 1908 – 3 April 1977) was a German actress. She appeared in more than 80 films and television shows between 1929 and 1977. Her acting career started during the late silent era and blossomed in the sound era that soon followed. The cast of the 1929 silent film Katharina Knie included Ursula and her then husband Viktor de Kowa.

She trained as a ballet dancer. Her film career stalled during the war years after a private altercation with Nazi propaganda minister Joseph Goebbels. From the 1950s onwards, she often played motherly figures in films and on television. She provided the German voice for Lucille Ball. Ursula died of a stroke during a theatrical tour of "Cat on a Hot Tin Roof".

== Selected filmography ==
- Katharina Knie (1929)
- The Concert (1931)
- That's All That Matters (1931)
- For Once I'd Like to Have No Troubles (1932)
- The Black Hussar (1932)
- Spell of the Looking Glass (1932)
- The Golden Anchor (1932)
- Voices of Spring (1933)
- The Marathon Runner (1933)
- Scandal in Budapest (1933)
- Bashful Felix (1934)
- At the Strasbourg (1934)
- The Tannhof Women (1934)
- Annette in Paradise (1934)
- Make Me Happy (1935)
- The Call of the Jungle (1936)
- Ride to Freedom (1937)
- The Chief Witness (1937)
- A Girl from the Chorus (1937)
- The Impossible Mister Pitt (1938)
- Hurrah! I'm a Father (1939)
- Twilight (1940)
- Anna Alt (1945)
- Under the Bridges (1946)
- Blondes for Export (1950)
- Thirteen Under One Hat (1950)
- The Colourful Dream (1952)
- They Call It Love (1953)
- Confession Under Four Eyes (1954)
- Mamitschka (1955)
- Father's Day (1955)
- Without You All Is Darkness (1956)
- The Night Before the Premiere (1959)
- Heaven, Love and Twine (1960)
- Zur Hölle mit den Paukern (1968)
