= The Merry Wives of Vienna =

1931 film directed by Géza von Bolváry

- Directed by: Géza von Bolváry
- Written by: Julius Brammer (libretto); Alfred Grünwald (libretto); Samuel Lerner; Walter Reisch
- Produced by: Julius Haimann
- Starring: Willi Forst; Lee Parry; Paul Hörbiger
- Cinematography: Willy Goldberger
- Music by: Robert Stolz
- Production company: Super-Film
- Distributed by: Super-Film
- Release date: 6 March 1931
- Running time: 109 minutes
- Country: Germany
- Language: German

The Merry Wives of Vienna (German: Die lustigen Weiber von Wien) is a 1931 German musical comedy film directed by Géza von Bolváry and starring Willi Forst, Lee Parry, and Paul Hörbiger. It was shot at the Tempelhof Studios in Berlin. The film's sets were designed by Andrej Andrejew and Gabriel Pellon. It is an operetta film set in pre–First World War Vienna.

== Cast ==
- Willi Forst as Augustin Tuschinger, Tanzlehrer
- Lee Parry as Gretl
- Paul Hörbiger as Anselm Leitner, Hofrat
- Irene Eisinger as Leopoldine
- Evi Eva as Adolphine
- Elfriede Jera as Hermine
- Lilian Ellis as Christine
- Edith Hermann-Roeder as Alvine
- Alexandra Molino as Wilhelmine
- Camilla Fiebig as Pauline
- Lola Werner as Josephine
- Jaggi Graßmann as Ernestine
- Bimmy Rowland as Philippine
- Ernst Wurmser as Alois Stanigl, Caféhausbesitzer
- Oskar Sima as Exzellenz Waldmüller, Kultusminister
- Cordy Millowitsch as Therese Zelenka
- Tibor Halmay as Jean, Oberkellner
- Fritz Odemar as Johann, Kammerdiener
- Bitza Mühlau as Köchin

== Bibliography ==
- Grange, William (2008). Cultural Chronicle of the Weimar Republic. Lanham, MD: Scarecrow Press. ISBN 978-0-8108-5967-8.
