= Fritz Grünbaum =

Austrian cabaret artist (1880–1941)

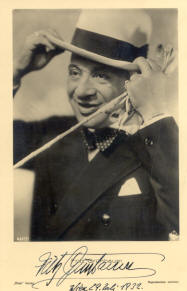
- Born: Franz Friedrich Grünbaum; 7 April 1880; Brünn, Moravia, Austria-Hungary
- Died: 14 January 1941 (aged 60); Dachau, Germany
- Occupations: Cabaret artist, operetta and song writer, director, actor and master of ceremonies

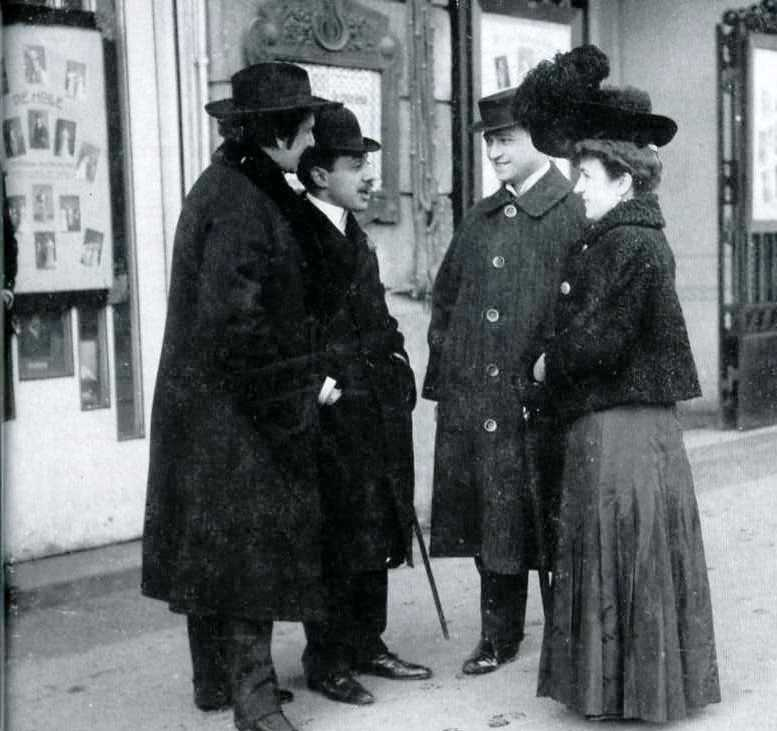
Grünbaum (2nd from left) in front of Die Hölle cabaret, c. 1908

Franz Friedrich "Fritz" Grünbaum (7 April 1880 – 14 January 1941) was an Austrian Jewish cabaret artist, operetta and popular song writer, actor, and master of ceremonies whose art collection was looted by Nazis before he was murdered in the Holocaust.

== Early life and education ==
Grünbaum was born and grew up in Brünn, then the capital of the Margraviate of Moravia (now Brno, Czech Republic). He later stated his father's occupation as "art dealer". From 4 October 1899 to 31 July 1903, he studied at the Law Faculty of the University of Vienna, lodging in the 2nd district like the majority of Jewish migrants to Vienna. He did not complete a doctorate in law, so could not practise, but left with the equivalent of a master's degree. While still a student, he worked as a journalist and as a legal advisor to the finance department and the police in Brünn and began a literary association there, the Neue Akademische Vereinigung für Kunst und Literatur, which brought many contemporary writers to the city.

== Career ==
In 1906, he returned to Vienna and became master of ceremonies at a new cabaret in the basement of the Theater an der Wien called Die Hölle (Hell); it opened on 7 October 1906 with Phryne, the first operetta for which he wrote the libretto (with Robert Bodanzky). In 1907, when he was on stage presenting at the cabaret, an officer made an anti-Semitic heckling remark; Grünbaum boxed his ears and subsequently fought a sabre and pistols duel with him and was wounded.

From 1907 to 1910 he left Vienna for Berlin, under contract as a master of ceremonies with Rudolf Nelson after a first appearance at Nelson's Chat Noir (Black Cat) cabaret. He then returned to Vienna, where he worked at Die Hölle for two more years and then at Simplicissimus (now Simpl cabaret). He was now well known for rhymed monologues, libretti, and song lyrics.

His career was interrupted in 1915 by service as a volunteer in the First World War, but his work continued to be performed and he continued to write, including pacifist poetry published only after war's end. Grünbaum also appeared frequently as a master of ceremonies in Berlin.

In the 1920s, he moved frequently between Vienna and Berlin, where in 1921 he met Karl Farkas; in 1922 they began collaborating as masters of ceremony, both extemporising rhyme, the so-called Doppelconférence for which they became famous. In late 1924, he began an association with Kurt Robitschek and Paul Morgan's Kabarett der Komiker (Comedians' Cabaret) or Kadeko in Berlin, also writing for its newsletter, Die Frechheit (Cheek). He also appeared to acclaim in the German cities of Frankfurt, Leipzig, and Munich, and further afield in Karlsbad, Marienbad and Prague, performed at the Berlin Volkstheater and the Vienna Kammerspiele, and appeared in more than ten films.

He also became more politically engaged. In September 1925 he began a weekly column of verse commentary in the Vienna Neue 8 Uhr-Blatt, and in April 1927 was a co-signatory of the Kundgebung für ein geistiges Wien, calling for intellectual freedom to be guaranteed. When the power failed during a performance, he once quipped: "I can't see a thing, not a single thing; I must have stumbled into National Socialist culture."

Following the Nazi seizure of power in 1933, Jewish performers were forbidden to appear in Germany, and many moved to Vienna. Grünbaum was the subject of an article in Der Stürmer the following year. His and Farkas' last revue, Metro Grünbaum – Farkas tönende Wochenschau, premièred on 29 February 1938; on 12 March, the Nazis marched into Austria and the show closed after two weeks.

== Nazi persecution and murder ==
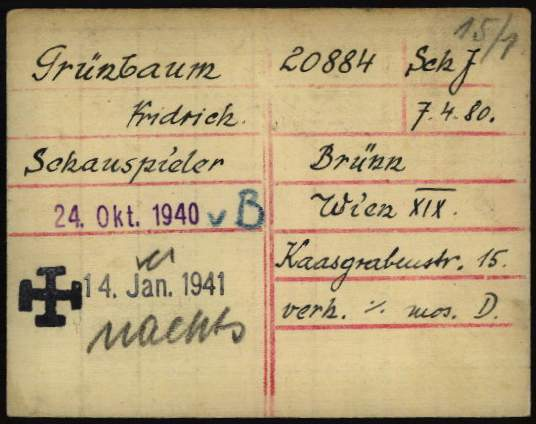
Grünbaum's prisoner registry card at Dachau Concentration Camp

Grünbaum and his wife, Lilly, attempted to flee to Czechoslovakia, but were caught. Initially he was interned in Vienna as a political undesirable, rather than a Jew; on 24 May 1938, together with Morgan, Fritz Löhner-Beda and Hermann Leopoldi, he was deported to Dachau concentration camp. He was transported from there to Buchenwald on 23 September 1938, and on 4 October 1940 back to Dachau. He continued to quip, for example musing on the effectiveness of starvation as a cure for diabetes and in response to a guard refusing him soap, saying that those who did not have enough money for soap had no business running a concentration camp. After a final performance on New Year's Eve for his fellow inmates, he died on 14 January 1941.

A star was dedicated to him on the Walk of Fame of Cabaret in Mainz, Germany. He is buried in Vienna Central Cemetery, Old Israelite Part, Gate 1.

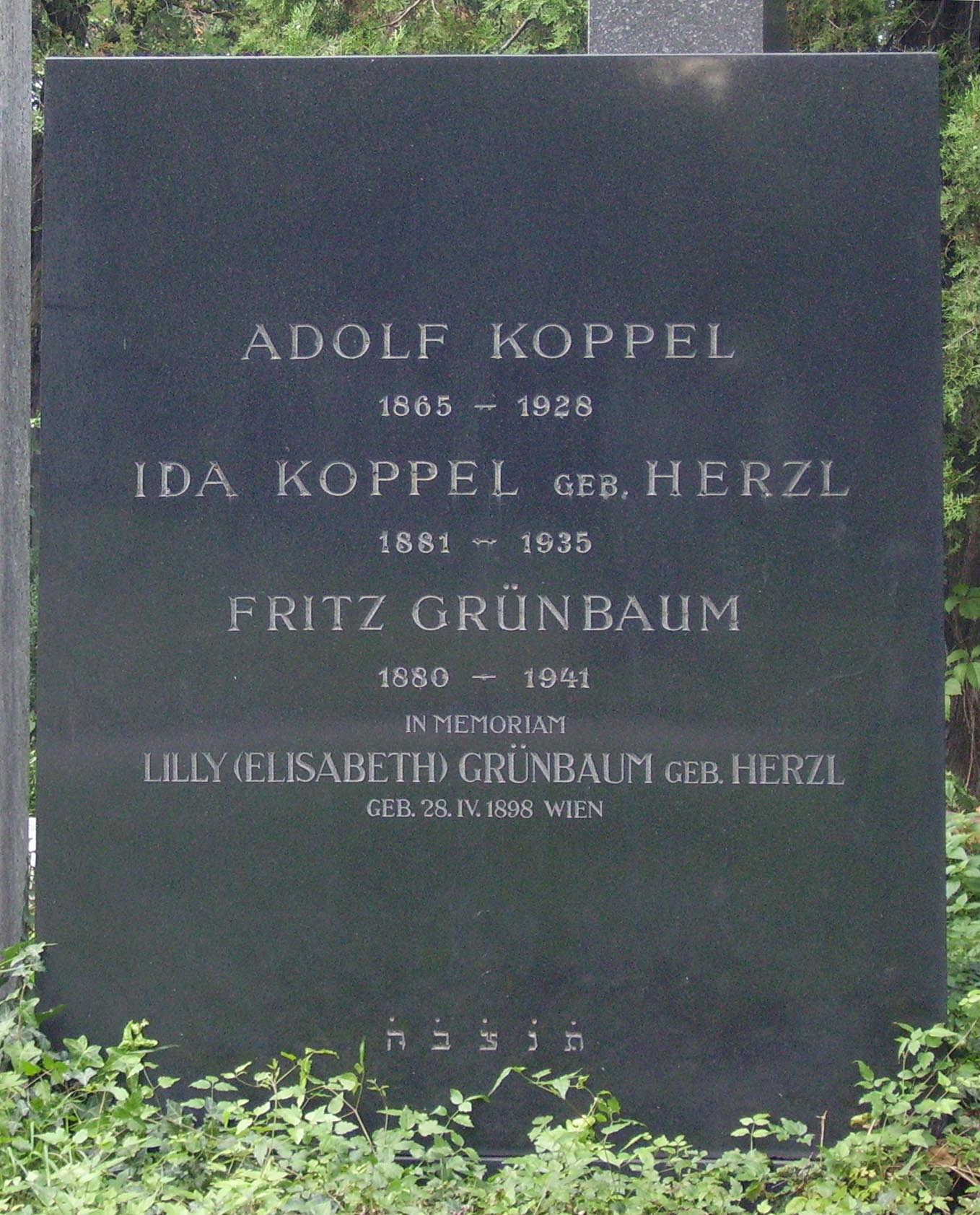
Grünbaum's grave in Vienna Central Cemetery, with memorial to his wife Lilly

== Marriages ==
Fritz Grünbaum was married three times. On 1 August 1908, he married Carli Nagelmüller, a fellow cabarettist whom he had met at the Chat noir; they were divorced in December 1914, and she died in 1930. He then married singer Mizzi Dressl. On 10 November 1919 he was married for the last time, to Elisabeth "Lilly" Herzl. She was evicted from their flat in Vienna on 15 July 1938, moving in with a friend, Elsa Klauber; after several forced relocations, they were both deported on 5 October 1942 to the Maly Trostenets extermination camp, where she died on 9 October.

== Art collection ==
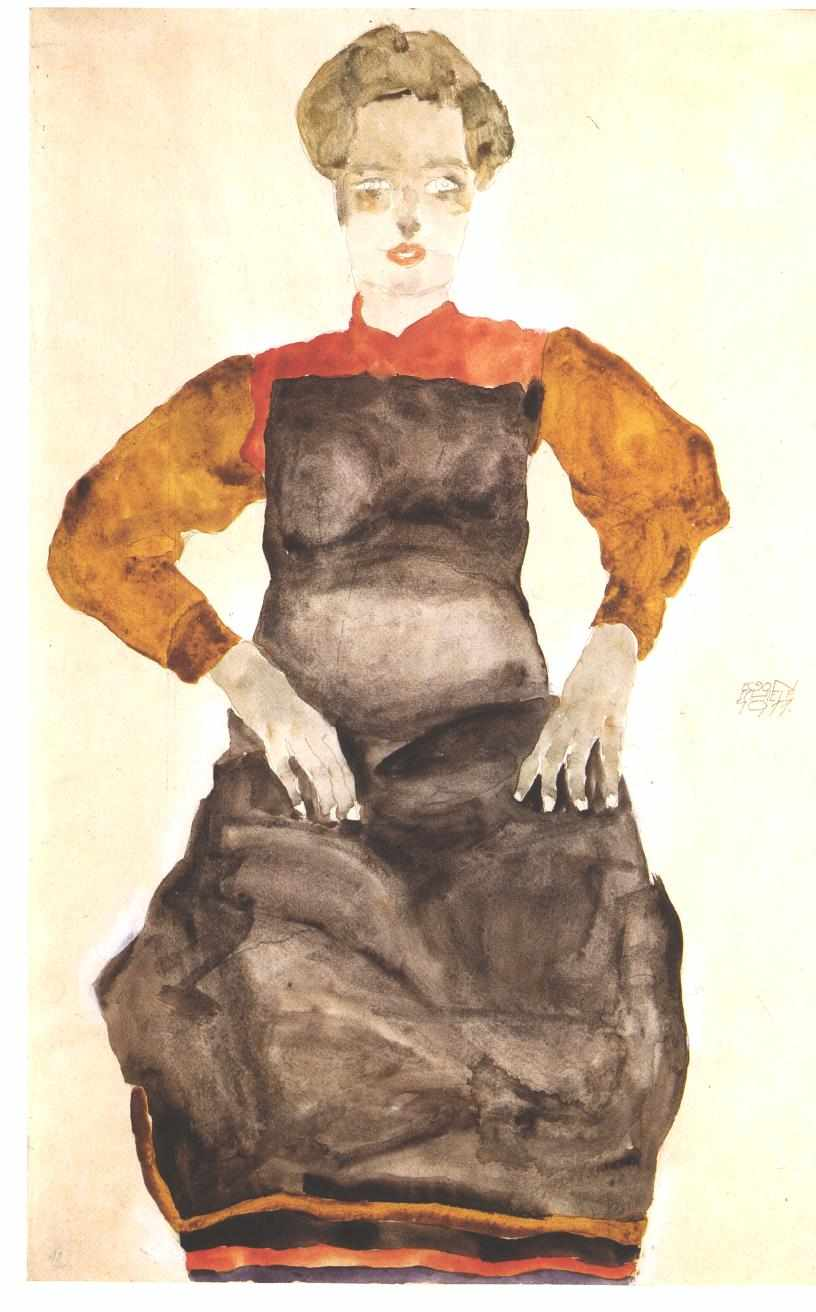
Schiele's Woman in a Black Pinafore (1911)

Starting in the 1920s, Grünbaum amassed a well known art collection, especially of Austrian modernist art, works from which were featured in catalogues and exhibitions. The collection came to include over 400 pieces, including 80 by Egon Schiele. The collection disappeared during the Nazi period. In the early 1950s, approximately 25% appeared on the art market through Swiss art dealer Eberhard Kornfeld. The fate of the rest is unknown.

=== Restitution ===
The heirs of Fritz Grünbaum have pursued an extensive legal campaign to recover artworks they assert were looted by the Nazis from their ancestor's collection, facing multiple court battles over decades. This ongoing restitution effort gained new momentum following the enactment of the Holocaust Expropriated Art Recovery Act (HEAR Act) in 2016, which provided enhanced legal tools for claimants seeking to reclaim stolen cultural property.

==== Tote Stadt III ====
The Grünbaum family initiated legal proceedings in 1999 to recover Egon Schiele's 1911 work Dead City III, which they discovered was being exhibited at New York's Museum of Modern Art. The painting had originally belonged to Fritz Grünbaum's art collection. At the time of the dispute, the Leopold Museum Private Foundation had loaned the artwork to MoMA for display.

Legal representatives for the Grünbaum estate filed claims asserting that the work had been confiscated by the Nazis and constituted looted art that should be returned to the family. The Museum of Modern Art invoked protections under New York's Arts and Cultural Affairs Law, which shields artworks from seizure while they are part of museum exhibitions. Although prosecutors in New York attempted to prevent the painting's departure from the United States, these efforts proved unsuccessful. The artwork was subsequently shipped back to Austria, and the Grünbaum family's restitution case did not achieve its intended outcome.

==== Seated Woman With Bent Left Leg ====
A 1917 Schiele drawing titled Seated Woman with Bent Left Leg (Torso) became the subject of the initial ownership dispute involving Fritz Grünbaum's descendants. During the 1960s, an American sculptor had purchased this work and added it to his personal collection. Nearly four decades later, in 2004, the collector decided to sell the piece through Sotheby's auction house.

The sale process was interrupted when Grünbaum's heirs challenged the legitimacy of the current owner's claim to the artwork. In response to this challenge, the holder of the drawing sought judicial resolution by filing suit in New York's federal court system to establish clear legal ownership. The court proceedings concluded with a ruling that upheld the defendant's rights to the work, thereby rejecting the family's attempt to reclaim the drawing.

==== Town on the Blue River ====
The heirs won their first victory in 2014, when a Schiele watercolor, Town on the Blue River, was sold by the Christie's auction house under an acknowledgment that Grünbaum was a previous owner, with a share of the proceeds reserved for his heirs.

==== Reif vs Nagy ====
In 2019, a New York trial court ruled in favor of the heirs and against the London art dealer Richard Nagy who had claimed ownership. Then, in 2022, the New York Court of Appeals upheld the lower court's decision, 5-0. Justice Anil Singh wrote, "We reject the notion that a person who signs a power of attorney in a death camp can be said to have executed the document voluntarily. ... Any subsequent transfer of the artworks did not convey legal title."

==== Restitution claims involving Austria museums ====
Restitution proceedings in Austria concerning works from Fritz Grünbaum's collection have addressed drawings held in both the Leopold Museum Private Foundation and the Albertina. The central questions have been whether specific Schiele works can be securely identified as part of Grünbaum's pre-war collection, how they reappeared on the Swiss art market in the 1950s through sales by his sister-in-law Mathilde Lukacs, and whether such sales should be considered valid transactions or the consequence of Nazi persecution. Under Austria's Art Restitution Act, the decisive issue has been whether the works were demonstrably seized or lost through void legal acts during the Nazi period.

===== Leopold Museum =====
In November 2010, the Restitution Advisory Board considered two Schiele works in the Leopold Museum Foundation. The Board accepted that Grünbaum and his wife were persecuted and that his collection was inventoried under Nazi rule, but found no proof that the specific works in question had been confiscated or forcibly transferred. It noted that the works surfaced in Switzerland in the 1950s through sales by Grünbaum's sister-in-law, Mathilde Lukacs. As the evidence did not demonstrate a direct expropriation or void legal act under the 1946 Annulment Law, restitution was not recommended.

===== Albertina =====
In October 2015, the Restitution Advisory Board reviewed two Schiele drawings in the Albertina: Sitzender weiblicher Rückenakt mit rotem Rock and Edith Schiele mit ihrem Neffen. The Board reiterated that Grünbaum's collection was extensive and persecutory circumstances were clear, but concluded that the works had come into the Albertina via sales made in the 1950s by Mathilde Lukacs to Swiss dealers and later transfers to Austrian collections. While it acknowledged reasons to believe the works once belonged to Grünbaum, the Board held that there was insufficient evidence of confiscation or unlawful seizure during the Nazi period, and thus no basis for restitution under the Art Restitution Act.

==== Restitution claims involving US museums ====
In 2023 and early 2024, several American museums relinquished works by Egon Schiele that had once belonged to Fritz Grünbaum. Acting on seizure warrants issued by the Manhattan District Attorney's Antiquities Trafficking Unit, institutions across the United States agreed to return drawings that had long been the subject of restitution claims by Grünbaum's heirs. Among them were Oberlin College’s Allen Memorial Art Museum, the Carnegie Museum of Art in Pittsburgh, the Santa Barbara Museum of Art in California, the Morgan Library & Museum, and the Museum of Modern Art in New York.

===== Allen Memorial Art Museum =====
In September 2023, the Manhattan District Attorney's office seized Egon Schiele's Girl with Black Hair from the Allen Memorial Art Museum at Oberlin College. In response to the seizure warrant, the Allen stated that it had purchased the drawing in 1958 from Galerie St. Etienne in New York, which had obtained it from the Bern gallery Gutekunst & Klipstein. According to the museum, the Swiss gallery recorded its purchase in 1956 from Mathilde Lukacs, Lilly Grünbaum's sister. The museum noted that Lukacs had fled Austria for Belgium in 1938, but that “exactly how Lukacs acquired it is not clear; the crucial facts as to how she came to possess it and other artworks she sold remain unknown, and died with her in 1979.” The Allen further stated that, despite this lack of clarity, it resolved to hand over the drawing to the Grünbaum heirs: “While we believe it has not been definitively established that the drawing was looted from Grünbaum's collection, the College has voluntarily turned it over, hoping that this will provide some measure of closure to the family.” The Grünbaum heirs subsequently sold Girl with Black Hair at a Christie's auction.

===== Art Institute of Chicago =====
The Art Institute of Chicago became the sole major museum to challenge the Manhattan DA's approach when it refused to comply with a September 2023 seizure warrant for Egon Schiele's Russian War Prisoner (1916). Unlike other institutions that voluntarily surrendered works from Grünbaum's collection, the Art Institute mounted a legal defense on multiple fronts. The museum argued that the painting was never looted by Nazis but remained within the family, claiming Grünbaum's sister-in-law Mathilde Lukacs legally inherited and sold the work to Swiss dealer Eberhard Kornfeld in 1956. The museum also challenged the Manhattan District Attorney's jurisdiction over artwork located in Illinois, contending that criminal proceedings were inappropriate for what they characterized as a civil ownership dispute.

===== Carnegie Museums of Pittsburgh =====
In Pittsburgh, the Carnegie Museum of Art relinquished Schiele's Portrait of a Man after it was seized by the Manhattan District Attorney's office and returned in January 2024. In its statement, the museum emphasized that it had never considered the work to be Nazi-looted: “To date, we have relied on a finding confirmed and upheld in federal court that the collection to which this drawing belonged was not, in fact, stolen by the Nazis.” Despite maintaining that its ownership had been legitimate, the Carnegie elected not to challenge the criminal proceedings and handed the drawing over for restitution. The painting was subsequently sold through Christie's.

===== Morgan Library and Museum =====
In September 2023, the Morgan Library and Museum returned Egon Schiele's Self-Portrait (1910) to the heirs of Fritz Grünbaum, following its seizure by the Manhattan District Attorney's Antiquities Trafficking Unit. The museum had acquired the work through the 2005 bequest of Broadway lyricist Fred Ebb, who died in 2004. The Morgan did not comment publicly on the return, and the drawing was subsequently sold at auction at Christie's.

===== Museum of Modern Art =====
In September 2023, the Manhattan District Attorney's Antiquities Trafficking Unit seized from the Museum of Modern Art (MoMA) two Egon Schiele works: Prostitute (1912) and Girl Putting on Shoe (1910). MoMA voluntarily surrendered both works but did not issue a public statement. After the works were returned to the heirs, while Girl Putting on Shoe was privately sold to an anonymous buyer, Prostitute was sold at Christie's November 2023 evening sale along with other restituted works.

===== Santa Barbara Museum =====
In September 2023, the Santa Barbara Museum of Art returned Egon Schiele's Portrait of the Artist's Wife, Edith to the heirs of Fritz Grünbaum. The drawing had been donated to the museum in 1957 by founding member Wright S. Ludington. The heirs had sought restitution since 2006, filing a lawsuit in 2022. Following the seizure of the drawing by the Manhattan District Attorney's Antiquities Trafficking Unit, the museum resolved to return the drawing. According to a public statement by the museum, this decision was taken after Manhattan prosecutors presented them with “relevant information concerning the provenance.” The heirs subsequently sold the work through Christie's.

==== Dispute with Christie's ====
In August 2025, Czech national Milos Vavra filed a petition against the auction house Christie's in the Supreme Court of Manhattan. Vavra, who identified himself as a legal heir to Grünbaum's art collection, requested that Christie's disclose documentation relating to works by Egon Schiele formerly belonging to the collection. The petition sought access to sales contracts, appraisals, expert reports, correspondence, and information about current ownership in order to support potential restitution claims.

According to a report by Artnews, Christie's opposed the request, stating that it adheres to strict legal and ethical standards in matters of provenance research and restitution. The auction house had previously handled sales of six Schiele works connected to the collection, each reportedly achieving prices of around US $1 million. Court filings indicated that Christie's was also approached by a Swiss family seeking to collaborate with Grünbaum's heirs in the sale of three additional Schiele paintings. Two of these works were described by Christie's experts as among the most significant Schieles they had encountered.

The filing, which was linked from the Artnews report on the case, also referenced tensions among Grünbaum's heirs over legal representation. An email cited in the petition, sent to attorney Raymond Dowd, informed him that while he represented Milos Vavra, he was not authorised to act on behalf of the Trustees of the Leon Fischer Trust for the Life and Work of Fritz Grünbaum, nor to present himself as counsel for all heirs collectively.

== Selected works ==
- Phryne (Operetta by Edmund Eysler, 1906, with Robert Bodanzky)
- Peter und Paul reisen ins Schlaraffenland (operetta by Franz Lehár, 1906, with Bodanzky)
- Die Dollarprinzessin (Operetta by Leo Fall, 1907, with A. M. Willner)
  - The Dollar Princess (Operetta by Leo Fall, 1909, with A. M. Willner, English adaptation by Basil Hood)
- Der Liebeswalzer (Operetta by Karl Michael Ziehrer, 1908, with Robert Bodanzky)
- Der Zigeunerprimas (Operetta by Emmerich Kálmán, 1912, with Julius Wilhelm)
- Sturmidyll (Comedy, 1914, with Wilhelm Sterk)
- Der Favorit (Operetta by Robert Stolz, with Wilhelm Sterk, 1916)
- Die Csikósbaroness (Operetta by Georg Jarno, 1920)
- Dorine und der Zufall (Musical comedy by Jean Gilbert, 1922, with Wilhelm Sterk)
- Traumexpress (Operetta by Robert Katscher, 1931, with Karl Farkas)
- Die Schöpfung (Cabaret)
- Die Hölle im Himmel (Cabaret)
- Die Schöpfung und andere Kabarettstücke, Vienna/Munich: Löcker Verlag, 1984, ISBN 3-85409-071-4
- Der leise Weise. Gedichte und Monologue aus dem Repertoire, ed. Hans Veigl, Vienna, 1992, ISBN 3-218-00552-3
- Hallo, hier Grünbaum!, Vienna/Munich: Löcker Verlag, 2001, ISBN 3-85409-330-6

=== Lyrics ===
- "Draußen in Schönbrunn"
- "Ich hab das Fräuln Helen baden sehn"

== Filmography ==
- Rich, Young and Beautiful, directed by Fritz Freisler (1928, based on the musical comedy Dorine und der Zufall)
- The Gypsy Chief, directed by Carl Wilhelm (1929, based on the operetta Der Zigeunerprimas)
- Die Csikósbaroness, directed by Jacob Fleck and Luise Fleck (1930, based on the operetta Die Csikósbaroness)

=== Screenwriter ===
- Everyone Asks for Erika, directed by Frederic Zelnik (1931)
- Liebeskommando, directed by Géza von Bolváry (1931)
- Ein Lied, ein Kuss, ein Mädel, directed by Géza von Bolváry (1932)

=== Actor ===
- The Theft of the Mona Lisa (1931)
- My Wife, the Impostor (1931), as Silbermann
- The Virtuous Sinner (1931), as Kalapka
- Poor as a Church Mouse (1931), as Schünzl
- For Once I'd Like to Have No Troubles (1932)
- Ein Lied, ein Kuss, ein Mädel (1932), as Adolph Münzer
- Man Without a Name (1932), as Erwin Gablinky
- Things Are Getting Better Already (1932), as Justizrat Feldacker
- Girls to Marry (1932), as Sigurd Bernstein

== Sources ==
- Christoph Wagner-Trenkwitz and Marie-Theres Arnbom, Grüß mich Gott! Fritz Grünbaum 1880–1941, Brandstätter, 2005, ISBN 3-85498-393-X
- Viktor Rotthaler, "Frühling für Hitler. Dani Levys historische Vorbilder", Frankfurter Rundschau, 13 January 2007, p. 15
- Das Cabaret ist mein Ruin – 2 CDs (CD1: Chansons, Conferencen und Texte von (und mit) Fritz Grünbaum. CD2: Feature über Fritz Grünbaum von Volker Kühn), Ed. Mnemosyne, Neckargemünd/Vienna: Verl. für Alte Hüte & Neue Medien, February 2005, ISBN 3-934012-23-X
- Hans Veigl, "Entwürfe für ein Grünbaum-Monument. Fritz Grünbaum und das Wiener Kabarett", Graz/Vienna: ÖKA, 2001, ISBN 3-9501427-0-3
- Ernst Federn, "Fritz Grünbaums 60. Geburtstag im Konzentrationslager", in: Roland Kaufhold, ed., Versuche zur Psychologie des Terrors, Gießen: Psychosozial-Verlag, 1999, pp. 95–97.

== See also ==
- List of claims for restitution for Nazi-looted art
- The Holocaust in Austria
