= A Tango for You =

1930 film directed by Géza von Bolváry

- Willi Forst (centre) in a still from the film
- Directed by: Géza von Bolváry
- Written by: Walter Reisch
- Starring: Willi Forst; Fee Malten; Paul Otto
- Cinematography: Willy Goldberger
- Music by: Robert Stolz
- Production company: Deutsche Lichtspiel-Syndikat
- Distributed by: Deutsche Lichtspiel-Syndikat
- Release date: 1 August 1930
- Running time: 102 minutes
- Country: Germany
- Language: German

A Tango for You (German: Ein Tango für Dich) is a 1930 German musical film directed by Géza von Bolváry and starring Willi Forst, Fee Malten, and Paul Otto.

The film's sets were designed by the art director Robert Neppach.

== Cast ==
- Willi Forst as Jimmy Bolt, ein unberühmter Jazzsänger
- Fee Malten as Mady Smith
- Paul Otto as Maxim Merblanc, ein berühmter Jazzsänger
- Oskar Karlweis as Flooch, Impresario
- Aenne Goerling as Varieté-Direktorin, genannt 'der Lindwurm'
- Ernő Verebes as Alfonso di Bei Juanos, Tangokapellmeister
- Paul Vincenti as Mac Lioth, Jazzkapellmeister
- Mathilde Sussin as Pensionatvorsteherin
- Edith Hermann-Roeder as Tänzerin
- Tibor Halmay as Tänzer
- Juan Llossas as Tango-Kapellmeister
- Lewis Ruth as Kapellmeister

== Bibliography ==
- Bock, Hans-Michael; Bergfelder, Tim, eds. (2009). The Concise Cinegraph: Encyclopaedia of German Cinema. New York: Berghahn Books. ISBN 978-1-57181-655-9.
