= Tibor Halmay =

Hungarian actor (1894–1944)

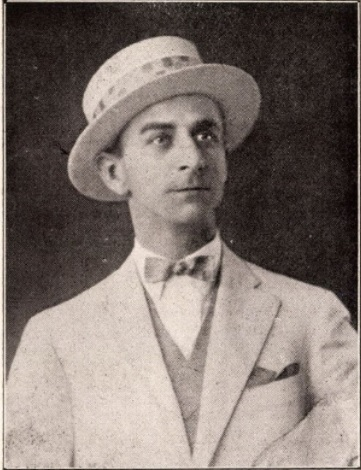
- Born: 20 December 1894; Nagyszentmiklós, Austria-Hungary
- Died: 3 February 1944 (aged 49); Budapest, Hungary
- Other name: Tibor von Halmay
- Occupation: Actor
- Years active: 1923-1944 (film)

Tibor Halmay (20 December 1894 – 2 November 1944) was a Hungarian stage and film actor. He was born in the Austro-Hungarian Empire, and appeared in a mixture of German and Hungarian films during his career. He is sometimes credited as Tibor von Halmay.

== Selected filmography ==
- My Daughter's Tutor (1929)
- A Tango for You (1930)
- Two Hearts in Waltz Time (1930)
- The Forester's Daughter (1931)
- Her Majesty the Barmaid (1931)
- The Girl and the Boy (1931)
- The Merry Wives of Vienna (1931)
- The Wrong Husband (1931)
- The Old Scoundrel (1932)
- Gitta Discovers Her Heart (1932)
- The Naked Truth (1932)
- Two Hearts Beat as One (1932)
- And the Plains Are Gleaming (1933)
- The Racokzi March (1933)
- Spring Parade (1934)
- A Precocious Girl (1934)
- Everything for the Woman (1934)
- Leap into Bliss (1934)
- The Last Waltz (1934)
- Dream Love (1935)
- Dreams of Love (1935)
- Where the Lark Sings (1936)
- Rendezvous in Vienna (1936)
- Escape to the Adriatic (1937)
- The Unexcused Hour (1937)
- Sister Maria (1937)
- Roxy and the Wonderteam (1938)
- Young Noszty and Mary Toth (1938)
- Linen from Ireland (1939)
- Hotel Sacher (1939)
- Woman Made to Measure (1940)
- Temptation (1942)
- A Heart Stops Beating (1942)
- Rózsa Nemes (1943)
- Mask in Blue (1943)
- Carnival of Love (1943)
- A Lover of the Theatre (1944)
- Orient Express (1944)

== Bibliography ==
- Robert von Dassanowsky. Austrian Cinema: A History. McFarland, 2005.
