= The Men Around Lucy =

1931 film

- Directed by: Alexander Korda
- Written by: Douglas Z. Doty; Benno Vigny; Harry d'Abbadie d'Arrast
- Produced by: Alexander Korda
- Starring: Liane Haid; Walter Rilla; Oskar Karlweis
- Cinematography: Harry Stradling Sr.
- Edited by: Harold Young
- Music by: Jane Bos; Paul Maye; Ray Noble; G. Zoka
- Production company: Paramount Pictures
- Distributed by: Parufamet
- Release date: November 3, 1931
- Running time: 75 minutes
- Country: United States
- Language: German

The Men Around Lucy (German: Die Männer um Lucie) is a 1931 German-language American drama film directed and produced by Alexander Korda and starring Liane Haid, Walter Rilla and Oskar Karlweis. Made at the Joinville Studios in Paris, it is one of several multi-language versions of the 1930 film Laughter, with distribution in Germany by UFA as part of the Parufamet agreement. The movie is considered lost.

== Cast ==
- Liane Haid as Lucie
- Walter Rilla as Robert
- Oskar Karlweis as Karl
- Trude Hesterberg as Lola
- Lien Deyers as Daisy
- Ernst Stahl-Nachbaur as Prunier
- Charles Puffy as Wirt
- Jaro Fürth as Bettler
- Eugen Jensen as Oberkellner

== Bibliography ==
- Cheryl Krasnick Warsh & Dan Malleck. Consuming Modernity: Gendered Behaviour and Consumerism before the Baby Boom. UBC Press, 2013.
