= Rudolf Raimann =

Hungarian composer (1861–1913)

Rudolf Raimann (7 May 1861, Veszprém, Hungary – 26 September 1913, Vienna, Austria) was a Hungarian composer. For many years he worked as the chief composer and music director to Prince Esterházy. He composed 15 operas and operettas for the court, of which Enoch Arden is considered his best work. He also wrote numerous art songs and songs for the piano-forte.

== Selected operas ==
- Enoch Arden, performed on 8 May 1894 in Budapest
- Das Wäschermädel, performed in Vienna on 19 April 1905
- Paula macht alles, performed in Vienna on 27 March 1909
- Die Frau Gretl, performed in Vienna on 7 April 1911
- Unser Stammhalter, performed on 15 November 1912 in Vienna
- Er und seine Schwester, performed on 1 February 1914 in Mannheim

== Sources ==
- The Oxford Dictionary of Opera, by John Warrack and Ewan West (1992), ISBN 0-19-869164-5
- Opera Glass
