= Podivín =

- Town
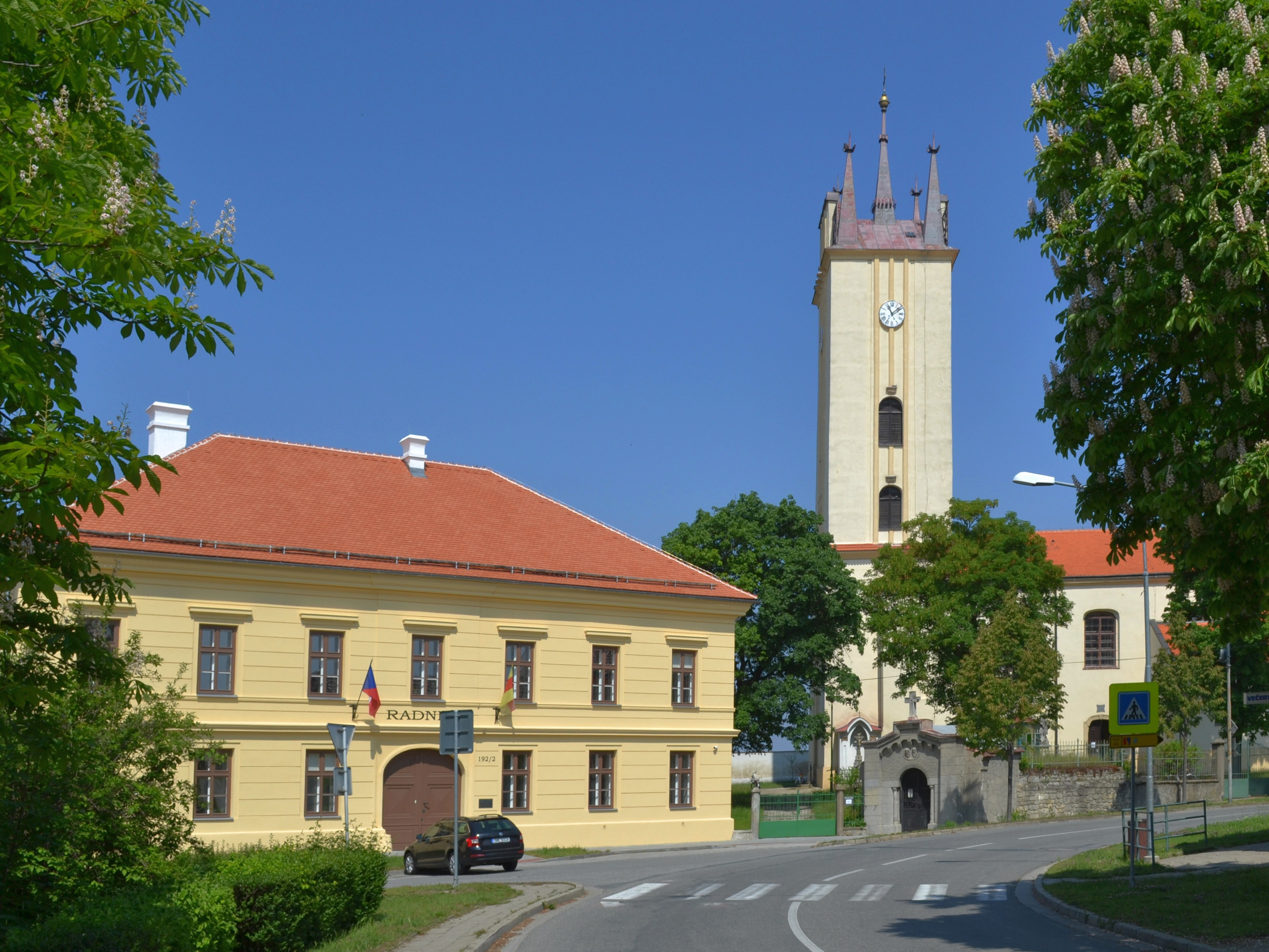
- Town hall and Church of Saints Peter and Paul

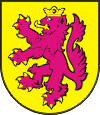
- Flag Coat of arms

- Location in the Czech Republic
- Coordinates: 48°49′32″N 16°50′54″E
- Country: Czech Republic
- Region: South Moravian
- District: Břeclav
- First mentioned: 1062

Government
  - Mayor: Martin Důbrava

Area
  - Total: 17.75 km^{2} (6.85 sq mi)
- Elevation: 165 m (541 ft)

Population (2026-01-01)
  - Total: 2,912
  - Density: 164.1/km^{2} (424.9/sq mi)
- Time zone: UTC+1 (CET)
  - Summer (DST): UTC+2 (CEST)
- Postal code: 691 45
- Website: www.podivin.cz

Podivín (Czech pronunciation: [ˈpoɟɪviːn]; German: Kostel) is a town in Břeclav District in the South Moravian Region of the Czech Republic. It has about 2,900 inhabitants.

== Geography ==
Podivín is located about 9 kilometres (6 mi) north of Břeclav and 45 km (28 mi) southeast of Brno. It lies in a flat agricultural landscape in the Lower Morava Valley. The Thaya River flows through the southern part of the municipal territory. The Trkmanka River flows along the western border and then joins the Thaya.

== History ==
The first written mention of Podivín is in Chronica Boemorum and is related to the years 1062–1067. From the 1520s until their expulsion in 1622, the Anabaptist community existed in the town. The Jewish community was first documented in 1619, when there were 140 Jews there.

== Demographics ==
Historical population

Year	Pop.	±%
1869	2,225	—
1880	2,590	+16.4%
1890	2,517	−2.8%
1900	2,750	+9.3%
1910	2,848	+3.6%

Year	Pop.	±%
1921	2,809	−1.4%
1930	2,549	−9.3%
1950	2,404	−5.7%
1961	2,675	+11.3%
1970	2,701	+1.0%

Year	Pop.	±%
1980	2,849	+5.5%
1991	2,848	−0.0%
2001	2,887	+1.4%
2011	2,874	−0.5%
2021	2,887	+0.5%

Source: Censuses

== Transport ==
The D2 motorway (part of the European route E65) from Brno to Břeclav runs through the municipal territory.

Podivín is located on the Brno–Staré Město railway line.

== Sights ==
The main landmark of Podivín is the Church of Saints Peter and Paul. It is a Gothic church, rebuilt into its present form in 1791. Part of the enclosure wall of the church is the Chapel of Saints Cyril and Methodius. It was built in 1857 on the site of a medieval chapel.

The Jewish cemetery consists of 1,000 tombs, the oldest of which is from 1694. The ceremonial hall dates from the 19th century.

== Notable people ==
- Vit Klemes (1932–2010), Czech-Canadian hydrologist
- Jan Kostrhun (1942–2022), politician
