= Willi Ostermann =

German composer and lyricist (1876–1936)

Wilhelm "Willi" Ostermann (1 October 1876 – 6 August 1936) was a lyricist, composer and singer of carnival songs and songs about Cologne, primarily in the German dialect of Kölsch. The tune Homesick for Cologne is counted amongst his most famous pieces.

In the year 1949, a monument was erected to commemorate the life and works of Willi Ostermann in the Seven Mountains' Nightingale Valley of Königswinter.

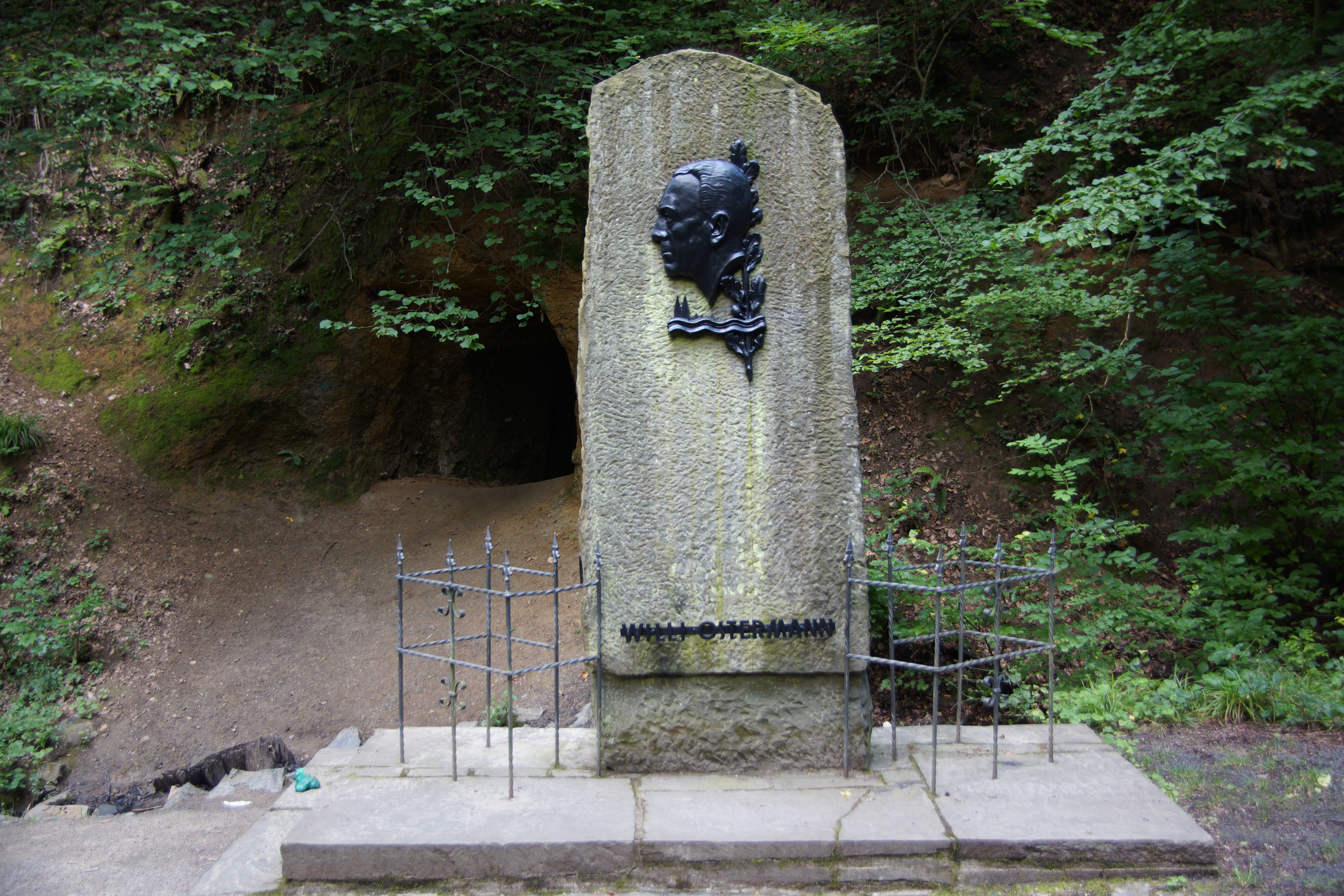
Willi Ostermann Memorial in Königswinter
