= Holocaust Expropriated Art Recovery Act of 2016 =

- Long title: An Act to provide the victims of Holocaust-era persecution and their heirs a fair opportunity to recover works of art confiscated or misappropriated by the Nazis.
- Enacted by: the 114th United States Congress
- Effective: December 16, 2016

Citations
- Public law: Pub. L. 114–308 (text) (PDF)

Legislative history
- Committee consideration by House Judiciary Committee; Signed into law by President Barack Obama on

The Holocaust Expropriated Art Recovery Act of 2016 is an Act of Congress that became law in 2016. It was intended to provide victims of Nazi persecution (and their heirs) opportunity to recover works of art confiscated or misappropriated by the Nazis. A key feature was to enable Holocaust survivors and heirs to access U.S. courts and have their claims decided on the true facts and merits - instead of being dismissed on technicalities.

In 2018, a New York judge awarded two Nazi-looted drawings "to the heirs of an Austrian Holocaust victim". According to the BBC, the drawings, "Woman Hiding Her Face" and "Woman in a Black Pinafore", by Egon Schiele, "will go to the heirs" of Fritz Grünbaum, who was killed in the Dachau concentration camp in 1941. Art dealer Richard Nagy claimed to be the rightful owner to the works, however the Manhattan state court ruled against him, citing this precise Act.

In May 2025 a new HEAR Act Improvements law was introduced and it was passed by the House in 2025 and by the Senate in March of 2026. "The new bill eliminates the 2026 “sunset clause,” which would have ended the protections offered by the HEAR Act. It also makes clear that as long as a family files within six years of discovering their artwork’s location, their case cannot be dismissed simply because of how much time has passed."

== See also ==
- List of claims for restitution for Nazi-looted art
- Holocaust denial
- Aryanization
