= Two Hearts in Waltz Time (1930 film) =

1930 German musical film

- Directed by: Géza von Bolváry
- Written by: Walter Reisch; Franz Schulz; Joe Young
- Produced by: Julius Haimann
- Starring: Walter Janssen; Oskar Karlweis; Willi Forst
- Cinematography: Max Brink; Willy Goldberger
- Music by: Robert Stolz
- Production company: Deutsches Lichtspiel-Syndikat
- Distributed by: Deutsches Lichtspiel-Syndikat
- Release date: 13 March 1930
- Running time: 96 minutes
- Country: Germany
- Language: German

Two Hearts in Waltz Time (Original title: Zwei Herzen im ¾ Takt or Zwei Herzen im Dreivierteltakt, literally Two Hearts in ¾ Time) is a 1930 German film directed by Géza von Bolváry and starring Irene Eisinger, Walter Janssen, Oskar Karlweis, Willi Forst, Gretl Theimer, and S.Z. Sakall. It is an operetta written directly for the screen, with music by Robert Stolz.

The film's sets were designed by the art director Robert Neppach.

== Plot ==
Nicki and Vicki, two librettists who also happen to be brothers, are presently in collaboration with composer Toni. All too aware of Toni's amorous escapades, Nicki and Vicki try to keep the existence of their pretty sister Hedi a secret. Suffering from an acute case of writer's block (he has yet to find an inspiration for his next production), Toni throws a huge party, which is boycotted by his friends and associates so that he'll keep his mind on his work. The only guest who does show up is uninvited Hedi, who turns out to be inspiration enough for ten operettas.

== Songs ==
- Zwei Herzen im ¾ Takt
- In deinen Augen liegt das Herz von Wien!
- Auch du wirst mich einmal betrügen!
- In Wien, wo der Wein und der Walzer blüht

== Cast ==
- Walter Janssen as Toni Hofer, operetta composer
- Oskar Karlweis as Nicky Mahler, librettist
- Willi Forst as Vicky Mahler, librettist
- Gretl Theimer as Hedi
- Irene Eisinger as Anni Lohmeier, operetta diva
- S. Z. Sakall as theatre director
- Karl Etlinger as cashier Schlesinger
- Paul Morgan as notary Novotny
- Paul Hörbiger as Ferdinand, coachman
- Tibor Halmay as comic
- August Vockau as Weigl, general servant at Hofer's
- Gert Bloem as Franz Schubert

== Other ==
Released under its English language title in October 1930, Two Hearts in Waltz Time was the first foreign language film to be released with subtitles in the United States. A stage musical with almost unchanged music and the same title, subtitled Der verlorene Walzer (The Lost Waltz) premiered on 30 September 1933 at the Stadttheater Zürich (today Zurich Opera House).
