= Carl Karlweis =

Austrian dramatist and short story writer

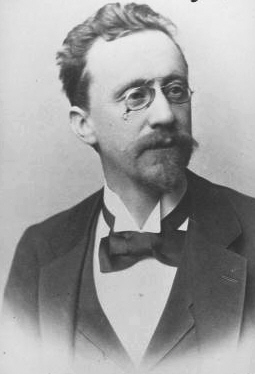
Carl Karlweis (1897)

Carl Karlweis, originally Karl Weiss (23 November 1850, in Vienna – 27 October 1901, in Vienna) was an Austrian dramatist and short story writer. Of Jewish ancestry, he converted to Protestantism in 1889.

== Biography ==
He was originally an employee of the Imperial Royal Privileged Austrian State Railway Company in Graz. He switched to the Galician Railway of Archduke Charles Louis in 1869. He was already active as a writer by 1876, when he was works secretary for the Graz-Köflacher Train and Bus Service. From 1891, he was the Chief Inspector for the Austrian Southern Railway Company.

He wrote numerous short tales and novels, some in the Viennese dialect. Together with Hermann Bahr and Vinzenz Chiavacci, he wrote comedies and folk plays, which were performed at the Volkstheater. In 1896, his play Der kleine Mann (The Little Man) was awarded the Raimund-Preis for playwrights; named in honor of the actor and dramatist, Ferdinand Raimund.

For many years he suffered from a serious stomach problem. What would turn out to be his last play, The New Simson, was written in 1901 and presented at the Volkstheater, with Franz Tewele and Helene Odilon in the lead roles. It was a major success. He died a few months later, after taking the "cure" at the spa in Lovran.

He was married to Emilie, née Kraus (1864-1938). They had two children; Marta, who became a writer, and Oskar, a stage and film actor.

In 1919, a street in Vienna's Währing district was named after him.
