= Georg Jarno =

Hungarian composer (1868–1920)

Georg Jarno (3 June 1868 – 24 May 1920) was a Hungarian composer, mainly of operettas.

== Biography ==
Jarno was born in Buda. After he finished his studies in Budapest, he worked as Theaterkapellmeister in Bremen, Gera, Halle, Saxony-Anhalt, Metz, Liegnitz, Chemnitz and Magdeburg, and also as opera director in Bad Kissingen, before settling in Vienna as a freelance composer. Before 1903, Jarno's name was György Cohner. He died in Breslau (now Wrocław, Poland), and is buried in the New Jewish Cemetery (field 17), found 16 June 2026 by ASF volunteers.

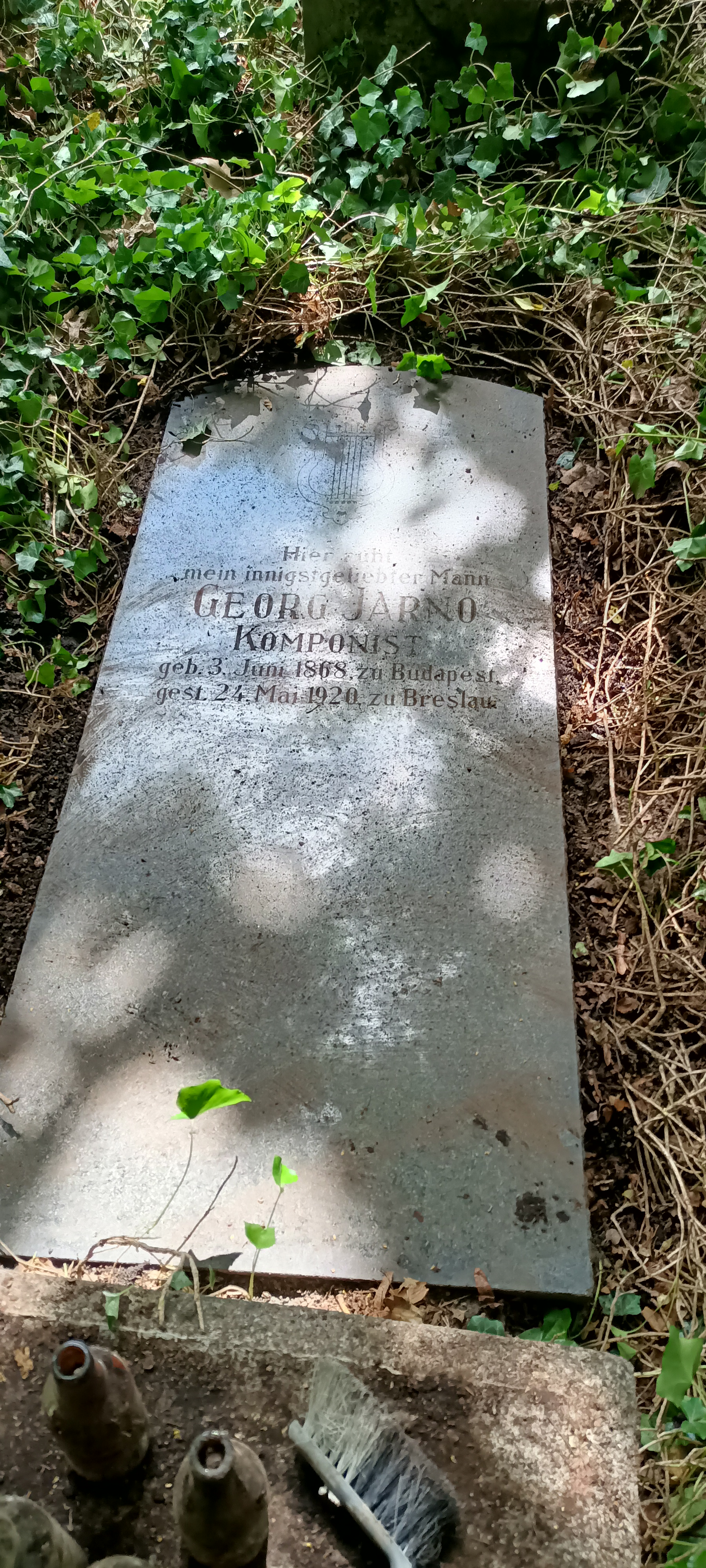
Gravestone Georg Jarno New Jewish Cementry Wroclaw

== Career ==
Jarno's greatest successes were Die Försterchristl (1907) and Das Musikantenmädel (1910). His operettas Das Farmermädchen and Jungfer Sonnenschein were well received, whereas Die Marine-Gustl, Mein Annerl, Der Goldfisch and Die Csikosbaroness could muster only passing interest. Much of the success of his works was due to the distinguished presentation of their title roles by his brother's (Joseph Jarno) wife, the highly popular actress and soubrette Hansi Niese.

He loved to introduce historically well known persons into his operettas; Kaiser Joseph II in Die Försterchristl, Prince Eugene of Savoy in Jungfer Sonnenschein, Joseph Haydn in Das Musikantenmädel.

Before operettas, he wrote three operas: Die schwarze Kaschka (1895), Der Richter von Zalamea (1899) based on Calderon's El alcalde de Zalamea, and Der zerbrochne Krug (1903) based on Heinrich von Kleist's play; none prevailed.

His main success, Die Försterchristl, had a run of 64 performances at Broadway's Herald Square Theatre in 1910/11 under the title The Girl and the Kaiser.

== Stage works ==
Title	Libretto	Premiere	
Operas
Der schwarze Kaschka; Opera in 4 acts	Viktor Blüthgen	12 May 1895	Breslau
Der Richter von Zalamea; Opera in 4 acts	Viktor Blüthgen based on Calderón	1899	Breslau
Der zerbrochene Krug; Comic opera in 3 acts revised as Johanniszauber	Heinrich Lee based on Kleist's The Broken Jug	1903 1911	Hamburg Hamburg
Operettas
Der Goldfisch	Richard Jäger	1907	Breslau
Die Försterchristl	Bernhard Buchbinder	17 December 1907	Vienna; Theater in der Josefstadt
Das Musikantenmädel	Bernhard Buchbinder	12 February 1910	Vienna; Theater in der Josefstadt
Die Marine-Gustl	Bernhard Buchbinder	1912	Vienna
Das Farmermädchen	Georg Okonkowski	22 March 1913	Berlin
Mein Annerl	Fritz Grünbaum/ Wilhelm Sterk	1916	Vienna
Jungfer Sonnenschein	Bernhard Buchbinder	1918	Hamburg
Die Csikosbaroneß	Fritz Grünbaum	1919	Hamburg

== Bibliography ==
- Vernik-Eibl, Sabine (2011). Leben und Werk der Komponisten Georg Jarno und Leo Ascher (PDF) (Dr. phil.) (in German). University of Vienna.
