= Oskar Karlweis =

Austrian actor

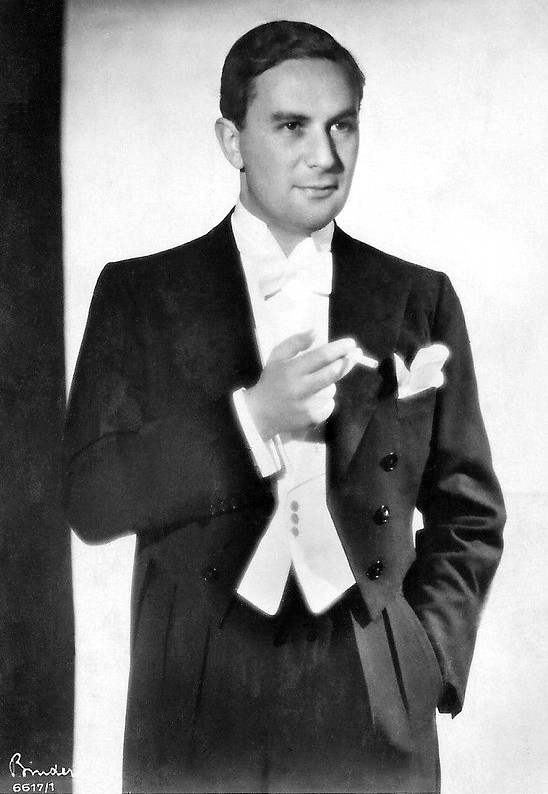
- Born: 10 July 1894; Hinterbrühl, Austria-Hungary
- Died: 24 January 1956 (aged 61); New York City, US
- Resting place: Matzleinsdorf Protestant Cemetery, Austria
- Occupation: Actor
- Years active: 1912–1956
- Spouse: Ninon Tallon (1946–1956; his death)

Oskar Leopold Karlweis (often credited Oscar Karlweis; 10 July 1894 – 24 January 1956) was an Austrian-American stage and film actor, active internationally in both the silent as well as the sound era.

== Career ==
Born in Hinterbrühl, Austria-Hungary, he was the son of playwright Carl Karlweis and younger brother of the writer Marta Karlweis. Karlweis abandoned his law studies for the stage, first for eight years at Vienna's Stadttheater. After service in World War I, he was active with Max Reinhardt's Theater in der Josefstadt in Vienna, followed by engagements at various theaters in Munich and Vienna, and then to the Berlin stage where he had a popular following playing singing and dancing roles, including as Prinz Orlofsky in Die Fledermaus. His general manner was humorous, charming, naive, and cheerful.

Singing with Bernard Etté und sein Orchester, he recorded the song "Sonny Boy" which was released on the Kristal label in 1929.

In Berlin between 1930 and 1933 he worked as a recording artist and acted in more than a dozen German light comedy and musical films, most famously as one of Lilian Harvey's suitors in the hugely successful operetta film The Three from the Filling Station.

With Hitler's rise to power in 1933, Karlweis, who was Jewish, returned to the Austrian stage; but with the Nazi Anschluss in 1938 he was again forced to flee, first to Switzerland and then Paris where, at both locations, he took to the stage with fellow Austrian law school dropout, writer/director, and cabaret performer Karl Farkas. When German forces took Paris in 1940, Karlweis, along with his friend Austrian writer Friedrich Torberg, fled via Spain to Portugal, whence they made their way to New York.

Not knowing English, Karlweis was at first limited to acting in German emmigré productions, but he soon got his English legs and appeared in eight Broadway shows in the early 1940s, including the title role in Franz Werfel's long-running "Jacobowsky and the Colonel," garnering outstanding reviews.

In the early 1950s Karlweis played supporting roles in TV productions and in several Hollywood and European films. He died in 1956 of a heart attack in New York, and is interred at the Matzleinsdorf Protestant Cemetery in Vienna.

== Personal life ==
In 1946, Karlweis married theatrical and film producer Ninon Tallon, the niece of three-time prime minister of France Édouard Herriot. She continued to use his surname professionally until after his death.

== Selected filmography ==
- The Bohemian Dancer (1926)
- Give Me Life (1928)
- Love in the Cowshed (1928), as Wedelski, Oberleutnant a.D.
- Two Hearts in Waltz Time (1930), as Nicky Mahler
- A Tango for You (1930), as Flooch
- The Three from the Filling Station (1930), as Kurt
- Dolly Gets Ahead (1930), as Fred Halton
- The Firm Gets Married (1931), as Solly Friedländer
- The Forester's Daughter (1931), as Wolfgang Amadeus Mozart
- Der Tanzhusar (1931), as Turi Weidinger
- Mamsell Nitouche (1931), as Célestin
- The Men Around Lucy (1931), as Robert
- The Concert (1931), as Doctor Jura
- The Naked Truth (1932)
- Spell of the Looking Glass (1932), as Menzel
- Three on a Honeymoon (1932), as Heinz Schaller
- The Gentleman from Maxim's (1933), as Werner Radke
- No Day Without You (1933), as Leo
- Today Is the Day (1933), as Peter Schlemm
- Voices of Spring (1933), as Franz Waldmüller
- Last Love (1935), as Teddy Langhammer
- Everything for the Company (1935), as Otto Sonndorfer
- St. Benny the Dip (1951), as Mr. Kovacs
- 5 Fingers (1952), as Moyzisch
- Anything Can Happen (1952), as Uncle Besso
- Tonight We Sing (1953), as Benjamin Golder
- The Juggler (1953), as Willy Schmidt
- Dutch Girl (1953), as Professor Schmidtchen
- Meet Me in Las Vegas (1956), as Lotzi

== Bibliography ==
- Palmer, Jean Michel. Weimar in Exile: The Antifascist Emigration in Europe And America. Verso, 2006.
- Traubner, Richard. Operetta: A Theatrical History. Psychology Press, 2003.
- Weniger, Kay: 'Es wird im Leben dir mehr genommen als gegeben ...' Lexikon der aus Deutschland und Österreich emigrierten Filmschaffenden 1933 bis 1945: Eine Gesamtübersicht (Hamburg: ACABUS Verlag, 2011). ISBN 3862821420, 9783862821426
