= Bernhard Buchbinder =

Austro-Hungarian actor, journalist and writer

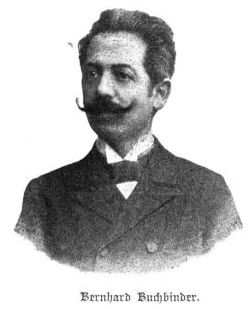
Bernhard Buchbinder (ca. 1896)

Bernhard Ludwig Buchbinder (7 July or 20 September 1849 – 24 June 1922), pseudonym Gustav Klinger, was an Austro-Hungarian actor, journalist and writer. His best-known operetta libretto remains Die Försterchristl.

== Career ==
Buchbinder was born in Budapest, a part of the Austrian Empire. According to different sources, his date of birth is 7 July or 20 September 1849. Initially, he was an actor, later he became the publisher of the humorous fiction Das kleine Journal which is published weekly in Budapest. He moved to Vienna in 1887 and lived there as a feature writer; among others, he wrote for the Neues Wiener Journal. Besides his journalistic activity Buchbinder wrote novels, folk plays and especially operetta libretti in Viennese style.

Buchbinder died in Vienna.

== Works ==
- Der Satan vom Neugebäude. Novel (1884)
- Der Sänger von Palermo. 3 acts operette (1888)
- Die Teufelsglocke. 3 acts opera (1891)
- Eine Wiener Theaterprinzessin. Novel (1894)
- Fräulein Hexe. 3 acts operette (together with Alfred Maria Willner)
- Die Flüchtlinge. 3 acts Opéra comique
- Die Küchen Comtesse. Farce with singing in 3 acts
- Die Dame vom Zirkus. Operette
- Der Kibitz. Farce with singing in 3 acts
- Der Schmetterling. 3 acts operette (together with Alfred Maria Willner), 1896
- Die Göttin der Vernunft. Operette (together with Alfred Maria Willner), 1897 Music by Johann Strauss II.
- Leute von Heute. farce with singing in 3 acts (1899) (music by Joseph Hellmesberger Jr.)
- Er und seine Schwester. Farce with singing in 4 scenes (1902) (music by Rudolf Raimann)
- Der Musikant und sein Weib. Folk play with song in 4 acts (1903)
- Das Wäschermädel. Operette (1905)
- Der Schusterbub. Farce with singing in 4 scenes (1906)
- Die Försterchristl. 3 acts operette (1907)
- Paula macht alles. Operetten-Posse in 4 Akten (1909)
- Das Musikantenmädel. 3 acts operette (1910)
- Das neue Mädchen. 3 acts vaudeville (1911)
- Die Frau Gretl. Farce with singing in 3 acts (1911)
- Die Marie-Gustl. Operette (1912)
- Die Wundermühle. Possenspiel in 3 acts (1914)
- Graf Habenichts. 3 acts operette (around 1917)
- Jungfer Sonnenschein. Operette (1918)
- Zum goldenen Segen. Folk play with song in 3 acts (1921)

== Bibliography ==
- Felix Czeike (editor): Buchbinder Bernhard Ludwig. In: Historisches Lexikon Wien. Band 1, Kremayr & Scheriau, Wien 1992, ISBN 3-218-00543-4.
- "Buchbinder Bernhard". In: Österreichisches Biographisches Lexikon 1815–1950 (ÖBL). Vol. 1, Austrian Academy of Sciences, Vienna 1957, p. 123.
- Buchbinder, Bernhard. In Lexikon deutsch-jüdischer Autoren. Volume 4: Brech–Carle. Hrsg. vom Archiv Bibliographia Judaica. Saur, München 1996, ISBN 3-598-22684-5, p. 310–315.
