= List of German films of 1919 =

This is a list of the most notable films produced in the Cinema of Germany in 1919.

| Title | Director | Cast | Genre | Notes |
|---|---|---|---|---|
1919
| Alkohol | Ewald André Dupont, Alfred Lind | Wilhelm Diegelmann, Ernst Rückert | Drama | |
| Alraune und der Golem | Nils Olaf Chrisander | | | Lost, possibly never made |
| Animated Cards | Berthold Bartosch | | animation | |
| Anita Jo | Dimitri Buchowetzki | Bernhard Goetzke, Hanni Weisse | Crime | |
| The Apache of Marseilles | Ewald André Dupont | Max Landa, Hanni Weisse, Reinhold Schünzel | Thriller | |
| Die Arche | Richard Oswald | Leo Connard, Eva Speyer, Georg Heinrich Schnell | | |
| Bettler GmbH | Alwin Neuß | Paul Otto, Lil Dagover | Silent | |
| Bilder von der Spartakistenherrschaft in München | | | documentary | Available online here |
| Blonde Poison | Hubert Moest | Hedda Vernon, Paul Hartmann, Olga Engl | Drama | |
| The Boy in Blue | Friedrich Wilhelm Murnau | Ernst Hofmann, Georg John, Margit Barnay | Drama | |
| Charlotte Corday | Frederic Zelnik | Lya Mara, Hermann Vallentin | Historical | |
| Child on the Open Road | Richard Eichberg | Fred Goebel, Hermann Vallentin | Silent | |
| Countess Doddy | Georg Jacoby | Pola Negri, Harry Liedtke | Drama | |
| Communism | Berthold Bartosch | | animation | |
| The Carousel of Life | Georg Jacoby | Pola Negri, Harry Liedtke | Drama | |
| The Dagger of Malaya | Léo Lasko | Carl Auen, Bernhard Goetzke, Victor Janson | Crime | |
| The Dance of Death | Otto Rippert | Werner Krauss, Sascha Gura | Horror | |
| The Dancer | Carl Froelich | Lil Dagover, Walter Janssen | | |
| The Derby | Ewald André Dupont | Max Landa, Hermann Picha, Hanni Weisse | Mystery | |
| The Devil and the Madonna | Carl Boese | Gertrude Welcker, Magnus Stifter, Reinhold Schünzel | Drama | |
| The Doll | Ernst Lubitsch | Ossi Oswalda, Victor Janson, Hermann Thimig | Comedy | |
| During My Apprenticeship | Hubert Moest | Hedda Vernon, Reinhold Schünzel, Wilhelm Diegelmann | Drama | |
| The Duty to Live | Carl Wilhelm | Magnus Stifter, Margarete Schön, Reinhold Schünzel | Silent | |
| False Start | Georg Alexander | Georg Alexander, Marija Leiko | Silent | |
| Feierlichkeiten anläßlich des Begräbnisses Kurt Eisners | | | documentary | Available online here |
| Different from the Others | Richard Oswald | Conrad Veidt, Leo Connard, Ilse von Tasso | | |
| The Galley Slave | Paul Wegener, Rochus Gliese | Paul Wegener, Lyda Salmonova, Paul Hartmann | Adventure | |
| The Gambler | Willy Zeyn | Käthe Haack, Heinrich Peer | Silent | |
| The Girl and the Men | Manfred Noa | Paul Hartmann, Werner Krauss, Reinhold Schünzel | Silent | |
| Halbblut | Fritz Lang | Carl de Vogt, Ressel Orla | Fantasy | |
| Harakiri | Fritz Lang | Lil Dagover, Paul Biensfeldt, Georg John | Drama | |
| The Heiress of the Count of Monte Cristo | Frederic Zelnik | Lya Mara, Werner Funck | Silent | |
| Her Sport | Rudolf Biebrach | Henny Porten, Georg H. Schnell | Comedy | |
| Der Herr der Liebe | Fritz Lang | Carl de Vogt, Gilda Langer | Drama | Lost film |
| The Howling Wolf | Léo Lasko | Carl Auen, Meinhart Maur, Victor Janson | Crime | |
| Intoxication | Ernst Lubitsch | Asta Nielsen, Alfred Abel | Drama | |
| Die lachende Konkurrenz | Hans Werckmeister | | documentary | |
| The Japanese Woman | Ewald André Dupont | Max Landa; Tzwetta Tzatschewa; Conrad Veidt | Mystery | |
| Jettatore | Richard Eichberg | Lee Parry, Bruno Decarli | Crime | |
| Der Kampf gegen den Erbfeind | Gertrud David | | documentary | |
| Love | Manfred Noa | Reinhold Schünzel, Tzwetta Tzatschewa | Silent | |
| The Love of Marion Bach | Heinrich Bolten-Baeckers | Margarete Neff, Leo Peukert | Drama | |
| The Loves of Käthe Keller | Carl Froelich | Paul Hartmann, Reinhold Schünzel | Drama | |
| Madame Du Barry | Ernst Lubitsch | Pola Negri, Emil Jannings, Harry Liedtke | Historical | |
| Madeleine | Siegfried Philippi | Ria Jende, Hans Albers | Silent | |
| The Man of Action | Victor Janson | Emil Jannings, Hanna Ralph | Silent | |
| Maria Pavlowna | Emil Justitz | Maria Fein, Ernst Rückert, Ernst Stahl-Nachbaur | Drama | |
| The Mask | Ewald André Dupont | Max Landa, Lil Dagover | Crime | |
| The Merry Husband | Léo Lasko | Victor Janson, Marga Köhler | Comedy | |
| Meyer from Berlin (Meyer aus Berlin) | Ernst Lubitsch | Ernst Lubitsch | Comedy | |
| The Monastery of Sendomir | Rudolf Meinert | Ellen Richter, Ernst Deutsch | Drama | |
| My Wife, the Movie Star | Ernst Lubitsch | Ossi Oswalda, Paul Biensfeldt | Comedy | |
| Nerven (Nerves) | Robert Reinert | Eduard von Winterstein, Erna Morena | | IMDb |
| A Night in Paradise | Eugen Burg | Wanda Treumann, Reinhold Schünzel | Silent | |
| Opium | Robert Reinert | Eduard von Winterstein, Sybill Morel, Werner Krauss, Hanna Ralph, Conrad Veidt | | |
| Das Ornament des verliebten Herzens | Lotte Reiniger | | animation | |
| Out of the Depths | Georg Jacoby | Ellen Richter, Olga Engl, Hugo Flink | Drama | |
| The Oyster Princess | Ernst Lubitsch | Ossi Oswalda, Harry Liedtke, Victor Janson | Comedy | |
| The Panther Bride | Léo Lasko | Carl Auen, Victor Janson | Crime | |
| The Peruvian | Alfred Halm | Mady Christians, Reinhold Schünzel, Paul Graetz | Drama | |
| The Plague of Florence | Otto Rippert | Theodor Becker, Marga Kierska | Historical | |
| Prince Cuckoo | Paul Leni | Conrad Veidt, Olga Limburg, Magnus Stifter | Drama | |
| The Princess of Urbino | Paul Legband | Ria Jende, Hans Albers | Silent | |
| Prostitution | Richard Oswald | Conrad Veidt, Reinhold Schünzel, Gussy Holl | Drama | Released in two parts |
| Revenge Is Mine | Alwin Neuß | Paul Otto, Lil Dagover | Silent | |
| Rose Bernd | Alfred Halm | Henny Porten, Emil Jannings, Werner Krauss | Drama | |
| The Rose of Stamboul | Felix Basch, Arthur Wellin | Fritzi Massary, Gustav Botz, Ernst Pittschau | Comedy | |
| Ruth's Two Husbands | Rudolf Biebrach | Henny Porten, Curt Goetz | Silent | |
| The Secret of the American Docks | Ewald André Dupont | Max Landa, Gustav Botz, Reinhold Schünzel | Mystery | |
| The Secret of the Scaffold | Eugen Burg | Wanda Treumann, Oskar Marion | Drama | |
| The Secret of Wera Baranska | Eugen Burg, Franz Porten | Wanda Treumann, Paul Hartmann, Reinhold Schünzel | Drama | |
| Sins of the Parents | Richard Eichberg | Lee Parry, Bruno Decarli | Silent | |
| Die Spinnen, 1. Teil - Der Goldene See (The Spiders, Part 1 - The Golden Lake) | Fritz Lang | Carl de Vogt, Lil Dagover, Ressel Orla | | |
| The Spies | Ewald André Dupont | Max Landa, Johanna Terwin, Hanni Weisse | Crime | |
| The Spinning Ball | Rudolf Biebrach | Ernst Hofmann, Olga Limburg | Drama | |
| Superstition | Georg Jacoby | Ellen Richter, Victor Janson | Drama | |
| The Swabian Maiden | Ernst Lubitsch, Georg Jacoby | Ossi Oswalda, Carl Auen | Comedy | |
| The Teahouse of the Ten Lotus Flowers | Georg Jacoby | Ellen Richter, Victor Janson, Meinhart Maur | Crime | |
| The Toy of the Tsarina | Rudolf Meinert | Ellen Richter, Karl Berger | Historical | |
| Unheimliche Geschichten (Ominous Tales) | Richard Oswald | Conrad Veidt, Anita Berber, Reinhold Schünzel | | |
| Unsere Kinder - unsere Zukunft | | | documentary | |
| Veritas Vincit | Joe May | Mia May, Johannes Riemann, Magnus Stifter | Epic | |
| Victim of Society | Willy Grunwald | Conrad Veidt, Kurt Brenkendorf | Drama | UFA |
| The White Roses of Ravensberg | Nils Olaf Chrisander | Hans Adalbert Schlettow, Robert Scholz | Melodrama | remade in 1929 |
| The Woman at the Crossroads | Georg Jacoby | Pola Negri, Harry Liedtke | Silent | |
| The Woman with Orchids | Otto Rippert | Carl de Vogt, Werner Krauss | Silent | |
