= Hanns Lippmann =

German film producer

- Born: 1890; German Empire
- Died: 4 November 1929 (aged 38–39); Berlin; Weimar Germany
- Occupation: Film producer
- Years active: 1915−1927

Hanns Lippmann (1890–1929) was a German film producer of the silent era. Lippmann set up Gloria-Film AG (later taken over by Ufa), and was closely associated with the director E.A. Dupont.

== Selected filmography ==
- The Golem (1915)
- The Path of Death (1917)
- When the Dead Speak (1917)
- Prince Cuckoo (1919)
- Patience (1920)
- Whitechapel (1920)
- Hearts are Trumps (1920)
- The White Peacock (1920)
- The Vulture Wally (1921)
- Children of Darkness (1921)
- Murder Without Cause (1921)
- The Hunt for the Truth (1921)
- The Conspiracy in Genoa (1921)
- Man Overboard (1921)
- The False Dimitri (1922)
- The Green Manuela (1923)
- Inge Larsen (1923)
- The Wonderful Adventure (1924)
- Man Against Man (1924)
- Love Story (1925)
- When the Young Wine Blossoms (1927)

== Bibliography ==
- St. Pierre, Paul Matthew. E.A. Dupont and his Contribution to British Film: Varieté, Moulin Rouge, Piccadilly, Atlantic, Two Worlds, Cape Forlorn. Fairleigh Dickinson University Press, 2010.
