= The Island of the Lost =

1921 film directed by Urban Gad

- German: Die Insel der Verschollenen
- Directed by: Urban Gad
- Written by: Hans Behrendt; Bobby E. Lüthge
- Based on: The Island of Doctor Moreau by H. G. Wells
- Starring: Alf Blütecher; Hanni Weisse; Erich Kaiser-Titz
- Cinematography: Willy Hameister
- Production company: Corona Filmproduktion
- Distributed by: Terra Film
- Release date: 21 November 1921
- Running time: 90 minutes
- Country: Germany
- Languages: Silent; German intertitles

The Island of the Lost (German: Die Insel der Verschollenen) is a 1921 German silent science fiction film directed by Urban Gad and starring Alf Blütecher, Hanni Weisse and Erich Kaiser-Titz. It is a loose unauthorized adaptation of the 1896 novel The Island of Doctor Moreau by H. G. Wells. Wells was allegedly unaware that this unauthorized version of his novel existed. It was a common practice in the silent era for European filmmakers to produce unauthorized versions of famous works of literature, as evidenced by F. W. Murnau's Der Januskopf (1920) (based upon Robert Louis Stevenson's Dr. Jekyll and Mr. Hyde) and Nosferatu (1922) (based upon Bram Stoker's Dracula).

Thought at one time to have been lost, a print turned up at the Bundesarchiv in Berlin, Germany. The film was only screened in the US for the first time at a "Monster Bash" convention in 2014. Comments from the attendees included the fact that the film was somewhat illogical, and had more emphasis on comedy and romance than horror, but that it offered "memorable glimpses of human-animal hybrids".

Director Gad began his film directing career in his native Denmark where he met and married actress Asta Nielsen, but later they both moved to Germany where he had a successful filmmaking career that lasted until 1927. The film's sets were designed by the art director Robert A. Dietrich. The Wells novel was adapted earlier in 1913 as a silent film called The Island of Terror.

== Plot ==
Dr. Marston leads a small party to a deserted island in the South Seas where they discover a hidden research facility run by a Professor McClelland. The scientist is experimenting with mixing the DNA of animals and humans, with frightening results.

== Cast ==
In alphabetical order

- Fritz Beckmann as Jim
- Hans Behrendt as Pat Quickly
- Alf Blütecher as Robert Marston
- Louis Brody as the king of the island
- Tronier Funder as Dr. Ted Fowlen
- Umberto Guarracino as product from the Professor's secret workshop
- Ludmilla Hell as Evelyn Wilkinson
- Erich Kaiser-Titz as Professor McClelland
- Nien Tso Ling as Fung-Lu
- Hermann Picha as Jess
- Desdemona Schlichting as last survivor
- Hanni Weisse as Jane Crawford
