= Guido Herzfeld =

German actor (1851–1923)

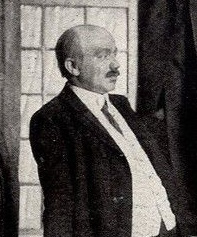
- Herzfeld in 1909
- Born: Guido Kornfeld; 14 August 1851; Karolinenthal, Bohemia, Austrian Empire
- Died: 16 November 1923 (aged 72); Berlin, Germany
- Occupation: Actor
- Years active: 1914–1923 (film)

Guido Herzfeld (born Guido Kornfeld; 14 August 1851 – 16 November 1923) was a German stage and film actor. Herzfeld established himself in the theatre in the nineteenth century. In 1914 he made his film debut and went on to appear in over sixty films before his death.

His notable screen roles include appearances in Ernst Lubitsch's comedy Shoe Palace Pinkus (1916) and Victor Janson's First World War propaganda film The Yellow Ticket (1918). In 1920, he played the lead in Ewald André Dupont's Whitechapel (1920). His final appearance was in the comedy The Grand Duke's Finances (1924).

== Selected filmography ==
- The Canned Bride (1915)
- Shoe Palace Pinkus (1916)
- The Queen's Secretary (1916)
- Lehmann's Honeymoon (1916)
- Europe, General Delivery (1918)
- The Sign of Guilt (1918)
- The Devil (1918)
- Die Arche (1919)
- The Duty to Live (1919)
- The Yellow Death (1920)
- The White Peacock (1920)
- The Red Peacock (1921)
- Man Overboard (1921)
- Wandering Souls (1921)
- Kean (1921)
- Roswolsky's Mistress (1921)
- The Graveyard of the Living (1921)
- Nosferatu (1922)
- Tabitha, Stand Up (1922)
- Sunken Worlds (1922)
- The Blood (1922)
- I.N.R.I. (1923)
- Bob and Mary (1923)
- Carousel (1923)
- The Grand Duke's Finances (1924)

== Bibliography ==
- Jung, Uli & Schatzberg, Walter. Beyond Caligari: The Films of Robert Wiene. Berghahn Books, 1999.
- Prawer, S.S. Between Two Worlds: The Jewish Presence in German and Austrian Film, 1910–1933. Berghahn Books, 2005.
