= The White Peacock (film) =

1920 film directed by Ewald André Dupont

- Belgian poster
- Directed by: Ewald André Dupont
- Written by: Paul Leni; Ewald André Dupont
- Produced by: Hanns Lippmann
- Starring: Guido Herzfeld; Hans Mierendorff; Otto Gebühr; Hermann Wlach
- Cinematography: Karl Hasselmann
- Production company: Gloria-Film
- Distributed by: UFA
- Release date: August 12, 1920
- Country: Germany
- Languages: Silent; German intertitles

The White Peacock (German: Der weisse Pfau) is a 1920 German silent drama film directed by Ewald André Dupont and starring Guido Herzfeld, Hans Mierendorff and Karl Platen. It was shot at the Tempelhof Studios in Berlin. The film's sets were designed by the art directors Paul Leni, Robert A. Dietrich and Otto Moldenhauer

== Synopsis ==
Its plot follows an upper-class theatregoer who falls in love with a gypsy dancer at a music hall in the East End of London, a frequent scenario of Dupont's films at the time.

== Cast ==
- Guido Herzfeld
- Hans Mierendorff
- Karl Platen
- Adolf E. Licho
- Grit Hegesa
- Emil Rameau
- Robert Scholz
- Lore Sello

== Bibliography ==
- Bergfelder, Tim & Cargnelli, Christian. Destination London: German-speaking emigrés and British cinema, 1925-1950. Berghahn Books, 2008.
- Kreimeier, Klaus. The Ufa Story: A History of Germany's Greatest Film Company, 1918-1945.University of California Press, 1999.
