= Hearts Are Trumps (1920 German film) =

1920 film directed by Ewald André Dupont

- Directed by: Ewald André Dupont
- Written by: Felix Salten (short story); Max Jungk; Julius Urgiß
- Produced by: Hanns Lippmann
- Starring: Hermann Vallentin; Hans Mierendorff; Adele Sandrock
- Cinematography: Karl Hasselmann
- Production company: Gloria-Film
- Release date: 3 December 1920
- Country: Germany
- Languages: Silent; German intertitles

Hearts Are Trumps (German: Herztrumpf) is a 1920 German silent film directed by Ewald André Dupont and starring Hermann Vallentin, Hans Mierendorff and Adele Sandrock.

The film's sets were designed by the art director Robert A. Dietrich.

== Synopsis ==
In order to convince his idealistic son that true love does not exist, an industrialist hires a poor woman to convince him. However they fall in love and end up marrying.

== Cast ==
- Hermann Vallentin as Sebaldus Dühringer
- Hans Mierendorff as Dühringer jr.
- Adele Sandrock as Gelähmte Mutter
- Georg John as Dunkler mann
- Leonhard Haskel as Tinis Vater
- Marie Louise Jürgens as Tini Holm
- Hugo Döblin

== Bibliography ==
- Hans-Michael Bock and Tim Bergfelder. The Concise Cinegraph: An Encyclopedia of German Cinema. Berghahn Books, 2009.
