= Europe, General Delivery =

- Directed by: Ewald André Dupont
- Written by: Ewald André Dupont
- Starring: Max Landa; Viktor Senger; Lu Synd
- Cinematography: Max Fassbender
- Production company: Stern-Film
- Release date: 19 July 1918
- Country: Germany
- Languages: Silent; German intertitles

Europe, General Delivery or Europe poste restante (German: Europa postlagernd) is a 1918 German silent mystery film directed by Ewald André Dupont and starring Max Landa, Viktor Senger and Lu Synd. It was part of a series of films starring Joe Deebs, a fiction British detective modelled on Sherlock Holmes. It marked Dupont's directorial debut.

The film's sets were designed by the art director Ernst Stern. It was shot at the Babelsberg Studios in Berlin.

== Cast ==
- Max Landa as Detektiv Joe Deebs
- Viktor Senger as Addison Wilmott
- Lu Synd as Pussy, seine Frau
- Guido Herzfeld as Leon Devries, Kommissar der Kriminalpolizei
- Maria Andersen as Anita Ferres
- Leonhard Haskel as Jan Suiter, Küster
- Lillebil Ibsen as Alice van der Velde, seine Pflegetochter
- Helene Voß as Frau Smits, Zimmervermieterin
- Hugo Werner-Kahle as Gustav Masson, ihr Onkel
- Stefanie Hantzsch
- Ernst Lübbert
- Martin Lübbert

== Bibliography ==
- Bergfelder, Tim & Cargnelli, Christian. Destination London: German-speaking emigrés and British cinema, 1925-1950. Berghahn Books, 2008.
