= World by the Throat =

1920 film directed by E. A. Dupont

- German: Der Würger der Welt
- Directed by: E. A. Dupont
- Written by: E. A. Dupont; Guido Kreutzer
- Starring: Max Landa; Hanni Weisse; Ernst Rückert
- Cinematography: Charles Paulus
- Production company: Stern-Film
- Release date: 2 January 1920
- Country: Germany
- Languages: Silent; German intertitles

World by the Throat (German: Der Würger der Welt) is a 1920 German silent crime film directed by E. A. Dupont and starring Max Landa, Hanni Weisse and Ernst Rückert.

The film's sets were designed by the art director Robert A. Dietrich.

== Cast ==
- Max Landa as detective
- Hanni Weisse as Sonja
- Leo Connard as Professor Georg Melville
- Ernst Rückert as Mc Lean, his Assistant
- Rosa Liechtenstein as Eugenie, his daughter
- Arthur Bergen as Iwan Nedela, A Russian student
- Edmund Löwe as Boris Alschkin, a nihilist
- Leopold von Ledebur as Algernon Selkirk, the American sugar mogul
- Erich Waldow as Barnes, mate of the detective
