= What the Stones Tell =

1925 film

- Directed by: Rolf Randolf
- Written by: Carl Gustav von Negelein
- Produced by: Rolf Randolf; Carl Gustav von Negelein
- Starring: Ernst Rückert; Fritz Greiner; Eduard von Winterstein
- Cinematography: Ludwig Lippert
- Production company: Ranneg-Film
- Distributed by: Filmhaus Bruckmann
- Release date: 7 August 1925
- Country: Germany
- Languages: Silent; German intertitles

What the Stones Tell (German: Was Steine erzählen) is a 1925 German silent historical war film directed by Rolf Randolf and starring Ernst Rückert, Fritz Greiner and Eduard von Winterstein. The film portrays the Lützow Free Corps of the Napoleonic Era. Its title references a poem about the unit and is part of the tradition of Prussian films.

The film's sets were designed by the famous art director Robert A. Dietrich.

== Cast ==
- Ernst Rückert as Theodor Körner
- Fritz Greiner as Andreas Hofer
- Eduard von Winterstein as General Wrangel
- Rudolf Hilberg as Major von Lützow
- Elise Aulinger as Hoferin
- Karl Beckersachs as Lieutenant
- Christian Bummerstaedt as Friedrich Förster
- Theodor Loos
- Karl Platen
- Grete Reinwald

== Bibliography ==
- Bock, Hans-Michael & Bergfelder, Tim. The Concise CineGraph. Encyclopedia of German Cinema. Berghahn Books, 2009.
