= Two Worlds (1930 German film) =

1930 film directed by Ewald André Dupont

Zwei Welten
- Directed by: Ewald André Dupont
- Starring: Helene Sieburg; Hermann Vallentin
- Release date: 16 September 1930
- Running time: 119 min
- Country: Germany
- Language: German

Two Worlds (German: Zwei Welten) is the German version of an English-language film directed by Ewald André Dupont.

== Cast ==
- Helene Sieburg – Esther Goldschneider
- Hermann Vallentin – Uhrmacher Simon Goldschneider
- Friedrich Kayßler – Oberst von Kaminsky
- Peter Voß – Leutnant Stanislaus von Kaminsky
- Maria Paudler – Mizzi Staudinger
- Julius Brandt – Korporal
- Paul Graetz – Schumacher Mendel
- Anton Pointner – Hauptmann Ballentin
- Fritz Spira – Major
- Harry Terry – Plünderer
- Boris Ranevsky – Russischer Fähnrich
- Leo Monosson – Österreichischer Soldat
- Rudolf Meinhard-Jünger – Ordonanzsoldat
- Michael von Newlinsky – Ordonnanzoffizier
