= Two Worlds (1930 British film) =

1930 film directed by Ewald André Dupont

- Directed by: Ewald André Dupont
- Written by: Ewald André Dupont; Norbert Falk; Miles Malleson; Franz Schulz; Thekla von Bodo
- Produced by: Ewald André Dupont; Herman Millakowsky
- Starring: Norah Baring; John Longden; Donald Calthrop
- Cinematography: Mutz Greenbaum; Charles Rosher
- Edited by: Emile de Ruelle
- Music by: Otto Stransky
- Production companies: British International Pictures; Greenbaum-Film
- Distributed by: Wardour Films
- Release date: 28 July 1930
- Running time: 95 minutes
- Country: United Kingdom
- Language: English

Two Worlds is a 1930 British war drama film directed by Ewald André Dupont and starring Norah Baring, John Longden and Donald Calthrop. It was made at Elstree Studios by British International Pictures. It was made in multiple-language-versions, with a separate German-language version Zwei Welten and the French Les deux mondes.

The film's art direction was by Alfred Junge.

The film is set during the First World War. The action takes place on the Eastern Front between Austria and the Russian Empire.

== Cast ==
- Norah Baring as Esther Goldscheider
- John Longden as Lt. Stanislaus von Zaminsky
- Donald Calthrop as Mendel
- Randle Ayrton as Simon Goldscheider
- Constance Carpenter as Mizzi
- C. M. Hallard as Col. von Zaminsky
- Jack Trevor as Captain Stanislaus
- Andrews Engelmann as Lieutenant
- Gus Sharland as Major
- Boris Ranevsky as Ensign
- Georges Marakoff as Colonel
- John Harlow as Corporal

== Bibliography ==
- Wood, Linda. British Films, 1927-1939. British Film Institute, 1986.
