= The Face Removed =

1920 film directed by Franz Seitz

- Directed by: Franz Seitz
- Written by: Franz Seitz
- Starring: Carla Ferra; Ernst Rückert
- Cinematography: Karl Attenberger
- Production company: Union-Film München
- Release date: 13 June 1920
- Country: Germany
- Languages: Silent; German intertitles

The Face Removed (German: Das ausgeschnittene Gesicht) is a 1920 German silent crime film directed by Franz Seitz and starring Carla Ferra and Ernst Rückert.

The film's sets were designed by the art director August Rinaldi.

== Cast ==
- Carla Ferra as Estella
- Heinrich Peer as Detective Fogg
- Ernst Rückert
- Max Weydner as Harry Davis

== Bibliography ==
- Grange, William. Cultural Chronicle of the Weimar Republic. Scarecrow Press, 2008.
