= Viktor Senger =

German actor

- Born: 11 August 1870; Darmstadt, Hesse, German Empire
- Died: 25 June 1942 (aged 71); Berlin, Germany
- Occupation: Actor
- Years active: 1914–1934 (film)

Viktor Senger (1870 – 1942) was a German stage and film actor.

== Selected filmography ==
- Frank Hansen's Fortune (1917)
- Cain (1918)
- Europe, General Delivery (1918)
- Madame Récamier (1920)
- Johann Baptiste Lingg (1920)
- Dancer of Death (1920)
- Mignon (1922)
- Rudderless (1924)
- Women You Rarely Greet (1925)
- Bismarck (1925)
- Bismarck 1862–1898 (1927)
- The Marriage Nest (1927)
- The Old Fritz (1928)
- The Fate of Renate Langen (1931)
- The Last Waltz (1934)

== Bibliography ==
- Kester, Bernadette (2003). Film Front Weimar: Representations of the First World War in German films of the Weimar Period (1919–1933). Amsterdam: Amsterdam University Press. ISBN 978-90-5356-598-8.
