= Your Dearest Enemy =

1916 film

- Directed by: Fritz Bernhardt
- Written by: Helene Hörmann
- Starring: Reinhold Schünzel; Victor Janson
- Production company: Flora-Film
- Release date: December 1916
- Country: Germany
- Languages: Silent; German intertitles

Your Dearest Enemy (German Ihr liebster Feind) is a 1916 German silent film directed by Fritz Bernhardt and starring Reinhold Schünzel and Victor Janson.

== Cast ==
- Reinhold Schünzel
- Victor Janson
- Tatjana Irrah
- Magnus Stifter

== Bibliography ==
- Bock, Hans-Michael & Bergfelder, Tim. The Concise CineGraph. Encyclopedia of German Cinema. Berghahn Books, 2009.
