= Laugh Bajazzo =

- Directed by: Richard Oswald
- Written by: Richard Oswald
- Produced by: Paul Davidson; Jules Greenbaum
- Starring: Rudolph Schildkraut; Alfred Abel; Hanni Weisse
- Cinematography: Hermann Boettger
- Production company: Vitascope Film
- Distributed by: PAGU
- Release date: 7 January 1915
- Running time: 83 minutes
- Country: Germany
- Languages: Silent; German intertitles

Laugh Bajazzo (German: Lache Bajazzo) is a 1915 German silent drama film directed by Richard Oswald and starring Rudolph Schildkraut, Alfred Abel and Hanni Weisse.

It was shot at the Weissensee Studios in Berlin.

== Cast ==
- Rudolph Schildkraut as Musiker Rudolf
- Alfred Abel as Schriftsteller Alfred
- Ferdinand Bonn as HausmeisterßFaktotum
- Hanni Weisse as Hanni Rober - Kontoristin
- Johanna Terwin as Janni - Alfreds Frau
- Robert Valberg
- Hanne Brinkmann
- Felix Basch
- Wilhelm Diegelmann as Rentner Lehmann
- Hans Wassmann

== Bibliography ==
- Goble, Alan. The Complete Index to Literary Sources in Film. Walter de Gruyter, 1999.
- Thomas, Douglas B. The Early History of German Motion Pictures, 1895-1935. Thomas International, 1999.
