= The Cavalier from Wedding =

1927 film

- Directed by: Wolfgang Neff
- Written by: Bobby E. Lüthge
- Starring: Kurt Vespermann; Maly Delschaft; Hanni Weisse
- Cinematography: Leopold Kutzleb
- Production company: National Film
- Distributed by: National Film
- Release date: 25 February 1927
- Country: Germany
- Languages: Silent; German intertitles

The Cavalier from Wedding (German:Der Kavalier vom Wedding) is a 1927 German silent film directed by Wolfgang Neff and starring Kurt Vespermann, Maly Delschaft and Hanni Weisse.

The film's art direction was by Max Knaake.

== Cast ==
- Kurt Vespermann
- Maly Delschaft
- Hanni Weisse
- Carl Walther Meyer
- Hilde Maroff
- Hanne Brinkmann
- Renate Brausewetter
- Senta Eichstaedt
