= The Passenger in Compartment Seven =

1922 film

- Directed by: Willy Zeyn
- Written by: Hans von Wolzogen
- Starring: Max Landa; Hanni Weisse
- Production company: Max Landa-Film
- Release date: 1 September 1922
- Country: Germany
- Languages: Silent; German intertitles

The Passenger in Compartment Seven (German: Der Passagier von Nr. 7) is a 1922 German silent film directed by Willy Zeyn and starring Max Landa and Hanni Weisse.

== Cast ==
- Max Landa
- Hanni Weisse
- Karl Platen
- Max Grünberg

== Bibliography ==
- Grange, William. Cultural Chronicle of the Weimar Republic. Scarecrow Press, 2008.
