= The Blood (film) =

1922 film

- Directed by: Paul Legband
- Written by: Tilla Durieux; Artur Landsberger
- Produced by: Artur Landsberger
- Cinematography: Curt Courant
- Production company: Artur Landsberger-Film
- Release date: 2 February 1922
- Country: Germany
- Languages: Silent; German intertitles

The Blood (German: Das Blut) is a 1922 German silent film directed by Paul Legband.

== Cast ==
- Albert Steinrück
- Hanni Weisse
- Guido Herzfeld as Pieter Last
- Victor Varconi as Dr. Robert Kargert, Advokat
- Sophie Pagay as Susanne, die Amme
- Dora Bergner as Frau von Joergens
- Frida Brock as Brigitte, die Kellnerin

== Bibliography ==
- Bock, Hans-Michael; Bergfelder, Tim, eds. (2009). The Concise Cinegraph: Encyclopaedia of German Cinema. New York: Berghahn Books. ISBN 978-1-57181-655-9.
