= Midnight (1918 film) =

1918 film directed by Ewald André Dupont

- Directed by: Ewald André Dupont
- Written by: Ewald André Dupont
- Starring: Max Landa; Karl Beckersachs; Reinhold Schünzel
- Cinematography: Max Fassbender
- Production company: Stern-Film
- Release date: 30 August 1918
- Country: Germany
- Languages: Silent; German intertitles

Midnight (German: Mitternacht) is a 1918 German silent crime film directed by Ewald André Dupont and starring Max Landa, Karl Beckersachs and Reinhold Schünzel.

== Cast ==
- Max Landa as Max, Detective
- Karl Beckersachs as Donald Gordon (Kapitän)
- Heinrich Peer as Dorian Morny (Graf)
- Erich Rahn as Jiu-Jitsu-Meister
- Reinhold Schünzel as Dick Tillinghaft (Reporter)
- Adolf Paul as Alex Smirnow (Graf)
- Wilhelm Diegelmann as Jimmy
- Leopold von Ledebur as Präsident der Republik
- Margarete Ferida as Helene Trevor (Frau)
- Anneliese Halbe as Beatrice Trevor (Stieftochter)
- Martin Lübbert as Alfred Clark (Trevors Sekretär
- Maria Pospischil as Frau MacAllister
- Eberhard Wrede as Kriminalkommissar
- Hugo Werner-Kahle as Edmund Trevor
- Olga Wojan

== Bibliography ==
- Bock, Hans-Michael & Bergfelder, Tim. The Concise CineGraph. Encyclopedia of German Cinema. Berghahn Books, 2009.
