= The Standard-Bearer of Sedan =

1927 film

- Directed by: Johannes Brandt
- Written by: Johannes Brandt; Iva Raffay
- Starring: Walter Slezak; Camilla von Hollay; Vera Schmiterlöw
- Cinematography: Paul Holzki
- Production company: Internationale Film AG
- Release date: 11 November 1927
- Country: Germany
- Languages: Silent; German intertitles

The Standard-Bearer of Sedan (German: Der Fahnenträger von Sedan) is a 1927 German silent historical film directed by Johannes Brandt and starring Walter Slezak, Camilla von Hollay and Vera Schmiterlöw. The film's sets were designed by the art director Robert A. Dietrich.

== Cast ==
- Walter Slezak
- Camilla von Hollay
- Vera Schmiterlöw
- Gaston Briese
- Carl Geppert
- Martin Kosleck
- Anton Pointner
- Ernst Rückert
- Otz Tollen
- Gustav Trautschold
- Kurt Vespermann

== Bibliography ==
- Lamprecht, Gerhard . Deutsche Stummfilme: 9a . 1927-1931. Deutsche Kinemathek, 1968.
- Quinlan, David. The Illustrated Directory of Film Stars. Hippocrene Books, 1981.
