= Mary Magdalene (1920 film) =

1920 film directed by Reinhold Schünzel

- Directed by: Reinhold Schünzel
- Written by: Friedrich Hebbel (play); Bobby E. Lüthge
- Produced by: Arzén von Cserépy
- Starring: Eduard von Winterstein; Ilka Grüning; Lucie Höflich
- Cinematography: Max Lutze
- Production company: Cserépy-Film
- Release date: 12 February 1920
- Country: Germany
- Languages: Silent; German intertitles

Mary Magdalene (German: Maria Magdalene) is a 1920 German silent drama film directed by Reinhold Schünzel and starring Eduard von Winterstein, Ilka Grüning and Lucie Höflich.

The film's sets were designed by the art director Hans Dreier.

== Cast ==
- Eduard von Winterstein as Meister Anton
- Ilka Grüning as Ehefrau von Meister Anton
- Lucie Höflich as Klara
- Paul Hartmann as Karl
- Reinhold Schünzel as Leonhard
- Eugen Klöpfer as Sekretär
- Jenny Marba as Ehefrau vom Sekretär
- Wilhelm Diegelmann as Bürgermeister
- Fritz Beckmann as Adam
- Gustav Botz as Arzt
- Harry Berber as Kandidat
- Paul Graetz as Der alte Schneider
- Martha Dibbern as Ehefrau des alte Schneider
- Hans Behrendt as Totengräber
- Karl Platen
- Irene Katsch

== Bibliography ==
- Bock, Hans-Michael & Bergfelder, Tim. The Concise CineGraph. Encyclopedia of German Cinema. Berghahn Books, 2009.
