= Christian Wahnschaffe =

1920 film directed by Urban Gad

- Directed by: Urban Gad
- Written by: Jakob Wassermann (novel); Paul Georg; Bobby E. Lüthge; Hans Behrendt
- Starring: Conrad Veidt; Fritz Kortner; Werner Krauss
- Cinematography: Max Lutze (Part I); Willy Hameister (Part II)
- Music by: Giuseppe Becce (Part I); Alexander Schirmann (Part II)
- Production company: Terra Film
- Distributed by: Terra Film
- Release dates: 12 November 1920 (Part I); 30 March 1921 (Part II)
- Running time: 77 minutes (Part I); 75 minutes (Part II)
- Country: Germany
- Languages: Silent; German intertitles

Christian Wahnschaffe is a 1920 German silent drama film directed by Urban Gad and starring Conrad Veidt, Lillebil Ibsen, Hermann Vallentin and Fritz Kortner. It was released in two parts: World Ablaze (Weltbrand) in November 1920 and The Escape from the Golden Prison (Die Flucht aus dem goldenen Kerker) in March 1921. It is an adaptation of the novel of the same title by Jakob Wassermann. The film is extant, and was restored in 2018 by the Friedrich-Wilhelm-Murnau-Stiftung.

The film's sets were designed by the art director Robert A. Dietrich.

== Cast ==
=== Part 1: World Ablaze ===
- Conrad Veidt as Christian Wahnschaffe
- Lillebil Ibsen as Eva Sorel
- Hermann Vallentin as Cardillac
- Hugo Flink
- Fritz Kortner as Iwan Becker
- Ernst Matray
- Theodor Loos as Amadeus Voß
- Helga Molander as Laetitia
- Leopold von Ledebur as Großfürst
- Frida Richard as Arbeiterfrau
- Franz Sutton as Arbeiter Kroll
- Josef Peterhans as Geheimagent des Großfürsten
- Paula Barra
- Fritz Feld
- Sadjah Gezza
- Paul Graetz
- Ilka Grüning
- Esther Hagan
- Leopoldine Konstantin
- Maria Reisenhofer
- Margarete Schlegel
- Reinhold Schünzel
- Sylvia Torf
- Rosa Valetti
- Aruth Wartan

=== Part 2: The Escape from the Golden Prison ===
- Conrad Veidt as Christian Wahnschaffe
- Magda Madeleine as Wahnschaffes Geliebte
- Werner Krauss as Niels Heinrich
- Ernst Pröckl as Amadeus Voß
- Esther Hagan as Dirne Karen Engelschall
- Margarete Kupfer as Mutter Engelschall
- Rose Müller as Ruth Hofmann
- Fritz Feld as Idiot
- Ernst Dernburg
- Ilka Grüning
- Emil Heyse
- Lillebil Ibsen
- Jenny Marba
- Hella Moja
- Reinhold Schünzel

== Bibliography ==
- Grange, William (2008). Cultural Chronicle of the Weimar Republic. Lanham, MD: Scarecrow Press. ISBN 978-0-8108-5967-8.
- Soister, John T. (2002). Conrad Veidt on Screen: A Comprehensive Illustrated Filmography. Jefferson, NC: McFarland. ISBN 978-0-7864-1289-1.
