= The Grand Duke's Finances =

1924 film

- Film poster
- Directed by: F. W. Murnau
- Written by: Frank Heller; Thea von Harbou; Fritz Wendhausen
- Produced by: Erich Pommer
- Starring: Harry Liedtke; Mady Christians
- Cinematography: Karl Freund; Franz Planer
- Production company: UFA
- Distributed by: UFA
- Release date: 7 January 1924
- Running time: 80 minutes
- Country: Weimar Republic
- Languages: Silent; German intertitles

The Grand Duke's Finances (German: Die Finanzen des Großherzogs) is a 1924 silent German comedy film directed by F. W. Murnau.

== Plot ==
The Grand Duke's Finances (1924)

The Grand Duke of Abacco is the benevolent ruler of a small and heavily indebted Mediterranean island. The Grand Duke is trying to avoid the usurious money lender, Markowitz, who demands debt repayment. One hope to improve the situation would be a marriage to the wealthy Russian Grand Duchess Olga, who sends the Grand Duke a letter saying she is determined to marry him despite not knowing him, and against the opposition of her brother, the Crown Prince of Russia.

Businessman Mr. Bekker offers a substantial sum of money to exploit a sulphur mine but the Grand Duke is worried it would have negative effects on his subjects. Bekker joins with local conspirators to organize a revolution against the Grand Duke. In addition, the letter from Grand Duchess Olga is fraudulently obtained by Marcowitz.

Thief-detective Phillip Collin, passing as Professor Pelotard, tries to retrieve from Markowitz incriminating letters written by Congressman Isaak. In the process, he also finds the letter from Grand Duchess Olga and replaces it with a copy. Collin asks Isaak for a 50,000 pound loan as his fee, and tells him that he will use it to speculate on Abacco's debt. The Grand Duke decides to go secretly to the continent to retrieve Olga's letter.

Meanwhile, Phillip Collin meets an unknown woman in a café, who asks him to help her hide from her pursuers. He willingly obliges, and later finds out that she is Grand Duchess Olga and that her pursuer is her brother.

The newspapers report on the speculation on Abacco's bonds, on the outbreak of a revolution in Abacco and on the disappearance of the Grand Duke. All regular voyages to Abacco are interrupted but Olga, who now passes as Collins's wife, charters a ship to take her to the island. She agrees to take along the Grand Duke, whom she has not recognised, and who introduced himself as a supporter of the Grand Duke. Marcowitz boards the Russian Crown Prince's warship and convinces him to go to Abacco by showing him his sister's (fake) letter.

On Abacco, after a brief skirmish, the Grand Duke and Collin overcome the self-proclaimed president of the island republic and his accomplices. However further revolutionaries overpower the Grand Duke and start preparing for his hanging. Olga now understands who the Grand Duke truly is, and wants save him by paying off the revolutionaries, but her plan fails.

At that moment, the Russian Crown Prince takes control of the situation with his navy. Unfortunately, the Crown Prince is inclined to have the Grand Duke hanged, for having sold his sister's letter. However Olga dismisses the letter as a clumsy forgery. Collin gives the authentic letter to the Grand Duke which allows him to refute the accusation. The Crown Prince orders an immediate marriage and Collin celebrates the success of his speculation on Abacco's debt.

== Cast ==
In alphabetical order

- Alfred Abel as Philipp Collins aka Professor Pelotard
- Hugo Block as Joaquino, the valet
- Mady Christians as Grand Duchess Olga of Russia
- Adolphe Engers as Don Esteban Paqueno
- Julius Falkenstein as Ernst Isaaks
- Ilka Grüning as Augustina, the personal chef
- Guido Herzfeld as Semjon Markowitz, the usurer
- Georg August Koch as the dangerous conspirator
- Harry Liedtke as Don Roman XX, Grand Duke of Abacco
- Walter Rilla as Luis Hernandez, the ambitious conspirator
- Hans Hermann Schaufuss as the hunchbacked conspirator
- Robert Scholtz as the Crown Prince of Russia, the brother of the Grand Duchess
- Max Schreck as the sinister conspirator
- Hermann Vallentin as Mr. Bekker
- Balthasar von Campenhausen as Adjutant

== Production and release ==
The film is based on the novel of the same name by Swedish author Frank Heller, and adapted for film by Thea von Harbou. It was shot from May to August 1923 at UFA's Tempelhof Studios in Berlin, on the sets built by Rochus Gliese and Erich Czerwonski. The on-location scenes were shot on the Adriatic coast in Split, Kotor, Zadar and Rab. The film premièred in Berlin on 7 January 1924 at the Ufa-Palast am Zoo. It is the only comedy directed by F. W. Murnau.
