= The Rose of the Flyer =

- Directed by: Kurt Rothe
- Starring: Reinhold Schünzel
- Production company: Rothe-Film
- Release date: 1919
- Country: Germany
- Languages: Silent; German intertitles

The Rose of the Flyer (German: Die Rose des Fliegers) is a 1919 German silent film directed by Kurt Rothe and starring Reinhold Schünzel.

== Cast ==
- Will Korten-Kreswich
- Reinhold Schünzel
- Heinz Treskow
- Ortrud Wagner

== Bibliography ==
- Bock, Hans-Michael & Bergfelder, Tim. The Concise CineGraph. Encyclopedia of German Cinema. Berghahn Books, 2009.
