= Hanni Weisse =

German actress

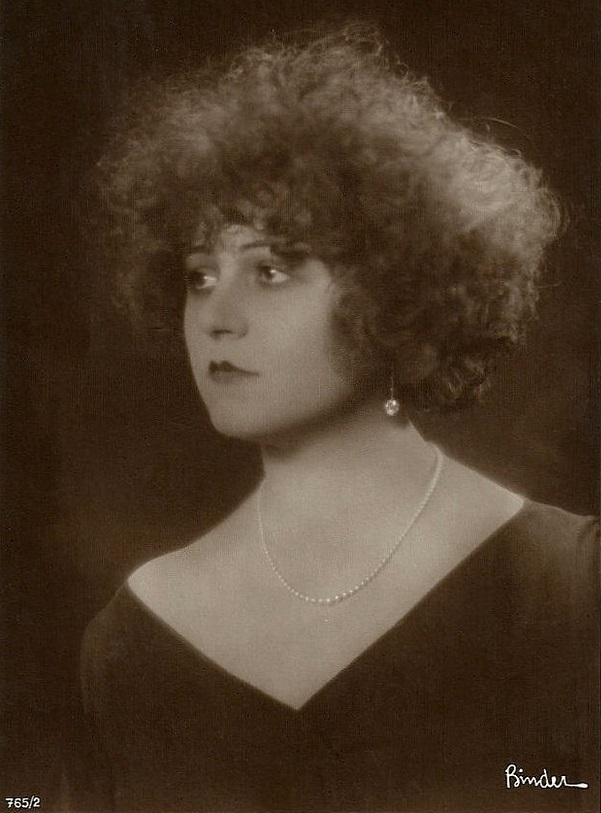
- Born: Johanna Clara Theresia Weisse; 16 October 1892; Chemnitz, Saxony, German Empire
- Died: 13 December 1967 (aged 75); Bad Liebenzell, Baden-Württemberg, West Germany
- Occupation: Actor
- Years active: 1912–1942 (film)
- Spouse: Bobby E. Lüthge (divorced)

Hanni Weisse (16 October 1892 – 13 December 1967) was a German stage and film actress. She appeared in 146 films between 1912 and 1942.

== Biography ==
Hanni Weisse was born on 16 October 1892 in Chemnitz. In 1910, she received an apprenticeship in cello playing and first appeared in small roles with choral engagement at the Berlin Thalia Theater in 1910. In 1912, Weisse became a member of the Royal Belvedere Dresden, with whom she toured all of Germany.

The film director Max Mack discovered her that same year, and Weisse signed a contract with the Vitascope film company. She made her film debut in the short Whims of Fate (1912) with Erwin Fichtner and Lotte Neumann. Weisse's most popular film role was that of an alcoholic mother in E.A. Dupont's Alcohol (1919). In 1922, she starred alongside Albert Steinrück in The Blood. Weisse's first husband, Bobby E. Lüthge, wrote the screenplays for Mater dolorosa (1924), The Cavalier from Wedding (1927), and Kaczmarek (1928), all of which Weisse starred in.

In the 1930s, Weisse returned to the theater, performing at the Theater am Schiffbauerdamm and the Lessingtheater. Weisse made her final screen appearance in Vom Schicksal verweht (1942).

After retiring from the film industry, Weisse and her second husband opened a hotel-restaurant called Herrenhaus near Ústí nad Labem. In 1948, Weisse moved to West Germany and opened a pub in Frankfurt. She was also the owner of the hotel-restaurant Zum Heidelberger.

Hanni Weisse died on 13 December 1967.

== Selected filmography ==
- The Other (1913)
- Ivan Koschula (1914)
- The Iron Cross (1914)
- The Hound of the Baskervilles (1914)
- Ein Seltsamer Fall (1914) German adaptation of Dr. Jekyll and Mr. Hyde
- Laugh Bajazzo (1915)
- Alkohol (1919)
- The Apache of Marseilles (1919)
- The Spies (1919)
- Anita Jo (1919)
- The Derby (1919)
- Between Two Worlds (1919)
- The Grand Babylon Hotel (1920)
- The Count of Cagliostro (1920)
- World by the Throat (1920)
- The Chameleon (1920)
- Alfred von Ingelheim's Dramatic Life (1921)
- Night and No Morning (1921)
- The Experiment of Professor Mithrany (1921)
- The Island of the Lost (1921)
- Murder Without Cause (1921)
- The Oath of Stephan Huller (1921)
- The Graveyard of the Living (1921)
- Symphony of Death (1921)
- The Blood (1922)
- The Passenger in Compartment Seven (1922)
- The False Dimitri (1922)
- The Game with Women (1922)
- Nanon (1924)
- The Evangelist (1924)
- Three Waiting Maids (1925)
- The Elegant Bunch (1925)
- The Man Without Sleep (1926)
- The Mill at Sanssouci (1926)
- Sword and Shield (1926)
- When the Young Wine Blossoms (1927)
- Girls, Beware! (1928)
- Under Suspicion (1928)
- Darling of the Dragoons (1928)
- Marriage Strike (1930)
- His Late Excellency (1935)
- Trouble Backstairs (1935)
- The Saint and Her Fool (1935)
- Thunder, Lightning and Sunshine (1936)
- Diamonds (1937)
- The Chief Witness (1937)
- Sergeant Berry (1938)
