= Der Graf von Cagliostro =

1920 silent film

- Directed by: Reinhold Schünzel
- Screenplay by: Robert Liebmann; Reinhold Schünzel
- Produced by: Victor Micheluzzi; Reinhold Schünzel
- Starring: Reinhold Schünzel; Anita Berber; Conrad Veidt; Carl Goetz
- Cinematography: Kurt Lande; Carl Hoffmann
- Production companies: Lichtbild-Fabrikation Schünzel-Film; Vereinigte Filmindustrie Micheluzzi & Co
- Release dates: 21 December 1920 (Vienna); 17 February 1921 (Berlin)
- Countries: Austria; Germany

Der Graf von Cagliostro (German for "The Count of Cagliostro") is a 1920 silent film directed and co-written by Reinhold Schünzel and starring Schünzel, Anita Berber and Conrad Veidt. It depicts the life of the eighteenth century Italian mesmerist and occultist Alessandro Cagliostro, who called himself Cagliostro. The film is considered a lost film.

== Cast ==
- Reinhold Schünzel as Cagliostro
- Anita Berber as Lorenza, Cagliostro's slave
- Conrad Veidt as the Minister
- Carl Goetz as the Prince
- Hugo Werner-Kahle as Cagliostro's servant
- Hanni Weisse as the Favorite of the Prince
- Hilde Wörner as the Maid of the Favorite
- Walter Huber
- Heinrich Jensen
- Armin Seydelmann
- Ferry Sikla

== Release and reception ==
Der Graf von Cagliostro has its world premiere on 21 December 1920 at Busch-Kino, Vienna. It was later shown in Germany on 17 February 1921 at the Marmorhaus in Berlin.

Der Kinematograph declared the film as "marvelously effective cinema" while the script is "the weakest element in the entire production." The review also praised Carl Goetz who "gives the best performance of all" and Conrad Veidt as "very effective in his opulent costumes". A review in Film-Kurier stated that the film "could have been a masterpiece", blaming Robert Liebmann's script which "didn't expend any extra energy and what he did manage doesn't come close to the demands of this subject." The review echoed Der Kinematograph's review stating "Carl Goetz and Conrad Veidt are the only actors whose every gesture is perfect."
