= Cain (1918 film) =

1918 film

- Directed by: Bruno Rahn; Walter Schmidthässler
- Written by: Robert Heymann
- Produced by: Max Maschke
- Starring: Erich Kaiser-Titz; Olga Engl; Reinhold Schünzel
- Cinematography: Ernest Plhak
- Production company: Luna-Film
- Distributed by: Luna-Film
- Release date: 4 August 1918
- Country: Germany
- Languages: Silent; German intertitles

Cain (German: Kain) is a 1918 German silent drama film directed by Bruno Rahn and Walter Schmidthässler and produced by Max Maschke. In the starring roles were Erich Kaiser-Titz, Olga Engl and Reinhold Schünzel. It was released in two separate parts Das Verhängnis auf Schloß Santarem and Im Goldrausch.

== Cast ==
- August Dewald
- Olga Engl
- Karl Falkenberg
- Olga Fuchs
- Erich Kaiser-Titz
- Marija Leiko
- Olga Limburg
- Arthur Schröder
- Reinhold Schünzel
- Viktor Senger
- Johanna Terwin

== Bibliography ==
- Bock, Hans-Michael; Bergfelder, Tim, eds. (2009). The Concise Cinegraph: Encyclopaedia of German Cinema. New York: Berghahn Books. ISBN 978-1-57181-655-9.
