= The Bandits of Asnières =

1920 film

- Directed by: Karl Mueller-Hagens
- Written by: Carlo Emerich
- Starring: Max Landa; Reinhold Schünzel; Hilde Wörner
- Cinematography: Kurt Lande
- Production company: Wörner-Filmgesellschaft
- Release date: 17 July 1920
- Country: Germany
- Languages: Silent; German intertitles

The Bandits of Asnières (Germany: Die Banditen von Asnières) is a 1920 German silent crime film directed by Karl Mueller-Hagens and starring Max Landa, Reinhold Schünzel and Hilde Wörner.

== Cast ==
- Max Landa as Der Detektiv
- Reinhold Schünzel as Jean, der Apache
- Hilde Wörner as die Frau

== Bibliography ==
- Schöning, Jörg (1989). Reinhold Schünzel: Schauspieler und Regisseur (in German). Munich: Text + Kritik. ISBN 978-3-88377-351-3.
