= The Grand Babylon Hotel (1920 film) =

1920 film directed by E.A. Dupont

- Hans Albers (right)
- Directed by: E.A. Dupont
- Written by: Hanns Kräly
- Starring: Hans Albers; Max Landa; Karl Falkenberg
- Cinematography: Charles Paulus
- Production company: Stern-Film
- Release date: 6 February 1920
- Country: Germany
- Languages: Silent; German intertitles

The Grand Babylon Hotel (German: Das Grand Hotel Babylon) is a 1920 German silent mystery film directed by E.A. Dupont and starring Hans Albers, Max Landa and Karl Falkenberg. The film's title is drawn from the 1902 novel The Grand Babylon Hotel by Arnold Bennett.

== Cast ==
- Hans Albers
- Max Landa
- Karl Falkenberg
- Toni Grünfeld
- Hanni Weisse
- Maria Zelenka

== Bibliography ==
- Hunter, Jefferson. English Filing, English Writing. Indiana University Press. 2010.
