= The Ancient Law =

1923 film directed by E. A. Dupont

- German: Das alte Gesetz
- Directed by: E. A. Dupont
- Written by: Heinrich Laube; Paul Reno
- Starring: Henny Porten; Ruth Weyher; Hermann Vallentin; Avrom Morewski
- Cinematography: Theodor Sparkuhl
- Production company: Comedia-Film
- Release date: 29 October 1923
- Running time: 128 minutes
- Country: Germany
- Languages: Silent; German intertitles

The Ancient Law (German: Das alte Gesetz) is a 1923 German silent drama film directed by E. A. Dupont and starring Henny Porten, Ruth Weyher and Hermann Vallentin. The son of an Orthodox Rabbi faces hostility from his father when he decides to become an actor.

== Plot ==
The Ancient Law (1923)

The film takes place in the 1860s, and opens on the celebration of Purim in a Galician shtetl. Baruch, the rabbi’s son, takes the role of king Ahasuerus in the Purim spiel. His father, walking in on the festivities, is angered by his son taking part in the play. Reuben Pick, a traveler, counters the rabbi, stating that outside of the ghetto actors are respected and honored. Baruch is intrigued by this statement, and asks if Jews can be actors as well. Reuben pick confirms this, and then the rabbi banishes Baruch to the other room. Now drawn to outside world, Baruch declares his intent to become an actor, and, once his father realizes he isn’t joking, is forbidden to leave the house. He sneaks out during the night, and finds a traveling theatre troop.

He joins the troupe, and performs as Romeo in Romeo and Juliet for a royal Austrian picnic, where the Austrian Archduchess Elisabeth Theresia takes a liking to him. During the final scene of the play, Baruch removes his hat, revealing his curled payot. The crowd fills with laughter at the thought of a Jewish Romeo. The theater director is angered at him for ruining the dramatic scene, and kicks him out. The archduchess invites Baruch to talk with her after the performance. Upon hearing how he was kicked out of the acting troupe, she arranges him an engagement at the Burgtheater in Vienna.

After being accepting into the theater, Baruch meets with the archduchess again, stating that the only thing he still desires is to play Hamlet in the upcoming play. The archduchess is saddened by his seeming lack of romantic interest in her, but lets him go. She then conspires to get the Hamlet’s current actor kicked out of the play, securing Baruch the role. The opening of the play takes place on Yom Kippur, causing Baruch internal conflict, over giving up his acting dreams, or following his religion. He frantically prays in the dressing room before his performance. The play ends up being a success, and he is invited to a ball by the archduchess.

At the ball, he meets the archduchess in a secluded park, and they talk. She invites him to visit her tomorrow, and they both leave, the archduchess forgetting her fan on the ground. Before her and Baruch’s meeting, the archduchess is approached by an official. He confronts her with her lost fan, and demands her to stop spending time with actors alone. Now distraught, the archduchess meets with Baruch, and admits they cannot see each other again. She laments at the higher rules holding them apart, the ancient law, and the law of etiquette.

Now a successful actor, we see Baruch in a rich house, preparing for his future role in Don Carlos. A servant arrives to tell him a beggar is at the door, and Reuben Pick enters. Baruch greets him warmly, and asks how things are in his home village. Reuben speaks of his mother in a deep depression because of his absence, and of his friend Esther, waiting for him to return someday. Baruch tentatively asks Reuben if he thinks he’d ever be welcomed back by the community. Baruch then returns to his family during the Passover prayers, hoping to be accepted, and his father disowns him. He leaves, but it embraced by Esther. They leave back to Vienna together.

Reuben Pick confronts the Rabbi, telling him he should learn of that which he condemns, and offers him a book of Shakespeare. The rabbi rejects the book, but then falls ill. Seeing this as a sign that he has wronged, the rabbi reads the Shakespeare book, and agrees to go with Reuben to Vienna to see his sons performance. Moved by his son’s performance, the rabbi shouts out for his son, and, in the final scene, accepts him and his passion for acting.

== Cast ==
- Henny Porten as Archduchess Elisabeth Theresia
- Ruth Weyher as court lady
- Hermann Vallentin as Heinrich Laube
- Avrom Morewski (Abraham Morewski) as Rabbi Mayer
- Ernst Deutsch as Baruch, his son
- Grete Berger as his mother
- Robert Garrison as Ruben Pick
- Margarete Schlegel as Esther, his daughter
- Jakob Tiedtke as Director of the Actors
- Olga Limburg as his wife
- Alice Hechy as second daughter
- Julius Brandt as an old comedian
- Fritz Richard as Nathan the professor
- Wolfgang Zilzer as page
- Kálmán Zátony as Joseph Wagner
- Robert Scholz
- Alfred Krafft-Lortzing
- Dominik Löscher
- Philipp Manning

== Production and release ==
The film sets were designed by Alfred Junge and realised by Curt Kahle. The costumes were designed by Ali Hubert.

The film premiered in Germany on 29 October 1923. It is seven acts long and was released for young people. It has been preserved in several copies, which differ from one another and in some cases do not correspond to the original. On the initiative of film scholar Cynthia Walk, the film was digitally restored by the Deutsche Kinemathek. Philippe Schoeller composed a new film score, which was recorded by the Jakobsplatz Orchestra in Munich. The restored version - with a longer running time of 135 minutes - premiered on 16 February 2018 at the Berlinale 2018 with a live performance of the film music in the Friedrichstadt-Palast. The intertitles and scene orders were reconstructed based on the censorship cards.

== Reception ==
Extensive reviews appeared in the film magazines Film-Kurier and Lichtbild-Bühne in 1923.

"Dupont succeeds in making the atmosphere of the very different worlds of this film visible: the ghetto milieu, which is separated from the world outside by an almost insurmountable wall, and this world itself; which is made vivid here by the Vienna of the sixties, which is carried by the rhythms of the waltzes of Johann Strauss and for which the Burgtheater is the epitome of all art par excellence."

"And now Dupont's direction: certainly, he made mistakes with lengths and widths. But how forgivable they are! Must one not involuntarily remain lovingly attached to the depiction of this milieu, which is necessary to awaken deeper understanding? These shortcomings can be eliminated with a few silhouettes. And how are they compensated for by enchanting directorial units, wonderfully seen images and a subtlety of line that may not always have been easy given the sacredness of the subject."
