= The Anti-Detective =

1920 film

- Directed by: Harry Berber
- Written by: Hans Behrendt; Harry Berber
- Starring: Reinhold Schünzel
- Cinematography: Eugen Hamm
- Production company: Emil Haeseki-Film
- Distributed by: Emil Haeseki-Film
- Release date: 1920
- Country: Germany
- Languages: Silent; German intertitles

The Anti-Detective (German: Der Anti-Detektiv) is a 1920 German silent film directed by Harry Berber and starring Reinhold Schünzel.

== Cast ==
In alphabetical order

- Maria Grimm-Einödshofer
- Charlotte Gühne
- Erner Huebsch
- Reinhold Schünzel
- Richard Senius

== Bibliography ==
- Bock, Hans-Michael; Bergfelder, Tim, eds. (2009). The Concise Cinegraph: Encyclopaedia of German Cinema. New York: Berghahn Books. ISBN 978-1-57181-655-9.
