= Moriturus (film) =

1920 film

- Directed by: Carl Hagen
- Written by: Ferdinand Runkel (novel)
- Produced by: Hilde Wörner
- Starring: Max Landa; Reinhold Schünzel; Conrad Veidt
- Cinematography: Kurt Lande
- Production company: Hilde Wörner Film Fabrikation
- Release date: 23 September 1920
- Country: Germany
- Languages: Silent; German intertitles

Moriturus is a 1920 German silent crime film directed by Carl Hagen and starring Max Landa, Reinhold Schünzel and Conrad Veidt. It premiered at the Marmorhaus in Berlin.

The film's sets were designed by the art director Mathieu Oostermann.

== Cast ==
- Max Landa as Detective Landa
- Reinhold Schünzel as Gutsherr
- Conrad Veidt as Wilmos
- Hilde Wörner as Siegnis
- Marga von Kierska as Miss Von Riberac
- Hans Tillo as Von Libenau

== Bibliography ==
- Soister, John T. (2002). Conrad Veidt on Screen: A Comprehensive Illustrated Filmography. Jefferson, NC: McFarland. ISBN 978-0-7864-1289-1.
