= One or the Other =

1919 film

- Directed by: Fritz Bernhardt
- Written by: Leonhard Haskel
- Starring: Reinhold Schünzel; Victor Janson
- Production company: Flora-Film
- Release date: May 1919
- Country: Germany
- Languages: Silent; German intertitles

One or the Other (German: Der oder der?) is a 1919 German silent film directed by Fritz Bernhardt and starring Victor Janson and Reinhold Schünzel. Originally made in 1916, it was not released until three years later.

== Cast ==
- Victor Janson
- Siegfried Berisch
- Leonhard Haskel
- Tatjana Irrah
- Reinhold Schünzel
- Alfred Kühne

== Bibliography ==
- Bock, Hans-Michael & Bergfelder, Tim. The Concise CineGraph. Encyclopedia of German Cinema. Berghahn Books, 2009.
