= Tabitha, Stand Up =

1922 film directed by Robert Dinesen

- Directed by: Robert Dinesen
- Written by: Margarete Böhme (novel); Adolf Lantz
- Produced by: Paul Davidson
- Starring: Lotte Neumann; Maria Forescu; Guido Herzfeld
- Cinematography: Carl Drews
- Production company: PAGU
- Distributed by: UFA
- Release date: 22 December 1922
- Country: Germany
- Languages: Silent; German intertitles

Tabitha, Stand Up or Tabitha, Arise! (German: Tabea, stehe auf!) is a 1922 German silent drama film directed by Robert Dinesen and starring Lotte Neumann, Maria Forescu and Guido Herzfeld.

The film's sets were designed by the art director Jack Winter.

== Cast ==
- Lotte Neumann
- Maria Forescu
- Guido Herzfeld
- Peter Ihle
- Theo Lucas
- Loni Nest
- Peter Nielsen
- Paul Otto
- Karl Platen
- Dora Schlüter
- Julia Serda
- Walter von Allwoerden
- Hans Heinrich von Twardowski
- Hugo Werner-Kahle

== Bibliography ==
- Grange, William. Cultural Chronicle of the Weimar Republic. Scarecrow Press, 2008.
