= The Chameleon (1920 film) =

1920 film

- German: Das Chamäleon
- Directed by: Carl Hagen
- Written by: Paul Rosenhayn
- Starring: Max Landa; Reinhold Schünzel; Hanni Weisse
- Cinematography: Kurt Lande
- Production company: Hilde Wörner Film Fabrikation
- Release date: 4 November 1920
- Country: Germany
- Languages: Silent; German intertitles

The Chameleon (German: Das Chamäleon) is a 1920 silent comedy film directed by Carl Hagen and starring Max Landa, Reinhold Schünzel, and Hanni Weisse. It was shot in Vienna.

== Cast ==
- Max Landa
- Reinhold Schünzel
- Hanni Weisse
- Hilde Wörner
