= The Experiment of Professor Mithrany =

1921 film directed by Dimitri Buchowetzki

- Directed by: Dimitri Buchowetzki
- Written by: Dimitri Buchowetzki; Walter Hell
- Starring: Max Landa; Hanni Weisse; Margit Barnay
- Cinematography: Arpad Viragh
- Production company: Wörner-Filmgesellschaft
- Release date: 26 May 1921
- Country: Germany
- Languages: Silent; German intertitles

The Experiment of Professor Mithrany (German: Das Experiment des Prof. Mithrany) is a 1921 German silent film directed by Dimitri Buchowetzki and starring Max Landa, Hanni Weisse and Margit Barnay. It premiered at the Marmorhaus in Berlin.

The film's sets were designed by the art director Mathieu Oostermann.

== Cast ==
- Max Landa
- Hanni Weisse
- Margit Barnay
- Robert Scholz

== Bibliography ==
- Alfred Krautz. International directory of cinematographers, set- and costume designers in film, Volume 4. Saur, 1984.
