= Tatjana Irrah =

German silent film actress

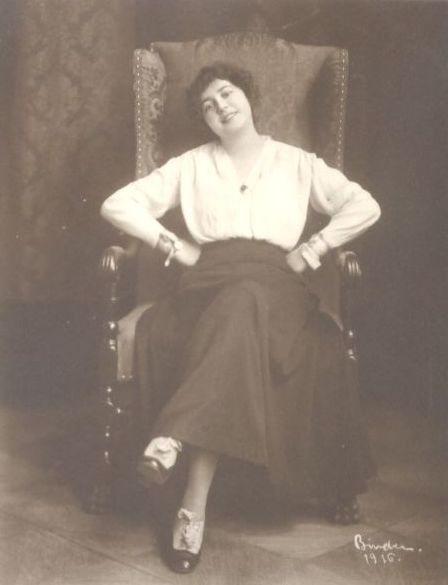

Tatjana Irrah (born Olga Bernhardt, 15 May 1892 – 13 January 1949), also known as Tatjana Irah and Tatjana Yrrah, was a German film and stage actress who appeared in German and American silent films. Her film career began in Germany in 1913. Around 1916, she moved to the United States due to the film shortage in her home country.

Her performance in Die Grosstadtluft was reviewed as "the one characterization in the play that was done exceptionally well". She played a main role in the comedy film Der oder Der (One or the Other).

In 1920 her first American film was released.

== Filmography ==
- The War Sofa (Das Kriegssofa) (1914)
- The Dancer (Die Tänzerin) (1915)
- Das Unheimliche Zimmer (The Uncanny Room) (1915), as Miss Lyons
- And You Still Wander Restlessly (Und wandern sollst During ruhelos..) (1915)
- Ein Blatt Paper (1916)
- Your Dearest Enemy (Ihr liebster Feind) (1916)
- One or the Other (Der oder der?) (1919)
- The Red Poster (1920), as Marion Diabelli
- Man and Woman (1920), as The Duchess
- Miss 139 (1922), as The squirrel
- Ballettratten (1925), as Prima Ballerina Bellini
