= Trude (film) =

1926 film

- Directed by: Conrad Wiene
- Written by: Johannes Brandt; Conrad Wiene
- Starring: Olga Chekhova; Max Landa; Paul Morgan
- Cinematography: Julius Balting
- Production company: Continental-Film
- Distributed by: Continental-Film
- Release date: 28 May 1926
- Country: Germany
- Languages: Silent; German intertitles

Trude (German: Trude, die Sechzehnjährige) is a 1926 German silent film directed by Conrad Wiene and starring Olga Chekhova, Max Landa and Paul Morgan.

The film's sets were designed by the art director Robert A. Dietrich.

== Cast ==
- Olga Chekhova
- Max Landa
- Paul Morgan
- Anny Ondra
- Adele Sandrock
- Jack Trevor
- Henry Bender
- Karl Platen
- Albert Paulig
- Olga Engl
- Karl Victor Plagge
- Ernst Rückert

== Bibliography ==
- Hans-Michael Bock and Tim Bergfelder. The Concise Cinegraph: An Encyclopedia of German Cinema. Berghahn Books.
