= The Devil (1918 German film) =

1918 film directed by E. A. Dupont

- Directed by: E. A. Dupont
- Written by: E. A. Dupont
- Starring: Max Landa; Gustav Botz; Tzwetta Tzatschewa
- Cinematography: Victoria Cocias
- Production company: Stern-Film
- Release date: 27 December 1918
- Country: Germany
- Languages: Silent; German intertitles

The Devil (German: Der Teufel) is a 1918 German silent mystery film directed by E. A. Dupont and starring Max Landa, Gustav Botz, and Tzwetta Tzatschewa.

== Cast ==
- Max Landa as Detektiv
- Gustav Botz as Richard Herter
- Tzwetta Tzatschewa as Francis Herter, seine Tochter
- Emil Rameau as Robert, sein Privatsekretär
- Bram Meynadier as Victor Farol, ein Artist unter dem Namen "Der Teufel"
- Poldi Augustin as Frau Alix, deren Mutter
- Werner Hollmann as John Graham, Lawyer
- Guido Herzfeld as Dr. Johnston
- Helene Voß as Tine, Wirtschafterin des Detektivs
- Ria Jende as Susanne, Zofe im Hause Herters
- Henry Bender as Journalist
- Albert Kühne as Schutzmann
- Rudolf Meinhard-Jünger as Zweiter Journalist
- Carl Neisser as Zweiter Schutzmann
- Hans Senius as Kriminalkommissar

== Bibliography ==
- Bock, Hans-Michael; Bergfelder, Tim, eds. (2009). The Concise Cinegraph: Encyclopaedia of German Cinema. New York: Berghahn Books. ISBN 978-1-57181-655-9.
