= In the Name of the Kaisers =

1925 film directed by Robert Dinesen

- Directed by: Robert Dinesen
- Written by: Max Jungk; Julius Urgiß; Paul Urgiß
- Starring: Lya De Putti; Hermann Vallentin; Jenny Marba
- Cinematography: Julius Balting
- Production company: Phoebus Film
- Distributed by: Phoebus Film
- Release date: 18 February 1925
- Country: Germany
- Languages: Silent; German intertitles

In the Name of the Kaisers (German: Im Namen des Kaisers) is a 1925 German silent film directed by Robert Dinesen and starring Lya De Putti, Hermann Vallentin, and Jenny Marba.

== Cast ==
- Lya De Putti as Sonja Smirnow, Studentin der Medizin
- Hermann Vallentin as Ihr Vater
- Jenny Marba as Ihre Mutter
- Erich Kaiser-Titz as Der Kaiser
- Susi Pallas as Der Kronprinz
- Anna Gorina as Die Kaiserin
- Gertrud Arnold as Fürstin Michailow
- Hans Adalbert Schlettow as Ihr Neffe Borris, Leutnant der Leibgarde
- Ernst Rückert as Fedor
- Harry Hardt as Nicolai, Borris' Freund
- Martin Hartwig as Der Adjutant des Kaiseers
- Leopold von Ledebur as Der Oberst der Leibgarde
- Karl Steller as Ein alter Diener
- Paul Rehkopf

== Bibliography ==
- Bock, Hans-Michael; Bergfelder, Tim, eds. (2009). The Concise Cinegraph: Encyclopaedia of German Cinema. New York: Berghahn Books. ISBN 978-1-57181-655-9.
