= Wallenstein (film) =

1925 film

- Directed by: Rolf Randolf
- Produced by: Gustav Althoff
- Starring: Fritz Greiner; Eduard von Winterstein; Ernst Rückert
- Cinematography: Axel Graatkjær
- Production companies: Althoff & Company
- Distributed by: Althoff & Company
- Release date: 20 May 1925 (Part I)
- Country: Germany
- Languages: Silent; German intertitles

Wallenstein is a 1925 German silent historical film directed by Rolf Randolf and starring Fritz Greiner, Eduard von Winterstein, and Ernst Rückert. It was shot at the EFA Studios in Berlin. The film's sets were designed by the art director Robert A. Dietrich.

It depicts the life of the Imperial General Albrecht von Wallenstein during the Thirty Years War. It was released in two separate parts, as was common for epics during the era.

== Cast ==
- Fritz Greiner as Wallenstein
- Eduard von Winterstein as Terzky
- Ernst Rückert as Karl, sein Sohn
- Christian Bummerstedt as Max Piccolomini
- Fritz Kampers as Isolani
- Wolfgang von Schwind as Buttler
- Erna Morena as Isabella Wallenstein
- Claire Rommer as Maria, ihre Schwester
- Erich Kaiser-Titz as Kaiser Ferdinand
- Magnus Stifter as Octavio Piccolomini
- Ferdinand von Alten as Questenberg
- Leopold von Ledebur as Gustav Adolf von Schweden
- Leo Connard as Pater Lamormain
- Franz Wilhelm Schröder-Schrom as Illo
- Gustav Senger as Seni, der Astronom
- Georg Paeschke as Rittmeister Neumann
- Margarete Schön
- Lia Eibenschütz

== Bibliography ==
- Kasten, Jürgen; Bruns, Brigitte (2005). Erna Morena. Munich: Belleville. ISBN 978-3-936298-52-9.
