= Whitechapel (film) =

1920 film directed by Ewald André Dupont

- Directed by: Ewald André Dupont
- Written by: Max Jungk; Julius Urgiß
- Produced by: Hanns Lippmann
- Starring: Guido Herzfeld; Hans Mierendorff; Otto Gebühr; Hermann Wlach
- Cinematography: Karl Hasselmann
- Production company: Gloria-Film
- Distributed by: UFA
- Release date: 30 September 1920
- Country: Germany
- Languages: Silent; German intertitles

Whitechapel is a 1920 German silent crime film directed by Ewald André Dupont and starring Guido Herzfeld, Hans Mierendorff, and Otto Gebühr. The film was set around a variety theatre in London's East End suburb of Whitechapel.

== Cast ==
- Guido Herzfeld as Der alte Feibel
- Hans Mierendorff as Fred Hopkins
- Otto Gebühr as Baron Harry
- Hermann Wlach as Jac
- Fritz Schulz as David
- Lu Juergens as Mintje
- Rudolf Lettinger as Komissar
- Fritz Beckmann
- Henry Bender as Tom
- Carl Clewing as Lord
- Leo Connard as Juwelier
- Carl Geppert as Will
- Grit Hegesa as Rahel
- Adolf E. Licho as Brillantenhändler van Zuider
- Julia Serda
- Ferry Sikla as Juwelenhändler Blocker
- Marga von Kierska as Cecil Readings Verlobte

== Bibliography ==
- Bergfelder, Tim; Cargnelli, Christian, eds. (2008). Destination London: German-Speaking Emigrés and British Cinema, 1925–1950. New York: Berghahn Books. ISBN 978-0-85745-019-7.
- Kreimeier, Klaus (1999). The Ufa Story: A History of Germany's Greatest Film Company, 1918–1945. Berkeley: University of California Press. ISBN 978-0-520-22069-0.
