= Murder Without Cause =

1921 film directed by E. A. Dupont

- German: Der Mord ohne Täter
- Directed by: E. A. Dupont
- Written by: E. A. Dupont; Paul Rosenhayn
- Produced by: Hanns Lippmann
- Starring: Hermann Vallentin; Paul Richter; Hanni Weisse
- Cinematography: Karl Hasselmann
- Production company: Gloria-Film
- Distributed by: UFA
- Release date: 2 January 1921
- Country: Germany
- Languages: Silent; German intertitles

Murder Without Cause (German: Der Mord ohne Täter) is a 1921 German silent crime film directed by E. A. Dupont and starring Hermann Vallentin, Paul Richter and Hanni Weisse.

The film's sets were designed by the art directors Robert A. Dietrich and Jack Winter.

== Cast ==
- Hermann Vallentin as Mr. Powell, Chef der Zeitung 'Die Menschheit'
- Paul Richter as Editor Murphy
- Hanni Weisse as Alice
- Henry Bender as Doctor Kent
- Peter Esser
- Bernhard Goetzke
- Charles Puffy as Bill
- Magda Madeleine as Florence Gatty
- Fritz Schulz as Bobby Stanley

== See also ==
- The Man Who Dared (1946)
- Beyond a Reasonable Doubt (1956)
- The Life of David Gale (2003)
