= Child on the Open Road =

1919 film directed by Richard Eichberg

- Directed by: Richard Eichberg
- Written by: Arthur Teuber
- Produced by: Richard Eichberg
- Starring: Fred Goebel; Leontine Kühnberg; Kurt Halden
- Cinematography: Max Terno
- Production company: Richard Eichberg-Film
- Distributed by: Central-Film-Vertriebs
- Release date: 12 February 1919
- Country: Germany
- Languages: Silent; German intertitles

Child on the Open Road (German: Kinder der Landstraße) is a 1919 German silent film directed by Richard Eichberg and starring Fred Goebel, Leontine Kühnberg and Kurt Halden.

The film's sets were designed by the art director Willi Herrmann.

== Cast ==
- Fred Goebel
- Leontine Kühnberg
- Kurt Halden
- Carl Gerhard Schröder
- Frau Lehndorf-Schöttle
- Hermann Vallentin

== Bibliography ==
- Bock, Hans-Michael & Bergfelder, Tim. The Concise CineGraph. Encyclopedia of German Cinema. Berghahn Books, 2009.
