= Johanna Terwin =

German actress

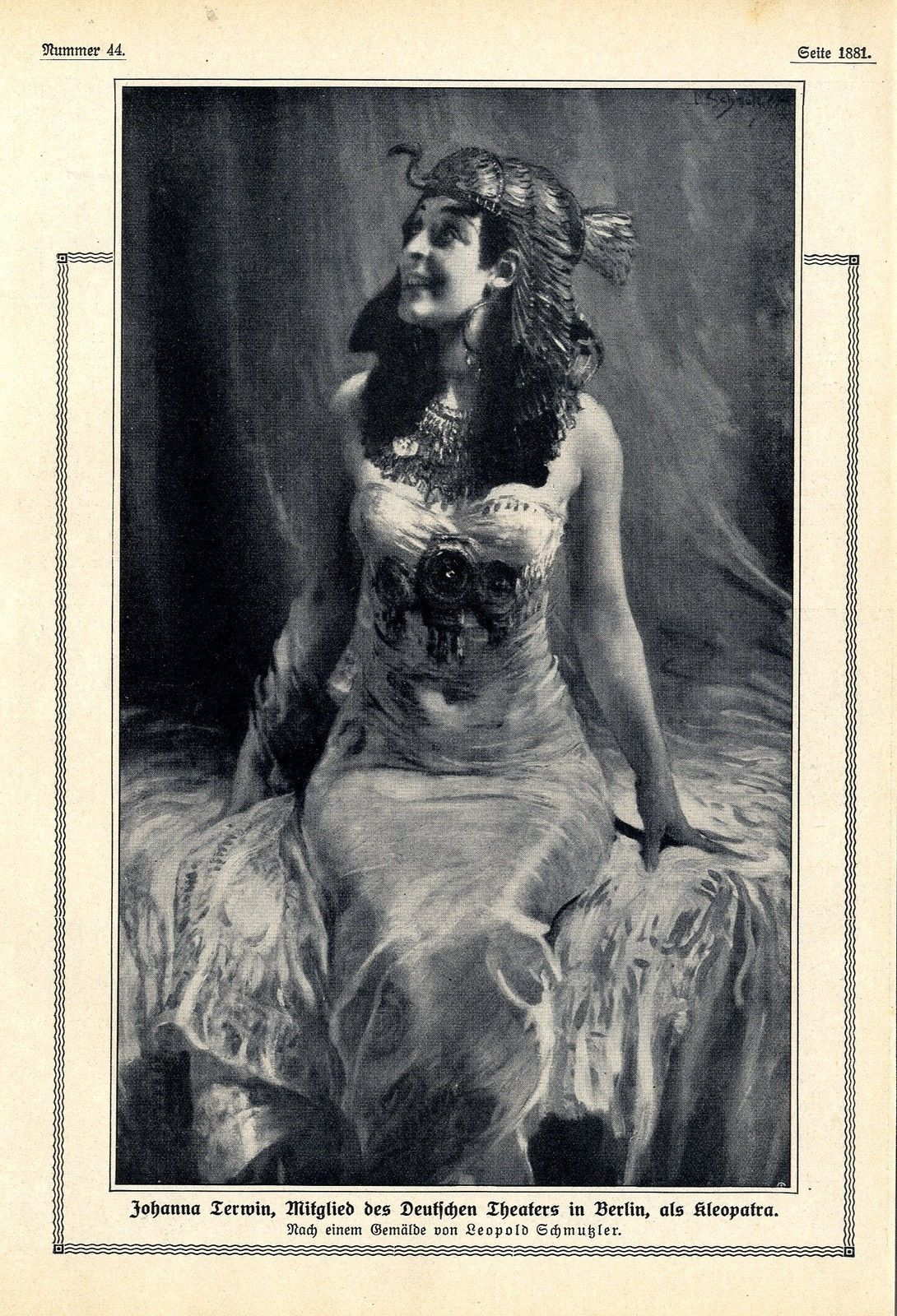
- as Cleopatra
- Born: 18 March 1884; Kaiserslautern, German Empire
- Died: 4 January 1962 (aged 77); Zurich, Switzerland
- Occupation: Actress
- Years active: 1913–1961 (film)

Johanna Terwin (1884–1962) was a German stage and film actress. In the theatre she appeared in works by the impresario Max Reinhardt. She appeared in around twenty films during the silent and sound eras.

She was married to the Albanian-born actor Alessandro Moissi.

== Selected filmography ==
- Laugh Bajazzo (1915)
- Cain (1918)
- The Spies (1919)
- A Thousand for One Night (1933)
- Harvest (1936)
- Flowers from Nice (1936)
- Premiere (1937)

== Bibliography ==
- J. L. Styan. Max Reinhardt. CUP Archive, 1982.
