= Alkohol =

1919 German film

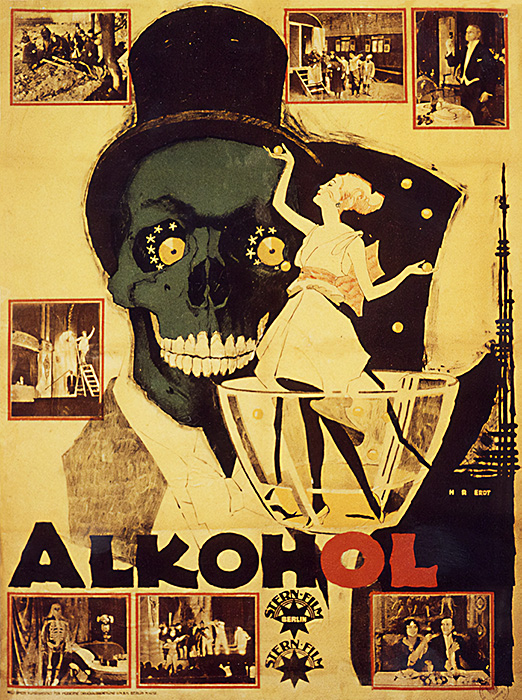
- Directed by: Ewald André Dupont; Alfred Lind
- Written by: Ewald André Dupont; Alfred Lind
- Starring: Wilhelm Diegelmann; Ernst Rückert; Georg H. Schnell; Emil Biron
- Cinematography: Karl Hasselmann; Charles Paulus
- Production company: Stern-Film
- Release date: 1919
- Country: Germany
- Languages: Silent; German intertitles

Alkohol ('Alcohol') is a 1919 German silent drama film directed by Ewald André Dupont and Alfred Lind and starring Wilhelm Diegelmann, Ernst Rückert, and Georg H. Schnell. The film was begun by Lind but finished by Dupont. It was his first major melodrama, and represented a breakthrough in his career. The film's theme and setting foreshadow much of his later work. It was one in a series of "Enlightenment films" examining social issues, which were produced around the time. It premiered at the Marmorhaus in Berlin.

== Synopsis ==
A middle-class man falls in love with a woman from a more ordinary background, and they end up working in a variety act where they sink into alcoholism. He then kills another man who he mistakenly believes is a rival.

== Cast ==
- Wilhelm Diegelmann
- Ernst Rückert
- Georg H. Schnell
- Emil Birron
- Jean Moreau
- Auguste Pünkösdy
- Ferry Sikla
- Toni Tetzlaff
- Hanni Weisse
- Maria Zelenka

== Bibliography ==
- Bergfelder, Tim; Cargnelli, Christian, eds. (2008). Destination London: German-Speaking Emigrés and British Cinema, 1925–1950. New York: Berghahn Books. ISBN 978-0-85745-019-7.
- Prawer, Siegbert Salomon (2005). Between Two Worlds: The Jewish Presence in German and Austrian Film, 1910–1933. New York: Berghahn Books. ISBN 978-1-84545-074-8.
