= Ernst Rückert =

German actor (1886–1945)

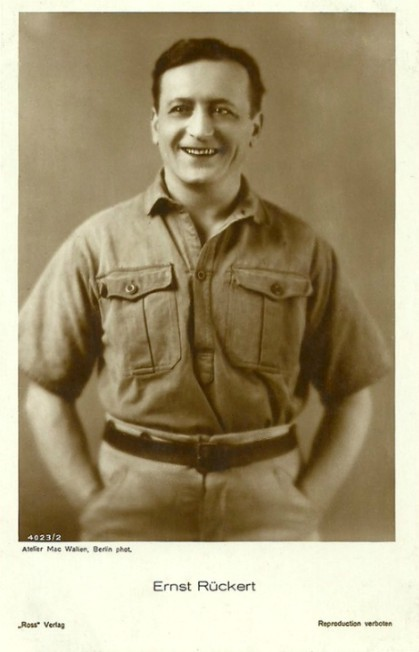
- Postcard portrait, c. 1929
- Born: Anton Ernst Rücker; 20 December 1886; Berlin, German Empire
- Died: 3 September 1945 (aged 58); Berlin, Germany
- Occupation: Actor
- Years active: 1908–1943

Anton Ernst Rückert (20 December 1886 – 3 September 1945) was a German stage and film actor.

Rückert began his theatre career in 1908 and has appeared on the stage in Bleicherode, Königsberg and Kiel, among others. In 1910 he took up an engagement at the Luisentheatre in Berlin.

From 1910 he was a sought-after silent film actor, initially in leading roles. In 1912 he played the first officer of the Titanic in the film In Nacht und Eis. From 1914 to 1917 he served in the military in the First World War. He then continued his film career and continued to receive leading roles and important supporting roles.

In the 1930s, Rückert became a character actor in film, and he only rarely received engagements in the theatre. In 1940 he was drafted, between 1941 and 1942 he was engaged as an actor and director at the Berlin Tourneetheater Gastspielirektion IX. Shortly afterwards, he was assigned to the KdF Front Theatre.

Rückert hanged himself a few months after the end of the Second World War in his apartment in Berlin. He was found dead on 3 September 1945.

== Selected filmography ==
- The Mask (1919)
- Alkohol (1919)
- Maria Pavlowna (1919)
- The War of the Oxen (1920)
- Romeo and Juliet in the Snow (1920)
- The Testament of Billions (1920)
- World by the Throat (1920)
- The Face Removed (1920)
- The Dancer of Jaipur (1920)
- The Eyes as the Accuser (1920)
- Destiny (1921)
- The Fateful Day (1921)
- Alfred von Ingelheim's Dramatic Life (1921)
- The Woman from the Orient (1923)
- The Emperor's Old Clothes (1923)
- The Way to the Light (1923)
- Judith (1923)
- Malva (1924)
- The Stolen Professor (1924)
- Za La Mort (1924)
- People in Need (1925)
- Ash Wednesday (1925)
- In the Name of the Kaisers (1925)
- Bismarck (1925)
- What the Stones Tell (1925)
- The Old Ballroom (1925)
- Wallenstein (1925)
- Trude (1926)
- The Eleven Schill Officers (1926)
- The Schimeck Family (1926)
- Love's Joys and Woes (1926)
- Nixchen (1926)
- On the Banks of the River Weser (1927)
- The Pink Slippers (1927)
- That Was Heidelberg on Summer Nights (1927)
- Lützow's Wild Hunt (1927)
- The Impostor (1927)
- Die Hochstaplerin (1927)
- The Standard-Bearer of Sedan (1927)
- I Stand in the Dark Midnight (1927)
- Luther (1928)
- Rasputin (1928)
- Roses Bloom on the Moorland (1929)
- What a Woman Dreams of in Springtime (1929)
- Namensheirat (1930)
- Marriage in Name Only (1930)
- Duty Is Duty (1931)
- Marshal Forwards (1932)
- The Eleven Schill Officers (1932)
- At the Strasbourg (1934)
- A Woman With Power of Attorney (1934)
- The Valiant Navigator (1935)
