= Maria Pavlowna =

- Directed by: Emil Justitz
- Written by: Irbi-Orglu (novel); Karl Singer; Rudolf Strauß
- Produced by: Emil Justitz
- Starring: Maria Fein; Ernst Rückert; Ernst Stahl-Nachbaur
- Cinematography: Helmar Lerski
- Production company: Justitz-Film
- Distributed by: Justitz-Film
- Release date: 14 August 1919
- Country: Germany
- Languages: Silent; German intertitles

Maria Pavlowna is a 1919 German silent drama film directed by Emil Justitz and starring Maria Fein, Ernst Rückert and Ernst Stahl-Nachbaur. It premiered at the Marmorhaus in Berlin.

== Cast ==
- Maria Fein as Maria Pavlowna
- Ernst Rückert as Boris Lensky
- Ernst Stahl-Nachbaur as Polizist Maximowitsch
- Kurt Walter as Sergej
- Ray Walton as Alexandra

== Bibliography ==
- Paolo Caneppele. Entscheidungen der Tiroler Filmzensur 1919-1920-1921: mit einem Index der in Tirol verbotenen Filme 1916-1922. Film Archiv Austria, 2002.
