= Anita Jo =

1919 film directed by Dimitri Buchowetzki

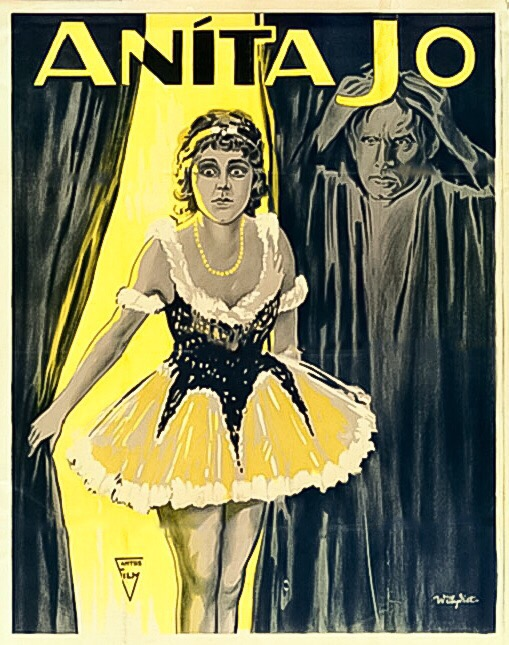
- Directed by: Dimitri Buchowetzki
- Written by: Dimitri Buchowetzki
- Starring: Bernhard Goetzke; Charles Willy Kayser; Hanni Weisse
- Cinematography: Arpad Viragh
- Production company: Fantos-Film
- Release date: 1919
- Country: Germany
- Languages: Silent; German intertitles

Anita Jo is a 1919 German silent crime film directed by Dimitri Buchowetzki and starring Bernhard Goetzke, Charles Willy Kayser, and Hanni Weisse.

== Cast ==
- Bernhard Goetzke as Erik Solmes, Prosecutor
- Charles Willy Kayser as Tänzer Tomsen
- Hanni Weisse as Anita Jo
- Lydia Potokaja as Scharfschützin Lola
- Otto Treptow as Clown Pipo
- Elsa Wagner as Mutter, Frau Somes

== Bibliography ==
- Parish, James Robert; Canham, Kingsley (1976). Film Directors Guide: Western Europe. Metuchen, NJ: Scarecrow Press. ISBN 978-0-8108-0908-6.
