= Gustav Botz =

German actor

- Gustav Botz in Nosferatu (1922)
- Born: 4 August 1883; Bremen, German Empire
- Died: 29 September 1932 (aged 49); Bremen, Weimar Republic
- Occupation: Actor
- Years active: 1914-1924

Gustav Botz (4 August 1883 – 29 September 1932) was a German actor.

== Early life and career ==
Botz was born on 4 August 1883 at Bremen, German Empire.

Botz began his career in the film business. Some of his films include The Foreign Prince (1918), The Devil (1918), His Majesty the Hypochondriac (1918), Ikarus, the Flying Man (1918), The Rose of Stamboul (1919), The Secret of the American Docks (1919), The Head of Janus (1920), Monika Vogelsang (1920), Battle of the Sexes (1920), Mary Magdalene (1920), Catherine the Great (1920), The Courier from Lisbon (1921), Peter Voss, Their of Millions (1921), The Eternal Struggle (1921), Lola Montez, the King's Dancer (1922), Dr. Mabuse the Gambler (1922), and Nosferatu (1922). His last film role was in 1924's My Leopold and Botz retired from the film business.

== Personal life and death ==
On the 29 September 1932, After suffering unknown disease, Botz died at Bremen, Weimar Republic at the age 49. His death certificate named the cause of death as "Physically induced brain injury". His body was cremated and his ashes were given to his family

== Selected filmography ==
- The Foreign Prince (1918)
- The Devil (1918)
- His Majesty the Hypochondriac (1918)
- Ikarus, the Flying Man (1918)
- The Rose of Stamboul (1919)
- The Secret of the American Docks (1919)
- The Head of Janus (1920)
- Monika Vogelsang (1920)
- Battle of the Sexes (1920)
- Mary Magdalene (1920)
- Catherine the Great (1920)
- The Courier from Lisbon (1921)
- Peter Voss, Thief of Millions (1921)
- The Eternal Struggle (1921)
- Lola Montez, the King's Dancer (1922)
- Dr. Mabuse the Gambler (1922)
- Nosferatu (1922)
- My Leopold (1924)

== Bibliography ==
- Eisner, Lotte H. The Haunted Screen: Expressionism in the German Cinema and the Influence of Max Reinhardt. University of California Press, 2008.
