= The Spies (1919 film) =

- Directed by: Ewald André Dupont
- Written by: Ewald André Dupont
- Starring: Max Landa; Johanna Terwin; Hanni Weisse
- Cinematography: Charles Paulus
- Production company: Stern-Film
- Release date: 17 October 1919
- Country: Germany
- Languages: Silent; German intertitles

The Spies (German: Die Spione) is a 1919 German crime film directed by Ewald André Dupont and starring Max Landa, Johanna Terwin and Hanni Weisse.

The film's sets were designed by the art director Robert A. Dietrich.

== Cast ==
- Max Landa as Detektiv
- Johanna Terwin as Marion
- Emil Rameau as Dr. Mahon
- Bernhard Goetzke as Jean Babtiste, politische Agenten
- Arthur Beder as Jean Babtiste
- Paul Biensfeldt as Dunkle Existenz
- Hanni Weisse

== Bibliography ==
- Hans-Michael Bock and Tim Bergfelder. The Concise Cinegraph: An Encyclopedia of German Cinema. Berghahn Books, 2009.
