= The Apache of Marseilles =

1919 film directed by Ewald André Dupont

- German: Die Apachen
- Directed by: Ewald André Dupont
- Written by: Ewald André Dupont
- Starring: Max Landa; Hanni Weisse; Reinhold Schünzel
- Cinematography: Charles Paulus
- Production company: Stern-Film
- Release date: 18 July 1919
- Country: Germany
- Languages: Silent; German intertitles

The Apache of Marseilles (German: Die Apachen) is a 1919 German silent thriller film directed by Ewald André Dupont and starring Max Landa, Hanni Weisse, and Reinhold Schünzel.

== Plot ==
Banker Jules Coupeau is travelling to France on a luxury liner, carrying a diamond necklace of immeasurable value. He befriends a detective who is travelling with him, and they check into the Hotel Cosmopolite in Marseilles. There, the notorious criminal Badinguet, an Apache, plans to steal the jewellery. With the help of his lover Gervaise, he tries to lure the detective out of town. At first, the detective falls in love with Gervaise. But then he realises what could happen and travels back to Marseille to help the banker. In a fight to the death, Gervaise throws herself in front of the detective and is fatally shot. The detective wins the ensuing duel.

== Cast ==
- Max Landa as Detektiv
- Hanni Weisse as Apachin Gervaise
- Reinhold Schünzel as Apache Badinguet
- Max Laurence
- Fritz Ruß
- Andreas Van Horn

== Bibliography ==
- Grange, William (2008). Cultural Chronicle of the Weimar Republic. Lanham, MD: Scarecrow Press. ISBN 978-0-8108-5967-8.
