= Paul Graetz =

German film actor (1889–1937)

- Born: Paul Felix Graetz; 4 August 1889; Berlin, German Empire
- Died: 16 February 1937 (aged 47); Hollywood, California, United States
- Occupations: Presenter, actor, cabaret performer
- Years active: 1909–1937

Paul Graetz or Paul Grätz (4 August 1889 – 16 February 1937) was a German actor and comedian star of the Weimar cabaret.

== Exile and Death ==
In 1933, he was exiled from Germany by the Nazi regime. "Half Berlin had laughed at his jokes," wrote his friend Erika Mann 1939, "and called him 'our Paul.' The Nazis, however, regarded him as an 'alien element'; 'our Paul' was banished."

Graetz died in Hollywood in 1937. "most likely," wrote Mann, "his heart had not been able to endure the long absence from Berlin. He could act no longer."

Max Reinhardt delivered a eulogy at Graetz's funeral.

== Partial filmography ==
- The Peruvian (1919) - Sonnenschein - spekulant
- Die Gelbe Fratze (1919) - Buckliger
- Der Doppelmord von Sarajewo (1920) - Javrilo Princip
- Mary Magdalene (1920) - Der alte Schneider
- Pension Lautenschlag (1920) - Paukenschläger
- The Princess of the Nile (1920) - Thobin
- The Marriage of Figaro (1920) - Bassillo
- Sumurun (1920) - Pufti, 2nd Servant of Nur-al-Djin
- Sehnsucht (1920)
- Christian Wahnschaffe (1920)
- Die Beichte einer Toten (1920) - Kritiker
- The House on the Moon (1921) - Kornill - Schauspieler
- The Wildcat (1921) - Zofano
- Aus dem Schwarzbuch eines Polizeikommissars (1921, part 2)
- Your Bad Reputation (1922)
- She and the Three (1922) - Der Regisseur
- Monna Vanna (1922) - Gennezzano
- Die Fledermaus (1923) - Botenjunge
- Resurrection (1923)
- Tragedy of Love (1923)
- The Countess of Paris (1923)
- A Woman, an Animal, a Diamond (1923)
- I.N.R.I. (1923) - Jairus
- Debit and Credit (1924) - Veitel Itzig
- Doctor Wislizenus (1924) - Iltis
- The Man in the Saddle (1945) - Manager
- The Woman in Gold (1926)
- Three Cuckoo Clocks (1926) - Hotel Manager
- The Three Mannequins (1926) - Lagerist Meyer
- Kissing Is No Sin (1926) - Paul Polizzer
- Les voleurs de gloire (1926)
- Department Store Princess (1926)
- A Crazy Night (1927) - Pille, Apotheker in Essig an der Gurke
- The Impostor (1927) - Juwelier
- The Pink Slippers (1927) - Sally Löwenherz
- The Champion of the World (1927)
- The Indiscreet Woman (1927) - Noel
- The Great Leap (1927) - Paule
- Moral (1928) - Polizeischreiber Reisacher
- Sixteen Daughters and No Father (1928)
- Struggle for the Matterhorn (1928) - Luc Meynet - der Bucklige
- Trust of Thieves (1929) - Einbrecher
- The Veil Dancer (1929)
- Vienna, City of Song (1930) - Piefke, Reisender aus Berlin
- Two Worlds (1930) - Schumacher Mendel
- Mary (1931) - Bobby Brown
- The Yellow House of Rio (1931) - Phlegmatiker
- Gesangverein Sorgenfrei (1931) - Paul
- Mountains on Fire (1931)
- Red Wagon (1933) - Max Schultze
- The Scotland Yard Mystery (1934) - Isaac Frenton (uncredited)
- Blossom Time (1934) - Alois Wimpassinger
- Jew Süss (1934) - Landauer
- Murder at Monte Carlo (1935) - Dr. Heinrich Becker
- Mimi (1935) - Durand
- 18 Minutes (1935) - Pietro
- Bulldog Jack (1935) - Salvini
- Heart's Desire (1935) - Florian
- Mr. Cohen Takes a Walk (1935) - Jake Cohen
- Car of Dreams (1935) - Mr. Hart
- Public Enemy's Wife (1936) - Mr. Schultz - Tailor (uncredited)
- Hot Money (1936) - Dr. David
- Bengal Tiger (1936) - Carl Homan
- Isle of Fury (1936) - Captain Deever
- Black Legion (1937) - minor role, scenes deleted scenes
