= The Derby (1919 film) =

- Directed by: Ewald André Dupont
- Written by: Ewald André Dupont
- Starring: Max Landa; Hermann Picha; Hanni Weisse
- Cinematography: Charles Paulus
- Production company: Stern-Film
- Release date: 28 November 1919
- Country: Germany
- Languages: Silent; German intertitles

The Derby (German: Das Derby) is a 1919 German silent mystery sports film directed by Ewald André Dupont and starring Max Landa, Hermann Picha and Hanni Weisse.

The film's sets were designed by the art director Robert A. Dietrich.

== Cast ==
- Max Landa as Detektiv
- Hermann Picha as Ike Thurton, Trainer
- Hanni Weisse as Daisy
- Hellmut Kraus as Jockey
- Bram Meynadier as Fletcher
- Leo Connard
- Wilhelm Diegelmann
- Kurt Keller-Nebri
- Maria Stork

== Bibliography ==
- Bock, Hans-Michael & Bergfelder, Tim. The Concise CineGraph. Encyclopedia of German Cinema. Berghahn Books, 2009.
