= The Duty to Live =

1919 film directed by Carl Wilhelm

- Directed by: Carl Wilhelm
- Written by: Robert Liebmann
- Produced by: Fritz Deitz
- Starring: Magnus Stifter; Margarete Schön; Reinhold Schünzel
- Cinematography: Karl Wieghorst
- Production companies: Internationaler Filmvertrieb Dietz; Olympia Film
- Release date: November 1919
- Country: Germany
- Languages: Silent; German intertitles

The Duty to Live (German: Die Pflicht zu leben) is a 1919 German silent film directed by Carl Wilhelm and starring Magnus Stifter, Margarete Schön, Reinhold Schünzel.

== Cast ==
- Hanne Brinkmann
- Guido Herzfeld
- Margarete Schön
- Reinhold Schünzel
- Gustav Adolf Semler
- Magnus Stifter

== Bibliography ==
- Bock, Hans-Michael; Bergfelder, Tim, eds. (2009). The Concise Cinegraph: Encyclopaedia of German Cinema. New York: Berghahn Books. ISBN 978-1-57181-655-9.
