= The Carousel of Life =

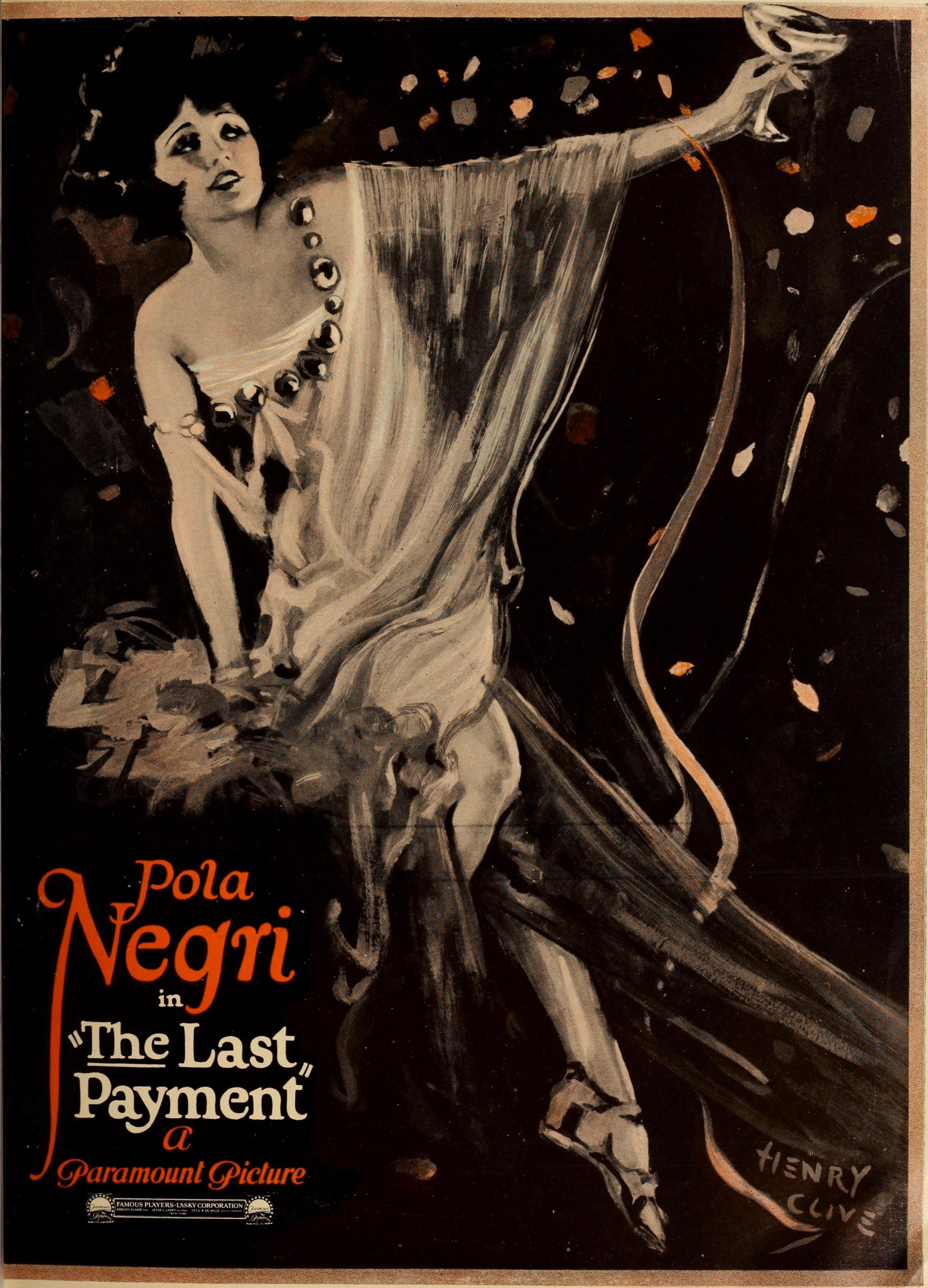
- American advertisement
- German: Das Karussell des Lebens
- Directed by: Georg Jacoby
- Produced by: Paul Davidson
- Starring: Pola Negri; Harry Liedtke; Reinhold Schünzel
- Production company: PAGU
- Distributed by: UFA
- Release date: March 1919
- Country: Germany
- Languages: Silent; German intertitles

The Carousel of Life (German: Das Karussell des Lebens) is a 1919 German silent drama film directed by Georg Jacoby and starring Pola Negri, Harry Liedtke, and Reinhold Schünzel. In the United States, it is also known by the alternative title of The Last Payment. It is now considered to be a lost film.

It was shot at the Tempelhof Studios in Berlin.

== Plot ==
As described in a film magazine, Iola, a beautiful woman of the Latin Quarter, marries a rich cattle owner Pedro Maurez from South America to live in peace and happiness. The arrival of young Parisian Paul Durand whets her interest again in the old haunts of Paris. When her husband is slain in an uprising of laborers, she is again thrown on her own resources. She travels to Paris with the young businessman and, upon their arrival, she is sheltered by the youth's father Henri (Patry). Here she meets her former husband Jules Lambert who is secretary to Henri. The former husband, by his wife Iola's extravagance, had been led to defaulting trust funds. Her host and son both fall in love with her and her former husband stands like a Nemesis in the background. On the night of a carnival, where Iola is made queen of the festivities, the secretary confesses his past to Paul, telling of his imprisonment for larceny and his efforts to live down his past. Paul steps up to box at the carnival and sees his father embrace Iola. So horrified is the young man at the sight and of his own unrequited love that he kills himself almost at the feet of the couple. But Iola is feted and showered with flowers until the grim tragedy drives her from the ball room and into the night. She is confused and falls before a train, making her last payment.

== Cast ==
- Pola Negri as Iola
- Harry Liedtke as Paul Durand
- Reinhold Schünzel as Jules Lambert
- Leopold von Ledebur as Pedro Maurez
- Albert Patry (uncredited)
