= Max Landa =

German actor

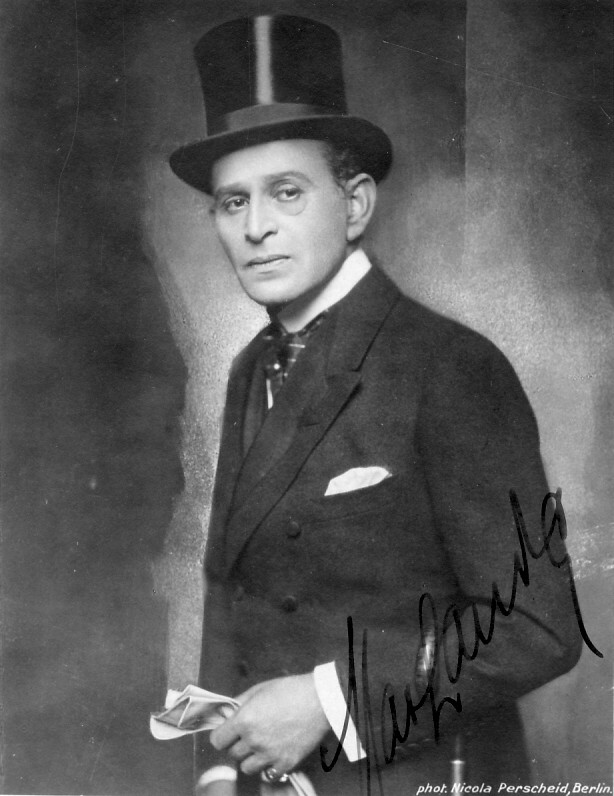
- Landa photographed in 1920 by Nicola Perscheid
- Born: 24 April 1873; Minsk, Russian Empire
- Died: 8 November 1933 (aged 60); Bled, Drava Banovina; Kingdom of Yugoslavia
- Other name: Max Landau
- Occupation: Actor
- Years active: 1913–1928 (film)
- Spouse: Margot Walter

Max Landa (Belarusian: Макс Ландаў; 24 April 1873 – 8 November 1933; born Max Landau) was a Jewish Russian-born Austrian silent film and stage actor.

== Career ==
Landa attended the Handelsakademie (commercial academy) in Vienna and took classes with acting teacher Karl Arnau in the same city. After working as a bank clerk for a short period, he decided to focus on his acting career in 1893. After working at various theatres in Austria and Germany for about twenty years he was discovered in Berlin as leading man by movie star Asta Nielsen with whom he played in several movies directed by Urban Gad.

When Joe May founded his own film production company in 1915 he formed a contract with Max Landa who became the first of a number of actors to play the role of the fictional British detective Joe Deebs, created as a rival to Sherlock Holmes during the silent era. Landa and his wife Margot Walter fled Germany following the Nazi seizure of power in 1933, and he committed suicide in exile in Yugoslavia.

== Selected filmography ==
- The Man in the Cellar (1914)
- Die geheimnisvolle Villa (1914)
- Cinderella (1916)
- The Onyx Head (1917)
- Midnight (1918)
- Europe, General Delivery (1918)
- The Devil (1918)
- The Apache of Marseilles (1919)
- The Japanese Woman (1919)
- The Secret of the American Docks (1919)
- The Mask (1919)
- The Derby (1919)
- The Spies (1919)
- World by the Throat (1920)
- The Bandits of Asnières (1920)
- Moriturus (1920)
- The Chameleon (1920)
- The Grand Babylon Hotel (1920)
- Roswolsky's Mistress (1921)
- The Experiment of Professor Mithrany (1921)
- The Passenger in Compartment Seven (1922)
- Flight Around the World (1925)
- The Woman without Money (1925)
- Trude (1926)
- Marriage Announcement (1926)
- Why Get a Divorce? (1926)
- Light-Hearted Isabel (1927)
- Anastasia, the False Czar's Daughter (1928)
- The Hangman (1928)
- Endangered Girls (1928)

== Bibliography ==
- Isenberg, Noah William. Weimar Cinema: An Essential Guide to Classic Films of the Era. Columbia University Press,2013.
- Prawer, S.S. Between Two Worlds: The Jewish Presence in German and Austrian Film, 1910-1933. Berghahn Books, 2005.
- Weniger, Kay: 'Es wird im Leben dir mehr genommen als gegeben ...' Lexikon der aus Deutschland und Österreich emigrierten Filmschaffenden 1933 bis 1945: Eine Gesamtübersicht. ACABUS Verlag, 2011, p. 75-77
