= The Mask (1919 film) =

1919 film directed by Ewald André Dupont

- Directed by: Ewald André Dupont
- Written by: Ewald André Dupont
- Starring: Max Landa; Lil Dagover; Gertrude Welcker
- Cinematography: Charles Paulus
- Production company: Stern-Film
- Release date: August 1919
- Country: Germany
- Languages: Silent; German intertitles

The Mask (German: Die Maske) is a 1919 German silent crime film directed by Ewald André Dupont and starring Max Landa, Lil Dagover and Gertrude Welcker.

== Cast ==
- Max Landa as Detektiv
- Eduard von Winterstein as Graf Campobello
- Gertrude Welcker as Delia Grace
- Ernst Rückert as Oberleutnant Gregory
- Fritz Schulz as Barneß, Gehilfe des Detektivs
- Eva Speyer as Gräfin Campobello
- Arthur Beder as Joe Franklin
- Lil Dagover
- Wilhelm Diegelmann
- Emil Rameau

== Bibliography ==
- Hans-Michael Bock and Tim Bergfelder. The Concise Cinegraph: An Encyclopedia of German Cinema. Berghahn Books, 2009.
