= Reinhold Schünzel =

German actor and director (1888–1954)

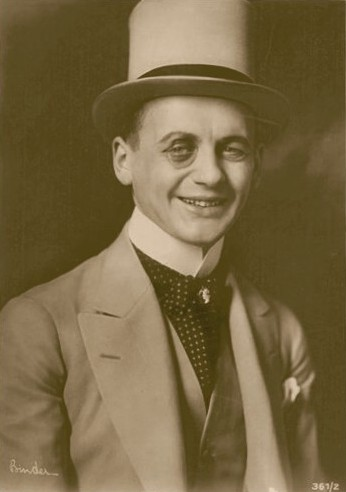
- Reinhold Schünzel in 1921
- Born: 7 November 1888; Hamburg, German Empire
- Died: 11 November 1954 (aged 66); Munich, West Germany
- Occupations: Actor, director, writer, producer
- Years active: 1916–1954 (film)

Reinhold Schünzel (7 November 1888 – 11 November 1954) was a German actor and director, active in both Germany and the United States. The son of a German father and a Jewish mother, he was born in St. Pauli, the poorest part of Hamburg. Despite his ancestry, Schünzel was allowed by the Nazis to continue making films for several years until he left in 1937 to live abroad.

== Biography ==
=== Life in Germany ===
Reinhold Schünzel (or Schuenzel) started his career as an actor in 1915 with a role in the film Werner Krafft. He directed his first film in 1918's Mary Magdalene and in 1920 directed The Girl from Acker Street and Catherine the Great. He was one of Germany's best-known silent film stars after World War I, a period during which films were significantly influenced by the consequences of the war. Schünzel performed in both comedies and dramas, often appearing as a villain or a powerful and corrupt man.

He was influenced by filmmakers such as his mentor Richard Oswald and Ernst Lubitsch, for whom he worked as an actor in the film Madame Dubarry in 1919.

Schünzel's work was very popular in Germany and the Nazi regime gave him the title of Ehrenarier or Honorary Aryan, allowing him to continue to direct and act despite his Jewish heritage (his mother was Jewish). He found that the government, first under Kaiser Wilhelm II and later under Adolf Hitler, interfered with his film projects, compelling him to leave in 1937. Schünzel described both the Kaiser and Hitler "persons of recognized authority and the worst possible dramatic taste."

=== In the United States ===
Schünzel came to the United States in 1937, and began his American career in Hollywood at Metro-Goldwyn-Mayer. Among the films he directed were Rich Man, Poor Girl (1938), Ice Follies (1939), Balalaika (1939), and New Wine (1941). He also acted in films like The Hitler Gang (1944), Dragonwyck (1946), and The Vicious Circle (1948), among others. His most memorable performance was as Dr. Anderson, a Nazi conspirator, in the film Notorious released in 1946. Schünzel went to New York in 1945 to make a debut on Broadway. He acted in Temper the Wind in 1946, and both appeared in Montserrat and starred in the Clifford Odets Broadway play The Big Knife in 1949.

Among the prizes he received was the Federal West German Film prize for the best supporting role in the movie My Father's Horses. He became a U.S citizen in 1943 and he returned to Germany in 1949.

== Personal life ==
Schünzel died of a heart attack in Munich, Germany.

His daughter Marianne Stewart was born in Berlin, and followed her father by becoming an actress. She appeared in Broadway plays and was known for The Facts of Life (1960), Hush...Hush, Sweet Charlotte (1964), and Time Table (1956).

== Filmography ==
=== German films ===
- The Grehn Case (1916) as Kriminalrat Rat Anheim
- Der Fall Hoop (1916) as Kriminalrat Anheim
- Bubi Is Jealous (1916) as Hellmut Hartleben
- Werner Krafft (1916) as Heinz Kleinschmidt
- The Confessions of the Green Mask (1916)
- The Uncanny House (1916, 3 parts) as Engelbert Fox / Ralph Robin, Privatdetektiv
- His Coquettish Wife (1916)
- Die Stricknadeln (1916)
- The Knitting Needles (1916)
- Under the Spell of Silence (1916)
- Your Dearest Enemy (1916)
- Benjamin the Timid (1916)
- The Night Talk (1917)
- The Newest Star of Variety (1917)
- The Coquette (1917) as Tertianer Rolf
- The Unmarried Woman (1917)
- The Lord of Hohenstein (1917)
- Mountain Air (1917) as Von Storch
- The Bracelet (1918) as Hausfreund
- Countess Kitchenmaid (1918) as Der Schüchterne
- Put to the Test (1918) as Reichsgraf Adolar von Warowingen
- In the Castle by the Lake (1918) as Erich von Strehsen
- Cain (1918)
- Spring Storms (1918) as Reinhold, Neffe von Königswart
- Midnight (1918) as Dick Tillinghaft, Reporter
- The Mirror of the World (1918) as Konkurrent
- The Ballet Girl (1918) as Eduard Stutzig, Lebemann
- Diary of a Lost Woman (1918) as Graf Kasimir Osdorff
- Let There Be Light (1918) as Fabrikbesitzer Kallenbach
- Film Kathi (1918)
- Crown and Whip (1919)
- Liebe, die sich frei verschenkt (1919)
- Prostitution (1919) as Karl Döring
- Around the World in Eighty Days (1919) as Archibald Corsican
- Different from the Others (1919) as Franz Bollek
- One or the Other (1919)
- The Carousel of Life (1919)
- The Apache of Marseilles (1919) as Apache Badinguet
- Hedda's Revenge (1919) as Georg
- The Peruvian (1919) as Egon Hartenstein
- A Night in Paradise (1919) as Ede
- Seelenverkäufer (1919) as Orville
- Blonde Poison (1919) as Adolf Reiss
- Die Prostitution, 2. Teil - Die sich verkaufen (1919)
- The Secret of Wera Baranska (1919)
- Madame Dubarry (1919) as Minister Choiseul
- Madness (1919) as Jörges
- Seine Beichte (Bekenntnisse eines Lebemannes) (1919) as Achim von Wellinghausen
- During My Apprenticeship (1919) as Axel von Rambow
- Unheimliche Geschichten (1919) as Der Teufel (framing story) / Former husband (ep.1) / Murderer (ep,2) / Drunk (ep.3) / Artur Silas, detective (ep.4) / Travelling Baron (ep.5)
- Lilli's Marriage (1919) as Dr. Goldmann
- Lilli (1919) as Dr. Goldmann
- Die schwarze Marion (1919)
- The Duty to Live (1919)
- The Devil and the Madonna (1919)
- Was Den Männern Gefällt (1919)
- Love (1919) as Herbert Warfield
- Fieber (1919)
- Was den Männern gefällt (1919)
- The Rose of the Flyer (1919)
- The Loves of Käthe Keller (1919) as Erbprinz Ottokar
- The Girl and the Men (1919)
- The Secret of the American Docks (1919) as Corbett, Reisender
- Baccarat (1919)
- The Count of Cagliostro (1920) as Cagliostro
- Figures of the Night (1920) as Sekretär
- Dancer of Death (1920)
- Mary Magdalene (1920, director) as Leonhard
- The Dancer Barberina (1920) as Prinz von Carignan
- The Girl from Acker Street (1920, director)
- The Prisoner (1920) as Französischer Lagerkommandant
- Three Nights (1920) as Verbrecher
- The Bandits of Asnières (1920) as Jean, der Apache
- Moriturus (1920)
- Catherine the Great (1920, director) as Tsar Peter
- The Chameleon (1920)
- Christian Wahnschaffe (1920)
- The Anti-Detective (1920)
- The Last Hour (1921)
- The Story of a Maid (1921)
- Deceiver of the People (1921, director)
- Lady Hamilton (1921) as Ferdinand IV, König von Neapel
- Money in the Streets (1922) as Harry Lister
- Luise Millerin (1922) as Hofmarschall Kalb
- Bigamy (1922) as Alexandroff
- The Love Nest (1922) as Lothar von Brandt
- The Three Marys (1923) as Don Juan de la Marana
- The Treasure of Gesine Jacobsen (1923) as Rasmussen
- The Misanthrope (1923)
- Adam and Eve (1923) as Schieber
- The Slipper Hero (1923)
- The New Land (1924)
- Strong Winds (1924, director)
- Battle of the Butterflies (1924) as Richard Keßler, Reisender
- A Woman for 24 Hours (1925, director)
- Rags and Silk (1925) as Max
- The Marriage Swindler (1925)
- Flight Around the World (1925) as Louis Renard
- The Flower Girl of Potsdam Square (1925) as Stiefelputzer
- Der Flug um den Erdball, 2. Teil - Indien, Europa (1925)
- The Salesgirl from the Fashion Store (1925)
- Cock of the Roost (1925) as Peter Abendrot
- Den of Iniquity (1925) as Emil Stiebel
- Zwischen zwei Frauen (1925)
- The Pride of the Company (1926) as Wilhelm, der Stolz der Kompagnie
- Tea Time in the Ackerstrasse (1926)
- Circus Romanelli (1926) as Der dumme August
- We'll Meet Again in the Heimat (1926) as Gustav Knospe
- The Imaginary Baron (1927) as Der Juxbaron
- Hello Caesar! (1927) as Caesar, Artist
- Heaven on Earth (1927) as Traugott Bellmann
- Always Be True and Faithful (1927) as Orje Duff
- Gesetze der Liebe (1927)
- Herkules Maier (1928) as Stadtreisender Herkules Maier
- Don Juan in a Girls' School (1928, director) as Dr. Eckehart Bleibtreu
- Adam and Eve (1928) as Adam Grünau
- You Walk So Softly (1928, director) as Gustav Mond
- From a Bachelor's Diary (1929) as Franz
- Peter the Mariner (1929) as Peter Sturz
- Column X (1929) as Robert Sandt, Führer der Kolonne X
- Love in the Ring (1930) (uncredited)
- Phantoms of Happiness (1930, director)
- 1914 (1931) as Czar Nicholas II
- Ronny (1931, director) (German-language version)
- Ronny (1931, director) (French-language version)
- The Little Escapade (1931, director)
- The Threepenny Opera (1931) as Tiger Brown
- Her Grace Commands (1931) as Staatsminister Graf Herlitz
- Le Bal (1931) as Alfred Kampf (French-language version)
- Der Ball (1931) as Alfred Kampf (German-language version)
- How Shall I Tell My Husband? (1932, director)
- Le petit écart (1932, director)
- The Beautiful Adventure (1932, director)
- The Beautiful Adventure (1932, director)
- Victor and Victoria (1933, writer and director)
- Season in Cairo (1933, director)
- Idylle au Caire (1933, director)
- The English Marriage (1934, director)
- George and Georgette (1934, director)
- Die Töchter ihrer Exzellenz (1934, director)
- La jeune fille d'une nuit (1934, director)
- Amphitryon (1935, writer and director)
- Les dieux s'amusent (1935, director)
- The Girl Irene (1936, director)
- Donogoo Tonka (1936, director)
- Donogoo (1936, director)
- Land of Love (1937, director)
- Die Stimme Reichstag's (1949) as himself

=== American films ===
- Rich Man, Poor Girl (1938, director)
- The Ice Follies of 1939 (1939, director)
- Balalaika (1939, director)
- The Great Awakening (1941, director)
- Hangmen Also Die! (1943) as Gestapo Insp. Ritter
- First Comes Courage (1943) as Col. Kurt von Elser
- Hostages (1943) as Kurt Daluege
- The Hitler Gang (1944) as Gen. Ludendorff
- The Man in Half Moon Street (1945) as Dr. Kurt van Bruecken
- Dragonwyck (1946) as Count De Grenier (uncredited)
- Notorious (1946) as Dr. Anderson
- Plainsman and the Lady (1946) as Michael H. Arnesen
- Golden Earrings (1947) as Prof. Otto Krosigk
- Berlin Express (1948) as Walther
- The Vicious Circle (1948) as Baron Arady
- Washington Story (1952) as Peter Kralik

=== West German films ===
- The Dubarry (1951, director)
- Meines Vaters Pferde I. Teil Lena und Nicoline (1954) as Konsul Rittinghaus
- Meines Vaters Pferde, 2. Teil: Seine dritte Frau (1954) as Konsul Rittinghaus
- A Love Story (1954) as Schlumberger, Schauspieldirektor (final film role)
