= Fred Goebel =

German actor

- Born: 3 April 1891; Berlin, German Empire
- Died: 16 May 1964 (aged 73); Stuttgart, West Germany
- Occupation: Actor

Fred Goebel (3 April 1891 – 16 May 1964) was a German film actor. He was born as Walter Goebel and was sometimes credited as Fred Selva-Goebel.

== Selected filmography ==
- Child on the Open Road (1919)
- The Dance of Death (1919)
- Bettler GmbH (1919)
- Monte Carlo (1921)
- Deceiver of the People (1921)
- The Woman in the Trunk (1921)
- Insulted and Humiliated (1922)
- Between Evening and Morning (1923)
- The Wig (1925)
- Lace (1926)
- 1914 (1931)
- The Captain from Köpenick (1931)
- Trenck (1932)
- Marshal Forwards (1932)
- Gretel Wins First Prize (1933)
- Count Woronzeff (1934)
- Make Me Happy (1935)
- Scandal at the Fledermaus (1936)
- Lucky Kids (1936)
- Talking About Jacqueline (1937)
- Ball at the Metropol (1937)
- When Women Keep Silent (1937)
- The Glass Ball (1937)
- Sergeant Berry (1938)
- The Impossible Mister Pitt (1938)
- Secret Code LB 17 (1938)
- Napoleon Is to Blame for Everything (1938)
- Secret Mission (1938)
- The Indian Tomb (1938)
- Twelve Minutes After Midnight (1939)
- The Governor (1939)
- In the Name of the People (1939)
- Robert and Bertram (1939)
- The Merciful Lie (1939)
- Enemies (1940)
- Counterfeiters (1940)
- Carl Peters (1941)
- Mistress Moon (1941)
- Attack on Baku (1942)
- Back Then (1943)
- A Waltz with You (1943)

== Bibliography ==
- Hardt, Ursula. From Caligari to California: Erich Pommer's Life in the International Film Wars. Berghahn Books, 1996.
- Rentschler, Eric. The Ministry of Illusion: Nazi Cinema and Its Afterlife. Harvard University Press, 1996.
