= The Peruvian =

1919 film

- Directed by: Alfred Halm
- Written by: Alfred Halm
- Produced by: Frederic Zelnik
- Starring: Mady Christians; Reinhold Schünzel; Paul Graetz
- Cinematography: Karl Wieghorst
- Production company: Berliner Film-Manufaktur
- Release date: July 1919
- Country: Germany
- Languages: Silent; German intertitles

The Peruvian (German: Die Peruanerin) is a 1919 German silent drama film directed by Alfred Halm and starring Mady Christians, Reinhold Schünzel, and Paul Graetz.

== Cast ==
- Mady Christians as Fernades Matamorer
- Reinhold Schünzel as Egon Hartenstein
- Paul Graetz as Sonnenschein - spekulant
- Josefa Gettke as Rita
- Hans Kuhnert as Maximilian von Hochberg
- Maria Lux as Juana - dienerin
- Ernst Pröckl as Elimar
- Lina Salten as Sophia Hartenstein

== Bibliography ==
- Bock, Hans-Michael & Bergfelder, Tim. The Concise CineGraph. Encyclopedia of German Cinema. Berghahn Books, 2009.
