= Hermann Vallentin =

German actor (1872–1945)

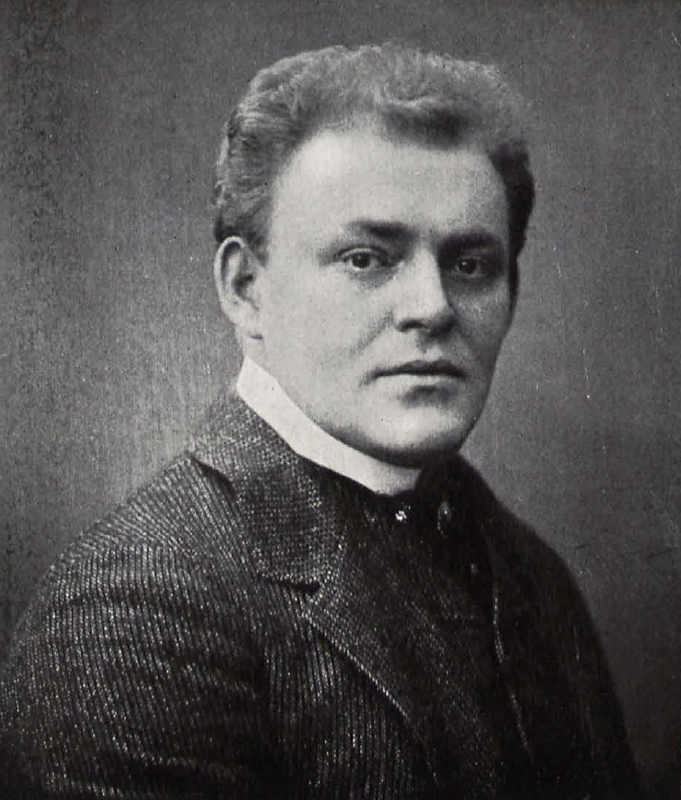
- Vallentin c. 1908
- Born: 24 May 1872; Berlin, German Empire
- Died: 18 September 1945 (aged 73); Tel Aviv, Mandatory Palestine
- Occupation: Actor
- Years active: 1895–1945
- Relatives: Rosa Valetti (sister)

Hermann Vallentin (24 May 1872 – 18 September 1945) was a German actor.

== Biography ==
Hermann Vallentin was born in Berlin in 1872. He was the son of a Jewish timber merchant and factory owner, Felix Vallentin. He was the older brother of actress Rosa Valetti. After training as an actor at the Royal Theatre in Berlin with Max Grube and Hans Oberländer, he received his first engagement at the Central-Theatre in Berlin in the 1895/96 season. In the next few years, appearances on various Berlin stages followed.

From 1914, Vallentin was also a film actor. He mostly embodied fatherly figures, patriarchs and directors, but also small-minded philistines. In the 1931 film version of Der Hauptmann von Köpenick, he played the uniform tailor Adolph Wormser.

The seizure of power by the Nazis in 1933, ended his film career abruptly. In 1933 Vallentin, emigrated to Czechoslovakia, where he appeared on German language stages in Ústí and Prague. In 1938 he left for Switzerland and worked at the Stadttheater Basel and the Schauspielhaus Zürich. In 1939 he emigrated to Mandatory Palestine and settled in Tel Aviv. Not being able to speak Hebrew, he retired from acting altogether. In Tel Aviv, he lectured, read poetry and was a sporadic anchorman for German-language news on the Palestine Broadcasting Service (PBS). He died in Tel Aviv in 1945, aged 73.

== Selected filmography ==
- The Tunnel (1915)
- Waves of Fate (1918)
- The Nun and the Harlequin (1918)
- Madeleine (1919)
- Child on the Open Road (1919)
- Charlotte Corday (1919)
- Das Fest der Rosella (1919)
- The Heiress of the Count of Monte Cristo (1919)
- The Golden Crown (1920)
- The Three Dances of Mary Wilford (1920)
- The Skull of Pharaoh's Daughter (1920)
- Christian Wahnschaffe (1920)
- The Yellow Diplomat (1920)
- The Last Kolczaks (1920)
- The Mayor of Zalamea (1920)
- Hearts are Trumps (1920)
- Judith Trachtenberg (1920)
- Das Haupt des Juarez (1920)
- The Black Count (1920)
- The Haunted Castle (1921)
- Destiny (1921)
- Murder Without Cause (1921)
- The Railway King (1921)
- The Rats (1921)
- The Red Masquerade Ball (1921)
- The Black Panther (1921)
- Marie Antoinette, the Love of a King (1922)
- The Queen of Whitechapel (1922)
- Your Bad Reputation (1922)
- The Man of Steel (1922)
- The Marriage of Princess Demidoff (1922)
- Hanneles Himmelfahrt (1922)
- The Ancient Law (1923)
- Friedrich Schiller (1923)
- Count Cohn (1923)
- The Love of a Queen (1923)
- William Tell (1923)
- The Grand Duke's Finances (1924)
- Das Haus am Meer (1924)
- Darling of the King (1924)
- The Heart of Lilian Thorland (1924)
- The Last Laugh (1924)
- The Dice Game of Life (1925)
- The Doll of Luna Park (1925)
- The Director General (1925)
- In the Name of the Kaisers (1925)
- Three Cuckoo Clocks (1926)
- The Fallen (1926)
- The Flight in the Night (1926)
- Torments of the Night (1926)
- Madame Wants No Children (1926)
- Out of the Mist (1927)
- The Strange Case of Captain Ramper (1927)
- The Awakening of Woman (1927)
- The Trial of Donald Westhof (1927)
- Luther (1928)
- Spies (1928)
- The Story of a Little Parisian (1928)
- Lotte (1928)
- The Last Performance of the Circus Wolfson (1928)
- The Schorrsiegel Affair (1928)
- Asphalt (1929)
- Woman in the Moon (1929)
- The Unusual Past of Thea Carter (1929)
- Atlantik (1929)
- Cyanide (1930)
- Bookkeeper Kremke (1930)
- Him or Me (1930)
- Two Worlds (1930)
- The Stolen Face (1930)
- Helene Willfüer, Student of Chemistry (1930)
- Wibbel the Tailor (1931)
- My Wife, the Impostor (1931)
- Alarm at Midnight (1931)
- The Captain from Köpenick (1931)
- I'll Stay with You (1931)
- Storms of Passion (1932)
- When Love Sets the Fashion (1932)
- Jumping Into the Abyss (1933)

== Bibliography ==
- Eisner, Lotte H. The Haunted Screen: Expressionism in the German Cinema and the Influence of Max Reinhardt. University of California Press, 2008.
