= Magnus Stifter =

Austrian actor

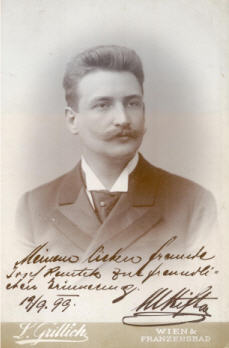
- Born: 23 January 1878; Vienna, Austria-Hungary (now Austria)
- Died: 8 September 1943 (aged 65); Vienna, Nazi Germany (now Austria)
- Occupation: Actor
- Years active: 1898–1941

Magnus Stifter (23 January 1878 – 8 September 1943) was an Austrian stage and film actor. He appeared in 85 films between 1914 and 1941. He was born in Vienna, Austria-Hungary (now Austria), and died in Vienna, Nazi Germany (now Austria).

== Selected filmography ==
- The ABC of Love (1916)
- Your Dearest Enemy (1916)
- When the Heart Burns with Hate (1917)
- Carmen (1918)
- Between Two Worlds (1919)
- The Woman at the Crossroads (1919)
- State Attorney Jordan (1919)
- Out of the Depths (1919)
- Prince Cuckoo (1919)
- Veritas Vincit (1919)
- The Duty to Live (1919)
- The Devil and the Madonna (1919)
- Countess Walewska (1920)
- Der Januskopf (1920)
- Die Frau im Delphin (1920)
- The Lady in Black (1920)
- The Conspiracy in Genoa (1921)
- At War in the Diamond Fields (1921)
- The Handicap of Love (1921)
- The Bull of Olivera (1921)
- Ash Wednesday (1921)
- The Secret of the Mummy (1921)
- The Adventuress of Monte Carlo (1921)
- The Earl of Essex (1922)
- Der brennende Acker (1922)
- Othello (1922)
- The Man of Steel (1922)
- The Queen of Whitechapel (1922)
- Yvette, the Fashion Princess (1922)
- Irene of Gold (1923)
- Mister Radio (1924)
- Orient (1924)
- Spring Awakening (1924)
- Za La Mort (1924)
- Nelly, the Bride Without a Husband (1924)
- Wallenstein (1925)
- Nameless Woman (1927)
- The Story of a Little Parisian (1928)
- Fair Game (1928)
- Tales from the Vienna Woods (1928)
- Napoleon at Saint Helena (1929)
- Roses Bloom on the Moorland (1929)
- Misled Youth (1929)
- Latin Quarter (1929)
- The Case of Colonel Redl (1931)
- Elisabeth of Austria (1931)
- Rasputin, Demon with Women (1932)
- Maria Ilona (1939)
- Friedemann Bach (1941)
