= The Loves of Käthe Keller =

1919 German film by Carl Froelich

- Directed by: Carl Froelich
- Written by: Carl Froelich; Richard Skowronnek (novel); Paul Tatzeit
- Starring: Irmgard Bern; Paul Hartmann; Reinhold Schünzel
- Cinematography: Otto Tober
- Production company: Maxim-Film
- Release date: 12 September 1919
- Country: Germany
- Languages: Silent; German intertitles

The Loves of Käthe Keller (German: Die Liebschaften der Kaethe Keller) is a 1919 German silent drama film directed by Carl Froelich and starring Irmgard Bern, Paul Hartmann and Reinhold Schünzel.

The film's sets were designed by the art director Hans Sohnle.

== Cast ==
- Irmgard Bern as Käthe Keller
- Paul Hartmann as Franz Petrow
- Reinhold Schünzel as Erbprinz Ottokar
- Adolf Klein as Forstmeister Petrow,
- Margarete Kupfer as Frau Keller, Kätes Mutter
- Leopold von Ledebur as Fürst Isensee
- Paul Kaufmann
- Oskar Marion
- Margarete Schön
