= The Devil and the Madonna =

- Directed by: Carl Boese
- Written by: Hans Brennert; Friedel Köhne
- Starring: Gertrude Welcker; Magnus Stifter; Reinhold Schünzel
- Production company: Firmament-Film
- Release date: November 1919
- Country: Germany
- Languages: Silent; German intertitles

The Devil and the Madonna (German: Der Teufel und die Madonna) is a 1919 German silent drama film directed by Carl Boese and starring Gertrude Welcker, Magnus Stifter and Reinhold Schünzel.

The film's sets were designed by the art director Hans Dreier.

== Cast ==
- Magnus Stifter as Doktor Canzarro / Teufel
- Gertrude Welcker as Tochter Gesina Tradler
- Ernst Pittschau as Graf Jervis
- Emil Rameau as Meister Tradler
- Reinhold Schünzel

== Bibliography ==
- Bock, Hans-Michael & Bergfelder, Tim. The Concise CineGraph. Encyclopedia of German Cinema. Berghahn Books, 2009.
