= The Secret of the American Docks =

1919 film by Ewald André Dupont

- German: Das Geheimnis des Amerika-Docks
- Directed by: Ewald André Dupont
- Written by: Ewald André Dupont
- Starring: Max Landa; Gustav Botz; Reinhold Schünzel
- Cinematography: Charles Paulus
- Production company: Stern-Film
- Release date: 14 March 1919
- Country: Germany
- Languages: Silent; German intertitles

The Secret of the American Docks (German: Das Geheimnis des Amerika-Docks) is a 1919 German silent mystery film directed by Ewald André Dupont and starring Max Landa, Gustav Botz, and Reinhold Schünzel.

The film's sets were designed by the art director Robert A. Dietrich.

== Cast ==
- Max Landa as detective
- Gustav Botz as James Mistoll
- Reinhold Schünzel as Corbett, adventurer
- Carl Grünwald as Robert Hatt, Owner of the firm Hatt & Mistoll
- Leonhard Haskel as old patch cobber
- Ria Jende as Vera
- Max Laurence as C. Dale, independent scholar
- Rose Lichtenstein as Gertie Mistoll
- Albert Paul as Dr. Vaneel, alienist
- Karl Platen as Williams, factory worker
- Fritz Schulz as Barnes, detective's assistant
- Fritz Sterler as Clarence Mistoll
- Helene Voß as Lieschen, detective's economist
- Max Zilzer as Sparkes, accountant
