= Robert A. Dietrich =

German art director (1889–1947)

- Born: 28 March 1889; Berlin, German Empire
- Died: 8 September 1947 (aged 58); Berlin, Germany
- Occupation: Art director
- Years active: 1911-1946 (film)

Robert A. Dietrich (28 March 1889 – 8 September 1947) was a German art director. He designed the sets for more than a hundred films during his career.

== Selected filmography ==
- The Student of Prague (1913)
- The Path of Death (1917)
- When the Dead Speak (1917)
- The Spies (1919)
- The Secret of the American Docks (1919)
- The Derby (1919)
- World by the Throat (1920)
- The Woman Without a Soul (1920)
- Va banque (1920)
- Hearts are Trumps (1920)
- Nights of Terror (1921)
- Christian Wahnschaffe (1921)
- Murder Without Cause (1921)
- The Nights of Cornelis Brouwer (1921)
- To the Ladies' Paradise (1922)
- Black Monday (1922)
- At the Edge of the Great City (1922)
- Doctor Wislizenus (1924)
- Playing with Destiny (1924)
- Debit and Credit (1924)
- Wallenstein (1925)
- Neptune Bewitched (1925)
- What the Stones Tell (1925)
- A Free People (1925)
- Three Waiting Maids (1925)
- Anne-Liese of Dessau (1925)
- Father Voss (1925)
- Hussar Fever (1925)
- Trude (1926)
- Women of Passion (1926)
- Lives in Danger (1926)
- The Woman's Crusade (1926)
- Excluded from the Public (1927)
- The Standard-Bearer of Sedan (1927)
- The Man with the Counterfeit Money (1927)
- The Woman with the World Record (1927)
- The Case of Prosecutor M (1928)
- Today I Was With Frieda (1928)
- Lux, King of Criminals (1929)
- The Girl from the Provinces (1929)
- The Gypsy Chief (1929)
- The Third Confession (1929)
- Big City Children (1929)
- Marriage in Name Only (1930)
- Shadows of the Underworld (1931)
- The Theft of the Mona Lisa (1931)
- The Other Side (1931)
- Student Life in Merry Springtime (1931)
- Two Good Comrades (1933)
- The Big Chance (1934)
- The Champion of Pontresina (1934)
- The Riders of German East Africa (1934)
- Between Two Hearts (1934)
- Bashful Felix (1934)
- The Four Musketeers (1934)
- Frisians in Peril (1935)
- Miracle of Flight (1935)
- The Coral Princess (1937)
- Meiseken (1937)
- Fools in the Snow (1938)
- The Night of Decision (1938)
- Linen from Ireland (1939)
- Stars of Variety (1939)
- Mistake of the Heart (1939)
- Six Days of Leave (1941)
- Jakko (1941)
- What Does Brigitte Want? (1941)
- The Impostor (1944)

== Bibliography ==
- Dietrich Scheunemann. Expressionist Film: New Perspectives. Camden House, 2006.
