= E. A. Dupont =

German film director (1891–1956)

Ewald André Dupont
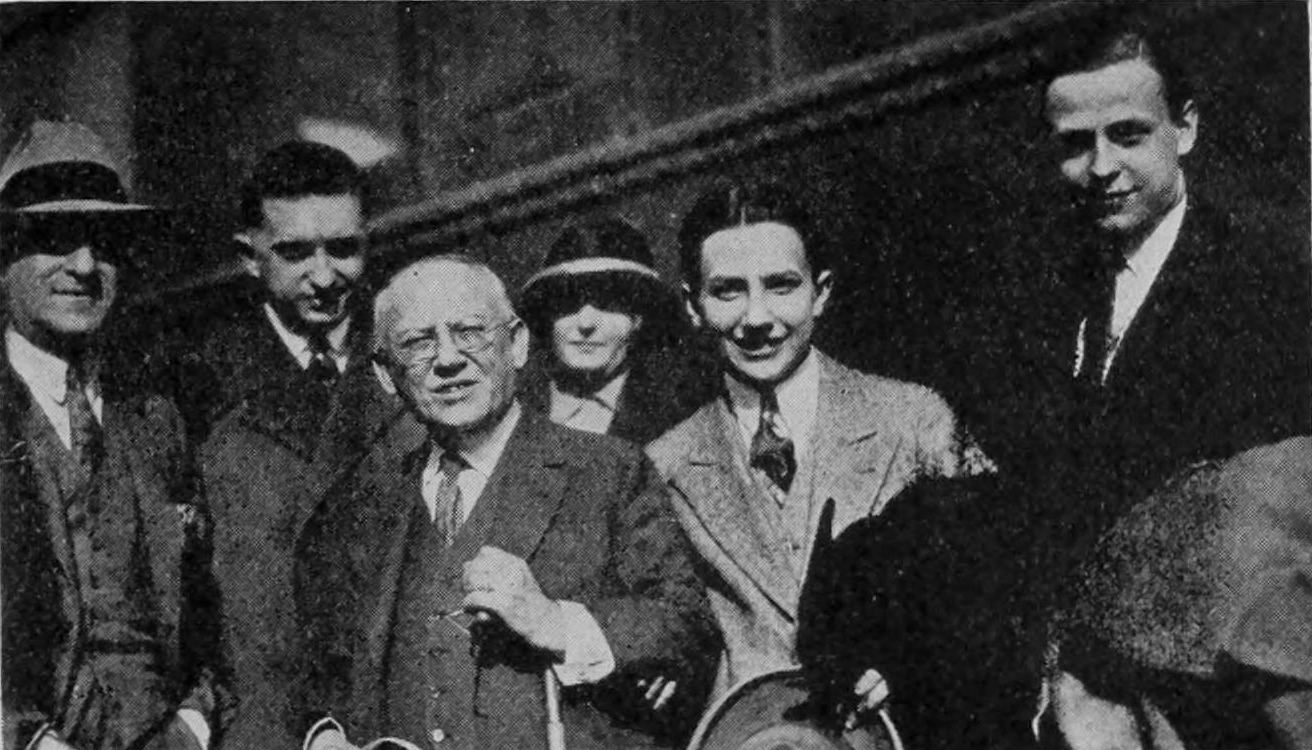
- Second from left in 1926 group greeting Carl Laemmle in Los Angeles
- Born: 25 December 1891; Zeitz, Province of Saxony; German Empire
- Died: 12 December 1956 (aged 64); Hollywood, California; United States
- Other name: E. A. Dupont
- Occupations: Film director Screenwriter
- Years active: 1916–1956

Ewald André Dupont (25 December 1891 – 12 December 1956) was a German film director, one of the pioneers of the German film industry. He was often credited as E. A. Dupont.

== Early life and career ==
Born in Zeitz, Saxony and raised in Berlin, DuPont was the son of journalists Hedwig Friedlander and Hermann DuPont, then-editor of Berliner Illustrirte Zeitung. After briefly attending the University of Berlin, DuPont began work in 1911 as a reporter, columnist, and, eventually, editor of the Berliner Allgemeinen Zeitung.

A newspaper columnist in 1916, Dupont became a screenwriter and began directing his own crime-story scripts in 1918. After several successes in his native Germany in silent films, he worked in London and in Hollywood, California. One of his greatest successes was the silent film Varieté (1925). This film, about an ex-trapeze artist, was noted for its innovative camerawork with highly expressive movement through space, accomplished by the expressionist cinematographer Karl Freund. Varieté even did well in the United States, screening for 12 weeks at New York's Rialto Theatre.

== United States ==
Dupont's success was noticed by Carl Laemmle at Universal, who offered Dupont a lucrative contract. His first project was Love Me and the World Is Mine in the early summer of 1926, which ran well over budget ($350,000) and was not a success.

== Britain ==
Dupont then headed to Britain and made the film Piccadilly (1929), a late silent, which is remembered for the central performance of the Chinese-American actress Anna May Wong. Atlantic (also 1929) is a retelling of the Titanic disaster and is seen as one of the most innovative uses of sound film technology available at the time. Dupont made several more films in Britain including Cape Forlorn which was also filmed with a German cast starring Conrad Veidt and Tala Birell and released as Menschen im Käfig. Whilst working for British International Pictues, Dupont introduced the talents of still photographer Fred Daniels to the Publicity Department at Elstree Studios and for the first time photography was taken seriously as a way to promote British films in Germany, Poland and America.

== Later career ==
After a brief return to Germany, the Jewish director emigrated to the United States in 1933, where he was assigned to several B movies and low budget "programmer" films. Unhappy with the lack of opportunities afforded him in Hollywood, Dupont became a talent agent in 1940.

Dupont returned to filmmaking when he wrote and directed The Scarf (1951). In 1952 and 1953, he wrote 23 episodes for the TV series Big Town (1950–56) and directed two of those episodes, "Tape Recorder" (19 June 1952) and "The Story of Jerry Baxter" (1 January 1953). Dupont directed several more low-budget films, such as The Neanderthal Man (1953).

== Selected filmography ==
=== Director ===
- Europe, General Delivery (1918)
- Midnight (1918)
- The Devil (1918)
- The Japanese Woman (1919)
- The Secret of the American Docks (1919)
- The Mask (1919)
- The Spies (1919)
- The Apache of Marseilles (1919)
- The Derby (1919)
- Alkohol (co-director: Alfred Lind, 1919)
- World by the Throat (1920)
- The Grand Babylon Hotel (1920)
- The White Peacock (1920)
- Whitechapel (1920)
- Hearts are Trumps (1920)
- Murder Without Cause (1921)
- Children of Darkness (1921)
- The Vulture Wally (1921)
- Kinder der Finsternis (1921)
- She and the Three (1922)
- The Green Manuela (1923)
- The Ancient Law (1923)
- The Humble Man and the Chanteuse (1925)
- Variety (1925)
- Love Me and the World Is Mine (1927)
- Moulin Rouge (1928)
- Piccadilly (1929)
- Atlantic (English-language film, 1929)
  - Atlantik (German-language film, 1929)
  - Atlantis (French-language film, 1930)
- Two Worlds (English-language film, 1930)
  - Two Worlds (German-language film, 1930)
  - Les deux mondes (French-language film, 1930)
- Menschen im Käfig (German-language film, 1930)
  - Le cap perdu (French-language film, 1931)
  - Cape Forlorn (English-language film, 1931)
- Salto Mortale (French-language film, 1931)
  - Salto Mortale (German-language film, 1931)
- Peter Voss, Thief of Millions (1932)
- The Marathon Runner (1933)
- Ladies Must Love (1933)
- The Bishop Misbehaves (1935)
- Forgotten Faces (1936)
- A Son Comes Home (1936)
- Night of Mystery (1937)
- On Such a Night (1937)
- Love on Toast (1937)
- Hell's Kitchen (1939)
- The Scarf (1951)
- Pictura: An Adventure in Art (1951, co-director)
- Problem Girls (1953)
- The Neanderthal Man (1953)
- The Steel Lady (1953)
- Return to Treasure Island (1954)

=== Screenwriter ===
- Vengeance Is Mine (dir. Rudolf Meinert, 1916)
- The Onyx Head (dir. Joe May, 1917)
- Let There Be Light (dir. Richard Oswald, 1917)
- Ferdinand Lassalle (dir. Rudolf Meinert, 1918)
- His Majesty the Hypochondriac (dir. Frederic Zelnik, 1918)
- Alkohol (dir. Alfred Lind, 1919)
- Patience (dir. Felix Basch and Paul Leni, 1920)
- Madame Pompadour (dir. Herbert Wilcox, 1927)
- Magic Fire (dir. William Dieterle, 1955)
- Please Murder Me (dir. Peter Godfrey, 1956)
