= Alfred von Ingelheim's Dramatic Life =

1921 film

- Directed by: Erik Lund
- Written by: Hans Land (novel); Georg Kaiser
- Cinematography: Curt Courant
- Distributed by: Ring-Film
- Release date: 15 February 1921
- Country: Germany
- Languages: Silent; German intertitles

Alfred von Ingelheim's Dramatic Life (German: Alfred von Ingelheims Lebensdrama) is a 1921 German silent film directed by Erik Lund and starring Bruno Kastner, Maria Zelenka and Hanni Weisse.

The film's art direction was by Siegfried Wroblewsky.

== Cast ==
- Bruno Kastner as Alfred von Ingelheim
- Maria Zelenka as Backfisch
- Hanni Weisse as Hofdame
- Leopold von Ledebur as König
- Vera Lessing
- Frida Richard
- Fritz Richard
- Ernst Rückert

== Bibliography ==
- Bock, Hans-Michael; Bergfelder, Tim, eds. (2009). The Concise Cinegraph: Encyclopaedia of German Cinema. New York: Berghahn Books. ISBN 978-1-57181-655-9.
