= Georg Kaiser =

German dramatist (1878–1945)

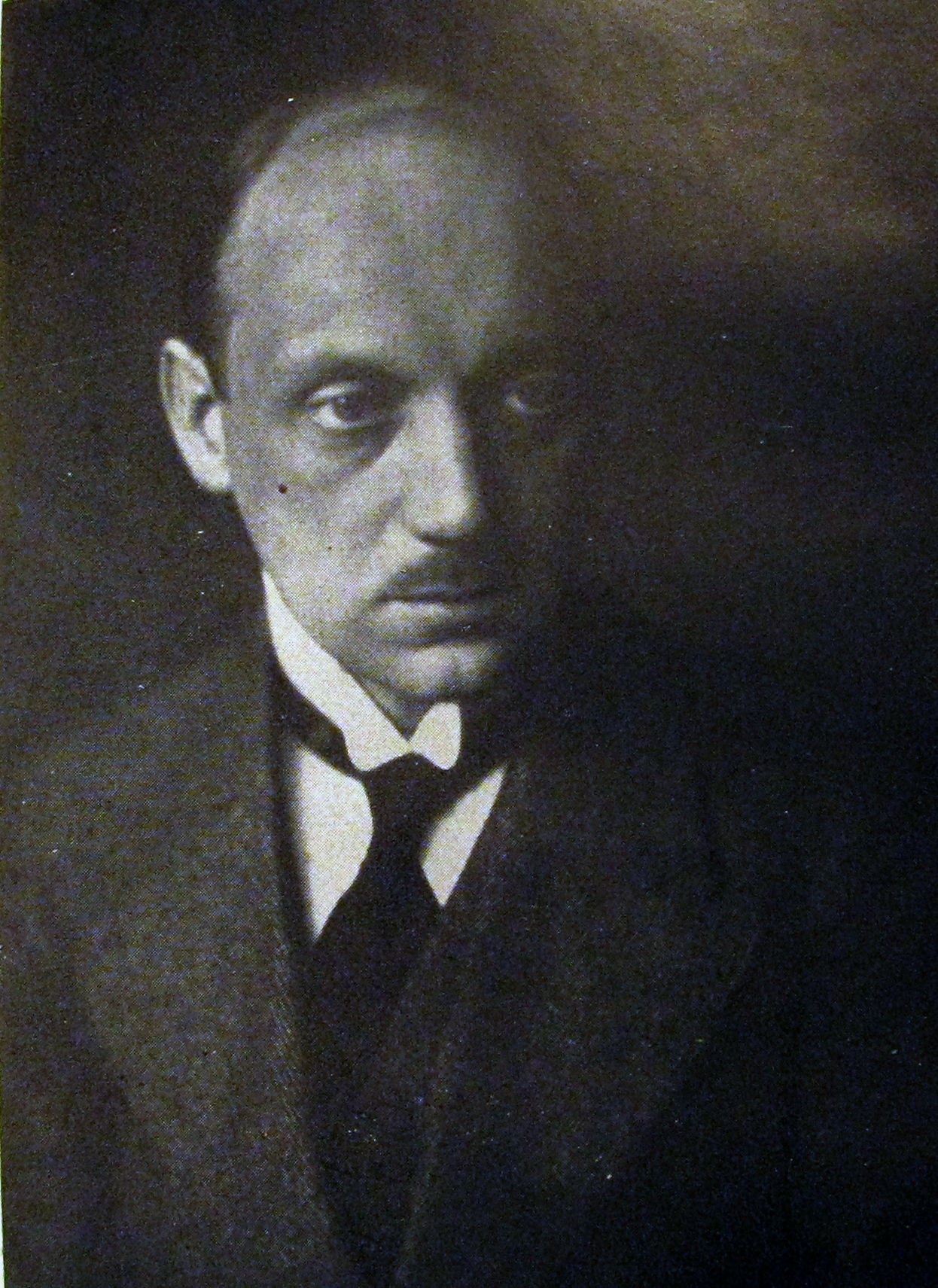
Georg Kaiser

Friedrich Carl Georg Kaiser, called Georg Kaiser, (25 November 1878 – 4 June 1945) was a German dramatist.

== Biography ==
Kaiser was born in Magdeburg.

He was highly prolific and wrote in a number of different styles. An Expressionist dramatist, he was, along with Gerhart Hauptmann, the most frequently performed playwright of the Weimar Republic. Georg Kaiser's plays include The Burghers of Calais (1913), From Morning to Midnight (1912), and a trilogy, comprising The Coral (1917), Gas (1918), Gas II (1920).

He died in Ascona, Switzerland, and was buried in Morcote near Lugano.

== Work ==
The Burghers of Calais (Die Bürger von Calais), written in 1913, was not performed until 1917. It was Kaiser's first success. The play is very dense linguistically, with its dialogue comprising numerous emotive monologues influenced by the Telegramstil poetics of August Stramm. Like Kaiser's other works of the period, it bears the mark of Friedrich Nietzsche's philosophy, calling upon the modern individual to transcend mediocrity through extraordinary actions; the Expressionist 'New Man' became a commonplace of the genre.

From Morn to Midnight, filmed by Karlheinz Martin in 1920, was written in 1912 and first performed in 1917. One of the most frequently performed works of German Expressionist theatre, its plot concerns a Cashier (played by Ernst Deutsch in Martin's film) in a small bank in W. (ostensibly Weimar) who is alerted to the power of money by the visit of a rich Italian lady. He embezzles 60,000 Marks and absconds to B. (Berlin) where he attempts to find transcendent experiences in sport, romance and religion, only to be ultimately frustrated.

Kaiser's classic Expressionist plays, written just before and during World War I, often called for man to make a decisive break with the past, rejuvenating contemporary society. He eschewed characterization, and particularly character psychology, instead making his protagonists and other characters archetypes, employing highly anti-naturalistic dialogue often comprising lengthy individual speeches.

Kaiser's drama Side by Side (Nebeneinander, 1923), a 'people's play' (Volksstück), premiered in Berlin on 3 November 1923, directed by Berthold Viertel with design by George Grosz. With this play Kaiser moved away from the Expressionism of his previous works. Utilizing a more rounded characterization and more realistic curt, comic dialogue to tell a light-hearted story of an idealistic pawnbroker caught up in the hyperinflation afflicting Germany at the time (the currency stabilization came a fortnight after the play opened), the play inaugurated the 'new sobriety' (Neue Sachlichkeit) in the drama. "Kaiser has left the cloud that used to surround him," a review in the Weltbühne suggested, "and landed with both feet on the earth."

Kaiser's plays, particularly From Morning to Midnight, were highly influential on the German dramatists operating during the 1920s, including Yvan Goll, Ernst Toller and Bertolt Brecht, who drew on Kaiser's use of revue-type scenes and parable, which was influenced by medieval and 16th-century German mystery plays.

Kaiser collaborated with the composer Kurt Weill on his one-act operas Der Protagonist (1926), Der Zar lässt sich photographieren (1928), and Der Silbersee (1933).

In his later years, he further developed his criticism of the modern machine age that had characterised the Gas trilogy. Imprisoned briefly in 1923 for stealing a loaf of bread during the hyper-inflationary crisis, Kaiser fled to Switzerland when the Nazis came to power in the 1930s (Kaiser went into exile in 1938). There he turned to writing verse dramas on mythological themes, including Pygmalion, Amphitryon, and Bellerophon, and a pacifist drama, The Soldier Tanaka (1940).

The Raft of the Medusa (1945) is a play written in verse that reverses the ethos of The Burghers of Calais in a more pessimistic direction; to avoid bad luck, thirteen children on a life-raft drown the youngest of them. (See the frigate Méduse for the historical shipwreck and The Raft of the Medusa for its famous depiction in art.)

== Plays ==
- 1912: Von Morgens bis Mitternachts (From Morning to Midnight, written; first performed 1917)
- 1914: Die Bürger von Calais (The Burghers of Calais)
- 1917: Die Koralle
- 1918: Gas I
- 1920: Gas II
- 1923: Gilles und Johanna
- 1928: Oktobertag
- 1938: Die Gärtner von Toulouse
- 1940: Alain und Elise

== Selected filmography ==
=== Film adaptations ===
- From Morn to Midnight (dir. Karlheinz Martin, 1920) – based on the play From Morning to Midnight
- Women's Sacrifice (dir. Karl Grune, 1922) – based on the play Das Frauenopfer
- The Farmer from Texas (dir. Joe May, 1925) – based on the play Kolportage
- Hurrah! I Live! (dir. Wilhelm Thiele, 1928) – based on the play Der mutige Seefahrer
- Zwei Krawatten (dir. Felix Basch, 1930) – based on the play Zwei Krawatten
- The Valiant Navigator (dir. Hans Deppe, 1935) – based on the play Der mutige Seefahrer
- The Ghost Comes Home (dir. Wilhelm Thiele, USA, 1940) – based on the play Der mutige Seefahrer
- Die Frau am Weg (dir. Eduard von Borsody, 1948) – based on the story Der Flüchtling
- Kolportage (dir. Hans Lietzau, 1957, TV film) – based on the play Kolportage
- Napoleon in New Orleans (dir. Imo Moszkowicz, 1959, TV film) – based on the play Napoleon in New Orleans
- Papiermühle (dir. Hans Dieter Schwarze, 1962, TV film) – based on the play Papiermühle
- Kolportage (dir. Hans Jaray, Erich Neuberg, 1964, TV film) – based on the play Kolportage
- Der Gärtner von Toulouse (dir. Falk Harnack, 1965, TV film) – based on the play Der Gärtner von Toulouse
- Kolportage (dir. Wilhelm Semmelroth, 1968, TV film) – based on the play Kolportage
- Kolportage (dir. Peter Weck, 1980, TV film) – based on the play Kolportage

=== Screenwriter ===
- Devoted Artists (dir. Erik Lund, 1919)
- Prince Cuckoo (dir. Paul Leni, 1919) – based on the novel Prinz Kuckuck by Otto Julius Bierbaum
- The Golden Lie (dir. Erik Lund, 1919)
- Alfred von Ingelheim's Dramatic Life (dir. Erik Lund, 1921) – based on the novel Alfred von Ingelheims Lebensdrama by Hans Land
- The Conspiracy in Genoa (dir. Paul Leni, 1921) – based on the play Fiesco by Friedrich Schiller

== Notes ==
=== Sources ===
- Banham, Martin, ed. (1995). "Kaiser, Georg". The Cambridge Guide to Theatre. Cambridge: Cambridge University Press. p. 585. ISBN 978-0-521-43437-9 – via Internet Archive.
- Willett, John (1996) [1978]. Art and Politics in the Weimar Period: The New Sobriety 1917–1933. New York: Da Capo Press. ISBN 978-0-306-80724-4.
