= State Attorney Jordan =

State Attorney Jordan (German:Staatsanwalt Jordan) may refer to:

- State Attorney Jordan (1919 film), a German silent film
- State Attorney Jordan (1926 film), a German silent film
