= President Barrada =

1920 film

- Directed by: Erik Lund; Joseph Delmont
- Written by: Otto Krack
- Produced by: Michael Bohnen
- Cinematography: Curt Courant
- Production company: Bohnen-Film
- Distributed by: Ring-Film
- Release date: 6 December 1920
- Country: Germany
- Languages: Silent; German intertitles

President Barrada (German: Präsident Barrada) is a 1920 German silent film directed by Erik Lund and Joseph Delmont.

The film's art direction was by Siegfried Wroblewsky.

== Cast ==
In alphabetical order

- Hermann Bachmann
- Carl Bayer
- Michael Bohnen
- Alexander Delbosq
- Wilhelm Diegelmann
- Carl Geppert
- Max Gülstorff
- Leopoldine Konstantin
- Raoul Lange
- Magda Madeleine
- Beni Montano
- Hedwig Pauly-Winterstein
- Hermann Picha
- Karl Platen
- Paul Rehkopf
- Ferdinand Robert
- Arthur Schetter
- Eduard von Winterstein
- Max Wogritsch

== Bibliography ==
- Hans-Michael Bock and Tim Bergfelder. The Concise Cinegraph: An Encyclopedia of German Cinema. Berghahn Books.
