= All Souls (film) =

1919 film

- Directed by: Erik Lund
- Written by: Karl Holck
- Produced by: Erik Lund
- Cinematography: Curt Courant
- Distributed by: Ring-Film
- Release date: 1919
- Country: Germany
- Languages: Silent; German intertitles

All Souls (German: Allerseelen) is a 1919 German silent film directed by Erik Lund.

== Cast ==
- Esther Hagan
- Bruno Kastner
- Karl Platen
- Käthe Roeven
- Toni Tetzlaff
- Leopold von Ledebur

== Bibliography ==
- Bock, Hans-Michael; Bergfelder, Tim, eds. (2009). The Concise Cinegraph: Encyclopaedia of German Cinema. New York: Berghahn Books. ISBN 978-1-57181-655-9.
