= The Bodega of Los Cuerros =

1919 film by Erik Lund

- Directed by: Erik Lund
- Written by: Ruth Goetz
- Produced by: Erik Lund
- Cinematography: Curt Courant
- Distributed by: Ring-Film
- Release date: 2 August 1919
- Country: Germany
- Languages: Silent; German intertitles

The Bodega of Los Cuerros (German: Die Bodega von Los Cuerros) is a 1919 German silent film directed by Erik Lund.

== Cast ==
In alphabetical order

- Paul Biensfeldt
- Margarete Ferida
- Ria Jende
- Bruno Kastner
- Rose Lichtenstein
- Hermann Picha
- Karl Platen
- Leopold von Ledebur

== Bibliography ==
- Bock, Hans-Michael; Bergfelder, Tim, eds. (2009). The Concise Cinegraph: Encyclopaedia of German Cinema. New York: Berghahn Books. ISBN 978-1-57181-655-9.
