= The Woman One Longs For =

1929 film

- Marlene Dietrich in a scene from the film.
- Directed by: Curtis Bernhardt
- Written by: Max Brod; Ladislaus Vajda
- Produced by: Hermann Grund
- Starring: Marlene Dietrich; Fritz Kortner; Frida Richard; Oskar Sima
- Cinematography: Curt Courant; Hans Scheib
- Music by: Giuseppe Becce; Edward Kilenyi
- Production company: Terra Film
- Distributed by: Terra Film
- Release date: 29 April 1929
- Running time: 76 minutes
- Country: Germany
- Languages: Silent; German intertitles

The Woman One Longs For (1929)

The Woman One Longs For (German: Die Frau, nach der man sich sehnt) is a 1929 German silent drama film directed by Curtis Bernhardt and starring Marlene Dietrich, Fritz Kortner and Frida Richard. It was based on the novel of the same title by Max Brod, published in Vienna by Paul Zsolnay Verlag in 1927. Made partly at the Babelsberg Studios and the Terra Studios, the film premiered on 29 April 1929 at the Mozartsaal in Berlin. The film's art direction was by Robert Neppach. It is also known by the alternative title The Three Lovers.

The film was originally silent with a scored orchestra accompaniment by Giuseppe Becce. In 1931 a synchronised soundtrack was added with music by Edward Kilenyi.

== Cast ==
- Marlene Dietrich as Stascha
- Fritz Kortner as Dr. Karoff
- Frida Richard as Mme. Leblanc
- Oskar Sima as Charles Leblanc
- Uno Henning as Henry Leblanc
- Karl Etlinger as Poitrier
- Bruno Ziener as Diener
- Edith Edwards as Angela Poitrier

== Bibliography ==
- Bach, Steven. Marlene Dietrich: Life and Legend. University of Minnesota Press, 2011.
- Kreimeier, Klaus. The Ufa Story: A History of Germany's Greatest Film Company, 1918-1945. University of California Press, 1999.
- Spoto, Donald. Blue Angel: The Life of Marlene Dietrich. Rowman & Littlefield, 2000.
