= Lace (1926 film) =

1926 film

- Directed by: Holger-Madsen
- Written by: Julius Urgiß
- Starring: Olaf Fønss; Elisabeth Pinajeff; Evelyn Holt
- Cinematography: Sophus Wangøe
- Music by: Hans May
- Production company: National Film
- Distributed by: National Film
- Release date: 10 September 1926
- Country: Germany
- Languages: Silent; German intertitles

Lace (German: Spitzen) is a 1926 German silent crime film directed by Holger-Madsen and starring Olaf Fønss, Elisabeth Pinajeff, and Evelyn Holt.

The film's sets were designed by the art director Alfred Junge.

== Cast ==
- Olaf Fønss
- Elisabeth Pinajeff as Juliane
- Evelyn Holt as Prinzessin Alix
- Robert Scholz as Freiherr v. Saza
- Heinrich Peer as Fürst v. Eyckhoff
- Margarete Schön
- Egon von Jordan as Fürst Ulrich v. Engernheim
- Hanni Reinwald as Berta Schmieder
- Joseph Karma as Johann Hotte
- Arthur Beder as Fritz Wildicke, Humpelfritz
- Dagmar Murzewa as Rose Moockel
- Leopold von Ledebur as Herr v. Heddersdorf
- Arne Weel as Julius Heidel, 'Heisere Wachtel'
- Jaro Fürth as Arzt
- Jesta Berg as Mutter Ursula
- Hans Adalbert Schlettow as Kriminalkommissar
- Paul Rehkopf as Säufer
- Maria Forescu as Kaschemmenwirtin
- Toni Tetzlaff as Roses Wirtin
- Fred Goebel
- Ossip Darmatow as Landgerichtsrat Hillstedt

== Bibliography ==
- Bock, Hans-Michael; Bergfelder, Tim, eds. (2009). The Concise Cinegraph: Encyclopaedia of German Cinema. New York: Berghahn Books. ISBN 978-1-57181-655-9.
