= Devoted Artists =

1919 film

- Directed by: Erik Lund
- Written by: Georg Kaiser
- Produced by: Erik Lund
- Cinematography: Curt Courant
- Distributed by: Ring-Film
- Release date: 1919
- Country: Germany
- Languages: Silent; German intertitles

Devoted Artists (German: Artistentreue) is a 1919 German silent film directed by Erik Lund.

The film's art direction was by Siegfried Wroblewsky.

== Cast ==
In alphabetical order

- Hanne Brinkmann
- Bruno Kastner
- Karl Platen
- Toni Tetzlaff
- Leopold von Ledebur

== Bibliography ==
- Bock, Hans-Michael; Bergfelder, Tim, eds. (2009). The Concise Cinegraph: Encyclopaedia of German Cinema. New York: Berghahn Books. ISBN 978-1-57181-655-9.
