= Debit and Credit (film) =

1924 film directed by Carl Wilhelm

- Heinrich George and Theodor Loos
- Directed by: Carl Wilhelm
- Written by: Karl Figdor; Gustav Freytag (novel); Carl Wilhelm
- Starring: Hans Brausewetter; Mady Christians; Theodor Loos
- Cinematography: Sophus Wangøe
- Production company: Carwil-Film
- Distributed by: Terra Film
- Release date: 10 October 1924
- Running time: 110 minutes
- Country: Germany
- Languages: Silent; German intertitles

Debit and Credit (German: Soll und Haben) is a 1924 German silent drama film directed by Carl Wilhelm and starring Hans Brausewetter, Mady Christians, and Theodor Loos. It is based on the 1855 novel Debit and Credit.

The film's art direction was by Robert A. Dietrich.

== Cast ==
- Hans Brausewetter as Anton Wohlfahrt
- Paul Graetz as Veitel Itzig
- Theodor Loos as Freiherr von Rothensattel
- Heinrich George as Hippus, Winkeladvokat
- Gertrud de Lalsky
- Mady Christians as Baroneß Leonore vin Rothensattel
- Robert Garrison as Makler Hirsch Ehrenthal
- Ilka Grüning as Madame Sidonie Ehrenthal
- Annie Röttgen
- Ernst Deutsch as Bernhard
- Hans Mierendorff as T. O. Schröter
- Olga Chekhova as Sabine
- Margarete Kupfer as Tante
- Bruno Kastner as Fritz von Fink
- Berthold Rose as Kanzlist Jordan
- Max Zilzer
- Gustav Trautschold as Kassierer Purzel
- Hermann Picha as Signierer Pix
- Karl Harbacher as Specht
- Theo Siegmund
- Carl Fenz as Zollkommis Birnbaum
- Karl Etlinger as Magazineur Balbus
- Heinrich George as Hippus, Winkeladvokat
- Hugo Döblin as Wirt Löbel Pinkus
- Ellen Plessow
- Lissi Kazar as Eugenie
- Fritz Sattler
- Karl Platen as Diener des Barons

== Bibliography ==
- Bock, Hans-Michael; Bergfelder, Tim, eds. (2009). The Concise Cinegraph: Encyclopaedia of German Cinema. New York: Berghahn Books. ISBN 978-1-57181-655-9.
