= The Bride of the Incapacitated =

1919 film

- Directed by: Erik Lund
- Written by: Rudolf Baron
- Produced by: Erik Lund
- Starring: Wilhelm Diegelmann; Eva May; Hermann Thimig
- Cinematography: Curt Courant
- Production company: Ring-Film GmbH
- Release date: 1919
- Country: Germany
- Languages: Silent; German intertitles

The Bride of the Incapacitated (German: Die Braut des Entmündigten) is a 1919 German silent film directed by Erik Lund.

The film's art direction was by Siegfried Wroblewsky.

== Cast ==
- Wilhelm Diegelmann
- Eva May
- Hermann Thimig

== Bibliography ==
- Bock, Hans-Michael; Bergfelder, Tim, eds. (2009). The Concise Cinegraph: Encyclopaedia of German Cinema. New York: Berghahn Books. ISBN 978-1-57181-655-9.
