= Harburger =

Harburger is a surname. Notable people with the name include:

- Edmund Harburger (1846–1906), German painter and draftsman
- Julius Harburger (1850–1914), New York City politician

== See also ==
- Harburger Berge (English: Harburg Hills), are a low ridge in the northeastern part of the German state
- Harburger Theater, is a theatre in Hamburg, Germany
