= Bruno Kastner =

German actor

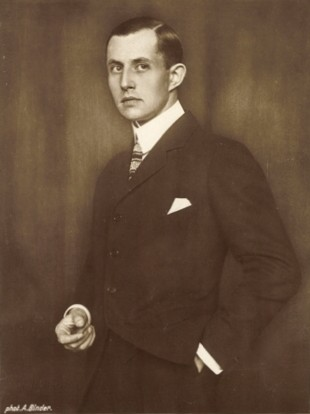
- Born: Richard Otto Bruno Kastner; January 1890; Forst in der Lausitz, Brandenburg, German Empire
- Died: 30 June 1932 (aged 42); Bad Kreuznach, Rhineland-Palatinate, Weimar Republic
- Occupation: Actor
- Years active: 1913–1930
- Spouse(s): Ida Wüst (m.1918–div.1924); Lisl Tirsch-Kastner (1925–1932)

Richard Otto Bruno Kastner (January 1890 – 30 June 1932) was a German stage and film actor, screenwriter, and film producer whose career was most prominent in the 1910s and 1920s during the silent film era. Kastner was one of the most popular leading men in German films during his career's peak in the 1920s.

== Early life ==
Richard Otto Bruno Kastner was born in Forst in der Lausitz, Brandenburg, in 1890, to Paul Ferdinand Richard Kastner, a tax collector, and Ida Elisabeth Emma Kastner (née Voigt). Kastner attended schools in Fürstenwalde and afterwards served a short, seventeen-day stint in the military before being relieved of his duties due to an injury.

He subsequently travelled to Berlin and took acting lessons from stage actor Paul Biensfeldt and then relocated briefly to Hamburg, where he performed at the Harburger Theater. After a brief period in touring companies, he worked as a choral singer and actor at the Meinhard-Bernauer Bühnen in Berlin.

== Career rise ==
During World War I, Kastner avoided military service, assessed as unfit for service due to his prior injury while serving before the war's outbreak. Discovered by Danish film actress Asta Nielsen, he made his film debut opposite her in the 1914 Urban Gad-directed comedy short Engelein (Little Angel), with Fred Immler and Hanns Kräly. He followed the success of this film with the sequel Engeleins Hochzeit (Little Angel's Wedding) in 1916. In the interim, Kastner quickly became a matinee idol in Germany, especially popular with female fans. The German press commented on Kastner's rise to stardom and how vexed postmen were having to transport love letters from fans to Kastner in laundry baskets. Kastner cemented his romantic image by appearing as the ardent suitor to popular actress Dorrit Weixler in a number of films of the era. Male filmgoers were less fond of Kastner's image of a handsome dandy and gave him the derisive nickname "Kleiderbügel" ("coat hanger") – a reference to his slim build and fashionable wardrobe.

Although he didn't carry much clout with many male filmgoers, his popularity with female fans gained momentum. In 1921, Kastner was voted "The Best German Actor" in a magazine poll and he began appearing that year in a film serial called Der Silberkönig (The Silver King) opposite leading lady Ossi Oswalda. The following year, he founded his own film company. Other popular films of the era included roles in Fritz Lang's Hilde Warren und der Tod (1917), Erik Lund's Das Herz des Casanova (1919) and Georg Jacoby's Das Paradies im Schnee (1924).

Kastner wrote the screenplays for four films that he would produce and star in: Nur ein Diener, Das Herz des Casanova, Der letzte Sonnensohn and Der Weltmeister, all directed by Erik Lund and released in 1919.

Kastner's career was almost cut short in 1924 when he was involved in a serious motorcycle accident in Lugano, Switzerland, which left him with permanent pain. He never fully recovered, but after a year of rest and recuperation, he returned to the screen in 1925.

== Career decline and death ==
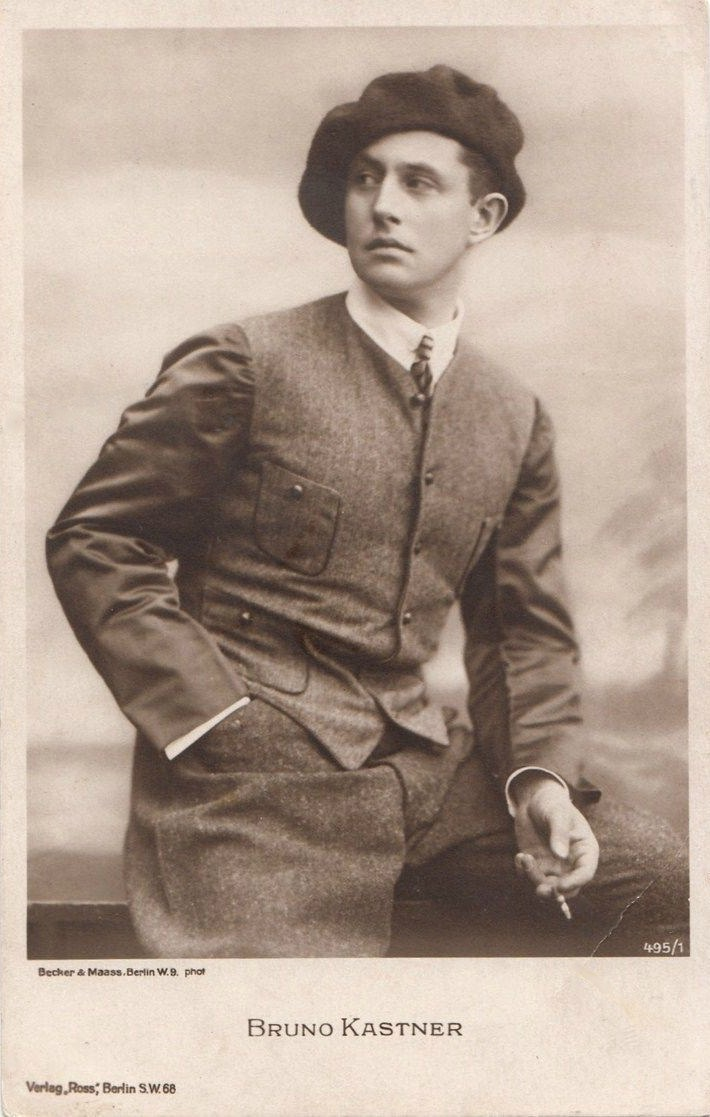
Bruno Kastner ca. 1920.

By the late 1920s, Kastner's career began to falter. No longer able to play the young, seductive bon vivant type which had made him famous, his roles in films grew smaller, although he still had a measure of success in such films as Karl Grune's 1926 drama Die Brüder Schellenberg with Conrad Veidt, Lil Dagover and Liane Haid and the Jacob Fleck and Luise Fleck-directed Der Orlow with Iván Petrovich and Hans Junkermann in 1927.

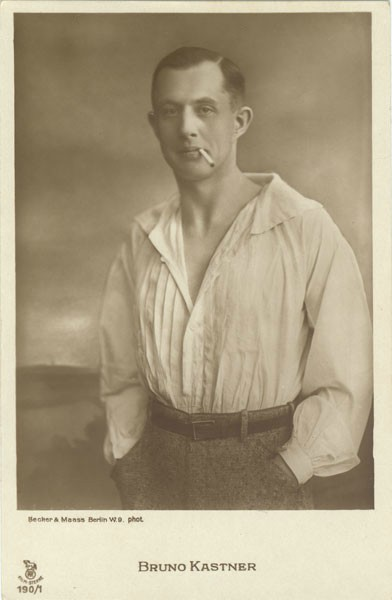
Bruno Kastner

The onset of sound films proved disastrous to Kastner's career in 1930 upon the release of his first talkie titled Das Land des Lächelns (The Land of Smiles) when filmgoers discovered that he stammered. He would only make one more film, 1930's unsuccessful Tingel-Tangel. After failing to garner any more film roles because of his speech impediment, he tried to revive his career by touring German theatres and permitting female members of the audience to get onstage and have their photograph taken with their past idol.

Kastner had depression after his rapid career decline. After two years of struggling to regain his public popularity, he rented a hotel room in Bad Kreuznach and committed suicide by hanging himself in June 1932. He was 42.

== Personal life ==
Kastner was married to German actress Ida Wüst from 1918 to 1924. The union ended in divorce and produced no offspring. In 1925, he married actress Lisl Tirsch-Kastner. The couple were still married at the time of Kastner's death.

== Selected filmography ==
- The Dancer (1915)
- The Lost Paradise (1917)
- Little Angel (1917)
- Hilde Warren und der Tod (1917)
- Wedding in the Eccentric Club (1917)
- The Onyx Head (1917)
- Five Minutes Too Late (1918)
- The Last Sun Son (1919)
- All Souls (1919)
- The World Champion (1919)
- The Golden Lie (1919)
- The Bodega of Los Cuerros (1919)
- The Heart of Casanova (1919)
- Only a Servant (1919)
- Devoted Artists (1919)
- Between Two Worlds (1919)
- Forbidden Love (1920)
- Alfred von Ingelheim's Dramatic Life (1921)
- The Secret of Castle Ronay (1922)
- Paradise in the Snow (1923)
- Comedians of Life (1924)
- Debit and Credit (1924)
- The Enchantress (1924)
- Colibri (1924)
- Darling of the King (1924)
- Three Waiting Maids (1925)
- If You Have an Aunt (1925)
- The Woman with That Certain Something (1925)
- Flight Around the World (1925)
- The Man Who Sold Himself (1925)
- The Assmanns (1925)
- The Trumpets are Blowing (1926)
- Vienna – Berlin (1926)
- The Divorcée (1926)
- When She Starts, Look Out 1926)
- The Brothers Schellenberg (1926)
- Eva and the Grasshopper (1927)
- The Most Beautiful Legs of Berlin (1927)
- The Lady with the Tiger Skin (1927)
- The Orlov (1927)
- Luther (1928)
- Angst (1928)
- Fair Game (1928)
- The Duty to Remain Silent (1928)
- My Friend Harry (1928)
- The Land of Smiles (1930)
