= Ruth Goetz (German screenwriter) =

German screenwriter

- Born: 5 November 1886; Oberglogau, Silesia, Germany
- Died: 19 June 1965 (aged 78); London, England
- Occupation: Screenwriter

Ruth Goetz was a German screenwriter active during the silent era. She was credited on more than 60 films over the course of her career.

== Selected filmography ==
- The Beggar Countess (dir. Joe May and Bruno Ziener, 1918)
- The Platonic Marriage (dir. Paul Leni, 1919)
- Veritas Vincit (dir. Joe May, 1919)
- The Bodega of Los Cuerros (dir. Erik Lund, 1919)
- The Foolish Heart (dir. Erik Lund, 1919)
- The Mistress of the World (dir. Joe May, 1919–1920)
- The Enchanted Princess (dir. Erik Lund, 1919)
- The Fairy of Saint Ménard (dir. Erik Lund, 1919)
- The World Champion (dir. Erik Lund, 1919)
- The Last Sun Son (dir. Erik Lund, 1919)
- The Commandment of Love (dir. Erik Lund, 1919)
- The Eyes of the World (dir. Carl Wilhelm, 1920)
- The Clan (dir. Carl Wilhelm, 1920)
- The Three Aunts (dir. Rudolf Biebrach, 1921)
- The Circle of Death (dir. William Karfiol, 1922)
- The Second Shot (dir. Maurice Krol, 1923)
- The Island of Tears (dir. Lothar Mendes, 1923)
- The Great Industrialist (dir. Fritz Kaufmann, 1923)
- The Four Marriages of Matthias Merenus (dir. Werner Funck, 1924)
- The Monk from Santarem (dir. Lothar Mendes, 1924)
- Reveille: The Great Awakening (dir. Fritz Kaufmann, 1925)
- The Salesgirl from the Fashion Store (dir. Wolfgang Neff, 1925)
- In the Valleys of the Southern Rhine (dir. Rudolf Walther-Fein and Rudolf Dworsky, 1925)
- The Fallen (dir. Rudolf Walther-Fein and Rudolf Dworsky, 1926)
- Women and Banknotes (dir. Fritz Kaufmann, 1926)
- The Adventurers (dir. Rudolf Walther-Fein, 1926)
- Marriage Announcement (dir. Fritz Kaufmann, 1926)
- Accommodations for Marriage (dir. Georg Jacoby, 1926)
- Tragedy of a Marriage (dir. Maurice Elvey, 1927)
- Tragedy of the Street (dir. Bruno Rahn, 1927)
- A Murderous Girl (dir. Sidney Morgan, 1927)
- The Glass Boat (dir. Constantin J. David and Jacqueline Milliet, 1927)
- Give Me Life (dir. Klaus Fery, 1928)
