= Black Pearls (1919 film) =

1919 film

- Directed by: Erik Lund
- Produced by: Erik Lund
- Cinematography: Curt Courant
- Distributed by: Ring-Film
- Release date: 1919
- Country: Germany
- Languages: Silent; German intertitles

Black Pearls (German: Schwarze Perlen) is a 1919 German silent film directed by Erik Lund and starring Eva May.

== Bibliography ==
- Bock, Hans-Michael; Bergfelder, Tim, eds. (2009). The Concise Cinegraph: Encyclopaedia of German Cinema. New York: Berghahn Books. ISBN 978-1-57181-655-9.
