= The Foolish Heart =

- Directed by: Erik Lund
- Written by: Ruth Goetz
- Produced by: Erik Lund
- Cinematography: Curt Courant
- Distributed by: Ring-Film
- Release date: August 1919
- Country: Germany
- Languages: Silent; German intertitles

The Foolish Heart (German: Das törichte Herz) is a 1919 German silent film directed by Erik Lund.

== Cast ==
In alphabetical order

- Olga Engl
- Eva May
- Karl Platen
- Hermann Thimig
- Leopold von Ledebur

== Bibliography ==
- Hans-Michael Bock and Tim Bergfelder. The Concise Cinegraph: An Encyclopedia of German Cinema. Berghahn Books.
