= The Blonde Nightingale =

1930 film

- Directed by: Johannes Meyer
- Written by: Walter Schlee; Walter Wassermann
- Produced by: Carl Froelich
- Starring: Ernst Behmer; Else Elster; Erich Kestin
- Cinematography: Werner Brandes
- Music by: Willi Kollo; Otto Stransky
- Production company: UFA
- Distributed by: UFA
- Release date: 6 November 1930
- Running time: 82 minutes
- Country: Germany
- Language: German

The Blonde Nightingale (German: Die blonde Nachtigall) is a 1930 German musical film directed by Johannes Meyer and starring Ernst Behmer, Else Elster and Erich Kestin.

The film's sets were designed by the art director Willi Herrmann.

== Cast ==
- Ernst Behmer as Gustav Schubert
- Else Elster as Grete, seine Tochter
- Arthur Hell as Walter Heller
- Walter Steiner as Bumke
- Erich Kestin as Karl, Waiter
- Leopold von Ledebur as Scheffelberg
- Berthe Ostyn as Leonie, seine Tochter
- Siegfried Berisch as Goldstein
- Wilhelm Bendow as Palme
- Paul Kemp as Hirschfield
- Jens Keith as Der Tänzer
- Anna Müller-Lincke as Karoline Bumke, Ehegattin
- Hans Hermann Schaufuß as Bastini
- Corinne Williams as Frl. Lenz, Turnlehrerin

== Bibliography ==
- Bock, Hans-Michael; Bergfelder, Tim, eds. (2009). The Concise Cinegraph: Encyclopaedia of German Cinema. New York: Berghahn Books. ISBN 978-1-57181-655-9.
