= The Trumpets are Blowing =

1926 film directed by Carl Boese

- Directed by: Carl Boese
- Written by: Paul Oskar Höcker (novel); Friedrich Stein
- Starring: Bruno Kastner; Hugo Fischer-Köppe; Eddie Seefeld
- Cinematography: Alfred Hansen
- Production company: Terra Film
- Distributed by: Terra Film
- Release date: 30 March 1926
- Country: Germany
- Languages: Silent; German intertitles

The Trumpets are Blowing (German: Es blasen die Trompeten) is a 1926 German silent film directed by Carl Boese and starring Bruno Kastner, Hugo Fischer-Köppe, and Eddie Seefeld.

== Cast ==
- Bruno Kastner
- Hugo Fischer-Köppe
- Eddie Seefeld
- Hans Albers
- Erich Kaiser-Titz
- Anita Dorris
- Fritz Spira
- Karl Elzer
- Ruth Weyher

== Bibliography ==
- Hans-Michael Bock and Tim Bergfelder. The Concise Cinegraph: An Encyclopedia of German Cinema. Berghahn Books, 2009.
