= Weltmeister =

Weltmeister (German for World Champion) may refer to

- Music instruments by VEB Klingenthaler Harmonikawerke
- Weltmeister (marque) - A Chinese car brand of WM Motors (Chinese: 威马汽车制造温州有限公司)
- The World Champion (German: Der Weltmeister), a 1919 German silent film
