= When She Starts, Look Out =

When She Starts, Look Out may refer to:

- When She Starts, Look Out (1926 film), a German silent comedy film
- When She Starts, Look Out (1958 film), a West German musical comedy film
