= Forbidden Love (1920 film) =

1920 film

- Directed by: Erik Lund
- Produced by: Erik Lund
- Cinematography: Curt Courant
- Distributed by: Ring-Film
- Release date: 1920
- Country: Germany
- Languages: Silent; German intertitles

Forbidden Love (German: Verbotene Liebe) is a 1920 German silent film directed by Erik Lund.

== Cast ==
- Esther Hagan
- Bruno Kastner

== Bibliography ==
- Bock, Hans-Michael; Bergfelder, Tim, eds. (2009). The Concise Cinegraph: Encyclopaedia of German Cinema. New York: Berghahn Books. ISBN 978-1-57181-655-9.
