= The Enchanted Princess (film) =

- Directed by: Erik Lund
- Written by: Ruth Goetz
- Produced by: Erik Lund
- Cinematography: Curt Courant
- Distributed by: Ring-Film
- Release date: 1919
- Country: Germany
- Languages: Silent; German intertitles

The Enchanted Princess (German:Die verwunschene Prinzessin) is a 1919 German silent film directed by Erik Lund.

== Cast ==
In alphabetical order

- Ernst Behmer
- Olga Dalzell
- Olga Engl
- Eva May
- Johannes Riemann
- Leopold von Ledebur
- Anna von Palen
- Emmy Wyda

== Bibliography ==
- Hans-Michael Bock and Tim Bergfelder. The Concise Cinegraph: An Encyclopedia of German Cinema. Berghahn Books.
