= Karl Platen =

German actor

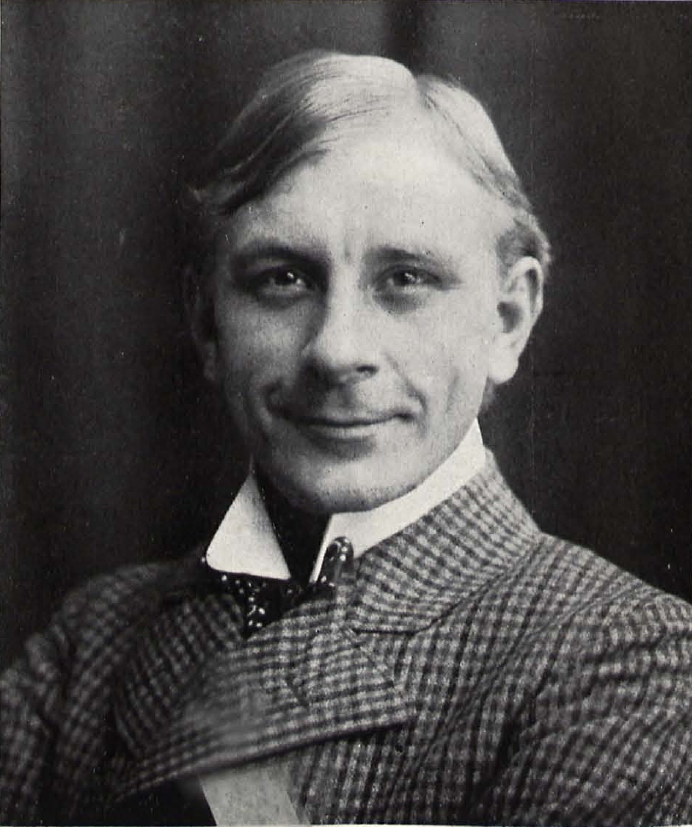
- Platen in 1906
- Born: Carl Platen; 6 March 1877; Halle, German Empire
- Died: 4 July 1952 (aged 75); Weimar, East Germany
- Occupation: Actor
- Years active: 1913–1949

Karl Platen (6 March 1877 – 4 July 1952) was a German actor and cinematographer of the silent era and later the sound era and known for Girl in the Moon (1929) and M (1931).

== Biography ==
Karl Platen was born as Carl Platen on March 6, 1877, in Halle an der Saale, Germany. He died on July 4, 1952, in Weimar, German Democratic Republic at the age of 75.

== Selected filmography ==
- Ein Ausgestoßener (1913, part 1)
- Der Katzensteg (1915) - Pfarrer
- Die Erben des Geizhalses (1915) - Pflegesohn von Riedel Hermann
- The Japanese Woman (1919)
- Hängezöpfchen (1919) - Prof. Hahnensporn
- Das rosa Strumpfbändchen (1919)
- The Boy in Blue (1919) - Alter Diener / Old servant
- The Foolish Heart (1919, Short)
- The Bodega of Los Cuerros (1919)
- Madame Dubarry (1919) - Guillaume Dubarry
- Der rote Sarafan (1919)
- Seine Beichte (Bekenntnisse eines Lebemannes) (1919) - Diener Franz
- Irrlicht (1919)
- The Golden Lie (1919)
- Die fremde Frau (1919)
- Der Mitternachtsassessor (1919)
- Only a Servant (1919)
- Zwischen Lachen und Weinen (1919) - Prof. Brodersen
- Love (1919) - Erster Sekretär bei Illing
- The Fairy of Saint Ménard (1919)
- The World Champion (1919)
- Der Weiberfeind (1919) - Arnold Knutschke
- The Last Sun Son (1919) - Prinz von Noowara
- The Heart of Casanova (1919)
- The Secret of the American Docks (1919) - Williams, Fakturist
- The Commandment of Love (1919)
- Devoted Artists (1919)
- All Souls (1919)
- Mary Magdalene (1920)
- Graf Sylvains Rache (1920) - Kammerdiener Jean
- Patience (1920) - Pfarrer
- Im Wirbel des Lebens (1920)
- The Princess of the Nile (1920) - Dr. Thesaurus
- Kri-Kri, the Duchess of Tarabac (1920)
- Der Schieberkönig (1920)
- The Eyes of the World (1920) - Prof. Hanous
- Fanny Elssler (1920)
- The White Peacock (1920)
- Der Henker von Sankt Marien (1920) - Stadtschreiber
- Catherine the Great (1920) - Feldmarschall Schwerin
- Anna Boleyn (1920) - Physician
- President Barrada (1920)
- Der langsame Tod (1920)
- Materia - Club der Toten (1920)
- The Bull of Olivera (1921) - De Barrios' Diener Lopez
- Hannerl and Her Lovers (1921)
- The Secret of the Mummy (1921) - Dr. Hollowan
- Count Varenne's Lover (1921)
- Susanne Stranzky (1921)
- Hazard (1921)
- Das Opfer der Ellen Larsen (1921) - Dr. Hennings, Arzt
- Playing with Fire (1921)
- Junge Mama (1921) - Kammerherr
- The Inheritance of Tordis (1921) - Schuster
- Der Silberkönig (1921, part 1-4)
- Das gestohlene Millionenrezept (1921) - Kriminalbeamter
- The Story of a Maid (1921) - Beamter
- The Story of Christine von Herre (1921)
- A Debt of Honour (1921) - Arzt
- Destiny (1921) - the apothecary
- Baron Bunnys Erlebnisse (1921, part 1)
- Lady Hamilton (1921) - Kammerdiener des Königs
- Mysteries of India (1921, part 1) - Rowlands Diener / Servant (uncredited)
- The Eternal Struggle (1921) - Diener
- The Passenger in Compartment Seven (1921)
- Fridericus Rex (1922-1923, part 2-4) - Kammerdiener \ sFredersdorff
- The Lost House (1922)
- Dr. Mabuse: The Gambler (1922) - Diener Tolds (uncredited)
- Maciste und die Javanerin (1922)
- Im Kampf mit dem unsichtbaren Feind (1922) - Professor Curtius
- Die fünf Frankfurter (1922) - Samuel
- Tabitha, Stand Up (1922)
- Jussuf el Fanit, der Wüstenräuber (1922)
- Der Kampf ums Ich (1922)
- Rivals (1923)
- The Last Battle (1923)
- Die Buddenbrooks (1923) - Pokurist
- Tatjana (1923)
- Warning Shadows (1923) - 2. Diener
- His Wife, The Unknown (1923) - Sam
- Die Radio Heirat (1924)
- Steuerlos (1924)
- The Secret Agent (1924) - Baumeister
- Debit and Credit (1924) - Diener des Barons
- Garragan (1924)
- The Stolen Professor (1924)
- Husbands or Lovers (1924)
- Deutsche Helden in schwerer Zeit (1924) - Marschall Blücher
- Lord Reginald's Derby Ride (1924)
- The Wig (1925) - Der alte Diener
- If Only It Weren't Love (1925)
- The Venus of Montmartre (1925) - Mon. Frossart
- The Flower Girl of Potsdam Square (1925) - Vorsitzender
- Express Train of Love (1925)
- What the Stones Tell (1925)
- The Dice Game of Life (1925) - Sein Diener
- The Old Ballroom (1925)
- The Telephone Operator (1925) - Jeff
- Love Story (1925)
- Shadows of the Metropolis (1925) - Diener bei Bernard
- The Adventure of Mr. Philip Collins (1926)
- Two and a Lady (1926) - Polizeirat Krag
- People to Each Other (1926) - Gefängnisgeistlicher
- Die Wiskottens (1926) - Vater Wiskotten
- Trude (1926)
- I Lost My Heart in Heidelberg (1926) - Georg Schröder - Corpsdiener
- The Golden Butterfly (1926) - Ein Oberkellner
- The Blue Danube (1926) - Florian Staudinger, Schuhmachermeister
- Des Königs Befehl (1926)
- Children of No Importance (1926) - Polizei
- The Sweet Girl (1926)
- Fadette (1926)
- State Attorney Jordan (1926)
- A Modern Dubarry (1926) - Diener
- Wenn Menschen irren. Frauen auf Irrwegen (1926)
- Violantha (1928) - Jeremias Zureich / Kneipenwirt / ihr Onkel
- Love (1927) - Diener
- The Man with the Counterfeit Money (1927)
- The Mistress (1927)
- Forbidden Love (1927) - Haushofmeister
- Flirtation (1927) - Franz, Lobmeiers Diener
- A Murderous Girl (1927)
- On the Banks of the River Weser (1927)
- Eva and the Grasshopper (1927)
- My Heidelberg, I Can Not Forget You (1927) - Georg Schröder, der Vater
- Grand Hotel (1927)
- Storm Tide (1927)
- Did You Fall in Love Along the Beautiful Rhine? (1927) - Dr. Birkel
- Le roman d'un jeune homme pauvre (1927)
- One Plus One Equals Three (1927) - Diener
- Wer wirft den ersten Stein? (1927)
- Der alte Fritz (1928, part 2) - Kammerhusar Strützky
- Luther (1928) - Bruder Franziskus
- Scampolo (1928) - Hotelportier
- The Runaway Girl (1928) - Franz, Diener im Hause Thoms
- Cry for Help (1928)
- Love's Masquerade (1928) - Diener
- In Werder blühen die Bäume... - Die Geschichte zweier lustiger Berliner Jungen (1928) - Droschkenkutscher Gustav
- His Strongest Weapon (1928) - Anders, Mann mit dem Zigarrenladen
- Sir or Madam (1928)
- Rasputin (1928) - Sawely, der Diener
- Her Dark Secret (1929) - Nachtportier
- The Burning Heart (1929)
- Asphalt (1929)
- Miss Midshipman (1929) - Hauswart
- The Hero of Every Girl's Dream (1929)
- Foolish Happiness (1929)
- Dawn (1929) - Berthold, ein Hauer
- The Black Domino (1929) - Jean, Diener
- Narkose (1929)
- Madame Lu (1929)
- Girl in the Moon (1929) - Der Mann am Mikrophon
- Wenn du einmal dein Herz verschenkst (1929)
- It's You I Have Loved (1929) - Kecgber
- Roses Bloom on the Moorland (1929) - Schäfer
- Nacht vor dem Tode (1929)
- Don Manuel, der Bandit (1929)
- The Immortal Vagabond (1930)
- End of the Rainbow (1930)
- Die Jugendgeliebte (1930)
- Rag Ball (1930) - Karl
- The Great Longing (1930) - Fridericus Rex
- Die Lindenwirtin (1930) - Rektor der Universität Bonn
- A Student's Song of Heidelberg (1930)
- Love's Carnival (1930)
- Wie werde ich reich und glücklich? (1930)
- The Land of Smiles (1930) - Eine alte Exzellenz / ein alter Chinese in der Operette
- Two People (1930) - Der Diener Florian
- Road to Rio (1931)
- Student Life in Merry Springtime (1931) - Der Professor
- Her Grace Commands (1931) - Kammerdiener
- M (1931) - Damowitz
- The Golden Anchor (1932)
- Durchlaucht amüsiert sich (1932) - Zeremonienmeister
- The Countess of Monte Cristo (1932) - Nachtportier
- The Dancer of Sanssouci (1932) - Fredersdorff
- Theodor Körner (1932)
- Eine von uns (1932)
- Spell of the Looking Glass (1932) - Lehmkuhl, Chefarzt im Gefängnislazarett
- Das Lied der Schwarzen Berge (1933)
- Anna and Elizabeth (1933) - Dorfarzt
- The Testament of Dr. Mabuse (1933)
- Glück im Schloß (1933) - Haushofmeister Hofbauer
- Du sollst nicht begehren... (1933) - Der Pfarrer
- The Love Hotel (1933) - Arzt
- The Voice of Love (1934) - Der Korrepetitor
- Elisabeth and the Fool (1934) - Ein Kanzleischreiber
- Such a Rascal (1934) - Oertel, Pedell
- Es tut sich was um Mitternacht (1934) - Gastwirt
- The Black Whale (1934) - Ein alter Schiffer
- The World Without a Mask (1934)
- My Heart Calls You (1934)
- Gypsy Blood (1934) - Zweiter Geiger
- Hanneles Himmelfahrt (1934) - Pleschke
- Music in the Blood (1934)
- Master of the World (1934) - Diener Josef
- Schwarzer Jäger Johanna (1934)
- Miss Liselott (1934) - Diener bei Osterloh
- Polish Blood (1934) - Constanty
- The Last Waltz (1934) - Grischa, Diener
- Invitation to the Dance (1934) - Schneider-Kakadu
- Hearts are Trumps (1934) - Ein Diener
- Don't Lose Heart, Suzanne! (1935)
- Ein falscher Fuffziger (1935) - Kampe, Kassierer
- Knockout (1935) - Der Inspizient
- An Ideal Husband (1935) - Phips, Diener bei Goring
- Dreams of Love (1935) - Jancsi, Diener bei Duday
- The Young Count (1935) - Professor Dodereit
- Der schüchterne Casanova (1936)
- Paul and Pauline (1936)
- The Hour of Temptation (1936) - Logenschließer in der Oper
- The Beggar Student (1936) - Stefan, Diener der Gräfin
- Männer vor der Ehe (1936)
- Ave Maria (1936) - Theaterinspizient
- The Unknown (1936) - Diener bei Platen
- The Night With the Emperor (1936) - Intendant des Erfurter Stadttheaters
- Ball at the Metropol (1937) - Werner, Diener
- Fridericus (1937) - Fredersdorf
- His Best Friend (1937) - Beamter im Inseratenbüro
- Love Can Lie (1937) - (uncredited)
- Gabriele: eins, zwei, drei (1937) - Konsulatsdiener
- Manege (1937)
- The Irresistible Man (1937) - Mitarbeiter der Vallier-Werke
- Monika (1938) - Diener
- Das große Abenteuer (1938)
- Petermann ist dagegen (1938) - Onkel Ernst' - Steward KdF.-Damper 'Der Deutsche
- Rätsel um Beate (1938)
- Faded Melody (1938) - Karl, Diener
- The Secret Lie (1938) - Konzertsaaldiener
- Grossalarm (1938)
- Frühlingsluft (1938)
- People Who Travel (1938) - Registrarbeamter
- You and I (1938)
- Napoleon Is to Blame for Everything (1938) - Angestellter im Pariser Theater (uncredited)
- Dance on the Volcano (1938) - Prinz Louis Philippes Diener Theodor (uncredited)
- Men, Animals and Sensations (1938)- Briefträger
- Der grüne Kaiser (1939) - (uncredited)
- Der vierte kommt nicht (1939)
- Robert Koch (1939) - Herr Kruhlke
- Brand im Ozean (1939) - Diener Pueblo
- We Danced Around the World (1939) - Werner, Sekretär
- Die keusche Geliebte (1940) - Lemoniers Diener
- Fahrt ins Leben (1940) - Pfandleiher
- Mistress Moon (1941) - Regisseur am Apollo-Theater (uncredited)
- Tanz mit dem Kaiser (1941)
- Sonntagskinder (1941) - Oberkellner Max
- Rembrandt (1942)
- Diesel (1942) - Der Büroangestellte im Vorraum bei Krupp
- Meine Frau Teresa (1942)
- Du gehörst zu mir (1943)
- The Eternal Tone (1943) - Diener
- Romance in a Minor Key (1943) - Michael's servant
- Kollege kommt gleich (1943) - Ein bei der Damenwahl erwählter Tänzer
- Die Feuerzangenbowle (1944) - Minor Role (uncredited)
- Das schwarze Schaf (1944)
- The Man in the Saddle (1945) - Gastwirt
- Free Land (1946)
- Der Posaunist (1949) - Franz Bittrich, 1. Posaunist (final film role)

== Bibliography ==
- Jung, Uli & Schatzberg, Walter. Beyond Caligari: The Films of Robert Wiene. Berghahn Books, 1999.
