= Between Two Worlds (1919 film) =

1919 film

- Directed by: Adolf Gärtner
- Written by: Adolf Gärtner; Bruno Kastner; Paul Rosenhayn
- Produced by: Erik Lund
- Starring: Olga Engl; Bruno Kastner; Lucie Mannheim
- Cinematography: Curt Courant
- Production company: Ring-Film
- Release date: February 1919
- Country: Germany
- Languages: Silent; German intertitles

Between Two Worlds (German: Zwischen zwei Welten) is a 1919 German silent drama film directed by Adolf Gärtner and starring Olga Engl, Bruno Kastner, and Lucie Mannheim.

== Cast ==
- Olga Engl
- Bruno Kastner as Betriebsleiter
- Max Laurence
- Lucie Mannheim
- Lina Paulsen
- Gustav Roos
- Magnus Stifter as Direktor Lüders
- Hanni Weisse

== Bibliography ==
- Rogowski, Christian (2010). The Many Faces of Weimar Cinema: Rediscovering Germany's Filmic Legacy. Rochester, NY: Camden House. ISBN 978-1-57113-429-5.
