= Leopold von Ledebur =

German actor (1876-1955)

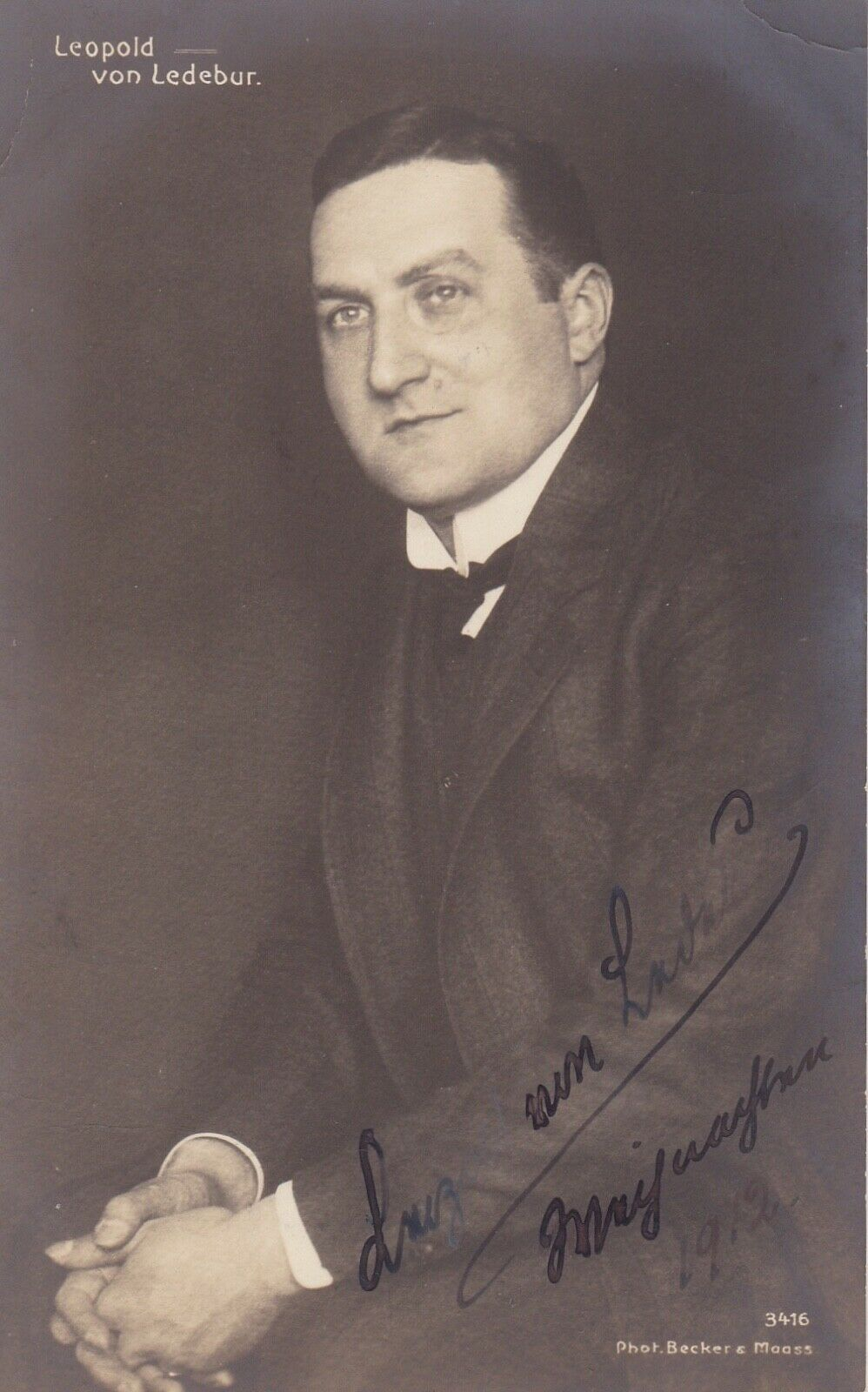
- Leopold von Lebedur ca. 1912
- Born: Leopold Ernst Gerhard Freiherr von Ledebur; 18 May 1876; Berlin, German Empire
- Died: 22 August 1955 (aged 79); Ruhwinkel, West Germany
- Occupations: Actor, Stage
- Years active: 1916–1951

Leopold von Ledebur (18 May 1876 – 22 August 1955) was a German stage and film actor.

== Selected filmography ==
- Carmen (1918)
- The Serenyi (1918)
- Midnight (1918)
- The Foolish Heart (1919)
- The Golden Lie (1919)
- The Gambler (1919)
- The Japanese Woman (1919)
- The Loves of Käthe Keller (1919)
- State Attorney Jordan (1919)
- The Bodega of Los Cuerros (1919)
- All Souls (1919)
- Devoted Artists (1919)
- The Carousel of Life (1919)
- Only a Servant (1919)
- The Last Sun Son (1919)
- The Fairy of Saint Ménard (1919)
- The Enchanted Princess (1919)
- Die Spieler (1920)
- Christian Wahnschaffe (1920)
- In the Whirl of Life (1920)
- World by the Throat (1920)
- The Skull of Pharaoh's Daughter (1920)
- Waves of Life and Love (1921)
- The Adventure of Doctor Kircheisen (1921)
- Count Varenne's Lover (1921)
- The Maharaja's Favourite Wife (1921)
- The House on the Moon (1921)
- Hashish, the Paradise of Hell (1921)
- Alfred von Ingelheim's Dramatic Life (1921)
- The False Dimitri (1922)
- Prashna's Secret (1922)
- To the Ladies' Paradise (1922)
- Inge Larsen (1923)
- Tatjana (1923)
- Maciste and Prisoner 51 (1923)
- Felicitas Grolandin (1923)
- Irene of Gold (1923)
- The Great Unknown (1924)
- Guillotine (1924)
- Nanon (1924)
- Orient (1924)
- Slaves of Love (1924)
- Spring Awakening (1924)
- Dudu, a Human Destiny (1924)
- Playing with Destiny (1924)
- Love's Finale (1925)
- The Iron Bride (1925)
- Goetz von Berlichingen of the Iron Hand (1925)
- Bismarck (1925)
- Wallenstein (1925)
- In the Name of the Kaisers (1925)
- The Third Squadron (1926)
- The Eleven Schill Officers (1926)
- The Mill at Sanssouci (1926)
- Princess Trulala (1926)
- Women of Passion (1926)
- Lace (1926)
- The Circus of Life (1926)
- The Prince and the Dancer (1926)
- The Long Intermission (1927)
- A Serious Case (1927)
- The Curse of Vererbung (1927)
- Lützow's Wild Hunt (1927)
- The Convicted (1927)
- My Aunt, Your Aunt (1927)
- Serenissimus and the Last Virgin (1928)
- Eva in Silk (1928)
- Escape from Hell (1928)
- The Woman from Till 12 (1928)
- The Lady from Argentina (1928)
- Panic (1928)
- Luther (1928)
- High Treason (1929)
- From a Bachelor's Diary (1929)
- Ship in Distress (1929)
- The Lord of the Tax Office (1929)
- Secret Police (1929)
- Youthful Indiscretion (1929)
- The Youths (1929)
- Sin and Morality (1929)
- The Customs Judge (1929)
- The Blonde Nightingale (1930)
- Achtung! – Auto-Diebe! (1930)
- The Man in the Dark (1930)
- Witnesses Wanted (1930)
- Dreyfus (1930)
- Sunday of Life (1931)
- Waves of Life and Love (1921)
- Shadows of the Underworld (1931)
- Frederica (1932)
- No Money Needed (1932)
- Secret Agent (1932)
- Distorting at the Resort (1932)
- Gretel Wins First Prize (1933)
- The Judas of Tyrol (1933)
- Music in the Blood (1934)
- The Higher Command (1935)
- The Old and the Young King (1935)
- Orders Are Orders (1936)
- Alarm in Peking (1937)
- Ball at the Metropol (1937)
- The Model Husband (1937)
- Don't Promise Me Anything (1937)
- The Roundabouts of Handsome Karl (1938)
- Nanon (1938)
- The Impossible Mister Pitt (1938)
- Napoleon Is to Blame for Everything (1938)
- You and I (1938)
- Target in the Clouds (1939)
- The Wedding Trip (1939)
- Robert Koch (1939)
- The Life and Loves of Tschaikovsky (1939)
- The Leghorn Hat (1939)
- Shoulder Arms (1939)
- Bismarck (1940)
- The Three Codonas (1940)
- Friedemann Bach (1941)
- Komödianten (1941)
- Riding for Germany (1941)
- The Great Love (1942)
- Der große König (1942)
- The Old Boss (1942)
- Münchhausen (1943)
- Johann (1943)
- Summer Nights (1944)
- The Noltenius Brothers (1945)
- Love '47 (1949)
- Don't Dream, Annette (1949)
- The Tiger Akbar (1951)
