= The Ghost Comes Home =

- Theatrical release poster
- Directed by: Wilhelm Thiele
- Screenplay by: Richard Maibaum; Harry Ruskin
- Based on: Der mutige Seefahre by Georg Kaiser
- Produced by: Albert E. Levoy
- Starring: Frank Morgan; Billie Burke; Ann Rutherford; John Shelton; Reginald Owen; Donald Meek
- Cinematography: Leonard Smith
- Edited by: William H. Terhune
- Music by: David Snell
- Color process: Black and white
- Production company: Metro-Goldwyn-Mayer
- Distributed by: Loew's Inc.
- Release date: March 8, 1940
- Running time: 79 minutes
- Country: United States
- Language: English

The Ghost Comes Home is a 1940 American comedy film directed by Wilhelm Thiele and written by Richard Maibaum and Harry Ruskin. The film stars Frank Morgan, Billie Burke, Ann Rutherford, John Shelton, Reginald Owen and Donald Meek. The film was released on March 8, 1940, by Metro-Goldwyn-Mayer.

It was based on a play by Georg Kaiser which had previously been made into the 1935 German film The Valiant Navigator by Hans Deppe.

== Plot ==
Pet store owner Vern Adams is going to catch a ship to help out his friend John Thomas, however he still has time before it ships, so Vern goes to a nightclub and ends up being arrested for 60 days. When he gets out he finds out that the ship sank and that his family is using the insurance money. Now Vern hides out, so his family is not arrested for fraud.

== Cast ==
- Frank Morgan as Vern Adams
- Billie Burke as Cora Adams
- Ann Rutherford as Billie Adams
- John Shelton as Lanny Shea
- Reginald Owen as Hemingway
- Donald Meek as Mortimer Hopkins, Sr.
- Nat Pendleton as Roscoe
- Frank Albertson as Ernest
- Harold Huber as Tony
- Hobart Cavanaugh as Ambrose Bundy
- Ann Morriss as Myra
- Don Castle as 'Spig'
- Tom Rutherford as Mortimer Hopkins, Jr.
- Renie Riano as Sarah Osborn
- Richard Carle as John Reed Thomas
