= The Last Sun Son =

1919 film

- Directed by: Erik Lund
- Written by: Ruth Goetz; Bruno Kastner
- Produced by: Erik Lund
- Cinematography: Curt Courant
- Distributed by: Ring-Film
- Release date: 1919
- Country: Germany
- Languages: Silent; German intertitles

The Last Sun Son (German: Der letzte Sonnensohn) is a 1919 German silent film directed by Erik Lund.

== Cast ==
In alphabetical order

- Olga Engl as Fürstin
- Bernhard Goetzke as Herzog
- Ria Jende
- Bruno Kastner as Horos
- Max Laurence as Herzog
- Karl Platen as Prinz von Noowara
- Leopold von Ledebur as Minister

== Bibliography ==
- Hans-Michael Bock and Tim Bergfelder. The Concise Cinegraph: An Encyclopedia of German Cinema. Berghahn Books. ISBN 978-0-85745-565-9.
