= Hedwig Pauly-Winterstein =

German stage and film actress

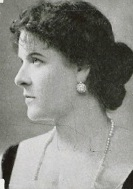
- Born: Hedwig von Wangenheim; 16 October 1866; Germany
- Died: 22 August 1965 (aged 98); Germany
- Other names: Hedwig Pauly
- Occupation: Actress
- Years active: 1920-1931

Hedwig Pauly-Winterstein (1866–1965) was a German stage and film actress.

== Selected filmography ==
- The Clan (1920)
- Anna Boleyn (1920)
- President Barrada (1920)
- Lady Godiva (1921)
- The Inheritance (1922)
- Tragedy of Love (1923)
- The Countess of Paris (1923)
- Alles für Geld (1923)
- The Little Duke (1924)
- Bismarck (1925)
- Countess Maritza (1925)
- State Attorney Jordan (1926)
- The Master of Death (1926)
- Professor Imhof (1926)
- The Mistress (1927)
- Ludwig II, King of Bavaria (1929)

== Bibliography ==
- Jung, Uli & Schatzberg, Walter. Beyond Caligari: The Films of Robert Wiene. Berghahn Books, 1999.
