= Paradise in the Snow =

1923 film

- German: Das Paradies im Schnee
- Directed by: Georg Jacoby
- Written by: Hanns Kräly; Robert Liebmann; Rudolph Stratz (novel)
- Produced by: Georg Jacoby
- Starring: Bruno Kastner; Lona Schmidt; Ferry Sikla
- Cinematography: Curt Courant; Robert Freckmann; Max Schneider
- Edited by: Georg Jacoby
- Production company: Georg Jacoby-Film
- Distributed by: Promo-Film
- Release date: 14 September 1923
- Countries: Germany; Switzerland
- Languages: Silent; German intertitles

Paradise in the Snow (German:Das Paradies im Schnee) is a 1923 German-Swiss silent film directed by Georg Jacoby and starring Bruno Kastner, Lona Schmidt and Ferry Sikla.

The film's art direction was by Ludwig Kainer.

== Cast ==
- Bruno Kastner as Edwin
- Lona Schmidt as Konstanza
- Ferry Sikla as Andersen
- Elga Brink as Mara Andersen
- Edith Meller as Daisy, Maras Freundin
- Hans Marr as Morris
- Georg Alexander as Bob
