= The Heart of Casanova =

1919 film by Erik Lund

- Directed by: Erik Lund
- Written by: Bruno Kastner; Erich Rennspies
- Produced by: Erik Lund
- Cinematography: Curt Courant
- Distributed by: Ring-Film
- Release date: 1919
- Country: Germany
- Languages: Silent; German intertitles

The Heart of Casanova (German: Das Herz des Casanova) is a 1919 German silent film directed by Erik Lund.

The film's art direction was by Siegfried Wroblewsky.

== Cast ==
- Ria Jende
- Bruno Kastner
- Rose Lichtenstein
- Karl Platen

== Bibliography ==
- Hans-Michael Bock and Tim Bergfelder. The Concise Cinegraph: An Encyclopedia of German Cinema. Berghahn Books.
