= The Commandment of Love =

1919 film

- Directed by: Erik Lund
- Written by: Ruth Goetz
- Produced by: Erik Lund
- Cinematography: Curt Courant
- Distributed by: Ring-Film
- Release date: 1919
- Country: Germany
- Languages: Silent; German intertitles

The Commandment of Love (German: Das Gebot der Liebe) is a 1919 German silent film.

== Cast ==
In alphabetical order

- Herbert Apel
- Ernst Behmer as Oskar Price
- Olga Engl
- Rita Georg
- Rose Lichtenstein
- Eva May
- Hermann Picha as Prokurist Hart
- Karl Platen
- Johannes Riemann
- Hermann Thimig

== Bibliography ==
- Hans-Michael Bock and Tim Bergfelder. The Concise Cinegraph: An Encyclopedia of German Cinema. Berghahn Books.
