= The Golden Lie =

- Directed by: Erik Lund
- Written by: Georg Kaiser
- Produced by: Erik Lund
- Cinematography: Curt Courant
- Distributed by: Ring-Film
- Release date: October 1919
- Country: Germany
- Languages: Silent; German intertitles

The Golden Lie (German: Die goldene Lüge) is a 1919 German silent film directed by Erik Lund.

The film's art direction was by Siegfried Wroblewsky.

== Cast ==
In alphabetical order

- Ria Jende
- Bruno Kastner
- Max Laurence
- Lina Paulsen
- Hermann Picha
- Karl Platen
- Leopold von Ledebur

== Bibliography ==
- Hans-Michael Bock and Tim Bergfelder. The Concise Cinegraph: An Encyclopedia of German Cinema. Berghahn Books.
