= The Fairy of Saint Ménard =

1919 film

- Directed by: Erik Lund
- Written by: Ruth Goetz
- Produced by: Erik Lund
- Cinematography: Curt Courant
- Distributed by: Ring-Film
- Release date: 1919
- Country: Germany
- Languages: Silent; German intertitles

The Fairy of Saint Ménard (German:Die Fee von Saint Ménard) is a 1919 German silent film directed by Erik Lund.

The film's art direction was by Siegfried Wroblewsky.

== Cast ==
In alphabetical order

- Margot Hermer
- Eva May
- Karl Platen
- Edwin Schäfer
- Marie von Buelow
- Leopold von Ledebur
- Kissa von Sievers

== Bibliography ==
- Hans-Michael Bock and Tim Bergfelder. The Concise Cinegraph: An Encyclopedia of German Cinema. Berghahn Books.
