= Gretel Wins First Prize =

1933 film directed by Carl Boese

- German: Gretel zieht das große Los
- Directed by: Carl Boese
- Written by: Carl Boese
- Produced by: Gustav Althoff
- Starring: Lucie Englisch; Leopold von Ledebur; Jakob Tiedtke
- Cinematography: Willy Hameister
- Edited by: Hilde Grebner
- Music by: Gustav Althoff; Hans Carste
- Production company: Aco-Film
- Release date: 21 December 1933
- Country: Germany
- Language: German

Gretel Wins First Prize (German: Gretel zieht das große Los) is a 1933 German comedy film directed by Carl Boese and starring Lucie Englisch, Leopold von Ledebur and Jakob Tiedtke. It was shot at the Babelsberg Studios in Berlin. The film's sets were designed by the art director Willi Herrmann.

== Synopsis ==
A young woman pretends to have won first prize in a lottery in an effort to boost her dreams of a career in radio.

== Cast ==
- Lucie Englisch as Gretel Schmidt, saleswoman
- Leopold von Ledebur as her boss
- Jakob Tiedtke as his uncle
- Hans Brausewetter as Willy Zinsler, pianist
- Hilde Hildebrand as Gerda, his divorced wife
- Walter Steinbeck as Herklotz, banker
- Margarete Kupfer as Frau Müller, Gretel's landlady
- Josefine Dora as Aufwartefrau
- Wilhelm Gerber as second musician
- Gertrud Boll as Gretel's girlfriend
- Herti Kirchner as Gretel's girlfriend
- Tilly Spatz as Gretel's girlfriend
- Hans Joachim Schaufuß as apprentice
- Ernst Behmer
- Alexander Bender as first musician
- Harry Berber
- Fred Goebel
- Heinz Klingenberg
- Georg Schmieter
- Grethe Weiser

== Bibliography ==
- Klaus, Ulrich J. Deutsche Tonfilme: Jahrgang 1933. Klaus-Archiv, 1988.
