= All for Money =

1923 film

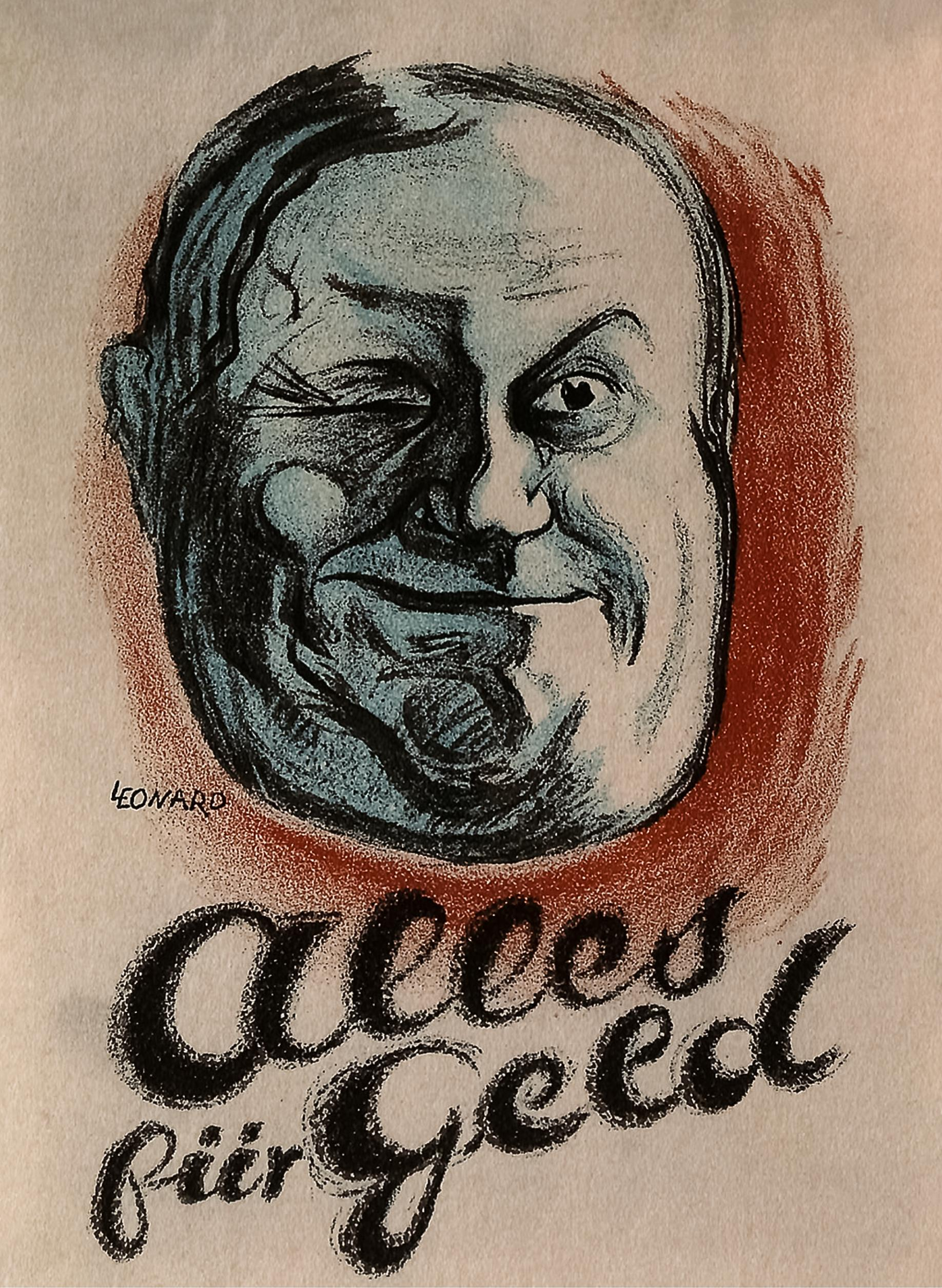
- Directed by: Reinhold Schünzel
- Written by: Hanns Kräly; Rudolph Stratz
- Produced by: Emil Jannings
- Starring: Emil Jannings; Hermann Thimig; Dagny Servaes
- Cinematography: Alfred Hansen; Ludwig Lippert
- Production company: Emil Jannings-Film
- Distributed by: UFA
- Release date: 5 November 1923
- Running time: 83 minutes
- Country: Germany
- Languages: Silent; Sound (Synchronized); German Intertitles (Silent); English Intertitles (Sound)

All for Money (German: Alles für Geld) is a 1923 German silent drama film directed by Reinhold Schünzel and starring Emil Jannings, Hermann Thimig, and Dagny Servaes. In 1928, a sound version was prepared for American audiences by Gotham Productions. While the sound version has no audible dialog, it was released with a synchronized musical score with sound effects using both the sound-on-disc and sound-on-film process. The film was shot at the Halensee Studios in Berlin. The film's sets were designed by the art director Kurt Richter.

== Cast ==
- Emil Jannings as S. I. Rupp
- Hermann Thimig as Fred Rupp
- Dagny Servaes as Asta
- Hedwig Pauly-Winterstein as Frau von Laar
- Walter Rilla as Henry von Lauffen
- Curt Goetz as Graf Ehrhardt
- Maria Kamradek as Sissy
- Paul Biensfeldt as Kammerdiener Pitt
- Ferry Sikla as Juwelier
- Ulrich Bettac as Fred Rupp
- Ernst Stahl-Nachbaur as Direktor der Goliath-Werke
- Heinrich Schroth as Direktor der Phönix-Werke
- Reinhold Schünzel as Schieber
- Max Kronert as Nachtwächter
- Ursula Nest as Egede

== Music ==
The sound version featured a song entitled “Fortune’s Fool” by Frank Padwa and Irving Mills.

== Preservation ==
A complete copy of the film is held by George Eastman House.

== Bibliography ==
- Grange, William (2008). Cultural Chronicle of the Weimar Republic. Lanham, MD: Scarecrow Press. ISBN 978-0-8108-5967-8.
