= A Man's Word =

- German: Eines Mannes Wort
- Directed by: Erik Lund
- Cinematography: Curt Courant
- Distributed by: Ring-Film
- Release date: 1919
- Country: Germany
- Languages: Silent; German intertitles

A Man's Word (German:Eines Mannes Wort) is a 1919 German silent film directed by Erik Lund and starring Bruno Kaster.
