= The Mistress (1927 film) =

1927 film directed by Robert Wiene

- Poster for the film's release
- Directed by: Robert Wiene
- Written by: Alexander Brody (play); Leo Birinsky
- Starring: Edda Croy; Harry Liedtke; Eugen Burg
- Cinematography: Laslo Benedek; Arpad Viragh
- Production company: Pan Europa-Film
- Distributed by: Filmhaus Bruckmann
- Release date: 10 February 1927
- Country: Germany
- Languages: Silent; German intertitles

The Mistress (German: Die Geliebte) is a 1927 German silent drama film directed by Robert Wiene and starring Edda Croy, Harry Liedtke and Eugen Burg. It was based on a play by Alexander Brody. It was the first film Wiene made after returning to Germany after two years working in Austria, although the film's location shooting was done in Vienna, where the story is set. The interiors were shot at the Marienfelde Studios of Terra Film in Berlin.

== Cast ==
- Edda Croy as Anna von Zizka
- Harry Liedtke as Prinz August
- Eugen Burg as Vater von Anna
- Hedwig Pauly-Winterstein as Mutter von Anna
- Hans Junkermann as Prinz Augusts Vater — der Herzog
- Adele Sandrock as Die Großmama
- Paul Heidemann as Der Adjutant
- Olga Engl
- Karl Platen

== Bibliography ==
- Jung, Uli & Schatzberg, Walter. Beyond Caligari: The Films of Robert Wiene. Berghahn Books, 1999.
