= Luther (1928 film) =

1928 film

- Directed by: Hans Kyser
- Written by: Cathedral priest B. Döhring; Hans Kyser
- Starring: Eugen Klöpfer; Rudolf Lettinger; Elsa Wagner
- Cinematography: Otto Ewald; Sophus Wangøe
- Music by: Wolfgang Zeller
- Production company: Cob Film
- Distributed by: Cob Film
- Release dates: 16 February 1928 (Berlin, Germany); 23 June 1929 (New York City, USA)
- Running time: 83 minutes
- Country: Germany
- Languages: Silent; German intertitles

Luther is a 1928 German film about the life of Martin Luther, father of the Protestant Reformation.

The silent film starred Eugen Klöpfer as Luther and Theodor Loos as Philipp Melanchthon, and was written by Berlin Cathedral chaplain Bruno Doehring.

It was shot at the Babelsberg Studios in Berlin. The film's sets were designed by the art directors Robert Herlth, Walter Röhrig and Werner Schlichting. It premiered at the UFA-Palast am Zoo.

== Cast ==
- Eugen Klöpfer as Martin Luther
- Rudolf Lettinger as Luther's father
- Elsa Wagner as Luther's mother
- Livio Pavanelli as Luther's friend Alexius
- Arthur Kraußneck as Staupitz
- Karl Platen as Brother Franziskus
- Theodor Loos as Melanchthon
- Hermann Vallentin as Karlstadt
- Karl Elzer as Friedrich the Wise
- Werner Schott as Johann the Steadfast
- Ferdinand von Alten as Miltitz
- Bruno Kastner as Ulrich von Hutten
- Leopold von Ledebur as Sickingen
- Ernst Rückert as Imperial Herald Caspar Sturm
- Georg Schmieter as Georg von Frundsberg
- Max Maximilian as Hans Sachs
- Max Grünberg as Albrecht Dürer
- Jakob Tiedtke as Tetzel
- Hans Wassmann as Robber Baron
- Alexander Murski as the printer Hans Lufft
- Heinz Salfner as Palace Captain Berlepsch
- Hans Carl Müller as Charles V, Holy Roman Emperor
- Max Schreck as Aleander
- Georg John as Cripple (disabled man)
