= Only a Servant =

- Directed by: Erik Lund
- Written by: Bruno Kastner; Ida Wüst
- Produced by: Erik Lund
- Cinematography: Curt Courant
- Distributed by: Ring-Film
- Release date: November 1919
- Country: Germany
- Languages: Silent; German intertitles

Only a Servant (German: Nur ein Diener) is a 1919 German silent film directed by Erik Lund.

The film's art direction was by Siegfried Wroblewsky.

== Cast ==
In alphabetical order

- Ernst Behmer
- Ria Jende
- Bruno Kastner
- Karl Platen
- Leopold von Ledebur
- Lotte Werkmeister

== Bibliography ==
- Hans-Michael Bock and Tim Bergfelder. The Concise Cinegraph: An Encyclopedia of German Cinema. Berghahn Books.
