= The World Champion =

1919 film by Erik Lund

- Directed by: Erik Lund
- Written by: Ruth Goetz; Bruno Kastner
- Produced by: Erik Lund
- Cinematography: Curt Courant
- Distributed by: Ring-Film
- Release date: 1919
- Country: Germany
- Languages: Silent; German intertitles

The World Champion (German: Der Weltmeister) is a 1919 German silent film directed by Erik Lund.

== Cast ==
In alphabetical order

- Jo Conradt
- Ria Jende
- Bruno Kastner
- Max Laurence
- Rose Lichtenstein
- Lotte Müller as Kind
- Karl Platen
- Toni Tetzlaff as Gräfin Aristo-Senkt

== Bibliography ==
- Hans-Michael Bock and Tim Bergfelder. The Concise Cinegraph: An Encyclopedia of German Cinema. Berghahn Books.
