= Max Laurence =

German actor

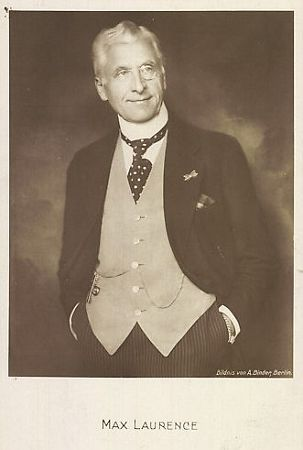
- Laurence c. 1916
- Born: Friedrich Rudolf Max Laurence; August 5, 1852; Berlin, Kingdom of Prussia
- Died: May 26, 1926 (aged 73); Berlin, Germany
- Years active: 1871–1923

Friedrich Rudolf Max Laurence (5 August 1852 – 26 May 1926) was a German stage and film actor.

== Selected filmography ==
- Where Is Coletti? (1913)
- The Dancer (1915)
- Hans und Hanni (1915)
- Mountain Air (1917)
- Diary of a Lost Woman (1918)
- Verlorene Töchter (1918)
- Die Augen der Mumie Ma (1918)
- Blonde Poison (1919)
- The Toy of the Tsarina (1919)
- The Secret of the American Docks (1919)
- Between Two Worlds (1919)
- The Last Sun Son (1919)
- The Golden Lie (1919)
- Veritas Vincit (1919)
- The World Champion (1919)
- The Apache of Marseilles (1919)
- Colonel Chabert (1920)
- Gypsy Blood (1920)
- Indian Revenge (1920)
- The Flying Car (1920)
- Jimmy: The Tale of a Girl and Her Bear (1923)

== Bibliography ==
- Hardt, Ursula. From Caligari to California: Erich Pommer's Life in the International Film Wars. Berghahn Books, 1996.
