= Curt Courant =

German cinematographer (1899–1968)

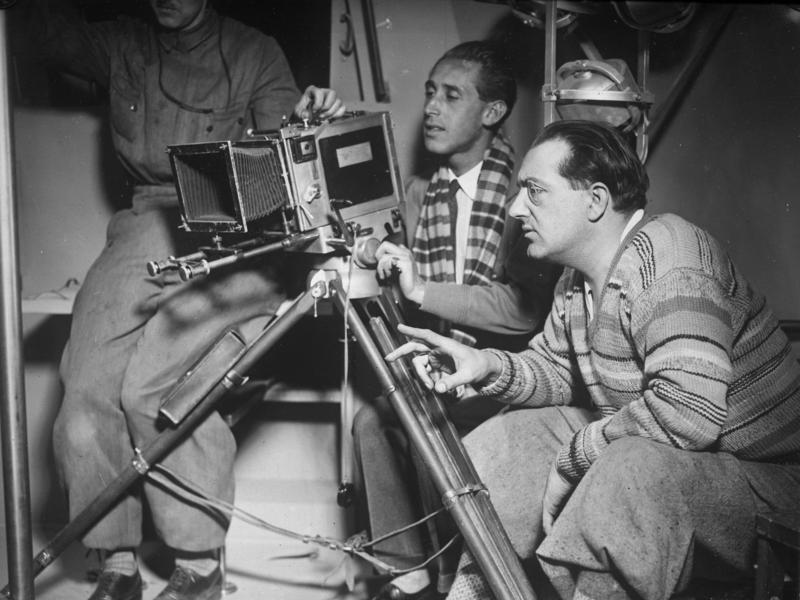
- Fritz Lang with cameraman Curt Courant (middle) on film Frau im Mond (1929)
- Born: 11 May 1899; Katowice, German Empire
- Died: 20 April 1968 (aged 68); Los Angeles, California
- Occupation: Cinematographer
- Years active: 1917–1962

Curt Courant (11 May 1899 – 20 April 1968) was a German-American cinematographer whose work includes more than 100 German and international films from the silent and early sound eras. Courant worked in several European countries, collaborating with figures such as Fritz Lang, Alfred Hitchcock and Charlie Chaplin. As he was of Jewish ancestry, Courant was forced to leave Germany in 1933 and go into exile following the Nazi takeover of power.

== Life ==
Curt Courant began his professional career as a cameraman in 1917 at Joe May's film production company in Berlin. In the following years, Courant became one of the most important cinematographers in German film. In 1920, the actress Asta Nielsen engaged him for her film version of Hamlet, in which he was behind the camera together with Axel Graatkjær. In 1924, he traveled to Rome to film the spectacular historical epic Quo Vadis (1924). The film impressed not only with its star cast, its army of extras and its circus animals, but also with its early experiments with widescreen formats. In 1927, Courant signed with Ufa and went on to make grandiose exotic spectacles such as Secrets of the Orient (1927/28) and The White Devil (1929), but also melodramas, including Kurt Bernhardt's The Woman One Longs For (1929) starring Marlene Dietrich and Fritz Kortner. In 1928/29, he shot Fritz Lang's science fiction adventure Frau im Mond together wit Otto Kanturek.

After the Nazi Party seized power in 1933, the Jewish Courant left Germany and gained an international reputation with a number of British and French films.

In Great Britain, he worked for Alfred Hitchcock on the thriller The Man Who Knew Too Much (1934), for Berthold Viertel on The Passing of the Third Floor Back (1935), a fascinating combination of documentary realism and spiritual allegory, and on John Brahms' remake of D. W. Griffith's Broken Blossoms (1936).

In France, Courant filmed some of the most important French films of the decade and worked with directors such as Jean Renoir (La Bête Humaine, 1938), Marcel Carné (Le jour se lève, 1939) and Max Ophüls (Sarajevo, 1940).

After the invasion of the Wehrmacht and the capitulation of France in 1940, Courant, like many other German artists and intellectuals, fled to the United States. Courant moved to Los Angeles and hoped to continue his career in the Hollywood film business. When the USA entered the war in 1941, he was assigned to the Special Services Division under Frank Capra. Courant's family remained in Germany. His mother, Nuscha Fanny Courant, was killed in the Chełmno extermination camp on May 13, 1942.

Despite several applications, the American Society of Cinematographers (ASC) refused him membership, which excluded him from studio work in Hollywood. Particularly in technical professions, American trade unions were keen to protect the interests of their members, which is why emigrated cameramen such as Courant or Eugen Schüfftan were rarely officially employed in film productions. Courant tried to sue for his membership in court and lost the case in 1950. Nevertheless, he worked as a co-cameraman for Charles Chaplin in 1947 on his film adaptation of Monsieur Verdoux. In 1961, he was behind the camera for the last time for the Jayne Mansfield film It Happened in Athens. In the absence of continuous film work, Courant began teaching as a lecturer at UCLA. He died on April 20, 1968, in Los Angeles.

== Selected filmography ==
Silent Films
- The Onyx Head (1917)
- Waves of Fate (1918)
- The Sacrifice (1918)
- The World Champion (1919)
- The Enchanted Princess (1919)
- The Foolish Heart (1919)
- State Attorney Jordan (1919)
- Only a Servant (1919)
- Irrlicht (1919)
- A Man's Word (1919)
- The Heart of Casanova (1919)
- Between Two Worlds (1919)
- The Bodega of Los Cuerros (1919)
- The Golden Lie (1919)
- The Commandment of Love (1919)
- Devoted Artists (1919)
- All Souls (1919)
- The Fairy of Saint Ménard (1919)
- The Last Sun Son (1919)
- The Bride of the Incapacitated (1919)
- Black Pearls (1919)
- In the Whirl of Life (1920)
- Forbidden Love (1920)
- President Barrada (1920)
- The Girl from Acker Street (1920)
- Comrades (1921)
- Hamlet (1921)
- Queen of the Streets (1921)
- The Stranger from Alster Street (1921)
- Alfred von Ingelheim's Dramatic Life (1921)
- A Day on Mars (1921)
- The Secret of Castle Ronay (1922)
- The Blood (1922)
- The Anthem of Love (1922)
- Peter the Great (1922)
- Paradise in the Snow (1923)
- The Slipper Hero (1923)
- Two Children (1924)
- Comedians of Life (1924)
- Quo Vadis (1924)
- Fire of Love (1925)
- The Island of Dreams (1925)
- The Brothers Schellenberg (1926)
- The Flight in the Night (1926)
- When She Starts, Look Out (1926)
- The Little Variety Star (1926)
- The Wooing of Eve (1926)
- The World Wants To Be Deceived (1926)
- Countess Ironing-Maid (1926)
- Family Gathering in the House of Prellstein (1927)
- The Trial of Donald Westhof (1927)
- The Csardas Princess (1927)
- The Dashing Archduke (1927)
- Secrets of the Orient (1928)
- Guilty (1928)
- Woman in the Moon (1929)
- The Woman One Longs For (1929)
- The Burning Heart (1929)
- The Jumping Jack (1930)
- The Singing City (1930)
- The King of Paris (1930, German)
- The King of Paris (1930, French)
- The White Devil (1930)

Sound Films

- City of Song (1931)
- My Cousin from Warsaw (1931)
- The Man Who Murdered (1931)
- Who Takes Love Seriously? (1931)
- The Unknown Singer (1931)
- His Highness Love (1931)
- Rasputin, Demon with Women (1932)
- Lilac (1932)
- This One or None (1932)
- Gitta Discovers Her Heart (1932)
- Scampolo (1932)
- A Son from America (1932)
- Thea Roland (1932)
- Ciboulette (1933)
- The Old Devil (1933)
- Perfect Understanding (1933)
- I Marry My Wife (1934)
- The Iron Duke (1934)
- The Man Who Knew Too Much (1934)
- Amok (1934)
- The Higher Command (1935)
- Me and Marlborough (1935)
- The Passing of the Third Floor Back (1935)
- She Knew What She Wanted (1936)
- Man in the Mirror (1936)
- Broken Blossoms (1936)
- Spy of Napoleon (1936)
- Cheer Up (1936)
- Dusty Ermine (1936)
- The Lie of Nina Petrovna (1937)
- Clothes and the Woman (1937)
- Princess Tarakanova (1938)
- La Bête Humaine (1938)
- Lights of Paris (1938)
- Sirocco (1938)
- Le Jour Se Lève (1939)
- Louise (1939)
- Monsieur Brotonneau (1939)
- Sarajevo (1940)
- Monsieur Verdoux (1947) uncredited
- It Happened in Athens (1962)

== Bibliography ==
- Bock, Hans-Michael & Bergfelder, Tim. The Concise Cinegraph: Encyclopaedia of German Cinema. Berghahn Books, 2009.
