= When She Starts, Look Out (1926 film) =

1926 film

- Directed by: Carl Froelich
- Written by: Carl Froelich; Wilhelm Stücklen
- Produced by: Carl Froelich; Henny Porten; Wilhelm von Kaufmann
- Starring: Henny Porten; Bruno Kastner; Curt Bois
- Cinematography: Curt Courant
- Music by: Erno Rapee
- Production company: Henny Porten-Froelich-Produktion
- Distributed by: UFA
- Release date: 20 May 1926
- Running time: 96 minutes
- Country: Germany
- Languages: Silent; German intertitles

When She Starts, Look Out (German: Wehe wenn sie losgelassen) is a 1926 German silent comedy film directed by Carl Froelich and starring Henny Porten, Bruno Kastner, and Curt Bois. It was shot at the EFA Studios in Berlin. The film's sets were designed by Franz Schroedter. It premiered the UFA-Palast am Zoo.

== Cast ==
- Henny Porten as Cäcilie / Liesl
- Bruno Kastner as Arved Angerapp
- Curt Bois as Ali ben Mokka
- Angelo Ferrari as Filmstar
- Paul Morgan as Regisseur
- Franz Groß as Friseur
- Alice Torning as Köchin

== Bibliography ==
- Bock, Hans-Michael; Bergfelder, Tim, eds. (2009). The Concise Cinegraph: Encyclopaedia of German Cinema. New York: Berghahn Books. ISBN 978-1-57181-655-9.
