= State Attorney Jordan (1919 film) =

- Directed by: Erik Lund
- Written by: Hans Land (novel)
- Produced by: Erik Lund
- Cinematography: Curt Courant
- Distributed by: Ring-Film
- Release date: 1919
- Country: Germany
- Languages: Silent; German intertitles

State Attorney Jordan (German:Staatsanwalt Jordan) is a 1919 German silent film directed by Erik Lund. It was based on a novel of the same title by Hans Land, which was later remade into a 1926 film.

The film's art direction was by Siegfried Wroblewsky.

== Cast ==
In alphabetical order

- Ernst Behmer
- Ernst Laskowski
- Eva May as Herta Hecker
- Lina Paulsen
- Hermann Picha
- Heinz Stieda
- Magnus Stifter as Staatsanwalt Jordan
- Leopold von Ledebur
- Emmy Wyda

== Bibliography ==
- Hans-Michael Bock and Tim Bergfelder. The Concise Cinegraph: An Encyclopedia of German Cinema. Berghahn Books.
