= The Secret of Castle Ronay =

1922 film

- Directed by: Erik Lund
- Cinematography: Curt Courant
- Production company: Orbis-Film
- Release date: 1922
- Country: Germany
- Languages: Silent; German intertitles

The Secret of Castle Ronay (German: Das Geheimnis von Schloß Ronay) is a 1922 German silent film directed by Erik Lund and starring Bruno Kastner.

The film's art direction was by Julian Ballenstedt.

== Bibliography ==
- Hans-Michael Bock and Tim Bergfelder. The Concise Cinegraph: An Encyclopedia of German Cinema. Berghahn Books.
