= In the Whirl of Life =

1920 film

- Directed by: Erik Lund
- Produced by: Erik Lund
- Cinematography: Curt Courant
- Distributed by: Ring-Film
- Release date: 7 May 1920
- Country: Germany
- Languages: Silent; German intertitles

In the Whirl of Life (German: Im Wirbel des Lebens) is a 1920 German silent film directed by Erik Lund.

The film's sets were designed by the art directors Siegfried Wroblewsky.

== Cast ==
In alphabetical order

- Georg Alexander
- Carl Fenz
- Max Gülstorff
- Paul Hartmann
- Eva May
- Hermann Picha
- Karl Plaen
- Toni Tetzlaff
- Leopold von Ledebur

== Bibliography ==
- Hans-Michael Bock and Tim Bergfelder. The Concise Cinegraph: An Encyclopedia of German Cinema. Berghahn Books.
