= Rose Liechtenstein =

German theater and film actress

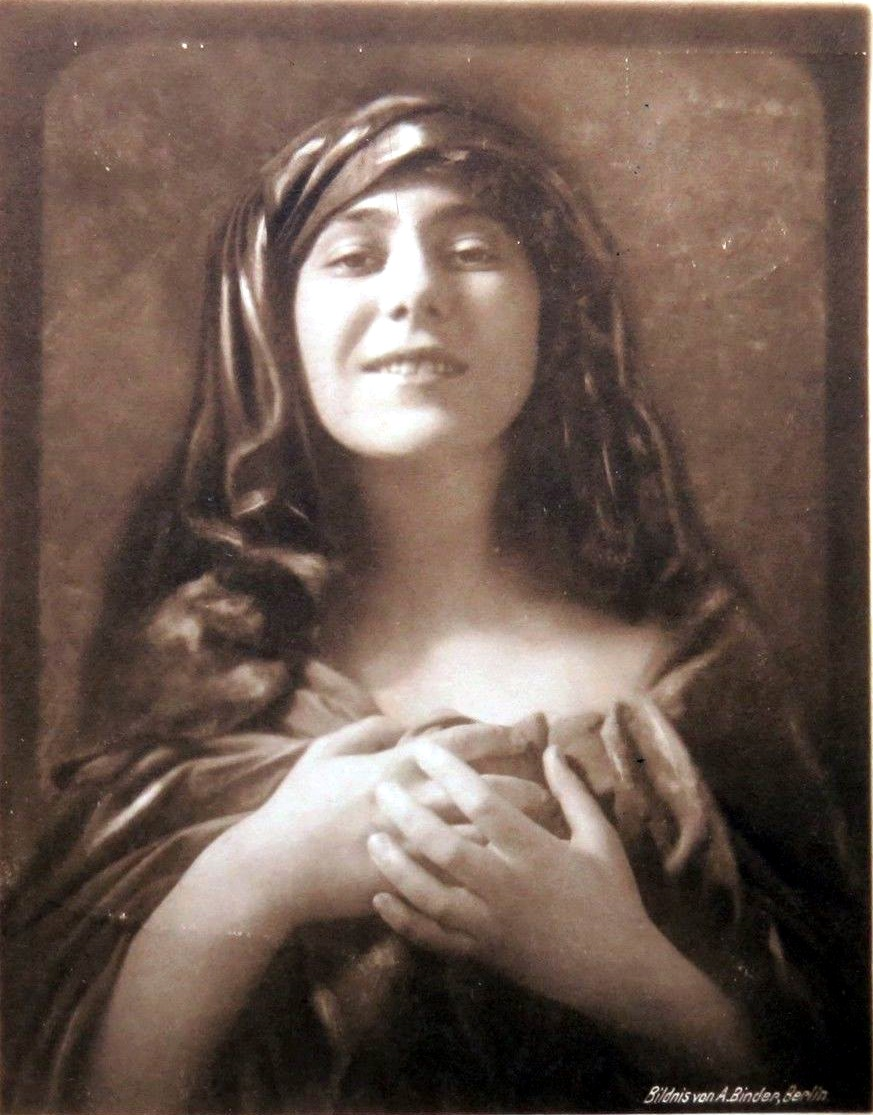
- Liechtenstein, c.1929
- Born: 26 March 1887; Landsberg an der Warthe, West Prussia
- Died: 22 December 1955 (aged 68); Tel Aviv, Israel
- Other name: Rose Lichtenstein
- Occupation: Actress
- Years active: 1909–1944

Rose Liechtenstein (26 March 1887 – 22 December 1955) was a German theater and film actress during the silent film era. She was also credited as Rose Lichtenstein.

== Life ==
Rose Liechtenstein was born in West Prussia in 1887. She received training at the Marie Seebach School before going to Meiningen in 1909 where her career has started. Engagements in Düsseldorf, Mannheim, Berlin and New York followed. Since 1915, Liechtenstein played in theaters in German-occupied territories in Belgium and France. Since 1916 she was also active in film business.

== Career ==
Among Liechtenstein's first films should be mentioned “Arme Eva Maria” (1916), “Der eiserne Wille” (1917), “Don Juans letztes Abenteuer” (1918), “Die Japanerin” (1919) and “Das Herz des Casanova” (1919). In the 1920s she appeared in many productions, the most well known among them are: "Dämmernde Nächte" (1920), "Moral" (1920), "Wie das Mädchen aus der Ackerstrasse die Heimat fand" (1921), "Die Tigerin" (1922). In addition to a number of different types of silent films, Liechtenstein played roles in Fritz Lang’s films “Nibelungen. Part 2” and in “Metropolis”. She also played in his first sound film “M – Eine Stadt sucht ein Mörder”, her last film before emigration.

Besides her stage work, Liechtenstein also made guest appearances on the radio in Berlin in the 1920s. She was the speaker in radio play productions of the “Berliner Funk-Hour”, for example in 1929 in “Straßenmann” by Hermann Kesser, directed by Alfred Braun.

In 1932 the almanac "Künstler am Rundfunk" dedicated a page to Liechtenstein where was written: “Rose Liectenstein was active on numerous stages at home and abroad. She is a frequent guest at the Berliner Funk-Hour. She loves her home and her cats, she has four of them.

As an artist of Jewish descent, she fled Nazi Germany to Palestine in 1933. In 1944 Liechtenstein was a part of the founding team of Teatron Kameri in Tel Aviv. There she developed into “the Israeli’s Adele Sandrock”.

Rose Liechtenstein died in Tel Aviv in 1955 at the age of 68.

== Filmography ==
- 1916: Arme Eva Maria
- 1916: Freitag, der 13. Das unheimliche Haus. 2. Teil
- 1917: Der eiserne Wille
- 1917: Die zweite Frau
- 1918: Don Juans letztes Abenteuer
- 1919: Dämmernde Nächte
- 1919: Das Gebot der Liebe
- 1919: Das Geheimnis des Amerika-Docks
- 1919: Das Herz des Casanova
- 1919: Der Mädchenhirt (by Egon Erwin Kisch)
- 1919: Die Bodega von Los Cuerros
- 1919: Die Braut des Cowboy
- 1919: Die Diamanten des Zaren
- 1919: Die Japanerin
- 1919: Die Toten kehren wieder. Enoch Arden
- 1919: Der Würger der Welt
- 1920: Moral
- 1920: Seine drei Frauen
- 1921: Die rätselhafte Zwölf
- 1921: Wie das Mädchen aus der Ackerstraße die Heimat fand. (Das Mädchen aus der Ackerstraße, 3. Teil)
- 1922: Die Tigerin
- 1922: Der Passagier in der Zwangsjacke
- 1922: Im Glutrausch der Sinne. 2. Die geschminkte Frau
- 1924: Die Nibelungen
- 1927: Metropolis
- 1931: M
