= The Flying Car (1920 film) =

1920 film directed by Harry Piel

- Scene from a film
- German: Das fliegende Auto
- Directed by: Harry Piel
- Written by: Max Bauer; Harry Piel
- Produced by: Harry Piel
- Starring: Harry Piel
- Cinematography: Georg Muschner
- Production company: Metro Film GmbH
- Release date: 10 September 1920
- Country: Germany
- Languages: Silent; German intertitles

The Flying Car (German: Das fliegende Auto) is a 1920 German silent fantasy film directed by and starring Harry Piel.

The film's sets were designed by the art director Albert Korell .

== Cast ==
In alphabetical order

- Friedrich Berger
- Richard Georg
- Max Laurence
- Harry Piel
- Fritz Schroeter
- Margot Thisset
- Thilde Thönessen
- Adolf Wenter
- William Zeiske
