= The Valiant Navigator =

1935 film

- Directed by: Hans Deppe
- Written by: George Hurdalek; Bobby E. Lüthge
- Based on: Der mutige Seefahrer, a play by Georg Kaiser
- Starring: Paul Kemp; Lucie Englisch; Maria Krahn
- Cinematography: Günther Anders
- Music by: Harald Böhmelt
- Production company: Minerva Tonfilm
- Distributed by: Tobis Film
- Release date: 27 September 1935
- Running time: 88 minutes
- Country: Germany
- Language: German

The Valiant Navigator or The Brave Seafarer (German: Der mutige Seefahrer) is a 1935 German comedy film directed by Hans Deppe and starring Paul Kemp, Lucie Englisch and Maria Krahn. It was based on a play by Georg Kaiser. The 1940 American film The Ghost Comes Home is an adaptation of the 1935 German film.

== Synopsis ==
A young man plans to emigrate to the United States with his fiancée but becomes extremely fearful about the ocean crossing due to a local superstition. Eventually he decides to stay at home and marry his girl.

== Cast ==
- Paul Kemp as Berthold Jebs
- Lucie Englisch as Grete Holm
- Maria Krahn as Paula Jebs
- Harald Paulsen as Otto Jebs
- Otto Wernicke as Bäckermeister Holm
- Carsta Löck as Tine Peterson
- Harry Frank as Joe Jefferson
- Paul Westermeier as Timm, ein Landstreicher
- Hans Mierendorff as Jan, ein Matrose
- Paul Beckers
- Elli Blank
- Rudolf Essek
- Karl Harbacher
- Oskar Höcker
- Werner Pledath
- Arthur Reppert
- Ernst Rückert
- Otto Sauter-Sarto
- Willi Schaeffers
- Hans Hermann Schaufuß
- Toni Tetzlaff
- Petra Unkel

== Bibliography ==
- Waldman, Harry. Nazi Films in America, 1933-1942. McFarland, 2008.
