= Irrlicht (film) =

- Directed by: Erik Lund
- Produced by: Erik Lund
- Cinematography: Curt Courant
- Distributed by: Ring-Film
- Release date: October 1919
- Country: Germany
- Languages: Silent; German intertitles

Irrlicht is a 1919 German silent film directed by Erik Lund.

The film's art direction was by Siegfried Wroblewsky.

== Cast ==
In alphabetical order

- Olga Engl
- Eva May
- Hermann Picha
- Karl Platen
- Wilhelm Prager
- Johannes Riemann
- Eduard von Winterstein

== Bibliography ==
- Hans-Michael Bock and Tim Bergfelder. The Concise Cinegraph: An Encyclopedia of German Cinema. Berghahn Books, 2009.
