= The Dancer (1915 film) =

1915 film

- German: Die Tänzerin
- Directed by: Georg Jacoby
- Written by: Georg Jacoby
- Produced by: Paul Davidson
- Starring: Leopoldine Konstantin; Bruno Kastner
- Production company: PAGU
- Distributed by: PAGU
- Release date: 3 December 1915
- Running time: 63 minutes
- Country: Germany
- Languages: Silent; German intertitles

The Dancer (German: Die Tänzerin) is a 1915 German silent drama film directed by Georg Jacoby and starring Leopoldine Konstantin, and Bruno Kastner.

It was shot at the Tempelhof Studios in Berlin.

== Cast ==
- Adolf Baumann
- Ludwig Hartau
- Tatjana Irrah
- Bruno Kastner
- Leopoldine Konstantin
- Max Laurence
