= Ernst Behmer =

German actor (1875–1938)

Ernst Behmer (22 December 1875 – 26 February 1938) was a prolific German stage and film actor who appeared in more than a hundred films during the silent and early sound eras.

Behmer was born in Königsberg, East-Prussia, Germany (now Kaliningrad, Russia) and died in Berlin at age 62.

== Selected filmography ==
- Ferdinand Lassalle (1918)
- The Enchanted Princess (1919)
- The Commandment of Love (1919)
- State Attorney Jordan (1919)
- Only a Servant (1919)
- Kri-Kri, the Duchess of Tarabac (1920)
- Kean (1921)
- The Story of a Maid (1921)
- The Golden Bullet (1921)
- The Homecoming of Odysseus (1922)
- A Woman, an Animal, a Diamond (1923)
- By Order of Pompadour (1924)
- The Girl with a Patron (1925)
- Children of No Importance (1926)
- The Armoured Vault (1926)
- Watch on the Rhine (1926)
- Love's Joys and Woes (1926)
- The Violet Eater (1926)
- Roses from the South (1926)
- Sister Veronika (1927)
- The Orlov (1927)
- The Catwalk (1927)
- The Blue Mouse (1928)
- The Beaver Coat (1928)
- The Last Night (1928)
- Panic (1928)
- Don Juan in a Girls' School (1928)
- Secret Police (1929)
- His Best Friend (1929)
- Mischievous Miss (1930)
- The Rhineland Girl (1930)
- The Jumping Jack (1930)
- The Immortal Vagabond (1930)
- The Blonde Nightingale (1930)
- The Shot in the Sound Film Studio (1930)
- Marriage in Name Only (1930)
- The Love Market (1930)
- A Student's Song of Heidelberg (1930)
- Hocuspocus (1930)
- People in the Fire (1930)
- The Tiger Murder Case (1930)
- Ein Walzer im Schlafcoupé (1930)
- Terror of the Garrison (1931)
- Who Takes Love Seriously? (1931)
- Berlin-Alexanderplatz (1931)
- Duty Is Duty (1931)
- Between Night and Dawn (1931)
- Student Life in Merry Springtime (1931)
- Without Meyer, No Celebration is Complete (1931)
- The Magic Top Hat (1932)
- Modern Dowry (1932)
- Chauffeur Antoinette (1932)
- Spoiling the Game (1932)
- A Blonde Dream (1932)
- The Blue of Heaven (1932)
- The Cheeky Devil (1932)
- Spies at the Savoy Hotel (1932)
- The White Demon (1932)
- Two Hearts Beat as One (1932)
- Man Without a Name (1932)
- A Shot at Dawn (1932)
- Impossible Love (1932)
- Love Must Be Understood (1933)
- The Roberts Case (1933)
- Two Good Comrades (1933)
- The Gentleman from Maxim's (1933)
- Gretel Wins First Prize (1933)
- Inge and the Millions (1933)
- The Country Schoolmaster (1933)
- Hitlerjunge Quex (1933)
- The World Without a Mask (1934)
- Miss Liselott (1934)
- Love and the First Railway (1934)
- Music in the Blood (1934)
- The Girlfriend of a Big Man (1934)
- The Four Musketeers (1934)
- Holiday From Myself (1934)
- The Cousin from Nowhere (1934)
- What Am I Without You (1934)
- Police Report (1934)
- Lessons in Love (1935)
- The Young Count (1935)
- Punks Arrives from America (1935)
- The Valley of Love (1935)
- City of Anatol (1936)
- Back in the Country (1936)
- Paul and Pauline (1936)
- Moscow-Shanghai (1936)
- The Czar's Courier (1936)
- The Three Around Christine (1936)
- Donogoo Tonka (1936)
- The Beggar Student (1936)
- The Traitor (1936)
- Gasparone (1937)
- Capers (1937)
- Dangerous Game (1937)
- Woman's Love—Woman's Suffering (1937)
- The Man Who Was Sherlock Holmes (1937)
- Seven Slaps (1937)
- Faded Melody (1938)
- Comrades at Sea (1938)
- The Marriage Swindler (1938)

== Bibliography ==
- Rentschler, Eric. The Ministry of Illusion: Nazi Cinema and Its Afterlife. Harvard University Press, 1996.
