= State Attorney Jordan (1926 film) =

1926 film directed by Karl Gerhardt

- Directed by: Karl Gerhardt
- Written by: Jane Bess; Hans Land (novel); Adolf Lantz
- Produced by: Joe May
- Starring: Hans Mierendorff; Hedwig Pauly-Winterstein; Paul Henckels
- Cinematography: Edgar S. Ziesemer
- Music by: Willy Schmidt-Gentner
- Production company: May-Film
- Distributed by: Phoebus Film
- Release date: 2 December 1926
- Running time: 79 minutes
- Country: Germany
- Languages: Silent; German intertitles

State Attorney Jordan (German: Staatsanwalt Jordan) is a 1926 German silent film directed by Karl Gerhardt and starring Hans Mierendorff, Hedwig Pauly-Winterstein, and Paul Henckels. It was shot at the Weissensee Studios in Berlin. The film's sets were designed by the art directors Ernst Schütte and Erich Zander. It premiered at Berlin's Marmorhaus.

== Cast ==
- Hans Mierendorff as Staatsanwalt Jordan
- Hedwig Pauly-Winterstein as Frau Jordan
- Paul Henckels as Conrad Hecker, Portier
- Hedwig Wangel as Frau Hecker
- Mary Johnson as Hertha Hecker, Tochter
- Alfred Gerasch as Fritz Emmerich, Maler
- Rudolf Klein-Rhoden as Koch, Gastwirt
- Alexander Murski as Der Oberstaatsanwalt
- Bruno Ziener as Vorsitzender
- Albert Patry
- Karl Platen

== See also ==
- State Attorney Jordan (1919 film)

== Bibliography ==
- Grange, William (2008). Cultural Chronicle of the Weimar Republic. Lanham, MD: Scarecrow Press. ISBN 978-0-8108-5967-8.
