= Waves of Life and Love =

1921 film

- Directed by: Lorenz Bätz
- Written by: Olga Alsen; Fern Andra
- Produced by: Georg Bluen
- Starring: Fern Andra; Toni Tetzlaff; Leopold von Ledebur
- Production company: Fern Andra-Film
- Distributed by: Bavaria Film
- Release date: 28 December 1921
- Country: Germany
- Languages: Silent; German intertitles

Waves of Life and Love (German: Des Lebens und der Liebe Wellen) is a 1921 German silent romance film directed by Lorenz Bätz and starring Fern Andra, Toni Tetzlaff and Leopold von Ledebur.

The film's srts were designed by the art director August Rinaldi.

== Cast ==
- Fern Andra
- Toni Tetzlaff
- Leopold von Ledebur
- Margarete Kupfer
- Erling Hanson

== Bibliography ==
- Grange, William. Cultural Chronicle of the Weimar Republic. Scarecrow Press, 2008.
