= The Tigress (1922 film) =

German silent film by Ernst Wendt

- Directed by: Ernst Wendt
- Written by: Max Jungk; Julius Urgiß
- Cinematography: Carl Hoffmann; Gotthardt Wolf
- Production company: John Hagenbeck-Film
- Distributed by: Terra Film
- Release date: 4 January 1922
- Country: Germany
- Languages: Silent; German intertitles

The Tigress (German: Die Tigerin) is a 1922 German silent film directed by Ernst Wendt. The film's art direction was by Franz Schroedter.

== Cast ==
In alphabetical order

- Margit Barnay
- Carl de Vogt
- Charlotte Hagenbruch
- Max Höfler
- Rose Liechtenstein
- Cläre Lotto
- Hermann Picha
- Ortrud Wagner
- Margarethe Weisser-Damm
- Martin Wolfgang
- Toni Zimmerer

== Bibliography ==
- Grange, William (2008). Cultural Chronicle of the Weimar Republic. Lanham, MD: Scarecrow Press. ISBN 978-0-8108-5967-8.
