= Music in the Blood (1934 film) =

1934 film

- Directed by: Erich Waschneck
- Written by: Erich Waschneck
- Starring: Leo Slezak; Hanna Waag; Sybille Schmitz
- Cinematography: Friedl Behn-Grund
- Music by: Clemens Schmalstich
- Production company: Fanal-Filmproduktion
- Distributed by: Europa Film
- Release date: 1 August 1934
- Running time: 87 minutes
- Country: Germany
- Language: German

Music in the Blood (German: Musik im Blut) is a 1934 German drama film directed by Erich Waschneck and starring Leo Slezak, Hanna Waag and Sybille Schmitz. Location shooting took place in Dresden.

== Cast ==
- Leo Slezak as Friedrich Hagedorn, Kapellmeister
- Elsa Wagner as Mathilde, seine Frau
- Hanna Waag as Hanna, seine Tochter
- Sybille Schmitz as Carola, seine Nichte
- Wolfgang Liebeneiner as Hans Peters
- Walter Ladengast as Franz Zahlinger, Korrepetitor
- Alexander Engel as Klinkermann, erster Geiger
- Hans Junkermann as Direktor Gregor
- Willy Kaiser-Heyl as Prof. Forster
- Ernst Behmer as Wittig, Diener
- Berliner Konzert-Verein as Orchestra
- Horst Birr
- Olga Engl
- Trude Haefelin
- Carl Walther Meyer
- Karl Platen
- Klaus Pohl
- Willi Schur
- Franz Stein
- Erika Streithorst
- Isa Vermehren
- Leopold von Ledebur
- Wolfgang von Schwindt
- Gertrud Wolle

== Bibliography ==
- Vande Winkel, Roel; Welch, David, eds. (2007). Cinema and the Swastika: The International Expansion of Third Reich Cinema. Palgrave MacMillan. ISBN 978-1-4039-9491-2.
