= Eva and the Grasshopper =

1927 film directed by Georg Asagaroff

- Directed by: Georg Asagaroff; Wladyslaw Starewicz
- Written by: Robert Reinert; Wilhelm Thiele; Jean de La Fontaine
- Starring: Camilla Horn; Gustav Fröhlich; Warwick Ward
- Cinematography: Carl Hoffmann; Theodor Sparkuhl
- Music by: Werner R. Heymann
- Production company: UFA
- Distributed by: UFA
- Release date: 10 June 1927
- Running time: 113 minutes
- Country: Germany
- Language: Silent (German intertitles)

Eva and the Grasshopper (German: Jugendrausch) is a 1927 German silent drama film directed by Georg Asagaroff and Wladyslaw Starewicz and starring Camilla Horn, Gustav Fröhlich, and Warwick Ward. It was shot at the Tempelhof Studios in Berlin. The film's sets were designed by the art director Erich Czerwonski.

== Cast ==
- Camilla Horn as Camille de Saxe
- Gustav Fröhlich as Armand Noret
- Else Burkhardt
- Warwick Ward as Jacques Vaillant
- Maria Andrejewa
- Rudolf Biebrach
- Bruno Kastner
- Alice Kempen
- Philipp Manning
- Hans Mierendorff
- Karl Platen
- Lydia Potechina
- Robert Scholz
- Gustav Adolf Semler
- Hertha von Walther

== Bibliography ==
- Alfred Krautz. International directory of cinematographers, set- and costume designers in film, Volume 4. Saur, 1984.
