= Edward Kilenyi Jr. =

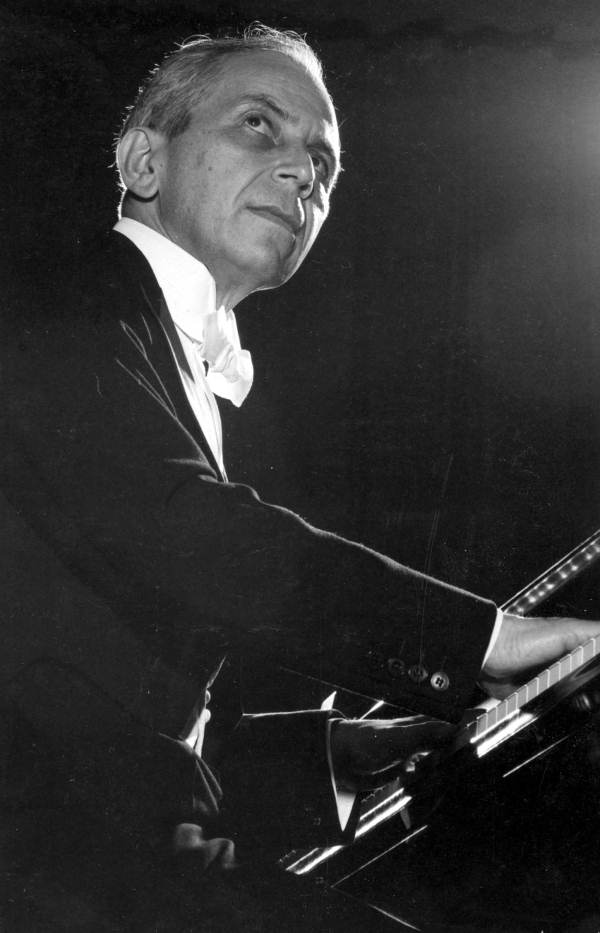
Kilenyi at FSU

Edward Kilenyi Jr. (1910 – 2000) was a classical pianist. He was born in Philadelphia, Pennsylvania on May 7, 1910. Kilenyi studied in Hungary with the composer/pianist Ernő Dohnányi at the Franz Liszt Academy of Music, earning a diploma in 1930. He later became a Professor of Music at Florida State University in Tallahassee, Florida in 1953, four years after Dohnanyi began teaching there. He died on January 6, 2000. A collection of recordings of his concerts is located at the International Piano Archives at the University of Maryland (IPAM).

His father, Edward Kilenyi Sr. (1884 – 1968), also a noted musician, arrived in the United States from Hungary in 1908. Kilenyi Sr. taught music to George Gershwin for five years and wrote music for the Sam Fox Publishing Company and over 40 movies from the 1910s-1940s.
