= Harburger Theater =

Theatre in Hamburg, Germany

Coordinates: 53°27′33″N 9°58′38″E

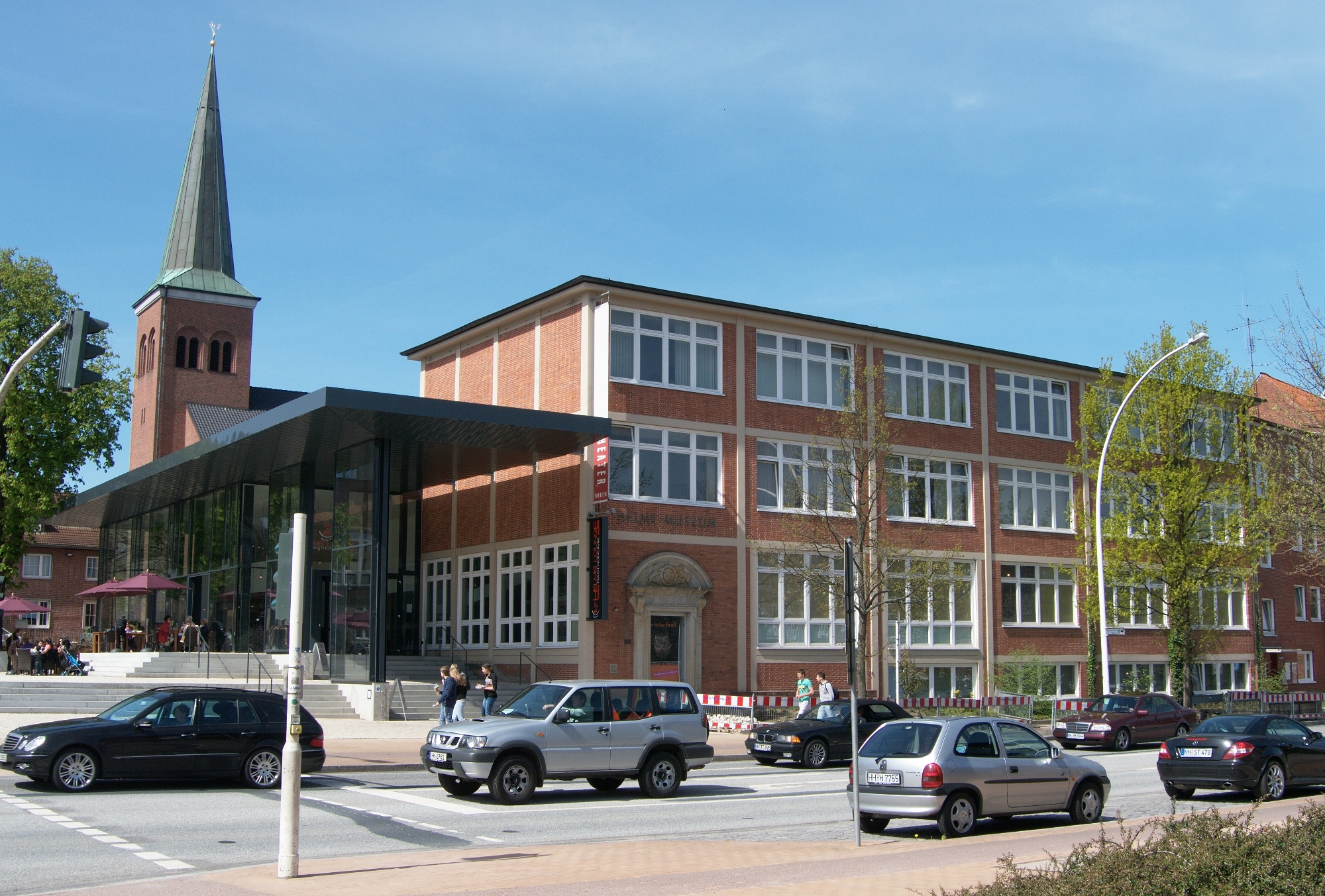
An image of Harburger Theater

Harburger Theater is a theatre in Hamburg, Germany. It showcases classic plays, comedies, modern pieces and musicals. The theater hall is located in the main building of the Hamburg Archaeological Museum (Helms Museum) and the Museumplatz in Harsburg. The head of the theater is Axel Schneider, who also heads the Altona Theater and the Hamburger Kammerspiele. He has been with the Harburger Theater since 2003.

== History ==
The theater was founded in 1893 as the Harburg city theater of what was then the independent city of Harburg (Elbe). During the construction, parts of the previously burnt down Oldenburgische Staatstheater were used. The house on Kerschensteiner Strause was destroyed in 1944 in the World War II bombings. A sports hall was built in the same place in 1961.

After the war ended in 1945, Hans Fitze took over the management of the Städtische Bühne Harburg. When the city of Hamburg decided not to finance the theater any more, Fitze directed the stage as a private theater starting in 1949. While successfully managing the theater, Hans Fitze also took over the management of the Altona Theater in 1954. Both theaters experienced financial problems and closed in 1994.

From 1995 to 2003, the Harburg Theater was performed by the Stadttheater Lüneburg. Then Axel Schneider, who was previously successful at the Altona Theater, also took over the management in Harburg in 2003 and achieved a space utilization of 75% (approximately 1,100 subscribers in 2009).

In 2009, the theater and museum foyer were expanded by a glass porch with cash register and eatery.

== People ==
=== Directors ===
Hans Fitze from 1945 to 1994

=== Actors ===
- Siegfried Arno stage decoration
- Bruno Kastner First engagement around 1910
- Gustav Knuth 1919 to 1922
- Hans Jürgen Diedrich Stage education and actors until 1954
- Kai Möller stage decoration 1920
- Arthur Schröder stage debut in 1910
