= Toni Tetzlaff =

German actress (1871–1947)

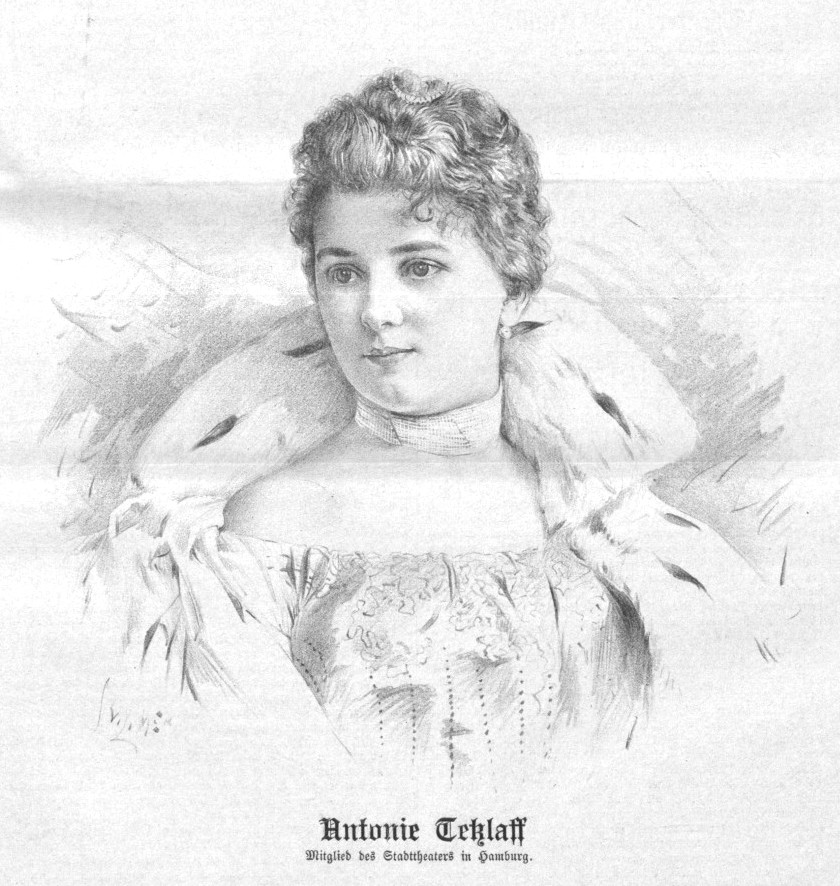
- Tetzlaff in 1897
- Born: Antonie Tetzlaff; 13 March 1871; Mainz, German Empire
- Died: 16 December 1947 (aged 76); Berlin, Allied-occupied Germany
- Occupation: Actress
- Years active: 1915–1947 (film)

Toni Tetzlaff (born Elisabeth Antonie Pauline Tetzlaff; 13 March 1871 – 16 December 1947) was a German stage and film actress.

== Selected filmography ==
- Alkohol (1919)
- Lilli (1919)
- Lilli's Marriage (1919)
- The World Champion (1919)
- Devoted Artists (1919)
- Princess Woronzoff (1920)
- In the Whirl of Life (1920)
- The Adventuress of Monte Carlo (1921)
- Waves of Life and Love (1921)
- Lola Montez, the King's Dancer (1922)
- Louise de Lavallière (1922)
- Should We Get Married? (1925)
- Reluctant Imposter (1925)
- The Ascent of Little Lilian (1925)
- The Three Mannequins (1926)
- Lace (1926)
- Countess Ironing-Maid (1926)
- His Greatest Bluff (1927)
- Heads Up, Charley (1927)
- Love in the Cowshed (1928)
- Panic (1928)
- Immorality (1928)
- When the Mother and the Daughter (1928)
- From a Bachelor's Diary (1929)
- The Woman Everyone Loves Is You (1929)
- Sinful and Sweet (1929)
- Fräulein Else (1929)
- Jenny's Stroll Through Men (1929)
- Hans in Every Street (1930)
- The Woman Without Nerves (1930)
- Busy Girls (1930)
- End of the Rainbow (1930)
- That's All That Matters (1931)
- Queen of the Night (1931)
- Elisabeth of Austria (1931)
- The Concert (1931)
- Waves of Life and Love (1921)
- Spoiling the Game (1932)
- Madame Makes Her Exit (1932)
- So Ended a Great Love (1934)
- I for You, You for Me (1934)
- Playing with Fire (1934)
- The Valiant Navigator (1935)
- Pillars of Society (1935)
- The Castle in Flanders (1936)
- Tomfoolery (1936)
- The Court Concert (1936)
- The Irresistible Man (1937)
- Diamonds (1937)
- Dangerous Game (1937)
- Love Can Lie (1937)
- Serenade (1937)
- A Prussian Love Story (1938)
- What Now, Sibylle? (1938)
- Congo Express (1939)
- The Girl at the Reception (1940)
- No Place for Love (1947)
- The Court Concert (1948)

== Bibliography ==
- Chandler, Charlotte. Marlene: Marlene Dietrich, A Personal Biography. Simon and Schuster, 2011.
