= Tim Bergfelder =

Professor of Film at the University of Southampton

Tim Bergfelder is Professor of Film at the University of Southampton, UK. His interests include film history and industries.

He holds a master's degree and subsequently a PhD in film from the University of East Anglia.

He is a founding member of NECS (Network of European Film and Media Studies) and BAFTSS (British Association of Film Television and Screen Studies), and a member of MeCCSA (Media, Communication, and Cultural Studies Association), and the German GfM (Gesellschaft für Medienwissenschaften).

== Works ==
- The Titanic in myth and memory: representations in visual and literary culture (Tim Bergfelder & Sarah Street, 2004)
- International adventures: German popular cinema and European co-productions in the 1960s (2005)
- Film Architecture and the Transnational Imagination: Set Design in 1930s European Cinema (Tim Bergfelder, Sue Harris & Sarah Street, 2007)
- Destination London: German-speaking émigrés and British cinema, 1925-1950 (Tim Bergfelder & Christian Cargnelli, 2008)
- Concise Cinegraph: the Encyclopedia of German Cinema (Hans-Michael Bock & Tim Bergfelder, eds., 2009)
- Stars and Stardom in Brazilian Cinema (Tim Bergfelder, Lisa Shaw & Joao Luiz Vieira, eds., 2016)
- The German Cinema Book (Tim Bergfelder, Erica Carter, Deniz Göktürk, 1st edition, 2003, 2nd edition (Claudia Sandberg addded), 2020
