= Erik Lund (director) =

German film director (1893–1958)

- Born: Manfred Liebenau; 16 September 1893; Berlin, German Empire
- Died: 13 June 1958 (aged 64); Los Angeles, California, U.S.
- Other name: Frank Lee Williams
- Occupations: Director, Producer
- Years active: 1918–1931
- Spouse: Eva May (m.1918, divorced 1922)

Manfred Liebenau (16 September 1893 – 13 June 1958), known professionally as Erik Lund, was a German film director and producer of the silent era. He was married to the actress Eva May.

== Selected filmography ==
- Sadja (1918)
- The Foolish Heart (1919)
- The Last Sun Son (1919)
- Between Two Worlds (1919)
- Black Pearls (1919)
- The Fairy of Saint Ménard (1919)
- The Bride of the Incapacitated (1919)
- The World Champion (1919)
- Irrlicht (1919)
- The Golden Lie (1919)
- The Heart of Casanova (1919)
- A Man's Word (1919)
- Devoted Artists (1919)
- All Souls (1919)
- The Bodega of Los Cuerros (1919)
- Only a Servant (1919)
- State Attorney Jordan (1919)
- The Enchanted Princess (1919)
- In the Whirl of Life (1920)
- President Barrada (1920)
- Forbidden Love (1920)
- Alfred von Ingelheim's Dramatic Life (1921)
- The Secret of Castle Ronay (1922)
- Dagfin (1926), Production manager
- Die große Attraktion (1931), Production manager

== Bibliography ==
- Ruth Barton. Hedy Lamarr: The Most Beautiful Woman in Film. University Press of Kentucky, 2010.
