= Hugo Landsberger =

German novelist and dramatist

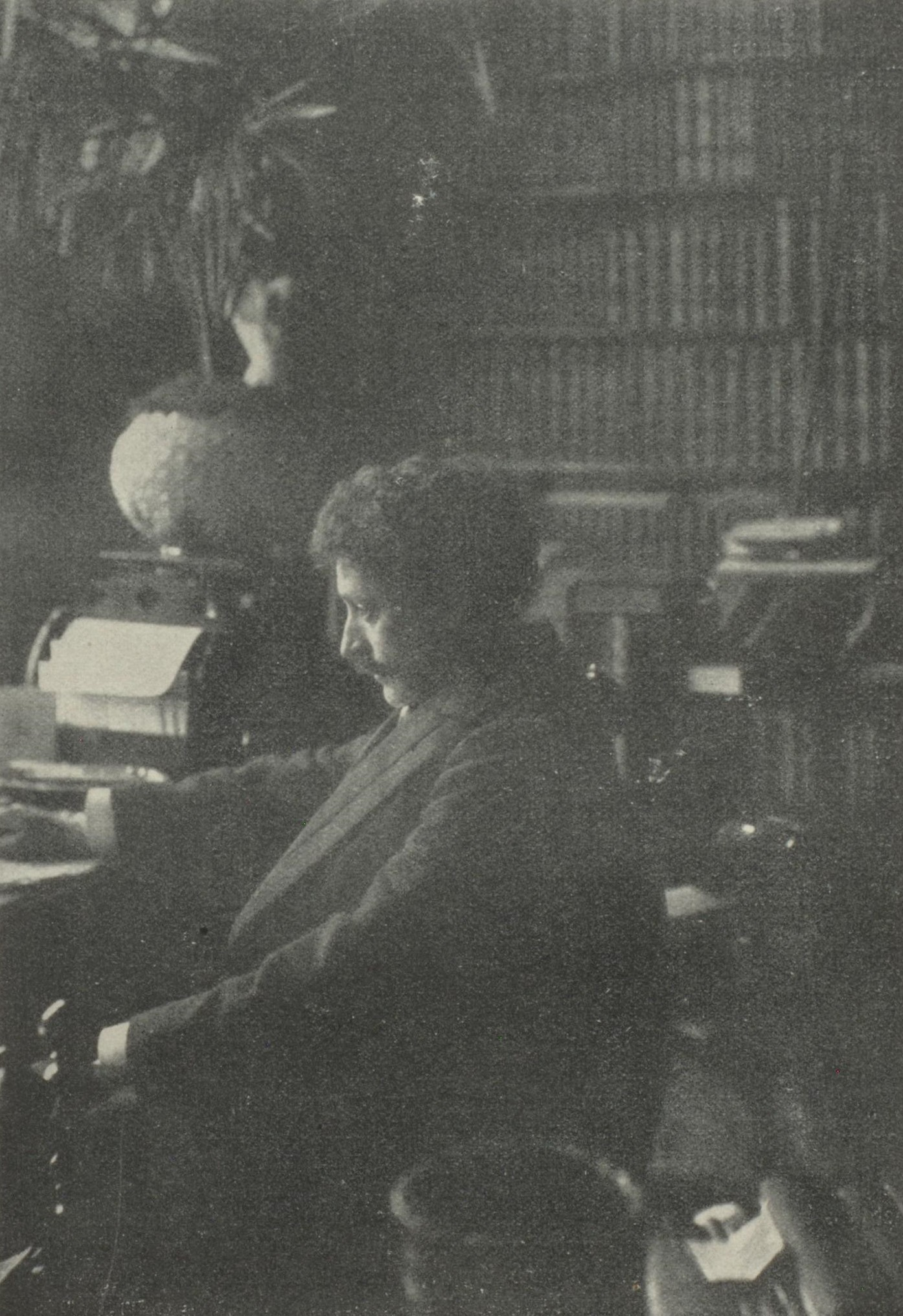
- Born: 25 August 1861; Berlin, Prussia
- Died: 31 August 1939 (aged 78); Berlin, Nazi Germany
- Spouse: Lola Rameau (m. 1901)
- Writing career
- Pen name: Hans Land

Hugo Landsberger (25 August 1861 – 31 August 1939), also known by the pen name Hans Land, was a German novelist, dramatist, and editor.

== Biography ==
Hugo Landsberger was born in Berlin, the son of Rabbi Julius Landsberger, where he attended the Joachimsthalsches Gymnasium. After passing his school-leaving exams, he began a banking apprenticeship, which he abandoned; instead, he studied literature and history at the Universities of Leipzig and Berlin. He was in contact with the workers' movement, and was expelled from the University of Berlin for giving lectures to workers' associations. Landsberger shifted to writing literary works, which he published under the pseudonym "Hans Land" and some of which appeared as preprints in social democratic and syndicalist newspapers. He cultivated connections with the naturalist literary movement (including the Friedrichshagener Dichterkreis) and supported the goals of the Volksbühne. Landsberger had a close friendship with the actor Josef Kainz.

From 1898 to 1901, he edited the weekly journal Das neue Jahrhundert. From 1905 he was a member of the editorial board of Reclams Universal-Bibliothek, and from 1909 to 1911 he was a member of the board of the Freie Volksbühne Berlin.

After Hitler's rise to power, Landsberger, as a Jewish writer interested in social issues, came under fire from the Nazi regime. According to some accounts, he disappeared in around 1935; others say he died in Berlin in 1939 of an enlarged prostate gland.

== Work ==
Landsberger's first production was Der Neue Gott, Roman aus der Gegenwart (Dresden, 1891), which was followed by Sünden (Berlin, 1891). His dramatic efforts thus far have been confined to collaboration with Holländer in the production of Die Heilige Ehe: Ein Modernes Schauspiel in 5 Akten (Berlin, 1893). In that year, also, his first success was made in his novel Die Richterin, of which a sixth edition was called for in the following year. Other works are: Mutterrecht, a novelette; Die Tugendhafte (1895), a humorous story; Um das Weib (1896), a novel of contemporary life; Von Zwei Erlösern; and Schlaagende Wetter (1897), a novel which was issued, with twenty-five illustrations, as part of Kürschner's Bücherschatz; Und Wem Sie Just Passieret (Berlin, 1899); and Liebesopfer (Berlin, 1900).
