= Hans-Michael Bock =

German film historian

Hans-Michael Bock (born 5 July 1947 in Wilhelmshaven, Germany) is a German film historian, filmmaker, translator and writer.

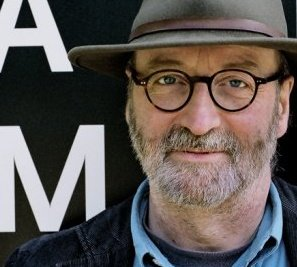
Hans-Michael Bock

== Work ==
Bock is editor of the encyclopaedia CineGraph - Lexikon zum deutschsprachigen Film, a reference work for German language film history published since 1984 by edition text + kritik in Munich as a loose-leaf dictionary, with over 1200 articles about German and German-speaking directors, actors, writers, producers, cinematographers, production designers, technicians and critics. In 2006 The Concise CineGraph a shorter English version was edited by Bock with Tim Bergfelder for Berghahn Books, Oxford and New York.

Bock is co-founder and board member of the research institute CineGraph - Hamburgisches Centrum für Filmforschung which was founded in 1989 by the editors of the CineGraph encyclopaedia in order to intensify research into German film history in the European and transcontinental context.

Bock is also the author and/or editor of numerous publications and book series on German and international film history. Since 1980, he is the general editor of Film verstehen, the German edition of the American classic How to Read a Film by James Monaco. Since 2005, Bock is editor of the book series Film Europa: German Cinema in an International Context, together with Tim Bergfelder (University of Southampton) and Sabine Hake (University of Texas, Austin).

He supervised DVD editions like the Ernst Lubitsch Collection (2006, Transit Classics), The 3 Penny Opera (Die 3-Groschen-Oper) (2008), Klaus Wildenhahn - Dokumentarist im Fernsehen (2010, Die großen Dokumentaristen), and Peter Pewas - Filme 1932-67 (2011). Bock is co-editor of the DVD series cinefest Edition.

Hans-Michael Bock was the author of the first detailed bibliography of the work of the German author Arno Schmidt which was published in 1973 (a second, extended edition was published in 1979). 1978 Bock as the editor started the book series Haidnische Alterthümer - Literatur des 18. und 19. Jahrhunderts. The series published rediscovered forgotten and rare novels of the 18th and 19th centuries, especially titles that Arno Schmidt had recommended in his works.

Also, Bock was working as a translator, i.e. of novels by the American singers and writers Woody Guthrie and Kinky Friedman.

== Publications (selection) ==
- (Editor with Jörg Drews): Der Solipsist in der Heide. Materialien zum Werk Arno Schmidts. Munich (Germany): edition text + kritik 1974, ISBN 978-3-415-00355-2.
- Bibliography Arno Schmidt 1949–1973. Munich (Germany): edition text + kritik 1974, ISBN 978-3-415-00411-5.
- Bibliography Arno Schmidt 1949–1978. 2., enhanced and expanded edition. Munich (Germany): edition text + kritik 1979, ISBN 978-3-88377-020-8. (revised reprint 1980)
- Woody Guthrie: Dieses Land ist mein Land. - Bound for Glory. With drawings by the author and a preface by Studs Terkel. German translation by Hans-Michael Bock. Frankfurt am Main (Germany): Zweitausendeins 1977. (New Edition: Dies Land ist mein Land. Hamburg: 2001. ISBN 978-3-89401-363-9)
- (Editor with Jürgen Berger): Photo: Casparius. Filmgeschichte in Bildern / Berlin um 1930 / Auf Reisen. Berlin/West (Germany): Stiftung Deutsche Kinemathek 1978. Catalogue with additional material about G. W. Pabsts's film adaptation of Die 3-Groschen-Oper nach Kurt Weill und Bertolt Brecht.
- (Editor): CineGraph - Lexikon zum deutschsprachigen Film. Munich (Germany): edition text + kritik since 1984, ISBN 978-3-88377-607-1. loose-leaf.
- (Editor): Über Arno Schmidt. Rezensionen vom "Leviathan" bis zur "Julia". Zurich (Switzerland): Haffmans 1984, ISBN 978-3-251-00031-9.
- (Editor): Paul Leni. Grafik Theater Film. Frankfurt am Main (Germany): Deutsches Filmmuseum 1986, ISBN 978-3-88799-008-4.
- (Editor with Thomas Schreiber): Über Arno Schmidt II. Gesamtdarstellungen. Zurich (Switzerland): Haffmans 1987, ISBN 978-3-251-00117-0.
- (Editor with Michael Töteberg): Das Ufa-Buch. Die internationale Geschichte von Deutschlands grösstem Film-Konzern. Kunst und Krisen - Stars und Regisseure - Wirtschaft und Politik. Frankfurt am Main (Germany): Zweitausendeins 1992, ISBN 978-3-86150-065-0.
- Kinky Friedman: Greenwich Killing Time. Kriminalroman. German translation by Hans-Michael Bock. Zurich (Switzerland): Haffmans 1992. ISBN 978-3-251-01144-5.
- Kinky Friedman: Lone Star. Kriminalroman. German translation by Hans-Michael Bock. Zurich (Switzerland): Haffmans 1993. ISBN 978-3-251-30002-0.
- Kinky Friedman: Elvis, Jesus & Coca-Cola. Kriminalroman. German translation by Hans-Michael Bock. Zurich (Switzerland): Haffmans 1993. ISBN 978-3-251-30051-8.
- (Editor with Wolfgang Jacobsen): Recherche : Film. Quellen und Methoden der Filmforschung. Munich (Germany): edition text + kritik 1997, ISBN 978-3-88377-550-0.
- (Editor): Lexikon Filmschauspieler International. 2 Bände. Reinbek: Rowohlt 1997, ISBN 978-3-499-16523-8, ISBN 978-3-499-16524-5.
- Douglas Sirk: Imitation of Life. Ein Gespräch mit Jon Halliday. German edition by Hans-Michael Bock and Michael Töteberg. Frankfurt am Main (Germany): Verlag der Autoren 1997. ISBN 978-3-88661-176-8.
- Geoffrey Nowell-Smith: Geschichte des internationalen Films. Translated by Hans-Michael Bock and a team of film scholars. Stuttgart, Weimar (Germany): Metzler 1998, ISBN 978-3-476-01585-3.
- (Editor): Lexikon Regisseure und Kameraleute. Reinbek (Germany): Rowohlt 1999, ISBN 978-3-499-60651-9.
- (Compilation with Wiebke Annkatrin Mosel, Ingrun Spazier): Die Tobis 1928–1945. Eine kommentierte Filmografie. Munich (Germany): edition text + kritik 2003, ISBN 978-3-88377-748-1.
- James Monaco: Film verstehen. Kunst, Technik, Sprache, Geschichte und Theorie des Films und der Medien. Mit einer Einführung in Multimedia. New and updated version. German edition by Hans-Michael Bock. Reinbek (Germany): Rowohlt 2009, ISBN 978-3-499-62538-1. (First German publication: 1980).
- (General Editor; Associate Editor: Tim Bergfelder): The Concise CineGraph. Encyclopaedia of German Cinema. New York, Oxford: Berghahn Books 2009, (Film Europa: German Cinema in an International Context), ISBN 978-1-57181-655-9.
- James Monaco, Hans-Michael Bock: Film verstehen. Das Lexikon. Die wichtigsten Fachbegriffe zu Film und Neue Medien. Reinbek: Rowohlt 2011, ISBN 978-3-499-62667-8. (expanded and updated German edition of: James Monaco: The Dictionary of New Media).

== Films ==
- 1972. Fritz Rasp erzählt. TV documentary. Together with Rudolf Körösi. (available as an extra on the DVD The 3 Penny Opera Criterion Collection)
- 1972. 18 Bilder mit der Hand. Kameramänner des deutschen Stummfilms. TV documentary. Together with Rudolf Körösi.
- 1985. Tabus von Vorgestern. TV documentary. Realisation under the pseudonym Werner Goldmann.
- 1989. Das Cabinet des Erich Pommer. Ein Produzent macht Filmgeschichte. TV documentary. Together with Ute T. Schneider.
- 1997. Der komische Kintopp. Frühe deutsche Komödien. TV series, 6 episodes. Compilation of short movies 1908–1919.
