= The Dancer Barberina =

1920 film directed by Carl Boese

- German: Die Tänzerin Barberina
- Directed by: Carl Boese
- Written by: Adolf Paul
- Starring: Lyda Salmonova; Otto Gebühr; Harry Liedtke
- Cinematography: Mutz Greenbaum
- Production company: Primus Film
- Release date: 2 April 1920
- Country: Germany
- Languages: Silent; German intertitles

The Dancer Barberina (German: Die Tänzerin Barberina) is a 1920 German silent historical drama film directed by Carl Boese and starring Lyda Salmonova, Otto Gebühr, and Harry Liedtke. Part of the group of Prussian films of the Weimar and Nazi eras, it portrays the relationship between Frederick the Great and the dancer Barberina Campanini in eighteenth century Prussia. Gebühr starred as Frederick in another film on the subject, The Dancer of Sanssouci (1932).

The film's sets were designed by the art director Ernst Stern.

== Cast ==
- Lyda Salmonova as Tänzerin Barberina Campanini
- Otto Gebühr as Friedrich II
- Harry Liedtke as dance teacher Fossano
- Reinhold Schünzel as Prince von Carignan
- Rosa Valetti as Frau Campanini
- Julius Falkenstein as Argenson
- Paul Hartmann as Sohn von Lord Stuart
- Giorgio de Giorgetti as King Louis XV of France
- Paul Czimeg as Kammerdiener Friedr. Michaelis
- Franz Groß as Bachelier, Kammerdiener
- Grete Hollmann as Crichton's daughter
- Ludwig Rex as Reeder Josuah Crichton
- Max Ruhbeck as Lord Stuart
- Emil Stammer
