= The Great King =

1942 film

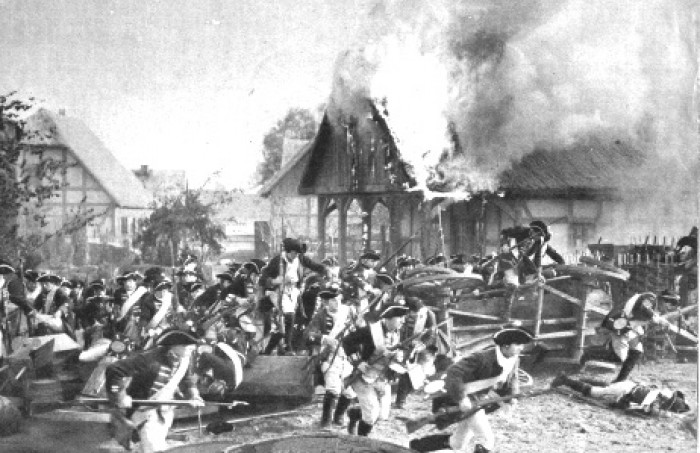
- Directed by: Veit Harlan
- Written by: Veit Harlan; Gerhard Menzel; Hans Rehberg
- Starring: Otto Gebühr
- Cinematography: Bruno Mondi
- Edited by: Friedrich Karl von Puttkamer
- Production company: Tobis Film
- Distributed by: Deutsche Filmvertriebs
- Release date: 3 March 1942
- Running time: 118 minutes
- Country: Nazi Germany
- Language: German
- Budget: 4.779 million ℛℳ
- Box office: 6 million ℛℳ

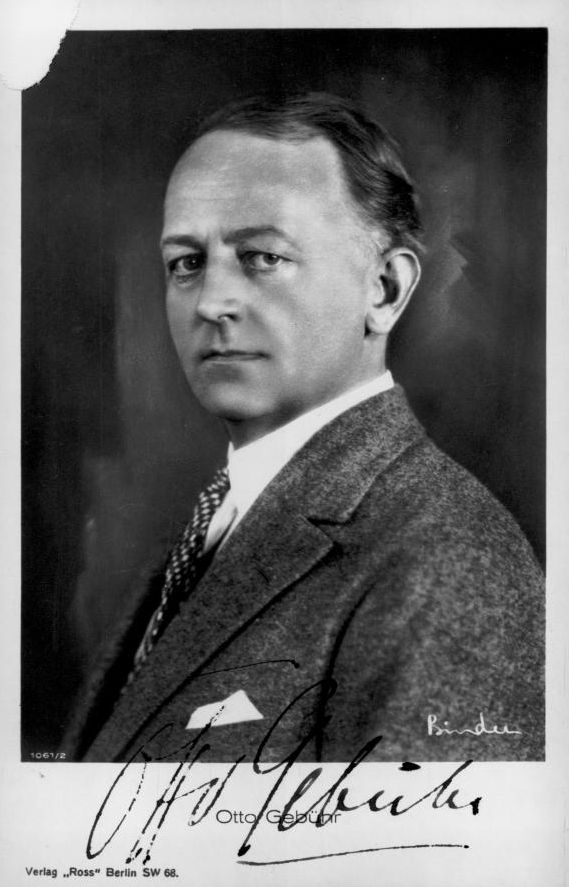
Otto Gebühr played Frederick the Great in 16 films.

The Great King (German: Der große König) is a 1942 German drama film directed by Veit Harlan and starring Otto Gebühr. It depicts the life of Frederick the Great, who ruled Prussia from 1740 to 1786. It received the rare "Film of the Nation" distinction. It was part of a popular cycle of "Prussian films".

The film is a depiction of the Führerprinzip. The analogy to Adolf Hitler was so clear that Hitler sent a print to Benito Mussolini, and Joseph Goebbels warned against the drawing of the comparison in print, in particular, because of the pessimistic mood that opens the film. After a sergeant gives an unauthorised order, the king orders him simultaneously promoted and punished. His later decision to desert results in his death because no disobedience is justified. Goebbels declared that the parallels were not a matter of propaganda, but an obvious result of the parallels of history.

Goebbels also regarded it as instructive that current sufferings would be a source of strength. Goebbels had some difficulty with the Army High Command over this film because it depicted the king as being left in the lurch by his generals. He complained that the army felt that any depiction, however historical, reflected badly on them.

== Cast ==
- Otto Gebühr as Frederick II.
- Kristina Söderbaum as Luise Treskow
- Gustav Fröhlich as Treskow
- Hans Nielsen as Niehoff
- Paul Wegener as General Czernitscheff
- Paul Henckels as Grenadier Spiller
- Elisabeth Flickenschildt as Spiller's Wife
- Kurt Meisel as Alfons
- Hilde Körber as Elisabeth Christine
- Claus Clausen as Prince Henry the Older
- Klaus Detlef Sierck as Prince Henry the Younger
- Herbert Hübner as Count Finkenstein
- Otto F. Henning as General von Finken
- Reginald Pasch as General Manteufel
- Otto Graf as General Seydlitz
- Heinrich Schroth as General Balthasar Rudolf von Schenckendorf
- Leopold von Ledebur as General von Retzow

== Production ==
Frederick the Great was previously adapted into film for propaganda usage in The Hymn of Leuthen by future Reich Chamber of Film president Carl Froelich, The Old and the Young King, and Fridericus. The Great King was commissioned by Joseph Goebbels, who later ordered multiple scenes to be rewritten. It served to advance and support the idea of total war. It was one of the most expensive films produced in the Nazi era. It cost 4,799,000 ℛℳ (equivalent to $20,119,544 in 2021) to produce. Veit Harlan wrote and directed.

== Release ==
The Great King was meant to premiere on 30 January 1942, but was postponed. It was approved by the censors on 28 February, and premiered in Berlin on 3 March to an audience of wounded soldiers and armaments workers. Otto Gebühr was elevated to Staatsschauspieler by Goebbels. It earned 6 million ℛℳ (equivalent to $25,154,671 in 2021) at the box office for a profit of 343,000 ℛℳ (equivalent to $1,438,009 in 2021).

== Awards ==
- Director Veit Harlan won the Mussolini Cup for Best Foreign Film at the 1942 Venice Film Festival.

== Works cited ==
- Niven, Bill (2018). Hitler and Film: The Führer's Hidden Passion. Yale University Press. ISBN 9780300200362.
- Noack, Frank (2016) [2000]. Veit Harlan: "des Teufels Regisser" [Veit Harlan: The Life and Work of a Nazi Filmmaker]. Lexinton: University Press of Kentucky. ISBN 9780813167008.
- Welch, David (1983). Propaganda and the German Cinema: 1933-1945. I.B. Tauris. ISBN 9781860645204.
