= The Old Song =

1930 film

- Directed by: Erich Waschneck
- Written by: Willi Frank
- Starring: Lil Dagover; Lien Deyers; Igo Sym
- Cinematography: Friedl Behn-Grund
- Edited by: Hanne Kuyt
- Music by: Giuseppe Becce
- Production company: Lola Kreutzberg Film
- Release date: 16 October 1930
- Country: Germany
- Language: German

The Old Song (German: Das alte Lied) is a 1930 German drama film directed by Erich Waschneck and starring Lil Dagover, Lien Deyers, and Igo Sym. The film's sets were designed by the art directors Heinz Fenchel and Jacek Rotmil.

== Cast ==
- Lil Dagover as Baronin Eggedy
- Lien Deyers as Annerl Haslinger
- Igo Sym as Hans von Langen
- Paul Hörbiger as Xandel
- Gustav Rickelt
- Felix Bressart as Jacques
- Maria Forescu
- Lucie Euler as Frau Treutelbach
- Martin Kettner
- Bob Stoll as Bob
- Franz Scharwenka
- Alwin Neuß
- Gyula Szőreghy
- Mikhail Rasumny
- Alvin Neuss
- Ida Wüst

== Bibliography ==
- Bock, Hans-Michael; Bergfelder, Tim, eds. (2009). The Concise Cinegraph: Encyclopaedia of German Cinema. New York: Berghahn Books. ISBN 978-1-57181-655-9.
