= Lil Dagover =

German actress (1887–1980)

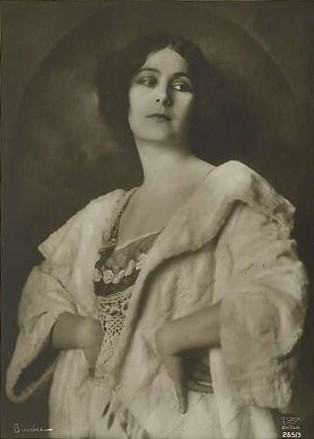
- Dagover in 1919, photo by Alexander Binder
- Born: Marie Antonia Siegelinde Martha Seubert; 30 September 1887; Madiun, Java, Dutch East Indies
- Died: 23 January 1980 (aged 92); Munich, West Germany
- Occupation: Actress
- Years active: 1913–1979
- Spouses: Fritz Daghofer (m. 1907; div. 1919) Georg Witt (m. 1926; died 1973)
- Children: Eva Marie Daghofer (1909–1982)

Lil Dagover (German: [lil ˈdaː.ɡo.vɐ]; born Marie Antonia Siegelinde Martha Seubert; 30 September 1887 – 23 January 1980) was a German actress whose film career spanned from 1913 to 1979. She was a popular film actress in the Weimar Republic.

== Early life ==
Lil Dagover was born Marie Antonia Siegelinde Martha Seubert in Madiun, Java, Dutch East Indies (now Indonesia) to German parents. Some sources inaccurately give her birth name as Marta Maria Lillits. Her father, Adolf Karl Ludwig Moritz Seubert, born in Karlsruhe/Baden Germany, was a forest ranger in the service of the Dutch colonial authorities. She had two siblings. Her mother died in 1897, after which she returned to Germany, where she lived with relatives in Tübingen. She was educated at boarding schools in Baden-Baden, Weimar, and Geneva, Switzerland.

Orphaned at the age of 13, she spent the rest of her adolescence with friends and relatives. After completing her education she began pursuing a career as a stage actress around the principal cities of Europe. In 1907 she married actor Fritz Gustav Josef Daghofer, who was fifteen years her senior. The couple had a daughter, Eva (born 1909) but divorced a decade later, in 1919. Eva married Hungarian director Géza von Radványi in 1930.

Seubert began using a variant of her husband's surname as a professional moniker – changing the spelling of "Daghofer" to "Dagover".

== Acting career in the Weimar Republic ==
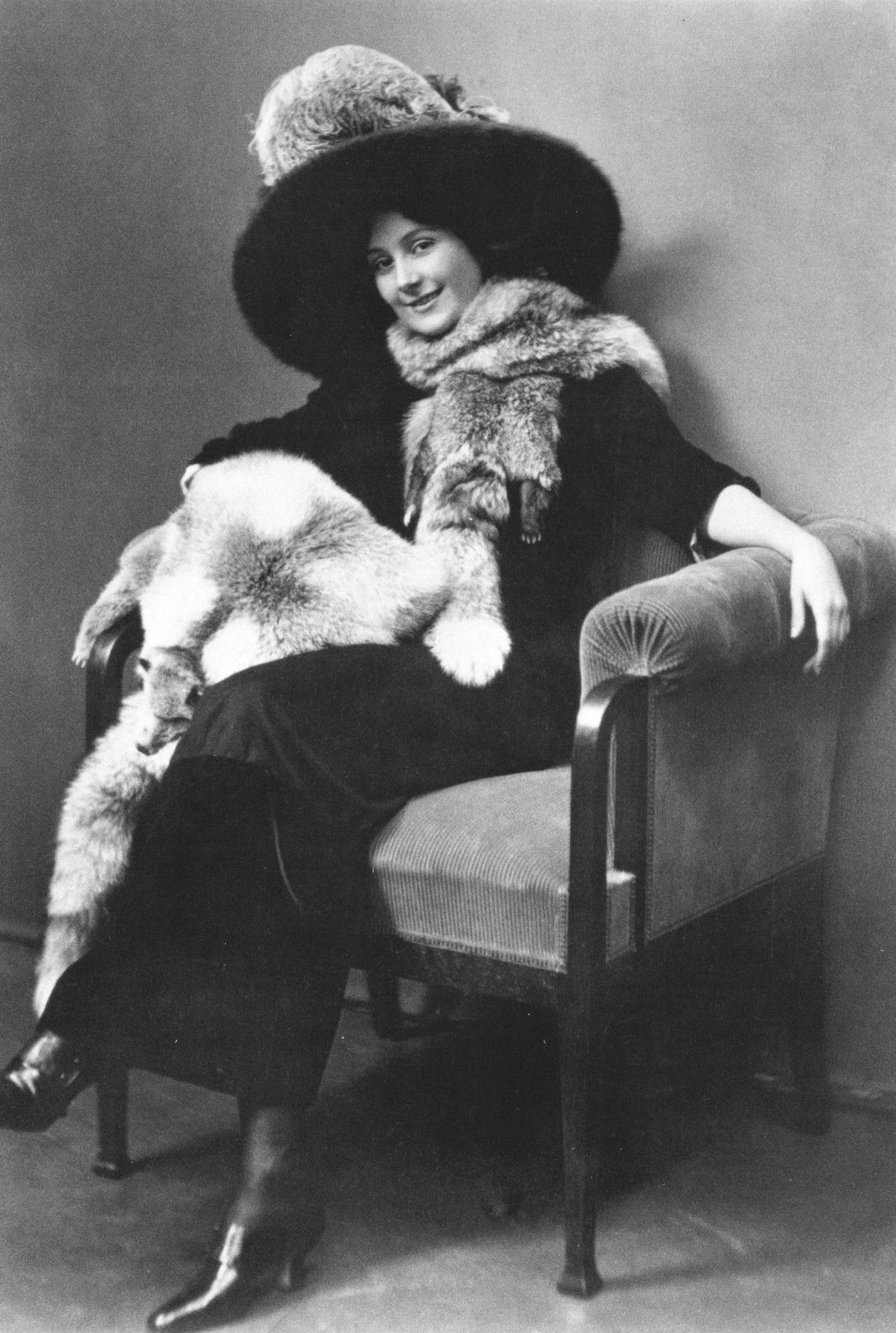
Lil Dagover c. 1912−13

Lil Dagover made her screen debut in a 1913 film by director Louis Held. During her marriage to Fritz Daghofer, she was introduced to several notable film directors; among them Robert Wiene and Fritz Lang. Lang cast Dagover in the role of O-Take-San in the 1919 exotic drama Harakiri which proved to be Dagover's breakout role. The same year, she was directed by Robert Wiene in the German Expressionist horror classic Das Kabinett des Doktor Caligari, from a script by Carl Mayer and Hans Janowitz opposite actors Werner Krauss and Conrad Veidt. Lang directed Dagover in three more films: 1919's Die Spinnen (English title: Spiders), 1921's Der müde Tod (English release titles: Destiny and Behind The Wall), and 1922's Dr. Mabuse, der Spieler.

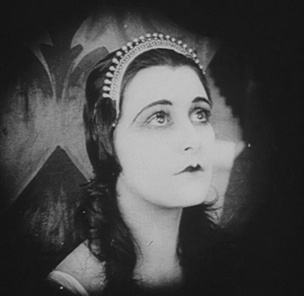
Lil Dagover as the character Jane Olsen in the film The Cabinet of Dr. Caligari (1920)

By the early 1920s, Dagover was one of the most popular and recognized film actresses in the Weimar Republic, appearing in motion pictures by such prominent directors as F. W. Murnau, Lothar Mendes and Carl Froelich. In 1925 she made her stage debut under the direction of Max Reinhardt. In the following years she played in Reinhardt’s Deutsches Theater in Berlin and also at the Salzburg Festival. In 1926 she married film producer Georg Witt, who produced many of Dagover's future films. The couple remained married until Witt's death in 1973.

Lil Dagover's film career in German cinema through the 1920s was prolific, making over forty films and appearing opposite such actors as Emil Jannings, Nils Olaf Chrisander, Willy Fritsch, Lya De Putti, Bruno Kastner and Xenia Desni. She also made several films in Sweden for directors Olof Molander and Gustaf Molander and appeared in several French silent films – her last film appearance of the 1920s was in the 1929 Henri Fescourt-directed French silent film Monte Cristo opposite Jean Angelo and Marie Glory.

== Talkies and the Third Reich ==
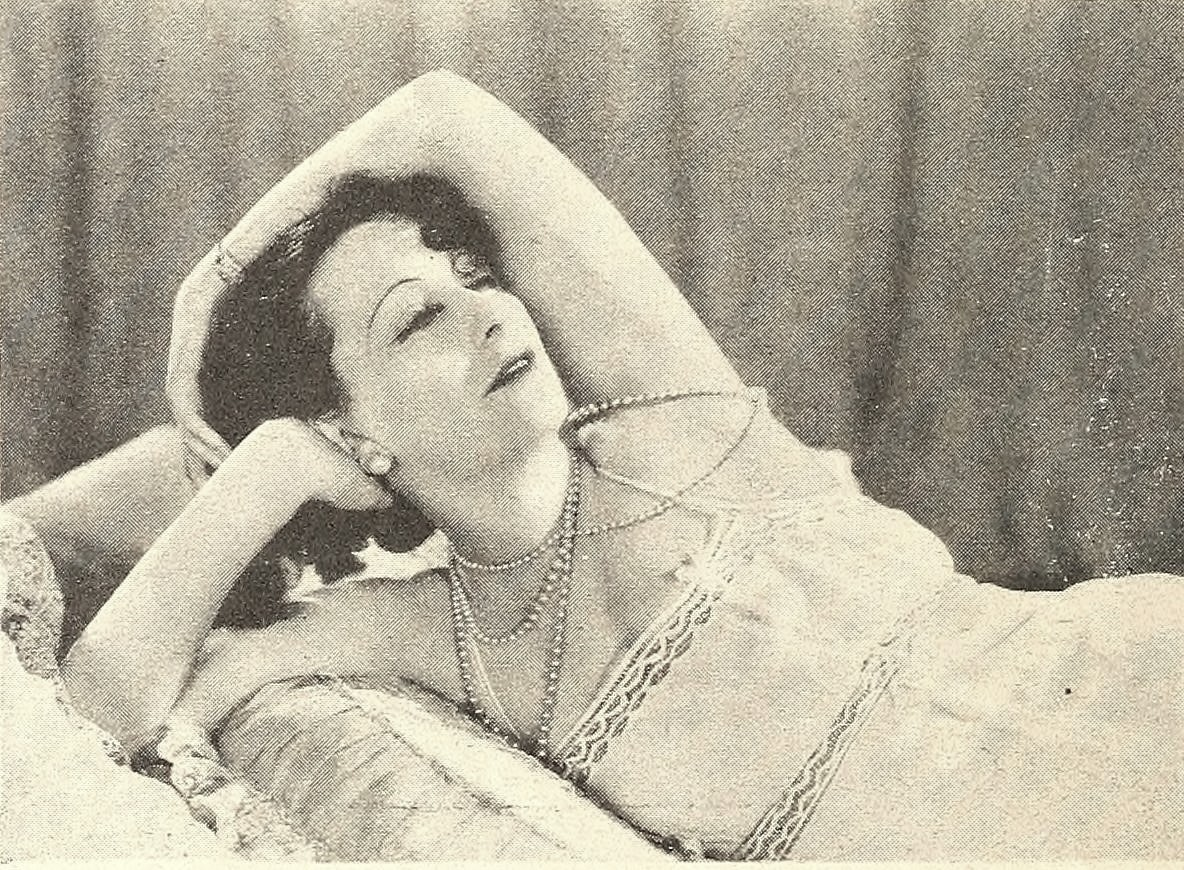
Lil Dagover photographed by Elmer Fryer, May 1932

With the advent of talkies, Lil Dagover ceased making foreign films and appeared only in German productions; with the exception of one English language American film, the Michael Curtiz-directed drama The Woman from Monte Carlo (1932) with actor Walter Huston, shot on location in the United States.

After her return to Germany and the rise of the Third Reich in 1933, she avoided overt political involvement and generally appeared in popular costume musicals and comedies during World War II. However, in 1937, she received the State Actress award, and in 1944 she was awarded the War Merits Cross for entertaining Wehrmacht troops on the Eastern Front in 1943 and on the German occupied Channel Islands of Jersey and Guernsey in 1944.

While Dagover's films of the period were decidedly apolitical, she was known to be one of Adolf Hitler's favorite film actresses and Dagover is known to have been a dinner guest of Hitler's on several occasions.

== Later career ==
After the defeat of Nazi Germany, Dagover continued to appear in West German films. In 1948, she starred in the anti-Nazi drama Gaspary's Sons. The film follows the disintegration of a German family living under National Socialism. Dagover's most internationally popular film of the post-WWII era is the 1959 Alfred Weidenmann-directed adaptation of the 1901 Thomas Mann novel Buddenbrooks.

In 1960, Dagover began appearing in numerous West German television roles in addition to continuing to perform in film. In 1973 she starred in the Academy Award-nominated and Golden Globe-winner for Best Foreign-Language Foreign Film of 1973, The Pedestrian. The film was directed by Austrian actor-director Maximilian Schell, and featured international former early silent film peers Peggy Ashcroft, Käthe Haack, Elisabeth Bergner, Elsa Wagner and Françoise Rosay.

Dagover's last film role was at age 91 in the 1979 Maximilian Schell-directed and produced drama motion picture Tales from the Vienna Woods.

== Death and legacy ==
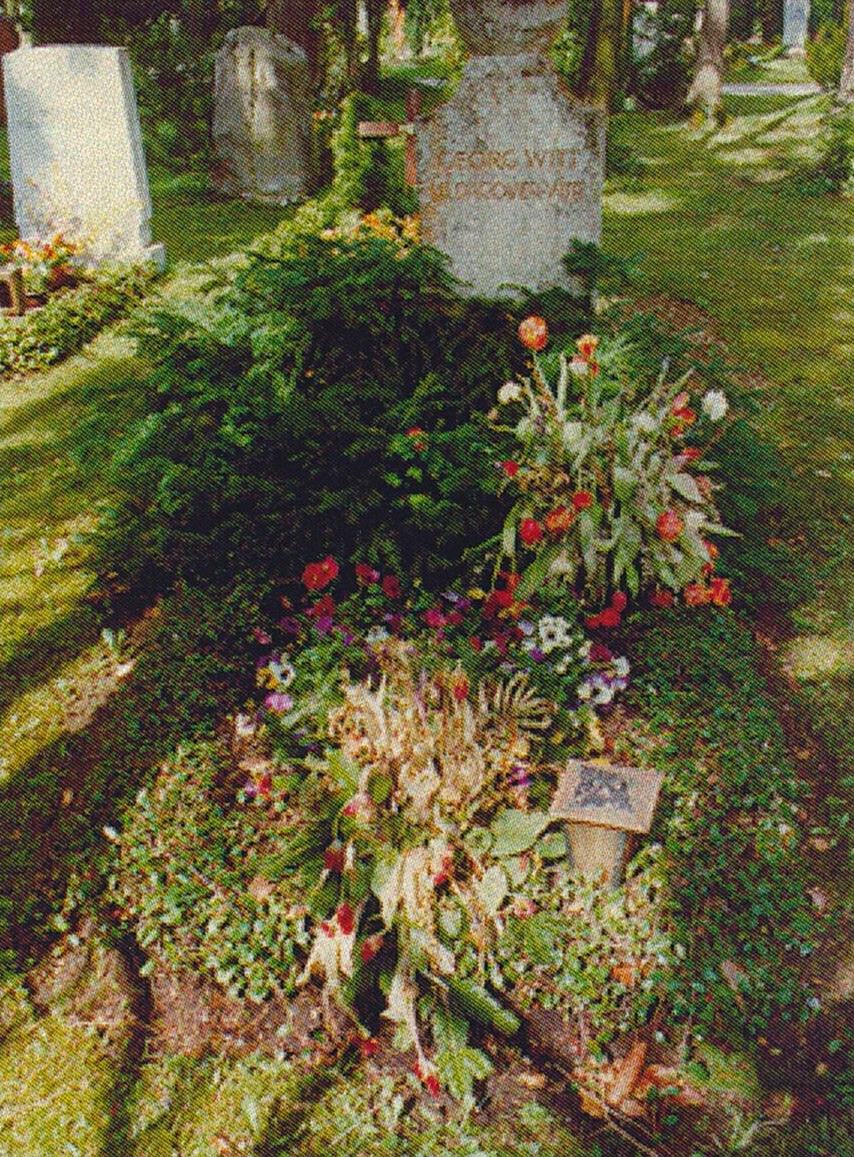
Grave of Lil Dagover and husband Georg Witt at the Waldfriedhof Grünwald cemetery in Grünwald

In 1962, Lil Dagover was awarded the Bundesfilmpreis. In 1964, she was awarded the Bambi annual television and media award from Hubert Burda Media, and the Cross of Merit of the Federal Republic of Germany in 1967. In 1979, she published her autobiography, Ich war die Dame (English: I Was The Lady). Dagover died at the age of 92, on 24 January 1980, in Munich, Bavaria, West Germany, and was buried at the Waldfriedhof Grünwald cemetery, near Munich.

== Filmography ==
- Die Retterin (1916) *Credited as Martha Daghofer
- Clown Charly (1917) *Credited as Martha Daghofer
- Das Rätsel der Stahlkammer (1917) *Credited as Martha Daghofer
- Lebendig tot (1918)
- Der Volontär (1918)
- The Song of the Mother (1918) *Credited as Martha Daghofer
- Bettler GmbH (1919)
- The Mask (1919)
- The Spiders (1919), as Sonnenpriesterin Naela
- The Dancer (1919), as Mutter Rellnow
- Harakiri (1919), as O-Take-San
- Phantome des Lebens (1919)
- Revenge Is Mine (1919)
- The Cabinet of Dr. Caligari (1920), as Jane Olsen
- Spiritismus (1920)
- The Woman in Heaven (1920), as Tatjana
- The Hunt for Death (1920–1921, part 1, 2, 3), as Tänzerin Malatti
- The Mayor of Zalamea (1920), as Isabel
- The Blood of the Ancestors (1920), as Fürstin Wanda Lubowiczka
- The Kwannon of Okadera (1920), as Kwannon
- The Eyes of the Mask (1920)
- The Secret of Bombay (1921), as Die Tänzerin Farnese
- Island of the Dead (1921)
- The Medium (1921)
- Destiny (1921), as Young Woman / Das junge Mädchen / Zobeide / Monna Fiametta / Tiao Tsien
- Murders in the Greenstreet (1921)
- Dr. Mabuse: The Gambler (1922) (uncredited)
- Luise Millerin (1922), as Luise Millerin
- Power of Temptation (1922)
- Phantom (1922), as Marie Starke
- Lowlands (1923), as Martha
- Princess Suwarin (1923), as Tina Bermonte
- His Wife, The Unknown (1923), as Eva
- Comedy of the Heart (1924), as Gerda Werska
- Chronicles of the Gray House (1925), as Bärbe
- The Humble Man and the Chanteuse (1925), as Toni Seidewitz
- Tartuffe (1925), as Elmire, Orgon's wife
- Wenn die Filmkleberin gebummelt hat (1925)
- The Brothers Schellenberg (1926), as Esther
- Love is Blind (1926), as Diane
- The Violet Eater (1926), as Melitta von Arthof
- Only a Dancing Girl (1926), as Marie Berner - varieté dansös
- His English Wife (1927), as Cathleen Paget, née Brock
- Orient Express (1927), as Beate von Morton
- Attorney for the Heart (1927), as June Orchard
- The Maelstrom of Paris (1928), as Lady Amiscia Abenston
- The Secret Courier (1928), as Mme. Thérèse de Renal
- Hungarian Rhapsody (1928), as Camilla
- La grande passion (1928), as Sonia de Blick
- Marriage (1929)
- Monte Cristo (1929), as Mercédès / Comtesse de Morcerf
- Hungarian Nights (1929), as Coraly Rekoczi
- The Favourite of Schonbrunn (1929), as Empress Maria Theresa
- The Ring of the Empress (1930), as Catherine the Great
- The White Devil (1930), as Nelidowa
- There Is a Woman Who Never Forgets You (1930), as Tilly Ferrantes
- Va Banque (1930), as Miss Harriet Williams
- The Old Song (1930), as Baronin Eggedy
- Boycott (1930), as Mrs. Haller
- Die große Sehnsucht (1930), as Herself, Lil Dagover
- The Case of Colonel Redl (1931), as Vera Nikolayevna
- Elisabeth of Austria (1931), as Elisabeth of Austria
- The Congress Dances (1931), as The Countess
- Madame Bluebeard (1931), as Frau Erika Dankwarth
- The Woman from Monte Carlo (1932), as Lottie Corlaix
- The Dancer of Sanssouci (1932), as Barberina Campanini
- Thea Roland (1932), as Thea Roland
- Johannisnacht (1933), as Lisa Lers
- The Fugitive from Chicago (1934), as Eveline
- A Woman Who Knows What She Wants (1934), as Mona Cavallini
- I Marry My Wife (1934), as Lisa Behmer
- The Bird Seller (1935), as Electress
- Lady Windermere's Fan (1935), as Mrs. Erlynne
- The Higher Command (1935), as Madame Martin
- Augustus the Strong (1936), as Countess Aurore Königsmark
- Final Accord (1936), as Charlotte Garvenberg
- The Girl Irene (1936), as Jennifer Lawrence
- Fridericus (1937), as Marquise de Pompadour
- The Kreutzer Sonata (1937), as Jelaina Posdnyschew
- Strife Over the Boy Jo (1937), as Leonine Brackwieser
- Mystery About Beate (1938), as Beate Kaiserling
- Triad (1938), as Cornelia Contarini
- Maja zwischen zwei Ehen (1938), as Maja
- The Stars Shine (1938), as Herself
- Detours to Happiness (1939), as Hanna Bracht
- Friedrich Schiller (1940), as Franziska von Hohenheim
- Bismarck (1940), as Empress Eugénie
- The Little Residence (1942), as Herzogin von Lauffenburg
- Vienna 1910 (1943), as Maria Anschütz
- Music in Salzburg (1944), as Ursula Sanden
- Gaspary's Sons (1948), as Margot von Korff
- Don't Play with Love (1949), as Florentine Alvensleben
- A Day Will Come (1950), as Mme. Mombour
- Chased by the Devil (1950), as Frau Dakar
- The Secret of the Mountain Lake (1952), as Lamberta
- Red Roses, Red Lips, Red Wine (1953), as Gräfin Waldenberg
- His Royal Highness (1953), as Gräfin Löwenjoul
- Hubertus Castle (1954), as Baronin Kleesberg
- I Know What I'm Living For (1955), as Alice Lechaudier
- The Fisherman from Heiligensee (1955), as Baronin Hermine von Velden
- Roses in Autumn (1955), as Mrs. von Briest
- The Barrings (1955), as Thilde von Barring
- Crown Prince Rudolph's Last Love (1956), as Empress Elisabeth
- My Sixteen Sons (1956), as Frau Senator Giselius
- Confessions of Felix Krull (1957)
- Beneath the Palms on the Blue Sea (1957), as Contessa Celestina Morini
- The Buddenbrooks (1959, part 1, 2), as Elisabeth Buddenbrook
- The Strange Countess (1961), as Lady Leonora Moron
- Hotel Royal (1969, TV film), as The Maharani
- The Pedestrian (1973), as Frau Eschenlohr
- Karl May (1974), as Bertha von Suttner
- Memento Mori (1975, TV film), as Charmian Colston
- Tatort (1975, Episode: "Wodka Bitter-Lemon"), as Koenen's Mother
- End of the Game (1975), as Gastmann's Mother
- The Standard (1977), as Archduchess
- Tales from the Vienna Woods (1979), as Helene (final film role)
