= Antonio Rinaldi =

Antonio Rinaldi may refer to:

- Antonio Rinaldi (architect) (1710–1794), Italian architect who worked mainly in Russia
- Antonio Rinaldi (choreographer) (c. 1715 – c. 1759), Italian choreographer who worked in Russia
- Antonio Rinaldi (cinematographer) (active 1965–1972), Italian cinematographer and camera operator
