= Trude von Molo =

Austrian actress

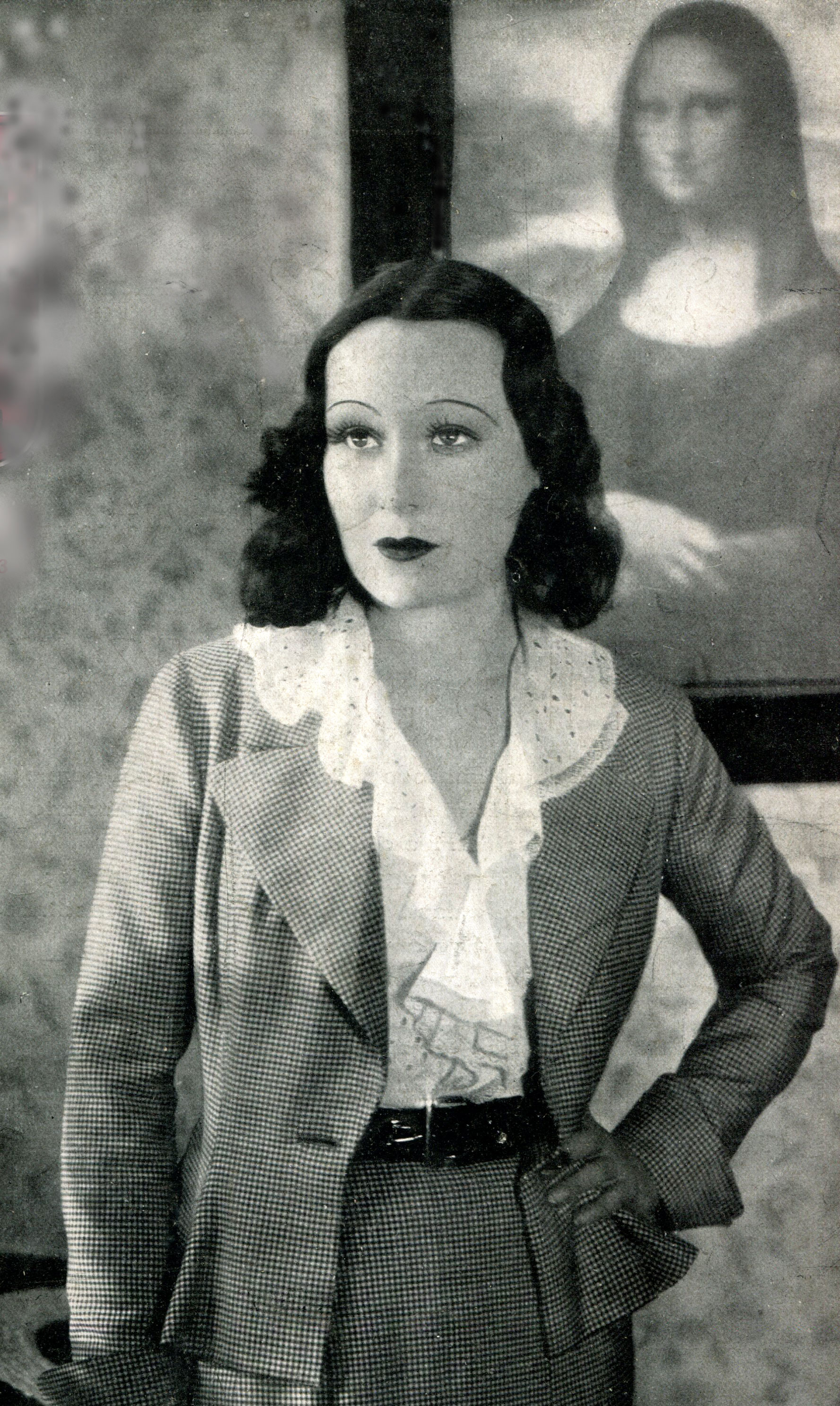
- Born: 22 December 1906; Vienna, Austro-Hungarian Empire
- Died: 27 November 1989 (aged 82); Paris, France
- Occupation: Actress
- Years active: 1930–1933

Trude von Molo (22 December 1906 – 27 November 1989) was an Austrian film actress. She was the daughter of the writer Walter von Molo and the twin sister of Conrad von Molo. Von Molo attended the Max Reinhardt training school. She emerged as a leading actress of German cinema in the early 1930s, but then retired and emigrated to Latin America. In 1947 she returned to Paris, France, where she liked to visit the castle of Corbilly in Arthon, and began spending her time painting. She died in Paris in 1989.

Her American debut was in the German film, The Theft of the Mona Lisa (1931), which played in the United States.

== Selected filmography ==
- Ludwig II, King of Bavaria (1929)
- Cadets (1931)
- The Theft of the Mona Lisa (1931)
- The Man Who Murdered (1931)
- The White Demon (1932)
- The Invisible Front (1932)
- The Marathon Runner (1933)

== Bibliography ==
- Youngkin, Stephen. The Lost One: A Life of Peter Lorre. University Press of Kentucky, 2005.
- Weniger, Kay (2011). "Trude von Molo (1906-1989)". 'Es wird im Leben dir mehr genommen als gegeben ...' Lexikon der aus Deutschland und Österreich emigrierten Filmschaffenden 1933 bis 1945: Eine Gesamt bersicht. ACABUS Verlag. ISBN 9783862820498.
- Trude von Molo at IMDb
- https://www.trudevonmolo-artistepeintredegenrefeminin.com
