= Otto Gebühr =

German actor (1877–1954)

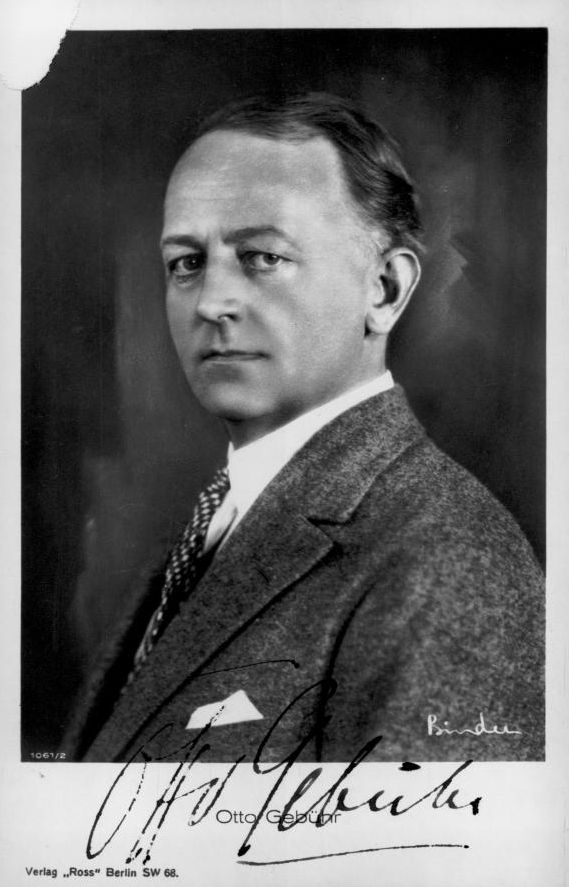
- Born: 29 May 1877; Kettwig, Rhine Province, Kingdom of Prussia
- Died: 13 March 1954 (aged 76); Wiesbaden, Hesse, West Germany
- Occupation: Film actor
- Years active: 1917–1954

Otto Gebühr (29 May 1877 – 13 March 1954) was a German theatre and film actor, who appeared in 102 films released between 1917 and 1954. He is noted for his performance as the Prussian king Frederick the Great in numerous films.

== Early life ==
Born in Kettwig (today part of Essen) in the Rhine Province, the son of a merchant, Gebühr attended the gymnasium secondary school in Cologne and completed a commercial training. Alongside he took drama lessons and began his acting career at the Görlitz city theatre. In 1898 he joined the ensemble of the Königliches Hoftheater Dresden and from 1908 performed at the Lessing Theater in Berlin. As a World War I volunteer he achieved the rank of a Lieutenant in the German Army. He died 13 March 1954 in Wiesbaden.

== Film career ==
After the war, he worked with director Max Reinhardt at the Deutsches Theater in Berlin. At the same time, he obtained his first film performances with the help of his colleague Paul Wegener. He found the role of his lifetime in 1919, acting as King Frederick II in the historical drama The Dancer Barberina directed by Carl Boese, modeled on the life of ballerina Barbara Campanini (1721–1799). The first part of the UFA Fridericus Rex tetralogy starring Otto Gebühr playing the title role was released in 1922, followed by several further so-called "Fridericus-Rex-movies". The series was heavily criticized by contemporaries for supporting a widespread negative stance towards the Weimar Republic democracy and the yearning for a leader in waiting. Gebühr continued his performances in the Nazi period from 1933 onwards, last performing as Frederick in The Great King (German: Der Große König), a 1942 German wartime propaganda film directed by Veit Harlan referring to the historic Miracle of the House of Brandenburg, which received the rare "Film of the Nation" distinction.

Gebühr died at Wiesbaden in 1954.

== Filmography ==
- Die Vase der Semirames (1918)
- Sündiges Blut (1919)
- Verrat und Sühne (1919)
- The Girl from Acker Street (1920)
- Der Menschheit Anwalt (1920)
- Three Nights (1920)
- Whitechapel (1920)
- The Dancer Barberina (1920)
- Evening – Night – Morning (1920)
- The Golem: How He Came into the World (1920)
- Ships and People (1920)
- The Fear of Women (1921)
- The Raft of the Dead (1921)
- The Terror of the Red Mill (1921)
- Der Gang durch die Hölle (1921)
- Treasure of the Aztecs (1921)
- The Shadow of Gaby Leed (1921)
- A Dying Nation (1922, two parts)
- Fridericus Rex (1922–23, four parts)
- William Tell (1923)
- The Money Devil (1923)
- The Burning Secret (1923)
- Gobseck (1924)
- The New Land (1924)
- ...und es lockt ein Ruf aus sündiger Welt (1925)
- Passion (1925)
- The Wig (1925)
- The Iron Bride (1925)
- The Fallen (1926)
- Eternal Allegiance (1926)
- The Mill at Sanssouci (1926)
- The Sporck Battalion (1927)
- The Holy Lie (1927)
- The Old Fritz (1928)
- The Chaste Coquette (1929)
- Waterloo (1929)
- Scapa Flow (1930)
- Der Detektiv des Kaisers (1930)
- The Flute Concert of Sanssouci (1930)
- Der Erlkönig (1931)
- The Dancer of Sanssouci (1932)
- The Hymn of Leuthen (1933)
- Fridericus (1937)
- Das schöne Fräulein Schragg (1937)
- Women for Golden Hill (1938)
- Nanon (1938)
- The Merciful Lie (1939)
- Casanova heiratet (1940)
- Passion (1940)
- Bismarck (1940)
- Kopf hoch, Johannes! (1941)
- Much Ado About Nixi (1942)
- The Great King (1942)
- The Golden Spider (1943)
- Nacht ohne Abschied (1943)
- Immensee (1943)
- Fritze Bollmann wollte angeln (1943)
- When the Young Wine Blossoms (1943)
- Der Erbförster (1945)
- And the Heavens Above Us (1947)
- The Prisoner (1949)
- Anonymous Letters (1949)
- Tobias Knopp – Abenteuer eines Junggesellen (1950, voice)
- Melody of Fate (1950)
- Three Girls Spinning (1950)
- The Lie (1950)
- Dr. Holl (1951)
- Immortal Beloved (1951)
- When the Evening Bells Ring (1951)
- Stips (1951)
- Sensation in San Remo (1951)
- Torreani (1951)
- Das ewige Spiel (1951)
- The Heath Is Green (1951)
- Oh, You Dear Fridolin (1952)
- A Thousand Red Roses Bloom (1952)
- Fritz and Friederike (1952)
- The Devil Makes Three (1952)
- Don't Ask My Heart (1952)
- When the Heath Dreams at Night (1952)
- Stars Over Colombo (1953)
- Street Serenade (1953)
- Red Roses, Red Lips, Red Wine (1953)
- Father Is Being Stupid (1953)
- The Blue Hour (1953)
- Have Sunshine in Your Heart (1953)
- Meines Vaters Pferde (1954, two parts)
- The Prisoner of the Maharaja (1954)
- The Man of My Life (1954)
- Sauerbruch – Das war mein Leben (1954)
- Rose-Girl Resli (1954, final film role)

=== Films with Otto Gebühr as Frederick the Great ===
- 1920: The Dancer Barberina - director: Carl Boese
- 1921–23: Fridericus Rex – director: Arzén von Cserépy

Teil 1 - Sturm und Drang
Teil 2 - Vater und Sohn
Teil 3 - Sanssouci
Teil 4 - Schicksalswende

- The Mill at Sanssouci (1926) – director: Siegfried Philippi
- 1928: The Old Fritz – director: Gerhard Lamprecht

Teil 1 - Friede
Teil 2 - Ausklang

- 1930: The Flute Concert of Sanssouci – director: Gustav Ucicky
- 1932: The Dancer of Sanssouci – director: Friedrich Zelnik
- 1933: The Hymn of Leuthen – director: Carl Froelich
- 1936. Heiteres und Ernstes um den großen König - director: Phil Jutzi
- 1936: Fridericus – director: Johannes Meyer
- 1937: Das schöne Fräulein Schragg – director: Hans Deppe
- 1942: The Great King – director: Veit Harlan
