= The Mill at Sanssouci =

1926 film

- German film poster
- German: Die Mühle von Sanssouci
- Directed by: Frederic Zelnik; Siegfried Philippi
- Written by: Siegfried Philippi (play); Hans Behrendt
- Produced by: Karl Freund
- Starring: Otto Gebühr; Lissi Lind; Jakob Tiedtke; Anita Dorris
- Cinematography: Frederik Fuglsang
- Music by: Willy Schmidt-Gentner
- Production company: Deutsche Vereins-Film
- Distributed by: Fox-Europa Production
- Release date: 1 February 1926
- Running time: 124 minutes
- Country: Germany
- Languages: Silent; German intertitles

The Mill at Sanssouci (German: Die Mühle von Sanssouci) is a 1926 German silent historical film directed by Siegfried Philippi and Frederic Zelnik and starring Otto Gebühr, Lissi Lind and Jakob Tiedtke. The film is part of the popular cycle of Prussian films. It premiered on 1 February 1926.

The film was released by the German subsidiary of the American company Fox Film. It was shot at the Staaken Studios in Berlin. Art direction was by Andrej Andrejew and Gustav A. Knauer. The title alludes to the Historic Mill of Sanssouci constructed in the 18th century.

== Plot ==
Prussia, 1750. After the end of the Silesian Wars, Frederick II returns to Sanssouci exhausted from the events of the war. But the mill of the miller Casper, once the noblest and most expensive construction in the world rattles so loudly, that his majesty feels very disturbed during the time of rest. He issues an edict which should silence the miller and his mill from functioning during the time of peace, but Casper is beyond stubborn. He confronts the king's decree, insisting that all people are equal before the law in Prussia.

Soon the dispute escalates, and Casper decides to even obtain a court ruling in this matter (of which Frederick knows that he can only lose before Justice in view of the equality requirement he had established). Eventually, the two parties decide to seek an out-of-court solution that enables reconciliation. Under various pretenses, His Majesty can promote the marriage of two couples, including two of his soldiers (Lieutenant von Bärenfels and Corporal Jobst) by following in the footsteps of French writer Voltaire, and eventually move things forward in his own amorous affair – his relationship with the dancer Barberina.

== Cast ==
- Otto Gebühr as Friedrich der Große
- Lissi Lind as Wilhelmine von Bayreuth
- Jakob Tiedtke as Miller Casper
- Anita Dorris as Luise, his daughter
- Hermann Boettcher as Jeweller Lustig
- Hanni Weisse as Henriette, his daughter
- Heinrich Peer as Chamberlain von Bärenfels
- Georg Alexander as Lieutenant von Bärenfels, his son
- Olga Chekhova as dancer Barberina
- Carl Goetz as Voltaire
- Wilhelm Chandron as General Schwerin
- Georg John as General Zieten
- Eduard von Winterstein as Leopold, der alte Dessauer, General
- Emil Rameau as General Winterfeldt
- Georg H. Schnell as General Seydlitz
- Arthur Kraußneck as General von Keith
- Leopold von Ledebur as Major von Zedwitz
- Valeska Stock as his wife
- William Dieterle as Jobst, corporal
- Wilhelm Diegelmann as innkeeper Niedermeier
- Fritz Kampers as Theodor, his son
- Lotte Werkmeister as Marie, Schankmamsell
- Gerhard Ritterband as Ladislaus
- Adolf Bassermann as Adjutant Buddenbrock
