= Fridericus Rex =

1922 film

- Directed by: Arzén von Cserépy
- Written by: Hans Behrendt; Bobby E. Lüthge; Arzén von Cserépy
- Produced by: Arzén von Cserépy
- Starring: Otto Gebühr; Albert Steinrück; Gertrud de Lalsky
- Cinematography: Ernst Lüttgens; Guido Seeber
- Music by: Marc Roland
- Production company: Cserépy Film
- Distributed by: UFA
- Release date: 31 January 1922
- Country: Germany
- Languages: Silent; German intertitles

Fridericus Rex (German: Fridericus Rex - 1. Teil: Sturm und Drang) is a 1922 German silent historical film directed by Arzén von Cserépy and starring Otto Gebühr, Albert Steinrück and Gertrud de Lalsky.

It portrays the life of the eighteenth century monarch Frederick the Great. Immensely popular, it was followed by three sequels and launched the Prussian film as a major German genre during the Weimar era.

The film's sets were designed by the art directors Hans Dreier and Ernö Metzner. The film was shot at the Johannisthal Studios in Berlin. Location filming took place at the Charlottenburg Palace and other sites around historic Brandenburg.

== Cast ==
- Otto Gebühr as Friedrich
- Albert Steinrück as Friedrich Wilhelm I
- Gertrud de Lalsky as Sophie Dorothee
- Charlotte Schultz as Wilhelmine
- Erna Morena as Elisabeth Christine von Braunschweig-Bevern
- Lilly Flohr as Frau von Morien
- Eduard von Winterstein as Leopold Fürst von Anhalt-Dessau
- Bruno Decarli as Minister Grumbkow
- Eugen Burg
- Theodor Burghardt as General Friedrich Wilhelm von Seydlitz
- Joseph Klein
- Adolf Klein
- Friedrich Kayßler as Count Finkenstein
- Rolf Prasch
- Franz Groß
- Emil Heß as Minister August Friedrich Von Boden
- Marie von Bülow
- Albert Patry as Müller
- Lili Alexandra as Doris Ritter
- Wilhelm Prager as Kantor Ritter
- Antonie Jaeckel
- Heinrich George as Prince Charles Alexander of Lorraine
- Trude Hesterberg as Madame de Pompadour
- Werner Krauss as Count Kaunitz
- Maria Orska as Barberina Campanini
- Agnes Straub as Maria Theresa
- Robert Sortch-Pla as Voltaire
- Leopold von Ledebur as Louis XV

== Bibliography ==
- Linda Schulte-Sasse. Entertaining the Third Reich: Illusions of Wholeness in Nazi Cinema. Duke University Press, 1996.
