= The Dancer of Sanssouci =

1932 film

- German film poster
- German: Die Tänzerin von Sans Souci
- Directed by: Frederic Zelnik
- Written by: Hans Behrendt; Fanny Carlsen
- Produced by: Frederic Zelnik; Gabriel Levy; Fred Lyssa
- Starring: Otto Gebühr; Lil Dagover; Rosa Valetti
- Narrated by: Hugo Fischer-Köppe
- Cinematography: Friedl Behn-Grund
- Music by: Marc Roland
- Production company: Aafa-Film
- Distributed by: Aafa-Film
- Release date: 8 September 1932
- Running time: 93 minutes
- Country: Germany
- Language: German

The Dancer of Sanssouci (German: Die Tänzerin von Sans Souci) is a 1932 German historical drama film directed by Frederic Zelnik and starring Otto Gebühr, Lil Dagover, and Rosa Valetti. Set at the court of Frederick the Great, the film is part of a group of Prussian films made during the era. It portrays the interaction between Frederick and the celebrated dancer Barberina Campanini. Gebühr had previously appeared as Frederick in a silent film The Dancer Barberina about their relationship.

The film's sets were designed by the art director Leopold Blonder. It was shot at the Staaken Studios in Berlin. It premiered in the city at the Ufa-Palast am Zoo.

== Cast ==
- Otto Gebühr as Frederick II
- Lil Dagover as Barberina Campanini
- Rosa Valetti as mother
- Hans Stüwe as Baron Cocceji
- Hans Junkermann as Baron Pöllnitz
- Hans Mierendorff as Old Dessauer
- Paul Lipinski as General Ziethen
- Bernhard Goetzke as General Seydlitz
- Karl Platen as Fredersdorff
- Hans Brausewetter as Möller
- Margot Landa as Evchen
- Paul Rehkopf as Gärtner, Evchen's father
- Iris Arlan as Lady Brigelli
- Philipp Manning as Johann Sebastian Bach
- Carl de Vogt as Pesne
- Paul Otto as Cagliostro
- Hermann Böttcher as Count Kaunitz
- Ernst Wurmser as Austrian General field marshal
- Leo Monosson as singer

== Bibliography ==
- Hake, Sabine (2002). German National Cinema. Routledge. ISBN 0415420989.
