= A Day on Mars =

1921 film

- Directed by: Heinz Schall
- Written by: Mathilde Wieder
- Produced by: Arzén von Cserépy
- Starring: Lilly Flohr; Hermann Picha; Gerhard Ritterband; Hans Behrendt
- Cinematography: Curt Courant
- Production company: Cserépy-Film
- Release date: 20 February 1921
- Country: Germany
- Languages: Silent; German intertitles

A Day on Mars (German: Ein Tag auf dem Mars) is a 1921 German silent sci-fi comedy film directed by Heinz Schall and starring Lilly Flohr, Hermann Picha and Gerhard Ritterband. It premiered in Berlin on 20 February 1921.

== Cast ==
- Lilly Flohr as Filmstar / Mars-Prinzessin
- Hermann Picha as Astronom Himmelswurm
- Gerhard Ritterband as Famulus
- Hans Behrendt
- Henri Peters-Arnolds

== Bibliography ==
- Grange, William. Cultural Chronicle of the Weimar Republic. Scarecrow Press, 2008.
