= Strong Winds =

1924 film

- Directed by: Reinhold Schünzel
- Written by: Arzén von Cserépy
- Produced by: Arzén von Cserépy
- Starring: Maria Kamradek; Alwin Neuss; Albert Bennefeld
- Cinematography: Kurt Stanke
- Production company: Cserépy-Film
- Distributed by: UFA
- Release date: 21 November 1924
- Running time: 90 minutes
- Country: Germany
- Languages: Silent; German intertitles

Strong Winds (German: Windstärke 9. Die Geschichte einer reichen Erbin) is a 1924 German silent film directed by Reinhold Schünzel and starring Maria Kamradek, Alwin Neuss and Albert Bennefeld.

The film's sets were designed by the art director Franz Schroedter.

== Cast ==
- Maria Kamradek as Mabel Samson
- Alwin Neuss as Flanaga, ihr Vetter
- Albert Bennefeld
- Harry Halm
- Adolf Klein
- Rudolf Lettinger

== Bibliography ==
- Hans-Michael Bock & Michael Töteberg. Das Ufa-Buch. Zweitausendeins, 1992.
