= Arzén von Cserépy =

Hungarian screenwriter, film producer and director

- Born: 17 July 1881; Budapest; Austria-Hungary
- Died: March 1958 (aged 76)
- Other names: Arzén Cserépy, Konrad Wieder
- Occupations: Screenwriter, Producer, Director
- Years active: 1914–1942

Arzén von Cserépy (1881–1958) was a Hungarian screenwriter, film producer and director who was based in Germany. He ran his own production company Cserépy-Film until it was merged into the larger UFA empire. von Cserépy became associated with a series of films about the Prussian monarch Frederick the Great. He was sometimes credited as Arzén Cserépy.

Cserépy joined the Nazi Party in January 1932.

== Selected filmography ==
=== Screenwriter ===
- The Armoured Vault (1914)
- Marshal Forwards (1932)

=== Producer ===
- Catherine the Great (1920)
- Mary Magdalene (1920)
- The Girl from Acker Street (1920)
- A Day on Mars (1921)
- Fridericus Rex (1922-1923)
- Old Heidelberg (1923)
- Strong Winds (1924)
- The Hymn of Leuthen (1933)

=== Director ===
- Seltsame Köpfe (1916)
- Colomba (1918)
- Pandora's Box (1921)
- Fridericus Rex (1922)
- The Hymn of Leuthen (1933)
- A Woman With Power of Attorney (1934)
- Don't Lose Heart, Suzanne! (1935)
- Landslide (1940)
- On the Way Home (1940)
- Let's Love Each Other (1941)

== Bibliography ==
- Kaes, Anton. Shell Shock Cinema: Weimar Culture and the Wounds of War. Princeton University Press, 2009.
- Kreimeier, Klaus. The Ufa story: a history of Germany's greatest film company, 1918-1945. University of California Press, 1999.
