= Shame (1922 film) =

1922 film

- Directed by: Siegfried Dessauer
- Written by: Jane Bess
- Starring: Lilly Flohr; Gerda Frey; Robert Scholz
- Production company: Ima-Film
- Release date: 16 March 1922
- Country: Germany
- Languages: Silent; German intertitles

Shame (German: Schande) is a 1922 German silent drama film directed by Siegfried Dessauer and starring Lilly Flohr, Gerda Frey and Robert Scholz.

== Cast ==
- Lilly Flohr as Irm Bernardi
- Gerda Frey as Sylvia - ihre Schwester
- Robert Scholz as Peter Dorn
- Anna von Palen
- Fritz Kampers
- Curt Cappi
- Sophie Pagay
- Paul Müller

== Bibliography ==
- Grange, William. Cultural Chronicle of the Weimar Republic. Scarecrow Press, 2008.
