= The Red Cat =

1920 film

- German: Die rote Katze
- Directed by: Erich Schönfelder
- Production company: Tassia-Film
- Release date: 1920
- Country: Germany
- Languages: Silent; German intertitles

The Red Cat (German: Die rote Katze) is a 1920 German silent film directed by Erich Schönfelder.

== Cast ==
- Tassia Schirkoff
- Sig Arno
- Hans Junkermann
- Rosa Valetti
