= The Man Who Murdered =

1931 film

- Directed by: Curtis Bernhardt
- Written by: Pierre Frondaie; Heinz Goldberg; Henry Koster; Harry Kahn; Carl Mayer
- Based on: L'homme qui assassina by Claude Farrère
- Produced by: Curt Melnitz; Ralph Scotoni; Victor Skutezky
- Starring: Conrad Veidt; Trude von Molo; Heinrich George
- Cinematography: Curt Courant
- Edited by: Laslo Benedek
- Music by: Hans J. Salter
- Production company: Terra Film
- Distributed by: Terra Film
- Release date: 23 January 1931
- Running time: 93 minutes
- Country: Germany
- Language: German

The Man Who Murdered (German: Der Mann, der den Mord beging) is a 1931 German crime drama film directed by Curtis Bernhardt and starring Conrad Veidt, Trude von Molo and Heinrich George. It is adapted from the 1906 novel L'homme qui assassina by Claude Farrère. The film's sets were designed by the art directors Heinrich Richter and Hermann Warm. It was shot at the Babelsberg Studios in Potsdam. Location filming took place in Istanbul and around the Bosphorus. It premiered at the Gloria-Palast in Berlin. The following year a separate English version, Stamboul, was made.

== Synopsis ==
In pre-First World War Constantinople, French colonel the Marquis de Sévigné is brought in to train the Turkish Army. He encounters the domineering Lord Falkland and his sensitive wife. Although the marriage is loveless, she can't consider leaving her husband as it would mean also losing her young son George. Sévigné falls in love with her, and shoots Lord Falkland. However, suspicion of the murder then falls on an innocent man.

== Cast ==
- Conrad Veidt as Marquis de Sévigné
- Trude von Molo as Lady Falkland
- Heinrich George as Lord Falkland
- Friedl Haerlin as Lady Edith
- Frida Richard as Lady Foult
- Friedrich Kayßler as Mehmed Pascha
- Gregori Chmara as Prince Cernuwicz
- Erich Ponto as Boucher - franz. Gesandter
- Hans-Joachim Möbis as Terrail
- Yvette Rodin as Mme. Terrail
- Rolf Drucker as George Falkland - Sohn
- Bruno Ziener as Prospère - Diener bei Sévigné

== See also ==
- The Right to Love (1920)
- Stamboul (1931)

== Bibliography ==
- Grange, William (2008). Cultural Chronicle of the Weimar Republic. Scarecrow Press. ISBN 978-0-8108-5967-8.
- Soister, John T. Conrad Veidt on Screen: A Comprehensive Illustrated Filmography. McFarland, 2002.
- Spicer, Andrew; Hanson, Helen (2013). A Companion to Film Noir. John Wiley & Sons. ISBN 978-1-118-52371-1.
