= The Salesgirl from the Fashion Store =

1925 film

- Directed by: Wolfgang Neff
- Written by: Ruth Goetz; Josef Wiener-Braunsberg (novel: Warenhausmädchen)
- Starring: Reinhold Schünzel; Lilly Flohr; Evi Eva
- Cinematography: Kurt Lande
- Music by: Hansheinrich Dransmann
- Production company: Primus-Film
- Release date: March 1925
- Country: Germany
- Languages: Silent; German intertitles

The Salesgirl from the Fashion Store (German: Die Kleine aus der Konfektion) is a 1925 German silent comedy film directed by Wolfgang Neff and starring Reinhold Schünzel, Lilly Flohr and Evi Eva.

The film's sets were designed by the art director Alfred Junge.

== Cast ==
- Reinhold Schünzel
- Lilly Flohr
- Evi Eva
- Olga Engl
- Margarete Kupfer
- Claire Rommer
- Anna von Palen
- Karl Beckersachs
- Hans Junkermann
- Gerhard Ritterband
- Karl Harbacher
- Siegfried Berisch

== Bibliography ==
- Bock, Hans-Michael & Bergfelder, Tim. The Concise CineGraph. Encyclopedia of German Cinema. Berghahn Books, 2009.
- Jennifer M. Kapczynski & Michael D. Richardson. A New History of German Cinema. Boydell & Brewer, 2014.
