= Power of Temptation =

1922 film

- German: Macht der Versuchung
- Directed by: Paul L. Stein
- Written by: Rolf E. Vanloo
- Produced by: Paul Davidson
- Starring: Lil Dagover; Ilka Grüning; Arnold Korff
- Cinematography: Frederik Fuglsang
- Production company: PAGU
- Distributed by: UFA
- Release date: 13 October 1922
- Country: Germany
- Languages: Silent; German intertitles

Power of Temptation (German: Macht der Versuchung) is a 1922 German silent film directed by Paul L. Stein and starring Lil Dagover, Ilka Grüning and Arnold Korff.

== Cast ==
In alphabetical order

- Lil Dagover
- Ilka Grüning
- Arnold Korff
- Theodor Loos
- Paul Otto
- Heinrich Schroth
- Trude Singer
