= Paul Otto =

German actor

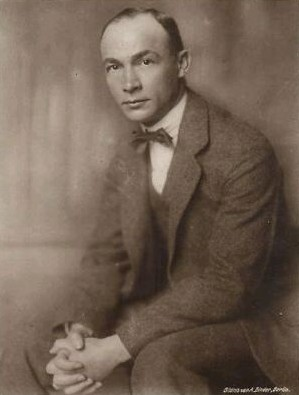
- Born: Paul Otto Schlesinger; 8 February 1878; Berlin, German Empire
- Died: 25 November 1943 (aged 65); Berlin, Nazi Germany
- Occupation: Actor
- Years active: 1910–1940

Paul Otto Schlesinger (8 February 1878 – 25 or 30 November 1943) was a German film actor and director. Born in Berlin, he began a qualification as a retail merchant and made his actor's debut at the age of 17. Otto worked at theaters in Halle, Wiesbaden and Hanover before he returned to Berlin about 1906.

He first appeared in the silent film Ringkampf Konkurrenz in 1910 and in Arsène Lupin contra Sherlock Holmes (1910-11, five episode film serial) next to Viggo Larsen. In 1912 Otto directed his first own film Selbstgerichtet. In the beginning of the 1930s, he also appeared in successful sound movies like Der Hauptmann von Köpenick. After 1933, Otto returned to theater stages and worked at the Deutsches Theater Berlin and the Kammerspiele Berlin. In 1937, he was awarded the title of Staatsschauspieler (state actor), and in 1942 Joseph Goebbels promoted him to the head of the stage council at the Reichskulturkammer.

In September 1943, his Jewish descent was discovered. To avoid his deportation, Otto committed suicide on 30 November 1943, together with his wife Charlotte Klinder-Otto at his home in Berlin.

== Selected filmography ==
Otto appeared in 144 films between 1910 and 1940.

- Arsène Lupin contra Sherlock Holmes (1910–11)
- Frontstairs and Backstairs (1915)
- The Confessions of the Green Mask (1916)
- The Woman at the Crossroads (1919)
- Revenge Is Mine (1919)
- Bettler GmbH (1919)
- Judith Trachtenberg (1920)
- Temperamental Artist (1920)
- Scherben (1921)
- Parisian Women (1921)
- Ash Wednesday (1921)
- Peter Voss, Thief of Millions (1921)
- The Sins of the Mother (1921)
- The Inheritance of Tordis (1921)
- Power of Temptation (1922)
- The Flight into Marriage (1922)
- Tabitha, Stand Up (1922)
- Miss Rockefeller Is Filming (1922)
- His Excellency from Madagascar (1922)
- Inge Larsen (1923)
- Comedians of Life (1924)
- Girls You Don't Marry (1924)
- Women Who Fall by the Wayside (1925)
- The Wife of Forty Years (1925)
- Hussar Fever (1925)
- The Old Ballroom (1925)
- Women You Rarely Greet (1925)
- The Gentleman Without a Residence (1925)
- Women of Passion (1926)
- The Trial of Donald Westhof (1927)
- The Bordellos of Algiers (1927)
- The Hunt for the Bride (1927)
- The Lorelei (1927)
- Benno Stehkragen (1927)
- Potsdam (1927)
- Forbidden Love (1927)
- Grand Hotel (1927)
- The Eighteen Year Old (1927)
- The Green Alley (1928)
- Sajenko the Soviet (1928)
- The Abduction of the Sabine Women (1928)
- Only a Viennese Woman Kisses Like That (1928)
- The Gallant Hussar (1928)
- The Love of the Brothers Rott (1929)
- The Tsarevich (1929)
- Three Days Confined to Barracks (1930)
- Cadets (1931)
- The Captain from Köpenick (1931)
- Elisabeth of Austria (1931)
- Storm in a Water Glass (1931)
- The Other Side (1931)
- Rasputin, Demon with Women (1932)
- Overnight Sensation (1932)
- The Secret of Johann Orth (1932)
- Cavaliers of the Kurfürstendamm (1932)
- This One or None (1932)
- The Dancer of Sanssouci (1932)
- Things Are Getting Better Already (1932)
- The Invisible Front (1932)
- Kiki (1932)
- A Love Story (1933)
- Spies at Work (1933)
- The Hymn of Leuthen (1933)
- Tell Me Who You Are (1933)
- The Tsarevich (1933)
- You Are Adorable, Rosmarie (1934)
- Between Two Hearts (1934)
- Police Report (1934)
- Escapade (1936)
- The Castle in Flanders (1936)
- Togger (1937)
- Unternehmen Michael (1937)
- The Mystery of Betty Bonn (1938)
- Little County Court (1938)
- Pour le Mérite (1938)
- What Now, Sibylle? (1938)
- Uproar in Damascus (1939)
- The Governor (1939)
- Robert Koch (1939)
- D III 88 (1939)
- Woman Without a Past (1939)
- The Fox of Glenarvon (1940)
- Passion (1940)
- Falstaff in Vienna (1940)
