= Rosa Valetti =

German actress (1876–1937)

Rosa Vallentin
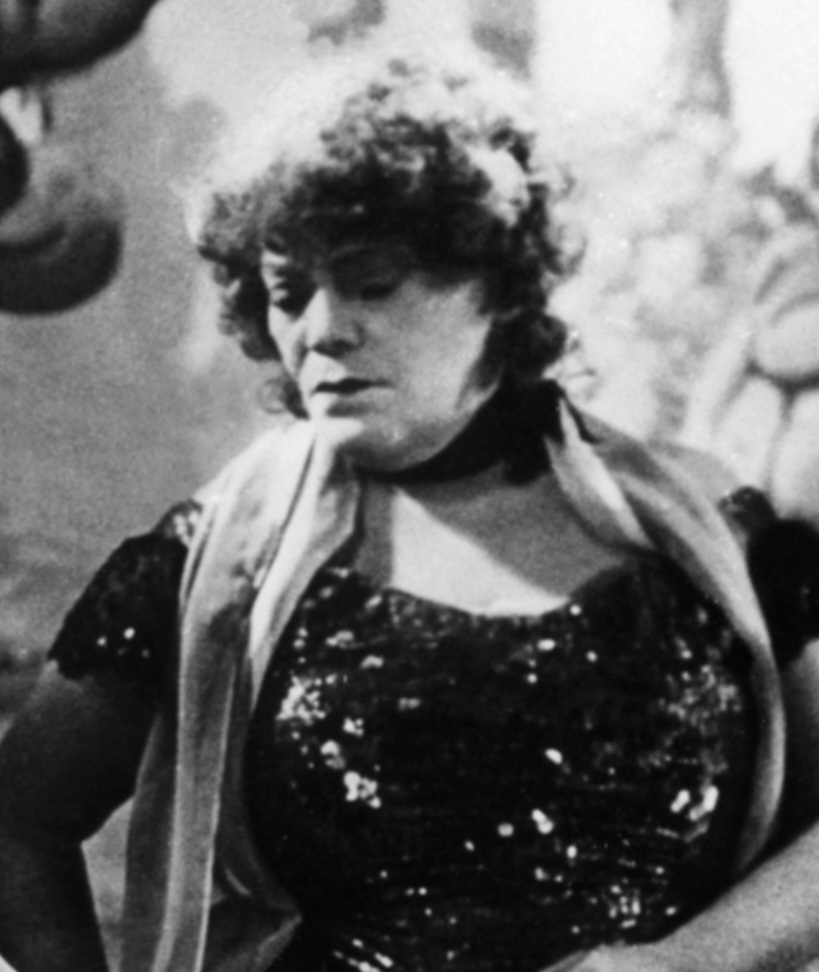
- Valetti in The Blue Angel (1930)
- Born: Rosa Alice Vallentin; 17 March 1876; Berlin, German Empire
- Died: 10 December 1937 (aged 61); Vienna, Austria
- Occupation: Actress
- Years active: 1911–1934
- Relatives: Hermann Vallentin (brother)

Rosa Valetti (born Rosa Alice Vallentin; 25 January 1876 – 10 December 1937) was a German actress, cabaret performer, and singer.

== Biography ==
Rosa Valetti was born in Berlin, the daughter of industrialist Felix Vallentin and sister of actor Hermann Vallentin. She played her first roles in the theatres of suburban Berlin. Inspired by the November Revolution and her meeting with political satirist Kurt Tucholsky, Valetti began performing in cabarets. In 1920, she founded the Café Grössenwahn ("Café Megalomania"), which has been recognized as one of the most important literary and political cabarets in 1920s Berlin. Café Megalomania was frequented by Expressionist writers, and the program of sketch comedy and political songs reflected Valetti's belief in the cabaret as an instrument of political and social criticism.

The inflation of 1919 to 1923 and the subsequent collapse of the German economy forced Valetti to close Cafe Megalomania. She directed the cabaret Rakete for a time, then launched another cafe of her own, the Rampe, which hosted the works of revolutionist poet and singer Erich Weinert. Valetti was among the founders of the floating cabaret Larifari during the late 1920s. In 1928, she performed as Mrs. Peachum in the original cast of Bertolt Brecht's Threepenny Opera, which was staged under the direction of Erich Engel at Berlin's Theater am Schiffbauerdamm.

Rosa Valetti acted in film roles from 1911. Her age and sturdy mien ensured that she acted mostly in motherly roles, as in the 1925 film Die Prinzessin und der Geiger (The Princess and the Violinist), in which she played a 46-year-old grandmother. In Josef von Sternberg's 1930 film Der Blaue Engel (The Blue Angel), she plays the wife of the magician, Kiepert (Kurt Gerron). Valetti also appears briefly in Fritz Lang's 1931 classic M as the proprietor of an underworld cafe.

In 1933, Valetti went into exile, performing first in Vienna and Prague, then in Palestine in 1936. She married actor Ludwig Roth and had a daughter, the actress Lisl Valetti, with him.

Rosa Valetti died in Vienna on 10 December 1937. She was buried at the Urnenhain. The grave existed until 2001.

A street in Berlin's Mahlsdorf district is named "Rosa-Valetti-Strasse" in her honour.

== Selected filmography ==
- Frau Potiphar (1911)
- Die Ballhaus-Anna (1911)
- Wollen sie meine Tochter heiraten? (1914, Short)
- Kleine weiße Sklaven (1914)
- The Vice (1915) - Mutter
- Spiel im Spiel (1916)
- Rosa kann alles (1916)
- Die Gräfin Heyers (1916)
- Nicht lange täuschte mich das Glück (1917)
- Die toten Augen (1917)
- Othello oder: Das Verhängnis eines Fürstenhauses (1918)
- Wanderratten (1918, Short)
- Die lachende Maske (1918)
- Seelenverkäufer (1919) - Frau Houtton
- Die Geächteten (1919) - Maruschka Czapka, die Frau vom Wirt
- Madeleine (1919)
- Hang Lu oder: Der verhängnisvolle Schmuck (1919)
- Verlorene Töchter, 3. Teil - Die Menschen nennen es Liebe (1920)
- The Yellow Death (1920) - Awdotja
- The Dancer Barberina (1920) - Frau Campanini
- Narrentanz der Liebe (1920) - Wirtin
- The Girl from Acker Street (1920) - Mutter Schulze
- Kurfürstendamm (1920) - Frau Lesser
- Moral (1920)
- Respectable Women (1920)
- Christian Wahnschaffe (1920)
- The Guilt of Lavinia Morland (1920)
- Helmsman Holk (1920) - Greta Grien
- Die entfesselte Menschheit (1920)
- Die rote Katze (1920)
- Der fliegende Tod (1920)
- Der Dummkopf (1921) - Madame Schirmar
- The House on the Moon (1921)
- Hannerl and Her Lovers (1921) - Wahrsagerin
- The Three Aunts (1921)
- Das Mädchen aus der Ackerstraße - 3. Teil (1921)
- The Hotel of the Dead (1921)
- The Eternal Curse (1921)
- Die im Schatten gehen (1921)
- The Earl of Essex (1922) - Mrs. Cuff
- The Stream (1922)
- Carousel (1922)
- Die Schneiderkomtess (1922)
- Rudderless (1924)
- Zwischen Morgen und Morgen (1924)
- The Golden Calf (1925) - Frau Huber
- The Marriage Swindler (1925)
- The Flower Girl of Potsdam Square (1925) - Rieke Schulze
- Die Prinzessin und der Geiger (1925) - Michaels Grossmutter / Grandmother
- The Fire Dancer (1925) - Portiersfrau
- Oh Those Glorious Old Student Days (1925)
- The Woman without Money (1925)
- The Morals of the Alley (1925)
- Tartüff (1925) - Seine Haushälterin / Housekeeper
- The Ones Down There (1926)
- Accommodations for Marriage (1926)
- Tea Time in the Ackerstrasse (1926)
- The Captain from Koepenick (1926)
- Darling, Count the Cash (1926) - Heiratsvermittlerin
- Orphan of Lowood (1926) - Grace Poole
- How Do I Marry the Boss? (1927)
- Always Be True and Faithful (1927) - Fedora Bratfisch, Karussellbesitzerin
- The Transformation of Dr. Bessel (1927) - Die Wirtin des Hotel garni
- The Story of a Little Parisian (1928)
- Herkules Maier (1928) - Wirtin
- Spione (1928) - Kitty's Mother (uncredited)
- Gaunerliebchen (1928) - Alte
- The Burning Heart (1929)
- Asphalt (1929) - Frau an der Theke
- The Hero of Every Girl's Dream (1929)
- The Blue Angel (1930) - Guste, His Wife
- Täter gesucht (1931) - Nachbarin
- M – Eine Stadt sucht einen Mörder (1931) - Bartender
- The Secret of the Red Cat (1931) - Laura Jefferson
- The Scoundrel (1931) - Frau Kochanke
- The Theft of the Mona Lisa (1931)
- The Adventurer of Tunis (1931) - Madame Rosa
- Marriage with Limited Liability (1931) - Frau Hollmann, seine Wirtin
- Ehe mit beschränkter Haftung (1931)
- Wiener Wald (1931) - Herself
- Two Hearts Beat as One (1932)
- Scandal on Park Street (1932)
- The Invisible Front (1932)
- The Dancer of Sanssouci (1932) - Mother
- Die unsichtbare Front (1933) - Tante Jenny
- Moral und Liebe (1933) - Frau Wronskaja
- Liliom (1934) - Minor Role (uncredited) (final film role)

== Sources ==
- Appignanesi, Lisa (1976). The Cabaret. New York: Universe Books. ISBN 978-0-87663-235-2.
- Von Eckardt, Wolf; Gilman, Sander L. (1975). Bertolt Brecht's Berlin: A Scrapbook of the Twenties. Garden City, NY: Anchor Press. ISBN 978-0-385-05501-7.
