= Bettler GmbH =

1919 film

- Directed by: Alwin Neuß
- Written by: Fritz Lang
- Produced by: Erich Pommer
- Starring: Paul Otto; Lil Dagover
- Production company: Decla-Film
- Release date: 2 May 1919
- Country: Germany
- Languages: Silent; German intertitles

Bettler GmbH is a 1919 German silent film directed by Alwin Neuß and starring Paul Otto and Lil Dagover.

== Cast ==
- Fritz Achterberg
- Lil Dagover
- Fred Goebel
- Alwin Neuß as Bobby
- Paul Otto

== Bibliography ==
- Hardt, Ursula (1996). From Caligari to California: Erich Pommer's Life in the International Film Wars. Providence: Berghahn Books. ISBN 978-1-57181-930-7.
- McGilligan, Patrick (2013) [1997]. Fritz Lang: The Nature of the Beast. Minneapolis: University of Minnesota Press. ISBN 978-1-4529-4064-9.
