= The Theft of the Mona Lisa =

1931 film directed by Géza von Bolváry

- Vicenzo Peruggia (Willi Forst) stealing the Mona Lisa
- Directed by: Géza von Bolváry
- Written by: Walter Reisch
- Produced by: Julius Haimann
- Starring: Trude von Molo; Willi Forst; Gustaf Gründgens
- Cinematography: Willy Goldberger
- Edited by: Hermann Haller
- Music by: Robert Stolz
- Production company: Super-Film
- Distributed by: Super-Film
- Release date: 25 August 1931
- Running time: 89 minutes
- Country: Germany
- Language: German

The Theft of the Mona Lisa (German: Der Raub der Mona Lisa) is a 1931 German drama film directed by Géza von Bolváry and starring Trude von Molo, Willi Forst, and Gustaf Gründgens. It is based on a true story. It was shot at the Tempelhof Studios in Berlin. The film's sets were designed by the art directors Andrej Andrejew and Robert A. Dietrich.

== Plot ==
In 1911, Vincenzo Peruggia is a poverty-stricken Italian glazier who falls in love with Mathilde, a French hotel maid. Struck by the girl's resemblance to Leonardo da Vinci's Mona Lisa, Vicenzo steals the painting from the Louvre in hopes of impressing her. When she proves to be fickle, the crestfallen hero confesses and is arrested. Unwilling to admit that he had been led astray by a woman, Vicenzo claims that he stole the painting in order to restore it to his native Italy and is hailed as a national hero.

== Cast ==
- Trude von Molo as Mathilde, Stubenmädchen
- Willi Forst as Vicenzo Peruggia
- Gustaf Gründgens as Unbekannter
- Fritz Odemar as Direktor des Louvre
- Max Gülstorff as Oberaufseher
- Paul Kemp as Polizeileutnant
- Anton Pointner as Reisender
- Rosa Valetti as Die Hauswirtin
- Angelo Ferrari as Italienischer Polizeikommissar
- Hubert von Meyerinck as Museumsführer
- Alexander Granach as Redner
- Fritz Grünbaum as Angeblicher Bilderdieb
- Gerti Klemm as Sängerin
- Fritz Alberti
- Fritz Greiner
- Paul Vincenti
- Paul Wagner
- Ernst Reicher
- Hugo Döblin
- Bruno Ziener
- Teddy Bill
- Elfriede Jera
- Molino von Kluck
- Lilian Ellis
- Hermine Sterler
- Ferdinand von Alten

== See also ==
- The Mona Lisa Has Been Stolen (1966) - free remake

== Bibliography ==
- Hull, David Stewart (1969). Film in the Third Reich: A Study of the German Cinema, 1933–1945. Berkeley: University of California Press. ISBN 978-0-520-01489-3.
- Klaus, Ulrich J. Deutsche Tonfilme: Jahrgang 1931. Klaus-Archiv, 2006.
