= The Woman from Monte Carlo =

1932 film

- Directed by: Michael Curtiz
- Written by: Harvey Thew
- Based on: the play Veille d'Armes by Claude Farrere and Lucien Nepoty
- Starring: Lil Dagover
- Cinematography: Ernest Haller
- Edited by: Harold McLernon
- Music by: Bernhard Kaun
- Distributed by: Warner Bros. Pictures; First National Pictures
- Release date: January 9, 1932 (U.S.)
- Running time: 65 minutes
- Country: United States
- Language: English

The Woman from Monte Carlo is an American pre-Code film produced by Warner Bros. subsidiary First National Pictures (with the Vitaphone logo) in 1931 and released on January 9, 1932. It was directed by Michael Curtiz and gave top billing to German star Lil Dagover in her sole Hollywood film. Leading men Walter Huston and Warren William were listed after the title in the manner of supporting players.

== Cast ==
- Lil Dagover as Lottie Corlaix
- Walter Huston as Captain Corlaix
- Warren William as Lieutenant D'Ortelles
- John Wray as Commander Brambourg
- George E. Stone as Le Duc
- Robert Warwick as Mobraz
- Matt McHugh Chief Petty Officer Vincent
- Frederick Burton as President of court-martial
- Frank Leigh as Pilot
- Francis McDonald as Karkuff
- Warner Richmond as Fourdylis
- Reginald Barlow as Defense attorney

== Critical reception ==
The Film Daily wrote that the film comprised a "weak story overloaded with talk and very little action." It wrote, "Lil Dagover, the alluring European actress, makes her English talker debut in a sadly ineffective melodrama that swamps both her and the other members of the cast in about the biggest overdose of talk that has been crammed into any recent picture."

== Other works based on the play ==
The play on which the film is based, Claude Farrère's and Lucien Népoty's Veille d'Armes (also listed as Veilles d'Armes) was adapted by Michael Morton and titled In the Night Watch upon its London opening on December 21, 1918, and its New York debut on January 29, 1921. The 1921 Broadway production by the Shubert brothers starred Jeanne Eagels, with Robert Warwick (playing a sixth-billed supporting character in the film) in Walter Huston's role of the husband and Edmund Lowe in the Warren William part of the lovestruck lieutenant. It provided the plot line for a 1925 French silent directed by Jacques de Baroncelli and distributed as Before the Battle in the English-speaking world. An American silent version was released in 1928 under the title Night Watch, directed by Alexander Korda, with stars Billie Dove and Paul Lukas. Three years after the release of The Woman from Monte Carlo, another French version, directed by Marcel L'Herbier, with stars Annabella and Victor Francen, was released and subsequently marketed in English-speaking countries as Sacrifice of Honor.
