= Elisabeth of Austria (film) =

1931 film

- Directed by: Adolf Trotz
- Written by: Georg C. Klaren; Adolf Lantz; Alfred Schirokauer
- Starring: Lil Dagover; Paul Otto; Maria Matray
- Cinematography: Frederik Fuglsang
- Edited by: Géza Pollatschik
- Music by: Felix Günther
- Production company: Gottschalk Tonfilm
- Distributed by: Union-Film
- Release date: 21 July 1931
- Running time: 84 minutes
- Country: Germany
- Language: German

Elisabeth of Austria (German: Elisabeth von Österreich) is a 1931 German historical drama film directed by Adolf Trotz and starring Lil Dagover, Paul Otto, and Maria Matray. It is a biopic of Empress Elisabeth of Austria. It was shot at the EFA Studios in Berlin with sets designed by the art director Franz Schroedter.

== Plot ==
Empress Elizabeth of Austria (Lil Dagover) is a free spirit expected to conform herself in a regal manner and wed to Franz Joseph (Paul Otto) . Elizabeth cannot stand her royal life and all its protocol and decides to run away from the royal court to live a carefree existence among the people.

== Cast ==
- Lil Dagover as Elisabeth of Austria
- Paul Otto as Franz Joseph
- Maria Matray as Fanny Angerer
- Charlotte Ander as Mary Vetsera
- Ekkehard Arendt as Crown Prince Rudolph
- Ida Perry as Archduchess Sophie
- Ludwig Stössel as Bratfisch
- Sergius Sax as Crown Prince Ludwig
- Ida Wüst as Jolanda Szoerek
- Eugen Burg
- Michael von Newlinsky
- Olga Limburg
- Toni Tetzlaff
- Henry Berg
- Robert Leffler
- Magnus Stifter
- Bernd Aldor
- Gustl Gstettenbaur
- Fritz Greiner

== Bibliography ==
- Bock, Hans-Michael; Bergfelder, Tim, eds. (2009). The Concise Cinegraph: Encyclopaedia of German Cinema. New York: Berghahn Books. ISBN 978-1-57181-655-9.
