= The Eyes of the Mask =

1920 film

- Directed by: Karl Gerhardt
- Written by: Wolfgang Geiger
- Produced by: Rudolf Meinert; Erich Pommer
- Starring: Lil Dagover
- Production company: Decla-Bioscop
- Distributed by: Decla-Bioscop
- Release date: 17 December 1920
- Country: Germany
- Languages: Silent; German intertitles

The Eyes of the Mask (German: Die Augen der Maske) is a 1920 German silent film directed by Karl Gerhardt and starring Lil Dagover.

== Cast ==
- Lil Dagover
- Ally Kay

== Bibliography ==
- Behr, Shulamith; Fanning, David; Jarman, Douglas, eds. (1993). Expressionism Reassessed. Manchester: Manchester University Press. ISBN 978-0-7190-3844-0.
