= Revenge Is Mine =

- Directed by: Alwin Neuß
- Written by: Fritz Lang
- Produced by: Erich Pommer
- Starring: Paul Otto; Lil Dagover
- Production company: Decla-Film
- Release date: 1919
- Country: Germany
- Languages: Silent; German intertitles

Revenge Is Mine (German: Die Rache ist mein) is a 1919 German silent film directed by Alwin Neuß and starring Paul Otto and Lil Dagover.

== Cast ==
- Paul Otto
- Alwin Neuß
- Arnold Czempin
- Helga Molander
- Lil Dagover
- Hanni Reinwald

== Bibliography ==
- Hardt, Ursula. From Caligari to California: Erich Pommer's Life in the International Film Wars. Berghahn Books, 1996.
- McGilligan, Patrick. Fritz Lang: The Nature of the Beast. University of Minnesota Press, 2013.
