= Siegfried Dessauer =

German actor, film director and screenwriter

- Born: 20 September 1874; Berlin, German Empire
- Died: 1956 (aged 81–82); Sydney, Australia
- Occupations: Director, Writer
- Years active: 1919-1933 (film )

Siegfried Dessauer (1874–1956) was a German screenwriter and film director. As a Jew he was expelled from the Nazi Reich Chamber of Film in 1938. Until February 1945 he lived in Wittenau, then moved to Hermsdorf. After the Second World War he emigrated to Australia in 1947.

== Selected filmography ==
- Hotel Atlantik (1920)
- Shame (1922)
- The Captain from Koepenick (1926)

== Bibliography ==
- Prawer, S.S. Between Two Worlds: The Jewish Presence in German and Austrian Film, 1910-1933. Berghahn Books, 2005.
