= Love Is Blind (1925 film) =

1925 film

- Conrad Veidt (l), Lil Dagover (c) and Georg Alexander (r)
- Directed by: Lothar Mendes
- Written by: Robert Liebmann; Viktor Léon
- Produced by: Erich Pommer
- Starring: Lil Dagover; Conrad Veidt; Lillian Hall-Davis
- Cinematography: Werner Brandes
- Production company: UFA
- Distributed by: UFA
- Release date: 2 October 1925
- Running time: 74 minutes
- Country: Germany
- Languages: Silent; German intertitles

Love Is Blind (German: Liebe macht blind) is a 1925 German silent comedy film directed by Lothar Mendes and starring Lil Dagover, Conrad Veidt and Lillian Hall-Davis. It was shot at the Babelsberg Studios in Berlin. The film's sets were designed by Hans Jacoby. It was produced and distributed by UFA, Germany's largest film company of the Weimar Era.

== Cast ==
- Lil Dagover as Diane
- Conrad Veidt as Dr. Lamare
- Lillian Hall-Davis as Evelyn
- Georg Alexander as Viktor
- Emil Jannings as Emil Jannings
- Jenny Jugo as Medium
- Jack Trevor as Filmregisseur
- Alexander Murski

== Bibliography ==
- Hans-Michael Bock and Tim Bergfelder. The Concise Cinegraph: An Encyclopedia of German Cinema. Berghahn Books.
