= Lilly Flohr =

Austrian actress

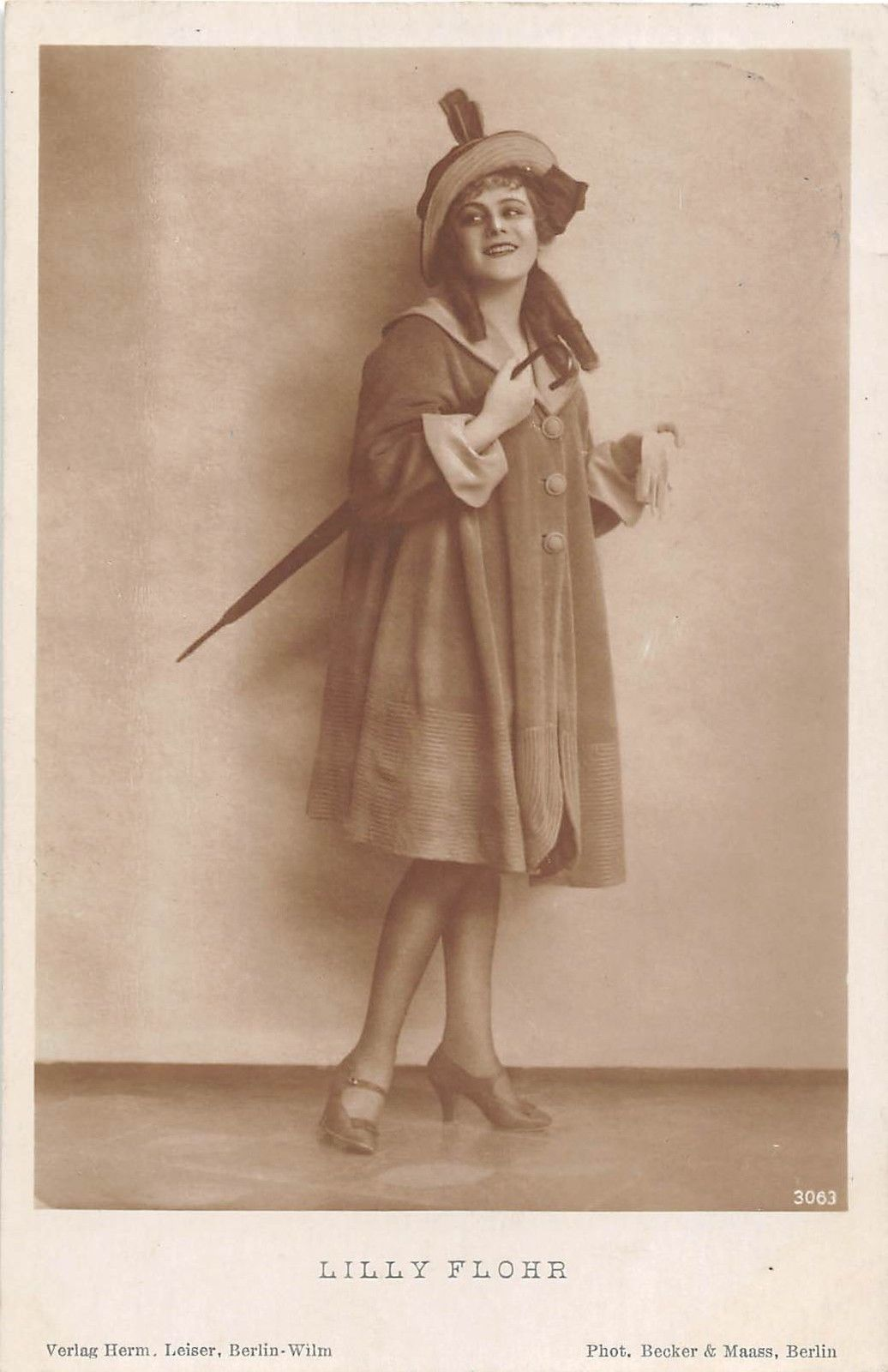
- Flohr, c. 1918
- Born: Elisabeth Flohr; 15 October 1893; Vienna, Austria-Hungary
- Died: 7 July 1978 (aged 84); North Ryde, Australia
- Occupation: Actress
- Years active: 1918–1929 (film)

Lilly Flohr (born Elisabeth Flohr; 15 October 1893 – 7 July 1978) was an Austrian stage and film actress and singer who worked in the German film industry during the silent era.

== Biography ==
Elisabeth Flohr was born on 15 October 1893 into a Jewish family. She grew up in an artistic environment due to her father (Anton Moritz Josef Flohr) being a musician, actor, and painter.

Flohr made her stage debut at the Raimund Theater in Vienna at 8 years old, and trained at the Imperial Conservatory. From 1915 to 1916 she performed at the Theater am Schiffbauerdamm, and from 1917 to 1919 she was employed at the Berliner Theater, where she also acted as the title role in the world premiere of Walter Kollo's operetta The Great Komtess.

In 1912, she married the merchant Sigmund Günzburger (1882 – ?) in Frankfurt am Main; the marriage ended in divorce in 1919. She maintained the stage name Lilly Flohr, and made her film debut in A Song of Hate and Love (1918), followed by Die Erbin (1918), and The Girl from Acker Street (1920).

She became a popular actress in the 1920s, starring in films such as The House in Dragon Street (1921), How The Girl From Acker Street Found a Home (1921), which was the sequel to The Girl from Acker Street, Shame (1922), Fridericus Rex (1922), and Children of the Street (1928).

Flohr was unable to make the transition to sound films, which resulted in her retiring from the film industry, and returning to the stage.

In 1934, Flohr was banned from performing in Germany due to her Jewish identity. Following the Anschluss in 1938, she emigrated to Shanghai, where she continued her stage career alongside other German-speaking emigrants.

She later moved to Australia, where she died on 7 July 1978. She is buried at Northern Suburbs Memorial Gardens.

== Selected filmography ==
- The Girl from Acker Street (1920)
- The House in Dragon Street (1921)
- A Day on Mars (1921)
- Shame (1922)
- The Diadem of the Czarina (1922)
- Fratricide (1922)
- Fridericus Rex (1922)
- The Salesgirl from the Fashion Store (1925)
- Reveille: The Great Awakening (1925)
- Children of the Street (1929)

== Bibliography ==
- Dietrich Scheunemann. Expressionist Film: New Perspectives. Camden House, 2006.
