= The Invisible Front =

1932 film directed by Richard Eichberg

- Directed by: Richard Eichberg
- Written by: Robert A. Stemmle; Curt Siodmak; Max W. Kimmich
- Produced by: Joe Pasternak
- Starring: Trude von Molo; Karl Ludwig Diehl; Theodor Loos
- Cinematography: Bruno Mondi
- Edited by: Willy Zeunert
- Music by: Hans May
- Production company: Deutsche Universal-Film
- Distributed by: Deutsche Universal-Film
- Release date: 23 December 1932
- Running time: 85 minutes
- Country: Germany
- Language: German

The Invisible Front (German: Die unsichtbare Front) is a 1932 German spy thriller film directed by Richard Eichberg and starring Trude von Molo, Karl Ludwig Diehl, Veit Harlan and Paul Hörbiger. The story was written by Robert A. Stemmle, Curt Siodmak and Max W. Kimmich, who also presented the idea of this film to his colleagues. It was made at the Johannisthal Studios in Berlin and on location in Hamburg. The film's sets were designed by the art directors Artur Günther and Willi Herrmann.

The location shooting started on 7 October 1932, while the studio shooting began only two weeks later, on 21 October 1932. The final movie passed censorship on 22 December 1932 and made its debut just a day later in Berlin's Capitol cinema.

== Plot ==
During World War I, young Ellen Lange runs away from her boarding school in Hamburg, because she cannot stand its strict rules any longer, and escapes to her brother Rolf, who lives in Kiel. Rolf, a naval officer, is not too enthusiastic about Ellen's arrival, because he has to go to England by secret orders. So he tries to convince her to go back to her boarding school, and when they both separate at the station, he is convinced that she will do so. But Ellen is unwilling to give up her new freedom again, so she takes another train to Berlin instead. During the journey, she meets a young girl that promises to help her find a job in Berlin. She also provides Ellen with the address of "Aunt Jenny", a dubious lady who finally gets her a job in a music store. After her three months of probation, Mr. Hansen, her boss, orders Ellen to take a precious violin to Copenhagen. He also provides her with a false passport, as Ellen does not have any identity papers.

Only after her arrival at Copenhagen, Ellen learns that she has not only transported the violin, but also secret strategic papers that were stolen in Berlin. She also meets Erik Larsen, a German secret service agent who works under cover at the Lyra publishing house, which turns out to be the hub of the enemy's espionage ring. After that, she decides to work for the German secret service to make up for her fault. As a first step, after returning to Berlin, she tells German counterespionage about the music shop in Copenhagen, and its operatives are rounded up shortly afterwards. Then Ellen learns that the papers she smuggled out of the country have led to the destruction of her brother's submarine. Deeply affected by his death, she gives in to Larsen to take on to another spying assignment with him which leads them both via Copenhagen to London. When they are invited to a ball at the American military delegation there, Ellen manages to distract Colonel Stanley long enough for Larsen to search the colonel's desk and to steal important papers from it. But when the boss of Lyra publishing house arrives at the party, he recognizes her and gets her arrested. During a German airship attack, Larsen is able to free her again, but while the two are attempting to escape, in a final irony Ellen is fatally injured by the fragment of a German bomb.

== Cast ==
- Karl Ludwig Diehl as Erik Larsen
- Trude von Molo as Ellen Lange
- Alexa Engström as Mabel May
- John Mylong as Rolf Lange
- Theodor Loos as Henrik Thomsen
- Helmuth Kionka as Fred Holger
- Paul Otto as Capt. William Roberts
- Erik Werntgen as Oberleutnant Brown
- Veit Harlan as Friseur Jonny
- Ernst Dernburg as Oberst John Stanley
- Michael von Newlinsky as Oberleutnant Wilton
- Paul Bildt as Prof. Hardy
- Werner Pledath as Chef des deutschen Geheimdienstes in Berlin
- Paul Hörbiger as Kommisssar Borgmann
- Willi Schur as Paul Hansen
- Rosa Valetti as Tante Jenny
- Trude Berliner as Trude
- Vera Witt as Vorsteherin des Pensionats
- Otto Kronburger as Kriminalkommissar
- Harry Hardt as Kriminalkommissar
- Carl Auen as Kapitänleutnant des U-Bootes
- Horst Obermüller as Kapitänleutnant eines andern U-Bootes
- Viktor de Kowa
- Edith Meinhard
- F.W. Schröder-Schrom
- Ida Wüst

== Bibliography ==
- Kester, Bernadette. Film Front Weimar: Representations of the First World War in German films of the Weimar Period (1919-1933). Amsterdam University Press, 2003.
