= Always Be True and Faithful =

1927 film

- Directed by: Reinhold Schünzel
- Written by: Alfred Schirokauer; Reinhold Schünzel
- Starring: Reinhold Schünzel; Rosa Valetti; Julius E. Herrmann
- Cinematography: Edgar S. Ziesemer
- Music by: Giuseppe Becce
- Production company: Reinhold Schünzel Film
- Distributed by: Parufamet
- Release date: 30 September 1927
- Running time: 104 minutes
- Country: Germany
- Languages: Silent; German intertitles

Always Be True and Faithful (German: Üb' immer Treu' und Redlichkeit) is a 1927 German silent comedy film directed by Reinhold Schünzel and starring Reinhold Schünzel, Rosa Valetti and Julius E. Herrmann. It was shot at the Babelsberg Studios in Potsdam. The film's sets were designed by the art directors Emil Hasler and Oscar Friedrich Werndorff. It premiered at the Gloria-Palast in Berlin and was distributed through the Parufamet arrangement.

== Cast ==
- Reinhold Schünzel as Orje Duff
- Rosa Valetti as Fedora Bratfisch, Karussellbesitzerin
- Julius E. Herrmann as Anton Rabach, Inhaber eines Modellhauses
- Lydia Potechina as Friderike Rabach, Antons Frau
- Ernst Hofmann as Kasimir Rabach, beider Sohn
- Toni Philippi as Laetitia Della Casa
- Sig Arno as Poldi Meindl
- Margot Landa as Christine Bleibtreu
- Yvette Darnys as Yvette, Revuestar
- Kurt Gerron as Yvettes Mann
- Paul Westermeier as Karl, Hausdiener bei Rabach
- Hans Albers
- Ferdinand Bonn
- Gaston Briese

== Bibliography ==
- Bock, Hans-Michael; Bergfelder, Tim, eds. (2009). The Concise Cinegraph: Encyclopaedia of German Cinema. New York: Berghahn Books. ISBN 978-1-57181-655-9.
- Jacobsen, Wolfgang. Babelsberg: ein Filmstudio 1912-1992. Argon, 1992
