= Detektiv Braun =

1914 film

- Directed by: Rudolf Meinert
- Written by: Arthur Conan Doyle (novel); Richard Oswald
- Produced by: Jules Greenbaum
- Starring: Alwin Neuß; Friedrich Kühne
- Release date: 10 December 1914 (Denmark)
- Country: Germany
- Languages: Silent; German intertitles

Detektiv Braun (English: Detective Brown) is a 1914 German silent crime film directed by Rudolf Meinert and starring Alwin Neuß and Friedrich Kühne. It was part of a series of German films featuring Neuß as Arthur Conan Doyle's Sherlock Holmes.

== Cast ==
- Alwin Neuß as Sherlock Holmes
- Friedrich Kühne as Stapleton
