= Street Acquaintances =

Street Acquaintances may refer to:

- Street Acquaintances (1948 film), a German drama film
- Street Acquaintances (1929 film), a Czech-German silent film
