= Clown Charly =

- Directed by: Alwin Neuß
- Starring: Lil Dagover
- Cinematography: Carl Hoffmann
- Music by: Giuseppe Becce
- Production company: Decla-Film
- Distributed by: Decla-Film
- Release date: 13 September 1918
- Country: Germany
- Languages: Silent; German intertitles

Clown Charly is a 1918 German silent film directed by Alwin Neuß and starring Lil Dagover.

== Cast ==
- Lil Dagover
- Karl Falkenberg
- Alwin Neuß

== Bibliography ==
- Hans-Michael Bock and Tim Bergfelder. The Concise Cinegraph: An Encyclopedia of German Cinema. Berghahn Books.
