= The House in Dragon Street =

1921 film directed by Richard Oswald

- Directed by: Richard Oswald
- Written by: Paul Merzbach
- Produced by: Richard Oswald
- Starring: Edmund Löwe; Werner Krauss; Lilly Flohr; Paul Bildt
- Cinematography: Willy Goldberger
- Production company: Richard-Oswald-Produktion
- Release date: 24 June 1921
- Country: Germany
- Languages: Silent; German intertitles

The House in Dragon Street (German: Das Haus in der Dragonerstrasse) is a 1921 German silent crime film directed by Richard Oswald and starring Edmund Löwe, Werner Krauss and Lilly Flohr. The film premiered in Berlin on 24 June 1921.

== Cast ==
- Edmund Löwe as Der alte Uhl
- Werner Krauss as Walter, sein Sohn
- Lilly Flohr as Lia, seine Tochter
- Paul Bildt as Zigarrenhändler Paulsen
- Ellen Bargi as Martha, seine Frau
- Eugen Jensen as Der Junggeselle
- Aenne Ullstein as Ein Mädchen, Walters Freundin
- Theodor Loos as Funke, Lias Bräutigam

== Bibliography ==
- Grange, William. Cultural Chronicle of the Weimar Republic.Scarecrow Press, 2008.
