= The Hotel of the Dead =

1921 film

- German: Das tote Hotel
- Directed by: Martin Hartwig
- Written by: Walter Wassermann; Richard Wilde (writer)
- Starring: Albert Steinrück; Fritz Beckmann; Rosa Valetti; Gertrude W. Hoffman
- Cinematography: Johannes Männling
- Production company: Basta-Film
- Distributed by: Terra Film
- Release date: 12 August 1921
- Country: Germany
- Languages: Silent; German intertitles

The Hotel of the Dead (German: Das tote Hotel) is a 1921 German silent thriller film directed by Martin Hartwig and starring Albert Steinrück, Fritz Beckmann and Rosa Valetti. It premiered in Berlin on 13 August 1921.

== Cast ==
- Albert Steinrück as Senator Petersen
- Fritz Beckman as Lindholm
- Rosa Valetti
- Lya Sellin as Inge
- Gertrude W. Hoffman as Dama
- Alfred Schmasow as Gefängniswärter
- Hermann Picha as Schneider
- Alexander Areuss as Olaf
- Danny Guertler as Peer
- Adele Hartwig as Senator Petersen
- Bernecke Heinz as Jens
- Paul Voissel as Carl
