= The Girl from Acker Street =

1920 film

- Directed by: Reinhold Schünzel
- Written by: Ernst Friedrich (novel); Bobby E. Lüthge; Arzén von Cserépy
- Produced by: Arzén von Cserépy
- Starring: Otto Gebühr; Lilly Flohr; Rosa Valetti
- Cinematography: Curt Courant
- Production company: Cserépy-Film
- Release date: 3 May 1920
- Running time: 87 minutes
- Country: Germany
- Languages: Silent; German intertitles

The Girl from Acker Street (German: Das Mädchen aus der Ackerstraße) is a 1920 German silent drama film directed by Reinhold Schünzel and starring Otto Gebühr, Lilly Flohr, and Rosa Valetti. It was followed by two sequels directed by Werner Funck and Martin Hartwig respectively.

The film's sets were designed by the art director Fritz Seyffert.

== Cast ==
- Otto Gebühr as Ernst Albrecht
- Lilly Flohr as Ella Schulze, Stieftochter
- Rosa Valetti as Mutter Schulze
- Reinhold Schünzel as Franz, Diener im Hause Albrecht
- Hansi Burg as Gertrud Fischer
- Olga Engl as Frau Fischer
- Ferdinand von Alten as Assessor König
- Vladimir Agayev as Maler Petersen
- Fritz Beckmann as Wirt
- Leonhard Haskel as Arbeiter
- Hans Junkermann as Geheimrat Fischer
- Albert Steinrück as Vater Schulze
- Mathilde Wieder as Haushälterin

== Bibliography ==
- Prawer, Siegbert Salomon (2007) [2005]. Between Two Worlds: The Jewish Presence in German and Austrian Film, 1910–1933. New York: Berghahn Books. ISBN 978-1-84545-303-9.
