= The Hymn of Leuthen =

1933 film directed by Carl Froelich

- German film poster
- German: Der Choral von Leuthen
- Directed by: Carl Froelich; Arzén von Cserépy
- Written by: Johannes Brandt; Friedrich Pflughaupt; Ilse Spath-Baron
- Based on: Fridericus by Walter von Molo
- Produced by: Carl Froelich
- Starring: Otto Gebühr; Olga Chekhova; Elga Brink
- Cinematography: Franz Planer; Hugo von Kaweczynski
- Edited by: Oswald Hafenrichter; Gustav Lohse
- Music by: Marc Roland
- Production company: Carl Froelich-Film
- Distributed by: Ufa Film Company (US)
- Release date: 3 February 1933
- Running time: 91 minutes
- Country: Germany
- Language: German

The Hymn of Leuthen (German: Der Choral von Leuthen) is a 1933 German film depicting Frederick the Great, directed by Carl Froelich starring Otto Gebühr, Olga Chekhova and Elga Brink. It was part of the cycle of nostalgic Prussian films popular during the Weimar and Nazi eras. The title refers to the 1757 Battle of Leuthen.

The film was loosely based on the novel Fridericus by Walter von Molo. It presented Frederick as an inspired leader. It was shot at the Tempelhof Studios in Berlin. The film's sets were designed by the art director Franz Schroedter.

== Cast ==
- Otto Gebühr as King Frederick II of Prussia
- Olga Chekhova as Countess Mariann
- Elga Brink as Comtesse Charlotte von Mudrach
- Harry Frank as Captain Hans von Wustrow
- Paul Otto as Prince Heinrich
- Hans Adalbert Schlettow as Herzog Moritz von Dessau
- John Mylong as Gen. Seydlitz
- Hugo Froelich as Gen. von Möllendorf
- Werner Finck as Christian Kandidat der Theologie
- Josef Dahmen as Georg - soldier
- Veit Harlan as Paul - soldier
- Walter Janssen as Count Daun
- Paul Richter as Herzog Karl von Lothringen
- Anton Pointner as Pandurenoberst Rawitsch
- Otto Hartmann as Coronet
- Ludwig Trautmann as Austrian officer
- Fritz Spira as Austrian officer
- Oskar Marion as Austrian officer
- Wolfgang Staudte as Saxon officer

== Production ==
Johannes Brandt and Ilse Spath-Baron wrote a screenplay based on an idea by Friedrich Pflughaupt, who was loosely adapting the themes of Walter von Molo's Fridericus. The music was composed by Marc Roland.

== Release ==
The film was approved by the censors on 30 January 1933, and premiered on 3 February. It premiered four days after Adolf Hitler became chancellor of the Reich.

== Works cited ==
- Waldman, Harry (2008). Nazi Films In America, 1933-1942. McFarland & Company. ISBN 9780786438617.
- Welch, David (1983). Propaganda and the German Cinema: 1933-1945. I.B. Tauris. ISBN 9781860645204.

== Bibliography ==
- Klaus, Ulrich J. Deutsche Tonfilme: Jahrgang 1933. Klaus-Archiv, 1988.
