= Shell Shock Cinema =

2009 book by Anton Kaes

- Author: Anton Kaes
- Language: English
- Publisher: Princeton University Press
- Publication date: 24 August 2009
- Publication place: United States
- Pages: 328
- ISBN: 9781400831197

Shell Shock Cinema: Weimar Culture and the Wounds of War is a 2009 book by the German film studies scholar Anton Kaes. It argues that the German trauma of World War I had a major impact on cinema of the Weimar Republic and is expressed also in famous films that do not depict the war. These include The Cabinet of Dr. Caligari, Nosferatu, Die Nibelungen and Metropolis, which Kaes does close readings of.

The book received the Limina Award for Best International Film Studies Book from the University of Udine's Film Forum conference.

== See also ==
- List of German films of 1919–1932
