= Waterloo (1929 film) =

1929 film directed by Karl Grune

- Directed by: Karl Grune
- Written by: Max Ferner; Bobby E. Lüthge
- Produced by: Max Schach
- Starring: Charles Willy Kayser; Charles Vanel; Otto Gebühr
- Cinematography: Hugo von Kaweczynski; Fritz Arno Wagner; Josef Wirsching
- Music by: Hansheinrich Dransmann
- Production company: Bavaria Film
- Distributed by: Bavaria Film
- Release date: January 1929
- Running time: 120 minutes
- Country: Germany
- Languages: Silent; German intertitles

Waterloo is a 1929 German silent war film directed by Karl Grune and starring Charles Willy Kayser, Charles Vanel and Otto Gebühr. It depicts the victory of the Seventh coalition over Napoleon at the Battle of Waterloo in 1815.

It was made at the Emelka Studios of Bavaria Film in Munich. The film's sets were designed by the art director Ludwig Reiber.

The film was inspired by Abel Gance's famous epic Napoléon and made use of similar filming techniques.

== Cast ==
- Charles Willy Kayser as Friedrich Wilhelm III
- Charles Vanel as Napoleon
- Otto Gebühr as Feldmarschall Blücher
- Auguste Prasch-Grevenberg as Blücher's Wife
- Friedrich Ulmer as Gneisenau
- Georg Henrich as Hardenberg
- Karl Graumann as Metternich
- Humberston Wright as Wellington
- Carl de Vogt as Ney
- Helmuth Renar as Talleyrand
- Vera Malinovskaya as Gräfin Tarnowska
- Camilla von Hollay as Ihre Zofe
- Oskar Marion as Leutnant Reutlingen
- Betty Bird as Rieke
- Fred Immler as Erster Grenadier
- Franz Scharwenka as Zweiter Grenadier
- Will Dohm as Graf Lagarde

== Bibliography ==
- Bock, Hans-Michael & Bergfelder, Tim. The Concise Cinegraph: Encyclopaedia of German Cinema. Berghahn Books, 2009.
