= Alwin Neuß =

German actor and film director

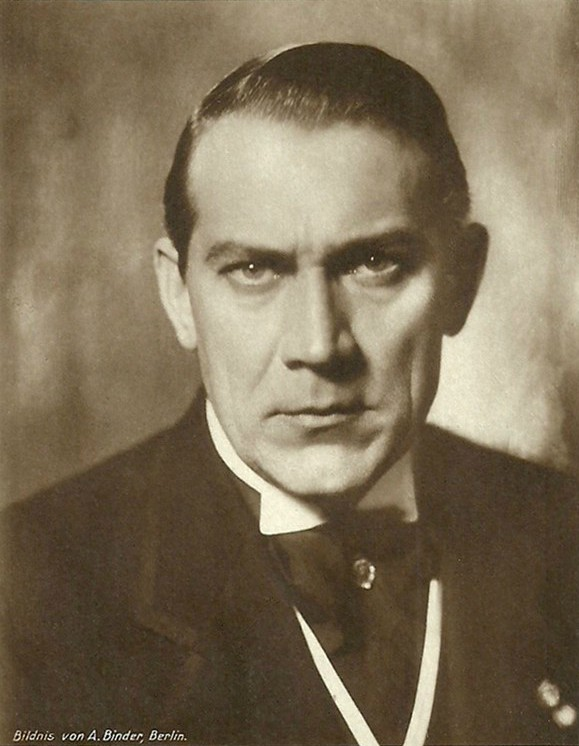
- Neuß, ca. 1928
- Born: Carl Alwin Heinrich Neuß; 17 June 1879; Cologne, German Empire
- Died: 30 October 1935 (aged 56); Berlin, Nazi Germany
- Other names: Alwin Neuss
- Occupations: Actor, film director
- Years active: 1906–1930
- Spouse: Anna Klara Warczok

Carl Alwin Heinrich Neuß (17 June 1879 – 30 October 1935) was a German film director and actor, noted for playing Sherlock Holmes in a series of silent films during the 1910s. He also played the dual role of Jekyll and Hyde in the 1910 Danish silent film version of Dr. Jekyll and Mr. Hyde, directed by August Blom. He played Jekyll and Hyde again in the 1914 German silent film Ein Seltsamer Fall (translation: A Strange Case), scripted by Richard Oswald.

== Selected filmography ==
- Sherlock Holmes (1908)
- Dr. Jekyll and Mr. Hyde (Danish silent film, 1910)
- Hamlet (1911)
- The Flight (1912)
- Ein Seltsamer Fall (1914) a German film adaptation of Dr. Jekyll and Mr. Hyde
- Detektiv Braun (1914)
- Der Hund von Baskerville/ Hound of the Baskervilles (1914) German film directed by Rudolph Meinert
- The Hound of the Baskervilles (1915) rival German film directed by Richard Oswald
- Dynamite (1916)
- The Cowboy (1918)
- The Man From Havelock (1917)
- Clown Charly (1918)
- Bettler GmbH (1919)
- Revenge Is Mine (1919)
- The Diadem of the Czarina (1922)
- By Order of Pompadour (1924)
- Strong Winds (1924)
- Two and a Lady (1926)
- Street Acquaintances (1929)
- The Old Life (1930)
- Dance Into Happiness (1930)

== Bibliography ==
- Hardy, Phil (ed.). The BFI Companion to Crime. Continuum, 1997.
- Workman, Christopher; Howarth, Troy (2016). "Tome of Terror: Horror Films of the Silent Era". Midnight Marquee Press. p. 211. ISBN 978-1936168-68-2.
- Kinnard, Roy (1995). "Horror in Silent Films". McFarland and Company Inc. ISBN 0-7864-0036-6.
