= Cserépy Film =

German film production company

- Founded: 1924
- Founder: Arzén von Cserépy
- Headquarters: Germany
- Production output: Fridericus Rex series

Cserépy Film was a German film production company which operated during the silent era. It was founded by the director Arzén von Cserépy. In 1922, it became affiliated with the much larger Ufa company, and in 1924, it was merged into it entirely. The company was notable for a number of epics it made, particularly the Fridericus Rex series of films about Frederick the Great which enjoyed enormous popularity with Weimar German audiences.

== Bibliography ==
- Kreimeier, Klaus. The UFA Story: A Story of Germany's Greatest Film Company 1918-1945. University of California Press, 1999.
