= Fridericus =

1937 film

- Directed by: Johannes Meyer
- Written by: Walter von Molo (novel); Erich Kröhnke
- Produced by: Hanns Otto
- Starring: Otto Gebühr; Hilde Körber; Lil Dagover
- Cinematography: Bruno Mondi
- Edited by: Fritz C. Mauch
- Music by: Marc Roland
- Production company: Diana-Tonfilm
- Distributed by: Neue Deutsch Lichtspiel-Syndikat Verleih; Tobis Film
- Release date: 8 February 1937
- Running time: 97 minutes
- Country: Germany
- Language: German

Fridericus is a 1937 German historical film directed by Johannes Meyer and starring Otto Gebühr, Hilde Körber and Lil Dagover. It is based on the life of Frederick II of Prussia. It was part of the popular cycle of Prussian films and was shot at the Halensee Studios in Berlin and on location in Brandenburg. The film's sets were designed by the art directors Otto Erdmann and Hans Sohnle.

== Main cast ==
- Otto Gebühr as Friedrich II., König von Preußen
- Hilde Körber as Wilhelmine – seine Schwester
- Lil Dagover as Marquise de Pompadour
- Agnes Straub as Czarina Elisabeth
- Käthe Haack as Maria Theresia
- Bernhard Minetti as Count Wallis, alias Marquis DuVal
- Paul Klinger as von Bonin
- Carola Höhn as Louise – seine Frau
- Paul Dahlke as Field Marshal von Dessau
- Lucie Höflich as Frau Büttner
- Wilhelm König as Hans – ihr Sohn – Student
- Will Dohm as Baron Warkotsch
- Paul Westermeier as Musketeer Mampe
- Heinrich Schroth as Capt. von Droste
- Alfred Gerasch as Field Marshal Daun
- Ernst Schiffner - Austrian Staff-Officer

== Bibliography ==
- Waldman, Harry (2008). Nazi Films in America, 1933–1942. McFarland. ISBN 978-0-7864-3861-7.
