= Antonio Rinaldi (choreographer) =

Italian dancer and choreographer (c. 1715 – c. 1759)

Antonio Rinaldi (c. 1715 – c. 1759), also known as Fossano, Fusano, and Fossan, was an Italian choreographer who worked in Russia. He was a native of Naples, Italy.

In 1733, Rinaldi worked at the San Samuele Theater in Venice. In 1734, he moved to work in London, but returned to Italy in 1735, where he established an operatic dance troupe. In 1736, Russian Empress Anna Ioannovna invited his troupe to perform in Saint Petersburg; Rinaldi accepted the invitation. In Russia, his troupe staged Force of Love and Hatred (Italian: Forza dell'amore e dell'odio or Russian: Сила любви и ненависти), an opera by Francesco Araja. Later, Rinaldi has staged other comedy dancing divertissements.

At the time, the leading ballet personality in St. Petersburg was Jean-Baptiste Landé, who in 1738 organized the first Russian professional ballet school and became its first teacher. Landé and Rinaldi saw each other as rivals.

In 1738, Rinaldi left Russia and returned to Parma, Italy. There he taught Barbara Campanini, known as La Barberina (1721–1799), a famous Italian ballerina and one of the most important ballet dancers of the 18th century.

In 1740, Rinaldi accepted another invitation to come and work in Russia; he arrived to St. Petersburg in 1740 or 1742. There, together with Landé, he was appointed by the court to head its ballet troupe. When Landé died in 1748, Rinaldi remained the only one in charge of the Russian court ballet He held this position until 1759, when he was replaced by Austrian choreographer and dancer Franz Hilverding. His further fate is unknown.

Rinaldo's impact on the development of the Russian ballet was very significant. Yury Bakhrushin, a Soviet ballet historian, characterized Rinaldi's influence on the development of the Russian ballet as enormous. He is considered to be the originator of the "Italian style" in the Russian ballet; a trend which faded only in 1787 upon the arrival of French dancer Charles le Picq to Russia.
