= Walter von Molo =

Austrian writer (1880–1958)

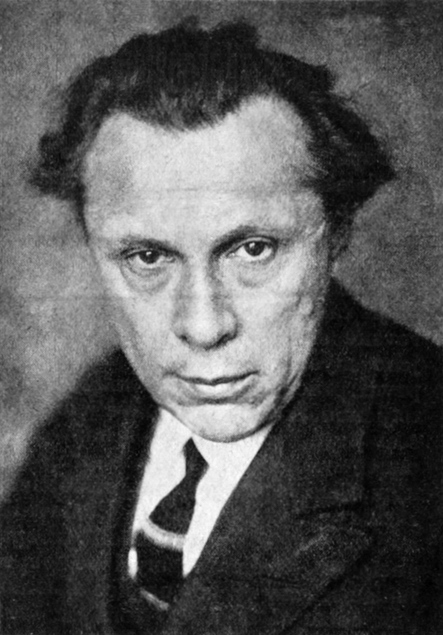
Walter von Molo, 1930

Walter Ritter/Reichsritter von Molo (14 June 1880 – 27 October 1958) was an Austrian writer in the German language.

== Life ==
Walter von Molo was born on 14 June 1880 in Šternberk, Moravia – then in Austria-Hungary, now in the Czech Republic. He spent his youth in Vienna, the capital. At the Technical University of Vienna he studied mechanical and electrical engineering; he married his first wife, Rosa Richter, in 1906, had a son and daughter, and worked until 1913 as an engineer in the Viennese Patent Office. Shortly before the outbreak of the World War I he moved to Berlin to be with his Bavarian parents and rediscover his German roots, just as Berlin was transforming itself into a cultural capital. It was there that he embarked upon his career as a writer.

His first works, published during and shortly after the war, were bestsellers, and he quickly became one of the most popular of all German-speaking authors of the first half of the century. The books included biographies of Friedrich Schiller, Frederick the Great, and Prince Eugen, as well as novels such as Ein Volk wacht auf ("A People Awakes", 1918–21). All were strongly marked by German nationalism.

In 1925 he divorced Rosa, and five years later married Annemarie Mummenhoff.

Molo was a founding member of the German PEN Club, and also, in 1926, of the Prussian Academy of Arts. From 1928 to 1930 he was chairman of the poetry section.

Although von Molo, a pacifist, had no Jewish forebears, he defended the Jews of Germany and Austria, and with the rise of Nazism he repeatedly drew the anger of anti-Semitic organizations. Molo remained a member of the academy after its purging of Jewish members, and on 15 March 1933 he signed a declaration pledging loyalty to the Nazi leaders. In October he was one of the 88 German writers who went so far as to subscribe to the Vow of Most Faithful Allegiance (Gelöbnis treuester Gefolgschaft) to Adolf Hitler. This was the same year that his two children left Germany. (Conrad returned in 1940; Trude did not.) In 1936 Molo wrote the screenplay for the film Fridericus, based on his novel of 1918. During the World War II he wrote articles for the Nazi-controlled newspaper Krakauer Zeitung published in occupied Kraków.

Although Molo's biography of Frederick II of Prussia was praised by the Nazis, he nevertheless came under attack as unvölkisch, ein Judenfreund and Pazifist (he had, for example, effusively praised the work of Erich Maria Remarque), and there were attempts to push him from public life, with the banning of plays, and the suppression of certain books and their removal from libraries. In 1934, to avoid the public spotlight, he resigned from all the learned societies (except the Goethe Society) and moved to Murnau am Staffelsee, where he had bought property two years before. The idea of exile from Germany itself was unthinkable to him. House searches and defamatory articles continued, and in August 1939 he was denaturalised. However, he was co-writer of the movie script The Endless Road. As a result of the harassment, he destroyed, with the help of his second wife Anne Marie, a large part of his private library, including correspondence with Stefan Zweig, books by Thomas and Heinrich Mann bearing personal dedications, and many papers of his colleagues. All this potentially incriminating material ended up at the bottom of his garden pond. He was never placed under "protective custody" (Schutzhaft) as others were.

After the war he would become a bitter critic of the authors who had fled Germany. On 4 August 1945 an open letter from Molo to Thomas Mann, begging him to return from the United States, was published in the Hessischen Post and other newspapers both in Germany and abroad: "Your people, hungering and suffering for a third of a century, has in its innermost core nothing in common with all the misdeeds and crimes, the shameful horrors and lies...." His sentiments were echoed by Frank Thiess, whose own piece would popularise the use of the phrase innere Emigration to describe the choice of some intellectuals to remain in Germany, a phrase Mann himself had used in 1933. Mann responded, on 28 September, in a statement which caused general indignation in Germany, that new books "published in Germany between 1933 and 1945, can be called less than worthless", that exile had been a sacrifice and not an evasion, and that the nation as a whole did bear responsibility for atrocities committed by its leaders.

This unleashed a huge controversy between the exiled authors and the ones who had chosen to remain. Molo claimed that writers who had abandoned Germany forfeited the right to shape its future.

Despite his appointment as honorary chairman of the German Society of Authors, he did not regain his former prominence. He died on 27 October 1958, and his remains were interred in what is now Molo Park in Murnau. Rosa died in 1970, and Annemarie in 1983.

== Works ==
=== Stories and novels ===
- Klaus Tiedmann der Kaufmann, 1909
- Ums Menschentum. Ein Schillerroman, 1912
- Im Titanenkampf. Ein Schillerroman, 1913
- Der Hochzeitsjunker. Ein Rennroman, 1913
- Die Freiheit. Ein Schillerroman, 1914
- Den Sternen zu. Ein Schillerroman, 1916
- Der Große Fritz im Krieg, 1917
- Schiller in Leipzig, 1917
- Die ewige Tragikomödie. Novellistische Studien 1906-1912, 1917
- Fridericus, novel, 1918
- Luise, novel, 1919
- Auf der rollenden Erde, novel, 1923
- Vom alten Fritz. 4 Erzählungen aus dem Leben des großen Königs, 1924
- Bodenmatz, novel, 1925
- Im ewigen Licht, novel, 1926
- Die Legende vom Herrn, 1927
- Hans Amrung und seine Frau und andere Novellen, 1927
- Mensch Luther, novel, 1928
- Die Scheidung. Ein Roman unserer Zeit, 1929
- Ein Deutscher ohne Deutschland. Ein Friedrich List-Roman, 1931
- Holunder in Polen, novel, 1933
- Der kleine Held, novel, 1934
- Eugenio von Savoy. Heimlicher Kaiser des Reichs, novel, 1936
- Geschichte einer Seele, 1938
- Das kluge Mädchen, novel, 1940
- Der Feldmarschall, 1940
- Sie sollen nur des Gesetzes spotten, stories, 1943
- Im Sommer. Eine Lebenssonate, 2 Erzählungen, 1943
- Der Menschenfreund, novel, 1948
- Die Affen Gottes. Roman der Zeit, 1950

=== Plays ===
- Das gelebte Leben, drama in 4 acts, 1911
- Die Mutter, drama in 4 acts, 1914
- Der Infant der Menschheit, drama in 3 acts, 1916
- Die Erlösung der Ethel, tragedy in 4 acts, 1917
- Friedrich Staps. Ein deutsches Volksstück in 4 Aufzügen, 1918
- Der Hauch im All, tragedy in 3 acts, 1918
- Die helle Nacht, play in 3 acts, 1920
- Till Lausebums, romantic comedy in 3 acts, 1921
- Lebensballade, a play in 12 scenes, 1924
- Ordnung im Chaos, play in 8 tableaux, 1928
- Friedrich List. Ein deutsches Prophetenleben in 3 Aufzügen, 1934

=== Screenplays ===
- Fridericus (D, 1936), directed by Johannes Meyer, with Otto Gebühr, Lil Dagover, Hilde Körber, Agnes Straub, Käthe Haack and others
- The Endless Road (D, 1942/43), directed by Hans Schweikart, with Eugen Klöpfer, Eva Immermann, Hedwig Wangel, Alice Treff and others

=== Other writings ===
- Deutsches Volk. Ein Flugblatt in jedes Haus, 1914
- Als ich die bunte Mütze trug. Deutsch-österreichische Studenten-Erinnerungen, 1914
- An unsere Seelen. Drei Flugblätter auf das Kriegsjahr 1914-1915, 1915
- Deutschland und Oesterreich. Kriegsaufsätze, 1915
- Deutsch sein heißt Mensch sein! Notschrei aus deutscher Seele, 1915
- An Frederik van Eeden und Romain Rolland. Offener Brief, 1915
- Sprüche der Seele, 1916
- Im Schritt der Jahrhunderte. Geschichtliche Bilder, 1917
- Italien. Erlebnisse Deutscher in Italien, 1921
- Im Zwielicht der Zeit. Bilder aus unseren Tagen, 1922
- Der deutschen Jugend gesagt, 1929
- Zwischen Tag und Traum. Gesammelte Reden und Aufsätze, 1930
- Deutsche Volksgemeinschaft. Ansprache am 22. März 1932 in Weimar, 1932
- Wie ich Deutschland möchte. Eine Rede über Friedrich List, 1932
- Lob des Leides, 1947
- Zu neuem Tag. Ein Lebensbericht, 1950
- So wunderbar ist das Leben. Erinnerungen und Begegnungen, 1957
- Wo ich Frieden fand. Erlebnisse und Erinnerungen, 1959

== See also ==
- Gottfried Benn
- Thomas Mann
- Frank Thiess
