= Barbara Campanini =

Italian ballerina (1719–1799)

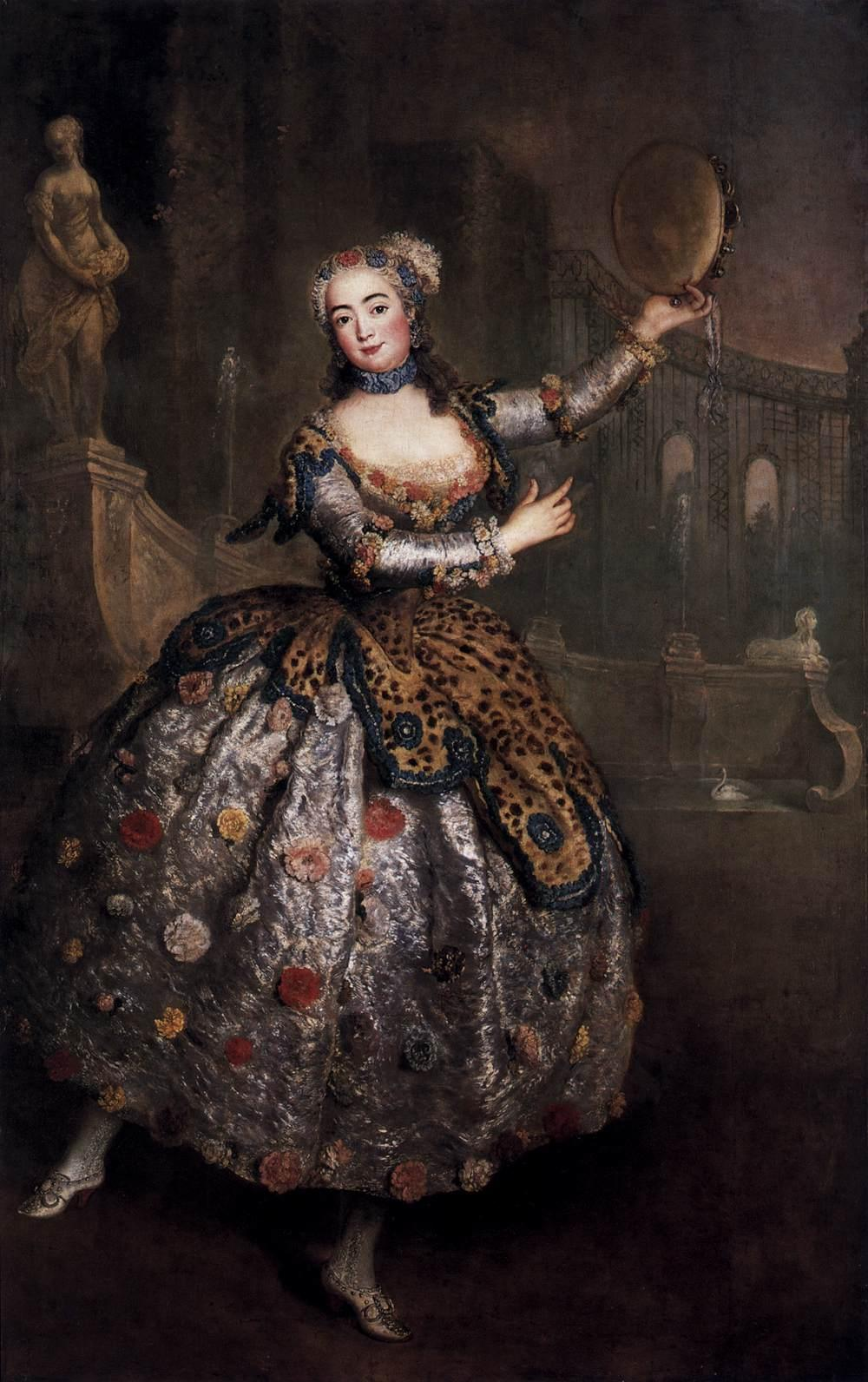
Portrait of the dancer Barbara Campanini, also known as "La Barbarina" (c. 1745) by Antoine Pesne, Charlottenburg Palace

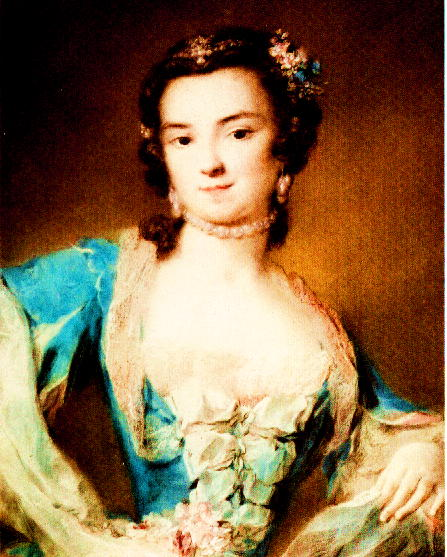
Portrait by Rosalba Carriera, c. 1739 (Staatliche Kunstsammlungen Dresden)

Barbara Campanini, known as La Barbarina (27 September 1719 – 7 June 1799), was an Italian ballerina, one of the most important ballet dancers of the 18th century.

== Career ==
Barbara Campanini was born in Parma. Many biographies say she was born in 1721. Recent research by Andrea Perego sourced the Parma baptismal register showing that she was actually born 27 September 1719. She became a student at Teatro Farnese under the instruction of Antonio Rinaldi Fossano, with whom she gave her debut at the Paris Opera in 1739, which became an immediate success. In 1740, she became well known for her talent not only as a dancer but also as an actress. People began to call her La Barbarina or "The Flying Goddess" because of her impeccable execution of entrechats. After a tour in London she performed in Vienna before she returned to Paris in 1743.

=== Germany ===
She was noted by the young Prussian king Frederick the Great, who offered her a position at the newly erected Court Opera in Berlin, where she performed from 1744 onwards. She appeared in her first performance there on 13 May 1744. Before she arrived, however, she had eloped to Venice with her lover James Stuart-Mackenzie, and King Frederick used political pressure arresting a Venetian envoy to have her turned over to Prussia. Jean-Jacques Rousseau who was a secretary at the French embassy at that time, was involved with her case.

In Berlin, she had a privileged position, demonstrated by the fact that she negotiated her own annual salary of 7,000 Reichsthaler, which was unusually high, and five months vacation a year. The king granted her these terms as long as she stayed unmarried. There were speculations that she had an affair with King Frederick (though the king was reputed to be misogynic), as well as many other persons. She broke her contract suddenly by accepting a proposal by Carl Ludwig von Cocceji, son of the Prussian chancellor Samuel von Cocceji, onstage in 1749, causing a veritable scandal. Her fiancé went to prison, Campanini herself once again eloped to London, but returned to Berlin and secretly married Cocceji. Her spouse was finally pardoned by the king and appointed district governor at Glogau in Silesia, where the couple lived until they were divorced in 1788. The king granted her the title of Countess von Barschau. During her last years, she was active within charity.

Barbara Campanini died on 7 June 1799 at her country estate in Barschau near Lüben, Silesia. She donated her money by will to a foundation for poor noblewomen, which lasted until World War I.

== Sources ==
- Taubert, K.(1998). Barberina, La. In The International Encyclopedia of Dance. : Oxford University Press. Retrieved 20 Feb. 2014, from http://www.oxfordreference.com/view/10.1093/acref/9780195173697.001.0001/acref-9780195173697-e-0130.
- Perego, Andrea. Barbara – Un affare di Stato. Published by Supernova 2020
