= Fred Dunkel =

Friedrich Otto (Fred) Dunkel (31 March 1891 – 16 May 1948) was a journalist, businessman, and filmmaker in Germany and one of the pioneers of the film making industry in Palestine before the establishment of Israel.

== Biography ==
Friedrich Dunkel, a Protestant Christian, was born in Erfurt, Germany. After a period of studies in Zurich and Milan, he began to produce films in Berlin in 1913. During World War I he was recruited into the German army as a driver and eventually was sent to Palestine to serve. On this first encounter with the Middle East he became enchanted with the region. After the war he returned to Berlin to resume work in film. During his frequent visits to a chocolate shop he met and married the daughter of the owner Cyla Anderman, a Jew. He also adopted her daughter Rosa. They lived in Berlin where Dunkel established a film studio and laboratory. In 1932 he documented Hitler's election campaign.

With the rise to power of the Nazis and the laws governing Aryan purity, Dunkel was being forced to divorce his wife because of her Jewish ancestry. Instead he decided to move his family out of Germany. He withdrew a large amount of funds from his bank account and awaited the inevitable visit from the Gestapo. Laws in Germany at that time forbid the transfer of funds out of the country. He told representatives of the Gestapo that he had used the money to pay personal debts and buy new furniture. The Gestapo believed that he had transferred the funds to a Swiss account. Dunkel admitted to having a small account in Switzerland and invited the Gestapo to accompany him to Zurich to confirm his story. His invitation was accepted and the family left Germany, with their money hidden away, escorted over the border by Gestapo agents. Once in Switzerland, the Dunkels were free to leave for Eretz Israel, with their money, while the duped Gestapo agents continued to investigate a bank account that was almost empty.

Arriving in Palestine the family took up residence on 9 Gordon St. in Tel Aviv. Fred opened a film production company which he called Hafilm Ha’Eretz Israeli which was the identical name chosen by Chaim Halachmi, the producer of the first sound film in Palestine. Dunkel established a laboratory dealing with 16 mm, 9.5mm and 8mm stock. He produced, developed and distributed films, as well as renting out equipment and teaching cinematography. He did not learn Hebrew but was registered by the mandatory authorities as a Jew despite the fact that he did not convert to Judaism. He associated with other German speaking immigrants, mostly from the world of arts. He knew Helmar Lerski, director of the films Avodah and Adamah and was friends with filmmaker Yerushalayim Segal and photographer Zoltan Kluger.

While undergoing surgery Dunkel’s wife Cyla died in the early 1940s. Dunkel remarried in 1943 to Martha Herschmann, a Czech refugee who was saved when the illegal immigrant ship Patria was blown up in the port of Haifa. In early 1948 they had a daughter Ruth. Dunkel was very concerned with the family’s safety and economic security. Two days after the declaration of the state, on May 16, 1948, Egyptian planes attacked Tel Aviv. Two bombs fell very close to the Dunkel home while Fred was on the roof viewing the action. He ran to where the baby Ruthie was located, fearing for her life and died of a heart attack next to her cradle. As he was not Jewish the authorities would not bury him in a Jewish cemetery. In the end he was buried in the Catholic cemetery “Terra Sancta” in Jaffa while it was under fire.

== Professional career in Palestine ==
Fred Dunkel’s laboratory was the first in the country to work with 16mm film. Dunkel promoted the use of this film stock finding it to be the most convenient and least expensive to use. From 1939-1944 he worked in cooperation with the Jewish National Fund (JNF) producing films for them. Dunkel was the only filmmaker in the country who had 16mm stock and the equipment to develop color film in his laboratory. He used his unique position to promote himself as the only professional able to deliver the goods in a short period of time. He refused to sell stock to other professionals and would only develop footage for amateurs. Eventually the complaints of other filmmakers forced JNF to sever their ties to him. In his last years he filmed only home movies.

== Selection of his films ==
- Tel Aviv – A short film among the first produced in Palestine to appear in color. The film shows the first Hebrew city and its many sites: boats in the port, street scenes, the central synagogue, Dizengoff square, boating on the Yarkon, and camels walking through the sands. Yehuda Nadivi, the secretary of the city after touring the far east with the film wrote: “I would like to note that the film made a big impression on the viewers, both Jews and non-Jews. Especially in the cities of Bombay, Calcutta, Rangoon and Singapore. The film presented the beauty and color of Tel Aviv in a manner that created a desire to come and visit Tel Aviv and Eretz Israel.”
- Springtime in Galilee – A study on the settlements in the upper Galilee as filmed by Dunkel during spring 1940. The film shows views of the area and different locations in the north. The antiquities at Kfar Nahum (Capernaum), fishermen of the Sea of Galilee, the city of Safad, Rosh Pina, Machanayim, Kibbutz Ein Gev, and Kibbutz Amir. The latter was established a few months earlier during the “Tower and Stockade” operation.
- Aviation, Saraphend – Two film excerpts shot during the 2nd World War depicting the beginnings of the formation a Jewish military fighting unit. The first shows aircraft pilot training in a company called “Aviron” while the second shows the recruitment of Jewish volunteers, born in Eretz Israel, to the British armed forces and their training in Sarafand (now Tzrifin).
- They Find a Home – A film on the hardships encountered by Jewish refugees fleeing from Nazi Germany including their deportation from Germany, their clandestine transport by fragile boats and their absorption into Eretz Israel. The film produced with Keren Hayesod and photographed by Fred Dunkel exposes the cruelty of the Nazi regime. Scenes of harassment of German Jews both authentic and staged appear in the film.
- The People Serve - A film showing the work of Jewish farmers in Eretz Israel working the land while having to defend it. Among pastoral landscapes of working the fields, shepherds and fruitful orchards, there are also rare excerpts depicting the training of the special night squads formed by the Haganah and under the command of the legendary British officer Orde Wingate. These include, probably the only shot in existence of Moshe Dayan with both of his eyes intact.

The collection of Fred Dunkel’s films, deposited in the Steven Spielberg Jewish Film Archive by his daughter Ruth Gazit, includes films documenting the Maccabiah Games, the “illegals” ship “Patria” sinking at Haifa port, Dead Sea works in Kalya and shots of the port in Tel Aviv. In addition there are many home movies photographed by Dunkel in the last months of his life. Most of these star his baby daughter Ruth.
