= Samedi =

Samedi is the French word for Saturday. It may also refer to:

- Baron Samedi, a major loa (spirit) in the vodun/voodoo mythology
- Samedi (World of Darkness), a fictional vampire bloodline in White Wolf Game Studio's Vampire: The Masquerade setting
- Sons of Samedi, a Haitian gang from the 2008 game Saints Row 2
- Samedi the Deafness, a novel by Jesse Ball
- Joseph Samedi (born 1971), Central African Catholic prelate
- Ziya Samedi (1914–2000), Uyghur nationalist writer

== See also ==
- Baron Samedi (disambiguation)
