= Nerves (1919 film) =

- Poster by Josef Fenneker
- Directed by: Robert Reinert
- Written by: Robert Reinert
- Produced by: Robert Reinert
- Starring: Eduard von Winterstein; Lia Borré; Erna Morena
- Cinematography: Helmar Lerski
- Music by: Joachim Bärenz
- Production company: Monumental-Film
- Distributed by: Süddeutsches Filmhaus
- Release date: 22 January 1919
- Running time: 110 minutes
- Country: Germany
- Languages: Silent; German intertitles

Nerves (German: Nerven) is a 1919 German silent film directed by Robert Reinert and starring Eduard von Winterstein, Lia Borré and Erna Morena.

Full film

== Plot ==
In Germany at the end of the First World War, the fates of various people from different social strata are described: the manufacturer Roloff, who has lost his belief in technological progress, the teacher Johannes, who calls for social reform in popular assemblies, and Marja, who turns into a revolutionary to fight against the armed forces. "The fuel that war and need created in people" is portrayed as a "nervous epidemic" that "has affected people and drives them to all kinds of deeds and guilt".

“Young Marja is about to get married to Richard, but has actually loved Johannes since childhood, who has become a kind of mouthpiece for the branded people and demands social reform; when he rejects her love, which he replies but cannot reconcile with his biblical code, she takes revenge by accusing him of rape. Her brother, the factory owner Roloff, who has long since given up his belief in technological progress, swears in court that he has observed the attack: his psyche has long been marked by war and destruction, and soon he will be completely mad. Marja later withdraws the accusation and becomes the leader of a revolutionary group: she wants to build on Johannes' ideology, replaces his pacifist approaches with gun violence. In the end, even Roloff's wife, until then the only person who was perceived to be untouched, goes mad: she sets fire to Johannes' house and kills his blind sister, and then goes to the monastery to do penance. ”

== Cast ==
- Eduard von Winterstein as Fabrikbesitzer Roloff
- Lia Borré as Roloffs Frau Elisabeth
- Erna Morena as Roloffs Schwester Marja
- Paul Bender as Lehrer Johannes
- Lili Dominici as Dessen blinde Schwester
- Rio Ellbon as Marjas Verlobter Richard
- Margarete Tondeur as Marjas frühere Amme
- Paul Burgen as Mann in den Visionen

== Bibliography ==
- Shulamith Behr, David Fanning & Douglas Jarman. Expressionism Reassessed. Manchester University Press, 1993.
