= Paul Bender (bass) =

German opera singer

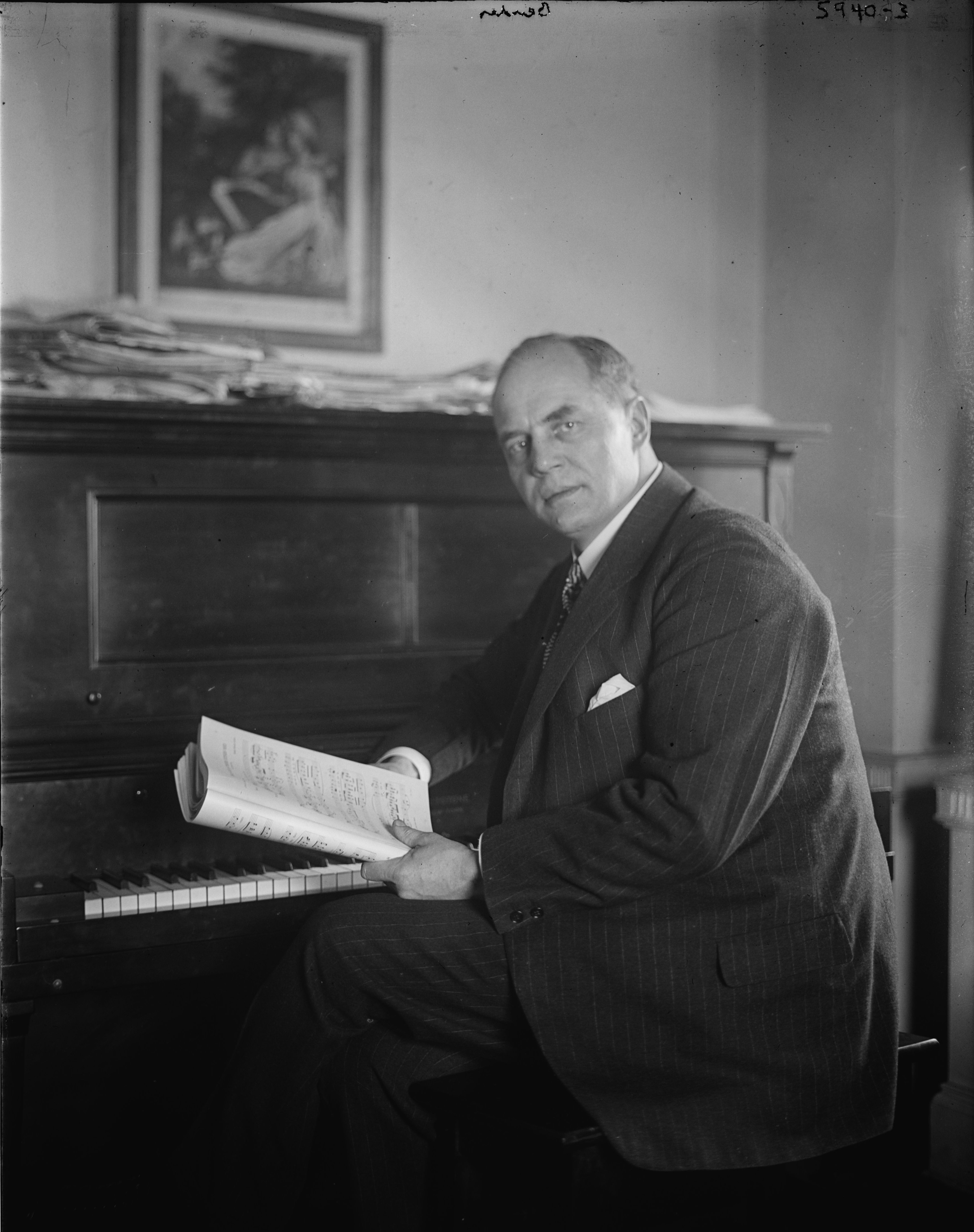
Bender c. 1920–1925

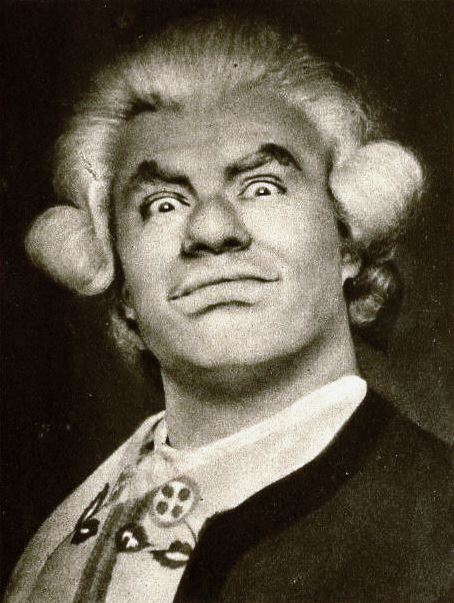
As the Baron Ochs von Lerchenau in Der Rosenkavalier, from a 1923 magazine

Paul Bender (28 July 1875 – 25 November 1947) was a German operatic bass.

== Life ==
Born in Driedorf, Westerwald, as the son of a Protestant minister, Bender began his vocal training while studying medicine in Berlin. His music instructors were Luise Ress and Baptist Hoffmann. Already by 1900, Bender made his stage debut at the Breslau Opera. In 1903 he moved to the Münchner Hofoper, where he remained for the rest of his life, in September 1943 celebrating his 40-year anniversary as a member of the ensemble. Altogether he trod the stage more than 2000 times.

In Munich, Bender sang practically all the important bass roles and also performed as a Heldenbariton. His repertory altogether included not fewer than 118 roles. He took part in many premieres, among them Le donne curiose in 1903 and I quatro rusteghi in 1906, both by Ermanno Wolf-Ferrari. He shone as Pope Pius V in the first performances of Hans Pfitzner's Palestrina in 1917 at the Prinzregententheater. Other premieres were Die Gespenstersonate by Julius Weismann (1930), Das Herz by Hans Pfitzner (1931) and Der Mond by Carl Orff (1939).

From 1902 Bender was a regular guest of the Richard-Wagner-Festspiele in Bayreuth. His reputation sealed by guest appearances at Théàtre de la Monnaie Brussels (1910), Théâtre des Champs-Élysées Paris (1914), the Vienna State Opera or Hofoper (1916–17), Covent Garden Opera London (1910–1914), and Stadttheater Zürich (1915), from 1922 to 1927 he was invited to the Metropolitan Opera in New York. In 1926 Bender was a guest at the Salzburger Festspiele, and in 1938 and 1939 performed in Der Ring des Nibelungen at La Scala.

Lieder and concert singing was also a great passion of Bender's, even before being named Royal Bavarian Kammersänger in 1907. As a singer of narrative ballads he was lauded as a successor to Eugen Gura. In neither opera nor concert singing did Bender rely on his impressive voice alone; for him the dramatic element was always important. The extent of his mimetic gift can be judged from his playing of a principal role in one of the most significant expressionistic silent films, 1919's Nerven by Robert Reinert. (This film dramatized the misery of the postwar era so powerfully that audiences became hysterical and the work was banned.)

The singer appeared on the stage till shortly before his death. In the 1930s and 40s he was primarily busy as a professor at the Münchner Akademie der Tonkunst (now part of the Hochschule für Musik und Theater). Among his pupils belong Josef Greindl and Hans Hopf. Bender married the soprano Paula Brand, who thereafter gave up her career. Bender died in Munich and his grave is in the Munich Waldfriedhof.

== Selected roles ==
Throughout nearly five decades on stage he made the most important bass roles his own, always knowing how to subordinate vocal virtuosity to the higher commandments of a unified artistic goal. He was especially impressive with characters that allowed him to embody human nobility, worth and greatness ...

— Wilhelm Zentner, in MGG, first edition, vol. 15

- Die Zauberflöte (Wolfgang Amadeus Mozart): Sarastro
- Die Entführung aus dem Serail (Wolfgang Amadeus Mozart): Osmin
- Don Giovanni (Wolfgang Amadeus Mozart): Commendatore
- Das Rheingold (Richard Wagner): Fasolt; Fafner
- Götterdämmerung (Richard Wagner): Hagen
- Tristan und Isolde (Richard Wagner): König Marke
- Die Meistersinger von Nürnberg (Richard Wagner): Veit Pogner; Hans Sachs
- Parsifal (Richard Wagner): Gurnemanz; Amfortas
- Tannhäuser (Richard Wagner): Landgraf
- Der fliegende Holländer (Richard Wagner): Daland
- Der Barbier von Sevilla (Gioachino Rossini): Basilio
- Der Waffenschmied (Albert Lortzing): Hans Stadinger
- Martha (Friedrich von Flotow): Plumkett
- Der Barbier von Bagdad (Peter Cornelius): Barbier
- Der Rosenkavalier (Richard Strauss): Ochs von Lerchenau
- Don Quichotte (Jules Massenet): Don Quichotte
- Fidelio (Ludwig van Beethoven): Rocco
- Der Mond (Carl Orff): Petrus
- Palestrina (Hans Pfitzner): Papst Pius V

== Discography ==
- Lebendige Vergangenheit – Paul Bender. CD, Preiser/Naxos, Wien 1999
- Aus Münchens Operngeschichte, 4 CDs, Preiser/Naxos, Wien 1999
- Sie sangen im Prinzregentheater, 3 CDs, Preiser/Naxos, Wien 2001
- Symposium Opera Coll.10 – Paul Bender, CD, Symposium/Scherzando, 2006
