= Alexia Arthurs =

American writer

- Education: University of Iowa (MFA)
- Known for: How to Love a Jamaican: Stories (2018)
- Spouse: Novuyo Tshuma (m. 2025)
- Awards: Plimpton Prize (2017)
- Website: alexiaarthurs.com

Alexia Kimberly Arthurs is a writer who grew up in both Jamaica and the United States of America. She writes about the variability of experiences of black identity of immigrants from African countries, Jamaica, and other countries of the West Indies from recent immigrants to those brought over during slavery. Her writings include short stories about community, generations, mermaids, sexuality and more. She is a recipient of the Plimpton Prize.

== Early life and education ==
Arthurs spent her first twelve years in Jamaica, at which point her family moved to Brooklyn, New York City.

Arthurs graduated from the Iowa Writers' Workshop. Arthurs returned to New York City from Iowa City when she was 24. Arthurs was undocumented, and worked as a childcare worker in New York City to pay her graduate school tuition.

== Career ==
Arthurs was awarded the 2017 Paris Review Plimpton Prize. Her first book, How To Love A Jamaican: Stories, was published in 2018 and was identified by Entertainment Weekly, BuzzFeed News, and Bitch Media as one of the best Summer reads of 2018. Her short story "Mermaid River" was included in the 2019 O. Henry Prize Stories anthology.

Arthurs has taught at the Iowa Writers' Workshop and teaches at George Mason University.

== Personal life ==
Arthurs married Zimbabwe-born writer Novuyo Tshuma in 2025.

== Works ==
- Arthurs, A. (2016). Bad Behavior. The Paris Review, (217).
- Arthurs, A. (2018). How to Love a Jamaican: Stories. Random House Publishing Group. ISBN 978-1-5247-9921-2.
