= Curfew (disambiguation) =

A curfew is an order specifying a time after which certain regulations apply.

Curfew may also refer to:

== Films ==
- Curfew (1925 film), a German silent drama film
- Curfew (1989 film), an American action/horror film directed by Gary Winick
- Curfew (1994 film), an Israeli drama film by Rashid Masharawi
- Curfew (2012 film), a short film directed by Shawn Christensen

== TV ==
- Curfew (2019 TV series), a British dystopian action drama television series starring an ensemble cast including Sean Bean, Adam Brody, and Aimee-Ffion Edwards
- Curfew (2024 TV series), a British dystopian crime drama television series starring Sarah Parish and Mandip Gill

== Music ==
- Curfew (band), an English jazz fusion band
- "Curfew" (song), a 1993 song by Drive
- "Curfew", a song by The Stranglers from Black and White
- "Curfew", a song by Spratleys Japs

== Other ==
- Curfew, the former name of Nightshift (magazine)

== See also ==
- The Curfew (disambiguation)
