= Carl de Vogt =

German actor (1885–1970)

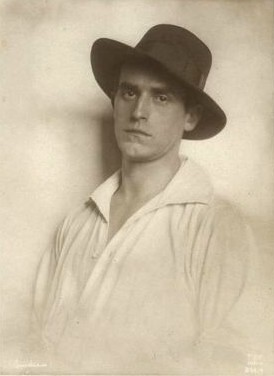
- Born: Carl Bernhard de Vogt; 14 September 1885; Cologne, Rhine Province, Kingdom of Prussia, German Empire
- Died: 16 February 1970 (aged 84); West Berlin, West Germany
- Occupation: Actor
- Years active: 1916–1964

Carl de Vogt (14 September 1885 – 16 February 1970) was a German film actor who starred in four of Fritz Lang's early films. He attended the acting school in Cologne, Germany. Together with acting he was also active as a singer and recorded several discs. His greatest hit was "Der Fremdenlegionär". An extremely successful actor in his early career, he died in relative obscurity in 1970.

In 1919 and 1920, de Vogt starred in director Fritz Lang's two-part Spiders films opposite actresses Lil Dagover and Ressel Orla. In 1932, in the early sound era, he played the Prussian hero Major Schill in the big-budget historical film The Eleven Schill Officers.

De Vogt was married to the German film actress Cläre Lotto, and the couple had a son Karl Franz de Vogt (born 14 May 1917). He was a member of the NSDAP and the Sturmabteilung.

== Selected filmography ==
Maria Carmi and Carl de Vogt in The Path of Death (1917)

- Schwert und Herd (1916) as Schmied Wilhelm Trautmann
- Friedrich Werders Sendung (1916) as Friedrich Werder
- Die Einsame (1916)
- Der Knute entflohen (1917) as Bräutigam Walter Fuchs
- When the Dead Speak (1917) as Edgar von Radowitz
- Ahasver (1917, part 1-3) as Ahasver
- Erloschene Augen. Tragödie eines blinden Kindes (1917)
- Der Herr der Welt (1918)
- The Path of Death (1918) as Graf
- Olaf Bernadotte (1918)
- Kassenrevision (1918)
- Die Beichte des Mönchs (1918)
- Der Mann im Monde (1918)
- Das Licht des Lebens (1918)
- Halbblut (1919) as Axel van der Straaten
- Der Herr der Liebe (1919) as Vasile Disecu
- The Spiders (1919-1920, part 1, 2) as Kay Hoog
- Vom Rande des Sumpfes (1919) as Ingenieur Erich Romberg
- The Woman with Orchids (1919)
- The Tragedy of a Great (1920) as Rembrandt
- On the Brink of Paradise (1920) as Kara Ben Nemsi
- The Black Tulip Festival (1920) as Adrian Witt
- Caravan of Death (1920) as Kara Ben Nemsi
- Humanity Unleashed (1920) as Winterstein, Karenows Mitarbeiter
- The Devil Worshippers (1921) as Kara Ben Nemsi
- The Thirteen of Steel (1921) as Frank Steen
- Planetenschieber (1921)
- The Oath of Stephan Huller (1921)
- The Lord of the Beasts (1921)
- Die Schreckensnacht in der Menagerie (1921)
- The Poisoned Stream (1921) as Pirat Nr. 25
- Unter Räubern und Bestien (1921)
- Aus dem Schwarzbuch eines Polizeikommissars (1921, part 2)
- Die Schatzkammer im See (1921, part 1, 2) as Harry Wills / Bill Jackson
- Acht Uhr dreizehn - Das Geheimnis des Deltaklubs (1921) as Fred Hobbing
- The Tigress (1922)
- Alone in the Jungle (1922), as Engineer Gyldendal as Ingenieur Gyldendal
- Die Kleine vom Film (1922) as Van der Heyt
- Matrosenliebste (1922)
- The White Desert (1922) as Sigurd
- The Mute of Portici (1922) as Masaniello, a Neapolitan fisherman
- Wer wirft den ersten Stein (1922) as Goot, Direktor der Tabakfabrik
- Nathan the Wise (1922) as Assad of Filneck / Young Templar
- Liebes-List und -Lust (1922) as Dioneo / Bertram / Pyrries
- Demon Circus (1923)
- Explosion (1923)
- Lachendes Weinen (1923)
- Helena (1924) as Hector
- The Game of Love (1924) as Georg, Ingenieur
- The Terror of the Sea (1924)
- The Blonde Hannele (1924) as Walter Bergson
- Prater (1924) as Martin, seaman
- The Four Last Seconds of Quidam Uhl (1924) as Quidam Uhl
- Ballettratten (1925) as König
- Die Europameisterschaft (1925) as Turnvater Jahn
- Durch Sport zum Sieg (1925) as Paul
- Bismarck (1925, part 2) as Napoleon III
- The Girl from America (1925) as Lutz Gutzewitt / Marquis Saintbrillant
- Am besten gefällt mir die Lore (1925) as Carl Funke
- The Poacher (1926) as Werner, gamekeeper
- I Once Had a Comrade (1926) as Oberleutnant Hellmuth von Khaden
- The Secret of St. Pauli (1926)
- Schützenliesel (1926) as Konrad Sturm, Forstadjunkt
- The Song of Life (1926) as Richard Marschall
- Bismarck 1862–1898 (1927) as Napoleon III
- Stolzenfels am Rhein (1927) as Wenzel von Geyr
- U-9 Weddigen (1927) as Weddingen
- Linden Lady on the Rhine (1927) as Doctor Allertag
- The Curse of Vererbung (1927) as Doctor Münchow
- The Beggar from Cologne Cathedral (1927) as The beggar
- The Merry Vineyard (1927) as Jochen Most
- Endangered Girls (1927)
- Dame Care (1928) as Baron Douglas
- Master and Mistress (1928) as Robert
- Escape (1928) as Kölling
- Number 17 (1928) as Gilbert Fordyce
- Behind Monastery Walls (1928) as Friar Meinrad
- Waterloo (1929) as Marshal Ney
- Dawn (1929) as Bernhard Eggebrecht
- Andreas Hofer (1929) as Josef Eisenstecken
- The Veil Dancer (1929)
- Disgrace (1929) as JUDr. Holan
- Three Days of Life and Death (1929) as The submarine commander
- Rag Ball (1930) as Dr. Wiegand - Rechtsanwalt
- Flachsmann the Educator (1930) as Vogelsang
- Der Fleck auf der Ehr' (1930) as Hubmayer, ein Landstreicher
- Die Frau - Die Nachtigall (1931) as Ein Offizier
- Das Geheimnis der roten Katze (1931)
- Teilnehmer antwortet nicht (1932) as Kommissär Buhlke
- The Eleven Schill Officers (1932) as Ferdinand von Schill
- The Dancer of Sanssouci (1932) as Pesne
- Trenck (1932) as Duke of Württemberg
- Song of the Black Mountains (1933) as Windolf
- A Song Goes Round the World (1933) as Theaterdirektor
- Die Nacht der großen Liebe (1933) as The Captain
- Schüsse an der Grenze (1933)
- When the Village Music Plays on Sunday Nights (1933) as Fritz Wendhofer, Gutsverwalter
- Weiße Majestät (1933) as Bundesrichter Dr. Reymond
- Liebesfrühling (1933)
- William Tell (1934) as Konrad Baumgarten
- Elisabeth und der Narr (1934)
- At the Strasbourg (1934) as Konrad Pfister, Sohn
- I for You, You for Me (1934) as Kollerbuch
- Fährmann Maria (1936) as The Minstrel
- If We All Were Angels (1936) as hotel porter
- Musketier Meier III (1938) as Unteroffizier Macke
- Rheinische Brautfahrt (1939) as Rechtsanwalt Dr. Vollbrecht
- Torreani (1951)
- Mailman Mueller (1953)
- The Seven Dresses of Katrin (1954)
- Die Ratten (1955)
- My Leopold (1955)
- Banktresor 713 (1957) as Älterer Mann
- Blind Justice (1961) as Beisitzender Richter (uncredited)
- The Secret of the Black Trunk (1962) as Patient (uncredited)
- The Invisible Dr. Mabuse (1962) as Empfangschef
- The Strangler of Blackmoor Castle (1963) as Doctor
