= The Early Deaths of Lubeck, Brennan, Harp, and Carr =

"The Early Deaths of Lubeck, Brennan, Harp, and Carr" is a short story written by American poet and novelist Jesse Ball. It was originally published in The Paris Review and won the Plimpton Prize for 2008.
