= The Curfew =

The Curfew may refer to:

- The Curfew (play), an 1807 historical tragedy by John Tobin
- The Curfew (novel), a 2011 novel by Jesse Ball
- The Curfew, a band that appears in the 2007 novel Spook Country

== See also ==
- Curfew (disambiguation)
