= Jesse Ball =

American novelist and poet (born 1978)

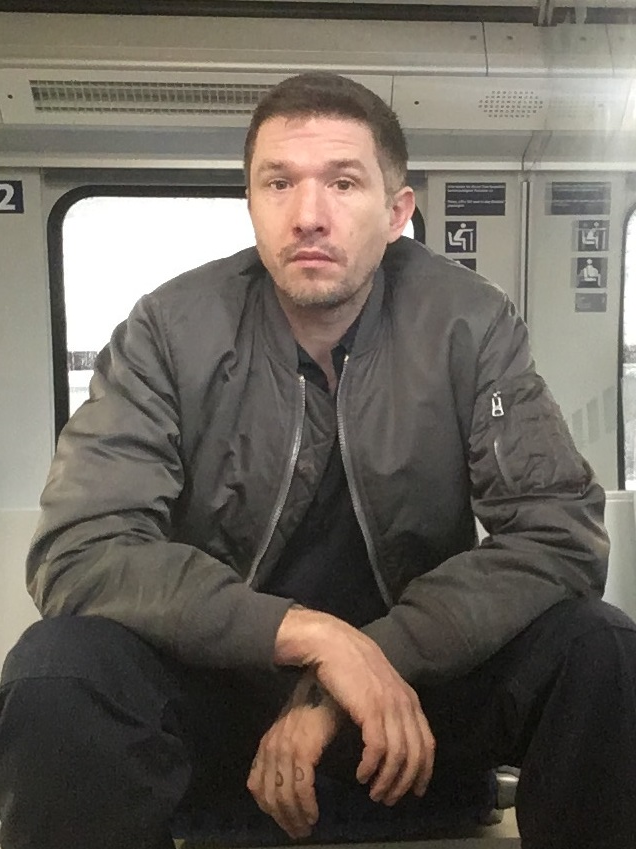
- Jesse Ball, 2019
- Born: June 7, 1978 (age 48); Port Jefferson, New York, U.S.
- Education: Vassar College; Columbia University (MFA)
- Occupations: novelist; poet
- Notable work: Silence Once Begun; A Cure for Suicide; Census
- Movement: Absurdist; Nihilist
- Spouses: Thordis Björnsdóttir (m. 2005; div. 2012) Giselle Garcia (m. 2013; div. 2016) Amalia Wiatr Lewis (m. 2024)
- Honours: Guggenheim Fellowship; Plimpton Prize; Berlin Prize

Jesse Ball (born June 7, 1978) is an American novelist and poet. He has published novels, volumes of poetry, short stories, and drawings. His works are distinguished by their spare style and have been compared to those of Jorge Luis Borges and Italo Calvino.

== Early life and education ==
Ball was born into a middle-class, English-speaking Irish-Sicilian family in Port Jefferson, New York, on Long Island. Ball's father worked in Medicaid; his mother worked in libraries. His brother, Abram, was born with Down syndrome and attended a school some distance from the place where they lived. Ball attended Port Jefferson High School and Vassar College.

After Vassar, Ball attended Columbia University, where he earned an MFA and met the poet Richard Howard, who helped Ball publish his first volume, March Book, with Grove Press.

== Career ==
In 2007 and 2008, Ball published Samedi the Deafness and the novella The Early Deaths of Lubeck, Brennan, Harp & Carr. The latter won the Paris Review's Plimpton Prize. These were followed in 2009 by The Way Through Doors, and in 2011 The Curfew, whose style The New Yorker said lay "at some oscillating coordinate between Kafka and Calvino: swift, intense fables composed of equal parts wonder and dread."

Ball's 2014 book Silence Once Begun was reviewed by James Wood in The New Yorker in February 2014. In 2015, Ball was a finalist for the NYPL Young Lion Prize (also for Silence Once Begun). Later that year, he published A Cure for Suicide, which was long-listed for the National Book Award.

In 2017, Granta included him on their list of Best Young American Novelists. On June 30 of that year Ball published an opinion piece in the Los Angeles Times suggesting that all U.S. citizens be incarcerated periodically, as a civic duty. The article likens the proposal to jury duty; no one, not even sitting politicians, judges, or military officers, would be exempt.

Ball's The Divers' Game was included on The New Yorker's Best Books of 2019 list. Staff writer Katy Waldman wrote, "This dystopic fable imagines a society riven in two, with the upper class empowered to murder members of the lower class, for any reason."

Ball is represented by Jim Rutman of Sterling Lord Literistic.

== Personal life ==
In Iceland, Ball met Thordis Björnsdóttir, a poet and author whom he collaborated with on two books, married, and divorced. Ball and the writer Catherine Lacey were partners from 2016 to 2021. Ball married Amalia Wiatr Lewis in October 2024.

Ball has lived in Chicago since 2007. For nearly 20 years, he was on the faculty at the School of the Art Institute of Chicago, where he taught courses on lying, ambiguity, dreaming, and walking. Ball was impersonated by "The Spine Collector", a manuscript thief, and wrote a letter opposing the culprit's incarceration. In 2024 he became the inaugural Sydney Blair Memorial Professor of Creative Writing and English at the University of Virginia.

== Works ==
=== Poetry ===
- March Book. Verse. (New York, NY: Grove Press, 2004)
- The Village on Horseback: Prose and Verse, 2003–2008 (Minneapolis: Milkweed Editions, 2011)

=== Novels ===
- Samedi the Deafness. Novel. (New York: Vintage, 2007)
- The Way Through Doors. Novel. (New York: Vintage, 2009)
- The Curfew. Novel. (New York: Vintage, 2011)
- Silence Once Begun. Novel. (New York: Pantheon, 2014)
- A Cure for Suicide. Novel. (New York: Pantheon, 2015)
- How to Set a Fire and Why. Novel. (New York: Pantheon, 2016)
- Census. Novel. (New York: Ecco, 2018)
- The Divers' Game. Novel. (New York: Ecco, 2019)
- The Children VI. Novel. (Buenos Aires: Editorial Sigilo 2022)
- The Repeat Room. Novel. (New York: Catapult, 2024)

=== Short fiction, collections, and novellas ===
- Vera & Linus. Stories. With Thórdís Björnsdóttir. (Reykjavík: Nyhil, 2006)
- Parables & Lies. Prose. (Lincoln, NE: The Cupboard Pamphlet, 2007). Also included in The Village on Horseback: Prose and Verse, 2003-2008.
- Pieter Emily. Novella serialized in Guernica (2009). Also included in The Village on Horseback: Prose and Verse, 2003-2008.
- The Lesson. Novella. (New York: Vintage, 2016)
- Deaths of Henry King. Stories. With Brian Evenson, Lilli Carré. (New York: Uncivilized, 2017)
- The History of the Dolls and What They Did. Prose. (London: Hanuman, 2025)

=== Nonfiction ===
- Notes on My Dunce Cap. Nonfiction. (Brooklyn: Pioneer Works Press, 2016)
- Sleep, Death's Brother. Nonfiction. (Brooklyn: Pioneer Works Press, 2017)

=== Memoir ===
- Autoportrait. Memoir. (Catapult, 2022)

=== Drawings ===
- Og svo kom nóttin, Drawings. With Thórdís Björnsdóttir. (Reykjavík: Nyhil, 2006)

== Awards and honors ==
=== Honors ===
- Creative Capital Award, 2016
- Guggenheim Fellowship, 2016
- Granta Best of Young American Novelists, 2017
- Berlin Prize, American Academy in Berlin, 2018, for the novel The Children Six
- The Illinois Author of the Year for 2015: Illinois Association of Teachers of English
- National Endowment for the Arts Creative Writing Fellowship, 2014

=== Literary awards ===
- Longlisted for the 2015 National Book Award for Fiction, A Cure for Suicide
- The Plimpton Prize for the story The Early Deaths of Lubeck, Brennan, Harp, and Carr, 2008
- 2018 Gordon Burn Prize for Census
