= The Colonel (1918 film) =

1918 Hungarian film

- Directed by: Michael Curtiz
- Written by: Richárd Falk (screenplay); Ferenc Herczeg (original play)
- Produced by: Phoenix Film
- Starring: Cläre Lotto; Bela Lugosi; Sandor Goth
- Cinematography: Istvan Eiben
- Distributed by: Phonix Film
- Release date: 30 December 1918
- Country: Hungary
- Language: Silent

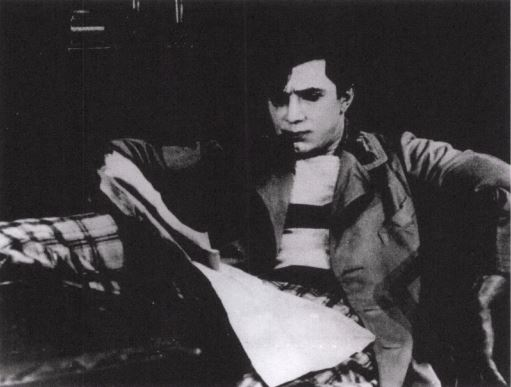
Az ezredes

The Colonel (Hungarian: Az Ezredes) is a 1918 Hungarian film directed by Michael Curtiz. It featured Bela Lugosi in his last Hungarian film, just before he immigrated to Germany.

The script by Richard Falk is based on the play by Ferenc Herczeg. The film was first released on 30 December 1918 at the Omnia Theater in Budapest.

== Plot ==
The Colonel (a professional thief) is caught burgling a millionaire's home. Rather than be arrested, the Colonel agrees to perform a service for the millionaire in exchange for his freedom. He is told that he must perform another robbery, this time stealing something from the millionaire's brother. Meanwhile, the Colonel falls in love with the rich man's daughter.

== Cast ==
- Bela Lugosi as The Colonel (a thief)
- László Z. Molnár
- Charles Puffy (credited as Karoly Huszar)
- Sándor Góth
- Géza Boross
- Janka Csatay
- Cläre Lotto
- Zoltán Szerémy as Houston
- Árpád id. Latabár
- Gerő Mály
