= Emma Cline =

American writer (born 1989)

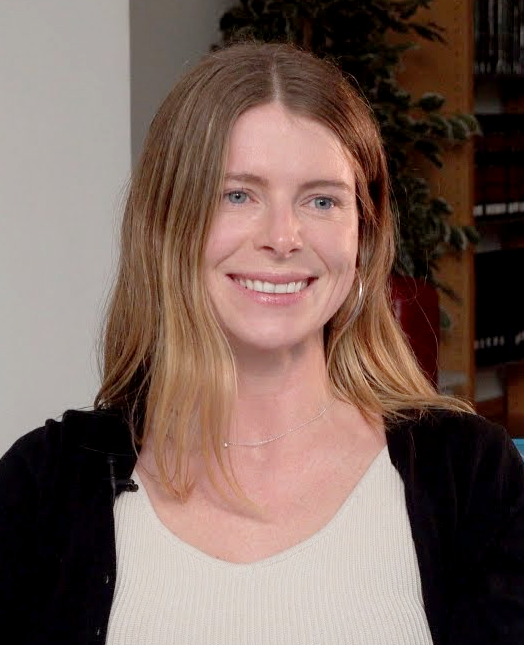
- Cline in 2022
- Born: 1989 (age 36–37); Sonoma County, California, U.S.
- Education: Middlebury College; Columbia University (MFA)
- Occupations: Author, writer
- Writing career
- Notable work: The Girls
- Notable awards: 2014 Plimpton Prize

Emma Cline is an American writer and novelist from California.

She published her first novel, The Girls, in 2016, to positive reviews. The book was shortlisted for the John Leonard Prize from the National Book Critics Circle and the Center for Fiction First Novel Prize. Her story collection, Daddy, was published in 2020, and her second novel, The Guest, was published in 2023.

Her stories have been published in The New Yorker, Tin House, Granta, and The Paris Review. In 2017, Cline was named one of Granta's Best of Young American Novelists, and Forbes named her one of their "30 Under 30 in Media". She is a recipient of the Plimpton Prize and was awarded a Guggenheim Fellowship.

== Life and career ==
=== Personal life ===
Cline, born in 1989, was raised in Sonoma County, California. She was the second of seven children in her family. After graduating from Sonoma Academy, at age 16, Cline attended Middlebury College, where she studied art. During her first year there, she won a writing award for her short story, "What is Lost". After graduating, Cline attended Columbia University, where she received her MFA in 2013. While at Columbia, she wrote "Marion", a short piece of fiction, which was published by The Paris Review in their Summer 2013 issue. A year later, The Paris Review awarded Cline the Plimpton Prize for the story. Since then, her writing has been published in multiple journals.

=== The Girls ===
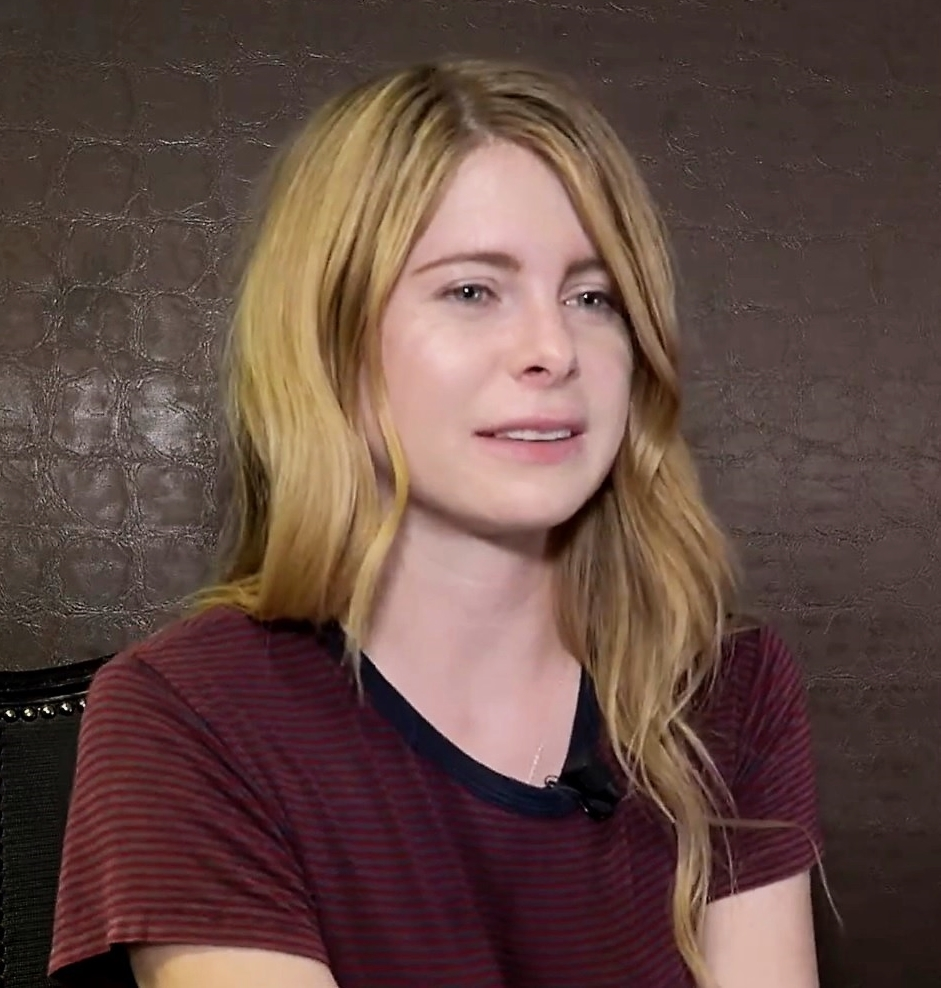
Cline speaks about The Girls in 2016

Cline's first novel, The Girls, was published in 2016 by Random House Publishing. She was offered a $2 million advance by Random House, who outbid 11 other publishers for the novel. American film producer Scott Rudin bought the film rights to the book, shortly before it was acquired by Random House. The novel is based, in part, on the Charles Manson cult and murders of the late 1960s. The story is told from the view point of Evie Boyd, a fourteen-year-old girl, whose childhood is changed when she is introduced to a cult. As an adult, Evie reflects on her actions, as a child, bringing up questions of what it means to grow up as a girl and how injustice, in the world, can lead to terrible violence. While Cline is celebrated for her descriptive abilities and attention to gender structures, critics have also said that the cult setting seemed unnecessary to the novel and left the ending feeling unfulfilled. Still, the book was well received by the general public, and The Girls spent three months on The New York Times Best Seller list. It won the 2016 Shirley Jackson Award for Best Novel. The movie production for the novel is in the development stages.

=== Daddy ===
Cline's short story collection, Daddy, was published in 2020 by Random House Publishing. The New York Times called Cline "an astonishingly gifted stylist."

=== The Guest ===
In May 2023, an exclusive excerpt from Cline's second novel The Guest appeared in Vogue. The book was published by Random House on May 16, 2023. The New York Times wrote that the novel "could be read as an entertaining series of misguided shenanigans interrupting the upper class’s summer vacation, but under Cline’s command, every sentence as sharp as a scalpel, a woman toeing the line between welcome and unwelcome guest becomes a fully destabilizing force". She has said that part of it was inspired by John Cheever's short story "The Swimmer." The Guest was a national bestseller and was longlisted for the PEN/Faulkner Award. A24 and Square Peg, with Sadie Sink and Lorene Scafaria, negotiated the movie rights.

=== Switzy ===
Cline published Switzy in September 2026, through Chatto & Windus. Well received by critics, it made the longlist for the 2026 Booker Prize.

=== Other endeavors ===
Cline is the co-founder, along with Peter Mendelsund, of Picture Books, an imprint of Gagosian Gallery. They have published work by Ottessa Moshfegh, Joy Williams, Percival Everett, Lydia Millet and Sam Lipsyte.

In February 2017, Cline's former boyfriend Chaz Reetz-Laiolo made plagiarism accusations against Cline that were ultimately dismissed by a judge. Reetz-Laiolo said Cline installed a spyware program on his computer in order to read his personal work and emails without his consent. He demanded reparations and threatened to put forth a public court filing that included sexually explicit images and text messages of Emma Cline. Cline put forth a countersuit, arguing that the spyware was for her own protection because Reetz-Laiolo had been physically and emotionally abusive, and that the similarities between Reetz-Laito's work and The Girls were minimal. Random House issued a statement in support of Cline. In June 2018, the copyright claim was dismissed with prejudice by Judge William Orrick, who said, "Both stories are ‘coming of age’ tales of sorts. But they vary significantly in detail, breadth and texture" and called the behavior of Reetz-Laiolo's lawyers "remarkably offensive."

== Awards ==
=== Literary prizes ===
| Year | Title | Award | Category | Result | Ref. |
|---|---|---|---|---|---|
| 2014 | "Marion" | Plimpton Prize | — | Won | |
| 2016 | The Girls | Center for Fiction First Novel Prize | — | Shortlisted | |
| 2016 | The Girls | Los Angeles Times Book Prize | Mystery & Thriller | Finalist | |
| 2016 | The Girls | National Book Critics Circle Award | First Book | Finalist | |
| 2016 | The Girls | Shirley Jackson Award | Novel | Won | |
| 2021 | "White Noise" | O. Henry Award | — | Won | |
| 2024 | The Guest | PEN/Faulkner Award for Fiction | — | Longlisted | |
| 2026 | Switzy | The Booker Prize | — | Longlisted | |

=== Honors ===
- 2017 Granta Best of Young American Novelists
- 2024 Guggenheim Fellowship

== Bibliography ==
=== Books ===
- The Girls. Random House. 2016. ISBN 978-0-8129-9860-3.
- Daddy: Stories. Random House. 2020. ISBN 978-0-8129-9864-1.
- The Guest. Random House. 2023. ISBN 978-0-8129-9862-7.
- Switzy. Random House. 2026. ISBN 9-780-5935-9524-4.

=== Short fiction ===
- "Perseids". Tin House. Vol. 7, no. 4. Summer 2006.
- "Marion". The Paris Review. No. 205. Summer 2013.
- "Arcadia". Granta. July 13, 2016.
- "Northeast Regional". The New Yorker. April 3, 2017.
- "Los Angeles". Granta. April 25, 2017.
- "What Can You Do with a General". The New Yorker. January 28, 2019.
- "Son of Friedman". The New Yorker. June 24, 2019.
- "The Nanny". The Paris Review. No. 231. Winter 2019.
- "White Noise". The New Yorker. June 1, 2020.
- "The Iceman". The New Yorker. August 16, 2021.
- "Certain European Movies". The New Yorker. August 25, 2022.

=== Essays ===
- "See Me". The Paris Review. March 17, 2014.
- "The Corrupted American Innocence of Archie Comics". The New Yorker. July 7, 2016.
- "Fleeing the Fires in Sonoma County". The New Yorker. October 13, 2017.
- "The Drive Home". The New York Times. November 14, 2017.
- "Haunted House". The New Yorker. July 5, 2021.
- "The Erl-King". Granta. No. 161. November 17, 2022.

=== Anthology ===
- The Best American Short Stories 2017
- The Best American Short Stories 2018
- The Best American Short Stories 2020
- The Unprofessionals: New American Writing from The Paris Review

== See also ==
- List of Guggenheim Fellowships awarded in 2024
