= Wells Tower =

American writer of short stories and non-fiction

- Born: April 14, 1973 (age 53); Vancouver, British Columbia, Canada
- Education: Wesleyan University (BA), Columbia University (MFA)
- Occupation: Writer
- Writing career
- Notable works: Everything Ravaged, Everything Burned
- Notable awards: The Paris Review Plimpton (Discovery) Prize, two Pushcart Prizes

Wells Tower (born April 14, 1973) is an American writer of short stories, non-fiction, feature films and television. In 2009 he published his first short story collection, Everything Ravaged, Everything Burned (Farrar, Straus and Giroux) to much critical acclaim. His short fiction has also been published in The New Yorker, The Paris Review, McSweeney's, Vice, Harper's Magazine, A Public Space, Fence and other periodicals. In 2022, he wrote the screenplay for the feature film Pain Hustlers, starring Emily Blunt and directed by David Yates.

== Early life, education, and early career ==
Tower was born in Vancouver, British Columbia, but grew up in North Carolina. He played guitar in the punk band Hellbender for six years beginning his senior year of high school.

He received a B.A. in anthropology and sociology from Wesleyan University and an M.F.A. in fiction writing from Columbia University's School of the Arts. After graduating from Wesleyan, he traveled around the United States doing odd jobs. He began his professional career when he convinced an editor at The Washington Post Magazine to publish an article about a carnival worker.

Tower is the recipient of two Pushcart Prizes, the 2002 Plimpton (Discovery) Prize from The Paris Review, and a Henfield Foundation Award.

== Writing career ==
Farrar, Straus and Giroux published Tower's first short story collection, Everything Ravaged, Everything Burned in 2009. The book was reviewed in the New York Times Book Review by Edmund White and in the New York Times by Michiko Kakutani. Kakutani picked it as one of her ten best books of 2009. It was also a finalist for The Story Prize. The short story from which the collection's title is taken is about a community of Vikings growing older.

In June 2010, Tower was named as one of The New Yorker magazine's "20 under 40" luminary fiction writers. On June 10, 2010, he was presented with the Tenth Annual New York Public Library's Young Lions Fiction Award, a $10,000 prize for an American writer under 40.

His work was selected for The Best American Short Stories 2010. Since 2010, his nonfiction reporting has been featured in The Best American Sports Writing three times, for "Own Goal" (2011), originally published in Harper's Magazine and a finalist for a National Magazine Award for Profile Writing; "Welcome to the Far East Conference" (2012), originally published in GQ; and "Who Wants to Shoot an Elephant?" (2015), also originally published in GQ.

In 2014, Tower was a finalist for two National Magazine Awards in Essays and Criticism for "The Old Man at Burning Man" and in Fiction for "The Dance Contest."

On May 22, 2022, Netflix paid $50 million for global rights to the conspiracy film Pain Hustlers, written by Tower, directed by David Yates, and starring Emily Blunt. Tower's original screenplay was inspired by Evan Hughes’ nonfiction book The Hard Sell, which was published January 2022.On the review aggregator website Rotten Tomatoes, 23% of 115 critics' reviews are positive, with an average rating of 4.8/10. The website's consensus reads: "Pain Hustlers has some great actors and a worthwhile premise, but lackluster execution dooms this dramatic look at the opioid epidemic." Metacritic, which uses a weighted average, assigned the film a score of 44 out of 100, based on 34 critics, indicating "mixed or average" reviews.

Tower’s unproduced screenwriting credits include The True American for director Kathryn Bigelow and Megan Ellison's Annapurna Pictures, and Framed for George Clooney's Smokehouse Productions and Netflix. His unproduced television writing credits include the dramatic series Paper for Brad Pitt's Plan B Entertainment and HBO, and the series Mayor for Alec Baldwin and HBO.

== Personal life ==
As of 2009, Tower divides his time between Chapel Hill, North Carolina, and Brooklyn, New York.

== Bibliography ==
- "Who Wants to Shoot an Elephant?", GQ, October 2, 2017
- "No Amount of Traffic or Instagrammers or Drunks Can Take the Magic Out of (Semi-) Wilderness", Outside, June 7, 2016
- "The Old Man at Burning Man", GQ, August 31, 2015
- "The Great Paper Caper", GQ, November 1, 2014
- "From Wells Tower’s ‘The Dance Contest'", McSweeney's, Issue 44
- "The Elvis Impersonator, the Karate Instructor, a Fridge Full of Severed Heads, and the Plot 2 Kill the President", GQ, September 29, 2013
- "In Gold We Trust", GQ, January 6, 2012
- "Welcome to the Far East Conference", GQ, April 17, 2011
- "Moto", ESPN, March 2, 2011
- "Own Goal", Harper's Magazine, June 2010
- Everything Ravaged, Everything Burned: Stories, Farrar, Straus & Giroux, 2009
- "The Thing with Feathers", Outside, March 1, 2006
- "The Brown Coast," The Paris Review, Spring 2002 (No. 161)
- "Retreat," McSweeney's, Issue 30 (March 2009)
- "Executors of Important Energies", McSweeney's, Issue 14 (September 2004)
- "Down Through The Valley ", The Paris Review, September 2001 (No. 159)
- "Leopard", The New Yorker, November 10, 2008
- "Door In Your Eye", A Public Space, Winter 2008 (Issue 05)
- "Wild America", Vice, December 2, 2000
- "On the Show", Harper's Magazine, May 2007
- "Everything Ravaged, Everything Burned", Fence, Fall/Winter 2002 (Vol. 4, No. 2)
