= Census (novel) =

2018 novel by Jesse Ball

- Author: Jesse Ball
- Language: English
- Published: March 6, 2018
- Publisher: Granta Books
- Publication place: United States
- Pages: 272
- Awards: 2018 Gordon Burn Prize
- ISBN: 978-0-062-67613-9

Census is a 2018 American novel by Jesse Ball.

== Background ==
After his brother with Down syndrome died, Bell wrote a novel about an ill widow working on a census, travelling with her son—who is implied to have Down syndrome, though not explicitly stated.

== Reception ==
Census received positive reviews from critics. James Lasdun of The Guardian wrote "the element of lived experience enters the story most poignantly. Vignettes that crystallise the boy's touching (often very funny) way of looking at things crop up as scenes or memories throughout the book, adding the tang of observed reality to its more speculative qualities", as well as drawing similarities to the works of Franz Kafka. Drew Nellins Smith of The Washington Post wrote "[t]hough Census reads, at times, like a protracted parable, it eschews tidy lessons". Parul Sehgal of The New York Times wrote "I can think of no higher praise for this novel than to echo what this woman tells the father for traveling with his son, for letting the world experience his gift". Kit Caless of New Statesman wrote "Ball is convincing enough for me to let that go as I read his work. His writing is unique and judicious. Matching this with his personal experience of loving someone with Down's has produced a wonderful, stirring, essential novel". Patrick Langley of The White Review wrote "Census progresses with such a meditative languor that it feels, at times, like being lulled into a dream. Contrastingly, it can offer moments of almost unbearable intensity. It might be a 'hollow' book, but it is overflowing with feeling".

== Awards ==
Census won the 2018 Gordon Burn Prize.
