= The Four Last Seconds of Quidam Uhl =

1924 film directed by Robert Reinert

- Directed by: Robert Reinert
- Written by: Robert Reinert
- Starring: Carl de Vogt; Helena Makowska; John Mylong
- Production company: Monumental-Film
- Release date: 30 December 1924
- Country: Germany
- Languages: Silent; German intertitles

The Four Last Seconds of Quidam Uhl (German: Die vier letzten Sekunden des Quidam Uhl) is a 1924 German silent drama film directed by Robert Reinert and starring Carl de Vogt, Helena Makowska and John Mylong. The film was not a success on its release.

== Cast ==
- Carl de Vogt as Quidam Uhl
- Helena Makowska as Evelyne
- John Mylong as Heinrich, Magdalensa Bruder
- Karl Falkenberg as Man crushed by Boats
- Claire Kronburger as Magdalena, Quidams Verlobte

== Bibliography ==
- David Bordwell. Poetics of cinema. Routledge, 2008.
