= Cläre Lotto =

German actress (1893–1952)

- Born: 23 September 1893; Kasekow, Province of Pomerania, Kingdom of Prussia, German Empire (now Casekow, Brandenburg, Germany)
- Died: 23 August 1952 (aged 58); Tempelhof, West Berlin, West Germany (now Berlin, Germany)
- Other names: Claire Lotto; Kläry Lotto
- Occupation: Actress
- Years active: 1916–1933

Cläre Lotto (23 September 1893 – 23 August 1952) was a German film actress of the silent era. She appeared in 41 films between 1916 and 1933. She married German film actor Carl de Vogt, with whom she had a son with, Karl Franz de Vogt (born 14 May 1917).

== Selected filmography ==
- Az Ezredes (1917)
- Lili (1918)
- A 99-es számú bérkocsi (1918)
- A Napraforgós hölgy (1918)
- Auf den Trümmern des Paradieses (1920)
- Die Todeskarawane (1920)
- The Lord of the Beasts (1921)
- In Thrall to the Claw (1921)
- The Thirteen of Steel (1921)
- The White Desert (1922)
- Alone in the Jungle (1922)
- The Homecoming of Odysseus (1922)
- Demon Circus (1923)
- The Terror of the Sea (1924)
- Slaves of Love (1924)
- Prater (1924)
- Ballettratten (1925)
- The Girl from America (1925)
- Flight Around the World (1925)
- Curfew (1925)
- Hell of Love (1926)
- Distorting at the Resort (1932)
