= Anna von Palen =

German actress

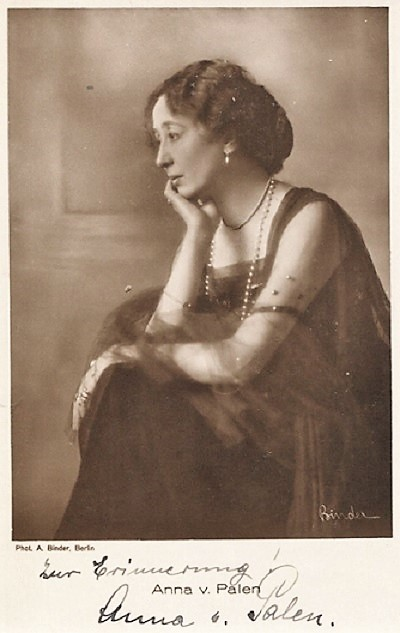
- Signed photo of Anna von Palen
- Born: 26 May 1875; Perleberg, Germany
- Died: 27 January 1939 (aged 63); Berlin, Germany
- Other name: Anna von Pahlen
- Occupation: Actress
- Years active: 1915-1938

Anna von Palen (26 May 1875 – 27 January 1939) was a German film actress of the silent era. She appeared in 74 films between 1915 and 1938. She was born in Perleberg, Germany and died in Berlin, Germany.

== Selected filmography ==
- When the Heart Burns with Hate (1917)
- The Enchanted Princess (1919)
- Die Todeskarawane (1920)
- Mascotte (1920)
- The Hustler (1920)
- The Woman Without a Soul (1920)
- Auf den Trümmern des Paradieses (1920)
- Der Bucklige und die Tänzerin (1920)
- The Lord of the Beasts (1921)
- The Railway King (1921)
- Shame (1922)
- The Sensational Trial (1923)
- Black Earth (1923)
- Set Me Free (1924)
- The Doll of Luna Park (1925)
- The Salesgirl from the Fashion Store (1925)
- The Pink Slippers (1927)
- The Bordello in Rio (1927)
- The Lorelei (1927)
- Under the Lantern (1928)
- Anastasia, the False Czar's Daughter (1928)
- Scandal in Baden-Baden (1929)
- At the Strasbourg (1934)
- Blood Brothers (1935)
- Fanny Elssler (1937)
