= The Thirteen of Steel =

1921 film directed by Johannes Guter

- Directed by: Johannes Guter
- Written by: Wolfgang Geiger; Johannes Guter
- Produced by: Erich Pommer
- Starring: Carl de Vogt; Georg H. Schnell; Claire Lotto
- Cinematography: A.O. Weitzenberg
- Production company: Decla-Bioscop
- Distributed by: Decla-Bioscop
- Release date: 14 January 1921
- Running time: 94 minutes
- Country: Germany
- Languages: Silent; German intertitles

The Thirteen of Steel (German: Die Dreizehn aus Stahl) is a 1921 German silent crime film directed by Johannes Guter and starring Carl de Vogt, Georg H. Schnell and Claire Lotto. It was produced by Erich Pommer for Decla-Bioscop before the company merged with UFA. It was shot at the Babelsberg Studios in Berlin. The film's sets were designed by the art director Franz Seemann.

== Cast ==
- Carl de Vogt as Frank Steen
- Georg H. Schnell as Robert Chester
- Claire Lotto as Mary Reading
- Rudolf Hofbauer as Davis
- Joseph Klein as Ship's Captain
- Nien Soen Ling as Wirt zum "Tanzenden Chinesen"
- Auguste Prasch-Grevenberg as Pensionsvorsteherin
- Camillo Triembacher as Beverley
- Lo Wedekind as Sidd
- Lore Busch as Wirtin zur "Weißen Maus"
- Paul Hallström as Wirt zur "Schwarzen Ratte"

== Bibliography ==
- Giesen, Rolf . The Nosferatu Story: The Seminal Horror Film, Its Predecessors and Its Enduring Legacy. McFarland, 2019.
- Hardt, Ursula. From Caligari to California: Erich Pommer's life in the International Film Wars. Berghahn Books, 1996.
- Jacobsen, Wolfgang. Babelsberg: das Filmstudio. Argon, 1994.
