= When the Dead Speak =

1917 film by Robert Reinert

- German release poster
- German: Wenn Tote sprechen
- Directed by: Robert Reinert
- Written by: Robert Reinert
- Produced by: Hanns Lippmann
- Starring: Maria Carmi; Carl de Vogt; Conrad Veidt
- Cinematography: Helmar Lerski
- Production company: Deutsche Bioscop
- Distributed by: Deutsche Bioscop
- Release date: 27 July 1917
- Running time: 72 minutes
- Country: Germany
- Languages: Silent; German intertitles

When the Dead Speak (German: Wenn Tote sprechen) is a 1917 German silent drama film directed by Robert Reinert and starring Maria Carmi, Carl de Vogt and Conrad Veidt.

The film's sets were designed by the art directors Robert A. Dietrich and Artur Günther. It was shot at the Babelsberg Studios in Berlin. It is a lost film.

== Cast ==
- Maria Carmi as Maria von Brion / Leonore von Radowitz
- Carl de Vogt as Edgar von Radowitz
- Conrad Veidt as Richard von Worth

== Bibliography ==
- John T. Soister. Conrad Veidt on Screen: A Comprehensive Illustrated Filmography. McFarland, 2002.
