= Adamah (film) =

Film directed by Helmar Lerski

Adama
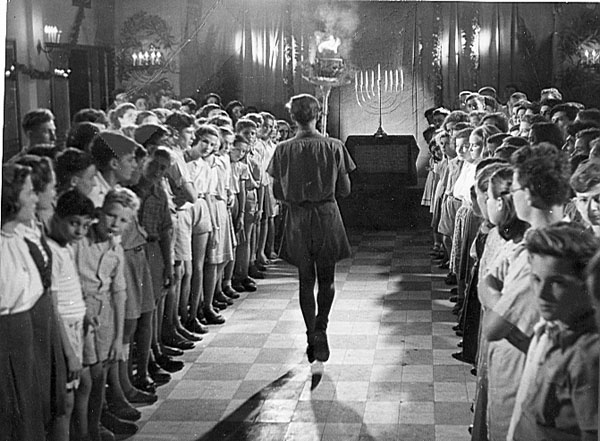
- Film still
- Directed by: Helmar Lerski
- Release date: 1948
- Country: Mandatory Palestine

Adama (English: Tomorrow's a Wonderful Day) is a film produced in Mandatory Palestine shortly before the establishment of Israel. It was directed by Helmar Lerski and filmed during 1947–1948. The plot of the film focuses on the life of a Jewish boy, who was a Holocaust survivor, trying to rehabilitate himself from the traumas he experienced by working on the land and establishing social relationships while living in the youth village Ben Shemen. The initiator of the film was Dr. Siegfried Lehman the founder of Ben Shemen. He was motivated by a desire to show the world the educational system used in the village and he also had hopes of using the film as a tool for fundraising. The actors in the film were actual pupils in the village and the educational staff also participated in the production.

== Plot ==
Benjamin, an adolescent Holocaust survivor, arrives on a bus with other boys who are new arrivals at the village. They are introduced to the class. He is still suffering from trauma and begins to hoard bread taken from storage even though the village has no lack of food. He watches other children at work but feels foreign and alienated. By chance he encounters a barbed wire that fences in a herd of cows. The sight of the barbed wire flashes him back to the Nazi concentration camp. He attacks the fence, destroys it and allows the cows to go free. They damage the vegetable garden. The incident teaches Benjamin that he has much to learn about the values of his new environment. The teachers decide to help in his integration and give him the honored role as torch bearer in the village Hanukah ceremony. The torch is lit at the graves of the Maccabees and carried to the dining hall of the village where it lights the holiday menorah. This has a profound influence on Benjamin and two years later he is the leader of a group graduating from the village to establish a new settlement. His ties to the land of his forefathers reaches fulfillment by working strenuously in preparing the rocky soil for planting.

== Production ==
Dr. Lehman, the director of the youth village, conceived of the idea of making a film to represent the village when he first came to Mandatory Palestine. As early as 1926, Yaakov Ben Dov produced a short film on the first days of Ben Shemen. The success of that film was a main factor in providing incentive for the production of a full blown movie during the 1930s. Practically the film began production only after World War II. Lehman believed that assistance given to needy children in Mandatory Palestine would lead the way to the integration of refugee children who were arriving from Europe with the assistance of Youth Aliyah. An agreement was signed between Ben Shemen and the woman’s Zionist organization in the U.S.A, Hadassah (the official representative of Youth Aliyah in the U.S.). According to this agreement Hadassah would cover the deficits in the budget of Ben Shemen and assist in funding the film about life in the village. In return Hadassah would have exclusive rights in the film in the U.S.A. The intention was to produce a full blown film with a plot that would move audiences and present the educational achievements of the youth village.

It is difficult to define the filming of the motion picture as standard or exceptional because, at that time, there was really no film industry standard to compare with. The film was shot totally at its authentic location without use of a film studio, which was a substantial innovation for its time. The idea of using the children of Ben Shemen to play themselves was an original idea. The main acting role in the film was played by Benjamin Hildesheim whose personal story was very similar to that of the role he played. The exception was that Hildesheim had a problem free integration after the war. The authenticity that Lehman and Lersky were hoping for was achieved in the film. The assistant director of the film was Joseph Salzberger and the photographers Sasha Alexander, Robert Ziller, and Naftalie Rubinstein – all noted talents in their field.

The young Richard Levinson, one of the pupils of the village, assisted by photographing different sites in the village prior to production thus providing opportunity for the professionals to get a detailed understanding of the location. Other assistance came from other well-known experts in the field: Zalman Louvish, Otto Sonenfeld, and Azaria Rapoport.

== Reception ==
In a review for Variety on April 13, 1949 Wear considered the film to be " ... an intelligent, if slow moving, documentary of Childrens Village in Israel" and stated "Tomorrow's a Wonderful Day" hardly measures up to modern documentary standards."
