= At the Strasbourg =

1934 film

- Directed by: Franz Osten
- Written by: Max Ferner; Walter Pieper
- Starring: Hans Stüwe; Ursula Grabley; Anna von Palen
- Cinematography: Willy Winterstein
- Edited by: Martha Dübber
- Music by: Clemens Schmalstich
- Production company: Ideal-Film
- Distributed by: Märkische Film
- Release date: 13 April 1934
- Country: Germany
- Language: German

At the Strasbourg (German: Zu Straßburg auf der Schanz) is a 1934 German comedy film directed by Franz Osten and starring Hans Stüwe, Ursula Grabley, and Anna von Palen.

The film's sets were designed by the art directors Kurt Dürnhöfer and Max Knaake. Location filming took place in Strasbourg and Switzerland.

== Cast ==
- Hans Stüwe as Ruedi Pfister, Sohn
- Ursula Grabley as Beate Rusti, Tochter
- Anna von Palen as Ida Pfister, Gutsherrin
- Carl de Vogt as Konrad Pfister, Sohn
- Eduard von Winterstein as Jacob Rusti
- Margarete Kupfer as Berta, seine Frau
- Harry Hardt as Renan Ruegg, Sohn
- Heinrich Schroth as Der Kommandant
- Gustl Gstettenbaur as Joggeli
- Otto Sauter-Sarto as Peter Ruegg, Amtmann
- Leo Peukert as Reisener Jakob
- Wolfgang von Schwindt as Ein Werber
- Ernst Rückert as Ein Offizier

== Bibliography ==
- Bock, Hans-Michael; Bergfelder, Tim, eds. (2009). The Concise Cinegraph: Encyclopaedia of German Cinema. New York: Berghahn Books. ISBN 978-1-57181-655-9.
