= Der Mond =

1939 opera by Carl Orff

- Opera by Carl Orff
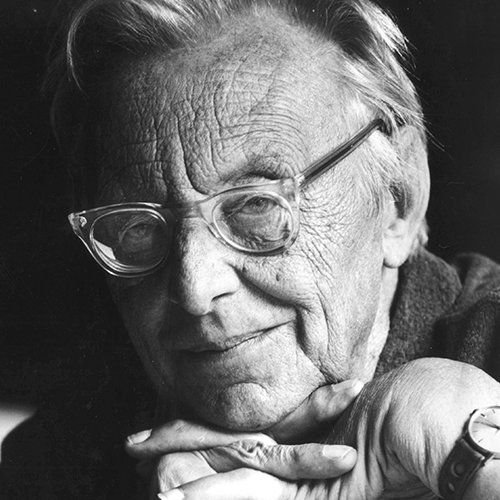
- Orff, c. 1970
- Description: Ein kleines Welttheater ("A little world theatre")
- Librettist: Carl Orff
- Language: German
- Based on: a Grimms' fairy tale
- Premiere: 5 February 1939; Bavarian State Opera

Der Mond (The Moon) is an opera in one act by Carl Orff based on a Grimm's fairy tale with a libretto by the composer. It was first performed on 5 February 1939 by the Bavarian State Opera in Munich under the direction of Clemens Krauss. The composer describes it not as an opera but as Ein kleines Welttheater ("A little world theatre"); the performance lasts for about one hour and is often paired with Orff's Die Kluge.

== Roles ==
Roles, voice types, premiere cast
| Role | Voice type | Première cast, 5 February 1939 Conductor: Clemens Krauss |
|---|---|---|
| The storyteller | tenor | Julius Patzak |
| Saint Peter | bass | Paul Bender |
| A farmer | baritone | |
| First Rascal | baritone | Franz Theo Reuter |
| Second Rascal | baritone | Emil Graf |
| Third Rascal | tenor | Karl Ostertag |
| Fourth Rascal | bass | Georg Wieter |
| Landlord | spoken | Ambros Witt |

== Synopsis ==
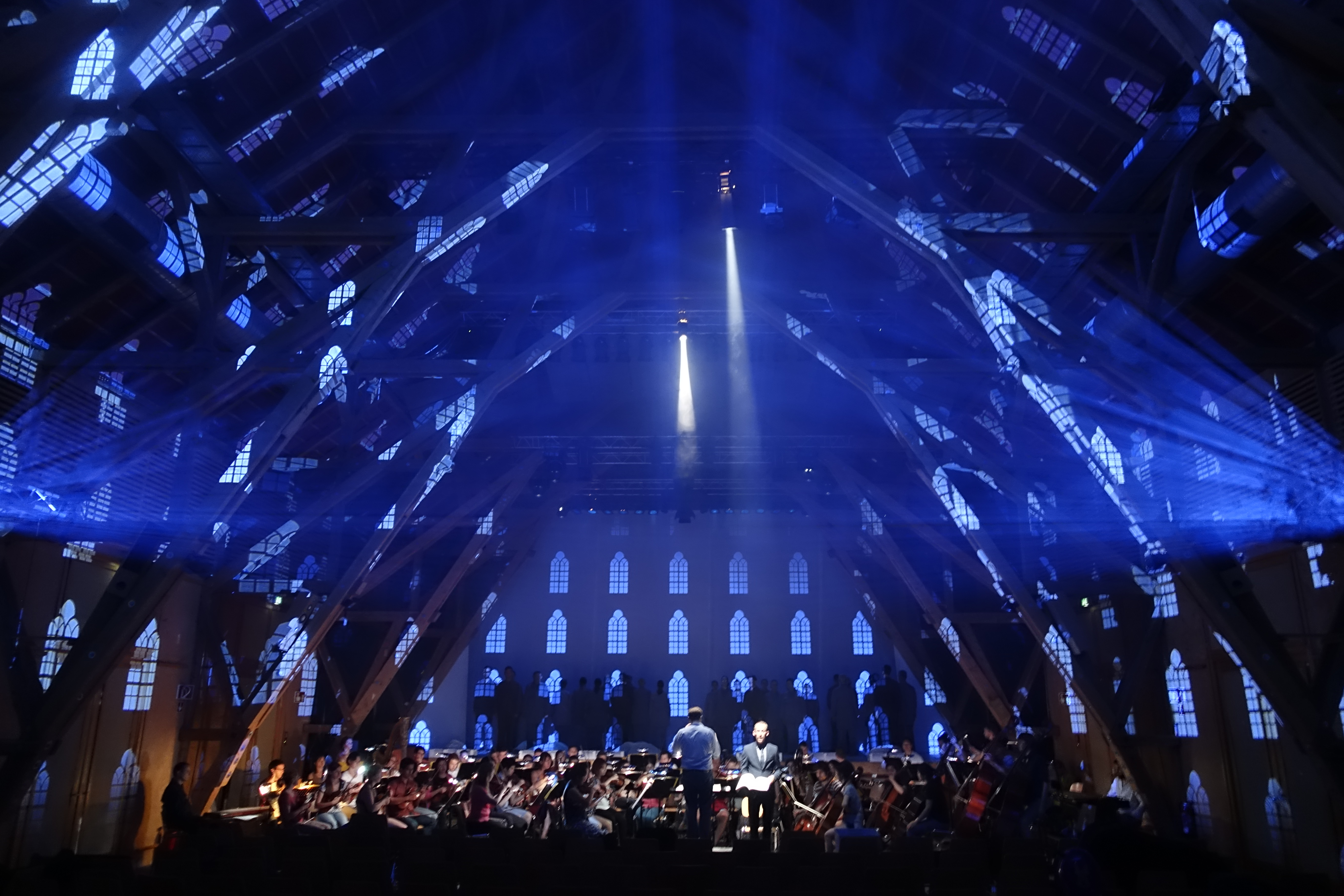
Video Design at the Carl-Orff Festival 2015

The story involves characters who steal the Moon for their country which does not have a Moon. They take the Moon to their graves upon their deaths and St. Peter goes to the underworld to retrieve it and hang it again in the sky. Two speaking roles include that of a child and a landlord. Singing roles include the four rascals who steal the Moon, St. Peter, a farmer and the narrator.

== Instrumentation ==
- Woodwind: 3 flutes (2 doubling piccolos), 3 oboes (1 doubling English horn), 3 clarinets (1 doubling bass clarinet), 2 bassoons (1 doubling double bassoon)
- Brass: 4 French horn, 3 trumpets, 3 trombones, tuba
- Percussion (5 percussionists): bass drum, snare drum, field drum, tambourine, triangle, xylophone, cymbals, castanets, various Turkish cymbals, big tamtam, ratchet, stick, sleigh bells, hour bell, tubular bells, glass harmonica, metallophone, glockenspiel
- Other instruments: harp, celesta, piano, harmonium, accordion, zither, strings
- Stage orchestra: mixed choir, natural horn (tuba), organ, bells, 3 field drums, bass drum, cymbals, tam-tam, wind machine, thunder machine, thunder & lighting (Blitz, Einschlag)

== Selected recordings ==
- Die Kluge, Der Mond, conductor: Kurt Eichhorn, 1970, RCA Classic, ASIN B000025QHU
- Die Kluge, Der Mond, Elisabeth Schwarzkopf, Gottlob Frick, Marcel Cordes, Benno Kusche, Hermann Prey, Gustav Neidlinger, Hans Hotter, Karl Schmitt-Walter, conductor: Wolfgang Sawallisch, 1990, EMI Classics 0777763712 2 1
