= March Book =

American poet Jesse Ball's first book

- Author: Jesse Ball
- Language: English
- Published: 2004 (Grove Books)
- Publication place: United States
- Pages: 103 Pages
- ISBN: 978-0-8021-4122-4

March Book is the debut book of poetry by American writer Jesse Ball. The book was published in April 2004 by Grove Press.

== Critical reception ==
DeSales Harrison in Boston Review wrote "what remains to be established in Ball’s work is a sense of what responsibilities his luminous, arresting, uncanny dreamscapes call the reader toward".

The Irish poet Eamon Grennan provides the following endorsement on the back cover of the first edition of March Book:

"Various in subject matter, consistent in their control of voice, at home in memory, fable, parable, the poems in March Book add up to a mature, surprising and extraordinarily lively first collection. Jesse Ball's imagination is at once mordant and playful, inhabiting and populating its world with a mixture of enigmatic observation and direct speech. He stands where the true poet should, in his properly vulnerable position, his motto: 'we are near a truth and daren't speak.' Like a fractured prism, his poems dissolve the self into other voices and remote situations, each one a glittering shard of some unspoken truth that offers itself 'resolute outside the haze of his own life.' There is, however, nothing hazy about the work, informed as it is by a verbally honed, sharply pointed steadiness of purpose. 'In these unruly days,' he says in one poem, 'even prayer may be true.' Combating unruliness with their curious mixture of surprise and formal grace, the poems of March Book insist on their own kind of truth, and are their own kind of oddly angled prayer."
