= The Girls (Cline novel) =

2016 novel by Emma Cline

The Girls: A Novel
- US first edition cover
- Author: Emma Cline
- Audio read by: Cady McClain
- Language: English
- Subject: Manson Family
- Genre: Fiction
- Published: 2016
- Publisher: Random House
- Publication place: United States
- Media type: Print, e-book, audiobook
- Pages: 368
- ISBN: 978-0812998603
- Dewey Decimal: 813/.6
- LC Class: PS3603.L547 G57 2016

The Girls is the 2016 debut novel by American author Emma Cline. It is loosely inspired by the Manson Family and the murder of actress Sharon Tate.

The majority of the novel, set in 1969, focuses on fourteen-year-old Evie Boyd, who, feeling isolated and unloved, spends her summer on a ranch with a group of teenage girls devoted to an aspiring musician named Russell Hadrick.

== Synopsis ==
In the present day Evie Boyd is a middle-aged woman with few ties. An old friend of hers named Dan allows her to stay in his home as a caretaker while he's away on vacation. While there she thinks that house is being broken into and comes to realize it is only Dan's teenage son Julian and his girlfriend Sasha who have arrived unannounced. Julian does not remember Evie at first but eventually recalls that Evie was involved in a famous cult. This makes Evie recall the summer of 1969, when she was fourteen.

It's 1969 and Evie's parents have divorced, with Evie's father moving in with his young assistant Tamar, and Evie's mother dating a married man named Frank. At this time, Evie spent most of her days with her best friend Connie, being bored in their hometown of Petaluma, California. Meanwhile, Evie ends up falling in love with Connie's older brother Peter.

All of this boredom is finally put to rest when Evie sees a group of ragtag girls hanging around the town and dumpster-diving. After Peter runs off with his pregnant girlfriend, Connie and Evie have a falling-out with Connie accusing Evie of only being there for her brother. Evie later runs into one of the girls she had seen, Suzanne, and buys her toilet paper she was trying to shoplift. Later on, after getting into a fight with her mother, Evie runs into Suzanne and the girls again. This time they bring her to the ranch on Edgewater Road where they live where they introduce her to Russell Hadrick, their enigmatic leader. Evie realizes that all the girls have sex with Russell. During her first visit Russell also forces her to perform oral sex on him.

Evie continues to visit the ranch and the girls over the course of the summer, stealing money from her mother to give to them and pretending that she is spending time with Connie. Evie is drawn more to Suzanne than Russell and continues to do what she can to spend more time with her. She also learns that Mitch Lewis, a famous singer, is a patron of Russell's and has promised to help him obtain a record deal. One day, when Mitch visits the farm Russell has Suzanne and Evie return to his home with them. Evie watches Suzanne and Mitch have sex and is later pressured into a threesome with them which she reluctantly goes along with as she is attracted to Suzanne.

After the threesome Evie returns home, but finding her life dull and tired she eventually returns to the farm. To cheer her up Suzanne takes her to break into an empty home. Evie suggests they break into her neighbour's home, but her neighbour arrives home early and catches her. Evie is punished by her mother and sent to live with her father in Palo Alto. Evie has a surprisingly good time there, spending most of her time with her father's young girlfriend Tamar, who treats her like a younger sister. Eventually though, Evie decides to return to the ranch. Running away from home Evie hitch-hikes and is driven to the ranch by a young university student named Tom, who is intrigued by Evie's description of the place. When they arrive Tom is disgusted by the air of decay while Evie is surprised to find the atmosphere of the ranch changed and depressed. Tom eventually leaves. Suzanne prepares to go out on an errand and Evie, chasing after her, is allowed to come along. As they are driving to Mitch Lewis's home Suzanne sees Evie looking at her with love and desperation and kicks her out of the car. Evie phones home and is picked up by Tamar. The following morning she learns that the group went to Mitch's house and, not finding him, killed his groundskeeper, the groundskeeper's girlfriend, an ex-girlfriend of Mitch's and her five year old son. Evie later learns this was because Mitch was unable to procure a record deal for Russell.

Evie finishes out the rest of the summer and is sent to a boarding school in Carmel, loosely based on Santa Catalina School. She settles down into student life but is visited once by her "sister" who turns out to be Suzanne. A few months later the girls and Russell are arrested and put on trial where they become infamous.

Evie continues to wonder whether she would have joined in the murders if Suzanne had not forced her out of the car. She also feels that Suzanne had been trying to get her to live a normal, ordered life, though she feels as though her life as an adult has been boring and unfulfilling while Suzanne was given multiple opportunities and infamy after her stint in prison.

== Reception ==
Ron Charles of The Washington Post wrote a favorable review, praising Cline's writing. NPR and The New York Times also reviewed the work, the former of which wrote that "Emma Cline's thoroughly seductive debut novel, The Girls, re-imagines the world of Charles Manson's female followers, and does so with a particularly effective literary device." It was the winner of the Shirley Jackson Award for Best Novel 2016.

Publishers Weekly gave the debut a starred review and said "The novel’s title is apt: Cline is especially perceptive about the emulation and competition, the longing and loss, that connect her novel’s women and their difficult, sometimes destructive passages to adulthood."

Kirkus Reviews had a more mixed response to the novel, noting "Cline makes old news fresh, but she also succumbs to an MFA’s fondness for strenuously inventive language." Though, ultimately the book was found to be "vivid and ambitious."
