= The White Desert (1922 film) =

1922 film

- Directed by: Ernst Wendt
- Written by: Einar Stier; Ernst Wendt
- Produced by: John Hagenbeck
- Starring: Carl de Vogt; Eduard von Winterstein; Nora Swinburne
- Cinematography: Mutz Greenbaum
- Production company: John Hagenbeck-Film
- Release date: 14 July 1922
- Running time: 100 minutes
- Country: Germany
- Languages: Silent; German intertitles

The White Desert (German: Die weisse Wüste) is a 1922 German silent adventure film directed by Ernst Wendt and starring Carl de Vogt, Eduard von Winterstein, and Nora Swinburne.

Die weisse Wüste (1922)

== Cast ==
- Carl de Vogt as Sigurd
- Eduard von Winterstein as Iwan
- Nora Swinburne as Karin
- Cläre Lotto as Liv
- Max Kronert as Lars
- Karl Balta as Gaustad
- Maria Bauer as Signe
- Dita Borissowa as Karin
- Fritz Orwa as Björn
- Frieda Siewert-Michels as Alma Troll
- Emil Stammer as Amtmann

== Bibliography ==
- Grange, William (2008). Cultural Chronicle of the Weimar Republic. Lanham, MD: Scarecrow Press. ISBN 978-0-8108-5967-8.
