= The Guest (novel) =

2023 novel by Emma Cline

- 2023 book cover
- Author: Emma Cline
- Audio read by: Carlotta Brentan
- Subject: Fiction - impersonation, homelessness, social classes, women
- Genre: Literary fiction
- Set in: Long Island, New York
- Published: May 2023
- Publisher: Chatto & Windus, Random House
- Publication place: United States, United Kingdom
- Media type: Print, E-book, Audio
- Pages: 290
- ISBN: 9780812998627 9780812988031
- OCLC: 1477495903
- LC Class: PS3603.L547

The Guest is the second novel written by Emma Cline. The story takes place over five summer days. A 22-year-old woman named Alex, working as a professional escort from New York City, sojourns through the moneyed enclaves situated in the Hamptons of Long Island, New York. The story narrates her experiences in places where she does not and cannot belong. This book was published in 2023 by Chatto & Windus in the United Kingdom and Random House in the United States.

== Plot ==
The novel begins with the protagonist, Alex, as a woman in her early twenties and who is the companion of fifty-five year old Simon in a Long Island area predominantly inhabited by the exceedingly wealthy. Alex's error in judgment during a social function, along with her damaging his car, prompts Simon to kick Alex out of his house, instructing his assistant to take her to the closest train station and purchase her a one-way ticket back to New York City.

Cognizant of that which she stands to lose due to her mistakes, and determined to avert a permanent dismissal by Simon, Alex resolves to remain in the area until Simon’s Labor Day party, aiming to surprise him and achieve a reconciliation. She leaves Simon's house with few possessions such as a couple of changes of clothes, the other contents in her bag, and a malfunctioning mobile phone. During her five day sojourn, Alex engages with Long Island strangers to secure meals and accommodation. This involves intruding upon a party hosted by teenagers, establishing a connection with a house manager of a private property, and capitalizing on the presence of a young boy to gain admission to an exclusive beach club, subsequently billing food and drink to his parents' account.

Alex is depicted as adept at quickly diagnosing social situations, seeming to always to know what to say. But she does not do this so that others will feel at ease, but rather, so she can exploit people's natural avoidance of embarrassment and their resultant feelings of discomfort. She is able to channel their discomfort into thoughts and feelings sympathetic to her.

== Critical reception ==
The New York Times said: "... under Cline’s command, every sentence as sharp as a scalpel, a woman toeing the line between welcome and unwelcome guest becomes a fully destabilizing force. And not just for her hosts, but for the novel itself." Ron Charles of The Washington Post compared the grift and grifter narrated throughout this novel with Jay Gatsby "who a century ago imagined he could insinuate himself into these people’s lives."

The Financial Times said: "The Guest is at its most unsettling when blurring the line between sex work and the exchange of undesired attentions for a secure refuge from the world... The climactic final pages, with their dramatic shift in tone, exhibit Cline’s writing at its very best — hypnotically propulsive, viscerally disquieting, and moving in the most unpredictable ways."

Esquire magazine said: "Dreamlike and disaffected, this charged study of class and gender lingers like a bad sunburn."The Guardian said that this work is engaging and thought-provoking, with a hint of danger. It seems simple, but it's actually quite complex and original.

In a starred review, Kirkus Reviews called the novel "A propulsive read starring an irresistible antihero."

In a positive review, Publishers Weekly noted that "Cline has a keen eye for class differences and makes Alex into an intriguing protagonist who has learned to be observant, but must also recognize she’s losing her judgment if she wants to survive. Like watching a car crash, this is hard to look away from."

== About the book ==
The narrative expresses Alex's perspective throughout the story from a third person point of view. In May 2023, an exclusive excerpt from Cline's second novel The Guest appeared in Vogue. The author, Emma Cline, has said that part of the novel was inspired by John Cheever's short story "The Swimmer." The Guest was a national bestseller and was longlisted for the PEN/Faulkner Award.

The ending of the book has generated a significant amount of public commentary. Chris Bohjalian of The Washington Post says that this novel "concludes without a conclusion," and he offers "some thoughts" on that. Vanity Fair magazine also noticed what appeared to be a baffling ending. Hence: "Vanity Fair staff and friends debate". The editors of Vulture magazine also wonder about the ending.

== Film adaptation ==
In October 2026, it was announced that A24 and Square Peg were in negotiations to purchase rights to a film adaptation of the novel. They beat out multiple buyers for the novel which was set up with Sadie Sink to star and Lorene Scafaria as writer and director.
