= Plimpton Prize =

Award for fiction

The Plimpton Prize is an annual award of $10,000 given by The Paris Review to a previously unpublished or emerging author who has written a work of fiction that appeared in its quarterly magazine.

The award was named in honor of longtime editor of The Paris Review, George Plimpton, who died in 2003. The Plimpton Prize is funded by Sarah Plimpton, his widow, and Terry McDonell, president of The Paris Review Board of Directors.

== Winners of the Plimpton Prize ==
- 1993: Macia Guthridge, for Bones
- 1994: Vikram Chandra, for Dharma"
- 1995: Lise Goett, for Three Poems
- 1996: Elizabeth Gilbert, for The Famous Torn and Restored Lit Cigarette Trick
- 1997: Martin McDonagh, for The Cripple of Inishmaan
- 1998: Julie Orringer, for When She Is Old and I Am Famous
- 1999: Daniel Libman, for In the Belly of the Cat
- 2000: Karl Iagnemma, for On the Nature of Human Romantic Interaction
- 2001: John Barlow, for Eating Mammals
- 2002: Wells Tower, for The Brown Coast
- 2003: Yiyun Li, for Immortality
- 2004: Malinda McCollum, for The Fifth Wall
- 2007: Benjamin Percy, for Refresh, Refresh
- 2008: Jesse Ball, for The Early Deaths of Lubeck, Brennan, Harp, and Carr
- 2009: Alistair Morgan, for Departure
- 2010: Caitlin Horrocks, for At the Zoo
- 2011: April Ayers Lawson, for Virgin
- 2012: Amie Barrodale, for William Wei
- 2013: Ottessa Moshfegh, for Disgust and Bettering Myself
- 2014: Emma Cline, for Marion
- 2015: Atticus Lish, for Preparation for the Next Life
- 2016: David Szalay, for Youth and Lascia Amor e siegui Marte
- 2017: Alexia Arthurs, for Bad Behavior
- 2018: Isabella Hammad, for Mr. Can’aan
- 2019: Kelli Jo Ford, for Hybrid Vigor
- 2020: Jonathan Escoffery, for Under the Ackee Tree
- 2021: Eloghosa Osunde, for Good Boy
- 2022: Chetna Maroo, for Brothers and Sisters
- 2023: Harriet Clark, for Descent
- 2024: Moira McCavana, for Every Hair Casts a Shadow
- 2025: Elijah Bailey, for Social Promotion
- 2026: Renny Gong, for Ping-Pong Kids
