= The Path of Death =

1917 film directed by Robert Reinert

- Maria Carmi and Carl de Vogt
- Directed by: Robert Reinert
- Written by: Robert Reinert
- Produced by: Hanns Lippmann
- Starring: Maria Carmi; Carl de Vogt; Conrad Veidt
- Production company: Deutsche Bioscop
- Distributed by: Deutsche Bioscop
- Release date: February 1917
- Running time: 75 minutes
- Country: Germany
- Languages: Silent; German intertitles

The Path of Death (German: Der Weg des Todes) is a 1917 German silent drama film directed by Robert Reinert and starring Maria Carmi, Carl de Vogt and Conrad Veidt. It marked the screen debut of Veidt. The film was shot in late 1916, but released the following year. It is a lost film.

The film's sets were designed by the art director Robert A. Dietrich.

== Plot ==
The Count and Countess are happily married, but start being harassed by a stranger. To escape the unwanted attention, the couple leave the country and move into an old castle. The stranger pursues them there and, at a party, forces Countess Marie to agree to meet him that night. During the meeting, she realises he is her former lover, Rolf, with whom she had a relationship when she worked as a prostitute years prior, and that he wants to have her again. The Countess leads Rolf through the castle and into the dungeons, imprisoning him there. Her guilty conscience forces her to confess everything to the Count. After he forgives her, she goes to free Rolf from the dungeon, but she inhales toxic fumes and dies on the castle stairs.

== Cast ==
- Maria Carmi as Countess Marie
- Carl de Vogt as Count
- Conrad Veidt as Rolf

== Bibliography ==
- Bock, Hans-Michael & Bergfelder, Tim. The Concise CineGraph. Encyclopedia of German Cinema. Berghahn Books, 2009.
