= The Lord of the Beasts =

1921 film

- Directed by: Ernst Wendt
- Written by: Arthur Kohnke; Ernst Wendt
- Starring: Carl de Vogt; Cläre Lotto; Anna von Palen; Dora Bergner
- Cinematography: Carl Hoffmann; Gotthardt Wolf
- Production company: John Hagenbeck-Film
- Release date: 17 August 1921
- Country: Germany
- Languages: Silent; German intertitles

The Lord of the Beasts (German: Der Herr der Bestien) is a 1921 German silent drama film directed by Ernst Wendt and starring Carl de Vogt, Cläre Lotto, and Anna von Palen. It premiered in Berlin on 17 August 1921.

== Cast ==
- Carl de Vogt
- Cläre Lotto
- Anna von Palen
- Henry Bender
- Dora Bergner
- Bruno Eichholz
- Madge Jackson
- Heinrich Marlow
- Josef Rehberger

== Bibliography ==
- Grange, William (2008). Cultural Chronicle of the Weimar Republic. Lanham, MD: Scarecrow Press. ISBN 978-0-8108-5967-8.
