= The Divers' Game =

2019 novel by Jesse Ball

- Author: Jesse Ball
- Language: English
- Genre: Dystopian
- Publisher: Ecco Press
- Publication date: September 10, 2019
- Publication place: United States
- Pages: 240
- ISBN: 9780062676115

The Divers' Game is a 2019 dystopian novel by American author Jesse Ball.

== Synopsis ==
The society of The Divers' Game is divided between two classes: pats, citizens who are allowed to kill the other class, and quads, immigrants branded as such on the cheek.

The novel is told from four perspectives, the first from two pats, the second from a quad girl, the third from a quad boy playing in a river with other children, which is eponymous with the novel, and the fourth an epistolary from a wife to her husband.

== Reception ==
The Divers' Game received positive reviews from critics. Katy Waldman of The New Yorker compared the novel's second perspective to the writing of Shirley Jackson, overall writing "[t]he novel's focus on empathy may open it to charges of sentimentality, but there is little in The Divers' Game to flatter the hope that people have any interest in treating each other well. Ball, instead, conveys a warm pity, or a mediated grace." David Hayden of The Guardian wrote "[t]he US author Jesse Ball's novel is a haunting and deeply felt parable about duty, morality and violence. In its three interlinked sections, continuous narrative and character development are less important than the creation of an intensely felt allegorical universe, which is as compressed and compelling as a folk tale." Jason Heller of NPR wrote "[i]f dystopian stories serve as thought experiments, the best ones also function as heart experiments. And with The Divers' Game, Jesse Ball has unsettlingly accomplished both." Spencer Ruchti of The Rumpus wrote "[t]o drink from the river Lethe [the river in the novel], Ball seems to say, is to indulge not in peace, but an awful violence of our own making." Jim Rutman of Publishers Weekly wrote "the novel's depiction of life in this dystopian world is eerie and suffused with symbolic weight." Chelsea Leu of The New York Times wrote "[i]t's hard to read a book like The Divers' Game — in which an unnamed nation receives an influx of refugees and abandons the notion of human fellow feeling — and not immediately think of the present moment, with its constant news of border atrocities." In a separate review in The Guardian, Holly Williams wrote "Ball writes with a plainness that belies the frequent horrors. Most chilling is the first section, written in the voice of the regime, addressing us with a sing-song, inviting quality: "Have you ever seen so many gas masks in one place?""
