= Helmar Lerski =

Photographer (1871–1956)

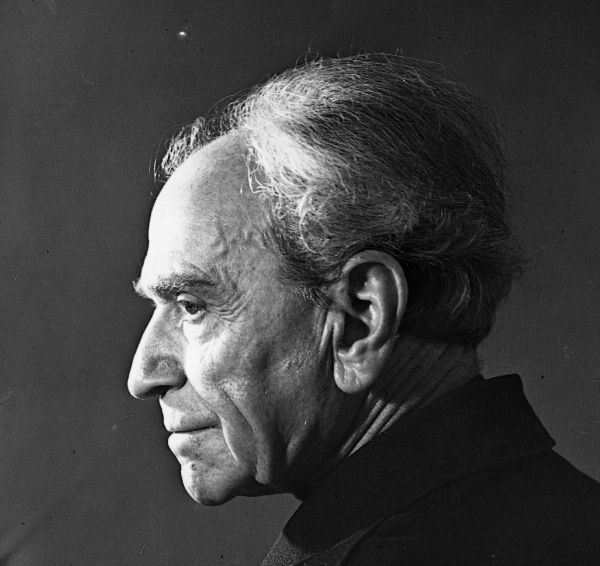
Portrait of Helmar Lerski, 1946

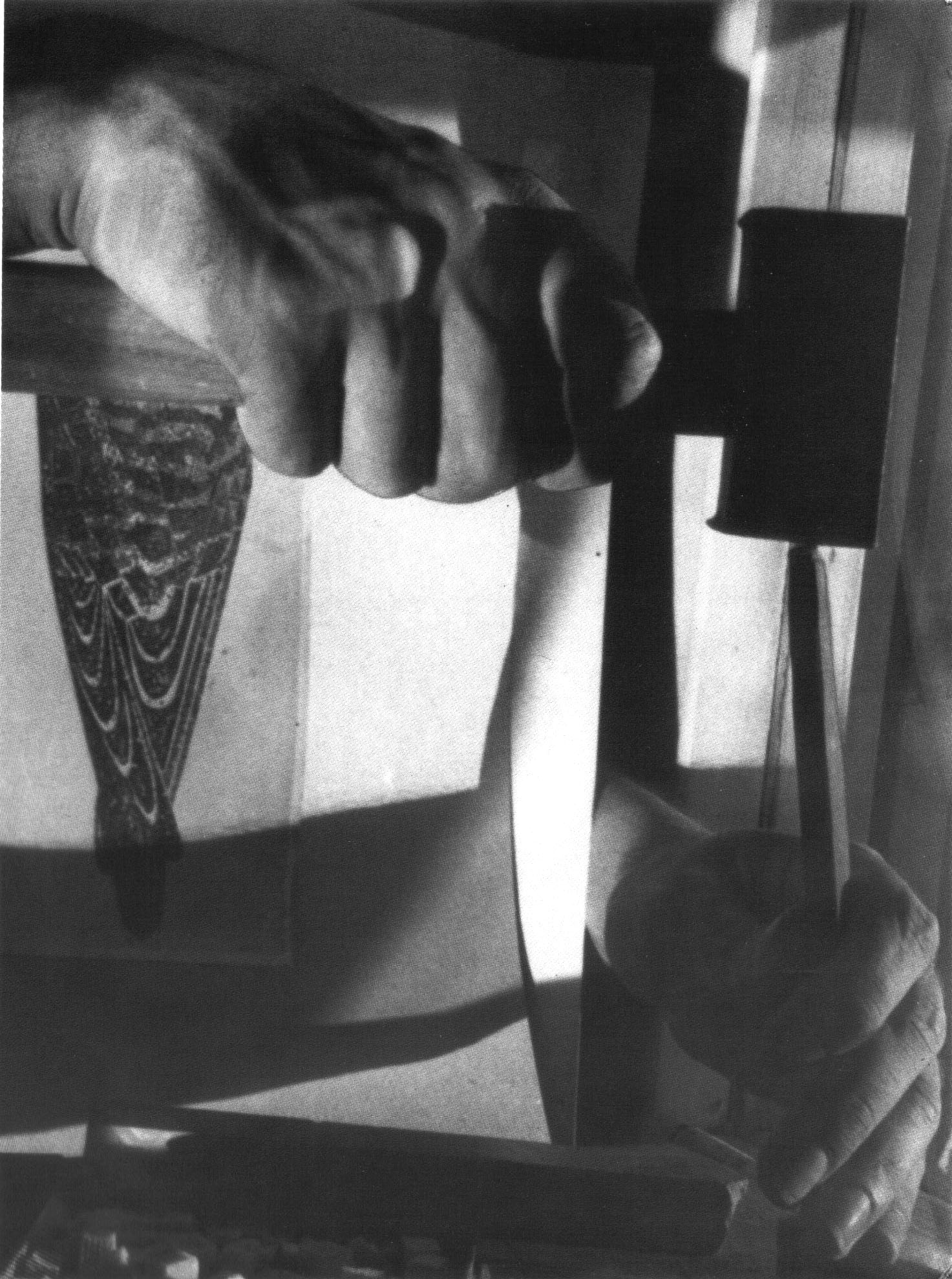
Working hands (1933–1940)

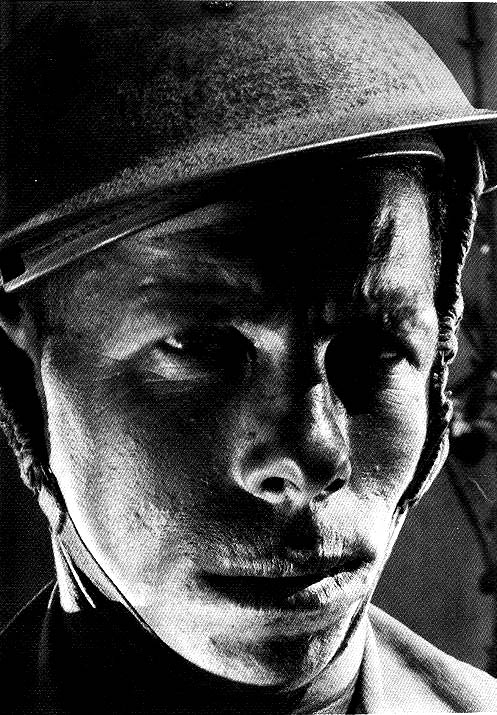
From the series Jewish soldiers (1942–1943)

Helmar Lerski (18 February 1871, in Strasbourg – 19 September 1956, in Zürich) was a photographer who laid some of the foundations of modern photography. His works are on display in the US, Germany, Israel and Switzerland. He focused mainly on portraits and the technique of photography with mirrors.

His birth name was Israel Schmuklerski. In 1876, the family moved to Zürich, Switzerland, where the family was naturalized. In 1888, Lerski emigrated to the United States, where he worked as an actor. Around 1910, he began to photograph. In 1915, he returned to Europe and worked as a cameraman and expert for special effects for many films, including Fritz Lang's Metropolis. At the end of the 1920s, he made a name as an avant-garde portrait photographer.

In 1932, he emigrated with his second wife to Mandate Palestine, where he continued to work as a photographer, cameraman, and film director. On 22 March 1948, they left what was by then Israel and settled again in Zürich.

== Photographic work ==
- Series Köpfe des Alltags: 1928–1930, published 1931
- Series Metamorphosen: 1936, published 1982

== Selected filmography ==
- When the Dead Speak (1917)
- Maria Pavlowna (1919)
- Children of Darkness (1921)
- The False Dimitri (1922)
- A Dying Nation (1922)
- Inge Larsen (1923)
- The New Land (1924)
- The Wig (1925)
- The Holy Mountain (1926)
- Adamah (1948)

== See also ==
- Fred Dunkel

== Publications ==
- Lerski, H.: Köpfe des Alltags, Berlin: Verlag Hermann Rockendorf, 1931.
- Ebner, F.: Metamorphosen des Gesichts. Die "Verwandlungen durch Licht" von Helmar Lerski. Steidl Verlag, Göttingen 2002. ISBN 3-88243-808-8.
- Eskildsen, U. (ed.); Lerski, H.: Verwandlungen durch Licht. Metamorphosis through Light,, Freren: Luca, 1982.
- Eskildsen, U.; Horak, J.-C.: Helma Lerski, Lichtbildner. Fotografien und Filme 1910-1947, Folkwang Essen 1982.
