= Robert Reinert =

German film director and screenwriter (1872–1928)

Poster for Nerven

Robert Reinert (born 22 April 1872 in Vienna; died 30 August 1928 in Berlin) was a German film director and screenwriter.

Born in Vienna, he moved to Munich around 1900. He wrote several novels, including Der Weg zur Sonne (1906) and Krieg (1907). His successful script for the film Homunculus (1916) led him to direct several films, most notably Opium and Nerven. Nerven opened in Munich in 1919. People were hospitalized after watching the movie and one woman, after seeing it, woke up one night, went out on the street in her nightshirt and screamed "Now I am going to die! Now I am going to die!" About Nerven, one recent critic wrote "Nerven is a disorienting, highly experimental work. Released in 1919, before The Cabinet of Dr. Caligari (early 1920), it might have become a prototype of German Expressionist cinema if it had been widely seen."

Reinert married actress Thea Steinbrecher in 1921. Reinert's films were not a commercial success, and in 1925 he got a job with UFA, where he worked until his death of a heart attack in 1928.

== Selected filmography ==
- Homunculus (1916)
- The Path of Death (1917)
- When the Dead Speak (1917)
- Ahasver, 1. Teil, Wandering Jew Journey, (1917)
- Ahasver, 3. Teil: Das Gespenst der Vergangenheit, Ghost of the Past, (1917)
- Ahasver, 2. Teil (1917)
- Der Herr der Welt (1918)
- Nerven (1919)
- Opium (1919)
- A Dying Nation (1922, 2 parts)
- The Four Last Seconds of Quidam Uhl (1924)
- Countess Ironing-Maid (1926)
- The Bordellos of Algiers (1927)
- Eva and the Grasshopper (1927)
- Die Todesschleife (1928) (Script)
- The Mysterious Mirror (1928)
