= The Curfew (novel) =

2011 novel by Jesse Ball

- First edition
- Author: Jesse Ball
- Language: English
- Published: 2011
- Publisher: Vintage Books
- Publication place: United States
- Pages: 204 pages
- ISBN: 978-0307739858

The Curfew is a 2011 novel by Jesse Ball. It was published by Vintage Books. The book is about authoritarian control, family bonds, and a dystopian setting.

== Plot ==
William Drysdale was a concert violinist before the City outlawed music and succumbed to chaos. He makes his living as an epitaphorist, writing epitaphs for the gravestones of the dead, as well as those expecting to die soon. His epitaphs are often fictional inventions to provide the deceased's loved ones with a sense of meaning. William has an eight-year-old daughter named Molly. Molly is mute, but extremely intelligent. William and Molly play a game of intricate riddles to keep their imaginations alive.

The City has an unofficial curfew, encouraged by cryptic and ominous slogans by the government, where no one is safe out of their homes after 10 p.m. When an old friend claims he has information about William's wife who mysteriously vanished years ago, William is forced to go out after the curfew. Molly is watched by kindly elderly neighbors, the Gibbons. William meets with his friend, and discovers a secret gathering of artists and intellectuals who each night drink and talk about a secret revolution that happens naturally and requires no conscious effort. William is disturbed by the group, and, after receiving a file with documents about his wife's disappearance, he leaves.

Travelling across the city late at night, William must hide in the shadows to avoid danger. Meanwhile, Molly puts on a puppet show with Mr. Gibbons. The show is the story of William and Molly's mother's love story from Molly's perspective with her inventing the details from before she was born. The show's story ultimately takes the form of William's struggle to return home.

In reality William is captured and murdered by mysterious men who are most likely government agents. Molly ends the show with a scene taken from real life where her father told her that eventually she would be alone, but that she would be strong enough to survive.

== Literary significance and reception ==
The novel received very positive reviews from a number of critics. William Giraldi referred to it as "a spare masterwork of dystopian fiction, a fevered prose poem of society strangled by nefarious rule." Sam Sacks, writing in The Wall Street Journal: "Mr. Ball does not embrace uncertainty to advance a literary theory but to suggest that the imagination can create truths to compete with what is unbearable about reality."

A review in The New Yorker focused on the diversity of Ball's influences: "Ball’s fiction lies at some oscillating coordinate between Kafka and Calvino: swift, intense fables composed of equal parts wonder and dread. In previous books, the author—a poet with the mind of a cardsharp—has seemed giddy with his powers of invention, as his heroes (a mnemonist, a pamphleteer) scramble through labyrinths (a sanitarium for chronic liars, an inverted skyscraper plunging hundreds of feet underground).

Some critics felt Ball's experimental style detracted from the weight of the story. In the Chicago Tribune, Alan Cheuse complimented the novel's ambitions but was ultimately disappointed: "Ball simply does not manage to wring from his material either the emotion or the delight most readers require to persevere in a work that tends much more toward allegory or mock-fairy tale than realism."

Veronica Scott Esposito, writing in Los Angeles Review of Books, was far more critical. She found Ball's style alienating, writing, "Reading The Curfew one so often feels that Ball draws on clever gestures to stress his points, giving into indulgences that diminish the form and substance of his book."
