= Steven Spielberg Jewish Film Archive =

Archive of Jewish documentary films

The Steven Spielberg Jewish Film Archive is dedicated to the preservation and research of Jewish documentary films. The archive is jointly administered by the Abraham Harman Institute of Contemporary Jewry at the Hebrew University of Jerusalem and the Central Zionist Archives of the World Zionist Organization (WZO).

== History ==
The archive was established in the late 1960s by Professor Moshe Davis and other historians of the Hebrew University of Jerusalem. The archive was originally called the Avraham Rad Jewish Film Archive for a number of years. In 1973, the WZO designated the archive as the official depository for its films. Since 1988, the archive has been named after the Jewish-American filmmaker Steven Spielberg, whose foundation partially finances archive activities. In 1996, the archive moved to its present premises at the university's faculty of humanities on Mount Scopus.

== The collection ==
The archive holds approximately 16,000 titles: about 4,500 films, over 9,000 videos on various formats and roughly 600 DVDs are cataloged. The collection deals with a variety of Jewish subjects: Jewish history, the establishment of the State of Israel, immigration, Jewish communities in the Diaspora and the relationships between them and Israelis. The films come from diverse sources: primarily the WZO and the Hebrew University of Jerusalem but also other public bodies, such as the Jewish National Fund and private sources that either donate or deposit their films – mainly documentary filmmakers and their families. In addition, the archive possesses a number of collections deposited by various kibbutzim. The Steven Spielberg Archive holds the copyright for the films produced by its founding institutions – i.e., the WZO and the Hebrew University – and is authorized to sell user rights to broadcasting and production companies and all other interested parties. The films are kept in temperature controlled vaults, facilitating their preservation, as much as possible, in optimal conditions. Movies can be watched on 16 mm and 35 mm viewing tables, and on video players in U-Matic, Betacam, VHS, DVCAM, Mini DV, Super VHS and Betamax.

== Films ==
Viewers will receive a tangible and extensive picture of the development of the Jewish nation and the State of Israel during the 20th century until the present. The varied and rich collection contains several definitive moments in the history of the State and the Jewish people in the Diaspora: for example the "First Film of Palestine" depicts life during Ottoman rule in 1911; the film "Five Cities" in which five central Jewish communities were filmed in Poland, provides a concrete and chilling testament to the vibrant Jewish life existing there a few months before the Holocaust; the film "The Day Came" which describes the establishment of the State on 14 May 1948, includes the famous scene of the Declaration of Independence by David Ben-Gurion; there is also film of the Israeli Ambassador to the United Nations, Chaim Herzog, furiously tearing up the General Assembly resolution equating Zionism with racism.

Viewers can also see the establishment of different communities, both before and after the establishment of the State. Hadassah Organization presents the nascent medical profession in Israel. Films produced by the Hebrew University throughout the years, show not only the development of the University but also the changing face of Jerusalem. The film "Edge of the West" brings images of the Jews of Morocco, including poignant scenes of residents of an entire small Jewish village leaving on their way to Israel. In addition, influential Jewish figures, such as Rabbi Abraham Isaac Kook, Albert Einstein and Chaim Weizmann, among others, can be seen. The archive holds original copies of the Eichmann Trial, given by the American company that filmed the trial. The Israel State Archives granted the archive the right to distribute this material, after the original video reels were transferred to digital cassettes.

- Preservation and restoration: film reels and different video formats are held in optimal temperature and humidity controlled film vaults, thus facilitating their preservation. The films undergo periodic inspection to confirm that they have not been afflicted with any damaging chemical problems, such as vinegar syndrome. The archive has a number of damaged films, some of them unique copies, requiring restoration and reconstruction and from time to time – according to need and budget – they undergo restoration, thus saving the information contained in them for future generations.
- Digitization, accessibility and virtual cinema: to make films in the collection more accessible, the archive has acted as follows. Selected and important film reels have been digitized, transferred to DVD or uploaded to the Internet. During the last decade, the archive has developed its virtual cinema portal, containing about five hundred films for which it holds copyright. The films have been digitized and uploaded to an Internet site that operates currently as a channel on YouTube. Films can be viewed without charge. Basic information about the films is also given (year of production, duration of the film, general abstract and other technical details). The films are divided into a number of categories: Jewish communities, Holocaust and World War II, Pre-state and various facets of life in the State of Israel (Art, Health, Birth and Security, Cities and Rural Settlement). Funds for the project were generously donated by the American Friends of the Hebrew University in honor of Jack Valenti, former chairman of the Motion Picture Association of America. Movies can be found relatively easily by searching the archive's online catalog: by title, producer or keywords. Films in the virtual cinema can be viewed directly from the catalog by clicking on the links.
- Film research – Matis Library: The David Matis Collection contains press clippings, photographs and various documents on the production of Jewish and Israeli films over the years and of Jewish and Israeli filmmakers. It includes other print and photograph collections that have accumulated. Recently this collection was scanned and uploaded to the online, web-based database, Artlid.
- Production of showcase films: The Spielberg Archive is obliged to produce films using material in its holdings.
- from the Eichmann Trial presents a number of testimonies from the trial of the Nazi criminal;
- Jerusalem of Light was produced to mark the 40th anniversary of the re-unification of Jerusalem, contains segments from different motion pictures filmed during the 20th century and shows the development of Jerusalem from different angles;
- The White City produced in honor of Tel Aviv's 90th anniversary, presents images from the first decades of its existence.

== Publications ==
- No Matter What – Studies in the History of the Jewish Film in Israel, by Joseph Halachmi. Jerusalem, Steven Spielberg Jewish Film Archive, 1995. A collection of articles dealing with the history of cinema in Ottoman and Mandate Palestine from the end of the 19th century until the beginning of the 1930s.
- Films of the Holocaust – An Annotated Filmography of Collections in Israel, by Sheba F. Skirball. New York, Garland Publishing, inc.; Jerusalem, Steven Spielberg Jewish Film Archive, 1990. Filmography of films on the Holocaust held by different archives in Israel.
- Israel Newsreel Collection – 1932–1956. Edited by Wendy Luterman and Hillel Tryster, Jerusalem, Steven Spielberg Jewish Film Archive, 1992. A catalog of newsreels produced by Natan Axelrod.
- Israel Before Israel: Silent Cinema in the Holy Land, by Hillel Tryster, Jerusalem, Steven Spielberg Jewish Film Archive, 1995. The development of the cinematic industry in prestate Israel from the beginning of the 20th century.
- Fresh Wind – The First Zionist Film in Palestine 1899–1902, by Joseph Halachmi. Jerusalem, Carmel, 2009. The book, which was published with the support of the Spielberg Archive, deals with the first attempt to produce Zionist propaganda films at the beginning of the Zionist movement.
