= Machanayim =

Machanayim (Hebrew: מַחֲנַיִם, also spelled Machanaim) is a game similar to dodgeball that is frequently played in North American Jewish schools and summer camps. The name Machanayim comes from the Hebrew word meaning "two encampments" or, in this case, two teams.

== Rules ==
Game Play: Players are divided into two encampments and the room is split in two with the teams facing each other. The playing area does not extend all the way to the back of the room or court - the two far ends are left empty, and one volunteer, typically one of the better players, from each team is placed behind the opposing team. This player is called "the captain".

One or more balls are thrown into play at the start, although they are not yet activated (see below). The game is similar to Dodgeball, in that players try and throw a ball at opponents. When a player is hit, they are out.

The difference between Machanayim and Dodgeball is that when a player is out in Machanayim, they are still part of the game. Rather than leaving the court, the player goes to the end area behind the opposing team, joining the original volunteer from their team.

Activation: Balls are only eligible for use in getting others out once they have been "activated". To activate a ball, a player must throw it to any other player, on either team, without it hitting the ground. A ball is announced "alive" when it has been activated. As soon as the ball hits the ground, it is pronounced "dead" and needs resuscitation.

Ball Types: Almost any spherical mass can be used to play Machanayim, the only rule being that it must be easily catchable by most players. To that extent, very small balls (like a pea) or very large ones (like a weather balloon) should not be used. Basketballs are generally considered too heavy and can cause injury. Soccer balls and volleyballs or Rubber Playground balls are the most popular.

Winning: When one team runs out of players (they are all behind the opposing team), the captain goes into the middle. The captain has more than one "life" (can be up to 3) Some games allow the captain to give over one of his lives to another team player to give the captain respite. Once the captain is out 3 times, the other team wins.

== Similar games ==
Machanayim is similar to the German or Austrian variant of dodge ball called Völkerball.

In secular Yiddish speaking camps such as SKIF, the game is called Tzvey-fayern ("Two shoot").
