= Samedi the Deafness =

Novel by Jesse Ball

- Author: Jesse Ball
- Language: English
- Published: 2007 (Vintage Books)
- Publication place: United States
- Pages: 304 Pages
- ISBN: 978-0307278852

Samedi the Deafness is a 2007 novel by Jesse Ball. It is Ball's debut novel, and was published by Vintage Books.

== Plot ==
James Sim discovers a dying man in the park. The man's final word is, "Samedi." Later, Sim reads an article about a suicide that happened on the White House lawn, a note signed by "Samedi" is left at the scene. Sim soon finds himself hunted by mysterious men. He is eventually kidnapped and brought to a strange asylum, called the verisylum.

An official of the verisylum claims that lying is an illness specific to modern life, and informs Sim of the strange and seemingly arbitrary rules that everyone inside the building must follow. Sim meets a woman in yellow, she says her name is Grieve, but then multiple women in the verisylum claim to be named Grieve. In spite of Grieve's (who also refers to herself as Violet and Anastasia at other times, and may have a twin) lies, Sim falls in love with her.

Outside the verisylum, suicides continue to occur daily, each accompanied by a strange notes signed by Samedi. Sim must uncover the cryptic meanings behind the verisylum and the mysterious figure of Samedi before the end of the seventh day, when it is predicted a catastrophe of biblical proportions will occur.

== Major themes ==
The novel explores obsession, identity, and the flaws of memory.

== Literary significance and reception ==
Caryn James, writing in The New York Times, praised the novel: "Like the early Thomas Pynchon and more lately Colson Whitehead, Mr. Ball creates a world nearly identical to ours, which operates on one significantly different principle: Your most paranoid fears are likely to be true." The New Yorker wrote, "The hero's struggle to decipher the rules of the sanitarium is rendered in a series of exquisite set pieces, each one a clue in a puzzle whose solution is ultimately immaterial to its beauty."

Writing in The Millions, City on Fire author Garth Risk Hallberg noticed many of Ball's influences, including Kafka's The Castle and Murakami. He concluded, "In the end, the delights of Samedi the Deafness outweigh its flaws. Ball’s sensibility is, despite his many influences, entirely his own, and one can expect good things to come."
