= Baron Samedi (disambiguation) =

Baron Samedi is one of the Loa of Haitian Voodoo.

Baron Samedi may also refer to:

- Baron Samedi, a character in the TV series Heroes
- "Baron Samedi", a song on the 1974 album Sheet Music by British band 10cc
- "Baron Samedi", a character that appears in the second season of TV series Cloak & Dagger
- "Baron Samedi", a character that appears in the 1973 James Bond film Live and Let Die
