= Norina Matchabelli =

Italian actress (1880–1957)

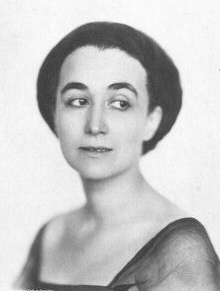
- Born: Eleanora Erna Cecilia Gilli; 3 March 1881; Florence, Kingdom of Italy
- Died: 15 June 1957 (aged 77); Myrtle Beach, South Carolina, U.S.
- Other name: Maria Carmi
- Occupations: Actress; perfumer
- Title: Princess
- Spouse(s): Karl Vollmöller; Prince Georges V. Matchabelli

Princess Norina Matchabelli (born Eleanora Erna Cecilia Gilli; 3 March 1881 – 15 June 1957) was co-founder of the perfume company Prince Matchabelli, a stage and screen actress, publisher, and a disciple of Indian spiritual teacher Meher Baba. Her stage name was Maria Carmi.

== Acting career as Maria Carmi ==
Gilli was born in Florence, Italy, the daughter of confectioner Luigi Gilli, originally from Samedan, and his wife Emma Troll from Winterthur. She was the youngest of five children and spent her youth in Florence and Fiesole.

She began her stage career at Max Reinhardt's acting school at the Deutsches Theater and belonged to his company from 1907 to 1909. Under the stage name Maria Carmi, she played in Italian and German theater and in silent films.

Her most notable performance was as the Madonna in the original spectacle-pantomime play The Miracle written by Karl Vollmöller whom she married in 1904. The play was originally produced in Germany. It opened in London on 23 December 1911 at the Olympia Arena. On 23 December 1923 it was revived in New York City on Broadway, then went on a tour of Detroit, Milwaukee and Dallas.

In the New York version she alternated nightly with Lady Diana Manners, another international beauty of the period. In all Norina gave over 1,000 performances of the play.

== Princess and perfume ==
After divorcing Vollmöller, Norina married in 1917 Georges V. Matchabelli, the Georgian prince, member of the House of Matchabelli and a diplomat, in Stockholm, Sweden. Georges was the Georgian ambassador to Italy until the 1921 Bolshevik takeover of Georgia, and lived in Rome. The couple moved to the United States in 1923. Georges was an amateur chemist and with Norina co-founded the now-famous perfume company Prince Matchabelli in 1926. In 1933, the couple divorced. Georges died in 1935 and in 1936 Norina sold the company to Saul Ganz for $250,000 ($5.8 million in 2025).

== Meher Baba ==
In 1931 Matchabelli met spiritual teacher Meher Baba and became a devotee. She introduced many notable figures of the day to Meher Baba including Gabriel Pascal, Mercedes de Acosta and Karl Vollmöller (her first husband). She also founded the periodical Meher Baba Journal in 1938.

In the early 1940s Matchabelli co-founded the Meher Spiritual Center with Elizabeth Chapin Patterson in Myrtle Beach, South Carolina, U.S.

In the 1940s Norina Matchabelli gave a series of well-attended public talks in Carnegie Hall and other places in which she said she was delivering "thought-transmission" messages directly from Meher Baba. When speaking, the personal "I" switched to "I, Meher Baba." This startled some of Meher Baba's followers and they questioned Baba on it in India, but he did not appear concerned.

== Death ==
Norina Matchabelli died at Youpon Dunes, Myrtle Beach, South Carolina, in 1957, aged 77. Her ashes were interred close by Meher Baba's samadhi on Meherabad Hill, near Ahmednagar, India. Her grave marker bears the inscription: Princess Norina was and will ever remain Baba's.

== Filmography ==
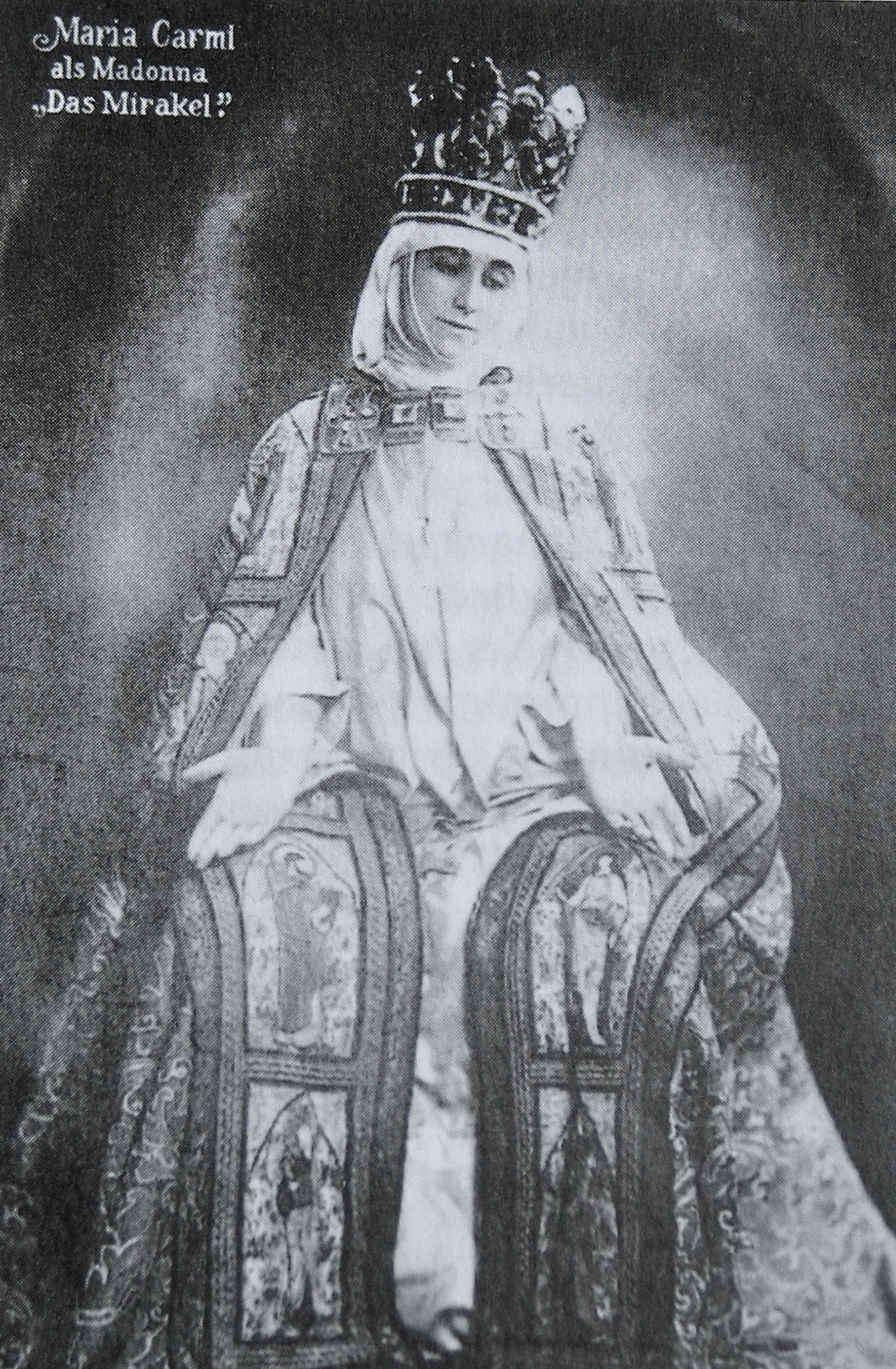
Maria Carmi in The Miracle, 1912)

- 1912: The Miracle
- 1914: Eine venezianische Nacht
- 1914: L'Accordo in minore
- 1914: Lost in the Dark
- 1915: Teresa Raquin
- 1915: Fluch der Schönheit
- 1915: Der Hermelinmantel
- 1915: Die rätselhafte Frau
- 1915: Sophias letztes Gesicht
- 1916: Das Wunder der Madonna
- 1916: Für den Ruhm des Geliebten
- 1916: Aphrodite
- 1916: Homunculus, Teil I
- 1916: Homunculus, Teil IV - Die Rache des Homunculus
- 1916: Der Pfad der Sünde
- 1916: Der Letzte eines alten Geschlechts
- 1916: Die Richterin von Solvigsholm
- 1916: Das Haus der Leidenschaften
- 1916: Der Fluch der Sonne
- 1917: The Path of Death
- 1917: When the Dead Speak
- 1917: Die Memoiren der Tragödin Thamar
- 1917: Rächende Liebe
- 1918: Das Spitzentuch der Fürstin
- 1920: Per il passato
- 1921: Forse che si, forse che no
