= Curfew (1925 film) =

1925 film

- Directed by: Conrad Wiene
- Written by: Hans Behrendt; Franz Adam Beyerlein (play); Conrad Wiene
- Starring: Harry Nestor; Cläre Lotto; Fritz Kampers
- Cinematography: Willy Goldberger
- Production company: Continental-Film AG
- Distributed by: Continental-Film AG
- Release date: 27 March 1925
- Country: Germany
- Languages: Silent; German intertitles

Curfew (German: Zapfenstreich) is a 1925 German silent drama film directed by Conrad Wiene and starring Harry Nestor, Cläre Lotto, and Fritz Kampers.

The film's art direction was by Max Knaake.

== Cast ==
In alphabetical order

- Carl Geppert as Rittmeister von Lehdenburg
- Bernhard Goetzke as Wachtmeister Volkhardt
- Owen Gorin as Leutnant von Lauffen
- Fritz Kampers as Sergeant Helbig
- Cläre Lotto as Klärchen
- Harry Nestor as Leutnant von Howen
- Karl Victor Plagge as Michalek
- Otz Tollen as Vizewachtmeister

== Bibliography ==
- Grange, William (2008). Cultural Chronicle of the Weimar Republic. Lanham, MD: Scarecrow Press. ISBN 978-0-8108-5967-8.
