= The Paris Review =

New York–based English-language literary magazine

- The Paris Review, Issue 1
- Editor: Emily Stokes
- Categories: Art, culture, interviews, literature
- Frequency: Quarterly
- First issue: Spring, 1953; 73 years ago
- Company: The Paris Review Foundation
- Country: United States
- Based in: New York City, U.S. (since 1973)
- Language: English
- Website: theparisreview.org
- ISSN: 0031-2037

The Paris Review is a quarterly English-language literary magazine established in Paris in 1953 by Harold L. Humes, Peter Matthiessen, and George Plimpton.

The Review's "Writers at Work" series includes interviews with Ezra Pound, Ernest Hemingway, T. S. Eliot, Jorge Luis Borges, Ralph Ellison, William Faulkner, Thornton Wilder, Robert Frost, Pablo Neruda, William Carlos Williams, and Vladimir Nabokov, among hundreds of others. Literary critic Joe David Bellamy wrote that the series was "one of the single most persistent acts of cultural conservation in the history of the world."

The headquarters of The Paris Review moved from Paris to New York City in 1973. Plimpton edited the Review from its founding until his death in 2003.

== History ==
=== 20th century ===
Postwar-World War II Paris offered a vibrant and affordable literary scene that attracted many writers on the G.I. Bill and provided creative independence from the U.S. publishing establishment. An editorial statement by William Styron in the inaugural Spring 1953 issue described the magazine's intended aim:

The Paris Review hopes to emphasize creative work—fiction and poetry—not to the exclusion of criticism, but with the aim in mind of merely removing criticism from the dominating place it holds in most literary magazines. […] I think The Paris Review should welcome these people into its pages: the good writers and good poets, the non-drumbeaters and non-axe-grinders. So long as they're good.

The Review's founding editors included Humes, Matthiessen, Plimpton, William Pène du Bois, Thomas Guinzburg, and John P. C. Train. The first publisher was Prince Sadruddin Aga Khan. Du Bois, the magazine's first art editor, designed the iconic Paris Review eagle to include both American and French representation: An American eagle holding a pen and wearing a Phrygian cap.

The magazine's first office was located in a small room of the publishing house Éditions de la Table ronde. Other notable locations of The Paris Review include a Thames River grain carrier anchored on the Seine from 1956 to 1957. The Café de Tournon in the Rue de Tournon on the Rive Gauche was the meeting place for staffers and writers, including du Bois, Plimpton, Matthiessen, Alexander Trocchi, Christopher Logue, and Eugene Walter.

The first-floor and basement rooms in Plimpton's 72nd Street apartment became the headquarters of The Paris Review when the magazine moved from Paris to New York City in 1973. The magazine's circulation was 9,700 in 1989.

=== 21st century ===
Brigid Hughes was appointed as the magazine's second editor (and first female editor) in January 2004, following Plimpton's death the prior year. The last issue that was published during her tenure as editor-in-chief is the March 2005 edition.

Hughes was succeeded by Philip Gourevitch in spring 2005. Under Gourevitch, the Review began incorporating more nonfiction pieces and, for the first time, regularly published a photography spread. A four-volume set of Paris Review interviews was published by Picador from 2006 to 2009. Gourevitch announced his departure in September 2009, citing a desire to concentrate more fully on his creative writing.

Lorin Stein was named editor of The Paris Review in April 2010. He oversaw a redesign of the magazine's print edition and its website, both of which were met with critical acclaim. In September 2010, the Review made available online its entire archive of interviews. On December 6, 2017, Stein resigned in response to an internal investigation into allegations of sexual harassment and misconduct toward women in the workplace.

In October 2012, The Paris Review published an anthology, Object Lessons, comprising a selection of 20 short stories from The Paris Review's archive, each with an introduction by a contemporary author. Contributors include Jeffrey Eugenides (with an introduction to a story by Denis Johnson), Lydia Davis (with an introduction to a story by Jane Bowles), and Ali Smith (with an introduction to a story by Lydia Davis).

On October 8, 2012, the magazine launched its app for the iPad and iPhone. Developed by Atavist, the app includes access to new issues, back issues, and archival collections from its fiction and poetry sections—along with the complete interview series and the Paris Review Daily.

In November 2015, The Paris Review published its first anthology of new writing since 1964, The Unprofessionals: New American Writing from The Paris Review, including writing by well-established authors like Zadie Smith, Ben Lerner, and John Jeremiah Sullivan, as well as emerging writers like Emma Cline, Ottessa Moshfegh, Alexandra Kleeman, and Angela Flournoy.

In late 2021, for the first issue with Emily Stokes as editor-in-chief and Na Kim as art director, the journal was given a redesign by Matt Willey of Pentagram that hearkened back to the look that it had in the late 1960s and early 1970s: a minimalist style, a cover with a sans serif font and a great deal of white space, a smaller trim size, and paper that was physically softer.

=== CIA ===
In January 2007, an article published by The New York Times supported the claim that founding editor Matthiessen had been employed by the Central Intelligence Agency at the time of the magazine's founding and reported that he used The Paris Review as a cover while he was stationed in Paris, not a collaborator, for his spying activities. Historians such as Frances Stonor Saunders have noted that the Review was not directly funded by the CIA, although it operated within the same postwar network of literary and cultural institutions supported by the CIA-backed Congress for Cultural Freedom (CCF). Specifically, archival records indicate that The Paris Review occasionally benefited indirectly through the sale of reprints to CCF-affiliated journals such as Encounter and Preuves, and by sharing contributors and editors with those magazines. Matthiessen later expressed regret for his CIA involvement, maintaining that The Paris Review was editorially independent and was never directed or influenced by U.S. government interests.

== Emerging writers ==
Since its early years, The Paris Review has published the work of numerous emerging writers who later achieved significant literary recognition, including Philip Larkin, Adrienne Rich, V. S. Naipaul, T. Coraghessan Boyle, Mona Simpson, Edward P. Jones, Terry Southern, Nadine Gordimer, Jean Genet, Robert Bly, and Rick Moody. Selections from Samuel Beckett’s novel Molloy appeared in the fifth issue, and the magazine was among the first to recognize the work of Jack Kerouac with the publication of his short story “The Mexican Girl” in 1955.

Other notable works making their first appearance in The Paris Review include Italo Calvino’s Last Comes the Raven, Philip Roth’s Goodbye, Columbus, Donald Barthelme’s “Alice”, Jim Carroll’s The Basketball Diaries, Peter Matthiessen’s Far Tortuga, Jeffrey Eugenides’s The Virgin Suicides, and Jonathan Franzen’s The Corrections.

In recent years, The Paris Review has continued to feature emerging voices. Aisha Sabatini Sloan contributes a monthly column, “Detroit Archives,” exploring her family history through iconic landmarks in Detroit.

== Writers at Work ==
"The interviews in The Paris Review […] are about as canonical, in our literary universe, as spoken words can be. They long ago set the standard […] for what well-brewed conversation should sound like on the page."

— Dwight Garner, The New York Times

An interview with E. M. Forster, an acquaintance of Plimpton's from his days at Kings College at the University of Cambridge, was the first in a long series of author interviews, now known as the "Writers at Work" series.

== Prints and posters ==
In 1964, The Paris Review introduced a series of prints and posters by contemporary artists with the goal of establishing an ongoing relationship between the worlds of writing and art—Drue Heinz, then publisher of The Paris Review, shared credit with Jane Wilson for initiating the series. In the half century since its inception, the series has featured notable New York artists of the postwar decades, including Louise Bourgeois, Willem de Kooning, David Hockney, Helen Frankenthaler, Keith Haring, Robert Indiana, Jimmy Ernst, Alex Katz, Ellsworth Kelly, Sol LeWitt, Roy Lichtenstein, Robert Motherwell, Louise Nevelson, Claes Oldenburg, Robert Rauschenberg, Larry Rivers, James Rosenquist, Ed Ruscha, and Andy Warhol.

The series, suspended after George Plimpton's death in 2003, was relaunched in 2012 with a print by Donald Baechler.

== Prizes ==
Three prizes are awarded annually by the editors of The Paris Review: the Paris Review Hadada, the Plimpton Prize, and the Terry Southern Prize for Humor. Winning selections are celebrated at the annual Spring Revel. Winners are selected from the stories and poems published the previous year in The Paris Review.

- The Hadada Award: a bronze statuette to be "awarded annually to a distinguished member of the literary community who has demonstrated a strong and unique commitment to literature". The award may go to a writer, reader, editor, publisher, publication, or organization. Past winners include Jamaica Kincaid, John Ashbery, Joan Didion, Norman Mailer, Peter Matthiessen, George Plimpton, Barney Rosset, William Styron, Philip Roth, James Salter, Paula Fox, Frederick Seidel, Norman Rush, Errol Morris, Edward Hirsch, Joy Williams, and Fran Lebowitz.
- The Plimpton Prize: $10,000 (and an engraved ostrich egg) awarded for the best work of fiction or poetry by an emerging or previously unpublished writer. Recent winners include Caitlin Horrocks, Wells Tower, Alistair Morgan, Jesse Ball, Emma Cline, and Benjamin Percy.
- The Terry Southern Prize for Humor: a $5,000 award honoring work from either The Paris Review or The Paris Review Daily that embodies the qualities of humor, wit, and sprezzatura. The prize is given in memory of longtime contributor Terry Southern. Past winners include David Sedaris, and other writers.

== Spring Revel ==
The Paris Review Spring Revel is an annual gala held in celebration of American writers and writing. The Revel "brings together leading figures and patrons of American arts and letters from throughout New York to pay tribute to distinguished writers at different stages of their careers". Proceeds from the Spring Revel go directly toward The Paris Review Foundation, a 501(c)(3) non-profit organization established by the co-founders in 2000 to ensure the future of the magazine.

The 2010 Spring Revel took place on April 13, 2010 and presented Philip Roth with the Hadada.

The 2011 Spring Revel took place on April 12, 2011, chaired by Yves-André Istel and Kathleen Begala. Robert Redford presented the Hadada to James Salter. The 2011 Revel also featured Ann Beattie presenting the Plimpton Prize for Fiction and Fran Lebowitz presenting the inaugural Terry Southern Prize for Humor. In 2012, Robert Silvers received the Hadada. In 2013, it was Paula Fox. In 2014, Frederick Seidel received the prize. In 2015, it was Norman Rush. In 2016, Errol Morris presented Lydia Davis with the Hadada and in 2017, Edward Hirsch presented Richard Howard with the Hadada. In 2018, Joy Williams received the prize from John Waters. Fran Lebowitz presented Deborah Eisenberg with the Hadada in 2019.
