= Ernst Lubitsch filmography =

This is a list of films directed by Ernst Lubitsch. He made a total of 70 films (47 feature films and 23 short films) in a career that spanned 4 decades.

== Director ==
=== Silent films ===
Year	Title	Studio	Genre	Cast	Notes	Other Roles
1910s
1914	Fräulein Seifenschaum; Miss Soapsuds	PAGU	Comedy	Ernst Lubitsch	Short film / Lost film	Writer, actor
1915	Aufs Eis geführt A Trip on the Ice	MaLu-Film	Comedy	Ernst Lubitsch, Albert Paulig	Short film / Lost film	Actor
1915	Blindekuh; Blind Man's Bluff	Union-Film	Comedy	Ernst Lubitsch, Ressel Orla	Short film / Lost film	Writer, actor
1915	Zucker und Zimt; Sugar & Spice	MaLu-Film	Comedy	Ernst Lubitsch, Ernst Matray, Helene Voss	Short film / Lost film	Producer, writer, actor
1915	Der erste Patient; His Only Patient	PAGU	Comedy	Ernst Lubitsch, Johanna Ewald	Short film / Lost film	Actor
1915	Der letzte Anzug; The Last Suit	PAGU	Comedy	Ernst Lubitsch	Short film / Lost film	Actor
1915	Der Kraftmeier; The Bully	PAGU	Comedy	Ernst Lubitsch	Short film / Lost film	Actor
1916	Als ich tot war (When I Was Dead) aka Wo ist mein Schatz? (Where is My Treasure?)	PAGU	Comedy	Ernst Lubitsch, Louise Schenrich, Helene Voss (as Lanchen Voss), Julius Falkenstein	Short film / Earliest surviving Lubitsch film	Writer, actor
1916	Shoe Palace Pinkus; Schuhpalast Pinkus	PAGU	Comedy	Ernst Lubitsch, Guido Herzfeld, Else Kentner		Actor
1916	Der gemischte Frauenchor; The Mixed Ladies Chorus	PAGU	Comedy	Ernst Lubitsch	Short film / Lost film	Actor
1916	Das schönste Geschenk; The Most Beautiful Gift	PAGU	Comedy	Ernst Lubitsch	Short film / Lost film	Actor
1916	Der G.m.b.H. Tenor; The Tenor, Inc.	PAGU	Comedy	Ernst Lubitsch, Ossi Oswalda, Victor Janson	Short film / Lost film	Actor
1917	Seine neue Nase; His New Nose	PAGU	Comedy	Ernst Lubitsch	Short film / Lost film	Actor
1917	Ossis Tagebuch; Ossi's Diary	PAGU	Comedy	Ossi Oswalda, Hermann Thimig	Short film / Lost film	Writer
1917	Der Blusenkönig; The Blouse King	PAGU; Messter Film	Comedy	Ernst Lubitsch, Käthe Dorsch, Max Zilzer	Short film / Lost film	Writer, actor
1917	When Four Do the Same; Wenn vier dasselbe tun	PAGU	Comedy	Emil Jannings, Ossi Oswalda, Margarete Kupfer	Short film	Writer, actor
1917	The Merry Jail; Das fidele Gefängnis	PAGU	Comedy	Harry Liedtke, Emil Jannings, Kitty Dewall		Writer, actor
1917	Käsekönig Holländer; Hollander, King of Cheese	PAGU	Comedy	Ernst Lubitsch	Short film / Lost film	Writer, actor
1918	Fuhrmann Henschel; The Coachman Henschel	Union-Film	Drama	Emil Jannings	Short film / Lost film	
1918	Prinz Sami; Prince Sami	PAGU	Comedy	Ernst Lubitsch, Ossi Oswalda	Short film / Lost film	Writer, actor
1918	The Toboggan Cavalier; Der Rodelkavalier	PAGU	Comedy	Ernst Lubitsch, Ossi Oswalda, Ferry Sikla	Short film / Lost film	Writer, actor
1918	The Rosentopf Case; Der Fall Rosentopf	PAGU	Comedy	Ernst Lubitsch, Trude Hesterberg	Short film / Partially lost	Writer, actor
1918	Die Augen der Mumie Ma; The Eyes of the Mummy Ma	PAGU	Horror	Emil Jannings, Pola Negri, Harry Liedtke		
1918	Ich möchte kein Mann sein I Don't Want to Be a Man	PAGU; UFA	Comedy	Ossi Oswalda, Curt Goetz, Ferry Sikla		Writer
1918	The Ballet Girl; Das Mädel vom Ballett	PAGU	Comedy	Ossi Oswalda, Harry Liedtke	Short film / Lost film	
1918	Carmen; Gypsy Blood	PAGU; UFA	Drama	Pola Negri, Harry Liedtke		
1919	Intoxication; Rausch	PAGU	Drama	Asta Nielsen, Alfred Abel	Lost film	
1919	Die Puppe; The Doll	PAGU	Comedy	Ossi Oswalda		Writer
1919	Meyer from Berlin; Meyer aus Berlin	PAGU	Comedy	Ernst Lubitsch, Ethel Orff		Actor
1919	My Wife, the Movie Star; Meine Frau, die Filmschauspielerin	PAGU	Comedy	Ossi Oswalda	Lost film	Writer
1919	The Swabian Maiden; Das Schwabemädle	PAGU	Comedy	Ossi Oswalda, Carl Auen	Short film / Lost film	Co-director
1919	Die Austernprinzessin; The Oyster Princess	PAGU	Comedy	Victor Janson, Ossi Oswalda		Writer
1919	Madame Dubarry; Passion	PAGU	Drama	Pola Negri, Emil Jannings		
1920s
1920	The Housing Shortage; Die Wohnungsnot	PAGU	Comedy	Victor Janson, Marga Köhler, Ossi Oswalda	Short film / Lost film	Writer
1920	Kohlhiesel's Daughters; Kohlhiesels Töchter	Messter-Film	Romance	Emil Jannings, Henny Porten		Writer
1920	Romeo and Juliet in the Snow; Romeo und Julia im Schnee	Maxim-Film	Comedy	Jacob Tiedke, Marga Köhler, Lotte Neumann		Writer
1920	Sumurun; One Arabian Night	PAGU	Drama	Ernst Lubitsch, Pola Negri, Paul Wegener		Writer, actor
1920	Anna Boleyn; Deception	Messter-Film; Union-Film / UFA	Drama	Emil Jannings, Henny Porten		
1921	Die Bergkatze; The Wild Cat	PAGU	Comedy	Pola Negri, Victor Janson		Writer, actor
1922	Das Weib des Pharao; The Wife of the Pharaoh aka The Loves of Pharaoh	Ernst-Lubitsch Film; EFA	Drama	Emil Jannings, Harry Liedtke		
1923	The Flame; Die Flamme	Ernst-Lubitsch Film; EFA	Drama	Pola Negri, Hermann Thimig	Partially lost	
1923	Rosita	Mary Pickford Co. United Artists	Romance	Mary Pickford, Holbrook Blinn		
1924	The Marriage Circle	Warner Bros.	Comedy	Adolphe Menjou, Marie Prevost		Producer
1924	Three Women	Warner Bros.	Drama	May McAvoy, Marie Prevost, Pierre Gendron		Writer
1924	Forbidden Paradise	Famous Players–Lasky	Comedy	Pola Negri, Adolphe Menjou		
1925	Kiss Me Again	Warner Bros.	Comedy	Marie Prevost, Monte Blue, Clara Bow	Lost film	
1925	Lady Windermere's Fan	Warner Bros.	Romance	May McAvoy, Ronald Colman		Producer, editor
1926	So This Is Paris	Warner Bros.	Comedy	Monte Blue, Patsy Ruth Miller		
1927	The Student Prince in Old Heidelberg	MGM	Romance	Ramón Novarro, Norma Shearer		Producer

=== Sound films ===
Year	Title	Studio	Genre	Cast	Notes	Other Roles
1920's
1928	The Patriot	Paramount	Drama	Emil Jannings, Florence Vidor	Lost film	Editor
1929	Eternal Love	Schenck Productions; United Artists	Romance	John Barrymore, Camilla Horn		
1929	The Love Parade	Paramount	Musical	Maurice Chevalier, Jeanette MacDonald		Producer
1930s
1930	Paramount on Parade	Paramount	Musical	Paramount all-star revue		Co-director
1930	Monte Carlo	Paramount	Musical	Jack Buchanan, Jeanette MacDonald		Producer
1931	The Smiling Lieutenant	Paramount	Musical	Maurice Chevalier, Claudette Colbert, Miriam Hopkins		Producer
1932	Broken Lullaby (aka The Man I Killed)	Paramount	Drama	Lionel Barrymore		
1932	One Hour with You	Paramount	Musical	Maurice Chevalier, Jeanette MacDonald		Producer
1932	Trouble in Paradise	Paramount	Comedy	Herbert Marshall, Miriam Hopkins		Producer
1932	If I Had a Million (segment "The Clerk")	Paramount	Comedy	Richard Bennett, Charles Laughton		
1933	Design for Living	Paramount	Comedy	Gary Cooper, Fredric March, Miriam Hopkins		Producer
1934	The Merry Widow	Metro Goldwyn Mayer	Musical	Maurice Chevalier, Jeanette MacDonald		Producer
1937	Angel	Paramount	Romance	Marlene Dietrich, Herbert Marshall, Melvyn Douglas		Producer
1938	Bluebeard's Eighth Wife	Paramount	Comedy	Claudette Colbert, Gary Cooper		Producer
1939	Ninotchka	Metro Goldwyn Mayer	Comedy	Greta Garbo, Melvyn Douglas		Producer
1940s
1940	The Shop Around the Corner	Metro Goldwyn Mayer	Comedy	James Stewart, Margaret Sullavan		Producer
1941	That Uncertain Feeling	Lubitsch Prod. Sol Lesser Productions	Comedy	Merle Oberon, Melvyn Douglas, Burgess Meredith		Producer
1942	To Be or Not to Be	Romaine Film Corp.	Comedy	Carole Lombard, Jack Benny		Producer
1943	Heaven Can Wait	Twentieth Century Fox	Romance	Gene Tierney, Don Ameche	First Technicolor film	Producer
1946	Cluny Brown	Twentieth Century Fox	Romance	Charles Boyer, Jennifer Jones		Producer
1948	That Lady in Ermine	Twentieth Century Fox	Musical	Betty Grable, Douglas Fairbanks Jr., Cesar Romero	Technicolor film	Co-director, producer

== Actor ==
- de:Die ideale Gattin (dir. Hanns Heinz Ewers, 1913), as Heiratsvermittler Krispin
- The Firm Gets Married (dir. Carl Wilhelm, 1914), as Moritz Abramowsky
- Bedingung – Kein Anhang! (dir. Stellan Rye, 1914), as Stella's husband
- Der Stolz der Firma (dir. Carl Wilhelm, 1914), as Siegmund Lachmann
- Miss Piccolo (dir. Franz Hofer, 1914), as Mr. Pinkeles
- Ein verliebter Racker (dir. Franz Hofer, 1915)
- Arme Marie (dir. Max Mack, Willy Zeyn, 1915), as Moritz Rosenthal
- Robert and Bertram (dir. Max Mack, 1915), as Max Edelstein
- Doktor Satansohn (dir. Edmund Edel, 1916), as Doktor Satansohn
- Der schwarze Moritz (dir. Georg Jacoby, 1916), as Moritz Apfelreis
- Leutnant auf Befehl (dir. Danny Kaden, 1916)
- Hans Trutz in the Land of Plenty (dir. Paul Wegener, 1917), as The Devil

== Producer ==
- A Royal Scandal (1945)
- Dragonwyck (1946)
