= The Doll (1919 film) =

1919 film directed by Ernst Lubitsch

Die Puppe
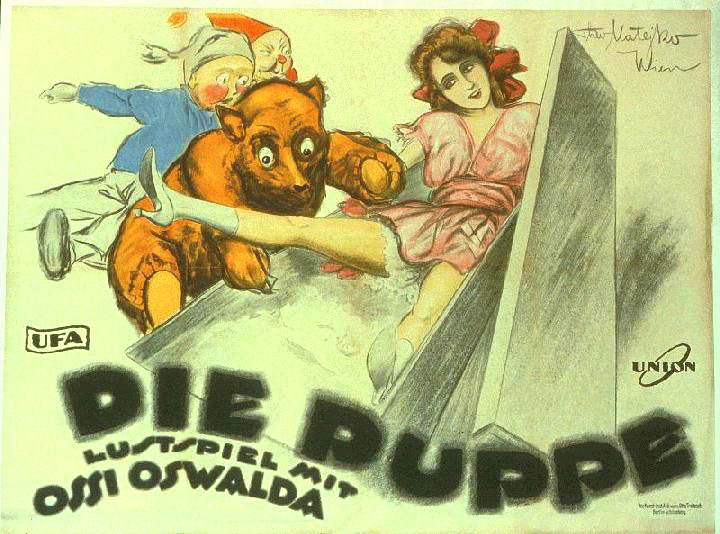
- Theatrical poster to The Doll (1919)
- Directed by: Ernst Lubitsch
- Written by: Hanns Kräly; Ernst Lubitsch
- Based on: La poupée (operetta) by; Edmond Audran; Maurice Ordonneau; Alfred Maria Willner; "Der Sandmann" (short story) by E. T. A. Hoffmann
- Produced by: Paul Davidson
- Starring: Ossi Oswalda; Hermann Thimig; Victor Janson
- Cinematography: Theodor Sparkuhl; Kurt Waschneck
- Production company: PAGU
- Distributed by: UFA
- Release date: 5 December 1919
- Running time: 70 minutes
- Country: Weimar Republic
- Language: Silent film

The Doll (1919) by Ernst Lubitsch

The Doll (German: Die Puppe) is a 1919 German romantic fantasy comedy film directed by Ernst Lubitsch. The film is based on the operetta La poupée by Edmond Audran (1896) and a line of influence back through the Léo Delibes ballet Coppélia (1870) and ultimately to E. T. A. Hoffmann's short story "Der Sandmann" (1816).

Lubitsch considered The Doll possibly his favorite film and one of his three best German comedy films, along with The Oyster Princess (1919) and Kohlhiesel's Daughters (1920). However, it was shown in America only in a few places and in 1928. Director Peter Bogdanovich saw the film in 1977; he wrote that it was "one of the five funniest pictures I've ever seen".

== Plot ==
Lubitsch himself places a dollhouse on a toy hill, then two dolls, a man and a woman, inside the house. The house becomes real, and the couple emerge. The man slips on the steep path and falls into a pool. After he is helped out of the water by the woman, the sun dries him off.

A town crier announces that the Baron of Chanterelle does not want his lineage to end, so he requests that maidens gather in the marketplace so his nephew and sole heir, Lancelot, can choose a wife. Lancelot and his nanny, the couple in the first scene, come to see the Baron. When the Baron tells Lancelot he should marry, Lancelot cries. Dozens of eager women (even those who have boyfriends) march to the Baron's mansion. Lancelot jumps out a window and flees, pursued by the women, the nanny, the Baron and the Baron's underling.

He goes to the abbey. The prior and his priests grant him sanctuary. Lancelot's uncle sends a message, offering him 300,000 francs as dowry if he will marry. The prior, deeply concerned about the abbey's financial situation, is delighted, but Lancelot is adamantly opposed. A priest comes up with a novel solution: Lancelot can marry a "life-like" doll made by the renowned dollmaker Hilarius which can walk, dance and sing with the push of buttons (and donate the dowry to the abbey).

Hilarius makes his latest doll look just like his daughter Ossi. Lancelot goes to his shop. While Hilarius is talking to him, the young apprentice dances with the doll, but it falls and its arm is broken off. Ossi sees this and tells the distraught boy to fix it, volunteering to pretend to be the doll in the meantime. Hilarius shows Lancelot a selection of his dolls and what they can do. However, Lancelot finds their behavior improper and demands one of "solid character". Hilarius has the apprentice bring the Ossi doll. After she punches Lancelot when he tries to kiss her, Lancelot purchases her.

Ossi rather likes Lancelot. On the carriage ride back, she pretends to malfunction twice, leaning into him. He kisses her.

They go to the Baron's mansion, where he is being hounded by people expecting things from his will. Lancelot explains away Ossi's odd behavior by telling his uncle that she comes from a very formal Prussian family. The Baron orders that the wedding proceed immediately. When Lancelot starts to undress Ossi to put on her wedding dress, she strikes him. When questioned, she nods to show she can undress and dress herself.

Meanwhile, Hilarius is astonished to find the Ossi doll. The apprentice confesses. Hilarius says, "This is truly hair-raising." His hair rises, then turns white. He chases the apprentice, who eventually escapes.

At the wedding, the Baron sends Lancelot to collect the dowry. While he is away, the Baron and Ossi dance. Then she dances with some of the guests. When Lancelot returns, he cannot find her. While he is searching, she returns to her seat. Lancelot rewinds her mechanism (tied to her back). When he berates her for disappearing, she stands up and yells back at him. He slaps her, so she slaps him back. Lancelot worries that he overwound her.

Afterward, Lancelot takes Ossi to the abbey. The prior relieves Lancelot of the dowry. He orders a priest to take the doll to the junk room, but she locks the priest in the room and heads to Lancelot's cell. When Lancelot enters, he assumes one of the priests put her there. He dreams of Ossi, then awakes to find her in his bed. She has trouble convincing him she is real. Her fear of a mouse finally persuades him. They embrace and escape the abbey.

Meanwhile, Hilarius tries to rescue his daughter. When he cannot hire a carriage, he buys balloons from a vendor and flies through the air. The apprentice steals a weapon from a sleeping guard and shoots the balloons. Hilarius lands in front of the couple. Furious at first, he is so relieved when Lancelot shows him the marriage certificate that his hair turns dark again.

== Cast ==
- Ossi Oswalda as Ossi / the doll
- Victor Janson as Hilarius, dollmaker
- Hermann Thimig as Lancelot
- Max Kronert as Baron of Chanterelle
- Marga Köhler as Hilarius' wife
- Gerhard Ritterband as the apprentice
- Jakob Tiedtke as the Prior
- Josefine Dora as Lancelot's nanny

== Analysis ==
Scott Eyman noted in Ernst Lubitsch: Laughter in Paradise that the film includes one of his trademark characters, "a bumptious, worldly-wise apprentice, who regularly breaks the fourth wall to address the audience".

== DVD releases ==
The film was released in the US by Kino Lorber, along with the documentary Ernst Lubitsch in Berlin, in 2007 with English intertitles. It was also released in the UK by Eureka's Masters of Cinema series as part of the box set Lubitsch in Berlin: Fairy-Tales, Melodramas, and Sex Comedies (2010) with German intertitles and English subtitles. It is also available in BluRay paired with I Don't Want to Be a Man (1918), released by Kino Lorber in 2023.

== Bibliography ==
- Wosk, Julie (2015). My Fair Ladies: Female Robots, Androids, and Other Artificial Eves. New Brunswick, NJ: Rutgers University Press. ISBN 978-0-8135-6339-8.
