= Vendetta (1919 film) =

1919 German silent drama film written and directed by Georg Jacoby

- Scene from as film
- German: Blutrache
- Directed by: Georg Jacoby
- Written by: Georg Jacoby; Léo Lasko
- Produced by: Paul Davidson
- Starring: Pola Negri; Emil Jannings; Harry Liedtke
- Cinematography: Theodor Sparkuhl; Fritz Arno Wagner
- Production company: PAGU
- Distributed by: UFA
- Release date: 22 August 1919
- Running time: 82 minutes
- Country: Germany
- Languages: Silent; German intertitles

Vendetta or Blood Revenge (German: Blutrache) is a 1919 German silent drama film directed by Georg Jacoby starring Pola Negri, Emil Jannings and Harry Liedtke. It was shot at the Tempelhof Studios in Berlin.

== Cast ==
- Pola Negri as Marianna Paoli
- Emil Jannings as Tomasso
- Harry Liedtke as Edwin Alcott
- Magnus Stifter as Count Danella
- Fred Immler as Antonio Paoli, Mariana's brother
- Emil Biron as Washington Irving
- Käthe Dorsch as Ruth Alcott
- Margarete Kupfer as Lady Crawford, Ruth's aunt
