= The Seeds of Life (film) =

1918 film

- German: Keimendes Leben
- Directed by: Georg Jacoby
- Written by: Georg Jacoby; Paul Meissner
- Produced by: Paul Davidson; Léo Lasko
- Starring: Emil Jannings; Hanna Ralph; Hans Junkermann
- Cinematography: Theodor Sparkuhl
- Production company: PAGU
- Distributed by: UFA
- Release dates: October 1918 (Parts I & II); 6 June 1919 (Part III)
- Running time: 234 minutes
- Country: Germany
- Languages: Silent; German intertitles

The Seeds of Life (German: Keimendes Leben) is a German silent drama film directed by Georg Jacoby and starring Emil Jannings, Hanna Ralph, and Hans Junkermann. It was released in three parts. The third part in the series was released as Moral und Sinnlichkeit.

It was made by the PAGU company at the Tempelhof Studios in Berlin. The film's sets were designed by the art director Kurt Richter.

== Cast ==
- Emil Jannings as James Fraenkel, Börsenmarktler / John Smith, amerikanischer Ingenieur
- Hanna Ralph as Marietta Fraenkel, Fabrikbesitzer
- Hans Junkermann as Friedrich Wechmar
- Martha Angerstein-Licho as Frau Wechmar
- Marga Lindt as Frau von Borowicz
- Adolf Klein as Dr. Thiel, Hausarzt bei Wechmars
- Grete Diercks as Liese Bräer
- Grete Sellin as Anna Beckmann
- Toni Zimmerer as Karl Beckmann
- Victor Janson as Graf Moros
- Margarete Kupfer
- Adolf E. Licho as Treugold, Literat
