= The Merry Jail =

1917 film directed by Ernst Lubitsch

- Directed by: Ernst Lubitsch
- Written by: Hanns Kräly; Ernst Lubitsch
- Produced by: Paul Davidson
- Starring: Harry Liedtke; Kitty Dewall; Emil Jannings
- Cinematography: Theodor Sparkuhl
- Production company: PAGU
- Distributed by: Union Film
- Release date: November 1917
- Running time: 56 minutes
- Country: Germany
- Languages: Silent; German intertitles

The Merry Jail (German: Das Fidele Gefängnis) is a 1917 German silent comedy film directed by Ernst Lubitsch. The script draws from the operetta Die Fledermaus by Johann Strauss II. Kurt Richter was the set designer, while Paul Davidson produced the film.

In 2010, the film was screened at the Locarno Film Festival, as part of a retrospective dedicated to Lubitsch.

== Plot ==
Alex von Reitzenstein has spent the night partying. His wife, Alice, finds him drunk under his desk. On top of that, the postman announces he will have to spend one night in prison for a disturbance of the peace. Alice receives an invitation to a masked ball at the palace of Prince Zsbrschowsky. Determined to appease her, Alex gives her money for a new hat. While shopping, Alice meets Egon Storch, who follows her home and is invited in for tea.

Meanwhile, the prison director Quabbe arrives at their home, but mistakes Egon for Alex and takes him instead. At the ball, Alice follows her inebriated husband and flirts with him in disguise. He fails to recognise her. The maid Mizi also uses the anonymity of the ball to engage with a rich drunk guest. Then, the misunderstandings are resolved, and Alex remorsefully returns to Alice.

== Cast ==
- Harry Liedtke as Alex von Reitzenstein
- Kitty Dewall as Alice von Reitzenstein
- Agda Nielson as Mizi, the maid
- Erich Schönfelder as Egon Storch
- Emil Jannings as Quabbe, the prison director
- Paul Biensfeldt
- Käthe Dorsch
- Ernst Lubitsch

== Reception ==
Contemporary critics complained "that Strauss's melodies, even the best ones, cannot be filmed. So all that remains is a pleasant little comedy." Other critics commented that while the film was an adaptation of "Die Fledermaus," it was "so happily put together, refreshed with so many charming ideas, and so briskly and vividly directed that one gladly overlooks this. [...] All in all: it was a resounding success!"
