= The Swabian Maiden =

- German: Das Schwabemädle
- Directed by: Georg Jacoby; Ernst Lubitsch
- Written by: Paul Meissner; Georg Jacoby
- Produced by: Paul Davidson
- Starring: Ossi Oswalda; Carl Auen; Hermann Böttcher
- Cinematography: Frederik Fuglsang
- Production company: PAGU
- Distributed by: UFA
- Release date: 21 February 1919
- Country: Germany
- Languages: Silent; German intertitles

The Swabian Maiden (Swabian German: Das Schwabemädle) is a 1919 German silent comedy film directed by Georg Jacoby and Ernst Lubitsch and starring Ossi Oswalda, Carl Auen and Hermann Böttcher.

It was shot at the Tempelhof Studios in Berlin.

== Cast ==
- Ossi Oswalda as Lorle Schmied
- Carl Auen as Uhrmachergeselle Christoph Bühler
- Fritz Achterberg as Sohn Fred Hausegger
- Hermann Böttcher as Kammerherr
- Aenderly Lebius as Fabrikbesitzer Ferdinand Hausegger
- Paul Passarge as Uhrmacher Johann Schmied
- Frl. von Basch as Hertha von Lossow
