= The Ballet Girl (1918 film) =

1918 film

- Directed by: Ernst Lubitsch
- Written by: Hanns Kräly
- Produced by: Paul Davidson
- Starring: Ossi Oswalda; Harry Liedtke; Margarete Kupfer
- Cinematography: Theodor Sparkuhl
- Production company: PAGU
- Distributed by: UFA
- Release date: 23 September 1918
- Country: Germany
- Languages: Silent; German intertitles

The Ballet Girl (German: Das Mädel vom Ballett) is a 1918 German silent comedy film directed by Ernst Lubitsch and starring Ossi Oswalda, Harry Liedtke and Margarete Kupfer.

It was shot at the Tempelhof Studios in Berlin. The film's sets were designed by the art director Kurt Richter.

== Cast ==
- Ossi Oswalda as Ossi, eine junge Tänzerin
- Margarete Kupfer as Ossis Mutter
- Ferry Sikla as Fürst Adolf von Dillingen
- Harry Liedtke as Dr. Fersen, Intendant des Hoftheaters
- Julietta Brandt as Prima Ballerina
- Victor Janson as Carambo di Gracho, Lebemann
- Reinhold Schünzel as Eduard Stutzig, Lebemann
- Joe Konradi as Brilliant, Theater-Agent

== Bibliography ==
- Thompson, Kristin (2005). Herr Lubitsch Goes to Hollywood: German and American Film After World War I. Amsterdam University Press. ISBN 978-90-5356-708-1.
