= The Toboggan Cavalier =

- Directed by: Ernst Lubitsch
- Written by: Ernst Lubitsch; Erich Schönfelder
- Produced by: Paul Davidson
- Starring: Ossi Oswalda; Harry Liedtke; Ernst Lubitsch
- Cinematography: Theodor Sparkuhl
- Production company: PAGU
- Distributed by: UFA
- Release date: 1 March 1918
- Country: Germany
- Languages: Silent; German intertitles

The Toboggan Cavalier (German: Der Rodelkavalier) is a 1918 German silent comedy film directed by Ernst Lubitsch and starring Ossi Oswalda, Harry Liedtke and Lubitsch.

It was shot at the Tempelhof Studios in Berlin. The film's sets were designed by the art director Kurt Richter.

== Cast ==
- Ernst Lubitsch as Sally Piner
- Ferry Sikla as Kommerzienrat Hannemann
- Ossi Oswalda as Ossi Hannemann
- Erich Schönfelder as Heiratskandidat
- Julius Falkenstein as Liebhaber
- Harry Liedtke

== Bibliography ==
- Kristin Thompson. Herr Lubitsch Goes to Hollywood: German and American Film After World War I. Amsterdam University Press, 2005.
