= The Rosentopf Case =

- Film poster by Josef Fenneker 1918
- Directed by: Ernst Lubitsch
- Written by: Ernst Lubitsch
- Produced by: Paul Davidson
- Starring: Ernst Lubitsch; Trude Hesterberg; Margarete Kupfer
- Cinematography: Alfred Hansen
- Production company: PAGU
- Distributed by: UFA
- Release date: 20 September 1918
- Country: Germany
- Languages: Silent; German intertitles

The Rosentopf Case (German: Der Fall Rosentopf) is a 1918 German silent comedy film directed by Ernst Lubitsch and starring Lubitsch, Trude Hesterberg and Margarete Kupfer.

It was shot at the Tempelhof Studios in Berlin. The film's sets were designed by the art directors Paul Leni and Kurt Richter.

== Cast ==
- Ernst Lubitsch as Sally, junger Mann des Detektiv Ceeps
- Trude Hesterberg as Bella Spaketti, Tänzerin
- Ferry Sikla as Rentier Klingelmann
- Margarete Kupfer as Dienstmädchen
- Elsa Wagner as Frau Hintze

== Bibliography ==
- Kristin Thompson. Herr Lubitsch Goes to Hollywood: German and American Film After World War I. Amsterdam University Press, 2005.
