= Hundemamachen =

1920 film

- Directed by: Rudolf Biebrach
- Written by: Georg Jacoby; Hanns Kräly
- Produced by: Paul Davidson
- Starring: Ossi Oswalda; Emil Biron; Ferry Sikla
- Cinematography: Willy Gaebel
- Production company: PAGU
- Distributed by: UFA
- Release date: 13 February 1920
- Country: Germany
- Languages: Silent; German intertitles

Hundemamachen (The Little Dog Mom) is a 1920 German silent comedy film directed by Rudolf Biebrach and starring Ossi Oswalda, Emil Biron and Ferry Sikla.

The film's sets were designed by the art director Jack Winter.

== Cast ==
- Ossi Oswalda as Ossi
- Emil Biron as Karl-Maria
- Ferry Sikla as Mathias Brockmüller
- Rudolf Biebrach as Kupferberg
- Paula Erberty as Ossis Mutter
- Friedrich Degner as Gerichtsvollzieher

== Bibliography ==
- Bock, Hans-Michael & Bergfelder, Tim. The Concise CineGraph. Encyclopedia of German Cinema. Berghahn Books, 2009.
