= I Don't Want to Be a Man =

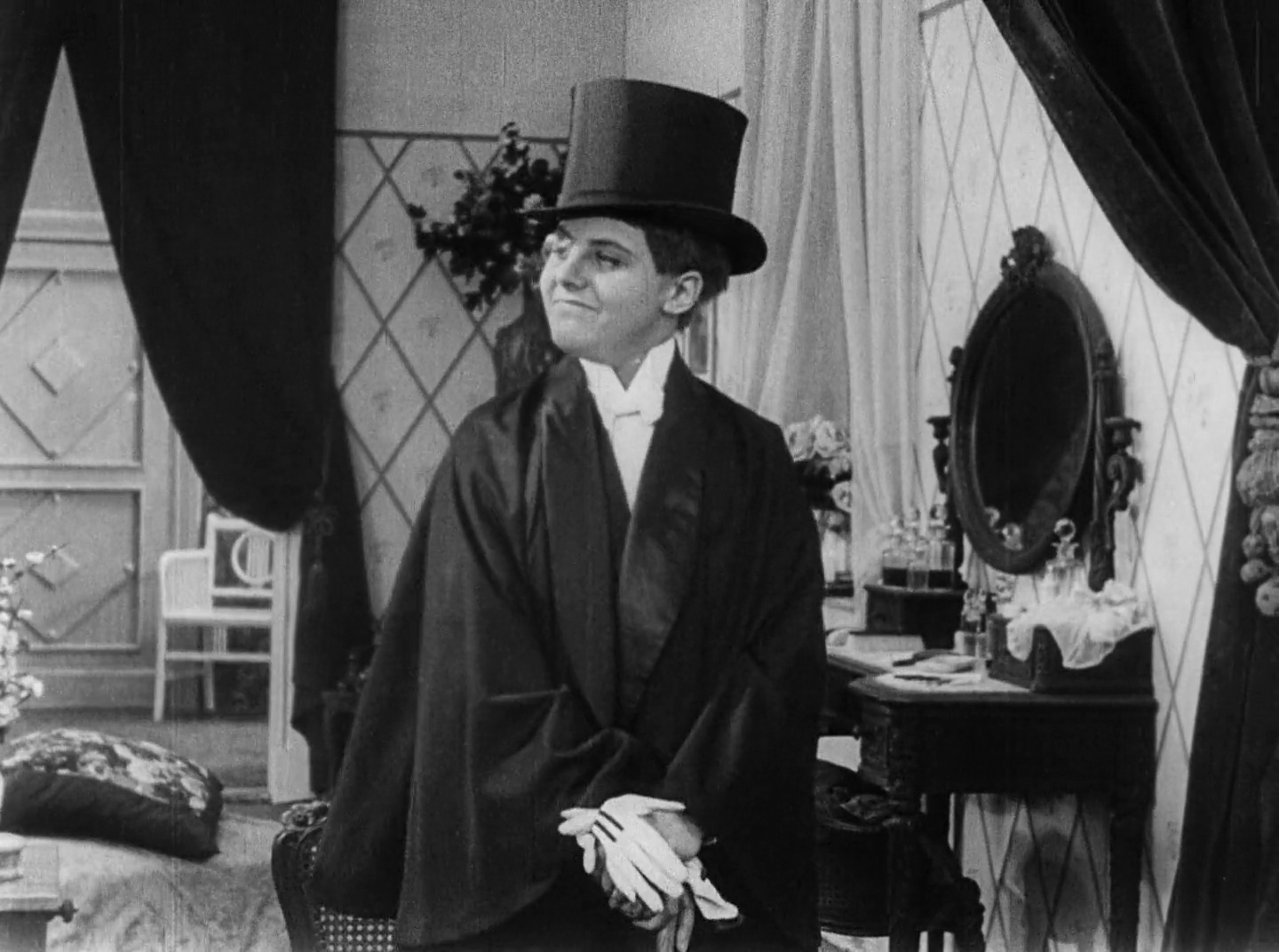
- Ossi Oswalda dressed as a man
- German: Ich möchte kein Mann sein
- Directed by: Ernst Lubitsch
- Written by: Hanns Kräly; Ernst Lubitsch
- Produced by: Paul Davidson
- Cinematography: Theodor Sparkuhl
- Production company: PAGU
- Distributed by: UFA
- Release date: 1 October 1918
- Running time: 41 min (20 frame/s)
- Country: Germany

I Don't Want to Be a Man (German: Ich möchte kein Mann sein) is a 1918 German film directed by Ernst Lubitsch. The film stars Ossi Oswalda, Curt Goetz, Ferry Sikla, Margarete Kupfer and Victor Janson.

The film is an early example of cross-dressing in a German film. It was shot at the Tempelhof Studios in Berlin.

== Plot ==
I Don't Want to Be a Man

High-spirited young Ossi Oswalda is the bane of her uncle and governess' existence. She insists on playing poker and smoking and talking with strange men on the street. When her uncle leaves to take up a new job, she looks forward to enjoying new freedom. Her hopes are dashed when her new guardian Dr. Kersten proves to be strict and unyielding.

Frustrated with her cloistered life, Ossi sneaks out on the town dressed as a young man. She finds that being a man has its own disadvantages when she discovers she is not given the same gentle treatment when she is masquerading as a male. She decides to attend a lavish ball in her new disguise.

Soon, Dr. Kersten appears at the ball trying to woo a young lady, and Ossi vengefully tries to steal her away from her hated guardian. Eventually, another man attracts the woman's attention, and the disguised Ossi and the doctor reconcile. The two proceed to bond over cigars and champagne.

After the ball is over, the pair drunkenly stumble home, exchanging inebriated kisses. After they pass out in a hired cab, the driver mistakenly leaves Ossi at the doctor's house and drops off the doctor at Ossi's home. Upon waking up in strange house, Ossi becomes alarmed and runs home where the doctor has woken up and is trying to sneak out of the house undetected.

Still in disguise, she pretends she is visiting her cousin Ossi, and the doctor begs her not to tell his ward about their "adventure". Ossi agrees and goes upstairs where she begins to undress. The doctor comes to wake her and is astonished to see Ossi wearing a man's suit. The tables are turned when Ossi scolds him for his behavior. Giving in to the attraction he feels for her, the doctor kisses her.

== Cast ==
- Ossi Oswalda as Ossi
- Curt Goetz as Dr. Kersten
- Ferry Sikla as Counsellor Brockmüller
- Margarete Kupfer as the governess
- Victor Janson as the band leader at the Mäuse-Palast

== Release ==
=== Home media ===
The film was released in the US by Kino Lorber as part of the boxed set Lubitsch in Berlin in 2006 with English intertitles. It was released in the UK by Eureka's Masters of Cinema series as part of the boxed set Lubitsch in Berlin: Fairy-Tales, Melodramas, and Sex Comedies in 2010 with German intertitles and English subtitles.

== Analysis and reception ==
=== Analysis ===
Film academic Valerie Weinstein argues that the film "plays with the possibility of gender confusion only to ultimately reinforce gender difference and heteronormativity." American film historian Joseph McBride said Lubitsch "was ahead of his time with depictions of sexually liberated themes; toying with gender roles in I Don't Want to Be a Man." Author Andrew Grossman wrote that while the film "manages to raise issues of queer desire, its formulaic plot eventually demands a safe return to heterosexuality."

=== Reception ===
British film critic David Shipman wrote the film was "a vehicle for Ossi Oswalda; but it was a backward step for Lubitsch, as the film had actually been made two years earlier." American film critic Scott Eyman opined that "Lubitsch's direction plays all the gender confusion for merry farce, although he would seem to have missed a few laughs by not having Kersten show more confusion over his slightly lingering kisses with what he believes to be a young man; still, the film is one of his most notable early achievements."

Author Jenni Olson said "comic in tone, the film explores the privileges and problems of gender and features some charming twists of homoerotic and lesbian-erotic humor." Film critic Erin Blackwell wrote this "is an adorable German silent; the film's enduring charm owes everything to the unself-conscious gusto with which Ossi Oswalda attacks her foray into male drag; the film finishes with Ossi’s intertitled declaration that she doesn’t want to be a man, since that would preclude making love with her guardian."

Guy Lodge noted in The Observer that it is a "raucous, stereotype-challenging cross-dressing comedy; a sprightly examination of an adventurous young woman posing as a man for a day; precociously challenging social and sexual status-quo politics that don't seem all that alien today, it's a revitalised artefact that functions just as well as a saucy romp." Film critic Kevin Thomas commented the film is a "knockabout comedy that has a timeless effervescence, as a hoydenish rich girl dons a white tie and tails to go out on the town once her guardian uncle has sailed for America."

== See also ==
- Cinema of Germany
- List of German films of 1919–1932
- List of LGBTQ-related films pre-1920
