= Sumurun =

1920 film directed by Ernst Lubitsch

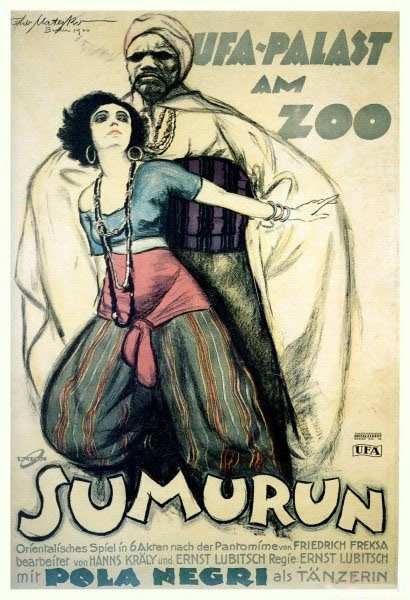
- Film poster
- Directed by: Ernst Lubitsch
- Written by: Hanns Kräly; Ernst Lubitsch
- Produced by: Paul Davidson
- Starring: see below
- Cinematography: Theodor Sparkuhl; Fritz Arno Wagner
- Distributed by: UFA; First National Pictures (U.S. release)
- Release date: 1 September 1920
- Running time: 103 minutes
- Country: Germany
- Languages: Silent (German intertitles); English intertitles (U.S. release)

Sumurun (1920) by Ernst Lubitsch

Sumurun (U.S. title: One Arabian Night) is a 1920 German silent film directed by Ernst Lubitsch based on a pantomime by Friedrich Freksa.

== Plot ==
A company of travelling performers arrives at a fictional oriental city. It includes the beautiful dancer Yannaia, the hunchback clown Yeggar who is lovesick for Yannaia and the Old Lady who loves Yeggar. The slave trader Achmed wants to sell Yannaia to the Sheik for his harem. At the Palace, the Sheik finds out that his favourite, Sumurun, is in love with Nur-Al Din, the handsome clothes merchant. He wants to condemn her to death but his son obtains her pardon. After seeing Yannaia dancing, the Sheik is keen to buy her. Yeggar is desperate and takes a magic pill which makes him look dead. His body is hidden in a chest. The women from the harem come to Nur-Al Din's shop and hide him in a chest so that he can be brought into the Palace. The chest containing Yeggar's body is also brought to the Palace and the Old Lady manages to revive him. The Sheik finds Yannaia having sex with his son and kills both of them. He then finds Sumurun having sex with Nur-Al Din and wants to kill them but he is stabbed in the back by Yeggar.

== Cast ==
- Paul Wegener as the Old Sheikh
- Carl Clewing as the Young Sheikh
- Jenny Hasselquist as Sumurun
- Aud Egede-Nissen as Haidee, a Servant
- Harry Liedtke as Nur-Al Din, the Cloth Merchant
- Paul Graetz as Puffti, a Servant
- Max Kronert as Muffti, a Servant
- Ernst Lubitsch as Yeggar, the Hunchback Beggar
- Margarete Kupfer as an Old Woman
- Pola Negri as Yannaia, a Dancer
- Paul Biensfeldt as Achmed, the Slave Trader
- Jakob Tiedtke as Head Eunuch

== Production ==
The filming of Sumurun began at the Ufa-Union Berlin Tempelhof Studios on 13 March 1920. The monumental sets were realised by Kurt Richter and Ernő Metzner. The costumes were designed by Ali Hubert. This is the last film in which Ernst Lubitsch starred. Sumurun was classified by the Film Censor's Office as not suitable for minors. The première took place on 1 September 1920 in the Ufa-Palast am Zoo in Berlin.

== Reception ==
In Germany, Sumurun was highly praised by contemporary critics and was described as "a cinematic journey into a universe of emotions and passions of great intensity and utter perfection, with a remarkable Ernst Lubitsch in one of the main roles."

In America, The New York Times wrote that One Arabian Night (the title under which Sumurun was released) gave added evidence that Ernst Lubitsch "is the superior of most directors anywhere, and that Pola Negri, a Polish-German actress, is one of the few real players of the screen who can make a character live and be something other than an actress playing a part." It concluded that, despite some shortcomings, it remained one of the year's best pictures.

== DVD releases ==
The film was released on DVD in the U.S. by Kino Lorber as part of the box set "Lubitsch in Berlin" in 2007 with English intertitles. It was also released in the UK by Eureka's Masters of Cinema series as part of the box set "Lubitsch in Berlin: Fairy-Tales, Melodramas, and Sex Comedies" in 2010 with German intertitles and English subtitles. It features a score by Javier Pérez de Azpeitia, and the restored film is tinted like the original.
