= The Sins of the Mother =

1921 film

- German: Die Sünden der Mutter
- Directed by: Georg Jacoby
- Produced by: Paul Davidson
- Starring: Carl Auen; Käthe Dorsch
- Cinematography: Theodor Sparkuhl
- Production company: PAGU
- Distributed by: UFA
- Release date: 8 December 1921
- Running time: 56 minutes
- Country: Germany
- Languages: Silent; German intertitles

The Sins of the Mother (German: Die Sünden der Mutter) is a 1921 German silent drama film directed by Georg Jacoby and starring Carl Auen and Käthe Dorsch.

The film's sets were designed by the art director Kurt Richter.

== Cast ==
- Curt Ehrle as Fabrikbesitzer Windolf Harrison
- Toni Zimmerer as Prokurist Charles Barker
- Grete Sellin as Dessen Frau Anni
- Käthe Dorsch as Louisa, beider Tochter
- Carl Auen as Ronald, beider Sohn
- Hanna Ralph as Harriet Kellogg, Schauspielerin
- Erika Glässner as Margit, ihre Tochter
- Paul Otto as John Vaugham
- Harry Liedtke as William Jeffries
- Hermann Thimig as Fred Hastings, sein Freund
