= Kurt Richter (art director) =

- Born: 1885; Krems an der Donau, Austro-Hungarian Empire
- Died: 1960 (aged 74–75); Salzburg, Austria
- Occupation: Art director
- Years active: 1916-1929 (film)

Kurt Richter (1885–1960) was an Austrian art director of the silent era. He designed the sets for more than a hundred films during his career, including a number made by the leading German company UFA where he frequently collaborated with director Ernst Lubitsch.

== Selected filmography ==
=== 1910s ===
- The White Terror (1917)
- Lulu (1917)
- The Merry Jail (1917)
- The Ballet Girl (1918)
- The Toboggan Cavalier (1918)
- Struggling Souls (1918)
- I Don't Want to Be a Man (1918)
- The Rosentopf Case (1918)
- The Lady, the Devil and the Model (1918)
- The Seeds of Life (1918)
- The Teahouse of the Ten Lotus Flowers (1919)
- The Dagger of Malaya (1919)
- The Merry Husband (1919)
- A Drive into the Blue (1919)
- Madame Dubarry (1919)
- The Oyster Princess (1919)
- The Howling Wolf (1919)
- The Panther Bride (1919)
- The Galley Slave (1919)
- The Woman at the Crossroads (1919)
- Countess Doddy (1919)
- The Daughter of Mehemed (1919)
- The Man of Action (1919)

=== 1920s ===
- Indian Revenge (1920)
- Sumurun (1920)
- Mascotte (1920)
- Anna Boleyn (1920)
- The Lady in Black (1920)
- The Marquise of Armiani (1920)
- Rebel Liesel (1920)
- Love at the Wheel (1921)
- The Sins of the Mother (1921)
- The Lost Shadow (1921)
- The Sacrifice of Ellen Larsen (1921)
- The Secret of the Mummy (1921)
- Peter Voss, Thief of Millions (1921)
- The Bull of Olivera (1921)
- Monna Vanna (1922)
- Maciste and the Javanese (1922)
- The Girl with the Mask (1922)
- A Night's Adventure (1923)
- All for Money (1923)
- Count Cohn (1923)
- The House by the Sea (1924)
- The Fake Emir (1924)
- The Creature (1924)
- The Woman with That Certain Something (1925)
- Love and Trumpets (1925)
- A Woman for 24 Hours (1925)
- The Love Trap (1925)
- Rags and Silk (1925)
- Adventure on the Night Express (1925)
- The Girl on the Road (1925)
- The Marriage Swindler (1925)
- The Black Pierrot (1926)
- Princess Trulala (1926)
- I Stand in the Dark Midnight (1927)
- Marie's Soldier (1927)
- A Day of Roses in August (1927)
- Circus Beely (1927)
- The Awakening of Woman (1927)
- The Ways of Love Are Strange (1927)
- Serenissimus and the Last Virgin (1928)
- Honeymoon (1928)
- The Woman from Till 12 (1928)
- He Goes Right, She Goes Left! (1928)
- It Attracted Three Fellows (1928)
- Polish Economy (1928)
- In Werder the Trees are in Bloom (1928)
- Dive (1929)
- What a Woman Dreams of in Springtime (1929)

== Bibliography ==
- Hake, Sabine. Passions and Deceptions: The Early Films of Ernst Lubitsch. Princeton University Press, 1992.
