= When Four Do the Same =

1917 film directed by Ernst Lubitsch

- Directed by: Ernst Lubitsch
- Written by: Erich Schönfelder; Ernst Lubitsch
- Produced by: Paul Davidson
- Starring: Ossi Oswalda; Emil Jannings; Margarete Kupfer; Fritz Schulz
- Production company: PAGU
- Release date: 16 November 1917
- Running time: 4 reels
- Country: Germany
- Languages: Silent; German intertitles

When Four Do the Same (German: Wenn vier dasselbe tun) is a 1917 German silent comedy drama film directed by Ernst Lubitsch and starring Ossi Oswalda, Emil Jannings and Margarete Kupfer. Lubitsch himself plays a book shop employee who falls in love with Jannings' character's daughter. The film was a key transitional work in Lubitsch's career, as he began to produce films with greater depth than his early light comedies.

The film was shot at the Tempelhof Studios in Berlin. It premièred in Berlin on 16 November 1917 at the Union-Theatre am Nollendorfplatz and at the UT Kufürstendamm (Filmbühne Wien).

== Cast ==
- Emil Jannings as Segetoff
- Ossi Oswalda as Segetoffs Tochter
- Margarete Kupfer as Frau Lange, Buchhändlerin
- Fritz Schulz as Tobias Schmalzstich, Lehrling
- Victor Janson as Tanzlehrer
- Ernst Lubitsch

== Bibliography ==
- Eyman, Scott. Ernst Lubitsch: Laughter in Paradise. Johns Hopkins University Press, 2000.
