= The Little Variety Star =

1926 film

- Directed by: Hanns Schwarz
- Written by: Alfred Moller (play); Wilhelm Thiele
- Produced by: Paul Davidson
- Starring: Ossi Oswalda; Georg Alexander; Max Hansen
- Cinematography: Curt Courant
- Production company: Davidson-Film
- Distributed by: UFA
- Release date: 3 September 1926
- Country: Germany
- Languages: Silent; German intertitles

The Little Variety Star (German: Die Kleine vom Varieté) is a 1926 German silent comedy film directed by Hanns Schwarz and starring Ossi Oswalda, Georg Alexander and Max Hansen. The film's sets were designed by Hans Jacoby.

== Plot ==
Peter becomes enamored with a woman, who is mistaken for a young man while performing on stage. This confusion occurs in front of Peter's wealthy uncle, who has already arranged a marriage for his nephew. The ensuing complications are eventually resolved, leading to positive outcomes for everyone involved.

== Cast ==
- Ossi Oswalda as Rositta, die Kleine vom Varieté
- Georg Alexander as Dr. Peter Kretschmar
- Max Hansen as Fred
- Vivian Gibson as Josette
- Ferry Sikla as Onkel

== Bibliography ==
- Thomas Elsaesser & Michael Wedel. The BFI companion to German cinema. British Film Institute, 1999.
