= John Ford bibliography =

A list of books and essays about John Ford:

- Bogdanovich, Peter (1970). John Ford. University of California Press.
- Eyman, Scott (1999). Print the Legend: The Life and Times of John Ford. New York: Simon & Schuster. ISBN 978-0-684-81161-1.
- Gallagher, Tag (1988). John Ford: The Man and His Films. University of California Press. ISBN 978-0-520-06334-1.
- McBride, Joseph; Wilmington, Michael (1975). John Ford. Da Capo Press. ISBN 978-0-306-70750-6.
- Neill, Michael (1988). John Ford: Critical Re-visions. Cambridge University Press. ISBN 978-0-521-33142-5.
- Sargeaunt, Margaret Joan (1966). John Ford. Russell & Russell.
