= Als ich tot war =

1916 film by Ernst Lubitsch

- Directed by: Ernst Lubitsch
- Written by: Ernst Lubitsch
- Produced by: Paul Davidson
- Starring: Ernst Lubitsch
- Production company: PAGU
- Release date: 25 February 1916
- Running time: 36 minutes
- Country: Germany
- Language: Silent film

Als ich tot war (English: When I Was Dead) is a 1916 German silent comedy film in three acts written and directed by and starring Ernst Lubitsch. The film premiered under the censored title Wo ist mein Schatz? (English: Where Is My Treasure?).

== Plot ==
Despite the protests of his wife Louise and his unpleasant mother-in-law, Ernst spends the evening at a chess club. Revenge follows when he returns home at night: his mother-in-law has chained the door, and Ernst is therefore not allowed into the apartment. He undresses in the stairwell, where he spends the night, but his mother-in-law steals his clothes. The next day, a resident flees at the sight of him – the clothes he had covered himself with the night before are gone. Back at the apartment, Ernst is chased away by his mother-in-law. Since his wife also informs him in writing that one of them must leave the apartment forever, he decides to fake suicide: in a letter to his wife, he writes that he will kill himself, and leaves the apartment. He then enjoys his newfound freedom, but soon grows weary of it.

Louise and his mother-in-law, believing Ernst is dead, place an ad for a servant, and Ernst, who reads the ad in the newspaper at his club, applies for the position. Together, they promptly hire Ernst in disguise. The mother-in-law applies to a marital agency to find her daughter a new husband. Ernst uses all sorts of tricks to scare Louise's new suitor out of the house. Finally, he reveals himself to the grieving Louise, after he has chased away his mother-in-law, and a happy ending ensues.

== Cast ==
- Ernst Lubitsch – Ernst, the husband
- Louise Schenrich – Louise, the wife
- Helene Voss (as Lanchen Voss) – the mother-in-law
- Julius Falkenstein – Louise's suitor

== Production ==
Als ich tot war was criticised by the censors in December 1915: it was banned from youth screenings and had to be renamed to the innocuous title Wo ist mein Schatz? (English: Where Is My Treasure?) under which it premiered on 25 February 1916.

== Critical reception ==
Critics classified Als ich tot war as a farce and described the film as a "splendid comedy": "Lubitsch plays this role in such a droll way that you practically can't stop laughing."

In 1947 Lubitsch viewed his part as his first attempt at a serious leading role which, as he recalls, was a failure with the audience:

Like every comedian, I longed to play a straight leading man, a sort of a bon vivant role. So together with my collaborators, I wrote a screenplay, called Als ich tot war. This picture was a complete failure as the audiences were unwilling to accept me as a straight leading man.

— Ernst Lubitsch, 1947

== Survival status ==
The film was considered lost until the 1990s. In 1978, Robert L. Carringer and Barry Sabath suspected that Als ich tot war was identical to the 1915 silent film Wie ich ermordet wurde (English: How I Was Murdered) by Louis Ralph, but by the 1980s this was no longer considered to be true, partly due to various censorship dates.

At the beginning of the 1990s, an almost complete copy of Als ich tot war was finally found in the Slovenska Kinoteka (Slovenian Cinematheque) in Ljubljana, Slovenia, and was shown for the first time in 1995 at the silent film festival in Pordenone. A portion of the first act is missing, as is the ending with the reconciliation between Ernst and Louise. This tinted version of the film, which is now being shown again under the title "Als ich tot war", is Lubitsch's earliest surviving film.

== Home media ==
In 2014, the film was released on dual format Blu-ray and DVD as part of the Masters of Cinema series, accompanying Madame Dubarry (1919).
