= The Woman at the Crossroads (1919 film) =

- Directed by: Georg Jacoby
- Written by: Paul Otto
- Produced by: Paul Davidson
- Starring: Pola Negri; Harry Liedtke; Victor Janson
- Cinematography: Theodor Sparkuhl
- Production company: PAGU
- Distributed by: UFA
- Release date: June 1919
- Country: Germany
- Languages: Silent; German intertitles

The Woman at the Crossroads (German: Kreuzigt sie!) is a 1919 German silent film directed by Georg Jacoby and starring Pola Negri, Harry Liedtke and Albert Patry. It is now believed to be a lost film.

The film's sets were designed by the art director Kurt Richter.

== Cast ==
- Pola Negri as Maria
- Harry Liedtke as Graf Wengerade
- Paul Hansen as Pieter van der Straaten
- Magnus Stifter as Pablo Fuentes
- Albert Patry as Staatsrat Alexander
- Wilhelm Diegelmann
- Lotte George
- Victor Janson
- Hermann Picha

== Bibliography ==
- Mariusz Kotowski. Pola Negri: Hollywood's First Femme Fatale. University Press of Kentucky, 2014.
