= The Flyer from Goerz =

- Directed by: Georg Jacoby
- Written by: Hans Brennert; Georg Jacoby
- Produced by: Paul Davidson
- Starring: Ellen Richter; Harry Liedtke; Johannes Müller
- Cinematography: Theodor Sparkuhl
- Production company: PAGU
- Distributed by: UFA
- Release date: September 1918
- Country: Germany
- Languages: Silent; German intertitles

The Flyer from Goerz (German: Der Flieger von Goerz) is a 1918 German silent war film directed as well as co-written by Georg Jacoby and starring Ellen Richter, Harry Liedtke and Johannes Müller.

== Cast ==
- Ellen Richter as Giunetta
- Harry Liedtke as Fliegeroberleutnant
- Johannes Müller as Mario

== Bibliography ==
- Hans-Michael Bock & Michael Töteberg. Das Ufa-Buch. Zweitausendeins, 1992.
