= The Oyster Princess =

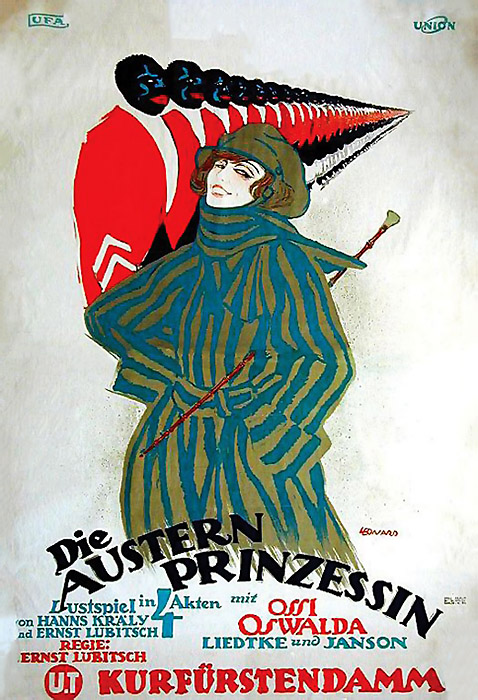
- Directed by: Ernst Lubitsch
- Written by: Hanns Kräly; Ernst Lubitsch
- Produced by: Paul Davidson
- Starring: Ossi Oswalda; Victor Janson; Harry Liedtke; Julius Falkenstein
- Cinematography: Theodor Sparkuhl
- Music by: Aljoscha Zimmermann (DVD release)
- Production company: PAGU
- Distributed by: UFA
- Release date: 26 June 1919 (Germany)
- Running time: 60 minutes
- Country: Germany
- Language: Silent film

The Oyster Princess (German: Die Austernprinzessin) is a 1919 German silent comedy film directed by Ernst Lubitsch and starring Victor Janson, Ossi Oswalda and Harry Liedtke. It is a grotesque comedy in four acts about an American millionaire's spoiled daughter's marriage that does not go as planned. It was shot at the Tempelhof Studios in Berlin. The film's sets were designed by the art director Kurt Richter, a frequent collaborator of Lubitsch.

== Plot ==
Full movie

Mr. Quaker, the American "Oyster King", resides with his unmarried daughter, Ossi, in a mansion attended by a large staff of servants. After hearing about a rival debutante's recent marriage to a count, Ossi throws a tantrum. Also competitive, Mr. Quaker promises his daughter that he will find a suitable prince for her to marry. They engage a matchmaker, who locates Prince Nucki, an indebted down-on-his-luck royal, who hides his wealth from his poorer friends and his poverty from his wealthier associates. Hoping that the match would improve his financial situation, Prince Nucki agrees to send his friend Josef to meet Ossi on his behalf.

When Josef arrives at the Quakers' residence, he accidentally provides Prince Nucki's calling card as his own. Ossi is not impressed with the visitor, but eager to be married and believing Josef to be the prince, she rushes them to a priest, where Ossi is immediately married to Josef, under Prince Nucki's name. A rushed but well-attended wedding reception follows the quick marriage. Both Mr. Quaker and Ossi are not fond of her new husband, but Josef thoroughly enjoys the rousing party, which features a "Foxtrot epidemic" that causes the whole house, including staff, to break into dance.

Meanwhile, after a night of carousing with friends, the real Prince Nucki stumbles into a carriage that takes him to a meeting of the Multi-Millionaires' Daughters Association Against Dipsomania, of which Ossi is a member. There, the two meet and are immediately smitten. Not yet knowing each other's identities both are distraught, she believing herself to be recently married and he believing himself to be betrothed. Josef finds them together and, laughing, asks, "Do you know that you two are married to each other?" The happy couple celebrate with a second, much smaller reception, and in the end, Ossi, Prince Nucki, and Mr. Quaker are all pleased with the match.

== Cast ==
- Victor Janson as Mr. Quaker, the American Oyster King
- Ossi Oswalda as Ossi, his daughter
- Harry Liedtke as Prince Nucki
- Julius Falkenstein as Josef, Nucki's friend
- Max Kronert as Seligson, the matchmaker
- Curt Bois as the bandmaster

== Home media releases ==
In 2007, the film was released on DVD by Kino Lorber as part of the box set "Lubitsch in Berlin" with English intertitles. This release includes a soundtrack composed by Aljoscha Zimmermann.

In 2010, it was released on DVD by Eureka Entertainment in their Masters of Cinema series, as part of the box set "Lubitsch in Berlin: Fairy-Tales, Melodramas, and Sex Comedies" with German intertitles and English subtitles. In 2017, Eureka re-released this box set on Blu-ray with the original German intertitles and English subtitles.
