= The Merry Husband =

1919 film by Léo Lasko

- Directed by: Léo Lasko
- Written by: Ernst Lubitsch; Richard Wilde
- Produced by: Paul Davidson
- Starring: Victor Janson; Irmgard Bern; Marga Köhler
- Cinematography: Theodor Sparkuhl
- Production company: PAGU
- Distributed by: UFA
- Release date: 22 August 1919
- Country: Germany
- Languages: Silent; German intertitles

The Merry Husband (German: Der lustige Ehemann) is a 1919 German silent comedy film directed by Léo Lasko and starring Victor Janson, Irmgard Bern and Marga Köhler.

The film's sets were designed by the art director Kurt Richter.

== Cast ==
- Victor Janson as Dr. Helfer / Randolfi
- Irmgard Bern
- Marga Köhler
- Heddy Jendry
- Wally Koch

== Bibliography ==
- Monaco, James. The Encyclopedia of Film. Perigee Books, 1991.
