= Carmen (1918 film) =

1918 film directed by Ernst Lubitsch

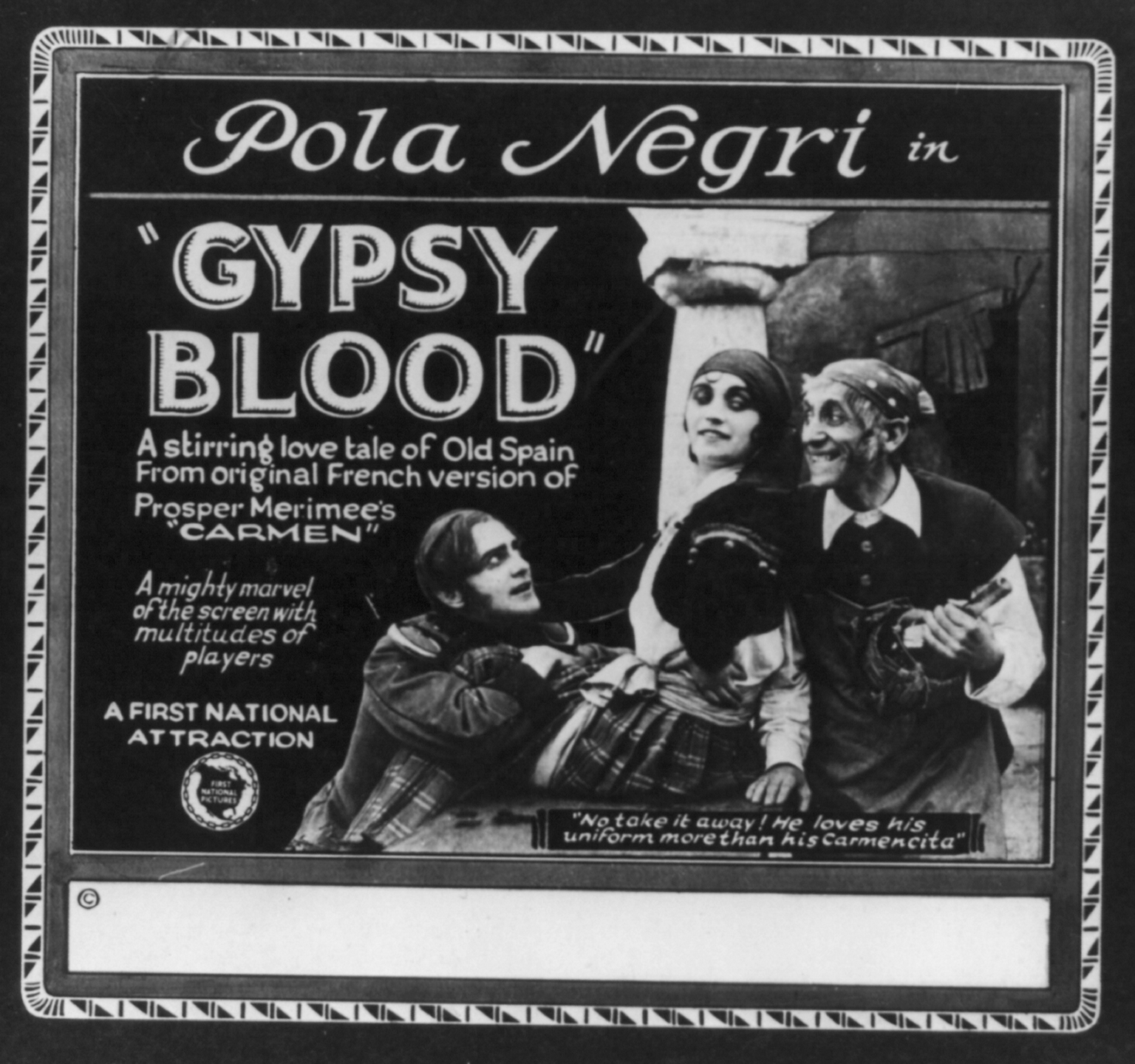
- Directed by: Ernst Lubitsch
- Written by: Grete Diercks; Norbert Falk; Hanns Kräly; Myron M. Stearns (English version)
- Based on: Carmen by Prosper Mérimée
- Produced by: Paul Davidson
- Starring: Pola Negri; Harry Liedtke; Leopold von Ledebur; Wilhelm Diegelmann
- Cinematography: Alfred Hansen
- Production companies: PAGU; UFA
- Distributed by: UFA (Germany); First National Pictures (US)
- Release date: 17 December 1918
- Running time: 80 minutes (4,800 s)
- Country: Germany
- Languages: Silent; German intertitles

Carmen is a 1918 German silent drama film directed by Ernst Lubitsch and starring Pola Negri, Harry Liedtke, and Leopold von Ledebur. It was based on the novella Carmen by Prosper Mérimée. Like Bizet's opera Carmen, this film only adapts the third part of Mérimée's novella and transforms the character of Don José at the beginning of the story from bandit on the run to honest man in love with his childhood sweetheart. The film was released with English intertitles in the United States in 1921 under the alternative title Gypsy Blood.

== Plot ==
Carmen (1918)

Don José was a Dragoon Sergeant in Sevilla who fell madly in love with Carmen, a beautiful gypsy. For her, he killed an officer and gave up his fiancée and his career in the army, and became a smuggler. But Carmen's love did not last. She left him and went to Gibraltar where she fell in love with the famous bullfighter Escamillo. Back in Sevilla, Carmen rode triumphantly in Escamillo's carriage on his way to a bullfight. At the end of the bullfight, José confronted Carmen and when she told him that she no longer loved him, stabbed her to death.

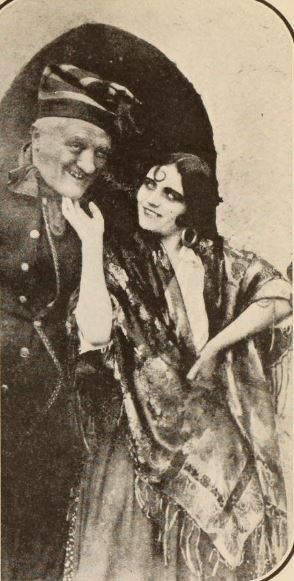
Carmen (1918), Pola Negri

== Cast ==
- Pola Negri as Carmen
- Harry Liedtke as Don José Navarro
- Leopold von Ledebur as Garcia
- Grete Diercks as Dolores
- Wilhelm Diegelmann as Gefängniswärter / Prison Guard
- Heinrich Peer as Englischer Offizier
- Margarete Kupfer as Carmens Wirtin, Landlady
- Sophie Pagay as Don Josés Mutter
- Paul Conradi as Don Cairo
- Max Kronert as Remendado
- Magnus Stifter as Lieutenant Escamillo
- Paul Biensfeldt as Soldat
- Victor Janson
- Albert Venohr

== Bibliography ==
- Eyman, Scott (2000) [1993]. Ernst Lubitsch: Laughter in Paradise. Baltimore: Johns Hopkins University Press. ISBN 978-0-8018-6558-9.
