= Union Theatre =

Union Theatre may refer to:

- Union Theatre, London, England
- Union Theatre, Melbourne, at the University of Melbourne
- Union Theatre (Peterborough), Ontario, Canada, in existence 1989–1996

== See also ==
- Union Square Theatre, New York
- Union-Theater, Berlin, Germany
- Union Theatres
