= Countess Doddy =

1919 film

- German: Komtesse Doddy
- Directed by: Georg Jacoby
- Written by: Georg Jacoby; Hanns Kräly
- Produced by: Paul Davidson
- Starring: Pola Negri; Harry Liedtke; Victor Janson
- Cinematography: Theodor Sparkuhl
- Production company: PAGU
- Distributed by: UFA
- Release date: November 1919
- Country: Germany
- Languages: Silent; German intertitles

Countess Doddy (German: Komtesse Doddy) is a 1919 German silent comedy film directed by Georg Jacoby and starring Pola Negri, Harry Liedtke and Victor Janson.

The film's sets were designed by the art director Kurt Richter.

== Cast ==
In alphabetical order

- Georg Baselt
- Poldi Deutsch
- Victor Janson
- Heddy Jendry
- Max Kronert
- Harry Liedtke
- Paul Morgan
- Pola Negri
- Hans Adalbert Schlettow
- Lissy Schwarz
- Hermann Thimig
- Emmy Wyda
