= The Marquise of Armiani =

1920 film

- Directed by: Alfred Halm
- Written by: Alfred Halm
- Produced by: Paul Davidson
- Starring: Pola Negri; Ernst Dernburg; Elsa Wagner
- Cinematography: Theodor Sparkuhl
- Production company: PAGU
- Distributed by: UFA
- Release date: 13 February 1920
- Country: Germany
- Languages: Silent; German intertitles

The Marquise of Armiani (German: Die Marchesa d'Armiani) is a 1920 German silent film directed by Alfred Halm and starring Pola Negri, Ernst Dernburg, and Elsa Wagner.

The film's sets were designed by the art director Kurt Richter.

== Cast ==
- Pola Negri as Marchesa Assunta
- Ernst Dernburg as Polizeichef
- Elsa Wagner as Assuntas Mutter
- Max Pohl
- Fritz Schulz

== Bibliography ==
- Mariusz Kotowski. Pola Negri: Hollywood's First Femme Fatale. University Press of Kentucky, 2014.
