= The Story of a Maid =

1921 film

- Directed by: Reinhold Schünzel
- Written by: Robert Liebmann
- Produced by: Reinhold Schünzel
- Starring: Liane Haid; Otto Tressler; Erika Glässner
- Cinematography: Theodor Sparkuhl
- Production company: Micco Film
- Distributed by: National Film
- Release date: 31 August 1921
- Countries: Austria; Germany
- Languages: Silent; German intertitles

The Story of a Maid (German: Der Roman eines Dienstmädchens) is a 1921 Austrian-German silent drama film directed by Reinhold Schünzel and starring Liane Haid, Otto Tressler, and Erika Glässner. It premiered at the Marmorhaus in Berlin.

The film's sets were designed by the art directors Karl Machus and Oscar Friedrich Werndorff. It was shot in Vienna.

== Cast ==
- Liane Haid
- Reinhold Schünzel
- Erika Glässner
- Mizzi Schütz as Marie
- Arnold Korff
- Otto Tressler as Leopold
- Olga Engl as Charlotte
- Loo Hardy as Effi
- Ernst Behmer as Iwan
- Carl Geppert as Ernst von Olten
- Margarete Kupfer as Olga Ziesemack
- Leonhard Haskel as August Kille
- Charles Puffy as Mr. Brown
- Trude Hesterberg as Lia de Pau
- Emil Biron as Bildhauer
- Karl Platen as Beamter
- Eugen Rex as Herr aus der Provinz
- Hilde Arndt
- Ernst Pröckl as Herbert

== Bibliography ==
- Parish, Robert. Film Actors Guide. Scarecrow Press, 1977.
