= The Housing Shortage =

1920 German film by Ernst Lubitsch

- Directed by: Ernst Lubitsch
- Written by: Hanns Kräly; Ernst Lubitsch
- Produced by: Paul Davidson
- Starring: Victor Janson; Marga Köhler; Ossi Oswalda
- Cinematography: Kurt Lande
- Production company: PAGU
- Distributed by: UFA
- Release date: 6 February 1920
- Country: Germany
- Languages: Silent; German intertitles

The Housing Shortage (German: Die Wohnungsnot) is a 1920 German silent short comedy film directed by Ernst Lubitsch and starring Victor Janson and Marga Köhler and Ossi Oswalda. It is now considered a lost film.
