= Countess Ironing-Maid =

1926 film directed by Constantin J. David

- Directed by: Constantin J. David
- Written by: Robert Reinert; Wilhelm Thiele
- Produced by: Lupu Pick
- Starring: Ossi Oswalda; Curt Bois; Robert Garrison
- Cinematography: Curt Courant
- Music by: Otto Stenzeel
- Production company: Rex-Film
- Distributed by: UFA
- Release date: 25 November 1926
- Country: Germany
- Languages: Silent; German intertitles

Countess Ironing-Maid (German: Gräfin Plättmamsell) is a 1926 German silent comedy film directed by Constantin J. David and starring Ossi Oswalda, Curt Bois, and Robert Garrison.

The film's sets were designed by the art director Rudi Feld.

== Cast ==
- Ossi Oswalda
- Curt Bois
- Robert Garrison
- Lydia Potechina
- Julius Falkenstein
- Hanne Brinkmann
- Hermann Böttcher
- Hugo Fischer-Köppe
- Tamara Geva
- Margarete Kupfer
- Toni Tetzlaff

== Bibliography ==
- Bock, Hans-Michael & Bergfelder, Tim. The Concise CineGraph. Encyclopedia of German Cinema. Berghahn Books, 2009.
