= Julius Aussenberg =

- Born: 14 March 1887; Vienna, Austria-Hungary
- Died: 22 August 1955 (aged 68); Vienna, Austria
- Occupation(s): Film producer, finance manager, film production manager
- Spouses: Hilda Fuehrling (divorced): Zdenka Fantlová
- Partner: Ossi Oswalda
- Children: 4

Julius Außenberg (14 March 1887 – 22 August 1955), also known as Julius Aussenberg, was an Austrian film producer, finance manager, and film production manager.

== Biography ==
Julius Außenberg was born into a Jewish family in Vienna, the son of Adolf Eisig Außenberg (1849–1910) and Bertha Außenberg (née Hutter, c. 1852–1925). He had eight siblings.

Aussenberg at first worked as an industrialist, but changed careers to the film industry. In 1924 he became the European representative of the Hollywood production company Fox. In 1926 Assenberg accompanied F. W. Murnau to Hollywood to shoot, where Murnau was directing the Fox Film Sunrise: A Song of Two Humans. Back in Germany the following year, he was responsible for producing Walter Ruttmann's famous Berlin documentary Berlin: Symphony of a Metropolis.

Aussenberg became Head Producer at Deutsche Lichtspiel-syndikat production company. At the same time, he worked on his own production company Atlantis-Film, and he was a partner in Joe May's May-Film A.G. In 1930 he took part in Alexander Korda's London-Film as its General Representative for Europe und Overseas. When Adolf Hitler assumed power in 1933, Julius Aussenberg had just planned the production of two films with Elisabeth Bergner which were never filmed. That same year, Aussenberg and his partner, actress Ossi Oswalda, fled from Nazi Germany and settled in Czechoslovakia, where he produced four films. In 1939 he again fled the Nazis to London.

Aussenberg's first wife was Hilda Fuehrling, with whom he had four children: Adolf (1914–1944), who became a painter and was murdered in the Holocaust; Elli (1918–2006); Erich; and Walter. They divorced, and he then married Zdenka Fantlová. Aussenberg's stepson was the director Thomas Fantl, and producer Jan Fantl is his step-grandson. Shortly before his death in 1955 Aussenberg returned to Vienna, where he's buried.

== Filmography ==
- Die Abenteuer eines Zehnmarkscheins (1926)
- Madame Wants No Children (1926)
- Der Sohn der Hagar (1926)
- Berlin: Symphony of a Metropolis (1927)
- Volha v plamenech (1934)
- Hudba srdcí (1934)
- Her Highness Dances the Waltz (1935)
- Naše jedenáctka (1936)

== Literature ==
- Kay Weniger: Es wird im Leben dir mehr genommen als gegeben …. Lexikon der aus Deutschland und Österreich emigrierten Filmschaffenden 1933 bis 1945. Eine Gesamtübersicht. S. 79, ACABUS Verlag, Hamburg 2011, ISBN 978-3-86282-049-8
