= Emil Birron =

German actor (1878–1952)

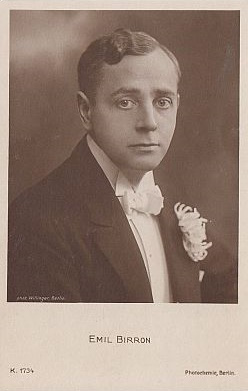
- Birron c. 1910
- Born: Emil Bleeke; 1 January 1878; Elberfeld, German Empire
- Died: 18 January 1952 (aged 74); Potsdam, East Germany
- Other names: Emil Biron; Emil Byron
- Occupation: Actor
- Years active: 1917–1935 (film)

Emil Birron (born Emil Bleeke; 1 January 1878 – 18 January 1952) was a German stage and film actor.

== Selected filmography ==
- Alkohol (1919)
- Vendetta (1919)
- Demon Blood (1920)
- Hundemamachen (1920)
- The Last Hour (1921)
- Playing with Fire (1921)
- The Story of a Maid (1921)
- The Weavers (1927)
- Roses from the South (1934)
- Make Me Happy (1935)

== Bibliography ==
- Jung, Uli & Schatzberg, Walter. Beyond Caligari: The Films of Robert Wiene. Berghahn Books, 1999.
