= Darling, Count the Cash =

1926 film

Darlings, Count the Cash
- German: Schatz, mach' Kasse
- Directed by: Felix Basch
- Written by: Felix Basch; Ladislaus Vajda
- Starring: Sig Arno; Ossi Oswalda; Lydia Potechina
- Cinematography: Franz Planer
- Production company: Ama-Film
- Distributed by: Ama-Film
- Release date: 25 November 1926
- Country: Germany
- Languages: Silent; German intertitles

Darling, Count the Cash (German: Schatz, mach' Kasse) is a 1926 German silent comedy film directed by Felix Basch and starring Sig Arno, Ossi Oswalda, and Lydia Potechina.

The film's sets were designed by the art director Robert Neppach.

== Cast ==
- Sig Arno as Cäsar Glück
- Ossi Oswalda as Ossi
- Lydia Potechina as Ossis Mutter
- Hans Albers as Theophil, der Geschäftsführer
- Gyula Szőreghy as Faktotum
- Karl Harbacher as Diener
- Gerhard Ritterband as Lehrling
- Paul Morgan as Konfektionsreisender
- Rosa Valetti as Heiratsvermittlerin
- Karl Victor Plagge as Tanzlehrer
- Hermann Picha as Kellner
- Lissy Arna as Boxerbraut
- Fritz Beckmann
- Erich Brandl
- Henry Bender
