= Meyer from Berlin =

- Directed by: Ernst Lubitsch
- Written by: Hanns Kräly; Erich Schönfelder
- Starring: Ernst Lubitsch; Ossi Oswalda; Ethel Orff; Heinz Landsmann
- Cinematography: Alfred Hansen; Theodor Sparkuhl
- Music by: Aljoscha Zimmermann
- Production company: PAGU
- Distributed by: UFA
- Release date: 17 January 1919
- Running time: 58 minutes
- Country: Germany
- Languages: Silent; German intertitles

Meyer from Berlin (German: Meyer aus Berlin) is a 1919 German silent comedy film directed by Ernst Lubitsch and starring Lubitsch, Ossi Oswalda and Ethel Orff. It was part of the Sally series of films featuring Lubitsch as a sharp young Berliner of Jewish heritage. It was Lubitsch's penultimate film as an actor, after 1920 he devoted himself entirely to screenwriting and directing.

== Plot ==
Meyer from Berlin

Sally Meyer, a young Berliner, persuades his doctor to convince his wife that he is ill, so that he is able to take a holiday in the Austrian Alps in order to pursue women. Meyer dresses up in what he considers Tyrolean attire. However, he mistakenly travels to the Bavarian Alps rather than Austria. Meyer becomes infatuated with Kitty, a young, attractive woman at the hotel where he is staying. His pursuit of her angers many of her other suitors who are also staying at the hotel. In order to impress Kitty, Meyer agrees rather reluctantly to climb Mount Watzmann. While they are approaching the summit, both Meyer's wife and Kitty's fiancé unexpectedly arrive from Berlin.

== Cast ==
- Ernst Lubitsch as Sally Meyer
- Ethel Orff as Paula, his wife
- Heinz Landsmann as Harry
- Trude Troll as Kitty, his bride
- Ossi Oswalda
- Erich Schönfelder

== Bibliography ==
- Eyman, Scott. Ernst Lubitsch: Laughter in Paradise. Johns Hopkins University Press, 2000.
- Prawer, S.S. Between Two Worlds: The Jewish Presence in German and Austrian Film, 1910-1933. Berghahn Books, 2005.
