= A Night of Horror =

1916 film directed by Richard Oswald

- Directed by: Richard Oswald; Arthur Robison
- Produced by: Lu Synd
- Starring: Werner Krauss
- Cinematography: Max Fassbender
- Release date: 1916
- Country: German Empire
- Language: Silent

A Night of Horror (German: Nächte des Grauens) is a 1916 silent German horror film directed by Richard Oswald, Arthur Robison and starring Werner Krauss. It is the earliest known feature-length film to portray vampires, with vampire-like people appearing in the film.

== Plot ==
Poor Maria Lotti, serving as a clerk in a ladies' clothing store, receives a message from a New York notary that her grandfather Joseph Lotti has died. The gang of thieves, the Brothers of Darkness, also received the same message with great detail and rushed to take action. The harassment began.

Grief-stricken, the disillusioned girl falls into poverty. A hard life full of excruciating experiences began. André meets Maria one day quite by chance at the Green Tavern. Meanwhile, Maria and Andre run away.

They had to endure many difficulties and dangers. The Brothers of Darkness gang was overrun, but they did not surrender, and after blowing up their castle, they perished. Maria and Andre took possession of the inheritance and were never separated again.

== Cast ==
In alphabetical order:

- Emil Jannings as Banker
- Laurence Köhler
- Werner Krauss as Artist's Husband
- Hans Mierendorff as Magistrate
- Ossi Oswalda
- Lupu Pick
- Lu Synd as Artist
