= Shoe Palace Pinkus =

1916 film directed by Ernst Lubitsch

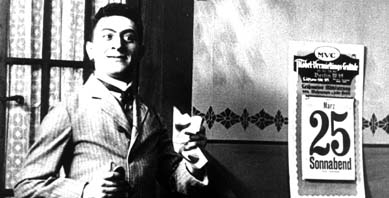
- Ernst Lubitsch
- Directed by: Ernst Lubitsch
- Written by: Hanns Kräly; Erich Schönfelder
- Starring: Ernst Lubitsch; Else Kentner; Guido Herzfeld; Ossi Oswalda
- Production company: PAGU
- Distributed by: Union Film
- Release date: March 1916
- Running time: 45 minutes
- Country: Germany
- Languages: Silent; German intertitles

Schuhpalast Pinkus (in German, no English subtitles)

Shoe Palace Pinkus (German: Schuhpalast Pinkus) is a 1916 German silent comedy film directed by Ernst Lubitsch and starring Lubitsch, Else Kentner and Guido Herzfeld. In English it is sometimes known by the alternative titles Shoe Salon Pinkus and The Shoe Palace. It was part of the Sally series of films featuring Lubitsch as a sharp young Berliner of Jewish heritage. After leaving school, a self-confident young man goes to work in a shoe shop. Soon after, he becomes a shoe tycoon.

It premièred on 9 June 1916 at the Union-Theater Nollendorfplatz, and at the U.-T. Kurfürstendamm (Filmbühne Wien), Berlin.

== Plot ==
Sally Pinkus has little interest in school. He would rather flirt with the family maid or fellow (female) students. His teacher catches him cheating on an exam and gets him expelled.

A few month later, Sally goes looking for work. He gets hired as an apprentice at a shoe store, where they do not care about his abysmal grades. The job has one special attraction for Sally, a pretty and receptive co-worker. However, he does little and is thrown out by the shopkeeper.

Undaunted, he submits a highly distorted employment application and is invited to a job interview at Meiersohn, another shoe shop. Mr. Meiersohn is unimpressed, but Sally talks his way into the job. He quickly makes himself agreeable to the women employees. After work, he accompanies one of them, but she is going to a rendezvous with another man. The next day, she tells the other women about Sally's blunder. Sally attends a pretty customer, but takes off her boot and tickles her foot. The irate customer leaves. Sally is reported to Meiersohn, who angrily tells him, "No more tickling!"

When attractive dancer Melitta Hervé enters the shop, Meiersohn attends to her himself, but she does not like any of the boots he shows her. Sally comes up with an idea; he changes the size written on the bottom of another pair to a smaller one. When Hervé sees the fake size, she buys them. He promises to deliver them personally. His boss is impressed. Meiersohn decides to make the delivery himself. When Sally finds out, he secretly replaces the boots with a men's pair. The sabotage works. Sally runs into the dejected Meiersohn leaving Hervé's house, and they fight over the right pair, until Sally asks how Meiersohn's wife is doing. Sally proves so charming that Hervé invites him to tea. She suggests he start his own business, then gives him a check for 30,000 marks. He is so overjoyed he grabs and kisses her. She is not offended.

Sally quits and launches Shoe Palace Pinkus. However, there are few customers. He distributes announcements of a showing of the latest models of shoes and boots at his store to audience members at Herve's dance performance. The show is a great success. When Hervé comes to receive a return on her investment, Sally proposes she marry him and keep the money in the family. She assents.

== Cast ==
- Ernst Lubitsch as Sally Pinkus
- Else Kentner as Melitta Hervé, dancer
- Guido Herzfeld as Mr. Meiersohn (spelled Meyersohn in a letter shown onscreen)
- Ossi Oswalda as Apprentice
- Hanns Kräly as Teacher
- Erich Schönfelder as Schuhmacher
- Fritz Rasp

== Reception ==
Joseph McBride describes the film in How Did Lubitsch Do It? as "more a series of raggedly filmed comic skits than a sustained story" but also considered it "the most Lubitschean of his early farces". He also points out the parallels between Pinkus's career and Lubitsch's own.

== Bibliography ==
- Eyman, Scott. Ernst Lubitsch: Laughter in Paradise. Johns Hopkins University Press, 2000.
- Prawer, S.S. Between Two Worlds: The Jewish Presence in German and Austrian Film, 1910-1933. Berghahn Books, 2005.
