= My Wife, the Movie Star =

- Directed by: Ernst Lubitsch
- Written by: Erich Schönfelder; Hanns Kräly; Ernst Lubitsch
- Produced by: Paul Davidson
- Starring: Ossi Oswalda; Paul Biensfeldt; Victor Janson; Max Kronert
- Cinematography: Theodor Sparkuhl
- Production company: PAGU
- Distributed by: Universum Film AG
- Release date: 24 January 1919
- Running time: 5 reels
- Country: Germany
- Languages: Silent; German intertitles

My Wife, the Movie Star (German: Meine Frau, die Filmschauspielerin) is a 1919 German silent comedy film directed by Ernst Lubitsch and starring Ossi Oswalda, Paul Biensfeldt and Victor Janson.

== Cast ==
- Ossi Oswalda as Ossi, der Filmstar der Fabrik
- Paul Biensfeldt as Dramaturg der Firma
- Victor Janson as Lachmann, Generaldirektor
- Max Kronert as Wastel, Hotelportier
- Julius Dewald as Erich von Schwind
- Hanns Kräly as Dramaturg der Firma

== Bibliography ==
- Bock, Hans-Michael & Bergfelder, Tim. The Concise CineGraph. Encyclopedia of German Cinema. Berghahn Books, 2009.
- Eyman, Scott. Ernst Lubitsch: Laughter in Paradise. Johns Hopkins University Press, 2000.
