= Kohlhiesels Töchter (1920 film) =

1920 film directed by Ernst Lubitsch

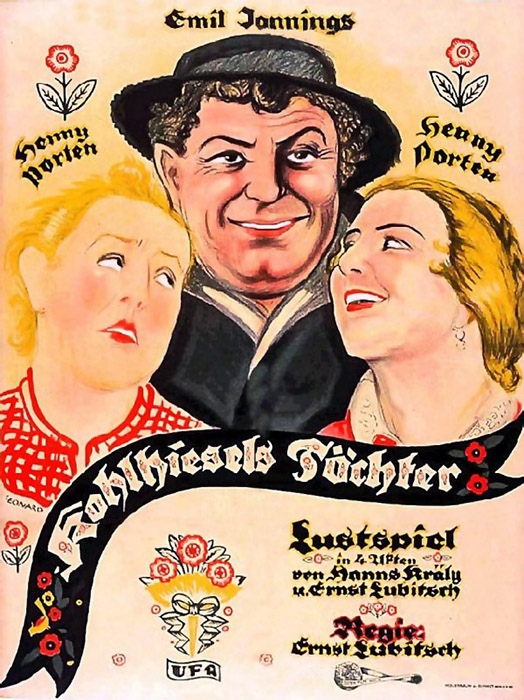
- Directed by: Ernst Lubitsch
- Written by: Hanns Kräly (play); Ernst Lubitsch
- Cinematography: Theodor Sparkuhl
- Music by: Aljoscha Zimmermann
- Production company: Messter Film
- Distributed by: UFA
- Release date: 9 March 1920
- Running time: 40 minutes 63 minutes (German 1992 version); 58 minutes (20 frame/s); 64 minutes (18 frame/s)
- Country: Weimar Republic
- Languages: Silent; German intertitles

Kohlhiesels Töchter (English title: Kohlhiesel's Daughters) is a 1920 German silent comedy film directed by Ernst Lubitsch and starring Henny Porten (in a dual role as sisters), Emil Jannings and Jakob Tiedtke. It is a reworking of Shakespeare's play The Taming of the Shrew. Three remakes were produced, including a 1930 sound remake which also starred Porten.

== Plot ==
Kohlhiesels Töchter

How itinerant peddler Seidenstock is treated by two sisters shows their opposite temperaments. Gretel eagerly purchases a brooch, while her older sister Liesel throws his suitcase of wares out. When Gretel laughs at her, Liesel chases her sister, armed with a milking stool. Gretel runs and complains to their father, Kohhiesel, who slaps Liesel.

Good friends Xaver and Seppl enter Kohlhiesel's inn. Kohlhiesel sends Liesel to serve them. She grumpily pours them beers and leaves, leaving them disgusted. However, when the cheerful Gretel appears, they smile.

The friends return for the Sunday dance at the inn. Liesel is unpopular when she tends the bar, but many young men gather round when it is Gretel's turn. Xaver drives them away so he can get better acquainted with her. When it is a ladies' choice dance, she picks him. He shoves the other dancers away so that he and Gretel can have the floor to themselves. Heated from the dancing, Xaver invites Gretel to go outside. He proposes to her, and she kisses him. Meanwhile, when Seppl refuses to leave after closing time, knocking Kohlhiesel down, the proprietor sends Liesel to throw him out.

Xaver asks Kohlhiesel for his daughter's hand, but he says that Liesel, as the elder sister, must get married first. Xaver offers some young men 30,000 thalers ... to marry Liesel. They all run away. Seppl suggests he marry Liesel himself, then get her to divorce him. Xaver thinks this is a clever plan, while Seppl secretly considers him an idiot. Xaver tells Gretel, and they stage a fake breakup in front of her father. Then he tells Kohlhiesel that he really wants to marry Liesel. When he tells Liesel, she thinks he is joking and douses him with a bucket of water. He persists, and she agrees to marry him, warning him that she will not be so nice afterward.

Seppl consoles the distraught Gretel.

When Liesel serves her husband soup, he likes it, but pretends he does not. She flings away his bowl, so he throws hers too, then smashes the tureen and throws all the furniture out of the room, frightening Liesel.

Xaver sends Gretel a note, arranging a rendezvous. When Seppl sees it, he says he is very sad, and Gretel admits she is too. Seppl kisses her. She runs from the room, then considers and decides his kisses are sweet.

Xaver makes Liesel bring back the furniture, then bullies her. She starts crying, saying she loves him so much, her heart is breaking. Xaver is taken by surprise and does not know how to react.

Seppl goes to see Liesel. He advises her to dress better and make herself look more attractive. It works. Xaver, after getting over his initial shock, kisses and embraces his transformed wife. He writes a letter canceling his rendezvous, while Gretel does the same.

== Cast ==
- Jakob Tiedtke as Mathias Kohlhiesel
- Henny Porten as Liesel and Gretel
- Emil Jannings as Peter Xaver
- Gustav von Wangenheim as Paul Seppl
- Willy Prager as the peddler

== Reputation ==
Lotte H. Eisner considered this film "one of his [Lubitsch's] least refined farces."

Scott Eyman called it "a variation on The Taming of the Shrew, a negligible bit of rustic roughhouse that's sole distinction is the opportunity it gives Henny Porten to play the dual roles of Gretel (Bianca, more or less) and the vile-tempered Liesel (Kate)", but also noted that "Despite its failings, Kohlhiesel's Daughter was an enormous commercial hit, the most popular of all of Ernst's early comedies."

Michael Koller wrote that "Lubitsch’s early films were a product of their era, addressing the audience's senses and emotions. The humour is broad, slapstick and populist, and as unsubtle as the contemporaneous films Buster Keaton made with Fatty Arbuckle."
