= Union-Theater =

Former cinema in Alexanderplatz, Berlin

Coordinates: 52°31′18″N 13°24′48″E

The Union-Theater was a large cinema located on the Alexanderplatz in the German capital Berlin. Opened in 1909 it was the first of a chain of cinemas built by the German film magnate Paul Davidson. Equipped with an orchestra to accompany the action on screen, it provided a model for numerous subsequent film palaces across the German Empire. In 1913 Davidson had it remodelled and expanded its capacity to 1,200 seats, at that time the largest in the country. It hosted a number of premieres of new films, both German and foreign imports.

Like the rest of Davidson's cinemas, it was subsequently taken over by the large UFA concern.

== Bibliography ==
- Elsaesser, Thomas & Wedel, Michael. The BFI companion to German cinema. British Film Institute, 1999.
- Hardt, Ursula. From Caligari to California: Erich Pommer's life in the International Film Wars. Berghahn Books, 1996.
- Kreimeier, Klaus. The Ufa Story: A History of Germany's Greatest Film Company, 1918-1945. University of California Press, 1999.
- Reimer, Robert C. & Reimer, Carol J. The A to Z of German Cinema. Scarecrow Press, 2010.
