= Margarete Kupfer =

German actress (1881–1953)

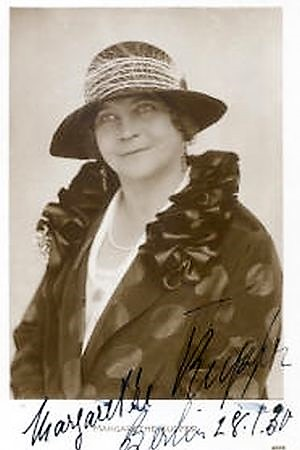
- Kupfer, c. 1930
- Born: Margarete Kupferschmid; 10 April 1881; Freystadt in Schlesien, German Empire
- Died: 11 May 1953 (aged 72); East Berlin, East Germany
- Occupation: Actress
- Years active: 1915–1951

Margarete Kupfer (born Margarete Kupferschmid; 10 April 1881 – 11 May 1953) was a German actress.

== Partial filmography ==
- The Canned Bride (1915)
- Frau Eva (1916)
- The Queen's Secretary (1916)
- When Four Do the Same (1917)
- The Ballet Girl (1918)
- I Don't Want to Be a Man (1918)
- The Foreign Prince (1918)
- The Rosentopf Case (1918)
- The Seeds of Life (1918)
- Carmen (1918)
- Prince Cuckoo (1919)
- The Loves of Käthe Keller (1919)
- The Dancer (1919)
- Sumurun (1920)
- Wibbel the Tailor (1920)
- The Head of Janus (1920)
- Countess Walewska (1920)
- Judith Trachtenberg (1920)
- Waves of Life and Love (1921)
- A Woman's Revenge (1921)
- The Devil and Circe (1921)
- The Hunt for the Truth (1921)
- The Story of a Maid (1921)
- Children of Darkness (1921)
- The Devil's Chains (1921)
- Nathan the Wise (1922)
- Bigamy (1922)
- Only One Night (1922)
- Gold and Luck (1923)
- Nanon (1924)
- Girls You Don't Marry (1924)
- Debit and Credit (1924)
- Dudu, a Human Destiny (1924)
- Orient (1924)
- The Four Marriages of Matthias Merenus (1924)
- Playing with Destiny (1924)
- The Voice of the Heart (1924)
- The Humble Man and the Chanteuse (1925)
- Slums of Berlin (1925)
- Three Waiting Maids (1925)
- The Woman with That Certain Something (1925)
- Women You Rarely Greet (1925)
- The Elegant Bunch (1925)
- Cock of the Roost (1925)
- The Morals of the Alley (1925)
- The Marriage Swindler (1925)
- The Motorist Bride (1925)
- If You Have an Aunt (1925)
- The Salesgirl from the Fashion Store (1925)
- Comedians (1925)
- The Woman without Money (1925)
- The Red Mouse (1926)
- Countess Ironing-Maid (1926)
- I Liked Kissing Women (1926)
- Watch on the Rhine (1926)
- Love's Joys and Woes (1926)
- People to Each Other (1926)
- Fräulein Mama (1926)
- Hunted People (1926)
- The Schimeck Family (1926)
- The Bank Crash of Unter den Linden (1926)
- The Tales of Hermann (1926)
- Children of No Importance (1926)
- The Heart of a German Mother (1926)
- The Bohemian Dancer (1926)
- Why Get a Divorce? (1926)
- Torments of the Night (1926)
- Radio Magic (1927)
- Endangered Girls (1927)
- The Island of Forbidden Kisses (1927)
- One Plus One Equals Three (1927)
- The Awakening of Woman (1927)
- Klettermaxe (1927)
- The Island of Forbidden Kisses (1927)
- Marie's Soldier (1927)
- The Villa in Tiergarten Park (1927)
- Circle of Lovers (1927)
- Carnival Magic (1927)
- That Was Heidelberg on Summer Nights (1927)
- The Love of Jeanne Ney (1927)
- Weekend Magic (1927)
- Eva in Silk (1928)
- Lemke's Widow (1928)
- Today I Was With Frieda (1928)
- Suzy Saxophone (1928)
- Almenrausch and Edelweiss (1928)
- Darling of the Dragoons (1928)
- Beyond the Street (1929)
- Woman in the Moon (1929)
- The Customs Judge (1929)
- Foolish Happiness (1929)
- Midstream (1929)
- What's Wrong with Nanette? (1929)
- From a Bachelor's Diary (1929)
- Cyanide (1930)
- Fairground People (1930)
- It Happens Every Day (1930)
- Rendezvous (1930)
- Der Kongreß tanzt (1931)
- Waves of Life and Love (1921)
- The Unfaithful Eckehart (1931)
- A Tremendously Rich Man (1932)
- A Night in Paradise (1932)
- Thea Roland (1932)
- Spoiling the Game (1932)
- The Blue of Heaven (1932)
- Three from the Unemployment Office (1932)
- Paprika (1932)
- The Sandwich Girl (1933)
- And Who Is Kissing Me? (1933)
- Gretel Wins First Prize (1933)
- Greetings and Kisses, Veronika (1933)
- Bon Voyage (1933)
- At Blonde Kathrein's Place (1934)
- The Black Whale (1934)
- Polish Blood (1934)
- At the Strasbourg (1934)
- A Precocious Girl (1934)
- The Sporck Battalion (1934)
- The Gypsy Baron (1935)
- I Love All the Women (1935)
- The Violet of Potsdamer Platz (1936)
- Escapade (1936)
- Woman's Love—Woman's Suffering (1937)
- The Roundabouts of Handsome Karl (1938)
- What Now, Sibylle? (1938)
- Target in the Clouds (1939)
- A Woman Like You (1939)
- The Three Codonas (1940)
- Mein Leben für Irland (1941)
- Two in a Big City (1942)
- A Beautiful Day (1944)
- Somewhere in Berlin (1946)
- No Place for Love (1947)
- Martina (1949)

== Bibliography ==
- Jung, Uli & Schatzberg, Walter. Beyond Caligari: The Films of Robert Wiene. Berghahn Books, 1999.
