= Theodor Sparkuhl =

German-born cinematographer

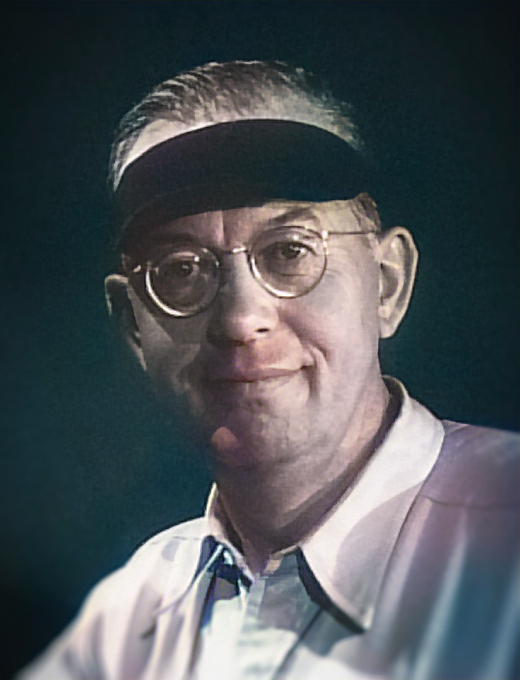
Theodor Sparkuhl, c. 1940, on set

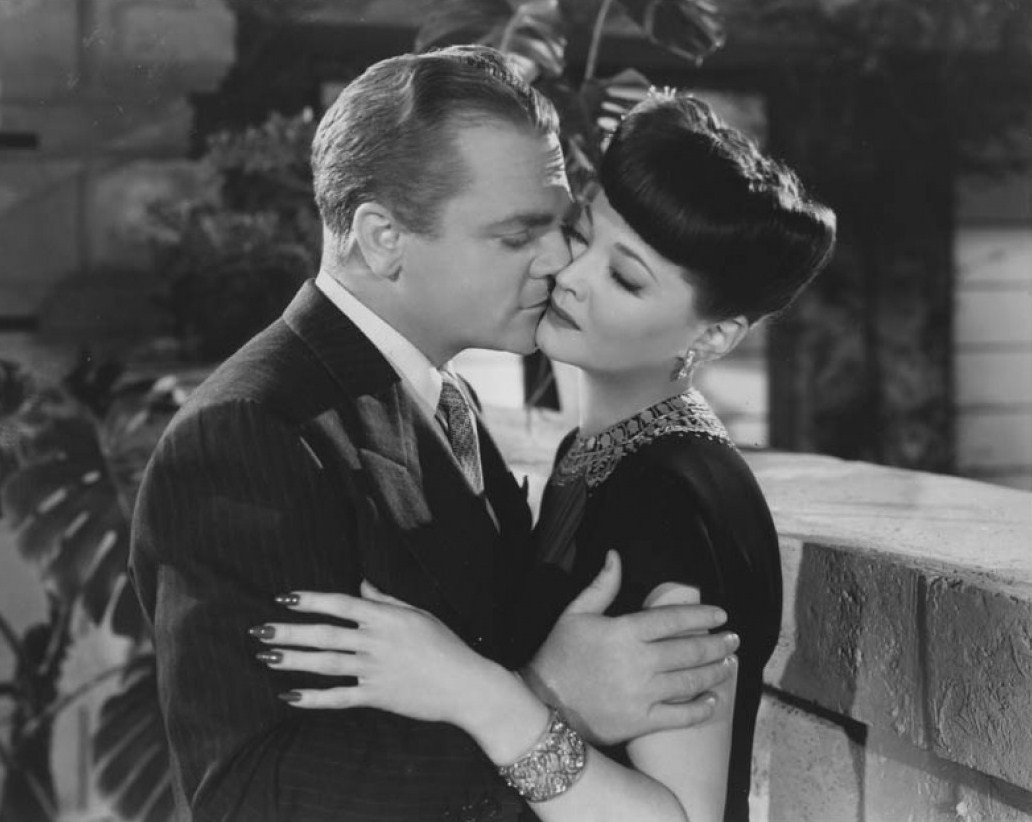
Theodor Sparkuhl

Theodor Sparkuhl (October 7, 1894, Hannover, Germany – June 13, 1946, Los Angeles, California) was a German-born cinematographer with 140 movies to his credit.

Sparkuhl began his career as a projectionist in 1911. He was trained as a newsreel cameraman at the German subsidiary of the French film production company Gaumont in 1912. During World War I he chronicled battles in the Middle East and in Russia. In 1916 he became a lighting director of feature films, working in the German film industry until 1928. He shot twelve films under the direction of Ernst Lubitsch, a collaboration that ended with Lubitsch's emigration to Hollywood in 1922.

From 1928 to 1930 Sparkuhl worked for British International Pictures in London. He relocated to France in 1930, and worked on a number of films, including films directed by Jean Renoir and Marc Allégret. In December 1931 he and his family finally emigrated to Hollywood. He soon signed a contract with Paramount Pictures, where he worked until 1945.

Sparkuhl's most famous films include Renoir's La Chienne (1931), the classic adventure film Beau Geste (1939) and the seminal film noir The Glass Key (1942). The distinctive low-key photography in the latter film and his two other early film noirs Among the Living (1941) and Street of Chance (1942) is a remarkable change from the traditional flat lighting of the typical Hollywood crime films of the 1930s (like the 1935 film version of The Glass Key). Film historians consider Sparkuhl's work in these three films to be a significant contribution to the development of the archetypical noir style and an indication of its debt to German Expressionism and French Poetic realism.

== Selected filmography ==
=== German silent films ===
- I Don't Want to Be a Man (1918)
- The Seeds of Life (1918)
- The Ballet Girl (1918)
- The Flyer from Goerz (1918)
- The Toboggan Cavalier (1918)
- Meyer from Berlin (1919)
- Intoxication (1919)
- The Doll (1919)
- The Oyster Princess (1919)
- Countess Doddy (1919)
- The Merry Husband (1919)
- The Woman at the Crossroads (1919)
- Madame Dubarry (1919)
- My Wife, the Movie Star (1919)
- Kohlhiesel's Daughters (1920)
- Anna Boleyn (1920)
- Romeo and Juliet in the Snow (1920)
- Sumurun (1920)
- The Marquise of Armiani (1920)
- The Sins of the Mother (1921)
- The Story of a Maid (1921)
- Nights of Terror (1921)
- The Wildcat (1921)
- The Loves of Pharaoh (1922)
- The Flame (1923)
- The Island of Tears (1923)
- The Ancient Law (1923)
- The Fifth Street (1923)
- Carlos and Elisabeth (1924)
- Comedy of the Heart (1924)
- The New Land (1924)
- Decameron Nights (1924)
- The Wife of Forty Years (1925)
- The Blackguard (1925)
- Manon Lescaut (1926)
- Madame Wants No Children (1926)
- The Fallen (1926)
- The Boxer's Bride (1926)
- Fedora (1926)
- The Circus of Life (1926)
- Chance the Idol (1927)
- Marie's Soldier (1927)
- The Curse of Vererbung (1927)
- Eva and the Grasshopper (1927)
- Out of the Mist (1927)
- Two Under the Stars (1927)
- The Last Waltz (1927)
- The Devious Path (1928)
- Love's Masquerade (1928)

=== Years in Britain and France ===
- After the Verdict (1929)
- Bright Eyes (1929)
- The Lady from the Sea (1929)
- The Flying Scotsman (1929)
- The Informer (1929)
- Alf's Carpet (1929)
- The Compulsory Husband (1930)
- Harmony Heaven (1930)
- Suspense (1930)
- Moritz Makes his Fortune (1931)
- American Love (1931)
- On purge bébé (1931)
- La Chienne (1931)
- The Lovers of Midnight (1931)
- Black and White (1931)
- Baleydier (1932)

=== Hollywood years ===
- Midnight Club (1933)
- Too Much Harmony (1933)
- Lone Cowboy (1933)
- Caravan (1934)
- No More Women (1934)
- Father Brown, Detective (1934)
- Enter Madame (1935)
- Four Hours to Kill! (1935)
- College Scandal (1935)
- The Last Outpost (1935)
- Ship Cafe (1935)
- 13 Hours by Air (1936)
- Forgotten Faces (1936)
- Yours for the Asking (1936)
- The Big Broadcast of 1937 (1936)
- College Holiday (1936)
- Internes Can't Take Money (1937)
- High, Wide, and Handsome (1937)
- Wells Fargo (1937)
- Dangerous to Know (1938)
- The Texans (1938)
- If I Were King (1938)
- St. Louis Blues (1939)
- The Lady's from Kentucky (1939)
- Beau Geste (1939)
- Rulers of the Sea (1939)
- The Light That Failed (1939)
- Opened by Mistake (1940)
- Queen of the Mob (1940)
- Rangers of Fortune (1940)
- Second Chorus (1940)
- Among the Living (1941)
- Pacific Blackout (1941)
- The Remarkable Andrew (1942)
- Star Spangled Rhythm (1942)
- Wake Island (1942)
- Street of Chance (1942)
- The Glass Key (1942)
- Salute for Three (1943)
- Night Plane from Chungking (1943)
- Johnny Come Lately (1943)
- Salty O'Rourke (1945)
- Blood on the Sun (1945)
- Murder, He Says (1945)
- The Bachelor's Daughters (1946)
