= Paul Meissner =

Austrian architect

- Born: 31 May 1907; Vienna, Austria-Hungary
- Died: 2 June 1983 (aged 76); Vienna, Austria
- Occupation: Architect

Paul Meissner (31 May 1907 – 2 June 1983) was an Austrian architect. His work was part of the architecture event in the art competition at the 1936 Summer Olympics.
