= Ossi Oswalda =

German actress (1898–1947)

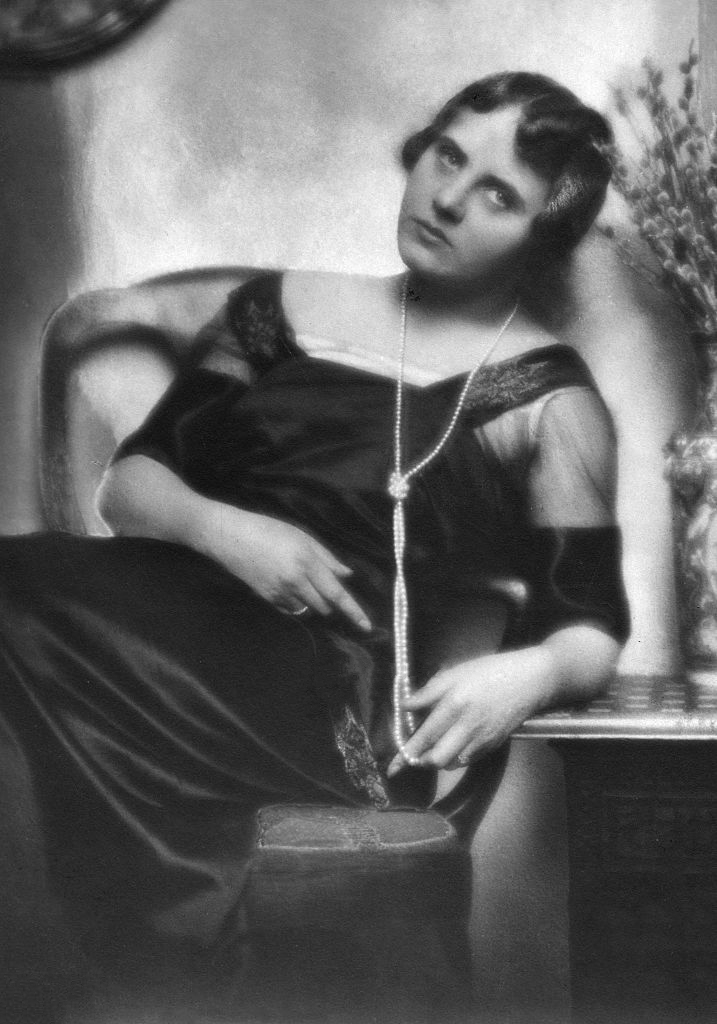
- Oswalda in 1925
- Born: Oswalda Amalie Anna Stäglich; 2 February 1898; Niederschönhausen, Brandenburg, German Empire (now part of Berlin)
- Died: 7 March 1947 (aged 49); Prague, Czechoslovakia
- Occupation: Actress
- Years active: 1916–1933
- Spouse: Baron Gustav Wilhelm Viktor Freiherr von Koczian-Miskolczy (m. 1919; div. 1925)
- Partner: Julius Außenberg

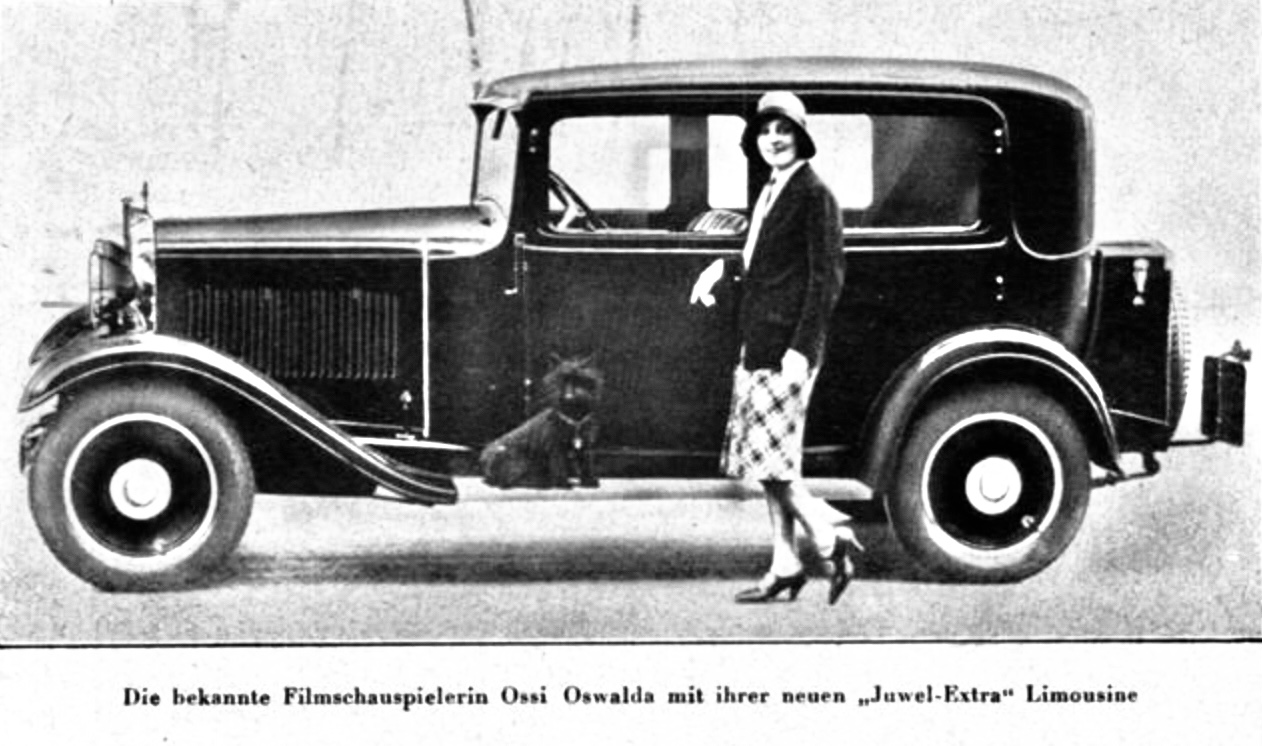
Ossi Oswalda and her Brennabor Juwel

Ossi Oswalda (born Oswalda Amalie Anna Stäglich, 2 February 1898 – 7 March 1947) was a German actress, who mostly appeared in silent films, many of which were early films of German filmmaker Ernst Lubitsch. Her characters were often eccentric, spoiled, and child-like. Oswalda was given the nickname 'The German Mary Pickford' due to her popularity at the time.

== Early life ==
Oswalda Amalie Anna Stäglich was born on 2 February 1898, the daughter of Pauline Marie Anna Stäglich. Oswalda trained as a ballerina and became a dancer for a theater in Berlin as a teenager, working in chorus lines. She made her film debut in Richard Oswald's Nächte des Grauens (A Night of Horror) before being discovered by the actor and screenwriter Hanns Kräly, who in turn recommended her to director Ernst Lubitsch. Lubitsch cast her in his 1916 film The Shoe Palace.

== Film career ==
During her early career, she starred in several films by Lubitsch, including Das fidele Gefängnis, I Don't Want to Be a Man, The Oyster Princess and The Doll. Her success and popularity earned her the aforementioned nickname 'German Mary Pickford'.

In 1921, Oswalda started her own film production company with her husband at the time, the Hungarian Baron Gustav Wilhelm Viktor Freiherr von Koczian-Miskolczy. However, during the next four years they only produced four films, all starring Oswalda. From 1925 on, she was contracted to Universum Film AG (Ufa). The couple divorced in 1925, and Oswalda began a high-profile affair with Wilhelm, German Crown Prince.

Oswalda's career waned along with the silent film era. She signed with an American producer in 1926 and tried to change her image by playing more glamorous characters. This attempt was unsuccessful, and Oswalda only acted in two sound films, making her final appearance on screen in the 1933 film The Star of Valencia. Later on, she became a stage actor, and in 1943, wrote the screenplay for the Czech film Fourteen at the Table.

== Leaving Germany and death ==
In the late 1930s, Oswalda fled Nazi Germany to live in Prague with her partner, former producer Julius Außenberg.

By spring 1947, Oswalda had become bankrupt and was suffering from multiple health problems. At the age of 49, Oswalda died in Prague.

== Filmography ==
- Nächte des Grauens (1916)
- Shoe Palace Pinkus (1916)
- Der Hilferuf (1916)
- Leutnant auf Befehl (1916)
- Der Tod auf Zeche Silva (1916)
- Der G.m.b.H.-Tenor (1916)
- Das fidele Gefängnis (The Merry Jail, 1917)
- Ossi's Tagebuch (1917)
- When Four Do the Same (1917)
- Prinz Sami (1917)
- Dem Licht entgegen (1918)
- The Ballet Girl (1918)
- The Toboggan Cavalier (1918)
- I Don't Want to Be a Man (1918)
- The Swabian Maiden (1919)
- My Wife, the Movie Star (1919)
- Das Mädchen aus dem Wilden Westen (1919)
- Das Millionenmädel (1919)
- Meyer from Berlin (1919)
- The Oyster Princess (1919)
- The Doll (1919)
- Hundemamachen (1920)
- The Housing Shortage (1920)
- Kakadu und Kiebitz (1920)
- Putschliesel (1920)
- Love at the Wheel (1921)
- The Girl with the Mask (1922)
- Das Milliardensouper (1923)
- Ein Weihnachtsfilm für Große (1924)
- Colibri (1924)
- Niniche (1925)
- Express Train of Love (1925)
- The Girl with a Patron (1925)
- The Adventure of Mr. Philip Collins (1925)
- Countess Ironing-Maid (1926)
- The Wooing of Eve (1926)
- Darling, Count the Cash (1926)
- The Little Variety Star (1926)
- The Girl on a Swing (1926)
- A Crazy Night (1927)
- A Serious Case (1927)
- Floretta and Patapon (1927)
- It Attracted Three Fellows (1928)
- The Weekend Bride (1928)
- Eddy Polo mit Pferd und Lasso (1928)
- The House Without Men (1928)
- Sir or Madam (1928)
- Der Dieb im Schlafcoupée (1929)
- The Fourth from the Right (1929)
- Josef the Chaste (1930)
- The Star of Valencia (1933)
