= Paul Davidson (producer) =

German film producer (1867–1927)

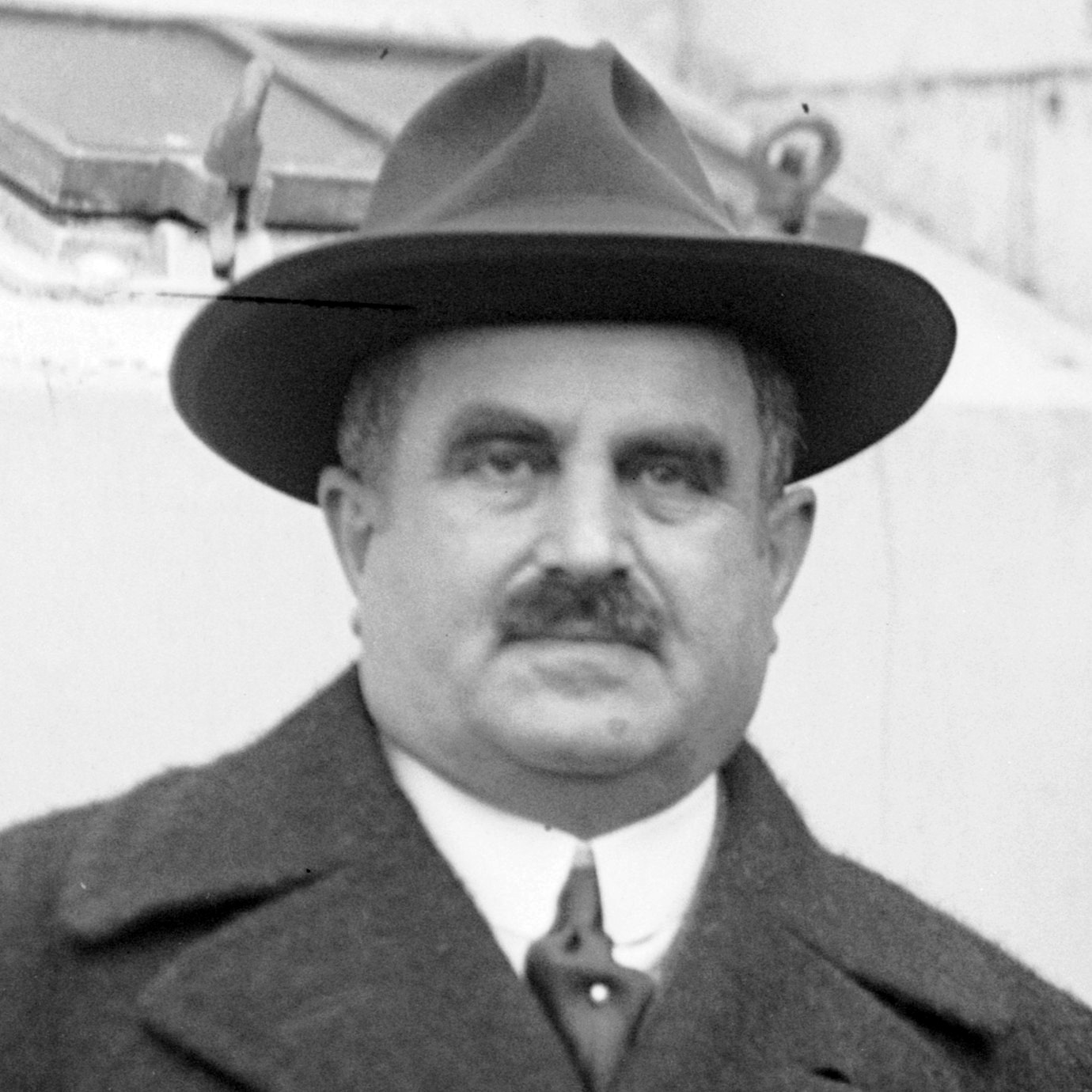
- Paul Davidson
- Born: 30 March 1867 (Note: Thomas Elsaesser (A second life: Germany's cinemas first decades) gives 1871 as year of birth); Lötzen, East Prussia (modern Giżycko, Poland)
- Died: 18 July 1927 (aged 60); Ebenhausen, Weimar Germany (Note: The exact place of death remains unclear: * Hans-Michael Bock (The concise Cinegraph: encyclopaedia of German cinema) gives Ebershausen * Allgemeine Deutsche Biographie: Ebenhausen, Oberbayern * Kay Weniger: Das große Personenlexikon des Films: Dresden on 11 June 1927 * IMDb: Berlin (IMDb biography))
- Occupation: film producer

Paul Davidson (30 March 1867 – 18 July 1927) was a German film producer.

== Biography ==
Paul Davidson was born in Lötzen, East Prussia (modern Giżycko, Poland) the son of Moritz Davidson. He initially worked as a commercial traveller in the textile industry and became the manager of a security firm in Frankfurt am Main in 1902. On vacation to Paris he saw his first movie, a Georges Méliès film, in a cinema. Back in Frankfurt he founded the "Allgemeine Kinematographen-Theater Gesellschaft, Union-Theater für lebende und Tonbilder GmbH" (A.K.T.G.) on 21 March 1906 and opened Mannheim’s first permanent cinema, the Union-Theater (U.T.). Further cinemas followed in Frankfurt, Düsseldorf, Cologne, Strasbourg, Amsterdam and Brussels.

On 4 September 1909 Davidson opened the Union-Theater at Berlin, Alexanderplatz. Another Union-Theater was opened at Berlin's Unter den Linden on 21 August 1910, by 1910 Davidson had built up a "sizeable chain of 600–1000 seater luxury cinemas". On 2 August 1913 the Union-Palast, Kurfürstendamm, one of the first buildings of Berlin exclusively built as a movie theater, premiered with Max Reinhardt’s "Die Insel der Seligen". In March 1910 Davidson founded the Projektions-Aktiengesellschaft Union (PAGU), Germany’s first joint-stock company in film industry and the first to integrate production, distribution and equipment hire.

Following the success of Asta Nielsen’s The Abyss he founded the Internationale Film-Vertriebs-Gesellschaft in conjunction with Nielsen and her husband Urban Gad on 1 June 1911. The company held the European rights on all Nielsen films and Nielsen became a “scintillating international film star” with an annual fee of 85,000 Marks in 1914 alone.

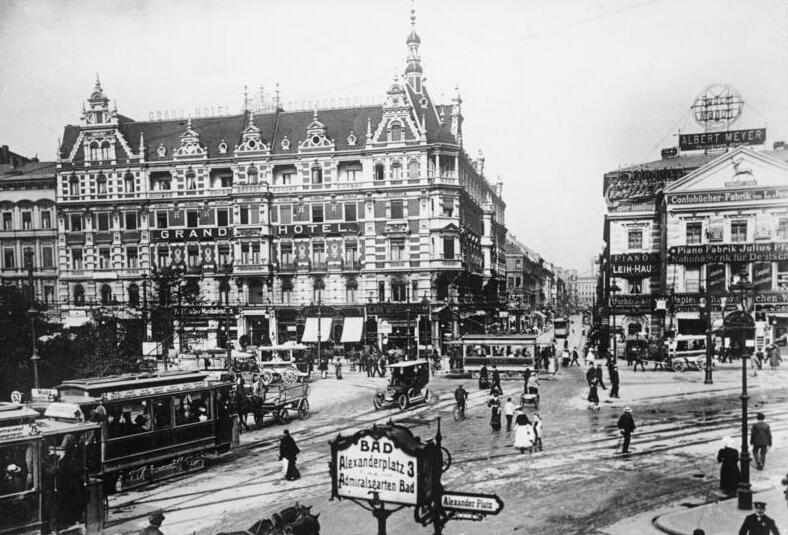
Grand Hotel Alexanderplatz, the location of Davidson’s first Union Theater in Berlin

Davidson described Nielsen as the decisive factor for his move to film productions:

I had not been thinking about film production. But then I saw the first Asta Nielsen film. I realised that the age of short film was past. And above all I realised that this woman was the first artist in the medium of film. Asta Nielsen, I instantly felt could be a global success. It was International film Sales that provided Union with eight Nielsen films per year. I built her a studio in Tempelhof, and set up a big production staff around her. This woman can carry it ... Let the films cost whatever they cost. I used every available means – and devised many new ones – in order to bring the Asta Nielsen films to the world.

In late 1912 the PAGU moved to Berlin and opened a studio in Berlin-Tempelhof (Davidson would also play an important role in the founding of the Babelsberg studios). The PAGU engaged directors like Ernst Lubitsch and Paul Wegener as well as actors like Asta Nielsen, Fern Andra, Pola Negri, Ossi Oswalda, Emil Jannings and Harry Liedtke.

In January 1914 PAGU was merged with Jules Greenbaum’s company to form PAGU-Vitascope, however, the project, including a cooperation with the French Pathé Freres ended at the outbreak of World War I. In August 1915 Davidson sold his cinemas to the Danish Nordisk Film. PAGU became part of the newfounded Universum Film AG (UFA) in 1917 and Davidson worked as the UFA’s artistic director and head of production. In 1920 he left the UFA to produce Lubitsch’s "Das Weib des Pharao" (The Wife of the Pharaoh) and "Die Flamme" (The Flame) within the short-living Europäische Film-Allianz (EFA).

When Lubitsch moved to Hollywood in 1922, Davidson had produced 39 movies directed by Lubitsch. From 1922 he produced pictures independently, but exclusively for the UFA. He canceled his contract early in 1927 and committed suicide on 18 July that year.

== Selected filmography ==
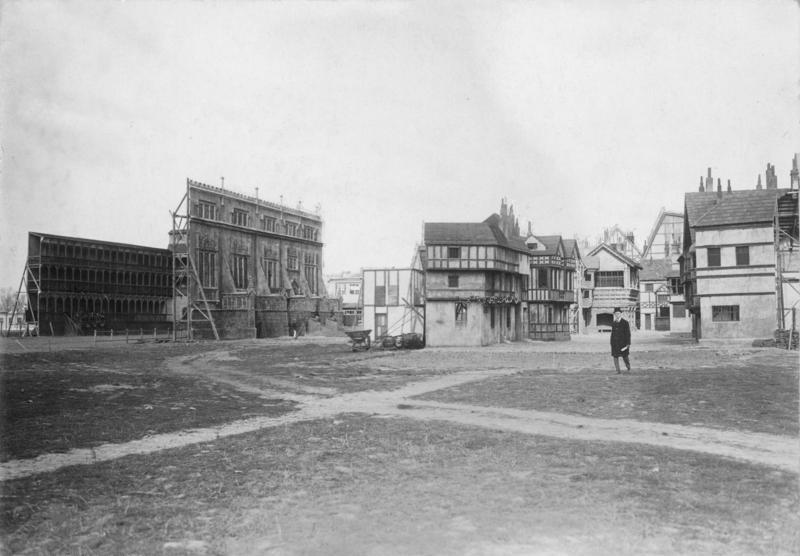
Scenery at the Tempelhof studios (1920)

- The Silent Mill (1914)
- The Firm Gets Married (1914)
- Ivan Koschula (1914)
- The Iron Cross (1914)
- The Tunnel (1915)
- Laugh Bajazzo (1915)
- The Dancer (1915)
- Als ich tot war (1916)
- Rübezahl's Wedding (1916)
- Bogdan Stimoff (1916)
- The Yogi (1916)
- Dr. Hart's Diary (1917)
- The Ring of Giuditta Foscari (1917)
- Unusable (1917)
- Hans Trutz in the Land of Plenty (1917)
- When Four Do the Same (1917)
- The Ballet Girl (1918)
- The Toboggan Cavalier (1918)
- The Seeds of Life (1918)
- The Rosentopf Case (1918)
- Struggling Souls (1918)
- Carmen (1918)
- The Foreign Prince (1918)
- The Flyer from Goerz (1918)
- Mania (1918)
- The Pied Piper of Hamelin (1918)
- I Don't Want to Be a Man (1918)
- Madame Dubarry (1919)
- My Wife, the Movie Star (1919)
- The Howling Wolf (1919)
- The Panther Bride (1919)
- Superstition (1919)
- The Dagger of Malaya (1919)
- The Merry Husband (1919)
- The Galley Slave (1919)
- The Man of Action (1919)
- The Swabian Maiden (1919)
- Out of the Depths (1919)
- The Woman at the Crossroads (1919)
- The Doll (1919)
- Countess Doddy (1919)
- The Teahouse of the Ten Lotus Flowers (1919)
- The Oyster Princess (1919)
- The Golem: How He Came into the World (1920)
- Intrigue (1920)
- Indian Revenge (1920)
- Hundemamachen (1920)
- Sumurun (1920)
- The Last Kolczaks (1920)
- The Closed Chain (1920)
- The Love of a Thief (1920)
- Mascotte (1920)
- The Marquise of Armiani (1920)
- The Housing Shortage (1920)
- The Lady in Black (1920)
- Anna Boleyn (1920)
- Sappho (1921)
- The Maharaja's Favourite Wife (1921)
- The Eternal Struggle (1921)
- The Sins of the Mother (1921)
- Peter Voss, Thief of Millions (1921)
- The Secret of the Mummy (1921)
- The Wildcat (1921)
- His Excellency from Madagascar (1922)
- The Game with Women (1922)
- Tabitha, Stand Up (1922)
- The Pilgrimage of Love (1923)
- Fire of Love (1925)
- The Island of Dreams (1925)
- The Little Variety Star (1926)
