= Scott Eyman =

American writer (born 1951)

Scott Eyman (born March 2, 1951) is an American author, and former book editor and art critic of The Palm Beach Post. He is a frequent book reviewer for The Wall Street Journal and Film Comment, and was a contributor for The New York Observer.

He is an adjunct professor at the University of Miami in the Department of Cinema & Interactive Media, where he has taught film history since 2015.

His books specialize in the Golden Age of Hollywood. He is the author of Cary Grant: A Brilliant Disguise, (Simon & Schuster, 2020); Hank & Jim: The Fifty-Year Friendship of Henry Fonda and James Stewart, (2017); John Wayne: The Life and Legend, (2014); Empire of Dreams: The Epic Life of Cecil B. DeMille, (2010); Louis B. Mayer: Lion of Hollywood (Simon & Schuster, (2005); Print the Legend: The Life and Times of John Ford (2001); Ernst Lubitsch: Laughter in Paradise (1993); The Speed of Sound: Hollywood and the Talkie Revolution 1926-1930 (1997); Mary Pickford: America's Sweetheart (1990), and Five American Cinematographers (1987). With co-author Louis Giannetti, he published Flashback: A Brief History of Film (1986), now in its seventh edition.

Robert Wagner's autobiography, Pieces of My Heart: A Life, written with Eyman, was published on 23 September 2008, and was on the New York Times Bestseller List. Their second collaboration, You Must Remember This, was published March 11, 2014, about life off the studio lot, and was also on the New York Times Bestseller List (March 30, 2014). Their third collaboration was I Loved Her In The Movies: Memories of Hollywood's Legendary Actresses, (2016).

== Books ==
- Flashback: A Brief History of Film (1986) with Louis D. Giannetti
- Five American Cinematographers (1987)
- Mary Pickford: America's Sweetheart (1990)
- Ernst Lubitsch: Laughter in Paradise (1993)
- The Speed of Sound: Hollywood and the Talkie Revolution 1926-1930 (1997)
- Print the Legend: The Life and Times of John Ford (1999)
- Louis B. Mayer: Lion of Hollywood (2005)
- Pieces of My Heart: A Life (2008) with Robert Wagner
- Empire of Dreams: The Epic Life of Cecil B. DeMille (2010)
- You Must Remember This: Life and Style in Hollywood's Golden Age (2014) with Robert Wagner
- John Wayne: The Life and Legend (2014)
- I Loved Her In The Movies: Memories of Hollywood's Legendary Actresses (2016) with Robert Wagner
- Hank & Jim: The Fifty-Year Friendship of Henry Fonda and James Stewart (2017)
- Cary Grant: A Brilliant Disguise (2020)
- 20th Century-Fox: Darryl F. Zanuck and the Creation of the Modern Film Studio (2021)
- Charlie Chaplin vs. America: When Art, Sex, and Politics Collided (2023)
- Joan Crawford: A Woman's Face (2025)
