= Masters of Cinema =

Line of DVD and Blu-ray releases published through Eureka Entertainment

Masters of Cinema is a line of DVD and Blu-ray releases published through Eureka Entertainment. Because of the uniformly branded and spine-numbered packaging and the standard inclusion of booklets and analysis by recurring film historians, the line is often perceived as the UK equivalent of The Criterion Collection.

== History ==
The line takes its name from a film website by the same name that was launched in 2001 and covered the work of well-regarded film directors such as Andrei Tarkovsky, Akira Kurosawa, Carl Theodor Dreyer and Yasujirō Ozu. In 2004, the website began coordinating with Eureka Entertainment to offer a line of DVDs that focused on renowned filmmakers and films considered to be the best of their type. In 2008, the organization was sold to Eureka Entertainment and became a wholly owned label of the company.

== Collaborations ==
In their effort to create definitive editions, the line complements their releases with a collection of new or available scholarly material such as interviews, documentaries, essays, and commentary tracks. Filmmakers such as Guillermo del Toro, Martin Scorsese, Peter Watkins and Claude Lanzmann, scholars such as Tony Rayns, David Bordwell and David Kalat and critics such as Kent Jones, Phillip Lopate, Adrian Martin and Jonathan Rosenbaum have all created exclusive content that was used for releases in the line.

== Releases ==
Masters of Cinema started releasing titles on DVD in 2004. In 2008, the company expanded the range to include Blu-ray and Dual Format releases. As of 2024, the company has released over 300 films under the line, including more than 160 films on Blu-ray.

== Reception ==
Releases under the line are often voted among the best home video releases, including in the best of the year lists by Sight and Sound. Little White Lies listed six releases from the line in their top twenty releases of 2015, and four in 2016.

The Guardian chose their release of Silent Running as the best reissue of that year.
