= Ferry Sikla =

German actor

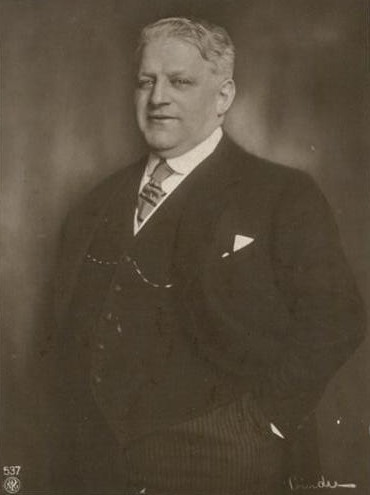
- Sikla circa 1920
- Born: Ferry Sykla; 11 March 1865; Free and Hanseatic City of Hamburg
- Died: 8 February 1932 (aged 66); Dresden, Germany
- Occupation: Actor
- Years active: 1914–1931

Ferry Sikla (born Ferry Sykla; 11 March 1865 – 8 February 1932) was a German stage and film actor. He appeared in more than fifty films from 1914 to 1931.

== Selected filmography ==
Year	Title	Role	Notes
1918	I Don't Want to Be a Man		
1919	Alkohol		
1920	What a Girl		
1920	Whitechapel		
1920	The Count of Cagliostro		
1923	All for Money		
1923	The Tiger of Circus Farini		
1923	Tragedy of Love		
1925	Comedians		
1926	The Three Mannequins		
1928	Herkules Maier		
1928	Volga Volga		
1929	Jenny's Stroll Through Men		
