= Tempelhof Studios =

Film studios in Berlin

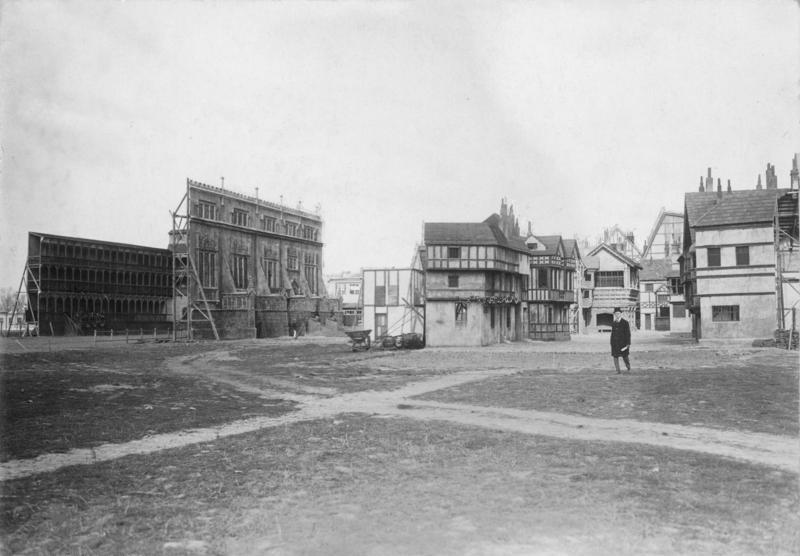
The Studio in 1920

The Tempelhof Studios are a film studio located in Tempelhof in the German capital of Berlin. They were founded in 1912, during the silent era, by German film pioneer Alfred Duskes, who built a glass-roofed studio on the site with financial backing from the French company Pathé. The producer Paul Davidson's PAGU then took control and constructed a grander structure. The First World War propaganda drama The Yellow Passport, the historical film Madame Dubarry and the expressionist 1920 silent film The Golem were made there by PAGU.

During the 1920s the site came into the hands of the dominant German company UFA which also controlled the Babelsberg and Staaken Studios in the city. It was used for several of the company's major productions during the Weimar Republic including The Last Laugh.

It was partly used by Terra Film during the Nazi era. In 1945 the studios were captured by Soviet Army troops during the Battle of Berlin while the shooting of the comedy film Tell the Truth was under way. It was later located in Western Berlin and used for West German film and television production during the Cold War.

== Bibliography ==
- Bergfelder, Tim. International Adventures: German Popular Cinema and European Co-Productions in the 1960s. Berghahn Books, 2005.
- Elsaesser, Thomas & Wedel, Michael. A Second Life: German Cinema's First Decades. Amsterdam University Press, 1996.
- Eyman, Scott. Ernst Lubitsch: Laughter in Paradise. JHU Press, 2000.
- Kreimeier, Klaus. The Ufa Story: A History of Germany's Greatest Film Company, 1918–1945.University of California Press, 1999.
- Prawer, S.S. Between Two Worlds: The Jewish Presence in German and Austrian Film, 1910–1933. Berghahn Books, 2005.
