= PAGU =

German silent film company

The Projektions-AG Union (generally shortened to PAGU) was a German film production company which operated between 1911 and 1924 during the silent era. From 1917 onwards, the company functioned as an independent unit of Universum Film AG, and was eventually merged into it entirely.

The company was founded by Paul Davidson, a leading cinema-owner who branched out into production. Initially it was based in Frankfurt, but quickly moved its headquarters to Berlin as it was clear that this had become the centre of the German film industry.

At the time, the majority of films being shown in Germany were foreign-produced, a situation which Davidson attempted to change. One of his first major coups was signing up the Danish film star Asta Nielsen for a lengthy contract. A rising star of the company was also the actor-director Ernst Lubitsch who made a series of comedies for PAGU. PAGU was also notable for its success in breaking a boycott of German playwrights, who were refusing to allow their works to be adapted for the screen. Davidson was even able to persuade the leading German stage director Max Reinhardt to make two films, shot in Italy, for the company.

The company's position was boosted when the First World War broke out and the German government restricted the screening of non-German films. Davidson produced propaganda films at the request of the government, such as Dr. Hart's Diary (1917). This led the same year to PAGU becoming a founder of the new government-backed conglomerate UFA, which merged many of German's leading production companies into a single organisation which would dominate German cinema for the next thirty years. Now functioning as one of several production units of UFA, the company made further propaganda films such as The Yellow Passport (1918).

Following the end of the war, Davidson grew increasingly unhappy with his subordinate position at UFA, and he resigned from the company in 1922. Germany's film industry boomed after 1918 and was increasingly artistically respected, partly due to the films produced by Davidson's PAGU production unit featuring Emil Jannings and Pola Negri. Davidson made an attempt to buy back PAGU from UFA, but this was rejected - partly because it was believed he was backed by the large Hollywood studios who wished to gain a foothold in the German market. Soon afterwards, PAGU's existence as a notionally separate company was brought to an end.

== Bibliography ==
- Prawer, S.S. Between Two Worlds: The Jewish Presence in German and Austrian Film, 1910-1933. Berghahn Books, 2005.
