= List of UFA films =

This is a list of films produced or distributed by the German company Universum Film AG (UFA) founded in 1917 by a merger of several existing companies. It was the largest German studio during the Weimar Republic and continued this dominance during the Nazi era, where it formed part of a cartel along with Bavaria Film, Tobis Film and Terra Film.

It ceased active production following the Second World War, and its assets were put into a trust in a move by the Allied Occupation authorities to prevent too powerful a single German company being revived. Through the acquisition of the distribution company Prisma Film, the trustees were able to get around the ban around production in the mid-1950s. The UFA brand itself was revived from 1956 when the assets including the Tempelhof Studios were sold off to the Deutsche Bank. With the support of the West German government, it returned to production for several years but was unable to recapture the success of the earlier days and sustained heavy losses. A number of films released under these years were handled by the UFA-owned distributor Prisma Film. In 1964 the UFA was bought by Bertelsmann.

== 1910s ==
Title	Release date	Director	Notes
Precious Stones	February 1918	Rudolf Biebrach	Messter Film
Put to the Test	March 1918	Rudolf Biebrach	Messter Film
The Toboggan Cavalier	March 1918	Ernst Lubitsch	PAGU
The Ringwall Family	April 1918	Rudolf Biebrach	Messter Film
Waves of Fate	April 1918	Joe May	May-Film
The Adventure of a Ball Night	May 1918	Viggo Larsen	Messter Film
Agnes Arnau and Her Three Suitors	May 1918	Rudolf Biebrach	Messter Film
The Sacrifice	May 1918	Joe May	May-Film
The Salamander Ruby	June 1918	Rudolf Biebrach	Messter Film
The Ballet Girl	September 1918	Ernst Lubitsch	PAGU
Five Minutes Too Late	September 1918	Uwe Jens Krafft	May-Film
The Flyer from Goerz	September 1918	Georg Jacoby	PAGU
The Rosentopf Case	September 1918	Ernst Lubitsch	PAGU
The Son of Hannibal	September 1918	Viggo Larsen	Messter Film
The Victors	September 1918	Rudolf Biebrach	Messter Film
Die Augen der Mumie Ma	October 1918	Ernst Lubitsch	PAGU
The Homecoming of Odysseus	October 1918	Rudolf Biebrach	Messter Film
The Rat	October 1918	Joe May, Harry Piel	May-Film. Part of the Joe Deebs series.
The Seeds of Life	October 1918	Georg Jacoby	PAGU. Released in two parts.
Your Big Secret	October 1918	Joe May	May-Film
The Beggar Countess	November 1918	Joe May	May-Film
The Blue Lantern	November 1918	Rudolf Biebrach	Messter Film
Der Gelbe Schein	November 1918	Victor Janson	PAGU
Mania	November 1918	Eugen Illés	PAGU
The Pied Piper of Hamelin	November 1918	Paul Wegener	PAGU
Carmen	December 1918	Ernst Lubitsch	PAGU
The Lady	December 1918	Rudolf Biebrach	Messter Film
Lorenzo Burghardt	December 1918	William Wauer	Greenbaum Film
Meyer from Berlin	January 1919	Ernst Lubitsch	PAGU
My Wife, the Movie Star	January 1919	Ernst Lubitsch	PAGU
The Platonic Marriage	January 1919	Paul Leni	May-Film
Irrungen	February 1919	Rudolf Biebrach	Messter Film
The Man of Action	February 1919	Victor Janson	PAGU
The Carousel of Life	March 1919	Georg Jacoby	PAGU
Die Diamanten des Zaren	April 1919	Viggo Larsen	Messter Film
Her Sport	April 1919	Rudolf Biebrach	Messter Film
Veritas vincit	April 1919	Joe May	May-Film
The Spinning Ball	May 1919	Rudolf Biebrach	Messter Film
The Woman at the Crossroads	June 1919	Georg Jacoby	PAGU
The Panther Bride	July 1919	Léo Lasko	PAGU. Part of the Joe Deebs series.
Ruth's Two Husbands	July 1919	Rudolf Biebrach	Messter Film
Arme Thea	August 1919	Carl Froelich	
The Daughter of Mehemed	August 1919	Alfred Halm	Messter Film
The Living Dead	August 1919	Rudolf Biebrach	Messter Film
The Merry Husband	August 1919	Léo Lasko	PAGU
Vendetta	August 1919	Georg Jacoby	PAGU
Madame Dubarry	September 1919	Ernst Lubitsch	PAGU
Superstition	September 1919	Georg Jacoby	PAGU
Comrades	October 1919	Johannes Guter	
The Galley Slave	October 1919	Paul Wegener, Rochus Gliese	PAGU. Released in two parts.
The Love of Marion Bach	October 1919	Heinrich Bolten-Baeckers	
Rose Bernd	October 1919	Alfred Halm	Messter Film
Countess Doddy	November 1919	Georg Jacoby	PAGU
The Dagger of Malaya	November 1919	Léo Lasko	PAGU. Part of the Joe Deebs series.
A Drive into the Blue	November 1919	Rudolf Biebrach	PAGU
The Doll	December 1919	Ernst Lubitsch	PAGU
The Howling Wolf	December 1919	Léo Lasko	PAGU. Part of the Joe Deebs series.
The Mistress of the World	December 1919	Joe May	May-Film. Released in eight parts.

== 1920s ==
Title	Release date	Director	Notes
Die Duplizität der Ereignisse	January 1920	Adolf Gärtner	Greenbaum-Film
Monika Vogelsang	January 1920	Rudolf Biebrach	Messter Film
Der Amönenhof	February 1920	Uwe Jens Krafft	May-Film
Hundemamachen	February 1920	Rudolf Biebrach	PAGU
The Marquise of Armiani	February 1920	Alfred Halm	PAGU
Mascotte	February 1920	Felix Basch	PAGU
Das rosa Trikot	February 1920	Léo Lasko	PAGU
Kohlhiesel's Daughters	March 1920	Ernst Lubitsch	Messter Film
The Last Kolczaks	March 1920	Alfred Halm	PAGU
The Voice	March 1920	Adolf Gartner	Greenbaum-Film
Indian Revenge	April 1920	Georg Jacoby, Léo Lasko	PAGU
The Sons of Count Dossy	May 1920	Adolf Gartner	Greenbaum-Film
Va banque	June 1920	Léo Lasko	
The Golden Crown	August 1920	Alfred Halm	Messter Film
Das Skelett des Herrn Markutius	August 1920	Victor Janson	PAGU. Part of the Joe Deebs series.
Der verbotene Weg	August 1920	Henrik Galeen	Rex-Film
The White Peacock	August 1920	Ewald André Dupont	
Der Henker von Sankt Marien	September 1920	Fritz Freisler	May-Film
Whitechapel	September 1920	Ewald André Dupont	
The Golem	October 1920	Paul Wegener	PAGU
Intrigue	October 1920	Paul L. Stein	PAGU
The Lady in Black	October 1920	Victor Janson	PAGU. Part of the Joe Deebs series.
The Legend of Holy Simplicity	October 1920	Joe May	May-Film
Princess Woronzoff	October 1920	Adolf Gärtner	
The Gallant King	November 1920	Alfred Halm	Messter Film
The Guilt of Lavinia Morland	November 1920	Joe May	May-Film
Helmsman Holk	November 1920	Rochus Gliese	
Anna Boleyn	December 1920	Ernst Lubitsch	PAGU
The Closed Chain	December 1920	Paul L. Stein	PAGU
Napoleon and the Little Washerwoman	December 1920	Adolf Gärtner	
The Red Peacock	December 1920	Paul L. Stein	PAGU
The Wandering Image	December 1920	Fritz Lang	May-Film
The Bull of Olivera	January 1921	Erich Schönfelder	Messter Film
The Maharaja's Favourite Wife	January 1921	Max Mack	PAGU
Murder Without Cause	January 1921	Ewald André Dupont	
The Women of Gnadenstein	January 1921	Robert Dinesen, Joe May	May-Film
The Conspiracy in Genoa	February 1921	Paul Leni	
Hannerl and Her Lovers	February 1921	Felix Basch	
The Lost Shadow	February 1921	Rochus Gliese	PAGU
The Secret of the Mummy	February 1921	Victor Janson	PAGU. Part of the Joe Deebs series.
The Passion of Inge Krafft	March 1921	Robert Dinesen	May-Film
Peter Voss, Thief of Millions	March 1921	Georg Jacoby	PAGU. Released in six parts.
The Sacrifice of Ellen Larsen	April 1921	Paul L. Stein	PAGU
The Wildcat	April 1921	Ernst Lubitsch	PAGU
A Woman's Revenge	April 1921	Robert Wiene	
A Blackmailer's Trick	May 1921	Erich Schönfelder	PAGU. Part of the Joe Deebs series.
Danton	May 1921	Dimitri Buchowetzki	
Junge Mama	May 1921	Uwe Jens Krafft, Joe May	May-Film
Man Overboard	May 1921	Karl Grune	
The White Death	May 1921	Adolf Gartner	
Nachtbesuch in der Northernbank	June 1921	Karl Grune	
The Solemn Oath	June 1921	Rudolf Biebrach	
The Brothers Karamazov	July 1921	Carl Froelich, Dimitri Buchowetzki	
The Inheritance of Tordis	July 1921	Robert Dinesen	May-Film
Ilona	August 1921	Robert Dinesen	May-Film
The Pearl of the Orient	August 1921	Karlheinz Martin	Messter Film
Seafaring Is Necessary	August 1921	Rudolf Biebrach	
Sturmflut des Lebens	August 1921	Paul L. Stein	PAGU
The Adventure of Doctor Kircheisen	September 1921	Rudolf Biebrach	
The Handicap of Love	September 1921	Martin Hartwig	PAGU. Part of the Joe Deebs series.
Die kleine Dagmar	September 1921	Alfred Halm	
Roswolsky's Mistress	September 1921	Felix Basch	Messter Film
Sappho	September 1921	Dimitri Buchowetzki	PAGU
Treasure of the Aztecs	September 1921	Karl Heiland	
The Vulture Wally	September 1921	Ewald André Dupont	
The Adventuress of Monte Carlo	October 1921	Adolf Gärtner	Released in three parts
The Eternal Struggle	October 1921	Paul L. Stein	PAGU
The Fateful Day	October 1921	Adolf E. Licho	Messter Film
Love at the Wheel	October 1921	Victor Janson	
The Riddle of the Sphinx	October 1921	Adolf Gärtner	
The Hunt for the Truth	November 1921	Karl Grune	
Children of Darkness	December 1921	Ewald André Dupont	Released in two parts
The Eternal Curse	December 1921	Fritz Wendhausen	Decla-Bioscop
Father Won't Allow It	December 1921	Erich Schönfelder	PAGU
Hintertreppe	December 1921	Paul Leni	
Kean	December 1921	Rudolf Biebrach	
Murders in the Greenstreet	December 1921	Johannes Guter	Decla-Bioscop
Circus of Life	December 1921	Johannes Guter	Decla-Bioscop
The Curse of Silence	January 1922	Felix Basch	
Fridericus Rex	January 1922	Arzén von Cserépy	Cserépy Film. Released in four parts.
His Excellency from Madagascar	January 1922	Georg Jacoby	PAGU. Released in two parts.
Madame de La Pommeraye's Intrigues	January 1922	Fritz Wendhausen	Decla-Bioscop
Barmaid	February 1922	Johannes Guter	Decla-Bioscop
Die Dame und der Landstreicher	February 1922	Alfred Halm	
The Girl with the Mask	February 1922	Victor Janson	
Othello	February 1922	Dimitri Buchowetzki	
Schuld und Sühne	February 1922	Rudolf Biebrach	
Today's Children	February 1922	Adolf E. Licho	Messter Film
Women's Sacrifice	February 1922	Karl Grune	
The Game with Women	March 1922	Adolf E. Licho	PAGU
Shadows of the Past	March 1922	Rudolf Biebrach	
Die siebtente Nacht	March 1922	Arthur Teuber	
Circus People	April 1922	William Kahn	
Dr. Mabuse the Gambler	April 1922	Fritz Lang	Released in two parts
The Stream	April 1922	Felix Basch	
Im Kampf mit dem unsichtbaren Feind	June 1922	Erich Schönfelder	
She and the Three	June 1922	Ewald André Dupont	
The False Prince	July 1922	Erwin Baron	
Sodoms Ende	July 1922	Felix Basch	
Luise Millerin	August 1922	Carl Froelich	
The Stowaway	August 1922	Victor Janson	
Good-for-Nothing	September 1922	Carl Froelich	
Lumpaci the Vagabond	September 1922	Carl Wilhelm	
Lucrezia Borgia	October 1922	Richard Oswald	
Power of Temptation	October 1922	Paul L. Stein	PAGU
To the Ladies' Paradise	October 1922	Lupu Pick	Rex-Film
Vanina	October 1922	Arthur von Gerlach	PAGU
The Call of Destiny	November 1922	Johannes Guter	
It Illuminates, My Dear	November 1922	Paul L. Stein	PAGU
Navarro the Dancer	November 1922	Ludwig Wolff	
Phantom	November 1922	Friedrich Wilhelm Murnau	Decla-Bioscop
The False Dimitri	December 1922	Hans Steinhoff	
The Girl Without a Conscience	December 1922	William Kahn	
Lola Montez, the King's Dancer	December 1922	Willi Wolff	
Lowlands	December 1922	Adolf E. Licho	Decla-Bioscop
Tabitha, Stand Up	December 1922	Robert Dinesen	PAGU
The Comedian's Child	January 1923	Fred Sauer	
Explosion	January 1923	Karl Grune	
The Pilgrimage of Love	January 1923	Yakov Protazanov	PAGU
The Stone Rider	January 1923	Fritz Wendhausen	Decla-Bioscop
City in View	February 1923	Henrik Galeen	Rex-Film
A Glass of Water	February 1923	Ludwig Berger	Decla-Bioscop
Nora	February 1923	Berthold Viertel	PAGU
Old Heidelberg	March 1923	Hans Behrendt	
The Woman Worth Millions	March 1923	Willi Wolff	Released in three parts
The House Without Laughter	April 1923	Gerhard Lamprecht	Rex-Film
Princess Suwarin	April 1923	Johannes Guter	Decla-Bioscop
The Weather Station	April 1923	Carl Froelich	
Das Milliardensouper	June 1923	Victor Janson	
The Buddenbrooks	August 1923	Gerhard Lamprecht	
The Tiger of Circus Farini	August 1923	Uwe Jens Krafft	
Certificates of Death	September 1923	Lothar Mendes	May-Film
Tatjana	September 1923	Robert Dinesen	Messter Film
Tragedy of Love	September 1923	Joe May	May-Film
The Countess of Paris	October 1923	Dimitri Buchowetzki, Joe May	May-Film
The Expulsion	October 1923	Friedrich Wilhelm Murnau	Decla-Bioscop
The Green Manuela	October 1923	Ewald André Dupont	
His Wife, The Unknown	October 1923	Benjamin Christensen	Decla-Bioscop
Inge Larsen	October 1923	Hans Steinhoff	
All for Money	November 1923	Reinhold Schünzel	
The Street	November 1923	Karl Grune	
The Journey to Happiness	December 1923	Heinrich Bolten-Baeckers	
The Lost Shoe	December 1923	Ludwig Berger	Decla-Bioscop
The Evangelist	January 1924	Holger-Madsen	
Everybody's Woman	January 1924	Alexander Korda	Made in Austria
The Grand Duke's Finances	January 1924	Friedrich Wilhelm Murnau	
The Great Unknown	January 1924	Willi Wolff	
New Year's Eve	January 1924	Lupu Pick	Rex-Film
Leap Into Life	February 1924	Johannes Guter	Messter Film
Die Nibelungen	February 1924	Fritz Lang	Released in two parts
The Radio Marriage	March 1924	Wilhelm Prager	
Horrido	April 1924	Johannes Meyer	
Tragedy in the House of Habsburg	May 1924	Alexander Korda	
Comedy of the Heart	September 1924	Rochus Gliese	PAGU
Decameron Nights	September 1924	Herbert Wilcox	Co-production with Britain
Michael	September 1924	Carl Theodor Dreyer	
My Leopold	September 1924	Heinrich Bolten-Baeckers	
The Other Woman	September 1924	Gerhard Lamprecht	
Husbands or Lovers	November 1924	Paul Czinner	
Strong Winds	November 1924	Reinhold Schünzel	
Waxworks	November 1924	Paul Leni	
The Last Laugh	December 1924	Friedrich Wilhelm Murnau	
The Love Letters of Baroness S	December 1924	Henrik Galeen	May-Film
Man Against Man	December 1924	Hans Steinhoff	
Modern Marriages	December 1924	Hans Otto	Co-production with Czechoslovakia
The Wonderful Adventure	December 1924	Manfred Noa	
I Love You	January 1925	Paul L. Stein	
Struggle for the Soil	January 1925	Erich Waschneck	
The Tower of Silence	January 1925	Johannes Guter	
Chronicles of the Gray House	February 1925	Arthur von Gerlach	
Peter the Pirate	February 1925	Arthur Robison	
Flight Around the World	March 1925	Willi Wolff	Released in two parts
The Island of Dreams	March 1925	Paul L. Stein	
Neptune Bewitched	March 1925	Willi Achsel	
Ways to Strength and Beauty	March 1925	Wilhelm Prager	Documentary
Wood Love	March 1925	Hans Neumann	
Father Voss	April 1925	Max Mack	
The Painter and His Model	April 1925	Jean Manoussi	Co-production with France
The Found Bride	April 1925	Rochus Gliese	
Express Train of Love	May 1925	Johannes Guter	
The Director General	August 1925	Fritz Wendhausen	
Fire of Love	September 1925	Paul L. Stein	
Jealousy	September 1925	Karl Grune	
The Blackguard	October 1925	Graham Cutts	Co-production with Britain
The Farmer from Texas	October 1925	Joe May	
Love's Finale	October 1925	Felix Basch	
Love is Blind	October 1925	Lothar Mendes	
Should We Get Married?	October 1925	Manfred Noa	
The Telephone Operator	October 1925	Hanns Schwarz	
Dancing Mad	November 1925	Alexander Korda	Felsom Film
The Gentleman Without a Residence	November 1925	Heinrich Bolten-Baeckers	
Love Story	November 1925	Fritz Freisler	
Shadows of the Metropolis	November 1925	Willi Wolff	
Ship in Distress	November 1925	Fred Sauer	
Variety	November 1925	Ewald Andre Dupont	
The Adventure of Mr. Philip Collins	December 1925	Johannes Guter	
The Girl with a Patron	December 1925	Max Mack	
The Man in the Saddle	December 1925	Manfred Noa	
The Second Mother	December 1925	Heinrich Bolten-Baeckers	
A Waltz Dream	December 1925	Ludwig Berger	
The Woman Who Did	December 1925	Benjamin Christensen	
The Great Duchess	January 1926	Willi Wolff	
The House of Lies	January 1926	Lupu Pick	
My Friend the Chauffeur	January 1926	Erich Waschneck	
The Poacher	January 1926	Johannes Meyer	
Tartuffe	January 1926	Friedrich Wilhelm Murnau	
Manon Lescaut	February 1926	Arthur Robison	
The Brothers Schellenberg	March 1926	Karl Grune	
False Shame	March 1926	Rudolf Biebrach	
The Fiddler of Florence	March 1926	Paul Czinner	
The Last Horse Carriage in Berlin	March 1926	Carl Boese	
The Pink Diamond	March 1926	Rochus Gliese	
Secrets of a Soul	March 1926	Georg Wilhelm Pabst	
Two and a Lady	March 1926	Alwin Neuss	
The Wooing of Eve	April 1926	Max Mack	
Three Cuckoo Clocks	May 1926	Lothar Mendes	
When She Starts, Look Out	May 1926	Géza von Bolváry	
Maytime	August 1926	Willi Wolff	
The Boxer's Bride	September 1926	Johannes Guter	
His Toughest Case	September 1926	Fritz Wendhausen	
The Little Variety Star	September 1926	Hanns Schwarz	
The Man in the Fire	September 1926	Erich Waschneck	
Faust	October 1926	F. W. Murnau	
Grandstand for General Staff	October 1926	Hans Otto, Erich Schönfelder	Co-production with Austria
The Flames Lie	October 1926	Carl Froelich	
The Good Reputation	October 1926	Pierre Marodon	
Chaste Susanne	November 1926	Richard Eichberg	
The Circus of Life	November 1926	Mario Bonnard	
Countess Ironing-Maid	November 1926	Constantin J. David	
The Love of the Bajadere	November 1926	Géza von Bolváry	
The Master of Death	November 1926	Hans Steinhoff	
The Armoured Vault	December 1926	Lupu Pick	
The Holy Mountain	December 1926	Arnold Fanck	
It's Easy to Become a Father	December 1926	Erich Schönfelder	
A Sister of Six	December 1926	Ragnar Hyltén-Cavallius	Co-production with Sweden
The Son of Hannibal	December 1926	Felix Basch	
We'll Meet Again in the Heimat	December 1926	Reinhold Schünzel	
Metropolis	January 1927	Fritz Lang	
A Modern Dubarry	January 1927	Alexander Korda	Felsom Film
Potsdam	January 1927	Hans Behrendt	
Marie's Soldier	February 1927	Erich Schönfelder	
My Aunt, Your Aunt	February 1927	Carl Froelich	
Tragedy of a Marriage	February 1927	Maurice Elvey	
The Csardas Princess	March 1927	Hanns Schwarz	
Durchlaucht Radieschen	March 1927	Richard Eichberg	
Heads Up, Charley	March 1927	Willi Wolff	
The Imaginary Baron	March 1927	Willi Wolff	
The Bordellos of Algiers	May 1927	Wolfgang Hoffmann-Harnisch	
Hello Caesar!	May 1927	Reinhold Schünzel	
Eva and the Grasshopper	June 1927	Georg Asagaroff	
Heaven on Earth	June 1927	Reinhold Schünzel	
The Most Beautiful Legs of Berlin	July 1927	Willi Wolff	
The Last Waltz	August 1927	Arthur Robison	
Always Be True and Faithful	September 1927	Reinhold Schünzel	
At the Edge of the World	September 1927	Karl Grune	
Grand Hotel	September 1927	Johannes Guter	
His Late Excellency	September 1927	Adolf E. Licho, Wilhelm Thiele	
The Prince of Pappenheim	September 1927	Richard Eichberg	
The Trial of Donald Westhof	September 1927	Fritz Wendhausen	
The Woman in the Cupboard	September 1927	Rudolf Biebrach	
Fabulous Lola	October 1927	Richard Eichberg	
The Lady with the Tiger Skin	October 1927	Willi Wolff	
The Long Intermission	November 1927	Carl Froelich	
The Merry Farmer	November 1927	Franz Seitz	
Apaches of Paris	December 1927	Nikolai Malikoff	Co-production with France
The Great Leap	December 1927	Arnold Fanck	
The House of Prellstein	December 1927	Lupu Pick	
The Love of Jeanne Ney	December 1927	Georg Wilhelm Pabst	
Vacation from Marriage	December 1927	Victor Janson	
You Walk So Softly	December 1927	Reinhold Schünzel	
Doña Juana	January 1928	Paul Czinner	
Die Hölle der Jungfrauen	January 1928	Robert Dinesen	
The Serfs	January 1928	Richard Eichberg	
Violantha	January 1928	Carl Froelich	
The Woman from Till 12	January 1928	Erich Schönfelder	
The Doctor's Women	February 1928	Gustaf Molander	Co-production with Sweden
Guilty	February 1928	Johannes Meyer	
Herkules Maier	February 1928	Alexander Esway	
The Love Commandment	February 1928	Victor Janson	
Panic	February 1928	Harry Piel	
Sajenko the Soviet	February 1928	Erich Waschneck	
Love and Thieves	March 1928	Carl Froelich	
The Mysterious Mirror	March 1928	Carl Hoffmann	
Spies	March 1928	Fritz Lang	
The White Stadium	March 1928	Arnold Fanck	Documentary
Man Against Man	May 1928	Harry Piel	
Lotte	April 1928	Carl Froelich	
Milak, the Greenland Hunter	June 1928	Georg Asagaroff	
Because I Love You	July 1928	Johannes Guter	
The Girl from the Revue	July 1928	The Girl from the Revue	
Escape	August 1928	Carl Froelich	
Homecoming	August 1928	Joe May	
Under Suspicion	August 1928	Constantin J. David	
Yacht of the Seven Sins	August 1928	Jacob Fleck, Luise Fleck	
The Lady with the Mask	September 1928	Wilhelm Thiele	
Looping the Loop	September 1928	Arthur Robison	
Adam and Eve	October 1928	Rudolf Biebrach	
Docks of Hamburg	October 1928	Erich Waschneck	
His Strongest Weapon	October 1928	Harry Piel	
Secrets of the Orient	October 1928	Alexandre Volkoff	
The Blue Mouse	November 1928	Johannes Guter	
Hungarian Rhapsody	November 1928	Hanns Schwarz	
Hurrah! I Live!	December 1928	Wilhelm Thiele	
Struggle for the Matterhorn	December 1928	Mario Bonnard, Nunzio Malasomma	
Her Dark Secret	January 1929	Johannes Guter	
Scandal in Baden-Baden	January 1929	Erich Waschneck	
Asphalt	March 1929	Joe May	
The Wonderful Lies of Nina Petrovna	April 1929	Hanns Schwarz	
The Smuggler's Bride of Mallorca	July 1929	Hans Behrendt	
Convict of Stamboul	August 1929	Gustav Ucicky	
Manolescu	August 1929	Viktor Tourjansky	
The Model from Montparnasse	August 1929	Wilhelm Thiele	
Why Cry at Parting?	August 1929	Richard Eichberg	
The Wrecker	August 1929	Géza von Bolváry	Felsom Film. Co-production with Britain.
The Flight from Love	September 1929	Hans Behrendt	
Woman in the Moon	October 1929	Fritz Lang	
High Treason	November 1929	Johannes Meyer	
Once You Give Away Your Heart	November 1929	Johannes Guter	
The League of Three	December 1929	Hans Behrendt	
Melody of the Heart	December 1929	Hanns Schwarz	Ufa's first sound film

== 1930s ==
Title	Release date	Director	Notes
The White Devil	January 1930	Alexandre Volkoff	
The Immortal Vagabond	February 1930	Gustav Ucicky, Joe May	
Waltz of Love	February 1930	Wilhelm Thiele	English version also released
Alraune	March 1930	Richard Oswald	
The Last Company	March 1930	Curtis Bernhardt	
The Blue Angel	April 1930	Josef von Sternberg	English version also released
The Tiger Murder Case	April 1930	Johannes Meyer	
Hocuspocus	July 1930	Gustav Ucicky	English version also released
The Shot in the Sound Film Studio	July 1930	Alfred Zeisler	
Farewell	August 1930	Robert Siodmak	
A Student's Song of Heidelberg	August 1930	Karl Hartl	
Dolly Gets Ahead	September 1930	Anatole Litvak	
Love's Carnival	September 1930	Hans Steinhoff	
The Three from the Filling Station	September 1930	Wilhelm Thiele	French version also released
Darling of the Gods	October 1930	Hanns Schwarz	
The Singing City	October 1930	Carmine Gallone	
The Blonde Nightingale	November 1930	Johannes Meyer	
The Stolen Face	November 1930	Philipp Lothar Mayring	
Burglars	December 1930	Hanns Schwarz	French version also released
The Flute Concert of Sanssouci	December 1930	Gustav Ucicky	
The Man in Search of His Murderer	February 1931	Robert Siodmak	
Her Grace Commands	March 1931	Hanns Schwarz	French version also released
The Wrong Husband	March 1931	Johannes Guter	
Inquest	April 1931	Robert Siodmak	French version also released
Der Stumme von Portici	May 1931	Kurt Gerron	
Bombs on Monte Carlo	August 1931	Hanns Schwarz	English version, French version also released
The Scoundrel	June 1931	Eugen Schüfftan, Franz Wenzler	
No More Love	July 1931	Anatole Litvak	French version also released
In the Employ of the Secret Service	August 1931	Gustav Ucicky	
The Little Escapade	August 1931	Reinhold Schünzel	French version also released
Express 13	May 1931	Alfred Zeisler	
The Battle of Bademunde	September 1931	Philipp Lothar Mayring	
My Wife, the Impostor	September 1931	Kurt Gerron	French version also released
Congress Dances	October 1931	Erik Charell	English version, French version also released
Sein Scheidungsgrund	October 1931	Alfred Zeisler	
Der Hochtourist	November 1931	Alfred Zeisler	
Emil and the Detectives	December 1931	Gerhard Lamprecht	
Ronny	December 1931	Reinhold Schünzel	French version also released
Yorck	December 1931	Gustav Ucicky	
Storms of Passion	January 1932	Robert Siodmak	French version also released
Mamsell Nitouche	February 1932	Carl Lamac	
Things Are Getting Better Already	February 1932	Kurt Gerron	
Two Hearts Beat as One	February 1932	Wilhelm Thiele	French version also released
The Victor	March 1932	Hans Hinrich, Paul Martin	French version also released
The Cheeky Devil	April 1932	Carl Boese, Heinz Hille	French version also released
The Countess of Monte Cristo	April 1932	Karl Hartl	
A Mad Idea	May 1932	Kurt Gerron	
The Song of Night	May 1932	Anatole Litvak	
A Shot at Dawn	June 1932	Alfred Zeisler	French version also released
Man Without a Name	July 1932	Gustav Ucicky	French version also released
The Beautiful Adventure	August 1932	Reinhold Schünzel	French version also released
Quick	August 1932	Robert Siodmak	French version also released
A Blonde Dream	September 1932	Paul Martin	English version, French version also released
Sehnsucht 202	September 1932	Max Neufeld	Co-production with Austria
The Black Hussar	October 1932	Gerhard Lamprecht	
How Shall I Tell My Husband?	October 1932	Reinhold Schünzel	
Spoiling the Game	October 1932	Alfred Zeisler	French version also released
I by Day, You by Night	November 1932	Ludwig Berger	English version, French version also released
The White Demon	November 1932	Kurt Gerron	French version also released
Contest	December 1932	Erich Schönfelder	
F.P.1	December 1932	Karl Hartl	English version, French version also released
When Love Sets the Fashion	December 1932	Franz Wenzler	
A Door Opens	January 1933	Alfred Zeisler	
A Thousand for One Night	January 1933	Max Mack	Co-production with Czechoslovakia
What Men Know	January 1933	Gerhard Lamprecht	
And the Plains Are Gleaming	February 1933	Heinz Hille	Co-production with Hungary
Morgenrot	February 1933	Gustav Ucicky	
Laughing Heirs	March 1933	Max Ophüls	
The Empress and I	April 1933	Friedrich Hollaender	English version, French version also released
A Song for You	April 1933	Joe May	French version also released
Kind, ich freu' mich auf Dein Kommen	June 1933	Kurt Gerron, Erich von Neusser	
Season in Cairo	July 1933	Reinhold Schünzel	French version also released
The Star of Valencia	July 1933	Alfred Zeisler	French version also released
Ein gewisser Herr Gran	August 1933	Gerhard Lamprecht	French version also released
Love Must Be Understood	August 1933	Hans Steinhoff	
Happy Days in Aranjuez	September 1933	Johannes Meyer	French version also released
Hitlerjunge Quex	September 1933	Hans Steinhoff	
Du sollst nicht begehren	October 1933	Richard Schneider-Edenkoben	
Refugees	October 1933	Gustav Ucicky	French version also released
The Tsarevich	October 1933	Victor Janson	French version also released
Waltz War	October 1933	Ludwig Berger	French version also released
Abel mit der Mundharmonika	November 1933	Erich Waschneck	
The Castle in the South	November 1933	Géza von Bolváry	French version also released
The Country Schoolmaster	November 1933	Carl Heinz Wolff	
Her Highness the Saleswoman	November 1933	Karl Hartl	French version also released
Inge and the Millions	December 1933	Erich Engel	
Young Dessau's Great Love	December 1933	Arthur Robison	French version also released
Victor and Victoria	December 1933	Reinhold Schünzel	French version also released
Rivalen der Luft	January 1934	Frank Wisbar	
Just Once a Great Lady	February 1934	Gerhard Lamprecht	French version also released
The Girlfriend of a Big Man	March 1934	Paul Wegener	
My Heart Calls You	March 1934	Carmine Gallone	French version also released
Gold	March 1934	Karl Hartl	French version also released
Freut Euch des Lebens	May 1934	Hans Steinhoff	
Die Töchter ihrer Exzellenz	May 1934	Reinhold Schünzel	French version also released
The Csardas Princess	June 1934	Georg Jacoby	French version also released
A Man Wants to Get to Germany	July 1934	Paul Wegener	
Hubertus Castle	July 1934	Hans Deppe	
The Island	August 1934	Hans Steinhoff	French version also released
The Young Baron Neuhaus	September 1934	Gustav Ucicky	French version also released
Playing with Fire	September 1934	Ralph Arthur Roberts	
Count Woronzeff	October 1934	Arthur Robison	French version also released
Jungfrau gegen Mönch	October 1934	E.W. Emo	
Decoy	November 1934	Hans Steinhoff	French version also released
The Eternal Dream	November 1934	Arnold Fanck	
Princess Turandot	November 1934	Gerhard Lamprecht	French version also released
Holiday From Myself	December 1934	Hans Deppe	
Love, Death and the Devil	December 1934	Heinz Hilpert, Reinhart Steinbicker	French version also released
Punks Arrives from America	January 1935	Karlheinz Martin	
Fresh Wind from Canada	February 1935	Erich Holder	French version also released
The Foolish Virgin	February 1935	Richard Schneider-Edenkoben	
Barcarole	March 1935	Gerhard Lamprecht	French version also released
Triumph of the Will	March 1935	Leni Riefenstahl	Propaganda documentary
The Gypsy Baron	April 1935	Karl Hartl	
Joan of Arc	April 1935	Gustav Ucicky	
Marriage Strike	May 1935	Georg Jacoby	
Make Me Happy	July 1935	Arthur Robison	French version also released
Amphitryon	July 1935	Reinhold Schünzel	French version also released
I Love All the Women	August 1935	Carl Lamac	French version also released
The Royal Waltz	September 1935	Herbert Maisch	French version also released
The Green Domino	October 1935	Herbert Selpin	French version also released
Lady Windermere's Fan	October 1935	Heinz Hilpert	Distributed by Tobis Film
Light Cavalry	October 1935	Werner Hochbaum	French version also released
April, April!	October 1935	Douglas Sirk	
The Girl from the Marsh Croft	October 1935	Douglas Sirk	
One Too Many on Board	October 1935	Gerhard Lamprecht	French version also released
The Monastery's Hunter	November 1935	Max Obal	
The Young Count	December 1935	Carl Lamac	
Liebeslied	December 1935	Fritz Peter Buch	
Pillars of Society	December 1935	Douglas Sirk	
Black Roses	December 1935	Paul Martin	English version, French version also released
The Higher Command	December 1935	Gerhard Lamprecht	
Donogoo Tonka	January 1936	Reinhold Schünzel	French version also released
The Last Four on Santa Cruz	February 1936	Werner Klingle	
The Haunted Castle	March 1936	Max Obal	
Heißes Blut	March 1936	Georg Jacoby	
Savoy Hotel 217	April 1936	Gustav Ucicky	
A Strange Guest	April 1936	Gerhard Lamprecht	
Hilde Petersen postlagernd	May 1936	Victor Janson	
Honeymoon	May 1936	Carl Lamac	
Schlußakkord	June 1936	Douglas Sirk	
Women's Regiment	July 1936	Karl Ritter	
Winter in the Woods	July 1936	Fritz Peter Buch	
Boccaccio	July 1936	Herbert Maisch	
Inkognito	July 1936	Richard Schneider-Edenkoben	
The Beggar Student	August 1936	Georg Jacoby	
Männer vor der Ehe	August 1936	Carl Boese	
Lucky Kids	August 1936	Paul Martin	French version also released
Militiaman Bruggler	August 1936	Werner Klingler	
The Hour of Temptation	September 1936	Paul Wegener	
The Traitor	September 1936	Karl Ritter	
Manja Valewska	October 1936	Josef Rovenský	Made in Austria
The Girl Irene	October 1936	Reinhold Schünzel	
City of Anatol	October 1936	Viktor Tourjansky	French version also released
Annemarie. Die Geschichte einer jungen Liebe	November 1936	Fritz Peter Buch	
The Hunter of Fall	November 1936	Hans Deppe	
The Court Concert	December 1936	Douglas Sirk	French version also released
Under Blazing Heavens	December 1936	Gustav Ucicky	
A Girl from the Chorus	January 1937	Carl Lamac	
Ride to Freedom	January 1937	Karl Hartl	
Und du mein Schatz fährst mit	January 1937	Georg Jacoby	
Dangerous Crossing	January 1937	Robert A. Stemmle	
The Kreutzer Sonata	February 1937	Veit Harlan	
Men Without a Fatherland	February 1937	Herbert Maisch	
Vor Liebe wird gewarnt	February 1937	Carl Lamac	
The Ways of Love Are Strange	March 1937	Hans H. Zerlett	
Das schöne Fräulein Schragg	April 1937	Hans Deppe	
The Chief Witness	April 1937	Georg Jacoby	
Wie der Hase läuft	May 1937	Carl Boese	
My Son the Minister	July 1937	Veit Harlan	
The Man Who Was Sherlock Holmes	July 1937	Karl Hartl	
When Women Keep Silent	July 1937	Fritz Kirchhoff	
Carousel	August 1937	Alwin Elling	
Seven Slaps	August 1937	Paul Martin	
Patriots	August 1937	Karl Ritter	
To New Shores	August 1937	Douglas Sirk	
Operation Michael	September 1937	Karl Ritter	
Spiel auf der Tenne	September 1937	Georg Jacoby	
Streit um den Knaben Jo	September 1937	Erich Waschneck	
Daphne and the Diplomat	September 1937	Robert A. Stemmle	
Diamonds	October 1937	Eduard von Borsody	
Fanny Elssler	November 1937	Paul Martin	
Gewitterflug zu Claudia	November 1937	Erich Waschneck	
Der Schimmelkrieg in der Holledau	November 1937	Alois Johannes Lippl	
Zweimal zwei im Himmelbett	December 1937	Hans Deppe	
Gasparone	December 1937	Georg Jacoby	
My Friend Barbara	December 1937	Fritz Kirchhoff	
La Habanera	December 1937	Douglas Sirk	
Starke Herzen	December 1937	Herbert Maisch	
The Mystery of Betty Bonn	January 1938	Robert A. Stemmle	
Urlaub auf Ehrenwort	January 1938	Karl Ritter	
Frau Sylvelin	February 1938	Herbert Maisch	
Storms in May	February 1938	Hans Deppe	
Between the Parents	March 1938	Hans Hinrich	
Anna Favetti	April 1938	Erich Waschneck	
Faded Melody	April 1938	Viktor Tourjansky	
The Girl of Last Night	April 1938	Peter Paul Brauer	
Kleiner Mann – ganz groß!	April 1938	Robert A. Stemmle	
Ma soeur de lait	May 1938	Jean Boyer	Co-production with France
The Strange Monsieur Victor	May 1938	Jean Grémillon	Co-production with France
Triad	May 1938	Hans Hinrich	
Heimat	June 1938	Carl Froelich	
Nights in Andalusia	July 1938	Herbert Maisch	Spanish version also released
What Now, Sibylle?	July 1938	Peter Paul Brauer	
Capriccio	August 1938	Karl Ritter	
Fortsetzung folgt	August 1938	Paul Martin	
S.O.S. Sahara	August 1938	Jacques de Baroncelli	Co-production with France
Adrienne Lecouvreur	September 1938	Marcel L'Herbier	
By a Silken Thread	September 1938	Robert A. Stemmle	
The Deruga Case	September 1938	Fritz Peter Buch	
Frau Sixta	September 1938	Gustav Ucicky	
Gastspiel im Paradies	September 1938	Karl Hartl	
A Girl Goes Ashore	September 1938	Werner Hochbaum	
A Night in May	September 1938	Georg Jacoby	
Northern Lights	September 1938	Herbert B. Fredersdorf	
The Four Companions	October 1938	Carl Froelich	
Dance on the Volcano	November 1938	Hans Steinhoff	
Rubber	November 1938	Eduard von Borsody	
Nanon	November 1938	Herbert Maisch	
Skola základ zivota	November 1938	Martin Frič	Made in Czechoslovakia
The Blue Fox	December 1938	Viktor Tourjansky	
Pour le Mérite	December 1938	Karl Ritter	
A Prussian Love Story	December 1938	Paul Martin	
Das Verlegenheitskind	December 1938	Peter Paul Brauer	
Women for Golden Hill	December 1938	Erich Waschneck	
King of the Edelweiss	January 1939	Paul May	
War es der im 3. Stock?	January 1939	Carl Boese	
Cocoanut	February 1939	Jean Boyer	Co-production with France
The Green Emperor	February 1939	Paul Mundorf	
Castles in the Air	March 1939	Augusto Genina	Co-production with Italy
Coral Reefs	March 1939	Maurice Gleize	Co-production with France
Hotel Sacher	March 1939	Erich Engel	
Drei Unteroffiziere	March 1939	Werner Hochbaum	
Ich bin gleich wieder da	April 1939	Peter Paul Brauer	
Der Florentiner Hut	April 1939	Wolfgang Liebeneiner	
The Wedding Trip	April 1939	Karl Ritter	
Prinzessin Sissy	April 1939	Fritz Thiery	
Die kluge Schwiegermutter	May 1939	Hans Deppe	
Detours to Happiness	May 1939	Fritz Peter Buch	
Nightclub Hostess	June 1939	Albert Valentin	Co-production with France
Woman at the Wheel	June 1939	Paul Martin	
Fräulein	July 1939	Erich Waschneck	
Die Geliebte	July 1939	Gerhard Lamprecht	
Hallo Janine!	July 1939	Carl Boese	
Heimatland	August 1939	Ernst Martin	
The Life and Loves of Tschaikovsky	August 1939	Carl Froelich	
Man for Man	August 1939	Robert A. Stemmle	
Cadets	September 1939	Karl Ritter	
The Sensational Casilla Trial	September 1939	Eduard von Borsody	
Three Fathers for Anna	September 1939	Carl Boese	
Twelve Minutes After Midnight	September 1939	Johannes Guter	
Jiný vzduch	October 1939	Martin Frič	Czech-language film
Kennwort Machin	October 1939	Erich Waschneck	
Waldrausch	October 1939	Paul May	
Hurrah! I'm a Father	November 1939	Kurt Hoffmann	
The Desert Song	November 1939	Paul Martin	
Congo Express	December 1939	Eduard von Borsody	
Her First Experience	December 1939	Josef von Báky	
A Mother's Love	December 1939	Gustav Ucicky	
My Aunt, Your Aunt	December 1939	Carl Boese	
Der Stammbaum des Dr. Pistorius	December 1939	Karl Georg Külb	
Legion Condor	Unreleased	Karl Ritter	

== 1940s ==
Title	Release date	Director	Notes
The Catacombs	February 1940	Martin Frič	Made in Czechoslovakia
Commissioner Eyck	March 1940	Milo Harbich	
Der Postmeister	April 1940	Gustav Ucicky	
Twilight	April 1940	Rudolf van der Noss	
Bal paré	May 1940	Karl Ritter	
The Girl at the Reception	May 1940	Gerhard Lamprecht	
Liebesschule	May 1940	Karl Georg Külb	
The Mondesir Heir	May 1940	Albert Valentin	Prewar co-production with France
The Rothschilds	July 1940	Erich Waschneck	
Beates Flitterwoche	August 1940	Paul May	
Wie konntest Du, Veronika!	August 1940	Milo Harbich	
Left of the Isar, Right of the Spree	September 1940	Paul May	Made with Bavaria Film
Baron Prášil	September 1940	Martin Frič	Made in Czechoslovakia
Die unvollkommene Liebe	October 1940	Erich Waschneck	
Between Hamburg and Haiti	November 1940	Erich Waschneck	
Das Herz der Königin	November 1940	Carl Froelich	
Das leichte Mädchen	November 1940	Fritz Peter Buch	
Kora Terry	November 1940	Georg Jacoby	
Der Kleinstadtpoet	December 1940	Josef von Báky	
Die keusche Geliebte	December 1940	Viktor Tourjansky	
Wunschkonzert	December 1940	Eduard von Borsody	
Hochzeitsnacht	February 1941	Carl Boese	
Der laufende Berg	March 1941	Hans Deppe	
Above All Else in the World	March 1941	Karl Ritter	
Männerwirtschaft	March 1941	Johannes Meyer	
Riding for Germany	April 1941	Arthur Maria Rabenalt	
Jungens	May 1941	Robert A. Stemmle	
U-boats Westward!	May 1941	Günther Rittau	
The Way to Freedom	May 1941	Rolf Hansen	
Stukas	June 1941	Karl Ritter	
The Gasman	August 1941	Carl Froelich	
Heimkehr	August 1941	Gustav Ucicky	
Annelie	September 1941	Josef von Báky	
Women Are Better Diplomats	October 1941	Georg Jacoby	
Tanz mit dem Kaiser	December 1941	Georg Jacoby	
Illusion	December 1941	Viktor Tourjansky	
Violanta	May 1942	Paul May	
Between Heaven and Earth	June 1942	Harald Braun	
The Great Love	June 1942	Rolf Hansen	
Wedding in Barenhof	June 1942	Carl Froelich	
Attack on Baku	August 1942	Fritz Kirchhoff	
The Red Terror	August 1942	Karl Ritter	
5 June	August 1942	Fritz Kirchhoff	
Die goldene Stadt	September 1942	Veit Harlan	
Diesel	November 1942	Gerhard Lamprecht	
Love Me	December 1942	Harald Braun	
Whom the Gods Love	December 1942	Karl Hartl	
The War of the Oxen	January 1943	Hans Deppe	
Back Then	March 1943	Rolf Hansen	
Liebesgeschichten	March 1943	Viktor Tourjansky	
Nacht ohne Abschied	March 1943	Erich Waschneck	
Münchhausen	March 1943	Josef von Báky	
A Salzburg Comedy	April 1943	Hans Deppe	
Germanin	May 1943	Max W. Kimmich	
The Master of the Estate	June 1943	Hans Deppe	
Die Gattin	August 1943	Georg Jacoby	
Gefährlicher Frühling	November 1943	Hans Deppe	
The Crew of the Dora	November 1943	Karl Ritter	
Immensee	December 1943	Veit Harlan	
Love Letters	January 1944	Hans H. Zerlett	
Nora	February 1944	Harald Braun	
The Buchholz Family	March 1944	Carl Froelich	
Marriage of Affection	March 1944	Carl Froelich	
A Wife for Three Days	April 1944	Fritz Kirchhoff	
Dreaming	May 1944	Harald Braun	
Junge Adler	May 1944	Alfred Weidenmann	
Summer Nights	June 1944	Karl Ritter	
Why Are You Lying, Elisabeth?	August 1944	Fritz Kirchhoff	
The Woman of My Dreams	August 1944	Georg Jacoby	
Opfergang	October 1944	Veit Harlan	
A Cheerful House	November 1944	Johannes Guter	
Young Hearts	November 1944	Boleslaw Barlog	
The Wedding Hotel	December 1944	Carl Boese	
Der Puppenspieler	January 1945	Alfred Braun	
Kolberg	January 1945	Veit Harlan	
The Noltenius Brothers	February 1945	Gerhard Lamprecht	
The Silent Guest	March 1945	Harald Braun	
Via Mala	April 1945	Josef von Báky	
Kamerad Hedwig	Unreleased	Gerhard Lamprecht	
Das Leben geht weiter	Unreleased	Wolfgang Liebeneiner	
Die Schenke zur ewigen Liebe	Unreleased	Alfred Weidenmann	Shot in 1945
Under the Bridges	September 1946	Helmut Käutner	Shot in 1944
Jan und die Schwindlerin	March 1947	Hans Weißbach	Shot in 1943
Fahrt ins Glück	August 1948	Erich Engel	Shot in 1944
How Do We Tell Our Children?	December 1949	Hans Deppe	Shot in 1944
Der Posaunist	December 1949	Carl Boese	Shot in 1944

== 1950s ==
Title	Release date	Director	Notes
Vier Treppen rechts	July 1950	Kurt Werther	Shot in 1944
Erzieherin gesucht	October 1950	Ulrich Erfurth	Shot in 1944
Eyes of Love	October 1951	Alfred Braun	Shot in 1944
Espionage	April 1955	Franz Antel	Made in Austria
Heaven Is Never Booked Up	July 1955	Alfred Weidenmann	Capitol Film
Before God and Man	September 1955	Erich Engel	Capitol Film
Der Frontgockel	October 1955	Ferdinand Dörfler	
Bonjour Kathrin	January 1956	Karl Anton	
The Girl from Flanders	February 1956	Helmut Käutner	Capitol Film
Dany, bitte schreiben Sie	May 1956	Eduard von Borsody	
Black Forest Melody	August 1956	Géza von Bolváry	
Die Rosel vom Schwarzwald	September 1956	Rudolf Schündler	
Von der Liebe besiegt	December 1956	Luis Trenker	
Stresemann	January 1957	Alfred Braun	
Jede Nacht in einem anderen Bett	January 1957	Paul Verhoeven	
Der schräge Otto	January 1957	Géza von Cziffra	
Zwei Herzen voller Seligkeit	March 1957	J. A. Holman	
Victor and Victoria	April 1957	Karl Anton	
...und die Liebe lacht dazu	May 1957	Robert A. Stemmle	
Aunt Wanda from Uganda	June 1957	Géza von Cziffra	
Two Bavarians in the Jungle	June 1957	Ludwig Bender	
Kindermädchen für Papa gesucht	July 1957	Hans Quest	
Das Glück liegt auf der Straße	August 1957	Franz Antel	
Two Bavarians in the Harem	September 1957	Joe Stöckel	
Mit Rosen fängt die Liebe an	September 1957	Peter Hamel	Made in Austria
The Big Chance	September 1957	Victor Janson	
Das Schloß in Tirol	October 1957	Géza von Radványi	Made in Austria
Liebe, Jazz und Übermut	October 1957	Erik Ode	
Almenrausch and Edelweiss	December 1957	Harald Reinl	
Sissi – Fateful Years of an Empress	December 1957	Ernst Marischka	Made in Austria
Escape from Sahara	January 1958	Wolfgang Staudte	
Voyage to Italy, Complete with Love	January 1958	Wolfgang Becker	
Two Hearts in May	January 1958	Géza von Bolváry	
Scampolo	February 1958	Alfred Weidenmann	
Mikosch, the Pride of the Company	February 1958	Rudolf Schündler	
It Happened Only Once	March 1958	Géza von Bolváry	
Liebe kann wie Gift sein	July 1958	Veit Harlan	
Pezzo, capopezzo e capitano	July 1958	Wolfgang Staudte	Co-production with Italy
Munchhausen in Africa	July 1958	Werner Jacobs	
Blitzmädels an die Front	August 1958	Werner Klingler	
Ist Mama nicht fabelhaft?	August 1958	Peter Beauvais	
One Should Be Twenty Again	August 1958	Hans Quest	Made in Austria
False Shame	September 1958	Wolfgang Glück	
That Won't Keep a Sailor Down	September 1958	Arthur Maria Rabenalt	
Hoch klingt der Radetzkymarsch	September 1958	Géza von Bolváry	Made in Austria
Stefanie	October 1958	Josef von Báky	
Embezzled Heaven	October 1958	Ernst Marischka	
Der Sündenbock von Spatzenhausen	October 1958	Herbert B. Fredersdorf	
Peter Voss, Thief of Millions	October 1958	Wolfgang Becker	
Laila	November 1958	Rolf Husberg	Co-production with Sweden
The House of Three Girls	December 1958	Ernst Marischka	
Kleine Leute mal ganz groß	December 1958	Herbert B. Fredersdorf	
As Long as the Heart Still Beats	December 1958	Alfred Weidenmann	
Scala – total verrückt	December 1958	Erik Ode	
Majestät auf Abwegen	December 1958	Robert A. Stemmle	
Schlag auf Schlag	January 1959	Géza von Cziffra	
Eva	February 1959	Rolf Thiele	Made in Austria
Mikosch of the Secret Service	February 1959	Franz Marischka	Made in Austria
Arena of Fear	February 1959	Arthur Maria Rabenalt	Made in Austria
Was eine Frau im Frühling träumt	February 1959	Erik Ode, Arthur Maria Rabenalt	
Freddy, the Guitar and the Sea	April 1959	Wolfgang Schleif	
The Head	July 1959	Victor Trivas	
Bobby Dodd greift ein	July 1959	Géza von Cziffra	
Liebe, Luft und lauter Lügen	August 1959	Peter Beauvais	
Jacqueline	September 1959	Wolfgang Liebeneine	
Labyrinth	September 1959	Rolf Thiele	
The Death Ship	October 1959	Georg Tressler	
Liebe verboten – Heiraten erlaubt	October 1959	Kurt Meisel	
Twelve Girls and One Man	October 1959	Hans Quest	Made in Austria
The Black Chapel	October 1959	Ralph Habib	
Paradise for Sailors	November 1959	Harald Reinl	
Adorable Arabella	December 1959	Axel von Ambesser	
Peter Voss, Hero of the Day	December 1959	Georg Marischka	
A Summer You Will Never Forget	December 1959	Werner Jacobs	
The Goose of Sedan	December 1959	Helmut Käutner	Co-production with France

== 1960s ==
Title	Release date	Director	Notes
Beloved Augustin	January 1960	Rolf Thiele	
...und noch frech dazu!	January 1960	Rolf von Sydow	
Boomerang	January 1960	Alfred Weidenmann	
Guitars Sound Softly Through the Night	February 1960	Hans Deppe	Made in Austria
Kein Engel ist so rein	February 1960	Wolfgang Becker	
The Juvenile Judge	February 1960	Paul Verhoeven	
Final Destination: Red Lantern	February 1960	Rudolf Jugert	
Freddy and the Melody of the Night	April 1960	Wolfgang Schlei	
Mistress of the World	April 1960	William Dieterle	
Hit Parade 1960	April 1960	Franz Marischka	
Ein Thron für Christine	June 1960	Luis César Amadori	
The True Jacob	August 1960	Rudolf Schündler	
Carnival Confession	September 1960	William Dieterle	
Stefanie in Rio	September 1960	Curtis Bernhardt	
The Thousand Eyes of Dr. Mabuse	September 1960	Fritz Lang	Co-production with France
Ingeborg	October 1960	Wolfgang Liebeneiner	
Tomorrow Is My Turn	October 1960	André Cayatte	Co-production with France
Schlager-Raketen	October 1960	Erik Ode	
Wegen Verführung Minderjähriger	November 1960	Hermann Leitner	Made in Austria
Willy the Private Detective	December 1960	Rudolf Schündler	
Und sowas nennt sich Leben	January 1961	Géza von Radványi	
Until Hell Is Frozen	February 1961	Leopold Lahola	
The Dead Eyes of London	March 1961	Alfred Vohrer	
Black Gravel	April 1961	Helmut Käutner	
One Prettier Than the Other	May 1961	Axel von Ambesser	
The Marriage of Mr. Mississippi	June 1961	Kurt Hoffmann	
Question 7	June 1961	Stuart Rosenberg	
The Transport	June 1961	Jürgen Roland	
Man nennt es Amore	June 1961	Rolf Thiele	
The Miracle of Father Malachia	July 1961	Bernhard Wicki	
The Devil's Daffodil	July 1961	Ákos Ráthonyi	Co-production with Britain
Der Hochtourist	August 1961	Ulrich Erfurth	
Man in the Shadows	August 1961	Arthur Maria Rabenalt	Made in Austria
A Star Fell from Heaven	September 1961	Géza von Cziffra	
The Cry of the Wild Geese	September 1961	Hans Heinrich	
Nur der Wind	September 1961	Fritz Umgelter	
Two Among Millions	October 1961	Wieland Liebske, Victor Vicas	
Barbara	November 1961	Frank Wisbar	
Auf Wiedersehen	December 1961	Harald Philipp	
Life Begins at Eight	January 1962	Michael Kehlmann	
Her Most Beautiful Day	April 1962	Paul Verhoeven	
Zwei blaue Vergissmeinnicht	August 1963	Helmuth M. Backhaus	

== See also ==
- List of Tobis Film films

== Bibliography ==
- Hardt, Ursula. From Caligari to California: Erich Pommer's Life in the International Film Wars. Berghahn Books, 1996.
- Kreimeier, Klaus. The Ufa Story: A History of Germany's Greatest Film Company, 1918-1945. University of California Press, 1999.
