= The Love Letters of Baroness S =

1924 film

- Directed by: Henrik Galeen
- Written by: Paul Reno; Henrik Galeen
- Produced by: Joe May
- Starring: Mia May; Memo Benassi
- Cinematography: Frederik Fuglsang; Ludwig Lippert; Giovanni Vitrotti
- Music by: Eduard Prasch
- Production company: May-Film
- Distributed by: UFA
- Release date: 15 December 1924
- Running time: 87 minutes
- Country: Germany
- Languages: Silent; German intertitles

The Love Letters of Baroness S (German: Liebesbriefe der Baronin von S...) is a 1924 German silent film directed by Henrik Galeen and starring Mia May and Memo Benassi.

The film's sets were designed by the art director Paul Leni. Location shooting took place around Rimini.

== Cast ==
- Mia May as Baronin von S.
- Alfredo Bertone as Baron von S.
- Memo Benassi as Straßenmusikant Giovanni
- Desdemona Mazza as Kokotte Jou-Jou - Ginetta
- Ernst Gronau as Marquis Grillon

== Bibliography ==
- Grange, William. Cultural Chronicle of the Weimar Republic. Scarecrow Press, 2008.
