= Hilde Warren und der Tod =

- Directed by: Joe May
- Screenplay by: Fritz Lang
- Produced by: Joe May
- Cinematography: Curt Courant
- Production company: May-Film
- Release date: August 31, 1917 (Berlin)
- Country: Germany

Hilde Warren und der Tod (Hilde Warren and Death) is a German film from 1917 by Joe May (director, born Joseph Otto Mandel) and Fritz Lang (screenplay). The title role of Hilde was played by Joe May's wife Mia May.

== Plot ==
Hilde Warren, a famous actress, is courted by the manager of her theatre. However, she rejects his proposal of marriage, wishing to devote herself entirely to her art. Death tries to tempt her, but she rejects him.

Soon after, she falls in love with handsome Roger Hector who carefully hides his association with the underworld. When the police comes to arrest him, he shoots at them and is killed. Shortly afterwards, Hilde discovers she is expecting a child by him. She is desperate and again Death appears to her, again to no avail.

Years pass and the vices of the father appear in her son Egon. The theatre manager is still willing to marry Hilde, but only if she abandons her child, a condition she can not accept. Hilde thinks she may be the cause of Egon's bad tendencies and again Death tempts her but she rejects the temptation.

When Egon becomes an adult and Hilde, who is almost ruined by his expensive tastes, refuses to give him more money, he turns into a criminal. Hunted by the police, he comes back to his mother to ask for money to run away. When she orders him to leave, threatening him with a revolver, he throws her on the ground and tries to steal her money. She shoots him in the back. Condemned to jail, she is again confronted by Death and this time welcomes him as a liberator.

== Cast ==
- Mia May: Hilde Warren
- Bruno Kastner: Hector Roger
- Hans Mierendorff: Intendant Wengraf
- Ernst Matray: Hilde's son Egon
- Georg John: Death
- Hermann Picha: Doctor
- Fritz Lang: old Priest

== Production ==
The film was Fritz Lang' first screenplay. It was shot in June 1917 and passed censorship the following month. The première was held in Berlin on 31 August 1917 and received very positive review in particular regarding the acting of Mia May and Georg John.

== Release ==
Hilde Warren und der Tod premiered in Berlin on August 31, 1917.
