= The Sin of Helga Arndt =

1916 film directed by Joe May

- German: Die Sünde der Helga Arndt
- Directed by: Joe May
- Written by: Joe May; William Kahn
- Produced by: Joe May
- Starring: Mia May; Theodor Burghardt; Frida Richard
- Production company: May-Film
- Release date: 28 January 1916
- Country: Germany
- Languages: Silent; German intertitles

The Sin of Helga Arndt (German: Die Sünde der Helga Arndt) is a 1916 German silent drama film directed by Joe May and starring Mia May, Theodor Burghardt and Frida Richard.

== Cast ==
- Mia May as Helga Arndt
- Theodor Burghardt as Engineer Berger
- Frida Richard as Helga's mother
- Hermann Wlach as Dr. Niklas, journalist
