= Marriage Announcement =

1926 film

- Directed by: Fritz Kaufmann
- Written by: Ruth Goetz
- Starring: Fritz Kampers; Max Landa; Hermann Picha
- Cinematography: Reimar Kuntze
- Production company: Transatlantische Film
- Distributed by: Deulig-Verleih
- Release date: February 1926
- Country: Germany
- Languages: Silent; German intertitles

Marriage Announcement (German: Heiratsannoncen) is a 1926 German silent film directed by Fritz Kaufmann and starring Fritz Kampers, Max Landa, and Hermann Picha.

== Plot ==
Werner and Käthe Mathes' marriage broke down due to a triviality, so Käthe, now divorced and on her own, must look for a job that promises her a secure income. She finds one in the house of the wealthy Mr. Rennfisch, where she is hired as a companion to the capricious daughter Ivonne. In this upstart's household, she must endure many humiliations and degradation.

The height of impudence, as Käthe sees it, is reached when, after failing to find a suitable husband for Ivonne through a marriage advertisement, Käthe's ex-husband, an attractive academic, is targeted. Käthe, who still loves her Werner, is naturally determined to prevent this. She succeeds, because one day Ivonne falls in love with the much older but very elegant and worldly-wise Legation Councilor Dr. von Sedlin. Werner, who never stopped loving his ex-wife, finds himself back with her after all sorts of turbulent back and forth.

== Cast ==
In alphabetical order

- Fritz Kampers
- Max Landa
- Hermann Picha
- Ellen Plessow
- Hanni Reinwald
- Else Reval
- Johannes Riemann
- Ruth Weyher

== Bibliography ==
- Krautz, Alfred (1984). International Directory of Cinematographers, Set- and Costume Designers in Film. Vol. 4. Munich: Saur. ISBN 978-3-598-21434-9.
