= The Platonic Marriage =

1919 film

- Directed by: Paul Leni
- Written by: Ruth Goetz; Richard Hutter; Joe May
- Produced by: Joe May
- Starring: Mia May; Georg Alexander; Albert Paulig
- Production company: May-Film
- Distributed by: UFA
- Release date: 31 January 1919
- Running time: 85 minutes
- Country: Germany
- Languages: Silent; German intertitles

The Platonic Marriage (German: Die platonische Ehe) is a 1919 German silent drama film directed by Paul Leni and starring Mia May, Georg Alexander and Albert Paulig. An impoverished nobleman marries a woman he finds unattractive simply to get his hands on her money. However, he gradually finds himself falling in love with her.

Leni also worked as art director, designing the film's sets.

== Cast ==
- Mia May
- Georg Alexander
- Albert Paulig
- Hermann Picha
- Ferry Sikla
- Kitty Dewall

== Bibliography ==
- Hans-Michael Bock & Michael Töteberg. Das Ufa-Buch. Zweitausendeins, 1992.
