= The Love of Hetty Raimond =

- Directed by: Joe May
- Written by: Joe May
- Produced by: Joe May
- Starring: Mia May; Bruno Decarli; Heinrich Peer
- Production company: May-Film
- Release date: 5 April 1917
- Country: Germany
- Languages: Silent; German intertitles

The Love of Hetty Raimond (German: Die Liebe von Hetty Raimond) is a 1917 German silent drama film directed by Mia May, Bruno Decarli and Heinrich Peer.

== Cast ==
- Mia May as Hetty Raymond
- Bruno Decarli as Hans van Gent
- Heinrich Peer as Dr. Jacques Seeberg
- Fritz Sachs as Werksleiter
- Emmy Flemmich

== Bibliography ==
- Jill Nelmes & Jule Selbo. Women Screenwriters: An International Guide. Palgrave Macmillan, 2015.
