= Sophus Wangøe =

Cinematography

- Born: 2 February 1873; Copenhagen, Denmark
- Died: 28 July 1943 (aged 70); Copenhagen, Denmark
- Occupation: Cinematographer
- Years active: 1912–1930 (film)

Sophus Wangøe (2 February 1873 – 28 July 1943) was a Danish cinematographer of the silent era.

== Selected filmography ==
- Towards the Light (1919)
- Ilona (1921)
- The Women of Gnadenstein (1921)
- The Passion of Inge Krafft (1921)
- The Inheritance of Tordis (1921)
- Tragedy of Love (1923)
- The Countess of Paris (1923)
- Zaida, the Tragedy of a Model (1923)
- Debit and Credit (1924)
- Thamar, The Child of the Mountains (1924)
- Anne-Liese of Dessau (1925)
- The Director General (1925)
- Lace (1926)
- The Great Duchess (1926)
- The Woman's Crusade (1926)
- The World Wants To Be Deceived (1926)
- Artists (1928)
- Luther (1928)

== Bibliography ==
- John T. Soister. Conrad Veidt on Screen: A Comprehensive Illustrated Filmography. McFarland, 2002.
