= The Beggar Countess =

1918 film

- German film poster
- German: Die Bettelgräfin
- Directed by: Joe May; Bruno Ziener
- Written by: Ruth Goetz; Joe May
- Produced by: Joe May
- Starring: Mia May; Heinrich Peer; Johannes Riemann
- Cinematography: Max Lutze
- Production company: May-Film
- Distributed by: UFA
- Release date: 29 November 1918
- Country: Germany
- Languages: Silent; German intertitles

The Beggar Countess (German: Die Bettelgräfin) is a 1918 German silent film directed by Joe May and Bruno Ziener and starring Mia May, Heinrich Peer, and Johannes Riemann.

== Cast ==
- Mia May as Ulla Dulters
- Heinrich Peer as Henryk van Deuwen
- Käthe Wittenberg as Stella van Deuwen
- Hermann Picha
- Hermann Seldeneck
- Theodor Burghard
- Johannes Riemann
