= The Guilt of Lavinia Morland =

1920 film directed by Joe May

- Directed by: Joe May
- Written by: Ernest Vajda (play); Wilhelm Auspitzer; Joe May
- Produced by: Joe May
- Starring: Mia May; Albert Steinrück; Alfred Gerasch
- Cinematography: Werner Brandes
- Production company: May-Film
- Distributed by: UFA
- Release date: 12 November 1920
- Running time: 129 minutes
- Country: Germany
- Languages: Silent; German intertitles

The Guilt of Lavinia Morland (German: Die Schuld der Lavinia Morland) is a 1920 German silent drama film directed by Joe May and starring Mia May, Albert Steinrück and Alfred Gerasch.

The film's sets were designed by the art director Erich Kettelhut, Paul Leni and Erich Zander.

== Cast ==
- Mia May as Lavinia Morland
- Albert Steinrück as John Morland
- Alfred Gerasch as Vicomte Gaston de Cardillac
- Paul Bildt as Harry Scott
- Loni Nest as Lavinias Kind
- Albert Patry as Dr. Harrison
- Otto Treptow as Diener
- Kitty Aschenbach
- Rosa Valetti

== Bibliography ==
- Parish, James Robert. Film Directors Guide: Western Europe. Scarecrow Press, 1976.
