= Georg John =

German actor (1879–1941)

- Born: Georg Jacobsohn; 23 July 1879; Schmiegel, Province of Posen, German Empire
- Died: 18 November 1941 (aged 62); Łódź Ghetto, Reichsgau Wartheland, Nazi Germany
- Occupation: Actor
- Years active: 1917–1933

Georg John (born Georg Jacobsohn; 23 July 1879 – 18 November 1941) was a German stage and film actor.

== Early life ==
Georg Jacobsohn was born into a Jewish household in Schmiegel, Province of Posen, Imperial Germany.

== Career ==
John began his career around 1900 in smaller stages and traveling theatres. In 1904, he was engaged at the Theater of Wilhelmshaven, followed by appearances at Stolp in 1905, Altona, Mülheim an der Ruhr, Bochum and Göttingen. In 1914, John worked as an actor and producer for Vaterländische Schauspiele in Vienna.

In 1917, John first appeared in silent movies, playing a Tibetan monk in Die Fremde (The Stranger), and Death in Hilde Warren und der Tod (Hilde Warren and Death). These roles were typical of the kinds of parts he would become known for, even if, at first, he was more often seen as a father, husband or dignitary. Beginning in the 1920s, John appeared in the films of notable German filmmakers, where he often played bizarre, gnome-like figures, such as the beggar in Fritz Lang's Der müde Tod (Tired Death, 1921, released in English as Destiny), and the blind balloon-seller who recognizes the murderer due to a whistled song in 1931's M. For F. W. Murnau he played a night-watchman in Der Letzte Mann (The Last Man, 1924, released in English as The Last Laugh).

Being a Jew, John was deported in autumn 1941 to the Łódź Ghetto where he died on 18 November 1941 at the age of 62.

== Selected filmography ==
- Ramara (1916)
- Hilde Warren und der Tod (1917) – Tod
- Die Fremde (1917)
- Das Buch des Lasters (1917) – Bildhauer
- Waves of Fate (1918)
- Mr. Wu (1918) – Tschang-Ta
- Verlorene Töchter (1918) – Manager Pichler
- Veritas Vincit (1919) – Blinder Senator
- Peer Gynt (1919, part 1, 2) – Prof. Dr. Begriffenfeldt
- The Boy in Blue (1919) – Zigeunerhauptmann / Gypsy commander
- The Spiders (1919–1920, part 1, 2) – Dr. Telphas
- Unheimliche Geschichten (1919)
- Harakiri (1919) – Buddhist Monk
- Phantome des Lebens (1919)
- Der Weg der Grete Lessen (1919, Short)
- Dämon der Welt (1920, part 2, 3) – Fred Osring
- Der Menschheit Anwalt (1920) – Hexenrichter Abdonatus / Hexenrichter Lucinder
- Johann Baptiste Lingg (1920) – Gutsverwalter Wolleck
- The Legend of Holy Simplicity (1920) – Blinder Bettler
- Der König von Paris (1920, part 1, 2)
- Humanity Unleashed (1920) – Fritz Breese
- Schatten einer Stunde (1920)
- Napoleon and the Little Washerwoman (1920)
- Hearts are Trumps (1920) – Dunkler mann
- Planetenschieber (1921)
- Tobias Buntschuh – Das Drama eines Einsamen (1921) – Abgesandte des Stahltrusts
- The Stranger from Alster Street (1921)
- Die Geschichte von Barak Johnson (1921)
- Der Silberkönig (1921, part 1-4)
- Der müde Tod (1921) – Beggar / Bettler
- The Riddle of the Sphinx (1921) – Mummy
- Lady Hamilton (1921) – zwei Jacobiner
- The Indian Tomb (1921, part 1, 2) – Büßer / a Penitent
- Das Geheimnis der Santa Maria (1921)
- Das Geheimnis der sechs Spielkarten (1921, part 4)
- Die Geschichte des grauen Hauses 1 – Episode: Der Mord aus verschmähter Liebe (1921)
- The Adventurer (1922) – der rote Johnny
- Die Beute der Erinnyen (1922) – Tom Sprang
- Der brennende Acker (1922) – Großknecht / Head farmhand
- Dr. Mabuse, der Spieler (1922) – Pesch
- She and the Three (1922) – Ehrenmann hinter schwedischen Gardinen
- Prashna's Secret (1922) – Praschna, indischer Fakir
- The Fall of Jerusalem (1922) – Egyptian Emissary
- Marie Antoinette, the Love of a King (1922) – Robespierre
- The Fire Ship (1922)
- The Stone Rider (1923) – Pförtner
- A Woman, an Animal, a Diamond (1923) – Zirkusdirektor
- The Lost Shoe (1923) – Jon
- I Had a Comrade (1923) – Marodeur
- The Good Comrade (1923) – Marodeur
- Gold and Luck (1923) – Wucherer
- Frauenschicksal (1924)
- Die Nibelungen (1924) – Mime the blacksmith / Alberich the Nibelung / Slaodel, his brother
- Decameron Nights (1924) – Astologer
- My Leopold (1924) – Nibisch
- Das Wachsfigurenkabinett (Waxworks) (1924) – Prisoner
- The Last Laugh (1924) – Nachtwächter [Night Watchman]
- Peter the Pirate (1925) – Beppo
- Harry Hill's Deadly Hunt (1925, part 1, 2)
- Guillotine (1925)
- Express Train of Love (1925)
- Slums of Berlin (1925) – Laundress's Husband
- The Gentleman Without a Residence (1925) – Fürst
- Varieté (1925) – Seeman
- Bismarck (1925, part 1)
- The Hanseatics (1925)
- Adventure on the Night Express (1925) – Theewens Diener Raoul
- The Fallen (1926) – Schampuspusorje
- The Mill at Sanssouci (1926) – General Zieten
- Des Königs Befehl (1926)
- Eyes Open, Harry! (1926) – Nathan Miller
- Das graue Haus (1926) – Der Henker
- Hell of Love (1926) – Heinicke, Prokurist
- The Flight in the Night (1926) – Bediensteter
- Wenn Menschen irren. Frauen auf Irrwegen (1926)
- Metropolis (1927) – Arbeiter / Working Man Who Causes Explosion of M-Machine (uncredited)
- Erinnerungen einer Nonne (1927)
- The Bordellos of Algiers (1927) – Portier
- The Weavers (1927) – Ansorge
- Frühere Verhältnisse (1927)
- Gehetzte Frauen (1927)
- The Curse of Vererbung (1927) – Portier
- At the Edge of the World (1927)
- Der Mann ohne Kopf (1927) – Der Schreckliche
- Petronella – Das Geheimnis der Berge (1927) – Der alte Amros
- Only a Viennese Woman Kisses Like That (1928) – Der Manager
- Alraune (1928) – Der Mörder
- Luther (1928) – Ein Krüppel
- Panic (1928)
- Spione (1928) – Locomotive Engineer (uncredited)
- Man Against Man (1928) – Zamok
- The Hangman (1928)
- Volga Volga (1928)
- Anastasia, die falsche Zarentochter (1928)
- Somnambul (1929) – Der Wirt
- Taxi at Midnight (1929) – Dritter Wachtmeister
- Men Without Work (1929) – Odysseus – der 'Künstler
- Andreas Hofer (1929) – Franz Raffl – ein Bauer
- Atlantik (1929) – Wendt, Thomas' servant
- The Woman Without Nerves (1930) – Sekretär
- Fundvogel (1930) – Poacher
- Rag Ball (1930)
- The Land of Smiles (1930) – Tschang in der Operette
- The Flute Concert of Sanssouci (1930) – Zieten
- Danton (1931) – Ankläger
- Stürmisch die Nacht (1931)
- M (1931) – Blind Panhandler
- The First Right of the Child (1932)
- Death Over Shanghai (1932) – Lutsin – Praxas Diener
- F.P.1 antwortet nicht (1932) – Maschinist
- The Flower of Hawaii (1933) – Oberpriester von Hawaii
- Jumping Into the Abyss (1933) – Fotograf
- The Testament of Dr. Mabuse (1933) – Baums Diener / Baum's Servant (final film role)
