= The Duke of Aleria =

1923 film

- Directed by: Heinz Schall
- Written by: Fanny Carlsen
- Starring: Johannes Riemann; Lina Lossen; Erich Kaiser-Titz
- Cinematography: Hans Bloch
- Production company: Koop-Film
- Release date: 1923
- Country: Germany
- Languages: Silent; German intertitles

The Duke of Aleria (German:Der Herzog von Aleria) is a 1923 German silent film directed by Heinz Schall and starring Johannes Riemann, Lina Lossen and Erich Kaiser-Titz.

The film's art direction was by Karl Machus.

== Cast ==
- Johannes Riemann as Herzog Vinzenz von Aleria
- Lina Lossen as Herzogin Maria
- Erich Kaiser-Titz as Herms van Rosen
- Philipp Manning as Prälat Ruspoli
- Claire Rommer as Dolan Fay
- Yuri Yurovsky as Hausarzt Dr. Antony
- Johanna Zimmermann as Dita Roland
