= The Rat (1918 film) =

- Directed by: Joe May; Harry Piel
- Written by: Richard Hutter; Harry Piel; Philipp Silber
- Produced by: Joe May
- Starring: Heinrich Schroth; Olga Engl; Käthe Haack
- Cinematography: Max Lutze
- Production company: May-Film
- Distributed by: UFA
- Release date: 11 October 1918
- Country: Germany
- Languages: Silent; German intertitles

The Rat (German: Die Ratte) is a 1918 German silent crime film directed by Harry Piel and Joe May and starring Heinrich Schroth, Olga Engl and Käthe Haack. It was part of the series of Joe Deebs detective films.

It was shot at the Tempelhof Studios in Berlin.

== Cast ==
- Heinrich Schroth as Joe Deebs, Detektiv
- Olga Engl as Fürstin Klankenstein
- Stefan Vacano as Baron Bassano
- Lina Paulsen as Gräfin Dürfeld
- Mechthildis Thein as Baronin Orlowska
- Leo Burg as Grauhofer
- Hermann Picha as Vinzenz Krüger, Domtürmer
- Werner Albes as Dr. Hans Krüger
- Käthe Haack as Die Ratte

== Bibliography ==
- Bock, Hans-Michael & Bergfelder, Tim. The Concise CineGraph. Encyclopedia of German Cinema. Berghahn Books, 2009.
