= The Armoured Vault =

1926 film

- Directed by: Lupu Pick
- Written by: Lupu Pick; Curt J. Braun
- Produced by: Lupu Pick
- Starring: Ernst Reicher; Johannes Riemann; Mary Nolan
- Cinematography: Gustave Preiss
- Music by: Jos von Streletzky
- Production company: Rex-Film
- Distributed by: UFA
- Release date: 30 December 1926
- Country: Germany
- Languages: Silent; German intertitles

The Armoured Vault (German: Das Panzergewölbe) is a 1926 German silent thriller film directed by Lupu Pick and starring Ernst Reicher, Johannes Riemann, and Mary Nolan. It was part of a popular series featuring the detective character Stuart Webbs, and a remake of an earlier film The Armoured Vault directed by Joe May in 1914.

The film's sets were designed by Rudi Feld. It was shot at the Staaken Studios in Berlin.

== Cast ==
- Ernst Reicher as Stuart Webbs
- Johannes Riemann as Elgin
- Mary Nolan as Ellen, Frau Elgin (billed as Imogene Robertson)
- Heinrich George as Cracker
- Aud Egede-Nissen as Ronna
- Sig Arno as Sandy
- Max Gülstorff as Craigh
- Hugo Fischer-Köppe as Bobby
- Julius E. Herrmann as Der Dicke
- Hadrian Maria Netto as Der Elegante
- Erich Kaiser-Titz as Der Brutale
- Paul Rehkopf as Der Künstler
- Fritz Rulard as Der Ingenieur
- Louis Brody as Der Chauffeur (as Lewis Brody)
- Ernst Behmer as Diener
- Artur Retzbach as 1. Untersuchungsrichter
- Julius Falkenstein as 2. Untersuchingsrichter
- Jakob Tiedtke as 3. Untersuchungsrichter
- Geza L. Weiss as Radfahrer

== Bibliography ==
- Thompson, Kristin (2005). Herr Lubitsch Goes to Hollywood: German and American Film After World War I. Amsterdam: Amsterdam University Press. ISBN 978-90-5356-708-1.
