= Johannes Riemann =

German actor

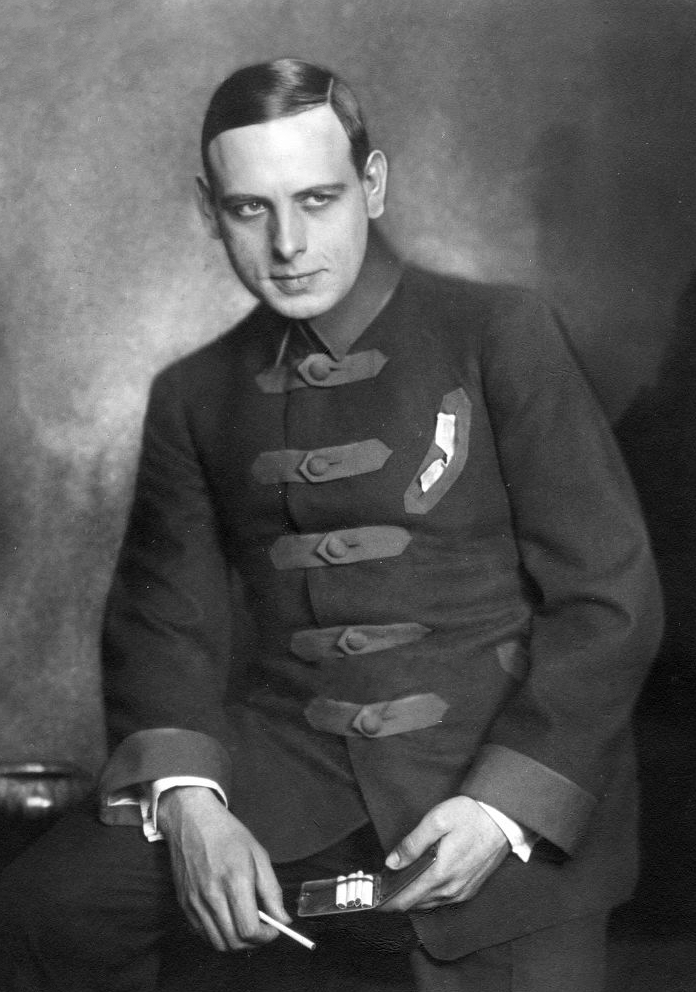
- Johannes Riemann by Nicola Perscheid.
- Born: 31 May 1888; Berlin, Prussia, German Empire
- Died: 30 September 1959 (aged 71); Konstanz, Baden-Württemberg, West Germany
- Occupations: Actor, Director, Writer
- Years active: 1916–1957 (film)

Johannes Riemann (31 May 1888 – 30 September 1959) was a German actor and film director. Riemann was a member of the Nazi Party.

== Selected filmography ==
- The Giant's Fist (1917)
- Five Minutes Too Late (1918)
- The Beggar Countess (1918)
- Your Big Secret (1918)
- Anna Karenina (1919)
- The Commandment of Love (1919)
- Veritas Vincit (1919)
- Irrlicht (1919)
- The Enchanted Princess (1919)
- The Clan (1920)
- Kri-Kri, the Duchess of Tarabac (1920)
- Nobody Knows (1920)
- Sappho (1921)
- The Eternal Struggle (1921)
- The Three Aunts (1921)
- Count Varenne's Lover (1921)
- Trix, the Romance of a Millionairess (1921)
- The Anthem of Love (1922)
- The Circle of Death (1922)
- The Love Story of Cesare Ubaldi (1922)
- William Tell (1923)
- Der Herzog von Aleria (1923)
- Count Cohn (1923)
- The Men of Sybill (1923)
- The Treasure of Gesine Jacobsen (1923)
- The City Without Jews (1924)
- Prater (1924)
- The Morals of the Alley (1925)
- The Elegant Bunch (1925)
- Rags and Silk (1925)
- The Golden Calf (1925)
- The Young Man from the Ragtrade (1926)
- We'll Meet Again in the Heimat (1926)
- Marriage Announcement (1926)
- The Armoured Vault (1926)
- Bigamie (1927)
- Valencia (1927)
- The Woman on the Rack (1928)
- Miss Chauffeur (1928)
- The Wrong Husband (1931)
- Such a Greyhound (1931)
- My Heart Longs for Love (1931)
- Love at First Sight (1932)
- Wrong Number, Miss (1932)
- Maid Happy (1933)
- The Gentleman from Maxim's (1933)
- Grand Duchess Alexandra (1933)
- Police Report (1934)
- Eva (1935)
- The Man with the Paw (1935)
- Doctor Engel (1936)
- The Day After the Divorce (1938)
- All Lies (1938)
- Yvette (1938)
- Renate in the Quartet (1939)
- Her First Experience (1939)
- Marriage in Small Doses (1939)
- Bel Ami (1939)
- Everything for Gloria (1941)
- Friedemann Bach (1941)
- The Little Residence (1942)
- A Man for My Wife (1943)
- Beloved Darling (1943)
- The Song of the Nightingale (1944)
- Two Bavarians in the Harem (1957)

== Bibliography ==
- Jung, Uli & Schatzberg, Walter. Beyond Caligari: The Films of Robert Wiene. Berghahn Books, 1999.
