= Mia May =

Austrian actress (1884–1980)

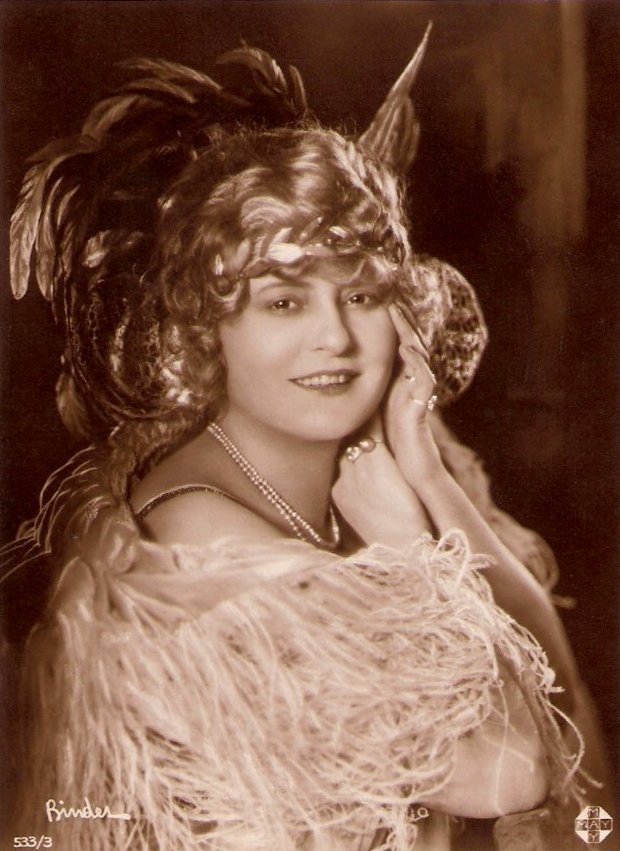
- Born: Hermine Pfleger; 2 June 1884; Vienna, Austria-Hungary
- Died: 28 November 1980 (aged 96); Los Angeles, California, U.S.
- Other name: Herma Angelot
- Occupation: Actress
- Years active: 1889–1924
- Spouse: Joe May (m. 1902; died 1954)
- Children: Eva May

Signature
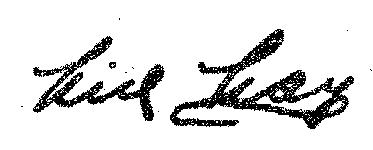

Mia May (born Hermine Pfleger; 2 June 1884 – 28 November 1980) was an Austrian actress. She was married to the Austrian film producer and director Joe May and appeared in 44 films between 1912 and 1924. Her daughter was the actress Eva May.

== Biography ==
Mia May was born Hermine Pfleger on 2 June 1884 in Vienna, the daughter of Johann Pfleger, a baker, and Albine Pfleger (née. Steinfelder). Her older sister, Maria (1879–1958), who acted under the stage name Mitzi Telmont, was the second wife of the comedian Heinrich Eisenbach.

She made her stage debut at Jantsch Theater at the age of 5, playing child roles until she was 14. She continued her stage career as a teenager, taking on the stage name Herma Angelot, and appearing at the Apollo Theater as an actress and singer. While attending high school, she began receiving ballet lessons from Louise Übermasser.

In 1902, she married Joseph Otto Mandl, and seven weeks later gave birth to their daughter Eva Maria Mandl. Herma Angelot then became Mia May, and when her husband entered the film business, he took on the name Joe May.

In 1911, May traveled to Hamburg to Wilhelm Bendiner's Neues Operettentheater. In 1912, the May family settled in Berlin, where her husband had been hired as a film director. She made her film debut in In der Tiefe des Schachtes (1912), which her husband directed, followed by the 1913 short Life's Temptations, and Die geheimnisvolle Villa (1914), which was also their daughter Eva May's film debut.

In 1915, Joe May founded the film company May-Film Gmb, which Mia May became managing director of. She is also credited with writing Your Big Secret (1918).

May appeared in films such as Hilde Warren und der Tod (1917), which was written by Fritz Lang, The Beggar Countess (1918), The Platonic Marriage (1919), Veritas Vincit (1919), and Tragedy of Love (1923) with Emil Jannings and a young Marlene Dietrich. May said of Dietrich, "I remember her as very funny and engaging, attractive and original. No man could resist her. She went everywhere with a monocle and a boa of five red foxes. On other occasions, she would wear a wolf fur throw. People would follow her in the streets, they would laugh at her, but she fascinated them."

From 1919 to 1920, she starred in the 8 part film serial Mistress of the World. For a time, she was as popular as actresses Asta Nielsen, Henny Porten, and Pola Negri.

May's final screen appearance was in The Love Letters of Baroness S (1924). She retired in 1924 after her daughter Eva May committed suicide.

Upon the rise of the Nazis in 1933, Mia May and Joe May emigrated to America via France. In 1949, Mia and Joe opened the Blue Danube restaurant in Los Angeles, but it was unsuccessful, and closed shortly after. Previously, Joe May had opened the Wiener Bar in Hollywood in 1937.

Mia May died on 28 November 1980 in Los Angeles.

== Selected filmography ==
- Die geheimnisvolle Villa (1914)
- The Sin of Helga Arndt (1916)
- The Love of Hetty Raimond (1917)
- Hilde Warren und der Tod (1917)
- Five Minutes Too Late (1918)
- The Sacrifice (1918)
- The Beggar Countess (1918)
- Your Big Secret (1918)
- Waves of Fate (1918)
- The Platonic Marriage (1919)
- Veritas Vincit (1919)
- The Mistress of the World (1919, 8 parts)
- The Wandering Image (1920)
- The Guilt of Lavinia Morland (1920)
- The Passion of Inge Krafft (1921)
- The Indian Tomb (1921)
- The Countess of Paris (1923)
- The Love Letters of Baroness S (1924)
