= The Armoured Vault (1914 film) =

1914 film directed by Joe May

- Directed by: Joe May
- Written by: Joe May; Ernst Reicher; Arzén von Cserépy
- Starring: Ernst Reicher; Hermann Picha; Fritz Richard
- Cinematography: Max Fassbender
- Production company: Stuart Webbs-Film
- Release date: 26 June 1914
- Running time: 60 minutes
- Country: Germany
- Languages: Silent; German intertitles

The Armoured Vault (German: Das Panzergewölbe) is a 1914 German silent thriller film directed by Joe May and starring Ernst Reicher, Hermann Picha and Fritz Richard. It was one of the Stuart Webbs detective series, popular during the silent era.

The film's sets were designed by the art director Paul Leni.

It was produced by the newly-formed 'Stuart Webbs-Film Reicher und Reicher' company, and shot at Continental-Kunstfilm's studios.

It was remade in 1926 with Reicher reprising his role.

== Cast ==
- Ernst Reicher as Stuart Webbs
- Hermann Picha
- Fritz Richard
- Arthur Ullmann

== Bibliography ==
- Wlaschin, Ken (2009). Silent Mystery and Detective Movies: A Comprehensive Filmography. Jefferson, NC: McFarland. ISBN 978-0-7864-4350-5.
