= Hermann Picha =

German actor (1865–1936)

- Born: Hermann August Karl Picher; 20 March 1865; Charlottenburg, Kingdom of Prussia
- Died: 7 June 1936 (aged 71); Berlin, Nazi Germany
- Occupations: Film actor Stage actor
- Years active: 1914–1935

Hermann Picha (20 March 1865 – 7 June 1936) was a German stage and film actor. Picha was extremely prolific, appearing in over 300 short and feature films during the silent and early sound eras. Picha played a mixture of lead and supporting roles during his career. He played the title role in the 1920 film Wibbel the Tailor, directed by Manfred Noa. He appeared in Fritz Lang's Destiny.

== Selected filmography ==
- The Armoured Vault (1914)
- Hilde Warren und der Tod (1917)
- The Princess of Neutralia (1917)
- Wedding in the Eccentric Club (1917)
- The Beggar Countess (1918)
- Five Minutes Too Late (1918)
- The Rat (1918)
- Your Big Secret (1918)
- The Commandment of Love (1919)
- Veritas Vincit (1919)
- The Derby (1919)
- State Attorney Jordan (1919)
- The Golden Lie (1919)
- The Woman at the Crossroads (1919)
- Irrlicht (1919)
- The Platonic Marriage (1919)
- The Bodega of Los Cuerros (1919)
- In the Whirl of Life (1920)
- Mascotte (1920)
- From the Files of a Respectable Woman (1920)
- Romeo and Juliet in the Snow (1920)
- President Barrada (1920)
- Kri-Kri, the Duchess of Tarabac (1920)
- Wibbel the Tailor (1920)
- A Day on Mars (1921)
- Seafaring Is Necessary (1921)
- The Island of the Lost (1921)
- Memoirs of a Film Actress (1921)
- The Golden Plague (1921)
- The Inheritance of Tordis (1921)
- The Riddle of the Sphinx (1921)
- Hashish, the Paradise of Hell (1921)
- Destiny (1921)
- Peter Voss, Thief of Millions (1921)
- The Stranger from Alster Street (1921)
- The Love Corridor (1921)
- The Hotel of the Dead (1921)
- The Big Thief (1922)
- The Queen of Whitechapel (1922)
- The Cigarette Countess (1922)
- The Shadows of That Night (1922)
- Bigamy (1922)
- To the Ladies' Paradise (1922)
- Miss Rockefeller Is Filming (1922)
- The Love Nest (1922)
- The Lady and Her Hairdresser (1922)
- The Curse of Silence (1922)
- The Lost House (1922)
- Lumpaci the Vagabond (1922)
- Lola Montez, the King's Dancer (1922)
- Sunken Worlds (1922)
- The Treasure of Gesine Jacobsen (1923)
- Black Earth (1923)
- The Ravine of Death (1923)
- Time Is Money (1923)
- The Beautiful Girl (1923)
- Adam and Eve (1923)
- The Man Without Nerves (1924)
- The Little Duke (1924)
- Darling of the King (1924)
- The Heart of Lilian Thorland (1924)
- Playing with Destiny (1924)
- Gobseck (1924)
- Debit and Credit (1924)
- Arabella (1924)
- Father Voss (1925)
- The Man Who Sold Himself (1925)
- Three Waiting Maids (1925)
- The Elegant Bunch (1925)
- The Company Worth Millions (1925)
- Old Mamsell's Secret (1925)
- Ballettratten (1925)
- The City of Temptation (1925)
- The Woman with That Certain Something (1925)
- In the Valleys of the Southern Rhine (1925)
- Nick, King of the Chauffeurs (1925)
- The Old Ballroom (1925)
- Comedians (1925)
- Flight Around the World (1925)
- Passion (1925)
- The Venus of Montmartre (1925)
- If You Have an Aunt (1925)
- The Morals of the Alley (1925)
- The King and the Girl (1925)
- Oh Those Glorious Old Student Days (1925)
- Bismarck (1925)
- People to Each Other (1926)
- The Ones Down There (1926)
- Gretchen Schubert (1926)
- The Boxer's Bride (1926)
- I Liked Kissing Women (1926)
- The Bank Crash of Unter den Linden (1926)
- Department Store Princess (1926)
- Only a Dancing Girl (1926)
- Vienna, How it Cries and Laughs (1926)
- Love's Joys and Woes (1926)
- When I Came Back (1926)
- Women of Passion (1926)
- The Circus of Life (1926)
- The Pride of the Company (1926)
- Fadette (1926)
- Maytime (1926)
- Marriage Announcement (1926)
- Annemarie and Her Cavalryman (1926)
- The Prince and the Dancer (1926)
- The White Horse Inn (1926)
- Manon Lescaut (1926)
- Tartuffe (1926)
- Darling, Count the Cash (1926)
- The Captain from Koepenick (1926)
- The Schimeck Family (1926)
- The Fallen (1926)
- Why Get a Divorce? (1926)
- Circus Romanelli (1926)
- The Tales of Hermann (1926)
- The Three Mannequins (1926)
- The Young Man from the Ragtrade (1926)
- Dancing Vienna (1927)
- Poor Little Colombine (1927)
- Marie's Soldier (1927)
- The Woman Who Couldn't Say No (1927)
- A Crazy Night (1927)
- Excluded from the Public (1927)
- A Girl of the People (1927)
- On the Banks of the River Weser (1927)
- The Imaginary Baron (1927)
- Behind the Altar (1927)
- German Women - German Faithfulness (1927)
- The Awakening of Woman (1927)
- Weekend Magic (1927)
- The Girl from Abroad (1927)
- Rinaldo Rinaldini (1927)
- Svengali (1927)
- The Master of Nuremberg (1927)
- The Pink Slippers (1927)
- Circle of Lovers (1927)
- The Transformation of Dr. Bessel (1927)
- Rhenish Girls and Rhenish Wine (1927)
- The Weavers (1927)
- The Convicted (1927)
- The Market of Life (1928)
- The Green Alley (1928)
- Prince or Clown (1928)
- The Insurmountable (1928)
- Suzy Saxophone (1928)
- Lemke's Widow (1928)
- Cry for Help (1928)
- Autumn on the Rhine (1928)
- Secrets of the Orient (1928)
- The Lady in Black (1928)
- Children's Tragedy (1928)
- Robert and Bertram (1928)
- It's You I Have Loved (1929)
- Tempo! Tempo! (1929)
- The Black Domino (1929)
- The Circus Princess (1929)
- Youth of the Big City (1929)
- Sinful and Sweet (1929)
- Queen of Fashion (1929)
- Foolish Happiness (1929)
- Gentlemen Among Themselves (1929)
- Danube Waltz (1930)
- The Fate of Renate Langen (1931)
- Circus Life (1931)
- Errant Husbands (1931)
- Such a Greyhound (1931)
- A Crafty Youth (1931)
- The Beggar Student (1931)
- Man Without a Name (1932)
- A Tremendously Rich Man (1932)
- The Escape to Nice (1932)
- Two Lucky Days (1932)
- Haunted People (1932)
- Paprika (1932)
- Mother and Child (1934)
- The World Without a Mask (1934)
- Don't Lose Heart, Suzanne! (1935)

== Bibliography ==
- Kreimeier, Klaus. The Ufa Story: A History of Germany's Greatest Film Company, 1918-1945. University of California Press, 1999.
- Prawer, S.S. Between Two Worlds: The Jewish Presence in German and Austrian Film, 1910-1933. Berghahn Books, 2005.
- Usai, Paolo Cherchi. Before Caligari: German cinema, 1895-1920. University of Wisconsin Press, 1991.
