= Veritas Vincit (film) =

- Directed by: Joe May
- Written by: Ruth Goetz; Richard Hutter; Joe May; Michelangelo Baron Zois
- Produced by: Joe May
- Starring: Mia May; Johannes Riemann; Magnus Stifter
- Cinematography: Max Lutze
- Music by: Ferdinand Hummel
- Production company: May-Film
- Distributed by: UFA
- Release date: 4 April 1919
- Running time: 127 minutes
- Country: Germany
- Languages: Silent; German intertitles

Veritas Vincit is a 1919 German silent historical film directed by Joe May and starring Mia May, Johannes Riemann, and Magnus Stifter. It was made as an epic in three episodes, similar to D. W. Griffith's Intolerance. The first takes place in Ancient Rome, the second during the Renaissance and the third shortly before the First World War. Although not released until Spring 1919, it had been made during the final months of the war the previous year.

The film's sets were designed by the art directors Paul Leni and Siegfried Wroblewsky. It was shot at the Weissensee Studios in Berlin and on location around the city.

== Cast ==
- Mia May as Helena / Ellinor / Komtessa Helene
- Johannes Riemann as Lucfius / Ritter Lutz von Ehrenfried / Prinz Ludwig
- Magnus Stifter as Decius
- Emil Albes as Flavius
- Wilhelm Diegelmann as Tullulus
- Ferry Sikla as Fucius Asinius
- Paul Biensfeldt as Digulus
- Georg John as Blinder Senator
- Leopold Bauer as Meister Heinrich, der Goldschmied
- Lina Paulsen as Ursula
- Friedrich Kühne as Florian
- Bernhard Goetzke as Inder
- Adolf Klein as Fürst
- Olga Engl as Fürstin
- Joseph Klein as General von der Tanne
- Max Laurence as Untersuchungsrichter
- Anders Wikman as Vicomte Rene de Montmorte
- Hermann Picha as Zauberin
- Emmy Wyda
- Maria Forescu
- Max Gülstorff as Wilddieb

== Bibliography ==
- Hake, Sabine. German National Cinema. Routledge, 2002.
- Kreimeier, Klaus. The UFA Story: A Story of Germany's Greatest Film Company 1918-1945. University of California Press, 1999.
