= Five Minutes Too Late =

- Directed by: Uwe Jens Krafft
- Written by: Rudolf Baron; Joe May
- Produced by: Joe May
- Starring: Mia May; Johannes Riemann; Bruno Kastner
- Cinematography: Max Lutze
- Production company: May-Film
- Distributed by: UFA
- Release date: 6 September 1918
- Running time: 57 minutes
- Country: Germany
- Languages: Silent; German intertitles

Five Minutes Too Late (German: Fünf Minuten zu spät) is a 1918 German silent thriller film directed by Uwe Jens Krafft and starring Mia May, Johannes Riemann and Bruno Kastner.

== Cast ==
- Mia May as Jana Vermöhlen
- Johannes Riemann as Reinhold
- Bruno Kastner
- Grete Diercks
- Hermann Picha
- Frau Pütz

== Bibliography ==
- Alfred Krautz. International directory of cinematographers, set- and costume designers in film, Volume 4. Saur, 1984.
