= Express Train of Love =

1925 film directed by Johannes Guter

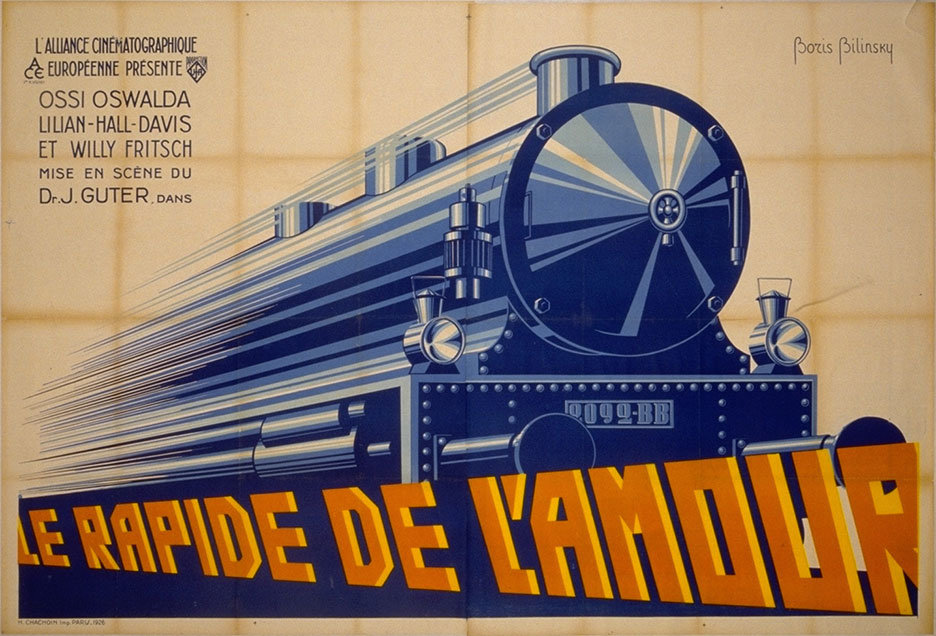
- Poster by Boris Bilinsky
- Directed by: Johannes Guter
- Written by: Karl Hans Strobl (novella); Robert Liebmann
- Produced by: Erich Pommer
- Starring: Ossi Oswalda; Willy Fritsch; Lillian Hall-Davis; Nigel Barrie
- Cinematography: Carl Hoffmann
- Production company: UFA
- Distributed by: UFA
- Release date: 6 May 1925
- Country: Germany
- Languages: Silent; German intertitles

Express Train of Love (German: Blitzzug der Liebe) is a 1925 German silent comedy film directed by Johannes Guter and starring Ossi Oswalda, Willy Fritsch and Lillian Hall-Davis. It premiered on 6 May 1925 at the Ufa-Palast am Zoo in Berlin.

The film's art direction was by Rudi Feld.

== Cast ==
- Ossi Oswalda as Kitty
- Willy Fritsch as Charley
- Lillian Hall-Davis as Lissi
- Nigel Barrie as Fred
- Jenny Jugo as Sportslady
- Ernst Hofmann as Redakteur
- Josefine Dora
- Karl Platen
- Werner Westerholt
- Henry Bender
- Georg John
- Hans Junkermann
- Hans Oberländer
- Philipp Manning

== Bibliography ==
- Hardt, Ursula. From Caligari to California: Erich Pommer's life in the International Film Wars. Berghahn Books, 1996.
- Kreimeier, Klaus. The Ufa Story: A History of Germany's Greatest Film Company, 1918-1945. University of California Press, 1999.
