= Tragedy of Love =

1923 film

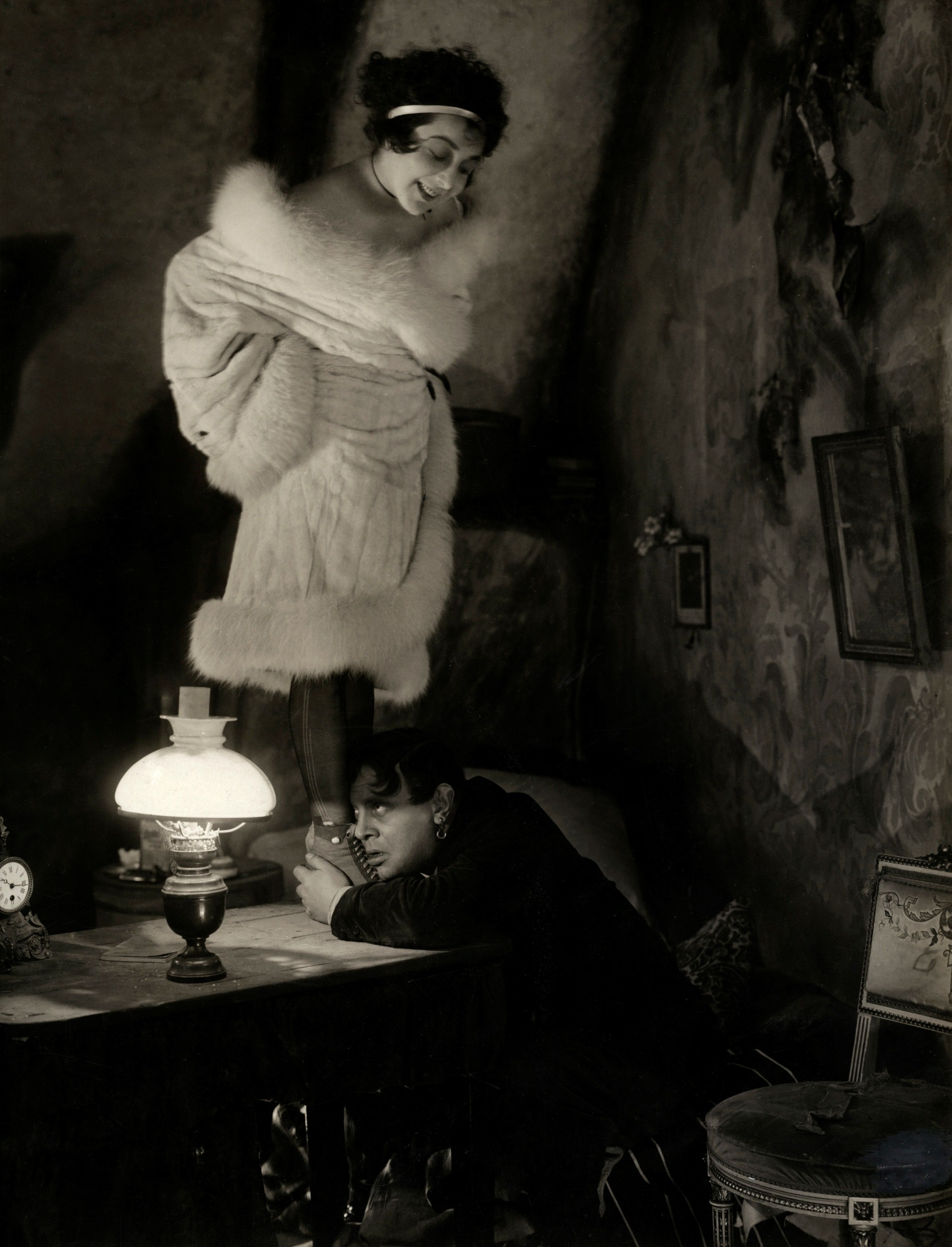
- German: Tragödie der Liebe
- Directed by: Joe May
- Written by: Leo Birinsky; Adolf Lantz
- Produced by: Rudolf Sieber; Joe May
- Starring: Mia May; Emil Jannings; Marlene Dietrich
- Cinematography: Karl Platen; Sophus Wangøe
- Music by: Wilhelm Löwitt
- Production company: May-Film
- Distributed by: UFA
- Release date: 21 September 1923
- Country: Germany
- Languages: Silent; German intertitles

Tragedy of Love (German: Tragödie der Liebe) is a 1923 German silent film directed by Joe May and starring Mia May, Emil Jannings and Marlene Dietrich.

The film's sets were designed by the art directors Erich Kettelhut, Paul Leni and Erich Zander.

== Cast ==
In alphabetical order

- Lena Amsel
- Charlotte Ander
- Irmgard Bern as Yvonne
- Paul Biensfeldt
- Marlene Dietrich as Lucy
- Rudolf Forster as Francois Moreau
- Vladimir Gajdarov as André Rabatin
- Karl Gerhardt
- Erika Glässner as Musette
- Curt Goetz as Prosecutor
- Paul Graetz
- Ernst Gronau
- Guido Herzfeld as Marcel
- Emil Jannings as Ombrade
- Arnold Korff as Det. Henry Beaufort
- Hans Kuhnert
- Rudolf Lettinger
- Mia May as Manon Moreau
- Loni Nest as Kitty als Kind
- Albert Patry
- Hedwig Pauly-Winterstein as Adrienne Moreau
- Eugen Rex as Jean
- Fritz Richard
- Ferry Sikla
- Hermann Vallentin as Commissioner
- Kurt Vespermann as Senior Prosecutor
- Hertha von Walther
- Hans Wassmann
- Ida Wüst as Madame de la Roqère

== See also ==
- The Countess of Paris (1923)
