= The Sacrifice (1918 film) =

- Directed by: Joe May
- Written by: Joe May
- Produced by: Joe May
- Starring: Mia May; Harry Liedtke; Anton Edthofer
- Cinematography: Curt Courant
- Production company: May-Film
- Distributed by: UFA
- Release date: 10 May 1918
- Country: Germany
- Languages: Silent; German intertitles

The Sacrifice (German: Das Opfer) is a 1918 German silent drama film written, directed and produced by Joe May and starring his wife Mia May, Harry Liedtke and Anton Edthofer.

== Cast ==
- Mia May as Maria
- Fritz Westfried
- Anton Edthofer
- Ernst Dernburg
- Elga Hess
- Hans Mierendorff
- Harry Liedtke
- Maria West
- Lina Paulsen

== Bibliography ==
- Hans-Michael Bock & Claudia Lenssen. Joe May: Regisseur und Produzent. 1991.
