= Father Voss =

1925 film directed by Max Mack

- Directed by: Max Mack
- Written by: Robert Liebmann; Max Mack; Rudolf Meinert
- Produced by: Rudolf Meinert
- Starring: Stewart Rome; Mary Odette; Lotte Stein; Robert Garrison
- Cinematography: Otto Kanturek
- Production company: Internationale Film AG
- Distributed by: UFA
- Release date: 17 April 1925
- Country: Germany
- Languages: Silent; German intertitles

Father Voss (German: Vater Voss) is a 1925 German silent comedy film directed by Max Mack and starring Stewart Rome, Mary Odette and Lotte Stein. It was one of a number of dramas released by UFA alongside its more prestigious art films. In common with German practice at the time, two British stars were imported to add international appeal.

The film's art direction was by Robert A. Dietrich.

== Cast ==
- Stewart Rome as William Voß
- Mary Odette as Gerti
- Lotte Stein as Mutter des William Voß
- Robert Garrison as Prosecutor
- Rudolf Esk as Prokurist
- Albert Paul as Senatspräsident
- Hermann Picha as Zuverlässiger Herr
- Arthur Pusey as Robert
- Otto Reinwald as Bob
- Berthold Rose as Blinder
- F.W. Schröder-Schrom as Bankier Holson
- Franz Schönfeld as Untersuchungsrichter
- Jenny Steiner as Frau von Welt
- Aruth Wartan as Individuum

== Bibliography ==
- Kreimeier, Klaus. The Ufa Story: A History of Germany's Greatest Film Company, 1918-1945. University of California Press, 1999.
