= The Countess of Paris =

1923 German film

- German: Die Gräfin von Paris
- Directed by: Dimitri Buchowetzki; Joe May
- Written by: Leo Birinsky; Adolf Lantz
- Produced by: Joe May
- Starring: Mia May; Emil Jannings; Erika Glässner
- Cinematography: Karl Puth; Sophus Wangøe
- Music by: Wilhelm Löwitt
- Production company: May-Film
- Distributed by: UFA
- Release date: 12 October 1923
- Country: Germany
- Languages: Silent; German intertitles

The Countess of Paris (German: Die Gräfin von Paris) is a 1923 German silent film directed by Dimitri Buchowetzki and Joe May and starring Mia May, Emil Jannings and Erika Glässner. It was the sequel to Tragedy of Love.

The film's sets were designed by the art director Paul Leni.

== Cast ==
- Mia May as Gräfin Manon Moreau
- Emil Jannings as Ombrade
- Erika Glässner as Musette
- Vladimir Gajdarov as André Rabatin
- Charlotte Ander as Kitty Moreau
- Irmgard Bern as Yvonne
- Hedwig Pauly-Winterstein as Countess Adrienne Moreau
- Ida Wüst as Madame de la Roquére
- Rudolf Forster as Count François Moreau
- Curt Goetz as Prosecutor
- Arnold Korff as Henry Beaufort, detective
- Eugen Rex as Jean, Moreau's servant
- Hermann Vallentin as police inspector
- Kurt Vespermann as Senior Prosecutor
- Marlene Dietrich as Lucie
- Loni Nest as Kitty - child
