= Waves of Fate =

- Scene from a film
- German: Wogen des Schicksals
- Directed by: Joe May
- Written by: Joe May
- Produced by: Joe May
- Starring: Mia May; Erich Kaiser-Titz; Georg John
- Cinematography: Curt Courant
- Production company: May-Film
- Distributed by: UFA
- Release date: April 1918
- Country: Germany
- Languages: Silent; German intertitles

Waves of Fate (German: Wogen des Schicksals) is a 1918 German silent drama film directed by Joe May and starring Mia May, Erich Kaiser-Titz and Georg John.

== Cast ==
- Mia May
- Erich Kaiser-Titz
- Georg John
- Rolf Brunner
- Frida Richard
- Elga Beck
- Hermann Vallentin
