= The Farmer from Texas =

1925 film by Joe May

- Lillian Hall-Davis and Willy Fritsch
- Directed by: Joe May
- Written by: Georg Kaiser (play); Rolf E. Vanloo; Joe May
- Produced by: Joe May
- Starring: Mady Christians; Willy Fritsch; Lillian Hall-Davis; Edmund Burns
- Cinematography: Carl Drews; Toni Frenguelli
- Production company: UFA
- Distributed by: UFA
- Release date: 22 October 1925
- Country: Germany
- Languages: Silent; German intertitles

The Farmer from Texas (German: Der Farmer aus Texas) is a 1925 German silent comedy film directed by Joe May and starring Mady Christians, Willy Fritsch, and Lillian Hall-Davis. It was based on the play Kolportage by Georg Kaiser. The film was considered a costly box office failure, contributing to a financial crisis at Germany's largest studio Universum Film AG. The film's sets were designed by Paul Leni.

== Cast ==
- Mady Christians as Mabel Bratt
- Edmund Burns as Erik
- Willy Fritsch as Akke
- Lillian Hall-Davis as Alice
- Christian Bummerstaedt as Raf von Stjernenhoe
- Clare Greet as Frau Appelboom
- Hans Junkermann as Baron Barrenkrona
- Pauline Garon as Miss Abby Grant
- Frida Richard as Tante Jutta
- Ellen Plessow
- Emmy Wyda

== Bibliography ==
- Hardt, Ursula (1996). From Caligari to California: Erich Pommer's Life in the International Film Wars. Providence: Berghahn Books. ISBN 978-1-57181-930-7.
- Kreimeier, Klaus (1999). The Ufa Story: A History of Germany's Greatest Film Company, 1918–1945. Berkeley: University of California Press. ISBN 978-0-520-22069-0.
