= Sappho (1921 film) =

1921 film directed by Dimitri Buchowetzki

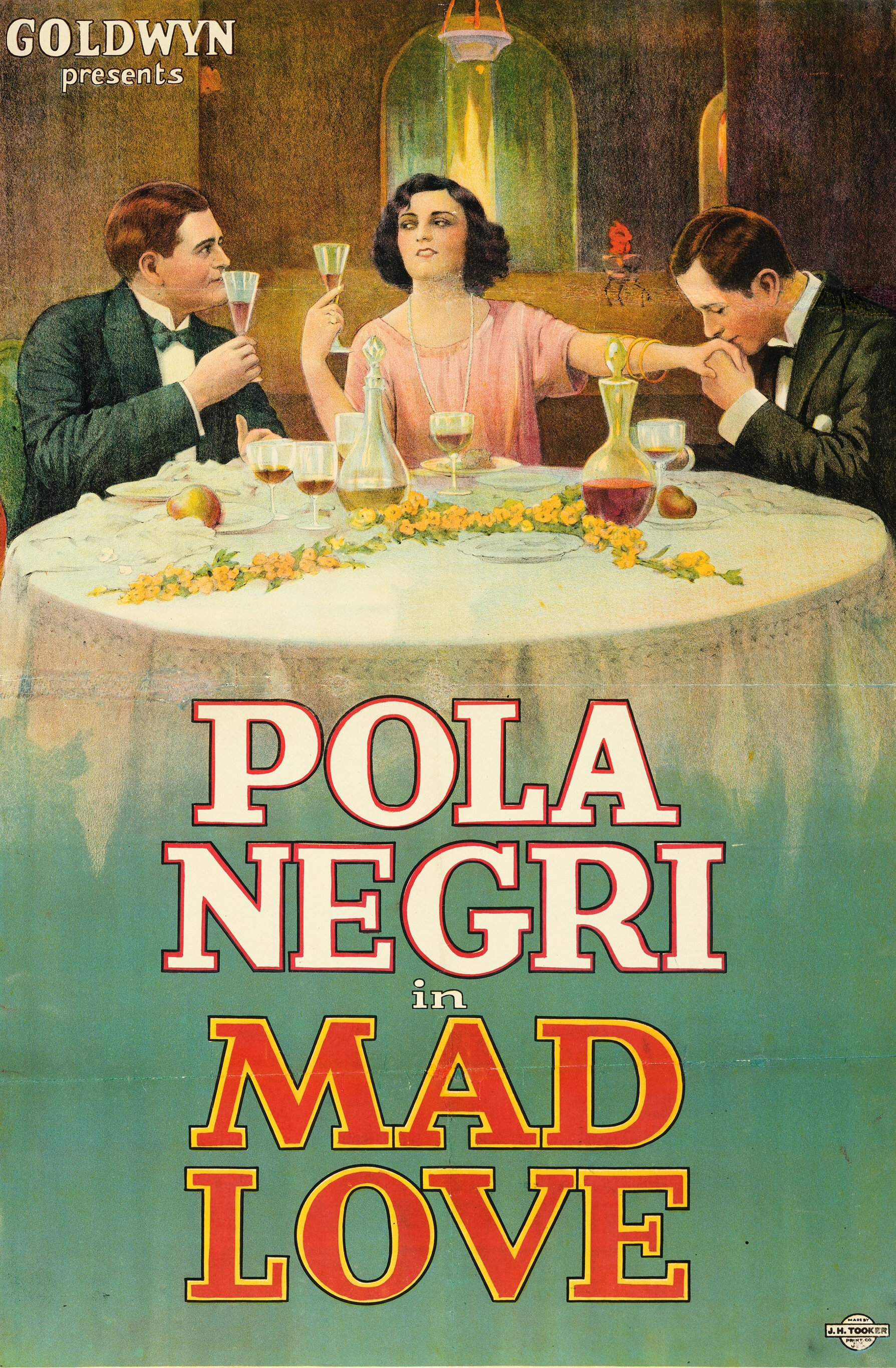
- US lobby card for Mad Love (1923)
- Directed by: Dimitri Buchowetzki
- Written by: Norbert Falk; Hanns Kräly
- Produced by: Paul Davidson
- Starring: Pola Negri; Alfred Abel; Johannes Riemann; Helga Molander; Otto Treptow; Albert Steinrück; Else Wagner; Ellinor Gynt
- Production company: PAGU
- Distributed by: UFA (Germany); Goldwyn Pictures (1923 US release)
- Release dates: 9 September 1921 (Germany); 4 March 1923 (U.S.)
- Running time: 82 minutes
- Country: Germany
- Language: Silent film

Full film

Sappho (also known as Mad Love) is a 1921 German silent film directed by Dimitri Buchowetzki and starring Pola Negri as the title character. Alfred Abel, best known for his role as John Fredersen in Metropolis (1927), appears in the role of Andreas De La Croix, the insane brother.

== Plot ==
Richard De La Croix has a brother, Andreas, who has been driven insane by a notorious vamp and socialite named Sappho. A man-about-town named Teddy takes Richard to the Odeon to meet her, but when Sappho actually meets Richard, he is unaware that she is the woman who drove Andreas insane. Sappho genuinely falls in love with Richard, and decides to leave her vampy ways behind her so that she can have him.

Sappho casts off her previous lover, an automobile company owner named Bertink, as she does. Richard and Sappho run off and engage in an affair. In the midst of their escapade, Bertink approaches Richard and lets him know that the woman he is with is the same one that drove his brother Andreas insane, and that he, Bertink, is the man that she left Andreas for. Richard is horrified and immediately terminates his relationship with Sappho.

Sappho tries to return to Bertink but is turned away, so she seeks out Teddy, Richard's man-about-town friend, and starts a rebound relationship with him. Meanwhile, Richard returns home to marry his childhood sweetheart, but then balks at the wedding supper and runs off in search of Sappho. All this time, Andreas, the mad brother, is having troubled dreams about Sappho in the lunatic asylum where he is kept. When Richard starts on his search for Sappho, Andres intuitively senses that someone is going after her, so he breaks out of the lunatic asylum and also starts to search for Sappho.

Richard finds Sappho at a ball with Teddy, and starts questioning her about her newest lover, before breaking down and admitting that she is the only woman he really loves. Andreas, the mad brother, barges in on this reunion, and manages to lock Richard out of the room. Alone with Sappho, Andreas attacks her, and in the process of doing so accidentally kills her.

== Cast ==
- Pola Negri as Sappho
- Johannes Riemann as Richard de la Croix
- Alfred Abel as Georg de la Croix
- Albert Steinrück as Andreas
- Helga Molander as Maria Garden, Roichards Braut
- Otto Treptow as Teddy
- Elsa Wagner as Richards Mutter
- Ellinor Gynt as Tänzerin

== Release ==
Sappho was released in Germany on 6 September 1921. A censored version of the film entitled Mad Love was finally released by Metro on 4 March 1923.

The UCLA has restored a tinted 35mm print of Sappho in association with Turner Entertainment; it is currently in the holdings of the UCLA Film and Television Archive. The print is believed to originate from the MGM film library.

The film was released on home video on 3 September 2009 by Grapevine Video as part of the DVD title Ladies of the German Cinema; it was released again in 2011 by Bright Shining City Productions as part of the 3-DVD set Pola Negri: The Iconic Collection. A PAL DVD edition of the film from Edition Filmmuseum is currently in the planning stages.

== Reception ==
As Mad Love, The New York Times described the story itself as a stereotyped French Victorian one, but praised Pola Negri's performance by making both her role fully believable and therefore bringing the storyline to life, saying of Negri, "She convinces you again that she is the particular person she is playing and no one else."
