= The Inheritance of Tordis =

1921 film directed by Robert Dinesen

- Directed by: Robert Dinesen
- Written by: Harriet Bloch; Adolf Lantz
- Produced by: Joe May
- Starring: Ica von Lenkeffy; Paul Hartmann; Adolf Klein
- Cinematography: Sophus Wangøe
- Production company: May-Film
- Distributed by: UFA
- Release date: 29 July 1921
- Country: Germany
- Languages: Silent; German intertitles

The Inheritance of Tordis (German: Die Erbin von Tordis) is a 1921 German silent drama film directed by Robert Dinesen and starring Ica von Lenkeffy, Paul Hartmann and Adolf Klein. The film's sets were designed by the art director Stefan Lhotka.

== Cast ==
- Ica von Lenkeffy as Anne Kathrin
- Paul Hartmann as Graf von Heyst
- Adolf Klein as Oberst von Ingenhofen
- Ilka Grüning as seine Frau
- Frida Richard as Die alte Fürstin
- Lucie Höflich as Anna Kathrins Mutter
- Karl Platen as Schuster
- Paul Otto as Kammerherr
- Ernst Hofmann
- Albert Patry
- Arnold Korff
- Hermann Picha

== Bibliography ==
- Hans-Michael Bock & Michael Töteberg. Das Ufa-Buch. Zweitausendeins, 1992.
- Grange, William. Cultural Chronicle of the Weimar Republic. Scarecrow Press, 2008.
