= Your Big Secret =

- German film poster
- German: Ihr großes Geheimnis
- Directed by: Joe May
- Written by: Rudolf Baron; Joe May; Mia May
- Produced by: Joe May
- Starring: Mia May; Käthe Haack; Johannes Riemann
- Cinematography: Max Lutze
- Production company: May-Film
- Distributed by: UFA
- Release date: 10 October 1918
- Country: Germany
- Languages: Silent; German intertitles

Your Big Secret (German: Ihr großes Geheimnis) is a 1918 German silent drama film directed by Joe May and starring Mia May, Käthe Haack and Johannes Riemann.

== Cast ==
- Mia May as Tatjana
- Käthe Haack as Klärchen Lehner
- Johannes Riemann as Helmut Karsten
- Hermann Picha as Homeowner Lehner
