= Ilona (film) =

1921 film directed by Robert Dinesen

- Directed by: Robert Dinesen
- Written by: Wilhelm Auspitzer; Adolf Lantz
- Produced by: Joe May
- Starring: Lya De Putti; Arnold Korff; Artúr Somlay
- Cinematography: Sophus Wangøe
- Production company: May-Film
- Distributed by: UFA
- Release date: 31 August 1921
- Country: Germany
- Languages: Silent; German intertitles

Ilona is a 1921 German silent film directed by Robert Dinesen and starring Lya De Putti, Arnold Korff and Artúr Somlay.

The film's sets were designed by the Hungarian art director Stefan Lhotka.

== Cast ==
- Lya De Putti as Ruschka & Ilona
- Arnold Korff as Count Balogh
- Artúr Somlay as Baron Ernö von Mezy
- H. Thorsten as Baron Géza Erdély
- Oswald Delmor as Bator, Stallmeister des Grafen
- Harald Paulsen as Imre
- Georg Rauscher as Jozsi
- Adolf Klein as Bischof
- Maria Wefers as Ethelka, Ernös Freundin
- Albert Patry

== Bibliography ==
- Bock, Hans-Michael & Bergfelder, Tim. The Concise CineGraph. Encyclopedia of German Cinema. Berghahn Books, 2009.
- Lenssen, Claudia (1991). Lenssen, Claudia; Bock, Hans-Michael (eds.). Joe May: Regisseur und Produzent. Text+Kritik. ISBN 9783883773940.
