= The Stone Rider =

1923 film directed by Fritz Wendhausen

- Directed by: Fritz Wendhausen
- Written by: Fritz Wendhausen; Thea von Harbou
- Produced by: Erich Pommer
- Starring: Rudolf Klein-Rogge; Lucie Mannheim; Gustav von Wangenheim
- Cinematography: Carl Hoffmann; Günther Rittau
- Music by: Giuseppe Becce
- Production company: Decla-Bioscop
- Distributed by: UFA
- Release date: 23 January 1923
- Running time: 86 minutes
- Country: Germany
- Languages: Silent; German intertitles

The Stone Rider (German: Der steinerne Reiter) is a 1923 German silent drama film directed by Fritz Wendhausen and starring Rudolf Klein-Rogge, Lucie Mannheim and Gustav von Wangenheim. It was shot at Babelsberg Studios in Berlin.

== Cast ==
- Rudolf Klein-Rogge as Der Herr vom Berge
- Lucie Mannheim as Hirtin
- Gustav von Wangenheim as Jäger
- Georg John as Pförtner
- Emilia Unda as Schaffnerin
- Grete Berger as Mutter der Hirtin
- Wilhelm Diegelmann as Lautensänger
- Paul Biensfeldt as Pförtner
- Otto Framer as Begleiter des Herrn vom Berge
- Emil Heyse as Befreundete Burgherr
- Fritz Kampers
- Martin Lübbert as Bräutigam
- Anni Mewes as Braut
- Hans Sternberg as Kellermeister des Burgherrn
- Erika von Thellmann

== Bibliography ==
- Bock, Hans-Michael & Bergfelder, Tim. The Concise CineGraph. Encyclopedia of German Cinema. Berghahn Books, 2009.
