= The Legend of Holy Simplicity =

1920 film directed by Joe May

- Directed by: Joe May
- Written by: Thea von Harbou
- Produced by: Joe May
- Starring: Eva May; Alfred Gerasch; Wilhelm Diegelmann
- Cinematography: Werner Brandes; Günther Krampf
- Production company: May-Film
- Distributed by: UFA
- Release date: 8 October 1920
- Running time: 101 minutes
- Country: Germany
- Languages: Silent; German intertitles

The Legend of Holy Simplicity (German: Die Legende von der heiligen Simplicia) is a 1920 German silent drama film directed by Joe May and starring Eva May, Alfred Gerasch and Wilhelm Diegelmann.

The art director Erich Kettelhut worked on the film's sets.

== Cast ==
- Eva May as Heilige Simplicia
- Alfred Gerasch as Ritter Rochus
- Wilhelm Diegelmann as Herbergswirt
- Elisabeth Wilke as Oberin des Klosters
- Georg John as Blinder Bettler
- Max Gülstorff as Wanderer
- Lia Eibenschütz as Magd auf der Drachenburg
- Martha Rhema
- Rudolf Biebrach

== Bibliography ==
- Bock, Hans-Michael & Bergfelder, Tim. The Concise CineGraph. Encyclopedia of German Cinema. Berghahn Books, 2009.
- Nelmes, Jill & Selbo, Jule. Women Screenwriters: An International Guide. Palgrave Macmillan, 2015.
