= The Wrong Husband =

1931 film directed by Johannes Guter

- Directed by: Johannes Guter
- Written by: Paul Frank; Billy Wilder
- Produced by: Bruno Duday
- Starring: Johannes Riemann; Maria Paudler; Gustav Waldau
- Cinematography: Constantin Mick
- Edited by: Carl Hoffmann
- Music by: Norbert Glanzberg
- Production company: UFA
- Distributed by: UFA
- Release date: 27 March 1931
- Running time: 85 minutes
- Country: Germany
- Language: German

The Wrong Husband (German: Der falsche Ehemann) is a 1931 German comedy film directed by Johannes Guter and starring Johannes Riemann, Maria Paudler and Gustav Waldau. It was shot at the Babelsberg Studios in Berlin and on location in Saint Moritz. The film's sets were designed by the art directors Robert Herlth and Walter Röhrig. The future director Billy Wilder worked on the film's screenplay.

== Synopsis ==
Peter and Paul Hanneman are identical twin brothers with very different personalities. Peter is a manufacturer of sleeping pills, whose marriage to Ruth is under strain and whose business is struggling due to his reserved manner. His hyper-energetic brother Paul decides to help him out by taking his place for a while. This leads to a series of misunderstandings and confusions both with Ruth and with Paul's girlfriend Ines. Paul decides to replace the sleeping medicine and being producing a new invigorating drug. The Argentine millionaire Hardegg, the father of ines, kidnaps Peter who he mistakes for Paul and brings him to a Swiss ski resort to make him marry his daughter.

== Cast ==
- Johannes Riemann as Peter and Paul Hanneman
- Maria Paudler as Ruth, Peters Frau
- Gustav Waldau as H.H. Hardegg aus Buenos Aires
- Jessie Vihrog as Ines Hardegg, seine Tochter
- Tibor Halmay as Maxim Tartakoff
- Martha Ziegler as Fräulein Schulze, Sekretärin
- Fritz Strehlen as Ein Maharadscha
- Klaus Pohl
- Fred Kassen as Singer: Einmal wird dein Herzchen dir gehören
- Comedian Harmonists as Themselves

== Bibliography ==
- Klaus, Ulrich J. Deutsche Tonfilme: Jahrgang 1931. Klaus-Archiv, 2006.
- Sikov, Ed. On Sunset Boulevard: The Life and Times of Billy Wilder. Hyperion, 1999.
