= The Passion of Inge Krafft =

1921 film directed by Robert Dinesen

- Directed by: Robert Dinesen
- Written by: Joe May; Thea von Harbou
- Produced by: Joe May
- Starring: Mia May; Albert Steinrück; Conrad Veidt
- Cinematography: Sophus Wangøe
- Production company: May-Film
- Distributed by: UFA
- Release date: 11 March 1921
- Running time: 92 minutes
- Country: Germany
- Languages: Silent; German intertitles

The Passion of Inge Krafft (German: Der Leidensweg der Inge Krafft) is a 1921 German silent drama film directed by Robert Dinesen and starring Mia May, Albert Steinrück and Conrad Veidt.

The film's sets were designed by the art director Otto Hunte.

== Cast ==
- Mia May as Ingeborg Krafft
- Albert Steinrück as Fürst Wladimir Gagarine
- Conrad Veidt as Hendryck Overland
- Margarete Schön as Dagmar, Harry Radens Frau
- Heinz Stieda as Harry Raden
- Harry Hardt as Iwan, der Hirte
- Lia Eibenschütz
- Harry Frank
- Adolf Klein
- Paul Passarge
- Waldemar Potier
- Sylvia Torf

== Bibliography ==
- Jennifer M. Kapczynski & Michael D. Richardson. A New History of German Cinema. Boydell & Brewer, 2014.
- John T. Soister. Conrad Veidt on Screen: A Comprehensive Illustrated Filmography. McFarland, 2002.
