= The Wandering Image =

1920 film directed by Fritz Lang

- Directed by: Fritz Lang
- Written by: Fritz Lang; Thea von Harbou
- Produced by: Joe May
- Starring: Mia May; Hans Marr; Rudolf Klein-Rogge
- Cinematography: Guido Seeber
- Production company: May-Film
- Distributed by: UFA
- Release date: 25 December 1920
- Running time: 75 minutes
- Country: Germany
- Languages: Silent; German intertitles

The Wandering Image (1920)

The Wandering Image (German: Das wandernde Bild) is a 1920 German silent drama film directed by Fritz Lang and starring Mia May, Hans Marr and Rudolf Klein-Rogge. It is also known by the alternative titles of The Wandering Picture and The Wandering Shadow (US title). It was one of Fritz Lang's first collaborations with Thea Von Harbou.

The film's sets were designed by Otto Hunte. The art directors Erich Kettelhut and Robert Neppach were employed designing models for the production.

== Cast ==
- Mia May as Irmgard Vanderheit
- Hans Marr as Georg Vanderheit / John Vanderheit
- Harry Frank
- Rudolf Klein-Rogge as Georgs Vetter Wil Brand
- Loni Nest as Irmgards Tochter

== Bibliography ==
- Bock, Hans-Michael & Bergfelder, Tim. The Concise CineGraph. Encyclopedia of German Cinema. Berghahn Books, 2009.
- Kreimeier, Klaus. The Ufa Story: A History of Germany's Greatest Film Company, 1918-1945. University of California Press, 1999.
