= Joe Deebs =

Joe Deebs was a fictional detective who appeared in a series of German films and serials during the silent era. Along with Stuart Webbs and a number of other fictional cinema detective characters with Anglo-Saxon names, he was modeled on Arthur Conan Doyle's Sherlock Holmes. In 2009, Ken Wlaschin wrote that "Joe Deebs was one of the most famous screen detectives of the German silent cinema, the suave crime-solving star of at least thirty films."

Deebs was played by six different actors including Max Landa, Heinrich Schroth and Harry Liedtke. The films were produced by Joe May (Julius Mandl), who also directed several of the films. Some of the films were produced at Weissensee Studios.

Deebs' first appearance was in 1915 during the First World War and the character continued to be featured in films through the early 1920s during the Weimar Republic. One example is Der Onyxknopf, or The Onyx Head, a 1917 silent film starring Max Landa, Bruno Kastner and Leopoldine Konstantin.

== Bibliography ==
- Abel, Richard. Encyclopedia of Early Cinema. Taylor & Francis, 2005.
- Isenberg, Noah William. Weimar Cinema: An Essential Guide to Classic Films of the Era. Columbia University Press, 2013.
- Prawer, S.S. Between Two Worlds: The Jewish Presence in German and Austrian Film, 1910-1933. Berghahn Books, 2005.
