= Paul Leni =

German film director (1885–1929)

- Born: Paul Josef Levi; 8 July 1885; Stuttgart, Baden-Württemberg, German Empire
- Died: 2 September 1929 (aged 44); Los Angeles, California, U.S.
- Occupations: Film director, art director
- Years active: 1913–1929
- Notable work: Waxworks; The Cat and the Canary; The Man Who Laughs
- Movement: German Expressionism

Paul Leni (born Paul Josef Levi, 8 July 1885 – 2 September 1929) was a German filmmaker and a key figure in German Expressionism, making Hintertreppe (1921) and Waxworks (1924) in Germany, and The Cat and the Canary (1927), The Chinese Parrot (1927), The Man Who Laughs (1928), and The Last Warning (1928) in the United States.

== Life and career ==
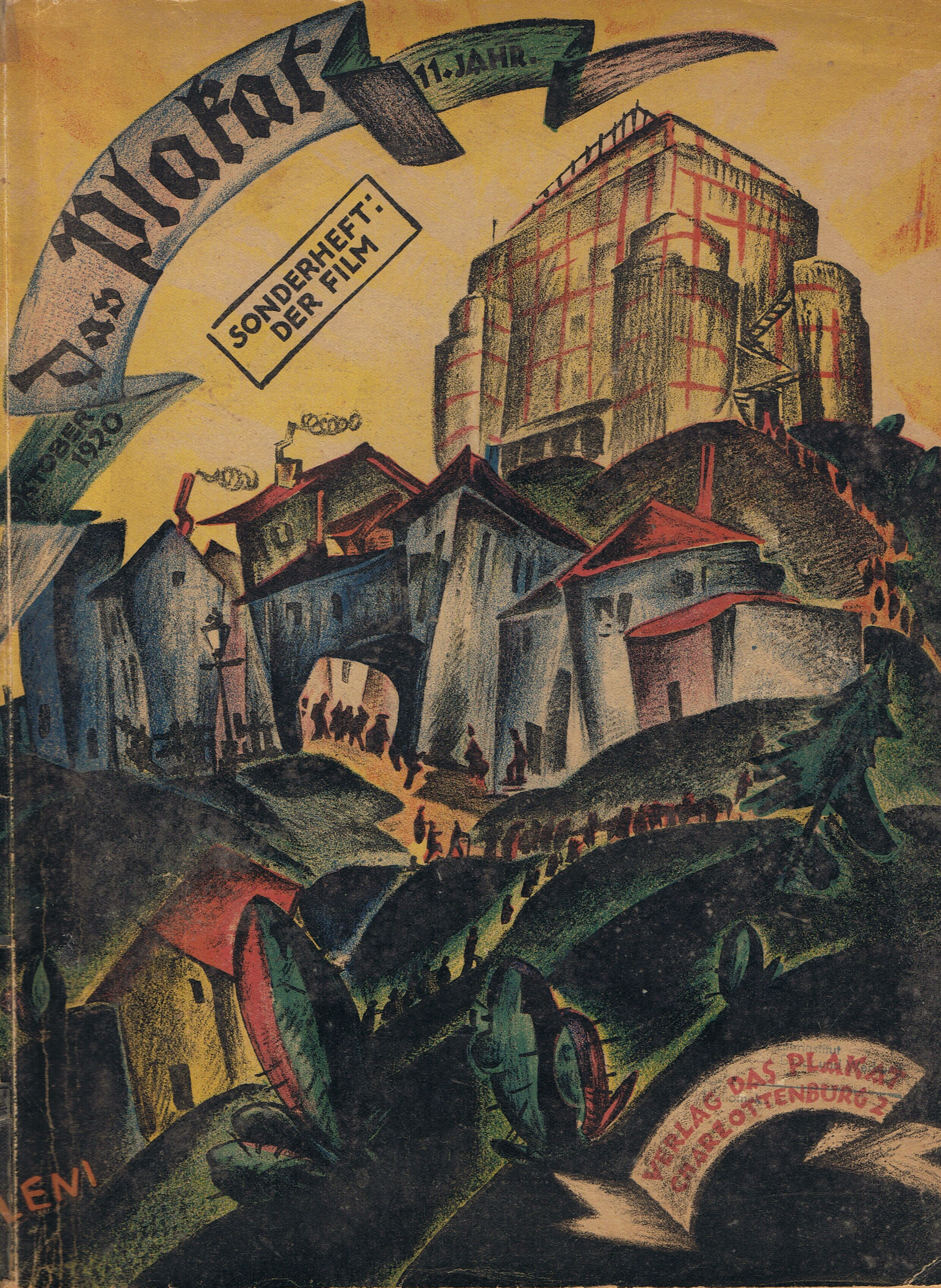
Cover for poster magazine Das Plakat special issue in Der Film (The Movie), October 1920

Paul Josef Levi was born to a Jewish family in Stuttgart. He became an avant-garde painter at the age of 15, he studied at Berlin's Academy of Fine Arts, and subsequently worked as a theatrical set designer, working for a number of theatres in Berlin (but not with Max Reinhardt).

In 1913, he started working in the German film industry designing film sets and/or costumes for directors such as Joe May, Ernst Lubitsch, Richard Oswald, and E. A. Dupont.

During World War I, Leni started directing as well with films such as Der Feldarzt (Das Tagebuch des Dr. Hart, 1917), Patience (1920), Die Verschwörung zu Genua (1920/21) and Backstairs (1921). In 1923 he participated in the creation of the theater cabaret-cafe Gondola in Berlin. Waxworks (1924) was planned as a four-part omnibus feature, but the last part was not shot when money ran out. He also made a series of unusual short animated films Rebus-Film Nr. 1–8, which were filmed crossword puzzles.

Leni designed short prologues for festive film premieres in Berlin cinemas, such as Lubitsch's Forbidden Paradise (1924), Herbert Brenon's Peter Pan (1924), and E. A. Dupont's Variety (1925).

In 1927, he accepted Carl Laemmle's invitation to become a director at Universal Studios and moved to Hollywood. There Leni made a distinguished directorial debut with The Cat and the Canary (1927), an adaptation of John Willard's stage play. The film had a great influence over Universal's later classic "haunted house" horror series, and was subsequently remade several times, notably in 1939 with Bob Hope. The following year he directed the big budget The Man Who Laughs (based on the novel by Victor Hugo), one of the most visually stylized of late period silent films.

His final film was The Last Warning, envisioned as a companion film for The Cat and the Canary due to its predecessor's popularity. Leni died in Los Angeles on 2 September 1929, of sepsis brought on by an untreated tooth infection, only eight months after its release. He was 44.

== Filmography ==
=== German films ===
As art director

- Ein Ausgestoßener (1913) (dir: Joe May)
- The Man in the Cellar (1914) (dir: Joe May)
- The Armoured Vault (1914) (dir: Joe May)
- Der Katzensteg (1915) (dir: Max Mack)
- Der Blusenkönig (1917) (dir: Ernst Lubitsch)
- The Ring of Giuditta Foscari (1917)
- Veritas Vincit (1919) (dir: Joe May)
- Intoxication (1919) (dir: Ernst Lubitsch)
- The White Peacock (1920) (dir: E. A. Dupont)
- The Vulture Wally (1921) (dir: E. A. Dupont)
- Lady Hamilton (1921) (dir: Richard Oswald)
- Children of Darkness (1921)
- Frauenopfer (1922) (dir: Karl Grune)
- Tragedy of Love 1922) (4 parts, dir: Joe May)
- The Countess of Paris (1923)
- The Farmer from Texas (1925) (dir: Joe May)
- The Wife of Forty Years (1925) (dir: Richard Oswald)
- Dancing Mad (1925) (dir: Alexander Korda)
- Manon Lescaut (1926) (dir: Arthur Robison)
- Einspänner Nr. 13 / Fiaker Nr. 13 (1926) (dir: Michael Kertész)
- The Golden Butterfly (1926) (dir: Michael Kertész)
- Maytime (1926) (dir: Willi Wolff)

As director (and art director)

- 1917 Dr. Hart's Diary/ Der Feldarzt / Das Tagebuch des Dr. Hart
- 1917 Prima vera
- 1917 Dornröschen
- 1918 The Mystery of Bangalore
- 1919 The Platonic Marriage
- 1919 Prince Cuckoo
- 1920 Patience
- 1921 The Conspiracy in Genoa
- 1921 Hintertreppe (dir with Leopold Jessner)
- 1924 Waxworks (Das Wachsfigurenkabinett)
- 1925/26 Rebus-Film Nr. 1–8 (series of short films)

=== Universal Studio films ===
- The Cat and the Canary (1927)
- The Chinese Parrot (1927)
- The Man Who Laughs (1928)
- The Last Warning (1928)

== Bibliography ==
- Schneider, Steven Jay, ed. (2007). 501 Movie Directors. London: Cassell Illustrated. p. 33. ISBN 9781844035731. OCLC 1347156402.
