= Dear Homeland =

1929 film directed by Carl Wilhelm

- Directed by: Carl Wilhelm
- Written by: Gernot Bock-Stieber; Ada Van Roon
- Produced by: Erich Engels
- Starring: Renate Müller; Jakob Tiedtke; Hans Albers; Hans Brausewetter
- Cinematography: Max Grix
- Production company: Erich Engels-Film
- Release date: 31 July 1929
- Country: Germany
- Languages: Silent; German intertitles

Dear Homeland (German: Teure Heimat) is a 1929 German silent comedy film directed by Carl Wilhelm and starring Renate Müller, Jakob Tiedtke and Hans Albers. The film's art direction was by Max Heilbronner. A German mechanic considers emigrating to the United States, but changes his mind when he falls in love with a local woman.

== Cast ==
- Renate Müller as Gretchen Jürgen
- Jakob Tiedtke as Großvater von Gretchen
- Hans Albers as Verbrecher / Chefingenieur Orginsky?
- Hans Brausewetter as Karl Alder
- Annemarie Steinsieck
- Fritz Schulz
- Bruno Ziener
- Paul Westermeier
- Henry Bender
- Hugo Werner-Kahle
- Lotte Werkmeister
- Else Reval as Zimmervermieterin
- Iwa Wanja

== Bibliography ==
- Prawer, S.S. Between Two Worlds: The Jewish Presence in German and Austrian Film, 1910–1933. Berghahn Books, 2005.
