= Fever for Heights =

1924 German silent film by Gernot Bock-Stieber

- Austrian poster
- Directed by: Gernot Bock-Stieber
- Written by: Gernot Bock-Stieber; Ada Van Roon
- Starring: Sascha Gura; Hanni Reinwald; Erich Kaiser-Titz
- Cinematography: Hans Bloch; Georg Siebert
- Production company: Epro-Film
- Release date: 31 December 1924
- Country: Germany
- Languages: Silent; German intertitles

Fever for Heights (German: Höhenfieber) is a 1924 German silent film directed by Gernot Bock-Stieber and starring Sascha Gura, Hanni Reinwald and Erich Kaiser-Titz.

The film's sets were designed by the art director Carl Ludwig Kirmse.

== Cast ==
- Hanni Reinwald
- Sascha Gura
- Erich Kaiser-Titz
- Bengt Aage
- Björn Hvid
- Robert Scholz

== Bibliography ==
- Alfred Krautz. International directory of cinematographers, set- and costume designers in film, Volume 4. Saur, 1984.
