= Certificates of Death =

1923 film directed by Lothar Mendes

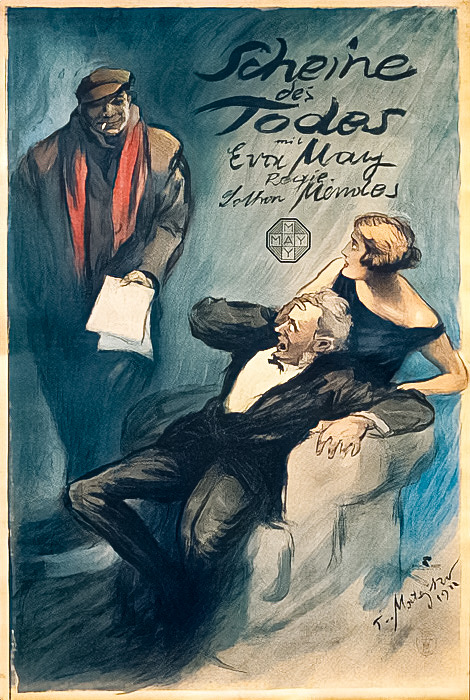
- Directed by: Lothar Mendes
- Written by: Lothar Mendes; Paul Merzbach
- Produced by: Joe May
- Starring: Alfred Abel; Eva May; Iván Petrovich
- Cinematography: Karl Puth
- Production company: May-Film
- Distributed by: UFA
- Release date: 14 September 1923
- Country: Germany
- Languages: Silent; German intertitles

Certificates of Death (German: Scheine des Todes) is a 1923 German silent film directed by Lothar Mendes and starring Alfred Abel, Eva May, and Iván Petrovich.

The film's sets were designed by the art director Stefan Lhotka.

== Cast ==
- Alfred Abel as Lord Hull
- Eva May
- Iván Petrovich
- Bruno Decarli
- Alfons Fryland
- Albert Steinrück
- Arnold Korff
- Hugo Döblin
- Willy Kaiser-Heyl
- Kurt Gerron
- Leonhard Haskel
- Inge Helgard
- Olga Chekhova

== Bibliography ==
- Grange, William (2008). Cultural Chronicle of the Weimar Republic. Lanham, MD: Scarecrow Press. ISBN 978-0-8108-5967-8.
