= Iván Petrovich =

Serbian actor (1894–1962)

- Иван Петровић
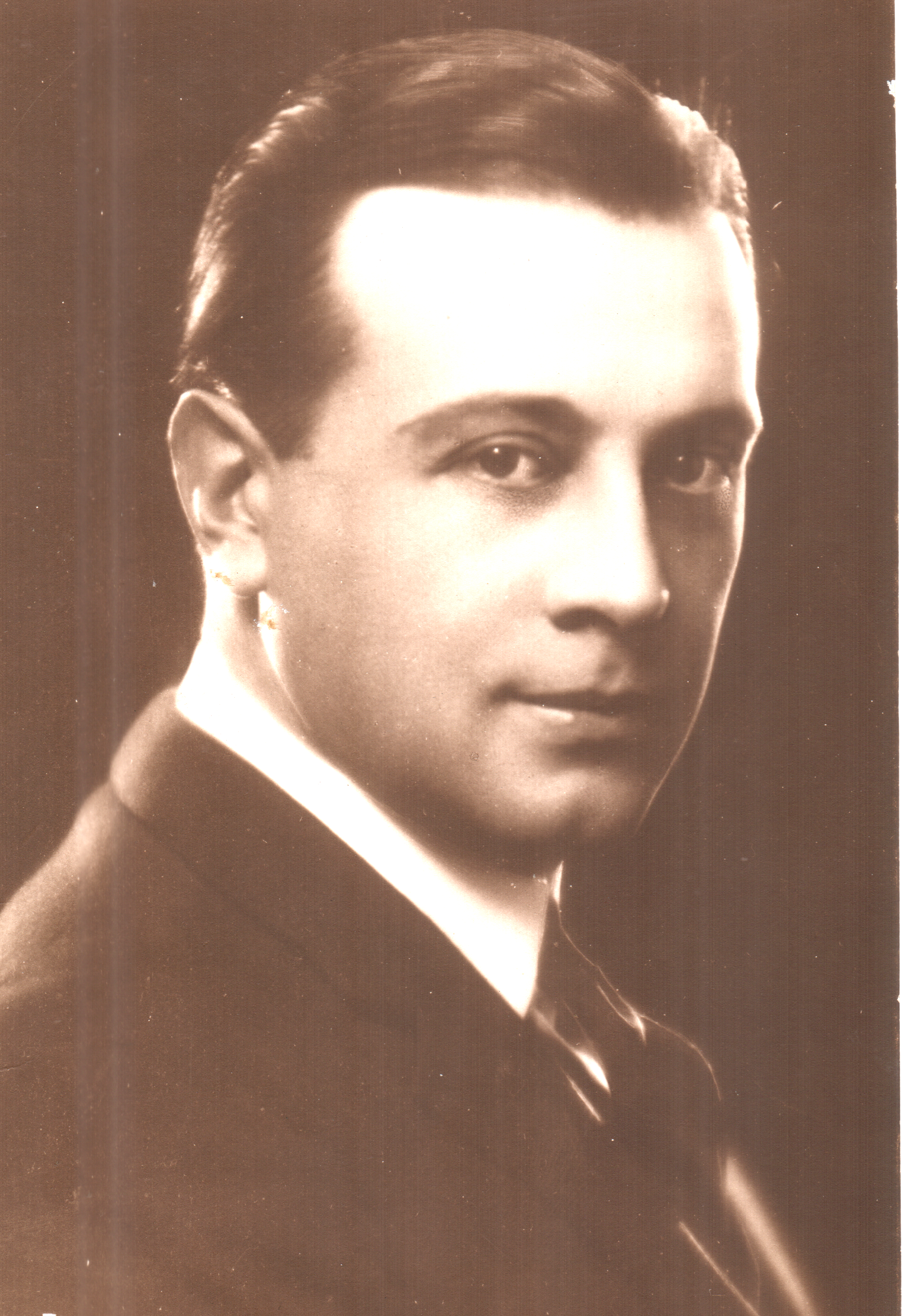
- Born: Svetislav Petrović; 1 January 1894; Újvidék, Kingdom of Hungary, Austria-Hungary
- Died: 18 October 1962 (aged 68); Munich, West Germany
- Occupation: Actor
- Years active: 1918–1962
- Spouse: Friedel Schuster

Iván Petrovich (Serbian: Иван Петровић, romanized: Ivan Petrović; 1 January 1894 – 18 October 1962) was a Serbian film actor and singer.

He was the first actor from Yugoslavia to have a successful international movie career. Petrovich mainly worked in German cinema, but also collaborated with established directors in some 100 Hungarian, French, Spanish, Czechoslovak and Hollywood movies.

== Early life ==
He was born Svetislav Petrović (Serbian Cyrillic: Светислав Петровић) on 1 January 1894 in Újvidék, Austria-Hungary, today Novi Sad in the Serbian province of Vojvodina. His father Mladen was a tailor who made uniforms for the Serbian army. After finishing the primary education in his hometown, he moved to Budapest, where he graduated from the Polytechnic academy.

He was a talented singer and violinist and was an accomplished athlete, who participated as a swimmer at the 1912 Summer Olympics in Stockholm, Sweden.

During the World War I he was drafted into the Austro-Hungarian army and after the war ended, he moved to Vienna to pursue a film career.

== Career ==
=== Early career ===
In Vienna he met a film director Mihály Kertész, who fled Hungary after the war, and who will later make a major Hollywood career as Michael Curtiz. Kertész directed Petrovich in three movies: The Sunflower Woman in 1918 on the play by Ivo Vojnović, The Lady with the Black Gloves in 1919 and, the most successful, The Star of Damascus in 1920. Kertész thought that Petrovich's name Svetislav is too hard to remember, so he chose Iván for him. He later worked with a prominent Hungarian directors Paul Czinner (Homo immanis, 1918) and Béla Balogh (Under the Mountains, 1920), before moving to France.

=== France ===
In the mid 1920s he became an international star with a string of French movies, styled "the most cherished lover of the French cinema". He marked the period, mostly being typecast as a latin lover, in the movies of Léonce Perret (Koenigsmark, 1923; The Nude Woman, 1926; Morgane, the Enchantress, 1928), Germaine Dulac (Heart of an Actress, 1924) or Marco de Gastyne (The Lady of Lebanon, 1926). He was partnered on screen with the most popular French actresses of the day like Louise Lagrange, Nita Naldi and Arlette Marchal.

=== Hollywood ===
Petrovich was noticed by Hollywood director Rex Ingram who at the time lived and worked in Southern France, where he established a studio in Nice. Ingram directed Petrovich in three films, all co-starring Ingram's wife, Alice Terry: The Magician in 1926, and The Garden of Allah and The Three Passions, both in 1927. At one point, Petrovich was considered as one of the potential successors of Rudolf Valentino, who died prematurely in 1926.

=== Transition to sound ===
With the advent of sound, Petrovich's career did not seem to be hampered. Tall, handsome and good looking, with a sonorous voice, he even prospered, expanding his acting range to the more character roles, like the aristocrats, noblemen, officers and priests, in the "Slavic charm" manner. However, even though multilingual, his bad English accent turned out to be an insurmountable obstacle, so he had to scrap his Hollywood plans.

=== Germany ===
He made some 40 films in Germany before the outbreak of the war, under the direction of the best German directors and co-starring with the most popular actors of the period. As a good singer, he was frequently cast in filmed operettas.

He worked often with directorial couple Jacob and Luise Fleck (The Orlov in 1927, Doctor Schäfer in 1928, The Tsarevich in 1929) and Richard Oswald (Victoria and Her Hussar in 1931, The Flower of Hawaii in 1933, co-starring Marta Eggerth). Other movies from this period include 1928 Alraune by Henrik Galeen, co-starring Brigitte Helm and Paul Wegener, 1929 Latin Quarter by Augusto Genina, 1931 The Opera Ball by Max Neufeld, co-starring Liane Haid and Die Fledermaus by Karel Lamač, 1932 Grandstand for General Staff by Eugen Thiele, 1934 Paganini, in title role, by E. W. Emo, co-starring Theo Lingen, and The Last Waltz by Georg Jacoby, 1935 The Cossack and the Nightingale by Phil Jutzi, 1937 Unter Ausschluß der Öffentlichkeit by Paul Wegener and 1939 Zentrale Rio by Erich Engels, co-starring Ita Rina.

=== World War II ===
After the World War II began, Petrovich continued to act in mostly lightweight, fun movies. He stayed in touch with Serbian issues by visiting his friends, captured Serbian officers, in Nazi camps, which caused him problems with the Nazi Security Service. After being pressured to participate in propaganda flick Enemies, directed by Viktor Tourjansky, which tried to justify German occupation of Poland, Petrovich migrated to Hungary. He spent there the remainder of the war, acting in several movies along popular stars like Pál Jávor and Katalin Karády. Most notable was 1941 Géza von Radványi's antimilitary Europe does not respond.

=== Later career ===
After the war ended and Communist government was set in Hungary, Petrovich moved back to Germany. In the next 15 years he continued mostly in the supporting roles, but was still sought actor in the German-speaking countries.

His notable roles from this period include films The Trial by G.W. Pabst, Beethoven's biopic Eroica by Walter Kolm-Veltée and Sissi – The Young Empress by Ernst Marischka. Among Petrovich's last movies were Louis Malle's first feature film Elevator to the Gallows in 1958 and Anatole Litvak's The Journey in 1959.

Apart from acting, in this period he also worked as a radio announcer on Radio Free Europe, which was headquartered in Munich at the time.

== Serbia ==
Petrovich made no Yugoslav movies, but did act in German-Yugoslav coproductions, The Coral Princess in 1937 directed by Victor Janson, co-starring Ita Rina, and Dalmatian Wedding in 1953, directed by Géza von Bolváry.

That was not an obstacle for the exceptional popularity in his homeland and legions of fans, though. In 1928 he visited Belgrade, causing unprecedented hysteria. Filmmaker Marko Babac in his 2009 book Boško Tokin – novinar i pisac, prvi srpski estetičar, publicista i kritičar filma published an excerpt from the Novosti newspapers' account on Petrovich's visit: "From all corners of Belgrade, like torrents, girls of Belgrade rushed to see Svetislav Petrović with a secret hope in their souls that at least one of his fiery glances will fall on them, their lipsticked lips and loving eyes. Journalists, waiting in a lounge, waited for Svetislav Petrović to step out of his quarters, where he spent time in the bathroom doing swimming, massaging and gymnastics. Upon seeing him, the crowd swung and stirred, the girls' hearts stroke hard and throaths turned dry because of the souls' sensations. They all commented how gorgeous and perfect he is. Delighted mass almost smothered him as they advanced towards him. It seemed as if, in an effort to show him love, they wanted to lynch him.“

In contrast to that period, Petrovich is largely forgotten in Serbia today. One of the reasons is thought to be his work in Radio Free Europe, which was strongly disliked by the post-war Communist authorities of Yugoslavia. In an effort to change that, Serbian national film library, Jugoslovenska kinoteka, dedicated year 2017 to him, with prepared programs for showing his movies throughout the whole year.

Even though he spoke fluent Hungarian, German, French and English language, he signed autographs only in Serbian Cyrillic alphabet.

== Personal life ==
Petrovich married German singer and actress Friedel Schuster.

He died of stomach cancer on 18 October 1962 in Munich, West Germany and was interred in city's Nordfriedhof cemetery.

== Selected filmography ==
- The Sunflower Woman (1918)
- The Lady with the Black Gloves (1919)
- Homo immanis (1919)
- A tizennegyedik (1920) - Jim Jeffries / Riche Richson
- Under the Mountains (1920)
- The Star of Damascus (1920)
- Die Gottesgeisel (1920)
- A Szentmihály (1920)
- Lengyelvér (1921) - Janek bujdosó
- Farsangi mámor (1921) - Sir Richard Dennis ifjú arisztokrata
- Veszélyben a pokol (1921) - Harry
- Galathea (1921)
- Navarro the Dancer (1922) - Mortensen
- Certificates of Death (1923)
- Koenigsmark (1923) - Lieutenant de Hagen
- Un coquin (1923) - Callas / Quermec
- Heart of an Actress (1924) - Herbert Campbell, le poète
- Az örszem (1924)
- Joyless Street (1925) - Herr (unconfirmed, uncredited)
- The Lady of Lebanon (1926) - Cpt. Lucien Domèvre
- Grandstand for General Staff (1926) - Colonel Esterhazy
- The Magician (1926) - Dr. Arthur Burdon
- The Nude Woman (1926) - Pierre Bernier
- The Garden of Allah (1927) - Father Adrien
- The Orlov (1927) - Alexander - Russian Exile
- Prince or Clown (1928) - Lucien Tréma
- Alraune (1928) - Franz Braun
- Morgane, the Enchantress (1928) - Georges de Kerduel
- Doctor Schäfer (1928) - Dr. Schäfer, Frauenarzt
- Secrets of the Orient (1928) - Prince Achmed
- Corazones sin rumbo (1928)
- The Tsarevich (1928) - Czarewitch
- The Three Passions (1928) - Philip Burlington
- Latin Quarter (1929) - Ralph O'Connor Rodolpho
- His Majesty's Lieutenant (1929) - Graf Georg Michailowitsch
- The Favourite of Schonbrunn (1929) - Oberst Trenck
- There Is a Woman Who Never Forgets You (1930) - Georg Moeller - der Sohn
- Love and Champagne (1930) - Fritz von Hornthal
- The King of Paris (1930, German) - Don Pedro d'Alvarez
- The King of Paris (1930, French) - Pedro Gil
- Boudoir diplomatique (1931)
- The Opera Ball (1931) - Dr. Peter v. Bodo
- Victoria and Her Hussar (1931) - Stefan Koltay, Husaren-Rittmeister
- Die Fledermaus (1931) - Prinz Orlofsky
- Holzapfel Knows Everything (1932) - Stephan Berregi
- La Chauve-Souris (1931) - Le prince Orlofsky
- Grandstand for General Staff (1932) - Rittmeister von Jennewein
- The Tsar's Diamond (1932) - Doroschinsky
- Manolescu, Prince of Thieves (1933) - George Manolescu
- The Flower of Hawaii (1933) - Kapitän Harald Stone
- Must We Get Divorced? (1933) - Edgar Radek
- The Happiness of Grinzing (1933) - Hans Martin, der Postillon
- Paganini (1934) - Paganini
- Polish Blood (1934) - Graf Bolko Baransky
- The Last Waltz (1934) - Oberleutnant Graf Dimitrij Sarrasow
- The Red Rider (1935) - Rittmeister Otto von Wellisch
- The Cossack and the Nightingale (1935) - Gregor Ogolenski
- Königstiger (1935) - van Houten
- Ungeküsst soll man nicht schlafen gehn (1936) - Prinz Carlo Alba
- Three Girls Around Schubert (1936) - Furlani
- Girls in White (1936) - Count Feodor Ivanowitsch Schuwalow
- Women's Paradise (1936) - Gary Field, Flugzeugkonstrukteur
- Woman's Love—Woman's Suffering (1937) - Hans Martenrood
- The Chief Witness (1937) - Stefan Laurin
- Unter Ausschluß der Öffentlichkeit (1937) - Baron Gaffris
- The Coral Princess (1937) - Marko Vukowitsch, Fliegeroffizier
- Monika (1938) - Dr. Michael Holt
- Stronger Than Love (1938)
- The Night of Decision (1938) - Fernando Alvarez
- Parkstrasse 13 (1939) - Arno Molander
- Central Rio (1939) - Ricardo Perez
- Dein Leben gehört mir (1939)
- Enemies (1940) - Jan
- Europe Doesn't Answer (1941) - Vincent Gordon
- Életre ítéltek! (1941) - Csaba, ügyvéd
- Magdolna (1942) - Detky, Pál
- To Be God One Time (1942) - Professor Freiburg
- Ópiumkeringö (1943) - Zongoramûvész, házigazda
- Kalotaszegi Madonna (1943) - Karsady Géza
- Machita (1944) - Szávody György, gyárigazgató
- II. magyar kívánsághangverseny (1944)
- The Trial (1948) - Egressy, Staatsanwalt
- Arlberg Express (1948) - Barna
- Verlorenes Rennen (1948)
- Eroica (1949) - Fürst Lichnovsky
- Bonus on Death (1950)
- Who Is This That I Love? (1950) - Andreas Ostenhof
- The Reluctant Maharaja (1950) - Der Maharadscha von Hatschipur
- Czardas of Hearts (1951) - Tornay senior
- Vienna as It Was (1951)
- Desires (1952) - Direktor Wallberg
- The Forester's Daughter (1952) - Graf Paalen
- The Devil Makes Three (1952) - Sigmund Neffs
- Fritz and Friederike (1952) - Baumann, Offizier
- They Call It Love (1953) - Gregory
- Once I Will Return (1953) - Ruge
- The Little Czar (1954) - Großherzog Feodor
- Sissi – The Young Empress (1956) - Dr. Max Falk
- Widower with Five Daughters (1957) - Mr. Pfefferkorn
- Spring in Berlin (1957) - Michael Markoff
- Elevator to the Gallows (Ascenseur pour l'échafaud) (1958) - Horst Bencker
- The Journey (1959) - Szabó Bácsi
- Forever my love (1962) - (uncredited) (final film role)
