= Dathe (surname) =

Dathe is a German-origin surname. Notable people with the surname include:

- Heinrich Dathe (1910–1991), German zoologist
- Heinz Dathe, East German rower
- Toni Dathe-Fabri, German screenwriter and actress
