= I Love You (1925 film) =

1925 film

- Ich liebe dich
- Directed by: Paul L. Stein
- Written by: Rolf E. Vanloo; August Hermann Zeiz (novella)
- Produced by: Paul Davidson
- Starring: Liane Haid; Alfons Fryland; Anny Ondra
- Cinematography: Curt Courant
- Production company: Davidson-Film
- Distributed by: UFA
- Release date: 30 January 1925
- Running time: 60 minutes
- Country: Germany
- Languages: Silent; German intertitles

I Love You (German: Ich liebe dich) is a 1925 German silent drama film directed by Paul L. Stein and starring Liane Haid, Alfons Fryland, and Anny Ondra.

The film's sets were designed by the art director Heinrich Richter.

== Cast ==
- Liane Haid as Manuela
- Alfons Fryland as Aage Adelström
- Anny Ondra as Helen Adelström
- Harry Hardt as Clemens Brigge
- Fritz Alberti as John O'Brien
- Livio Pavanelli as Leon Tressani
- Ernst Pröckl as Tom Harley
- Paul Biensfeldt as Prof. Spoelmann

== Bibliography ==
- Bock, Hans-Michael; Bergfelder, Tim, eds. (2009). The Concise Cinegraph: Encyclopaedia of German Cinema. New York: Berghahn Books. ISBN 978-1-57181-655-9.
