= The Red Peacock =

1920 film

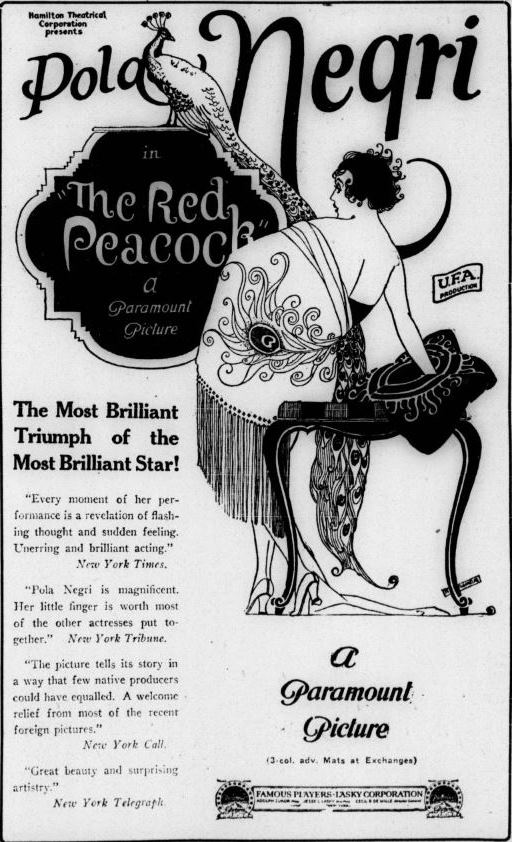
- American advertisement
- Directed by: Paul L. Stein
- Written by: James Ashmore Creelman; Hanns Kräly
- Based on: La Dame aux Camelias by Alexandre Dumas fils
- Produced by: Paul Davidson
- Starring: Pola Negri; Victor Varconi
- Cinematography: Fritz Arno Wagner
- Production company: PAGU
- Distributed by: UFA
- Release date: 25 December 1920
- Country: Germany
- Language: Silent (German intertitles)

The Red Peacock (German: Arme Violetta) is a 1920 German silent film directed by Paul L. Stein and starring Pola Negri and Victor Varconi. It was shot at the Tempelhof Studios and distributed by UFA. Long thought lost, the film was rediscovered in a New York basement in 2020. The film is an adaptation of Alexandre Dumas fils's 1848 novel, La Dame aux Camelias.

== Cast ==
- Pola Negri as Violetta Duclos
- Alexander Antalffy as Gaston
- Paul Biensfeldt as Alfred's father
- Michael Bohnen
- Ernst Bringolf
- Guido Herzfeld as Violetta's father
- Paul Otto as Graf von Geray
- Greta Schröder as Alfred's sister
- Victor Varconi as Alfred Germont
- Marga von Kierska as Flora

== Bibliography ==
- Mariusz Kotowski. Pola Negri: Hollywood's First Femme Fatale. University Press of Kentucky, 2014.
