= My Friend the Millionaire =

1932 film

- Directed by: Hans Behrendt
- Written by: Ferdinand Ujhelyi (play)
- Starring: Hermann Thimig; Maria Meissner; Liselotte Schaak
- Music by: Hans J. Salter
- Production company: Münchner Lichtspielkunst
- Distributed by: Bavaria Film
- Release date: 13 January 1932
- Running time: 81 minutes
- Country: Germany
- Language: German

My Friend the Millionaire (German: Mein Freund, der Millionär) is a 1932 German comedy film directed by Hans Behrendt and starring Hermann Thimig, Maria Meissner and Liselotte Schaak. It was shot at the Bavaria Studios in Munich.

== Cast ==
- Hermann Thimig as Hans Felix
- Maria Meissner as Irene un Kokette
- Liselotte Schaak as Eva
- Olga Limburg as Mutter
- Jakob Tiedtke as Vater
- Ernst Dumcke as Bankier
- Paul Biensfeldt as Der Millionär
- Leo Peukert as Prokurist
- Sergius Sax as Kurdirector

== Bibliography ==
- Klaus, Ulrich J. Deutsche Tonfilme: Jahrgang 1932. Klaus-Archiv, 1988.
