= Ship in Distress (1929 film) =

1929 film directed by Carmine Gallone

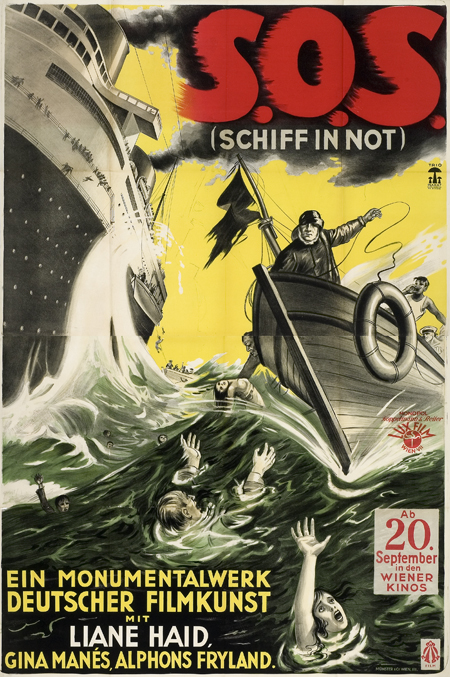
- Directed by: Carmine Gallone
- Written by: Carmine Gallone
- Starring: Liane Haid; Alfons Fryland; Gina Manès
- Cinematography: Victor Arménise; Friedl Behn-Grund; Willi Teske
- Music by: Werner Schmidt-Boelcke
- Production company: Deutsche Film Union
- Distributed by: Deutsche First National Pictures
- Release date: 28 February 1929
- Running time: 115 minutes
- Country: Germany
- Languages: Silent; German intertitles

Ship in Distress (German: S.O.S. Schiff in Not) is a 1929 German silent drama film directed by Carmine Gallone and starring Liane Haid, Alfons Fryland, and Gina Manès. It was shot at the Halensee Studios and Staaken Studios in Berlin. The film's sets were designed by Heinz Fenchel and Jacek Rotmil. It was distributed by the German branch of First National Pictures.

== Cast ==
- Liane Haid as Grazia Boni
- Alfons Fryland as Mario Boni
- Gina Manès as Rita del Rios
- André Nox as Der Clown
- Harry Nestor as Mohamed Bey
- Leopold von Ledebur as Der Kapitän
- Sylvia Torf
- Raimondo Van Riel as Flavio, Marios Freund

== Bibliography ==
- Bock, Hans-Michael; Bergfelder, Tim, eds. (2009). The Concise Cinegraph: Encyclopaedia of German Cinema. New York: Berghahn Books. ISBN 978-1-57181-655-9.
