= The Journey (1959 film) =

1959 American drama film by Anatole Litvak

- Theatrical release poster
- Directed by: Anatole Litvak
- Written by: George Tabori
- Produced by: Anatole Litvak
- Starring: Deborah Kerr; Yul Brynner; Robert Morley; E. G. Marshall; Jason Robards
- Cinematography: Jack Hildyard
- Edited by: Dorothy Spencer
- Music by: Georges Auric
- Production company: Alby Pictures
- Distributed by: Metro-Goldwyn-Mayer
- Release date: February 19, 1959
- Running time: 122-126 minutes
- Country: United States
- Language: English
- Budget: $2,290,000
- Box office: $3,450,000

The Journey is a 1959 American drama film directed by Anatole Litvak. A group of Westerners try to flee Hungary after the Soviet Union moves to crush the Hungarian Revolution of 1956. It has Ron Howard in his first credited acting role, Deborah Kerr, Yul Brynner, Jason Robards (also his film debut), Robert Morley, E. G. Marshall, Anne Jackson, and Anouk Aimée. Kerr and Brynner were paired for the first time since they starred in The King and I in 1956. The Journey was shot in Metrocolor.

== Plot ==
In 1956 a group of passengers stranded at Budapest Airport during the Hungarian uprising are taken in a bus towards the frontier with neutral Austria. From there they intend to drive to Vienna.

A sick man in the back seat, who claims to be an Englishman called Flemyng, seems known to an aristocratic Englishwoman, Lady Ashmore, sitting in the front seat. The journey is difficult with diversions and roadblocks, some operated by Soviet troops and others by Hungarian insurgents. At a small lakeside town close to the Austrian border, the passengers are removed from the bus by Major Surov, the local Soviet commander. After questioning them and impounding their passports, Surov orders they remain in the town's only hotel. He suspects the ailing Flemyng's passport is not genuine and develops a love interest in the attractive Lady Ashmore.

It emerges that Flemyng is a Hungarian insurgent whom Lady Ashmore, his lover, is smuggling to safety. Surov deduces both facts but does not act, hoping that Lady Ashmore will offer herself to him in exchange for safe passage into Austria. Speaking good English, which Surov claims to have learned in Canada, he uses the trapped passengers as a sounding board for his views, arguing that Russians are human too and questioning the imposition of Marxism by military force. However, with Flemyng getting weaker from what is revealed as an untreated gunshot wound, Lady Ashmore bribes a fisherman to take the two of them to Austria, across the lake under cover of darkness. Surov deduces what is happening and captures them both. After getting Flemyng treatment by an army doctor, Surov sends Lady Ashmore back to the hotel. The other passengers are furious that Lady Ashmore jeopardised their release with her selfish behaviour. A pregnant American woman warns Lady Ashmore very frankly what she should do to save them all.

Sniping by Hungarians has kept the Russian garrison on edge and a shot wounds Surov's beloved black horse. Unable to euthanise the horse himself, revealing a compassionate side to his nature, Surov orders a sergeant to kill the stricken animal. Lady Ashmore returns, dutifully, prompting Surov, in deep sorrow, to question if she returned willingly. When she truthfully says no, Surov releases Lady Ashmore. In the morning Surov orders the passengers to leave, minus the arrested Flemyng, driving to a quiet spot where they can walk into Austria. As the party crosses the border, Surov turns up with the weakened Flemyng, who he releases to Lady Ashmore. As Surov watches the two disappear, he is shot by Hungarian insurgents.

== Cast ==
- Deborah Kerr as Diana Ashmore
- Yul Brynner as Major Surov
- Jason Robards as Henry Flemyng / Paul Kedes
- Robert Morley as Hugh Deverill
- E. G. Marshall as Harold Rhinelander
- Anne Jackson as Margie Rhinelander
- Ron Howard as Billy Rhinelander
- Flip Mark as Flip Rhinelander
- Kurt Kasznar as Csepege
- David Kossoff as Simon Avron
- Gérard Oury as Teklel Hafouli
- Marie Daëms as Françoise Hafouli
- Anouk Aimée as Eva
- Maria Urban as Gisela von Rachlitz
- Siegfried Schürenberg as von Rachlitz
- Charles Régnier as Capt. Ornikidze
- Iván Petrovich as Szabó Bácsi
- Senta Berger as Serving Girl in Black Scarf

== Notes ==
The following prologue appears in the onscreen credits: "The action of this story takes place between Budapest, the capital of Hungary, and the Austro-Hungarian border, where the film was actually photographed. The time is November, 1956, during the tragic days of the Hungarian uprising."

Although the film’s credits state, “produced at Wien Film Studios, in Vienna, Austria,” news items specify that the film was partially shot at the Rosenhuegel Studio in Vienna. According to a February 1959 Variety article, producer-director Anatole Litvak indicated that the Soviet government had attempted unofficially to pressure the Austrian government to stop the production of The Journey. Litvak also noted that the film had been subject to severe criticism in the Communist press.

== Kerr and Brynner's relationship ==
The Journey was made in Vienna in March–June 1958, a period when there were rumors that there was a love affair between them. But Deborah Kerr ended the whole gossip by marrying for the second time. Peter Viertel, who was a talented playwright and also one of the screenwriters for The Journey, became her husband in 1960, and Yul Brynner was one of the witnesses. The relationship between Kerr and Brynner was described by their close friends as "sister and brother" or "equal to equal", even if Kerr herself admitted that she was very much attracted by Brynner's magnetism and piercing eyes. They trusted each other and they used to visit one another while they both lived in Switzerland in the 1960s.

This film was Jason Robards's screen debut.

Ron Howard had appeared in an unbilled part in the 1956 film Frontier Woman, but The Journey marked his first credited appearance; he was billed as Ronny Howard.

== Box office ==
According to MGM records, the film earned $1,300,000 in the U.S. and Canada and $2,150,000 in other markets, resulting in a loss of $905,000.

== Reception ==
Stanley Kauffmann of The New Republic wrote- 'Cleariy Anatoie Litvak, the director, and George Tabori, the writer, were moved by the rebellion and wanted, as men and artists, to make a statement about it. Then, in themseives or under pressure, they began to compromise and whittle. The result is a mixture of cliches and shackled good intentions, seasoned with some highly effective moments.'.

== See also ==
- List of American films of 1959
