= The Woman from Berlin =

1925 film

- Directed by: Lorand von Kabdebo
- Written by: Henry Koster
- Starring: Werner Krauss; Lia Eibenschütz; William Dieterle
- Cinematography: Schlesinger von Günz
- Production company: Kabdebo-Film
- Distributed by: Hisa-Film
- Release date: 25 December 1925
- Country: Germany
- Languages: Silent; German intertitles

The Woman from Berlin (German:Die Dame aus Berlin) is a 1925 German silent drama film directed by Lorand von Kabdebo and starring Werner Krauss, Lia Eibenschütz and William Dieterle.

The film's sets were designed by the art director Victor Trivas.

== Cast ==
- Werner Krauss as Anton Zöllner
- Lia Eibenschütz as Renate
- William Dieterle as Wulf Tormann
- Jaro Fürth as Dr. Berger
- Jakob Tiedtke as Alter tormann
- Eugen Rex as Fritz Lehner
- Erra Bognar as Betty

== Bibliography ==
- Grange, William. Cultural Chronicle of the Weimar Republic. Scarecrow Press, 2008.
