= The Devil and Circe =

1921 film

- Theatrical film poster
- German: Teufel und Circe
- Directed by: Adolf Gärtner
- Written by: Alf Zengerling
- Starring: Sascha Gura; Eduard von Winterstein; Walter von Allwoerden; Margarete Kupfer
- Cinematography: Adolf Gärtner; Josif Rona
- Music by: Mark Lothar
- Production company: Hawa-Film
- Release date: 7 June 1921
- Country: Germany
- Languages: Silent; German intertitles

The Devil and Circe (German: Teufel und Circe) is a 1921 German silent drama film directed by Adolf Gärtner and starring Sascha Gura, Eduard von Winterstein and Walter von Allwoerden. It premiered in Munich on 7 June 1921.

== Cast ==
- Sascha Gura as Circe
- Walter von Allwoerden as Der Teufel
- Margarete Kupfer as Hexe
- Eduard von Winterstein
- Heinz Erdmann
