= The Prince of the Mountains =

1921 film

- Directed by: Harry Piel
- Written by: Lothar Knud Frederik
- Produced by: Harry Piel
- Starring: Harry Piel
- Cinematography: Georg Muschner; Franz Meinecke
- Production company: Harry Piel Film
- Release date: 10 November 1921
- Country: Germany
- Languages: Silent; German intertitles

The Prince of the Mountains (German:Der Fürst der Berge) is a 1921 German silent film directed by and starring Harry Piel.

== Cast ==
In alphabetical order

- Maria Asti
- Charly Berger
- Friedrich Berger
- Sascha Gura as Juana
- Alfred Kuehne as Mynther van Zaanten
- Kurt Mathé
- Harry Piel as Unus
- Fritz Ruß
- Gaby Ungar as Edith van Zaanten

== Bibliography ==
- Cheryl Krasnick Warsh & Dan Malleck. Consuming Modernity: Gendered Behaviour and Consumerism before the Baby Boom. UBC Press, 2013.
