= Liselotte Schaak =

German actress

- Born: 27 October 1908; Barmen, German Empire
- Died: 30 August 1996 (aged 87); Düsseldorf, Germany
- Occupation: Actress
- Years active: 1930-1943

Liselotte Schaak (27 October 1908 – 30 August 1996) was a German actress who appeared in more than thirty films during the Weimar and Nazi eras. She starred in the 1930 film Sabotage.

== Selected filmography ==
- Rivals for the World Record (1930)
- Alraune (1930)
- Dance Into Happiness (1930)
- Sabotage (1930)
- The Battle of Bademunde (1931)
- The Emperor's Sweetheart (1931)
- The Mad Bomberg (1932)
- A Tremendously Rich Man (1932)
- An Auto and No Money (1932)
- My Friend the Millionaire (1932)
- Paprika (1932)
- The Four Musketeers (1934)
- Fanny Elssler (1937)
- The Secret Lie (1938)
- Friedemann Bach (1941)
- The Golden Spider (1943)
- The Eternal Tone (1943)

== Bibliography ==
- Hodges, Graham Russell Gao. Anna May Wong: From Laundryman's Daughter to Hollywood Legend. Hong Kong University Press, 2012.
