= Out of the Mist (film) =

1927 film directed by Fritz Wendhausen

- Directed by: Fritz Wendhausen
- Written by: Paul Keller (novel); Hans Kyser
- Produced by: Karl Freund
- Starring: Mady Christians; Werner Fuetterer; Lia Eibenschütz
- Cinematography: Robert Baberske; Günther Krampf; Theodor Sparkuhl
- Music by: Gustav Gold
- Production company: Deutsche Vereins-Film
- Distributed by: Deutsche Fox
- Release date: 24 March 1927
- Running time: 197 minutes
- Country: Germany
- Languages: Silent; German intertitles

Out of the Mist (German title: Der Sohn der Hagar) is a 1927 German silent drama film directed by Fritz Wendhausen and starring Mady Christians, Werner Fuetterer and Lia Eibenschütz. It was shot at the Staaken Studios in Berlin. The film's sets were designed by art directors, Erich Kettelhut and Karl Vollbrecht. It was released by the German subsidiary of the Fox Film Company.

== Cast ==
- Mady Christians as Lore
- Werner Fuetterer as Robert Hellmich
- Lia Eibenschütz as Christine
- Gertrud de Lalsky as Anna Hartmann
- Mathias Wieman as Dr. Friedlieb
- Bruno Ziener as Jakob Hellmich
- Auguste Prasch-Grevenberg as Gertrud Hellmich
- Carl Theodor Klock as Berthold
- Hermann Vallentin as Steinert
- Vladimir Sokoloff as Poleto
- Emil Heyse as Gottlieb Peukert
- Paul Rehkopf as Gendarm
- Frederick Valk
- Max Schreck

== Bibliography ==
- Grange, William. Cultural Chronicle of the Weimar Republic. Scarecrow Press, 2008.
