= Fire of Love (1925 film) =

1925 film

- Swedish poster
- Directed by: Paul L. Stein
- Written by: Jolanthe Marés; Wilhelm Thiele
- Produced by: Paul Davidson
- Starring: Liane Haid; Alfons Fryland; Walter Rilla
- Cinematography: Curt Courant
- Production company: Davidson-Film
- Distributed by: UFA
- Release date: 11 September 1925
- Country: Germany
- Languages: Silent; German intertitles

Fire of Love (German: Liebesfeuer) is a 1925 German silent film directed by Paul L. Stein and starring Liane Haid, Alfons Fryland, and Walter Rilla.

The film's sets were designed by the art director Walter Reimann. It was distributed by the major studio UFA.

== Cast ==
- Liane Haid as Ingeborg Toselli, Tochter des Balletmeisters
- Alfons Fryland as Erik, Graf von Arenheim
- Walter Rilla as Harald von Bodenstein
- Paul Biensfeldt as James Toselli, Balletmeister
- Maria Reisenhofer as Charlotte, Gräfin von Arenheim
- Ernst Pröckl as Eriks Bursche
- Max Hiller as Franz
- Louis V. Arco as Johannes Hellmer, Maler
- Loni Nest as Dorle von Arenheim
- Hans Staufen

== Bibliography ==
- Grange, William (2008). Cultural Chronicle of the Weimar Republic. Lanham, MD: Scarecrow Press. ISBN 978-0-8108-5967-8.
