= Hidden Fires =

Hidden Fires may refer to:

- Hidden Fires (1918 film), American film directed by George Irving
- Hidden Fires (1925 film), German film directed by Einar Bruun
