= The Lady with the Black Gloves =

1919 film

- Directed by: Michael Curtiz
- Written by: Iván Siklósi
- Starring: Lucy Doraine
- Cinematography: Gustav Ucicky
- Production company: Sascha-Film
- Release date: 21 November 1919
- Country: Austria
- Languages: Silent; German intertitles

The Lady with the Black Gloves (German: Die Dame mit dem schwarzen Handschuh) is a 1919 Austrian film directed by Michael Curtiz.

== Plot ==
The beautiful Helene, who hides a branding scar on her hand beneath a black glove she constantly wears, grew up among criminals. Her friend André equips her with everything she will need for their future misdeeds. Her first task is to marry the Duke of Komarow in order to quickly gain access to his fortune. When the high-ranking gentleman suddenly dies one day, Helene becomes an immediate suspect. She is arrested and convicted as a murderer.

André helps her escape from prison. However, he does not do this out of pure kindness; rather, he has already plans for Helene and their next scheme. Helene is to marry the envoy Gonter de Rieux (other sources refer to him as Viscount de Gontrau), but this time André is not interested in money. André, who has positioned himself as Helene's personal servant, is after important secret files belonging to the Count. André subsequently absconds with the documents, leaving Helene behind. However, Helene's feelings for the Viscount are genuine, so the remorseful sinner tries to recover the files for her husband. In doing so, she meets her demise.

== Cast ==
- Lucy Doraine as Helene
- Harry Walden as Gonter de Rieux
- Iván Petrovich
- Kurt Lessen
