= Paul L. Stein =

Austrian and British film director (1892–1951)

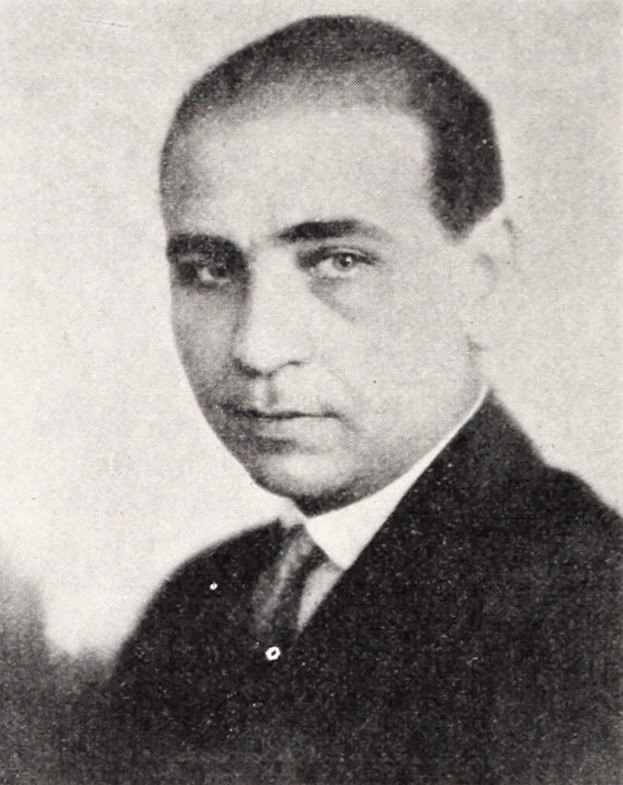
- From a 1926 magazine
- Born: 4 February 1892; Vienna, Austria-Hungary
- Died: 2 May 1951 (aged 59); London, England
- Occupation: Film director
- Years active: 1918 – 1950

Paul Ludwig Stein (4 February 1892 – 2 May 1951) was an Austrian and British film director with at least 67 films to his credit.

== Biography ==
Born in Vienna in 1892, Stein began his film career in Berlin in 1918. He worked exclusively in the German silent film industry until 1926, when he first went to Hollywood, and spent the next five years commuting between Germany and the United States, where he worked with stars such as Jeanette MacDonald, Lillian Gish, and Constance Bennett.

In 1931, Stein relocated to England after gaining a contract with British International Pictures, where he was assigned a number of big-name prestige productions, including some of the popular operetta films of the mid-1930s. These included Blossom Time and Heart's Desire starring his boyhood friend Richard Tauber, who also made cameo appearances in two of his post-war films Waltz Time and Lisbon Story. For most his career, Stein's credits tended to be films primarily aimed at female audiences, although later he also directed crime and spy thrillers. Stein remained in England for the rest of his life and career, becoming a British citizen in 1938. He died in London in 1951.

== Partial filmography ==
=== Director ===
- Intrigue (1920)
- The Closed Chain (1920)
- My Wife's Diary (1920)
- The Red Peacock (1921)
- The Eternal Struggle (1921)
- A Debt of Honour (1921)
- The Chain Clinks (1923)
- Fire of Love (1925)
- The Island of Dreams (1925)
- I Love You (1925)
- Tea Time in the Ackerstrasse (1926)
- My Official Wife (1926)
- Don't Tell the Wife (1927)
- The Climbers (1927)
- The Office Scandal (1929)
- This Thing Called Love (1929)
- One Romantic Night (1930)
- The Lottery Bride (1930)
- Sin Takes a Holiday (1930)
- Born to Love (1931)
- The Common Law (1931)
- A Woman Commands (1932)
- Lily Christine (1932)
- Breach of Promise (1932)
- The Song You Gave Me (1933)
- Red Wagon (1933)
- Blossom Time (1934)
- Mimi (1935)
- Heart's Desire (1935)
- Faithful (1936)
- Cafe Colette (1937)
- Jane Steps Out (1938)
- Black Limelight (1939)
- The Outsider (1939)
- Poison Pen (1939)
- Just Like a Woman (1939)
- It Happened to One Man (1940)
- Talk About Jacqueline (1942)
- The Saint Meets the Tiger (1943)
- Kiss the Bride Goodbye (1945)
- Twilight Hour (1945)
- Waltz Time (1945)
- Lisbon Story (1946)
- The Laughing Lady (1946)
- Counterblast (1948)
- The Twenty Questions Murder Mystery (1950)

=== Actor ===
- Zucker und Zimt (1915)
