= To a Woman of Honour =

1924 film

- Directed by: Rudolf Biebrach
- Written by: Marie Luise Droop
- Produced by: Peter Ostermayr
- Starring: Lucy Doraine; Georg H. Schnell; Fritz Greiner
- Cinematography: Karl Attenberger
- Production company: Messter-Ostermayr-Film
- Release date: March 1924
- Running time: 66 minutes
- Country: Germany
- Languages: Silent; German intertitles

To a Woman of Honour (German: Um eines Weibes Ehre) is a 1924 German silent film directed by Rudolf Biebrach and starring Lucy Doraine, Georg H. Schnell and Fritz Greiner.

The film's sets were designed by the art director Carl Ludwig Kirmse.

== Cast ==
- Lucy Doraine
- Georg H. Schnell
- Fritz Greiner
- Emil Fenyő
- Robert Scholz
- Toni Wittels

== Bibliography ==
- Krautz, Alfred (1984). International Directory of Cinematographers, Set- and Costume Designers in Film. Vol. 4. Munich: Saur. ISBN 978-3-598-21434-9.
