= Navarro the Dancer =

1922 film

- Directed by: Ludwig Wolff
- Written by: Thomas Hall
- Produced by: Paul Ebner; Maxim Galitzenstein
- Starring: Alexander Granach; Asta Nielsen; Iván Petrovich
- Production company: Maxim-Film
- Distributed by: UFA
- Release date: November 1922
- Country: Germany
- Languages: Silent; German intertitles

Navarro the Dancer (German:Die Tänzerin Navarro) is a 1922 German silent film directed by Ludwig Wolff and starring Alexander Granach, Asta Nielsen and Iván Petrovich. The film was released in November 1922.

== Cast ==
In alphabetical order

- Alexander Granach as Clegg
- Asta Nielsen as Carmencita Navarro
- Iván Petrovich as Mortensen
- Adele Sandrock as Mutter Navarro
- Hans Wassmann as Marcellus Gondriaan

== Bibliography ==
- Grange, William. Cultural Chronicle of the Weimar Republic. Scarecrow Press, 2008.
