= Carl Ludwig Kirmse =

German art director (1888–1982)

- Born: 4 May 1888; Frankfurt am Main, Hesse, German Empire
- Died: 14 April 1982 (aged 93); Ramsau bei Berchtesgaden, Bavaria, West Germany
- Occupation: Art director
- Years active: 1919–1961 (film)

Carl Ludwig Kirmse (1888–1982) was a German art director who worked prolifically on films during the silent and sound eras.

== Selected filmography ==
- The House of Torment (1921)
- Country Roads and the Big City (1921)
- The Fountain of Madness (1921)
- Lumpaci the Vagabond (1922)
- Your Valet (1922)
- The Hungarian Princess (1923)
- The Beautiful Girl (1923)
- To a Woman of Honour (1924)
- Fever for Heights (1924)
- Destiny (1925)
- Love's Finale (1925)
- The Searching Soul (1925)
- The Circus Princess (1925)
- My Friend the Chauffeur (1926)
- I Liked Kissing Women (1926)
- The Dashing Archduke (1927)
- The Harbour Baron (1928)
- Suzy Saxophone (1928)
- Rasputin (1928)
- Bookkeeper Kremke (1930)
- The Girl from the Marsh Croft (1935)
- The Monastery's Hunter (1935)
- The Blue Mouse (1936)
- The Heart Disposes (1936)
- The Girl of Last Night (1938)
- Northern Lights (1938)
- The Sensational Casilla Trial (1939)
- Twilight (1940)
- The Master of the Estate (1943)
- The War of the Oxen (1943)
- Why Are You Lying, Elisabeth? (1944)
- The Murder Trial of Doctor Jordan (1949)
- Artists' Blood (1949)
- Where the Trains Go (1949)
- The Cloister of Martins (1951)
- When the Heath Dreams at Night (1952)
- Marriage Strike (1953)
- Hubertus Castle (1954)
- Silence in the Forest (1955)
- The Vulture Wally (1956)
- A Summer You Will Never Forget (1959)

== Bibliography ==
- Giesen, Rolf. Nazi Propaganda Films: A History and Filmography. McFarland, 2003.
