= The Love Affairs of Hector Dalmore =

1921 film directed by Richard Oswald

- Directed by: Richard Oswald
- Written by: Richard Oswald
- Produced by: Richard Oswald
- Starring: Conrad Veidt; Erna Morena; Kitty Moran; Lya De Putti
- Cinematography: Otto Kanturek
- Production company: Richard-Oswald-Produktion
- Release date: 22 February 1921
- Country: Germany
- Languages: Silent; German intertitles

The Love Affairs of Hector Dalmore (German: Die Liebschaften des Hektor Dalmore) is a 1921 German silent drama film directed by Richard Oswald and starring Conrad Veidt, Erna Morena, and Kitty Moran. It premiered in Berlin on 22 February 1921.

== Cast ==
- Conrad Veidt as Hektor Dalmore
- Erna Morena as Theresa
- Kitty Moran as Errie
- Helene Ford as Lela
- Maja Servos as Lona
- Sascha Gura as Rosanna
- Aenne Ullstein as Madge
- Lya De Putti as Zofe
- Henry Sze as Diener
- Hans Junkermann as Gatte
- Anton Pointner as Junger Mann
- Georg Langer as Zwei Gauner
- Preben J. Rist

== Bibliography ==
- Grange, William (2008). Cultural Chronicle of the Weimar Republic. Lanham, MD: Scarecrow Press. ISBN 978-0-8108-5967-8.
