= Mrs. Dane's Confession =

1921 film

- Directed by: Michael Curtiz
- Produced by: Alexander Kolowrat
- Starring: Lucy Doraine; Alfons Fryland
- Cinematography: Gustav Ucicky
- Distributed by: Sascha-Film
- Release date: 7 October 1921
- Running time: 50 minutes
- Country: Austria
- Language: Silent

Mrs. Dane's Confession (German: Frau Dorothys Bekenntnis) is a 1921 Austrian drama film directed by Michael Curtiz, and starring Lucy Doraine and Alfons Fryland.

== Plot ==
As described in a film magazine review, Dorothy Robey, engaged to William Farleigh, jilts him in favor of a Count, who marries her, spends her fortune, and murders her father, without being called to account for the crime. She obtains a divorce and weds Farleigh and a baby is born. The Count reappears, attempts to blackmail her, and threatens to take away her child. In desperation she kills him. Arrested, she tells her story in full and is acquitted by the jury. The action develops in Paris.

== Cast ==
- Lucy Doraine as Dorothy Robey
- Alfons Fryland as William Farleigh
- Otto Treßler as John Robey
- Harry De Loon as Harry Dane
- Kurt von Lessen as Jimmy Fox
- Count Ludi Salm as Harry Harwood

== See also ==
- Michael Curtiz filmography
