= Victim of Love (1923 film) =

1923 film

- Directed by: Martin Hartwig
- Written by: Alfred Schirokauer; Guy de Maupassant (story)
- Starring: Lucy Doraine; Alfons Fryland; Hermann Pfanz
- Cinematography: Franz Koch; Georg Schubert
- Production company: Münchner Lichtspielkunst
- Distributed by: Bavaria Film
- Release date: March 1923
- Country: Germany
- Languages: Silent; German intertitles

Victim of Love (German: Opfer der Liebe) is a 1923 German silent drama film directed by Martin Hartwig and starring Lucy Doraine, Alfons Fryland, and Hermann Pfanz.

The film's sets were designed by the art director Willy Reiber.

== Cast ==
- Lucy Doraine
- Alfons Fryland
- Hermann Pfanz
- Margarete Schlegel
- Rudolf Lettinger

== Bibliography ==
- Krautz, Alfred (1984). International Directory of Cinematographers, Set- and Costume Designers in Film. Vol. 4. Munich: Saur. ISBN 978-3-598-21434-9.
