= By Order of Pompadour =

1924 film

- German film poster
- German: Auf Befehl der Pompadour
- Directed by: Frederic Zelnik
- Written by: René Ferry; Alfred Halm
- Starring: Alwin Neuß; Lya Mara; Frida Richard
- Cinematography: Edoardo Lamberti; Georg Muschner
- Music by: Willy Schmidt-Gentner
- Production company: Phoebus Film
- Distributed by: Phoebus Film
- Release date: 25 September 1924
- Running time: 100 minutes
- Country: Germany
- Languages: Silent; German intertitles

By Order of Pompadour (German: Auf Befehl der Pompadour) is a 1924 German silent historical film directed by Frederic Zelnik and starring Alwin Neuß, Lya Mara, and Frida Richard.

The film's sets were designed by the art director Willi Herrmann.

== Cast ==
- Alwin Neuß as Abel Fernay, Fernay Automobilewerke
- Lya Mara as Lucienne, seine Nichte (1924) / Madame de Pompadour (18th century)
- Frida Richard as Catherine Fernay, seine Mutter
- Jakob Tiedtke as Cyrus Fernay, sein Brunder
- Hans Albers as Herzog von Riverolles
- Max Neumann as David Moulin, Buchhalter
- Sophie Pagay as Melisse, alte Dienerin
- Georges Vaultier as Louis XV (18th century)
- Hermann Böttcher as Luciennes Vater
- Robert Leffler as Herr von Tournehem, Luciennes Onkel
- Carl Geppert as Charles d'Etoiles
- Alfons Fryland as Engineer (1924) / Leutnant André de Rohan (18th century)
- Paul Biensfeldt as Binet
- Friedrich Kühne
- Karl Harbacher
- Harry Berber
- Ernst Behmer
- Adolphe Engers
