= Lia Eibenschütz =

German actress

- Born: 19 March 1899; Wiesbaden, Hesse-Nassau, German Empire
- Died: 9 March 1985 (aged 85); West Berlin, West Germany
- Other names: Lya Eibenschütz
- Occupation: Actress
- Years active: 1920-1971
- Spouse: Kurt Vespermann

Lia Eibenschütz (1899–1985) was a German actress. She was married to the actor Kurt Vespermann with whom she had a son Gerd Vespermann who also became an actor.

== Selected filmography ==
- The War of the Oxen (1920)
- The Legend of Holy Simplicity (1920)
- The Prisoner (1920)
- The Conspiracy in Genoa (1921)
- Parisian Women (1921)
- The Buried Self (1921)
- The Passion of Inge Krafft (1921)
- Marie Antoinette, the Love of a King (1922)
- Nathan the Wise (1922)
- The Doll Maker of Kiang-Ning (1923)
- The Merchant of Venice (1923)
- The Little Duke (1924)
- Kaddish (1924)
- Horrido (1924)
- Love's Finale (1925)
- Destiny (1925)
- The Woman from Berlin (1925)
- The Great Opportunity (1925)
- Ash Wednesday (1925)
- Women of Luxury (1925)
- Wallenstein (1925)
- Lightning (1925)
- Out of the Mist (1927)
- A Modern Casanova (1928)
- Sixteen Daughters and No Father (1928)
- The Beloved of His Highness (1928)
- The Chaste Coquette (1929)
- The Corvette Captain (1930)
- The House in Montevideo (1951)
- My Leopold (1955)
- The Copper (1958)
- Sweetheart of the Gods (1960)
- Neues vom Hexer (1965)
- Long Legs, Long Fingers (1966)
- The Smooth Career (1967)
