= The Prince and the Dancer =

1926 film directed by Richard Eichberg

- Lucy Doraine (left) and Hans Albers (centre)
- Directed by: Richard Eichberg
- Written by: Leo Birinsky
- Starring: Willy Fritsch; Hans Albers; Lucy Doraine
- Cinematography: Heinrich Gartner; Kurt Richter
- Music by: Erno Rapee
- Production company: Richard Eichberg-Film
- Distributed by: Süd-Film
- Release date: 17 April 1926
- Country: Germany
- Languages: Silent; German intertitles

The Prince and the Dancer (German: Der Prinz und die Tänzerin) is a 1926 German silent film directed by Richard Eichberg and starring Willy Fritsch, Lucy Doraine and Hans Albers. The film was shot at the Johannisthal Studios with sets designed by the art director Kurt Richter. It premiered at the Gloria-Palast in Berlin.

== Cast ==
In alphabetical order

- Hans Albers
- Lucy Doraine
- Adolphe Engers
- Willy Fritsch
- Fritz Kampers
- Sybille Lerchenfeld
- Albert Paul
- Albert Paulig
- Hermann Picha
- Robert Scholz
- Franz Schönfeld
- Julia Serda
- Valeska Stock
- Charlotte Susa
- Leopold von Ledebur

== Bibliography ==
- Bock, Hans-Michael & Bergfelder, Tim. The Concise CineGraph. Encyclopedia of German Cinema. Berghahn Books, 2009.
