= The Star of Damascus =

1920 film

- Directed by: Michael Curtiz
- Starring: Lucy Doraine; Iván Petrovich
- Cinematography: Gustav Ucicky
- Release date: 3 September 1920
- Country: Austria
- Language: Silent

The Star of Damascus (German: Der Stern von Damaskus) is a 1920 Austrian film directed by Michael Curtiz. It was followed by The Scourge of God.

== Plot summary ==
A French artist, Georges Hanet, hears a woman screaming while walking in Damascus. Rushing over, he finds Kora, who has been beaten by her master. Georges frees Kora and takes her to his house. A letter arrives for Hanet stating that his father is dead and he must return to Trieste. Georges takes Kora with him, but secludes her in his cabin. Upset by this, she leaves the cabin and starts an affair with Count Ceretti, who keeps her in his mansion. Hanet finds the mansion and, upon seeing Kora and Ceretti together, shoots Kora in the face.

Hanet is arrested and sentenced to five years of hard labor, but escapes after three and assumes the name of Fred Jevons, a painter and art instructor, in Paris. He falls in love and marries the daughter of the Marquis De Rives, Suzanne. Meanwhile, Kora arrives in Paris under the guide of Madame Des Champs where she runs a gambling house, which the Marquis frequents. Georges received a message to come to the gambling house where he sees Kora. She says that she loves Hanet and that he must visit her nightly or she will reveal the truth and have him imprisoned. Suzanne confronts Kora, who states the two will never be happy and she will send a letter to the police. Kora then goes insane and dies before the letter can be mailed. The Count reads the letter but destroys it so that Georges and Suzanne can be happy together.

== Cast ==
- Lucy Doraine
- Iván Petrovich
- Anton Tiller

== See also ==
- Michael Curtiz filmography
