= Love at the Wheel =

1921 film directed by Victor Janson

- Swedish poster
- Directed by: Victor Janson
- Written by: Erich Friesen (novel); Erich Schönfelder; Ludwig Tell
- Produced by: Ossi Oswalda; Gustav von Koczian-Miskolczy
- Starring: Ossi Oswalda; Victor Janson; Rudolf Forster
- Cinematography: Erich Waschneck
- Production company: Ossi Oswalda-Film
- Distributed by: UFA
- Release date: 7 October 1921
- Country: Germany
- Languages: Silent; German intertitles

Love at the Wheel (German: Amor am Steuer) is a 1921 German silent comedy film directed by Victor Janson and starring Ossi Oswalda, Janson and Rudolf Forster.

The film's sets were designed by the art directors Robert Neppach and Kurt Richter.

== Cast ==
- Ossi Oswalda
- Victor Janson
- Rudolf Forster
- Helga Molander
- Rose Müller
- Sophie Pagay
- Albert Paulig
- Josef Rehberger
- Jakob Tiedtke

== Bibliography ==
- Bock, Hans-Michael; Töteberg, Michael, eds. (1994) [1992]. Das Ufa-Buch: Kunst und Krisen, Stars und Regisseure, Wirtschaft und Politik (in German). Frankfurt: Zweitausendeins. ISBN 978-3-86150-065-0.
- Grange, William (2008). Cultural Chronicle of the Weimar Republic. Lanham, MD: Scarecrow Press. ISBN 978-0-8108-5967-8.
