= Her Husband's Wife =

1926 film

- German: Der Mann seiner Frau
- Directed by: Felix Basch
- Written by: Alfred Halm; Bobby E. Lüthge
- Starring: Nils Asther; Lucy Doraine; Erich Kaiser-Titz
- Cinematography: Franz Planer
- Production company: Lucy Doraine-Film
- Distributed by: Messtro-Film
- Release date: February 1926
- Country: Germany
- Languages: Silent; German intertitles

Her Husband's Wife (German: Der Mann seiner Frau) is a 1926 German silent film directed by Felix Basch and starring Nils Asther, Lucy Doraine, and Erich Kaiser-Titz.

== Cast ==
- Nils Asther
- Lucy Doraine
- Erich Kaiser-Titz
- Rudolf Klein-Rogge
- Olga Belajeff
- Olga Limburg
- Sophie Pagay
- Albert Paulig
- Luigi Serventi
