= Lucy Doraine =

Hungarian actress (1898–1989)

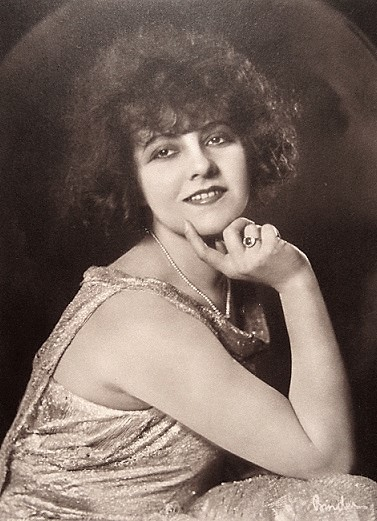
- Doraine, c. 1920s
- Born: Ilona Kovács; 22 May 1898; Budapest, Austria-Hungary
- Died: 14 October 1989 (aged 91); Los Angeles, California, U.S.
- Occupation: Actress
- Years active: 1918–1931
- Spouse: Michael Curtiz (m. 1918; div. 1923)

Lucy Doraine (born Ilona Kovács; 22 May 1898 – 14 October 1989) was a Hungarian film actress of the silent era. Born as Ilona Kovács in Budapest, she appeared in more than 20 films between 1918 and 1931. She was married to film director Michael Curtiz from 1918 to 1923. She died in Los Angeles, California, aged 91.

== Filmography ==
- A Napraforgós hölgy (1918)
- Jön az öcsém (1919)
- Die Dame mit dem schwarzen Handschuh (1919)
- Der Stern von Damaskus (1920)
- Die Gottesgeisel (1920)
- Miss Tutti Frutti (1921)
- Herzogin Satanella (1921)
- Frau Dorothys Bekenntnis (1921)
- Labyrinth des Grauens (1921)
- Sodom und Gomorrha (1922)
- Victim of Love (1923)
- The Fifth Street (1923)
- Hunted Men (1924)
- To a Woman of Honour (1924)
- Destiny (1925)
- Love's Finale (1925)
- The Searching Soul (1925)
- The Prince and the Dancer (1926)
- Her Husband's Wife (1926)
- Alpine Tragedy (1927)
- Adoration (1928)
- Christina (1929)
- The Murder Trial of Mary Dugan (1931)
