= Labyrinth of Horror =

1921 film

- Directed by: Michael Curtiz
- Written by: Fred Wallace
- Starring: Lucy Doraine; Alfons Fryland
- Cinematography: Gustav Ucicky
- Release date: 11 November 1921
- Running time: 90 minutes
- Country: Austria
- Language: Silent

Labyrinth of Horror (German: Labyrinth des Grauens) is a 1921 Austrian silent film directed by Michael Curtiz.

== Cast ==
- Lucy Doraine as Maud Hartley
- Alfons Fryland as Edward Stephenson
- Max Devrient as M. Stephenson
- Paul Askonas as Thomas Racton
- Mathilde Danegger as Gabrielle Racton
- Jean Ducret as George Hartley
