= The Beloved of His Highness =

1928 film

- Paul Richter and Vivian Gibson
- Directed by: Jacob Fleck; Luise Fleck
- Written by: Jean Gilbert (operetta); Rudolf Bernauer (operetta libretto); Rudolf Österreicher (operetta libretto); Jane Bess; Bobby E. Lüthge
- Starring: Vivian Gibson; Mary Kid; Lia Eibenschütz
- Cinematography: Emil Schünemann
- Music by: Walter Ulfig
- Production company: Orplid-Film
- Distributed by: Messtro-Orplid
- Release date: 15 February 1928
- Country: Germany
- Languages: Silent; German intertitles

The Beloved of His Highness (German: Die Geliebte seiner Hoheit) is a 1928 German silent comedy film directed by Jacob Fleck and Luise Fleck and starring Vivian Gibson, Mary Kid and Lia Eibenschütz. It was based on an operetta, by Jean Gilbert.

The film's sets were designed by the art director Willi Herrmann.

== Cast ==
- Vivian Gibson as Rita Tamara, Tänzerin
- Mary Kid as Mary
- Lia Eibenschütz as Poldi
- Paul Richter as Egenolf
- Kurt Vespermann as Achsel
- Karl Beckersachs as Prinz v. Cypern
- Hans Junkermann as Block
- Eugen Neufeld as Hoteldirektor

== Bibliography ==
- Goble, Alan (1999). The Complete Index to Literary Sources in Film. Walter de Gruyter. ISBN 978-3-11-095194-3.
