= Kurt Vespermann =

German actor (1887–1957)

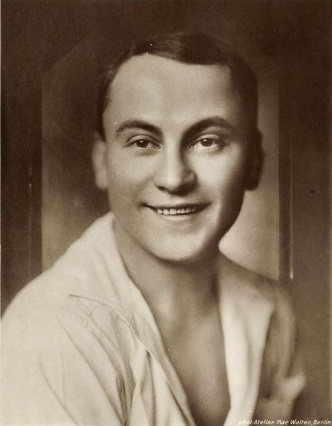
- Vespermann in 1917
- Born: 1 May 1887; Culmsee, West Prussia, German Empire (today Chełmża, Poland)
- Died: 13 July 1957 (aged 70); West Berlin, West Germany
- Occupation: Actor
- Years active: 1915–1957
- Spouse: Lia Eibenschütz

Kurt Vespermann (1 May 1887 – 13 July 1957) was a German stage and film actor.

== Career ==
Vespermann was born into a theatrical family in Culmsee, West Prussia, Imperial Germany, now Chełmża, Poland. His great-grandparents were actors and directors at different operas and theatres. Vespermann began his career in 1913 at the Royal Schauspielhaus Berlin and first appeared in silent movies in 1915.

Kurt Vespermann was married to actress Lia Eibenschütz and was the father of actor Gerd Vespermann.

Vespermann died in 1957 and was buried at the Kaiser-Wilhelm-Gedächtnis cemetery in Berlin.

== Selected filmography ==
- 1915: Manya, die Türkin
- 1915: Im Feuer der Schiffskanonen
- 1915: Police Nr. 1111 - Baron von Bode
- 1916: Ein tolles Mädchen
- 1916: Stolz weht die Flagge schwarz-weiß-rot
- 1917: Das durfte nicht kommen
- 1917: Let There Be Light (part 1, 4) - Gerd
- 1917: Königliche Bettler
- 1917: Der Tod des Baumeisters Olsen (Short)
- 1917: Das Siegel
- 1918: His Majesty the Hypochondriac
- 1918: Die Sühne - Ludwig
- 1918: Put to the Test
- 1918: The Ringwall Family - Argad, Magdalenas Brunder
- 1918: Frauchen in Nöten
- 1918: Amalie - 45 Mark
- 1918: Ehemann a. D.
- 1918: Weil ich dich liebe
- 1918: Und hätte der Liebe nicht
- 1918: Der Antiquar von Straßburg - Victor Häsli, Bruder
- 1918: Bubi, der Tausendsassa (Short)
- 1918: Arme kleine Helga
- 1919: Die Siebzehnjährigen - Sohn Frieder Schlettow
- 1920: Das Große Licht - Fritz Rasmussen
- 1920: Der Todfeind - Krüppel
- 1920: The Skull of Pharaoh's Daughter - Tirhaka
- 1920: Schiffe und Menschen - Georg Hellmann
- 1920: Florentinische Nächte
- 1921: Planetenschieber
- 1921: Burning Country - Karl
- 1921: The Shadow of Gaby Leed
- 1921: Der Gang durch die Hölle - Bob
- 1921: Kean
- 1921: Die Hexe
- 1922: Black Monday
- 1922: She and the Three - Der Dichter
- 1923: Felicitas Grolandin
- 1923: The Little Napoleon - Florian Wunderlich
- 1923: The Buddenbrooks - Renee Throta
- 1923: Tragedy of Love - Staatsanwalt-Substitut
- 1923: The Countess of Paris - Oberstaatsanwalt
- 1923: The Great Industrialist
- 1924: Maud Rockefeller's Bet - Bill Wellwood
- 1924: The Little Duke - Leutnant Alexander
- 1925: Athletes - Fridolin Stumper
- 1925: Passion - Rudi Anthofer
- 1925: Den of Iniquity - Gustav
- 1925: The Great Opportunity
- 1925: The Woman without Money
- 1925: A Woman for 24 Hours - Emil Springer
- 1926: The Pride of the Company - Musketier Franz
- 1926: Die Tugendprobe. Eine lustige Begebenheit von der Waterkant
- 1926: Accommodations for Marriage
- 1926: People to Each Other - Fritz
- 1926: The Third Squadron - Der Einjährig-Freiwilliger
- 1926: Herbstmanöver
- 1926: The Man in the Fire - Karl Winter
- 1926: The Young Man from the Ragtrade
- 1926: Unmarried Daughters - Stichelmann - ein Maler
- 1927: Der Kavalier vom Wedding
- 1927: The Pink Slippers - Adjutant
- 1927: Babette Bomberling - Kippenbach jr.
- 1927: How Do I Marry the Boss?
- 1927: Männer vor der Ehe - Der arme Junggeselle
- 1927: The Prisoners of Shanghai - Teddy Knickerbocker, Berichterstatter
- 1927: The Director General - Reinhold Gehrke
- 1927: The Indiscreet Woman - Herr Leon
- 1927: The Beggar Student - Der Kornett
- 1927: Elternlos
- 1927: Die 3 Niemandskinder - Hendrik van Vriis
- 1927: The Standard-Bearer of Sedan
- 1928: The Beloved of His Highness - Achsel
- 1928: Marys großes Geheimnis
- 1928: The Lady in Black - Carl Toll, Redakteur
- 1928: Yacht of the Seven Sins - Alfons Costa
- 1928: Die Königin seines Herzens - Graf Wetterstein, Adjutant
- 1928: Mädchenschicksale - Architekt Drews
- 1928: Eva in Silk - Fritz Jacobsthal, Manager
- 1928: Ein Tag Film (Short) - Ehemann
- 1928: Das Spiel mit der Liebe - Günther Hilpert
- 1928: Sixteen Daughters and No Father
- 1928: The Weekend Bride - Fritz Bornemann
- 1928: A Girl with Temperament - Bela Körtecz
- 1928: Der Faschingsprinz
- 1929: Asphalt
- 1929: What a Woman Dreams of in Springtime - Max Müller, Bücherreisender
- 1929: Mascots - Bruno, Musician
- 1929: The Flight from Love - Henry von Nostitz, Attaché
- 1929: The Favourite of Schonbrunn - Trencks Diener
- 1929: Land Without Women - Joe Smith, "Hastings" steward
- 1929: Trust der Diebe - Einbrecher
- 1930: Alimente - Willi Alt
- 1930: Rooms to Let - Dr. Hans Weber
- 1930: O Mädchen, mein Mädchen, wie lieb' ich Dich!
- 1930: Pension Schöller - Ernst Kissling
- 1931: Every Woman Has Something - Charles Dangerfield, Bruder
- 1931: Ich heirate meinen Mann - Bob Walter
- 1931: Terror of the Garrison - Leutnant Schmidt
- 1931: Der Verjüngte Adolar - Hans Frohammer, Friedels Verlobter
- 1931: Without Meyer, No Celebration is Complete - Elsa's Fiancé
- 1931: Children of Fortune
- 1931: Ronny - Bahnhofsvorsteher Bomboni
- 1931: The Unknown Guest - Harry Müller
- 1932: Der schönste Mann im Staate - Dr.Hans Winter, Leutnant der Reserve
- 1932: Vater geht auf Reisen - Fritz Osten
- 1932: Scandal on Park Street
- 1932: Aus einer kleinen Residenz - Oberleutnant Müller
- 1932: A Shot at Dawn - Bobby
- 1932: The Beautiful Adventure - Herr Desmigneres
- 1932: How Shall I Tell My Husband? - Diener Johann
- 1932: Thea Roland - Merkel - Journalist
- 1932: Contest - Steppke, Wenck's mechanic
- 1932: When Love Sets the Fashion - Pierre
- 1933: The House of Dora Green - Thomas
- 1933: Die Unschuld vom Lande - Paul, sein Diener
- 1933: The Sandwich Girl - Harry Knoll
- 1933: Happy Days in Aranjuez - Fred
- 1933: Ist mein Mann nicht fabelhaft? - Friedrich Zirbelschuh
- 1933: Zwei im Sonnenschein - Winkler, Zauberkünstler
- 1933: Keine Angst vor Liebe
- 1933: Hugos Nachtarbeit (Short) - Hugo Hartmann
- 1933: Der streitbare Herr Kickel (Short) - Herr Müller
- 1933: Das 13. Weltwunder (Short)
- 1934: The Voice of Love - Seppl, Ekhardt Diener
- 1934: Financial Opportunists - Dr. Günther, Rechtsanwalt
- 1934: The World Without a Mask - Dr. Tobias Bern
- 1934: You Are Adorable, Rosmarie - Tom Chester
- 1934: A Woman Who Knows What She Wants - Peter Kasten
- 1934: The Legacy of Pretoria - Hans Joachim Förster
- 1934: Lottchens Geburtstag (Short)
- 1934: Ein Heiratsantrag (Short) - Nepomuk Buschmann, der Gutsnachbar
- 1934: Die Rosarote Brille (Short)
- 1934: Bums, der Scheidungsgrund (Short)
- 1935: She and the Three - Toni Kemser, Chauffeur
- 1935: The Red Rider - Leutnant Biegl
- 1935: Wenn ein Mädel Hochzeit macht - Steffen, Gastwirt
- 1935: Der Taler der Tante Sidonie (Short) - Vater
- 1935: Wer wagt - gewinnt - Der Chauffeur des 100 PS
- 1935: The Blonde Carmen - Der Regisseur
- 1935: Buchhalter Schnabel - Bob Götz
- 1935: Forget Me Not - Ernst Mülmann - Curtis Impresario
- 1935: The Man with the Paw - Richard Möllenhof
- 1935: Unter vier Augen (Short)
- 1936: Michel Strogoff - Alcide Jolivet, French journalist
- 1936: Paul and Pauline - Heinrich Zehnpfennig, Friseur
- 1936: Engel mit kleinen Fehlern - Manager
- 1936: Orders Are Orders - Hibberlich - Verkäufer
- 1936: Der Verkannte Lebemann - Dr.Otto Seebach - Theaterdirektor
- 1936: Männer vor der Ehe - Paul Lange - Radiotechniker
- 1936: Geheimnis eines alten Hauses - Alfred Timm
- 1936: Der Lustige Witwenball
- 1937: Wenn du eine Schwiegermutter hast - Erich Rückert - Inhaber Modesalon 'Mascotte'
- 1938: The Girl with a Good Reputation - Olivieri
- 1938: Peter spielt mit dem Feuer
- 1939: Parkstrasse 13 - Mieke
- 1939: Morgen werde ich verhaftet - Jack I. Brown
- 1939: Der Arme Millionär - Sekretär Siebecke
- 1939: The Life and Loves of Tschaikovsky - Ferdyschtschenko
- 1940: Polterabend - Klaus
- 1940: Beates Flitterwoche - Heinz Kuppelweger
- 1941: Der scheinheilige Florian - Emil Krüger, Versicherungsagent
- 1941: Am Abend auf der Heide - Aufnahmeleiter Knoll
- 1941: The Gasman - Staatsanwalt
- The Night in Venice (1942) - Nicolo, Italienischer Theaterdirektor
- 1943: Gefährlicher Frühling - Peter Gornemann
- 1944: The Buchholz Family - Dr. Julius Stinde
- 1944: Marriage of Affection - Dr. Julius Stinde
- 1944: Jan und die Schwindlerin
- 1945: Shiva und die Galgenblume - (unfinished film)
- 1946: Tell the Truth
- 1947: Jan und die Schwindlerin - Ewald Bastler
- 1949: Martina
- 1951: Unschuld in tausend Nöten - Meyer
- 1951: Not Without Gisela - Prokurist Braun
- 1951: Dark Eyes - Zeidler
- 1952: A Very Big Child - Vater Kilian
- 1952: The Prince of Pappenheim - Bürgermeister
- 1953: The Rose of Stamboul - Standesbeamter
- 1953: The Empress of China - Herr Lose
- 1953: Father Is Being Stupid - Kaminski
- 1953: His Royal Highness - Finanzminister Krippenreuther
- 1954: Girl with a Future - Emil Duske
- 1954: The Seven Dresses of Katrin - Onkel Philipp Hensel
- 1954: König Drosselbart - Oberhofmeister
- 1954: Bon Voyage
- 1954: Der Briefträger ging vorbei (TV Movie) - Michel Rocheguse
- 1955: Doctor Solm
- 1955: The Ambassador's Wife - Nilsson
- 1955: Request Concert - Steinberg
- 1955: Ripening Youth - Oberstudienrat Dr. Türck
- 1955: My Leopold - Zernikow
- 1955: Son Without a Home - Maurer Menzel
- 1955: Your Life Guards - Professor
- 1956: Before Sundown - Wuttke, Fahrer bei Clausen
- 1956: Like Once Lili Marleen - Portier Krause
- 1956: Melody of the Heath - Brettschneider
- 1956: As Long as the Roses Bloom - Diener
- 1957: Jede Nacht in einem anderen Bett
- 1957: Victor and Victoria - Intendant
- 1957: Different from You and Me - Dr. Schmidt
