= Das Milliardensouper =

1923 silent film

- Directed by: Victor Janson
- Written by: Franz Rauch
- Produced by: Ossi Oswalda; Gustav von Koczian-Miskolczy
- Starring: Ossi Oswalda; Georg Alexander; Paul Biensfeldt
- Cinematography: Friedrich Paulmann
- Production company: Ossi Oswalda-Film
- Distributed by: UFA
- Release date: 27 June 1923
- Country: Germany
- Languages: Silent; German intertitles

Das Milliardensouper is a 1923 German silent comedy film directed by Victor Janson and starring Ossi Oswalda, Georg Alexander and Paul Biensfeldt.

The film's sets were designed by the art director Jacek Rotmil.

== Cast ==
- Ossi Oswalda
- Georg Alexander
- Paul Biensfeldt
- Victor Janson
- Julius Falkenstein
- Hans Junkermann
- Hanni Reinwald
- Robert Stolz

== Bibliography ==
- Bock, Hans-Michael & Bergfelder, Tim. The Concise CineGraph. Encyclopedia of German Cinema. Berghahn Books, 2009.
