= Destiny (1925 film) =

1925 film

- German: Schicksal
- Directed by: Felix Basch
- Written by: Felix Basch; Guido Kreutzer (novel); Walter Wassermann
- Produced by: Lucy Doraine
- Starring: Lucy Doraine; Conrad Veidt; Lia Eibenschütz
- Cinematography: Franz Planer; Josef Blasi
- Music by: Giuseppe Becce
- Production companies: Lucy Dorraine-Film; Messtro-Orplid
- Distributed by: Messter Film
- Release date: 12 December 1925
- Country: Germany
- Languages: Silent; German intertitles

Destiny (German: Schicksal) is a 1925 German silent drama film directed by Felix Basch and starring Lucy Doraine, Conrad Veidt, and Lia Eibenschütz.

The film's sets were designed by the art director Carl Ludwig Kirmse.

== Cast ==
- Lucy Doraine as Yvonne
- Conrad Veidt as Graf L. M. Vranna
- Lia Eibenschütz as Heddy
- Hilde Radney as Ria Verene
- Paul Bildt as Martin
- Willy Kaiser-Heyl
- Rolf Loer as Frederick Holm
- Hadrian Maria Netto as Jockey B. Craddock
- Eduard von Winterstein as Minister von Glayn
- Friedrich Kayßler as Präsident H. Milner
