= Rivals for the World Record =

1930 film

- Directed by: Ernő Metzner
- Written by: Ernő Metzner; Bob Stoll
- Produced by: Bob Stoll
- Starring: Bob Stoll; Liselotte Schaak; Nien Soen Ling
- Cinematography: Eduard von Borsody
- Music by: Georg Fiebinger
- Production company: Stoll-Film-Produktion
- Distributed by: Prometheus Film
- Release date: 29 September 1930
- Running time: 115 minutes
- Country: Germany
- Language: German

Rivals for the World Record (German: Rivalen im Weltrekord) is a 1930 German sports film directed by Ernő Metzner and starring Bob Stoll, Liselotte Schaak, and Nien Soen Ling.

== Cast ==
- Bob Stoll as Max von Oldeslo / Bob von Oldeslo
- Liselotte Schaak as Harriet Gräfin von Thysell
- Nien Soen Ling as Monteur Kinlung
- Grace Chiang as Grace, seine Tochter
- Hans Casparius as Graf Sternberg
- Robert Garrison as Ein Sternberg
- Speedy Schlichter as Kokotte

== Bibliography ==
- Murray, Bruce Arthur (1990). Film and the German Left in the Weimar Republic: From Caligari to Kuhle Wampe. Austin: University of Texas Press. ISBN 978-0-292-72465-5.
