= Love's Finale =

1925 film

- German: Finale der Liebe
- Directed by: Felix Basch
- Written by: Leo Birinsky; Alfred Halm
- Starring: Nils Asther; Lucy Doraine
- Cinematography: Franz Planer
- Production company: Lucy Dorraine-Film
- Distributed by: UFA
- Release date: 23 October 1925
- Country: Germany
- Languages: Silent; German intertitles

Love's Finale (German: Finale der Liebe) is a 1925 German silent film directed by Felix Basch and starring Nils Asther and Lucy Doraine.

The film's sets were designed by the art director Carl Ludwig Kirmse.

== Cast ==
In alphabetical order

- Nils Asther as Dr. Gaston Lasar
- V. Biander as Fürst von Davigny
- Lucy Doraine as Elena
- Lia Eibenschütz as Maria
- Lina Lossen as Gaston Lasars Mutter
- Albert Paulig as P. Tambourini - dancer
- F. Pirsanto as Count Erneste Malfatti
- Emil Rameau as Professor Troste
- A. Righter as Apache
- Gerhard Ritterband as Boy
- Luigi Serventi as Count Ermete Chassard
- Leopold von Ledebur as Count von Keroual
