= The Little Duke =

1924 film

- Directed by: Rudolf Walther-Fein
- Written by: Toni Dathe-Fabri
- Starring: Carl Wallauer; Paul Biensfeldt; Lia Eibenschütz
- Cinematography: Paul Holzki
- Production company: Aafa-Film
- Distributed by: Aafa-Film
- Release date: 1924
- Country: Germany
- Languages: Silent; German intertitles

The Little Duke (German: Der kleine Herzog) is a 1924 German silent film directed by Rudolf Walther-Fein and starring Carl Wallauer, Paul Biensfeldt and Lia Eibenschütz.

== Cast ==
- Carl Wallauer as Herzog Milan
- Paul Biensfeldt as Kammerherr von Kruczicz
- Lia Eibenschütz as Gräfin Helena
- Maria Fein as Fürstin Katharina
- Dora Friese as Irma
- Olga Limburg as Fräulein von Jonescu
- Hedwig Pauly-Winterstein as Frau von Trucschicz
- Hans Peter Peterhans as Der kleine Graf Peter
- Hermann Picha as Hofmeister
- Robert Scholz as Erbprinz Boris
- Kurt Vespermann as Leutnant Alexander
- Eduard von Winterstein as Oberst von Trucschicz

== Bibliography ==
- Bock, Hans-Michael & Bergfelder, Tim. The Concise CineGraph. Encyclopedia of German Cinema. Berghahn Books, 2009.
