= The Scourge of God (film) =

1920 film

- Directed by: Michael Curtiz
- Produced by: Alexander Kolowrat
- Starring: Lucy Doraine
- Cinematography: Gustav Ucicky
- Distributed by: Sascha-Film
- Release date: 10 September 1920
- Country: Austria
- Language: Silent

The Scourge of God (German: Die Gottesgeißel) is a 1920 Austrian film directed by Michael Curtiz. It was the sequel to The Star of Damascus.

== Cast ==
- Lucy Doraine
- Anton Tiller
- Svetozar Petrov
