= The Dance of Death (1919 film) =

- Directed by: Otto Rippert
- Written by: Fritz Lang
- Produced by: Erich Pommer
- Starring: Werner Krauss; Sascha Gura; Karl Bernhard
- Cinematography: Willy Hameister
- Production company: Helios-Film Erwin Rosner
- Distributed by: Decla-Film
- Release date: 31 October 1919
- Running time: 84 minutes
- Country: Germany
- Languages: Silent; German intertitles

The Dance of Death (German: Totentanz) is a 1919 German silent horror film directed by Otto Rippert and starring Werner Krauss, Sascha Gura and Karl Bernhard.

The film's sets were designed by the art director Hermann Warm.

== Cast ==
- Werner Krauss as The Cripple
- Sascha Gura as The Beautiful Dancer
- Karl Bernhard as Frederic Hennekemper
- Arnold Czempin as Dr. Sellin
- Fred Goebel as Harry Free, der Flieger
- Richard Kirsch
- Joseph Römer

== Bibliography ==
- Hardt, Ursula. From Caligari to California: Erich Pommer's Life in the International Film Wars. Berghahn Books, 1996.
- McGilligan, Patrick. Fritz Lang: The Nature of the Beast. University of Minnesota Press, 2013.
