= A Serious Case =

1927 film

- German: Ein schwerer Fall
- Directed by: Felix Basch
- Written by: Felix Basch; Max Jungk
- Starring: Ossi Oswalda; Alfons Fryland; Gyula Szöreghy
- Cinematography: Willy Hameister
- Production company: Ossi Oswalda-Film
- Distributed by: Deutsch-Nordische Film-Union
- Release date: 9 August 1927
- Country: Germany
- Languages: Silent; German intertitles

A Serious Case (German: Ein schwerer Fall) is a 1927 German silent comedy film directed by Felix Basch and starring Ossi Oswalda, Alfons Fryland, and Gyula Szöreghy. It was shot at the EFA Studios in Berlin. The film's sets were designed by the art director Ernst Stern.

== Cast ==
- Ossi Oswalda as Dorrit Martin
- Alfons Fryland as Lawyer Hilgers
- Gyula Szöreghy as Partner Plumow
- Henry Bender as Bürovorsteher
- Wilhelm Diegelmann as Bürgermeister
- Paul Biensfeldt as Ortsgendarm
- Ralph Arthur Roberts as Professor
- Gisela Werbisek as Housekeeper
- Fritz Kampers as dairy carriage driver
- Kurt Gerron as heavy boy
- Leopold von Ledebur as Police Captain
- Albert Paulig as Police Lieutenant
- Oreste Bilancia as Police Guard
- Lydia Potechina as Dicke Dame
- Sig Arno as young man
- Paul Morgan as railway conductor
