= The Island of Dreams =

1925 film

- Directed by: Paul L. Stein
- Written by: Paul Rosenhayn (novel and screenplay); Wilhelm Thiele
- Produced by: Paul Davidson
- Starring: Liane Haid; Harry Liedtke; Alfons Fryland
- Cinematography: Curt Courant
- Music by: Jos von Streletzky
- Production company: Davidson-Film
- Distributed by: UFA
- Release date: 11 March 1925
- Country: Germany
- Languages: Silent; German intertitles

The Island of Dreams (German: Die Insel der Träume) is a 1925 German silent film directed by Paul L. Stein and starring Liane Haid, Harry Liedtke, and Alfons Fryland.

The film's sets were designed by the art director Walter Reimann.

== Cast ==
- Liane Haid as Kterina Nikol, Prince's wife
- Harry Liedtke as John Jellicoe
- Alfons Fryland as Prince Alex Ermolow
- Paul Biensfeldt as Ivan
- Jaro Fürth as Baron Mediansky
- Robert Leffler as Nijin, servant
- Nikolai Malikoff as Duke Lushin
- Marinet Milner as Valerie, Baron's wife
- Alexander Murski as Judge
- Frida Richard as Anna Feodorowna, Katerina's mother
- Robert Scholz as Ernest Duval

== Bibliography ==
- Bock, Hans-Michael; Bergfelder, Tim, eds. (2009). The Concise Cinegraph: Encyclopaedia of German Cinema. New York: Berghahn Books. ISBN 978-1-57181-655-9.
