= Einer von Vielen =

Nazi propaganda film by Gernot Bock-Stieber

Einer von Vielen ("One of Many", 1936) was a Nazi propaganda film directed by Gernot Bock-Stieber.
