= The Girl with the Mask =

1922 German silent comedy film

- Directed by: Victor Janson
- Written by: Georg Jacoby; Robert Liebmann
- Produced by: Ossi Oswalda; Gustav von Koczian-Miskolczy
- Starring: Ossi Oswalda; Paul Biensfeldt; Hermann Thimig
- Cinematography: Erich Waschneck
- Production company: Ossi Oswalda-Film
- Distributed by: UFA
- Release date: 24 February 1922
- Country: Germany
- Languages: Silent; German intertitles

The Girl with the Mask (German: Das Mädel mit der Maske) is a 1922 German silent comedy film directed by Victor Janson and starring Ossi Oswalda, Paul Biensfeldt, and Hermann Thimig.

The film's sets were designed by the art director Kurt Richter.

== Cast ==
- Ossi Oswalda as Hothilde van Erlenkamp
- Paul Biensfeldt
- Hermann Thimig
- Victor Janson as Rodrigo Pampas, Regisseur
- Maria Reisenhofer
- Hans Junkermann
- Ellen Plessow
- Henry Bender
- Sophie Pagay

== Bibliography ==
- Bock, Hans-Michael; Bergfelder, Tim, eds. (2009). The Concise Cinegraph: Encyclopaedia of German Cinema. New York: Berghahn Books. ISBN 978-1-57181-655-9.
