= The Hunchback and the Dancer =

1920 film

- Directed by: F. W. Murnau
- Written by: Carl Mayer
- Cinematography: Karl Freund
- Distributed by: Helios Film
- Release date: 8 July 1920
- Running time: 50 minutes
- Country: Weimar Republic
- Languages: Silent; German intertitles

The Hunchback and the Dancer (German: Der Bucklige und die Tänzerin) is a 1920 silent German horror film directed by F. W. Murnau and photographed by Karl Freund. This is now considered to be a lost film. The film was written by Carl Mayer, who also wrote The Cabinet of Dr. Caligari (1920). Karl Freund later emigrated to Hollywood where he directed such classic horror films as The Mummy (1932) and Mad Love (1935). It premiered at the Marmorhaus in Berlin.

== Plot ==
A repulsive hunchback named James Wilton changes his relationship with women when he discovers a diamond mine in Java. A young woman named Gina, on the rebound from an earlier relationship, begins dating him. Later when she decides to break up with him and go back to her former lover, the hunchback manages to taint her with a poisonous substance that will kill anyone who kisses her. After two of her paramours die before her eyes, she finally catches on that he had contaminated her, and she decides to get revenge by luring the hunchback into kissing her himself.

== Cast ==
- Sascha Gura as Gina
- John Gottowt as James Wilton
- Paul Biensfeldt as Smith
- Henri Peters-Arnolds as Percy
- Bella Polini as Tänzerin
- Werner Krauss (unconfirmed)
- Lyda Salmonova (unconfirmed)
- Anna von Palen as Smith's mother

== See also ==
- List of lost films
