= Kaddish (1924 film) =

1924 film

- Directed by: Adolf E. Licho
- Written by: Alfred Fekete
- Produced by: Adolf E. Licho
- Starring: Lia Eibenschütz; Ilka Grüning; Rudolf Lettinger
- Cinematography: Willy Gaebel; Paul Lieberenz
- Production company: Licho-Film
- Distributed by: Licho-Film
- Release date: 26 September 1924
- Country: Germany
- Languages: Silent; German intertitles

Kaddish (German: Kaddisch) is a 1924 German silent drama film directed by Adolf E. Licho and starring Lia Eibenschütz, Ilka Grüning, and Rudolf Lettinger. Set in Poland, it takes its name from the Jewish prayer Kaddish.

The film's sets were designed by the art directors Walter Röhrig and Robert Herlth.

== Cast ==
- Lia Eibenschütz
- Ilka Grüning
- Rudolf Lettinger
- Lucie Höflich
- Erna Dehnhardt
- Emil Heyse
- Rudolf Hofbauer
- Manfred Laske
- Adolf E. Licho
- Agnes Mueller
- Carlos Zizold

== Bibliography ==
- Toffell, Gil (2018). Jews, Cinema and Public Life in Interwar Britain. London: Palgrave Macmillan. ISBN 978-1-137-56931-8.
