= Good and Evil (film) =

1921 film

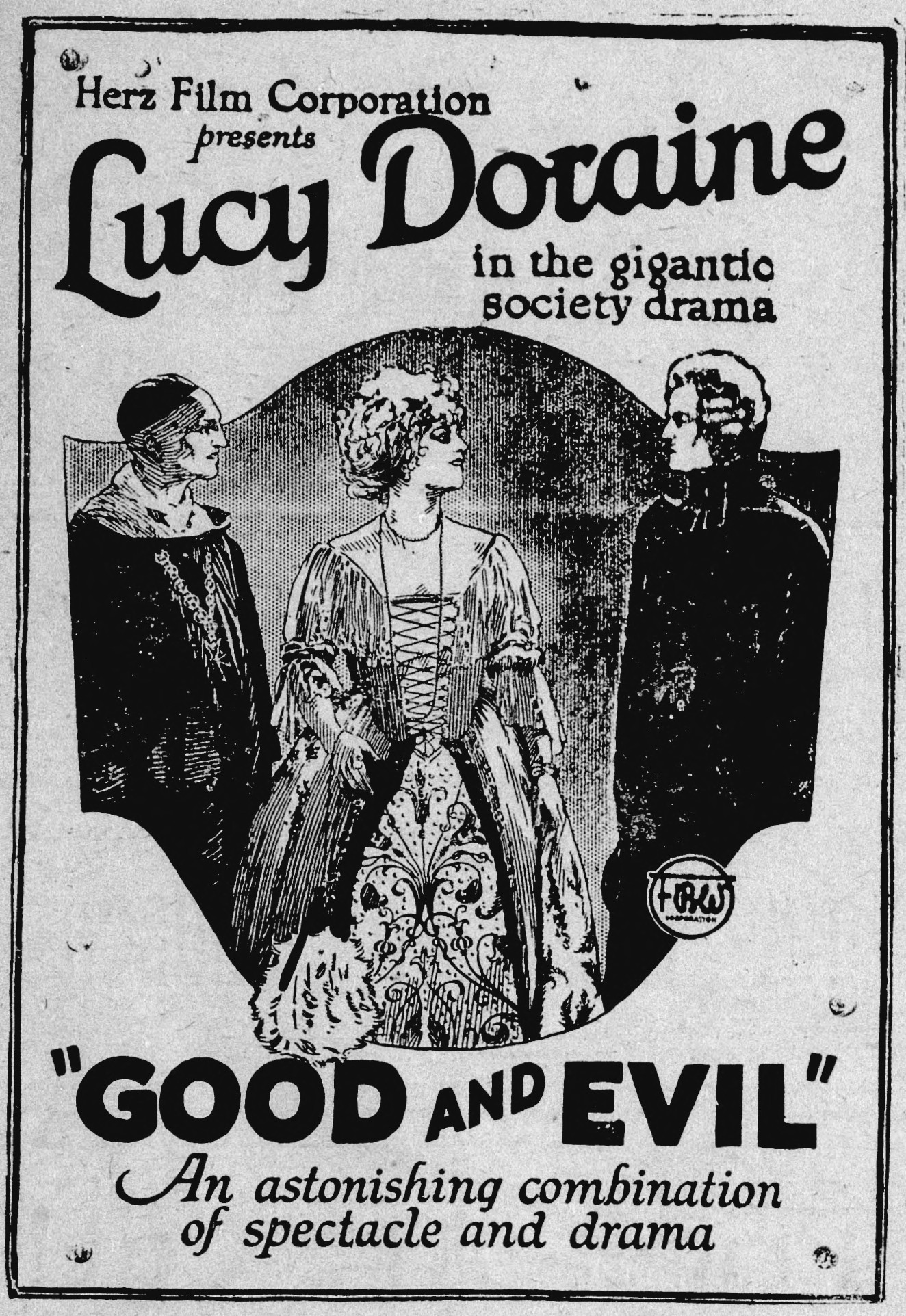
- Newspaper advertisement
- Directed by: Michael Curtiz
- Written by: Iván Siklósi
- Produced by: Sascha-Film
- Starring: Lucy Doraine; Alfons Fryland
- Cinematography: Gustav Ucicky
- Release date: 4 February 1921
- Running time: 50 minutes
- Country: Austria
- Language: Silent

Good and Evil (German: Herzogin Satanella) (Satan's Memoirs) is a 1921 Austrian silent film directed by Mihály Kertész. The screenplay was written by Iván Siklósi.

== Plot summary ==
As the film does not exist in its entirety (only 1,138 m of the original 2,350 m is still in existence), the plot cannot be described in its entirety. The femme fatale character of many faces, played by Lucy Doraine, entrances an escaped prisoner (Alphons Fryland). The former prisoner decides to leave her after dreaming of being with an American woman.

== Cast ==
- Lucy Doraine as Duchess Leda Orlonia/Marquise Rochefou/ unnamed Geisha.
- Alfons Fryland as The Prisoner/Count Guido.
- Ralph Ostermann as The Stranger.
- Magda Nagy as Bessie.
- Anton Tiller as Mario Barbarini/Cavalcanti.
