= The Great Opportunity =

1925 film

- Directed by: Lorand von Kabdebo
- Written by: Henry Koster; Lorand von Kabdebo
- Starring: Kurt Vespermann; Lia Eibenschütz; Colette Brettel; Ernst Winar
- Cinematography: Phil Jutzi; Schlesinger von Günz
- Production company: Stern-Film
- Release date: July 1925
- Country: Germany
- Languages: Silent; German intertitles

The Great Opportunity (German:Die große Gelegenheit) is a 1925 German silent film directed by Lorand von Kabdebo and starring Kurt Vespermann, Lia Eibenschütz and Colette Brettel. The production is notable as marking the filmmaking debut of Henry Koster, who co-wrote the screenplay. Koster would go on to become a top Hollywood film director.

== Cast ==
- Kurt Vespermann
- Lia Eibenschütz
- Colette Brettel
- Ernst Winar
- Harry Nestor
- Otz Tollen
- Kurt Born
- Rudolf Lettinger

== Bibliography ==
- Bock, Hans-Michael & Bergfelder, Tim. The Concise CineGraph. Encyclopedia of German Cinema. Berghahn Books, 2009.
