= Charlotte Somewhat Crazy =

1928 film

- Directed by: Adolf E. Licho
- Written by: Wilhelm Speyer (novel); Robert Liebmann
- Starring: Lya De Putti; Livio Pavanelli; Alfons Fryland
- Cinematography: Willy Hameister
- Music by: Willy Schmidt-Gentner
- Production company: Phoebus Film
- Distributed by: Phoebus Film
- Release date: 29 March 1928
- Running time: 91 minutes
- Country: Germany
- Languages: Silent; German intertitles

Charlotte Somewhat Crazy (German: Charlott etwas verrückt) is a 1928 German silent comedy film directed by Adolf E. Licho and starring Lya De Putti, Livio Pavanelli, and Alfons Fryland. The film's sets were designed by the art director Franz Schroedter. Location shooting took place in Nice.

== Cast ==
- Lya De Putti as Charlott Verloh
- Livio Pavanelli as Justus Verloh
- Alfons Fryland as Ludwig Holk
- Anton Pointner as Cecil
- André Mattoni as Stanley Fisher
- Olga Limburg as Cornelia
- Lotte Lorring as Camilla Blank
- Hertha von Walther as Hertha
- Lilian Weiß as Die Freundin

== Bibliography ==
- Goble, Alan (1999). The Complete Index to Literary Sources in Film. Berlin: Walter de Gruyter. ISBN 978-3-11-095194-3.
