= The Fifth Street =

1923 film

- Directed by: Martin Hartwig
- Written by: Hans Gaus
- Starring: Lucy Doraine; Ernst Hofmann; Willy Kaiser-Heyl
- Cinematography: Carl Hilbiber; Emil Schünemann; Theodor Sparkuhl
- Music by: Karl Krone
- Production company: Foreign-Film
- Release date: 26 April 1923
- Country: Germany
- Languages: Silent; German intertitles

The Fifth Street (German: Die fünfte Straße) is a 1923 German silent film directed by Martin Hartwig and starring Lucy Doraine, Ernst Hofmann and Willy Kaiser-Heyl. It was screened at the Marmorhaus in Berlin.

The film's sets were designed by the art director Alfred Columbus.

== Cast ==
- Lucy Doraine
- Ernst Hofmann
- Willy Kaiser-Heyl
- Erna Pabst
- Heinz Salfner
- Robert Scholz

== Bibliography ==
- Bock, Hans-Michael & Bergfelder, Tim. The Concise CineGraph. Encyclopedia of German Cinema. Berghahn Books, 2009.
