= The Searching Soul =

1925 film

- Directed by: Rudolf Biebrach
- Written by: Marie Luise Droop
- Produced by: Lucy Doraine
- Starring: Lucy Doraine
- Cinematography: Karl Attenberger; Josef Blasi
- Production company: Lucy Dorraine-Film
- Distributed by: Messtro-Film
- Release date: January 1925
- Country: Germany
- Languages: Silent; German intertitles

The Searching Soul (German: Die suchende Seele) is a 1925 German silent film directed by Rudolf Biebrach and starring Lucy Doraine.

The film's sets were designed by the art director Carl Ludwig Kirmse.

== Cast ==
- Lucy Doraine
- Emil Fenyő
- Georg H. Schnell
- Hermann Pfanz
- Olga Biedermann
- Otto Wernicke

== Bibliography ==
- Krautz, Alfred (1984). International Directory of Cinematographers, Set- and Costume Designers in Film. Vol. 4. Munich: Saur. ISBN 978-3-598-21434-9.
