= Arabella (1924 film) =

1924 film directed by Karl Grune

- Mae Marsh as Arabella
- Directed by: Karl Grune
- Written by: Hans Kyser
- Starring: Mae Marsh; Alfons Fryland; Fritz Rasp
- Cinematography: Karl Hasselmann
- Production company: Stern-Film
- Distributed by: Landlicht-Filmverleih
- Release date: 2 October 1924
- Country: Germany
- Languages: Silent; German intertitles

Arabella is a 1924 German silent drama film directed by Karl Grune and starring Mae Marsh, Alfons Fryland, and Fritz Rasp.

== Cast ==
- Mae Marsh as Arabella
- Alfons Fryland
- Fritz Rasp
- Jakob Tiedtke
- Fritz Kampers
- Jaro Fürth
- Hermann Picha
