= Sascha Gura =

German actress

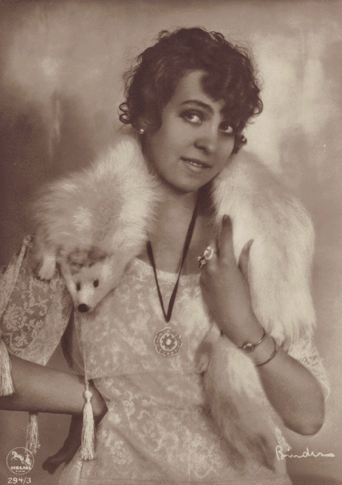
- Born: Eugenie Therese Gura; 9 June 1896; Munich, German Empire
- Died: 1 April 1946 (aged 49); Berlin, Germany
- Occupation: Actress
- Years active: 1919-1934 (film)
- Relatives: Hermann Gura (father); Eugen Gura Jr. (uncle); Eugen Gura (grandfather)

Sascha Gura (born Eugenie Therese Gura; 9 June 1896 – 1 April 1946) was a German stage and film actress active in the silent era.

== Selected filmography ==
- The Dance of Death (1919)
- The Hunchback and the Dancer (1920)
- The Prince of the Mountains (1921)
- The Devil and Circe (1921)
- The Love Affairs of Hector Dalmore (1921)
- Mignon (1922)
- Two Worlds (1922)
- Playing with Destiny (1924)
- Fever for Heights (1924)
- The Doomed (1924)
- Trenck (1932)

== Bibliography ==
- Hardt, Ursula. From Caligari to California: Erich Pommer's life in the International Film Wars. Berghahn Books, 1996.
