= Jakob Tiedtke =

German actor

- Born: 23 June 1875; Berlin, German Empire
- Died: 30 June 1960 (aged 85); West Berlin, West Germany
- Occupation: Actor
- Years active: 1914–1955

Jakob Karl Heinrich Wilhelm Tiedtke (23 June 1875 – 30 June 1960) was a German film actor. He appeared in more than 190 films between 1914 and 1955.

== Selected filmography ==
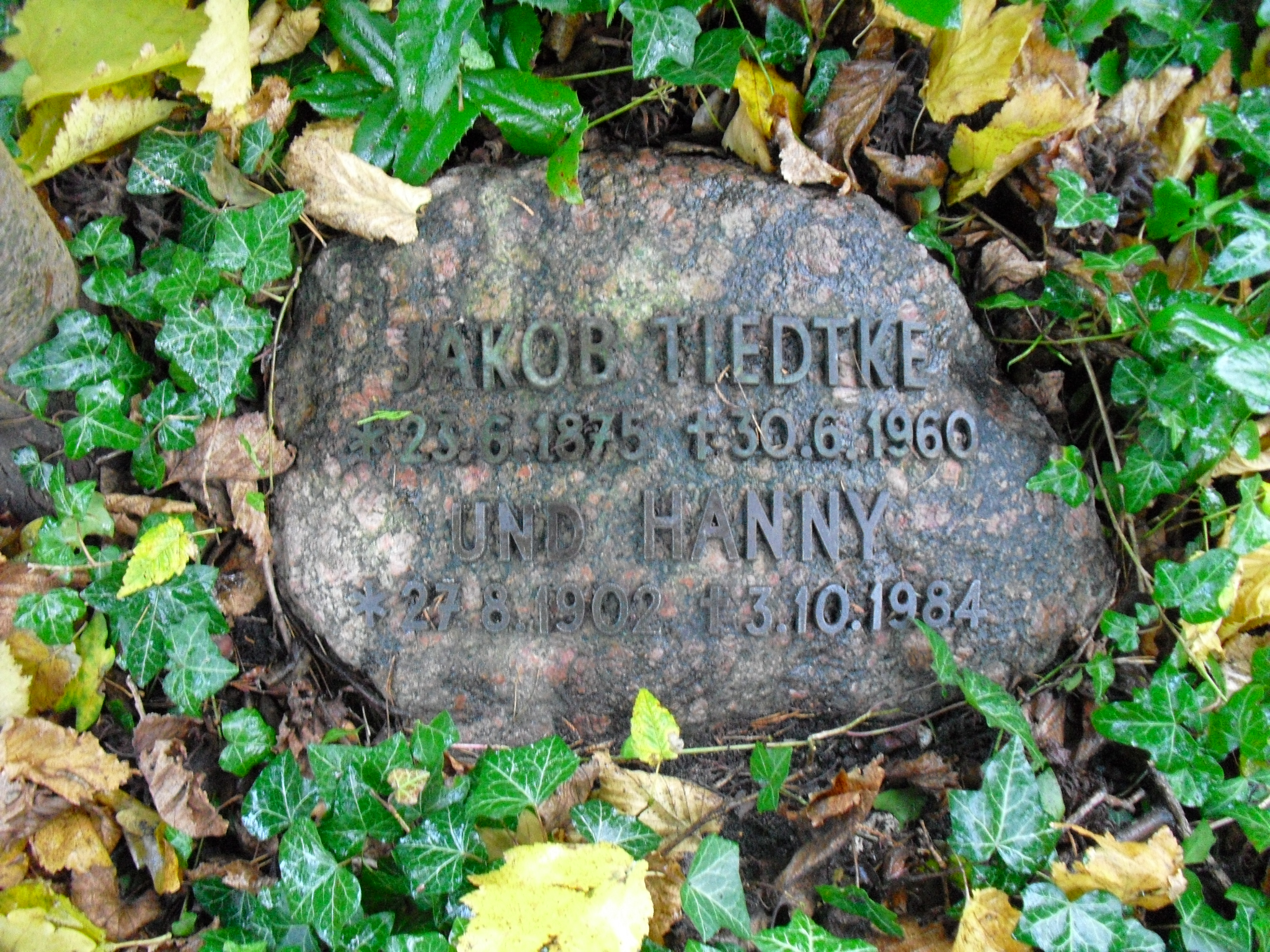
Jakob Tiedtke's grave in Friedhof Heerstraße, Berlin

- The Pied Piper of Hamelin (1918)
- The Doll (1919)
- The Galley Slave (1919)
- A Drive into the Blue (1919)
- Kohlhiesel's Daughters (1920)
- Sumurun (1920)
- Romeo and Juliet in the Snow (1920)
- Kohlhiesels Töchter (1920)
- Love at the Wheel (1921)
- Peter Voss, Thief of Millions (1921)
- The Stream (1922)
- Sins of Yesterday (1922)
- Maciste and the Chinese Chest (1923)
- The Expulsion (1923)
- The Ancient Law (1923)
- The Little Napoleon (1923)
- Carousel (1923)
- The Flame (1923)
- The Merchant of Venice (1923)
- Tragedy in the House of Habsburg (1924)
- Nanon (1924)
- Doctor Wislizenus (1924)
- Arabella (1924)
- Playing with Destiny (1924)
- By Order of Pompadour (1924)
- The Woman from Berlin (1925)
- Three Waiting Maids (1925)
- Hussar Fever (1925)
- A Waltz Dream (1925)
- Peter the Pirate (1925)
- Chamber Music (1925)
- The Mill at Sanssouci (1926)
- The Good Reputation (1926)
- The Man in the Fire (1926)
- The Armoured Vault (1926)
- We'll Meet Again in the Heimat (1926)
- The Uncle from the Provinces (1926)
- Only a Dancing Girl (1926)
- Nameless Woman (1927)
- Excluded from the Public (1927)
- The Transformation of Dr. Bessel (1927)
- Luther (1928)
- You Walk So Softly (1928)
- When the Guard Marches (1928)
- Mariett Dances Today (1928)
- Don Juan in a Girls' School (1928)
- The Lady from Argentina (1928)
- Give Me Life (1928)
- Strauss Is Playing Today (1928)
- Dear Homeland (1929)
- The Love of the Brothers Rott (1929)
- My Sister and I (1929)
- Pension Schöller (1930)
- Yorck (1931)
- That's All That Matters (1931)
- Inquest (1931)
- Berlin-Alexanderplatz (1931)
- The Golden Anchor (1932)
- My Friend the Millionaire (1932)
- Two Lucky Days (1932)
- Spoiling the Game (1932)
- Viennese Waltz (1932)
- A Mad Idea (1932)
- The Blue of Heaven (1932)
- The Testament of Cornelius Gulden (1932)
- An Auto and No Money (1932)
- Happy Days in Aranjuez (1933)
- When the Village Music Plays on Sunday Nights (1933)
- Season in Cairo (1933)
- A Thousand for One Night (1933)
- Young Dessau's Great Love (1933)
- Little Man, What Now? (1933)
- Idylle au Caire (1933)
- Her Highness the Saleswoman (1933)
- Gretel Wins First Prize (1933)
- The Sandwich Girl (1933)
- Count Woronzeff (1934)
- Love and the First Railway (1934)
- The Flower Girl from the Grand Hotel (1934)
- The Double (1934)
- A Girl Whirls By the World (1934)
- The Sun Rises (1934)
- Bashful Felix (1934)
- Decoy (1934)
- Love Conquers All (1934)
- The Double Fiance (1934)
- The Cousin from Nowhere (1934)
- Such a Rascal (1934)
- The Young Count (1935)
- Fresh Wind from Canada (1935)
- The Bird Seller (1935)
- Peter, Paul and Nanette (1935)
- Game on Board (1936)
- Savoy Hotel 217 (1936)
- Uncle Bräsig (1936)
- The Divine Jetta (1937)
- To New Shores (1937)
- So You Don't Know Korff Yet? (1938)
- The Immortal Heart (1939)
- New Year's Eve on Alexanderplatz (1939)
- The Journey to Tilsit (1939)
- Robert Koch (1939)
- Jud Süß (1940)
- Counterfeiters (1940)
- Mistress Moon (1941)
- The Way to Freedom (1941)
- The Swedish Nightingale (1941)
- The Buchholz Family (1944)
- That Was My Life (1944)
- Viennese Girls (1945)
- Chemistry and Love (1948)
- Hanna Amon (1948)
- Everything Will Be Better in the Morning (1948)
- Nothing But Coincidence (1949)
- The Secret of the Red Cat (1949)
- Hanna Amon (1951)
- It Began at Midnight (1951)
- Queen of the Night (1951)
- At the Well in Front of the Gate (1952)
- Not Afraid of Big Animals (1953)
- The Blue Hour (1953)
- Lady's Choice (1953)
- Love is Forever (1954)
- Emil and the Detectives (1954)
