= A Drive into the Blue =

1919 film directed by Rudolf Biebrach

- Directed by: Rudolf Biebrach
- Written by: Alfred Halm; Hanns Kräly; Robert Wiene
- Produced by: Paul Davidson
- Starring: Jakob Tiedtke; Franz Verdier; Henny PortenSophie Pagay Georg Alexander; Jakob Tiedtke
- Cinematography: Willy Gaebel
- Music by: Giuseppe Becce
- Production companies: Messter Film; PAGU
- Distributed by: UFA
- Release date: 21 November 1919
- Country: Germany
- Languages: Silent; German intertitles

A Drive into the Blue (German: Die Fahrt ins Blaue) is a 1919 German silent comedy film directed by Rudolf Biebrach and starring Henny Porten, Georg Alexander, and Jakob Tiedtke.

It was shot at the Tempelhof Studios in Berlin. The film's sets were designed by the art director Kurt Richter.

== Synopsis ==
A young female bank cashier wins a lottery whose prize is a car.

== Cast ==
- Jakob Tiedtke as Warenhausbesitzer Herr Paetz
- Franz Verdier as Abteilungschef
- Henny Porten as Wanda Lossen - Kassiererin
- Sophie Pagay as Frau Schulze - Ihre Wirtin
- Georg Alexander as Dr. Erich Fuld - Schriftsteller
- Herr Brögel as Alfred Bessel - sein Freund
- Robert Scholz as Ernst Holl - sein Freund
- Paul Biensfeldt as Simon - Diener Bei Fuld

== Bibliography ==
- Bock, Hans-Michael & Bergfelder, Tim. The Concise CineGraph. Encyclopedia of German Cinema. Berghahn Books, 2009.
