= Hunted Men (1924 film) =

1924 film

- German: Gehetzte Menschen
- Directed by: Erich Schönfelder
- Written by: Ernst B. Fey
- Produced by: Peter Ostermayr
- Starring: Lucy Doraine; Johannes Riemann; Hans Albers
- Cinematography: Franz Planer
- Production company: Messter Film
- Distributed by: Messtro-Film
- Release date: November 1924
- Country: Germany
- Languages: Silent; German intertitles

Hunted Men (German: Gehetzte Menschen) is a German silent film made in 1924 and directed by Erich Schönfelder and starring Lucy Doraine, Johannes Riemann and Hans Albers.

== Cast ==
- Lucy Doraine as Margit
- Johannes Riemann as Hans
- Hans Albers as Karl von Behn
- Rudolf Lettinger as F. A. Mertens
- Leonhard Haskel as Herr Garson
- Ilka Grüning as Frau Garson
- Hugo Werner-Kahle as Andrewowitsch Gosmol
- Trude Wessely as Lily, Karls Schwester
- Ferdinand Martini as A. S. Clasing
- Erich Schönfelder as Anno Labraiter
- Hilde Radney as Dekolletierte Dame
- Albert Paulig as Herr in der Loge
- Oscar Sabo as Rowdy
- Edmonde Guy as dancer
- Ernst van Duren as dancer
