= The Secret of the Mummy =

1921 film

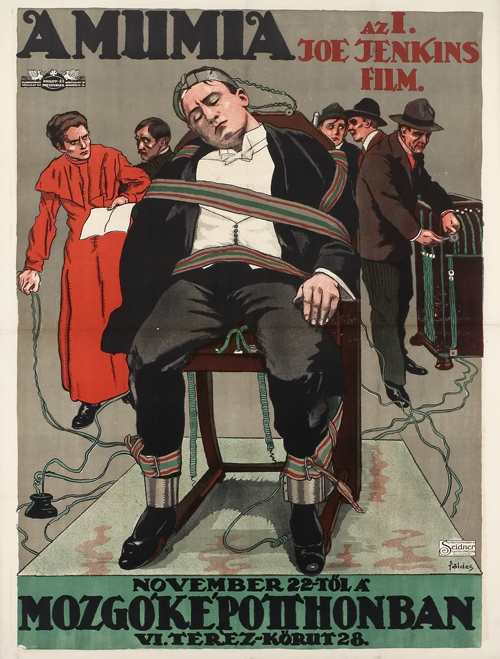
- Hungarian theatrical release poster
- Directed by: Victor Janson
- Written by: Josef Coböken; Paul Rosenhayn
- Produced by: Paul Davidson
- Starring: Ferdinand von Alten; Aud Egede-Nissen; Magnus Stifter
- Cinematography: Carl Drews
- Production company: PAGU
- Distributed by: UFA
- Release date: 18 February 1921
- Country: Germany
- Languages: Silent; German intertitles

The Secret of the Mummy (German: Das Geheimnis der Mumie) is a 1921 German silent crime film directed by Victor Janson and starring Ferdinand von Alten, Aud Egede-Nissen, and Magnus Stifter. It is part of the Joe Deebs detective series. Originally shot in 1916, it did not go on general release until 1921.

The film's sets were designed by the art director Kurt Richter.

== Cast ==
- Ferdinand von Alten as Joe Deebs
- Aud Egede-Nissen as Ellinor
- Magnus Stifter as Grag Lagerström
- Julia Serda as Lagerströms Frau
- Hannes Sturm as Prof. Stuart Kennedy
- Victor Janson as Wilcox
- Adolf Klein as Prof. Raleigh
- Erling Hanson as Harrison, Inspektor der Polizei
- Josef Rehberger as Ellinors Komplize
- Harry Nestor as Joseph Rohberger, Ellinors Komplize
- Kurt Rottenburg as Ellinors Komplize
- Karl Platen as Dr. Hollowan

== Bibliography ==
- Bock, Hans-Michael; Bergfelder, Tim, eds. (2009). The Concise Cinegraph: Encyclopaedia of German Cinema. New York: Berghahn Books. ISBN 978-1-57181-655-9.
