= I Liked Kissing Women (1926 film) =

1926 film

- German: Gern hab' ich die Frauen geküßt
- Directed by: Bruno Rahn
- Written by: Herbert Juttke; Georg C. Klaren
- Produced by: Bruno Rahn
- Starring: Alfons Fryland; Elisabeth Pinajeff; Evi Eva
- Cinematography: Ernst Krohn
- Music by: Felix Bartsch
- Production company: Rahn-Film-Produktion
- Distributed by: Pantomim-Film
- Release date: 13 December 1926
- Country: Germany
- Languages: Silent; German intertitles

I Liked Kissing Women (German: Gern hab' ich die Frauen geküßt) is a 1926 German silent film directed by Bruno Rahn and starring Alfons Fryland, Elisabeth Pinajeff, and Evi Eva.

The film's sets were designed by the art director Carl Ludwig Kirmse.

== Plot ==
Women are enamored by the violinist Heinz Reichert, whose charm captivates them effortlessly. He shares a close bond with Lisa Hartwig, the daughter of estate manager Franz Hartwig. Lisa's affection for Heinz knows no bounds, leading her to lend him a significant sum of money, acquired by pilfering from the cash register of the Schlettingen estate, overseen by her father.

== Cast ==
- Alfons Fryland as Heinz Reichert, ein junger Geiger
- Elisabeth Pinajeff as Cäcilie
- Evi Eva as Lisa, Hartwig's daughter
- Wilhelm Diegelmann as mayor
- Hermann Picha as Bräblich, Souffleur
- Paul Biensfeldt as Johann, valet
- Eduard von Winterstein as Franz Hartwig, Schloßverwalter
- Margarete Kupfer as Ottilie Lüdering, landlady
- Lissy Arna as Sybill Malva, Kokotte
- Robert Garrison
- Lili Schoenborn-Anspach
- John Mylong as Harald Brandt, Gutseleve
- Iwa Wanja as Hilde, Lüdering's daughter
- Carl Wallauer
- Fritz Beckmann as Eduardo Meretti, Theaterdirektor
- Li Hayda as Ly Delmont, Soubrette
