= Carousel (1923 film) =

1923 film directed by Dimitri Buchowetzki

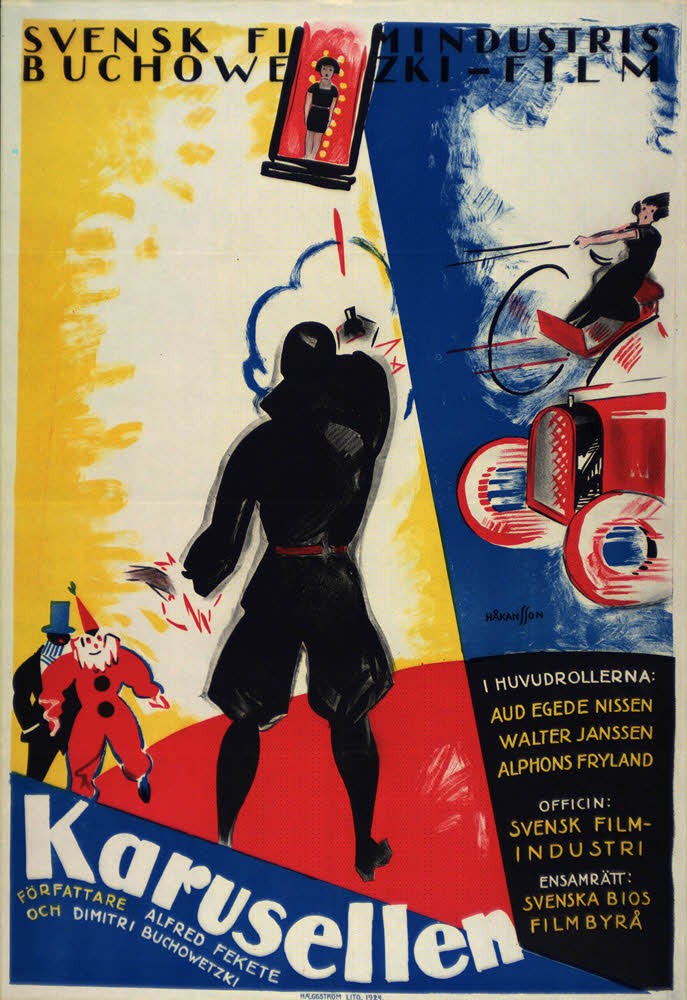
- The film's original 1923 poster
- Directed by: Dimitri Buchowetzki
- Written by: Alfred Fekete
- Starring: Walter Janssen; Aud Egede-Nissen; Alfons Fryland; Jakob Tiedtke
- Cinematography: Julius Jaenzon
- Production company: Svensk Filmindustri
- Distributed by: Svensk Filmindustri
- Release date: 1 October 1923
- Running time: 80 minutes
- Country: Sweden
- Languages: Silent; Swedish intertitles

Carousel (Swedish: Karusellen) is a 1923 Swedish silent drama film directed by Dimitri Buchowetzki and starring Walter Janssen, Aud Egede-Nissen, and Alfons Fryland. It was one of a number of circus-themed films released during the era. It was shot at the Johannisthal Studios in Berlin and on location in Sweden and Denmark.

== Cast ==
- Walter Janssen as Robert Benton, f.d. cirkusartist
- Aud Egede-Nissen as Blanche Benton, hans hustru
- Alfons Fryland as Raymond Duval
- Jakob Tiedtke as Philippsen, Blanches far
- Lydia Potechina as Fru Philippsen
- Ferry Sikla as Lazar, bankir
- Guido Herzfeld as Cirkusdirektör
- Rosa Valetti as Cirkusdirektörens fru
- Waldemar Pottier as Bentons son

== Bibliography ==
- Florin, Bo (2012). Transition and Transformation: Victor Sjostrom in Hollywood 1923–1930. Amsterdam: Amsterdam University Press. ISBN 978-90-8964-504-3.
