= Toni Dathe-Fabri =

German screenwriter and actress

- Occupation(s): Screenwriter, actress
- Years active: 1916–1930

Toni Dathe-Fabri was a German screenwriter and occasional actress active during the film industry's silent era.

== Selected filmography ==
- Wiener Herzen (1930)
- Freiheit in Fesseln (1930)
- Man schenkt sich Rosen, wenn man verliebt ist (1930)
- Jugendsünden (1929)
- Rinaldo Rinaldini (1927)
- Die Elenden der Straße (1926)
- Der kleine Herzog (1924)
- Bigamie (1922)
- Entblätterte Blüten (1920)
- Das Grauen (1920)
- Dem Teufel verschrieben (1919)
- Im Dienste der Liebe (1919)
- Eine tolle Kiste (1919)
- Mary Wood, die Tochter des Sträflings (1919)
- Erste Liebe: wahre Liebe (1918)
- Christa Hartungen (1917)
- Der Tolle Dammingen (1917)
- Der Schloßschrecken (1916)
- Ullas Weg (1916)
