= Victor Janson =

German actor (1884–1960)

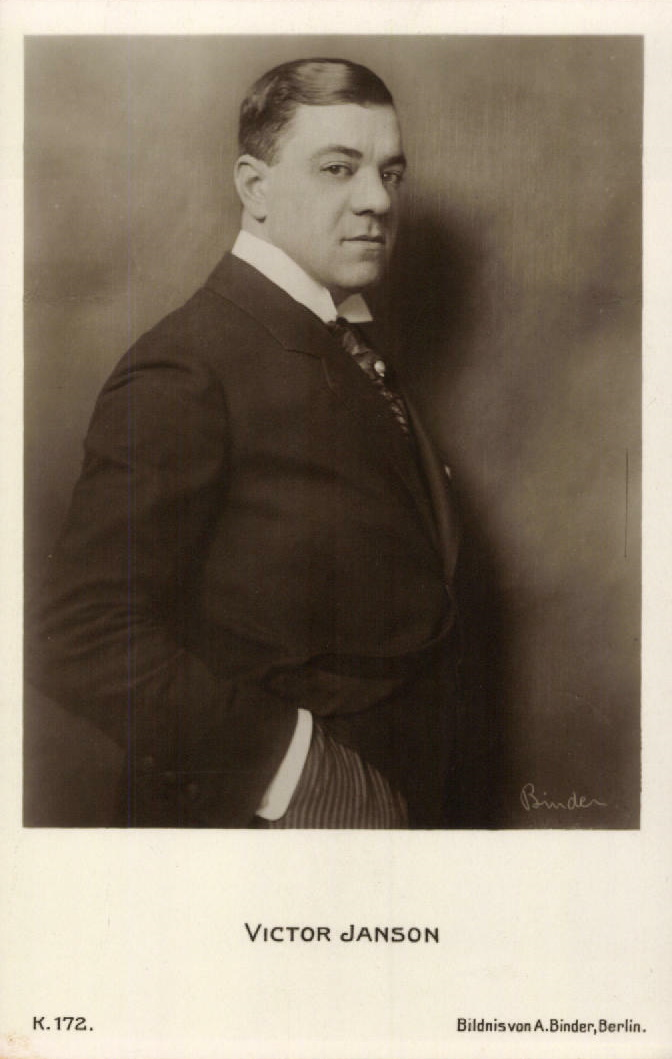
- Born: Victor Arthur Eduard Janson; 25 September 1884; Riga, Governorate of Livonia, Russian Empire (present day Latvia)
- Died: 29 June 1960 (aged 75); Schmargendorf, East Germany
- Other name: Viktor Janson
- Occupations: Actor, film director
- Years active: 1904–1954

Victor Arthur Eduard Janson (Latvian: Viktors Artūrs Eduards Jansons; 25 September 1884 – 29 June 1960) was a German stage and film actor and film director of Latvian ethnicity.

== Selected filmography ==
=== Actor ===
- Your Dearest Enemy (1916)
- When Four Do the Same (1917)
- Carmen (1918)
- The Ballet Girl (1918)
- The Seeds of Life (1918)
- Ferdinand Lassalle (1918)
- The Yellow Ticket (1918)
- My Wife, the Movie Star (1919)
- The Dagger of Malaya (1919)
- One or the Other (1919)
- Superstition (1919)
- The Teahouse of the Ten Lotus Flowers (1919)
- Countess Doddy (1919)
- The Howling Wolf (1919)
- The Merry Husband (1919)
- The Panther Bride (1919)
- The Oyster Princess (1919)
- The Woman at the Crossroads (1919)
- The Housing Shortage (1920)
- The Last Kolczaks (1920)
- The Secret of the Mummy (1921)
- Love at the Wheel (1921)
- The Wildcat (1921)
- The Girl with the Mask (1922)
- Das Milliardensouper (1923)
- Niniche (1925)
- Circus Romanelli (1926)
- The Ones Down There (1926)
- The Divorcée (1926)
- At the Edge of the World (1927)
- Holzapfel Knows Everything (1932)
- So You Don't Know Korff Yet? (1938)
- The Leghorn Hat (1939)
- Men Are That Way (1939)
- Stars of Variety (1939)
- The Unfaithful Eckehart (1940)
- The Way to Freedom (1941)
- We Make Music (1942)
- The Great Love (1942)
- Rembrandt (1942)
- Back Then (1943)
- Come Back to Me (1944)
- Dog Days (1944)
- Viennese Girls (1945)
- A Man Like Maximilian (1945)
- Peter Voss, Thief of Millions (1946)
- Ghost in the Castle (1947)
- The Court Concert (1948)
- Journey to Happiness (1948)
- Law of Love (1949)
- The Marriage of Figaro (1949)
- Heart of Stone (1950)
- Professor Nachtfalter (1951)
- Torreani (1951)
- The Prince of Pappenheim (1952)
- When the Heath Dreams at Night (1952)
- Hit Parade (1953)
- The Rose of Stamboul (1953)
- Such a Charade (1953)

=== Director ===
- The Yellow Ticket (1918)
- The Man of Action (1919)
- The Lady in Black (1920)
- The Secret of the Mummy (1921)
- Love at the Wheel (1921)
- The Girl with the Mask (1922)
- Das Milliardensouper (1923)
- Niniche (1925)
- The Dealer from Amsterdam (1925)
- The Queen of the Baths (1926)
- The Ones Down There (1926)
- Sword and Shield (co-director: Rudolf Dworsky, 1926)
- The Divorcée (co-director: Rudolf Dworsky, 1926)
- A Girl with Temperament (1928)
- Vienna, City of My Dreams (1928)
- The Circus Princess (1929)
- Schwarzwaldmädel (1929)
- The Black Domino (1929)
- Hungarian Nights (1929)
- Danube Waltz (1930)
- The Woman They Talk About (1931)
- The Beggar Student (1931)
- Once There Was a Waltz (1932)
- The Blue of Heaven (1932)
- Distorting at the Resort (1932)
- The Page from the Dalmasse Hotel (1933)
- The Tsarevich (1933)
- A Woman Who Knows What She Wants (1934)
- The Voice of Love (1934)
- The Blonde Carmen (1935)
- She and the Three (1935)
- Girls in White (1936)
- Rendezvous in Vienna (1936)
- The Coral Princess (1937)
- Who's Kissing Madeleine? (1939)
