= Alfons Fryland =

Austrian actor

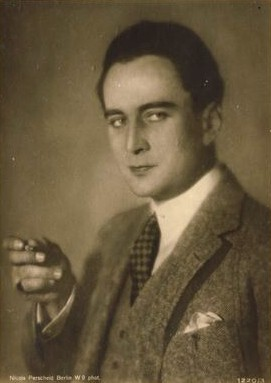
- Born: 1 May 1888; Vienna, Austria-Hungary (now Austria)
- Died: 29 November 1953 (aged 65); Graz, Austria
- Occupation: Actor
- Years active: 1921–1933

Alfons Fryland (1 May 1888 – 29 November 1953) was an Austrian film actor. He appeared in 47 films between 1921 and 1933. He was born in Vienna, Austria-Hungary (now Austria) and died in Graz, Austria.

== Selected filmography ==
- Labyrinth des Grauens (1921)
- The Eternal Struggle (1921)
- Kean (1921)
- Frau Dorothys Bekenntnis (1921)
- Herzogin Satanella (1921)
- Mrs. Tutti Frutti (1921)
- The Marriage of Princess Demidoff (1922)
- Prashna's Secret (1922)
- Lucrezia Borgia (1922)
- Between Evening and Morning (1923)
- Carousel (1923)
- Daisy (1923)
- The Chain Clinks (1923)
- Victim of Love (1923)
- Quo Vadis (1924)
- Arabella (1924)
- By Order of Pompadour (1924)
- The Creature (1924)
- Women You Rarely Greet (1925)
- The Island of Dreams (1925)
- The Woman without Money (1925)
- I Love You (1925)
- Fire of Love (1925)
- Hidden Fires (1925)
- The Ones Down There (1926)
- She Is the Only One (1926)
- Fedora (1926)
- I Liked Kissing Women (1926)
- The Son of Hannibal (1926)
- A Serious Case (1927)
- Make Up (1927)
- Charlotte Somewhat Crazy (1928)
- The Fate of the House of Habsburg (1928)
- The Chaste Coquette (1929)
- Roses Bloom on the Moorland (1929)
- Once at Midnight (1929)
- Ship in Distress (1929)
- A Storm Over Zakopane (1931)
- The Night of Decision (1931)
