= Ada van Roon =

German actor, screenwriter and film producer

Ada Roon
- Born: Adelheid Schneider; 4 May 1882; Berlin
- Died: 27 January 1953 (aged 70); Neukölln
- Known for: scriptwriter, actor
- Spouse: Gernot Bock-Stieber

Ada Roon born Adelheid Schneider (4 May 1882 – 27 January 1953) was a German actress, screenwriter and film producer. She moved from acting to screen writing to producing films.

== Life ==
Roon was born in Berlin with the name Adelheid Schneider. She had been working as a stage actress since her debut in 1902 at Berlin's Neue Theater under her birth name, both in Berlin and in the provinces (e.g. at the Deutsches Theater in Hannover). In Berlin she met the Austrian screenwriter and later director Gernot Bock-Stieber, whom she married on 16 October 1917 in Charlottenburg.

By his side and under the pseudonym Ada van Roon, she became a scriptwriter in 1919. In this capacity she wrote the manuscripts for numerous productions by Bock-Stieber. She also worked in her husband's production company. Their scripts included Paul Wegener's "World Without Weapons" which explored the idea of a weapon designed to defend and end war. The weapon is exploited and the message is that peace can only be achieved by consensus and cannot be imposed by technology.

Shortly after the onset of the sound film era, Ada van Roon retired from script writing and produced from 1931 with her own company Ada van Roon production cultural films. In 1934 she had to cease her cinematic activity.

Roon died in Neukölln in 1953.

== Films ==
- 1920: The haunt of life
- 1920: The invisible thief
- 1920: The rays of death
- 1921: The man in the closet (film reel)
- 1923: Paddy, the Foundling or: The Battle of the Four
- 1923: Escape from life
- 1923: The prince of the highway
- 1923: The fool and the others
- 1924: The house in the dark
- 1924: People in the fog
- 1924: altitude fever
- 1925: The handwriting of the Inca
- 1925: The unknown opponent
- 1927: World Without Weapons
- 1931: A Storm Over Zakopane (written) created in German and Polish

== Produced films ==
- 1931: Escape from everyday life
- 1932: Swimming artist
- 1932: The king of the animals and his clan
- 1933: ungulates
- 1933: water sports and water hiking
- 1933: May 1, 1933. The holiday of national labor
- 1933: German bells on the Rhine (also directing)
- 1934: In the spring of life
