= Paul Biensfeldt =

German-Jewish stage and film actor (1869-1933)

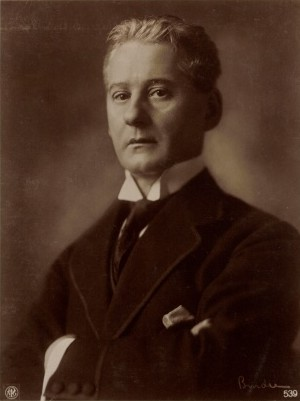
- Biensfeldt, ca. 1928
- Born: 4 March 1869; Berlin, Kingdom of Prussia
- Died: 2 April 1933 (aged 64); Berlin, Nazi Germany
- Occupation: Actor
- Years active: 1890–1932

Paul Biensfeldt (4 March 1869 – 2 April 1933) was a German-Jewish stage and film actor.

== Selected filmography ==
- The Canned Bride (1915)
- The Queen's Love Letter (1916)
- Countess Kitchenmaid (1918)
- The Blue Lantern (1918)
- The Adventure of a Ball Night (1918)
- Carmen (1918)
- The Victors (1918)
- My Wife, the Movie Star (1919)
- The Bodega of Los Cuerros (1919)
- The Spies (1919)
- Harakiri (1919)
- Prince Cuckoo (1919)
- Veritas Vincit (1919)
- A Drive into the Blue (1919)
- Mascotte (1920)
- Va banque (1920)
- Romeo and Juliet in the Snow (1920)
- Sumurun (1920)
- The Hunchback and the Dancer (1920)
- The Adventuress of Monte Carlo (1921)
- Peter Voss, Thief of Millions (1921)
- The Wildcat (1921)
- Dr. Mabuse the Gambler (1922)
- The Girl with the Mask (1922)
- The Flight into Marriage (1922)
- His Excellency from Madagascar (1922)
- Das Milliardensouper (1923)
- The Little Napoleon (1923)
- Bob and Mary (1923)
- The Stone Rider (1923)
- The Path to God (1924)
- The Little Duke (1924)
- By Order of Pompadour (1924)
- The Telephone Operator (1925)
- The Island of Dreams (1925)
- Fire of Love (1925)
- Flight Around the World (1925)
- Wood Love (1925)
- The Adventure of Mr. Philip Collins (1925)
- Cab No. 13 (1926)
- I Liked Kissing Women (1926)
- Sword and Shield (1926)
- The World Wants To Be Deceived (1926)
- Circus Romanelli (1926)
- The Fallen (1926)
- The Flight in the Night (1926)
- The Adventurers (1926)
- The Queen of Moulin Rouge (1926)
- Vienna, How it Cries and Laughs (1926)
- Carnival Magic (1927)
- Rhenish Girls and Rhenish Wine (1927)
- Svengali (1927)
- Behind the Altar (1927)
- A Serious Case (1927)
- Nameless Woman (1927)
- Suzy Saxophone (1928)
- A Girl with Temperament (1928)
- Dyckerpotts' Heirs (1928)
- Erzherzog Johann (1929)
- The Midnight Waltz (1929)
- Her Dark Secret (1929)
- Sprengbagger 1010 (1929)
- Archduke John (1929)
- Danube Waltz (1930)
- Hocuspocus (1930)
- A Student's Song of Heidelberg (1930)
- The Flute Concert of Sanssouci (1930)
- Student Life in Merry Springtime (1931)
- The Spanish Fly (1931)
- The Beggar Student (1931)
- My Friend the Millionaire (1932)
- Madame Makes Her Exit (1932)
- A Tremendously Rich Man (1932)
- Trenck (1932)
- The White Demon (1932)
- Marshal Forwards (1932)
- The Little Crook (1933)
- Tell Me Who You Are (1933)

== Bibliography ==
- Bach, Steven. Marlene Dietrich: Life and Legend. University of Minnesota Press, 2011.
- Eisner, Lotte H. The Haunted Screen: Expressionism in the German Cinema and the Influence of Max Reinhardt. University of California Press, 2008.
- Kreimeier, Klaus. The UFA Story: A Story of Germany's Greatest Film Company 1918–1945. University of California Press, 1999.
