= Gernot Bock-Stieber =

Austrian screenwriter and director known for Nazi propaganda films

- Born: 25 August 1892; Bad Gleichenberg
- Died: 7 December 1943 (aged 51); Berlin-Wilmersdorf
- Known for: scriptwriter, film director
- Spouse: Ada van Roon

Gernot Bock-Stieber (born 25 August 1892 – 7 December 1943) was an Austrian film director, screenwriter and documentary filmmaker.

== Early life ==
Born in Bad Gleichenberg, Styria, Austria-Hungary, Bock-Stieber attended the conservatory in Vienna after graduating from high school and trained as an actor with Josef Kainz. He also attended the graphics teaching and research institute. Even before the outbreak of the First World War, Bock-Stieber had completed training as a photographer and movie camera operator.

Based in Germany since 1909, he played mainly in theaters in cities in the Rhine region including Cologne, Bonn and Düsseldorf, and finally went to Berlin, where he appeared as an actor at the Luisen Theater and was hired by the film production company Duskes Film as an assistant director. He served in the First World War from 1915 to 1918, and was sporadically active during that period as a screenwriter and journalist.

== Film directing career ==
In 1919 Bock-Stieber began working as a director. In March 1920 he founded Europa-Film-Co. GmbH together with Georg Paul Aderholdt. He later named the company Epro-Film (abbreviation for Europe Production). His early works included several episodes of the Mac Wood series, centered around the character of Mac Wood, a smart, adventurous detective and jack of all trades. The screenplay for his productions was regularly written by Ada van Roon, Bock-Stieber's wife since 1917. Alexander von Antalffy played the leading role in these films.

== Work as Nazi propagandist ==
From the late 1920s Bock-Stieber was unable to land any more mainstream directing contracts. He then concentrated on producing screenplays and, since the advent of sound films, was almost exclusively given the opportunity to direct Nazi propaganda films, notoriously including Victims of the Past (1937; German: Opfer der Vergangenheit), a film that propagated the forced sterilization of people with hereditary disorders.

His other films for the Nazi regime were Einer von Vielen ("One of Many", 1936), Tante Inges Garten ("Aunt Inge's Garden", 1937), and Für jeden etwas ("Something for Everyone", 1937).

In the last years of his life, Bock-Stieber was in constant trouble with the authorities. In 1940 there were proceedings for expulsion from the film department of the Reich Film Chamber for alleged film financing contacts with Jews. He was also insolvent and had to make a debtor's asset disclosure.

Gernot Bock-Stieber died on 7 December 1943 in Berlin-Wilmersdorf, Germany, at the age of 51.
