= Honour Thy Mother =

1928 film

- Directed by: Paul L. Stein
- Written by: Johannes Elgin
- Starring: Mary Carr; Walter Rilla; Anita Dorris
- Cinematography: Jack Hermann; Friedrich Weinmann
- Production company: Deutsche Film Union
- Distributed by: Deutsche First National Pictures
- Release date: 5 October 1928
- Country: Germany
- Languages: Silent; German intertitles

Honour Thy Mother (German: Ehre deine Mutter) is a 1928 German silent film directed by Paul L. Stein and starring Mary Carr, Walter Rilla and Anita Dorris.

The film's sets were designed by the art director Leopold Blonder. It was made by the German subsidiary of First National Pictures.

== Cast ==
- Mary Carr as Die Mutter
- Walter Rilla as Fritz - ihr Sohn
- Anita Dorris as Erna - die Nichte
- Jakob Tiedtke as Theodor Krause
- Max Gülstorff as Dr. Heim
- Leopold Kramer as Professor Meingart
- Valerie Boothby as Elise - seine Tochter
