= The Three Women of Urban Hell =

1928 film

- Directed by: Jaap Speyer
- Written by: Vicki Baum (novel and screenplay)
- Starring: Mona Maris; Fred Doederlein; Hilde Maroff
- Cinematography: Willy Hameister
- Music by: Giuseppe Becce
- Production company: Terra Film
- Distributed by: Terra Film
- Release date: 4 December 1928
- Country: Germany
- Languages: Silent; German intertitles

The Three Women of Urban Hell (German: Die drei Frauen von Urban Hell) is a 1928 German silent film directed by Jaap Speyer and starring Mona Maris, Fred Doederlein, and Hilde Maroff. It was shot at the Marienfelde Studios of Terra Film in Berlin. The film's art direction was by Hans Jacoby.

== Cast ==
- Mona Maris as May Lyssenhop
- Fred Doederlein as Hell
- Hilde Maroff as Puck
- Mia Pankau as Kamilla Bojan
- Angelo Ferrari as Graf Békessy
- Oreste Bilancia as Dr. Mayreder
- Lotte Stein as Mayrders Frau
- Hilde von Stolz as Anuschka
- Max Maximilian as Bademeister
- Gyula Szőreghy

== See also ==
- Lake of Ladies (1934)

== Bibliography ==
- Nelmes, Jill; Selbo, Jule, eds. (2015). Women Screenwriters: An International Guide. Basingstoke: Palgrave Macmillan. ISBN 978-1-137-31237-2.
