= The Schorrsiegel Affair =

1928 film

- Directed by: Jaap Speyer
- Written by: Felix Stein
- Based on: The Schorrsiegel Affair by Fred Andreas
- Starring: Bernhard Goetzke; Walter Rilla; Anita Dorris; Helga Molander
- Cinematography: Nicolas Farkas
- Music by: Walter Ulfig
- Production company: Terra Film
- Distributed by: Terra Film
- Release date: 7 April 1928
- Country: Germany
- Languages: Silent; German intertitles

The Schorrsiegel Affair (German: Die Sache mit Schorrsiegel) is a 1928 German silent film directed by Jaap Speyer that featured Bernhard Goetzke, Walter Rilla and Anita Dorris. It was adapted from a novel of the same title by Fred Andreas. It was shot at the Terra Studios in Berlin. The film's art direction was by Hans Jacoby.

== Cast ==
- Bernhard Goetzke as Professor de Geer
- Walter Rilla as Bernhard Benda
- Anita Dorris as Doortje, Pflegetochter de Geers
- Helga Molander as Frau van der Wal
- Theodor Loos as Herr van der Wal
- Alfred Gerasch as Schorrsiegel
- Ernst Pröckl as Donding
- Hermann Vallentin as Isaak
- Emil Heyse as Polizeikommissar

== Bibliography ==
- Kreimeier, Klaus (1999). The Ufa Story: A History of Germany's Greatest Film Company, 1918–1945. Berkeley: University of California Press. ISBN 978-0-520-22069-0.
