= Miss Chauffeur =

1928 film

- Directed by: Jaap Speyer
- Written by: Curt J. Braun; Max Ehrlich; Walter Jonas
- Starring: Mady Christians; Johannes Riemann; Lotte Lorring
- Cinematography: Arpad Viragh
- Music by: Walter Ulfig
- Production company: Terra Film
- Distributed by: Terra Film
- Release date: 20 June 1928
- Country: Germany
- Languages: Silent; German intertitles

Miss Chauffeur (German: Fräulein Chauffeur) is a 1928 German comedy film directed by Jaap Speyer and starring Mady Christians, Johannes Riemann, and Lotte Lorring. It was shot at the Terra Studios in Berlin. The film's sets were designed and part directed by the art director Hans Jacoby.

== Cast ==
- Mady Christians as Steffi Walker
- Johannes Riemann as Werner Heywoldt
- Lotte Lorring as Ellen
- Hilde Maroff as Heywoldts Stubenmädchen
- Fritz Kampers as Heywoldts Gärtner
- Trude Lehmann as Heywoldts Köchin

== Bibliography ==
- Bock, Hans-Michael; Bergfelder, Tim, eds. (2009). The Concise Cinegraph: Encyclopaedia of German Cinema. New York: Berghahn Books. ISBN 978-1-57181-655-9.
