= Tannenberg (film) =

1932 film

- Directed by: Heinz Paul
- Written by: Paul Oskar Höcker; Georg von Viebahn; Heinz Paul
- Produced by: Lazar Wechsler
- Starring: Hans Stüwe; Käthe Haack; Jutta Sauer; Hertha von Walther
- Cinematography: Georg Bruckbauer; Viktor Gluck
- Music by: Ernst Erich Buder
- Production companies: Paul-Filmproduktion; Praesens-Film
- Distributed by: UFA
- Release date: 8 September 1932
- Running time: 105 minutes
- Countries: Germany; Switzerland
- Language: German
- Budget: 500,000 RM (equivalent to 2 million 2021 €)

Tannenberg is a 1932 Swiss–German war film directed by Heinz Paul and starring Hans Stüwe, Käthe Haack and Jutta Sauer. The film is based on the 1914 Battle of Tannenberg during the First World War. It focuses on German landowner Captain von Arndt and his family.

== Production ==
It was shot on location in East Prussia and at Terra Film's Marienfelde Studios and UFA's Babelsberg Studios during the summer of 1932. It cost over half a million reichsmarks to make and employed 8,000 people. The film focused on a notable German victory and was in sharp contrast to recent anti-war films such as Westfront 1918. Tannenberg served as a national symbol in Germany, and was re-issued in 1936 during the Nazi era. The Producers made an effort to make the film as historically accurate as possible, and portrayed the Russian commanders respectfully. It was due to be released on 26 August 1932, the eighteenth anniversary of the battle, but was delayed by the censors acting on a request from the German President Paul von Hindenburg who was unhappy with his portrayal in the film and the premiere was pushed back until certain scenes had been cut.

== Cast ==
- Hans Stüwe as Gutsbesitzer Rittmeister von Arndt
- Käthe Haack as Grete von Arndt
- Jutta Sauer as Inge von Arndt
- Hertha von Walther as Schwägerin Sonja
- Erika Dannhoff as Schwägerin Lita
- Hannelore Benzinger as Lisbeth, Arndt, Magd
- Karl Klöckner as Gutsverwalter Puchheiten
- Franziska Kinz as Gutsfrau Frau Puchheiten
- Rudolf Klicks as Fritz Puchheiten
- Alfred Döderlein as Leutnant Schmidz
- Wolfgang Staudte as Husar Franke
- Karl Körner as Paul von Hindenburg
- Henry Pleß as Generalmajor Ludendorff
- Hans Mühlhofer as Oberstleutnant Hoffmann
- Friedrich Franz Stampe as Generalmajor Grünert
- Alfred Gerasch as Generalmajor Graf von Waldensee
- Graf Schönborn as Hauptmann Fleischmann von Theißruck
- Edgar Boltz as General von Scholz
- Georg H. Schnell as General der Kavallerie Shilinski
- Sigurd Lohde as General der Kavallerie Samsonow
- Carl Auen as Generalmajor Postowski
- Georg Schmieter as Oberst Gerwe
- Aruth Wartan as Stabstrompeter Kupschik
- Fritz Arno Wagner as Militärattaché Oberst Knox
- Ernst Pröckl as General der Artillerie Martos
- Erwin Suttner as General der Infanterie Kljujew
- Fritz Alberti as Generalleutnant Mingin
- Valy Arnheim as Oberstleutnant Fjedorow
- Viktor de Kowa as Rittmeister Fürst Wolgoff
- Friedrich Ettel as Kosakenwachtmeister

== Bibliography ==
- Kester, Bernadette. Film Front Weimar: Representations of the First World War in German films of the Weimar Period (1919-1933). Amsterdam University Press, 2003. ISBN 978-90-5356-598-8.
- Von der Goltz, Anna. Hindenburg: Power, Myth, and the Rise of the Nazis. Oxford University Press, 2009. ISBN 978-0-19-957032-4.
