= Heimweh =

Heimweh may refer to:

- A German word roughly equivalent to homesickness
- Heimweh (1927 film), a silent German film
- Heimweh (1937 film), a German film
