= Queen Louise (1927 film) =

1927 film directed by Karl Grune

- Directed by: Karl Grune
- Written by: Ludwig Berger; Max Glass
- Produced by: Max Glass
- Starring: Mady Christians; Mathias Wieman; Anita Dorris; Hedwig Molander
- Cinematography: Arpad Viragh
- Music by: Walter Ulfig
- Production company: Terra Film
- Distributed by: Terra Film
- Release dates: 22 December 1927 (Part I); 16 January 1928 (Part II)
- Country: Germany
- Languages: Silent; German intertitles

Queen Louise (German: Königin Luise) is a German silent historical film directed by Karl Grune and starring Mady Christians, Mathias Wieman, and Anita Dorris. It was released in two separate parts slightly less than a month from each other in December 1927 and January 1928. It commenced a series of historical epics directed by Grune. It was shot partly at the Terra Studios in Berlin. The film's sets were designed by the art director Hans Jacoby.

The film portrays the short life of Louise of Mecklenburg-Strelitz, wife of the Prussian monarch Frederick William III.

== Cast ==
- Mady Christians as Louise of Mecklenburg-Strelitz
- Mathias Wieman as William III
- Anita Dorris as Frederica of Mecklenburg-Strelitz
- Hedwig Molander as Princess Radziwill
- Adele Sandrock as Countess Voss
- Hans Adalbert Schlettow as Prince Louis Ferdinand
- Hedwig Wangel as Princess von Hessen-Darmstadt
- Theodor Loos as Count Hardenberg
- Charles Vanel as Napoleon
- Auguste Prasch-Grevenberg as Queen-Consort Elisabeth Christine von Braunschweig
- Alfred Döderlein as Prince Louis
- Hans Mierendorff as King Frederick William II.
- Lotte Lorring as Madame Ritz
- Antonie Jaeckel as Gelieu
- Karl Elzer as Adjutant Köckeritz
- Egon von Jordan as Russia Tsar Alexander
- Alfred Gerasch as Minister Talleyrand
- Ferdinand von Alten as Bertrand
- Hans Wassmann as Count Haugwitz
- Eduard Rothauser as Duke von Mecklenburg
- Max Pohl as Prince Blücher
- Emil Heyse as Dr. Hufeland

== Bibliography ==
- Bock, Hans-Michael; Bergfelder, Tim, eds. (2009). The Concise Cinegraph: Encyclopaedia of German Cinema. New York: Berghahn Books. ISBN 978-1-57181-655-9.
- Kreimeier, Klaus (1999). The Ufa Story: A History of Germany's Greatest Film Company, 1918–1945. Berkeley: University of California Press. ISBN 978-0-520-22069-0.
