= Svengali (1927 film) =

1927 film

- Directed by: Gennaro Righelli
- Written by: Max Glass
- Based on: Trilby; 1894 novel by George du Maurier
- Produced by: Max Glass
- Starring: Paul Wegener; Anita Dorris; André Mattoni; Teddy Bill; Hans Brausewetter
- Cinematography: Arpad Viragh
- Music by: Walter Ulfig
- Production company: Terra Film
- Distributed by: Terra Film
- Release date: 7 September 1927
- Running time: 104 minutes
- Country: Germany
- Languages: Silent; German intertitles

Svengali is a 1927 German silent drama film directed by Gennaro Righelli and starring Paul Wegener, Anita Dorris and André Mattoni. It was produced and written by Max Glass, an adaptation of the 1894 George du Maurier novel Trilby. This is one of the adaptations of the novel that shifts the focus of the story more to Svengali, since at this time anti-Semitism was on the rise in Germany, and Svengali was portrayed as an evil Jew in the film.

German actress Anita Dorris appeared in very few other silent films, none of which are well known today. Italian director Righelli on the other hand directed numerous films during his career, although his main claim to fame today is that he was the grandfather of Italian horror film director Sergio Martino. Svengali was remade in 1931 as a sound film starring John Barrymore.

== Plot ==
A pretty young artist's model named Trilby falls under the spell of a mesmerist named Svengali who turns her into a leading opera singer with no will of her own. German horror film star Paul Wegener plays Svengali, who uses hypnosis to enslave the beautiful young Trilby, preventing her marriage to her fiancée even though he cannot make her love him. The strain of controlling her and shaping her into an opera star takes a toll on both of them, and when Svengali dies suddenly, Trilby inexplicably dies with him.

== Cast ==
- Paul Wegener as Svengali
- Anita Dorris as Trilby
- André Mattoni as Billy (artist)
- Teddy Bill as Leard (artist)
- Hans Brausewetter as Taffy (artist)
- Paul Biensfeldt as Martine (model)
- Alexander Granach as Geiger Gecko
- Alice Torning as Martine's wife
- Hertha von Walther as Sascha (dancer)
- Irma Green as Student
- Hermann Picha as Landlord of cafe
- Emil Heyse

== Production ==
It was shot at the Terra Studios in Berlin with sets designed by the art director Hans Jacoby. Svengali had previously been filmed in 1914 as an Austrian film directed by Luise Kolm and Jacob Fleck. There were also three notable earlier silent film versions of Trilby...Trilby (1914 film), Trilby (1915 film), and again Trilby (1923 film).

== Bibliography ==
- Isenberg, Noah. Weimar Cinema: An Essential Guide to Classic Films of the Era. Columbia University Press, 2009.
