= Homesick (1927 film) =

1927 film

- Directed by: Gennaro Righelli
- Written by: Max Glass
- Produced by: Max Glass
- Starring: Mady Christians; William Dieterle; Ida Wüst; Lydia Potechina
- Cinematography: Arpad Viragh
- Music by: Walter Ulfig
- Production company: Terra Film
- Distributed by: Terra Film
- Release date: 21 October 1927
- Running time: 107 minutes
- Country: Germany
- Languages: Silent; German intertitles

Homesick (German: Heimweh) is a 1927 German silent drama film directed by Gennaro Righelli and starring Mady Christians, William Dieterle, and Ida Wüst. It was filmed at the Terra Studios in Berlin. The film's art direction was by Hans Jacoby. It is set among a group of Russian émigrés living in Paris.

== Cast ==
- Mady Christians as Fürstin Lydia Trubezkoj
- William Dieterle as Iwan Bogdanow, Verwalter
- Ida Wüst as Madame Kamenskaja
- Lydia Potechina as Madame Lorrain
- Simone Vaudry as Jeanette, ihre Tochter
- Auguste Prasch-Grevenberg as Alte russische Baronin
- Jean Murat
- Alexander Murski
- Livio Pavanelli

== Bibliography ==
- Bergfelder, Tim & Bock, Hans-Michael. The Concise Cinegraph: Encyclopedia of German. Berghahn Books, 2009.
- Gibson, Hamilton Bertie. Hans Eysenck: the man and his work. Owen, 1981.
