= Mania (1918 film) =

- Directed by: Eugen Illés
- Written by: Hans Brennert
- Produced by: Paul Davidson
- Starring: Pola Negri; Arthur Schröder
- Cinematography: Eugen Illés
- Production company: PAGU
- Distributed by: UFA
- Release date: 8 November 1918
- Running time: 85 minutes
- Country: Germany
- Languages: Silent; German intertitles

Mania (German: Mania. Die Geschichte einer Zigarettenarbeiterin) is a 1918 German silent drama film directed by Eugen Illés and starring Pola Negri, Arthur Schröder and Ernst Wendt.

The film's sets were designed by the art director Paul Leni.

== Cast ==
- Pola Negri as Mania - Zigarettenarbeiterin
- Arthur Schröder as Hans van der Hof, Tondichter
- Ernst Wendt as Kunstmaler
- Werner Hollmann as Morelli, reicher Kunstmäcen

== Bibliography ==
- Mariusz Kotowski. Pola Negri: Hollywood's First Femme Fatale. University Press of Kentucky, 2014.
