= Viktor Gluck =

German cinematographer

- Occupation: Cinematographer
- Years active: 1923–1934 (film)

Viktor Gluck (1 September 1897 in Brno, Austria-Hungary − 1957 in London) was a German cinematographer who worked on 33 films between 1923 and 1934.

== Selected filmography ==
- The Hell of Barballo (1923)
- Gulliver's Travels (1924)
- The Life of Beethoven (1927)
- Schweik in Civilian Life (1927)
- Robert and Bertram (1928)
- Marriage (1928)
- The Girl from the Provinces (1929)
- Marriage in Name Only (1930)
- The Other Side (1931)
- Durand Versus Durand (1931)
- Circus Life (1931)
- Student Life in Merry Springtime (1931)
- A Woman Branded (1931)
- Marshal Forwards (1932)
- Tannenberg (1932)

== Bibliography ==
- Kester, Bernadette. Film Front Weimar: Representations of the First World War in German Films of the Weimar Period (1919-1933). Amsterdam University Press, 2003.
