= The Queen's Love Letter =

1916 film directed by Robert Wiene

- Directed by: Robert Wiene
- Produced by: Oskar Messter
- Starring: Henny Porten; Arthur Schröder; Rudolf Biebrach
- Cinematography: Karl Freund
- Music by: Giuseppe Becce
- Production company: Messter Film
- Distributed by: Hansa Film
- Release date: 30 March 1916
- Country: Germany
- Languages: Silent; German intertitles

The Queen's Love Letter (German: Der Liebesbrief der Königin) is a 1916 German silent comedy film directed by Robert Wiene and starring Henny Porten, Arthur Schröder and Rudolf Biebrach. Its story is unconnected with Wiene's film The Queen's Secretary, which was released the same year.

== Cast ==
- Henny Porten
- Arthur Schröder
- Rudolf Biebrach
- Paul Biensfeldt
- Frida Richard
- Heinrich Schroth

== Bibliography ==
- Jung, Uli & Schatzberg, Walter. Beyond Caligari: The Films of Robert Wiene. Berghahn Books, 1999.
