= Anita Dorris =

German actress

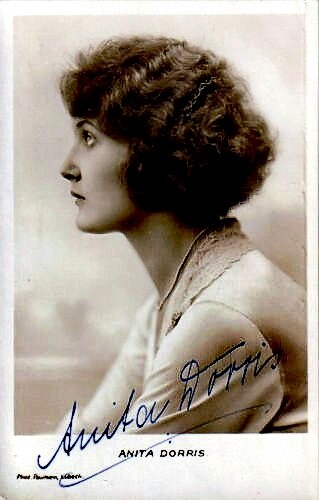
- Born: 21 December 1903; Lübeck, German Empire
- Died: 24 December 1993 (aged 90); Vienna, Austria
- Occupations: Actress, Motion pictures
- Years active: 1926-1931
- Spouse: E. W. Emo
- Children: Maria Emo

Anita Dorris (December 21, 1903 – December 24, 1993) was a German actress of the Silent era. She played the role of Trilby in the 1927 film Svengali. She was the mother of Maria Emo who also became an actress.

== Selected filmography ==
- Frau Sopherl vom Naschmarkt (1926)
- The Mill at Sanssouci (1926)
- Vienna - Berlin (1926)
- When I Came Back (1926)
- Fedora (1926)
- The Trumpets are Blowing (1926)
- The White Horse Inn (1926)
- Svengali (1927)
- Bigamie (1927)
- Queen Louise (1927)
- Love Affairs (1927)
- The Schorrsiegel Affair (1928)
- Behind Monastery Walls (1928)
- Honour Thy Mother (1928)
- The Girl from the Provinces (1929)
- Eros in Chains (1929)
- Alimente (1930)
- Gigolo (1930)
- Student Life in Merry Springtime (1931)

== Bibliography ==
- Thomas, Douglas A. The early history of German motion pictures, 1895-1935. Thomas International, 1999.
