= Love Affairs (1927 film) =

1927 film

- Directed by: Jaap Speyer
- Written by: Max Glass
- Starring: Anita Dorris; Anton Pointner; Albert Steinrück
- Cinematography: Fritz Arno Wagner
- Music by: Felix Bartsch
- Production company: Terra Film
- Distributed by: Terra Film
- Release date: February 1927
- Country: Germany
- Languages: Silent; German intertitles

Love Affairs (German: Liebeshandel) is a 1927 German silent film directed by Jaap Speyer and starring Anita Dorris, Anton Pointner, and Albert Steinrück.

The film's sets were designed by the art director Alfred Junge.

== Cast ==
- Anita Dorris
- Anton Pointner
- Albert Steinrück
- Trude Hesterberg
- Traute Carlsen
- Hans Mierendorff
- Theodor Loos
- Hans Brausewetter
- Sophie Pagay
- Eva Speyer

== Bibliography ==
- Parish, James Robert; Canham, Kingsley (1976). Film Directors Guide: Western Europe. Metuchen, NJ: Scarecrow Press. ISBN 978-0-8108-0908-6.
