= Alfred Gerasch =

German actor

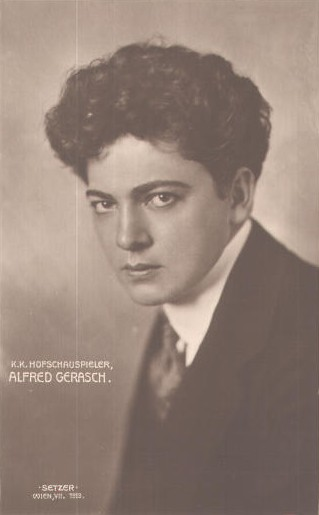
- Gerasch in 1913
- Born: 17 August 1877; Berlin, German Empire
- Died: 12 August 1955 (aged 77); Vienna, Austria
- Occupation: Actor
- Years active: 1919–1947 (film)

Alfred Gerasch (17 August 1877 – 12 August 1955) was a German film actor.

== Selected filmography ==
- The Guilt of Lavinia Morland (1920)
- The Legend of Holy Simplicity (1920)
- The Handicap of Love (1921)
- His Excellency from Madagascar (1922)
- Sins of Yesterday (1922)
- Time Is Money (1923)
- Shadows of the Metropolis (1925)
- The Great Duchess (1926)
- State Attorney Jordan (1926)
- A Modern Dubarry (1927)
- Behind the Altar (1927)
- Queen Louise (1927)
- The Tragedy of a Lost Soul (1927)
- The Lady with the Tiger Skin (1927)
- The Schorrsiegel Affair (1928)
- Yacht of the Seven Sins (1928)
- Odette (1928)
- Spy of Madame Pompadour (1928)
- The Girl from the Provinces (1929)
- Napoleon at Saint Helena (1929)
- Father and Son (1930)
- Reckless Youth (1931)
- 1914 (1931)
- Ariane (1931)
- Tannenberg (1932)
- Marshal Forwards (1932)
- Trenck (1932)
- A Thousand for One Night (1933)
- The Happiness of Grinzing (1933)
- Decoy (1934)
- Spring Parade (1934)
- Hundred Days (1935)
- A Doctor of Conviction (1936)
- Fridericus (1937)
- The Charm of La Boheme (1937)
- Mother Song (1937)

== Bibliography ==
- Chandler, Charlotte. Marlene: Marlene Dietrich, A Personal Biography. Simon and Schuster, 2011.
