= That Dangerous Age (1927 film) =

1927 film

- Directed by: Eugen Illés
- Written by: Bobby E. Lüthge
- Based on: That Dangerous Age by Karin Michaëlis
- Starring: Asta Nielsen; Bernhard Goetzke; Hans Wassmann
- Cinematography: Johannes Männling
- Production company: Illés-Film
- Distributed by: Deutsche Lichtspiel-Syndikat
- Release date: November 17, 1927
- Running time: 103 minutes
- Country: Germany
- Languages: Silent; German intertitles

That Dangerous Age (German: Das gefährliche Alter) is a 1927 German silent drama film directed by Eugen Illés and starring Asta Nielsen, Bernhard Goetzke and Hans Wassmann. It was shot at the Halensee Studios in Berlin and on location in Sweden. The film's sets were designed by the art director. Gustav A. Knauer. The film premiered at the Ufa-Palast am Zoo in Berlin on 17 November 1927.

== Cast ==
- Asta Nielsen as Elsie seine Frau
- Bernhard Goetzke as Richard Lindtner U-Prof.
- Hans Wassmann as Wellmann
- Trude Hesterberg as Lilly seine Frau
- Walter Rilla as Jörgen - Student
- Hans Adalbert Schlettow as Axel - Student
- Maria Paudler as Magna - Studentin
- Lucie Höflich as Köchin Tob
- Ernst Rückert as Chauffeur
- Adolphe Engers as Mr.Pierre
- Ressel Orla as Resi Kellnerin
- Hermann Vallentin as Jensen ein Fischer
- Josefine Dora as Wirtin
- Lilian Weiß as Nelly eine Zofe

== Bibliography ==
- Hans-Michael Bock and Tim Bergfelder. The Concise Cinegraph: An Encyclopedia of German Cinema. Berghahn Books.
