= Fred Doederlein =

German actor (1906–1985)

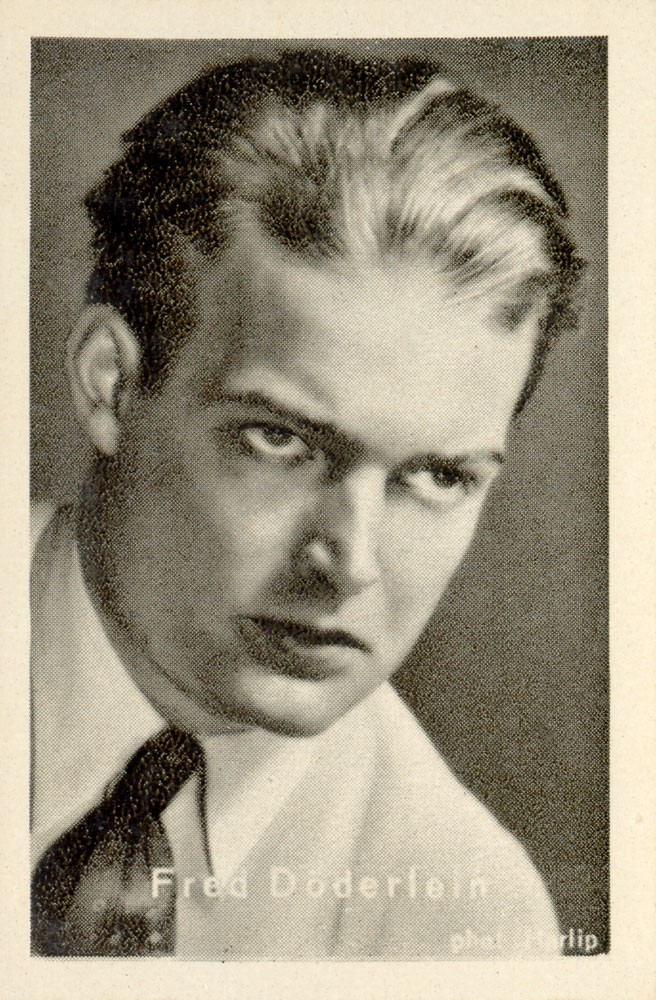
- Fred Doederlein c. 1927
- Born: Lothar Fritz Oskar Döderlein; 24 April 1906; Saint-Avold, Lothringen, German Empire
- Died: 23 April 1985 (aged 78); Canada
- Other name: Alfred Döderlein
- Occupation: Actor
- Years active: 1927–1984 (film)

Fred Doederlein (born Lothar Fritz Oskar Döderlein; 24 April 1906 – 23 April 1985) was a German stage and film actor. He played leading roles in several silent films during the 1920s. He later emigrated to Canada and appeared in David Cronenberg's first feature, Shivers as Dr Emil Hobbes and in Scanners as Yoga Master Tautz.

== Filmography ==
Year	Title	Role	Notes
1927	Queen Louise	Prinz Louis	
1928	The Three Women of Urban Hell	Hell	
1929	Diary of a Coquette	Sein Sohn Helmuth	
1929	The White Paradise	Kurt Bergen - Skilehrer	
1929	The Green Monocle	Hans von Traß	
1929	Nachtlokal		
1929	The Girl from the Provinces	Bert	
1930	Die Jugendgeliebte		
1930	Sei gegrüßt, Du mein schönes Sorrent		
1930	Dance Into Happiness		
1930	Three Days Confined to Barracks	Erich Feldern, Leutnant	
1931	Purpur und Waschblau	Erbprinz Georg, ihr Neffe, genannt Georg Burg	
1931	The Trunks of Mr. O.F.	Alexander, Sohn des Bürgermeisters	
1932	Tannenberg	Leutnant Schmidz	
1934	Peer Gynt	Mats Moen	
1935	Hundred Days	Neipperg	
1935	Kampf um Kraft		
1937	Gordian the Tyrant	Assessor Hans von Planck	
1938	Comrades at Sea	Leutnant Born	
1938	Red Orchids	Ingenieur Laurenz	
1975	Shivers	Emil Hobbes	
1975	The Mystery of the Million Dollar Hockey Puck	Jeweller	
1978	Blackout	Mr. Grant	
1981	Scanners	Dieter Tautz	
1984	The Hotel New Hampshire	Finnish Doctor	(final film role)

== Bibliography ==
- John Kenneth Muir. Horror Films of the 1980s. 2012.
