= Colibri (film) =

1924 film

- Directed by: Victor Janson
- Written by: Paul Frank; Franz Rauch
- Produced by: Ossi Oswalda; Gustav von Koczian-Miskolczy
- Starring: Ossi Oswalda; Bruno Kastner
- Cinematography: Willy Gaebel; Marius Holdt
- Production company: Ossi Oswalda-Film
- Distributed by: Westi Film
- Release date: March 1924
- Country: Germany
- Languages: Silent; German intertitles

Colibri is a 1924 German silent film directed by Victor Janson and starring Ossi Oswalda and Bruno Kastner.

The film's sets were designed by the art director Jacek Rotmil.

== Cast ==
- Ossi Oswalda as Colibri
- Victor Janson as Boddy
- Bruno Kastner as Reginald
- Franz Egenieff as Percy F. Barrymore
- Mara Markhoff as Magda
- Paul Bildt as Stadnicky, Clown
- Hans Junkermann as Tomaselli, Zirkusdirektor
- Lydia Potechina as Arabella, seine Frau
- Reinhold Hintze as Samson, Athlet
- Hans Lipschütz as Marcus
- M.O. Schiller as Löw
- Hugo Döblin as Samuel, Althändler
- Wilhelm Chandron as Wilcox, Laboratoriumsgehilfe
- Erich Walter as Karmanoff, ein Russe
- Tschunka Tschen as Dr. Yokito, ein Japaner

== Plot ==
=== Synopsis ===
Colibri is a 1924 German silent comedy film that follows the story of a street girl known only as "Colibri," who is exploited by her protector, the burly occasional thief Boddy, for his petty crimes, including thefts where she acts as a decoy. This leads to frequent run-ins with the police. The rich benefactor Mr. Barrymore encounters Colibri and, inspired by a Pygmalion-like transformation, decides to take her under his wing, educating her to become a proper lady and integrating her into high society. Colibri's life changes dramatically, but Boddy refuses to relinquish his useful accomplice. When another theft—of important documents—is pinned on Colibri, she flees the Barrymore estate in shame, joins a traveling circus, and rises to stardom as a variety performer. Further pursuits by authorities force her to flee again, leading to a series of turbulent events. Despite her ability to discern right from wrong, Colibri attempts to return the stolen goods to Boddy's victims. Once her innocence in the document theft is proven, she returns to the Barrymores, where she reunites with Reginald Barrymore, the handsome nephew of her benefactor, with whom she has fallen in love.

== Bibliography ==
- Bock, Hans-Michael & Bergfelder, Tim. The Concise CineGraph. Encyclopedia of German Cinema. Berghahn Books, 2009.
