= Jenő Illés =

Hungarian cinematographer and film director

Jenő Illés (28 January 1879 in Debrecen - 17 October 1951 in Budapest) was a Hungarian cinematographer and film director. He worked for most of his career in the German film industry and is often credited as Eugen Illés.

== Partial filmography ==
Director

- The Lady with the Mask (1913)
- Monna Vanna (1916)
- Alraune, die Henkerstochter, genannt die rote Hanne (1918)
- Mania (1918)
- Struggling Souls (1918)
- Seelen im Sturm (1920)
- The Railway King (1921)
- Jeremias (1922)
- The Strumpet's Plaything (1922)
- The Fall of Jerusalem (1922)
- The Doomed (1924)
- That Dangerous Age (1927)

== Bibliography ==
- Cunningham, John. Hungarian Cinema: From Coffee House to Multiplex. Wallflower Press, 2004.
