= Adam and Eve (1928 film) =

1928 film

- Valerie Boothby and Reinhold Schünzel
- German: Adam und Eva
- Directed by: Rudolf Biebrach
- Written by: Alfred Schirokauer; Reinhold Schünzel
- Produced by: Reinhold Schünzel
- Starring: Reinhold Schünzel; Elza Temary; Valerie Boothby
- Cinematography: Willy Goldberger
- Production company: Reinhold Schünzel Film
- Distributed by: Universum Film AG
- Release date: 16 October 1928
- Running time: 83 minutes
- Country: Germany
- Languages: Silent; German intertitles

Adam and Eve (German: Adam und Eva) is a 1928 German silent comedy film directed by Rudolf Biebrach and starring Reinhold Schünzel, Elza Temary and Valerie Boothby. It was shot at the Babelsberg Studios in Berlin and on location in the Giant Mountains. The film's sets were designed by the art directors Arthur Schwarz and Julius von Borsody.

== Synopsis ==
Adam and his girlfriend Anna work as a gardener and maid in a house and are devoted to each other. However, the arrival of a new maid, the vampish Klara, comes between them as she makes a strong play for Adam's affections.

== Cast ==
- Reinhold Schünzel as Adam Grünau
- Elza Temary as Anna, das Hausmädchen
- Valerie Boothby as Klara, die Zofe
- Hermine Sterler as Frau Konsul Jensen
- Trude Lehmann as Cook
- Hugo Werner-Kahle as Diener
- Ernst Hofmann as Sohn
- John Loder
- John Mylong as Chauffeur
- Meta Jäger as Adams Mutter
- Frigga Braut as Forester
