= Arthur Schröder =

German actor

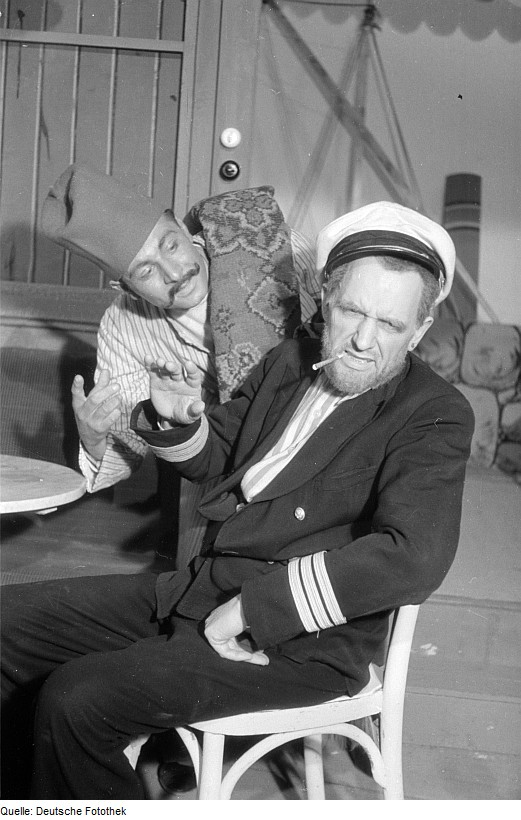
- Born: 20 February 1892; Hamburg, German Empire
- Died: 4 February 1986 (aged 93); West Berlin, West Germany
- Occupation: Film actor
- Years active: 1916–1965

Arthur Schröder (20 February 1892 – 4 February 1986) was a German actor.

== Selected filmography ==
- The Queen's Love Letter (1916)
- Cain (1918)
- Mania (1918)
- Just Once a Great Lady (1934)
- Hubertus Castle (1934)
- His Late Excellency (1935)
- A Doctor of Conviction (1936)
- Der Etappenhase (1937)
- The Ways of Love Are Strange (1937)
- The Beaver Coat (1937)
- The Stars Shine (1938)
- Two Women (1938)
- The Day After the Divorce (1938)
- Marriage in Small Doses (1939)
- Robert and Bertram (1939)
- The Girl at the Reception (1940)
- Quax the Crash Pilot (1941)
- Happiness is the Main Thing (1941)
- Diesel (1942)
- I Entrust My Wife to You (1943)
- Johann (1943)
- The Master of the Estate (1943)
- The Green Salon (1944)
- Life Calls (1944)
- The Noltenius Brothers (1945)
- The Axe of Wandsbek (1951)
- Three Days of Fear (1952)
- Canaris Master Spy (1954)
- The Angel with the Flaming Sword (1954)
- The Night of the Storm (1957)
- Made in Germany (1957)
- Escape from Sahara (1958)
- Freddy, the Guitar and the Sea (1959)
