= Honeymoon (1928 German film) =

1928 film

- Directed by: E. W. Emo
- Written by: Max Ehrlich; Erich Weissenberg; Curt Wesse
- Starring: Margot Landa; Harald Paulsen; Geza L. Weiss
- Cinematography: Hans Karl Gottschalk
- Music by: Walter Ulfig
- Production company: Strauss Film
- Distributed by: Strauss Film
- Release date: 5 June 1928
- Running time: 90 minutes
- Country: Germany
- Languages: Silent; German intertitles

Honeymoon (German: Flitterwochen) is a 1928 German silent film directed by E. W. Emo, and starring Margot Landa, Harald Paulsen, and Geza L. Weiss.

The film's art direction was designed by Kurt Richter.

== Cast ==
- Margot Landa
- Harald Paulsen
- Geza L. Weiss
- Trude Hesterberg
- Max Ehrlich as Lawyer Magnus Hirschfeld
- Teddy Bill

== Bibliography ==
- Gerhard Lamprecht. Deutsche Stummfilme: 1927–1931.
