= Walter Rilla =

German actor (1894–1980)

- Born: Walter Wilhelm Karl Ernst Rilla; 22 August 1894; Neunkirchen, German Empire
- Died: 21 November 1980 (aged 86); Rosenheim, West Germany
- Other name: Walther Rilla
- Occupation: Actor
- Years active: 1922–1977 (film)

Walter Rilla (22 August 1894 – 21 November 1980) was a German film actor. He appeared in more than 130 films between 1922 and 1977. He was born in Neunkirchen, Germany and died in Rosenheim, Germany.

== Career ==
Rilla began his acting career on the German stage, then debuted in film during the silent era. This included an early role for him in Friedrich Wilhelm Murnau's The Grand Duke's Finances in 1924. Following the rise of the Nazi Party to power in 1933, Rilla, a member of the communist party, immigrated in 1936 to Britain and became a regular performer in British films often in villainous or aristocratic roles. Both during and after the Second World War he played Nazi officers or agents.

From the 1950s onwards he returned to West Germany to appear in films and on television, alternating this with continued roles in British cinema. He was the father of film director Wolf Rilla, who directed him in the 1963 film Cairo.

== Filmography ==
- Hannele's Journey to Heaven (1922) as Todesengel
- The Fall of Jerusalem (1922) as Amosa, Captain of the Guard
- All for Money (1923) as Henry von Lauffen
- The Beautiful Girl (1923) as Franz, Sohn der Götts
- The Grand Duke's Finances (1924) as Luis Hernandez
- In the Name of the King (1924)
- Leap Into Life (1924) as Frank - Ideas Partner
- The Monk from Santarem (1924)
- The Blackguard (1925) as Michael Caviol
- The Doll of Luna Park (1925)
- Fire of Love (1925) as Harald von Bodenstein
- The Ones Down There (1926) as Andre
- Cab No. 13 (1926) as Lucien Rebout
- The Fiddler of Florence (1926) as Maler
- Should We Be Silent? (1926) as Dr. Georg Mauthner
- Maytime (1926) as Fred W. Kietz
- Her Highness Dances the Waltz (1926)
- The Divorcée (1926) as Karel van Lysseweghe, Staatssekretär
- The World Wants To Be Deceived (1926) as Dr. Stone, Arzt
- The Queen of the Baths (1926) as Lord Arthur Blythe
- Wie bleibe ich jung und schön - Ehegeheimnisse (1926)
- The Sporck Battalion (1927) as Leutnant von Naugard
- Children's Souls Accuse You (1927)
- Poor Little Colombine (1927) as Ernst Honsel
- The White Spider (1927) as Lord Barrymore
- That Dangerous Age (1927) as Jörgen - Student
- Orient Express (1927) as Allan Wilton
- Doña Juana (1928) as Don Ramon
- Sajenko the Soviet (1928) as Mirow, Sekretär des Handelsbüros
- The Schorrsiegel Affair (1928) as Bernhard Benda
- Eva in Silk (1928) as Dr. Erich Stiereß, Schriftsteller
- Princess Olala (1928) as Prince Boris, the Prince's Son
- The Last Night (1928) as Ernest
- Honour Thy Mother (1928) as Fritz - ihr Sohn
- The Abduction of the Sabine Women (1928) as Emil Groß, genannt Sterneck, sein Sohn
- The Man with the Frog (1929) as Henri Vallencours
- Inherited Passions (1929) as Henry Bourtyne
- The Monte Cristo of Prague (1929) as Fred Born
- Gentlemen Among Themselves (1929) as Heinz Rüdiger, Student der Medizin
- Incest (1929) as Martin Hollman
- Sin of a Beautiful Woman (1929) as Richard Kent
- Marriage in Trouble (1929) as Mann
- Karriere (1930)
- It Happens Every Day (1930)
- Rendezvous (1930) as Armand
- The Great Longing (1930) as Himself
- Marriage in Name Only (1930) as Baron Hans v. Velten
- Different Morals (1931) as Norman
- Circus Life (1931) as Morini. Kunstschütze
- Checkmate (1931) as Georg Holl, Journalist
- Reckless Youth (1931) as Dan O'Bannon, Prosecutor
- 24 Hours in the Life of a Woman (1931) as Sascha Lonay
- The Men Around Lucy (1931) as Robert
- Hände aus dem Dunkel (1933) as Direktor Leermann
- A Certain Mr. Gran (1933) as Pietro Broccardo, Maler
- Un certain monsieur Grant (1933) as Mario Landi
- Adventures on the Lido (1933) as Leonard
- The Hunter from Kurpfalz (1933) as Baron Hans, sein Bruder, Buchhändler
- The Champion of Pontresina (1934) as Peter Tonani, Geigenvirtuose
- The Scarlet Pimpernel (1934) as Armand St. Just
- Abdul the Damned (1935) as Hassan-Bey
- Lady Windermere's Fan (1935) as Lord Windermere
- Love's Awakening (1936) as Robert Lund - Violinvirtuose
- The Accusing Song (1936) as Detlef Ollmer - Bildhauer
- Victoria the Great (1937) as Prince Ernest
- Mollenard (1938) as Frazer
- Sixty Glorious Years (1938) as Prince Ernst
- The Gang's All Here (1939) as Prince Homouska
- Black Eyes (1939) as Roudine
- Hell's Cargo (1939) as Cmndt. Lestailleur
- At the Villa Rose (1940) as Mr. Ricardo
- The Adventures of Tartu (1943) as Inspector Otto Vogel
- Candlelight in Algeria (1944) as Dr. Muller
- Mr. Emmanuel (1944) as Brockenburg
- Lisbon Story (1946) as Karl von Schriner
- It's Hard to Be Good (1948) as Kamerovsky (uncredited)
- Golden Salamander (1950) as Serafis
- State Secret (1950) as General Niva
- My Daughter Joy (1950) as Andreas
- Shadow of the Eagle (1950) as Prince Radziwill
- I'll Get You for This (1951) as Mueller
- Without a Flag (1951) as Spionagechef
- Venetian Bird (1952) as Count Boria
- Desperate Moment (1953) as Col. Bertrand, Dutch consulate
- Star of India (1954) as Van Horst
- The Green Carnation (1954) as Frank Olsen
- Track the Man Down (1955) as Austin Melford
- The Gamma People (1956) as Boronski
- Confessions of Felix Krull (1957) as Lord Kilmarnock
- Scampolo (1958) as Lombardo
- … und nichts als die Wahrheit (1958) as Michael Fabian
- For the First Time (1959) as Dr. Bessart
- Love Now, Pay Later (1959) as Alexander Woltikoff, Geschäftsmann
- Beloved Augustin (1960) as Baron von Gravenreuth
- Song Without End (1960) as Archbishop
- The Secret Ways (1961) as Jancsi
- Our House in Cameroon (1961) as John Leith
- Riviera Story (1961) as Nikanos
- The Forger of London (1961) as Konsul Steensand
- The Wonderful World of the Brothers Grimm (1962) as Priest
- Das Testament des Dr. Mabuse (1962) as Prof. Pohland
- Cairo (1963) as Kuchuk
- Scotland Yard Hunts Dr. Mabuse (1963) as Dr. Pohland / 'Dr. Mabuse'
- 12 Angry Men (1963, TV film) as Juror 9
- Death Drums Along the River (1963) as Dr. Schneider
- Room 13 (1964) as Sir Marney
- The Secret of Dr. Mabuse (1964) as Prof. Pohland
- The River Line (1964) as Pierre, Maries Vater
- Victim Five (1964) as Wexler
- The Seventh Victim (1964) as Lord John Mant
- Frozen Alive (1964) as Sir Keith
- The Face of Fu Manchu (1965) as Muller
- 4 Schlüssel (1966) as Bankdirektor Rose
- Die Rechnung – eiskalt serviert (1966) as John M. Clark
- Once a Greek (1966) as Staatspräsident
- Martin Soldat (1966) as Général von Haffelrats
- Day of Anger (1967) as Murph Allan Scott
- The Girl from Rio (1969) as Ennio Rossini (uncredited)
- Detectives (1969) as Krüger
- Pepe, der Paukerschreck (1969) as Ministerialdirektor
- The Devil Came from Akasava (1971) as Lord Kingsley
- Malpertuis (1971) as Eisengott
- Disorder and Early Torment (1977)

== Bibliography ==
- Dove, Richard. Journey of No Return: Five German-speaking Literary Exiles in Britain, 1933-1945. Libris, 2000.
