= Reckless Youth (1931 film) =

1931 film

- Directed by: Leo Mittler
- Written by: Alice Duer Miller (novel); Henry Koster; Benno Vigny
- Starring: Camilla Horn; Walter Rilla; Alfred Gerasch
- Cinematography: Fred Langenfeld
- Production company: Paramount Pictures
- Distributed by: Paramount Pictures
- Release date: 23 November 1931
- Running time: 89 minutes
- Country: Germany
- Language: German

Reckless Youth (German: Leichtsinnige Jugend) is a 1931 German film directed by Leo Mittler and starring Camilla Horn, Walter Rilla and Alfred Gerasch. It was made by Paramount Pictures at the Joinville Studios in Paris as a remake of the company's American film Manslaughter.

== Cast ==
- Camilla Horn as Lydia Thorne
- Walter Rilla as Dan O'Bannon, Prosecutor
- Alfred Gerasch as Dr. Albee, Lawyer
- Grit Haid as Ellinor
- Hertha von Hagen as Miß Bennett
- Marguerite Roma as Bessie
- Harald Smith
- Jaro Fürth as Pierce
- Elisabeth Bechtel as 1. Aufseherin
- Vera Baranovskaya as
- Eugen Jensen as Morson
- Josef Bunzl as Peters
- Maroth Marothy as Forster
- Emil Ritter as Kommissar

== Bibliography ==
- Beckman, Karen (2010). Crash: Cinema and the Politics of Speed and Stasis. Duke University Press. ISBN 978-0-8223-9276-7.
