= Traute Carlsen =

German actress (1882–1968)

- Born: 16 February 1882; Dresden, German Empire
- Died: 22 November 1968 (aged 86); Zürich, Switzerland
- Other name: Gertrud Rosalie Kempner
- Occupation: Actress
- Years active: 1914–1966 (film)

Traute Carlsen (16 February 1882 – 22 November 1968) was a German stage and film actress. Following the Nazi rise to power in 1933, the Jewish Carlsen left Germany for Switzerland where she settled permanently.

She was married to the Austrian actor Karl Forest.

== Biography ==
Carlsen attended the acting school of the Deutsches Theater in Berlin and made her debut in 1907 at the Hof-und Nationaltheater in Mannheim. In 1910, she came to the Komödienhaus in Frankfurt, and in 1912 to the Kleines Theater in Berlin.

In productions of the Duskes-Film and the Imperator-Film, she appeared in front of the camera as a leading actress in melodramas from 1913. After the end of the war, however, she turned increasingly to the theater again and arrived at the Burgtheater in Vienna via Frankfurt. In 1927, Carlsen, who had been married to Viktor Gerber since 1924, moved to the Schauspielhaus Zürich.

Occasionally she made guest appearances in Berlin and again took on smaller film roles. She last appeared at the Komische Oper between 1932 and 1933. She also appeared in Vienna in 1933/34 at the Theater in der Josefstadt. After the Nazis came to power in 1933, Carlsen, who was of Jewish descent, remained in Switzerland for good and appeared mainly at the Schauspielhaus in Zürich. There, she appeared in 1954 as the Priestess in Penthesilea and in 1955 as Betty in Mein Freund Harvey. Her subject was that of the elegant lady of the world.

In Swiss film, she took on some minor roles, and also worked for Radio Bern and Swiss television. She was temporarily married to director Karlheinz Martin (1886–1948) and actor Karl Forest (born Obertimpfler, 1874–1944). In 1956, she spelled herself Traute Carlsen-Obertimpfler. In 1959, she was awarded the Hans-Reinhart-Ring.

== Selected filmography ==
- Love Affairs (1927)
- The First Right of the Child (1932)
- Marshal Forwards (1932)
- Heidi (1952)
- Heidi and Peter (1955)
- The Zürich Engagement (1957)
