= Maria Forescu =

German actress and singer

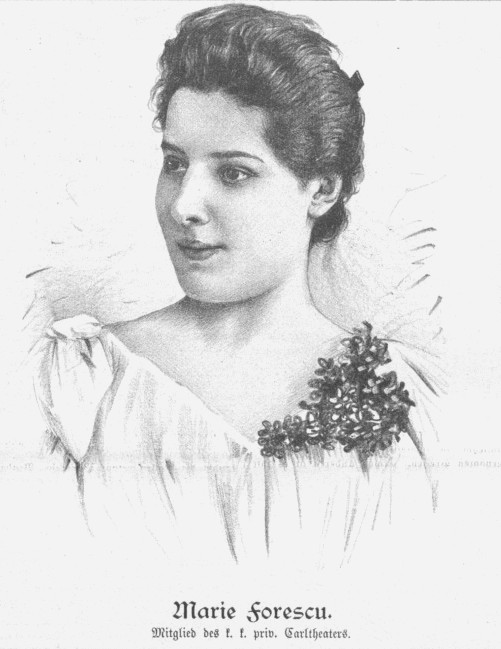
- Born: Maria Füllenbaum; 15 January 1875; Czernowitz, Austria-Hungary
- Died: 28 October 1947 (aged 72); Berlin, Germany
- Occupation: Film actress
- Years active: 1913–1933

Maria Forescu (15 January 1875 – 28 October 1947) was an Austro-Hungarian-born Romanian opera singer and film actress. During the silent and talkies era of the German cinema, she appeared in several movies as a supporting actress. When Adolf Hitler came to power, Forescu, like other Jews of that period, was barred from her profession. Living undercover during the later years of World War II, she survived the Holocaust and died in 1947 in East Berlin.

== Biography ==
Forescu was born Maria Füllenbaum on 15 January 1875, in Czernowitz, Austria-Hungary. She attended a boarding school in Paris. She studied singing, music and drama at the Prague Conservatory. Around the turn of the century, she debuted as an operetta singer and soon became a well known member of the renowned Viennese Carl Theater. She also performed in several of the tours organized by the theater throughout Europe. Then she went to Berlin, where she appeared at the theater of the West, at the Operetta Theater, and the Metropolitan Theater.

She made her film acting debut in 1911 with the Charles Paulus-directed Die Pflicht. She left singing in 1915 to concentrate on her film acting career. She mainly appeared as a supporting actress. After the advent of the talkies she acted in several films of her friend Harry Piel. She had played the character of Yelina in the crime film Marizza. The most popular films in which Maria Forescu acted were the Gerhard Lamprecht-directed Between Night and Dawn and the Hans Behrendt-directed Danton (both 1931). In the 1929 film Der Sittenrichter. § 218. Eine wahre Begebenheit, Forescu played the woman who aborted the heroine's child. The film was considered controversial for depicting the topic of abortion. She also starred in the 1920 silent film The Women House of Brescia. The film was rejected by the British Board of Film Classification.

In 1932, after filming Das erste Recht des Kindes (directed by Fritz Wendhausen), her career was cut short by the new laws made by the Nazi party. She was deprived of living a respected life and was prohibited from engaging in any professional activities. Forescu, who was of Jewish origin, was expelled from the Reichsfachschaft Film in 1938. After the expulsion and the rising hatred against the Jews she took refuge with Maria Hirschburg on the Motzstrasse in Berlin-Wilmersdorf. She died in 1947 in Berlin-Müggelheim. Throughout her career she had acted in approximately 160 films.

== Selected filmography ==
- The Story of Dida Ibsen (1918)
- Colomba (1918)
- Peer Gynt (1919)
- The Dancer (1919)
- Veritas Vincit (1919)
- Humanity Unleashed (1920)
- The Stranger from Alster Street (1921)
- Marizza (1922)
- The Call of Destiny (1922)
- Tabitha, Stand Up (1922)
- Lola Montez, the King's Dancer (1922)
- The Circle of Death (1922)
- Tania, the Woman in Chains (1922)
- The Great Industrialist (1923)
- Esterella (1923)
- Resurrection (1923)
- Jimmy: The Tale of a Girl and Her Bear (1923)
- A Dangerous Game (1924)
- Marionettes of the Princess (1924)
- The Fake Emir (1924)
- The King and the Girl (1925)
- Goetz von Berlichingen of the Iron Hand (1925)
- Joyless Street (1925)
- The Hanseatics (1925)
- The Adventures of Sybil Brent (1925)
- Slums of Berlin (1925)
- The Good Reputation (1926)
- Fedora (1926)
- People to Each Other (1926)
- Should We Be Silent? (1926)
- Lace (1926)
- Love's Joys and Woes (1926)
- Watch on the Rhine (1926)
- White Slave Traffic (1926)
- The Gypsy Baron (1927)
- Break-in (1927)
- Bigamie (1927)
- Valencia (1927)
- The Vice of Humanity (1927)
- The Bordellos of Algiers (1927)
- Poor Little Colombine (1927)
- Two Brothers (1927)
- A Crazy Night (1927)
- The False Prince (1927)
- Anastasia, the False Czar's Daughter (1928)
- Give Me Life (1928)
- Emerald of the East (1929)
- The Girl from the Provinces (1929)
- The Man with the Frog (1929)
- The Veil Dancer (1929)
- The Daredevil Reporter (1929)
- The Customs Judge (1929)
- Men Without Work (1929)
- His Best Friend (1929)
- Inherited Passions (1929)
- Two Brothers (1929)
- The Caviar Princess (1930)
- Him or Me (1930)
- Echo of a Dream (1930)
- Susanne Cleans Up (1930)
- A Crafty Youth (1931)
- Shadows of the Underworld (1931)
- Road to Rio (1931)
- Danton (1931)
- Between Night and Dawn (1931)
- The Trunks of Mr. O.F. (1931)
- The Cheeky Devil (1932)
- Ship Without a Harbour (1932)
- The First Right of the Child (1932)

== Bibliography ==
- Hardt, Ursula. From Caligari to California: Erich Pommer's Life in the International Film Wars. Berghahn Books, 1996.
