= Arpad Viragh =

Hungarian cinematographer (1888–1930)

- Born: 12 January 1888; Budapest, Hungary
- Died: 31 May 1930 (aged 42); Capri, Italy
- Occupation: Cinematographer

Arpad Viragh (12 January 1888 – 31 May 1930) was a Hungarian cinematographer. He began his career in his native Hungary going on to work in the film industries of several European nations but primarily in Germany. He died on Capri in 1930 during the shooting of City of Song after contracting typhoid.

== Selected filmography ==
- Miska the Magnate (1916)
- The One Million Pound Note (1916)
- Tales of the Typewriter (1916)
- Anita Jo (1919)
- Napoleon and the Little Washerwoman (1920)
- The Tragedy of a Great (1920)
- Princess Woronzoff (1920)
- Respectable Women (1920)
- The Red Poster (1920)
- Danton (1921)
- The Vulture Wally (1921)
- Symphony of Death (1921)
- The House of Torment (1921)
- The White Death (1921)
- The Experiment of Professor Mithrany (1921)
- Lola Montez, the King's Dancer (1922)
- Friend Ripp (1923)
- Two People (1924)
- Nanon (1924)
- Orient (1924)
- Nick, King of the Chauffeurs (1925)
- Women of Passion (1926)
- The Fiddler of Florence (1926)
- We Belong to the Imperial-Royal Infantry Regiment (1926)
- The Flight in the Night (1926)
- When I Came Back (1926)
- Watch on the Rhine (1926)
- Love's Joys and Woes (1926)
- The White Horse Inn (1926)
- Homesick (1927)
- The Mistress (1927)
- Svengali (1927)
- Bigamie (1927)
- The Sporck Battalion (1927)
- Queen Louise (1927)
- Miss Chauffeur (1928)
- He Goes Right, She Goes Left! (1928)
- The Runaway Princess (1929)
- The Unwritten Law (1929)
- The Singing City (1930)
- City of Song (1931)

== Bibliography ==
- Simon, Andrew L. Made in Hungary: Hungarian Contributions to Universal Culture. Simon Publications, 1998.
