= The Rakoczi March =

1933 film

- Directed by: Gustav Fröhlich; Steve Sekely
- Written by: Ferenc Herczeg (play); Ernst Marischka; Franz Vayda; Andor Zsoldos
- Starring: Gustav Fröhlich; Leopold Kramer; Camilla Horn
- Cinematography: István Eiben; Willy Goldberger
- Edited by: József Szilas
- Music by: Paul Abraham
- Production companies: Hunnia Filmgyár; Mondial-Film; Märkische Film
- Distributed by: Mondial-Film
- Release dates: 23 November 1933 (Hungary): 15 December 1933; (Germany)
- Running time: 101 minutes
- Countries: Austria; Germany; Hungary
- Languages: German; Hungarian

The Rakoczi March (German: Rakoczy-Marsch) is a 1933 drama film directed by Gustav Fröhlich and Steve Sekely and starring Fröhlich, Leopold Kramer and Camilla Horn. It was a co-production between Austria, Germany and Hungary. It was shot at the Hunnia Studios in Budapest. The film's sets were designed by the art director Márton Vincze. A separate Hungarian-language version, Rákóczi induló, was made.

== Cast ==
=== German-language version ===
- Gustav Fröhlich as Oberleutnant Tarjan
- Leopold Kramer as Graf Job
- Camilla Horn as Vilma, his daughter
- Paul Wagner as Rittmeister Arpad Graf Job, his son
- Ellen Frank as Erika, his niece
- Tibor Halmay as Leutnant Lorant
- Margit Angerer as the recital singer
- László Dezsőffy as the watchman
- Anton Pointner as Merlin, Job's neighbour
- Charles Puffy as the vet
- Willi Schur as Mischka, Tarjan's batman
- Rudolf Teubler as the peasant
- Otto Treßler as the regimental doctor
- Peter Wolff as Fähnrich Bilitzky

=== Hungarian-language version ===
- Pál Jávor as Tarján Sándor first Military-major
- Margit Dajka as Vilma, Jób's daughter
- Ferenc Kiss as Árpád, Jób's son
- Gyula Csortos as count Jób Ferenc
- Tibor Halmay as Lóránt Military-major
- Ida Turay as Tamássy Éva, Vilma' cousin
- Gyula Gózon as Mihály, Tarján's Batman
- Imre Apáthi as Bilinczky Géza Flagbearer
- Ernõ Szenes as Dr.Kovács, chief veterinarian
- Oscar Beregi Sr. as Baron Merlin Ádám, landed gentleman
- László Dezsõffy as Guard-master
- Géza Márky as dancing boy in vintage
- Emil Fenyö as doctor
- István Dózsa as Jób's lackey
- Gusztáv Vándory as doctor in the village
- Erzsi Pártos as gorl in the village
- Karola Zala as Jób's aunt
- Ilona Náday as peasant girl
- Lajos Gárday as Lóránt's Batman
- Ferenc Pázmán as General
- Kálmán Zátony as Common soldier

== Bibliography ==
- Von Dassanowsky, Robert (2005). Austrian Cinema: A History. McFarland. ISBN 978-1-4766-2147-0.
