= Him or Me =

1930 film directed by Harry Piel

- Directed by: Harry Piel
- Written by: Hans Rameau
- Produced by: Harry Piel
- Starring: Harry Piel; Valerie Boothby; Hans Junkermann
- Cinematography: Ewald Daub
- Edited by: Andrew Marton
- Music by: Fritz Byjacco
- Production company: Ariel-Film
- Distributed by: Deutsche Lichtspiel-Syndikat
- Release date: 27 November 1930
- Running time: 77 minutes
- Country: Germany
- Language: German

Him or Me (German: Er oder ich) is a 1930 German comedy-action film directed by Harry Piel and starring Piel, Valerie Boothby, and Hans Junkermann. It marked Piel's debut in sound films, and he was a popular star of adventure films during the silent era.

The film's sets were designed by art directors Robert Neppach and Erwin Scharf. Location shooting took place in Northern Italy, the Netherlands, and the French Riviera.

== Cast ==
- Harry Piel as Carlo Moreno / Hochstapler / Egon / Prinz von Valona
- Valerie Boothby as Yvette Baradow, Dame auf Reisen
- Hans Junkermann as Baron von Hohenberg
- Eduard von Winterstein as R. A. Wilken, Schiffsreeder
- Olivia Fried as Eveline, seine Tochter
- Hermann Vallentin as Kriminalkommissar
- Maria Forescu as Stewardesse
- Charly Berger
- Hugo Döblin as Zeitungsreporter
- Ernst Morgan as Pressephotograph
- Paul Rehkopf
- Hans Wallner
- Willy Kaiser-Heyl

== Bibliography ==
- Parish, James Robert (1977). Film Actors Guide: Western Europe. Metuchen, NJ: Scarecrow Press. ISBN 978-0-8108-1044-0.
