= The Assmanns =

1925 film

- Directed by: Arthur Bergen
- Starring: Grete Reinwald; Bruno Kastner; Auguste Prasch-Grevenberg
- Cinematography: Leopold Kutzleb
- Production company: National Film
- Distributed by: National Film
- Release date: 1925
- Country: Germany
- Languages: Silent; German intertitles

The Assmanns (German: Die Aßmanns) is a 1925 German silent film directed by Arthur Bergen and starring Grete Reinwald, Bruno Kastner, and Auguste Prasch-Grevenberg.

The film's sets were designed by the art director Max Knaake.

== Cast ==
- Grete Reinwald as Bettina
- Bruno Kastner as Ernst Aßmann
- Auguste Prasch-Grevenberg as Großtante Emma
- Elena Lunda as Asta Wendheim
- Grete Berger as Frau Fabrikbesitzer Aßmann
- Karl Elzer as Fabrikbesitzer Aßmann
- Hans Stüwe as Assessor von Bühren
