= Fedora (1926 film) =

1926 film

- Directed by: Jean Manoussi
- Written by: Jean Manoussi; Victorien Sardou (play)
- Produced by: Paul Ebner; Maxim Galitzenstein
- Starring: Lee Parry; Anita Dorris; Alfons Fryland
- Cinematography: Willy Gaebel; Theodor Sparkuhl; [[Otto Tober]]
- Production company: Maxim-Film
- Distributed by: Filmhaus Bruckmann
- Release date: 6 May 1926
- Country: Germany
- Languages: Silent; German intertitles

Fedora is a 1926 German silent film based upon the play by Victorien Sardou, directed by Jean Manoussi and starring Lee Parry, Anita Dorris, and Alfons Fryland.

The film's sets were designed by the art director Artur Günther.

== Plot ==
The story of Russian Princess Fedora (Lee Parry), in Czarist times, whose royal lover is assassinated on the eve of their marriage. She pledges vengeance, only to become the victim of her vow when she falls in love again.

== Cast ==
- Lee Parry
- Anita Dorris
- Alfons Fryland
- Oskar Marion
- Maria Forescu
- Erich Kaiser-Titz
- Nikolai Malikoff
- Frida Richard
- Eduard von Winterstein

== Bibliography ==
- Bock, Hans-Michael; Bergfelder, Tim, eds. (2009). The Concise Cinegraph: Encyclopaedia of German Cinema. New York: Berghahn Books. ISBN 978-1-57181-655-9.
