= Margit Angerer =

Hungarian opera soprano (1895–1978)

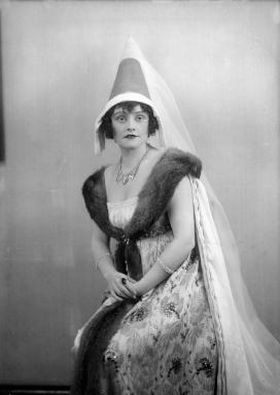
Margit Angerer, ca. 1926

Margit Angerer (born Margit Rupp; 6 November 1895 – 31 January 1978) was a Hungarian operatic soprano.

== Biography ==
Margit Rupp was born in Budapest. She studied at the Fodor Conservatorium (now the Aladár Tóth Conservatorium) and at the Budapest Music Academy where she was taught by Arturo de Sanctis. She made her debut in Budapest. After her marriage to industrialist Gottfried Schenker-Angerer in 1919 she joined her husband in Vienna. Angerer quickly made herself a reputation in the Lieder genre through salon performances in Vienna. In December 1925 she had her first stage success with Verdi's Requiem in the Vienna Konzerthaus, a performance also broadcast on the radio.

She made her operatic debut in 1926 as Leonora in Verdi's La forza del destino at the Vienna State Opera. Marcel Prawy wrote of this:

Margit Schenker-Angerer, a prominent figure of Viennese society, was also extremely good-looking, with the smile and the figure of a Botticelli nymph...Her friends and acquaintances were just waiting for the merchant's wife to come a cropper and disgrace the entire opera as well as herself. Was it not a clear case of a stage-struck amateur aspiring to make a career as a singer with her husband's money and position behind her? But as the premiere took its course it became increasingly obvious that 'Manzi' was a professional to her finger-tips, and as Leonora she went from strength to strength, while the face of the friends and acquaintances grew redder and redder.

In 1927 she signed a contract with the Vienna State Opera, where she appeared more than 160 times in solo roles until 1935. Abroad, she used the stage names Margit von Rupp and Margit Schenker-Angerer. Angerer also worked outside of Vienna, at the Royal Opera House, Covent Garden, and notably at the Salzburg Festival where she appeared in 1930, 1933 and 1935 as Octavian in Der Rosenkavalier. She regularly played Octavian in Vienna, too: it appears to have been the role for which she was best known. In May 1929 Hugo von Hofmannsthal wrote to Richard Strauss: "Angerer's Octavian is charming and ever better; absolutely the best in the history of the opera.".

Other frequent stage portrayals included Elsa in Lohengrin and Dorota in Weinberger's Schwanda the Bagpiper.

In 1928 she gave the world premiere of "Three Songs for Singer and Piano", Op. 22, by Korngold, accompanied by the composer himself as pianist.

In Salzburg, she made her first appearance during the 1930 Festspiele in the title role of Gluck's Iphigénie en Aulide. Three years later, she appeared there as Aithra Die ägyptische Helena by R. Strauss.

Her role as "the concert singer" in Gustav Fröhlich's The Rakoczi March (1933) is her only known appearance in film.

In November 1946, she applied for and was given membership in the Association of Political Prisoners. In her application she stated that in October 1944, while still living in Vienna, she and her daughter had been imprisoned by the Gestapo. By 1946 she was living in London. In 1949 she married Stephan Karpeles-Schenker at Westminster in England.

Her various recordings were issued as individual 78 rpm discs (one aria/duet per each of the two sides, as was standard practice at the time) and later collected on (first) a 33 rpm black disc album and (later) as a CD. She made recordings with Alfred Piccaver between 1928 and 1930.
