= Inherited Passions =

1929 film

- Directed by: Gustav Ucicky
- Written by: Hans H. Zerlett
- Produced by: Victor Skutezky
- Starring: Walter Rilla; Fritz Alberti; Valerie Boothby
- Cinematography: Frederik Fuglsang
- Production company: Hom-Film
- Release date: 3 May 1929
- Running time: 80 minutes
- Country: Germany
- Languages: Silent; German intertitles

Inherited Passions (German: Vererbte Triebe) is a 1929 German silent drama film directed by Gustav Ucicky and starring Walter Rilla, Fritz Alberti, and Valerie Boothby.

== Cast ==
- Walter Rilla as Henry Bourtyne
- Fritz Alberti as Jean Bourtyne
- Valerie Boothby as Edmonde
- Maria Matray as Jeannette
- Hans Albers as Gauner
- Vera Voronina
- Yvette Darnys
- Maria Forescu
- Hertha von Walther
- Teddy Bill
- Fritz Genschow
- Bruno Ziener
- Michael von Newlinsky
- Gerhard Ritterband

== Bibliography ==
- Quinlan, David (1995). Quinlan's Illustrated Directory of Film Character Actors. London: Batsford. ISBN 978-0-7134-7040-6.
