= Franz Egenieff =

German opera singer and actor (1874–1949)

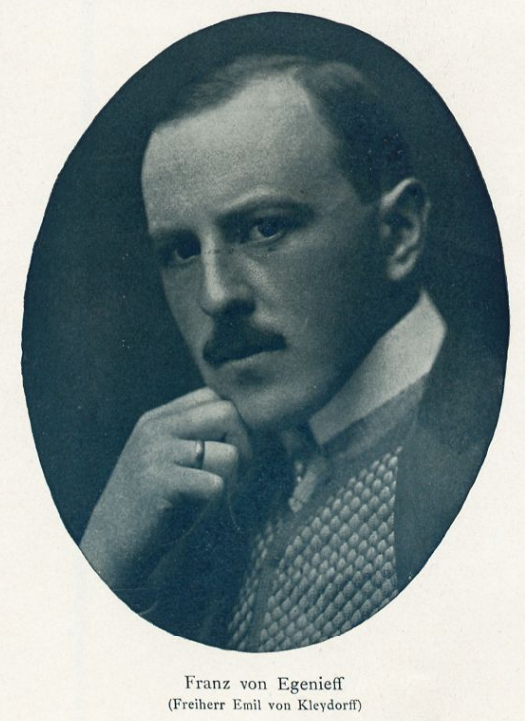
Franz Egenieff

Franz Egenieff (born Marian Eberhard Franz Emil von Kleydorff; 31 May 1874 – 11 June 1949) was a German opera singer and actor.

Egenieff was born in Niederwalluf, Walluf, Hesse, Germany and died at age 75 in Tegernsee, Bavaria, Germany. He was a son of Prince Emil zu Sayn-Wittgenstein-Berleburg (1824–1878) and his second wife Kamila Stefańska (1838–1902), after the marriage she got the aristocratic title von Kleydorff.

Franz Egenieff married 1898 Paula Busch (1877–1962), a niece of Adolphus Busch. The couple had three children. The oldest daughter Anita von Kleydorff (1899–1987) married 1927 the German general Walter Warlimont (1894–1976).

== Selected filmography ==
- A Woman's Revenge (1921)
- The False Dimitri (1922)
- Die Buddenbrooks (1923)
- Colibri (1924)
- Vater werden ist nicht schwer (1926)

== Bibliography ==
- Jung, Uli & Schatzberg, Walter. Beyond Caligari: The Films of Robert Wiene. Berghahn Books, 1999.
