= Walter Warlimont =

German WWII general and war criminal (1894–1976)

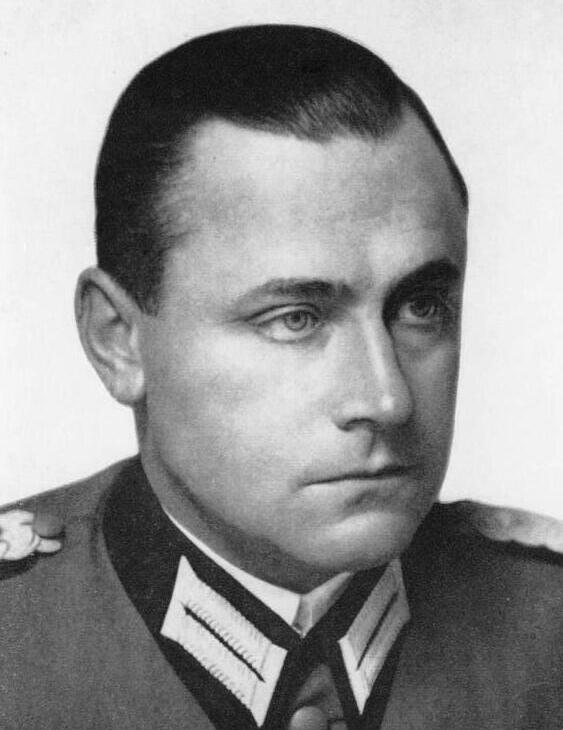
- Warlimont in 1939

Deputy Chief of the Operations Staff of OKW
- In office 1 September 1939 – 6 September 1944
- Superior: Alfred Jodl
- Preceded by: Office established
- Succeeded by: Horst Freiherr Treusch von Buttlar-Brandenfels

Personal details
- Born: 3 October 1894 Osnabrück, Province of Hanover, Kingdom of Prussia, German Empire
- Died: 9 October 1976 (aged 82) Kreuth, Bavaria, West Germany
- Spouse: Anita von Kleydorff (m. 1927)
- Parent(s): Louis Warlimont (father); Anna Rinck (mother)

Military service
- Allegiance: German Empire; Weimar Republic; Nazi Germany
- Branch/service: Imperial German Army; Reichswehr; German Army
- Years of service: 1914–1945
- Rank: General der Artillerie
- Battles/wars: World War I World War II

Walter Warlimont (WAH-li-moh; 3 October 1894 – 9 October 1976) was a German Army staff officer and general during World War II. He served as deputy chief of the Operations Staff, one of the departments in the Oberkommando der Wehrmacht (OKW), the Armed Forces High Command. Following the war, Warlimont was convicted in the High Command Trial and sentenced to life imprisonment as a war criminal. He was released in 1954.

== World War I and inter-war years ==
Warlimont was born in Osnabrück, Germany. In June 1914, just before the start of World War I, he was commissioned as a second lieutenant in the 10th Prussian Foot Artillery Regiment based in Alsace. During the war, he served as an artillery officer and battery commander in France and later in Italy. In late 1918, he served in General Ludwig Maercker's Freikorps Jäger rifle corps.

In the inter-war years, Warlimont served in various military roles. In 1922, he served in the 6th Artillery Regiment and in 1927, as a captain, he was the second adjutant to General Werner von Blomberg, chief of the Truppenamt, the covert German General Staff. In May 1929, Warlimont was attached to the U.S. Army for a year to study American industrial mobilization theory during wartime. This led to his service between 1930 and 1933 as a major on the staff of the Industrial Mobilization Section of the German Defence Ministry. He became the Section's chief in 1935.

Between August and November 1936, following the outbreak of the Spanish Civil War, Warlimont served as the Reich War Minister (OKH General Staff)'s Wehrmacht Plenipotentiary Delegate to the government of Spanish General Francisco Franco in Spain. Reich War Minister Werner von Blomberg directed Warlimont to coordinate German aid in support of Franco's battle against the Spanish government forces.

In 1937, he wrote the Warlimont Memorandum calling for the reorganisation of the German armed forces under one staff unit and one supreme commander. The plan was to limit the power of the high officer caste in favour of Adolf Hitler. On the basis of this memorandum, Hitler developed the Oberkommando der Wehrmacht (High command of the armed forces), with Hitler as supreme commander. Warlimont was rewarded in 1939 with a post as deputy to General Alfred Jodl. In 1938 he was promoted to colonel and became commander of the 26th Artillery Regiment.

== World War II ==
In late 1938, Warlimont became Senior Operations Staff Officer to General Wilhelm Keitel. This was a coveted position, and so between September 1939 and September 1944 he served as Deputy Chief of the Operations Staff (Wehrmachtführungsstab: WFSt: Armed Forces Operations Staff). General Jodl was his superior officer, who served as Chief of the Operations Staff, which was responsible for all strategic, executive and war-operations planning.

While serving on this military operations planning staff, in early 1939 he assisted in developing some of the German military invasion plans of Poland. On 1 September 1939, German military forces invaded Poland, thereby starting World War II.

1940 saw his promotion to Generalmajor, and he assisted in developing the invasion plans of France. During the Battle of France, on June 14, 1940, Warlimont, in an audacious move, asked the pilot of his personal Fieseler Storch to land on the Place de la Concorde in central Paris. In 1941, he continued to assist in developing invasion operations into Russia. This earned his promotion to Generalleutnant in 1942.

His meteoric advancement in rank almost sputtered out on 3 November 1942 when he was relieved of his job after a junior subordinate failed to process a message from Field Marshal Erwin Rommel sufficiently promptly. However, only five days later he was recalled to duty to visit the French Vichy Government in France to coordinate the defense of their colonial territories from possible occupation by the Allies.

In February 1943, Warlimont travelled to Tunis to confer with Rommel as to whether or not the Germans should abandon North Africa.

In early 1944, Warlimont was promoted to General of the Artillery. As Deputy Chief of the Armed Forces Operations Staff, he continued to give almost daily briefings to Hitler regarding the status of German military operations.

On D-Day, when the Allies invaded Normandy, France, Warlimont telephoned Jodl to request that the German tanks in Normandy should be released to attack the Allied invaders. Jodl responded that he did not want to make that decision; they would have to wait until Hitler awoke. Once Hitler awoke and authorised the release of the tanks for a counter-attack, it was too late to blunt the successful Allied invasion. The following day, Hitler sent Warlimont to inspect the German defences in Italy.

On 20 July 1944, Warlimont was wounded during the assassination bombing against Hitler in a war-briefing building in Rastenburg. He suffered a mild head concussion. Later in the day, he telephoned Field Marshal Günther von Kluge and convinced him that Hitler was alive; this prompted Kluge not to continue in the anti-Hitler coup. Warlimont later stated that Hitler had suspected him of participating in the 20 July plot, something he said he learned only from Jodl in June 1945. In spite of this, he belatedly received the special 20th of July Wound Badge, which was awarded only to those few wounded or killed in the 20 July explosion.

On 22 July, Warlimont travelled to France to meet with Field Marshal Rommel (who had been wounded a week earlier by an Allied aeroplane attack) and Rommel's naval aide Vice Admiral Friedrich Ruge, to discuss the deteriorating battlefield situation in Normandy.

On 1 August, Hitler ordered Warlimont to travel to Paris to study the German military situation there with Field Marshal von Kluge. On 2 August, Warlimont met outside Paris with General Günther Blumentritt and advised him that Hitler wanted the Germans to regain the offensive initiative against the Allies through Operation Lüttich. Later, Warlimont urged General Heinrich Eberbach to continue his attacks in the Falaise pocket region. Although all the German generals informed Warlimont that they believed the attack would fail, he cabled Hitler that the generals were "confident of success".

At Warlimont's request, due to his dizzy spells resulting from the 20 July assassination bombing against Hitler, he was transferred and retired to the OKH Command Pool (the Führerreserve), and was not further employed during the war.

== Trial and conviction ==
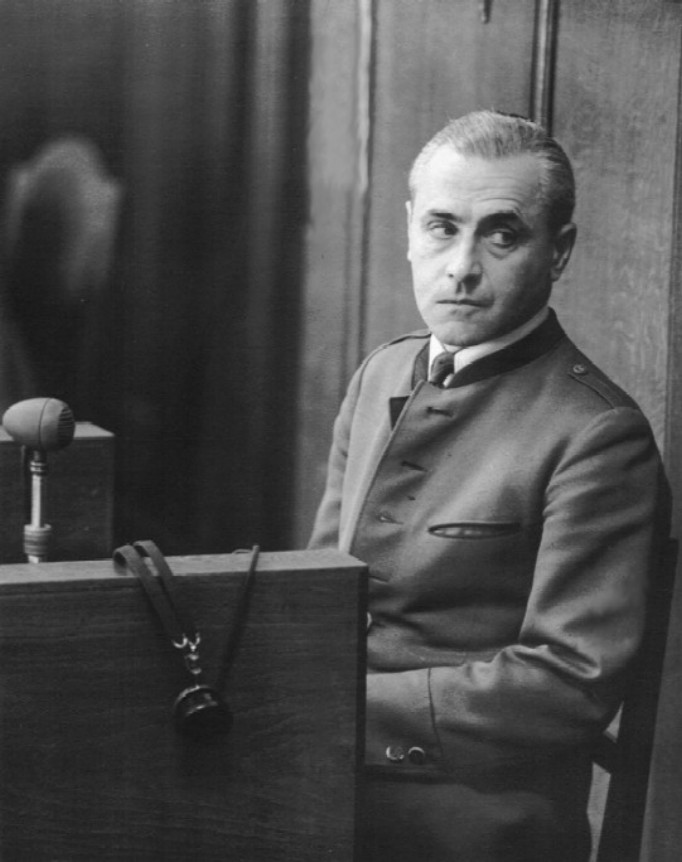
Warlimont at the Nuremberg Trials, 1948.

In October 1948, Warlimont was tried before a United States military tribunal in the High Command Trial, part of the Subsequent Nuremberg Trials. He was convicted and sentenced to life imprisonment, in part for his responsibility for drafting the Barbarossa Jurisdiction Order which allowed the murder of civilians on the pretext of counteracting partisan activity. He also signed the order to execute Russian political Commissars on sight. His sentence was reviewed by the "Peck Panel", which made a more lenient recommendation. This leniency was heavily criticized by Robert R. Bowie who stated: "they [Reinecke, Kuechler and Warlimont] were all directly implicated in the program which encompassed the murder of commandos, commissars and captured allied airmen as well as in brutal mistreatment of prisoners of war". His sentence was commuted to 18 years in 1951. He was released in June 1954.

== Personal life ==
Walter Warlimont was a son of Louis Warlimont (1857–1923) and Anna Rinck (1860–1931). His parents came from Eupen, today part of the German-speaking Community of Belgium, and migrated to Osnabrück. His father was a bookseller and antiquarian.

In 1927 Walter Warlimont married Anita von Kleydorff (1899–1987), daughter of Franz Egenieff (born Marian Eberhard Franz Emil von Kleydorff), a son of Prince Emil zu Sayn-Wittgenstein-Berleburg and US-born Paula Busch, a niece of Adolphus Busch.

His brother was head of a factory in Vienna which made components for the V-2 rocket, using forced labour from the Soviet Union.

In 1962, Warlimont wrote Im Hauptquartier der deutschen Wehrmacht 1939–1945, translated as Inside Hitler's Headquarters 1939–1945. He died in 1976 in Kreuth near the Tegernsee.

== See also ==
- Commando Order
- Commissar Order
