= Walter Ulfig =

German film score composer

Walter Ulfig (13 July 1901 – 29 June 1979) was a German composer of film scores.

== Selected filmography ==
- Das Meer (1927)
- Venus im Frack (1927)
- Svengali (1927)
- Bigamie (1927)
- Homesick (1927)
- The Awakening of Woman (1927)
- The Famous Woman (1927)
- Alpine Tragedy (1927)
- The Strange Case of Captain Ramper (1927)
- Assassination (1927)
- Queen Louise (1927)
- Homesick (1927)
- Das Schicksal einer Nacht (1927)
- The Hunt for the Bride (1927)
- The Orlov (1927)
- Serenissimus and the Last Virgin (1928)
- Mariett Dances Today (1928))
- The Woman from Till 12 (1928)
- The Beloved of His Highness (1928)
- The Schorrsiegel Affair (1928)
- It Attracted Three Fellows (1928)
- Miss Chauffeur (1928)
- The King of Carnival (1928)
- The Weekend Bride (1928)
- Honeymoon (1928)
- Spring Awakening (1929)
- The Right of the Unborn (1929)
- The Heath Is Green (1932)
- Höllentempo (1933)
- The Two Seals (1934)
- Pappi (1934)
- Mädchenräuber (1936)

== Bibliography ==
- Jung, Uli & Schatzberg, Walter. Beyond Caligari: The Films of Robert Wiene. Berghahn Books, 1999.
