= The Buddenbrooks (1923 film) =

1923 film

- Promotional film poster
- German: Die Buddenbrooks
- Directed by: Gerhard Lamprecht
- Written by: Alfred Fekete; Luise Heilborn-Körbitz; Gerhard Lamprecht; Thomas Mann (novel)
- Produced by: Albert Pommer
- Starring: Peter Esser; Mady Christians; Alfred Abel
- Cinematography: Herbert Stephan; Erich Waschneck
- Music by: Giuseppe Becce
- Production company: Dea-Film
- Distributed by: UFA
- Release date: 31 August 1923
- Country: Germany
- Languages: Silent; German intertitles

The Buddenbrooks (1923)

The Buddenbrooks (German: Die Buddenbrooks) is a 1923 German silent film directed by Gerhard Lamprecht and starring Peter Esser, Mady Christians, and Alfred Abel. It is based on Thomas Mann's 1901 novel The Buddenbrooks.

The film's art direction was by Otto Moldenhauer.

== Cast ==
- Peter Esser as Thomas Buddenbrook
- Mady Christians as Gerda Arnoldsen
- Alfred Abel as Christian Buddenbrook
- Hildegard Imhof as Tony Buddenbrook
- Mathilde Sussin as Elisabeth Buddenbrook
- Franz Egenieff as Reeder Arnoldsen
- Rudolf del Zopp as Consul Krüger
- Auguste Prasch-Grevenberg as Babette, Consul's wife
- Ralph Arthur Roberts as Bendix Grünlich, agent
- Kurt Vespermann as Renee Throta
- Elsa Wagner as Sesemi Weichbrodt
- Charlotte Böcklin as Aline Puvogel
- Emil Heyse as Kesselmeyer
- Robert Leffler as Kapitän Kloot
- Rudolf Lettinger as Coachman Grobleben
- Philipp Manning
- Karl Platen as Pokurist
- Friedrich Traeger as mayor Oeverdieck
- Hermann Vallentin as smith
