= Two Brothers (1929 film) =

1929 film

- Directed by: Mikhail Dubson
- Written by: M. Spektor
- Starring: Hilde Jennings; Maria Forescu; Carl Auen
- Cinematography: Akos Farkas
- Production company: Filmproduktion Loew
- Release date: September 1929
- Country: Germany
- Languages: Silent; German intertitles

Two Brothers (German: Zwei Brüder) is a 1929 German silent film directed by Mikhail Dubson and starring Hilde Jennings, Maria Forescu and Carl Auen.

The film's sets were designed by the art director August Rinaldi.

== Cast ==
- Hilde Jennings as Evelyne
- Maria Forescu as Ihre Mutter
- Carl Auen as Eduard
- John Mylong as Michael, der Bruder
- Paul Rehkopf as Der Wirt
- Gerhard Dammann as Ein Kavalier
- Inge Jentschura as seine Freundin

== Bibliography ==
- Bock, Hans-Michael & Bergfelder, Tim. The Concise CineGraph. Encyclopedia of German Cinema. Berghahn Books, 2009.
