= Auguste Prasch-Grevenberg =

German actress

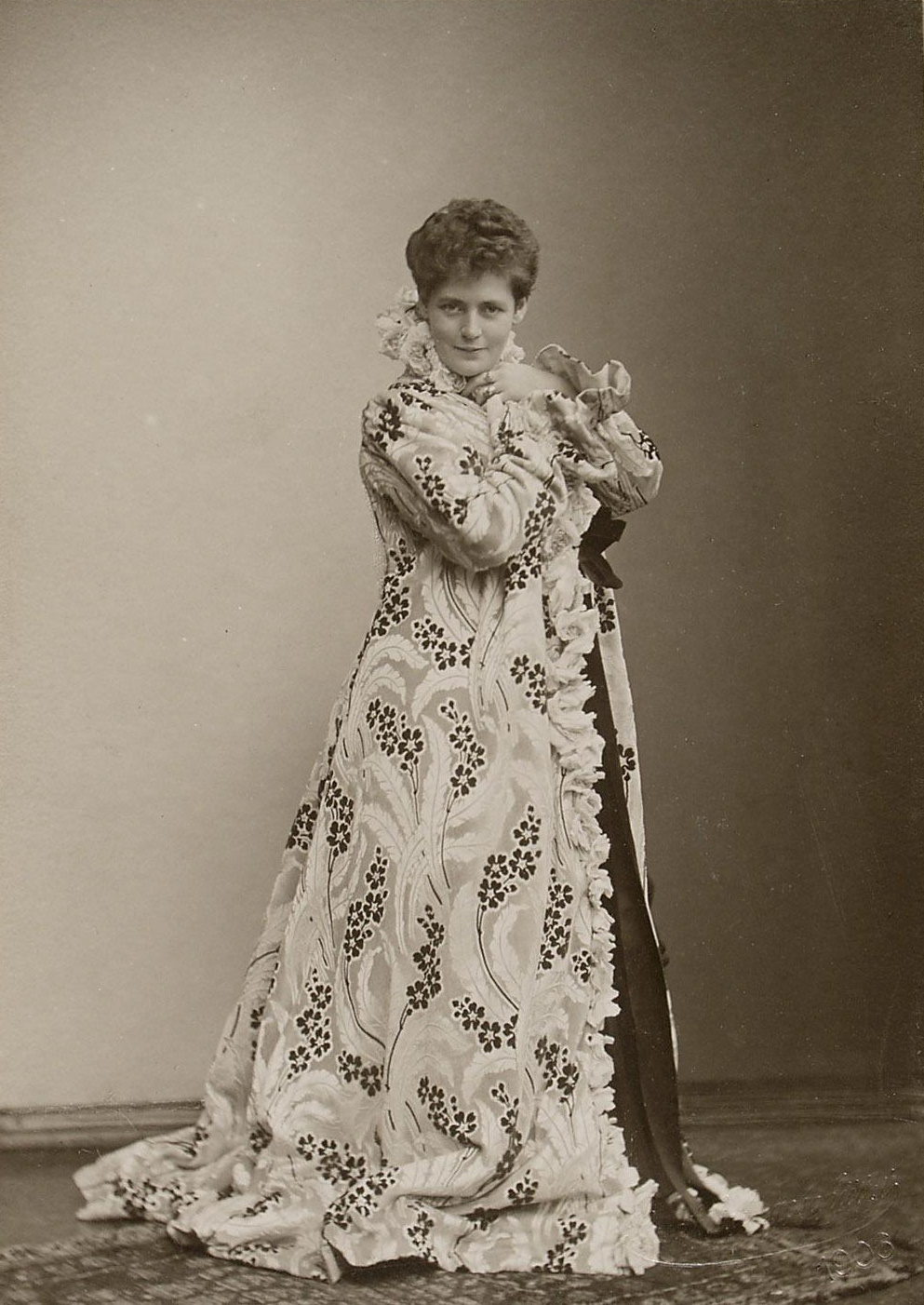
Auguste Prasch-Grevenberg ca. 1885.

Auguste Prasch-Grevenberg (22 August 1854 – 14 December 1945) was a German stage and film actress.

She was born in Darmstadt, Grand Duchy of Hesse and died in Weimar, Thuringia, Germany in 1945 at age 91.

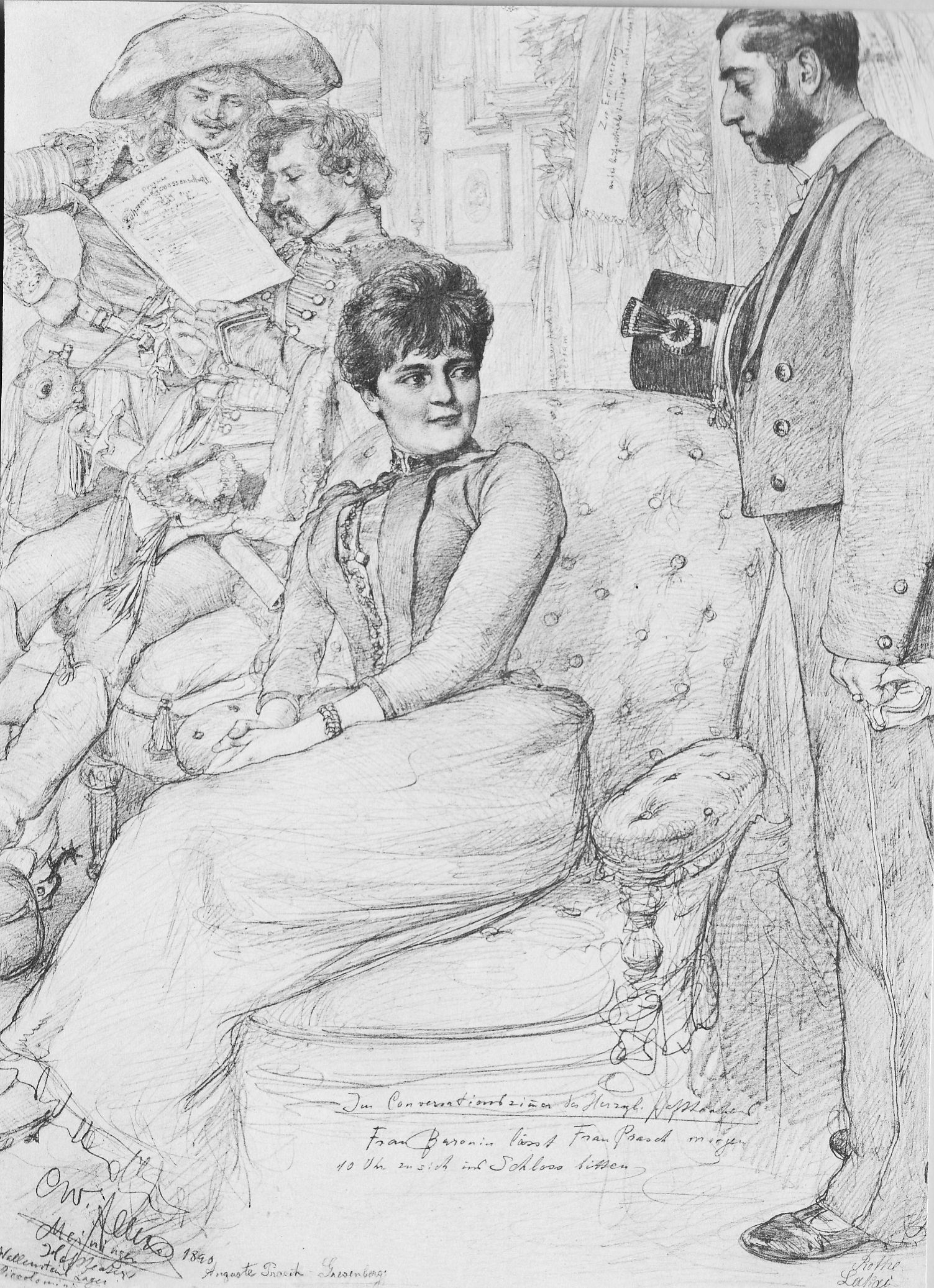
Auguste Prasch-Grevenberg sketched at the Meiningen Court Theatre, 1890.

== Selected filmography ==
- The Plague of Florence (1919)
- During My Apprenticeship (1919)
- Countess Walewska (1920)
- A Woman's Revenge (1921)
- Your Brother's Wife (1921)
- The Thirteen of Steel (1921)
- Wandering Souls (1921)
- Rose of the Asphalt Streets (1922)
- Lust for Life (1922)
- Two Worlds (1922)
- Die Buddenbrooks (1923)
- Prater (1924)
- The Assmanns (1925)
- Pique Dame (1927)
- Out of the Mist (1927)
- The Queen of Spades (1927)
- Homesick (1927)
- Queen Louise (1927–28)
- The Saint and Her Fool (1928)
- The Old Fritz (1928)
- Waterloo (1929)
- The Immortal Heart (1939)

== Bibliography ==
- Eisner, Lotte H. The Haunted Screen: Expressionism in the German Cinema and the Influence of Max Reinhardt. University of California Press, 2008.
