= The Girl from the Provinces =

1929 film directed by James Bauer

- Directed by: James Bauer
- Written by: Armin Petersen
- Starring: Anita Dorris
- Cinematography: Viktor Gluck
- Production company: Ines Internationale Spielfilm
- Release date: 1929
- Country: Germany
- Languages: Silent; German intertitles

The Girl from the Provinces (German: Das Mädel aus der Provinz) is a 1929 German silent film directed by James Bauer.

The art direction was by Robert A. Dietrich.

== Cast ==
In alphabetical order

- Fred Doederlein as Bert
- Anita Dorris as Steffi von der Heydt / Marikke Klotz
- Maria Forescu as Zimmervermieterin
- Alfred Gerasch as Dr. Harras
- Hermine Sterler as Magda Ronacher
