= The Fate of a Night =

1927 film

- German film poster
- German: Das Schicksal einer Nacht
- Directed by: Erich Schönfelder
- Written by: Stefan Zweig (novella)
- Cinematography: Mutz Greenbaum; Karl Wellert
- Music by: Walter Ulfig
- Production company: Pan Europa-Film
- Distributed by: Terra Film
- Release date: October 1927
- Country: Germany
- Languages: Silent; German intertitles

The Fate of a Night (German: Das Schicksal einer Nacht) is a 1927 German silent film directed by Erich Schönfelder. The film's sets were designed by the art director Ernst Stern.

== Cast ==
In alphabetical order

- Jean Bradin
- Edda Croy
- Hans Junkermann
- Alice Kempen
- Harry Liedtke
- Erna Morena
- Paul Otto
- Albert Paulig
- Adele Sandrock
- Hermine Sterler
