= Sajenko the Soviet =

1928 film

- Directed by: Erich Waschneck
- Written by: Bobby E. Lüthge; Erich Waschneck
- Produced by: Alfred Zeisler
- Starring: Michael Bohnen; Suzy Vernon; Walter Rilla
- Cinematography: Friedl Behn-Grund
- Music by: Giuseppe Becce
- Production company: UFA
- Distributed by: UFA
- Release date: 29 February 1928
- Country: Germany
- Languages: Silent; German intertitles

Sajenko the Soviet (German: Die geheime Macht) is a 1928 German silent drama film directed by Erich Waschneck and starring Michael Bohnen, Suzy Vernon and Walter Rilla. It was shot at the Babelsberg Studios in Berlin. The film's sets were designed by the art director Jacek Rotmil.

== Cast ==
- Michael Bohnen as Sajenko
- Suzy Vernon as Prinzessin Sinaide
- Walter Rilla as Mirow, Sekretär des Handelsbüros
- Henry Stuart as Edward, der Sohn von P.L. Harland
- Truus van Aalten as Lilian, Edwards Schwester
- Paul Otto as Major Raschoff
- Ferdinand von Alten as Baron Sterny
- Rudolf Biebrach as Admiral Reeve
- Leopold Kramer as Fürst Balyzin
- Max Magnus as Leutnant Daboro
- Max Maximilian as Pferdeknecht Kosma
- Alexander Murski
- Ossip Darmatow

== Bibliography ==
- Bock, Hans-Michael & Bergfelder, Tim. The Concise CineGraph. Encyclopedia of German Cinema. Berghahn Books, 2009.
