= A Woman's Revenge (1921 film) =

1921 film directed by Robert Wiene

- Directed by: Robert Wiene
- Written by: Jules Amédée Barbey d'Aurevilly (novella); Robert Wiene
- Produced by: Paul Ebner]br />Maxim Galitzenstein
- Starring: Vera Karalli; Franz Egenieff; Olga Engl; Margarete Kupfer
- Cinematography: Erich Waschneck
- Production company: Maxim-Film
- Distributed by: UFA
- Release date: April 1921
- Country: Germany
- Languages: Silent; German intertitles

A Woman's Revenge (German: Die Rache einer Frau) is a 1921 German silent drama film directed by Robert Wiene and starring Vera Karalli, Franz Egenieff and Olga Engl. In order to punish her cold, brutal aristocratic husband for murdering her lover, a woman becomes a common prostitute to shame him. The film received largely negative reviews.

== Cast ==
- Vera Karalli
- Franz Egenieff - Herzog von Sierra-Leone
- Olga Engl
- Margarete Kupfer
- Alfred Haase
- Boris Michailow - Geliebter der Herzogin
- Auguste Prasch-Grevenberg

== Bibliography ==
- Jung, Uli & Schatzberg, Walter. Beyond Caligari: The Films of Robert Wiene. Berghahn Books, 1999.
