= Hundred Days (film) =

1935 film

- Directed by: Franz Wenzler
- Written by: Karl Vollmöller; Franz Wenzler
- Based on: Campo di Maggio by Benito Mussolini and Giovacchino Forzano
- Produced by: Ferrucio Bianchi; Kurt Heinz
- Starring: Werner Krauss; Gustaf Gründgens; Eduard von Winterstein
- Cinematography: Mario Albertelli; Augusto Tiezzi
- Edited by: Carl Otto Bartning
- Music by: Giuseppe Becce
- Production company: Consorzio Vis Tirrenia
- Distributed by: Rota Filmverleih
- Release date: 22 March 1935
- Running time: 90 minutes
- Countries: Germany; Italy
- Language: German

Hundred Days (German: Hundert Tage) is a 1935 German-Italian historical drama film directed by Franz Wenzler and starring Werner Krauss, Gustaf Gründgens and Eduard von Winterstein. The film depicts the Hundred Days campaign of 1815 which led to the final defeat of Napoleon at the Battle of Waterloo. It was shot at the Pisorno Studios in Tirrenia and on location on the island of Elba. The film's sets were designed by the art director Antonio Valente. It was based on a play by the Italian dictator Benito Mussolini which he co-wrote with Giovacchino Forzano. A separate Italian-language version Campo di Maggio was also made directed by Forzano with only Rose Stradner, who played Napoleon's wife Marie Louise, appearing in both versions.

== Synopsis ==
In February 1815 Napoleon leaves Elba and lands in France with a small force of loyal troops, swiftly ousting the restored French monarchy of Louis XVIII. The Allied leaders, meeting at the Congress of Vienna when he escaped, respond by forging a fresh coalition to defeat him spearheaded by Blücher and Wellington near Brussels. The scheming Minister of Police Joseph Fouché who rallied to Napoleon after his escape, is already plotting a Second restoration for exiled King Louis. The Hundred Days campaign ends in a decisive defeat for Napoleon at the Battle of Waterloo. He is forced to abdicate and sent to the Atlantic island of Saint Helena as a prisoner of the British.

== Cast ==
- Werner Krauss as Napoleon
- Gustaf Gründgens as Fouché
- Kurt Junker as Metternich
- Eduard von Winterstein as Blücher
- Alfred Gerasch as Talleyrand
- Peter Voß as Wellington
- Fritz Genschow as Lucien
- Elsa Wagner as Laetitia
- Rose Stradner as Maria Louise
- Fred Doederlein as Neipperg
- Ernst Legal as Louis XVIII
- Carl Wilhelm Tetting as Le Comte d'Artois
- Rudolf Schündler as Gaillard
- Peter Erkelenz as Lafayette
- Oscar Marion as Schaumburg
- Heinz von Cleve as Oberst Collet
- Paul Mederow as Grouchy
- Hans Adalbert Schlettow as Davout
- Josef Peterhans as Maréchal Soult
- Friedrich Gnaß as Ney

== Bibliography ==
- Klaus, Ulrich J. Deutsche Tonfilme: Jahrgang 1935. Klaus-Archiv, 1988.
- Klossner, Michael. The Europe of 1500-1815 on Film and Television: A Worldwide Filmography of Over 2550 Works, 1895 Through 2000. McFarland & Company, 2002.
- Winkel, Roel Vande & Welch, David. Cinema and the Swastika: The International Expansion of Third Reich Cinema. Palgrave MacMillan, 2011
