= Bigamy (1927 film) =

1927 film

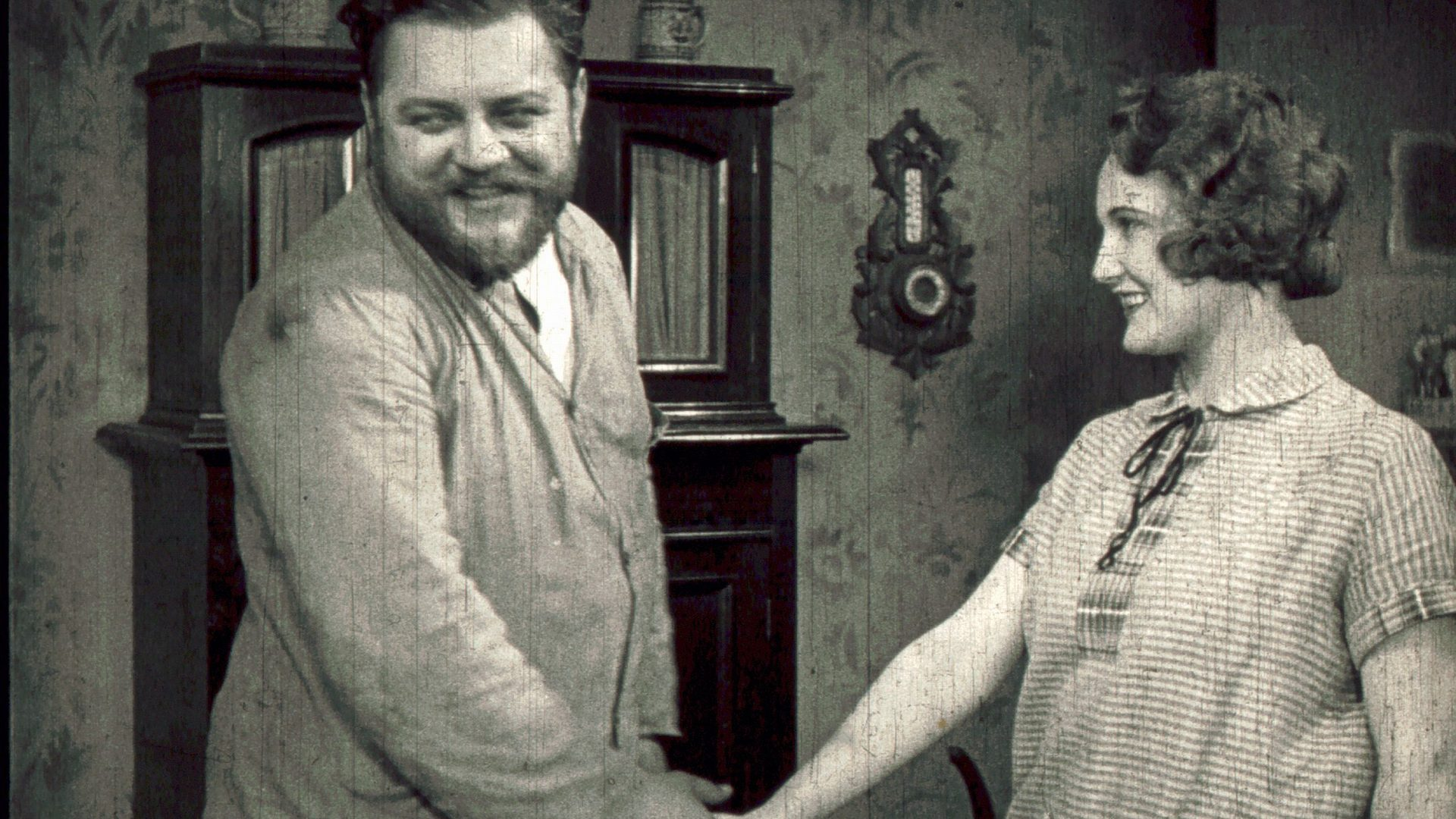
- Directed by: Jaap Speyer
- Written by: Max Glass
- Produced by: Max Glass
- Starring: Heinrich George; Maria Jacobini; Anita Dorris; Ernő Verebes
- Cinematography: Arpad Viragh
- Music by: Walter Ulfig
- Production company: Terra Film
- Distributed by: Terra Film
- Release date: 27 September 1927
- Country: Germany
- Languages: Silent; German intertitles

Bigamy (German: Bigamie) is a 1927 German silent drama film directed by Jaap Speyer and starring Heinrich George, Maria Jacobini, and Anita Dorris.

== Cast ==
- Heinrich George as Otto Engel
- Maria Jacobini as Ada
- Anita Dorris as Elise
- Ernő Verebes as Tänzer Fred
- Theodor Loos as Lawyer
- Hans Mierendorff as Manager
- Karl Etlinger as Geselle
- Gerhard Ritterband as Lehrling
- Maria Forescu as Artistin
- Else Reval as Artistin
- Emil Heyse
- Emil Lind
- Johannes Riemann
- Georg H. Schnell

== Plot ==
Plumber Otto Engel has been abandoned by his wife Ada. He gets along really well with Elise, the girl living above his workshop and store. When he finally musters up the courage to ask her out to a variety show, he is utterly shocked to see his runaway wife Ada on stage as a dancer. Otto and Ada decide to try and patch up their marriage, so she returns home. But the theatre keeps drawing Ada and after a short time she leaves for the second time. Elise puts Otto back on his feet again and the two choose to live together. When Ada does not respond to his request for divorce, Otto arranges a false death certificate. Otto and Elise get married, are happy and have a son. Until Ada suddenly returns and accuses Otto of bigamy. In court, Ada is deeply impressed by Elise and Otto's son. She takes some poison and dies on the spot. The Engel family can live on in peace.

== Bibliography ==
- Bock, Hans-Michael; Bergfelder, Tim, eds. (2009). The Concise Cinegraph: Encyclopaedia of German Cinema. New York: Berghahn Books. ISBN 978-1-57181-655-9.
