= The Fall of Jerusalem =

1922 film

- Directed by: Eugen Illés
- Written by: Rudolf Kellaren; Paul Lerch
- Cinematography: Eugen Hamm; Hans Mönling
- Production company: Spera-Film
- Distributed by: Spera-Film
- Release date: 26 October 1922
- Country: Germany
- Languages: Silent; German intertitles

The Fall of Jerusalem (German:Jeremias) is a 1922 German silent historical film directed by Eugen Illés and starring Carl de V. Hundt, Theodor Becker and Jaro Fürth.

The film's art direction was by Siegfried Wroblewsky.

== Cast ==
- Carl de V. Hundt as Jeremiah
- Theodor Becker as Nebuchadnezzar, Babylonian King
- Jaro Fürth as Bachur, der falsche Prophet
- Werner Hollmann as King Zedekiah of Judea
- Georg John as Egyptian Emissary
- Mara Markhoff as Rahel, Jeremiah's daughter
- Cordy Millowitsch as Esther, Queen of Judea
- Walter Rilla as Amosa, Captain of the Guard
- Sacy von Blondel as Mirjam, Jeremiah's daughter
- Wilhelm von Haxthausen as Maskir, Schatzmeister des Königs

== Bibliography ==
- Hans-Michael Bock and Tim Bergfelder. The Concise Cinegraph: An Encyclopedia of German Cinema. Berghahn Books.
