= Marshal Forwards (film) =

1932 film

- Paul Wegener (right) as Blücher
- Directed by: Heinz Paul
- Written by: Arzén von Cserépy; Hella Moja; Heinz Paul
- Starring: Paul Wegener; Traute Carlsen; Hans Graf von Schwerin
- Cinematography: Viktor Gluck; Carl Hoffmann
- Music by: Willy Schmidt-Gentner
- Production company: Biograph-Film
- Distributed by: Biograph-Film
- Release date: 23 November 1932
- Running time: 101 minutes
- Country: Germany
- Language: German

Marshal Forwards (German: Marschall Vorwärts) is a 1932 German historical war film directed by Heinz Paul and starring Paul Wegener, Traute Carlsen and Hans Graf von Schwerin.

It portrays the life of Gebhard Leberecht von Blücher, a German hero of the Napoleonic Wars who was present at the Battle of Leipzig and the Battle of Waterloo. It takes its name from Blücher's contemporary nickname, which came from his aggressive forward-thinking stance. It is part of the Prussian film genre, popular during the Weimair and Nazi eras.

== Plot ==
Prussia at the time of the Napoleonic attack in the early 19th century. The country can hardly defend itself against the attacks of the French. The battle of Jena and Auerstedt was lost in 1806, Berlin was occupied, King Friedrich Wilhelm III. and Queen Luise have fled to Memel, far in the northeast of the country. Near Ratekau, near Lübeck, the popular old marshal Blücher, a veritable warhorse, had to capitulate to the overwhelming enemy because he ran out of food and ammunition. Since Prussia's alliance with Russia still exists, however, all does not seem lost. Blücher is exchanged for a captured French general. Immediately, he goes to his king in Memel to ask the monarch to join forces for an attack against the French aggressors. Here, however, Blücher learns that Russia has its own agenda and is unwilling to take action against Napoleon alongside the Prussians. The almost 70-year-old General Blücher resigns himself to the circumstances. After the humiliating French peace dictate of Tilsit in 1807, in which Prussia largely relinquished its independence to the French, he retires to his country estate, deeply disappointed.

In several fiery letters to his king, the aged marshal urges Friedrich Wilhelm not to accept the fate imposed on his country by Napoleon. The choleric Corsican emperor gets wind of it and forces the Prussian king to finally send Blücher into retirement. When Napoleon's fortunes reverse and his armies get stuck in the endless expanses of Russia, the aged Blücher feels a new impetus. In particular, the Prussian-Russian agreement of 1812 known as the Tauroggen Convention means that France can no longer rely on Prussian units serving as auxiliaries. Blücher, now appointed by the king to head the Prussian army, rallies his followers around him and a new strategy for defeating Napoleon is discussed. Allied with the Russians, Prussia experiences a number of defeats and minor victories, but when the Austrians join the alliance, Napoleon's army suffers a painful defeat at the Battle of the Nations near Leipzig. Blücher's relentless forward drive eventually earns him the nickname "Marshal Forwards".

== Production ==
Marschall Forward was created on 22 July 1932 in the Johannisthal Studios in Berlin. The film had ten acts and was 2780 meters long. On 24 October 1932, the censorship released him for young people. The premiere took place on 23 November 1932 in Berlin's Titania Palace and in the atrium.

Producer August Mueller was also production manager, Harry Dettmann production manager. The film constructions come from the hands of Robert A. Dietrich (design) and Bruno Lutz (execution). Composer Willy Schmidt-Gentner also had the musical direction. Hermann Birkhofer provided the sound. Georg von Viebahn served as a military advisor.

== Cast ==
- Paul Wegener as Blücher
- Traute Carlsen as Malchen, seine Frau
- Hans Graf von Schwerin as Franz, sein Sohn
- Elga Brink as Friederike, dessen Frau
- Theodor Loos as König Friedrich Wilhelm III. von Preußen
- Friedrich Kayßler as Scharnhorst
- Paul Richter as Gneisenau
- Fritz Alberti as Hardenberg
- Josef Peterhans as Yorck
- Eduard Rothauser as Kaiser Franz
- Carl Auen as Zar Alexander
- Alfred Durra as Napoleon
- Anton Pointner as Schwarzenberg
- W. von Herwarth as Nostitz
- Hans Adalbert Schlettow as Rittmeister von Oppen
- Michael von Newlinsky as Rittmeister von Horn
- Oskar Marion as Goltz
- Alfred Gerasch as Metternich
- Paul Biensfeldt as Kalckreuth
- Bruno Ziener as Humboldt
- F.W. Schröder-Schrom as Nesselroth
- H. Graf von Einsiedel as Adjutant des Königs
- Ernst Rückert as Adjutant Napoleons
- Philipp Manning as Bürgermeister von Leipzig
- Ferdinand von Alten as Französischer Gesandter
- Fred Goebel as Französischer Parlamentär
- Arthur Reinhardt as Wilhelm, Blüchers Bursche

== Bibliography ==
- Grange, William (2008). Cultural Chronicle of the Weimar Republic. Scarecrow Press. ISBN 978-0-8108-5967-8.
