= Leopold Kramer =

Austrian actor

- Kramer in 1918
- Born: 29 September 1869; Prague, Austria-Hungary (now Czech Republic)
- Died: 29 October 1942 (aged 73); Vienna, Nazi Germany (now Austria)
- Spouse: Josefine Kramer-Glöckner

Leopold Kramer (29 September 1869 – 29 October 1942) was an Austrian stage and film actor.

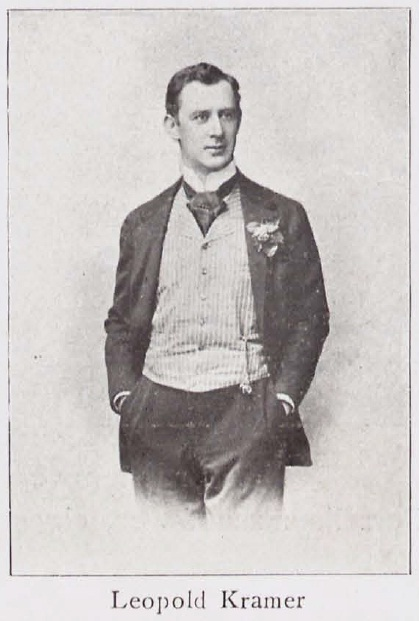
Kramer in 1900

== Selected filmography ==
- The Eye of the Buddha (1919)
- Ungarische Rhapsodie (1928)
- Frauenarzt Dr. Schäfer (1928)
- Die geheime Macht (1928)
- Sajenko the Soviet (1928)
- The Woman on the Rack (1928)
- Honour Thy Mother (1928)
- Hungarian Rhapsody (1928)
- Was kostet Liebe? (1929)
- Money on the Street (1930)
- The Ringer (1932)
- Ekstase (1933)
- Two Good Comrades (1933)
- The Racokzi March (1933)
- Rakoczy-Marsch (1935)

== Bibliography ==
- Jung, Uli & Schatzberg, Walter. Beyond Caligari: The Films of Robert Wiene. Berghahn Books, 1999.
