= Max Ehrlich =

German actor, screenwriter and comedian (1892–1944)

- Max Ehrlich on stage in a prisoners' cabaret show in the Nazi concentration camp Westerbork in 1943
- Born: 7 December 1892; Berlin, German Empire
- Died: 1 October 1944 (aged 51); Auschwitz-Birkenau, German-occupied Poland
- Cause of death: Murdered by Carbon monoxide poisoning
- Occupations: Actor, screenwriter, director
- Years active: 1926–1944

Max Michaelis Ehrlich (7 December 1892 – 1 October 1944) was a German Jewish actor, screenwriter, and director on the German theater, comedy and cabaret scene of the 1930s.

Ehrlich began his career in the 1920s at various theatres, including leading roles in Max Reinhardt productions and revues. He appeared in 42 films, ten of which he directed, and on eight records. He wrote several books, including From Adelbert to Zilzer, his best-selling humorous collection of stories and anecdotes about sixty-two of his best known show business friends and colleagues.

== Career in Nazi Germany ==
In 1933, the National Socialists seized power and stopped Ehrlich and his other Jewish colleagues from working in Germany. As a result, he left for Vienna to appear with the Rudolf Nelson Revue. However, there too, Austrian anti-Semites interrupted the show with cries of "Jews, get out of Vienna." Consequently, the troupe left for The Netherlands, stopping en route for stage appearances in Switzerland.

In 1935, Ehrlich returned to Nazi Germany. Jewish entertainers were permitted to perform there but only within the framework of the Jüdischer Kulturbund (Jewish Cultural Union) and exclusively in front of Jewish audiences. Ehrlich was named director of the Kulturbund's light theatre departments. However, following the 1938 pogrom "Kristallnacht," he decided to leave Germany definitively. As both of his farewell performances sold out, a third presentation on 2 April 1939 was added. Ehlich's April 1939 presentation was his final appearance in Germany.

== Westerbork ==
Subsequently, he returned to the Netherlands and joined Willy Rosen's "Theater der Prominenten" (Theatre of Celebrities). His appearance in the "Theater der Prominenten" was shortlived, however, as Ehrlich was imprisoned in the Westerbork concentration camp. While at Westerbork, he created and became director of the "Camp Westerbork Theatre Group," a cabaret troupe that, during its eighteen-month existence, staged six major theatre productions, all within the concentration camp's confines. A majority of the actors were famous Jewish show business personalities; prominent artists from Berlin and Vienna, such as Willy Rosen, Erich Ziegler, Camilla Spira, and Kurt Gerron; or well known Dutch performers, like Esther Philipse, Jetty Cantor, and Johnny & Jones. At its highest point, the group counted fifty-one members, including a full team of musicians, dancers, choreographers, artists, tailors, and make-up, lighting, and other technicians, as well as stage hands.

Most of the shows combined elements of revue and cabaret –songs and sketches– but, on one occasion, the program included a revue-operetta, Ludmilla, or Corpses Everywhere—a production whose theme was set to predict the actors' and other prisoners' fate. While some scenes were implicitly critical, the Theatre Group at no time produced openly political cabaret or directly attacked the Nazi regime. To do so would have violated the most fundamental condition for the troupe's and its members' survival, as life in Westerbork was dominated by the persistent threat of deportation on the next transport to an unknown but deeply feared fate in the East.

This artistic activity provided both audiences and performers with an opportunity to retain a sense of humanity, briefly step away from the tragedy of daily life and nourish the illusion of survival.

== Death ==
During the summer of 1944, increasing numbers of transports carried Westerbork's prisoners to the extermination camps in the East. Of 104,000 camp inmates, fewer than 5,000 survived. In the last transport to leave Westerbork, on 3 September 1944, Ehrlich was number 151 on the list of victims. Eyewitnesses recount that, after reaching Auschwitz, he was recognized by a Hauptsturmführer. As a result, Ehrlich was subjected to additional torture: brought before a group of SS officers holding their loaded guns aimed at him, he was ordered to tell jokes. On 1 October 1944, Ehrlich was murdered in the Auschwitz gas chambers.

On 12 April 1945, British troops liberated Westerbork. By then, only 876 prisoners were left: 464 men, 309 women, and 229 children; only two were Theatre Group members.

== Filmography ==
=== Actor ===
- We'll Meet Again in the Heimat (1926)
- Family Gathering in the House of Prellstein (1927)
- Herkules Maier (1928)
- The Blue Mouse (1928)
- Honeymoon (1928)
- Die tolle Komteß (1928)
- German Wine (1928)
- Her Dark Secret (1929)
- The Black Domino (1929)
- Vienna, City of Song (1930)
- Hocuspocus (1930)
- Fairground People (1930)
- The Corvette Captain (1930)
- Leutnant warst Du einst bei deinen Husaren (1930)
- Susanne Cleans Up (1930)
- Kabarett-Programm Nr. 2 (short film, 1931)
- Kabarett-Programm Nr. 6 (short film, 1931)
- Madame Pompadour (1931)
- Der Tanzhusar (1931)
- In Wien hab' ich einmal ein Mädel geliebt (1931)
- By a Nose (1931)
- Der Storch streikt. Siegfried der Matrose (1931)
- The Soaring Maiden (1931)
- The Schlemihl (1931)
- Der Hochtourist (1931)
- Goldblondes Mädchen, ich schenk Dir mein Herz – Ich bin ja so verliebt... (1931/32)
- The Magic Top Hat (1932)
- Wer zahlt heute noch? (short film, 1932)
- When Love Sets the Fashion (1932)
- Herr Direktor engagiert (short film, 1932/33)

=== Director ===
- Revierkrank (short film, 1932)
- Die erste Instruktionsstunde (short film, 1932)
- Kaczmarek als Rosenkavalier (short film, 1932/33)
- Hugos Nachtarbeit (1933)

=== Film writer ===
- It Attracted Three Fellows (1928)
- Honeymoon (1928)
- Miss Chauffeur (1928)
- In Werder the Trees are in Bloom (1928)
- The Weekend Bride (1928)
- The Crazy Countess (1928)
- The House Without Men (1928)
- A Small Down Payment on Bliss (1928/29)
- Mascots (1928/29)
- The Copper (1930)
- Hugo's Nachtarbeit (short film, 1933)

== Bibliography ==
- Heulen und Zähneklappern, Das Buch der Faulen Witze by Max Ehrlich and Paul Morgan; Eden-Verlag Berlin 1927
- Von Adelbert bis Zilzer by Max Ehrlich; Eden-Verlag Berlin 1928, OL 2112986M
- Special Max Reinhardt Jubilee edition: Blätter des deutschen Theaters by Willi Schaeffers, Max Ehrlich and Paul Morgan
