= Student Life in Merry Springtime =

1931 film

- Directed by: Heinz Paul
- Written by: Josef Buchhorn; Alfred Schirokauer; Hella Moja
- Starring: Franz Baumann; Anita Dorris; Fritz Alberti
- Cinematography: Viktor Gluck
- Music by: Ernst Erich Buder
- Production company: Ines Internationale Spielfilm
- Distributed by: Werner Film-Verleih
- Release date: 19 January 1931
- Running time: 65 minutes
- Country: Germany
- Language: German

Student Life in Merry Springtime (German: Student sein, wenn die Veilchen blühen) is a 1931 German musical film directed by Heinz Paul and starring Franz Baumann and Fritz Alberti. The film's sets were designed by the art director Robert A. Dietrich.

== Cast ==
- Franz Baumann as Gert Simmers
- Anita Dorris as Lisbeth - seine Schwester
- Fritz Alberti as Deren Vater
- Fred Louis Lerch as Fred Droysen
- Edith Schollwer as Aenne Winter
- Else Reval as Mutter von Aenne
- Ernst Behmer as Vater von Aenne
- Paul Biensfeldt as Buchhalter bei Simmers
- Karl Platen as Der Professor
- Hans Hamm as Student Mog
- Henry Pleß as Student
- Willy Clever as Student
- Paul Ceblin as Student
- Hans Tost as Student
- Robert Thiem as Student

== Bibliography ==
- The Film Daily Year Book of Motion Pictures. Film Daily, 1933.
