= Struggling Souls =

1918 film

- Directed by: Eugen Illés
- Written by: Lothar Schmidt (novel)
- Produced by: Paul Davidson
- Cinematography: Eugen Illés
- Production company: PAGU
- Distributed by: UFA
- Release date: 18 October 1918
- Running time: 69 minutes
- Country: Germany
- Languages: Silent; German intertitles

Struggling Souls (German: Ringende Seelen) is a 1918 German silent drama film directed by Eugen Illés.

It was shot at the Tempelhof Studios in Berlin. The film's sets were designed by the art director Kurt Richter.

== Cast ==
- Gilda Langer as Gerda Vanini, the dancing girl
- Werner Hollmann as von Sandenstein
- Martha Angerstein-Licho as Doris, née Amberg, his wife

== Bibliography ==
- Alfred Krautz. International directory of cinematographers, set- and costume designers in film, Volume 4. Saur, 1984.
