= Valerie Boothby =

German actress (1906-1982)

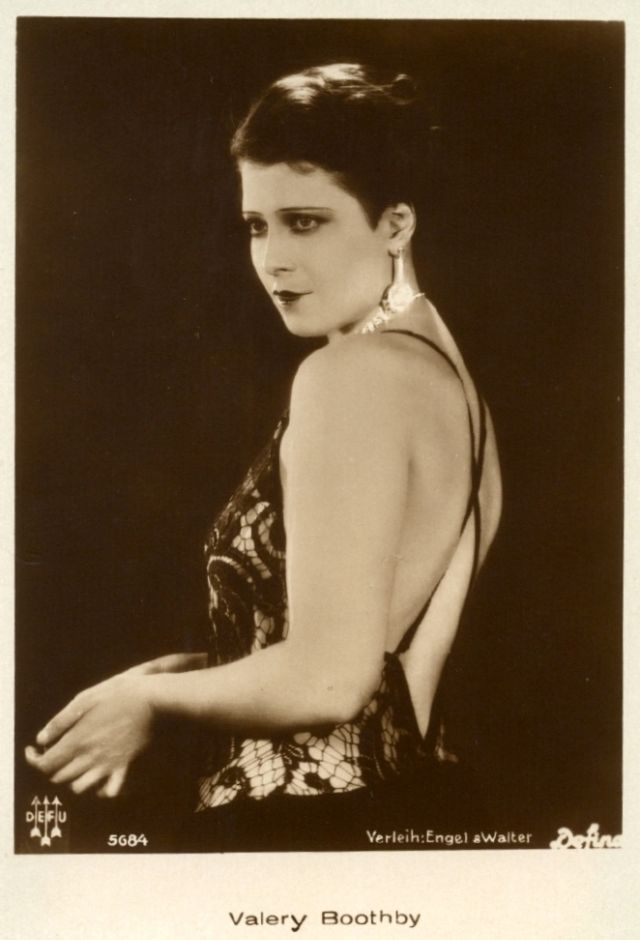
- Born: Wally Drucker; 18 October 1904; Hamburg-Mitte, Hamburg, German Empire
- Died: 14 April 1982 (aged 77); Hamburg-Mitte, Hamburg, West Germany
- Resting place: Neuer Friedhof Harburg, Harburg, Hamburg, Germany
- Other names: Valery Boothby; Contessa Valerie Boothby-Colonna
- Years active: 1926–1931

Valerie Boothby (born Wally Drucker, 18 October 1904 – 14 April 1982) was a German actress, painter, and writer.

== Biography ==
Valerie Boothby was born Wally Drucker on 18 October 1904 in Hamburg-Mitte, Hamburg, in what was then the German Empire, although some sources list her birth year as 1906. Her father was Ernst Drucker (1856–1918), an actor and theater owner. She was the oldest of three daughters and was of German-Jewish ancestry.

She made her film debut in 1926 in The Clever Fox, directed by Conrad Wiene, and went on to appear in 22 more films, mainly typecast as a vamp, before retiring in 1931.

Upon the rise of the Nazis in 1933, Boothby left Berlin and settled in France. She also lived in Cairo, Egypt for 15 years before returning to Hamburg in 1970, where she died on 14 April 1982. She is buried at Neuer Friedhof Harburg in Harburg, Hamburg, Germany. She was married to a noble Italian lawyer.

== Selected filmography ==
- The Clever Fox (1926)
- The Woman with the World Record (1927)
- Because I Love You (1928)
- Life's Circus (1928)
- Adam and Eve (1928)
- Angst (1928)
- Das letzte Souper (1928)
- The Monte Cristo of Prague (1929)
- Women on the Edge (1929)
- Crucified Girl (1929)
- Death Drive for the World Record (1929)
- Hunting You (1929)
- Inherited Passions (1929)
- The Man Without Love (1929)
- Namensheirat (1930)
- Him or Me (1930)
- Marriage in Name Only (1930)
- Der Herr Finanzdirektor (1931)
- Johann Strauss (1931)
