= Hans Jacoby (art director) =

German art director (1898–1967)

- Born: 5 December 1898; Berlin, German Empire
- Died: 19 December 1967 (aged 69); Buenos Aires, Argentina
- Other name: Juan Jacoby Renard
- Occupation: Art director
- Years active: 1921–1949 (film)

Hans Jacoby (1898–1967) was a German art director who designed the film sets for many German productions. He worked for a number of companies during the Weimar Era, notably Bavaria Film, Terra Film and Universum Film AG. Of Jewish background, he emigrated to Austria following the Nazi takeover in Germany, where he worked on The Eternal Mask (1935). He later emigrated to Argentina where he worked under the name Juan Jacoby Renard and also directed one film Sombras en el río in 1939. He was employed by the Argentina Sono Film company.

== Selected filmography ==
- Four Around a Woman (1921)
- Driving Force (1921)
- Demon Circus (1923)
- The Other Woman (1924)
- The Woman Who Did (1925)
- Love Is Blind (1925)
- His Toughest Case (1926)
- Three Cuckoo Clocks (1926)
- The Little Variety Star (1926)
- Vienna – Berlin (1926)
- The Three Mannequins (1926)
- Svengali (1927)
- The Bordellos of Algiers (1927)
- Queen Louise (1927)
- The Schorrsiegel Affair (1928)
- The Three Women of Urban Hell (1928)
- The Last Night (1928)
- Miss Chauffeur (1928)
- A Woman with Style (1928)
- Misled Youth (1929)
- The Age of Seventeen (1929)
- The Woman in the Advocate's Gown (1929)
- The Right of the Unborn (1929)
- The Land of Smiles (1930)
- End of the Rainbow (1930)
- You'll Be in My Heart (1930)
- Money on the Street (1930)
- How Do I Become Rich and Happy? (1930)
- Three Days of Love (1931)
- The Big Attraction (1931)
- Storm in a Water Glass (1931)
- Three Days of Love (1931)
- Girls to Marry (1932)
- Impossible Love (1932)
- Manolescu, Prince of Thieves (1933)
- The Judas of Tyrol (1933)
- The Lost Valley (1934)
- The Eternal Mask (1935)
- Sombras en el río (1939)
- Madame Sans-Gêne (1945)

== Bibliography ==
- Giesen, Rolf. The Nosferatu Story: The Seminal Horror Film, Its Predecessors and Its Enduring Legacy. McFarland, 2019.
- Weniger, Kay. Zwischen Bühne und Baracke: Lexikon der verfolgten Theater-, Film- und Musikkünstler 1933 bis 1945. Metropol, 2008.
