= Terra Studios =

Historic film studios in Berlin

The original studios in 1913.

The Terra Studios or Marienfelde Studios were film studios located in the Berlin suburb of Marienfelde.

The studios were originally a glasshouse constructed in 1913 by the early company Eiko Film, controlled by the producer Franz Vogel who had previously been using the Sellerstrasse Studios of Rex Film. In the early 1920s Terra Film was founded and took over the studios from the defunct Eiko. It was known as the Terra-Glashaus during these years.

In 1930 the studio underwent major rebuilding following the acquisition of Terra by Eugen Scotoni, and was fitted for sound production using the Tobis-Klangfilm system. During the consolidation of the German film industry in the 1930s under the Nazi era, Terra rose to become one of the four major companies alongside UFA, Bavaria and Tobis. It continued producing at Marienfelde until the late 1930s when the further centralisation of German film production under the Nazi regime led to the downgrading of the studios, and gave Terra access to the better-equipped Berlin studios of Babelsberg, Johannisthal and Tempelhof.

== Bibliography ==
- Bach, Steven. Marlene Dietrich: Life and Legend. University of Minnesota Press, 2013.
- Kramer, Thomas & Siegrist, Dominik. Terra: ein Schweizer Filmkonzern im Dritten Reich. Chronos, 1991.
- Kreimeier, Klaus. The Ufa Story: A History of Germany's Greatest Film Company, 1918–1945.University of California Press, 1999.
- Jung, Uli & Schatzberg, Walter. Beyond Caligari: The Films of Robert Wiene. Berghahn Books, 1999.
