= List of German films of 1933 =

1933 marked a transitional year for the German film industry following the Nazi seizure of power and the beginnings of centralisation of the studios under the control of Joseph Goebbels' Ministry of Propaganda. A number of films faced censorship issues and several received only limited releases.

== A–K ==
Title	Director	Cast	Genre	Notes
All for Love	Henri-Georges Clouzot; Joe May	Jan Kiepura, Charles Dechamps, Lucien Baroux	Musical	French-language film
And the Plains Are Gleaming	Heinz Hille	Rosy Barsony, Wolf Albach-Retty, Magda Kun	Drama	Co-production with Hungary
And Who Is Kissing Me?	E.W. Emo	Georg Alexander, Felix Bressart, Margo Lion	Comedy	
Anna and Elizabeth	Frank Wisbar	Dorothea Wieck, Hertha Thiele, Mathias Wieman	Drama	
The Big Bluff	Georg Jacoby	Lee Parry, Betty Amann, Harald Paulsen	Comedy	
Bon Voyage	Alfred Abel	Magda Schneider, Max Hansen, Ekkehard Arendt	Comedy	
The Burning Secret	Robert Siodmak	Alfred Abel, Hilde Wagener, Willi Forst	Drama	
The Castle in the South	Géza von Bolváry	Liane Haid, Viktor de Kowa, Paul Kemp	Comedy	
One Night's Song	Pierre Colombier; Anatole Litvak	Jan Kiepura, Magda Schneider	Musical	German/Austrian co-production
A City Upside Down	Gustaf Gründgens	S.Z. Sakall, Jenny Jugo, Hermann Thimig	Comedy	
A Door Opens	Alfred Zeisler	Hermann Speelmans, Fritz Odemar, Oskar Sima	Thriller	
Dream of the Rhine	Herbert Selpin	Käthe Haack, Hugo Fischer-Köppe, Peter Erkelenz	Comedy	
The Emperor's Waltz	Frederic Zelnik	Mártha Eggerth, Carl Esmond, Paul Hörbiger	Musical	
The Empress and I	Friedrich Hollaender	Lilian Harvey, Conrad Veidt, Mady Christians, Heinz Rühmann	Musical	
The Flower of Hawaii	Richard Oswald	Mártha Eggerth, Hans Fidesser, Iván Petrovich	Musical	
The Gentleman from Maxim's	Carl Boese	Lee Parry, Johannes Riemann, Oskar Karlweis	Comedy	
Gently My Songs Entreat	Willi Forst	Marta Eggerth, Luise Ullrich, Hans Jaray	Musical	Co-production with Austria
Girls of Today	Herbert Selpin	Viktor de Kowa, Annie Markart, Oscar Sabo	Comedy	
Greetings and Kisses, Veronika	Carl Boese	Franciska Gaal, Paul Hörbiger, Otto Wallburg	Comedy	
Gretel Wins First Prize	Carl Boese	Lucie Englisch, Leopold von Ledebur, Jakob Tiedtke	Comedy	
Hans Westmar	Franz Wenzler	Emil Lohkamp, Paul Wegener, Heinrich Heilinger	Propaganda film	
Happy Days in Aranjuez	Johannes Meyer	Brigitte Helm, Gustaf Gründgens, Wolfgang Liebeneiner	Comedy	
Her Highness the Saleswoman	Karl Hartl	Liane Haid, Willi Forst, Paul Kemp	Comedy	
Hitler Youth Quex	Hans Steinhoff	Berta Drews, Heinrich George, Jürgen Ohlsen	Drama	Propaganda film
Homecoming to Happiness	Carl Boese	Luise Ullrich, Paul Hörbiger, Heinz Rühmann	Comedy	
The House of Dora Green	Henrik Galeen	Mady Christians, Paul Hartmann, Alfred Abel	Thriller	
The Hymn of Leuthen	Carl Froelich, Arzén von Cserépy	Otto Gebühr, Olga Chekhova, Elga Brink	Historical	
The Hunter from Kurpfalz	Carl Behr	Hans Adalbert Schlettow, Fritz Kampers, Walter Rilla	Comedy	
Inge and the Millions	Erich Engel	Brigitte Helm, Carl Esmond, Paul Wegener	Comedy	
Invisible Opponent	Rudolph Cartier	Gerda Maurus, Paul Hartmann, Oskar Homolka	Drama	Co-production with Austria
The Judas of Tyrol	Franz Osten	Fritz Rasp, Camilla Spira, Marianne Hoppe	Historical	
Jumping Into the Abyss	Harry Piel	Harry Piel, Elga Brink, Anton Pointner	Crime	

== L–Z ==
Title	Director	Cast	Genre	Notes
The Lake Calls	Hans Hinrich	Heinrich George, Erika Helmke, Hans Mierendorff	Drama	
Laughing Heirs	Max Ophüls	Heinz Rühmann, Max Adalbert, Ida Wüst	Romance, comedy	
Liebelei	Max Ophüls	Paul Hörbiger, Magda Schneider, Wolfgang Liebeneiner	Drama	
The Little Crook	Johannes Meyer	Ursula Deinert, Walter Steinbeck, Elisabeth Wendt	Comedy	
Little Girl, Great Fortune	E.W. Emo	Dolly Haas, Carl Esmond, Adele Sandrock	Comedy	
Little Man, What Now?	Fritz Wendhausen	Hermann Thimig, Viktor de Kowa, Hertha Thiele	Drama	
The Love Hotel	Carl Lamac	Anny Ondra, Mathias Wieman, Peter Voß	Comedy	
Love Must Be Understood	Hans Steinhoff	Rosy Barsony, Wolf Albach-Retty, Käthe Haack	Musical comedy	
Manolescu, Prince of Thieves	Georg C. Klaren, Willi Wolff	Iván Petrovich, Ellen Richter, Mady Christians	Crime comedy	
The Marathon Runner	Ewald André Dupont	Brigitte Helm, Hans Brausewetter, Viktor de Kowa	Sports	
Marion, That's Not Nice	E.W. Emo	Magda Schneider, Hermann Thimig, Otto Wallburg	Comedy	
The Master Detective	Franz Seitz	Ery Bos, Hans Stüwe, Weiss Ferdl	Comedy	
Morgenrot	Gustav Ucicky	Rudolf Forster, Adele Sandrock, Fritz Genschow	War	
Must We Get Divorced?	Hans Behrendt	Else Elster, Aribert Mog, Iván Petrovich	Comedy	
No Day Without You	Hans Behrendt	Lee Parry, Oskar Karlweis, Paul Hörbiger	Comedy	
The Only Girl	Friedrich Hollaender	Lilian Harvey, Charles Boyer, Mady Christians	Musical	British-German co-production
The Page from the Dalmasse Hotel	Victor Janson	Dolly Haas, Harry Liedtke, Hans Junkermann	Comedy	
The Peak Scaler	Franz Wenzler	Theodor Loos, Paul Rehkopf, Theo Lingen	Drama	
Refugees	Gustav Ucicky	Hans Albers, Käthe von Nagy, Eugen Klöpfer	Drama	
Ripening Youth	Carl Froelich	Heinrich George, Hertha Thiele, Marieluise Claudius	Drama	
The Roberts Case	Erich Engels	Hermann Speelmans, Camilla Spira, Eduard von Winterstein	Drama	
S.A.-Mann Brand	Franz Seitz	Otto Wernicke, Elise Aulinger, Joe Stöckel	Propaganda film	
The Sandwich Girl	Carl Boese	Lucie Englisch, Jakob Tiedtke, Else Reval	Comedy	
Scandal in Budapest	Steve Sekely, Géza von Bolváry	Franciska Gaal, Werner Pledath , Werner Pledath	Comedy	
Season in Cairo	Reinhold Schünzel	Renate Müller, Willy Fritsch, Gustav Waldau	Musical	
S.O.S. Iceberg	Arnold Fanck	Gustav Diessl, Leni Riefenstahl, Sepp Rist	Adventure	
A Song Goes Round the World	Richard Oswald	Joseph Schmidt, Viktor de Kowa, Charlotte Ander	Drama	
A Song for You	Joe May	Jan Kiepura, Jenny Jugo, Paul Kemp	Musical	
Song of the Black Mountains	Hans Natge	Ita Rina, Blandine Ebinger, Ernst Dumcke	Drama	Co-production with Yugoslavia
Spies at Work	Gerhard Lamprecht	Karl Ludwig Diehl, Brigitte Helm, Eduard von Winterstein	Thriller	
The Star of Valencia	Alfred Zeisler	Liane Haid, Ossi Oswalda, Peter Erkelenz	Drama	
The Sun Rises	Willy Reiber	Fritz Kampers, Rudolf Platte, Jakob Tiedtke	Musical	
Tell Me Who You Are	Georg Jacoby	Liane Haid, Viktor de Kowa, Olly Gebauer	Comedy	
The Testament of Dr. Mabuse	Fritz Lang	Oscar Beregi, Sr., Rudolf Klein-Rogge, Theodor Loos	Crime	
There Is Only One Love	Johannes Meyer	Louis Graveure, Heinz Rühmann, Jenny Jugo	Musical	
A Thousand for One Night	Max Mack	Claire Rommer, Trude Berliner, Harald Paulsen	Comedy	Co-production with Czechoslovakia
Three Bluejackets and a Blonde	Carl Boese	Charlotte Ander, Heinz Rühmann, Fritz Kampers	Comedy	
Today Is the Day	Kurt Gerron	Hans Albers, Luise Rainer, Oskar Karlweis	Comedy	
The Tsarevich	Victor Janson	Mártha Eggerth, Hans Söhnker, Ida Wüst	Musical	
The Tunnel	Curtis Bernhardt	Paul Hartmann, Attila Hörbiger, Gustaf Gründgens	Comedy-drama	French-German co-production
Two Good Comrades	Max Obal	Paul Hörbiger, Fritz Kampers, Margot Walter	Comedy	
Typhoon	Robert Wiene	Liane Haid, Viktor de Kowa, Valéry Inkijinoff	Drama	
Victor and Victoria	Reinhold Schünzel	Renate Müller, Hermann Thimig, Adolf Wohlbrück	Comedy	
Ways to a Good Marriage	Adolf Trotz	Olga Chekhova, Alfred Abel, Hilde Hildebrand	Drama	
Wedding at Lake Wolfgang	Hans Behrendt	Hugo Schrader, Gustl Gstettenbaur, Hansi Niese	Musical	
When the Village Music Plays on Sunday Nights	Charles Klein	Harry Liedtke, Maria Paudler, Jakob Tiedtke	Comedy	
What Men Know	Gerhard Lamprecht	Hans Brausewetter, Erwin Kalser, Toni van Eyck	Drama	
What Women Dream	Géza von Bolváry	Nora Gregor, Gustav Fröhlich, Otto Wallburg	Comedy mystery	
A Woman Like You	Carl Boese	Liane Haid, Georg Alexander, S.Z. Sakall	Comedy	
Young Dessau's Great Love	Arthur Robison	Willy Fritsch, Trude Marlen, Paul Hörbiger	Historical	

== Documentaries ==
Title	Director	Cast	Genre	Notes
Ausländischer Besuch im neuen Deutschland			documentary	
Blutendes Deutschland	Johannes Häussler		documentary	
Der Deutsche Reichstag zu Nürnberg			Documentary	On Internet Archive
Deutschland erwacht - Ein Dokument von der Wiedergeburt Deutschlands			Documentary	
Deutschland zwischen gestern und heute			Documentary	
Hakenkreuz am Stahlhelm	Hubert Schonger		documentary	Merger of Der Stahlhelm with the Nazi party; Available online here
Das Rauhes Haus in Hamburg. 100 Jahre evangelische Erziehungsarbeit	Gertrud David		Documentary	About the Rauhes Haus
Ringende Menschen. Die Tragödie einer Familie	Gertrud David		Documentary	
Der Tag von Potsdam. 21. März 1933			documentary propaganda	Available online here
Terror oder Aufbau			documentary propaganda	
The Victory of Faith	Leni Riefenstahl		Propaganda	

== Shorts ==
Title	Director	Cast	Genre	Notes
Alle machen mit	Franz Wenzler	Heinz Rühmann, Henny Porten, Magda Schneider		Short film
Blut und Boden - Grundlagen zum neuen Reich	Walter Ruttmann	Carl de Vogt	Partially animated propaganda	Presents Nazi agricultural policy
Arbeitslos. Ein Schicksal von Millionen	Willy Zielke			
Architekturkongress	László Moholy-Nagy			
Aus Deutschlands Bronzezeit	Walter Fischer			
Aus der Heimat des Elchs. Tierbilder aus den finnischen Wäldern	Ulrich K.T. Schultz			
Carmen	Lotte Reiniger		Animation	
Hilfe, ein Löwe	Alexander von Gontscharoff		Animation	
Hitlers Aufruf an das deutsche Volk				Hitlers Feb. 10, 1933 Sportpalast speech;
Insel der Damonen	Baron Victor von Plessen			
Kreise	Oskar Fischinger		Animation	
Metall	Hans Richter			
Nördlingen, Anno 1634				documentary, short
Die Strasse frei den braunen Bataillonen	Walter Fischer			
Studie Nr. 13	Oskar Fischinger		Animation	
Studie Nr. 14	Oskar Fischinger		Animation	
Das rollende Rad	Lotte Reiniger		Animation	
Schall und Rauch	Hans Fischerkoesen		Animation	
Der Tag der nationalen Arbeit - 1 Mai 1933				Clip available online here
Eine viertelstunde Großstadtstatistik	Oskar Fischinger		Animation	
Wolkenkratzer in Südarabien	Hans Helfritz, Martin Rikli	Martin Jacob		
Zwei Farben	Wolfgang Kaskeline		Animation	
