= Hermine and the Seven Upright Men =

1935 film directed by Frank Wisbar

- Directed by: Frank Wisbar
- Starring: Heinrich George; Karin Hardt
- Release date: 11 January 1935
- Running time: 1h 46min
- Country: Germany
- Language: German

Hermine and the Seven Upright Men (German: Hermine und die sieben Aufrechten) is a 1935 German drama film based on the novella Das Fähnlein der sieben Aufrechten by Gottfried Keller.

== Cast ==
- Heinrich George - Zimmermeister Frymann
- Karin Hardt - Hermine, seine Tochter
- Paul Henckels - Schneidermeister Hediger
- Lotte Spira - Mrs. Hediger, seine Frau
- Albert Lieven - Karl, deren Sohn
- Karel Štěpánek - Ruckstuhl, Grundstückspekulant
- Hans Henninger - Spörri
- Friedrich Ettel - Gastwirt Aklin
- Maria Krahn - Mrs. Aklin, seine Frau
- Max Holzboer - Schmied Syfrig
- Annemarie Steinsieck - Mrs. Syfrig, seine Frau
- Alfred Schlageter - Tischlermeister Bürgi
- Käthe Haack - Mrs. Bürgi, seine Frau
- Armin Schweizer - Silberschmied Kurser

== Accolades ==
Award	Date of ceremony	Category	Recipient(s)	Result	Ref.
Venice Film Festival	1 September 1935	Special Mention	Hermine and the Seven Upright Men	Won	

== Works cited ==
- Waldman, Harry (2008). Nazi Films In America, 1933-1942. McFarland & Company. ISBN 9780786438617.
