= Financial Opportunists =

1934 film

- Directed by: Fritz Kampers
- Written by: Curt J. Braun; Bobby E. Lüthge
- Produced by: Felix Pfitzner
- Starring: Weiss Ferdl; Sabine Peters; Hans Adalbert Schlettow
- Cinematography: Herbert Körner
- Edited by: Oswald Hafenrichter
- Music by: Marc Roland
- Production company: Cicero Film
- Distributed by: Neue Deutsch Lichtspiel-Syndikat Verleih
- Release date: 26 January 1934
- Running time: 84 minutes
- Country: Germany
- Language: German

Financial Opportunists (German: Konjunkturritter) is a 1934 German comedy film directed by Fritz Kampers and starring Weiss Ferdl, Sabine Peters and Hans Adalbert Schlettow. The film's sets were designed by the art directors Gustav A. Knauer and Alexander Mügge. The title was a well-known phrase to attack Jews, and was one of the first openly antisemitic films produced under the Nazi regime.

== Cast ==
- Weiss Ferdl as Ferdinand Mühlbauer
- Sabine Peters as Gretl, seine Tochter
- Hans Adalbert Schlettow as Dr. Lehmann, Rechtsanwalt
- Otto Wallburg as Untermeier, Grundstücksspekulant
- Kurt Vespermann as Dr. Günther, Rechtsanwalt
- Theo Lingen as Glaser, Grundstücksspekulant
- Walter Steinbeck as Direktor Messerschmidt
- Eugen Rex as Büngermann
- Käthe Haack as Frau Hornstedt
- Hans Leibelt as Klagemann, beider Hauptgläubiger
- Charly Berger as Ober

== Bibliography ==
- Niven, Bill. Hitler and Film: The Führer's Hidden Passion. Yale University Press, 2018.
- Waldman, Harry. Nazi Films in America, 1933–1942. McFarland, 2008.
