= The Convict from Istanbul =

1929 film

- Lotte Lorring and Willi Forst
- Directed by: Gustav Ucicky
- Written by: {{ubl[Fedor von Zobeltitz (novel)|Karl Hartl|Robert Liebmann|Franz Schulz}}
- Produced by: Günther Stapenhorst
- Starring: Heinrich George; Betty Amann; Paul Hörbiger; Willi Forst
- Cinematography: Karl Hasselmann
- Production company: UFA
- Distributed by: UFA
- Release date: 30 August 1929
- Country: Germany
- Languages: Silent; German intertitles

The Convict from Istanbul (German: Der Sträfling aus Stambul) is a 1929 German silent drama film directed by Gustav Ucicky and starring Heinrich George, Betty Amann, and Paul Hörbiger. It was shot at the Babelsberg Studios in Berlin. The film's art direction is by Heinz Fenchel and Jacek Rotmil.

== Cast ==
- Heinrich George as Thomas Zezi
- Betty Amann as Hilde Wollwarth
- Paul Hörbiger as Vlastos
- Willi Forst as Manopulos
- Trude Hesterberg as Jola Zezi
- Lotte Lorring as Dolly
- Frida Richard as Zimmerwirtin
- Paul Rehkopf as Winkeladvokat
- Erich Moeller as Polizist
- Leo Peukert
- Arthur Wellin

== Bibliography ==
- Prawer, S.S. Between Two Worlds: The Jewish Presence in German and Austrian Film, 1910-1933. Berghahn Books, 2005.
