= The Little Crook =

1933 film

- Directed by: Johannes Meyer
- Written by: Curt J. Braun; Fritz Falkenstein; Georg C. Klaren
- Produced by: Felix Pfitzner; Ilja Salkind
- Starring: Ursula Deinert; Walter Steinbeck; Elisabeth Wendt
- Cinematography: Carl Drews
- Edited by: Hanne Kuyt
- Music by: Franz Doelle
- Production company: T.K. Tonfilm-Produktion
- Distributed by: Paramount Pictures
- Release date: 3 April 1933
- Running time: 76 minutes
- Country: Germany
- Language: German

The Little Crook (German: Die kleine Schwindlerin) is a 1933 German comedy film directed by Johannes Meyer and starring Dolly Haas, Harald Paulsen and Betty Amann. It was shot at the Halensee Studios in Berlin and on location around Nice. The film's sets were designed by the art director Otto Erdmann and Hans Sohnle. The film was produced during the Weimar Republic but released following the Nazi takeover and was distributed by the German subsidiary of Paramount Pictures.

== Cast ==
- Dolly Haas as Annette
- Harald Paulsen as Lord Bob E. Denver, gen. "Bob"
- Betty Amann as Gwendoline
- Otto Wallburg as Der Bräutigam
- Alfred Abel as Der Vater
- Olga Limburg as Die Gräfin
- Theo Lingen as Der Sohn
- Hans Junkermann as Onkel Jeremias
- Hansi Arnstaedt as Mabel
- Julia Serda as Lady Viktoria
- Hans Deppe as Ein Taschendieb
- Paul Biensfeldt as Baptiste

== Bibliography ==
- Klaus, Ulrich J. Deutsche Tonfilme: Jahrgang 1933. Klaus-Archiv, 1988.
- Waldman, Harry. Nazi Films in America, 1933-1942. McFarland, 2008.
