= Oh Those Glorious Old Student Days (1930 film) =

1930 film

- Directed by: Rolf Randolf
- Written by: Georg C. Klaren
- Produced by: Liddy Hegewald
- Starring: Werner Fuetterer; Fritz Alberti; Betty Amann
- Cinematography: Carl Drews
- Music by: Rolf Marbot; Werner Schmidt-Boelcke
- Production company: Hegewald Film
- Distributed by: Silva-Film
- Release date: 30 September 1930
- Running time: 85 minutes
- Country: Germany
- Language: German

Oh Those Glorious Old Student Days (German: O alte Burschenherrlichkeit) is a 1930 German comedy film directed by Rolf Randolf and starring Werner Fuetterer, Fritz Alberti and Betty Amann. It is one of a number of films in the nostalgic Old Heidelberg tradition.

The film's sets were designed by the art director Erich Zander. It was shot on location in Heidelberg in the Rhineland.

== Cast ==
- Werner Fuetterer as Student Robert Riedel
- Fritz Alberti as Herr Schwab
- Betty Amann as Norma, dessen Tochter
- Erwin van Roy as Balther
- Alfred Beierle as Methusalem
- Betty Astor as Mieze
- Anna Müller-Lincke as Frau Laubinger, die Wirtin
- Gretl Theimer

== Bibliography ==
- Jelavich, Peter (2006). Berlin Alexanderplatz: Radio, Film, and the Death of Weimar Culture. University of California Press. ISBN 978-0-520-93164-0.
