= Wrath of the Seas =

1926 German silent film

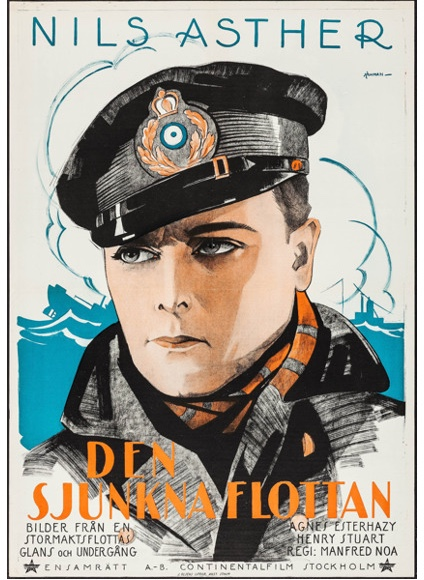
- Swedish theatrical release poster
- Directed by: Graham Hewett; Manfred Noa
- Written by: Margarete-Maria Langen; Willy Rath
- Produced by: Lothar Stark
- Starring: Bernhard Goetzke; Agnes Esterhazy; Nils Asther; Hans Albers
- Cinematography: Otto Kanturek; Bruno Timm
- Music by: Felix Bartsch
- Production company: Lothar Stark-Film
- Release date: December 1926
- Running time: 97 minutes
- Country: Germany
- Languages: Silent; German intertitles

Wrath of the Seas or When Fleet Meets Fleet (German: Die versunkene Flotte) is a silent war film released in 1926. Directed by Graham Hewett and Manfred Noa and starring Bernhard Goetzke, Agnes Esterhazy and Nils Asther. It portrays the Imperial German Navy during the First World War, particularly the Battle of Jutland and is based on a novel written by Helmut Lorenz.

== Cast ==
- Bernhard Goetzke as Korvettenkapitän Barnow
- Agnes Esterhazy as Erika Barnow
- Nils Asther as Torpedooffizier Günther Adenried

and in alphabetical order

- Hans Albers as Oberheizer Tim Kreuger
- Bobbie Bender as Fähnrich
- Henry Bender as Röwers Kompanion
- Eugen Burg as Wilhelm H. Elsberg
- Heinrich George as Obermaat Röwer
- Käthe Haack as Anna Sass, "Wirtin der Weltkugel"
- Dary Holm as Hilde Elsberg
- Hans Mierendorff as Kapitän des "Großherzog"
- Werner Pittschau as Kapititänleutnant Fritz Kämpf
- Camilla Spira
- Henry Stuart as Commander Norton
- Otz Tollen

== Bibliography ==
- Bock, Hans-Michael & Bergfelder, Tim. The Concise CineGraph. Encyclopedia of German Cinema. Berghahn Books, 2009.
