= Alfred Beierle =

German actor (1885–1950)

- Born: 4 June 1885; Berlin, German Empire
- Died: 16 March 1950 (aged 64); West Berlin, West Germany
- Occupation: Actor
- Years active: 1918–1950 (film)

Alfred Beierle (4 June 1885 – 16 March 1950) was a German stage and film actor.

== Selected filmography ==
- The League of Three (1929)
- The Flute Concert of Sanssouci (1930)
- The Shot in the Sound Film Studio (1930)
- The Tiger Murder Case (1930)
- Oh Those Glorious Old Student Days (1930)
- The Duke of Reichstadt (1931)
- My Leopold (1931)
- Bobby Gets Going (1931)
- Cadets (1931)
- In the Employ of the Secret Service (1931)
- Gloria (1931)
- Crime Reporter Holm (1932)
- The Daredevil (1931)
- Express 13 (1931)
- The Captain from Köpenick (1931)
- The Stranger (1931)
- Gypsies of the Night (1932)
- The Heath Is Green (1932)
- Man Without a Name (1932)
- The Victor (1932)
- The White Demon (1932)
- The Big Bluff (1933)
- The Burning Secret (1933)
- Life Begins Tomorrow (1933)
- The Flower Girl from the Grand Hotel (1934)
- A Woman with Power of Attorney (1934)
- The Violet of Potsdamer Platz (1936)
- Under Blazing Heavens (1936)

== Bibliography ==
- Alpi, Deborah Lazaroff. Robert Siodmak: A Biography, with Critical Analyses of His Films Noirs and a Filmography of All His Works. McFarland, 1998.
