= Carl Drews =

German cinematographer

Carl Drews (27 January 1894 – 3 September 1983 ) was a German cinematographer.

== Selected filmography ==
- The Last Kolczaks (1920)
- Roswolsky's Mistress (1921)
- The Secret of the Mummy (1921)
- The Eternal Struggle (1921)
- Lucrezia Borgia (1922)
- The Game with Women (1922)
- Tatjana (1923)
- The Third Watch (1924)
- Chronicles of the Gray House (1925)
- The Farmer from Texas (1925)
- The Schimeck Family (1926)
- The Divorcée (1926)
- Vienna, How it Cries and Laughs (1926)
- Derby (1926)
- The Ones Down There (1926)
- Sword and Shield (1926)
- The House of Lies (1926)
- Prinz Louis Ferdinand (1927)
- The Indiscreet Woman (1927)
- The Girl from Abroad (1927)
- The Queen of Spades (1927)
- The Trousers (1927)
- Ariadne in Hoppegarten (1928)
- Yacht of the Seven Sins (1928)
- The Lady with the Mask (1928)
- The Merry Widower (1929)
- Her Dark Secret (1929)
- The Hero of Every Girl's Dream (1929)
- Oh Those Glorious Old Student Days (1930)
- The Love Express (1931)
- Alarm at Midnight (1931)
- Marriage with Limited Liability (1931)
- Johann Strauss (1931)
- Trenck (1932)
- Chauffeur Antoinette (1932)
- The Ladies Diplomat (1932)
- Viennese Waltz (1932)
- The Mad Bomberg (1932)
- Dream of the Rhine (1933)
- The Little Crook (1933)
- Girls of Today (1933)
- The Gentleman from Maxim's (1933)
- The Big Bluff (1933)
- Adventure on the Southern Express (1934)
- The Voice of Love (1934)
- Heinz in the Moon (1934)
- Such a Rascal (1934)
- A Girl Whirls By the World (1934)
- Love and the First Railway (1934)
- The Last Waltz (1934)
- Charley's Aunt (1934)
- Marriage Strike (1935)
- Punks Arrives from America (1935)
- Pillars of Society (1935)
- Doctor Engel (1936)
- The Last Waltz (1936)
- All Lies (1938)
- Bachelor's Paradise (1939)
- Police Report (1939)
- Wunschkonzert (1940)
