= The Jumping Jack (1930 film) =

1930 film

- Directed by: E.W. Emo
- Written by: Gustav Beer; Fritz Lunzer; Hans H. Zerlett
- Produced by: Curt Melnitz
- Starring: Max Hansen; S.Z. Sakall; Lien Deyers
- Cinematography: Friedl Behn-Grund; Curt Courant
- Music by: Robert Stolz
- Production company: Terra Film
- Distributed by: Terra Film
- Release date: 25 November 1930
- Running time: 73 minutes
- Country: Germany
- Language: German

The Jumping Jack (German: Der Hampelmann) is a 1930 German comedy film directed by E.W. Emo and starring Max Hansen, S.Z. Sakall and Lien Deyers. The film was shot at the Marienfelde Studios of Terra Film in Berlin. The film's sets were designed by the art director Heinrich Richter. It premiered at the Marmorhaus in Berlin.

== Cast ==
- Max Hansen as Baron Max von Storch
- S.Z. Sakall as Eickmeyer - Parfümfabrikant
- Lien Deyers as Lissy - seine Frau
- Paul Heidemann as Werner Frank - Abteilungschef
- Otto Wallburg as Clamotte, Direktor des Warenhauses
- Lotte Werkmeister as Anny - Zofe
- Oscar Sabo as Diener
- Hugo Fischer-Köppe
- Ernst Behmer
- Ernst Morgan
- Celia Lovsky
- Wolfgang von Schwindt

== Bibliography ==
- Bock, Hans-Michael & Bergfelder, Tim. The Concise CineGraph. Encyclopedia of German Cinema. Berghahn Books, 2009.
- Klaus, Ulrich J. Deutsche Tonfilme: Jahrgang 1930. Klaus-Archiv, 1988.
