= Tugboat M 17 =

- Directed by: Heinrich George; Werner Hochbaum
- Written by: Willy Döll
- Starring: Heinrich George; Berta Drews; Betty Amann
- Cinematography: A.O. Weitzenberg
- Edited by: Ella Stein
- Music by: Will Meisel; Alex Stone
- Production company: Orbis-Film
- Release date: 19 April 1933
- Running time: 78 minutes
- Country: Germany
- Language: German

Tugboat M 17 (German: Schleppzug M 17) is a 1933 German drama film directed by Heinrich George and Werner Hochbaum and starring Heinrich George, Berta Drews and Betty Amann. George, a prominent actor, directed much of the film before it was finished by Hochbaum. Location filming took place on the Ruppiner See. It portrays life on a boat on Germany's inland waterways in the vicinity of Berlin.

It premiered at the Ufa-Palast am Zoo on 19 April 1933.

== Cast ==
- Heinrich George as Henner, der Schiffer
- Berta Drews as Marie, seine Frau
- Joachim Streubel as Franz, sein Kind
- Betty Amann as Gescha
- Wilfried Seyferth as Jakob
- Maria Schanda as Eine Sängerin
- Robert Müller as Jakobs Vater
- Kurt Getke as Piet
- Friedrich Ettel as Orje
- Hansjoachim Büttner as Karl
- Walter Steiner as Ein Kommerzienrat
- Alexander Jonas as Ein Wirt

== Bibliography ==
- Bock, Hans-Michael & Bergfelder, Tim. The Concise Cinegraph: Encyclopaedia of German Cinema. Berghahn Books, 2009.
