= Isle of Forgotten Sins =

1943 American adventure film by Edgar George Ulmer

- Original lobby card
- Directed by: Edgar G. Ulmer
- Screenplay by: Raymond L. Schrock
- Based on: original story by Edgar G. Ulmer
- Produced by: Leon Fromkess (in charge of production); Peter R. Van Duinen (producer)
- Starring: John Carradine; Gale Sondergaard
- Cinematography: Ira Morgan, A.S.C.
- Edited by: Charles Henkel Jr.
- Music by: Erdody
- Production company: Atlantis Pictures Corporation
- Distributed by: PRC
- Release date: August 15, 1943
- Running time: 82 min/74 min.
- Country: United States
- Language: English

Isle of Forgotten Sins is an American South Seas adventure film released on August 15, 1943 by PRC, with Leon Fromkess in charge of production, directed by Edgar G. Ulmer (also credited with original story) and featuring top-billed John Carradine and Gale Sondergaard, whose performance in one of 1936's Academy Award for Best Picture nominees, Anthony Adverse, earned her the first Academy Award for Best Supporting Actress.

Isle of Forgotten Sins was subsequently reissued in a version cut from 82 to 74 minutes and retitled Monsoon. It proved to be the final film role for German-American actress Betty Amann as well as the last feature for producer Peter R. Van Duinen's Atlantis Pictures, a unit whose films had a higher budget then most of PRC's releases. Third-listed supporting actor Sidney Toler worked on this PRC title between the finish of his Charlie Chan films at 20th Century Fox and just before their resumption at Monogram Pictures. The film features several songs (with Carradine singing "Whiskey Johnny"), an underwater sequence using a marionette and a tropical monsoon climax. The pre-release working title was Island of Forgotten Sins.

== Plot ==
Marge is the proprietress of "Isle of Forgotten Sins", a South Sea Island gambling hall/brothel. Its hostesses are Olga, Bobbie, Mimi, and Christine.

On a boat moored in the harbor, deep sea diver Mike Clancy awakens from drunken sleep to find that his diving partner Jack Burke has tied him to the bunk bed. Clancy offers to pay for drinks if Burke unties him. However, Burke wants to see the cash first. Clancy says that the money is in his pocket, so Burke reaches in, takes all of it, and leaves without untying him.

Burke goes to Marge's place and tries to woo Marge, who is in love with Clancy. Clancy eventually arrives and, enraged by Burke's treachery, beats him unconscious in a fistfight. After Burke comes to, Clancy says that he has recognized two guests in the room as Krogan and Johnny Pacific, the captain and purser of the steamship Tropic Star which, six months earlier, disappeared in the Coral Sea with three million dollars in gold. Clancy says that they must have hidden the loot. After he and Burke leave Marge's place, a scream is heard from upstairs, then a shot, and a customer staggers and falls from the upper landing, dead. Olga runs from the scene with a gun in her hand. Seeking to disappear before police arrive, Krogan, Johnny and the diners rush for the exits. Marge and her girls head for Burke's boat.

Clancy tells the women of his and Burke's plan as the boat sets off for Marana island, where Krogan and Johnny run a plantation. The arrival is noted through binoculars by Krogan, who predicted Burke and Clancy would try to steal the gold. Burke, Clancy and the women arrive at Krogan's house. Marge says that they are running away from the authorities and convinces Krogan to give them asylum for a few days.

As the women, Krogan and Johnny go for a night swim, Clancy and Burke search the house. They find the Tropic Star log, with a map that indicates that the gold is still underwater on the ship, waiting to be salvaged. In fact, the map has been placed there for Burke and Clancy to find; Krogan's plan is to lure them into doing the hazardous work of recovering the gold which he will then seize for himself.

The next morning, Clancy and Burke take turns descending in diving suits. On the island, Krogan and Johnny secretly watch as the trunk full of bullion is raised. Burke claims 60 percent of the loot because he provided the boat and the crew. Clancy protests and they start fighting while Krogan, Johnny and their men board the boat. Krogan draws a gun and orders Clancy and Burke into the boat's back room; Johnny nails the door shut. As they board their launch, Krogan and Johnny light a fuse to explosives which they attached to Burke's boat. Before the boat explodes, Clancy and Burke escape.

As a storm rages, Krogan, Johnny and the five natives return to the island. Marge asks what happened to Clancy; Krogan answers that he died. No longer interested in sharing the loot with Johnny, Krogan accuses him of planning to double-cross him. Johnny pulls out his gun and they simultaneously shoot each other dead. Clancy then enters with Burke, happy that they will all get the money. Storm winds hit the thatched house, which is then washed away by the surging waves.

At "The Bird Cage Cafe", Marge is later seated at the cash register, with a framed photograph of Diane and Burke as a happy couple, propped up against it, while Clancy, wearing a captain's cap and jacket, sits by her and says, "I'll have to put the bite on you for about fifty dollars", explaining that he will tell her more later, adding, "you haven't forgotten about that bungalow on the Riviera, have you?" She gives him the money and rings up "NO SALE".

== Cast ==
- John Carradine ... Clancy
- Gale Sondergaard ... Marge
- Sidney Toler ... Krogan
- Frank Fenton ... Burke
- Veda Ann Borg ... Luana
- Rita Quigley ... Diane
- Rick Vallin ... Johnny Pacific
- Tala Birell ... Christine
- Patti McCarty ... Bobbie
- Betty Amann ... Olga
- Marian Colby ... Mimi
- William Edmonds ... Chief

== Soundtrack ==
Ulmer's contract with PRC made him the only producer to be able to commission music rather than use stock cues. Composer Leo Erdody, a long time friend of Ulmer included several Wagnerian themes and songs.

== Production ==
The film was shot at Corriganville movie ranch in six days at a cost of $23,000. Ulmer, who was a production assistant on F. W. Murnau's Tabu: A Story of the South Seas found 200 miniature trees from John Ford's 1937 film The Hurricane and wrote a South Seas story based on ideas he had while filming Tabu. Ulmer, "The Frank Capra of PRC". also reused footage from PRC's Jungle Siren. The Production Code Administration insisted that the nightclub hostesses of the film in no way could resemble prostitutes. The original ending depicting the self-sacrificing watery suicide of Clancy and Marge to save Diane was ordered changed.

== Evaluation in film guides ==
Leonard Maltin's Movie Guide (2001 edition) gives Isle of Forgotten Sins 2 stars (out of 4) calling it a "standard programmer", but concludes that "as usual, Ulmer's direction is much better than the material".

Also assigning 2 stars (out of 5), The Motion Picture Guide (1987 edition) describes it as "a jumpy and only partly engaging picture that seems to have been rearranged thanks to the Hays Code, this film had one of the best casts ever put together by poverty-row PRC", and the specialized 1996 compendium, Michael J. Weldon's Psychotronic Video Guide, has a brief two-sentence write-up which mentions the plot and cast, along with notation that "Carradine starred in Ulmer's better-known Bluebeard, also from PRC".

Videohound's Golden Movie Retriever (2011 edition) agrees with the other guides in its 2 bones (out of 4) rating, deciding that it has "good cast and direction but unremarkable material", while among the British volumes, Halliwell's Film, Video & DVD Guide (2007 edition) provides no star rating (Halliwell's highest rating is 4 stars), describing it as a "patchy tropical melodrama with a cast more interesting than the script".

== Critical reappraisal ==
Michael E. Grost in The Films of Edgar G. Ulmer]: examines Isle of Forgotten Sins for traits which are frequently perceived within other films directed by Ulmer, with comparisons found in The Man from Planet X (1951), Detour and Strange Illusion (both 1945), The Amazing Transparent Man (1960), Tomorrow We Live (1942), as well as My Son, the Hero and Jive Junction (both 1943). Sections focusing on themes in Isle of Forgotten Sins common to Ulmer's work are highlighted by sub-headers: "Technical, Constructivist Worlds", "Telling the Story with Light", "Weather", "The Night Club", "Modular Architecture", "Figurines", "Tilted Camera Angle", "Characters", "The Finale" and "Uniforms."

In The Invisible Hand in Popular Culture: Liberty vs. Authority in American Film and TV, Paul Cantor writes about Isle of Forgotten Sins apropos his discussion of the use of classical music in Ulmer's Black Cat, referring readers to Andrew Repasky McElhinney's essay, “A World Destroyed By Gold: Shared Allegories of Capital in Wagner’s Ring and Ulmer’s Isle of Forgotten Sins,” in The Films of Edgar G. Ulmer (ed. Bernd Herzogenrath, Scarecrow Press, 2009) for "detailed analysis" of Erdody's appropriation of Wagner.
