= A Girl Whirls By the World =

1934 film

- Directed by: Georg Jacoby
- Written by: Franz Rauch; Walter Wassermann
- Based on: Lenox wirbelt durch die Welt by Hans Holm
- Produced by: Karl Schulz; Robert Wuellner; Erich Schickler
- Starring: Magda Schneider; Harald Paulsen; Theo Lingen
- Cinematography: Carl Drews
- Music by: Walter Kiesow; Theodor Knobel
- Production companies: Schulz & Wuellner Filmfabrikation
- Distributed by: Terra Film
- Release date: 2 March 1934
- Running time: 80 minutes
- Country: Germany
- Language: German

A Girl Whirls By the World (German: Ein Mädel wirbelt durch die Welt) is a 1934 German musical comedy film directed by Georg Jacoby and starring Magda Schneider, Harald Paulsen and Theo Lingen. It was shot at the Tempelhof Studios in Berlin. The film's sets were designed by the art director Fritz Maurischat.

== Cast ==
- Magda Schneider as Leonore 'Lenox' Brehmer
- Harald Paulsen as Paul Martens
- Hugo Schrader as Peter Barke
- Theo Lingen as Hugo Kühlemann, Prokurist
- Jakob Tiedtke as Hermann Brehmer, Verleger
- Olga Limburg as Anna, seine Frau
- Fita Benkhoff as Fräulein Pape
- Hugo Fischer-Köppe as Der Ortsschulze
- Gustav Püttjer as Der Gemeindediener
- Hans Hermann Schaufuß as Der Inhaber eines Modegeschäftes

== Bibliography ==
- Klaus, Ulrich J. Deutsche Tonfilme: Jahrgang 1934. Klaus-Archiv, 1988.
- Rentschler, Eric. The Ministry of Illusion: Nazi Cinema and Its Afterlife. Harvard University Press, 1996.
- Kramer, Thomas & Siegrist, Dominik. Terra: ein Schweizer Filmkonzern im Dritten Reich. Chronos, 1991.
- Waldman, Harry. Nazi Films In America, 1933–1942. McFarland & Co, 2008.
