= Friedrich Ettel =

Swiss actor

Friedrich Ettel (8 June 1890 – 12 March 1941) was a Swiss film actor.

Ettel was born in Zurich and died at the age of 50 in Berlin, Germany.

== Selected filmography ==
- Ludwig II, King of Bavaria (1929)
- Two People (1930)
- Louise, Queen of Prussia (1931)
- The Other Side (1931)
- Panik in Chicago (1931)
- Queen of the Night (1931)
- Wibbel the Tailor (1931)
- The Trunks of Mr. O.F. (1931)
- Trenck (1932)
- Eight Girls in a Boat (1932)
- Haunted People (1932)
- Cavaliers of the Kurfürstendamm (1932)
- Tannenberg (1932)
- A Tremendously Rich Man (1932)
- Impossible Love (1932)
- Typhoon (1933)
- The Merry Heirs (1933)
- Tugboat M 17 (1933)
- There Is Only One Love (1933)
- Two Good Comrades (1933)
- Laughing Heirs (1933)
- Dream of the Rhine (1933)
- Wilhelm Tell (1934)
- The Four Musketeers (1934)
- Heinz in the Moon (1934)
- The Champion of Pontresina (1934)
- Black Fighter Johanna (1934)
- Bashful Felix (1934)
- The Valley of Love (1935)
- Hermine and the Seven Upright Men (1935)
- One Too Many on Board (1935)
- The Haunted Castle (1936)
- The Call of the Jungle (1936)
- Nights in Andalusia (1938)
- Northern Lights (1938)
- The Marriage Swindler (1938)
- Marionette (1939)
- Enemies (1940)
- The Three Codonas (1940)

== Bibliography ==
- Jung, Uli & Schatzberg, Walter. Beyond Caligari: The Films of Robert Wiene. Berghahn Books, 1999.
