= Doctor Engel =

1936 film

- Directed by: Johannes Riemann
- Written by: Johannes Riemann; Harald Röbbeling; S.S. von Varady
- Produced by: Robert Neppach
- Starring: Paul Hörbiger; Viktoria von Ballasko; Hans Leibelt
- Cinematography: Carl Drews
- Music by: Hans Sommer
- Production company: R.N. Filmproduktion
- Distributed by: Rota Film
- Release date: 30 December 1936
- Running time: 87 minutes
- Country: Germany
- Language: German

Doctor Engel (German: Kinderarzt Dr. Engel) is a 1936 German comedy drama film directed by Johannes Riemann and starring Paul Hörbiger, Viktoria von Ballasko and Hans Leibelt. It was shot at the Halensee Studios in Berlin. The film's sets were designed by the art director Erich Zander.

== Synopsis ==
Doctor Engel is a kindly paediatrician who takes an interest in the single mother Maria who works as a violinist in the café he frequently visits. When her son Hans falls unwell Engel helps her care for him, but the owner of the café Oskar Dillmann fires her out of jealousy. Despite his growing love for Maria, Engel is unable to confess his love for her. In desperation she accepts an offer from Dillman to marry her, but the shrewd Hans pretends to be seriously ill in order to bring them together.

== Cast ==
- Paul Hörbiger as Dr. Engel
- Viktoria von Ballasko as Maria Winkler
- Arthur Fritz Eugens as Hans, Marias Sohn
- Ilse Rose-Vollborn as Frau von Wild
- Hans Leibelt as Tierarzt Dr. Baumbusch
- Oskar Sima as Oskar Dillmann, Inhaber des Café Korso
- Ernst Legal as Josef Boelke
- Josefine Dora as Julie
- Walter Steinbeck as Direktor Naumann
- Clementia Egies as Schwester Anna
- Elisabeth Botz as Schwester Berta
- Joachim Horn as Peter
- Sigrid Tscheuschner as Die kleine 'Schwester'
- Christa Westemeyer as Töchterchen von Frau v. Wild
- Fitti Topp as Kind
- Babsi Schultz-Reckewell as Inge
- Horst Bonnet as Max
- Heinz Wesley as Paul
- Hilde Hildebrand as Mutter eines Kindes im Krankenhaus
- Eva Genschow as Krankenschwester
- Kurt Getke as Kellner im Café Korso
- Hermann Pfeiffer as Gast im Café Korso
- Louis Ralph as Stammgast im Café Korso
- Michael von Newlinsky as Stammgast im Café Korso

== Bibliography ==
- Benzenhöfer, Udo (ed.) Medizin im Spielfilm des Nationalsozialismus. Burgverlag, 1990.
- Klaus, Ulrich J. Deutsche Tonfilme: Jahrgang 1936. Klaus-Archiv, 1988.
