= Hans in Every Street =

1930 film directed by Carl Froelich

- Camilla Horn and Betty Amann
- Directed by: Carl Froelich
- Written by: Ludwig Wolff (novel Smarra); Rudolf Franck
- Produced by: Carl Froelich; P.J. de Venloo
- Starring: Hans Albers; Camilla Horn; Betty Amann
- Cinematography: Franz Planer
- Edited by: Walter Supper
- Music by: Erwin Bootz; Hanson Milde-Meissner
- Production company: Carl Froelich-Film
- Release date: 23 December 1930
- Running time: 100 minutes
- Country: Germany
- Language: German

Hans in Every Street (German: Hans in allen Gassen) is a 1930 German crime film directed by Carl Froelich and starring Hans Albers, Camilla Horn, and Betty Amann. A separate French-language version was also released.

The film's sets were designed by the art director Franz Schroedter.

== Cast ==
- Hans Albers as Hans Steindecker, Reporter
- Camilla Horn as Elisabeth, seine Braut
- Betty Amann as Nelly, die Andere
- Max Adalbert as Steindecker sen., Vater
- Toni Tetzlaff as Frau Steindecker, Mutter
- Gustav Diessl as Soranzo
- Paul Heidemann as Mann von der Zeitung
- Heinz Sarnow as Mann von der Zeitung
- Hermann Böttcher
- Collette Jell
- Erich Kober
- Max Wilmsen
- Heinz Wagner
- Otto Wallburg

== Bibliography ==
- Bock, Hans-Michael; Bergfelder, Tim, eds. (2009). The Concise Cinegraph: Encyclopaedia of German Cinema. New York: Berghahn Books. ISBN 978-1-57181-655-9.
