= Pillars of Society (1935 film) =

1935 film

- Directed by: Detlef Sierck
- Written by: Karl Peter Gillmann; Georg C. Klaren
- Based on: The Pillars of Society by Henrik Ibsen
- Produced by: Ernst Krüger; Fred Lyssa; Robert Neppach; Hans Herbert Ulrich
- Starring: Heinrich George; Maria Krahn; Albrecht Schoenhals
- Cinematography: Carl Drews
- Edited by: Friedel Buckow
- Music by: Franz R. Friedl
- Production company: UFA
- Distributed by: UFA
- Release date: 21 December 1935
- Running time: 85 minutes
- Country: Germany
- Language: German

Pillars of Society (German: Stützen der Gesellschaft) is a 1935 German drama film directed by Detlef Sierck (later known as Douglas Sirk) and starring Heinrich George, Maria Krahn and Albrecht Schoenhals. It is based on the eponymous play by Henrik Ibsen.

The film's sets were designed by the art directors Otto Guelstorff and Hans Minzloff. It was shot at the Babelsberg Studios in Berlin and on location in Hamburg and the Danish island of Bornholm.

== Synopsis ==
In America, at the turn of the twentieth century, Norwegian immigrant Johann Tonnessen is a successful farmer. A friend of his, who manages a circus, invites Johann to travel with the circus on their upcoming tour of Norway and return to the town Johann emigrated from twenty years before.

Meanwhile, in Johann's hometown in Norway, Consul Karsten Bernick is one of the wealthiest, most celebrated citizens. He rules the town and owns a shipyard, which he intends to hand down eventually to his beloved young son Olaf, who is obsessed with America and the Wild West. Consul Bernick's wife Betty is Johann's sister. The Bernicks also have a young woman living with them named Dina, an orphan they adopted as a child. Bernick treats Dina with kindness, but his wife treats her like a maid.

When the circus arrives in town, Dina and Olaf are thrilled and excited to meet Johann, but the rest of the town reacts coolly to him. It turns out they all believe Dina is Johann's illegitimate child, which Dina has been kept unaware of. As Dina and Johann get to know each other, an attraction grows. Dina hates the town, and Johann invites Dina to come to America with him to work on his farm and start a new life.

Consul Bernick visits Johann and admits that he has been telling the town Dina is Johann's illegitimate daughter, when she is actually Bernick's own illegitimate daughter. Bernick promises to tell Dina this, but before he has a chance, Betty scolds her for taking Olaf to the circus, where they both spent time with Johann. Betty thinks this is scandalous. Dina runs back to the circus, where she reveals to Johann that Bernick has also been telling the entire town for years that Johann embezzled a large sum of money from Bernick's company, before leaving for America twenty years before. Johann confronts Bernick about this additional lie. Bernick admits he felt the lie about the embezzlement was necessary to cover his own business failures and maintain his place in society until he could rebuild his fortune.

Meanwhile, Dina finally learns that Bernick is her father. Johann and Dina demand Bernick reveal the whole truth to the town, but Bernick begs for time. His new shipyard, on which he has bet his entire fortune, will be completed in two months. Bernick wants to protect his business empire, in order to hand it to his son. Johann and Dina agree to leave for two months, but promise to return. If Bernick has not told the town the truth by then, Johann threatens to reveal the whole truth himself.

Terrified of being revealed as a liar, Bernick arranges for the ship Johann and Dina plan to sail on to depart with repair work only partly completed, in the middle of a serious storm, hoping it will sink. However, Johann and Dina leave the ship at the last minute, due to the storm, and stay in the town. Meanwhile, young Olaf secretly stows away on the ship, desperate to see America with his uncle Johann and Dina, since he has been dreaming of it his whole life.

As the storm hits the town and the ship fires distress flares, Bernick and his wife discover Olaf has run away and is on the ship. Johann goes out in a boat with local fishermen to rescue people from the sinking ship and succeeds in saving Olaf. Meanwhile, Bernick nearly drowns attempting to crawl out onto the rocks in the storm to save Olaf. As Bernick lies dying, Johann reunites Olaf with his father. Bernick names Johann as his heir to run the company, then dies.

Some time later, Johann, Dina and Olaf launch the first new ship whose construction Johann has overseen, which they christen “Happy Future.”

== Appearance dates and deviating film titles ==
The film premiered in Berlin on 21 December 1935. It premiered in the US on November 6, 1936. The film was released in France under the title Les Piliers de la Société, in Italy under the title Le Colonne della Società and in Portugal under the title Pilares Sociedade.

== Production notes ==
Filming took place in September and October 1935. The filming locations were Potsdam, Hamburg and Bornholm (in Denmark). Hans Minzloff and Otto Gülstorff were responsible for the film construction. Fred Lyssa held the production and manufacturing line.

== Cast ==
- Heinrich George as Consul Karsten Bernick
- Maria Krahn as Betty Bernick
- Horst Teetzmann as Olaf Bernick
- Albrecht Schoenhals as Johann Tonnessen
- Suse Graf as Dina Dorf
- Oskar Sima as Krapp
- Hansjoachim Büttner as Hammer
- Karl Dannemann as Aune
- Walther Süssenguth as Urbini
- Paul Beckers as Hansen, circus clown
- Franz Weber as Vigeland
- S.O. Schoening as Sandstadt
- Maria Hofen as Frau Vigeland
- Toni Tetzlaff as Frau Sandstadt
- Gerti Ober as Thora Sandstadt
- Fritz Draeger as guest - uncredited
- Alfred Karen as guest - uncredited
- Gustav Püttjeras sailor - uncredited
- Franz Stein as citizen - uncredited
- Walter Steinweg as sailor - uncredited
- Eleonore Tappert as cashier - uncredited
- Lewis Brody as cowboy - uncredited

== Bibliography ==
- Eric Rentschler. German Film & Literature. Routledge, 2013.
