= The Lady with the Mask =

1928 film

- Directed by: Wilhelm Thiele
- Written by: Alexander Esway; Henrik Galeen
- Produced by: Alexander Esway; Hans von Wolzogen
- Starring: Max Gülstorff; Arlette Marchal; Vladimir Gajdarov
- Cinematography: Carl Drews
- Production company: UFA
- Distributed by: UFA
- Release date: 26 September 1928
- Running time: 75 minutes
- Country: Germany
- Languages: Silent; German intertitles

The Lady with the Mask (German: Die Dame mit der Maske) is a 1928 German silent film directed by Wilhelm Thiele and starring Max Gülstorff, Arlette Marchal and Vladimir Gajdarov. It was shot at the Babelsberg Studios in Berlin. The film's sets were designed by the art director Erich Czerwonski.

== Cast ==
- Max Gülstorff as Freiherr von Seefeld
- Arlette Marchal as Doris von Seefeld - seine Tochter
- Vladimir Gajdarov as Alexander von Illagin
- Heinrich George as Otto Hanke, ein Holzhändler
- Dita Parlo as Kitty
- Paul Hörbiger as Michael - ein russischer Bauernknecht
- Gyula Szőreghy as Direktor des Apollo Theaters
- Harry Lamberts-Paulsen as Der Regisseur
- Fritz Kampers as Der Inspizient
- Gertrud Eysoldt as Eine Garderobenfrau

== Bibliography ==
- Hans-Michael Bock and Tim Bergfelder. The Concise Cinegraph: An Encyclopedia of German Cinema. Berghahn Books.
