= Theatre (1928 film) =

1928 film directed by Mario Bonnard

- Directed by: Mario Bonnard
- Written by: Curt J. Braun; Otto Rung (novel)
- Produced by: Seymour Nebenzal
- Starring: Marcella Albani; Heinrich George; Jean Bradin
- Cinematography: Günther Krampf
- Production companies: Jakob Karol Film; Nero-Film
- Distributed by: Bavaria Film
- Release date: 5 November 1928
- Country: Germany
- Languages: Silent; German intertitles

Theatre or The Last Supper (German: Das letzte Souper) is a 1928 German silent film directed by Mario Bonnard and starring Marcella Albani, Heinrich George and Jean Bradin.

The film's sets were designed by the art director Julius von Borsody.

== Cast ==
- Marcella Albani as Viola Suroff
- Heinrich George as Stroganoff
- Jean Bradin as Sadi
- Evi Eva as Margot
- Sig Arno as Gaston
- Ita Rina as Maria
- Wolfgang von Schwindt as Dombrowsky
- Corry Bell as Elsa
- Valerie Boothby as Gräfin Geschow
- Paul Hörbiger as Balletmeister
- Raimondo Van Riel as Zemikoff
- Otto Kronburger as Kommissar
- Otto Wallburg as Tenas
- Eduardo D'Accursio as Paschkin

== Bibliography ==
- Hans-Michael Bock and Tim Bergfelder. The Concise Cinegraph: An Encyclopedia of German Cinema. Berghahn Books.
