= The White Devil (1930 film) =

1930 film

- Directed by: Alexandre Volkoff
- Written by: Leo Tolstoy (novella); Michel Linsky; Alexandre Volkoff
- Produced by: Noë Bloch; Gregor Rabinovitch
- Starring: Ivan Mozzhukhin; Lil Dagover; Betty Amann; Fritz Alberti
- Cinematography: Curt Courant; Reimar Kuntze; Nikolai Toporkoff
- Music by: Michael Lewin; Marc Roland; Willy Schmidt-Gentner
- Production company: UFA
- Distributed by: UFA
- Release date: 29 January 1930
- Running time: 110 minutes
- Country: Germany
- Language: German

The White Devil (German: Der weiße Teufel) is a 1930 German historical drama film directed by Alexandre Volkoff and starring Ivan Mozzhukhin, Lil Dagover and Betty Amann. It was based on Leo Tolstoy's 1912 novella Hadji Murat. It was originally made as a silent film, with a soundtrack added later. Anatole Litvak worked as the film's assistant director and production manager. It was shot at the Babelsberg Studios in Berlin. The film's sets were designed by the art directors Alexandre Lochakoff and Vladimir Meingard. After location shooting in Nice, Switzerland and the French Alps during 1929, it premiered at the Ufa-Palast am Zoo in January 1930.

Full film

== Cast ==
- Ivan Mozzhukhin as Hadschi Murat
- Lil Dagover as Nelidowa
- Betty Amann as Saira
- Fritz Alberti as Nicolai I
- Acho Chakatouny as Schamil
- George Seroff as Rjaboff
- Alexander Murski as Woronzoff
- Kenneth Rive as Jussuff, Murat's son
- Eduardowa-Ballett as Dancers
- Henry Bender
- Rudolf Biebrach
- Alexej Bondireff
- Bobby Burns
- Arthur Cavara
- Hugo Döblin
- Harry Hardt
- Serge Jaroff
- A. Kawarro
- Peter Lorre (unknown role - not easily visible in the film)
- Lydia Potechina
- Marianne Winkelstern

== Bibliography ==
- Kreimeier, Klaus (1999). The Ufa story: a history of Germany's greatest film company, 1918-1945. Berkeley, Calif. London: University of California Press. ISBN 978-0-520-22069-0.
