= Jean Bradin =

French actor (1899–1969)

Jean Bradin (30 May 1899 – 7 October 1969) was a French actor.

Bradin was born in the 5th arrondissement of Paris and died in the 15th arrondissement of Paris.

== Selected filmography ==
- The Island of Despair (1926)
- The Bordellos of Algiers (1927)
- A Modern Dubarry (1927)
- At the Edge of the World (1927)
- Champagne (1928)
- Moulin Rouge (1928)
- Theater (1928)
- Ariadne in Hoppegarten (1928)
- Call at Midnight (1929)
- Miss Europe (1930)
- Le secret du docteur (1930)
- David Golder (1931)
- The Accomplice (1932)
- Law of the North (1939)

== Bibliography ==
- St. Pierre, Paul Matthew. E.A. Dupont and his Contribution to British Film: Varieté, Moulin Rouge, Piccadilly, Atlantic, Two worlds, Cape Forlorn. Fairleigh Dickinson University Press, 2010
