= Paul Beckers =

German actor (1878–1965)

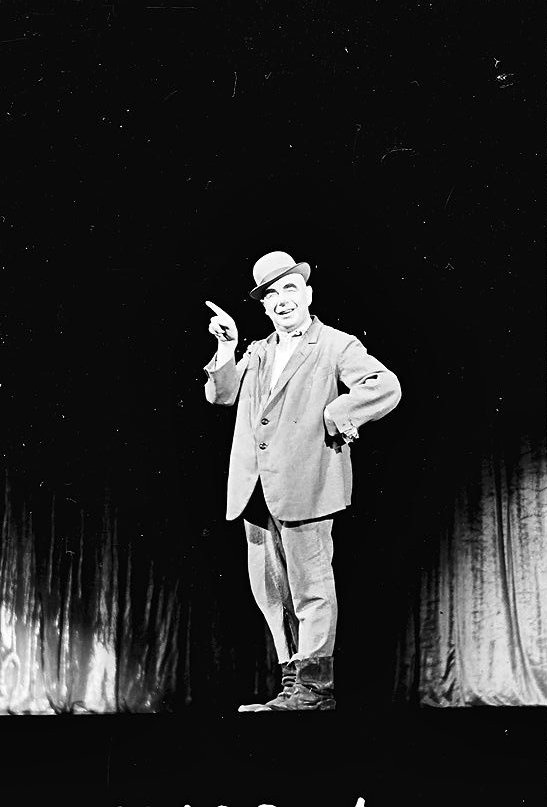
- Born: 1 November 1878; Magdeburg, German Empire
- Died: 27 April 1965 (aged 86); Leipzig, East Germany
- Occupation: Actor
- Years active: 1918-1936

Paul Beckers (1 November 1878 – 27 April 1965) was a German comedian ("Fliegentüten-Heinrich") and actor. He appeared in more than 35 films between 1917 and 1936.

== Selected filmography ==
- Der Fliegentüten-Heinrich (1917)
- Fliegentüten-Heinrich als Don Juan (1918)
- Heinrich sucht eine Lieblingsfrau (1920)
- The Heath Is Green (1932)
- Dream of the Rhine (1933)
- When the Village Music Plays on Sunday Nights (1933)
- The Valiant Navigator (1935)
- Pillars of Society (1935)
- I Love All the Women (1935)
