= The Frankish Song =

1923 film

- Directed by: Hubert Moest; Friedrich Weissenberg
- Written by: Eberhard Frowein
- Produced by: Friedrich Weissenberg
- Starring: Heinrich George
- Cinematography: Anton Mülleneisen
- Music by: Hugo Moesgen
- Production company: Aladin-Film
- Release date: 8 June 1923
- Country: Germany
- Languages: Silent; German intertitles

The Frankish Song (German:Das fränkische Lied) is a 1923 German silent film directed by Hubert Moest and Friedrich Weissenberg and starring Heinrich George.

The film's art direction was by Gustav A. Knauer.

== Cast ==
In alphabetical order

- Gerda Frey as Freundin
- Heinrich George
- Josef Reithofer
- Artur Retzbach as Narr
- Felix Stegemann
- Hedda Vernon as Burgherrin
- Ferry von Farrar
- Hertha von Walther
- Eduard von Winterstein as Verräterische Freund

== Bibliography ==
- Horst O. Hermanni. Von Jean Gabin bis Walter Huston, Volume 3.
