= The Tiger Murder Case =

1930 film

- Directed by: Johannes Meyer
- Written by: Rudolph Cartier; Egon Eis
- Produced by: Alfred Zeisler
- Starring: Charlotte Susa; Harry Frank; Hertha von Walther
- Cinematography: Carl Hoffmann
- Music by: Robert Gilbert; Willi Kollo; Hans May; Hans Pflanzer
- Production company: UFA
- Distributed by: UFA
- Release date: 15 April 1930
- Running time: 70 minutes
- Country: Germany
- Language: German

The Tiger Murder Case (German: Der Tiger) is a 1930 German mystery film directed by Johannes Meyer and starring Charlotte Susa, Harry Frank and Hertha von Walther. It was shot at the Babelsberg Studios in Berlin. The film's sets were designed by the art director Willi Herrmann.

== Synopsis ==
A mysterious killer nicknamed The Tiger is on the loose, leading to frantic attempts to identify them.

== Cast ==
- Charlotte Susa as Die Dame im Abendkleid
- Harry Frank as Der Mann im Frack
- Hertha von Walther as Die Ausländerin
- Trude Berliner as Trude
- Max Wilmsen as Graf Eggenhorst
- Max Maximilian as Der Wirt
- Erich Kestin as Zauber-Gustav
- Henry Pleß as Der Ringkämpfer
- Ethel Helten as Lotte
- Ernst Behmer as Der Schlepper
- Jens Keith as Der Tänzer
- Leo Monosson as Der Sänger
- Friedrich Kurth as Der Zeitungsverkäufer
- Ernst Dernburg as Kriminalkommissär Möller
- Viktor Gehring as Kriminalkommissär Holzknecht
- Alfred Beierle as Der Polizeiarzt

== Bibliography ==
- Bergfelder, Tim & Bock, Hans-Michael. The Concise Cinegraph: Encyclopedia of German. Berghahn Books, 2009.
