= Alarm at Midnight =

1931 film

- Directed by: Johannes Meyer
- Written by: Jane Bess; Paul Beyer
- Produced by: Erich Schicker; Karl Schulz; Robert Wüllner
- Starring: Hans Stüwe; Hans Brausewetter; Otto Wallburg; Gerda Maurus
- Cinematography: Carl Drews
- Music by: Felix Günther
- Production companies: Schulz & Wuellner Filmfabrikations
- Distributed by: Lothar Stark-Film
- Release date: 27 October 1931
- Running time: 83 minutes
- Country: Germany
- Language: German

Alarm at Midnight or Help! Armed Assault! (German: Hilfe! Überfall!) is a 1931 German thriller film directed by Johannes Meyer and starring Hans Stüwe, Hans Brausewetter, and Otto Wallburg.

The film's sets were designed by the art director Alexander Ferenczy.

== Cast ==
- Hans Stüwe as Kriminalkommissar Bremer
- Hans Brausewetter as Kriminalkommissar Braun
- Otto Wallburg as Karl Matthes
- Gerda Maurus as Irene Matthes, seine Nichte
- Eva Schmid-Kayser as Else Moll
- Hermann Vallentin as Kriminalrat Kipping
- Veit Harlan as Otto Weigandt - genannt der 'Schränker'
- Bruno Lopinski as Kriminalkommissar Hartmann
- Hugo Fischer-Köppe as Matrosen-Emil
- Harry Nestor as Artisten-Fredy
- Ludwig Stössel as Der Varieté-Agent
- Siegfried Berisch as Pensionsgast
- Rudolf van der Noss as Kriminalassistent
- Georg Guertler as Mitglied der drei Bandinis
- Rudolf Hilberg as Mitglied der drei Bandinis
- Otto Reinwald as Mitglied der drei Bandinis
- Fritz Schmuck as Diener bei Matthes

== Bibliography ==
- Noack, Frank (2016). Veit Harlan: The Life and Work of a Nazi Filmmaker. University Press of Kentucky. ISBN 978-0-8131-6702-2.
