= Sprengbagger 1010 =

1929 film

- Directed by: Carl Ludwig Achaz-Duisberg
- Written by: Carl Ludwig Achaz-Duisberg
- Produced by: Carl Ludwig Achaz-Duisberg; Hans von Wolzogen
- Starring: Heinrich George; Viola Garden; Ivan Koval-Samborsky
- Cinematography: Herbert Körner; Helmar Lerski; Hugo von Kaweczynski; Artur von Schwertführer
- Production company: Terra Film
- Distributed by: Terra Film
- Release date: 25 November 1929
- Country: Germany
- Languages: Silent; German intertitles

Sprengbagger 1010 (which translates roughly as: Explodigger 1010 or Explosives Excavator 1010) is a 1929 German silent film directed by Carl Ludwig Achaz-Duisberg and starring Heinrich George, Viola Garden and Ivan Koval-Samborsky.

The film's sets were designed by the art director Andrej Andrejew.

== Cast ==
- Heinrich George as Direktor March
- Viola Garden as Olga Lossen
- Ivan Koval-Samborsky as Ingenieur Karl Hartmann
- Ilse Stobrawa as Camilla von Einerm
- Gertrud Arnold as Die alte Hartmann
- Paul Biensfeldt as Inspektor Bachmann
- Paul Henckels as Gemeindevorsteher
- Ilse Vigdor as Zofe

== Bibliography ==
- Alpi, Deborah Lazaroff. Robert Siodmak: A Biography, with Critical Analyses of His Films Noirs and a Filmography of All His Works. McFarland, 1998.
