= Trenck (film) =

1932 film

- German: Trenck – Der Roman einer großen Liebe
- Directed by: Ernst Neubach; Heinz Paul
- Written by: Bruno Frank (novel); Ernst Neubach; Heinz Paul
- Produced by: Herbert Silbermann
- Starring: Hans Stüwe; Dorothea Wieck; Olga Chekhova; Theodor Loos
- Cinematography: Georg Bruckbauer; Carl Drews; Karl Hasselmann
- Music by: Hans May
- Production company: Phoebus Film
- Release date: 28 October 1932
- Running time: 100 minutes
- Country: Germany
- Language: German

Trenck (German: Trenck – Der Roman einer großen Liebe) is a 1932 German historical film directed by Ernst Neubach and Heinz Paul starring Hans Stüwe, Dorothea Wieck, and Olga Chekhova. The film was based on a novel by Bruno Frank. It was shot at the Johannisthal Studios with sets designed by the art director Erich Czerwonski. It depicts the life of the eighteenth century adventurer Friedrich von der Trenck.

== Cast ==
- Hans Stüwe as Freiherr von der Trenck
- Dorothea Wieck as Princess Amalie of Prussia
- Olga Chekhova as Tsarin Elisabeth of Russia
- Theodor Loos as King Frederick II of Prussia
- Paul Hörbiger as President Löwenwalde
- Anton Pointner as Trenck
- Gretl Schubert as Princess Ulrika of Prussia
- Fritz Vogtherr as Lieutenant von Rochow
- Eduard von Winterstein as Wilhem Heinrich Freiherr von der Goltz
- Alfred Gerasch as General Seydlitz
- Charles Willy Kayser as Commander
- Paul Biensfeldt as Fredersdorff
- Kurt Fuß as Major Doo
- Walter Steinbeckas King Frederick William II.
- Bruno Ziener as Minister Alvensleben
- Carl Mahnke as Tsar Peter III of Russia
- Nico Turoff as Potemkin
- F.W. Schröder-Schrom as Preuß. Gesandter am russ. Hof
- Friedrich Ettel as Prussian Resident in Danzig
- Fred Goebel as Major
- Ludwig Trautmann as Kommandant der Festung Magdeburg
- Henry Pleß as General
- Cordy Millowitsch as Empress Maria Theresia
- Hermann Blaß as Lopresti
- Hanns Waschatko as Kommissar
- Franz Klebusch as Bürgermeister Nüßler
- Ernst Wurmser as Grenzwirt
- Hilde Koller as Milenka
- Karl Meinhardt as Voltaire
- Carl de Vogt as Duke von Württemberg
- Irmgard Alberti as Herzogin
- Erwin van Roy as Bauernbursche
- Max Grünberg as Fuhrmann
- Sascha Gura
- Senta Liberty
- Charlotte Michael
- Albert Probeck
- Hermann Schroder
- Annemarie von Rochhausen

== Bibliography ==
- Klossner, Michael (2002). The Europe of 1500–1815 on Film and Television. Jefferson, NC: McFarland. ISBN 978-0-7864-1223-5.
