= Betty Amann =

German-American actress (1905–1990)

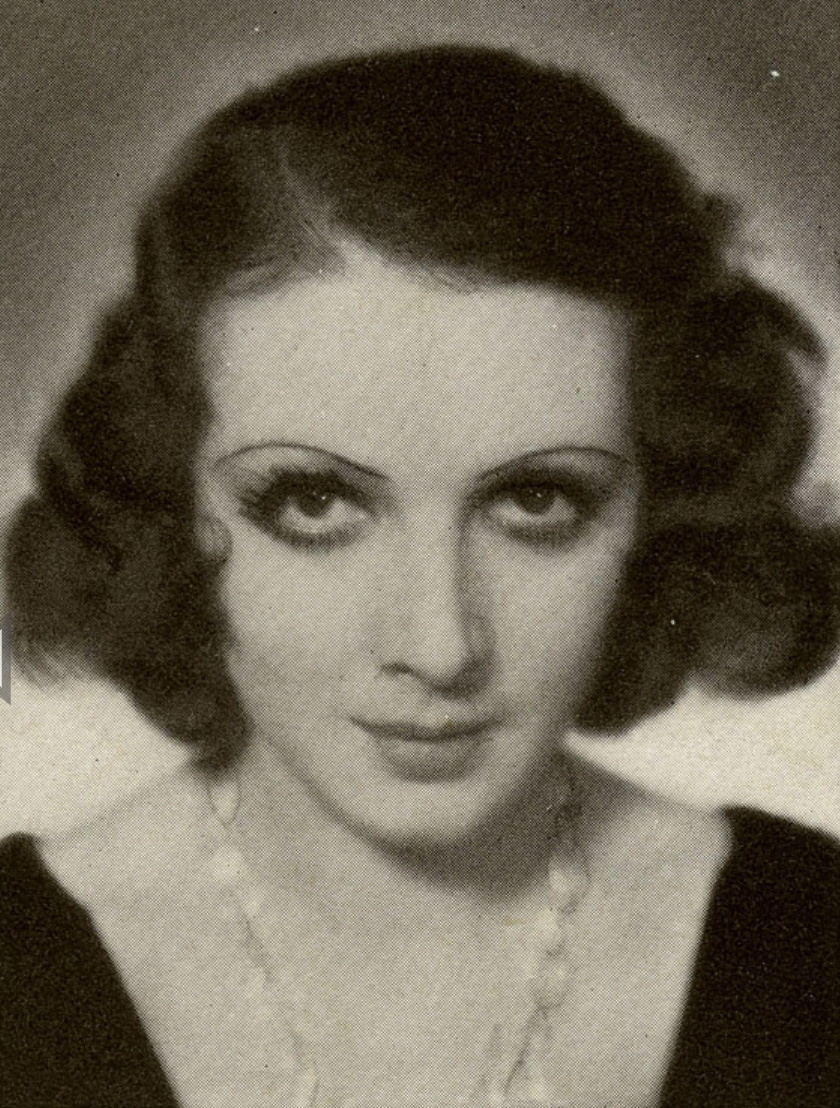
- Amann in 1933
- Born: Philippine Amann; 10 March 1905; Pirmasens, German Empire
- Died: 2 or 3 August 1990 (aged 85); Danbury, Connecticut, U.S.
- Resting place: Willowbrook Cemetery
- Other name: Bee Amann
- Occupation: Actress
- Years active: 1926–1943
- Spouse: David B. Stillman (m. 1938; died 1963)

Philippine Amann (10 March 1905 – 2 or 3 August 1990), known professionally as Betty Amann, was an American film actress. Born to American parents in the German Empire, she began her acting career in the United States with the film The Kick-Off (1926). She is perhaps best known for her role in Asphalt (1929).

== Early years ==
Philippine Amann was born in 1905 (some sources say 1906 or 1907) in Pirmasens to a Swiss-German Lutheran family. She has also been referred to as Jewish. Raised in America, Amann studied painting at the National Academy School of Fine Arts in New York; she had been an intent lover of art and painting since childhood.

== Career ==
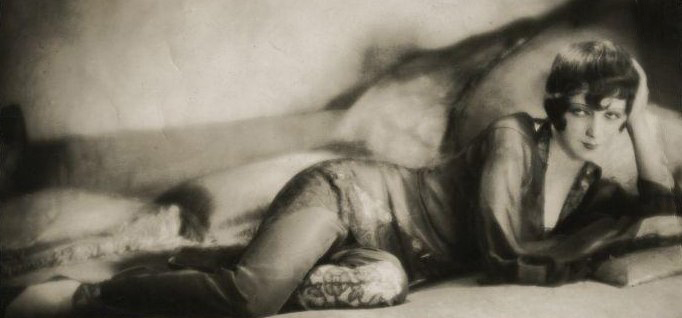
Amann in Asphalt, 1929

Amann acted in small parts at the May Palace Theater before making her screen debut in The Kick-Off (1926), credited as Bee Amann. She next appeared in seven Mack Sennett short comedies, including The Campus Vamp (1928), which also featured a pre-Hollywood fame Carole Lombard.

Her first major film role was in the western Trail of the Horse Thieves (1929). In 1928, she traveled to Germany, where she met Erich Pommer and Joe May, who picked her for the female lead in Asphalt (1929). It was Pommer who gave Amann the pseudonym Betty. She remained in Germany, where she next starred in The Convict from Istanbul (1929) with Heinrich George and Paul Hörbiger. The newspaper Vossische Zeitung wrote of her role in the film, "She was not at all born to portray unexperienced, middle-class girls".

She followed up with The White Devil, and traveled to Poland, where she appeared in Niebezpieczny romans (1930), which was her last silent film.

Her talkie debut was in The Great Longing (1930), which she appeared in as herself. Her following speaking parts included a millionaire's daughter in Oh Those Glorious Old Student Days (1930), as well as an alluring stranger who turns out to be a murderer in Carl Froelich's crime film Hans in Every Street (1930).

In 1931, she traveled to England, where she appeared in Alfred Hitchcock's Rich and Strange (1931), as well as an array of comedies. Back in Germany, she starred in The Big Bluff, Die kleine Schwindlerin, and Tugboat M 17, in which she portrayed a prostitute and thief who seduces a family man.

Upon the rise of Nazism, Amann emigrated to England. She married David B. Stillman in 1938 and returned to America for the final time. Her final film role was as a harbor prostitute in Edgar G. Ulmer's treasure hunter movie Isle of Forgotten Sins (1943).

In 1987, Amann received the German award Filmband in Gold for her long and outstanding work and performance for the German film. Uta Berg-Ganschow wrote of her, "Her eyes are the mirror of other people's wishes. That's what makes them attractive – they're brazen. These eyes do not reveal anything, they merely attract looks. Men are quick to jump upon these wishes: the calculated tear, the teetering bow above her bottom, her curls. All this is banished into the world of the demimonde. But why would the viewers care into what kind of social figure their fantasy is transformed? […] Instead of becoming the picture of fallen morality, Betty Amann becomes the picture of self-assured transgression."

== Personal life and death ==
Amann was married to David B. Stillman until his death in April 1963.

Amann died of Alzheimers on 2 or 3 August 1990. She was cremated at Ferncliff Crematorium in Hartsdale, New York on 4 August 1990 and buried at Willowbrook Cemetery in Westport, Connecticut on 23 May 1991.

== Filmography ==
Year	Title	Role	Notes
1926	The Kick-Off	Ruth	Credited as Bee Amann
1928	Smith's Holiday		Short, uncredited role
1928	The Beach Club		Short, uncredited role
1928	A Simple Sap	She	Short
1928	The Best Man		Short, uncredited role
1928	The Campus Carmen		Short; extra, uncredited role
1928	Motorboat Mamas	Catalina, Café Patron	Short, uncredited role
1928	Hubby's Weekend Trip	Charley's 2nd girlfriend	Short, credited as Bee Amann
1928	The Campus Vamp		Short, uncredited role
1929	Trail of the Horse Thieves	Amy Taggart	Credited as Bee Amann
1929	Asphalt	Else Kramer	
1929	The Rodeo		Short, uncredited role
1929	The Convict from Istanbul	Hilde Wollwarth	
1930	The White Devil	Saira	
1930	Niebezpieczny romans	Ada	
1930	The Great Longing	Herself	
1930	Oh Those Glorious Old Student Days	Norma, dessen Tochter	
1930	Hans in Every Street	Nelly, die Andere	
1931	The Song of the Nations		
1931	The Perfect Lady	Jacqueline Dubarry	
1931	Rich and Strange (German title Endlich sind wir reich)	The Princess	
1931	Strictly Business	Theodora Smith	
1931	Pyjamas Preferred	Violet Ray	
1933	The Big Bluff	Marion Millner	
1933	Daughters of Today	Joan	
1933	The Little Crook	Gwendoline	
1933	Tugboat M 17	Gescha	
1933	Strictly in Confidence	Rita	Short
1938	In Old Mexico	Janet Leeds	
1939	Nancy Drew... Reporter	Eula Denning	
1943	Isle of Forgotten Sins	Olga	Final film role
