= Heinz Fenchel =

German art director and architect (1906–1988)

- Born: 11 September 1906; Berlin, German Empire
- Died: 1988 (aged 81–82)
- Other name: Heinz Chaim Fenchel
- Occupations: Art director, Architect
- Years active: 1929–1935 (film)

Heinz Fenchel (1906–1988) was a German art director, who designed the sets for a number of films in Weimar Germany and Czechoslovakia. He worked on several films with the director Pál Fejös. The Jewish Fenchel later emigrated to Israel where he worked as an architect.

== Selected filmography ==
- Ship in Distress (1929)
- The Model from Montparnasse (1929)
- Phantoms of Happiness (1929)
- The Black Forest Girl (1929)
- The Convict from Istanbul (1929)
- Troika (1930)
- The Squeaker (1931)
- The Forester's Daughter (1931)
- Mamsell Nitouche (1932)
- Kiki (1932)
- The Ringer (1932)
- Ways to a Good Marriage (1933)
- The Golden Smile (1935)

== Bibliography ==
- Elisabeth Büttner. Paul Fejos. Verlag Filmarchiv Austria, 2004.
