= The Big Bluff (1933 German film) =

1933 film

- Directed by: Georg Jacoby
- Written by: Fred Heller (play); Adolf Schütz (play); Walter Schlee; Walter Wassermann
- Produced by: George W. Weeks
- Starring: Lee Parry; Betty Amann; Harald Paulsen
- Cinematography: Carl Drews
- Edited by: Hanne Kuyt
- Music by: Franz Grothe
- Production company: Tobis Film
- Distributed by: Tobis Film
- Release date: 2 February 1933
- Running time: 79 minutes
- Country: Germany
- Language: German

The Big Bluff (German: Der Große Bluff) is a 1933 German comedy film directed by Georg Jacoby and starring Lee Parry, Betty Amann, and Harald Paulsen. It was shot at the EFA Studios in Berlin. The film's sets were designed by the art director Erich Czerwonski.

== Synopsis ==
Thieves break into the villa of film star Marion Millner, but only get away with her imitation jewellery. Film producer Otto Pitt, currently shooting a crime movie, thinks the break-in will make great publicity for his production.

== Cast ==
- Lee Parry as Gisa Langer
- Betty Amann as Marion Millner
- Harald Paulsen as Harry Neuhoff
- Otto Wallburg as Otto Pitt, Generaldirektor
- Paul Hörbiger as Arthur Richman
- Adele Sandrock as Frau Timm
- Hugo Fischer-Köppe as Kommissar Keller
- Walter Steinbeck as Der Kriminalrat
- Theo Lingen as Der Pressechef
- Sigurd Lohde as Der Regisseur
- Gerti Ober as Die Zofe
- Fred Immler as Paul, der Komplize
- Alfred Beierle as Kriminalbeamter Kube
- Adolf E. Licho as Paradieser
- Ellen Blarr as Eine Sekretärin
- Gerhard Dammann as Ein Klavierspieler
- Nini Theilade as Eine Tänzerin

== Bibliography ==
- Klaus, Ulrich J. Deutsche Tonfilme: Jahrgang 1933. Klaus-Archiv, 1988.
