= Ways to a Good Marriage =

1933 film

- Directed by: Adolf Trotz
- Written by: Jacob Brodsky
- Produced by: Willy Haas; Adolf Trotz; Theodore H. Van de Velde
- Starring: Olga Chekhova; Alfred Abel; Hilde Hildebrand
- Cinematography: Georg Krause
- Production company: Gnom-Tonfilm
- Release date: 14 June 1933
- Running time: 81 minutes
- Country: Germany
- Language: German

Ways to a Good Marriage (German: Wege zur guten Ehe) is a 1933 German drama film directed by Adolf Trotz and starring Olga Chekhova, Alfred Abel and Hilde Hildebrand. It was shot at the EFA Studios in Halensee in Berlin. The film's sets were designed by the art directors Heinz Fenchel and Botho Hoefer.

A separate French-language version L'amour qu'il faut aux femmes was released in 1934. While also directed by Trotz, it featured a different cast except for Olga Chekhova.

== Cast ==
- Olga Chekhova as Claire Veiler, die unbefriedigte Frau
- Alfred Abel as Generaldirektor Veller, der Mann, der Kindersegen fürchtet
- Hilde Hildebrand as Eugenie von Bergen, die nymphomanische Frau
- Theodor Loos as Dr. von Bergen, der betrogene Mann
- Ali Ghito as Nadja, die eifersüchtige Frau
- Hertha Guthmar as Marceline, eine Studentin
- Lisa Mar as Eine Gymnastiklehrerin
- Lotte Lorring as Die hübsche Sekretärin
- Otto Wallburg as 'Tange Paula', Eheberatung
- Walter Janssen as Dr. Bäumler, der Mann, der keine Zeit hat

== Production ==
Ways to a Good Marriage was based on the ideas of the sexologist Theodore H. Van de Velde, whose works were banned by the Nazis.

== Release ==
The censors approved the film for release on 16 May 1933. It was banned on 7 March 1937.

== Works cited ==
- Hull, David (1969). Film in the Third Reich: Art and Propaganda in Nazi Germany. Simon & Schuster. SBN 671214861.

== Bibliography ==
- Bock, Hans-Michael & Bergfelder, Tim. The Concise Cinegraph: Encyclopaedia of German Cinema. Berghahn Books, 2009.
- Klaus, Ulrich J. Deutsche Tonfilme: Jahrgang 1933. Klaus-Archiv, 1988.
