= What Women Dream =

1933 film directed by Géza von Bolváry

- Directed by: Géza von Bolváry
- Written by: Franz Schulz; Billy Wilder
- Produced by: Julius Haimann
- Starring: Nora Gregor; Gustav Fröhlich; Otto Wallburg
- Cinematography: Willy Goldberger
- Edited by: Käthe Kopitzke
- Music by: Robert Stolz
- Production company: Super-Film
- Distributed by: Bavaria Film
- Release date: 4 April 1933
- Running time: 90 minutes
- Country: Germany
- Language: German

What Women Dream (German: Was Frauen träumen) is a 1933 German comedy crime film directed by Géza von Bolváry and starring Nora Gregor, Gustav Fröhlich, and Otto Wallburg. In 1934, it was remade as an American film One Exciting Adventure. The film's sets were designed by the art directors Emil Hasler and Willy Schiller.

== Cast ==
- Nora Gregor as Rina Korff
- Gustav Fröhlich as Walter Koenig
- Otto Wallburg as Kleinsilber
- Peter Lorre as Otto Fuessli
- Kurt Horwitz as Levassor alias John Constaninescu
- Lya Christy
- Erik Ode
- Carl Auen
- Eric Steinbeck
- Kurt Lilien
- Hilde Maroff
- Eric Helgar

== Bibliography ==
- Youngkin, Stephen D. (2005). The Lost One: A Life of Peter Lorre. Lexington: University Press of Kentucky. ISBN 978-0-8131-7185-2.
