= The Gentleman from Maxim's =

1933 film directed by Carl Boese

- German film poster
- German: Die Herren vom Maxim
- Directed by: Carl Boese
- Written by: Bobby E. Lüthge; Károly Nóti
- Produced by: Felix Pfitzner; Ilja Salkind
- Starring: Lee Parry; Johannes Riemann; Oskar Karlweis
- Cinematography: Carl Drews; Heinz Kluth
- Edited by: Hildegard Grebner
- Music by: Franz Grothe; Oscar Straus
- Production company: T.K. Tonfilm-Produktion
- Distributed by: National Film; Kiba Filmverleih (Austria)
- Release date: 1 January 1933
- Running time: 92 minutes
- Country: Germany
- Language: German

The Gentleman from Maxim's (German: Die Herren vom Maxim) is a 1933 German comedy film directed by Carl Boese and starring Lee Parry, Johannes Riemann and Oskar Karlweis. It was shot at the Johannisthal Studios in Berlin. The film's sets were designed by the art director Gustav A. Knauer and Walter Reimann.

== Synopsis ==
A lawyer falls in love with a pretty soubrette. When a womanizer friend comes to visit, the lawyer tries to pair the potential competitor off with another woman.

== Cast ==
- Lee Parry as Ursula Heider
- Johannes Riemann as Hans Volkmann
- Oskar Karlweis as Werner Radke
- Leo Slezak as Rübsam - chamber singer
- Manny Ziener as Laura Pikardt
- Jessie Vihrog as Mimi
- Käthe Haack and Ernst Behmer as a married couple
- Albert Florath
- Anita Mey
- Kitty Meinhardt
- Julius Brandt
- Erich Fiedler
- Kurt Werther
- Ellen Blarr
- Oscar Joost as Kapellmeister

== Bibliography ==
- Klaus, Ulrich J. Deutsche Tonfilme: Jahrgang 1933. Klaus-Archiv, 1988.
