= When the Village Music Plays on Sunday Nights (1933 film) =

1933 film

- Directed by: Charles Klein
- Written by: Franz Rauch
- Produced by: Conny Carstennsen; Max G. Hüske
- Starring: Harry Liedtke; Maria Paudler; Jakob Tiedtke
- Cinematography: Karl Hasselmann
- Edited by: Paul May
- Music by: Marty Fryberg
- Production company: Terra Film
- Distributed by: Terra Film
- Release date: 5 September 1933
- Running time: 87 minutes
- Country: Germany
- Language: German

When the Village Music Plays on Sunday Nights (German: Wenn am Sonntagabend die Dorfmusik spielt) is a 1933 German musical comedy film directed by Charles Klein and starring Harry Liedtke, Maria Paudler and Jakob Tiedtke. It was shot at the Marienfelde Studios of Terra Film in Berlin. The film's sets were designed by the art directors Hermann Warm and Bruno Lutz. It was remade as a West German film of the same title in 1953.

== Synopsis ==
In Thuringia Baron Ottfried von Hannstein is an eccentric, world-weary landowner who has withdrawn into a fascination with astrology while allowing his estate to fall into ruin. His life changes when he meets Gerda Lansberg, a spirited writer who is determined to bring him back to reality. Through her influence and a developing romance, Ottfried eventually abandons his cosmic preoccupations and transforms into an energetic farmer.

== Cast ==
- Harry Liedtke as Baron Ottfried von Hannstein, Gutsbesitzer
- Maria Paudler as Gerda Lansberg, Schriftstellerin
- Jakob Tiedtke as Josef Bendler, Müller
- Else Elster as Steffi, seine Tochter
- Olaf Bach as Hans Lange, ein junger Bauer
- Karl Bartels as Der Lehrer
- Paul Beckers as Pfifferling
- Heinz Berghaus as Der Schmied, Dorfmusikant
- Gaston Briese as Otto Germann, Wirt des Dorfkruges
- Gerhard Dammann as Der Schuster, Dorfmusikant
- Carl de Vogt as Fritz Wendhofer, Gutsverwalter
- Werner Finck as Franz, Diener des Barons
- Kurt Hoellger as Der Bader, Dorfmusikant
- Jutta Jol as Magd im Dorfkrug
- Albert Karchow as Der Dorfschulze
- Charles Willy Kayser as Der Arzt
- Carsta Löck as Stine, Gutsmagd
- Arthur Reppert as Der Schneider, Dorfmusikant
- Alfred Stratmann as Der Förster

== Bibliography ==
- Davidson, John & Hake, Sabine. Take Two: Fifties Cinema in Divided Germany. Berghahn Books, 2007.
- Klaus, Ulrich J. Deutsche Tonfilme: Jahrgang 1933. Klaus-Archiv, 1988.
- Waldman, Harry. Nazi Films in America, 1933-1942. McFarland, 2008.
