= Deutschland erwacht – Ein Dokument von der Wiedergeburt Deutschlands =

1933 film

Deutschland erwacht
- Starring: See below
- Release date: 1933
- Country: Germany
- Language: German

Deutschland erwacht is a 1933 German Nazi propaganda film.

== Cast ==
- Johannes Engel
- Wilhelm Frick
- Günther Gereke
- Joseph Goebbels
- Hermann Göring
- Johann Ludwig Graf Schwerin von Krosigk
- Adolf Hitler as himself
- Alfred Hugenberg
- Franz Seldte
- Werner von Blomberg
- Paul Freiherr von Eltz-Rübenach
- Paul von Hindenburg
- Franz von Papen
