= Dream of the Rhine =

1933 film

- Directed by: Herbert Selpin
- Written by: Herbert Eulenberg; Herbert Selpin
- Produced by: Robert Neppach
- Starring: Eduard Wesener; Käthe Haack; Hugo Fischer-Köppe
- Cinematography: Carl Drews
- Edited by: Elisabeth Kleinert-Neumann
- Music by: Willy Ostermann; Ludwig Schmidseder
- Production company: R.N.-Filmproduktion
- Distributed by: Europa-Filmverleih
- Release date: 18 October 1933
- Running time: 97 minutes
- Country: Germany
- Language: German

Dream of the Rhine (German: Der Traum vom Rhein) is a 1933 German comedy film directed by Herbert Selpin and starring Eduard Wesener, Käthe Haack, and Hugo Fischer-Köppe. It was shot at the Johannisthal Studios in Berlin and on location in the Rhineland.

== Synopsis ==
After several decades away a wealthy German American decides to return to his homeland and take his Americanised daughter along with him.

== Cast ==
- Gay Christie as Mary Steinweg, Tochter
- Eduard Wesener as Hein Fries
- Peter Erkelenz as Apotheker Filsen
- Käthe Haack as Grete, Dellhausens Frau
- F.W. Schröder-Schrom as Jupp Steinweg
- Hugo Fischer-Köppe as Karl Baumann
- Paul Beckers as Keppich
- Paul Henckels as Dellhausen, Wirt zum 'Silbernen Pfropfenzieher'
- Friedrich Ettel as Bürgermeister von Niedernheim
- Hubert von Meyerinck as Conny
- Ilse Stobrawa as Lene, Hamms Tochter
- Walter Steinbeck as Professor Dr. Holzheim
- Fred Immler as Fährmann Hamm

== Bibliography ==
- Waldman, Harry (2008). Nazi Films in America, 1933–1942. McFarland. ISBN 978-0-7864-3861-7.
