= Berta Drews =

German actress

- Born: 19 November 1901; Berlin, German Empire
- Died: 10 April 1987 (aged 85); West Berlin, West Germany
- Occupation: Actress
- Years active: 1933–1983
- Spouse: Heinrich George
- Children: 2, including Götz George

Berta Emilie Helene Drews (German: [ˈbɛʁta heˈleːnə ˈdʁeːfs]; 19 November 1901 – 10 April 1987) was a German stage and film actress. She appeared in more than 60 films from 1933 to 1983. She was married to actor Heinrich George. The couple had two sons, including actor Götz George.

She appeared in the first Nazi film, Hitlerjunge Quex, which premiered in September 1933 in the presence of Adolf Hitler and Baldur von Schirach.

== Filmography ==
Film
Year	Title	Role	Notes
1933	Tugboat M 17	Marie, seine Frau	
1933	Hitlerjunge Quex	Mutter Völker	
1936	Der Kaiser von Kalifornien	Chansonette	
1938	Urlaub auf Ehrenwort	Anna - dessen Frau	
1939	Alarm at Station III	Frauke, Frau von Thomas Kolk	
1941	Above All Else in the World	Anna Möbius	
1941	Heimkehr	Elfriede	
1942	Der große Schatten	Lizzy	
1945	Die Schenke zur ewigen Liebe	Frau Stiel	
1949	Girls Behind Bars	Paula Rellspieß, 'Spiess'	
1950	The Allure of Danger	Witwe Rüger	
1952	Wenn abends die Heide träumt		
1953	Ave Maria	Kerstin Melartin	
1955	Ein Mann vergißt die Liebe		
1955	Eine Frau genügt nicht?		
1955	Lost Child 312	Frau Brennecke	
1956	My Brother Joshua	Franziska Donath	
1956	The Story of Anastasia	Fräulein Peuthert	
1958	It Happened in Broad Daylight	Frau Schrott	
1958	The Girl from the Marsh Croft	Mutter Nilsson	
1958	Polikuschka	Tischlersfrau	
1959	Court Martial	Frau Willmers	
1959	Jons und Erdme	Jasgulka, seine dritte Frau	
1960	Carnival Confession	Frau Bäumler	
1961	Zu jung für die Liebe?	Frau Brehm	
1961	Our House in Cameroon	Tante Edith	
1962	Ich kann nicht länger schweigen	Frau Woitke	
1962	Das Mädchen und der Staatsanwalt	Frau Hecker	
1962	Doctor Sibelius	Babette	
1964	Murderer in the Fog	Frau Ritzel	
1969	Auf Scheißer schießt man nicht		
1974	One or the Other of Us	Mother Braats	
1979	The Tin Drum	Anna Koljaiczek	
1983	Heinrich Penthesilea von Kleist	Oberste	
