= Otto Wallburg =

German actor (1889–1944)

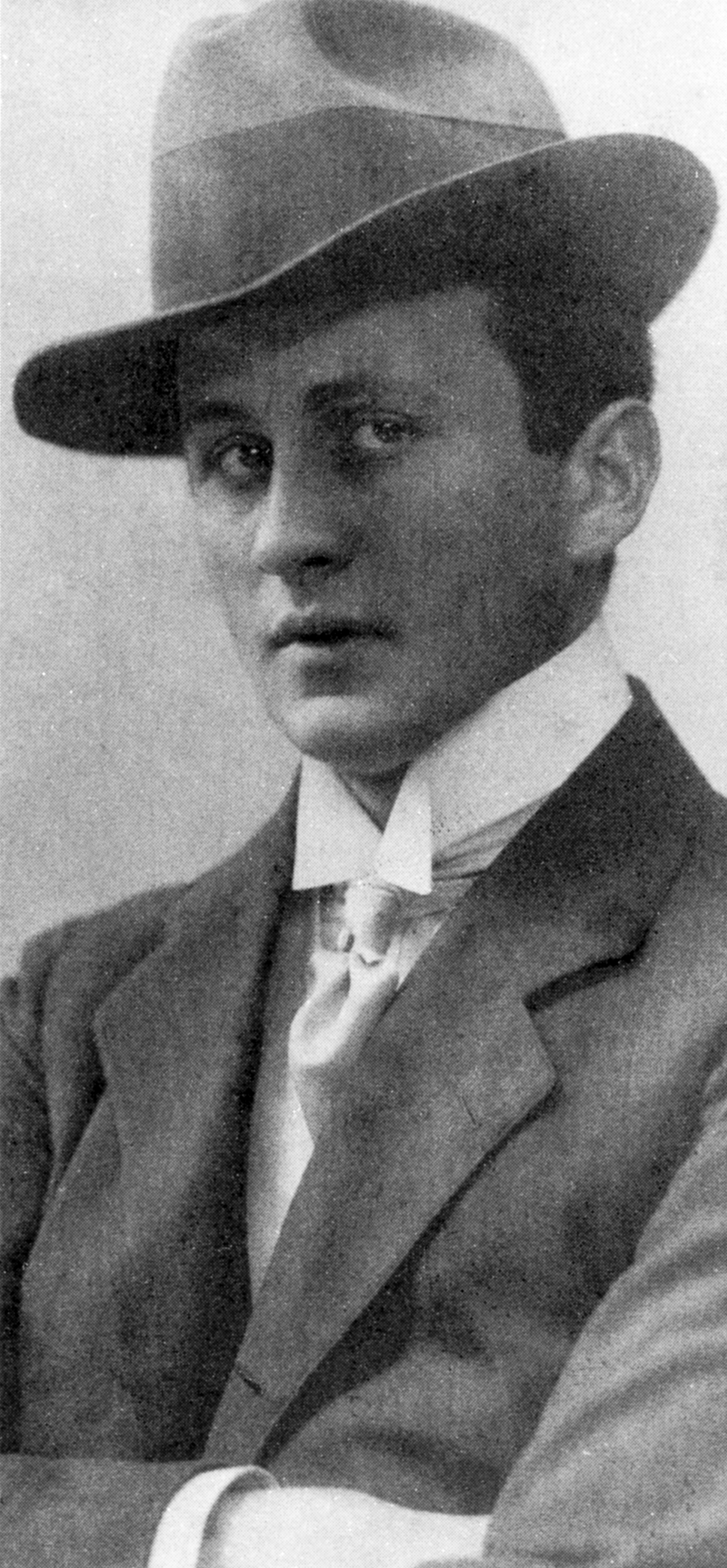
- Otto Wallburg
- Born: Otto Maximilian Wasserzug; 21 February 1889; Berlin, German Empire
- Died: 29 October 1944 (aged 55); Auschwitz-Birkenau, German-occupied Poland
- Other name: Otto Wasserzug
- Occupation: Film actor
- Years active: 1926 – 1938

Otto Wallburg (21 February 1889 – 29 October 1944) was a German actor and Kabarett performer. He was a prolific film actor during the late silent and early sound era. He was arrested by the Nazis when they occupied the Netherlands and was killed in Auschwitz in October 1944.

Wallburg was born Otto Maximilian Wasserzug in Berlin, the son of a Jewish banker. He drifted into stage acting, but served in the German Army during the First World War and was wounded on the Eastern Front after winning an Iron Cross. From 1926 onwards he worked in the large German film industry, including many productions made by UFA.

When the Nazis came to power in 1933 he left Germany and moved to Austria where he continued to work in film. He later moved to France and then on to the Netherlands. He was arrested following the 1940 German invasion of the Netherlands. He was held for a while at Westerbork transit camp, and later deported to Auschwitz where he was murdered towards the end of October 1944.

== Selected filmography ==
- Uneasy Money (1926) - Herr Fischer
- Chaste Susanne (1926) - Charency
- Derby (1926) - Emil Henschke, Fleischwaren en gros
- We'll Meet Again in the Heimat (1926) - Feldwebel Baumann
- Light-Hearted Isabel (1927)
- Heaven on Earth (1927) - Louis Martiny
- Grand Hotel (1927)
- The Transformation of Dr. Bessel (1927) - Ein französischer Sergeant
- The Mistress of the Governor (1927) - Der Zar
- My Friend Harry (1928) - Gen.Dir. Fredy Sanderson
- Love in the Cowshed (1928) - Wenzel, Seifenschneider
- Theatre (1928) - Tenas
- A Modern Casanova (1928)
- The Fourth from the Right (1929)
- The Woman Everyone Loves Is You (1929) - Haucke
- The Crimson Circle (1929) - Marl
- Foolish Happiness (1929)
- The Merry Widower (1929) - Ein Paradegast
- Column X (1929)
- Marriage in Trouble (1929) - Der Standesbeamte
- Foolishness of His Love (1929) - Bürgermeister Boudier
- His Best Friend (1929)
- Trust of Thieves (1929) - Kriminalkommissar Warren
- Men Without Work (1929)
- The Night Belongs to Us (1929) - Vater Bang
- The Widow's Ball (1930) - Teckelmann
- There Is a Woman Who Never Forgets You (1930)
- Heute nacht - eventuell (1930) - Lawyer
- Hocuspocus (1930) - Dr. Schüler
- The Song Is Ended (1930) - Der Baron
- The Jumping Jack (1930) - Clamotte, Direktor des Warenhauses
- Petit officier... Adieu! (1930) - Baron
- Hans in Every Street (1930)
- Her Majesty the Barmaid (1931) - Othmar von Wellingen - Freds Bruder
- Queen of the Night (1931) - Gaston Molneau
- Her Grace Commands (1931)
- Seitensprünge (1931) - Onkel Emil
- That's All That Matters (1931) - Klöppel - ein Maler
- When the Soldiers (1931) - General von Plessow
- The Opera Ball (1931) - von Arnolds - Helgas Vater
- Salto Mortale (1931) - Pressechef
- The Little Escapade (1931) - August Wernecke, Fabrikant
- The Woman They Talk About (1931) - G.Greven
- Bombs on Monte Carlo (1931) - Ministerpräsiden / Minister
- Who Takes Love Seriously? (1931) - Speculator Bruno
- Congress Dances (1931) - Bibikoff, his Adjutant
- Weekend in Paradise (1931)
- Alarm at Midnight (1931) - Karl Matthes
- Der Hochtourist (1931)
- Ronny (1931) - Intendant des Hoftheaters
- Yorck (1931) - Field Marshal Graf Diebitsch-Sabalkanskij
- Distorting at the Resort (1932) - Abeles
- Two Hearts Beat as One (1932)
- The Song of Night (1932) - Pategg
- The Beautiful Adventure (1932) - Valentin le Barroyer
- The Black Hussar (1932) - Gouverneur Darmont
- How Shall I Tell My Husband? (1932) - Hugo Brickner
- Spoiling the Game (1932) - Gottfried Paradies
- Frederica (1932) - Ewiger Student Wagner
- When Love Sets the Fashion (1932) - Philippe Gilbert
- Madame Wants No Children (1933) - Herr Balsam
- The Big Bluff (1933) - Otto Pitt, Generaldirektor
- Marion, That's Not Nice (1933) - Direktor Satorius - Seifenfabrikant
- What Women Dream (1933) - Kleinsilber
- Das häßliche Mädchen (1933) - Direktor Mönckeberg
- Daughter of the Regiment (1933) - Sergeant Bully
- The Little Crook (1933) - Der Bräutigam
- Greetings and Kisses, Veronika (1933) - Max Becker, ein Geschäftsfreund
- Tell Me Who You Are (1933) - Harry Reimers
- Ways to a Good Marriage (1933) - 'Tange Paula', Eheberatung
- Kind, ich freu' mich auf Dein Kommen (1933) - Der Konsul
- The Tsarevich (1933) - Graf Narkyn
- Inge and the Millions (1933) - Conrady, Geschäftsfreund Seemanns
- Financial Opportunists (1934) - Untermeier, Grundstücksspekulant
- Peter (1934) - Mr. Zöllner, garage-owner
- Bretter, die die Welt bedeuten (1934) - Direktor Petermann
- Ball at the Savoy (1935) - Der Verleger Haller
- Everything for the Company (1935) - Emmerich Liebling
- Little Mother (1935) - Max Berkhoff
- Viereinhalb Musketiere (1935) - Bender, pianist
- Heut' ist der schönste Tag in meinem Leben (1935) - Paul Kaspar
- Catherine the Last (1936) - Sixtus Braun, Großindustrieller
- Bubi (1937) - Taxidriver Muck
- Crossroads (1938) - Le médecin allemand (uncredited) (final film role)
