= A Door Opens =

1933 German thriller film

- Directed by: Alfred Zeisler
- Written by: Walter Forster; Franz Roswalt
- Produced by: Alfred Zeisler
- Starring: Hermann Speelmans; Fritz Odemar; Oskar Sima
- Cinematography: Werner Bohne; Werner Brandes
- Edited by: Wolfgang Becker
- Music by: Hans-Otto Borgmann
- Production company: UFA
- Distributed by: UFA
- Release date: 4 January 1933
- Running time: 68 minutes
- Country: Germany
- Language: German

A Door Opens (German: Eine Tür geht auf) is a 1933 German thriller film directed by Alfred Zeisler and starring Hermann Speelmans, Fritz Odemar and Oskar Sima. It was shot at the Babelsberg Studios of UFA in Berlin. The film's sets were designed by the art director Otto Hunte.

== Synopsis ==
After a bank robbery in which several hundred thousand reichsmarks are taken, a detective goes on the trail of the five perpetrators.

== Cast ==
- Erika Fiedler as Anni Schubert, Photographin
- Hermann Speelmans as Hans Braumüller
- Lily Rodien as Vera Bessel
- Fritz Odemar as Jonny Schlichting
- Oskar Sima as Franz Zengler
- Hans Deppe as Acki
- Peter Erkelenz as Julius Kloth
- Walter Steinbeck as Karl Bergmann, Bankier
- Curt Lucas as Martin Fichtner, sein Kompagnon
- Hansjoachim Büttner as Kurt Ritter, Bankkassier
- Ernst Pröckl as Diener bei Bergmann
- Hedy Krilla as Die Zimmervermieterin
- Paul Moleska as Müller, Wächter

== Bibliography ==
- Klaus, Ulrich J. Deutsche Tonfilme: Jahrgang 1933. Klaus-Archiv, 1988.
- Waldman, Harry. Nazi Films In America, 1933-1942. McFarland & Co, 2008.
