= There Is Only One Love =

1933 film

- Directed by: Johannes Meyer
- Written by: Georg C. Klaren; Hans Wilhelm
- Produced by: Vahayn Badal
- Starring: Louis Graveure; Heinz Rühmann; Ralph Arthur Roberts; Jenny Jugo
- Cinematography: Willy Winterstein
- Edited by: Else Baum
- Music by: Eduard Künneke
- Production company: Dr. von Badel-Film
- Distributed by: Deutsch Fox
- Release date: 16 November 1933
- Running time: 99 minutes
- Country: Germany
- Language: German

There Is Only One Love (German: Es gibt nur eine Liebe) is a 1933 German musical comedy film directed by Johannes Meyer and starring Louis Graveure, Heinz Rühmann, Ralph Arthur Roberts and Jenny Jugo. An operetta film, it was released in America in 1936. It was shot at the Babelsberg Studios in Berlin. The film's sets were designed by the art director Erich Czerwonski.

== Synopsis ==
Sir Henry Godwin, a celebrated Kammersänger, and his Ballet master Eddy decide to take a holiday in the Balkan Mountains. They encounter Dolores, a shorthand typist in the area on work, who falls in love Sir Henry while under the mistaken impression that he and Eddy are criminals on the run from the police.

== Cast ==
- Louis Graveure as Kammersänger Sir Henry Godwin
- Heinz Rühmann as Ballettmeister Eddy Blattner
- Ralph Arthur Roberts as Julius Wellenreiter
- Jenny Jugo as Dolores Müller
- Eva Eras as Lilly Montero
- Otto Stoeckel as Oberregisseur
- Martha Ziegler as Lina
- Bruno Ziener as Kapellmeister
- Margot Köchlin as Sängerin in der Oper
- Friedrich Ettel as Gefangenenwärter
- Willy Kaufman as Manager
- Ernst Rotmund as Schaffner
- Fred Immler as Polizeikommissar

== Bibliography ==
- Klaus, Ulrich J. Deutsche Tonfilme: Jahrgang 1933. Klaus-Archiv, 1988.
- Waldman, Harry. Nazi Films in America, 1933-1942. McFarland, 2008.
