= Marion, That's Not Nice =

1933 film

- Directed by: E. W. Emo
- Written by: Curt Siodmak; Charlie Roellinghoff (story); G. Jacobi (story)
- Starring: Magda Schneider; Hermann Thimig; Otto Wallburg
- Cinematography: Hugo von Kaweczynski
- Music by: Otto Stransky
- Production company: Itala Film
- Distributed by: Siegel-Monopolfilm
- Release date: 15 February 1933
- Running time: 82 minutes
- Country: Germany
- Language: German

Marion, That's Not Nice (German: Marion, das gehört sich nicht) is a 1933 German comedy film directed by E. W. Emo and starring Magda Schneider, Hermann Thimig, and Otto Wallburg. It was shot at the Johannisthal Studios in Berlin. A separate Italian-language version Model Wanted was made at the same time. The following year the film was remade in Britain as There Goes Susie.

== Synopsis ==
A soap tycoon is shocked to discover that the girl chosen as the model for his new advertising campaign is his own daughter.

== Cast ==
- Magda Schneider as Marion, Satorius Tochter
- Hermann Thimig as Kurt Bach, Kunstmaler
- Otto Wallburg as Direktor Satorius, Seifenfabrikant
- Julius Falkenstein as Brammel, sein Kammerdiener
- Elli Schmid as Hella, Marions Freundin
- Henry Bender as Oskar, Marions Onkel
- Erich Fiedler as Der 1.Reklamechef bei Satorius
- Theo Lingen as Der 2.Reklamechef bei Satorius
- Olly Gebauer as Das Mädel aus der Bar
- Eugen Rex as Der Gasmann

== Bibliography ==
- Klaus, Ulrich J. Deutsche Tonfilme: Jahrgang 1933. Klaus-Archiv, 1988.
- Parish, James Robert (1977). Film Actors Guide: Western Europe. Metuchen, NJ: Scarecrow Press. ISBN 978-0-8108-1044-0.
