= Johannes Meyer (director) =

German film director

- Born: 13 August 1888; Brieg, Silesia, German Empire
- Died: 25 January 1976 (aged 87); Marburg, Hesse, West Germany
- Occupations: Director, Writer
- Years active: 1921-1951 (film)

Johannes Meyer (13 August 1888 – 25 January 1976) was a German screenwriter and film director. He directed a number of films during the Weimar, Nazi and post-War eras, most notably Fridericus (1936), one in a series of epics about Frederick the Great.

== Selected filmography ==
- Horrido (1924)
- The Poacher (1926)
- Guilty (1928)
- High Treason (1929)
- The Blonde Nightingale (1930)
- The Rhineland Girl (1930)
- The Tiger Murder Case (1930)
- Ash Wednesday (1931)
- Alarm at Midnight (1931)
- I'll Stay with You (1931)
- Two Heavenly Blue Eyes (1932)
- Under False Flag (1932)
- Happy Days in Aranjuez (1933)
- The Little Crook (1933)
- There Is Only One Love (1933)
- Goodbye, Beautiful Days (1933)
- Black Fighter Johanna (1934)
- The Fugitive from Chicago (1934)
- The Legacy of Pretoria (1934)
- Fridericus (1937)
- Mystery About Beate (1938)
- Der singende Tor (1939)
- Marriage in Small Doses (1939)
- Voice of the Heart (1942)
- Wild Bird (1943)
- Rätsel der Nacht (1945)
- Blocked Signals (1948)
- I'll Never Forget That Night (1949)
- Furioso (1950)
- Thirteen Under One Hat (1950)

== Bibliography ==
- Richards, Jeffrey. Visions of Yesterday. Routledge & Kegan Paul, 1973.
- Taylor, Richard. Film propaganda: Soviet Russia and Nazi Germany. I.B. Tauris, 1998.
