= Hugo Fischer-Köppe =

German actor (1890–1937)

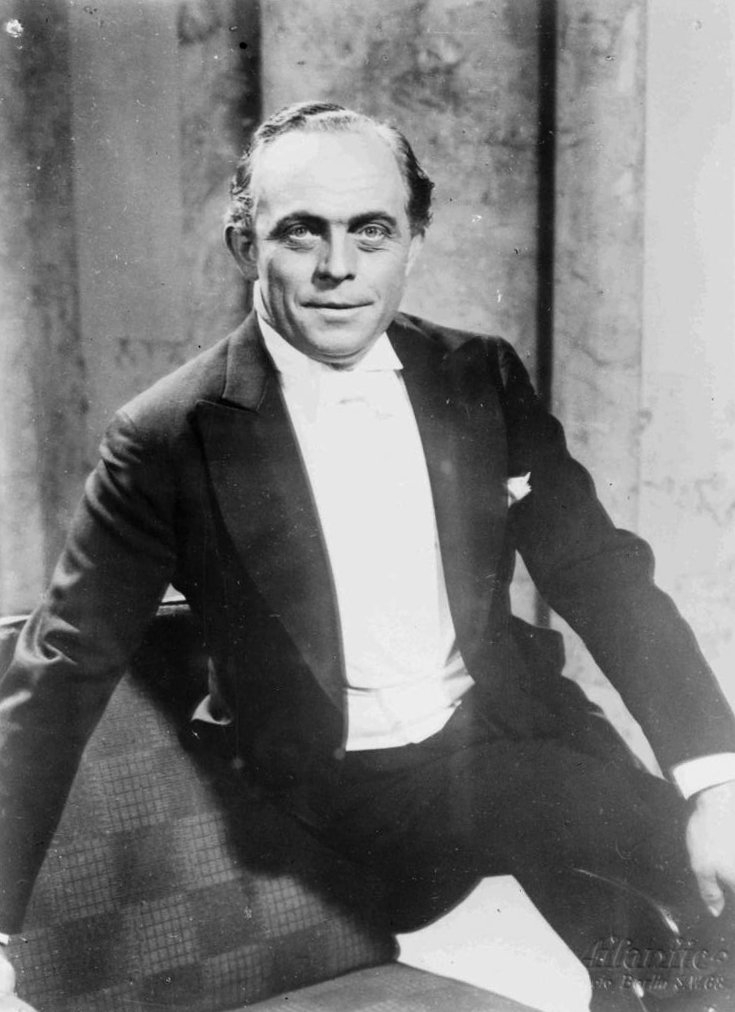
- Born: 13 February 1890; Bielefeld
- Died: December 31, 1937; Berlin
- Occupation: Actor
- Years active: 1913–1937

Hugo Fischer-Köppe (13 February 1890, in Bielefeld – 31 December 1937, in Berlin) was an early German film actor.

Fischer-Köppe entered film in 1917 and appeared in some 80 different films between 1913 and his premature death in 1937 in films such as Achtung! Auto-Diebe! in 1930 in which he worked with actor and director Harry Piel and Charly Berger.

== Selected filmography ==
- The Men of Frau Clarissa (1922)
- The Queen of Whitechapel (1922)
- The Shadows of That Night (1922)
- The Big Shot (1922)
- The Morals of the Alley (1925)
- Three Waiting Maids (1925)
- Oh Those Glorious Old Student Days (1925)
- War in Peace (1925)
- Ash Wednesday (1925)
- The Trumpets are Blowing (1926)
- The Captain from Koepenick (1926)
- The Last Horse Carriage in Berlin (1926)
- Countess Ironing-Maid (1926)
- The Armoured Vault (1926)
- The Man Without Sleep (1926)
- Maytime (1926)
- I Stand in the Dark Midnight (1927)
- Night of Mystery (1927)
- The Criminal of the Century (1928)
- Queen of Fashion (1929)
- Three Days Confined to Barracks (1930)
- Love in the Ring (1930)
- The Jumping Jack (1930)
- The Copper (1930)
- Gloria (1931)
- Grock (1931)
- Alarm at Midnight (1931)
- Wibbel the Tailor (1931)
- Who Takes Love Seriously? (1931)
- Duty Is Duty (1931)
- My Cousin from Warsaw (1931)
- Terror of the Garrison (1931)
- Checkmate (1931)
- Peace of Mind (1931)
- No Money Needed (1932)
- Spell of the Looking Glass (1932)
- The Blue of Heaven (1932)
- Madame Makes Her Exit (1932)
- The Dancer of Sanssouci (1932)
- Two Lucky Days (1932)
- Paprika (1932)
- Haunted People (1932)
- Two Good Comrades (1933)
- Bon Voyage (1933)
- Dream of the Rhine (1933)
- The Big Bluff (1933)
- Decoy (1934)
- A Girl Whirls By the World (1934)
- Police Report (1934)
- The Daring Swimmer (1934)
- Alarm in Peking (1937)
