= Typhoon (1933 film) =

1933 film directed by Robert Wiene

- Directed by: Robert Wiene
- Written by: Robert Wiene
- Based on: Typhoon by Melchior Lengyel
- Produced by: Adolf Noé; Robert Wiene
- Starring: Liane Haid; Viktor de Kowa; Valéry Inkijinoff; Veit Harlan
- Cinematography: Heinrich Gärtner
- Edited by: Carl Otto Bartning
- Music by: Stefan Rényi; Helmut Wolfes
- Production company: Camera-Filmproduktion
- Distributed by: Terra Film (Germany)
- Release dates: 25 August 1933 (Vienna, 1st version); 27 July 1934 (Berlin, 2nd version)
- Running time: 81/76 minutes
- Country: Germany
- Language: German

Typhoon (German: Taifun) is a 1933 German drama film directed by Robert Wiene and starring Liane Haid, Viktor de Kowa and Valéry Inkijinoff. It was based on the 1911 play Typhoon by the Hungarian writer Melchior Lengyel. It was the last German film made by Wiene, who had been a leading director of German silent cinema.

== Synopsis ==
A Japanese doctor, on a secret mission to Paris for his country, becomes romantically involved with a cabaret singer at a Parisian nightclub. His entire mission is put at risk when he kills a rival for her love, a French journalist and blackmailer.

== Production and release ==
The film was produced by Wiene's own independent production company and shot at the Marienfelde Studios of Terra Film in Berlin. The film's sets were designed by the art director Arthur Schwarz. It was made around the time of the changeover from the Weimar Republic to Nazi Germany. In Germany the film was banned for several reasons, particularly what was perceived as the unflattering portrayal of Europeans in contrast to the noble Asian characters. The censors were also concerned that the incompetence of the French justice system would be taken by audiences to mean the German one, undermining their faith in it.

The film had its debut in the Austrian capital Vienna. It was later released heavily re-shot under the alternative title Polizeiakte 909. The new version dramatically altered its plot from the original and the Japanese are now portrayed as unsympathetic villains. The new version was approved by German censors and released in 1934 although its critical reception was poor. It is possible that Wiene, who had left for Budapest in 1933 following the Nazi rise to power, did not personally work on the new version.

== Cast ==
- Liane Haid as Helene Laroche
- Viktor de Kowa as Charles Renard-Brinski
- Valéry Inkijinoff as Doctor Nitobe Tokeramo
- Veit Harlan as Inose Hironari
- Arthur Bergen as Yoshikawa
- Paul Mederow as Vorsitzender
- Bernhard Goetzke as Prosecutor
- Paul Henckels as Defense lawyer
- Josef Dahmen as Werkdetektiv
- Friedrich Ettel as Kriminalrat Morre

== See also ==
- The Typhoon (1914)

== Bibliography ==
- Jung, Uli & Schatzberg, Walter. Beyond Caligari: The Films of Robert Wiene. Berghahn Books, 1999.
