= Heinrich George =

German actor (1893–1946)

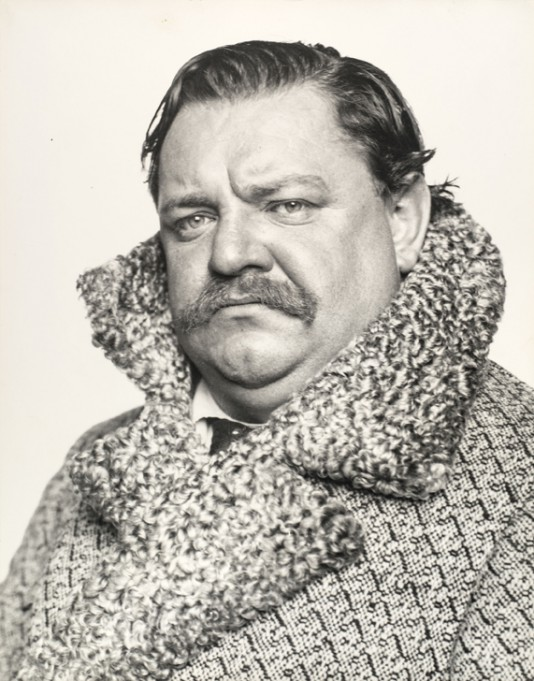
- Publicity portrait by Hugo Erfurth, 1930
- Born: Georg August Friedrich Hermann Schulz; 9 October 1893; Stettin, German Empire
- Died: 25 September 1946 (aged 52); Sachsenhausen, Soviet occupation zone in Germany
- Occupation: Actor
- Years active: 1912–1945
- Spouse: Berta Drews
- Children: 2, including Götz George

Georg August Friedrich Hermann Schulz (9 October 1893 – 25 September 1946), better known as Heinrich George (German: [ˈhaɪnʁɪç ɡeˈ(ʔ)ɔʁɡə]), was a German stage and film actor.

== Early life ==
George was born in Pomerania to August Friedrich Schulz, a former Deck Officer in the Imperial German Navy, and Anna Auguste Wilhelmine Glander. He had one older brother. He did not complete school, but instead took acting classes in Stettin. In 1912, he made his stage debut in a production of Die keusche Susanne playing the head waiter. His acting career was interrupted by the advent of World War I. He volunteered to fight and was seriously wounded in 1915.

== Career ==
=== Weimar Republic ===
After the war, George worked at the Albert Theatre in Dresden and the Schauspiel Frankfurt. He appeared in a production of Oskar Kokoschka's Hiob in Frankfurt which ended up with the audience rioting due to the appearance of a naked woman onstage. In 1921, he moved to Berlin to work at the Deutsches Theater. The same year, he appeared in his first film, Der Roman der Christine von Herre by director Ludwig Berger.

George is noted for having spooked the young Bertolt Brecht in his first directing job, a production of Arnolt Bronnen's Parricide (1922), when he refused to continue working with the director.

In 1923 he founded the Schauspielertheater with fellow actors Elisabeth Bergner and Alexander Granach in order to be able to work more independently as an artist. From 1925 to 1929 he appeared primarily onstage at the Volksbühne. From 1926 to 1938 he also appeared regularly at the Heidelberg Festival.

He appeared in Fritz Lang's Metropolis (1927) and Dreyfus (1930), as well as starring in Berlin Alexanderplatz (1931).

In 1929, George organized a memorial service for his friend and colleague Albert Steinrück at the Staatstheater in Gendarmenmarkt. The purpose of the event was to ensure that Steinrück's descendants made a living through the sale of Steinrück's paintings which were exhibited in the theater.

George was an active member of the Communist party during the Weimar Republic. He worked with theatre director Erwin Piscator and playwright Bertolt Brecht, both of whom identified with the political left.

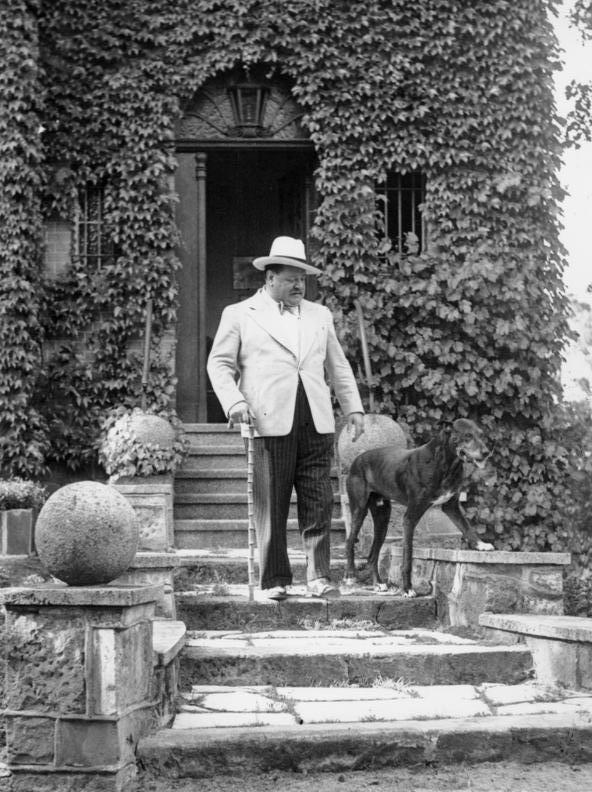
George in front of his house at Bismarckstraße 34 in Wannsee-Berlin with his mastiff Fellow in 1930

On 12 October 1932, he changed his legal name to his stage name George.

=== Nazi era ===
After the Nazi takeover, George was classified as a "non-desirable" actor at first because of his earlier political affiliations and was thus barred from working in cinematic productions. However, he was eventually able to reach an accommodation with the Nazi regime. In 1937, George was designated as a Staatsschauspieler (i.e. an actor of national importance) and in 1938 was appointed director of the Schiller Theater in Berlin. As director, he hired artists who were considered "non-desirable" including the art historian Wilhelm Fraenger (a communist), the Catholic actor Robert Müller, and the graphic artist Karl Rössing (a communist who converted to the NSDAP) and his student Günther Strupp. George actively collaborated with the Nazis and agreed to star in Nazi propaganda films such as Hitler Youth Quex (1933), Jud Süß (1940), and Kolberg (1945) as well as appearing in numerous newsreels.

George had a stocky build and a Berlin accent which made him readily recognizable to German audiences. George's prestige as a leading actor of the day made him an "extraordinarily valuable catch for the Nazis." Cooke and Silberman describe him as "the actor most closely tied with fascist fantasies of the autocratic and the populist leader".

On the occasion of his 50th birthday, Adolf Hitler awarded George the title of Generalintendant. Joseph Goebbels personally presented George with a portrait of Hitler to commemorate the event.

After firebombs severely damaged the Schiller Theater in September 1943, Goebbels presented him with a Verdienstkreuz 2. Klasse (Cross of Merit, 2nd Class) for helping to extinguish the fire.

== Postwar ==
On 14 May 1945, according to his wife, George was arrested for the first time by Soviet officers with the words "He won't stay long" and was released the next day. He was given meat and wine for his family. A week later he was imprisoned again for one day, and on 26 May for the third time for five days. He is said to have told his interrogators "Please shoot me" and his wife reported in her memoirs (1956/1986) that he said:

"They should take away everything I have, starve me and humiliate me. But if they forbid me to act, I will die".

On 31 May, George received a certificate from the mayor of Charlottenburg stating that he was not allowed to be involved in clean-up work "as he must be available to the authorities for questioning at any time". In the beginning of June, the Soviet city commander for Berlin Nikolai Berzarin issued him a letter of protection which appeared in his KGB file as a "passport" confiscated during his last arrest. George was arrested again, after the death of Berzarin on 16 June, when his motorcycle collided with a truck convoy near his office in Berlin-Friedrichsfelde.

George's KGB file includes an undated report from five informers, three of them with legible signatures. The letter states: "Just 14 days before the Red Army liberated us from the Nazi yoke, he made himself available to the NSDAP and tried to incite Berliners to active resistance in the form of a call in the Berlin press. The entire German people can stand as a witness against George. If George were put on any German stage, in our opinion he would be lynched."

A Lieutenant Bibler reported to his boss Pyrin on 28 July 1945 that George was “one of the most respected fascist artists" who "contributed to the continuation of the war through his pro-fascist agitation in radio and newspapers". The day before, Bibler's Soviet colleague had ordered George's transfer to the NKVD special camp in Hohenschönhausen, citing NKVD Order No. 0016 of 11 January 1945.

George managed to set up a prison theater at the camp and put on a production of Faust. His wife was allowed to speak to him at the gate once a week for five minutes and also bring him textbooks and music. On 6 December he was allowed to hug his son Götz; it was the last time his wife saw him. In February 1946, communist writer Friedrich Wolf (the father of the later Stasi head Markus Wolf) tried to facilitate George's release; other attempts by his theater friends to get him released were unsuccessful.

George was transferred to the NKVD special camp Nr. 7 in Sachsenhausen. According to a fellow prisoner, George continued to perform at the camp in front of 12,000 prisoners and the Soviet guards.

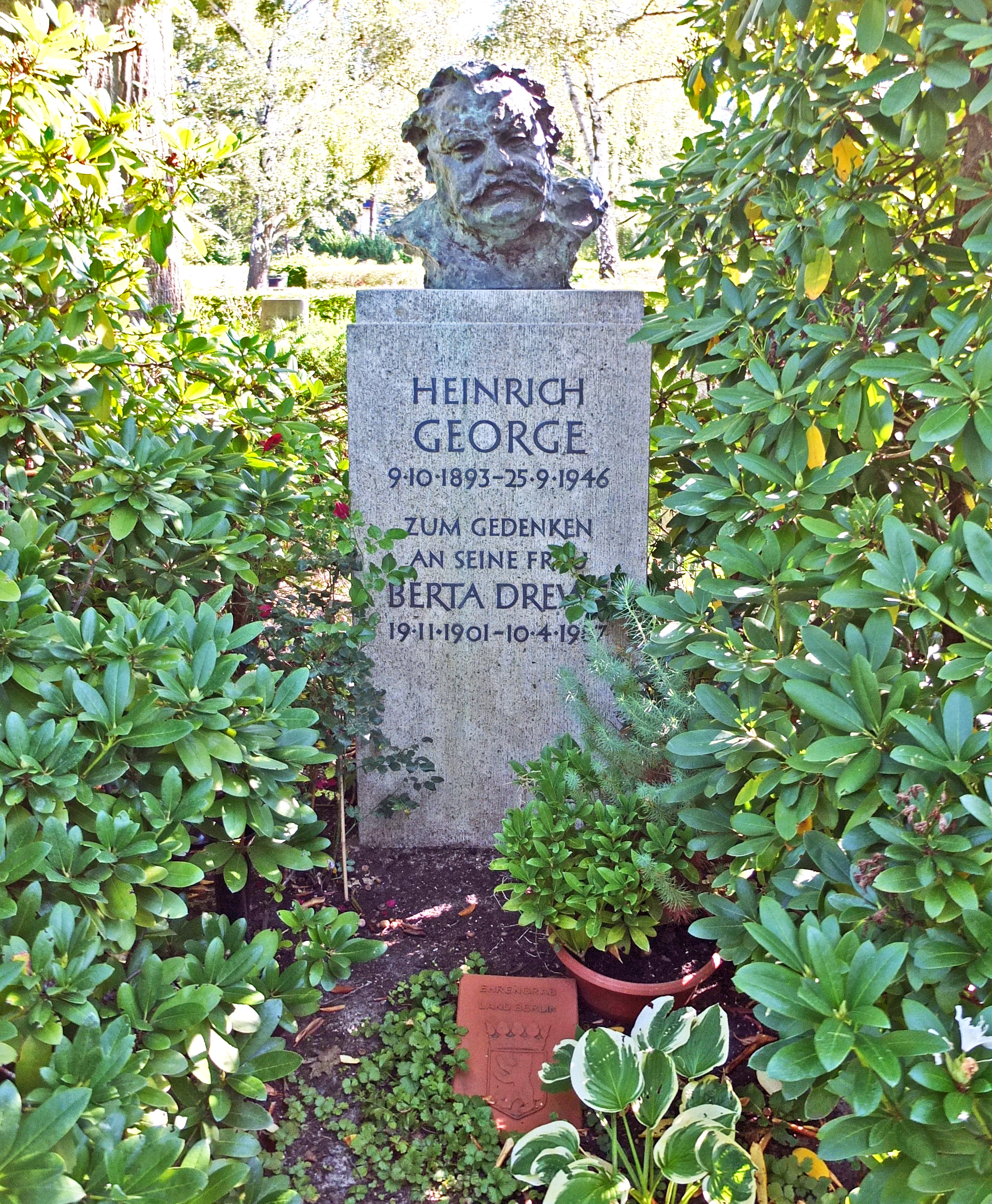
Grave of George at the Zehlendorf Cemetery in Berlin

The once massive man lost weight rapidly - a record from February 1946 documented a weight loss of 80 pounds (40 kilograms) - and was now completely exhausted. On 22 September, during preliminary rehearsals for a dramatization of the ballad Death of Tiberius, George went to the internal medicine outpatient clinic, according to a fellow prisoner. The examining doctor diagnosed appendicitis. The next morning he was taken to the hospital on a stretcher by the paramedics. As a result of the appendix operation, George died on 25 September 1946. The death certificate, signed by Soviet and German doctors, shows the diagnosis as "laparotomy, bronchopneumonia, cardiac atrophy." The cause of death is given as "bronchopneumonia and heart failure". However, his cause of his death may have been starvation, despite official reports.

Through the intercession of one of the camp staff who admired his acting, George was buried in an individual grave at the camp rather than in the customary mass grave. According to a fellow prisoner, his bones were found in an overgrown forest near Sachsenhausen in 1994. The remains were identified using DNA from his two sons and his body was moved to Berlin to the Zehlendorf Cemetery. His tombstone is topped by a bronze bust and an inscription commemorating his wife who died in 1987. In 1995, the Senate of Berlin declared the grave an Ehrengrab des Landes Berlin (Honorary Grave).

== Personal life ==
In 1930, George was playing the role of Götz von Berlichingen in the play of the same name and needed to find an actress to play Adelheid von Walldorf. Ernst Legal suggested actress Berta Drews for the role based on her work as Adelhaid at Reinhardt-Schule. The couple's first child Jan George was born the following year and they were married in 1933. They had a second son in 1938 who was named Götz George after his father's character. Götz became an actor while Jan George worked as a photographer.

== Filmography ==
- The Story of Christine von Herre (1921) as Count Dieter Von Herre
- Lady Hamilton (1921) as Capitain John Willett Payne
- Kean (1921) as Edmund Kean
- The Pearls of Lady Harrison (1922)
- Lucrezia Borgia (1922) as Sebastiano
- The Frankish Song (1922)
- Lola Montez, the King's Dancer (1922) as Don Miguel
- Earth Spirit (1923) as Rodrigo
- Fridericus Rex Part 4 (1923) as Prince Charles Alexander of Lorraine
- The Sun of St. Moritz (1923)
- Man by the Wayside (1923) as a landlord
- Quarantine (1923)
- Steuerlos (1924)
- Debit and Credit (1924) as Hippus
- Zwischen Morgen und Morgen (1924)
- She (1925) as Horace Holly
- Mirakel der Liebe (1925)
- Metropolis (1926) as Grot
- The Armoured Vault (1926) as Cracker
- Superfluous People (1926) as Balagula
- Wrath of the Seas (1926) as Röwer
- The Sea (1927) as Yann
- Orient Express (1927) as Peter Karg
- Bigamie (1927) as Otto Engel
- Die Ausgestoßenen (1927)
- The Serfs (1928) as Nikita the gamekeeper
- The Lady with the Mask (1928) as Otto Hanke
- Song (1928) as Jack Houben
- Theatre (1928) as Stroganoff
- The Last Fort (1928) as Croff
- Whirl of Youth (1928) as Jig Hartford
- Manolescu (1929) as Jack
- Children of the Street (1929)
- The Man with the Frog (1929) as The Man with the Frog
- The Convict from Istanbul (1929) as Thomas Zezi
- Explosives Excavator 1010 (1929) as Director March
- Dreyfus (1930) as Emile Zola
- The Other (1930) as Dickert
- Menschen im Käfig (1930) as Cass
- The Man Who Murdered (1931) as Lord Fackland
- 1914 (1931) as Jean Jaurès
- Berlin Alexanderplatz (1931) as Franz Biberkopf
- Men Behind Bars (1931) as Butch
- Wir schalten um auf Hollywood (1931)
- Goethe lebt …! (1931)
- Tugboat M 17 (1933, also director) as Henner
- Hitlerjunge Quex (1933) as Mr. Volker
- The Lake Calls (1933) as Terje Wiggen
- Ripening Youth (1933) as Brodersen
- Hermine and the Seven Upright Men (1934) as Fryman
- Joan of Arc (1935) as Philip the Good
- A Night of Change (1935) as Boris Pettkof
- Pillars of Society (1935)
- Die große und die kleine Welt (1936)
- When the Cock Crows (1936)
- Stjenka Rasin (1936)
- Ball at the Metropol (1937)
- Don't Promise Me Anything (1937) as Felder
- Unternehmen Michael (1937) as General Commander
- An Enemy of the People (1937) as Doctor Hans Stockmann
- The Beaver Coat (1937) as Baron von Wehrhahn
- Frau Sylvelin (1938)
- The Stars Shine (1938) as himself
- Heimat (1938) as Leopold Dall'Orto Schwartze
- The Immortal Heart (1939) as Peter Henlein
- The Sensational Casilla Trial (1939) as Vandegrift
- Der Postmeister (1940) as The Postmaster
- Jud Süß (1940) as Duke Karl Alexander
- Friedrich Schiller –The Triumph of a Genius (1940) as Duke Charles Eugene
- Pedro Will Hang (1941) as Manuel
- Destiny (1942) as Stephan Ratikin
- Wedding in Barenhof (1942) as Baron van Hanke
- Vienna 1910 (1942) as Georg Ritter von Schönerer
- Der große Schatten (1942)
- Andreas Schlüter (1942) as Andreas Schlüter
- Der Verteidiger hat das Wort (1944)
- The Degenhardts (1944) as Karl Degenhardt
- Kolberg (1945) as Joachim Nettlebeck
- Anna Alt (1945)
- Frau über Bord (1945)
- Das Leben geht weiter (1945, unfinished)
- Dr. phil. Döderlein (1945, unfinished)
