= Käthe Haack =

German actress (1897–1986)

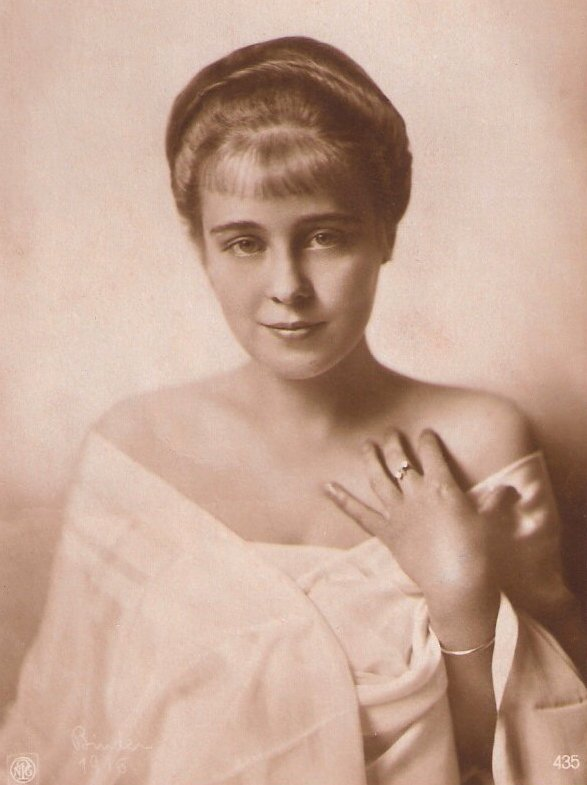
- Born: Käte Lisbeth Minna Sophie Isolde Haack; 11 August 1897; Berlin, German Empire
- Died: 5 May 1986 (aged 88); West Berlin, West Germany
- Resting place: Friedhof Heerstraße, Berlin-Westend
- Occupation: Actress
- Years active: 1914–1985
- Spouse: Heinrich Schroth (m. 1922; died 1945)
- Children: Hannelore Schroth

Käthe Haack (born Käte Lisbeth Minna Sophie Isolde Haack; 11 August 1897 – 5 May 1986) was a German stage and film actress. She appeared in more than 200 films and 30 television productions between 1915 and 1985.

== Life and career ==
Käte Lisbeth Minna Sophie Isolde Haack was born in Berlin on 11 August 1897. After finishing school education, Haack had her first engagement as an actress in Göttingen. Since 1915, she regularly appeared in Berlin theatres like Theater am Schiffbauerdamm, Volksbühne and Deutsches Theater. Between 1934 and 1945, she worked at the Konzerthaus Berlin under direction of Gustaf Gründgens. She also appeared in the original production of The Captain of Köpenick. Haack remained in demand as a stage actress for the rest of her life, for example as Mrs. Higgins in My Fair Lady during the 1960s.

Haack started her film career as early as 1915 with the Max Mack's silent film Der Katzensteg. She was initially cast as Lola-Lola in the film The Blue Angel (1930) and her contract was signed, but she was ultimately replaced by Marlene Dietrich. She mostly played love interests during the silent era, later she successfully transitioned to character roles as a mother, wife, grandmother or wealthy lady. Among her best-known film roles is Baronin Münchhausen in Münchhausen (1943), an expensive film adaption about Baron Munchausen starring Hans Albers. She also appeared in Emil and the Detectives (1931), No Greater Love (1952) and The Last Pedestrian (1960). Haack played her last role in the television series Ein Heim für Tiere in 1985, 70 years after her film career had started.

She was married to actor Heinrich Schroth from 1922 until his death in 1945. They had one child together, actress Hannelore Schroth, who was born in 1922.

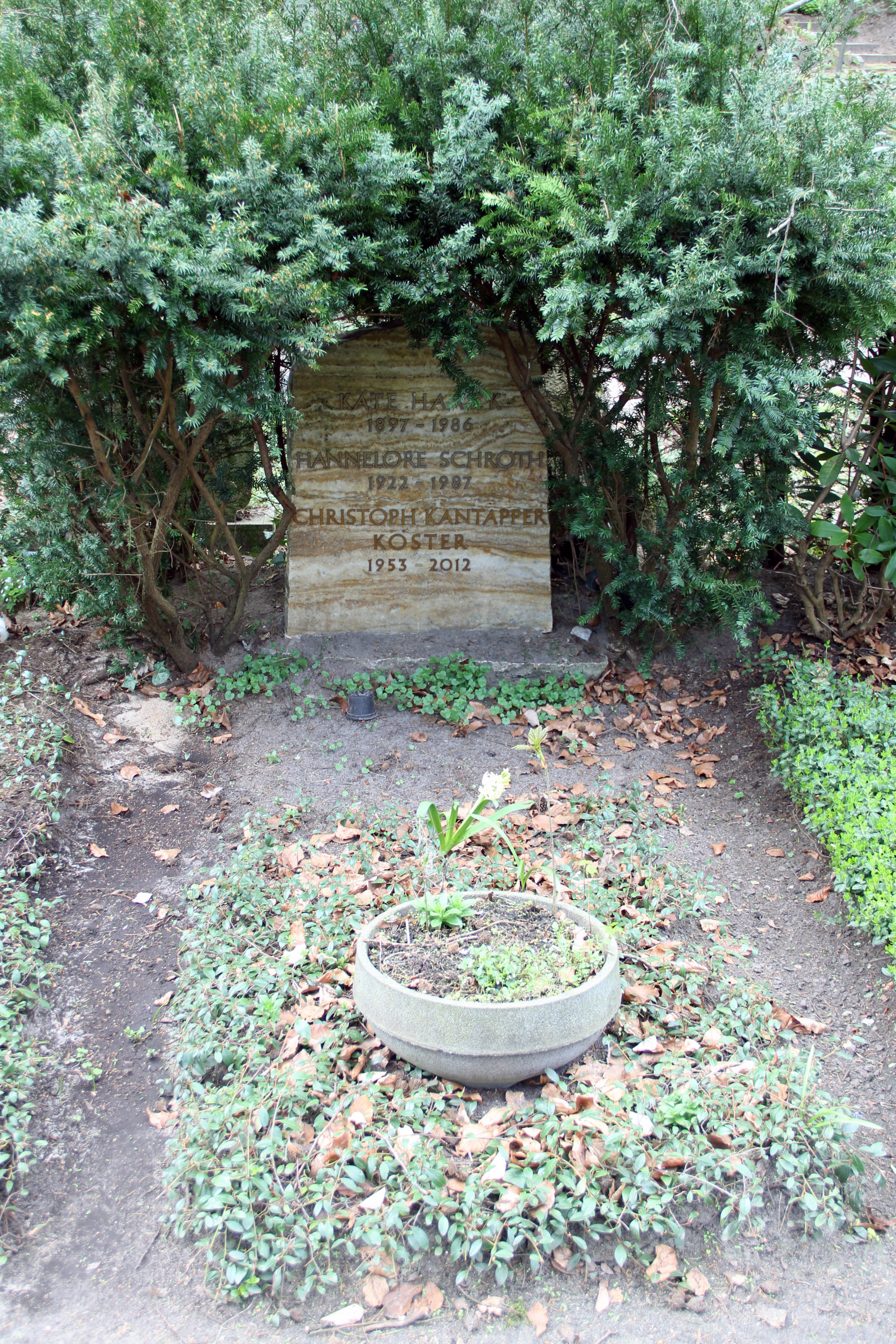
Gravesite of Haack, her daughter Hannelore Schroth, and grandson Christopher Kantapper Köster in Berlin-Westend

Käthe Haack died in West Berlin in May 1986 at the age of 88. The burial took place at the state-owned Friedhof Heerstraße in today's district of Berlin-Westend. The daughter Hannelore Schroth was already buried at her side the following year, as was later her son from her third marriage, Christoph Kantapper Köster (1953-2012). By decision of the Berlin Senate, the final resting place of Käthe Haack (grave location: 16-J-27) has been dedicated as an honorary grave of the State of Berlin since 2018. The dedication is valid for the usual period of twenty years, but can be extended afterwards.

== Selected filmography ==
- The Knitting Needles (1916)
- Dr. Hart's Diary (1917)
- Wedding in the Eccentric Club (1917)
- The Rat (1918)
- Your Big Secret (1918)
- The Son of Hannibal (1918)
- Lorenzo Burghardt (1918)
- The Gambler (1919)
- Algol (1920)
- Demon Blood (1920)
- The Yellow Diplomat (1920)
- The Drums of Asia (1921)
- The Love Nest (1922)
- Youth (1922)
- William Tell (1923)
- The Sensational Trial (1923)
- My Leopold (1924)
- Hedda Gabler (1925)
- Leap Into Life (1924)
- Living Buddhas (1925)
- The Marriage Swindler (1925)
- Children of No Importance (1926)
- Wrath of the Seas (1926)
- People to Each Other (1926)
- Sister Veronika (1927)
- Benno Stehkragen (1927)
- The Catwalk (1927)
- Under the Lantern (1928)
- Scandalous Eva (1930)
- Alraune (1930)
- Berlin-Alexanderplatz (1931)
- The Captain from Köpenick (1931)
- Emil and the Detectives (1931)
- Tannenberg (1932)
- Night Convoy (1932)
- The Beautiful Adventure (1932)
- Quick (1932)
- Two Lucky Days (1932)
- Love Must Be Understood (1933)
- The Gentleman from Maxim's (1933)
- Dream of the Rhine (1933)
- The Black Whale (1934)
- Financial Opportunists (1934)
- Police Report (1934)
- Hearts are Trumps (1934)
- The Four Musketeers (1934)
- William Tell (1934)
- Pygmalion (1935)
- The Foolish Virgin (1935)
- Miracle of Flight (1935)
- The Schimeck Family (1935)
- Thunder, Lightning and Sunshine (1936)
- Family Parade (1936)
- The Haunted Castle (1936)
- A Woman of No Importance (1936)
- The Ruler (1937)
- The Deruga Case (1938)
- The Day After the Divorce (1938)
- Mystery About Beate (1938)
- The False Step (1939)
- Ursula Under Suspicion (1939)
- Annelie (1941)
- Six Days of Leave (1941)
- Two in a Big City (1942)
- Münchhausen (1943)
- Wild Bird (1943)
- Sophienlund (1943)
- Love Letters (1944)
- And If We Should Meet Again (1947)
- Dangerous Guests (1949)
- An Everyday Story (1948)
- Keepers of the Night (1949)
- The Great Mandarin (1949)
- The Appeal to Conscience (1949)
- The Beaver Coat (1949)
- Gabriela (1950)
- The Girl from the South Seas (1950)
- Unknown Sender (1950)
- Furioso (1950)
- Queen of the Night (1951)
- Maya of the Seven Veils (1951)
- When the Evening Bells Ring (1951)
- My Friend the Thief (1951)
- No Greater Love (1952)
- The Smugglers' Banquet (1952)
- Shooting Stars (1952)
- Homesick for You (1952)
- The Prince of Pappenheim (1952)
- The Day Before the Wedding (1952)
- I'm Waiting for You (1952)
- We'll Talk About Love Later (1953)
- Everything for Father (1953)
- Rose-Girl Resli (1954)
- The Great Lola (1954)
- The Seven Dresses of Katrin (1954)
- Fireworks (1954)
- Homesick for Germany (1954)
- The Country Schoolmaster (1954)
- One Woman Is Not Enough? (1955)
- Heaven Is Never Booked Up (1955)
- I'll See You at Lake Constance (1956)
- Like Once Lili Marleen (1956)
- The Big Chance (1957)
- Adorable Arabella (1959)
- The Last Pedestrian (1960)
- Death and Diamonds (1968)
- Our Doctor is the Best (1969)
- The Pedestrian (1973)
- Grete Minde (1977)
- Iron Gustav (1979)
