= Walter Steinbeck =

German actor

- Born: 26 September 1878; Niederlößnitz, German Empire
- Died: 27 August 1942 (aged 63); Berlin, Nazi Germany
- Occupation: Actor

Walter Steinbeck (26 September 1878 – 27 August 1942) was a German film actor.

Steinbeck was born in Niederlößnitz (now Radebeul), Saxony, Germany. He died at age 63 in Berlin, Germany.

== Selected filmography ==
- The Romance of a Poor Sinner (1922)
- The Chain Clinks (1923)
- Night of Mystery (1927)
- Panic (1928)
- Sixteen Daughters and No Father (1928)
- The Great Longing (1930) - film director
- Her Majesty the Barmaid (1931)
- Marriage with Limited Liability (1931)
- Weekend in Paradise (1931)
- 24 Hours in the Life of a Woman (1931)
- Louise, Queen of Prussia (1931)
- In the Employ of the Secret Service (1931)
- Cadets (1931)
- Thea Roland (1932)
- Impossible Love (1932)
- The Blue of Heaven (1932)
- A Tremendously Rich Man (1932)
- Johnny Steals Europe (1932)
- The Mad Bomberg (1932)
- All is at Stake (1932)
- When Love Sets the Fashion (1932)
- Five from the Jazz Band (1932)
- Trenck (1932)
- Chauffeur Antoinette (1932)
- The Pride of Company Three (1932)
- The Page from the Dalmasse Hotel (1933)
- The House of Dora Green (1933)
- A Door Opens (1933)
- Laughing Heirs (1933)
- Dream of the Rhine (1933)
- Her Highness the Saleswoman (1933)
- Love Must Be Understood (1933)
- Gretel Wins First Prize (1933)
- The Big Bluff (1933)
- The Country Schoolmaster (1933)
- Gold (1934)
- Financial Opportunists (1934)
- The Brenken Case (1934)
- Holiday From Myself (1934)
- The Two Seals (1934)
- Police Report (1934)
- The Last Waltz (1934)
- Mother and Child (1934)
- Winter Night's Dream (1935)
- The Old and the Young King (1935)
- The Man with the Paw (1935)
- She and the Three (1935)
- His Late Excellency (1935)
- Dreams of Love (1935)
- Dinner Is Served (1936)
- Doctor Engel (1936)
- Love's Awakening (1936)
- Paul and Pauline (1936)
- The Haunted Castle (1936)
- The Night With the Emperor (1936)
- Hilde and the Volkswagen (1936)
- The Empress's Favourite (1936)
- The Dreamer (1936)
- Premiere (1937)
- The Glass Ball (1937)
- Autobus S (1937)
- The Coral Princess (1937)
- Monika (1938)
- The Great and the Little Love (1938)
- Freight from Baltimore (1938)
- The Holm Murder Case (1938)
- Nanon (1938)
- Mystery About Beate (1938)
- Two Women (1938)
- Red Orchids (1938)
- Der singende Tor (1939)
- In the Name of the People (1939)
- Charivan (1941)
- Gasman (1941)
- Illusion (1941)
- The Thing About Styx (1942)
- The Night in Venice (1942)
- Bismarck's Dismissal (1942)
- Wedding in Barenhof (1942)
- The Dark Day (1943)
- Titanic (1943)

== Bibliography ==
- Gemünden, Gerd. A Foreign Affair: Billy Wilder's American Films. Berghahn Books, 2008.
