= Chatin =

Chatin can be a masculine given name or a surname. Notable people with the name include:

== Given name ==
- Chatin Sarachi, Albanian painter and politician
- Chatin Singh Samaon, Indian politician

== Surname ==
- Gaspard Adolphe Chatin
- Joannes Charles Melchior Chatin (1847–1912), French botanist and zoologist
- Paul-Loup Chatin, French racing driver

== See also ==
- Châtin, commune in Nièvre, France
- Henri Chatin-Hofmann (1900–1961), American dancer
