= Science fiction set in 1920 =

Science fiction works set in the year 1920

This is a list of science fiction works set in 1920. It covers works published before 1920 that used the year as a near-future setting, works published in 1920 whose action is contemporaneous with publication, and later works that return to 1920. Inclusion is limited to works of science fiction for which a published source identifies 1920 as the setting, wholly or in part. Works merely set in the 1920s without a specified year are excluded.

== List ==
Work	Form	Published	Setting	Notes
The Repairer of Reputations	Short story	1895	1920	Published in The King in Yellow. Narrated by Hildred Castaigne in a New York City of 1920 that follows a near-future war with Germany and the legalisation of suicide, with the first Government Lethal Chamber opened on Washington Square. The narrator is unreliable and the reality of the setting is disputed.
Algol: Tragedy of Power	Film	1920	1920–c. 1940	German silent film directed by Hans Werckmeister. The miner Robert Herne obtains a machine producing unlimited energy from an inhabitant of the star Algol; the action opens in the present day of production and extends over the following two decades.
The Comet	Short story	1920	1920 (Note: The story does not name a year. Sources place its action in the Manhattan contemporaneous with the collection's 1920 publication.)	Published as the final chapter of Darkwater: Voices from Within the Veil. A comet strike releases gases that appear to kill everyone in New York but a Black bank messenger and a wealthy white woman.
Blink	Television episode	2007	1920 (in part)	Doctor Who. Kathy Nightingale is displaced to 1920 by a Weeping Angel and lives out the rest of her life there.
The Mouthless Dead	Audio drama	2016	November 1920	Doctor Who: The Companion Chronicles 10.1, by John Pritchard. The TARDIS arrives beside an English railway line on the eve of the funeral of the Unknown Warrior.

== See also ==
- 1920 in science fiction
- List of stories set in a future now in the past
