= Ship in Distress (1925 film) =

1925 film

- Directed by: Fred Sauer
- Written by: Walter Jonas; Theo E. Sönnichsen
- Starring: Gustav Fröhlich; Jenny Jugo
- Cinematography: Werner Bohne; Giovanni Vitrotti
- Production company: Phoebus Film
- Distributed by: Phoebus Film; UFA
- Release date: 4 November 1925
- Running time: 95 minutes
- Country: Germany
- Languages: Silent; German intertitles

Ship in Distress (German: Schiff in Not) is a 1925 German silent drama film directed by Fred Sauer and starring Gustav Fröhlich and Jenny Jugo.

The film's sets were designed by the art director Willi Herrmann. It premiered at the Marmorhaus in Berlin.

== Cast ==
- Gustav Fröhlich as Harry Petersen
- Fritz Alberti as Ludwig Hartner, Reeder
- Rudolf Del Zopp as der alte Uhl
- Harry Hardt
- Jenny Jugo as Blanche Godard
- Frieda Lehndorf as Mutter Hansen
- Philipp Manning as Ole Hansen
- Grete Reinwald as Dörte Hansen
- Hans Adalbert Schlettow as Pieter Hansen
- Gyula Szőreghy as Bankier Brandes

== Bibliography ==
- Alfred Krautz. International directory of cinematographers, set- and costume designers in film, Volume 4. Saur, 1984.
