= Peer Gynt (1919 film) =

- Directed by: Victor Barnowsky; Richard Oswald
- Written by: Henrik Ibsen (play)
- Produced by: Richard Oswald
- Starring: Heinz Salfner; Ilka Grüning; Lina Lossen; Conrad Veidt
- Production company: Richard-Oswald-Produktion
- Release date: 6 April 1919
- Country: Germany
- Languages: Silent; German intertitles

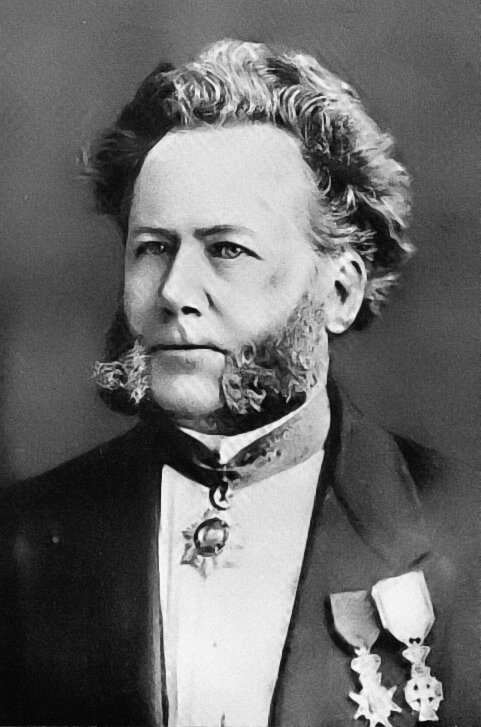
Henrik Ibsen (1870, Dresden)

Peer Gynt is a 1919 German silent film directed by Victor Barnowsky and Richard Oswald and starring Heinz Salfner, Ilka Grüning and Lina Lossen. It is based upon the play by Henrik Ibsen.

== Cast ==
- Heinz Salfner as Peer Gynt
- Ilka Grüning as Aase
- Lina Lossen as Solveig
- Hans Sternberg as Jon Gynt
- Georg John as Prof. Dr. Begriffenfeldt
- John Gottowt as der Dovre-Alte
- Irmgard von Hansen as Ingrid
- Maria Forescu as Die Grüngekleidete
- Conrad Veidt as Ein fremder Passagier
- Hanna Lierke as Anitra
- Richard Senius
- Gertrud von Hoschek
- Anita Berber

== Bibliography ==
- John T. Soister. Conrad Veidt on Screen: A Comprehensive Illustrated Filmography. McFarland, 2002.
