= Single Mother =

Single Mother or Single Mothers may refer to:

- single mother, a female single parent
- Single Mother (film), a 1928 German silent film
- Single Mothers (album), by Justin Townes Earle, 2014
- Single Mothers (band), a Canadian punk rock band

== See also ==
- Single Father (disambiguation)
- SMILF, an American TV sitcom
