= He Goes Right, She Goes Left! =

1928 film

- Directed by: Fred Sauer
- Written by: Fred Sauer; Walter Wassermann
- Produced by: Josef Stein
- Starring: Livio Pavanelli; Lotte Neumann; Georg Alexander
- Cinematography: Arpad Viragh
- Production company: Kosmos-Film
- Release date: 30 March 1928
- Country: Germany
- Languages: Silent; German intertitles

He Goes Right, She Goes Left! (German: Er geht rechts - Sie geht links!) is a 1928 German silent romance film directed by Fred Sauer and starring Livio Pavanelli, Lotte Neumann, and Georg Alexander.

The film's sets were designed by the art director Kurt Richter.

== Cast ==
- Livio Pavanelli as Professor Dr. George Miller
- Lotte Neumann as Claire
- Georg Alexander as Hugo v. Langen
- Adolphe Engers as Karl
- Hilde Maroff as Lissy
- Carla Bartheel as Valerie de Costa
- Helene von Bolváry as Baronin Kleeberg
- Ellen Plessow as Armanda Primel

== Bibliography ==
- Gerhard Lamprecht. Deutsche Stummfilme: 1927–1931.
