= Come to Vienna, I'll Show You Something! =

1970 film

- Theatrical film poster
- German: Komm nach Wien, ich zeig dir was!
- Directed by: Rolf Thiele
- Written by: Joachim Fernau; Rolf Thiele
- Produced by: Otto Dürer
- Starring: Tanja Gruber; Veit Relin; Andrea Rau
- Cinematography: Wolf Wirth
- Edited by: Inga Sauer
- Music by: Bernd Kampka
- Production companies: Terra-Filmkunst; Vienna-Filmproduktion
- Distributed by: Constantin Film
- Release date: 6 February 1970
- Running time: 83 minutes
- Countries: Austria; West Germany
- Language: German

Come to Vienna, I'll Show You Something! (German: Komm nach Wien, ich zeig dir was!) is a 1970 Austrian-West German comedy film directed by Rolf Thiele and starring Tanja Gruber, Veit Relin, and Andrea Rau. As a sex comedy, it presents several events in the history of Vienna.

== Main cast ==
- Dietmar Schönherr as Narrator
- Tanja Gruber as Helene Kottanerin
- Veit Relin as Fürst Metternich
- Andrea Rau as Bubula / Nubierin / Weinberg-Mizzi
- Peter Kollek as Herzog Friedrich II, der Streitbare
- Julia Holt as Bruni
- Achim Hammer as Adolf Hitler
- Kitty Kino as Mizzi at Adolf Hitler
- Jürgen Draeger as Makart, painter
- Sonja Bohuslav as Mizzi Kolschitzky
- Tilo von Berlepsch as Talleyrand
- Inken Sommer as Countess Zichy
- Peter Hohberger as Mutius
- Suzanne Geyer as Königin Elizabeth
- Bernd Kampka as Tannhäuser
- Inge Toifl as Baronin
- Kurt Strauss as Friedrich VI von Dänemark
- Francy Fair as Gabrielle, Countess Auersberg
- Harry Hardt as Waldstein
- Christiane Klein as Fanny Elssler
- Krista Wilk-Wanke as Mizzi at Friedrich VI

== Bibliography ==
- Hake, Sabine (2009). Bock, Hans-Michael; Bergfelder, Tim (eds.). The Concise Cinegraph: Encyclopaedia of German Cinema. New York, NY: Berghahn Books. doi:10.2307/j.ctt1x76dm6. ISBN 978-1571816559. JSTOR j.ctt1x76dm6. S2CID 252868046.
