= Lotte Neumann =

German film actress, screenwriter, and film producer (1896 – 1977)

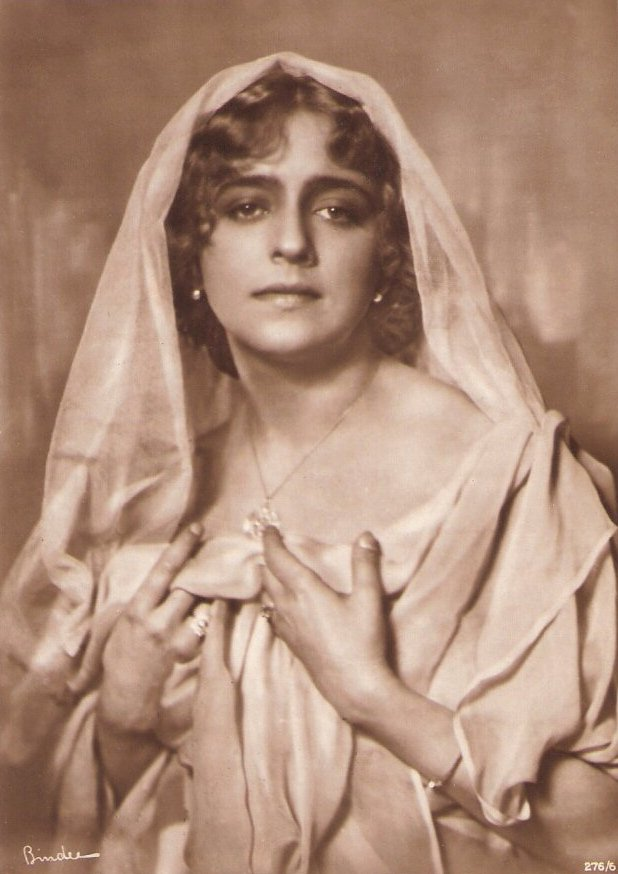
- Born: Charlotte Pötler; 5 August 1896; Berlin, German Empire
- Died: 26 February 1977 (aged 80); Gaißach, Bavaria, West Germany
- Other names: C.H. Diller; Charlotte Diller; Charlotte Bergmann
- Occupations: Actress, screenwriter, film producer
- Years active: 1912–1958
- Spouse: Walter Wassermann (m. 1935; died 1944)

Lotte Neumann (born Charlotte Pötler, 5 August 1896 – 26 February 1977) was a German film actress, screenwriter, and film producer.

== Biography ==
Lotte Neumann was born Charlotte Pötler on 5 August 1896 in Berlin. She attended the Königliche Luisenschule in her hometown, and then the Wagnersche-Klinkhardsche Höhere Mädchenschule. At 13, she completed vocal training with Karl Grünwald and Emma Sebold, and took acting lessons, as well as studied dance and piano. She was a choir singer at the Komische Oper Berlin and at the Komödienhaus.

Neumann originally wanted to be a singer, but at the urging of Max Mack, she instead opted for a career in film, and made her debut in the short Whims of Fate (1912) alongside Erwin Fichtner and Hanni Weisse, followed by Im Übermut (1912) and Das Bild der Mutter (1912).

Popular throughout Germany, a Lotte Neumann film serial was shot throughout 1917. These films include Hinter verschlossenen Türen (1917), Die Richterin (1917), Schweigen im Walde Part 1: Ein Erbfolgestreit (1918), Schweigen im Walde Part 2: Eine aussergerichtlige Einigung (1918), and Schatten der Vergangenheit (1919), all of which Neumann produced herself. In addition to being an actress and producer, Neumann also was a screenwriter. She wrote her first screenplay, Die Töchter des Herrn von Dornberg, in 1918.

In 1916, Neumann founded her own film company, Lotte-Neumann-Film-GmbH, which existed until 1919. From 1919 onwards, Neumann worked for UFA.

In 1920, Neumann starred in Moj and Romeo and Juliet in the Snow, directed by Ernst Lubitsch. She remained a popular actress throughout the 1920s, working with directors such as Reinhold Schünzel, Rudolf Biebrach, Hans Werckmeister, and Adolf E. Licho. Her greatest successes were The Brigantine of New York (1924), A Woman for 24 Hours (1925), and the French-German film The Good Reputation (1926).

Neumann's career began to decline after the advent of sound film, and her final screen appearance was in Die Liebesfiliale (1931). According to Neumann, she ended her career as an actress due to a lengthy divorce proceeding which lasted from 1929 to 1932.

After her retirement from the screen, Neumann continued to write screenplays under the names C.H. Diller or Charlotte Diller, and entered a creative partnership with her husband, director Walter Wassermann, which lasted from 1935 until his death in 1944. She is credited with writing 24 films, including The Beggar Student (1936), Men Without a Fatherland (1937), Sergeant Berry (1938), and Kora Terry (1940). After World War II, Neumann wrote two more screenplays, her final being One Should Be Twenty Again (1958).

Neumann died on 26 February 1977 in Gaißach.

== Selected filmography ==
Actress

- The Destiny of Carola van Geldern (1919)
- Romeo and Juliet in the Snow (1920)
- Moj (1920)
- The Woman in Doctor's Garb (1920)
- The Adventure of Doctor Kircheisen (1921)
- The Eternal Struggle (1921)
- The Solemn Oath (1921)
- The Three Aunts (1921)
- Father Won't Allow It (1921)
- The Game with Women (1922)
- The Brigantine of New York (1924)
- A Woman for 24 Hours (1924)
- The Story of Lilian Hawley (1925)
- The Woman in Gold (1926)
- The Good Reputation (1926)
- Der fröhliche Weinberg (1927)
- He Goes Right, She Goes Left! (1928)
- Die Liebesfiliale (1931)

Screenwriter

- The Beggar Student (1936)
- Men Without a Fatherland (1937)
- Sergeant Berry (1938)
- Mystery About Beate (1938)
- Robert Koch (1939)
- Friedrich Schiller – The Triumph of a Genius (1940)
- Kora Terry (1940)
- The Night in Venice (1942)
- An Old Heart Becomes Young Again (1943)
- Wedding in Transit (1953)
- One Should Be Twenty Again (1958)

== Bibliography ==
- Jung, Uli & Schatzberg, Walter. Beyond Caligari: The Films of Robert Wiene. Berghahn Books, 1999.
