= Furnished Room =

1929 film

- Directed by: Fred Sauer
- Written by: Fritz Falkenstein; Walter Schlee; Walter Wassermann
- Starring: Margot Landa; Fritz Schulz; Hans Albers
- Cinematography: László Schäffer
- Production company: Strauss Film
- Release date: 29 March 1929
- Running time: 96 minutes
- Country: Germany
- Languages: Silent; German intertitles

Furnished Room (German: Möblierte Zimmer) is a 1929 German silent drama film directed by Fred Sauer and starring Margot Landa, Fritz Schulz and Hans Albers. It was shot at the Johannisthal Studios in Berlin. The film's sets were designed by art director Max Heilbronner.

== Cast ==
- Margot Landa as Lilly
- Fritz Schulz as Harry
- Hans Albers as Edler von Stepanowic
- Hertha von Walther as Käthe
- Yvette Darnys as Baronin Tiefenberg
- Lidiya Tridenskaya as Frau Miradowa
- Paul Hörbiger as Kalinowski
- Emil Rameau as Chef des Warenhauses
- Karl Falkenberg as Kriminalkommissar
- Hilde Schenk
- Ludwig Stössel

== Bibliography ==
- Hans-Michael Bock and Tim Bergfelder. The Concise Cinegraph: An Encyclopedia of German Cinema. Berghahn Books.
