= Romeo and Juliet in the Snow =

1920 film directed by Ernst Lubitsch

- Directed by: Ernst Lubitsch
- Written by: Hanns Kräly; Ernst Lubitsch
- Produced by: Paul Ebner; Maxim Galitzenstein
- Starring: Lotte Neumann; Julius Falkenstein; Gustav von Wangenheim
- Cinematography: Theodor Sparkuhl
- Production company: Maxim-Film
- Release date: 12 March 1920
- Running time: 45 minutes
- Country: Germany
- Languages: Silent; German intertitles

Romeo and Juliet in the Snow

Romeo and Juliet in the Snow (German: Romeo und Julia im Schnee) is a 1920 German silent comedy film directed by Ernst Lubitsch and starring Lotte Neumann, Julius Falkenstein and Gustav von Wangenheim. The film's title plays off of the William Shakespeare play Romeo and Juliet.

== Cast ==
- Lotte Neumann as Julia Capulethofer
- Gustav von Wangenheim as Romeo Montekugerl
- Jakob Tiedtke as Capulethofer
- Marga Köhler as Frau Capulethofer
- Ernst Rückert as Montekugerl
- Paul Biensfeldt as Beamte
- Julius Falkenstein as Paris
- Hermann Picha as Beamte
- Josefine Dora as Frau Montekugerl

== Bibliography ==
- Kristin Thompson. Herr Lubitsch Goes to Hollywood: German and American Film After World War I. Amsterdam University Press, 2005.
