= The Story of Lilian Hawley =

1925 film

- Directed by: Franz W. Koebner
- Written by: Paul Helwig
- Starring: Lotte Neumann; Livio Pavanelli
- Cinematography: Emil Schünemann
- Production company: Tadeus Tobolski
- Release date: 20 February 1925
- Country: Germany
- Languages: Silent; German intertitles

The Story of Lilian Hawley (German: Der Roman der Lilian Hawley) is a 1925 German silent drama film directed by Franz W. Koebner and starring Lotte Neumann and Livio Pavanelli.

The film's sets were designed by the art director Robert Neppach.

== Cast ==
- Lantelme Dürer as Mrs. Hawley
- Lotte Neumann as Lilian
- Livio Pavanelli as Mr. Hawley
- Luigi Serventi as Jonny

== Bibliography ==
- Grange, William. Cultural Chronicle of the Weimar Republic. Scarecrow Press, 2008.
