= Single Father =

Single Father may refer to:

- single father, a male single parent
- "Single Father", a 2003 single by Kid Rock from the album Kid Rock
- Single Father (TV series), a 2010 British television drama

== See also ==
- Single Mother (disambiguation)
