= The Woman's Crusade =

1926 film

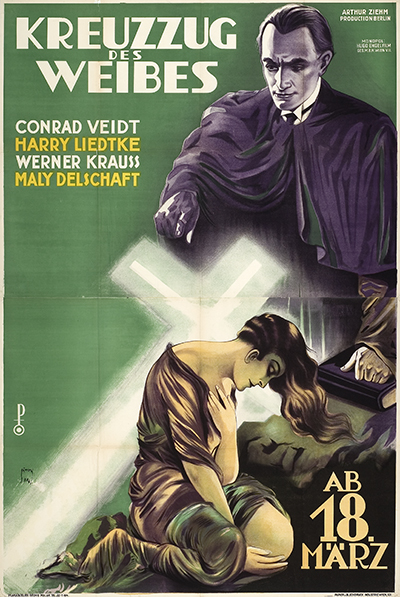
- German film poster
- German: Kreuzzug des Weibes
- Directed by: Martin Berger
- Written by: Martin Berger; Dosio Koffler
- Produced by: Arthur Ziehm
- Starring: Conrad Veidt; Maly Delschaft; Harry Liedtke
- Cinematography: Sophus Wangøe; A. O. Weitzenberg
- Music by: Friedrich Hollaender
- Production company: Arthur Ziehm Film
- Distributed by: Arthur Ziehm Film
- Release date: 1 October 1926
- Country: Germany
- Languages: Silent; German intertitles

The Woman's Crusade (German: Kreuzzug des Weibes) is a 1926 German silent drama film directed by Martin Berger and starring Conrad Veidt, Maly Delschaft, and Harry Liedtke.

The film's sets were designed by the art director Robert A. Dietrich.

== Cast ==
- Conrad Veidt as the prosecutor
- Maly Delschaft as the teacher
- Harry Liedtke as the doctor
- Werner Krauss as the idiot
- Ernst Hofmann as the modern man
- Andja Zimowa as the modern woman
- Fritz Alberti as the worker
- Gertrud Arnold as the worker woman
- Simone Vaudry as the daughter
- Aribert Wäscher as the family doctor
- Hedwig Wangel as the woman porter
- Philipp Manning as the detective
- Iwa Wanja as the maid
- Hilde Gerdt as the flower girl
