= A Murderous Girl =

1927 film

- German: Ein Mordsmädel
- Directed by: Sidney Morgan
- Written by: Ruth Goetz; Herbert Juttke
- Starring: Cilly Feindt; Werner Pittschau; Harry Hardt
- Cinematography: Günther Krampf
- Music by: Hans May
- Production company: Wilhelm Feindt Film
- Distributed by: Wilhelm Feindt Film
- Release date: 21 April 1927
- Country: Germany
- Languages: Silent; German intertitles

A Murderous Girl (German: Ein Mordsmädel) is a 1927 German silent thriller film directed by Sidney Morgan and starring Cilly Feindt, Werner Pittschau and Harry Hardt.

The film's sets were designed by the art director Gustav A. Knauer.

== Cast ==
- Cilly Feindt
- Werner Pittschau
- Harry Hardt
- Erich Kaiser-Titz
- Karl Platen
- Alexander Murski
- Nina Vanna
- Franz Klebusch
- Franz Verdier
- Hans Sternberg
- Paul Conradi
