= The Three Aunts (film) =

1921 film

- Directed by: Rudolf Biebrach
- Written by: Ruth Goetz
- Produced by: Paul Ebner; Maxim Galitzenstein
- Starring: Lotte Neumann; Olga Limburg; Johannes Riemann
- Cinematography: Otto Tober
- Production company: Maxim-Film
- Release date: 10 February 1921
- Country: Germany
- Languages: Silent; German intertitles

The Three Aunts (German: Die drei Tanten) is a 1921 German silent film directed by Rudolf Biebrach and starring Lotte Neumann, Olga Limburg and Johannes Riemann.

== Cast ==
- Lotte Neumann as Ellen Hegelund
- Johannes Riemann as Erik von Straaten
- Olga Limburg as Aunt
- Josefine Dora as Aunt
- Emmy Wyda as Aunt
- Charles Puffy
- Willi Allen
- Adolf Klein as Graf Hegelund
- Rosa Valetti

== Bibliography ==
- Grange, William. Cultural Chronicle of the Weimar Republic. Scarecrow Press, 2008.
