= The Stranger (1931 film) =

1931 film

- Directed by: Fred Sauer
- Written by: Gaston Ravel; Walter Schlee; Walter Wassermann
- Produced by: Liddy Hegewald
- Starring: Gerda Maurus; Peter Voß; Harry Hardt
- Cinematography: Léonce-Henri Burel
- Production companies: Films Jean de la Cour; Hegewald Film
- Distributed by: Hegewald Film
- Release date: 5 February 1931
- Running time: 88 minutes
- Countries: France; Germany
- Language: German

The Stranger (German: Die Fremde) is a 1931 French-German drama film directed by Fred Sauer and starring Gerda Maurus, Peter Voß and Harry Hardt.

The film's sets were designed by the art director Lazare Meerson. It was shot at the Epinay Studios in Paris. It was made as a Multiple-language version with separate versions also produced in French (The Foreigner) and Italian.

== Synopsis ==
The wife of an American millionaire begins a passionate relationship with his secretary.

== Cast ==
- Gerda Maurus
- Peter Voß
- Harry Hardt
- Alfred Beierle
- Grete Natzler
- Heinz Salfner

== Bibliography ==
- Alfred Krautz. International directory of cinematographers, set- and costume designers in film, Volume 4. Saur, 1984.
