= The Shadows of That Night =

1922 film

- Directed by: Fred Sauer
- Written by: Walter Wassermann
- Starring: Hans Adalbert Schlettow; Hilde Wolter; Hermann Picha
- Cinematography: Johannes Männling
- Production company: Orplid-Film
- Release date: 29 March 1922
- Country: Germany
- Languages: Silent; German intertitles

The Shadows of That Night (German: Die Schatten jener Nacht) is a 1922 German silent film directed by Fred Sauer and starring Hans Adalbert Schlettow, Hans Adalbert Schlettow, Hilde Wolter and Hermann Picha.

The film's sets were designed by the art director Franz Schroedter.

== Cast ==
- Hans Adalbert Schlettow as George Green
- Hilde Wolter as Daisy Plunkett
- Hermann Picha as Lahme Jonny
- Adele Hartwig as Alte Kelly
- Carl Wilhelm Tetting as James Brown
- Hugo Fischer-Köppe
