= Single Mother (film) =

1928 film

- Directed by: Fred Sauer
- Written by: Fred Sauer; Walter Wassermann
- Produced by: Georg Jacoby
- Starring: Victor Colani; Werner Fuetterer; Lilian Hardt
- Cinematography: Arpad Viragh
- Production company: Orplid-Film
- Distributed by: Messtro-Orplid
- Release date: February 14, 1928 (Berlin)
- Country: Germany
- Languages: Silent; German intertitles

Single Mother or Unwed Mothers (German: Ledige Mütter, lit. Unwed Mothers) is a 1928 German silent drama film directed by Fred Sauer and starring Victor Colani, Werner Fuetterer, and Lilian Hardt.

The film's art direction was by Willi Herrmann.

== Plot ==
A young woman who works as a stenographer falls in love with an engineer. In order to establish the financial basis for their marriage, the engineer takes a position in Mexico which will separate them for a few years, but when he leaves the woman does not tell him that she is pregnant. She asks a second woman who is an unwed mother to live with her and her mother.

== Cast ==
In alphabetical order

- Victor Colani
- Werner Fuetterer
- Lilian Hardt
- Paul Henckels
- Margot Landa
- Eberhard Leithoff
- Ellen Plessow
- Lydia Potechina
- Frida Richard
- Margarete Schlegel
- Walter Slezak
- Helga Thomas
- Hermann Vallentin
- Hertha von Walther

== Bibliography ==
- Grange, William. Cultural Chronicle of the Weimar Republic. Scarecrow Press, 2008.
