= 1920 in science fiction =

The year 1920 was marked, in science fiction, by the following events.

== Births and deaths ==
=== Births ===
- January 2: Isaac Asimov, American writer, (died 1992).
- May 9:
  - William Tenn, American writer (died 2010)
  - Richard George Adams, British writer (died 2016)
- June 13: Walter Ernsting, German writer, (died 2005)
- August 22: Ray Bradbury, American writer (died 2012)
- October 8: Frank Herbert, American writer (died 1986)
- Peter Phillips, British writer (died 2012)

== Awards ==
The main science-fiction Awards known at the present time did not exist at this time.

== Literary releases ==
=== Novels ===
- We, novel by Yevgeny Zamyatin.
- A Voyage to Arcturus, novel by David Lindsay.
- (in French) Le Formidable Événement, novel by Maurice Leblanc.
- City of Endless Night, novel by Milo Hastings.

=== Short stories ===
- The Comet, short story by W. E. B. Du Bois, originally published as a chapter in Darkwater: Voices from Within the Veil.

== Audiovisual outputs ==
=== Movies ===
- Algol, by Hans Werckmeister.
- The Head of Janus, by Friedrich Wilhelm Murnau.

== Set in 1920 ==
This section lists science fiction works not published in 1920 but whose narrative is set, wholly or partly, in the year 1920.

=== Short stories ===
- The Repairer of Reputations, short story by Robert W. Chambers, first published in The King in Yellow (1895), depicting an alternate vision of the year 1920.

== See also ==
- 1920 in science
- 1919 in science fiction
- 1921 in science fiction
