= The Field Marshal =

1927 film

- Directed by: Romano Mengon
- Written by: Ida Jenbach; Ruth Willard
- Produced by: Wilhelm Feindt
- Starring: Cilly Feindt; Paul Rehkopf; Harry Hardt
- Cinematography: Paul Rischke
- Music by: Hans May
- Production company: Wilhelm Feindt Films
- Distributed by: Wilhelm Feindt Films
- Release date: 9 February 1927
- Country: Germany
- Languages: Silent; German intertitles

The Field Marshal (German: Der Feldmarschall) is a 1927 German silent war drama film directed by Romano Mengon and starring Cilly Feindt, Paul Rehkopf, Harry Hardt. The film's sets were designed by art director August Rinaldi.

== Cast ==
In alphabetical order

- Cilly Feindt
- Harry Gondi
- Harry Hardt
- Manja Keller
- Arnold Korff
- Paul Rehkopf
- Luise Werckmeister

== Bibliography ==
- Grange, William. Cultural Chronicle of the Weimar Republic. Scarecrow Press, 2008.
