= Frisian Blood =

1925 film

- Directed by: Fred Sauer
- Written by: Ilse Schlettow
- Starring: Jenny Jugo; Gustav Fröhlich; Hans Adalbert Schlettow
- Cinematography: Werner Bohne; Giovanni Vitrotti
- Production company: Phoebus Film
- Distributed by: Phoebus Film
- Release date: October 1925
- Running time: 92 minutes
- Country: Germany
- Languages: Silent; German intertitles

Frisian Blood (German: Friesenblut) is a 1925 German silent film directed by Fred Sauer and starring Jenny Jugo, Gustav Fröhlich and Hans Adalbert Schlettow.

The film's sets were designed by the art director Willi Herrmann.

== Cast ==
- Jenny Jugo as Marlem Larsen
- Gustav Fröhlich as Jörg Larsen Fischer
- Hans Adalbert Schlettow as Klaus Detlefsen
- Fritz Alberti
- Frieda Lehndorf as Stine Larsen
- Philipp Manning as Christian Boos
- Grete Reinwald as Antje Boos

== Bibliography ==
- Bock, Hans-Michael & Bergfelder, Tim. The Concise Cinegraph: Encyclopaedia of German Cinema. Berghahn Books, 2009.
