= The Golden Net =

1922 film

- Directed by: Hans Werckmeister
- Written by: Richard Löwenbein; Hans Werckmeister
- Starring: Ernst Hofmann; Julia Serda; Charlotte Ander
- Cinematography: Gustave Preiss
- Production company: Deulig Film
- Distributed by: Deulig-Verleih
- Release date: 20 January 1922
- Country: Germany
- Languages: Silent; German intertitles

The Golden Net (German: Das goldene Netz) is a 1922 German silent film directed by Hans Werckmeister and starring Ernst Hofmann, Julia Serda and Charlotte Ander.

The film's sets were designed by the art director Robert Neppach.

== Cast ==
- Ernst Hofmann as Donald
- Julia Serda as Lady Rowena
- Charlotte Ander as Alice
- Adele Sandrock as Virgine Hutten, seine Mutter
- Erra Bognar as Evelyn Morlay
- Charles Willy Kayser as Frank Hutten
- Alexander Kökert as Herzog von Erpingham
- Alfred Schmasow as Sir Adam Campbell
- Franz Schönfeld as John Tupper
- Aenderly Lebius
- Adolf E. Licho

== Bibliography ==
- Bock, Hans-Michael & Bergfelder, Tim. The Concise CineGraph. Encyclopedia of German Cinema. Berghahn Books, 2009.
