= Fritz Alberti =

German actor (1877–1954)

- Born: Friedrich Wilhelm Alberti; 22 October 1877; Hanau, German Empire
- Died: 15 September 1954 (aged 76); West Berlin, West Germany
- Occupation: Film actor
- Years active: 1921–1935

Fritz Alberti (born Friedrich Wilhelm Alberti; 22 October 1877 – 15 September 1954) was a German actor.

== Selected filmography ==
- People in Ecstasy (1921)
- The Other Woman (1924)
- The Blackguard (1925)
- Ship in Distress (1925)
- The Hanseatics (1925)
- Frisian Blood (1925)
- I Love You (1925)
- If Only It Weren't Love (1925)
- Vienna - Berlin (1926)
- The Sea Cadet (1926)
- Battle of the Sexes (1926)
- The Student of Prague (1926)
- White Slave Traffic (1926)
- The Woman's Crusade (1926)
- Café Elektric (1927)
- U-9 Weddigen (1927)
- The Ways of Love Are Strange (1927)
- The Impostor (1927)
- Aftermath (1927)
- The Sporck Battalion (1927)
- That Was Heidelberg on Summer Nights (1927)
- Docks of Hamburg (1928)
- Because I Love You (1928)
- The Gallant Hussar (1928)
- Rasputin (1928)
- Escape from Hell (1928)
- Five Anxious Days (1928)
- The Lady and the Chauffeur (1928)
- Circumstantial Evidence (1929)
- Inherited Passions (1929)
- The Woman of Yesterday and Tomorrow (1928)
- The Ship of Lost Souls (1929)
- Misled Youth (1929)
- It's You I Have Loved (1929)
- The Adjutant of the Czar (1929)
- Darling of the Gods (1930)
- Oh Those Glorious Old Student Days (1930)
- Love's Carnival (1930)
- The Dreyfus Case (1930)
- Two People (1930)
- The White Devil (1930)
- 1914 (1931)
- By a Nose (1931)
- Grock (1931)
- The Theft of the Mona Lisa (1931)
- The Battle of Bademunde (1931)
- Student Life in Merry Springtime (1931)
- Death Over Shanghai (1932)
- The First Right of the Child (1932)
- Marshal Forwards (1932)
- Tannenberg (1932)
- The Secret of Johann Orth (1932)
- The House of Dora Green (1933)
- The Voice of Love (1934)
- The Sporck Battalion (1934)
- Elisabeth and the Fool (1934)
- The Grand Duke's Finances (1934)
