= The Destiny of Carola van Geldern =

1919 film

- Directed by: Carl Froelich
- Written by: Ludwig Wolff
- Starring: Lotte Neumann
- Production companies: Maxim-Film Ges. Ebner & Co (Berlin)
- Distributed by: Maxim-Film Ges. Ebner & Co
- Release date: 1919
- Countries: Austria; Germany
- Languages: Silent; German intertitles

The Destiny of Carola van Geldern (German: Das Schicksal der Carola van Geldern) is a 1919 Austrian-German silent film directed by Carl Froelich and starring Lotte Neumann.

== Cast ==
In alphabetical order

- Blandine Ebinger
- Margarete Ferida as Glidiens Freundin
- Paul Kaufmann as Dr. Ertzky
- Frau Klein-Rohden as Beschließerin
- Rudolf Lettinger as Jack
- Martin Lübbert as Dr. Graebner
- Lotte Neumann as Carola von Geldern
- Eduard Rothauser as Von glidien

== Bibliography ==
- Weniger, Kay (2011). "Es wird im Leben dir mehr genommen als gegeben...": Lexikon der aus Deutschland und Österreich emigrierten Filmschaffenden 1933 bis 1945 (in German). Berlin: Acabus. ISBN 978-3-86282-049-8.
