= Daughters of Darkness =

1971 film by Harry Kümel

- Belgian theatrical release poster
- Directed by: Harry Kümel
- Screenplay by: Pierre Drouot; Jean Ferry; Harry Kümel; Joseph Amiel (Note: English dialogue)
- Produced by: Henry Lange; Paul Collet
- Starring: Delphine Seyrig; John Karlen; Andrea Rau; Danielle Ouimet
- Cinematography: Eduard van der Enden
- Edited by: Gust Verschueren; Denis Bonan
- Music by: François de Roubaix
- Production companies: Showking Films; Maya Films; Roxy Film; Ciné Vog Films
- Distributed by: Ciné Vog Films (Belgium); Comacico (France); Inter-Verleih Film-Gesellschaft (West Germany)
- Release dates: 28 May 1971 (New York City); 25 November 1971 (France)
- Running time: 100 minutes
- Countries: Belgium; France; West Germany
- Language: English
- Budget: $750,000

Daughters of Darkness (Note: In France, Les Lèvres Rouges (lit. 'The Red Lips'), in Belgium, Le Rouge aux Lèvres (lit. 'The Red on the Lips'), and in the Netherlands, Dorst Naar Bloed (lit. 'Thirst for Blood')) is a 1971 erotic horror film co-written and directed by Harry Kümel and starring Delphine Seyrig, John Karlen, Andrea Rau, and Danielle Ouimet. Set in a nearly deserted seaside hotel in Belgium, the film follows a newlywed couple who encounter a mysterious Hungarian countess, Elizabeth Báthory, and her enigmatic companion. As tensions rise, the couple is drawn into a disturbing psychological and sexual game, with fatal consequences.

A surreal, stylish take on the vampire mythos, Daughters of Darkness blends gothic horror with psychological drama and eroticism. Kümel infuses the film with visual references to Marlene Dietrich and Louise Brooks, while exploring themes of gender, power, and identity. The narrative draws inspiration from historical accounts of Erzsébet Báthory, but recasts her as a seductive, controlling figure in a postwar, decadent setting.

Critics have praised Seyrig's performance as the charismatic vampire countess and interpreted the story as a commentary on patriarchal control, queer desire, and the disintegration of traditional gender roles.

== Plot ==
Stefan Chilton, the son of an aristocratic British family who was raised in the United States, is traveling with his new wife, Valerie, through Europe. The couple check into a grand hotel on the Ostend seafront in Belgium, intending to catch the cross-channel ferry to England, where Stefan's mother lives. Valerie notices that Stefan is reluctant to phone his mother, who is unaware of the couple's marriage. Because it is winter, the hotel is empty aside from Stefan and Valerie. At nightfall, a mysterious Hungarian countess, Elizabeth Báthory, arrives in a Bristol driven by her "secretary", Ilona. Elizabeth requests the royal suite, but the hotel's middle-aged concierge, Pierre, tells her it is occupied by the honeymooning couple. He also remarks having seen the countess at the same hotel when he was a mailboy, and observes that she has not aged. Elizabeth takes the adjoining suite, and appears fixated on the young couple. In their suite, Valerie reads a local newspaper article about a series of child murders in Bruges, each a girl whose throat was slashed.

While visiting Bruges the following day, Valerie and Stefan stumble upon a newly found crime scene of another murdered girl. Valerie is disturbed by Stefan's fascination with the crime. Back at the hotel, Elizabeth and Ilona acquaint themselves with Stefan and Valerie in the hotel lobby. During their conversation, a police officer appears at the hotel, and makes vague reference to having known Elizabeth years prior. She remains evasive to him. Elizabeth subsequently explains that she is a descendant of Erzsébet Báthory, and was named for her. She recounts the various violent acts that Bathory committed, particularly the murder and mutilation of young girls, whose blood she bathed in. Valerie is revulsed by the conversation, but Stefan appears to be sexually aroused by it. Stefan eventually agrees to phone his mother, who turns out to be a middle-aged, effeminate man. "Mother" scolds Stefan for getting married, but expresses curiosity at the prospect of meeting Valerie.

Later, Stefan beats Valerie in their hotel room, culminating in sadistic rape. The next day, Ilona seduces Stefan when Valerie attempts to leave Ostend. Elizabeth stops Valerie from leaving, and the two women spend the evening together discussing Valerie and Stefan's relationship. Elizabeth dissuades Valerie from remaining with Stefan, warning her that he will treat her as an inferior. Meanwhile, Stefan teases Ilona in the bathroom, and attempts to pull her into the shower. The two get into a tussle and slip and fall, causing Ilona to slash her hand on a razor before fatally falling on top of it. Valerie and Elizabeth return moments after, stumbling upon the scene. Elizabeth takes charge, ordering Valerie to clean up the blood while Stefan sits in shock, and the three subsequently drive into the country to dispose of Ilona's corpse.

After burying Ilona's body on the beach, the three return to the hotel at dawn. Valerie, under Elizabeth's spell, refuses to leave with Stefan. A violent fight ensues, during which Stefan's wrists are slashed by a broken bowl. As Stefan bleeds to death, Elizabeth and Valerie drink the blood pouring from his wounds. Just before dawn, they throw his corpse, wrapped in plastic, over a guardrail and onto a street below. Elizabeth gives his corpse one final kiss before they place it in Elizabeth's car to dispose of outside of town. The women flee in Elizabeth's car, Valerie driving at a high speed to cross over the border to France. Elizabeth insists that she not be caught in daylight. While speeding on a dense forest road, the women are blinded by sunlight, and Valerie loses control of the car, crashing. Elizabeth is thrown from the vehicle and impaled through the heart on a broken branch before her body is lit on fire by the car's subsequent explosion.

Several months later, Valerie approaches a young couple playing tennis at a resort for new prey, her voice now that of Elizabeth's.

== Cast ==
- Delphine Seyrig as Countess Elizabeth Báthory
- John Karlen as Stefan Chilton
- Danielle Ouimet as Valerie Chilton
- Andrea Rau as Ilona
- Paul Esser as Pierre
- Georges Jamin as retired policeman
- Joris Collet as butler
- Fons Rademakers as mother

== Production ==
Director Kumel, interviewed by Mark Gatiss for the BBC documentary Horror Europa said that he deliberately styled Delphine Seyrig's character after Marlene Dietrich and Andrea Rau's after Louise Brooks to deepen the intertextual resonance. Because the vampire character of Elizabeth Bathory is also a demagogue, Kumel dressed her in the Nazi colours of black, white and red. In commenting on both the film's mordant sense of humour and the director's painterly eye in the composition of several scenes, Gatiss drew forth the comment from Kumel that he considers the film very Belgian, especially due to the influence of Surrealism and Expressionism.

Extensive external shooting was done at the Royal Galleries of Ostend, a seaside neoclassical arcade on the beach at Ostend (especially at the luxury Grand Hotel des Thermes, which sits atop the central section of the arcade). The interior shooting was done at the Hotel Astoria, Brussels and other exteriors at the Tropical Gardens, Meise.

== Interpretations ==
The critic Camille Paglia writes in Sexual Personae (1990) that Daughters of Darkness is a good example of a "classy genre of vampire film" that "follows a style I call psychological high Gothic." Paglia sees this "abstract and ceremonious" style, which depicts evil as "hierarchical glamour" and deals with "eroticized western power", as beginning in Samuel Taylor Coleridge's poem Christabel, Edgar Allan Poe's short story "Ligeia", and Henry James's novella The Turn of the Screw.

According to the critic Geoffrey O'Brien, the film "leans flamboyantly toward the artistic end of the spectrum, with Delphine Seyrig sporting Marienbad-like costumes and the Belgian director conjuring up images of luxurious decadence replete with feathers, mirrors, and long, winding hotel corridors. At the film's core, however, is a deeply unpleasant evocation of a war of nerves between Seyrig's vampire and the bourgeois newlyweds into whose honeymoon she insinuates herself."

== Release ==
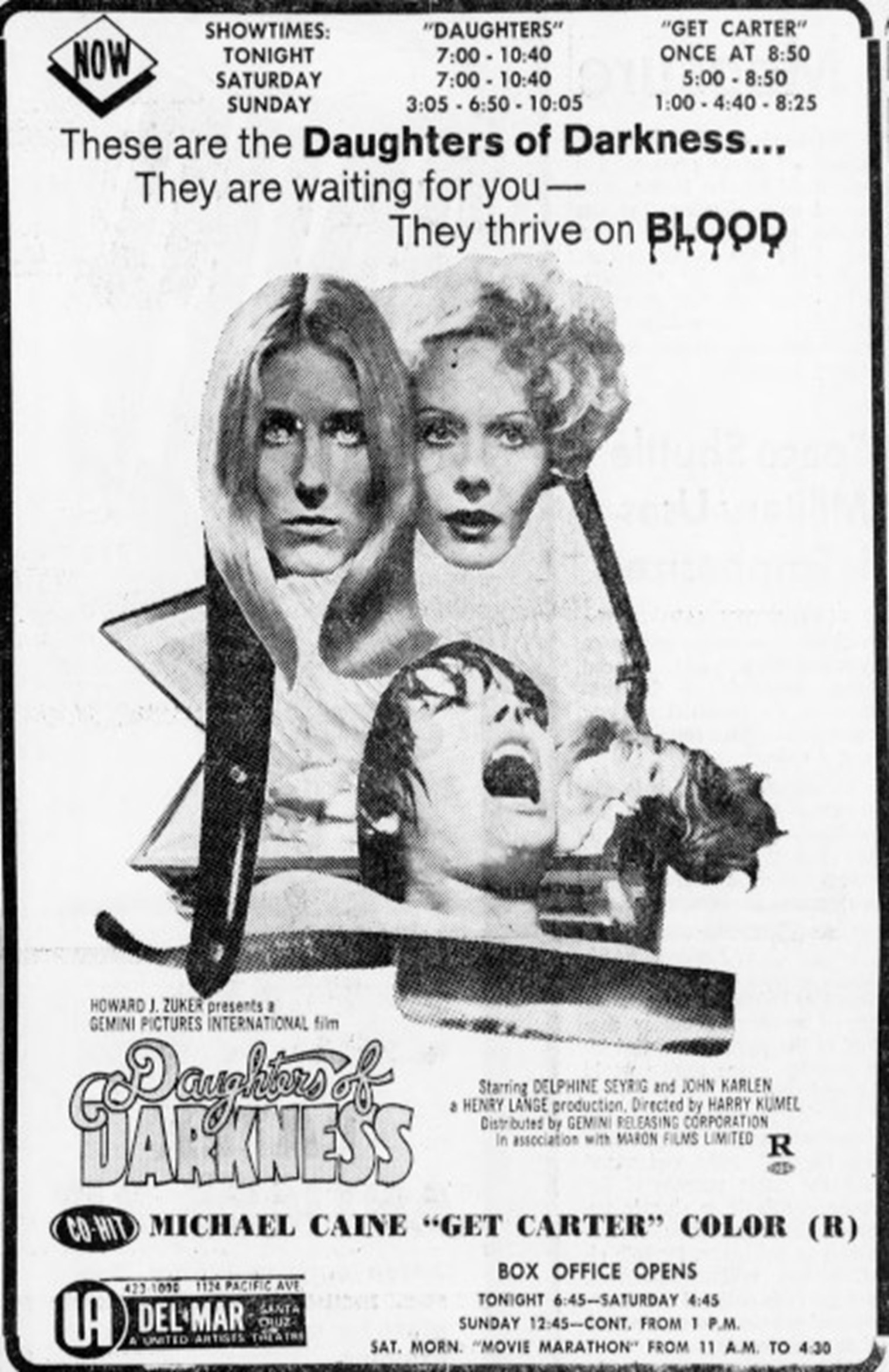
Advertisement from 1971 in Santa Cruz, California

The film first opened in the United States in New York City, premiering on 28 May 1971.

=== Critical reception ===
In the early 2010s, Time Out conducted a poll with several authors, directors, actors and critics who have worked within the horror genre to vote for their top horror films. Daughters of Darkness placed at number 90 on their top 100 list. On the review aggregator website Rotten Tomatoes, the film holds an approval rating of 85% based on 26 reviews, with an average rating of 7/10. Metacritic, which uses a weighted average, assigned the film a score of 74 out of 100, based on 14 critics, indicating "generally favorable" reviews.

== Legacy ==
Daughters of Darkness inspired Lucile Hadžihalilović's 2025 fantasy drama film The Ice Tower. Hadžihalilović said: "Delphine Seyrig's elegance, her erotic vibes, and the vampire kiss really resonated with me—she embodies cinematic allure. The twilight hotel adrift in a desolate landscape, the deep nostalgia and loneliness... And for Kümel's view on cinema: "One can mistreat the subjects as much as they want, but not the cinema."

The Rob Zombie song "Demonoid Phenomenon" from Hellbilly Deluxe samples the movie heavily.

== See also ==
- List of cult films
