= The Brigantine of New York =

1924 film

- Directed by: Hans Werckmeister
- Written by: Richard Bars
- Starring: Lotte Neumann; Karl Beckersachs; Elisabeth Pinajeff
- Cinematography: Ewald Daub
- Music by: Tilmar Springefeld
- Production company: Dewesti-Verleih
- Release date: 24 April 1924
- Country: Germany
- Languages: Silent; German intertitles

The Brigantine of New York (German: Die Brigantin von New York) is a 1924 German silent film directed by Hans Werckmeister and starring Lotte Neumann, Karl Beckersachs, and Elisabeth Pinajeff.

The film's sets were designed by the art director Gustav A. Knauer.

== Cast ==
- Lotte Neumann
- Karl Beckersachs
- Elisabeth Pinajeff
- Hilde Jennings
- Albert Paulig
- Erich Poremski
- Kurt Wolowsky

== Bibliography ==
- Krautz, Alfred (1984). International Directory of Cinematographers, Set- and Costume Designers in Film. Vol. 4. Munich: Saur. ISBN 978-3-598-21434-9.
