= High Treason (1929 German film) =

1929 film

- Gerda Maurus in the film
- Directed by: Johannes Meyer
- Written by: Wenzel Goldbaum (play); Alexander Alexander; Friedrich Raff
- Produced by: Alfred Zeisler
- Starring: Gerda Maurus; Gustav Fröhlich; Harry Hardt; Olga Engl
- Cinematography: Carl Hoffmann; Friedrich Weinmann
- Production company: UFA
- Distributed by: UFA
- Release date: 1 November 1929
- Country: Germany
- Languages: Silent; German intertitles

High Treason (German: Hochverrat) is a 1929 German silent drama film directed by Johannes Meyer and starring Gerda Maurus, Gustav Fröhlich and Harry Hardt. The film is set in pre-Revolution Russia. Maurus' performance was contrasted favourably with her appearance in Fritz Lang's Woman in the Moon by the magazine Film und Volk. The film's art direction was by Willi Herrmann.

== Cast ==
- Gerda Maurus as Vera
- Gustav Fröhlich as Wassil Gurmai
- Harry Hardt as Fürst Iwan Stolin
- Olga Engl as Fürstin Stolin seine Mutter
- Leopold von Ledebur as Grossfürst Kyrill, der Governeur
- Rudolf Biebrach as Oberst Petroff
- Ossip Darmatow as Graf Starschenski
- Félix de Pomés as Nimirski
- Harry Frank as Pawel

== Bibliography ==
- Kreimeier, Klaus. The Ufa Story: A History of Germany's Greatest Film Company, 1918-1945. University of California Press, 1999.
