= The Leap into the Void =

1932 film

- Directed by: Leo Mittler
- Written by: Henry Leyford Gates (story); George Abbott; Curt Alexander
- Starring: Cilly Feindt; Aribert Mog; Sigurd Lohde
- Cinematography: Enzo Riccioni
- Production company: Paramount Pictures
- Distributed by: Paramount Pictures
- Release date: May 27, 1932
- Running time: 71 minutes
- Country: United States
- Language: German

The Leap into the Void (German: Der Sprung ins Nichts) is a 1932 American drama film directed by Leo Mittler and starring Cilly Feindt, Aribert Mog and Sigurd Lohde.

It was made at the Joinville Studios in Paris as the German-language version of the 1929 film Halfway to Heaven. Versions were also made in three other languages. multi-language versions were common in the early years of sound films before the technology of dubbing became better perfected.

== Cast ==
- Cilly Feindt as Greta
- Aribert Mog as Fred
- Sigurd Lohde as Jim
- Hermann Blaß as Der Direktor
- Erich Kestin as Slim
- Lucie Euler as Madame Elsie
- Ida Perry as Mrs. Lee
- Wolfgang Lohmeyer as Erik Lee
- Marguerite Roma
- Robert Eckert as Tony

== Bibliography ==
- Jan-Christopher Horak. Fluchtpunkt Hollywood: eine Dokumentation zur Filmemigration nach 1933. MAkS, 1986.
