= Sebastian Droste =

German poet, dancer and actor (1898–1927)

Sebastian Droste (born Willÿ Knobloch; 2 February 1898 – 27 June 1927) was a German poet, actor, and dancer associated with the underground art subculture of the Weimar Republic in the 1920s.

== Biography ==
=== Early life ===
Sebastian Droste was born into a prosperous Jewish family as Willy Knobloch in 1898; his father operated a successful silk stocking factory in Chemnitz, affording the young Knobloch a privileged upbringing. As a teenager, he sought independence from his family and enrolled in a local art school, where he demonstrated notable talent in languages, physical culture, and dance.

In 1915, Droste was drafted into the German army, likely serving on the Western Front during World War I. While details of his military service remain scarce, the shadow of war would later echo through the intensity and fragmentation of his artistic work.

=== Actor and Performer ===
Droste relocated from his hometown of Hamburg to Berlin in 1919. He earned a living as a naked dancer, choreographer and expressionist poet. His first poem appeared in April edition of Der Sturm that same year, titled 'Tanz' (Dance). A further 15 poems and ‘grotesques’ appeared across 12 editions of the journal alongside other artists and poets such as Kurt Schwitters and Paul Klee. He alternated between publishing under the name Willy or Willi Knobloch. Also in 1919 he published a drama in the Dresden based expressionist journal Menschen.

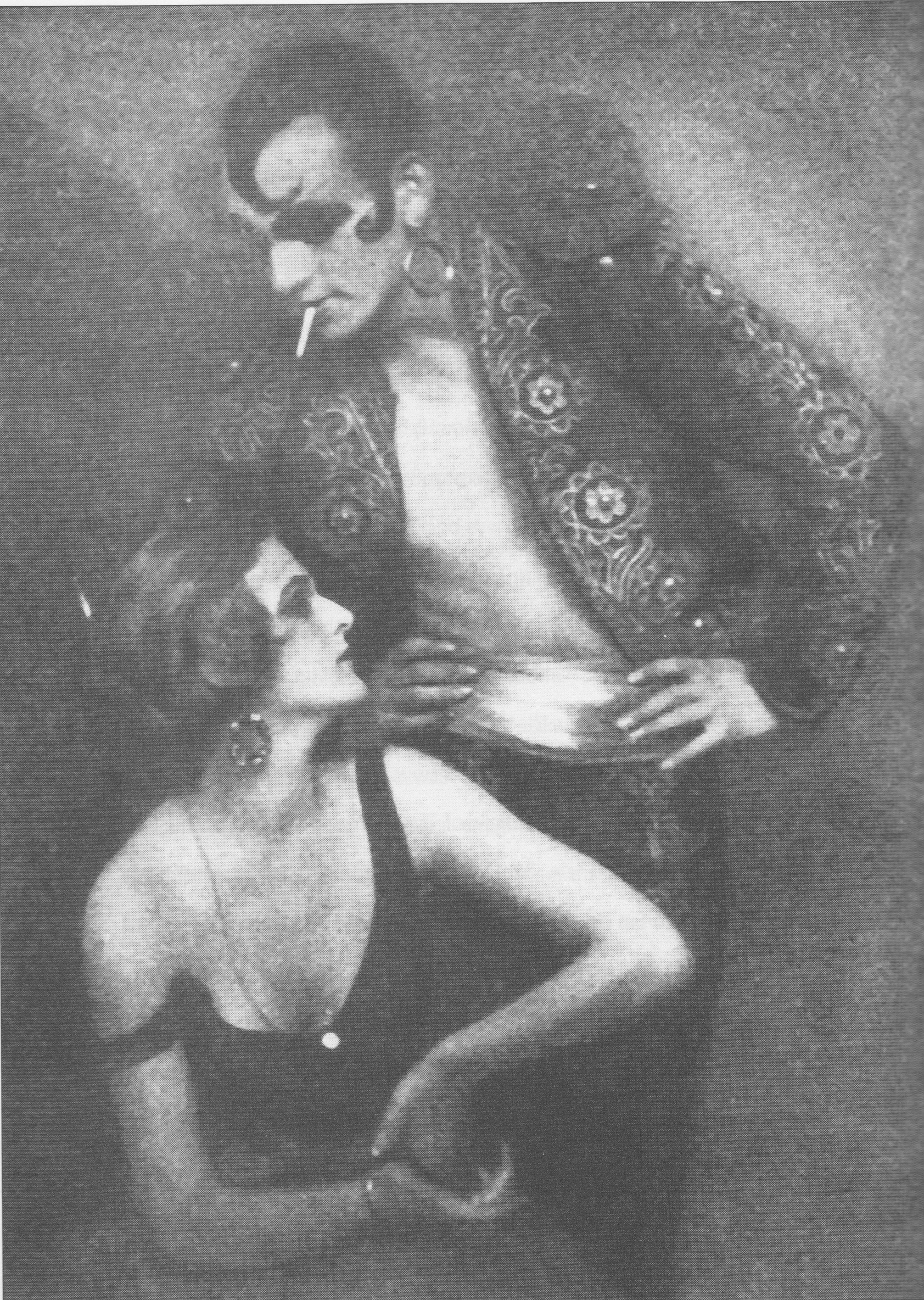
Droste and Berber in 1922

In 1922, Droste married expressionist exotic dancer and actress in silent movies of the Berlin scene, Anita Berber. She and Droste performed fantasias with titles such as "Suicide," "Morphium," and "Mad House". Droste appeared as a dancer in the silent movie Algol.

In 1923, Droste and Berber jointly published a book of poetry, photographs, and drawings called Die Tänze des Lasters, des Grauens und der Ekstase (Dances of Vice, Horror, and Ecstasy), based on their performance of the same name. Full of expressionist imagery, the book offered a glimpse into the angst and cynicism shadowing their artistic and personal existences. In 1923, the pair returned to Berlin, both struggling with severe cocaine addiction. Shortly thereafter, Droste reportedly stole furs and jewellery from Berber before leaving for New York with their marriage ending at the same time.

In 1925, Droste met with photographer Francis Bruguière in New York City where he styled himself as Baron Willy Sebastian Knobloch Droste. Together they composed over 60 photographs for a proposed expressionist film starring Droste tentatively titled The Way. UFA GmbH rejected the proposal and the photographs were instead published as part of a photographic journal in Die Dame in July 1925.

=== Illness and death ===
Droste was diagnosed with tuberculosis in early 1927. He returned to his parents' home in Hamburg, where he died on June 27 of the same year.

In the same year, following Droste’s death, the Art Centre in New York exhibited 35 photographs from The Way series. The exhibition received critical acclaim and is now regarded as one of the most significant contributions to Expressionist photography.

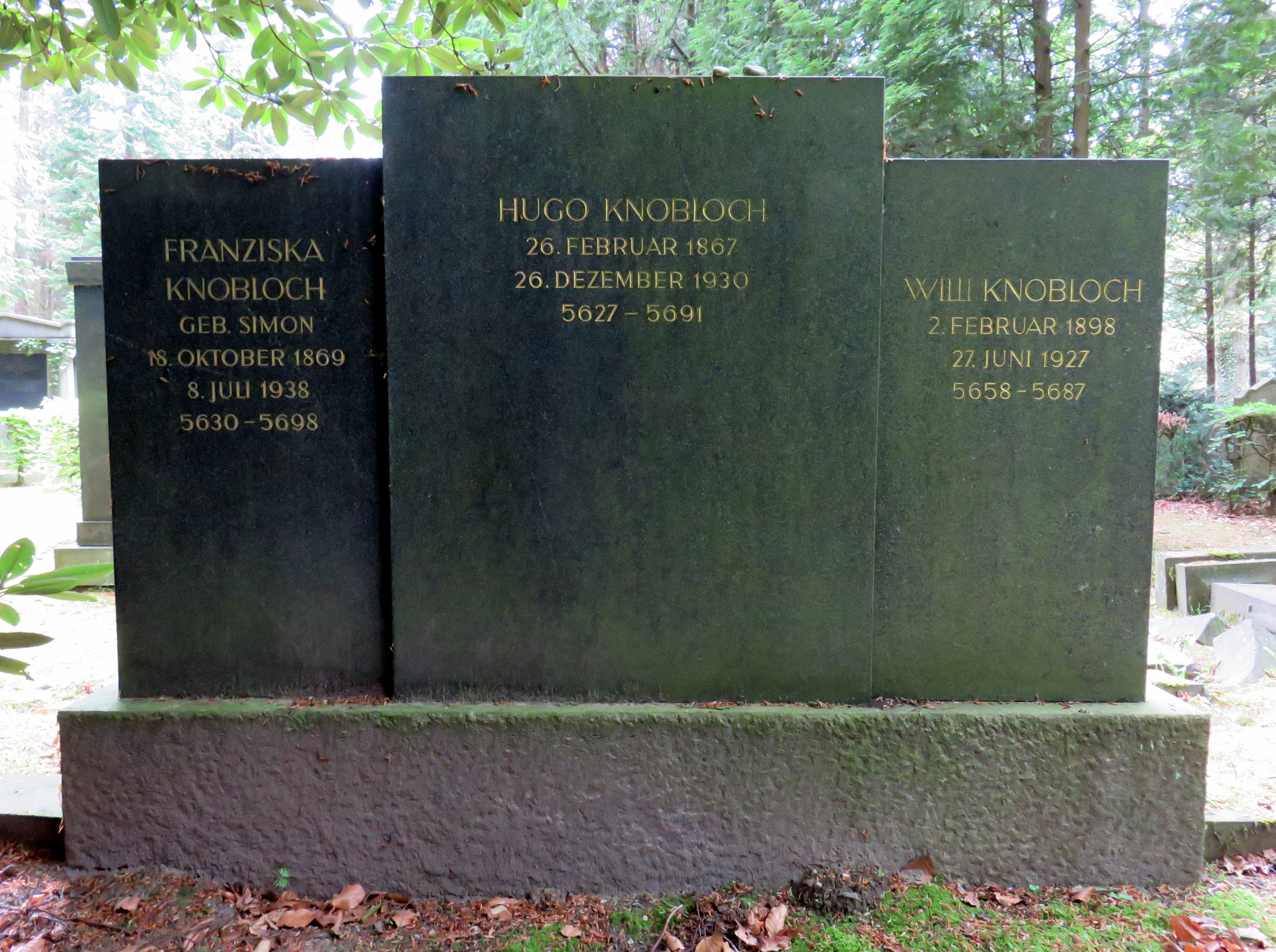
Sebastian Droste's gravestone “Willi Knobloch”, Jewish Cemetery Ohlsdorf (right side to his parents)

== Bibliography ==
- Capovilla, Andrea, "Anita Berber", Who's Who in Contemporary Gay and Lesbian History: From Antiquity to World War II. Robert Aldrich and Garry Wotherspoon, eds. (New York: Routledge, 2001), p. 50-51
- Toepfer, Karl Eric, Empire of Ecstasy: Nudity and Movement in German Body Culture, 1910-1935 (Berkeley: University of California Press, 1997)
- Droste, Sebastian (& Berber, Anita), Dances of Vice, Horror, and Ecstasy (A full translation from the German by Merrill Cole) (Newcastle upon Tyne: Side Real Press 2012)
