= Jailbreak in Hamburg =

1971 film

- Directed by: Wolfgang Staudte
- Written by: Fred Denger; George Hurdalek
- Produced by: Walter Koppel; Heinz Willeg
- Starring: Horst Frank; Christiane Krüger; Heinz Reincke
- Cinematography: Giorgio Tonti
- Edited by: Renate Willeg
- Music by: Peter Schirmann
- Production companies: Allianz Filmproduktion; Terra-Filmkunst; Walter Koppel Film
- Distributed by: Constantin Film
- Release date: 15 October 1971
- Running time: 83 minutes
- Country: West Germany
- Language: German

Jailbreak in Hamburg (German: Fluchtweg St. Pauli) is a 1971 German thriller film directed by Wolfgang Staudte and starring Horst Frank, Christiane Krüger, and Heinz Reincke.

The film's sets were designed by the art director Peter Rothe. It was shot on location around Hamburg including on the Reeperbahn.

== Synopsis ==
A dangerous prisoner escapes in a jailbreak and goes on the loose in Hamburg where he seeks assistance from his family.

== Cast ==
- Horst Frank as Willy Jensen
- Christiane Krüger as Vera Jensen
- Heinz Reincke as Heinz Jensen
- Klaus Schwarzkopf as Kommisar Knudsen
- Siegurd Fitzek as Timpe
- Heidy Bohlen as Liliane Berndorf
- Ulrich Beiger as Berndorf
- Andrea Rau as Maggy
- Gerhard Bormann as Löffler
- Ingeburg Kanstein as Polizistin Fiedler
- Horst Hesslein as Jimmy
- Harry Wolff as Mann
- Curt Timm as Burkhardt
