= The Impostor (1927 film) =

1927 film

- Ruth Weyher, Anton Pointner
- Directed by: Martin Berger
- Written by: Hans Land (novel); Walter Wassermann
- Starring: Ruth Weyher; Anton Pointner; Philipp Manning
- Cinematography: Rudolph Maté
- Music by: Hans May
- Production company: Hermes-Film
- Distributed by: Bavaria Film
- Release date: 28 January 1927
- Running time: 81 minutes
- Country: Germany
- Languages: Silent; German intertitles

The Impostor (German: Die Hochstaplerin) is a 1927 German silent drama film directed by Martin Berger and starring Ruth Weyher, Anton Pointner and Philipp Manning. It was shot at the Johannisthal Studios in Berlin. The film's sets were designed by the art director Otto Erdmann and Hans Sohnle.

== Cast ==
- Ruth Weyher as Die Hochstaplerin Baronin Neruda
- Anton Pointner as Ihr Freund, von Torelli
- Philipp Manning as Geschäftsfreund
- Theodor Loos as Prof. Gehrsdorf
- Margarete Lanner as Edith Bernau
- Ernst Rückert as Gutsbesitzer Wothe
- Fritz Alberti as Förster
- Bruno Arno as Zuhöhrer
- Sophie Pagay as Gehrsdorfs Wirtschaftlerin
- Paul Graetz as Juwelier
- Erna Rima as Kellnerin
- Dagmar Murzewa as Frau des Förters

== Bibliography ==
- Paul Matthew St. Pierre. Cinematography in the Weimar Republic: Lola Lola, Dirty Singles, and the Men Who Shot Them. Rowman & Littlefield, 2016.
