= The Woman in Gold (film) =

1926 film

- Directed by: Pierre Marodon
- Written by: Franz Xaver Kappus (novel); Fred Sauer; Walter Wassermann
- Starring: Lotte Neumann; Ernö Verebes; Suzanne Pierson
- Cinematography: Paul Portier
- Music by: Felix Bartsch
- Production company: Hermes-Film
- Distributed by: Terra Film
- Release date: 29 April 1926
- Running time: 75 minutes
- Countries: Germany; France
- Languages: Silent; German intertitles

The Woman in Gold (German: Die Frau in Gold, French: Les Voleurs de gloire) is a 1926 German-French silent film directed by Pierre Marodon and starring Lotte Neumann, Ernö Verebes and Suzanne Pierson.

The film's sets were directed by Fritz Kraenke.

== Cast ==
- Lotte Neumann as Véra Barkany
- Ernö Verebes as Georges Lenoir
- Suzanne Pierson as Suzanne de Fronval
- Henri Baudin as Paul Berkany
- Eduard von Winterstein
- Paul Graetz
- Ferdinand Bonn
- Sophie Pagay

== Bibliography ==
- Alfred Krautz. International directory of cinematographers, set- and costume designers in film, Volume 4. Saur, 1984.
