= The Three Marys (film) =

1923 film

- Directed by: Reinhold Schünzel
- Written by: Robert Liebmann; Reinhold Schünzel
- Produced by: Victor Micheluzzi; Reinhold Schünzel
- Starring: Reinhold Schünzel; Anita Berber; Lya De Putti
- Cinematography: Josef Zeitlinger
- Production companies: Micco Film; Schünzel-Film
- Release date: 9 March 1923
- Countries: Austria; Germany
- Languages: Silent; German intertitles

The Three Marys or The Three Marys and the Lord of Marana (German: Die drei Marien und der Herr von Marana) is a 1923 Austrian-German silent film directed by Reinhold Schünzel and starring Schünzel, Anita Berber and Lya De Putti.

The film's sets were designed by the art director Oscar Friedrich Werndorff.

== Cast ==
- Reinhold Schünzel as Don Juan de la Marana
- Anita Berber
- Lya De Putti
- Olga Belajeff
- Hans Sieber
- Paul Kronegg
- Armin Springer
- Heinrich Eisenbach

== Bibliography ==
- Bock, Hans-Michael & Bergfelder, Tim. The Concise CineGraph. Encyclopedia of German Cinema. Berghahn Books, 2009.
