= Anita Berber =

German actress, dancer and writer (1899–1928)

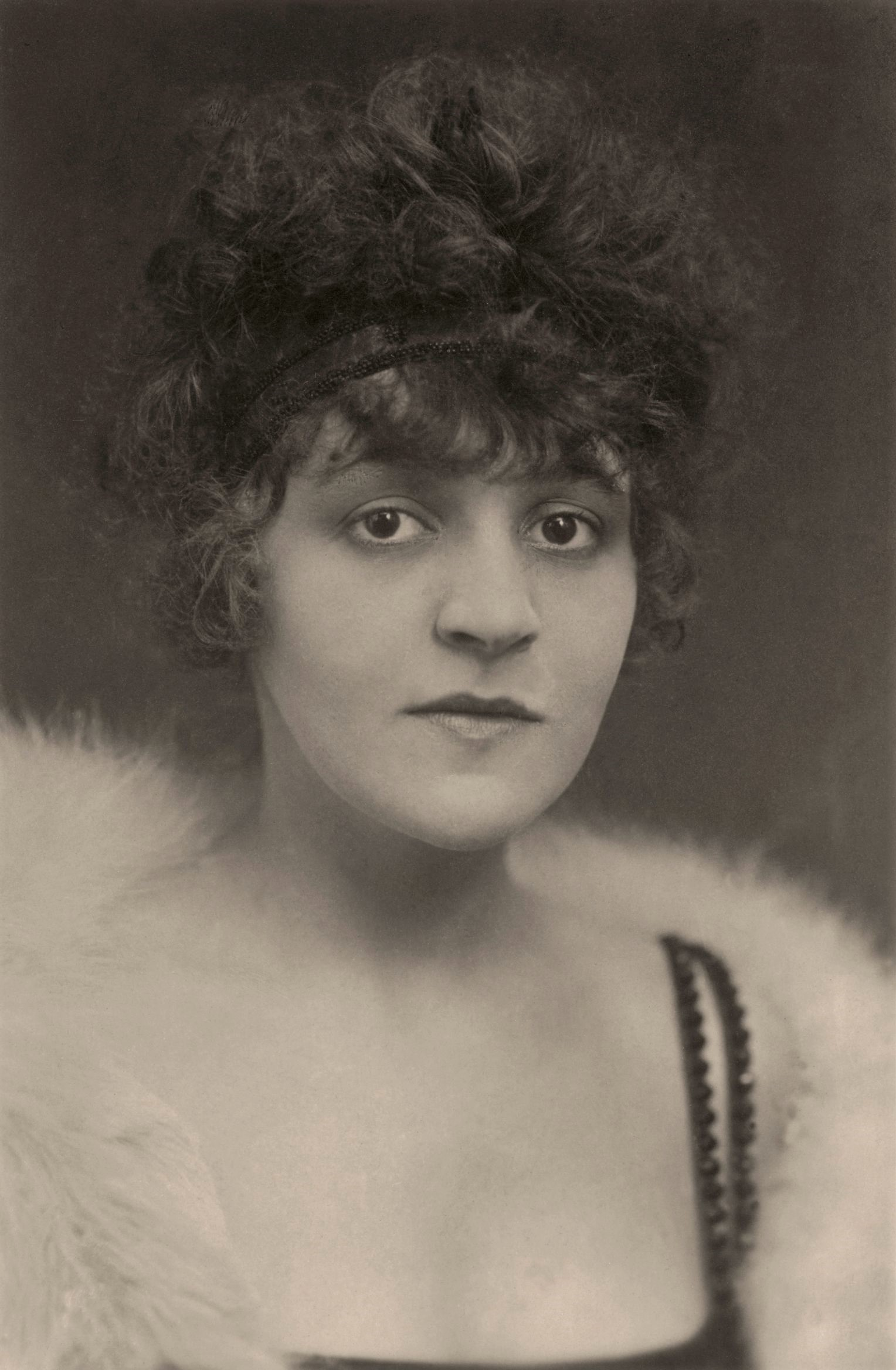
- Berber in the 1920s
- Born: 10 June 1899; Leipzig, Kingdom of Saxony, German Empire
- Died: 10 November 1928 (aged 29); Berlin-Kreuzberg, Berlin, Province of Brandenburg, Free State of Prussia, Weimar Republic
- Occupations: Dancer, actress, writer

Anita Berber (10 June 1899 – 10 November 1928) was a German dancer, actress, and writer who was the subject of an Otto Dix painting. She lived during the time of the Weimar Republic.

== Early life ==
Berber was born in Leipzig to the violinist Felix Berber, concertmaster of the Gewandhausorchester, and his wife, Anna Lucie Thiem, a cabaret singer and dancer, who later divorced when Berber was four. Berber was raised mainly by her grandmother in Dresden. In 1913 Berber studied dance at Émile Jaques-Dalcroze's school in Hellerau, which included training in rhythmic gymnastics, harmony, and music. The next year she left to study ballet in Berlin with Rita Sacchetto. By the age of 16, she had made her debut as a cabaret dancer and in 1917 she was working as a fashion model for Die Dame.

== Notoriety in Berlin ==
Between 1918 and 1925, she appeared in twenty-five films. Richard Oswald used her in a number of his films around this time. In 1920 she appeared alongside Dadaists in a political cabaret called Schall und Rauch.

Scandalously androgynous, she quickly made a name for herself. She wore heavy dancer's make-up, which on the black-and-white photos and films of the time came across as jet black lipstick painted across the heart-shaped part of her skinny lips, and charcoaled eyes. Berber's hair was fashionably cut into a short bob and was frequently bright red, as in 1925 when the German painter Otto Dix painted a portrait of her, titled Portrait of the Dancer Anita Berber.

Her dancer, friend and sometime lover Sebastian Droste, who performed in the film Algol (1920), was thin and had black hair with gelled up curls much like sideburns. Neither of them wore much more than low-slung loincloths and Anita occasionally a corsage, placed well below her breasts.

Berber and Droste collaborated on a book titled Dances of Vice, Horror, and Ecstasy in 1923. Around 1,000 copies were published and even prominent artist Hannah Höch owned a copy.

Berber's dances – which had names such as "Cocaine" and "Morphium" – broke boundaries with their androgyny and total nudity, but it was her public appearances that really challenged social taboos. Berber's overt drug addiction and bisexuality were matters of public gossip. In addition to her addictions to cocaine, opium and morphine, one of Berber's favourite forms of inebriation was chloroform and ether mixed in a bowl. This would be stirred with a white rose, the petals of which she would then eat.

Karl Toepfer contends that no one of this era was "more closely associated with nude dancing than Anita Berber". A contemporary of Berber, choreographer Joe Jencik, described how "The public never appreciated Anita's artistic expression, only her public transgressions in which she trespassed the untouchable line between the stage and the audience. . . . She sacrificed her person to a self-vivisection of her life."

Aside from her addiction to narcotic drugs, Berber was also an alcoholic. In 1928, at the age of 29, she suddenly gave up alcohol completely, but died later the same year. According to Mel Gordon, in The Seven Addictions and Five Professions of Anita Berber: Weimar Berlin's Priestess of Debauchery, she had been diagnosed with severe tuberculosis while performing abroad. After collapsing in Damascus, she returned to Germany and died in a Kreuzberg hospital on 10 November 1928, although rumour had it that she died surrounded by empty morphine syringes. Berber was buried in a pauper's grave in St. Thomas Cemetery in Neukölln.

== Marriages ==
In 1919, Berber entered into a marriage of convenience with a man named Eberhard Phillipp Engelhard von Nathusins. She later left him in order to pursue a relationship with a woman named Susi Wanowski, and became part of the Berlin lesbian scene.

Berber's second marriage, in 1922, was to Sebastian Droste. This lasted until 1923.

In 1925, she married an American dancer named Henri Chatin-Hofmann. They embarked on a tour round Europe ending in Zagreb, Kingdom of Serbs, Croats and Slovenes, after Berber was arrested for insulting the King Alexander I. After Hofmann managed to secure her release, they continued around the Mediterranean and the Middle East.

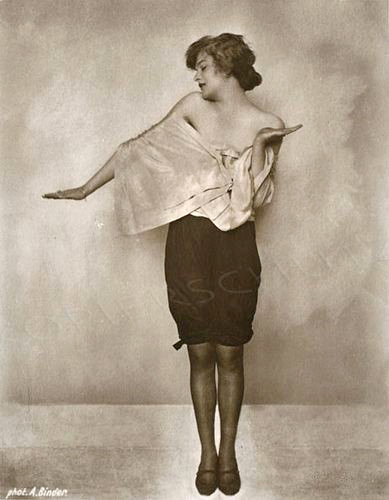
Berber in the 1920s

== In popular culture ==
- A 1987 film by Rosa von Praunheim, Anita - Tänze des Lasters ("Anita - Dances of Vice") focuses on Berber's life.
- The band Death in Vegas named a song on the album Satan's Circus after her. It is frequently used on the NPR radio show This American Life.
- A new Weimar-era musical Fury and Elysium contains a portrayal of Berber, played by Iz Hesketh.

== Selected filmography ==
- The Story of Dida Ibsen (1918)
- Around the World in Eighty Days (1919)
- Different from the Others (1919)
- Prostitution (1919)
- The Skull of Pharaoh's Daughter (1920)
- The Hustler (1920)
- Figures of the Night (1920)
- The Count of Cagliostro (1920)
- The Golden Plague (1921)
- Lucifer (1921)
- Circus People (1922)
- Lucrezia Borgia (1922)
- The Three Marys (1923)
- Vienna, City of Song (1923)
- A Waltz by Strauss (1925)
