= Harry Hardt =

Austrian actor (1899–1980)

Harry Hardt (born Hermann Karl Viktor Klimbacher Edler von Reichswahr, Pula, 4 August 1899 – Vienna, 14 November 1980) was an Austrian actor. The son of a military officer, he initially planned a military career for himself, studying at a military academy and serving during World War I. He later turned to acting, having a long career both in films and on television.

== Selected filmography ==
- The Passion of Inge Krafft (1921)
- The Eternal Struggle (1921)
- The Women of Gnadenstein (1921)
- The False Dimitri (1922) - Fürst Leschinsky
- Frauenmoral (1923)
- Fräulein Raffke (1923)
- The Comedian's Child (1923)
- The Great Unknown (1924)
- The Hobgoblin (1924)
- Around a Million (1924)
- Nanon (1924) - Bruder der Dame (Brother of the Dame)
- The Wife of Forty Years (1925)
- Cock of the Roost (1925)
- Upstairs and Downstairs (1925)
- The Dealer from Amsterdam (1925)
- Ship in Distress (1925)
- In the Name of the Kaisers (1925)
- The Clever Fox (1926)
- Sword and Shield (1926)
- The Uncle from the Provinces (1926)
- The Field Marshal (1927)
- Grand Hotel (1927)
- The White Slave (1927)
- A Murderous Girl (1927)
- Did You Fall in Love Along the Beautiful Rhine? (1927)
- Endangered Girls (1927)
- Children's Souls Accuse You (1927)
- Storm Tide (1927)
- The Woman in the Cupboard (1927)
- The Gypsy Baron (1927)
- Klettermaxe (1927)
- Casanova's Legacy (1928)
- Hungarian Rhapsody (1928)
- Five Anxious Days (1928)
- High Treason (1929)
- The Wonderful Lies of Nina Petrovna (1929)
- What's Wrong with Nanette? (1929)
- The Veil Dancer (1929)
- The Man Without Love (1929)
- Hungarian Nights (1929)
- The Copper (1930)
- Danube Waltz (1930)
- The Citadel of Warsaw (1930)
- The White Devil (1930)
- Grock (1931)
- In the Employ of the Secret Service (1931)
- The Stranger (1931)
- Crime Reporter Holm (1932)
- The Secret of Johann Orth (1932)
- Spoiling the Game (1932)
- The Invisible Front (1932)
- The Naked Truth (1932)
- The Countess of Monte Cristo (1932)
- Under False Flag (1932)
- Happy Days in Aranjuez (1933)
- Spies at Work (1933)
- The Island (1934)
- The Lost Valley (1934)
- At the Strasbourg (1934)
- Gypsy Blood (1934)
- The Old and the Young King (1935)
- If It Were Not for Music (1935)
- My Life for Maria Isabella (1935)
- A Night of Change (1935)
- Uncle Bräsig (1936)
- Escapade (1936)
- The Impossible Woman (1936)
- The Beggar Student (1936)
- The Man Who Was Sherlock Holmes (1937)
- The Chief Witness (1937)
- Signal in the Night (1937)
- Maria Ilona (1939)
- My Aunt, Your Aunt (1939)
- The Scoundrel (1939)
- Falstaff in Vienna (1940)
- Trenck the Pandur (1940)
- A Man Astray (1940)
- Jakko (1941)
- Beloved World (1942)
- The Night in Venice (1942)
- Two Happy People (1943)
- The War of the Oxen (1943)
- Vienna 1910 (1943)
- Viennese Girls (1945)
- Maria Theresa (1951)
- Everything for Father (1953)
- Irene in Trouble (1953)
- Grandstand for General Staff (1953)
- The Emperor Waltz (1953)
- The Eternal Waltz (1954)
- The Silent Angel (1954)
- Sarajevo (1955)
- Espionage (1955)
- Marianne of My Youth (1955)
- The Royal Waltz (1955)
- Made in Germany (1957)
- Our Crazy Aunts (1961)
- Come to Vienna, I'll Show You Something! (1970)
- The Mimosa Wants to Blossom Too (1976)
- Derrick - Season 05, Episode 03: "Abendfrieden" (1978)
- Egon Schiele – Exzess und Bestrafung (1980)
