= Andrea Rau =

German actress and producer (born 1947)

Andrea Rau (born 1947 in Stuttgart, Germany) is a German actress and producer who has appeared in several German films as well as appearing in the television series Derrick.

Her best-known film appearance was in the 1971 Belgian erotic vampire thriller Daughters of Darkness. She appeared on the cover of a large numbers of magazines such as Mayfair, Penthouse, Wochenend or Neue Revue between 1969 and 1978.

== Selected filmography ==
- Quartett im Bett (1968)
- Charley's Uncle (1969)
- Why Did I Ever Say Yes Twice? (1969)
- Hotel by the Hour (1970)
- Come to Vienna, I'll Show You Something! (1970)
- When the Mad Aunts Arrive (1970)
- Jailbreak in Hamburg (1971)
- Daughters of Darkness (1971)
- Eins (1971)
- Sergeant Berry (1974–1975, TV series)
- Lola (1974)
- Derrick - Season 1, Episode 3: "Stiftungsfest" (1974, TV)
- The Net (1975)
- The Expulsion from Paradise (1977)
- Es muss nicht immer Kaviar sein (1977, TV miniseries)
- Kreisbrandmeister Felix Martin (1982, TV series)
