= Werner Bohne =

German cinematographer

- Born: 25 September 1895; Rudna, German Empire
- Died: 9 April 1940 (aged 44); Drøbak Sound, Oslofjord, Norway
- Cause of death: Killed in action
- Occupation: Cinematographer
- Years active: 1925–1940 (film)
- Military career
- Allegiance: Nazi Germany
- Branch: Kriegsmarine
- Service years: -1940
- Conflicts: Second World War: Norwegian campaign; Operation Weserübung; Battle of Drøbak Sound †

Werner Bohne (25 September 1895 – 9 April 1940) was a German cinematographer of the Weimar and Nazi eras. He was killed in 1940, while working on a propaganda documentary during a battle as part of the invasion of Norway.

== Selected filmography ==
- Ship in Distress (1925)
- Frisian Blood (1925)
- Our Emden (1926)
- Eternal Allegiance (1926)
- Light Cavalry (1927)
- A Love, A Thief, A Department Store (1928)
- The Stolen Face (1930)
- Susanne Cleans Up (1930)
- A Shot at Dawn (1932)
- A Mad Idea (1932)
- The Cheeky Devil (1932)
- You Will Be My Wife (1932)
- Spoiling the Game (1932)
- Inge and the Millions (1933)
- A Door Opens (1933)
- A Night in Venice (1934)
- Gold (1934)
- Amphitryon (1935)
- Ewiger Wald (1936)
- The Unknown (1936)
- Maria the Maid (1936)
- Tomfoolery (1936)
- Land of Love (1937)
- Serenade (1937)
- The Model Husband (1937)
- Anna Favetti (1938)
- The Man Who Couldn't Say No (1938)
- The Deruga Case (1938)
- Her First Experience (1939)
- The Sensational Casilla Trial (1939)
- Three Fathers for Anna (1939)
- Hotel Sacher (1939)

== Bibliography ==
- Youngkin, Stephen. The Lost One: A Life of Peter Lorre. University Press of Kentucky, 2005.
