= Grock (film) =

1931 film directed by Carl Boese

- Directed by: Carl Boese
- Written by: Eduard Behrens; Grock
- Starring: Grock; Liane Haid; Betty Bird
- Cinematography: Frederik Fuglsang; Hans Karl Gottschalk
- Music by: Artur Guttmann
- Production company: Cinema Film
- Distributed by: Siegel-Monopolfilm
- Release date: 24 February 1931
- Running time: 98 minutes
- Country: Germany
- Language: German

Grock is a 1931 German drama film directed by Carl Boese and starring Grock, Liane Haid, and Betty Bird. Grock, a famous circus performer, appears as himself.

The film's sets were designed by the art director Robert Neppach. A separate French-language version was also released.

== Cast ==
- Grock as Grock, himself
- Liane Haid as Bianca, seine Frau
- Betty Bird as Ines, seine Assistantin
- Max van Embden as Max van Embden, sein Partner, himself
- Harry Hardt as Graf Wettach
- Gyula Szőreghy as Der Garderobier
- Fritz Alberti as Der Auktionator
- Philipp Manning as Ein Amerikaner
- Adolf E. Licho as 1. Nichtkäufer
- Ernõ Szenes as 2. Nichtkäufer
- Paul Hörbiger as Ein ungeschickter Geldsucher
- Kurt Lilien as 1. Varietédirektor
- Julius Falkenstein as 2. Varietédirektor
- Heinz Marlow as Ein Zirkusdirektor
- Hugo Fischer-Köppe as Artist
- Gerhard Dammann as Artist
- Raffles Bill as Artist

== Bibliography ==
- Grange, William (2008). Cultural Chronicle of the Weimar Republic. Scarecrow Press. ISBN 978-0-8108-5967-8.
