= Sweet Pepper (film) =

1929 film

- Directed by: Fred Sauer
- Written by: Jane Bess (writer); Geoffrey Moss (novel); Fred Sauer
- Starring: Paul Richter; Eve Gray; Margit Manstad
- Cinematography: Károly Vass
- Production company: Orplid-Film
- Distributed by: Messtro-Orplid
- Release date: 25 January 1929
- Country: Germany
- Languages: Silent; German intertitles

Sweet Pepper (German title: Lockendes Gift) is a 1929 German silent film directed by Fred Sauer and starring Paul Richter, Eve Gray and Margit Manstad.

The art direction was by Franz Schroedter.

== Cast ==
- Paul Richter
- Eve Gray
- Margit Manstad
- Ressel Orla

== Bibliography ==
- Quinlan, David. Quinlan's Film Stars. Batsford, 2000.
