= Heidy Bohlen =

German actress

Heidy Bohlen (born 6 September 1945) is a German film actress.

== Filmography ==
Year	Title	Role	Notes
1967	The Peking Medallion	Jasmine	Uncredited
1969	Dead Body on Broadway	Cindy Holden	
1969	Charley's Uncle	Lilo Freddersen	
1969	Naughty Roommates	Lynn	
1971	The Long Swift Sword of Siegfried	Brunhild	
1971	Jailbreak in Hamburg	Liliane Berndorf	
1971	The Honest Interview	Candida	
1972	The Sensuous Three	Ria	
1974	Les bidasses s'en vont en guerre	La psychologue	(final film role)
