= Endangered Girls (1928 film) =

1928 film directed by Hans Otto

- Directed by: Hans Otto
- Written by: Hans Otto
- Produced by: Hans Otto
- Starring: Max Landa; Cilly Feindt; Hermine Sterler
- Production companies: Feindt-Film; Ottol-Film
- Release date: 6 April 1928
- Country: Austria
- Languages: Silent; German intertitles

Endangered Girls (German: Gefährdete Mädchen) is a 1928 Austrian silent drama film directed by Hans Otto and starring Max Landa, Cilly Feindt and Hermine Sterler.

== Cast ==
- Max Landa
- Cilly Feindt
- Hermine Sterler
- Margot Landa
- Leon Epp
- Hans Mierendorff
- Viktor Franz
- Livio Pavanelli
- Albert von Kersten
- Fritz Spira
- Karl Noll

== Bibliography ==
- Robert Von Dassanowsky. Austrian Cinema: A History. McFarland, 2005.
