= Joseph Amiel =

American attorney and novelist (born 1937)

- Born: June 3, 1937 (age 89); New York City
- Education: Amherst College; Yale Law School
- Occupations: Attorney, Novelist and Screenwriter

Joseph Amiel (born June 3, 1937, New York City) is an American attorney, novelist and screenwriter. He attended the Fieldston School in New York City and graduated from Amherst College in 1959; he received an LL.B. degree from Yale Law School in 1962.

The Archives and Special Collections at Amherst College holds his papers.

== Works ==
=== Screenplays ===
- Daughters of Darkness (1971)
- The Hunted (1974)

=== Novels ===
- Hawks. Putnam. 1979. ISBN 0-399-12312-1.
- Birthright. Atheneum. 1985. ISBN 0-241-11507-8.
- Deeds. Hamish Hamilton. 1988. ISBN 0-241-12471-9.
- Star Time. Crown. 1991. ISBN 0-517-57519-1.
- A Question of Proof. Random House. 1993. ISBN 0-517-15705-5.
