= Cilly Feindt =

German circus performer and stage/film actress

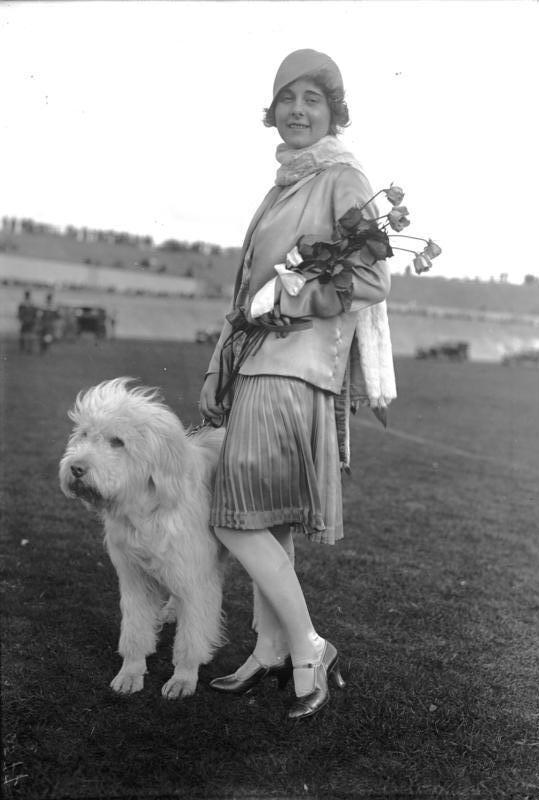
- Feindt in 1928
- Born: 8 April 1909; Berlin, German Empire
- Died: 21 August 1999 (aged 90); Los Angeles, United States
- Occupations: Actress, Circus performer
- Years active: 1925–1962 (film)

Cilly Feindt (1909–1999) was a German circus performer, stage and film actress.

== Selected filmography ==
- The Circus Princess (1925)
- The Field Marshal (1927)
- A Murderous Girl (1927)
- Endangered Girls (1928)
- The Circus Princess (1929)
- The Leap into the Void (1932)
- Holiday From Myself (1934)
- Light Cavalry (1935)
- Two Weeks in Another Town (1962)

== Bibliography ==
- Perry, Joe. Christmas in Germany: A Cultural History. University of North Carolina Press, 2010.
