= A Woman for 24 Hours =

1925 film

- Directed by: Reinhold Schünzel
- Written by: Alexander Engel (novella); Alfred Schirokauer; Reinhold Schünzel
- Starring: Lotte Neumann; Harry Liedtke; Kurt Vespermann
- Cinematography: Emil Schünemann
- Production company: Victor Klein-Film
- Distributed by: Bavaria Film
- Release date: 24 November 1925
- Country: Germany
- Languages: Silent; German intertitles

A Woman for 24 Hours (German:Die Frau für 24 Stunden) is a 1925 German silent drama film directed by Reinhold Schünzel and starring Lotte Neumann, Harry Liedtke and Kurt Vespermann.

The film's art direction was by Kurt Richter.

== Cast ==
- Lotte Neumann as Olga
- Harry Liedtke as Graf Cola
- Kurt Vespermann as Emil Springer
- Hugo Werner-Kahle as von Daum
- Max Kronert as Botschafter
- Maria Kamradek as Käte Kurz
- Hadrian Maria Netto as Baron Korff
- Sig Arno as Gebrüder Schick
- Bruno Arno as Gebrüder Schick

== Bibliography ==
- Grange, William. Cultural Chronicle of the Weimar Republic. Scarecrow Press, 2008.
