= Philipp Manning =

German actor

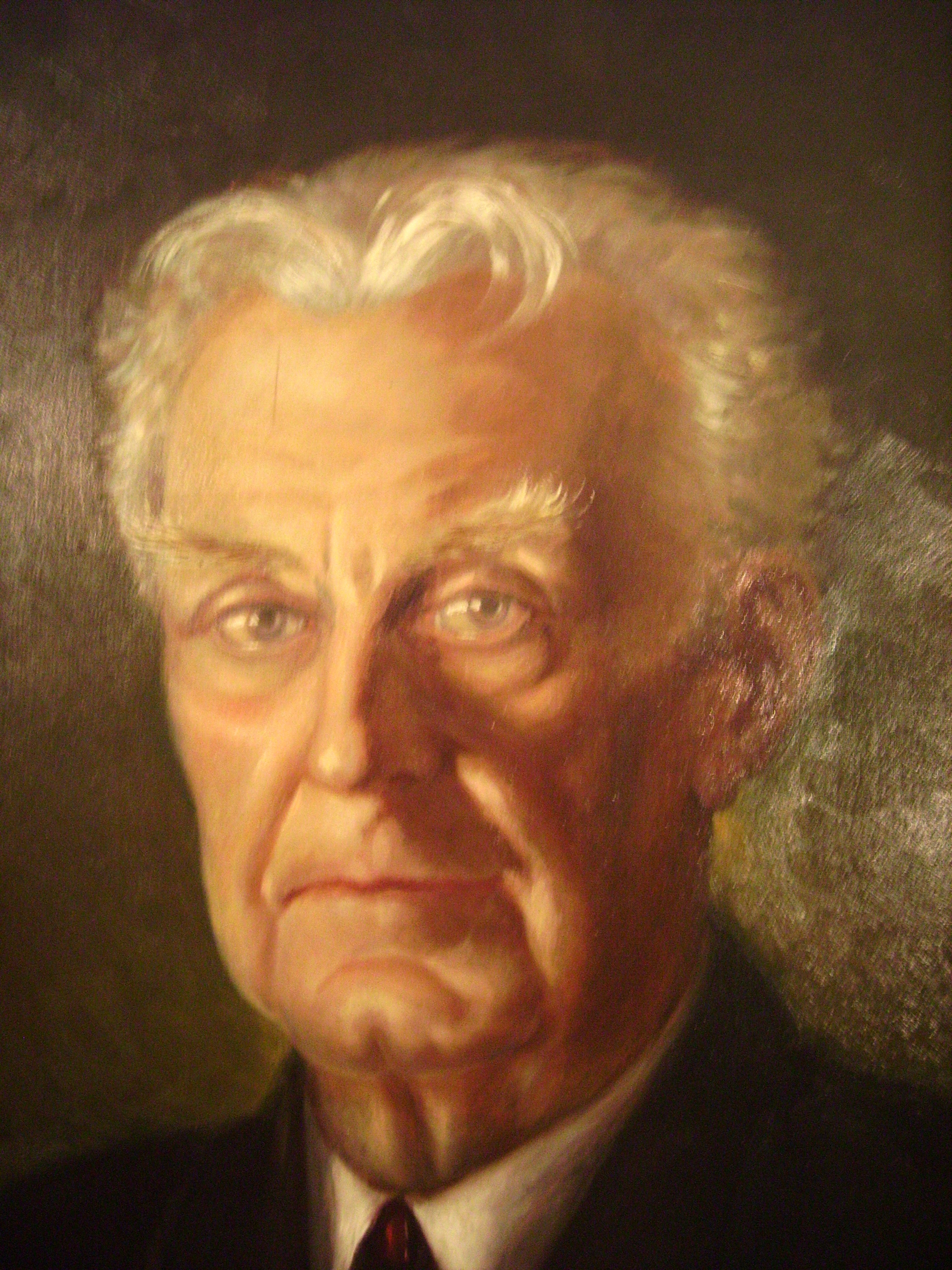
Philipp Manning

Philipp Manning (23 November 1869 – 9 April 1951) was a British-born German actor. He was born in Lewisham to a British father and a German mother. He was sent to Germany for his education and settled there. He often played British characters in German films, including in Nazi propaganda ones. He died in Waldshut-Tiengen.

== Selected filmography ==
- Circus of Life (1921)
- The Inheritance (1922)
- Lucrezia Borgia (1922)
- Rose of the Asphalt Streets (1922)
- The Ancient Law (1923)
- Friedrich Schiller (1923)
- The Comedian's Child (1923)
- Time Is Money (1923)
- Heart of Stone (1924)
- Dudu, a Human Destiny (1924)
- Darling of the King (1924)
- Bismarck (1925)
- Express Train of Love (1925)
- Ship in Distress (1925)
- Shadows of the Metropolis (1925)
- Frisian Blood (1925)
- Superfluous People (1926)
- The Woman's Crusade (1926)
- Professor Imhof (1926)
- Love's Joys and Woes (1926)
- Maytime (1926)
- The Young Man from the Ragtrade (1926)
- Chance the Idol (1927)
- German Women - German Faithfulness (1927)
- Did You Fall in Love Along the Beautiful Rhine? (1927)
- Klettermaxe (1927)
- The Man with the Counterfeit Money (1927)
- Storm Tide (1927)
- Eva and the Grasshopper (1927)
- The Impostor (1927)
- The Tragedy of a Lost Soul (1927)
- The Lady and the Chauffeur (1928)
- Spy of Madame Pompadour (1928)
- Master and Mistress (1928)
- His Strongest Weapon (1928)
- Man Against Man (1928)
- Behind Monastery Walls (1928)
- Volga Volga (1928)
- Panic (1928)
- I Lost My Heart on a Bus (1929)
- The Love of the Brothers Rott (1929)
- Midnight Taxi (1929)
- Painted Youth (1929)
- Atlantik (1929)
- Land Without Women (1929)
- His Best Friend (1929)
- Napoleon at St. Helena (1929)
- The Last Company (1930)
- Father and Son (1930)
- A Student's Song of Heidelberg (1930)
- Police Spy 77 (1930)
- Woman in the Jungle (1931)
- Moritz Makes his Fortune (1931)
- The Adventurer of Tunis (1931)
- A Storm Over Zakopane (1931)
- Grock (1931)
- Congress Dances (1932)
- The White Demon (1932)
- The Dancer of Sanssouci (1932)
- Marshal Forwards (1932)
- The Escape to Nice (1932)
- Ship Without a Harbour (1932)
- Today Is the Day (1933)
- The Legacy of Pretoria (1934)
- Miss Liselott (1934)
- The World Without a Mask (1934)
- A Night on the Danube (1935)
- The Schimeck Family (1935)
- City of Anatol (1936)
- Stjenka Rasin (1936)
- The Call of the Jungle (1936)
- A Woman of No Importance (1936)
- Gewitterflug zu Claudia (1937)
- His Best Friend (1937)
- Woman's Love—Woman's Suffering (1937)
- Storms in May (1938)
- Men, Animals and Sensations (1938)
- Rubber (1938)
- Robert Koch (1939)
- Carl Peters (1941)
- Secret File W.B.1 (1942)
- The Endless Road (1943)

== Bibliography ==
- Eisner, Lotte H. The Haunted Screen: Expressionism in the German Cinema and the Influence of Max Reinhardt. University of California Press, 2008.
