= Paul Helwig =

German stage manager and script-writer

Paul Julius Adolf Helwig (27 May 1893 – 7 August 1963) was a German stage-manager, script-writer, philosopher and psychologist, who has contributed in an original way to the analysis of human behavior. He was born in Lübeck, Germany, and died in Munich.

His psychological approach has as a starting-point the chains of reactions and events which normally result from acting, and in which one remains involved because they present one possibilities to seize, problems to solve as well as challenges to take. This is typical for the literary drama, but can be seen in a less concentrated way in daily life. Problematic, if not pathological, behavior may arise if conditions for starting and continuing such a "drama of life" are insufficiently met. One of those conditions, the main one, is what Helwig calls "resistance": the resistance the physical and social environment offer to one's aims. If it is too much acting will be blocked, if it is too small action will be short-lived and be in want of intensity and impact.

Helwig characterizes his approach both as dramaturgical (1958) and behavioristic (1964), the latter because overt behavior is seen as the primary phenomenon, to be explained from the interaction action-environment instead of hypothetical inner forces and features. His "behaviorism" starts, however, from very molar behavior units, unlike American behaviorism.

== Works by Paul Helwig ==
=== Philosophical-psychological work ===
- Helwig, P. (1934): Die individuelle Relation. (Ein Beitrag zur Dialektik der Selbstheit). Universität Köln: thesis. 38 pages
- Helwig, P. (1936): Seele als Äusserung. Untersuchungen zur Leib-Seele Problematik. Leipzig en Berlijn: Teubner Verlag. 124 pages (Mind as expression. Explorations of the body-mind relation)
- Helwig, P. (1936): Charakterologie. Leipzig: Teubner Verlag.
- Helwig, P. (1951): Charakterologie. 2nd revised edition. Stuttgartt: Klett Verlag.
- Helwig, P. (1965): Charakterologie. 3rd revised edition. Stuttgartt: Klett Verlag. (Afterwards more than once reprinted in Herder-Bücherei.)
- Helwig, P. (1953): Die gewünschte und die gewollte Welt. Zur psychologischen Charakterisierung des Hysterikers und des Zwangsneurotikers. Psyche, VI, 10. Heft, p. 561-576. (Passive desiring vs. active willing. On the psychological characterization of the hysterical and the compulsive patient.)
- Helwig, P. (1958): Dramaturgie des menslichen Lebens. Stuttgart: Klett. (Dramaturgy of human existence.)
- Helwig, P. (1961): Psychologie ohne Magie. Der Mensch im Spannungsgefüge der Lebensdramatiek. München/Basel: Reinhardt. (Psychology without magic. Man in the texture of the drama of life.)
- Helwig, P. (1964): Liebe und Feindschaft. München/Basel: Reinhardt. (Posthumous.) (Love and hostility.)

=== Plays ===
(list may not be complete)

- 1922: Das Eichenacher Spiel von der zehn Jungfrauen. Für die Aufführung im Juli, 1921, neu übersetzt und scenisch bearbeitet von Conrad Höfer und Paul Helwig. Verlag: Rahle, Eisenach, 1922.
- 1938: Flitterwochen.
- 1939: Irrfahrt der Wünsche.
- 1939: Am helllichten Tag. Berlin: Drei Masken Verlag (1942?).
- 1940: Götter auf Urlaub. Berlin: Drei Masken Verlag.
- 1941: Der Barbar: eine historische Tragikomödie in 5 Aufzügen. Berlin: Drei Masken Verlag.
- 1942: Schwarze Magie: Lustspiel in 3 Auzügen. Berlin: Drei Masken Verlag.
- 1942: Die schöne Maria: Historische Komödie in 5 Aufzüge. Berlin: Drei Masken Verlag.
- 1942: Lucille und Orleans: Eine dramatische Romanze in 5 Aufzüge. Berlin: Drei Masken Verlag.
- 1942: Des Ruhmes und der Liebe Schwert: Eine dramatische Romanze in 5 Aufzüge. Berlin: Drei Masken Verlag.
- 1943: Krampus und Angelika: Komödie in 3 Aufzüge un 1 Vorspiel. Berlin: Drei Masken Verlag.
- 1947: Jupiter: Komödie in 3 Aufzüge. (Deutsche bearbeitung von Rober Boissy). Berlin: Drei Masken Verlag.
- 1947: Familie Professor Linden. Deutsche Bearbeitung von "The Linden Tree" von J.B. Priestley. Berlin: Drei Masken Verlag (1948).
- 1948: Die neue Stadt: Ein Spiel in 3 Aufzüge. Deutsche Bearbeitung von John Boynton. Berlin: Drei Masken Verlag.
- 1948: Hier bin ich schon einmal gewesen: Schauspiel in 3 Aufzüge. Deutsche Bearbeitung von John Boynton. Berlin: Drei Masken Verlag.
- 1949: Ernst Beiseite: Lustspiel in 3 Auzügen. Hamburg: Die Rampe, Bühnenvertrieb GmbH.
- 1958: Die fremde Stadt. Übersetzung eines Spiel in 3 Aufzüge von J.B. Priestley. Weinheim: Dt. Laienspiel-Verlag.

=== Films ===
(list may be incomplete; in 1943 en '44 he was involved in making movies in Vienna and Prague)

- 1925: The Story of Lilian Hawley. Scenario.
- 1939: Mein Mann darf es nicht wissen. Verfilming van Flitterwochen.
- 1940: Das leichte Mädchen. Scenario samen met Fritz Peter Buch.
- 1954: Bon Voyage. Scenario samen met Herbert Witt. Naar de gelijknamige Operette von Eduard Künneke
- 1954: The Man of My Life. Scenario (literatuurverfilming).
- 1955: Swedish Girl. Scenario met Ursula Bloy.
- 1955: Love Without Illusions. Dialogen.
- 1956: Nichts als Ärger mit der Liebe. Scenario met Heinz Oskar Wuttig.
- 1957: A Piece of Heaven. Scenario met Juliane Kay.

=== Otherwise ===
(list perhaps not complete)

- 1941: Jerika. Novel. Wien-Leipzig: Alfred Ibach Verlag.
- 1962: Pan - Pan - Potiphar: Die abstrakte Lyrik meines Vetters Alois Zeitvogel. Poems. Nürnberg: Glock und Lutz.

Nonsensical poems, which he pretends to stem from the heritage of a distant cousin, with a great many neologisms.
