= Charley's Uncle =

1969 film

- Directed by: Werner Jacobs
- Written by: Kurt Nachmann
- Produced by: Heinz Willeg
- Starring: Gila von Weitershausen; Karl Michael Vogler; Heidy Bohlen
- Cinematography: Werner Kurz
- Music by: Raimund Rosenberger
- Production companies: Allianz Filmproduktion; Terra-Filmkunst
- Distributed by: Constantin Film
- Release date: 18 April 1969
- Running time: 93 minutes
- Country: West Germany
- Language: German

Charley's Uncle (German: Charleys Onkel) is a 1969 West German comedy film directed by Werner Jacobs and starring Gila von Weitershausen, Karl Michael Vogler and Heidy Bohlen. The film was a loose adaptation of Brandon Thomas' 1892 play Charley's Aunt and depicts the bond between a young woman and her uncle.

== Main cast ==
- Gila von Weitershausen as Carla Werner
- Karl Michael Vogler as Boy Deisen
- Gustav Knuth as Kapitän Johann Tressplake
- Erna Sellmer as Cornelia Tressplake
- Gunther Philipp as Dr. Alfred Krusius
- Hubert von Meyerinck as Fahrschulbesitzer
- Heidy Bohlen as Lilo Freddersen
- Heinz Erhardt as Vertreter
- Willy Millowitsch as Herr Rüttersbusch
- Ralf Wolter as Polizist
- Edith Hancke as Helga
- Rudolf Schündler as Dr. Brunn
- Loni Heuser as Frau Müggel
- Achim Strietzel as Sonny
- Andrea Rau as Dottie
- Karl Dall as Kneipenmusiker
- Karel Gott

== Bibliography ==
- Hans-Michael Bock and Tim Bergfelder. The Concise Cinegraph: An Encyclopedia of German Cinema. Berghahn Books, 2009.
