= The Eternal Struggle (1921 film) =

1921 film

- German: Der ewige Kampf
- Directed by: Paul L. Stein
- Written by: Otto Krack
- Produced by: Paul Davidson
- Starring: Lotte Neumann; Alfons Fryland; Harry Hardt
- Cinematography: Carl Drews
- Production company: PAGU
- Distributed by: UFA
- Release date: 27 October 1921
- Country: Germany
- Languages: Silent; German intertitles

The Eternal Struggle (German: Der ewige Kampf) is a 1921 German silent drama film directed by Paul L. Stein and starring Lotte Neumann, Alfons Fryland, and Harry Hardt.

The film's sets were designed by the art director Robert Neppach.

== Cast ==
- Lotte Neumann as Antje
- Alfons Fryland as Vermeer
- Harry Hardt as Pieter
- Johannes Riemann as van Tollen
- Gustav Botz as old Deken
- Sophie Pagay as Deken's wife
- Hans Junkermann as Smissen
- Karl Platen as Diener
