= The Comedian's Child =

1923 film

- Directed by: Fred Sauer
- Written by: Fred Sauer; Walter Wassermann
- Starring: Harry Hardt; Robert Leffler; Grete Reinwald
- Cinematography: Heinrich Gärtner
- Production company: Hermes-Film
- Distributed by: UFA
- Release date: 12 January 1923
- Country: Germany
- Languages: Silent; German intertitles

The Comedian's Child (German:Das Komödiantenkind) is a 1923 German silent film directed by Fred Sauer and starring Harry Hardt, Robert Leffler and Grete Reinwald.

== Cast ==
- Harry Hardt
- Robert Leffler
- Grete Reinwald
- Frick Sievers
- Philipp Manning
- Gustav Trautschold

== Bibliography ==
- Grange, William. Cultural Chronicle of the Weimar Republic. Scarecrow Press, 2008.
