= Mystery About Beate =

1938 film

- Directed by: Johannes Meyer
- Written by: Lotte Neumann; Walter Wassermann
- Based on: Rätsel um Beate by Alfred Möller and Hans Lorenz
- Produced by: Ernst Garden
- Starring: Lil Dagover; Albrecht Schoenhals; Sabine Peters
- Cinematography: Oskar Schnirch
- Edited by: Helmuth Schönnenbeck
- Music by: Peter Kreuder
- Production company: Cine-Allianz
- Distributed by: Panorama Film
- Release date: 4 February 1938
- Running time: 86 minutes
- Country: Germany
- Language: German

Mystery About Beate (German: Rätsel um Beate) is a 1938 German drama film directed by Johannes Meyer and starring Lil Dagover, Albrecht Schoenhals and Sabine Peters. It was shot at the Tempelhof Studios in Berlin. The film's sets were designed by the art directors Gustav A. Knauer and Alexander Mügge.

== Cast ==
- Lil Dagover as Beate Kaiserling
- Albrecht Schoenhals as Dr. Normann
- Sabine Peters as Ursula v. Pöttkamp
- Käthe Haack as Frieda, Mädchen bei Beate
- Fritz Odemar as Konsul Dieckhoff
- Walter Steinbeck as A. V. Pöttkamp
- Erich Fiedler as Elimar Dieckhoff
- Ernst Waldow as Dr. Liborius
- Julia Serda as Tante Mary
- Hans Leibelt as August Deinhard
- Otto Wernicke as Vater Hübner - Schmied
- Ingeborg von Kusserow as Schauspielerin, 1.Etage
- Erik Ode as Schauspieler, 1.Etage
- Paul Westermeier as Fabriksarbeiter und Meister
- Erika von Thellmann as Frl. von Hasse
- Werner Schott as Direktor Koch
- Wilhelm König as Heinz Hübner - Sohn
- Olga Limburg as 1. Dame
- Claire Reigbert as 2. Dame
- Flita von Uhl as 3. Dame
- Else Bötticher as 4. Dame
- Egon Brosig as Glatzkopf

== Bibliography ==
- Goble, Alan. The Complete Index to Literary Sources in Film. Walter de Gruyter, 1999.
- Klaus, Ulrich J. Deutsche Tonfilme: Jahrgang 1938. Klaus-Archiv, 1988.
- Waldman, Harry. Nazi Films in America, 1933-1942. McFarland, 2008.
