= Gerda Maurus =

Austrian actress

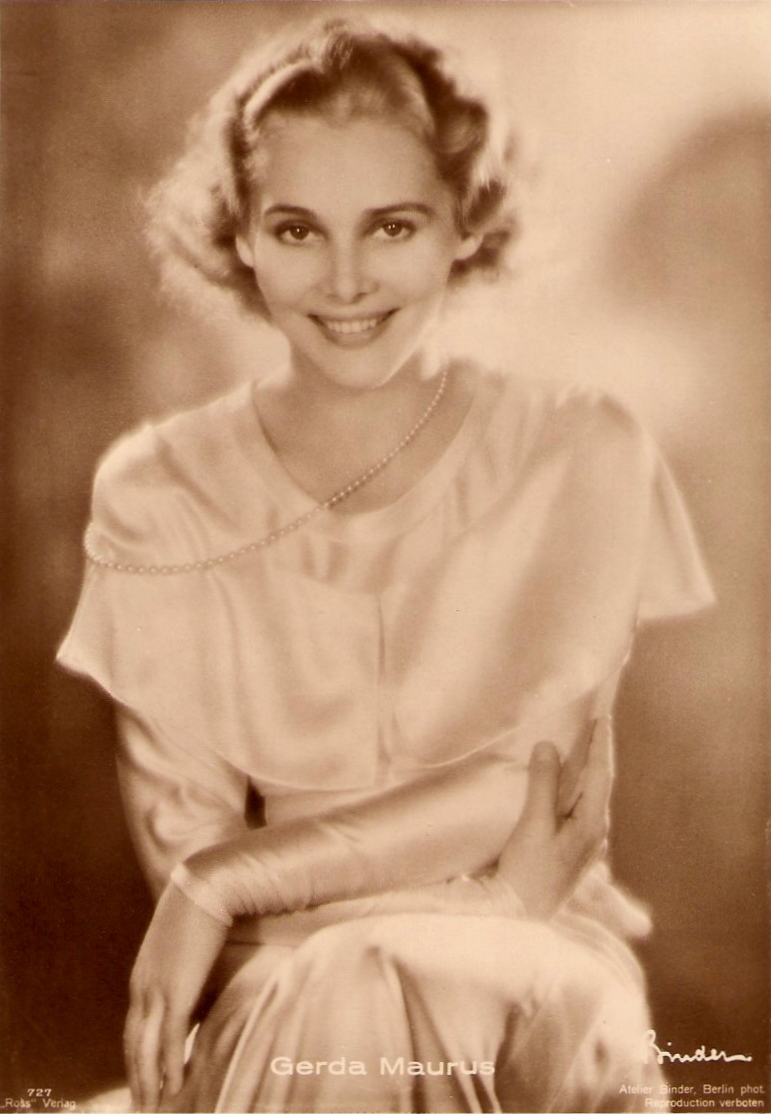
- Born: 25 August 1903; Breitenfurt bei Wien, Austro-Hungarian Empire
- Died: 31 July 1968 (aged 64); Düsseldorf, West Germany
- Occupation: actress
- Years active: 1928–1968 (film & TV)

Signature
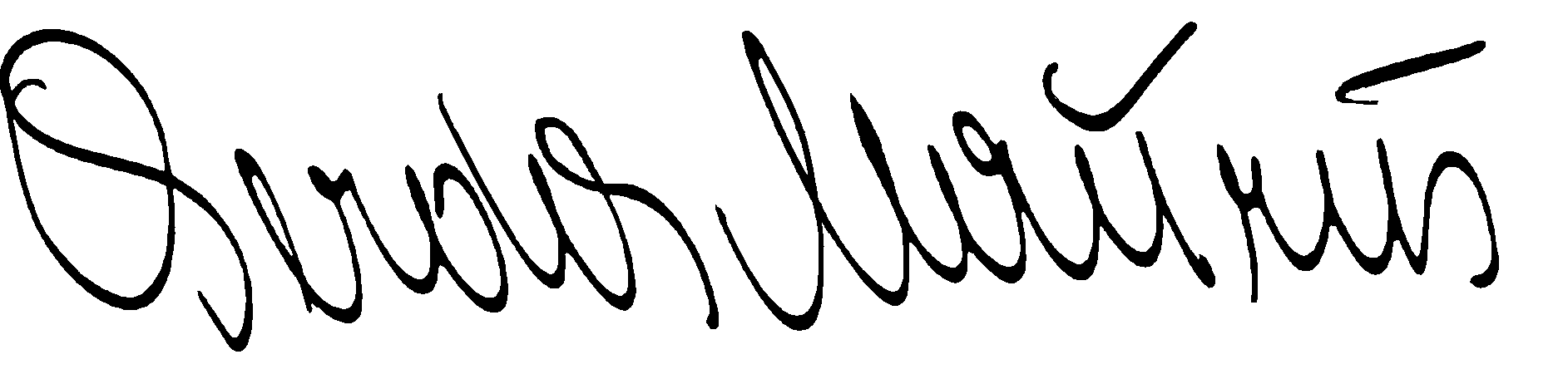

Gerda Maurus (25 August 1903 – 31 July 1968) was an Austrian actress.

She was of Croatian descent and initially made her name on stage in Vienna. While performing in the theatre, she was discovered by the director Fritz Lang during a visit to his native city. Lang cast her in the female lead in his silent thriller film Spione (1928) and she appeared in a number of German films during the Weimar and Nazi eras.

== Selected filmography ==
- Spione (1928)
- Frau im Mond (1929)
- High Treason (1929)
- The Shot in the Sound Film Studio (1930)
- The Daredevil (1931)
- Alarm at Midnight (1931)
- The Stranger (1931)
- Checkmate (1931)
- Death Over Shanghai (1932)
- The White Demon (1932)
- Invisible Opponent (1933)
- The Double (1934)
- A Woman With Power of Attorney (1934)
- The Cossack and the Nightingale (1935)
- The Call of the Jungle (1936)
- A Doctor of Conviction (1936)
- Daphne and the Diplomat (1937)
- My Wife's Friends (1949)
- The Little Town Will Go to Sleep (1954)

== Bibliography ==
- McGilligan, Patrick (1997). Fritz Lang: The Nature of the Beast. New York: St. Martin's Press. ISBN 978-0-312-13247-7.
