= The Awakening of Woman =

1927 film

- Directed by: Fred Sauer
- Written by: Fred Sauer; Curt Thomalla; Walter Wassermann
- Produced by: Josef Stein
- Starring: Grete Mosheim; Hilde Maroff; Hermann Vallentin
- Cinematography: Willy Goldberger
- Music by: Walter Ulfig
- Production company: Domo-Strauß-Film
- Distributed by: Rofa-Film
- Release date: 13 October 1927
- Country: Germany
- Languages: Silent; German intertitles

The Awakening of Woman (German: Das Erwachen des Weibes) is a 1927 German silent comedy film directed by Fred Sauer and starring Grete Mosheim, Hilde Maroff, and Hermann Vallentin.

The film's sets were designed by the art director Kurt Richter.

== Cast ==
- Grete Mosheim as Frida Ponath
- Hilde Maroff as Emma Ponath
- Hermann Vallentin as Vater Ponath, Portier
- Hugo Werner-Kahle as Wille, Hausbesitzer
- Wolfgang Zilzer as Fritz Wille, Sohn
- Harry Lamberts-Paulsen as Theodor Neumann
- Lydia Potechina as Witwe Maaß
- Hermann Picha as Sekretär Kraatz
- Margarete Kupfer as Frau Kraatz
- Sybill Morel as Fräulein Seibke
- Barbara von Annenkoff as Eine Ärztin
- Frieda Lehndorf as Frau Wille

== Bibliography ==
- Grange, William (2008). Cultural Chronicle of the Weimar Republic. Lanham, MD: Scarecrow Press. ISBN 978-0-8108-5967-8.
