= The Good Reputation =

1926 film

- Directed by: Pierre Marodon
- Written by: Hermann Sudermann (book); Walter Wassermann
- Starring: Lotte Neumann; Hans Mierendorff; Germaine Rouer
- Cinematography: Willy Goldberger
- Production companies: Hermes-Film; UFA
- Distributed by: UFA
- Release date: 21 October 1926
- Countries: France; Germany
- Languages: Silent; German intertitles

The Good Reputation (French: La bonne réputation, German: Der gute Ruf) is a 1926 French-German silent drama film directed by Pierre Marodon and starring Lotte Neumann, Hans Mierendorff and Germaine Rouer.

The film's sets were designed by Willi Herrmann.

== Cast ==
- Lotte Neumann as Marguerite de Tanna
- Hans Mierendorff
- Germaine Rouer as Thérèse Walcourt
- Henri Baudin as Le baron de Tanna
- Olga Engl
- Olga Limburg
- Jakob Tiedtke
- Eduard von Winterstein
- Léon Bary as Max de Termonde
- Régine Bouet
- Rudolf Lettinger
- Traute Tinius
- Alfred Haase
- Georg H. Schnell
- Sascha Bragowa
- Sophie Pagay
- Wilhelm Chandron
- Robert Leffler
- Gustav Adolf Semler
- Maria Forescu

== Bibliography ==
- Grange, William. Cultural Chronicle of the Weimar Republic. Scarecrow Press, 2008.
