= Tragedy (1925 film) =

1925 film directed by Carl Froelich

- Directed by: Carl Froelich
- Written by: Fred Sauer; Walter Wassermann
- Produced by: Carl Froelich; Henny Porten; Wilhelm von Kaufmann
- Starring: Walter Janssen; Henny Porten; Annemarie Winkler
- Cinematography: Axel Graatkjær
- Production company: Henny Porten-Froelich-Produktion
- Distributed by: Filmhaus Bruckmann
- Release date: 30 November 1925
- Country: Germany
- Languages: Silent; German intertitles

Tragedy (German: Tragödie) is a 1925 German silent drama film directed by Carl Froelich and starring Walter Janssen, Henny Porten and Annemarie Winkler.

The film's sets were designed by the art director Franz Schroedter.

== Cast ==
- Walter Janssen as Graf Tamar
- Henny Porten as Gräfin Maria Tamar
- Annemarie Winkler as Komtesse Monica, beider Töchterchen
- Lina Lossen as Komtesse Antonie Tamar, Schwester des Grafen
- Robert Scholz as Jean Guiscard, Dichter
- Robert Garrison as Pickart, Verleger
- Eberhard Leithoff as Erik Lindholm, ein Schreiber
- Jaro Fürth

== Bibliography ==
- Bock, Hans-Michael & Bergfelder, Tim. The Concise CineGraph. Encyclopedia of German Cinema. Berghahn Books, 2009.
