= Lina Lossen =

German actress (1878–1959)

- Born: Caroline Elisabeth Lossen; 7 October 1878; Dresden, German Empire
- Died: 30 January 1959 (aged 80); West Berlin, West Germany
- Occupation: Actress
- Years active: 1899–1945

Lina Lossen (born Caroline Elisabeth Lossen; 7 October 1878 – 30 January 1959) was a German stage and film actress.

== Selected filmography ==
- Peer Gynt (1919)
- The Forbidden Way (1920)
- Miss Julie (1922)
- Love's Finale (1925)
- Tragedy (1925)
- The Trial of Donald Westhof (1927)
- To New Shores (1937)
- Serenade (1937)
- The Fourth Is Not Coming (1939)
- The Strange Woman (1939)
- Friedemann Bach (1941)

== Bibliography ==
- Soister, John T. Conrad Veidt on Screen: A Comprehensive Illustrated Filmography. McFarland, 2002.
