= Gaspard Adolphe Chatin =

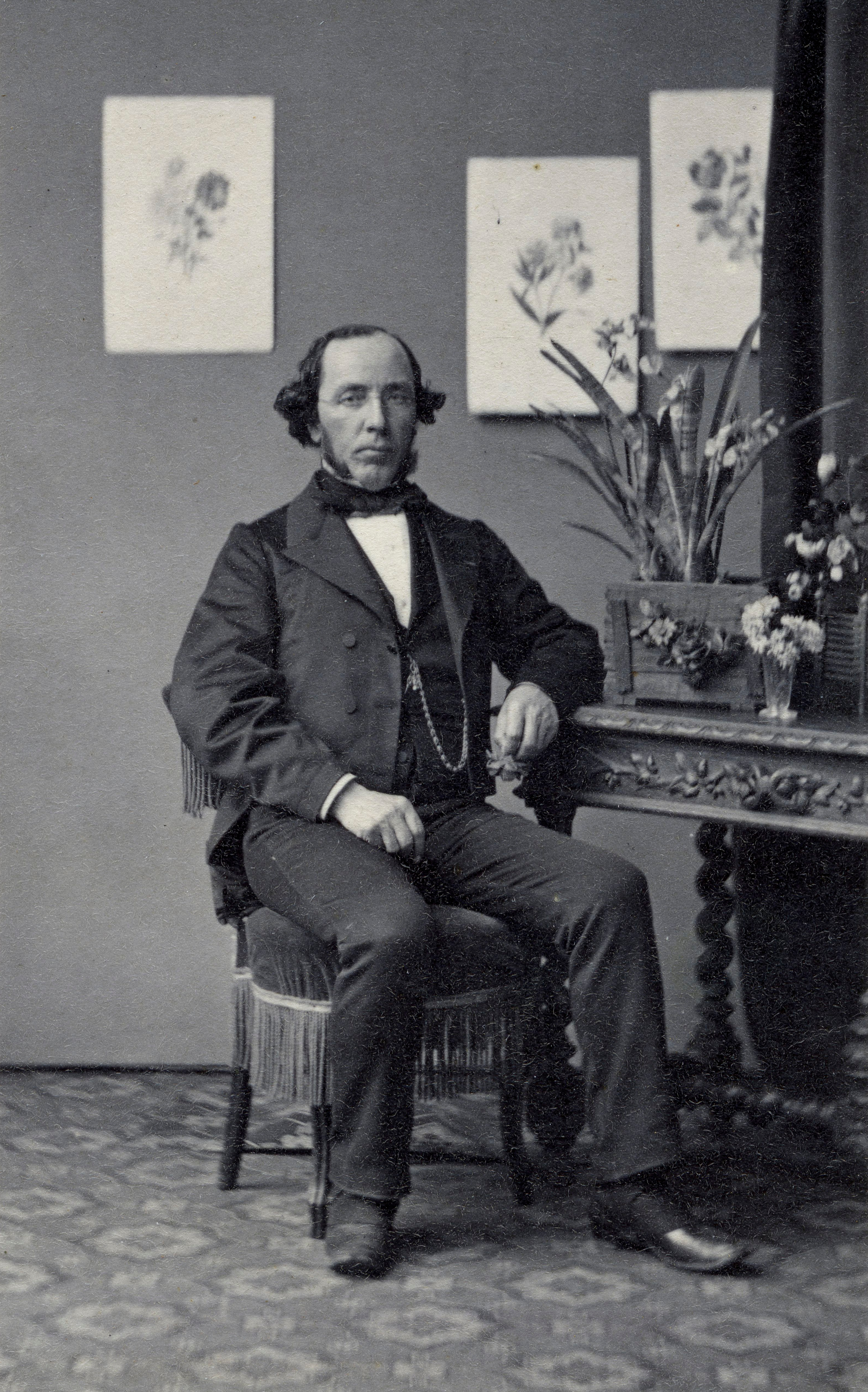
Gaspard Adolphe Chatin (1813–1901), c. 1870

Gaspard Adolphe Chatin (30 November 1813 – 13 January 1901) was a French physician, mycologist and medical botanist who was born in Tullins Isère, and died in Les Essarts-le-Roi. He was the first to prove that goiter was related to iodine deficiency.

Chatin was born in the mountain region of Isère where goiter was common. He apprenticed at the age of 17 to a pharmacist who recognized his talent and sent him to Paris. In Paris, the pharmacist Briant was struck by his intelligence and encouraged him to study. He studied at the Faculté de Médecine in Paris and received his doctorate in May 1840. In 1841, he became Chief Pharmacist at the Beaujon Hospital in Paris, and in 1859 at the Hôtel-Dieu de Paris. He taught botany at the Ecole Superieure de Pharmacie, which he directed from 1874. In April 1886, there were student riots at the school, and his dismissal was demanded. He retired in August 1886 with the title of honorary director.

He was a member of the Académie Nationale de Médecine (1853) and the Académie des Sciences (1874). He was a member of the Société Botanique de France, which he led in 1862, 1878, 1886 and 1896. In 1878, he became an Officer of the Legion d'honneur.

He was the father of the botanist and zoologist Joannes Charles Melchior Chatin (1847–1912).

== Other sources ==
- Guignard, Léon (February 1901). "Notice sur M. Adolphe Chatin". Journal de Pharmacie et de Chimie. 13: 151–60.
- Podolsky, M. Lawrence (1997). Cures Out of Chaos: How Unexpected Discoveries Led to Breakthroughs in Medicine and Health. Harwood Academic Publishers. p. 50. ISBN 978-90-5702-556-3.
- Loriaux, Lynn (2016). A Biographical History of Endocrinology. John Wiley & Sons. ISBN 978-1-119-20246-2.
