= Joannes Charles Melchior Chatin =

French botanist and zoologist (1847–1912)

Joannes Charles Melchior Chatin (19 August 1847 – 4 July 1912) was a French botanist and zoologist.

== Biography ==
Joannes Charles Melchior Chatin was born in Paris, the son of the doctor and botanist Gaspard Adolphe Chatin (1813-1901). During the Franco-Prussian War of 1870, he was an aide-major in the French army. He gained the title doctor of medicine in 1871 and doctor of natural sciences in 1872. In the same year he became professeur agrégé at the École supérieure of pharmacy directed by his father. Then he was a demonstrator at École pratique des hautes études and a lecturer to the Faculty of Science of the University of Paris. On January 4, 1887, he was made assistant professor at that university, then in 1899, full professor.

He was a member of l’Académie Nationale de Médecine (25 May 1886) and l’Académie des sciences (1900). Also he was an officer of the Légion d'honneur.

He died in Les Essarts-le-Roi (Seine-et-Oise) in 1912.

== Partial list of publications ==
- Études botaniques, chimiques et médicales sur le Valérianées, (dissertation) 1872 - Botanical, chemical and medical studies on Valerianaceae.
- Études sur le développement de l'ovule et de la graine, dans les Scrofularinées, les Solanacées, les Borraginées et les Labiées, 1872 - Studies on the development of the ovule and seed in Scrophulariaceae, Solanaceae, Boraginaceae and Labiatae.
- De la Localisation des principes oléo-résineux dans les Valérianées, in: Comptes rendus des séances et mémoires de la Société de biologie, Bd. 4, 1872 - Localization of oleo-resinous principles in Valerianaceae.
- Thèses présentées à la Faculté des sciences de Paris pour obtenir le grade de Docteur ès sciences naturelles, 1873 - Thesis presented to the Faculty of Paris for the degree of doctor of natural sciences.
- Recherches pour servir à l'histoire botanique, chimique et physiologique du Tanguin de Madagascar, 1873 - Research involving the botanical, chemical and physiological history of the faux manguier of Madagascar.
- De la Feuille, 1874
- Du Siège des substances actives dans les plantes médicinales, 1876 - treatise on active substances in medicinal plants.
- Sur la structure et les rapports de la choroïde et de la rétine chez les mollusques du genre Pecten, in: Bulletin de la Société philomathique de Paris, Bd. 2, 1878 - On the structure and relationship involving the choroid and retina in molluscs of the genus Pecten.
- Les Organes de sens dans la série animale, 1880
- Contributions expérimentales à l'étude de la chromatopsie chez les batraciens, les crustacés et les insectes, 1881 - Experimental contributions to the study of color vision in amphibians, crustaceans and insects.
- La Trichine et la trichinose, 1883 - Trichina and trichinosis.
- Sur un Nématode parasite de l'oignon vulgaire, in: Extraits des Comptes rendus des séances de l'Académie des sciences de Paris, 97, 1883 - On a nematode parasite of the common onion.
- Morphologie comparée des pièces maxillaires, mandibulaires et labiales chez les insectes broyeurs, 1884
- Nouvelles recherches sur la ladrerie du mouton, in: Bulletin de l'Académie de médecine, 2. Folge, Bd, 16, 1886
- La Cellule nerveuse, 1890 - The nerve cell.
- La Cellule animale. Sa structure et sa vie, 1892
- Le mâchoire des insectes. Détermination de la pièce directrice, 1897 (Digitalisat)
- Les organes de relation chez les vertébrés, in: Liauté (Hrsg) : Encyclopédie scientifique des aide-mémoire.

== Sources ==
- Traduction de l'article de langue allemande de Wikipedia (version du 26 juin 2007).

translated again.
