= Henri Chatin-Hofmann =

American dancer

Henri Châtin Hofmann (May 25, 1900 – January 7, 1961) was an American dancer; in 1925 he married Anita Berber and started performing with her in Europe. In the 1940s he was considered "the greatest of modern dancers".

== Biography ==
Heinrich Victor Agricola Hofmann was born on May 25, 1900, in Baltimore, 1732 North Calvert Street, one of four children and the only son of the German-American pastor of the Zion Lutheran Church Julius K. Hofmann (1865–1928) and his wife Adele Châtin (d. 1955). At his confirmation in 1915, he insisted on changing his first name and adopted the maiden name of his mother as middle name.

He attended the Calvert School and St. John's College and gave his first recitals in the Vagabond Players Theater.

In the 1920s he moved to Berlin. Here he became the third husband of the dancer Anita Berber in 1924. In Berlin, they caused a stir with a completely naked dance inserted in a film screening of Dante's Divine Comedy. The couple undertook several tours, tours that were overshadowed by the scandals accompanying them. Berber collapsed in Damascus in 1928 and died four months later in Berlin.

Klaus Mann sensitively describes the couple in his obituary of Anita Berber in the magazine Die Bühne (1930).

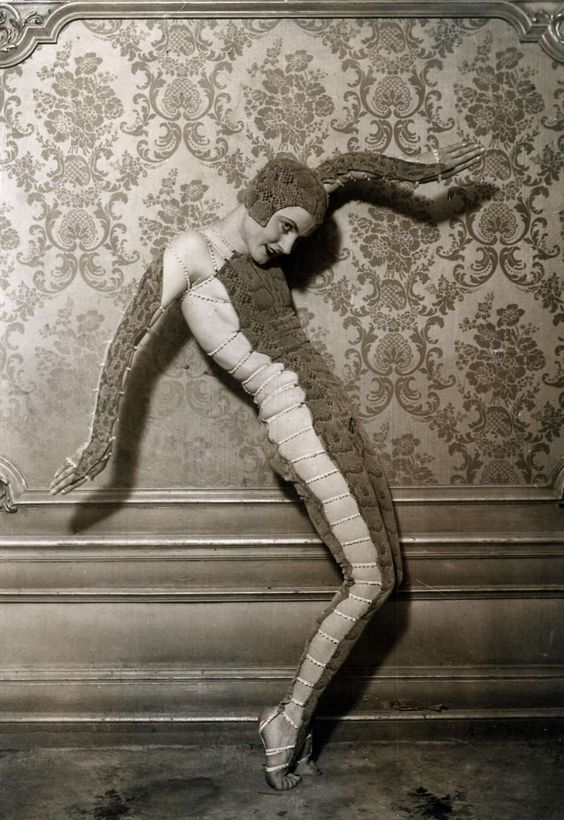
Helena Shelda in the Snake Charmer Dance

In 1930s he married Helena Shelda. The two performed together in the Tanz der Schlangenbeschwörer (Snake Charmer Dance). In 1941, Chatin-Hofmann returned to the United States with his second wife, and tried his own career as a creative dancer.

He spent many years as a patient in Spring Grove, a state hospital at Baltimore, where he died on January 7, 1961. He is buried at Western Cemetery in Baltimore.
