= Gaißach =

- Municipality
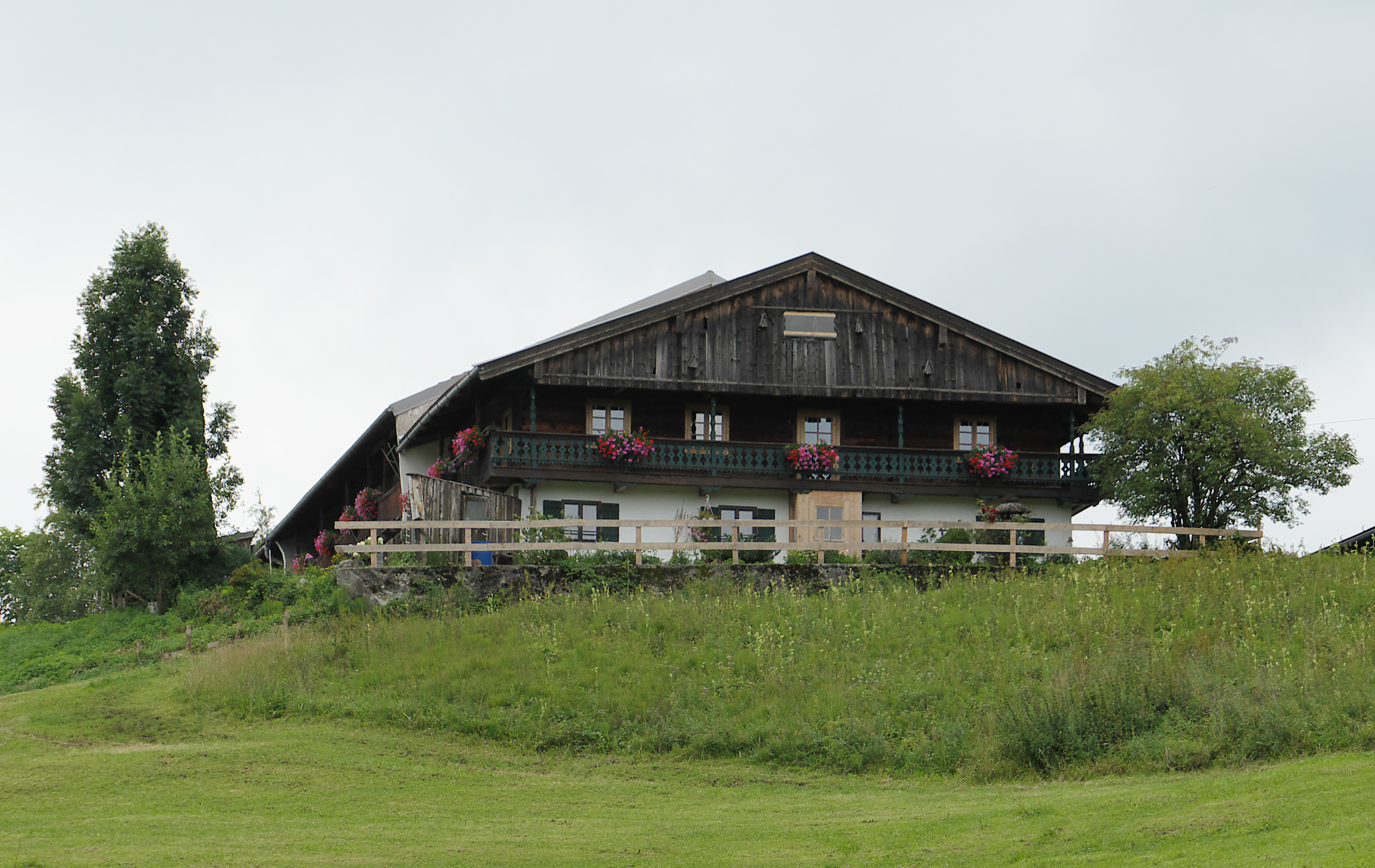
- Traditional farmhouse in Gaissach

- Coat of arms

- Location of Gaißach within Bad Tölz-Wolfratshausen district
- Interactive map of Gaißach
- Location within Germany Location within Bavaria
- Coordinates: 47°45′N 11°35′E
- Country: Germany
- State: Bavaria
- Admin. region: Oberbayern
- District: Bad Tölz-Wolfratshausen

Government
  - Mayor (2020–26): Stefan Fadinger (Ind.)

Area
  - Total: 38.55 km^{2} (14.88 sq mi)
- Elevation: 735 m (2,411 ft)

Population (2025-12-31)
  - Total: 3,228
  - Density: 83.74/km^{2} (216.9/sq mi)
- Time zone: UTC+01:00 (CET)
  - Summer (DST): UTC+02:00 (CEST)
- Postal codes: 83674
- Dialling codes: 08041 und 08042
- Vehicle registration: TÖL
- Website: www.gaissach.de

Gaißach is a municipality in the district of Bad Tölz-Wolfratshausen in Bavaria in Germany.
