= Kurt Strauss =

German-born British electrical engineer (1930–2026)

- Born: 11 July 1930; Stuttgart, Württemberg, Germany
- Died: 2 March 2026 (aged 95)
- Occupation: Electrical engineer
- Spouse: Ann Strauss (m. 1956; died. 2013)

Kurt Strauss (11 July 1930 – 2 March 2026) was a German-born British electrical engineer. A Quaker, he was best known for his engineering work for the Electricity Council and Eurovision. After the assassination of John F. Kennedy, he gained significant national attention after sharing dramatic film images of the assassination to numerous news television channels across Europe.

Strauss was born in Stuttgart on 11 July 1930, the son of Marianne and Victor Strauss. His parents were Jewish. With help of the Quakers' Germany Emergency Committee, he and his family escaped Germany, and emigrated to England as refugees. At the age of 18, he left school and joined EMI, attempting to earn his degree in radio engineering, but was interrupted by serving two years with the Royal Electrical and Mechanical Engineers. He worked as a senior engineer for the Electricity Council until 1989.

Strauss died on 2 March 2026, at the age of 95.
