= Fred Sauer =

Austrian actor, film director and screenwriter

- Born: 14 December 1886; Graz, Austria-Hungary (now Austria)
- Died: 17 September 1952 (aged 65); Berlin, Germany
- Occupation(s): Actor, film director, screenwriter

Fred Sauer (14 December 1886 – 17 September 1952) was an Austrian actor, film director and screenwriter.

== Filmography ==
=== As director ===
- 1920: The Apache Chief (Der Apachenlord)
- 1920: The Law of the Desert
- 1920: Demon Blood
- 1921: Monte Carlo
- 1922: Youth
- 1922: The Shadows of That Night
- 1922: The Men of Frau Clarissa
- 1923: Time Is Money
- 1923: The Comedian's Child (Das Komödiantenkind)
- 1924: Heart of Stone (Das kalte Herz)
- 1925: Frisian Blood
- 1925: The Company Worth Millions
- 1925: The Ascent of Little Lilian (Aufstieg der kleinen Lilian)
- 1926: German Hearts on the German Rhine (Deutsche Herzen am deutschen Rhein)
- 1926: Professor Imhof (Wenn das Herz der Jugend spricht)
- 1927: The Woman Who Couldn't Say No (Die Frau, die nicht "Nein" sagen kann)
- 1927: The Awakening of Woman (Das Erwachen des Weibes)
- 1928: Single Mother (Ledige Mütter)
- 1928: In Werder the Trees are in Bloom (In Werder blühen die Bäume ...)
- 1929: Sweet Pepper (Lockendes Gift)
- 1929: The Secret Adversary (Die Abenteurer G.m.b.H.)
- 1929: Miss Midshipman (Fräulein Fähnrich)
- 1929: Furnished Room (Möblierte Zimmer)
- 1930: Dangers of the Engagement Period
- 1930: Helene Willfüer, Student of Chemistry
- 1931: The Stranger (Die Fremde)
- 1932: The Pride of Company Three (Der Stolz der 3. Kompanie)
- 1934: Hen Pecked Husbands (Der Meisterboxer)
- 1934: The Two Seals (Die beiden Seehunde)
- 1935: All Because of the Dog (Alles weg’n dem Hund)
- 1937: Gordian the Tyrant
- 1937: The Laugh Doctor (Der Lachdoktor)

=== As writer ===
- 1923: The Comedian's Child (Das Komödiantenkind)
- 1925: Tragedy
- 1926: The Woman in Gold (Die Frau in Gold)
- 1927: The Awakening of Woman (Das Erwachen des Weibes)
- 1928: Love and Thieves (Liebe und Diebe)
- 1928: Single Mother (Ledige Mütter)
- 1929: Sweet Pepper (Lockendes Gift)
- 1937: The Laugh Doctor (Der Lachdoktor)
