= Walter Wassermann =

German screenwriter, director, and actor (1883 - 1944)

- Born: 19 September 1883; Berlin, German Empire
- Died: 4 October 1944 (aged 61); Salzburg, Nazi Germany
- Occupations: Screenwriter, director, and actor
- Years active: 1912–1944 (film)
- Spouse: Lotte Neumann (m.1935)

Walter Wassermann (19 September 1883 – 4 October 1944) was a German screenwriter, director, and actor. He directed one film and acted in seven during the silent era.

== Selected filmography ==
- The Hotel of the Dead (1921)
- Deceiver of the People (1921)
- The Men of Frau Clarissa (1922)
- The Shadows of That Night (1922)
- The Queen of Whitechapel (1922)
- The Woman from the Orient (1923)
- Time Is Money (1923)
- The Comedian's Child (1923)
- Heart of Stone (1924)
- Destiny (1925)
- Tragedy (1925)
- The Woman in Gold (1926)
- The Good Reputation (1926)
- The Awakening of Woman (1927)
- The Impostor (1927)
- It Attracted Three Fellows (1928)
- He Goes Right, She Goes Left! (1928)
- The Girl with the Whip (1929)
- Secret Police (1929)
- The Caviar Princess (1930)
- Of Life and Death (1930)
- A Thousand Words of German (1930)
- The Blonde Nightingale (1930)
- Pension Schöller (1930)
- Twice Married (1930)
- Next, Please! (1930)
- Dangers of the Engagement Period (1930)
- The Rhineland Girl (1930)
- Ash Wednesday (1931)
- Storm in a Water Glass (1931)
- Such a Greyhound (1931)
- The Stranger (1931)
- The True Jacob (1931)
- The Unfaithful Eckehart (1931)
- Wibbel the Tailor (1931)
- The Escape to Nice (1932)
- A Night in Paradise (1932)
- The Testament of Cornelius Gulden (1932)
- Happy Days in Aranjuez (1933)
- Tell Me Who You Are (1933)
- The Big Bluff (1933)
- The Sandwich Girl (1933)
- Goodbye, Beautiful Days (1933)
- The Page from the Dalmasse Hotel (1933)
- The Voice of Love (1934)
- Police Report (1934)
- A Girl Whirls By the World (1934)
- Hearts are Trumps (1934)
- The Daring Swimmer (1934)
- Pygmalion (1935)
- She and the Three (1935)
- The Beggar Student (1936)
- Men Without a Fatherland (1937)
- Sergeant Berry (1938)
- Mystery About Beate (1938)
- Robert Koch (1939)
- Friedrich Schiller (1940)
- Kora Terry (1940)
- The Night in Venice (1942)
- An Old Heart Becomes Young Again (1943)

== Bibliography ==
- Prawer, S.S. Between Two Worlds: The Jewish Presence in German and Austrian Film, 1910-1933. Berghahn Books, 2005.
