= Algol (1920 film) =

1920 film

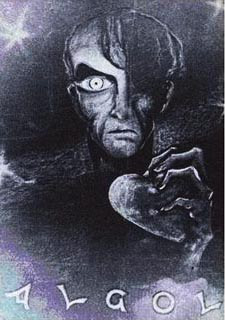
- Original poster
- Directed by: Hans Werckmeister
- Written by: Hans Brennert; Fridel Köhne
- Produced by: Deutsche Lichtbild-Gesellschaft
- Starring: Emil Jannings; John Gottowt; Käthe Haack; Hanna Ralph
- Cinematography: Axel Graatkjaer; Hermann Kircheldorff
- Distributed by: Universum Film AG (UFA)
- Release date: 3 September 1920
- Running time: 81 minutes
- Country: Weimar Republic
- Languages: Silent film; German intertitles

Algol: Tragedy of Power (1920) by Hans Werckmeister

Algol: Tragedy of Power (German: Algol. Tragödie der Macht) is a 1920 German science fiction film about an alien from the star Algol.

== Plot ==
A still from Algol showing the futuristic scenography created by Walter Reimann

The story follows the life of Robert Herne, who works in a coal mine, and his friendship with Maria Obal. While working in the mine, he encounters an inhabitant of a planet of the star Algol who gives him a prototype machine which can provide a virtually unlimited source of power. Over the next year, Herne sets up a factory providing energy; however, instead of simply relieving workers of the difficult job of mining, the device creates massive economic upheaval throughout the world.

Over the next 20 years, Herne continues to increase his power and influence, but he has lost touch with Maria who now lives in the one part of the world to which his influence does not extend. The film follows the machinations of Herne's son Reginald and his – ultimately unsuccessful – attempt at a coup, aiming to seize the secrets of the machine for himself. Meanwhile, Maria has had a son who travels to meet Herne to ask for his assistance: his country's coal reserves have expired. Herne initially refuses assistance; Maria visits him to ask in person. He comes to realise the extent to which he has been corrupted by power. In a moment of realisation, Herne destroys the machine, thereby preventing his son from taking control after his death.

== Cast ==
- Emil Jannings as Robert Herne, the protagonist. The film follows his life from that of a normal man to that of corrupt dictator over a period of 20 years.
- John Gottowt as Algol, an extraterrestrial, presumably from the planet orbiting Algol star, who gives Robert Herne a machine that produces unlimited energy. Algol's motivations are not made clear.
- Hans Adalbert Schlettow as Peter Hell, the son of Herne's friend Maria. He lives in the one part of the world over which Herne has no influence. He travels to seek from Herne aid for his country, but Herne denies his request. He returns to his homeland with Herne's daughter Magda.
- Hanna Ralph as Maria Obal, mother of Peter Hell and a former friend of Herne, from before his encounter with Algol. Her influence causes Herne realise what he has become.
- Erna Morena as Yella Ward.
- Ernst Hofmann as Reginald Herne, Robert Herne's son and chosen successor. Despite his father's promises to one day show him the secrets of the machine, he hungers for power and seeks to overthrow his father by means of a coup.
- Gertrude Welcker as Leonore Nissen.
- Käthe Haack as Magda Herne, Robert Herne's daughter. Following her father's refusal to provide aid, she realises the extent of his corruption and leaves with Peter.
- Sebastian Droste as a dancer.

== Production background ==
The film was directed by Hans Werckmeister and stars Emil Jannings and John Gottowt. The sets for the movie were constructed by Walter Reimann, one of the set designers of The Cabinet of Dr. Caligari (released February 1920).

The film was produced by the Deutsche Lichtbild-Gesellschaft (German Light Play Company) in Berlin and was distributed by Universum Film AG (UFA). Its first release was on 3 September 1920 in Berlin, and was subsequently released worldwide including a launch in Finland on 7 November 1921.

== Reviews ==
Contemporary critics particularly praised Reimann's set design and Graatkjaer's cinematography. However, they found the film to be a strange mixture of realism and fantasy; the fantastical elements were considered material and not arising from the film's unreality. This was attributed to the seemingly random sequence of scenes, which was seen as a result of poor direction. The story suffered from a lack of logic but had some poetically interesting moments.

== Preservation status ==
For many years, it was believed that this was a lost film, but an intact version was recovered. It was screened by The Museum of Modern Art on November 29, 2010, as part of their film exhibition Weimar Cinema, 1919–1933: Daydreams and Nightmares.

== See also ==
- List of rediscovered films
- 1920 in science fiction
