= Hans Werckmeister =

- Born: 27 December 1871
- Died: 4 July 1929 (aged 57)

Hans Werckmeister (27 December 1871 – 4 July 1929) was a German film director. He is best known for his film Algol.

== Life ==
Hans Werckmeister likely made his acting debut in Berlin in 1900, where he performed on several stages. Around 1910, he worked as a director at the Neues Theater, which at that time was primarily known as an entertainment and operetta theater. In the 1911/12 season, he became chief director at the Künstlertheater and continued in this capacity in Cologne from 1914 onward.

In 1918, Werckmeister switched to film. He worked for Deulig and was ultimately production manager for the magazine Epoche . The films he made between 1918 and 1927 featured such well-known actors as Emil Jannings, Cläre Lotto, Carl de Vogt, and Lotte Neumann.

By amending the articles of association on 17 March 1922, Alba Allgemeine Baugesellschaft Berlin-Tempelhof mbH was transformed into Presto-Film GmbH (1922–1927), with Hans Werckmeister becoming managing director.

Hans Werckmeister is still known today for his silent film and early science fiction work Algol. Tragedy of Power (1920). His wife was the actress Luise Werckmeister, and his daughter was the actress and singer Vicky Werckmeister.

== Filmography ==
- Algol (film) (1920)
- The Golden Net (1922)
- The Affair of Baroness Orlovska (1923)
- The Brigantine of New York (1924)
