= List of German films of 1932 =

A list of films released in Germany in 1932, the last full year of the Weimar Republic.

== A–L ==
Title	Director	Cast	Genre	Notes
Adventures in the Engadin	Max Obal	Walter Riml, Guzzi Lantschner, Harald Reinl	Sports comedy	
All Is at Stake	Max Nosseck	Eddie Polo, Luciano Albertini, Claire Rommer	Comedy thriller	
Annemarie, the Bride of the Company	Carl Boese	Lucie Englisch, Paul Heidemann, Albert Paulig	Comedy	
An Auto and No Money	Jacob Fleck, Luise Fleck	Paul Kemp, Dina Gralla, Igo Sym	Comedy	
At Your Orders, Sergeant	Erich Schönfelder	Ralph Arthur Roberts, Ida Wüst, Margot Walter	Comedy	
The Bartered Bride	Max Ophüls	Jarmila Novotna, Otto Wernicke, Karl Valentin	Comedy	
The Beautiful Adventure	Reinhold Schünzel	Käthe von Nagy, Wolf Albach-Retty, Alfred Abel	Comedy	
A Bit of Love	Max Neufeld	Lee Parry, Magda Schneider, Hermann Thimig	Comedy	
The Black Hussar	Gerhard Lamprecht	Conrad Veidt, Mady Christians, Wolf Albach-Retty	Historical comedy	
A Blonde Dream	Paul Martin	Lilian Harvey, Willy Fritsch, Willi Forst	Musical comedy	
The Blue Light	Leni Riefenstahl	Leni Riefenstahl, Mathias Wieman, Beni Führer	Drama	
The Blue of Heaven	Victor Janson	Mártha Eggerth, Hermann Thimig, Fritz Kampers	Musical	
Cavaliers of the Kurfürstendamm	Romano Mengon	Olaf Fjord, Friedl Haerlin, Harry Frank	Comedy	
The Champion Shot	Franz Seitz	Weiß Ferdl, Max Adalbert, Hugo Schrader	Comedy	
Chauffeur Antoinette	Herbert Selpin	Charlotte Ander, Hans Adalbert Schlettow, Walter Steinbeck	Comedy	
The Cheeky Devil	Carl Boese, Heinz Hille	Willy Fritsch, Camilla Horn, Ralph Arthur Roberts	Comedy	
The Company's in Love	Max Ophüls	Gustav Fröhlich, Anny Ahlers, Lien Deyers	Comedy	
Contest	Erich Schönfelder	Manfred von Brauchitsch, Evelyn Holt, Kurt Vespermann	Sports	
Countess Mariza	Richard Oswald	Dorothea Wieck, Hubert Marischka, Charlotte Ander	Musical	
The Countess of Monte Cristo	Karl Hartl	Brigitte Helm, Rudolf Forster, Gustaf Gründgens	Comedy	
Crime Reporter Holm	Erich Engels	Hermann Speelmans, Elga Brink, Julius Falkenstein	Mystery	
The Cruel Mistress	Carl Lamac	Anny Ondra, Fritz Rasp, Lina Woiwode	Comedy	Co-production with Austria
Cruiser Emden	Louis Ralph	Renée Stobrawa, Werner Fuetterer, Louis Ralph	War	
The Dancer of Sanssouci	Frederic Zelnik	Otto Gebühr, Lil Dagover, Rosa Valetti	Historical	
Death Over Shanghai	Rolf Randolf	Gerda Maurus, Else Elster, Theodor Loos	Thriller	
Distorting at the Resort	Victor Janson	Maria Matray, Paul Hörbiger, Otto Wallburg	Comedy	
Eight Girls in a Boat	Erich Waschneck	Karin Hardt, Theodor Loos, Martha Ziegler	Drama	
The Eleven Schill Officers	Rudolf Meinert	Friedrich Kayßler, Hertha Thiele, Heinz Klingenberg	Historical	
The Escape to Nice	James Bauer	Georg Alexander, Else Elster, Gerhard Dammann	Comedy	
F.P.1 Doesn't Respond	Karl Hartl	Hans Albers, Sybille Schmitz, Paul Hartmann	Adventure	
The First Right of the Child	Fritz Wendhausen	Hertha Thiele, Erna Morena, Hermann Vallentin	Drama	
For Once I'd Like to Have No Troubles	Rudolf Walther-Fein	Max Hansen, Ursula Grabley, Fritz Grünbaum	Comedy	
The Four from Bob 13	Johannes Guter	Gretl Theimer, Werner Fuetterer, Peter Voß	Comedy	
The Five Accursed Gentlemen	Julien Duvivier	Anton Walbrook, Camilla Horn, Jack Trevor	Mystery	Produced in France
Five from the Jazz Band	Erich Engel	Jenny Jugo, Rolf von Goth, Karel Stepanek	Musical	
Frederica	Fritz Friedmann-Frederich	Mady Christians, Veit Harlan, Eduard von Winterstein	Historical	
Gitta Discovers Her Heart	Carl Froelich	Gustav Fröhlich, Gitta Alpar, Paul Kemp	Musical	
The Golden Anchor	Alexander Korda	Albert Bassermann, Ursula Grabley, Mathias Wieman	Drama	Co-production with France
Grandstand for General Staff	Eugen Thiele	Iván Petrovich, Elga Brink, Betty Bird	Comedy	
Gypsies of the Night	Hanns Schwarz	Jenny Jugo, Hans Brausewetter, Paul Kemp	Comedy	
Happy Ever After	Paul Martin, Robert Stevenson	Lilian Harvey, Jack Hulbert, Sonnie Hale	Musical	Co-production with UK
Haunted People	Friedrich Feher	Magda Sonja, Eugen Klöpfer, Hans Feher	Drama	Co-production with Czechoslovakia
The Heath Is Green	Hans Behrendt	Camilla Spira, Theodor Loos, Fritz Kampers	Comedy	
Here's Berlin	Julien Duvivier	Josette Day, Germaine Aussey, Wolfgang Klein	Comedy	French-German co-production
Holzapfel Knows Everything	Victor Janson	Felix Bressart, Gretl Theimer, Iván Petrovich	Comedy	
How Shall I Tell My Husband?	Reinhold Schünzel	Renate Müller, Georg Alexander, Otto Wallburg	Comedy	
I by Day, You by Night	Ludwig Berger	Käthe von Nagy, Willy Fritsch, Julius Falkenstein	Comedy	
I Do Not Want to Know Who You Are	Géza von Bolváry	Liane Haid, Gustav Fröhlich, S.Z. Sakall	Comedy	
The Importance of Being Earnest	Franz Wenzler	Charlotte Ander, Georg Alexander, Harald Paulsen	Comedy	
The Invisible Front	Richard Eichberg	Trude von Molo, Karl Ludwig Diehl, Theodor Loos	War thriller	
Johnny Steals Europe	Harry Piel, Andrew Marton	Harry Piel, Dary Holm, Alfred Abel	Comedy crime	
Kiki	Carl Lamac	Anny Ondra, Hermann Thimig, Paul Otto	Comedy	
Kuhle Wampe	Slatan Dudow	Hertha Thiele, Ernst Busch, Adolf Fischer	Drama	
The Ladies Diplomat	E. W. Emo	Mártha Eggerth, Max Hansen, Leo Slezak	Comedy	
Love at First Sight	Carl Froelich	Lee Parry, Lizzi Waldmüller, Adele Sandrock	Comedy	

== M–Z ==
Title	Director	Cast	Genre	Notes
A Mad Idea	Kurt Gerron	Willy Fritsch, Dorothea Wieck, Rosy Barsony	Comedy	
The Mad Bomberg	Georg Asagaroff	Hans Adalbert Schlettow, Liselotte Schaak, Paul Heidemann	Comedy	
Madame Makes Her Exit	Wilhelm Thiele	Liane Haid, Hans Brausewetter, Hilde Hildebrand	Comedy	
The Magic Top Hat	Rudolf Bernauer	Charlotte Ander, Felix Bressart, Oskar Sima	Comedy	
A Man with Heart	Géza von Bolváry	Gustav Fröhlich, Maria Matray, Gustav Waldau	Comedy	
Man Without a Name	Gustav Ucicky	Werner Krauss, Helene Thimig, Mathias Wieman	Drama	
Marshal Forwards	Heinz Paul	Paul Wegener, Traute Carlsen, Elga Brink	Historical	
Melody of Love	Georg Jacoby	Richard Tauber, Petra Unkel, Lien Deyers	Musical	
The Mistress of Atlantis	Georg Wilhelm Pabst	Brigitte Helm, Gustav Diessl, Heinz Klingenberg	Adventure	Co-production with France
Modern Dowry	E. W. Emo	Mártha Eggerth, Georg Alexander, Trude Berliner	Comedy	
Mrs. Lehmann's Daughters	Carl Heinz Wolff	Hansi Niese, Hertha Thiele, Else Elster	Comedy	
My Friend the Millionaire	Hans Behrendt	Hermann Thimig, Liselotte Schaak, Olga Limburg	Comedy	
Narcotics	Kurt Gerron, Roger Le Bon	Jean Murat, Danièle Parola, Jean Mercanton	Crime	French-language version of The White Demon
Night Convoy	James Bauer	Olga Chekhova, Oskar Homolka, Vladimir Gajdarov	Drama	
A Night in Paradise	Carl Lamac	Anny Ondra, Hermann Thimig, Ralph Arthur Roberts	Musical	
Night of Temptation	Léo Lasko, Robert Wohlmuth	Werner Fuetterer, Elga Brink, Josef Eichheim	Drama	
No Money Needed	Carl Boese	Hedy Lamarr, Heinz Rühmann, Hans Moser	Comedy	
Once There Was a Waltz	Victor Janson	Mártha Eggerth, Rolf von Goth, Paul Hörbiger	Musical	
Overnight Sensation	Max Neufeld	Magda Schneider, Hermann Thimig, S.Z. Sakall	Comedy	
Paprika	Carl Boese	Franciska Gaal, Paul Hörbiger, Paul Heidemann	Comedy	
Peter Voss, Thief of Millions	Ewald André Dupont	Willi Forst, Alice Treff, Paul Hörbiger	Comedy	
The Pride of Company Three	Fred Sauer	Heinz Rühmann, Anton Walbrook, Eugen Burg	Comedy	
The Prince of Arcadia	Karl Hartl	Willi Forst, Liane Haid, Albert Paulig	Romance	Co-production with Austria
Raid in St. Pauli	Werner Hochbaum	Gina Falckenberg, Friedrich Gnaß, Wolfgang Zilzer	Drama	
Rasputin, Demon with Women	Adolf Trotz	Conrad Veidt, Brigitte Horney, Hermine Sterler	Drama	
The Rebel	Curtis Bernhardt, Edwin H. Knopf, Luis Trenker	Luis Trenker, Luise Ullrich, Victor Varconi	Historical	
The Ringer	Martin Frič, Karel Lamač	Paul Richter, Maria Matray, Wera Engels	Mystery	Co-production with Austria
Quick	Robert Siodmak	Lilian Harvey, Hans Albers, Paul Hörbiger	Comedy	
Sacred Waters	Erich Waschneck	Karin Hardt, Eduard von Winterstein, Carl Balhaus	Drama	
Scampolo	Hans Steinhoff	Dolly Haas, Karl Ludwig Diehl, Paul Hörbiger	Comedy	
Scandal on Park Street	Franz Wenzler	Camilla Spira, Fritz Kampers, Dorothea Thiess	Comedy	
Secret Agent	Harry Piel	Harry Piel, Maria Matray, Eduard von Winterstein	Thriller	
The Secret of Johann Orth	Willi Wolff	Karl Ludwig Diehl, Ellen Richter, Paul Wegener	Historical	
Secret of the Blue Room	Erich Engels	Theodor Loos, Else Elster, Hans Adalbert Schlettow	Mystery	
Ship Without a Harbour	Harry Piel	Harry Piel, Trude Berliner, Eugen Rex	Thriller	
A Shot at Dawn	Alfred Zeisler	Ery Bos, Genia Nikolaieva, Peter Lorre	Crime	
The Song of Night	Anatole Litvak	Jan Kiepura, Magda Schneider, Otto Wallburg	Musical	
Spell of the Looking Glass	Frank Wisbar	Franz Weber, Ursula Grabley, Oskar Karlweis	Comedy	
Spies at the Savoy Hotel	Frederic Zelnik	Alfred Abel, Olga Tschechowa, Margot Landa	Comedy	
Spoiling the Game	Alfred Zeisler	Heinz Rühmann, Toni van Eyck, Hermann Speelmans	Comedy	
Storms of Passion	Robert Siodmak	Emil Jannings, Anna Sten, Trude Hesterberg	Crime drama	French version Tumultes also produced
The Testament of Cornelius Gulden	E.W. Emo	Magda Schneider, Georg Alexander, Theo Lingen	Comedy	
A Tremendously Rich Man	Hans Steinhoff	Curt Bois, Dolly Haas, Liselotte Schaak	Comedy	
Trenck	Ernst Neubach, Heinz Paul	Hans Stüwe, Dorothea Wieck, Olga Chekhova	Historical adventure	
Tannenberg	Heinz Paul	Hans Stüwe, Käthe Haack, Hertha von Walther	War	
Thea Roland	Henry Koster	Lil Dagover, Hans Rehmann, Margarete Kupfer	Comedy	
Theodor Körner	Carl Boese	Willy Domgraf-Fassbaender, Dorothea Wieck, Lissy Arna	Historical	
Things Are Getting Better Already	Kurt Gerron	Dolly Haas, Heinz Rühmann, Paul Otto	Comedy	
This One or None	Carl Froelich	Gitta Alpar, Max Hansen, Ferdinand von Alten	Musical	
Three from the Unemployment Office	Eugen Thiele	Fritz Kampers, Paul Kemp, Anton Walbrook	Comedy	
The Tsar's Diamond	Max Neufeld	Liane Haid, Iván Petrovich, Viktor de Kowa	Comedy	
Two Hearts Beat as One	Wilhelm Thiele	Lilian Harvey, Wolf Albach-Retty, Kurt Lilien	Musical	
Two Heavenly Blue Eyes	Johannes Meyer	Charlotte Ander, Hermann Thimig, Theo Lingen	Comedy	
Two in a Car	Joe May	Karl Ludwig Diehl, Magda Schneider, Richard Romanowsky	Comedy	
Two Lucky Days	Rudolf Walther-Fein	Jakob Tiedtke, Claire Rommer, Ida Wüst	Comedy	
Under False Flag	Johannes Meyer	Charlotte Susa, Gustav Fröhlich, Friedrich Kayssler	Thriller	
Uncanny Stories	Richard Oswald	Paul Wegener, Harald Paulsen, Roma Bahn	Horror	
Vampire	Carl Theodor Dreyer	Sybille Schmitz, Maurice Schutz, Nicolas de Gunzburg	Horror	Co-production with France
The Victor	Hans Hinrich, Paul Martin	Hans Albers, Käthe von Nagy, Julius Falkenstein	Comedy	
Viennese Waltz	Conrad Wiene	Michael Bohnen, Lee Parry, Paul Hörbiger	Historical	
Woe if He is Let Loose	Karel Lamač	Vlasta Burian, Friedl Haerlin, Harry Frank	Comedy	
When Love Sets the Fashion	Franz Wenzler	Renate Müller, Hubert von Meyerinck, Georg Alexander	Comedy	
Wrong Number, Miss	E. W. Emo	Magda Schneider, Johannes Riemann, Trude Berliner	Comedy	
You Don't Forget Such a Girl	Fritz Kortner	Willi Forst, Dolly Haas, Oskar Sima	Romantic comedy	Co-production with Austria

== Documentaries ==
Title	Director	Cast	Genre	Notes
Erwerbslose kochen für Erwerbslose	Ella Bergmann-Michel		documentary	
Filmtagebuch vom Krieg in China	Martin Rikli		Documentary	
Fischfang in der Rhön (an der Sinn)	Ella Bergmann-Michel		documentary	
Fliegende Händler in Frankfurt am Main	Ella Bergmann-Michel		documentary	
Frauen, Masken und Dämonen	Hans Schomburgk		documentary	
Die Hitlerkundgebung in Hamburg – 20. Juli 1932			propaganda documentary	Available online here
Hitler-Jugend in den Bergen	Stuart Josef Lutz		propaganda documentary	Available online here
Hitler über Deutschland			propaganda documentary	
Im Heiligtum von Ling-Yin	Martin Rikli		Documentary	
Ikarus	Curt Wesse		documentary	
Ein Jungbrunnen im Lande der Mitte. Modernes Leben in der alten Stadt Hang-Tschau-Fu	Martin Rikli		documentary	
Kampf um die Mandschurei	Johannes Häussler		documentary	
Kampf um den Rhein			documentary	
Kirche und Heimat	Gertrud David		documentary	
Natur als Schützerin im Kampf ums Dasein	Wolfram Junghans, Ulrich K.T. Schultz		documentary	
P.S.	Ulrich Kayser		documentary	
Rundfunk einst und jetzt	Johannes Guter		documentary	
Stadt und Land	Hans Ewald sen.		Propaganda	Commissioned by Reichsleitung der N.S.D.A.P., Abt. Film (Berlin)
Die steinernen Wunder von Naumburg	Rudolf Bamberger		documentary	
Verkannte Menschen	Wilhelm Ballier		documentary	
Wahlkampf 1932 (Letzte Wahl)	Ella Bergmann-Michel		documentary	Available online here
Wo wohnen alte Leute	Ella Bergmann-Michel		documentary	

== Short films ==
Title	Director	Cast	Genre	Notes
Barcarole	Ferdinand Diehl, Hermann Diehl		animation	
Flitterwochen	B. Vogler, Georg Woelz		animation	
Koloraturen	Oskar Fischinger		Animation	
Pitsch und Patsch	Rudolf Pfenninger		Animation	
Serenade	Ferdinand Diehl, Hermann Diehl		animation	
Sissi	Lotte Reiniger		Animation	
Sonne ins Haus	Hans Fischerkoesen		Animation	
Studie Nr. 10	Oskar Fischinger		Animation	
Studie Nr. 11	Oskar Fischinger		Animation	
Studie Nr. 12	Oskar Fischinger		Animation	
Tres Caballeros	Julius Pinschewer		Animation	Spanish speaking promotional film for Bayer AG
