= Eva Braun's private films =

1938–1944 works by Adolf Hitler's wife

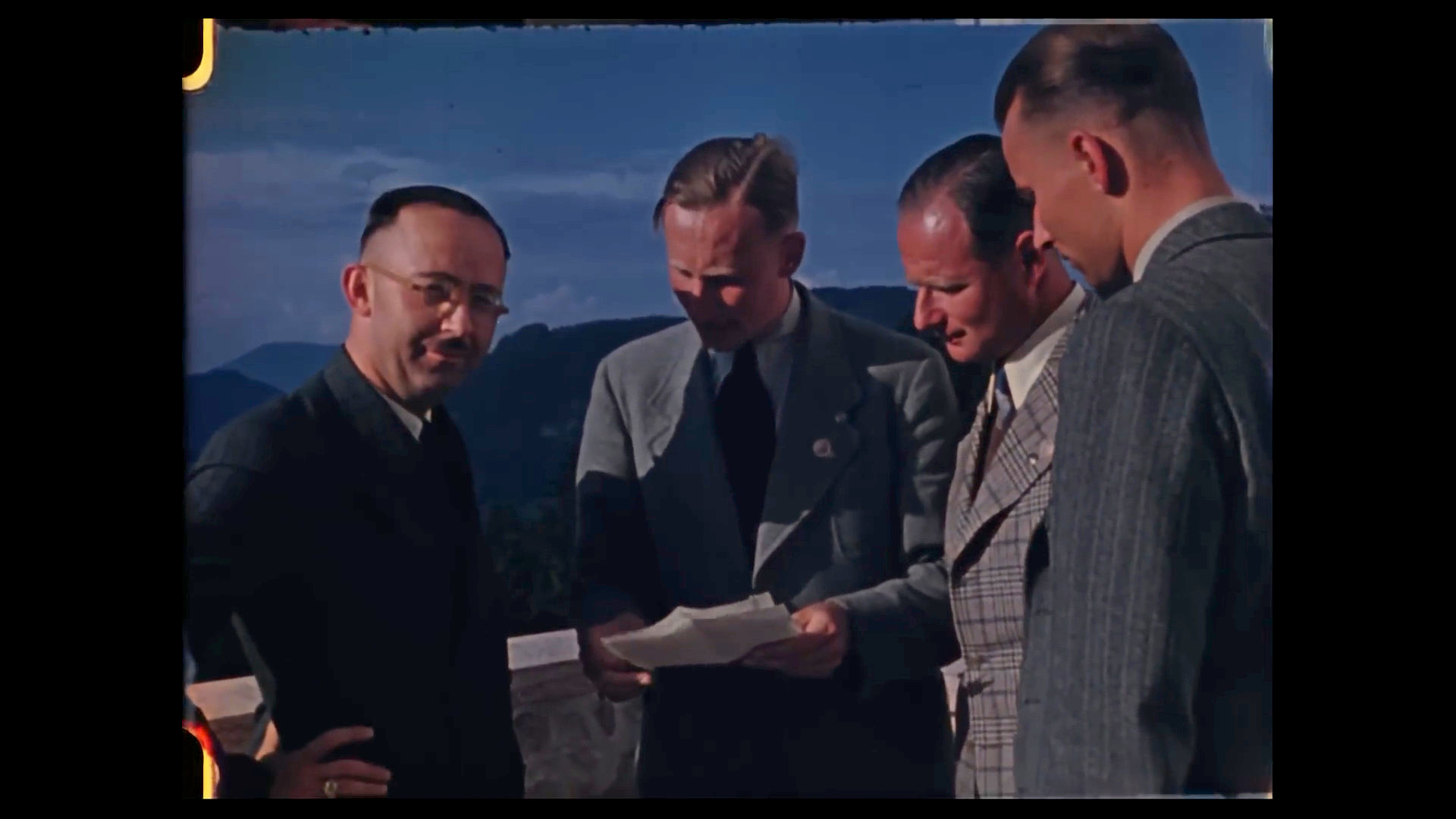
Screenshot from Eva Braun's private films

Eva Braun was an avid and passionate filmmaker and photographer, extensively documenting her surroundings between 1938 and 1944. The resulting footage — now classified by the U.S. National Archives (NARA) as "Private Motion Pictures of Adolf Hitler and Eva Braun" — captures both her personal life and the inner circle of the Nazi regime in southern Germany. Nine surviving reels of 16mm silent color and black and white film, copied from the original 28, depict typical home movie themes: Braun, her family, and friends enjoying leisure activities such as sports, countryside walks, family gatherings, celebrations, travel, and scenes with pets and children at play. However, these seemingly private moments are interwoven with unique behind-the-scenes glimpses of life at the Berghof, Adolf Hitler's residence in Obersalzberg. The footage also features top Nazi officials in informal settings and offers rare visual documentation of key historical moments and meetings.

== Popcultural references ==
The footage has been used in numerous historical documentaries and exhibitions to illustrate the private lives of Nazi leaders and the contrast between personal imagery and political context. It can be considered part of the collective imageries of the Third Reich. The earliest documented uses of Eva Braun's private films are US newsreels from 1947. These initial reproductions set the stage for subsequent incorporations into productions such as Nazisti alla sbarra: Il processo di Norimberga (IT, 1947), Love Life of Adolf Hitler (US, 1948), Autant en emporte l'histoire (FR, 1949), and The Secret Life of Adolf Hitler (War in Europe, S01E10, US, 1951).

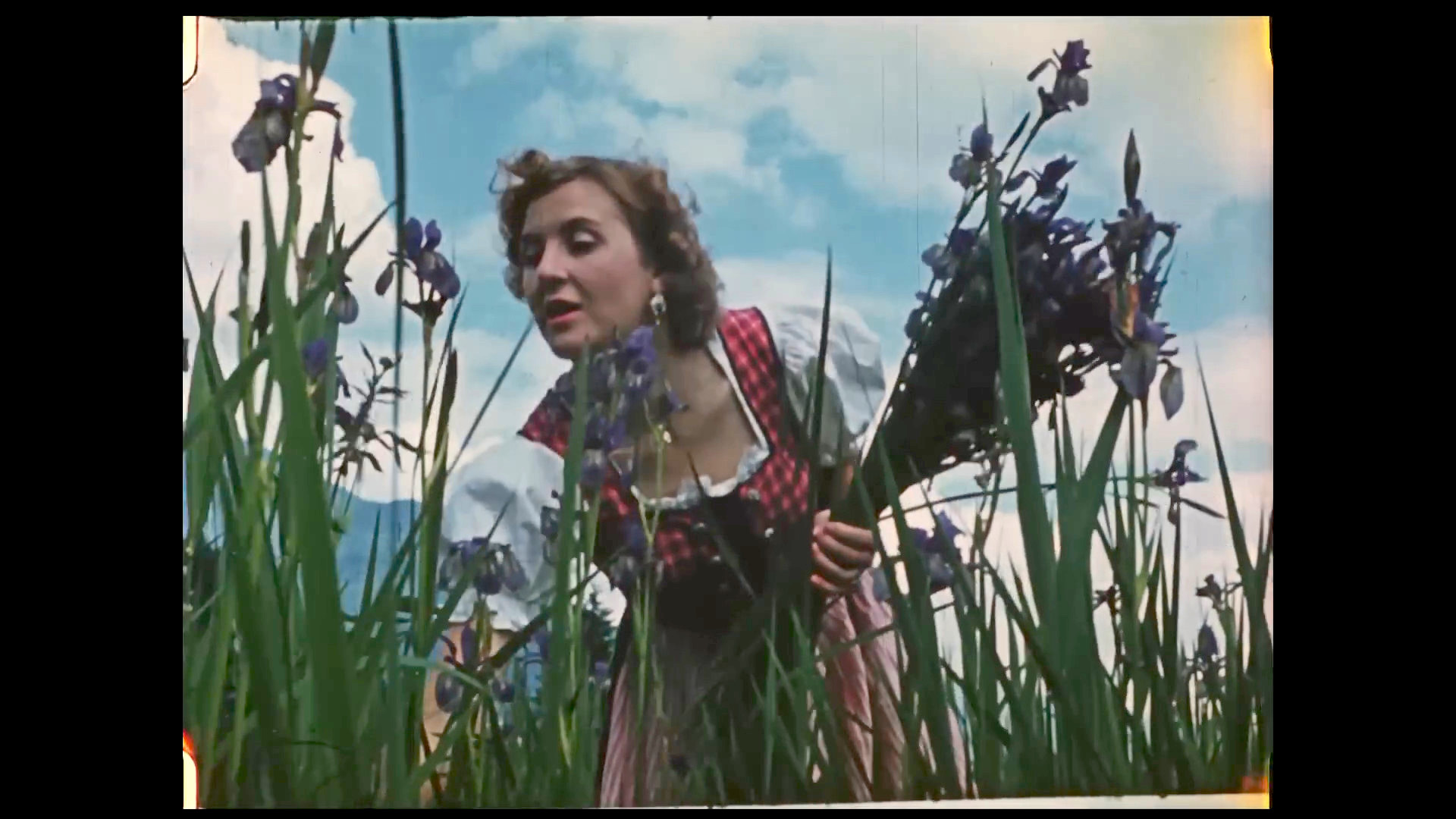
Screenshot from Eva Braun's private films

The footage's first integration into a German production occurred with Bis fünf nach zwölf (DE, 1953). Lutz Becker's Swastika (GB, 1973) marks the first correct attribution of the material to Eva Braun. The film presents it in its original color format with post-synchronized audio. Later works, including Hitler's Private World (GB, 2006), Moloch (RU, 1999), and Adolf and Eva (DE, 2008), further contextualized the footage within historical and cinematic narratives. Serge Viallet's Mystères d'archives episode (FR, 2015) remains one of the most rigorous scholarly analyses of the films, examining their production, preservation, and evolving historical significance.
