= Paul Seligman =

Philosopher (1903–1985)

- Born: 1903; Bingen am Rhein, Germany
- Died: March 2, 1985 (aged 81–82); Waterloo, Ontario, Canada
- Occupations: Scholar, Teacher

Academic background
- Education: Ph. D. Philosophy

Academic work
- Discipline: Philosophy, Metaphysics
- Institutions: University of London, University of Waterloo
- Notable works: The Apeiron of Anaximander: A Study in the Origin and Function of Metaphysical Ideas. Being and Not-Being: An Introduction to Plato's Sophist.

Paul Seligman was a teacher and scholar born in 1903 in Bingen am Rhein, Germany.

During the Nazi rise to power, he was involved in the creation of at least three documentary films alongside Ella Bergmann-Michel as a producer, creating an essay pleading that film should remain independent and free for one of the films. After this initial collaboration was eventually made to stop, he made a film of his own called Frühjahr 1933 (Spring 1933).

He left Germany in 1936 pushed by Nazi occupation, moving to the United Kingdom, where he eventually enrolled in Birkbeck, University of London, to study philosophy, finishing his Ph. D. degree in 1956. In 1963 he moved to Waterloo, Ontario, becoming a teacher in philosophy and was awarded with the title of Distinguished Professors Emeriti on 22nd May 1975.

After brain haemorrhage, Paul Seligman passed away in University Hospital (London, Ontario) the 2nd of March 1985, receiving an In Memoriam by the University of Cambridge. Soon after, the University of Waterloo begun offering a scholarship to his name.

Throughout his last days of life, he was part of the C. G. Jung foundation in the Toronto Branch, becoming the first president of said foundation, and actively gave seminars to University of Waterloo students regarding Jungian thought and psychology.

In 2019, one of his three films was shown. The German Historical Museum, alongside an exhibition of Ella Bergmann-Michel Die Frau mit der Kinamo (The Woman with the Kinamo), showed his unpublished film and an interview from 1976.

His most important works include "The Apeiron of Anaximander: A Study in the Origin and Function of Metaphysical Ideas", and "Being and Not-Being: An introduction to Plato's Sophist". There is also a mention of a third work, but it was never published.

== The Apeiron of Anaximander ==
The thesis turned book is a recollection and interpretation of the accounts and commentaries of The Apeiron(/əˈpaɪˌrɒn/; ἄπειρον) and the Adikia (ᾰ̓δῐκῐ́ᾱ) doctrine by philosophers including Aristotle, Theophrastus, Simplicius of Cilicia, amongst others.

Printed and published by the Athlone Press of the University of London in 1962, Seligman intended to reshape the understanding contemporary scholars had of the Apeiron and the Adikia by separating the concepts and attempting an understanding of the philosophical value in regards to metaphysics, and to uncover disregarded aspects of Anaximander's thought and works.

The book is separated into three main themes, and within the 15 chapters, Seligman attempts to reveal the real meaning of the Apeiron and where it could have emerged, understanding Anaximander's view as a natural evolution from initial cosmogonical and cosmological theories through history, and proposing that Metaphysics is a rational field that gives impulse to tangible science while trying to demonstrate how Anaximander was that initial philosopher who moved his work away from mythos, creating a principle that surpassed the metaphysical idea and turned into the basis of philosophical development.

The book also serves as a mild critique to Aristotle's way of work, despite his understanding of the importance of Aristotle in the shaping of what we know about Anaximander.
