= Va banque (film) =

1920 film

- Directed by: Léo Lasko
- Written by: Georg Jacoby; Robert Liebmann
- Starring: Fritz Kortner; Edith Meller; Meinhart Maur
- Cinematography: Willy Großstück
- Production company: Titanic Film
- Distributed by: UFA
- Release date: 27 June 1920
- Country: Germany
- Languages: Silent; German intertitles

Va banque is a 1920 German silent drama film directed by Léo Lasko and starring Fritz Kortner, Edith Meller and Meinhart Maur. It premiered at the Marmorhaus in Berlin.

The film's sets were designed by the art directors Robert A. Dietrich and Robert Neppach.

== Cast ==
- Fritz Kortner as S. M. Wulff
- Edith Meller as Hella
- Meinhart Maur as Krojanker
- Charles Willy Kayser as Herbert von Hochberg
- Erich Pabst as Kammerdiener Aristid
- Niels Prien as Prinz Isenburg
- Gerhard Ritterband as Piccolo Fritz
- Fritz Beckmann as Buchmacher Korn
- Paul Biensfeldt
- Hugo Flink

== Bibliography ==
- Bock, Hans-Michael & Bergfelder, Tim. The Concise CineGraph. Encyclopedia of German Cinema. Berghahn Books, 2009.
