= The Rhineland Girl =

1930 film

- Directed by: Johannes Meyer
- Written by: Fritz Falkenstein; Walter Wassermann
- Produced by: Gustav Althoff
- Starring: Gretel Berndt; Lucie Englisch; Werner Fuetterer
- Cinematography: Charles J. Stumar
- Music by: Willy Ostermann
- Production company: Aco-Film
- Distributed by: Siegel Monopolfilm
- Release date: 6 May 1930
- Running time: 79 minutes
- Country: Germany
- Language: German

The Rhineland Girl (German: Das Rheinlandmädel) is a 1930 German musical romance film directed by Johannes Meyer and starring Gretel Berndt, Lucie Englisch and Werner Fuetterer.

== Cast ==
- Gretel Berndt as Lore
- Lucie Englisch as Mizzi
- Werner Fuetterer as Hans Waldorf
- Trude Berliner as Grete
- Ilse Nast as Ilse
- Ernst Dernburg
- Harry Frank
- George Pleß
- Ernst Behmer
- Max Wilmsen

== Bibliography ==
- Krautz, Alfred (1984). International Directory of Cinematographers, Set- and Costume Designers in Film. Vol. 4. Saur. ISBN 978-3-598-21434-9.
