= Ninety Minute Stopover =

1936 film directed by Harry Piel

- Directed by: Harry Piel
- Written by: Harald Bratt
- Produced by: Ludwig Behrends
- Starring: Harry Piel; Alexander Golling; Else von Möllendorff; Genia Nikolaieva
- Cinematography: Wilhelm Schmidt; Fritz von Friedl
- Edited by: Wolfgang Becker
- Music by: Ernst Leenen
- Production company: Ariel-Film
- Release date: 25 September 1936
- Running time: 86 minutes
- Country: Germany
- Language: German

Ninety Minute Stopover (German: Neunzig Minuten Aufenthalt) is a 1936 German adventure crime film directed by and starring Harry Piel. It also features Alexander Golling, Else von Möllendorff and Genia Nikolaieva. It was shot at the Grunewald Studios of Tobis Film in Berlin and On location in Lisbon. The film's sets were designed by the art directors Wilhelm Depenau and Karl Vollbrecht.

== Synopsis ==
Berlin police officer Harry Winkler stops off in Lisbon before his ship sails to Buenos Aires where he is to take part in a boxing tournament. He joins forces with his friend from Scotland Yard Conny Steven to help a young woman whose relative appears to have vanished and been replaced by another man.

== Cast ==
- Harry Piel as Harry Winkler
- Alexander Golling as Conny Steven
- Else von Möllendorff as Ilse Siebeck
- Elisabeth Eygk as Madeleine Ribail
- Genia Nikolaieva as Madame Clermont
- Hans Zesch-Ballot Alberto Basto
- Klaus Pohl as Ein Sekretär
- Eduard von Winterstein Kriminalkommissar Winkler
- Hugo Werner-Kahle
- Ernst Albert Schaach
- Max Diekmann
- Paul Samson-Körner
- Franz Kossak
- Rolf Becker
- Kurt Hinz
- Ruth Beyer
- Ingeborg Carlsson
- Gustav Püttjer
- Peter Erkelenz

== Bibliography ==
- Rentschler, Eric. The Ministry of Illusion: Nazi Cinema and Its Afterlife. Harvard University Press, 1996.
