= The Love Commandment =

1928 film

- Lilian Harvey in a scene from the film
- German: Du sollst nicht stehlen
- Directed by: Victor Janson
- Written by: Robert Liebmann
- Produced by: Richard Eichberg
- Starring: Werner Fuetterer; Dina Gralla; Lilian Harvey
- Cinematography: Walter Harvey-Pape; Eduard Hoesch
- Music by: Walter Winnig
- Production company: Richard Eichberg-Film
- Distributed by: UFA
- Release date: 8 February 1928
- Country: Germany
- Languages: Silent; German intertitles

The Love Commandment or Thou Shalt Not Steal (German: Du sollst nicht stehlen) is a 1928 German silent film directed by Victor Janson and starring Werner Fuetterer, Dina Gralla and Lilian Harvey.

The film's art direction was by Jacek Rotmil.

== Cast ==
- Werner Fuetterer as Raul Warburg
- Dina Gralla as Yvonne Warburg, his sister
- Lilian Harvey as Lotte
- Bruno Kastner as Robert Erler
- Charlotte Susa as Lilly
- Erich Kaiser-Titz as Detective
- Ernst Behmer as Franz, Diener bei Warburg
- Nico Turoff as burglar
