= The Night Without Pause =

1931 German film

- Directed by: Andrew Marton; Franz Wenzler
- Written by: Franz Arnold (play); Ernst Bach (play); Bobby E. Lüthge; Willy Prager
- Produced by: Joe Pasternak
- Starring: Sig Arno; Camilla Horn; Max Adalbert
- Cinematography: Károly Vass
- Edited by: Wolfgang Becker
- Music by: Otto Stransky
- Production companies: Deutsche Universal-Film; Tobis Film
- Distributed by: Deutsche Universal-Film
- Release date: 22 December 1931
- Running time: 87 minutes
- Country: Germany
- Language: German

The Night Without Pause (German: Die Nacht ohne Pause) is a 1931 German comedy film directed by Andrew Marton and Franz Wenzler and starring Sig Arno, Camilla Horn and Max Adalbert. It was made by the German subsidiary of Universal Pictures in partnership with Tobis Film. It was shot at the Johannisthal Studios in Berlin. The film's sets were designed by Fritz Maurischat and Gabriel Pellon. It is based on the farce Der keusche Lebemann by Ernst Bach and Franz Arnold, and was remade in 1952.

== Synopsis ==
When his wife becomes suspicious that he is having an affair after discovering incriminating evidence, Julius Seipold manages to convince her that it is his innocuous assistant Max who is having a relationship. He invents a wild backstory about Max, which in turn fascinates Julius Seipold's daughter Gertie.

== Cast ==
- Sig Arno as Max Stieglitz
- Camilla Horn as Letta Larbo
- Max Adalbert as Julius Seipold
- Ida Wüst as Regine Seipold
- Ilse Korseck as Gertie Seipold
- Paul Richter as Walter Reimann, Filmregisseur
- Willy Stettner as Heinz Fellner
- Annemarie Hase as Anna, Dienstmädchen
- Walter Steiner as Kinodirektor
- Karl Harbacher as Friseur
- Hans Richter as Piccolo
- Gustl Gstettenbaur as Bürolehrling bei Stieglitz

== Bibliography ==
- Waldman, Harry (2008). Nazi Films in America, 1933–1942. McFarland. ISBN 978-0-7864-3861-7.
