= The Dagger of Malaya =

1919 film

- Directed by: Léo Lasko
- Written by: Richard Hutter
- Produced by: Paul Davidson
- Starring: Carl Auen; Bernhard Goetzke; Victor Janson
- Cinematography: Willy Großstück
- Production company: PAGU
- Distributed by: UFA
- Release date: 11 November 1919
- Country: Germany
- Languages: Silent; German intertitles

The Dagger of Malaya (German: Der Dolch des Malayen) is a 1919 German silent crime film directed by Léo Lasko and starring Carl Auen, Bernhard Goetzke, and Victor Janson. It is part of the Joe Deebs detective series films.

The film's sets were designed by the art director Kurt Richter.

== Cast ==
- Carl Auen as Joe Deebs, private investigator
- Louis Brody as Jack Johnson
- Blandine Ebinger as Angelina
- Bernhard Goetzke as Yschutschur, a malayan coachman
- Victor Janson as trader Harald Hastings
- Flockina von Platen as Stella Hastings

== Bibliography ==
- Bock, Hans-Michael; Bergfelder, Tim, eds. (2009). The Concise Cinegraph: Encyclopaedia of German Cinema. New York: Berghahn Books. ISBN 978-1-57181-655-9.
