= The Secret of Santa Maria =

1921 film

- Directed by: Lothar Mendes
- Written by: Otto Krack; Lothar Mendes; Arthur Schetter
- Produced by: Michael Bohnen
- Cinematography: Curt Courant
- Production company: Michael Bohnen-Film
- Distributed by: Orbis-Film
- Release date: 4 November 1921
- Country: Germany
- Languages: Silent; German intertitles

The Secret of Santa Maria (German:Das Geheimnis der Santa Maria) is a 1921 German silent film directed by Lothar Mendes.

The film's sets were designed by the art director Julian Ballenstedt.

== Cast ==
In alphabetical order

- Michael Bohnen
- Louis Brody
- Karl Etlinger
- Maria Forescu
- Rudolf Forster
- Käthe Haack
- Eugen Jensen
- Georg John
- Robert Leffler
- Olga Limburg
- Edith Meller
- Paul Rehkopf
- Georg H. Schnell
- Fritz Schulz
- Herbert Stock
- Hanni Weisse

== Bibliography ==
- Hans-Michael Bock and Tim Bergfelder. The Concise Cinegraph: An Encyclopedia of German Cinema. Berghahn Books.
