= Benjamin the Timid =

1916 film

- Directed by: William Karfiol
- Written by: William Karfiol
- Produced by: William Karfiol
- Starring: Senta Söneland; Reinhold Schünzel; Wilhelm Diegelmann
- Production company: Karfiol-Film
- Release date: December 1916
- Country: Germany
- Languages: Silent; German intertitles

Benjamin the Timid (German: Benjamin, der Schüchterne) is a 1916 German silent comedy film directed by William Karfiol and starring Senta Söneland, Reinhold Schünzel and Wilhelm Diegelmann.

== Cast ==
- Reinhold Schünzel
- Senta Söneland
- Wilhelm Diegelmann
- Edith Meller
- Ida Perry

== Bibliography ==
- Bock, Hans-Michael; Bergfelder, Tim, eds. (2009). The Concise Cinegraph: Encyclopaedia of German Cinema. New York: Berghahn Books. ISBN 978-1-57181-655-9.
