= I Entrust My Wife to You =

1943 film

- Directed by: Kurt Hoffmann
- Written by: Johann von Vásáry (play); Bobby E. Lüthge; Erich Kästner; Helmut Weiss
- Produced by: Heinz Rühmann
- Starring: Heinz Rühmann; Adina Mandlová; Werner Fuetterer; Else von Möllendorff
- Cinematography: Willy Winterstein
- Edited by: Elisabeth Pewny
- Music by: Franz Grothe
- Production company: Terra Film
- Distributed by: Deutsche Filmvertriebs
- Release date: 2 April 1943
- Running time: 88 minutes
- Country: Germany
- Language: German

I Entrust My Wife to You (German: Ich vertraue Dir meine Frau an) is a 1943 German comedy film directed by Kurt Hoffmann and starring Heinz Rühmann, Adina Mandlová, and Werner Fuetterer. It was shot at the Babelsberg Studios in Berlin. The film's sets were designed by the art director Willi Herrmann.

== Synopsis ==
In order to keep an eye on his wife, who he suspects of wishing to commit adultery while he is away at an international conference, an inventor asks his friend to keep any eye on her. His wife in turn suspects that he is planning to have an affair with his secretary while he is away.

== Cast ==
- Heinz Rühmann as Peter Trost
- Adina Mandlová as Ellinor Deinhardt
- Werner Fuetterer as Robert
- Else von Möllendorff as Lil
- Arthur Schröder as Kurt
- Paul Dahlke as Boxer Alois
- Kurt von Ruffin as Fred Hansen
- Alexa von Porembsky as housemaid
- Willy Witte as Fritz
- Ingrid Ostermann as Mary
- Wilhelm Bendow as bartender
- Clemens Hasse as lifeguard
- Gerhard Bienert as traffic policeman
- Walter Bechmann as the Police Commissioner
- Charly Berger as a policeman on the beat
- Fritz Busch as a guest in the Bar Astoria
- Wolfgang Dohnberg as a guest in the Bar Astoria
- Fritz Draeger as a guest in the Bar Astoria
- Werner Gillkötter as a guest in the Bar Astoria
- Karl Heidmann as the porter in the Continental
- Oskar Höcker as porter no. 6
- Ingrid Lutz as Lil's friend
- Ferdinand Robert as a guest in the Bar Astoria
- S. O. Schoening as a guest in the Bar Astoria
- Sergei Woischeff as a barman in the Bar Astoria
- Erwin Biegel as traveller
- Ralph Lothar as a hairdresser
- Hans Meyer-Hanno as policeman
- Ernst Rotmund as a guest on the telephone
- Ernst Schiffner

== Bibliography ==
- Bock, Hans-Michael; Bergfelder, Tim, eds. (2009). The Concise Cinegraph: Encyclopaedia of German Cinema. New York: Berghahn Books. ISBN 978-1-57181-655-9.
- Hake, Sabine (2001). Popular Cinema of the Third Reich. Austin: University of Texas Press. ISBN 978-0-292-73458-6.
