= Willy Stettner =

- Born: 16 July 1895; Darmstadt, German Empire
- Died: 3 November 1961 (aged 66); Hamburg, West Germany
- Occupations: Actor, singer
- Years active: 1921–1955 (film)

Willy Stettner (1895–1961) was a German singer and stage and film actor.

== Selected filmography ==
- The Land of Smiles (1930)
- How Do I Become Rich and Happy? (1930)
- The Night Without Pause (1931)
- Victoria and Her Hussar (1931)
- Schubert's Dream of Spring (1931)
- Quick (1932)
- The Four from Bob 13 (1932)
- Daughter of the Regiment (1933)
- Madame Wants No Children (1933)
- A Thousand for One Night (1933)
- Ball at the Savoy (1935)
- Twilight (1940)
- The Last Man (1955)

== Bibliography ==
- Erika Wottrich. Deutsche Universal.: Transatlantische Verleih- und Produktionsstrategien eines Hollywood-Studios in den 20er und 30er Jahren.. 2001.
