= The Girl with the Whip =

1929 film

- Directed by: Carl Lamac
- Written by: Hans H. Zerlett (play); Walter Wassermann
- Produced by: Victor Skutezky
- Starring: Anny Ondra; Werner Fuetterer; Sig Arno; Olga Limburg
- Cinematography: Otto Heller
- Production company: Hom-AG für Filmfabrikation
- Distributed by: Süd-Film
- Release date: 28 November 1929
- Running time: 85 minutes
- Country: Germany
- Languages: Silent; German intertitles

The Girl with the Whip (German: Das Mädel mit der Peitsche) is a 1929 German silent comedy film directed by Carl Lamac and starring Anny Ondra, Werner Fuetterer and Sig Arno. It was shot at the Johannisthal Studios in Berlin. The film's art direction was by Heinrich Richter. It was based on a play by Hans H. Zerlett.

== Cast ==
- Anny Ondra as Anny Nebenkrug
- Werner Fuetterer as Edgar Krell
- Sig Arno as Onkel Axmann
- Gaston Jacquet as Professor Nebenkrug
- Olga Limburg as Frau Professor Nebenkrug
- Mimo von Delly as Mimi Gwenda, Tänzerin
- Julius E. Herrmann
- Karl Harbacher
- Gerhard Ritterband
- Josef Rovenský
- Oreste Bilancia
- Paul Goergens

== Bibliography ==
- Prawer, S.S. Between Two Worlds: The Jewish Presence in German and Austrian Film, 1910–1933. Berghahn Books, 2005.
