= Senta Söneland =

German actress (1882–1934)

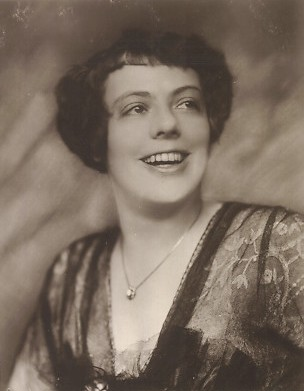
- Söneland in 1920. Photographed by Alexander Binder
- Born: 9 September 1882; Diedenhofen, Lothringen, German Empire
- Died: 20 July 1934 (aged 51); Berlin, Germany
- Occupation: Actress
- Years active: 1915–1934 (film)

Senta Söneland (9 September 1882 – 20 July 1934) was a German stage and film actress.

== Selected filmography ==
- The Canned Bride (1915)
- Benjamin the Timid (1916)
- The King of Paris (1930)
- The Copper (1930)
- Susanne Cleans Up (1930)
- Road to Rio (1931)
- Poor as a Church Mouse (1931)
- Die Bräutigamswitwe (1931)
- The Adventurer of Tunis (1931)
- My Heart Longs for Love (1931)
- Peace of Mind (1931)
- The Daredevil (1931)
- The Unknown Guest (1931)
- Scandal on Park Street (1932)
- The Secret of Johann Orth (1932)
- Two Lucky Days (1932)
- The Magic Top Hat (1932)
- Two Good Comrades (1933)
- Tell Me Who You Are (1933)
- North Pole, Ahoy (1934)

== Bibliography ==
- Ball, Robert Hamilton. Shakespeare on Silent Film: A Strange Eventful History. Routledge, 2013.
