= The Peak Scaler =

1933 film

- Directed by: Franz Wenzler
- Written by: Curt J. Braun; Bobby E. Lüthge; Walter Schmidtkunz
- Produced by: Robert Ernst; Peter Ostermayr
- Starring: Franz Schmid; Walter Krieger; Mizzl Bardorf
- Cinematography: Karl Attenberger
- Edited by: Paul May
- Music by: Giuseppe Becce
- Production company: Nostra-Film
- Distributed by: Siegel-Monopolfilm
- Release date: 7 April 1933
- Running time: 83 minutes
- Country: Germany
- Language: German

The Peak Scaler (German: Gipfelstürmer) is a 1933 German drama film directed by Franz Wenzler and starring Franz Schmid, Walter Krieger and Mizzl Bardorf.

The film's art direction was by Otto Erdmann and Hans Sohnle.

== Cast ==
- Franz Schmid as Franzl Schmid
- Walter Krieger as Bertl
- Mizzl Bardorf as Mizzl
- Anni Trautner as Die Zimmervermieterin
- Traudl Ertl as Traudl
- Theodor Loos as Ein Herr im Hotel
- Paul Rehkopf as Der Grenzbeamte
- Emil Matousek as Winkelmann
- Theo Lingen as Ein Kellner
- Gustl Gstettenbaur as Ein Pikkolo
- Heini Aberle as Edwin, Handwerksbursche
- Hans Schurich as August, Handwerksbursche

== Bibliography ==
- Waldman, Harry (2008). Nazi Films in America, 1933–1942. McFarland. ISBN 978-0-7864-3861-7.
