= Else von Möllendorff =

German actress (1913–1982)

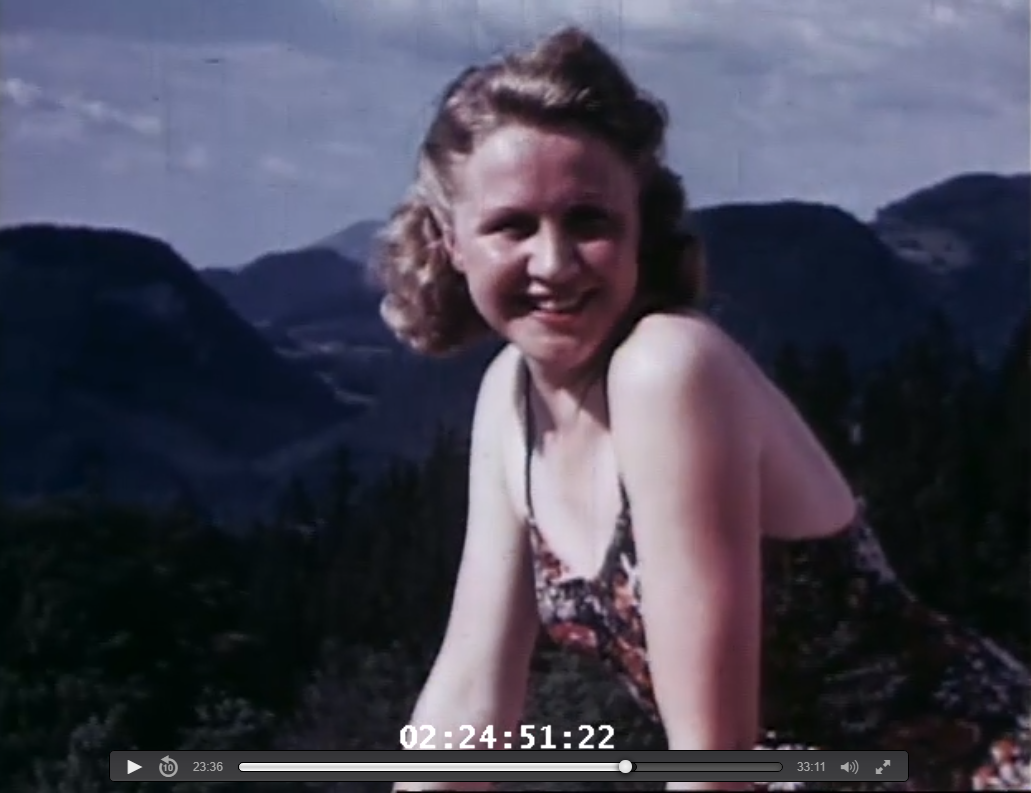
- Born: 29 December 1913; Munich, Bavaria; German Empire
- Died: 28 July 1982 (aged 68); Lübeck, Schleswig-Holstein; West Germany
- Occupation: Film actress
- Years active: 1935–1950

Else von Möllendorff (29 December 1913 – 28 July 1982) was a German film actress who appeared in a mixture of lead and supporting roles during the Nazi and post-war eras.

== Partial filmography ==
- Ein falscher Fuffziger (1935) - Hilde Werner, Verkäuferin
- Ninety Minute Stopover (1936) - Ilse Siebeck
- Schüsse in Kabine 7 (1938) - Die Schiffsstewardeß
- Napoleon Is to Blame for Everything (1938) - Pünktchen (Madeleine)
- Ich verweigere die Aussage (1939) - Inge Rodeck, seine Frau
- The Scoundrel (1939) - Gusti Pitzinger
- In letzter Minute (1939) - Else
- Verwandte sind auch Menschen (1940) - Grete Braun
- The Fox of Glenarvon (1940) - Mary-Ann O'Connor
- Aus erster Ehe (1940) - Marion Dux
- Am Abend auf der Heide (1941) - Evi Birkner, Schauspielerin
- Familienanschluß (1941) - Helga Timm
- Mistress Moon (1941) - Traute
- Drei tolle Mädels (1942) - Inge
- Beloved World (1942) - Rosi Hübner - Sekretärin
- I Entrust My Wife to You (1943) - Lil
- When the Young Wine Blossoms (1943) - Helene Arvik
- Alles aus Liebe (1943) - Liesl Dörfler - seine Frau
- Herr Sanders lebt gefährlich (1944) - Ellen Hinz, Sekretärin
- Ich habe von dir geträumt (1944) - Helene
- Peter Voss, Thief of Millions (1946) - Polly Petterson
- Finale (1948) - Schwester Marianne
- Verlobte Leute (1950) - Bärbel, die Dame auf dem Bild (final film role)

== Bibliography ==
- Fox, Jo (2007) [2006]. Film propaganda in Britain and Nazi Germany: World War II Cinema. Oxford: Berg. ISBN 978-1-85973-896-2.
- Giesen, Rolf (2003). Nazi Propaganda Films: A History and Filmography. Jefferson, NC: McFarland. ISBN 978-0-7864-3870-9.
