= Streak of Steel =

1935 film

- Directed by: Franz Wenzler
- Written by: Helmut Brandis; Heinrich Oberländer; Helena von Fortenbach
- Produced by: Bob Stoll
- Starring: Karl Ludwig Diehl; Dorothea Wieck; Friedl Haerlin
- Cinematography: Alexander von Lagorio
- Music by: Marc Roland
- Production company: Pallas Film
- Release date: 29 January 1935
- Running time: 91 minutes
- Country: Germany
- Language: German

Streak of Steel (German: Der stählerne Strahl) is a 1935 sports film directed by Franz Wenzler and starring Karl Ludwig Diehl, Dorothea Wieck and Friedl Haerlin. It was shot at the Johannisthal Studios in Berlin and on location at the city's AVUS Race Track. The film's sets were designed by the art directors Gabriel Pellon and Carl Böhm.

== Synopsis ==
Racing driver Michael Tetjus returns from America to Berlin having broken a world record. His relationship with his wife the film actress Katja is strained due to their respective focus on work. Michael is intrigued by a new turbine being designed by his friend the engineer Zöger ANZ his assistant Enja.

== Cast ==
- Karl Ludwig Diehl as Michael Tetjus
- Dorothea Wieck as Wiggers, Enja
- Friedl Haerlin as Katja Lorenz
- Alexander Golling as Zöger
- Paul Bildt as Halliant
- Eduard von Winterstein as Der Notar
- Walter Franck as Der Regisseur
- Henry Lorenzen as Pieselang, Aufnahmeleiter
- Albert Hörrmann
- Josefine Dora
- Hugo Werner-Kahle
- F.W. Schröder-Schrom
- Grete Reinwald

== Bibliography ==
- Klaus, Ulrich J. Deutsche Tonfilme: Jahrgang 1935. Klaus-Archiv, 1988.
- Kreimeier, Klaus. The Ufa Story: A History of Germany's Greatest Film Company, 1918-1945. University of California Press, 1999.
