= Three Waiting Maids =

1925 film directed by Carl Boese

- Theatrical film poster
- German: Die drei Portiermädel
- Directed by: Carl Boese
- Written by: Margarete M. Langen
- Starring: Hanni Weisse; Maly Delschaft; Bruno Kastner
- Cinematography: Alfred Hansen
- Production company: Terra Film
- Distributed by: Terra Film
- Release date: 1 August 1925
- Country: Germany
- Languages: Silent; German intertitles

Three Waiting Maids (German: Die drei Portiermädel) is a 1925 German silent comedy film directed by Carl Boese and starring Hanni Weisse, Maly Delschaft, and Bruno Kastner. It was remade in 1932 as Mrs. Lehmann's Daughters and the 1933 Swedish film Marriageable Daughters.

The film's sets were designed by the art director Robert A. Dietrich.

Maly Delschaft, Hanni Weisse and Helga Molander

== Cast ==
- Hanni Weisse as Amelie, waiting maid
- Maly Delschaft as Martha, waiting maid
- Bruno Kastner as Hans Brandstetter
- Margarete Kupfer as mother
- Helga Molander as Annie, waiting maid
- Jakob Tiedtke as Leopold Siedentopf
- Hugo Fischer-Köppe as Franz, Brandstetter's chauffeur
- Harry Halm as Emil Kummerbach, bartender
- Hermann Picha as photographer

== See also ==
- Giftasvuxna döttrar (1933)
- Les Filles de la concierge (1934)
