= Mrs. Lehmann's Daughters =

1932 film

- Directed by: Carl Heinz Wolff
- Written by: Marcel Lion; Franz Rauch (book)
- Starring: Hansi Niese; Hertha Thiele; Else Elster
- Cinematography: Georg Muschner
- Music by: Franz Doelle
- Production company: Kowo-Tonfilm
- Distributed by: Terra Film
- Release date: 11 June 1932
- Running time: 92 minutes
- Country: Germany
- Language: German

Mrs. Lehmann's Daughters (German: Frau Lehmanns Töchter) is a 1932 German comedy film directed by Carl Heinz Wolff and starring Hansi Niese, Hertha Thiele, and Else Elster. It was shot at the Terra Studios in Berlin. It is a remake of the 1925 silent film Three Waiting Maids. A Swedish remake Marriageable Daughters was produced the following year.

== Cast ==
- Hansi Niese as Frau Ottilie Lehmann, Portiersfrau
- Hertha Thiele as Emma, Tochter
- Else Elster as Gerda, Tochter
- Carla Carlsen as Lissy, Tochter
- Fritz Kampers as Chauffeur Köster
- Heinz Klingenberg as Bankier Stegerwald
- Anton Pointner as Bankier
- Sigurd Lohde as Konditor Holler

== Bibliography ==
- Bock, Hans-Michael; Bergfelder, Tim, eds. (2009). The Concise Cinegraph: Encyclopaedia of German Cinema. New York: Berghahn Books. ISBN 978-1-57181-655-9.
- Klaus, Ulrich J. Deutsche Tonfilme: Jahrgang 1932. Klaus-Archiv, 1988.
