= Ilse Korseck =

German actress (1911–1933)

- Born: 12 May 1911; Breslau, Silesia, German Empire
- Died: 22 February 1933 (aged 21); Potsdam, Brandenburg, Nazi Germany
- Occupation: Actress
- Years active: 1930–1933 (film)

Ilse Korseck (1911–1933) was a German stage and film actress. After working initially in theatre she began to appear in films from 1930 onwards during the early sound era. In 1933 she died suddenly at the age of twenty one.

== Selected filmography ==
- How Do I Become Rich and Happy? (1930)
- The Shot in the Sound Film Studio (1930)
- The Trunks of Mr. O.F. (1931)
- The Night Without Pause (1931)
- A Blonde Dream (1932)
- When Love Sets the Fashion (1932)
- Scandal on Park Street (1932)
- The Importance of Being Earnest (1932)
- The Pride of Company Three (1932)
- Madame Makes Her Exit (1932)
- What Men Know (1933)

== Bibliography ==
- Christopher Young. The Films of Hedy Lamarr. Citadel Press, 1978.
