= Wedding at Lake Wolfgang =

- Directed by: Hans Behrendt
- Written by: Werner Buhre; Robert Gilbert
- Produced by: Hans Geishauer
- Starring: Hugo Schrader; Gustl Gstettenbaur; Oskar Sima
- Cinematography: Georg Bruckbauer; Reimar Kuntze
- Edited by: Willy Zeunert
- Music by: Rudolf Perak; Robert Stolz
- Production company: Patria-Film
- Release date: 9 October 1933
- Country: Germany
- Language: German

Wedding at Lake Wolfgang (German: Hochzeit am Wolfgangsee) is a 1933 German musical film directed by Hans Behrendt and starring Hugo Schrader, Gustl Gstettenbaur and Oskar Sima. Made at the end of the Weimar Republic, it had release problems due to Nazi objections to the film's Jewish director.

The film's sets were designed by the art director Hermann Warm. It was shot at the Halensee Studios in Berlin with location shooting in the German capital and at Lake Wolfgang in Austria.

== Cast ==
- Hugo Schrader as Hans Leitner, Besitzer des "Posthof"
- Gustl Gstettenbaur as Peterl, sein jüngerer Bruder
- Rose Stradner as Rosl
- Hansi Niese as Vevi
- Oskar Sima as Sebastian Hupfinger, Zuckerbäcker aus Wien
- Gerhard Ritterband as Gustav, sein Lehrjunge
- Hans Junkermann as Mr. Williams, Revuedirektor
- Max Gülstorff as Van Molden, sein Finanzier
- Else Elster as Mary, Williams' Tochter
- Eduard von Winterstein as Bürgermeister von St. Wolfgang
- Oscar Sabo as Der Landarzt
- Jack Hammer as Singer

== Bibliography ==
- Bock, Hans-Michael & Bergfelder, Tim. The Concise Cinegraph: Encyclopaedia of German Cinema. Berghahn Books, 2009.
- Klaus, Ulrich J. Deutsche Tonfilme: Jahrgang 1933. Klaus-Archiv, 1988.
