= Schubert's Dream of Spring =

1931 film directed by Richard Oswald

- Directed by: Richard Oswald
- Written by: Leo Lasko; Arthur Rebner
- Produced by: Erich Morawsky; Richard Oswald
- Starring: Carl Jöken; Gretl Theimer; Alfred Läutner; Willy Stettner
- Cinematography: Willy Goldberger
- Edited by: Paul Falkenberg
- Music by: Felix Günther
- Production company: Richard-Oswald-Produktion
- Distributed by: Atlas-Filmverleih
- Release date: 30 January 1931 (Berlin)
- Running time: 90 minutes
- Country: Germany
- Language: German

Schubert's Dream of Spring (German: Schubert's Frühlingstraum) is a 1931 German musical film directed by Richard Oswald and starring Carl Jöken, Gretl Theimer and Alfred Läutner. It was shot at the Halensee Studios in Berlin with sets designed by the art director Franz Schroedter. It is a biopic of the Austrian composer Franz Schubert (1797–1828). It was one of two films along with Vienna, City of Song (1930) with which the director paid musical tribute to his native city Vienna.

== Cast ==
- Carl Jöken as Franz Schubert
- Gretl Theimer as Maria Esterhazy
- Alfred Läutner as Graf Esterhazy
- Willy Stettner as Von Fekete, his future son-in-law
- Lucie Englisch as Therese, inn keeper of the 'Höldrichsmühle'
- Sig Arno as Ferdi Klebinder
- Oskar Sima as Sepp, cooper at the 'Höldrichsmühle'
- Gustl Gstettenbaur as Schani, apprentice waiter in the 'Höldrichsmühle'
- Fritz Kampers
- Max Hansen
- Paul Morgan

== Bibliography ==
- Bock, Hans-Michael; Bergfelder, Tim, eds. (2009). The Concise Cinegraph: Encyclopaedia of German Cinema. New York: Berghahn Books. ISBN 978-1-57181-655-9.
- Prawer, Siegbert Salomon (2005). Between Two Worlds: The Jewish Presence in German and Austrian Film, 1910–1933. New York: Berghahn Books. ISBN 978-1-84545-074-8.
