= Marriage with Limited Liability =

1931 film

- Directed by: Franz Wenzler
- Written by: Curt J. Braun; Bobby E. Lüthge
- Based on: Causa Kaiser by Adolf Eisler and Ludwig Stärk
- Produced by: Felix Pfitzner; Ilja Salkind
- Starring: Charlotte Susa; Georg Alexander; Paul Morgan
- Cinematography: Carl Drews
- Edited by: Hermann Haller
- Music by: Walter Jurmann; Bronislau Kaper
- Production company: T.K. Tonfilm-Produktion
- Distributed by: Deutsche Universal-Film
- Release date: 31 December 1931
- Running time: 75 minutes
- Countries: Austria; Germany
- Language: German

Marriage with Limited Liability (German: Ehe mit beschränkter Haftung) is a 1931 Austrian-German comedy film directed by Franz Wenzler, and starring Charlotte Susa, Georg Alexander, and Paul Morgan. The film is an adaptation of the popular 1917 play Causa Kaiser by Adolf Eisler and Ludwig Stärk. It was shot at the EFA Studios in Berlin. The film's sets were designed by the art directors Otto Erdmann and Hans Sohnle. It was released by the German subsidiary of Universal Pictures.

== Synopsis ==
For years the composer Georg Kaiser has been involved with his singer Irene, but never married her as he cannot get a divorce from his wife. When Irene's wealthy uncle dies he leaves her a fortune only if she is the wife of George Kaiser. Still unable to marry, the couple seize on a leaflet loophole - she would simply marry another man whose name is George Kaiser. They select a naive, office clerk who is swept off his feet by Irene without realising it is only a marriage of convenience.

== Cast ==
- Charlotte Susa as Irene Kaiser
- Georg Alexander as Dr. Wender, Lawyer
- Paul Morgan as Sr. Springer, Lawyer
- Hans Moser as Georg Kaiser II., Bürovorsteher
- Rosa Valetti
- Werner Fuetterer as Georg Kaiser I.
- Trude Brionne as Hühnerbein
- Tamara Desni
- Anita Mey
- Walter Steinbeck as Judge
- Edwin Jürgensen as Kabarettdirektor
- Gerhard Dammann as Gerichtsdiener

== Bibliography ==
- Klaus, Ulrich J. Deutsche Tonfilme: Jahrgang 1932. Klaus-Archiv, 1988.
- Parish, James Robert (1977). Film Actors Guide: Western Europe. Scarecrow Press. ISBN 978-0-8108-1044-0.
