= Flockina von Platen =

German actress

Flockina von Platen (14 May 1903 – 26 November 1984) was a German actress.

She was born in Stolp, Pomerania, Germany (now Słupsk, Pomeranian Voivodeship, Poland) and died at age 81 in West Berlin, West Germany.

== Selected filmography ==
- The Dagger of Malaya (1919)
- The Paw (1931)
- Spoiling the Game (1932)
- The Countess of Monte Cristo (1932)
- Quick (1932)
- Wrong Number, Miss (1932)
- The Valley of Love (1935)
- The Court Concert (1936)
- The Great and the Little Love (1938)
- Heimatland (1939)
- Nanette (1940)
- Kora Terry (1940)
- Uncle Kruger (1941)
- What Does Brigitte Want? (1941)
