= The Woman Without a Soul =

German silent film

- Directed by: Léo Lasko
- Written by: Georg Jacoby; Robert Liebmann
- Starring: Edith Meller; Werner Krauss; Alfred Abel
- Cinematography: Willy Großstück
- Production company: Titanic Film
- Release date: 13 May 1920
- Country: Germany
- Languages: Silent; German intertitles

The Woman Without a Soul (German: Die Frau ohne Seele) is a 1920 German silent film directed by Léo Lasko and starring Edith Meller, Werner Krauss and Alfred Abel.

The film's sets were designed by the art directors Robert A. Dietrich and Robert Neppach.

== Cast ==
- Edith Meller as Irene von Mengern
- Werner Krauss as Stephan Wulkowitz
- Alfred Abel as Gunar Magnussen
- Kurt Ehrle as Fabrikdirektor Brockmann
- Ferry Sikla as Bankier Steinberg
- Dora Tillmann as Lissy
- Dorrith van der Wyk as Anneliese, Kind von Brockmann
- Anna von Palen as Frau von Waldburg
- Marga Köhler

== Bibliography ==
- Bock, Hans-Michael & Bergfelder, Tim. The Concise CineGraph. Encyclopedia of German Cinema. Berghahn Books, 2009.
