= Bobby E. Lüthge =

German screenwriter (1891–1964)

Bobby E. Lüthge (12 September 1891 – 12 March 1964) was a German screenwriter.

== Selected filmography ==
- The Ocarina (1919)
- Mary Magdalene (1920)
- Catherine the Great (1920)
- The Girl from Acker Street (1920)
- The Island of the Lost (1921)
- The Poisoned Stream (1921)
- Treasure of the Aztecs (1921)
- Fridericus Rex (1922)
- Black Monday (1922)
- Christian Wahnschaffe (1920)
- The Young Man from the Ragtrade (1926)
- We'll Meet Again in the Heimat (1926)
- The Third Squadron (1926)
- Her Husband's Wife (1926)
- The Sporck Battalion (1927)
- The Woman with the World Record (1927)
- The Woman in the Cupboard (1927)
- The Bordello in Rio (1927)
- Modern Pirates (1928)
- Suzy Saxophone (1928)
- The Beloved of His Highness (1928)
- Sajenko the Soviet (1928)
- Spy of Madame Pompadour (1928)
- Docks of Hamburg (1928)
- The League of Three (1929)
- Revolt in the Batchelor's House (1929)
- Waterloo (1929)
- The Green Monocle (1929)
- Rooms to Let (1930)
- Three Days Confined to Barracks (1930)
- By a Nose (1931)
- Moritz Makes his Fortune (1931)
- Marriage with Limited Liability (1931)
- The Night Without Pause (1931)
- The Fate of Renate Langen (1931)
- Duty is Duty (1931)
- Terror of the Garrison (1931)
- Peace of Mind (1931)
- Road to Rio (1931)
- Scandal on Park Street (1932)
- Modern Dowry (1932)
- The Heath Is Green (1932)
- The Ladies Diplomat (1932)
- Two Good Comrades (1933)
- Bon Voyage (1933)
- The Gentleman from Maxim's (1933)
- The House of Dora Green (1933)
- The Peak Scaler (1933)
- Young Dessau's Great Love (1933)
- Hitlerjunge Quex (1933)
- Paprika (1933)
- Miss Liselott (1934)
- Financial Opportunists (1934)
- The Sporck Battalion (1934)
- The Csardas Princess (1934)
- The Valiant Navigator (1935)
- Lessons in Love (1935)
- Make Me Happy (1935)
- The Violet of Potsdamer Platz (1936)
- Adventure in Warsaw (1937)
- A Diplomatic Wife (1937)
- Seven Slaps (1937)
- The Barber of Seville (1938)
- Wibbel the Tailor (1939)
- I Entrust My Wife to You (1943)
- By a Nose (1949)
- I'll Never Forget That Night (1949)
- Nights on the Nile (1949)
- One Night Apart (1950)
- The Black Forest Girl (1950)
- The Heath Is Green (1951)
- The Csardas Princess (1951)
- Dark Eyes (1951)
- Pension Schöller (1952)
- At the Well in Front of the Gate (1952)
- Mikosch Comes In (1952)
- The Chaste Libertine (1952)
- The Prince of Pappenheim (1952)
- Red Roses, Red Lips, Red Wine (1953)
- The Great Lola (1954)
- Your Life Guards (1955)
- Three Girls from the Rhine (1955)
- My Aunt, Your Aunt (1956)
- Der Etappenhase (1957)

== Bibliography ==
- Davidson, John E & Hake, Sabina. Take Two: Fifties Cinema in Divided Germany. Berghahn Books, 2007.
