= Gertrud Wolle =

German actress

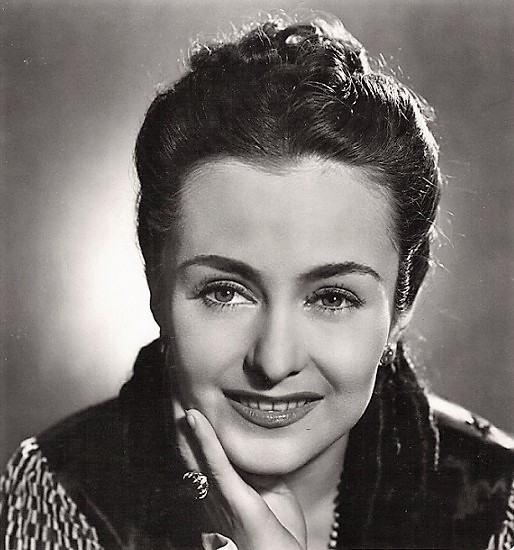
- Born: 11 March 1891; Urbis, Thann, Alsace; German Empire
- Died: 6 July 1952 (aged 61); Munich, West Germany
- Occupation: Film actor
- Years active: 1919–1952

Gertrud Wolle (11 March 1891 – 6 July 1952) was a German film actress.

Wolle worked as a nanny for two years and then attended drama school in Berlin. In September 1916, she joined the Deutsches Theater, where she made her debut in Goethe's Faust.

Early on, she was typecast on stage and in silent films as the eccentric older woman. With the introduction of sound films, she was cast in this role in an enormous number of productions. She played mostly small parts meant to amuse the audience as a shrill, ridiculous woman in the role of a secretary, teacher, headmistress, saleswoman, employee, or neighbor.

Due to her constant film work, she had little time for theater performances and only returned to the stage during the film-free period after 1945, for example at the Stadttheater Passau. After that, she was active in film again in her usual manner until her death. In 1944, she was included in the Reich Ministry of Public Enlightenment and Propaganda's Gottbegnadeten list.

== Selected filmography ==
- Die Insel der Glücklichen (1919)
- Prince Cuckoo (1919)
- Roswolsky's Mistress (1921)
- A Glass of Water (1923)
- Burglars (1930)
- The Three from the Filling Station (1930)
- Bombs on Monte Carlo (1931)
- The Spanish Fly (1931)
- The Private Secretary (1931)
- The Little Escapade (1931)
- The True Jacob (1931)
- Two Hearts Beat as One (1932)
- When Love Sets the Fashion (1932)
- Things Are Getting Better Already (1932)
- Girls to Marry (1932)
- The Beautiful Adventure (1932)
- The Importance of Being Earnest (1932)
- Viktor und Viktoria (1933)
- And Who Is Kissing Me? (1933)
- Tell Me Who You Are (1933)
- The English Marriage (1934)
- Enjoy Yourselves (1934)
- Music in the Blood (1934)
- Decoy (1934)
- A Night of Change (1935)
- The Higher Command (1935)
- Black Roses (1935)
- Das Einmaleins der Liebe (1935)
- The King's Prisoner (1935)
- Lessons in Love (1935)
- City of Anatol (1936)
- The Girl Irene (1936)
- The Bashful Casanova (1936)
- The Hound of the Baskervilles (1937)
- Dangerous Game (1937)
- The Unexcused Hour (1937)
- His Best Friend (1937)
- Anton the Last (1939)
- New Year's Eve on Alexanderplatz (1939)
- Robert Koch (1939)
- Judgement Day (1940)
- Love is Duty Free (1941)
- Beloved Darling (1943)
- Mask in Blue (1943)
- Why Are You Lying, Elisabeth? (1944)
- Nothing But Coincidence (1949)
- The Cuckoos (1949)
- Two Times Lotte (1950)
- Royal Children (1950)
- Kissing Is No Sin (1950)
- Doctor Praetorius (1950)
- Sensation in San Remo (1951)
- The Lady in Black (1951)
- Nights on the Road (1952)
- The Imaginary Invalid (1952)
- The Devil Makes Three (1953)
