= The Roberts Case =

1933 film

- Directed by: Erich Engels
- Written by: Arnold Lippschitz
- Starring: Hermann Speelmans; Camilla Spira; Eduard von Winterstein
- Cinematography: Karl Hasselmann
- Music by: Heinz Letton
- Production company: Märkische Film
- Distributed by: Märkische Film
- Release date: 4 May 1933
- Running time: 94 minutes
- Country: Germany
- Language: German

The Roberts Case (German: Der Fall Roberts or Die Nacht im Forsthaus) is a 1933 German drama film directed by Erich Engels and starring Hermann Speelmans, Camilla Spira and Eduard von Winterstein. It was shot at the Johannisthal Studios in Berlin.

== Cast ==
- Hermann Speelmans as Walther Hartwig, Förster
- Camilla Spira as Maria, seine Frau
- Eduard von Winterstein as Bergmann, Bürgermeister
- Paul Henckels as Heßling, Apotheker
- Eugen Rex as Dennert, Kaufmann
- Kurt Lilien as Zwiebel, Amtsdiener
- Julius Falkenstein as Kümmelmann, Schmierendirektor
- Hans Adalbert Schlettow as Reimann, Kriminalkommissär
- Fritz Spira
- Dorothea Thiess as Frau Bergmann
- Ruth Jacobsen
- Ruth Kuthan
- F.W. Schröder-Schrom as Roberts, Bauunternehmer
- Karl Harbacher
- Reinhold Bernt
- Ernst Behmer

== Bibliography ==
- Moeller, Felix; Schlöndorff, Volker (2000). The Film Minister: Goebbels and the Cinema in the Third Reich. Axel Menges. ISBN 978-3-932565-10-6.
