= How Do I Become Rich and Happy? =

1930 film by Max Reichmann

- Directed by: Max Reichmann
- Written by: Felix Jackson (play); Walter Reisch
- Starring: Georgia Lind; Hugo Schrader; Ilse Korseck
- Cinematography: Reimar Kuntze
- Edited by: Geza Pollatschik
- Music by: Mischa Spoliansky
- Production company: Münchner Lichtspielkunst
- Distributed by: Bavaria Film
- Release date: 30 September 1930
- Country: Germany
- Language: German

How Do I Become Rich and Happy? (German: Wie werde ich reich und glücklich?) is a 1930 German musical film directed by Max Reichmann and starring Georgia Lind, Hugo Schrader, and Ilse Korseck. It was made by Bavaria Film at the Emelka Studios near Munich. The film's art direction was by Hans Jacoby.

== Cast ==
- Georgia Lind as Lis, ein Mädel
- Hugo Schrader as Kibis, ein junger Mann
- Ilse Korseck as Mary, seine Tochter
- Paul Hörbiger as Geheimrat Regen
- Willy Stettner as F. D. Lohrenz
- Karl Platen

== Bibliography ==
- Bock, Hans-Michael; Bergfelder, Tim, eds. (2009). The Concise Cinegraph: Encyclopaedia of German Cinema. New York: Berghahn Books. ISBN 978-1-57181-655-9.
