= Rudolf Perak =

Austrian composer

- Born: 29 March 1891; Vienna, Austro-Hungarian Empire
- Died: 3 December 1972 (aged 81); Munich, Bavaria, West Germany
- Occupation: Conposer
- Years active: 1933-1970 (film)

Rudolf Perak (1891–1972) was an Austrian composer of film scores who worked mainly in Germany. He wrote the scores for many documentaries during his career, including a film directed by Leni Riefenstahl.

== Selected filmography ==
- Wedding at Lake Wolfgang (1933)
- Stronger Than Regulations (1936)
- Stjenka Rasin (1936)
- Signal in the Night (1937)
- Twelve Minutes After Midnight (1939)
- Melody of a Great City (1943)
- Oh, You Dear Fridolin (1952)
- Bis fünf nach zwölf – Adolf Hitler und das 3. Reich (1953)

== Bibliography ==
- Rother, Rainer & Bott, Martin H. Leni Riefenstahl: The Seduction of Genius.Continuum International Publishing 2003.
