= Edith Meller =

German actress

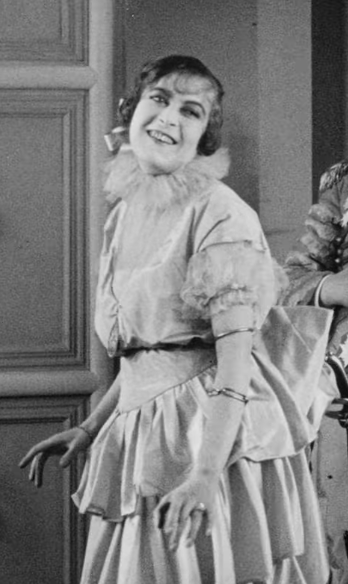
- As Lilli in Die Bergkatze (1921)
- Born: Edith Karolina Meller; 16 September 1897; Budapest, Austria-Hungary
- Died: 18 October 1953 (aged 56); Berlin, Germany
- Occupation: Actress

Edith Karolina Meller (16 September 1897 – 18 October 1953) was a Hungarian-born actress who primarily worked in German silent cinema. Born in Budapest, Hungary, she made a name for herself in the film industry during the 1920s.

== Early life ==
Edith was the daughter of Eugénia Amália Klug and Lajos Meller, a mill owner. She spent her childhood in Pressbaum near Vienna and studied acting in the imperial capital. Her entry into the film industry was facilitated by the wife of Leopold von Berchtold, the Austro-Hungarian foreign minister, who helped her secure a role in the 1916 silent film Bogdan Stimoff.

== Career ==
For her debut in Bogdan Stimoff, Meller used the name Edith Möller. This film, a Bulgarian patriotic drama set across multiple locations including Sofia, New York City, Berlin, Vienna, and Budapest, marked the beginning of her career in German silent cinema.

Following her debut, Meller appeared in nearly 50 German-made silent films up to the end of the 1920s. She frequently worked with director Georg Jacoby, whom she later married on April 20, 1922. Their collaboration resulted in several films, including patriotic works such as Die Entdeckung Deutschlands (1916) and Der feldgraue Groschen (1917).

Meller's career peaked in 1921–1922. During this period, she starred in notable productions such as Der Mann ohne Namen (1921), a 6-part thriller series directed by Jacoby, and Die Bergkatze (The Wild Cat, 1921), directed by Ernst Lubitsch, where she starred alongside Pola Negri.

She was also a regular leading actress in adaptations of E. Marlitt's novels produced by National-Film. However, her marriage to Jacoby ended in divorce on April 18, 1930. This personal change coincided with the decline of her film career, which was further impacted by the rise of sound films.

== Filmography ==
- 1916: Bogdan Stimoff
- 1916: Benjamin, der Schüchterne
- 1916: Die Entdeckung Deutschlands
- 1917: Die wilde Ursula
- 1917: Der feldgraue Groschen
- 1917: Der Antiquar von Straßburg
- 1918: Weißes Gold
- 1918: Das Heideprinzeßchen
- 1919: Ich lasse dich nicht
- 1920: Va banque
- 1920: Die Frau ohne Seele
- 1920: Indische Rache
- 1921: Die Geschichte des grauen Hauses 1. Teil Der Mord aus verschmähter Liebe
- 1921: Der Mann ohne Namen
- 1921: Die Bergkatze
- 1921: Das Geheimnis der Santa Maria
- 1921: Der Graf, die Tänzerin und der Staatsanwalt
- 1922: Die Lüge eines Sommers
- 1922: Wenn die Maske fällt
- 1922: Die Schneiderkomteß
- 1922: Der bekannte Unbekannte
- 1922: Der Abenteurer
- 1923: Das Paradies im Schnee
- 1924: Komödianten des Lebens
- 1925: Husarenfieber
- 1929: Wir halten fest und treu zusammen
- 1929: Meineid
