= Quick (1932 film) =

1932 film

- Directed by: Robert Siodmak
- Written by: Félix Gandéra (play); Hans Müller
- Produced by: Erich Pommer
- Starring: Lilian Harvey; Hans Albers
- Cinematography: Otto Baecker; Günther Rittau
- Edited by: Viktor Gertler
- Music by: Hans-Otto Borgmann; Werner R. Heymann; Gérard Jacobson
- Production company: UFA
- Distributed by: UFA
- Release date: 8 August 1932
- Running time: 97 minutes
- Country: Germany
- Language: German

Quick is a 1932 German comedy film directed by Robert Siodmak and starring Lilian Harvey, Hans Albers and Paul Hörbiger. A separate French-language version was made, also directed by Siodmak and starring Harvey. The film is based on a play by Félix Gandéra. It was made by Germany's largest company UFA at the Babelsberg Studios, with sets by art director Erich Kettelhut. It premiered at the Ufa-Palast am Zoo.

== Plot ==
A woman staying at a health spa goes to the theater every night to see "Quick", a comic performer wearing clown make-up. She meets him off stage, without make-up, and doesn't recognize him. He courts her, hoping she'll like him for himself, but she maintains her crush on "Quick."

== Cast ==
- Lilian Harvey as Eva Prätorius
- Hans Albers as Quick, Music Clown
- Paul Hörbiger as Lademann, Quick's manager
- Willy Stettner as Herr von Pohl, named Dicky
- Albert Kersten as Professor Bertram
- Karl Meinhardt as Direktor Henkel
- Paul Westermeier as Clock
- Genia Nikolaieva as Marion, dancer
- Käthe Haack as Frau Koch
- Flockina von Platen as Charlotte
- Fritz Odemar as Headwaiter

== Bibliography ==
- Hardt, Ursula (1996). From Caligari to California: Erich Pommer's Life in the International Film Wars. Berghahn Books. ISBN 978-1-57181-930-7.
