= Bis fünf nach zwölf – Adolf Hitler und das 3. Reich =

1953 film

Bis fünf nach zwölf - Adolf Hitler und das 3. Reich
- Directed by: Gerhard Grindel
- Written by: Gerhard Grindel (writer)
- Produced by: Wolf C. Hartwig (producer)
- Starring: See below
- Edited by: Bert Rudolf
- Music by: Rudolf Perak
- Release date: 1953
- Country: West Germany
- Language: German

Bis fünf nach zwölf – Adolf Hitler und das 3. Reich (English: Until five past twelve - Adolf Hitler and the Third Reich) is a 1953 West German documentary film directed by Gerhard Grindel.

The film is also known as Adolf Hitler - Ein Volk, ein Reich, ein Führer: Dokumente der Zeitgeschichte (Adolf Hitler - One people, one empire, one leader) in West Germany, Adolf Hitler und das 3. Reich - Sein Untergang (Adolf Hitler and the Third Reich - Its downfall (German DVD box title)) and Bis 5 nach 12 (German DVD title).

== Plot summary ==
The film begins with the First World War and ends in 1945. The footage used was exclusively from this period, taken from newsreels from various countries. Previously unpublished scenes about the private lives of Adolf Hitler and Eva Braun were also shown for the first time. The film was originally built into a framework story.

== Cast ==
- Martin Bormann as Himself (archive footage)
- Eva Braun as Herself (archive footage)
- Winston Churchill as Himself (archive footage)
- Karl Dönitz as Himself (archive footage)
- Hans Frank as Himself (archive footage)
- Roland Freisler as Himself (archive footage)
- Wilhelm Frick as Himself (archive footage)
- Hans Fritzsche as Himself (archive footage)
- Walther Funk as Himself (archive footage)
- Joseph Goebbels as Himself (archive footage)
- Carl Friedrich Goerdeler as Himself (archive footage)
- Hermann Göring as Himself (archive footage)
- Rudolf Hess as Himself (archive footage)
- Reinhard Heydrich as Himself (archive footage)
- Heinrich Himmler as Himself (archive footage)
- Adolf Hitler as Himself (archive footage)
- Miklós Horthy as Himself (archive footage)
- Friedrich Hossbach as Himself (archive footage)
- Carola Höhn as Herself
- Alfred Jodl as Himself (archive footage)
- Kaiser Wilhelm II as Himself (archive footage)
- Ernst Kaltenbrunner as Himself (archive footage)
- Wilhelm Keitel as Himself (archive footage)
- Fritz Lafontaine as Himself
- Theodor Morell as Himself (archive footage)
- Benito Mussolini as Himself (archive footage)
- Werner Mölders as Himself (archive footage)
- Friedrich Paulus as Himself (archive footage)
- Erich Raeder as Himself (archive footage)
- Walther Rathenau as Himself (archive footage)
- Otto Ernst Remer as Himself (archive footage)
- Alfred Rosenberg as Himself (archive footage)
- Ernst Röhm as Himself (archive footage)
- Fritz Sauckel as Himself (archive footage)
- Hjalmar Schacht as Himself (archive footage)
- Ferdinand Schörner as Himself (archive footage)
- Arthur Seyss-Inquart as Himself (archive footage)
- Albert Speer as Himself (archive footage)
- Joseph Stalin as Himself (archive footage)
- Julius Streicher as Himself (archive footage)
- Gustav Stresemann as Himself (archive footage)
- Harry S. Truman as Himself (archive footage)
- Tsar Nicholas II as Himself (archive footage)
- Ulrich von Hassel as Himself (archive footage)
- Paul von Hindenburg as Himself (archive footage)
- Ewald von Kleist as Himself (archive footage)
- Konstantin von Neurath as Himself (archive footage)
- Franz von Papen as Himself (archive footage)
- Joachim von Ribbentrop as Himself (archive footage)
- Gerd von Rundstedt as Himself (archive footage)
- Baldur von Schirach as Himself (archive footage)
- Erwin von Witzleben as Himself (archive footage)
- Georgi Zhukov as Himself
