= Hugo Schrader =

German actor (1902–1993)

- Born: Hugo Friedrich Schrader; 26 July 1902; Frankfurt am Main; Germany
- Died: February 22, 1993 (aged 90); Berlin; Germany
- Occupation: Film actor
- Years active: 1930–1983

Hugo Friedrich Schrader (26 July 1902 – 22 February 1993) was a German television and film actor.

== Selected filmography ==
- How Do I Become Rich and Happy? (1930)
- The Champion Shot (1932)
- Wedding at Lake Wolfgang (1933)
- A Girl Whirls By the World (1934)
- The Royal Waltz (1935)
- Until Money Departs You (1960)
- Frontier Hellcat (1964)

=== Television appearances ===
- Drei Damen vom Grill
- Jeder stirbt für sich allein (1962)
