= Hermann Speelmans =

German actor (1906-1960)

- Born: 14 August 1906; Uerdingen, German Empire
- Died: 9 February 1960 (aged 53); West Berlin, West Germany
- Other name: Hermann Maria Louise Speelmans
- Occupation: Actor
- Years active: 1929–1959 (film)

Hermann Speelmans (14 August 1906 – 9 February 1960) was a German stage and film actor.

== Selected filmography ==
- Her Dark Secret (1929) - Emil
- Diana (1930)
- There Is a Woman Who Never Forgets You (1930)
- Danton (1931) - Legendre
- The Man in Search of His Murderer (1931) - Jim
- Inquest (1931) - Bruno Klatte, Artist
- Kinder vor Gericht (1931) - August Schulze, Vater
- Checkmate (1931) - Markutius, pensionierter Kriminalbeamter
- No More Love (1931) - Tom
- The Battle of Bademunde (1931) - Hannes
- Der Herr Finanzdirektor (1931) - Albert Boudaine
- The Captain from Köpenick (1931) - Wachtmeister Killian
- At Your Orders, Sergeant (1932)
- Night Convoy (1932) - Banjospieler
- Under False Flag (1932) - Kriminalkommissar Schulz
- Crime Reporter Holm (1932)
- A Shot at Dawn (1932) - Schmitter
- Spoiling the Game (1932) - Erwin Banz - Rennfahrer
- F.P.1 (1932) - Chefingenieur Damsky
- A Door Opens (1933) - Hans Braumüller
- The Roberts Case (1933) - Walther Hartwig, Förster
- A Certain Mr. Gran (1933) - Nica
- Hitlerjunge Quex (1933) - Stoppel
- Young Dessau's Great Love (1933) - Greschke, Sergeant
- The Four Musketeers (1934) - Gefreiter Eberle
- A Man Wants to Get to Germany (1934) - Brack, his sidekick
- Herr Kobin geht auf Abenteuer (1934) - Lutz Kobin
- Holiday From Myself (1934) - Georges B. Steffenson, amerik. Großindustrieller
- Ein ganzer Kerl (1935) - Karl Grosse
- Die Werft zum Grauen Hecht (1935) - Otto Menzel
- Verlieb Dich nicht am Bodensee (1935) - Paul Rohr - Musiker
- The Last Four on Santa Cruz (1936) - Kapitän Pieter Streuvels
- Du kannst nicht treu sein (1936) - Max Hölterlin
- A Strange Guest (1936) - Hausdiener Gaston
- Back in the Country (1936) - Ramacker
- The Man Who Was Sherlock Holmes (1937) - Jimmy Ward (Sherlock Holmes)
- Autobus S (1937) - Jonny Sülken
- Schüsse in Kabine 7 (1938) - Dick Timperley
- Musketier Meier III (1938) - Anton Bahlmann
- Man for Man (1939) - Peter Klune
- Who's Kissing Madeleine? (1939) - Maurice Duroi
- Alarm at Station III (1939) - Ströhm, Zollpolizist
- Congo Express (1939) - Chagrin
- Counterfeiters (1940) - Karl Bergmann aka Harry Gernreich
- Unser kleiner Junge (1941) - Ole Thomsen
- Goodbye, Franziska (1941) - Buck Standing
- Familienanschluß (1941) - Kapitän Peter Bräuer
- Vom Schicksal verweht (1942) - Will Rubber Journalist
- Drei tolle Mädels (1942) - Von Randolf
- Münchhausen (1943) - Christian Kuchenreutter
- Meine vier Jungens (1944) - Klaus Christiansen
- Wir sehn uns wieder (1945) - Jupp Mewes - Pionier
- Der Scheiterhaufen (1947) - Gutsbesitzer Schönborn
- In Those Days (1947) - August Hintze / 5. Geschichte
- In the Temple of Venus (1948) - Kai Brodersen
- Vor uns liegt das Leben (1948) - Kapitän Harms
- Search for Majora (1949) - Will Blom
- Poison in the Zoo (1952) - Kriminalrat Walter Glasbrenner
- Shooting Stars (1952) - Arthur Wernicke
- Komm zurück... (1953) - (uncredited)
- A Heart Plays False (1953) - Matz
- Verrat an Deutschland (1955) - Max Klausen
- Bandits of the Autobahn (1955) - Hauptwachtmeister Lüdecke
- Hanussen (1955) - Maus
- Parole Heimat (1955) - Willi
- Ballerina (1956) - Kalborn
- Das Mädchen Marion (1956) - Kalweit, Bereiter
- Von der Liebe besiegt (1956) - Hermann Egli
- Liebe, Luft und lauter Lügen (1959) - Käptn Seemann (final film role)

== Bibliography ==
- Capua, Michelangelo (2015). Anatole Litvak: The Life and Films. Jefferson, NC: McFarland. ISBN 978-1-4766-1870-8.
