= Franz Wenzler =

German film director

- Born: 26 April 1893; Braunschweig, Duchy of Brunswick, German Empire
- Died: 9 January 1942 (aged 48); Rome, Lazio, Italy
- Occupation: Director
- Years active: 1931–1935 (film)

Franz Wenzler (26 April 1893 – 9 January 1942) was a German film director.

== Selected filmography ==
- The Scoundrel (1931)
- The Night Without Pause (1931)
- Marriage with Limited Liability (1931)
- When Love Sets the Fashion (1932)
- The Importance of Being Earnest (1932)
- Scandal on Park Street (1932)
- The Peak Scaler (1933)
- Hundred Days (1935)
- Streak of Steel (1935)

== Bibliography ==
- Weniger, Kay. ‘Es wird im Leben dir mehr genommen als gegeben …’. Lexikon der aus Deutschland und Österreich emigrierten Filmschaffenden 1933 bis 1945. Eine Gesamtübersicht. ACABUS-Verlag, Hamburg 2011, ISBN 978-3-86282-049-8, p. 656
- Grange, William. Cultural Chronicle of the Weimar Republic. Scarecrow Press, 2008.
