= Two Hearts Beat as One (film) =

1932 film

- Directed by: Wilhelm Thiele
- Written by: André Birabeau (play); Georges Dolley (play); Franz Schulz
- Produced by: Erich Pommer
- Starring: Lilian Harvey; Wolf Albach-Retty; Kurt Lilien; Tibor Halmay
- Cinematography: Carl Hoffmann
- Edited by: Eduard von Borsody
- Music by: Jean Gilbert
- Production company: UFA
- Distributed by: UFA
- Release date: 19 February 1932
- Running time: 85 minutes
- Country: Germany
- Language: German

Two Hearts Beat as One (German: Zwei Herzen und ein Schlag) is a 1932 German musical film directed by Wilhelm Thiele and starring Lilian Harvey, Wolf Albach-Retty and Kurt Lilien. It was shot at the Babelsberg Studios in Berlin. The film's sets were designed by the art directors Werner Schlichting and Benno von Arent. A separate French-language version The Girl and the Boy was made, also starring Harvey.

== Cast ==
- Lilian Harvey as Jenny Müller
- Wolf Albach-Retty as Victor Müller
- Kurt Lilien as Moritz
- Tibor Halmay as Arpard von Nélemén
- Franz Rott as Ernö Békeffy
- Hermann Blaß as Advokat
- Ernst Behmer
- Hans Deppe
- Rudolf Biebrach
- Rosa Valetti
- Otto Wallburg
- Gertrud Wolle

== Bibliography ==
- Bock, Hans-Michael & Bergfelder, Tim. The Concise CineGraph. Encyclopedia of German Cinema. Berghahn Books, 2009.
