= The Importance of Being Earnest (1932 film) =

1932 film

- Directed by: Franz Wenzler
- Based on: The Importance of Being Earnest; 1895 play by Miklós László
- Starring: Charlotte Ander; Georg Alexander
- Music by: Ralph Erwin
- Production company: Nostra-Film
- Distributed by: Messtro-Film
- Release date: 10 October 1932
- Running time: 92 minutes
- Country: Germany
- Language: German

The Importance of Being Earnest (German: Liebe, Scherz und Ernst) is a 1932 German comedy film directed by Franz Wenzler and starring Charlotte Ander and Georg Alexander. It was shot at the Johannisthal Studios in Berlin. It is an adaptation of Oscar Wilde's 1895 play The Importance of Being Earnest.

== Cast ==
- Charlotte Ander.
- Georg Alexander as Ernst.
- Harald Paulsen.
- Adele Sandrock.
- Ilse Korseck.
- Gertrud Wolle.
- Julius Falkenstein.
- Erich Kestin.
- Hilde Hildebrand.
- Kurt Lilien.
- Gerhard Dammann.
- Gustav Püttjer.
- Emmy Wyda.

== Bibliography ==
- Klaus, Ulrich J. Deutsche Tonfilme: Jahrgang 1932. Klaus-Archiv, 1988. ISBN 978-3-927352-07-0.
- Tanitch, Robert (1999). Oscar Wilde on Stage and Screen. Methuen. ISBN 978-0-413-72610-0.
