= Scandal on Park Street =

1932 film

- Directed by: Franz Wenzler
- Written by: Bobby E. Lüthge; Károly Nóti
- Produced by: Julius Haimann
- Starring: Camilla Spira; Fritz Kampers; Kurt Lilien
- Music by: Walter Jurmann; Bronislau Kaper
- Production company: Kreis-Film
- Distributed by: Vereinigte Star-Film
- Release date: 26 March 1932
- Running time: 80 minutes
- Country: Germany
- Language: German

Scandal on Park Street (German: Skandal in der Parkstraße) is a 1932 German film directed by Franz Wenzler and starring Camilla Spira, Fritz Kampers, and Kurt Lilien. It was shot at the Johannisthal Studios in Berlin. The film's sets were designed by the art director Ernő Metzner.

== Cast ==
- Camilla Spira
- Fritz Kampers
- Kurt Lilien
- Dorothea Thiess
- Trude Brionne
- Senta Söneland
- Genia Nikolaieva
- Kurt Vespermann
- Leo Slezak
- Sophie Pagay
- Ilse Korseck
- Hans Wassmann
- Rosa Valetti
- Wilhelm Diegelmann
- Fritz Odemar
- Paul Rehkopf
- Gustav Püttjer
- Truda Grosslichtová

== Bibliography ==
- Grange, William (2008). Cultural Chronicle of the Weimar Republic. Lanham, MD: Scarecrow Press. ISBN 978-0-8108-5967-8.
- Klaus, Ulrich J. Deutsche Tonfilme: Jahrgang 1932. Klaus-Archiv, 1988.
