= Marriageable Daughters =

1933 film

- Directed by: Sigurd Wallén
- Written by: Sigurd Wallén
- Produced by: Stellan Claësson
- Starring: Karin Swanström; Birgit Tengroth; Maritta Marke; Karin Ekelund
- Cinematography: Julius Jaenzon
- Edited by: Rolf Husberg
- Music by: Jules Sylvain
- Production company: Svensk Filmindustri
- Distributed by: Svensk Filmindustri
- Release date: 10 April 1933
- Running time: 89 minutes
- Country: Sweden
- Language: Swedish

Marriageable Daughters (Swedish: Giftasvuxna döttrar) is a 1933 Swedish comedy film directed by Sigurd Wallén and starring Karin Swanström, Birgit Tengroth, Maritta Marke and Karin Ekelund. It was shot at the Råsunda Studios in Stockholm. The film's sets were designed by the art director Arne Åkermark. It is a remake of the 1925 German silent film Three Waiting Maids.

== Synopsis ==
A maidservant takes an interest in the love lives of her three daughters who each in turn get married.

== Cast ==
- Karin Swanström as Emma Lundberg
- Birgit Tengroth as Lotta
- Maritta Marke as Lina
- Karin Ekelund as Lena
- Sture Lagerwall as Robban
- Sigurd Wallén as Fritz Lande
- Einar Axelsson as Erik Ehrenberg
- Nils Jacobsson as Franz Hallberg
- Wiktor Andersson as Uncle Fredrik
- Tor Borong as Door-man
- Helga Brofeldt as Mrs. Bergstroem
- Sigge Fürst as Dancing guest at restaurant

== Bibliography ==
- Qvist, Per Olov & von Bagh, Peter. Guide to the Cinema of Sweden and Finland. Greenwood Publishing Group, 2000.
