= Dorothea Thiess =

German actress

- Born: 17 May 1897; German Empire
- Died: 1973 (aged 75–76)
- Occupation: Actress
- Years active: 1932–1971 (film & TV)

Dorothea Thiess (1897–1973) was a German stage, film and television actress.

== Selected filmography ==
- Sacred Waters (1932)
- Two Lucky Days (1932)
- Scandal on Park Street (1932)
- Anna and Elizabeth (1933)
- The Roberts Case (1933)
- The Red Rider (1935)
- The Girl from the Marsh Croft (1935)
- Uncle Bräsig (1936)
- Moscow-Shanghai (1936)
- The Chief Witness (1937)
- The Beaver Coat (1937)
- What Now, Sibylle? (1938)
- Her First Experience (1939)
- Summer Nights (1944)

== Bibliography ==
- Welch, David. Propaganda and the German Cinema, 1933-1945. I.B.Tauris, 2001.
