= Werner Fuetterer =

German actor (1907–1991)

Werner Fuetterer (10 January 1907 in Barth, Mecklenburg-Vorpommern – 7 February 1991 in Benidorm, Province of Alicante, Spain) was a German film actor. He appeared in nearly 100 films between 1925 and 1967.

In his early film career, Fuetterer often played young romantic lovers, but never managed the breakthrough to stardom. He later turned to character and supporting roles, often as the main characters best friend. Fuetterer remains perhaps best known for his role as the Archangel in F. W. Murnau's silent film classic Faust (1926). He later retired from acting and managed a camping facility in Spain, where he died in 1991 at age 84.

== Selected filmography ==
- The Flying Dutchman (1925) - Sven
- The Brothers Schellenberg (1926) - Georg Weidenbach
- The Wiskottens (1926) - Ewald - der 'Maler', Sohn
- I Lost My Heart in Heidelberg (1926) - Rudolf - sein Sohn
- Kubinke the Barber (1926) - Kubinke, der Barbier
- Faust (1926) - Erzengel / Archangel
- Uneasy Money (1926) - Andreas, Annas Freund und Nachbar
- Chaste Susanne (1926) - Hubert
- A Sister of Six (1926) - Geza
- Out of the Mist (1927) - Robert Hellmich
- Durchlaucht Radieschen (1927) - Graf Casimir Conjak
- Ich war zu Heidelberg Student (1927)
- Queen of the Boulevards (1927) - Lucien
- Grand Hotel (1927)
- The Prince of Pappenheim (1927) - Sascha, Prinz von Gorgonien
- The Woman from Till 12 (1928) - Freddie Werder - Young Man
- Only a Viennese Woman Kisses Like That (1928) - Der Anton
- Artists (1928) - Fred Milson
- The Love Commandment (1928) - Raul Warburg
- Single Mother (1928)
- At Ruedesheimer Castle There Is a Lime Tree (1928) - Fritz von Hohenstein
- The Girl from the Revue (1928) - Graf Axel Holm, Attaché
- The Weekend Bride (1928) - Hans
- The Most Beautiful Woman in Paris (1928)
- The Weekend Bride (1928) - Dr. Schwarzecker
- The Crazy Countess (1928) - Graf Walter von Hagenau, sein Neffe
- L'évadée (1929) - John Fitzbury
- Dawn (1929) - Stephan, sein Sohn
- Storm of Love (1929) - Jonel
- The Girl with the Whip (1929) - Edgar Krell
- Im Prater blühen wieder die Bäume (1929) - Mucki von Rehlen
- Never Trust a Woman (1930) - Peter
- You'll Be in My Heart (1930) - Marquis Duverge
- Wiener Herzen (1930)
- Pasák holek (1930) - Jarda Duschnitz
- The Rhineland Girl (1930) - Hans Waldorf
- Oh Those Glorious Old Student Days (1930) - Student Robert Riedel
- Once I Loved a Girl in Vienna (1931) - Franz von Wergenthin
- Die Frau - Die Nachtigall (1931) - Algeri Tiejten
- Marriage with Limited Liability (1931) - Georg Kaiser I.
- The Four from Bob 13 (1932) - Treß
- Cruiser Emden (1932) - Petzold
- The Cruel Mistress (1932) - Jim Bock
- Night of Temptation (1932)
- Daughter of the Regiment (1933) - Lord Robert
- Heimat am Rhein (1933) - Hannes Lorenz
- His Majesty's Adjutant (1934) - Prinz Eugen
- Just Once a Great Lady (1934) - Wolf von Wolfenstein
- Achtung! Wer kennt diese Frau? (1934) - Walter von Molnar, Forstassistent
- What Am I Without You (1934) - Himself
- The Model Husband (1937) - Fred Evans
- Target in the Clouds (1939) - Dieter von Kamphausen
- Central Rio (1939) - Michael Wenk
- Der singende Tor (1939) - Antonio
- Casa lontana (1939) - James Kennedy
- A Man Astray (1940) - Nils Nilsen
- Heimkehr (1941) - Oskar Friml
- The Old Boss (1942) - Konrad von Schulte
- I Entrust My Wife to You (1943) - Robert
- Fritze Bollmann wollte angeln (1943) - Johannes Gottlieb Blank
- Light of Heart (1943) - Karl Schwertfeger
- Harald Arrives at Nine (1944) - Harald Heimendahl
- The Years Pass (1945) - Wilhelm Kersten, dessen Sohn
- Journey to Happiness (1948) - Richard Jürgens
- Beloved Liar (1950) - Dr. Gößler
- Das seltsame Leben des Herrn Bruggs (1951) - Dr. Fiedler - Sekretär
- Miracles Still Happen (1951) - Felix Schön
- Decision Before Dawn (1951) - von Bülow (uncredited)
- That Can Happen to Anyone (1952) - Paul Süsskind
- Until We Meet Again (1952) - Bernard - Modesalonbesitzer
- Holiday From Myself (1952) - Stone, Stefensons Privatsekretär
- The Chaplain of San Lorenzo (1953) - Dr. Matheson
- Salto Mortale (1953)
- Not Afraid of Big Animals (1953) - Bollmann
- Secretly Still and Quiet (1953) - Conradi
- Christina (1953) - Direktor Werner Holk
- The Private Secretary (1953) - Ostermann
- My Sister and I (1954) - Graf Kollinoff
- Ten on Every Finger (1954) - Gregor Bruchsal
- Secrets of the City (1955) - Dr. Gunther
- Des Teufels General (1955) - Baron von Pflunck
- Ein Mann vergißt die Liebe (1955)
- I Know What I'm Living For (1955) - Dr. Schneider, RA.
- The Inn on the Lahn (1955) - Herr Sonnenschein
- Love, Dance and a Thousand Songs (1955) - Heidemann
- In Hamburg When the Nights Are Long (1956)
- Du bist Musik (1956) - Gesandter
- Siebenmal in der Woche (1957) - Kruttke
- Träume von der Südsee (1957) - Hjalmar Nielsen
- Heimatlos (1958) - Hanuschke
- Nick Knatterton’s Adventure (1959) - Redakteur
- Frau im besten Mannesalter (1959) - Karsten, Rechtsanwalt
- La Paloma (1959) - Stefan Holden
- A Thousand Stars Aglitter (1959) - Radioreporter
- Ein Student ging vorbei (1960) - Graf Hohenpersch
- Sweetheart of the Gods (1960) - Harry de Cassian
- I Learned That in Paris (1960) - Hubert Wüstenhagen
- Mister Dynamit - Morgen küßt euch der Tod (1967) - General Probst (final film role)

== Bibliography ==
- Hardt, Ursula. From Caligari to California: Erich Pommer's Life in the International Film Wars. Berghahn Books, 1996.
