= The Pride of Company Three =

1932 film

- Directed by: Fred Sauer
- Written by: Friedrich Raff
- Starring: Heinz Rühmann; Anton Walbrook; Eugen Burg; Viktor de Kowa
- Cinematography: Friedl Behn-Grund
- Edited by: Fred Sauer
- Music by: Hans May
- Production company: Deutsche Lichtspiel-Syndikat
- Distributed by: Deutsche Lichtspiel-Syndikat
- Release date: 4 January 1932
- Running time: 85 minutes
- Country: Germany
- Language: German

The Pride of Company Three (German: Der Stolz der 3. Kompanie) is a 1932 German comedy film directed by Fred Sauer and starring Heinz Rühmann, Anton Walbrook and Eugen Burg. It premiered on 4 January 1932. It was shot at the Staaken Studios in Berlin. The film's sets were designed by the art directors Robert Neppach and Erwin Scharf.

== Synopsis ==
The film is set in pre-1914 Germany. It follows the tangled love lives of a group of soldiers at a military barracks.

== Cast ==
- Heinz Rühmann as Gustav Diestelbeck
- Anton Walbrook as Prinz Willibald
- Eugen Burg as Minister v. Schwarzenbecher
- Ferdinand von Alten as Martini, Lakai
- Josef Peterhans as Kommandierender General
- Walter Steinbeck as Major Schering
- Viktor de Kowa as Leutnant Fritz Gernsbach
- Fritz Kampers as Feldwebel Krause
- Gerhard Bienert as Sergeant Schmidt
- Rudolf Platte as Unteroffizier Knoll
- Heinz Förster-Ludwig as Musketier Lange
- Herbert Nußbaum as Musketier Baum
- Paul Henckels as Weinbauer Diestelbeck
- Arthur Mainzer as Hotelier
- Trude Berliner as Vera, Stimmungssängerin
- Ilse Korseck as Gertrude
- Christl Mardayn as Emma Wacker

== Bibliography ==
- Grange, William. Cultural Chronicle of the Weimar Republic. Scarecrow Press, 2008.
