= Cavaliers of the Kurfürstendamm =

1932 film

- Directed by: Romano Mengon
- Written by: Hans Fritz Köllner; Walter Lesch
- Produced by: Romano Mengon
- Starring: Olaf Fjord; Friedl Haerlin; Harry Frank
- Cinematography: Georg Krause; Edgar S. Ziesemer
- Edited by: Conrad von Molo
- Music by: Werner Schmidt-Boelcke
- Production company: Mengon Film
- Distributed by: Süd-Film
- Release date: 10 June 1932
- Running time: 83 minutes
- Country: Germany
- Language: German

Cavaliers of the Kurfürstendamm (German: Kavaliere vom Kurfürstendamm) is a 1932 German comedy film directed by Romano Mengon and starring Olaf Fjord, Friedl Haerlin and Harry Frank. It was shot at the Johannisthal Studios in Berlin and on location around the city. The film's sets were designed by the art director Heinrich Richter. It takes place amongst some lovers of the good life who frequent the Kurfürstendamm, the fashionable boulevard in the German capital. Mengon didn't make another film until Road to Home in 1952.

== Cast ==
- Olaf Fjord as André Carlson
- Friedl Haerlin as Elena, seine Frau
- Harry Frank as Georg Landner
- Paul Otto as Dannhoff
- Hilde Boenisch as Ilse, seine Tochter
- Emmy Wyda as Frau Kraschinsky
- Heinrich Heilinger as Plüschke - Besitzer der Bar
- Ali Ghito as Eine Dame
- Angelo Ferrari as von Poponowksy
- Erik Ode as Niske
- Reinhold Bernt as Gorritz
- Albert von Kersten as Dr. Berg, Kommissär
- Friedrich Ettel as Werner, 2. Kommisär

== Bibliography ==
- Bock, Hans-Michael & Bergfelder, Tim. The Concise CineGraph. Encyclopedia of German Cinema. Berghahn Books, 2009.
- Klaus, Ulrich J. Deutsche Tonfilme: Jahrgang 1932. Klaus-Archiv, 1988.
