= Death Over Shanghai =

1932 film

- Gerda Maurus
- Directed by: Rolf Randolf
- Written by: Hans Vietzke; Max Wallner
- Produced by: Walter Hoffmann
- Starring: Gerda Maurus; Else Elster; Theodor Loos
- Cinematography: Willy Hameister
- Edited by: Hildegard Grebner
- Music by: Leo Leux
- Production company: Ultra Film
- Distributed by: Siegel-Monopolfilm
- Release date: 28 October 1932
- Running time: 79 minutes
- Country: Germany
- Language: German

Death Over Shanghai (German: Tod über Shanghai) is a 1932 German thriller film directed by Rolf Randolf and starring Gerda Maurus, Else Elster and Theodor Loos. The Chinese Ministry of Education requested that the German government have the film destroyed because they had received reports that it "ridiculed China and the Chinese people".

The film's sets were designed by the art director Heinrich Richter. Location filming took place on the Halligen of the North Sea.

== Cast ==
- Gerda Maurus as Praxa, Besitzerin des Teehauses zur 'Mohnblüte'
- Else Elster as Maud - Gouverneurs Tochter
- Theodor Loos as James Biggers
- Peter Voß as John Baxter
- Max Ralph-Ostermann as Gouverneur Harris
- Robert Eckert as Mac Hover amerik. Marine-Attaché
- Ernst Pröckl as William - Biggers Sekretär
- Georg John as Lutsin - Praxas Diener
- Mammey Terja-Basa as Baxters Gehilfe
- Aruth Wartan as Corner
- Otto Kronburger as Kommandant der 'Washington'
- Fritz Alberti as Dr. Brown, Polizeichef
- Egon Kaiser as Kapellmeister & sein Orchester

== Bibliography ==
- Lu, Sheldon Hsiao-Peng (1997). Transnational Chinese Cinemas: Identity, Nationhood, Gender. University of Hawaii Press. ISBN 978-0-8248-1845-6. - Read online, registration required
