= Else Elster =

German actress (1910–1998)

- Born: 22 February 1910
- Died: 28 March 1998 (aged 88)

Else Elster (22 February 1910 – 28 March 1998) was a German actress who appeared in over forty films during the Weimar and Nazi eras.

== Selected filmography ==
- The Blonde Nightingale (1930)
- A Gentleman for Hire (1930)
- Weekend in Paradise (1931)
- Victoria and Her Hussar (1931)
- Death Over Shanghai (1932)
- Secret of the Blue Room (1932)
- Frederica (1932)
- The Escape to Nice (1932)
- The Cheeky Devil (1932)
- Mrs. Lehmann's Daughters (1932)
- Wedding at Lake Wolfgang (1933)
- When the Village Music Plays on Sunday Nights (1933)
- Must We Get Divorced? (1933)
- Trouble Backstairs (1935)
- Make Me Happy (1935)
- The Violet of Potsdamer Platz (1936)
- Three Girls for Schubert (1936)
- The Stars Shine (1938)
- The Optimist (1938)
- Hello Janine! (1939)
- The Unfaithful Eckehart (1940)
- Jud Süß (1940)
- Love is Duty Free (1941)
- Fritze Bollmann wollte angeln (1943)
- Nothing But Coincidence (1949)

== Bibliography ==
- Rentschler, Eric. The Ministry of Illusion: Nazi Cinema and Its Afterlife. Harvard University Press, 1996.
- Weaver, Tom & Brunas, Michael & Brunas, John. Universal Horrors: The Studio's Classic Films, 1931-1946. McFarland & Company, 2007.
