= Night Convoy =

1932 film directed by James Bauer

- Directed by: James Bauer
- Written by: Armin Petersen
- Produced by: James Bauer
- Starring: Vladimir Gajdarov; Olga Chekhova; Oskar Homolka; Wolfgang Lohmeyer
- Cinematography: Frederik Fuglsang
- Edited by: Herbert B. Fredersdorf
- Music by: Ernst Erich Buder
- Production company: Ines Internationale Spielfilm
- Distributed by: Omnium-Film
- Release date: 21 January 1932
- Running time: 98 minutes
- Country: Germany
- Language: German

Night Convoy (German: Nachtkolonne) is a 1932 German drama film directed by James Bauer and starring Vladimir Gajdarov, Olga Chekhova and Oskar Homolka. It was shot at the Babelsberg Studios in Berlin and on location in Hamburg. The film's sets were designed by the art directors Willi Herrmann and Herbert O. Phillips. It premiered on 21 January 1932.

== Cast ==
- Vladimir Gajdarov as Mario Orbeliani
- Olga Chekhova as Inka Maria, seine Frau
- Oskar Homolka as André Carno
- Wolfgang Lohmeyer as Jascha, deren Sohn
- Trude Berliner as Spielklarissa
- Hermann Speelmans as Banjospieler
- Julius Falkenstein as Der 'Professor'
- Käthe Haack as Frau Marquardt
- Hannele Meierzak as Christel, ihre Tochter
- Ludwig Stössel
- Hans Leibelt
- Bernhard Goetzke
- Gyula Szőreghy
- Paul Rehkopf

== Bibliography ==
- Grange, William (2008). Cultural Chronicle of the Weimar Republic. Scarecrow Press. ISBN 978-0-8108-5967-8.
- Klaus, Ulrich J. Deutsche Tonfilme: Jahrgang 1932. Klaus-Archiv, 1988.
