= When Love Sets the Fashion =

1932 film

- Directed by: Franz Wenzler
- Written by: Philipp Lothar Mayring; Fritz Zeckendorf
- Starring: Renate Müller; Hubert von Meyerinck; Georg Alexander; Gertrud Wolle
- Cinematography: Werner Brandes
- Edited by: Constantin Mick
- Music by: Hans-Otto Borgmann
- Production company: UFA
- Distributed by: UFA
- Release date: 21 December 1932
- Running time: 83 minutes
- Country: Germany
- Language: German

When Love Sets the Fashion (German: Wenn die Liebe Mode macht) is a 1932 German comedy film directed by Franz Wenzler and starring Renate Müller, Hubert von Meyerinck and Georg Alexander. It was shot at the Babelsberg Studios of UFA in Potsdam. The film's sets were designed by the art director Julius von Borsody.

== Synopsis ==
A seamstress is able to rise to become the dressmaker at a fashion house and manages to save the business by making her design ideas the latest fashion.

== Cast ==
- Renate Müller as Nelly
- Hubert von Meyerinck as Mr. Farell
- Georg Alexander as Charby
- Gertrud Wolle as Henriette
- Walter Steinbeck as Theophile
- Ilse Korseck as Agnes
- Elfriede Jera as Louise
- Maria von Tasnady as Yvonne Farell
- Otto Wallburg as Philippe Gilbert
- Kurt Vespermann as Pierre
- Hilde Hildebrand as Suzanne
- Max Ehrlich as Storage disposer
- Gisela Werbisek as Mrs. Kelerman, Budapest
- Hermann Vallentin as Ullmann Berlin
- Hermann Blaß as Mulldorfer, Wien
- Albert von Kersten as Roselli, Milano
- Midinetten as Midinetten from Paris
- Vera Witt
- Hans Behal
- Ossip Darmatow
- Alfred Durra
- Rudolf Meinhard-Jünger
- Fritz Odemar
- John Orde
- Max Ralph-Ostermann

== Bibliography ==
- Hake, Sabine. Popular Cinema of the Third Reich. University of Texas Press, 2001.
