= Two Lucky Days =

1932 film

- Directed by: Rudolf Walther-Fein
- Written by: Franz Rauch; Rudolf Walther-Fein
- Based on: Two Lucky Days by Gustaf Kadelburg and Franz von Schoenthan
- Produced by: Gabriel Levy; Walter Tost; Rudolf Walther-Fein
- Starring: Jakob Tiedtke; Claire Rommer; Ida Wüst
- Cinematography: Guido Seeber; Hugo von Kaweczynski
- Edited by: Ladislao Vajda
- Music by: Bert Reisfeld; Rolf Marbot
- Production company: Aafa Film
- Distributed by: Aafa Film
- Release date: 17 August 1932
- Running time: 75 minutes
- Country: Germany
- Language: German

Two Lucky Days (German: Zwei glückliche Tage) is a 1932 German comedy film directed by Rudolf Walther-Fein and starring Jakob Tiedtke, Claire Rommer, Ida Wüst. It was shot at the Tempelhof Studios in Berlin. The film's sets were designed by the art directors Jacek Rotmil and Emil Hasler. It is based on the 1892 play of the same title by Gustaf Kadelburg and Franz von Schoenthan, updated to the present day.

== Synopsis ==
Friedrich is delighted to be able to move out of the noisy city to an idyllic villa in the countryside with his wife Bert and daughter Else. He believes himself to be the luckiest man in the world, but his happiness is soon cut short by the fact nothing seems to work in the new property. In addition Pepi Freisinger, who he dislikes, is still courting his daughter out in the countryside. To cap it all Freisinger's father whose noisy restaurant had been one of the reasons Friedrich had left the city, announces that is building a new restaurant and amusement park right next to the villa. This is the final straw for Friedrich, who decides to sell his new property and return to the tranquillity of the city.

== Cast ==
- Jakob Tiedtke as Friedrich
- Claire Rommer as Else, seine Tochter
- Ida Wüst as Berta, seine Frau
- Paul Hörbiger as Pepi Freisinger
- Max Gülstorff as Onkel Lüttchen
- Senta Söneland as Tante Ottilie
- Oskar Sima as Herr Morawetz
- Ernst Pröckl as Vater Freisinger
- Dorothea Thiess as Frau Morawetz
- Käthe Haack as Minna, ein Dienstmädchen
- Hugo Fischer-Köppe as Hugo, ein Hausdiener
- Hermann Picha as Ein Feuerwehrmann

== Bibliography ==
- Grange, William. Cultural Chronicle of the Weimar Republic. Scarecrow Press, 2008.
- Klaus, Ulrich J. Deutsche Tonfilme: Jahrgang 1932. Klaus-Archiv, 1988.
