= Friedl Haerlin =

German actress (1901–1981)

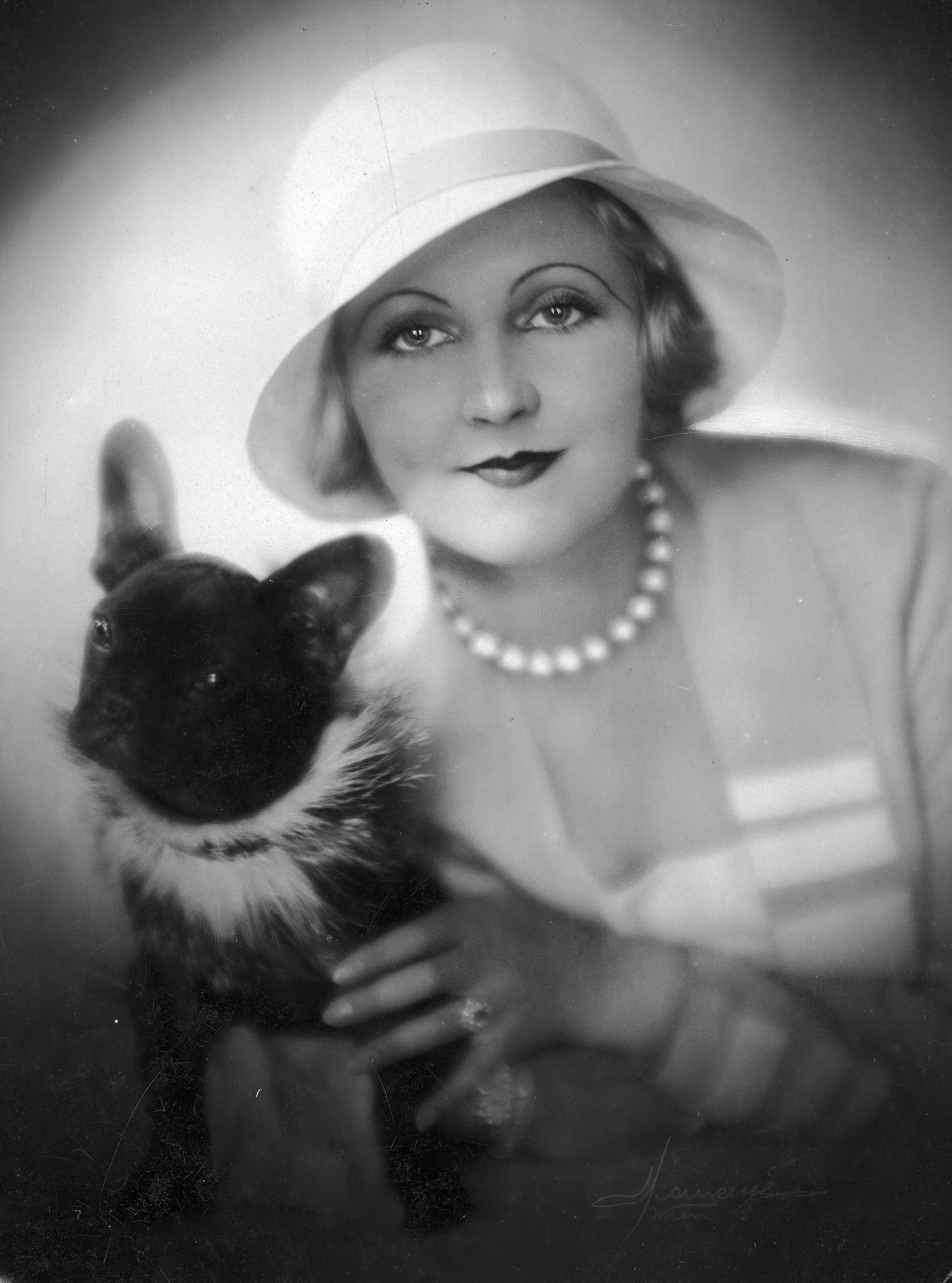
- Born: Friederike Haerlin; 29 December 1901; Gauting, Bavaria; German Empire
- Died: 17 April 1981 (aged 79); Gauting, Bavaria; West Germany
- Occupation: Actress
- Years active: 1923–1945 (film)

Friederike "Friedl" Haerlin (29 December 1901 – 17 April 1981) was a German stage and film actress.

During the 1930s she worked in cinema playing glamorous roles, mainly in comedy films. In the late 1930s, in order to boost her flagging career, she attempted to gain invitations to receptions given by Adolf Hitler. Her final film was the Austrian comedy Viennese Girls which was made in 1945, but was not released until 1949. Finding that offers of work were drying up, she later immigrated to Peru, although she returned to spend her final years in her Bavarian hometown of Gauting. Whenever she had time, Friedl Haerlin was a passionate racing driver. She set a women's record at the Semmering race in 1929.

== Selected filmography ==
- The Shot in the Pavilion (1925)
- The Stolen Face (1930)
- Queen of the Night (1931)
- The Man Who Murdered (1931)
- Cavaliers of the Kurfürstendamm (1932)
- Laughing Heirs (1933)
- A Precocious Girl (1934)
- Streak of Steel (1935)
- Hilde and the Volkswagen (1936)
- A Woman of No Importance (1936)
- Linen from Ireland (1939)
- Kora Terry (1940)
- Roses in Tyrol (1940)
- The Three Codonas (1940)
- Clarissa (1941)
- Viennese Girls (1949)

== Bibliography ==
- d' Almeida, Fabrice. High Society in the Third Reich. Polity, 2008.
