= Kurt Lilien =

German actor

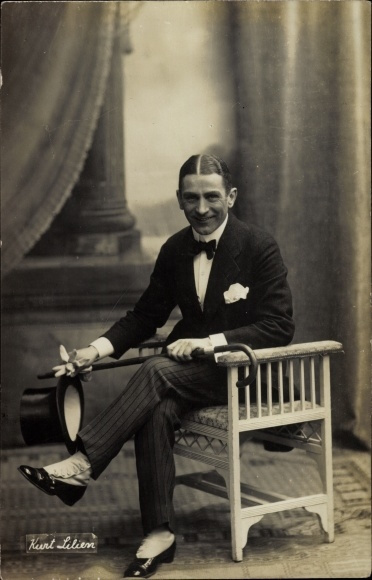
- Lilien c. 1915
- Born: Kurt Lilienthal; 6 August 1882; Berlin, Germany
- Died: 28 May 1943 (aged 60); Sobibor extermination camp, Lubelskie, Poland
- Occupation: Actor
- Years active: 1919–1933

Kurt Lilien (born Kurt Lilienthal; 6 August 1882 – 28 May 1943) was a German actor. He appeared in 50 films between 1919 and 1933. Lilien was born into a Jewish family, Lilien would be arrested and sent to Sobibor extermination camp by the Nazis where he was murdered in 1943.

== Selected filmography ==
- Maciste and the Silver King's Daughter (1922)
- A Crazy Night (1927)
- The Most Beautiful Legs of Berlin (1927)
- Dolly Gets Ahead (1930)
- Rag Ball (1930)
- Hocuspocus (1930)
- Die zärtlichen Verwandten (1930)
- Flachsmann the Educator (1930)
- Susanne Cleans Up (1930)
- My Leopold (1931)
- The Soaring Maiden (1931)
- Bobby Gets Going (1931)
- Weekend in Paradise (1931)
- Every Woman Has Something (1931)
- Grock (1931)
- My Heart Longs for Love (1931)
- The Secret of the Red Cat (1931)
- A Woman Branded (1931)
- Headfirst into Happiness (1931)
- When the Soldiers (1931)
- I'll Stay with You (1931)
- Johnny Steals Europe (1932)
- The Testament of Cornelius Gulden (1932)
- Two Hearts Beat as One (1932)
- Scandal on Park Street (1932)
- Gitta Discovers Her Heart (1932)
- The Tsar's Diamond (1932)
- The Importance of Being Earnest (1932)
- Greetings and Kisses, Veronika (1933)
- The Roberts Case (1933)
- Manolescu, Prince of Thieves (1933)
- What Women Dream (1933)
- And Who Is Kissing Me? (1933)
- Snow White and the Seven Dwarfs (1938) (German original dub)
