= Léo Lasko =

German screenwriter

Léo Lasko (1885–1949) was a German screenwriter and film director of the silent and early sound eras. As Lasko was of Jewish descent he was classified as a "non-Aryan" by the Nazis. Following their 1933 takeover he was banned from film work and eventually emigrated to Britain.

== Selected filmography ==
Director

- The Merry Husband (1919)
- The Dagger of Malaya (1919)
- The Panther Bride (1919)
- The Howling Wolf (1919)
- The Woman Without a Soul (1920)
- Va banque (1920)
- Indian Revenge (1920)
- The Pink Jersey (Das rosa Trikot) (1920)
- The Convict of Cayenne (1921)
- James Morres (1921)
- The Devil's Chains (1921)
- The Buried Self (1921)
- Parisian Women (1921)
- People of the Sea (1925)
- Hands Up, Eddy Polo (1928)
- Scapa Flow (1930)
- Night of Temptation (1932)

Screenwriter

- Vendetta (1919)
- Wibbel the Tailor (1920)
- The Land of Smiles (1930)
- Schubert's Dream of Spring (1931)
- Night of Temptation (1932)

== Bibliography ==
- Prawer, Siegbert Salomon (2007) [2005]. Between Two Worlds: The Jewish Presence in German and Austrian Film, 1910–1933. New York: Berghahn Books. ISBN 978-1-84545-303-9.
