= Genia Nikolajewa =

Russian actress

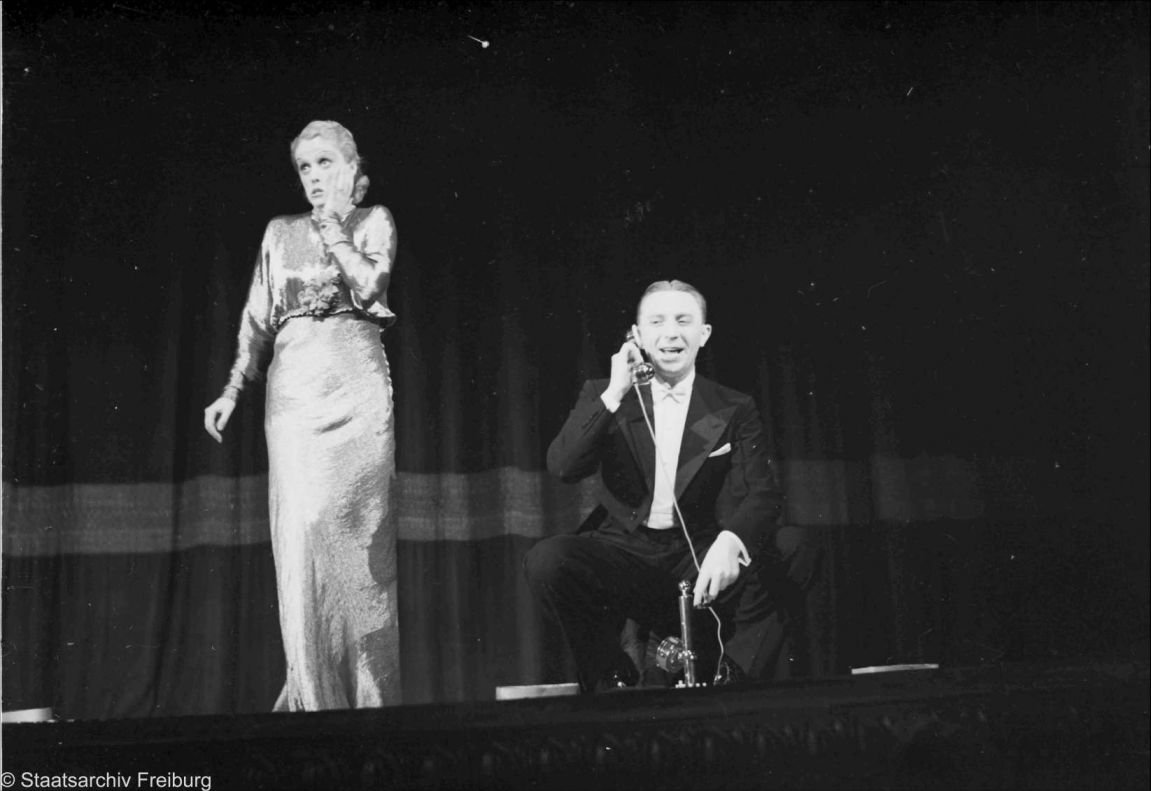
- Nikolajewa with Theo Lingen, Berlin (1936)
- Born: 2 January 1904; St Petersburg, Russian Empire
- Died: 22 December 2001 (aged 97); Los Angeles, California
- Other names: Genia Nikolaieva; Eugenia Nikolajewa
- Occupation: Actress
- Years active: 1930-1942 (film)

Genia Nikolajewa (1904–2001) was a Russian-born German actress who made films in several countries, notably in Germany where she appeared in films such as Robert Siodmak's 1932 comedy Quick in a succession of supporting or minor roles. She later moved to Hollywood. She was sometimes credited as Genia Nikolaieva or Eugenia Nikolajewa.

== Life ==
Nikolaieva was born in St Petersburg to German-Russian parents, but moved to Germany at an early age. She starred in a series of stage revues which led to her being employed by the film industry. Because she was considered "Half-Jewish" (cf. Mischling) by the Nazis, she found it increasingly difficult to gain roles following the Nazi takeover of Germany and in 1938 she went into exile in Hollywood. As well as making occasionally films, she also worked for Warner Brothers in an administrative role. In 1937, she married the film editor Carl Forcht.

== Selected filmography ==
- Shooting Festival in Schilda (1931)
- Quick (1932)
- A Shot at Dawn (1932)
- Scandal on Park Street (1932)
- A Mad Idea (1932)
- The First Right of the Child (1932)
- The Ugly Girl (1933)
- The Grand Duke's Finances (1934)
- Love and the First Railway (1934)
- The Brenken Case (1934)
- Artist Love (1935)
- Lessons in Love (1935)
- Fresh Wind from Canada (1935)
- The Bird Seller (1935)
- Ninety Minute Stopover (1936)
- A Woman of No Importance (1936)
- The Unexcused Hour (1937)
- Escape from Yesterday (1938)
- Adventure in Diamonds (1940)
- The Lady Has Plans (1942)

== Bibliography ==
- Alpi, Deborah Lazaroff. Robert Siodmak: A Biography. McFarland, 1998.
