= Night of Temptation =

1932 film

- Directed by: Léo Lasko; Robert Wohlmuth
- Written by: Léo Lasko; Robert Wohlmuth
- Starring: Werner Fuetterer; Elga Brink; Josef Eichheim
- Cinematography: Karl Hasselmann
- Music by: Friedrich Jung; Peter Kreuder
- Production company: Münchner Lichtspielkunst
- Distributed by: Bavaria Film
- Release date: 9 August 1932
- Running time: 70 minutes
- Country: Germany
- Language: German

Night of Temptation (German: Nacht der Versuchung) is a 1932 German drama film directed by Léo Lasko and Robert Wohlmuth and starring Werner Fuetterer, Elga Brink and Josef Eichheim. It was shot at the Emelka Studios in Munich. The film's sets were designed by the art director Ludwig Reiber and Willy Reiber.

== Cast ==
- Werner Fuetterer
- Elga Brink
- Josef Eichheim
- Lotte Deyers
- Walter Lantzsch
- Otto Wernicke
- Therese Giehse
- Ludwig Rupert
- Max Schreck
- Ernst Schlott
- Toni Forster-Larrinaga
- Ola Ocouma
- Alexandre Mihalesco
- Karl Raab

== Bibliography ==
- Krautz, Alfred (1984). International Directory of Cinematographers, Set- and Costume Designers in Film. Vol. 4. Saur. ISBN 978-3-598-21434-9.
