= Ella Bergmann-Michel =

German abstract artist, photographer and documentary filmmaker

- Born: Ella Bergmann; 20 October 1896; Paderborn, Germany
- Died: 8 August 1971 (aged 74)
- Known for: Painting, collages
- Movement: Constructivist art
- Spouse: Robert Michel

Ella Bergmann-Michel (20 October 1896 – 8 August 1971) was a German abstract artist, photographer and documentary filmmaker. An early student of constructivist art in Germany, Bergmann-Michel developed a style that was specialized and distinctive. Most of her work is not titled or signed, making it hard to identify and find in today's art market.

== Early life ==
Bergmann-Michel began making art at an early age. By 1915 she experimented with a collage technique in the constructivist style. By using wood, metal and any other obscure material, Bergmann-Michel created very exact and scientific looking collages. From 1917 to 1920 she studied at the Weimar Hochschule für Bildenden Kunste under the German painter Walther Klemm. By the 1920s Bergmann-Michel had begun to expand her technique even more. In a time when abstract art was considered a lesser art form, Bergmann-Michel incorporated poetry into abstract pieces; she would paste or paint words onto the canvas. Bergmann became one of the first artists of the constructivist movement to incorporate photography into her artwork.

== Artistic style ==
Constructivism was an art form that originated in Russia in 1915. The Constructivist movements it inspired in various European nations had different meaning, but all referenced through abstract means the social and economic problems that the artists felt represented Europe. In Bergmann-Michel’s homeland of Germany, Constructivism showed its greatest impact through the Bauhaus school, which was established for the development of the art form. Bergmann-Michel underpinned that she cared "not so much for the concentrated stillness of an object, but for the modern and eventful world" and sought to "record time, similar to the photographs by Xanti Schawinsky."

== Marriage and war ==
In 1919, Bergmann-Michel married Robert Michel. Together they pioneered the use of collage using photographs. Their work was included in Société Anonyme, a collection of works by predominantly European Dada artists. In 1920, Bergmann-Michel and her husband moved to Vockenhausen, near Frankfurt Germany. While in Frankfurt she decorated much of the Bauhaus school's minimalist walls. Bergmann-Michel continued doing her art until World War II when she was forced to stop, as the pressure of political events made artistic activity hazardous for her. Between 1933 and 1945, she stayed intermittently in London. Bergmann-Michel worked on her family’s farm until the war ended. Once the war ended she went back to her art. During the 1950s she gave lectures on the development of modern painting and avant-garde films and in the 1960s continued her development of Prism Pictures. In the later years she continued to make picture collages and vertical/horizontal compositions, none of which are titled.

== Legacy ==
Through her life Ella Bergmann-Michel toured Zürich, London, Belfast, Milan, Paris, Poland and the United States. Her art is found primarily in European art markets. It is unknown how many paintings and pieces that Bergmann-Michel completed; her art is more important for the movement that it helped to propel, rather than individual pieces themselves.

== Filmography ==
- Wo wohnen alte Leute. (1931)
- Erwerbslose kochen für Erwerbslose. (1932)
- Fliegende Händler in Frankfurt am Main. (1932)
- Fischfang in der Rhön. (1932)
- Wahlkampf 1932. (1932/33)

== See also ==
- Eppstein
- Alexander Rodchenko
- Women artists
- List of German women artists
