= Margvelashvili =

Margvelashvili (Georgian: მარგველაშვილი) is a Georgian surname, originally from the province of Imereti. Formerly, the Margvelashvili were listed among the gentry (aznauri) and recognized as such in the Russian Empire in the 19th century.

Margvelashvili may refer to:

- Giorgi Margvelashvili (born 1969), the 4th and present President of Georgia.
- Giorgi Margvelashvili (born 1990), Georgian chess player.
- Giwi Margwelaschwili (1927–2020), Georgian-German writer and philosopher.
- Tite Margwelaschwili (1891–1946), Georgian-German writer and philosopher.
