= Lina Maria Becker =

German politician (1898–1976)

Member of the Hamburg Parliament
- In office 1924–1927

Personal details
- Born: 22 March 1898 Hanover, German Empire
- Died: November 3, 1976 (aged 78) Bremen, West Germany
- Party: Communist Party of Germany
- Spouse: Emil Unfried (died 1949)

Lina Maria Becker (22 March 1898 – 3 November 1976) was a German Communist Party politician. Between 1924 and 1927 she was a member of the Hamburg Parliament ("Hamburgische Bürgerschaft").

== Life ==
Lina Maria Becker was born into a working class socialist family in Hanover. After 1918, like her brothers Karl Albin Becker (1894–1942) and Ernst Becker (1900–1932) she joined the newly emerging Communist Party and became politically active in the Hamburg region. Between 1924 and 1927 she sat as a Communist member of the Hamburg Parliament. At some stage she married Emil Unfried (1892–1949), another Communist Party member during the years following the First World War, and later a successful film maker. Like her brothers and her husband, Lina Maria Becker belonged to the relatively moderate right wing of the Communist Party during a decade when the party was increasingly controlled by hard left pro-Stalin leadership. Emil Unfried lost his party membership in 1924, and by the end of the decade his wife had also ceased to be politically active, although there is mention of her having been critical of the German Communist Party leadership in the early 1930s.

Lina Maria Becker-Unfried was widowed in 1949 when her husband died in the NKVD special camp Nr. 7. Despite having rejoined the Communist Party in 1945 he had been denounced to and arrested by the occupying forces who were by that time running the camp. His widow died in 1976, continuing to shun political involvement until her death. By the time she died she was living in Bremen in West Germany, able to live comfortably because of profits remaining from her husband's cinema ownership.
