= Emil Unfried =

German politician and film producer (1892–1949)

- Born: 21 April 1892; Untergrönningen, Württemberg, German Empire
- Died: 16 June 1949 (aged 57); NKVD special camp Nr. 7, Sachsenhausen, Allied-occupied Germany

Emil Unfried (21 April 1892 – 16 June 1949) was a German communist politician. He served in various capacities in the Communist Party until 1924. Later he was involved in the film industry. He resumed his political activity in the Communist Party in 1945. However, the same year he was detained by the Soviets and died in a special camp in Sachsenhausen in 1949.

== Early life and education ==
Unfried was born in Untergrönningen, Württemberg, on 26 April 1892. He was trained as a mechanic. He settled in Stuttgart where he joined the Social Democratic Party in 1912.

== Career and activities ==
Unfried fought in the German army during World War I and became part of the Spartacus group. In 1918 he was a member of the executive committee of the workers' council in Stuttgart. In 1919 he joined the Communist Party and served as its vice chairman in Stuttgart until 1921. He was appointed secretary for agrarian work for the party leadership from 1921 to 1924. He represented the Communist Party at the fourth World Congress of the Communist International in 1922. Unfried was expelled from the Communist Party in 1924 due to his alleged right-wing views.

In the period between 1924 and 1933 Unfried served as the chairman of the film division of a political-cultural enterprise owned by the communist activist Willi Münzenberg. In 1926 Unfried co-founded and directed a film company, Prometheus-Film G.m.b.H. He also headed another company named Weltfilm. In 1933 he retired from politics and began to involve in film production business during the Nazi rule in Germany. His company was Forum Film which mostly produced entertainment movies. He had movie theatres in Hanover and Minden. He resumed his political activities in the Communist Party following the fall of Nazi government in 1945.

== Personal life and death ==
Unfried was married to Lina Becker, a communist politician. He was arrested by the Soviet forces in late 1945. He died in the NKVD special camp Nr. 7 in Sachsenhausen on 16 June 1949.

== Selected filmography ==
Some of the movies produced by Unfried included:

- Aufstieg - Ein Film vom Werden und sozialen Wirken des Verbandes der Fabrikarbeiter Deutschlands (1929)
- Morgen beginnt das Leben (1933)
- Das Gewehr über! (1939)
