= Karl August Nerger =

- Born: 25 February 1875; Rostock, Mecklenburg-Schwerin, German Empire
- Died: 12 January 1947 (aged 71); NKVD special camp Nr. 7, Sachsenhausen, Allied-occupied Germany
- Military career
- Allegiance: German Empire
- Branch: Imperial German Navy
- Service years: 1893–1919
- Rank: Kapitän zur See
- Commands: SMS Wolf
- Awards: Pour le Mérite, Military Order of Max Joseph

Karl August Theodor Julius Nerger (25 February 1875 – 12 January 1947) was a naval officer of the Imperial German Navy in World War I, who achieved fame and recognition during the war for his command of the auxiliary cruiser SMS Wolf.

On 15 August 1945, Nerger was interned by the Soviet Union at the Sachsenhausen NKVD camp where he died two years later.

== Naval career ==
Nerger was born in Rostock, Mecklenburg-Schwerin. Nerger had entered the Navy as a cadet in April 1893, and as a junior officer participated in the China Relief Expedition during the Boxer Rebellion, where he had also been decorated for bravery and intrepidity. In Summer 1914, then-Korvettenkapitän Nerger had taken command of the light cruiser SMS Stettin, which he commanded until taking over SMS Wolf in March 1916. As captain of the Wolf, he led the commerce raider on a 451-day expedition, the longest voyage of a warship during World War I, until May 1918, and was promoted to Fregattenkapitän on 13 January 1917. In May 1918, he became commander of minesweeper units of the High Seas Fleet with the light cruiser Augsburg as his flagship, a command he held until war's end. He retired on 25 July 1919, characterized as a Kapitän zur See.

== Decorations and awards ==
For his exploits, Nerger was awarded the highest military decorations of the five main states of the German Empire, a feat achieved only by Kaiser Wilhelm II himself, Franz Joseph I of Austria-Hungary, Field Marshals Rupprecht, Crown Prince of Bavaria, Duke Albrecht of Württemberg, and Paul von Hindenburg, the Kaiser's son General Crown Prince Wilhelm, Nerger, and one other commerce raider captain, Nikolaus Burggraf und Graf zu Dohna-Schlodien.

Nerger received Prussia's Pour le Mérite on 24 February 1918, the day SMS Wolf returned home. This was followed by Bavaria's Military Order of Max Joseph (28 March 1918), Knight's Cross of Saxony's Military Order of St. Henry (25 February 1918), Württemberg's Military Merit Order, and Baden's Military Karl-Friedrich Merit Order. In addition to these highest awards of the major states, he also received the 1914 Iron Cross 1st and 2nd Class, the Knight's Cross with Swords of Prussia's Royal House Order of Hohenzollern, the Military Merit Cross 1st and 2nd Class of Mecklenburg-Schwerin, the Friedrich August Cross 1st and 2nd Class of Oldenburg, and the Hanseatic Crosses of Hamburg, Bremen and Lübeck.

== Post-World War I ==
Nerger was named an honorary citizen of Rostock in 1919 and received an honorary degree in medicine from the University of Rostock.

Nerger resigned the German Navy almost immediately after the war and did not share the fame that other German commerce raiders enjoyed. Only with the rise of the Nazis to power was Nerger celebrated as a war hero in Germany again. In 1920 he began working for Siemens-Schuckert, where he rose to be in charge of factory security. Nerger benefited from the regime and its persecution of Jews, purchasing a Jewish-owned villa in Potsdam in 1936 for a discount price after the owners were forced to flee. Whether he was involved with the supervision of slave labour used at Siemens during World War II in his role as head of security is unknown but, given his role in the company, historians think it likely.

At the end of World War II, Nerger was arrested by the Soviets and incarcerated at the former Sachsenhausen concentration camp, which had become the NKVD special camp Nr. 7, where he died in January 1947. The official cause of death was reported as cachexia, but, according to former inmate Heinz Masuch, Nerger was actually beaten to death by another inmate, Wilhelm Wagner, who ran a protection racket at the camp. Wagner was found not guilty for the crime, which he denied, in 1967 but sentenced to five years imprisonment for other assaults on inmates.

== Literature ==
- Peter Hohnen & Richard Guilliatt, THE WOLF - The true story of an epic voyage of destruction in World War One, 2009, Bantam Press, ISBN 0-593-06075-X
- Edwin P. Hoyt, Raider Wolf, The Voyage of Captain Nerger, 1916–1918, New York 1974, ISBN 0-8397-7067-7.
- Roy Alexander: The Cruise of the Raider Wolf, Yale University Press, 1939.
