= Otto Nerz =

German football player and coach (1892–1949)

Personal information
- Date of birth: 21 October 1892
- Place of birth: Hechingen, German Empire
- Date of death: 19 April 1949 (aged 56)
- Place of death: NKVD special camp Nr. 7, Sachsenhausen, Allied-occupied Germany
- Position: Forward

Youth career
- –1910: FG Hechingen

Senior career*
| Years | Team | Apps | (Gls) |
| 1910–1919 | VfR Mannheim | | |
| 1919–1924 | Tennis Borussia Berlin | | |

Managerial career
- 1924–1926: Tennis Borussia Berlin
- 1926–1936: Germany
Medal record
Men's Football
Representing Germany
FIFA World Cup
| Third place | 1934 Italy |
- * Club domestic league appearances and goals

Otto Nerz (21 October 1892 – 18 April 1949) was a German football player and manager and the first head coach of the Germany national team between 1923 and 1936.

== Biography ==
=== Early life ===
Nerz was born in Hechingen, Province of Hohenzollern, the son of a rope shopkeeper. He graduated from teacher training college in 1910 as (at 18) then the youngest elementary school teacher in Baden. He volunteered to serve in the German Army in the First World War, until after being wounded in 1916 on the Eastern Front in Galicia and being invalided as a Vice-Sergeant in the reserve. In 1919 he became qualified as a gymnastic and sports teacher at the Badische Landsturnanstalt. In 1922 he entered the German University for Physical Education in Berlin where he lectured alongside studying. His interest in the treatment of sport injuries led to him also entering the medical profession, qualifying as a medical doctor by 1934.

=== Player and management career ===
Nerz played as an amateur for VfR Mannheim and Tennis Borussia Berlin before being appointed as the latter team's manager in 1924 and Germany's first national manager and selector in 1926. At the time, football was not a major sport in Germany, and German football was seen as considerably inferior to that played by other central European countries such as Austria, Hungary, Czechoslovakia and Italy. Nonetheless, under Nerz the team — initially considered one of the weakest in Europe — gradually developed some consistency towards the end of the 1920s and early 1930s. Nerz studied many league and cup games in England, as well as in Austria and Italy, and sought advice on coaching and tactics from internationally respected coaches such as Jimmy Hogan, Hugo Meisl and Vittorio Pozzo in a quest to improve the standards of the Germany national team.

Germany declined to participate in the inaugural World Cup in 1930 in Uruguay, but by the time of the next tournament in 1934, held in Italy, Germany had become a strong side by European standards. In the event, Nerz guided Germany to victories over Belgium and Sweden; a semi-final defeat to Czechoslovakia was followed by a win over the hitherto heavily fancied Austrians to secure a third-place finish. This would be Germany's best international performance until the 1954 World Cup, and it provided a huge boost to the popularity of the sport in Germany.

Nerz had joined the Nazi Party relatively early, prior to Adolf Hitler gaining power in 1933; in the latter year he joined the Sturmabteilung (SA), the Nazi paramilitary organization, in which he rose to rank of SA-Obersturmbannführer by the end of the Second World War. This, combined with his success in the World Cup, meant that the German government placed a high level of expectation on Nerz's team for the 1936 Summer Olympics in Berlin, for which he was team coach. However, Germany was eliminated early in the tournament after a shock defeat to rank outsiders Norway. Shortly thereafter, Nerz was relieved of his duties as coach and replaced by assistant coach Sepp Herberger.

=== Post-management career ===
Following his dismissal from the Germany national team, Nerz took an administrative and coaching position with the Football Association of Berlin. In 1936 he became lecturer at the Reich Academy for Physical Exercise and in 1938 he was appointed by Hitler as a professor in philosophy at the University of Berlin. During the Second World War he was deployed to a military hospital Reserve-Lazarett 21 at Berlin-Britz. In December 1944 he introduced daily exercise regimes for military hospital patients.

Due to his Nazi Party membership, he was arrested as a prisoner of war by the British after the Battle of Berlin, then handed over to the occupying Soviet authorities who later interned him in a camp in Sachsenhausen; after four years of imprisonment, he died of cerebral edema on or around 18 April 1949 and was buried in a mass grave on the site of the camp.
