= Anti-Bolshevist League =

German far-right anti-communist organization

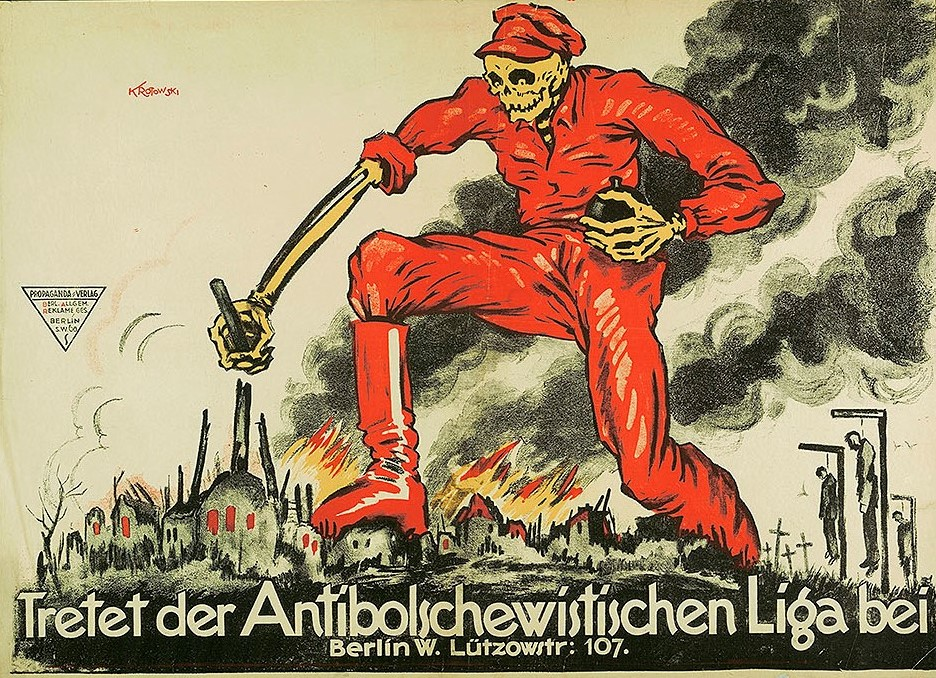
Anti-Bolshevist League propaganda poster, 1919. The text reads: "Join the Anti-Bolshevist League".

The Anti-Bolshevist League (German: Antibolschewistische Liga), later the League for the Protection of German Culture (Liga zum Schutze der deutschen Kultur), was a short-lived German far-right organization that initially opposed the November Revolution and later most notably the Spartacus League. It was founded in early December 1918 by the young conservative and ultra-nationalist publicist Eduard Stadtler. The organization was financed by large industrialists, bankers as well as former representatives of the German aristocracy.

According to Stadtler's memoirs published in 1935, German entrepreneurs organized and paid for the military operations of the Freikorps against the Berlin Spartacist Uprising and the contract killings of Rosa Luxemburg and Karl Liebknecht on January 15, 1919, from a fund connected to the organization.

The Anti-Bolshevik League distributed anti-communist or “anti-Bolshevik” literature and leaflets, sometimes in very large numbers, and organized lectures, exhibitions and training courses. As early as December 1918, the original leadership group was planning to found a "National Socialist” party and agitated for a “German socialism” with a nationalist twist. The circle around Stadtler and Heinrich von Gleichen was ousted from the management of the league in the spring of 1919 and continued its organizational activities in the Juniklub and in the associated Politisches Kolleg, journalistically above all in the magazine the Das Gewissen.

== Background ==
The initiator of the creation of the League was 32-year-old Eduard Stadtler, formerly a school teacher and activist of the Catholic Center Party, who returned from Russian captivity after the end of the First World War. In captivity, he closely watched the Russian Revolution, then he was the press secretary of the German diplomatic mission in Moscow. A staunch anti-communist, Stadtler advocated the violent suppression of Bolshevism.

On November 1, 1918, Stadtler spoke at the Berlin Philharmonic with a report "Bolshevism as a worldwide danger." A few days later, the November Revolution began. Stadtler saw in it an exclusively Marxist danger, the spread of Bolshevism to Europe. He immediately set about organizing an effective anti-communist structure, combining activity among the masses with the support of the industrial and financial elite.

In October he had founded an association for national and social solidarity. Stadtler originally intended this to be called the Association for National Socialism, but the co-founders, including Karl Helfferich, decided to change it, whom Stadtler knew from Moscow, Heinrich von Gleichen and the Catholic trade unionists Adam Stegerwald and Franz Röhr overruled.

From this foundation, in October 1918, the "Solidarity Circle" (also called "Young Club", "Young Front") was called the magazine Das Gewissen, whose most important ideologues, along with Stadtler and peers, were Arthur Moeller van den Bruck and Max Hildebert Boehm. The aim of the Solidarity and their leading member, Heinrich von Gleichen, was to build up a small, elite group. In this they differed from Stadtler, who had a nationalist mass movement in mind. After the proclamation of the republic on November 9, 1918, Stadtler supplied several newspapers with two to three articles a day.

== Founding and program ==
Through the mediation of Helfferich, Stadtler received 5,000 marks in cash personally on November 28, 1918, as a "gift" from the Deutsche Bank from its director Paul Mankiewitz. He received another 3,000 marks from Friedrich Naumann from a political fund. This enabled him to open a General Secretariat for the study and combating of Bolshevism on December 1, 1918 at Lützowstrasse 107 in Berlin. The Anti-Bolshevik League created on the same day was originally intended as an umbrella organization for "friendly" organizations that were yet to be founded or that already existed. By the end of January, the league had set up branches in Hamburg, Bremen, Königsberg, Düsseldorf, Essen, Dresden, Halle, Leipzig and Wroclaw Legally, it was a non-profit association and as such was subject to the supervision of the State Commissioner for the Regulation of War Welfare in Prussia.

Stadtler with his comrades, formed an "action committee" and presented a "rescue program". Among other things, the plan was to found a publishing house to publish anti-Bolshevik propaganda brochures, popular pamphlets under the title "Anti-Spartacus" for mass distribution by parties and other organizations, a lecture cycle, the training of agitators and speakers, and the establishment of an anti-Bolshevik press and news service.

As a nationalist, Stadtler was an ardent opponent of the labor movement and its goals. In doing so, he made no distinction between social democracy and communism, both of which he understood in the sense of a conspiracy theory as an attack on all values of the German nation. Immediately after the end of the war, Stadtler, who had left the Center Party in 1918, tried to persuade leaders of German industry and right-wing party and media representatives to fight Bolshevism. Early on, he saw it as insufficient that the program of anti-Bolshevism was initially only negative, and therefore looked for an alternative model of society. As opposed to the “class struggle-Socialism" of the workers' parties, he propagated "the dictatorship of a national" or "Christian-national socialism". On the one hand, this objective was intended to protect private ownership of the means of production from expropriation, as demanded by the Soviet movement in the November Revolution, and on the other hand to abolish parliamentary democracy in favor of a "purposeful dictatorial government" in order to end "party and class warfare" within the framework of an authoritarian to "overcome" family society. The industrialist Hugo Stinnes initially approved of this concept of socialism. In January 1919, Stadtler spoke at his invitation to a meeting of industrialists from the Ruhr area in about his concept of "German socialism". In the propaganda of the League, the concepts of Soviets, revolution and socialism were emptied of their political and social content, turned anti-communist and used as a means of nationalist mobilization of broad sections of society. This was accompanied by the propaganda staging of a national (popular) community among the “Solidarians”.

In order to make this project plausible, the League clearly exaggerated the danger of a Bolshevik takeover of power in Germany.

At the beginning of December, the League in Berlin published numerous leaflets and posters calling for the assassination of leading figures in the Spartacus League. Two of Stadtler's brochures appeared simultaneously with initial print runs of 50,000 and 100,000 copies respectively. On December 8, 1918, the League's premises were searched and sealed by members of a workers' militia. However, the Berlin executive council intervened and even ordered the return of the confiscated propaganda material.

== Establishment of the Anti-Bolshevik Fund ==
On January 10, 1919, around 50 top representatives of German industry, commerce and banking met and set up an anti-Bolshevik fund for German entrepreneurs. Paul Mankiewitz from Deutsche Bank organized the meeting in the rooms of the Flugverbandshaus in Berlin. Among the invited participants, who were expressly intended to appear in person, were the head of the industrial association, Hugo Stinnes, Albert Vögler, Carl Friedrich von Siemens, Otto Henrich (Siemens-Schuckert-Werke), Ernst von Borsig, Felix Deutsch from AEG, Arthur Salomonsohn from Disconto-Gesellschaft.

The only item on the agenda was Stadtler's lecture "Bolshevism as a World Danger", which was intended to convince the business people present of the need to act against the revolution. In the general dismay at the lecture, Stinnes is said to have said, according to Stadtler's memories, that he considered any discussion superfluous, that he shared Stadtler's statements "in every point" and suggested that German industry should therefore provide 500 million marks. This sum was approved in the next room and apportioned to German capital via the associations of industry, commerce and banks. The American social historian Gerald D. Feldman gives significantly lower numbers: According to this, the fund received five million Reichsmarks from each business leader present.

Stadtler reports in his memoirs that a newly formed board of trustees managed the funds. One of Hugo Stinnes' confidants was entrusted with managing and distributing this fund. From then on, money from this fund flowed generously to all anti-Bolshevik groups, including the following organizations:

- The Anti-Bolshevik League under the code name General Secretariat to study and combat Bolshevism
- The Union for Combating Bolshevism
- The citizen council movement (cf. Reich Citizens' Council)
- Recruitment agencies for the Freikorps
- Student jobs
- Self-protection formations (cf. residents' militias)
- The coffers of the active troops
- The Social Democratic Party of Germany.

A bank loan of 50 million Reichsmarks was immediately made available immediately after it was set up. Alexander Ringleb was responsible for the administration and distribution of the incoming sums, for which he gave up his previous work as a judge. The existence of the fund is considered to be certain in research, but the 500 million marks mentioned by Stadtler - an enormous amount at this point in time despite already noticeable inflation - are regarded as an "exaggeration or [...] [total sum] from the inflationary period".

== Contract killings ==
In his memoirs, Stadtler reports how, after the end of the Spartacist Uprising, on January 12, 1919, he visited Waldemar Pabst, the commander of the Garde-Kavallerie-Schützen-Division, which was one of the largest troop units still intact in the Reichswehr under the supreme command of Hans von Seeckt had been ordered to Berlin at the beginning of the year to put down uprisings against the provisional Reich government, in the Eden Hotel. He had convinced him of the "necessity" of the killings and broke "Gustav Noske's hesitance" about using the military in Berlin days before:

“Parliament could remain stolen from us soldiers at the front, it would depend on men and deeds; if there are no leaders to be seen on our side for the time being, then at least the other side shouldn’t have any either.”

Probably through an informer paid by one of Stadtler's organizations, Liebknecht and Luxemburg were tracked down by a "Wilmersdorf militia" on the evening of January 15 in their hiding place they had just occupied in Wilmersdorf, taken prisoner and taken to the Hotel Eden. In the later trials against their murderers, it was repeatedly stated that an "auxiliary service of the SPD" had offered a bounty of 100,000 marks for the capture of the Spartacus leaders. After severe mistreatment they were murdered during the night by members of the Guards Cavalry Rifle Division - according to Stadtler "Major Pabst's men". The members of the troop and vigilante received a large reward per person, which, as non-fiction author Frederik Hetman presumed also came from the anti-Bolshevik fund.

== End of big finance ==
As the immediate danger of the "Sovietization" of Germany subsided, the League increasingly emphasized the solidarity and national socialist elements of its ideology. Stadtler talked about active work with trade unions and the creation of works councils. Many former sponsors of the League spoke with indignation about Stadtler's "social demagogy". Already in March 1919, Stadtler was forced to leave the leadership of the League and focused on activities in the Association for National and Social Solidarity.

== Transformation to the League for Protection of German Culture ==
In February 1919, leading members of the League such as Stadtler, Ernst Troeltsch, Gleichen and Joachim Tiburtius published a call for the establishment of a League for the Protection of German Culture in the Catholic daily Germania. The Anti-Bolshevik League appeared under this name from then on. The organization's leadership felt the renaming was necessary after major league events in Essen and Hamburg were blasted by workers. This seemed to indicate that the original name was "burnt". Gleichen had also advised the renaming in order to make it clear "that our 'anti-Bolshevism' is under no circumstances only negative or even contains a tip against the workers." Stadtler explained that they wanted to break away from the competing association to combating Bolshevism, which published hate posters with bounty awards on Karl Radek and other leading members of the Spartacus League. After Stadtler's withdrawal, the league largely gave up the "National Socialist" thrust of its publications and events. Now she took a more moderate course and from then on devoted herself to "enlightenment" about the "dangers" of communism. In this phase it was financed, among other things, by the Reich Citizens' Council. However, big industry and banks remain influential. By the summer of 1919 the League had published eight different series of pamphlets containing some 70 individual titles and a large number of leaflets. The pamphlets bore titles such as In the "Bolshevik Madhouse", "The Imperialism of the Bolsheviks", "The Despots of the Soviet Republic and Asian Bolshevism - the end of Germany and Europe?". The league continued the agitation of this type in the following years. According to documents from the Reich Commissioner for the Surveillance of Public Order, by the end of 1922 she had organized exhibitions in 80 German cities that were visited by around 800,000 people, as well as around 8,600 lectures and around 400 training courses lasting several weeks, usually with 120 to 150 participants.

== Historical interpretation ==
In the history of East Germany, the Anti-Bolshevik fund was cited several times as evidence for the "agent theory", according to which “monopoly capital” stood behind Stadtler and ultimately financed fascism. The Munich historian Werner Maser also assumes that "money from the 'anti-Bolshevik fund of the economy' also flowed to the NSDAP with certainty". According to the Berlin historian Ernst Nolte, "with this approach immediately winning a majority in the bourgeois camp, without having an impact on the masses - the radical right laid the foundations for their counterattack in the first few months after the revolution."
