= Everything for a Woman =

1935 film

- Directed by: Alfred Abel
- Written by: Hans Vietzke; Max Wallner
- Produced by: Fritz Neuss; Hermann Schmidt; Kurt Ulrich
- Starring: Gustav Diessl; Charlotte Susa; Harry Frank
- Cinematography: Franz Koch
- Music by: Gert van Stetten
- Production companies: Delta Film; K.U. Filmproduktion
- Release date: 14 February 1935
- Running time: 84 minutes
- Country: Germany
- Language: German

Everything for a Woman (German: Alles um eine Frau) is a 1935 German drama film directed by Alfred Abel and starring Gustav Diessl, Charlotte Susa and Harry Frank. It was shot at the EFA Studios in Berlin's Halensee.

== Cast ==
- Gustav Diessl as Frederic Keyne, Flugzeuginsustrieller
- Charlotte Susa as Blanche, seine Frau
- Harry Frank as Chefingenieur Thompson in den Keynewerken
- Hans Kettler as Chefpilot Stevens in den Keynewerken
- Paul Hartmann as Heinrich Droop, Besitzer einer Tankstelle
- Willi Schur as Krüger, sein Monteur
- Olaf Fjord as Henry Durand, ein Tänzer
- Hubert von Meyerinck as Maxwell, ein dunkler Ehrenmann
- Gerhard Bienert as Tim, ein verkrachter Artist
- Albert Hörrmann as Tom, ein verkrachter Artist
- Anna Müller-Lincke as Frau Winter
- Carsta Löck as Mary, ihre Tochter

== Bibliography ==
- Klaus, Ulrich J. Deutsche Tonfilme: Jahrgang 1933. Klaus-Archiv, 1988.
- Rentschler, Eric. The Ministry of Illusion: Nazi Cinema and Its Afterlife. Harvard University Press, 1996.
- Waldman, Harry. Nazi Films in America, 1933-1942. McFarland, 2008.
