= Reich Citizens' Council =

Conservative advocacy group in the Weimar Republic

The Reich Citizens‘ Council (German: Reichsbürgerrat) was the umbrella organisation for the citizens’ councils that were set up across Germany to oppose the workers‘ and soldiers’ councils that had taken over many local governments in the early weeks of the German revolution of 1918–1919.

After the parliamentary Weimar Republic was established and the workers' and soldiers' councils disbanded, the Reich Citizens' Council adopted a programme to fight Marxism, alter the terms of the Treaty of Versailles and end the "command economy". It worked with or supported other conservative and far-right groups such as the Anti-Bolshevist League and the German Agrarian League. The Kapp Putsch of March 1920 split and seriously weakened the council, but it was still able to use its influence to help elect Paul von Hindenburg president of Germany in 1925 and block a referendum to expropriate the properties of the former German princes in 1926. By the time the Nazi Party came to power in 1933, the Reich Citizens' Council was no longer playing a significant political role.

== Foundation ==
At the beginning of November 1918, workers' and soldiers' councils spread the German revolution to cities across the German Empire. Meeting with little to no resistance, they formed quickly, took over city governments and key buildings, caused most of the locally stationed military to flee and brought about the abdications of all of Germany's ruling monarchs, including Emperor Wilhelm II when they reached Berlin on 9 November 1918.

The citizens' councils that emerged in November and December 1918 in many German cities were committees and commissions whose purpose was initially to gather together the middle-class politicians and other municipal officials who had been pushed to the sidelines by the workers' and soldiers' councils. The citizens' councils were dedicated primarily to promoting the rapid convening of a national assembly, which they hoped would delegitimize and disempower the workers' and soldiers' councils. Many citizens' councils emphasised influencing front-line soldiers who were returning from the war. In December, some citizens' councils began to initiate or finance the formation of Freikorps units, including the Berlin Citizens' Council under the leadership of Salomon Marx. The Leipzig Citizens' Council cooperated with a group of former and active officers who called themselves the “White Guard”. The Munich Citizens' Council participated with officers and right-wing extremist circles in the preparation of a failed coup attempt, while the Bremen Citizens' Council intended to stage a coup against the workers' and soldiers' council there. In the spring of 1919, the citizens' councils in many cities and towns played a role in ending the workers' councils, sending out “cries for help”, drawing up lists of arrests and, in some cases, taking independent armed action.

== Organisation and aims ==
On 5 January 1919, representatives of about 300 citizens' councils gathered at the invitation of the Berlin Citizens' Council in the auditorium of the University of Berlin to found a Reich Citizens' Council (Reichsbürgerrat). The theologian and German Democratic Party (DDP) member of the Weimar National Assembly, Friedrich Naumann, gave the welcoming address. The Reich Citizens' Council initially based its advocacy on the slogan of “equal rights for the middle class”, rhetorically depicting and opposing the “lawless class rule” of the workers. The council's president spoke of a “lunatic ideology, un-German, Russian, alien to our nature”.

According to its initial statement, the Reich Citizens' Council was a "non-partisan collective movement" in which politicians from the centrist DDP to the national-conservative German National People's Party (DNVP) worked together. From the outset, however, differences were unmistakable, especially regarding the question of whether to fight the Social Democratic Party (SPD) or work with it. A few left-liberals did not reject the German revolution outright and recognised that it was "deeply embedded in our own circumstances", but the majority saw it as "a senseless copy of the Russian events".

The rapid reorganisation of Germany's pre-war middle-class parties soon after the Reich Citizens' Council was formed deprived it of some of its significance. With the largely completed disempowerment and eventual disappearance of the workers‘ and soldiers’ councils in the spring of 1919, interest in a unified political "bourgeois bloc" also waned, at least at the level of national politics. The Reich Citizens' Council was nevertheless able to stabilise as an organisation after a second Reich Conference on 30 March 1919. It initiated the founding of regional citizens‘ councils, of which there were 13 in the spring of 1920, with some 330 local citizens’ councils. The Bavarian Citizens‘ Council, which operated as the Bavarian Citizens’ Bloc, played a particularly important role, promoting the expansion of the regional residents' militias and later maintaining close ties to the paramilitary Organisation Escherich. The German Agrarian League, German National Association of Commercial Employees and numerous similar groups joined as corporate members.

The Reich Citizens‘ Council joined other organisations corporately, including the Anti-Bolshevist League, which it co-financed. It also entered into various working-group agreements, for example with the veterans' Kyffhäuser League. On 26 July 1919, the Reich Citizens’ Council went public with an action programme with the goals of ‘"educating the people to have a sense of community and devotion to the state", "promoting the efforts to establish local citizens' defence forces", "supporting the spread of anti-Bolshevik information", "bridging class antagonisms", "dismantling the command economy" and "maintaining a healthy class of artisans and small traders".

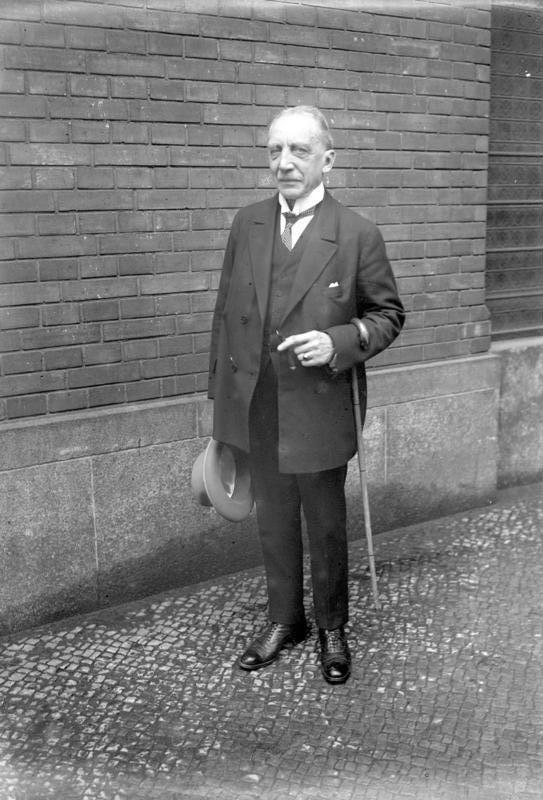
Friedrich Wilhelm von Loebell, the Reich Citizens' Council leader from late 1919

At the end of 1919, the forces that wanted to end the temporary cooperation with the Social Democrats and – without saying so openly – considered the restoration of the monarchy a possibility, took control of the Reich Citizens' Council under the leadership of the former Prussian minister of the interior Friedrich Wilhelm von Loebell. Loebell presented a Reich Citizens' Programme that was similar to its action programme. It included demands for a revision of the Treaty of Versailles – a brochure about the “war guilt lie” was distributed with a print run of 4.5 million copies – and for the elimination of the domestic political consequences of the collapse of the German Empire. Workers' strikes were to be fought with citizens' “counter-strikes”. The need for a free economy was also strongly emphasised. Political and economic measures that restricted the economy were to be eliminated, including the eight-hour day and the right to unemployment benefits. The vice-chairman, Rudolf Meyer-Absberg, saw the Citizens' Council as the nucleus of a bourgeois united front, which had only "one enemy to fight in every form of its appearance: Marxism". "Right-wing socialists, Bolsheviks, syndicalists and communists" were all to be eliminated.

== Political activities and demise ==
The 1920 Kapp Putsch revealed the structural problem of the citizens' council movement. Some local councils openly supported the coup attempt, while others – in Leipzig, Frankfurt am Main, Bochum and Stuttgart, for example – opposed it. A majority, including the Reich Citizens' Council, opposed the general strike that the SPD initiated to stop the putsch, called for the maintenance of law and order and thus passively supported the putschists. Loebell visited Wolfgang Kapp on the evening of 14 March and informed him of the initially wait-and-see attitude of most of the citizens‘ councils, which is said to have made a “strong impression” on him.

After the putsch's collapse, the importance of the Reich Citizens‘ Council and the individual citizens’ councils quickly declined. The different strategic conceptions of the various factions and currents of bourgeois politics could no longer be united with any stability following the elimination of the revolutionary threat. The council began to advocate a "corporatist-oriented presidential cabinet " and saw the Communist Party of Germany (KPD) as its main political opponent.

In 1921 the Council helped found the Working Committee of German Associations to Create a United Front to Combat the Guilt Lie, which developed into one of the most active and influential nationalist propaganda organisations. In 1925, the Reich Citizens' Council played an important role in launching Paul von Hindenburg's candidacy for president of Germany. It disliked the party system under the Weimar Republic and had proposed amending the constitution to strengthen the president while weakening the Reichstag and the role of the cabinet. In order to achieve the goal, it needed a president who was above party politics and more amenable to their approach than Friedrich Ebert of the SPD, who had been president since the founding of the Republic. After he died in February 1925, the Reich Council threw its support behind Hindenburg. He was elected, but the council's proposed constitutional changes failed to gain support.

The Reich Citizens' Council also took part in the agitation against the proposal to expropriate the German royal houses without compensation in 1926. The failure of the expropriation referendum is considered the last of the council's successes. Without setting any recognisable agenda of its own, it worked with the old right-wing conservative camp in its agitation against the political left, the Locarno Treaties (1925), Germany's entry into the League of Nations (1926), and the Young Plan (1929).

After 1926 it fell into a state of structural crisis. By the time of the rise of the Nazi Party, it had been exhausted politically.
