= German National Association of Commercial Employees =

Former German nationalist and antisemitic labour union

- Deutschnationaler Handlungsgehilfen-Verband
- Formation: 1893; 133 years ago
- Dissolved: 1933; 93 years ago
- Type: Far-right trade union
- Legal status: Defunct
- Purpose: Promotion of reactionary politics
- Members: approx. 400,000 (1932 est.)
- Official language: German

The German National Association of Commercial Employees, also known as the German National Union of Commercial Employees (German: Deutschnationaler Handlungsgehilfen-Verband, DHV) was a German nationalist and antisemitic labour union founded in Germany in 1893. It had links with the German Social Party, the Pan-German League and the Reich Citizens' Council.

The DHV was directed against social democracy, had an anti-democratic and anti-liberal ideology and supported the concept of a conservative revolution. It promoted the interests of the merchant class. To prevent the spread of social democratic thoughts, it propagated patriotic and Völkisch mentality. It is considered a proto-fascist or pre-fascist movement, and was vocally anti-feminist. It existed between 1893 and 1933.

By 1914, the DHV had 160,000 members and by 1932 it had over 400,000 members. It cooperated with the Nazi Party and sought to unite Nazism and political Catholicism together.
