= Expropriation of the Princes in the Weimar Republic =

Failed 1926 German referendum

1926 German referendum
- 20 June 1926
- Expropriation of Princely Assets
- Outcome: Not passed

Results
Choice	Votes	%
For	14,455,181	96.11%
Against	585,714	3.89%
Valid votes	15,040,895	96.42%
Invalid or blank votes	558,995	3.58%
Total votes	15,599,890	100.00%
Registered voters/turnout	39,787,013	39.21%
- Results by district and independent city. Black lines delineate states and Prussian provinces.

The Expropriation of the Princes (German: Fürstenenteignung) was the proposed seizure of the dynastic properties of the former ruling houses of the German Empire during the period of the Weimar Republic. The princes had been deposed in the German Revolution of 1918–19. Dispute over the proposed expropriation began in the months of revolution and continued in the following years in the form of negotiations or litigation between individual royal houses and the states (Länder) of the German Reich. The climactic points of the conflict were a successful petition for a referendum in the first half of 1926, followed by the actual referendum for expropriation without compensation, which failed.

The petition was initiated by the German Communist Party (KPD), who were then joined, with some reluctance, by the Social Democrats (SPD). It was not only the KPD and SPD voters who supported expropriation without compensation. Many supporters of the Centre Party and the liberal German Democratic Party (DDP) were also in favour. In some regions voters of conservative national parties also supported expropriation. Associations of the aristocracy, the churches of the two major denominations, large-scale farming and industrial interest groups as well as right-wing parties and associations supported the dynastic houses. Their calls for a boycott finally brought about the failure of the referendum. Expropriation without compensation was replaced by individual compensation agreements, which regulated the distribution of the estates among the states and the former ruling families.

Politicians and historians have differing interpretations of the events. While the official East German version of history stressed the actions of the Communist Party of the time, West German historians pointed to the substantial burdens that the referendum initiatives put on the cooperation between the SPD and the republican parties of the bourgeoisie. Attention is also drawn to the generational conflicts that emerged in this political dispute. The campaign for expropriation without compensation is also sometimes seen as a positive example of direct democracy.

== Developments up to the end of 1925 ==
The 1918 November Revolution ended the reign of the ruling dynasties in Germany. These found themselves in a position of having to abdicate power and, given the new overall political situation, did this voluntarily or were deposed. Their property was seized, but they were not immediately dispossessed, in contrast to the situation in Austria. There were no seizures of assets at the national level because there was no corresponding property. The national authorities did not implement a nationwide policy but left it up to the individual states. In addition the Council of the People's Deputies was concerned that any such seizures of property might encourage the victors to lay claim to the confiscated estates for reparations.

Article 153 of the Weimar Constitution of 1919 guaranteed property, but the article also provided for the possibility of seizure of assets in the public interest. Such a seizure of assets was permitted only on the basis of a law and the dispossessed were entitled to "reasonable" compensation. The article provided for recourse to the courts in case of disputes.

The negotiations between the governments of each state and the royal houses were protracted because of the differing views on the level of compensation. The negotiating parties often struggled with the question of what the former rulers were entitled to as private property, as opposed to those possessions which they held only in their capacity as sovereign. On the basis of Article 153 of the Constitution, some royal houses demanded the return of all their former property and compensation for lost income. The situation was complicated by the decreasing value of money as a result of inflation, which reduced the value of compensation payments. For this reason, some of the royal families subsequently contested agreements that they had previously concluded with the states.

The properties concerned were of considerable significance to the economy. The smaller states, especially, depended for their existence on being able to get control of the major assets. In Mecklenburg-Strelitz, for example, the disputed land alone represented 55 per cent of the area of the state. In other, smaller, states the figure was 20 per cent to 30 per cent of the area. In larger states like Prussia or Bavaria, however, the percentage of disputed land was of little significance, but the absolute sizes involved were equivalent to duchies elsewhere. The demands of the royal houses totalled 2.6 billion marks.

In the courts, the mostly conservative and monarchist judges repeatedly decided in favour of the royal houses. A Reichsgericht judgment of 18 June 1925, in particular, was the cause of public resentment. It struck down a law which the USPD-dominated parliament of Saxe-Gotha had passed on 31 July 1919 for the purpose of the confiscation of all the demesne land of the Dukes of Saxe-Coburg and Gotha. The judges held this state law to be unconstitutional. They returned all the land and forest to the former ruling house. The total value of the assets returned amounted to 37.2 million gold marks. At the time, the head of the dynastic house was Charles Edward, Duke of Saxe-Coburg and Gotha, an avowed enemy of the Republic.

Prussia also negotiated for a long time with the House of Hohenzollern. The first attempt to reach agreement failed in 1920 against the resistance of the Social Democrats in the Prussian parliament; a second attempt failed in 1924 because of opposition from the House of Hohenzollern. On 12 October 1925, the Prussian Ministry of Finance submitted a new draft agreement, which was heavily criticized by the public, however, because it provided for about three-quarters of the disputed real estate to be returned to the princely house. This settlement was opposed not only by the SPD but also by the DDP, turning against its own finance minister Hermann Hoepker-Aschoff. In this situation, the DDP submitted a bill to the Reichstag on 23 November 1925. This would empower the states to pass state laws regulating property disputes with the former princely houses, against which there would be no legal recourse. The SPD had few objections to this, having previously drafted a similar bill itself.

== Initiative for a petition for a referendum ==
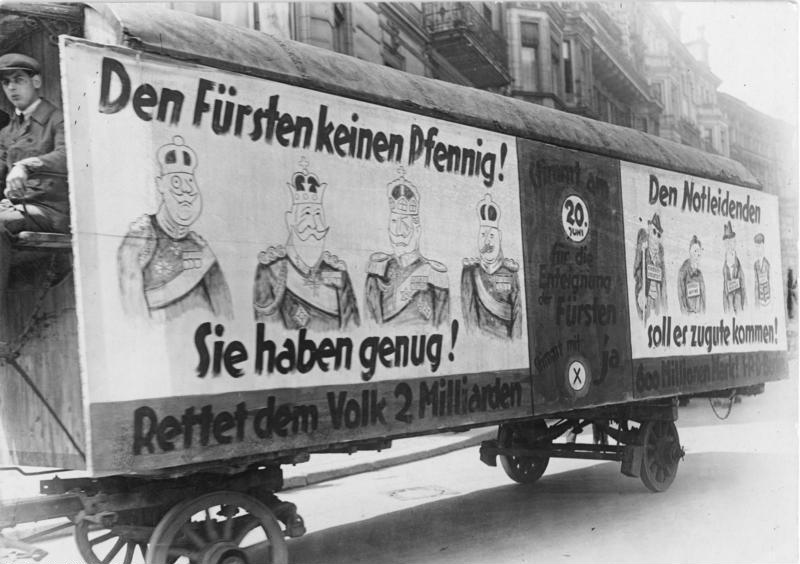
Petition for a referendum in 1926: No money for the princes.

Two days later, on 25 November 1925, the Communist Party also initiated a bill. This did not provide for any balancing of interests between the states and the royal houses, but instead specified expropriation without compensation. The land was to be handed over to farmers and tenants; palaces were to be converted into convalescent homes or used to alleviate the housing shortage; and the cash was to go to disabled war veterans and surviving dependants of those who had fallen in the War. The bill was addressed less to the parliament, where it was unlikely to gain a majority, as to the populace. The petition for a referendum was meant to allow the people to express its will for a radical change in the ownership of property, first of all with respect to the seized property of the ruling houses.

The Communists realised that such a legislative initiative was attractive at a time of rising unemployment, mainly due to the sharp economic downturn since November 1925, as well as what was known as the "rationalisation crisis". Also, the recent hyperinflation was still in people's minds. This had shown the value of real estate, which is what was available for distribution. In line with the united front policy, the Communist Party initiative aimed at regaining lost voters and possibly also appealing to the middle classes, who were among the losers of inflation. As part of this strategy, on 2 December 1925, the Communist Party invited the SPD, the Allgemeiner Deutscher Gewerkschaftsbund; ADGB; General German Trade Union Federation, the Allgemeiner freier Angestelltenbund (English: General Free Federation of Employees), the German Civil Service Federation, the Reichsbanner Schwarz-Rot-Gold and the Rotfrontkämpferbund (Red Front League) to join in starting a petition for a referendum.

At first, the SPD reacted negatively. The Communist Party's efforts to drive a wedge between the social-democratic "masses" and the SPD "fat cat" leaders was too transparent. In addition, the SPD leadership still saw the possibility of resolving the disputed issues by parliamentary means. Another reason for reservations about the initiative was the prospect of failure. More than half of all eligible voters in Germany, nearly 20 million voters, would have to vote yes in a referendum if the law had the effect of amending the constitution. However, in the preceding national election of 7 December 1924, the KPD and the SPD had achieved only about 10.6 million votes.

In early 1926, the mood within the SPD changed. Discussions on the inclusion of social democrats in the national government finally broke down in January, so the SPD was then able to concentrate more on opposition politics. This was also the reason for rejecting another bill that had been drawn up by the second cabinet of Hans Luther. This bill, which was finally presented on 2 February, provided for a new legal construction to handle the issue. A special court under the chairmanship of the Supreme Court President Walter Simons would have sole responsibility for the assets disputes. There was no provision for review of existing agreements between the states and the former ruling houses. Compared with the parliamentary initiative of the DDP from November 1925, this was a development that was favourable to the former ruling houses. For the SPD leadership, these factors were important but secondary; the main reason for the change of mood in the SPD leadership was something else: at the base of the SPD, there was a clear support for the legislative initiative of the Communist Party, and the party leadership feared significant loss of influence, members and voters if they ignored this sentiment.

On 19 January 1926, the chairman of the Communist Party, Ernst Thalmann, called upon the SPD to participate in what was called the Kuczynski Committee. This ad hoc committee, which was formed in mid-December 1925 from people associated with the German Peace Society and the German League for Human Rights, was named after the statistician Robert René Kuczynski and was preparing a petition for a referendum for the expropriation of the former ruling houses. About 40 different pacifist, leftist and communist groups belonged to it. Within the committee, the Communist Party and its affiliated organizations had the greatest importance. As late as 19 January, the SPD still rejected the Communist Party's proposal to join the Kuczynski Committee and, instead, asked the ADGB to mediate talks. These talks were intended to present to the people, in a petition for a referendum, a bill for the expropriation of the former ruling houses that had the support of as many groups as possible. The ADGB acceded to this request.

The talks between the KPD, the SPD and the Committee Kuczynski, which were moderated by the ADGB, began on 20 January 1926. Three days later, they agreed on a common bill. The bill provided for the expropriation of the former rulers and their families "for the public good". On 25 January, the bill went to the Ministry of the Interior with the request to quickly set a date for a petition for a referendum. The ministry scheduled the petition for the period for 4–17 March 1926. So far, the united front tactic of the Communists was successful only in the technical sense: the SPD and KPD had drawn up an agreement on the production and distribution of petition lists and posters. A united front in the political sense was still soundly rejected by the SPD. They made a point of carrying out all agitation events alone, not jointly with the Communist Party. Local organizations of the SPD were warned against any such advances from the Communist Party and censured where any such offers had been accepted. The ADGB also made public that there was no united front with the Communists.

As well as the workers' parties, the referendum campaign was publicly supported by the ADGB, the Red Front League and a number of prominent figures, such as Albert Einstein, Käthe Kollwitz, John Heartfield and Kurt Tucholsky for the referendum. The opponents of the project, with varying degrees of commitment, were mainly to be found in the bourgeois parties, the Reichslandbund (National Land League), numerous "national" organizations, and the churches.

== Result of the petition for a referendum ==
Results of the petition by district and independent city. Black lines delineate states and Prussian provinces.

The petition for a referendum, carried out in the first half of March 1926, underlined the capacity of the two workers' parties to mobilize people. Of the 39.4 million eligible voters, 12.5 million entered themselves in the official lists. The minimum participation of ten per cent of the voters was thus exceeded by a factor of more than three.

The number of votes that the KPD and SPD had achieved in the Reichstag elections in December 1924 was exceeded by almost 18 per cent. Particularly striking was the high level of support in the strongholds of the Centre Party. Here, the number of supporters of the petition was much higher than the total number of votes received by the KPD and SPD.at the previous general election. Even domains of liberalism such as Württemberg exhibited similar trends. Particularly marked were the gains recorded in large cities. Expropriation without compensation was supported not just by supporters of the workers' parties but also by many voters in the centre and right-wing parties.

In rural areas, however, there was often strong resistance to the petition. In particular in East Elbia, the KPD and SPD could not achieve the results of the last general election. Administrative obstacles to the referendum and threats by large farming employers towards employees had an effect. In Lower Bavaria in particular, there was a similar below-average participation. Bavaria had the second lowest participation, after the tiny state of Waldeck, The Bavarian People's Party (BVP) and the Catholic Church vigorously and successfully advised against taking part in the petition. Also, a largely uncontroversial agreement with the House of Wittelsbach had been successfully negotiated in 1923.

== Preparation and outcome of the referendum ==
Statements by political parties and social groups on the plebiscites
DNVP
"If, by the cowardly rape of the property of the defenseless princes, the principle that property is sacred is once violated, then general nationalisation, the expropriation of all private property will soon follow, be it large factories or a carpenter's workshop, be it huge department stores or a greengrocer's shop, be it a country estate or a suburban garden, be it a large bank or a labourer's savings book."

The Kreuzzeitung, a newspaper politically affiliated with the DNVP, wrote: "After the Princes' property it will be the turn of something else. The destructive Jewish spirit of bolshevism knows no bounds".

BVP
The BVP called the referendum an infiltration of the state and society by Bolshevik movements in the state and in society. The expropriation plan was considered to be a grave violation of the moral imperative of protection of private property. Also, the referendum constituted unacceptable interference in the internal affairs of Bavaria, which had already reached an agreement with the Wittelsbachs. It would be equivalent to a rape of the Bavarian people.
Catholic Church
The Catholic clergy united in the Fulda Bishops' Conference and the Freising Bishops' Conference, saw the expropriation project as a "confusion of moral principles" that must be resisted. The view of property that it manifested, they said, was incompatible with the principles of Christian morals". Property should be protected because it is "founded in the natural moral order, and protected by God's commandment". It was expressed more dramatically by Anton von Henle, the bishop of Passau, who said that participation in the petition for a referendum was "a grave sin against God's Seventh Commandment". He urged those who had supported the referendum to withdraw their signatures.
Protestant Church
The Senate of the Prussian Union of churches, the governing body of by far the largest Church in Germany, avoided mention of the dynastic princes, but its warning was nonetheless clear: "Loyalty and faith will be shaken, and the foundations of an ordered polity will be undermined if individuals have their entire assets taken away without compensation."

The German Evangelical Church Committee, the highest organ of the German Evangelical Church Confederation, rejected the expropriation plan. "The expropriation without compensation proposed by the petition means Germans being deprived of their rights and is contrary to the clear and unambiguous principles of the Gospel."

SPD
June 20 is the day when the "decisive battle.. between a democratic Germany and the re-emergent forces of the past" will be fought. "It's about the future of the German Republic. It's about whether the political power embodied in the state is supposed to be a tool of domination in the hands of an upper class or a tool of liberation in the hands of the working masses.
KPD
The KPD regarded the campaign for expropriation without compensation as a first step on the way to a revolutionary transformation of society. In this sense, said the Central Committee of the Communist Party, "the hatred against the crowned robbers is the class hatred against capitalism and its system of slavery!"

In the Hesse state parliament, on 5 March 1926, Daniel Greiner, the Communist member of parliament expressed it as follows: "...once hand is laid upon the private property of the Princes, it is not far to the next step: addressing private property as such. It would be a blessing if it finally came to that."

Elsewhere, Communist propaganda asked the question: "Russia gave its rulers five grams of lead. What does Germany give its rulers?"

On 6 May 1926, the bill for expropriation without compensation was voted on by the Reichstag. Because the bourgeois parties were in the majority, it failed by a vote of 236 to 142. Per Article 73, paragraph 3 of the Weimar Constitution, if the bill had been adopted without amendment, a referendum would have been avoided.

On 15 March, before the bill failed in the Reichstag, President Hindenburg had already added another hurdle to the success of the referendum. On that day, he informed Justice Minister Wilhelm Marx that the intended expropriations did not serve the public interest but represented nothing more than fraudulent conversion of assets for political reasons. This was not permitted by the Constitution. On 24 April 1926, the Luther government expressly confirmed the President's legal opinion. For this reason, a simple majority was not sufficient for the success of the referendum, and it needed support from 50 per cent of those eligible to vote, about 20 million voters.

Because it was not expected that these numbers would be achieved, the government and the parliament began to prepare for further parliamentary discussions on the issue. These talks were also affected by the notification that any laws giving effect to the expropriation would have the intended effect of changing the constitution, meaning that they would require a two-thirds majority. Only a law that could expect the support of parts of the SPD, on the left, and parts of the DNVP, on the right, would have had a chance of succeeding.

It was expected that on 20 June 1926 the number of those in favour of expropriation without compensation would be higher. There were a number of reasons to expect that: because the vote in June would be decisive, greater mobilization of the voters on the left could be expected than in the March petition. The failure of all previous attempts at parliamentary compromise had lent support to those voices in the bourgeois parties that were also in favour of such a radical change. For example, youth organizations of the Centre Party and the DDP called for a "yes" vote. The DDP was split into supporters and opponents. The party leadership, therefore, left it to the DDP supporters to choose which side they would vote for. In addition, those organizations that represented the interests of the victims of inflation, now recommended voting for the expropriation.

Two additional factors put pressure on the opponents of the referendum, who had united on 15 April 1926 under the umbrella of the "Working Group Against the Referendum". As with the petition, the opponents of the referendum included right-wing associations and parties, agricultural and industrial interest groups, the churches, and the Vereinigung Deutscher Hofkammern, the association representing the interests of the former federal Princes:

- Firstly, the home of Heinrich Class, the leader of the Pan-German League, had been searched at the behest of the Prussian Interior Ministry. This revealed comprehensive plans for a coup. Similar evidence was turned up by searches involving his employees.
- Secondly, on 7 June 1926, excerpts of a letter which Hindenburg had written to Friedrich Wilhelm von Loebell, the president of the Reich Citizens' Council (Reichsbürgerrat), on 22 May 1926 were published. In this letter, Hindenburg called the plebiscite a "grave injustice" that showed a "deplorable lack of sense of tradition" and "gross ingratitude". It was "contrary to the principles of morality and justice". For the background to the correspondence, see Jung 1996, p. 927–940. Hindenburg tolerated the use of his negative words on posters by the expropriation opponents, which laid him open to the accusation that he was not aloof from party politics but was openly supporting the conservatives.

The expropriation opponents increased their efforts. Their core message was the claim that the proponents of the referendum were not just interested in the expropriation of the princes' property but intended the abolition of private property as such. The opponents called for a boycott of the referendum. This made sense from their perspective because each abstention (and each invalid vote) had the same effect as a "no" vote. The call for a boycott practically turned the secret ballot into an open one.

The opponents of the referendum mobilized substantial financial resources. The DNVP, for instance, deployed significantly more money in the agitation against the referendum than in the election campaigns of 1924 and more than in the general election of 1928. The funds for the agitation against the referendum came from contributions from the dynastic families, from industrialists, and from other donations.

As with the petition, especially east of the Elbe, farm workers were threatened with economic and personal sanctions if they participated in the referendum. There were attempts to scare small farmers by saying that it was not just about the expropriation of the princes' property but about livestock, farm equipment and land for all farms. Also, on 20 June 1926, the opponents held festivals with free beer keep people from voting.

The National Socialist German Workers' Party (NSDAP) exacerbated the populist dimension by demanding not the expropriation of the Princes' property but of Jewish immigrants' who had entered Germany since 1 August 1914. Initially, the left wing of the NSDAP, centered on Gregor Strasser, favoured the Nazis supporting the expropriation campaign, but Adolf Hitler rejected this demand at the meeting of the party leadership in Bamberg on 14 February 1926. Alluding to a speech by the Emperor in August 1914, he said, "For us there are now no princes, only Germans."

On 20 June 1926, of the approximately 39.7 million voters, nearly 15.6 million (39.3 per cent) cast their vote. About 14.5 million voted "yes"; about 0.59 million voted "no" . About 0.56 million votes were invalid The referendum therefore failed because less than the required 50 per cent of voters participated.

The expropriation without compensation had again been supported in the strongholds of the Centre Party. The same was true of large urban electoral districts. There too, the referendum had appealed to voters from the middle-class, national, conservative spectrum. Although in some cases, there were more votes cast than in the petition for a referendum, the support from the agricultural parts of the country (especially east of the Elbe) was again below average. The participation rate was also low in Bavaria, compared to other regions, despite the overall increase compared with the petition.

== After the referendum ==
No lasting trend to the left was associated with this result despite fears by some opponents of the expropriation and hoped for by some sections of the SPD and the KPD. Many traditional voters of the DNVP, for example, voted for the referendum only as a response DNVP's broken electoral promise of 1924 to provide reasonable compensation for inflation losses. Also, the permanent ideological conflicts between the SPD and KPD had also not been overcome by virtue of the joint petition and referendum campaigns. On 22 June 1926, the Communist Party newspaper Die Rote Fahne (The Red Flag) had claimed that the Social Democratic leaders had deliberately sabotaged the referendum campaign. Four days later, the Central Committee of Communist Party were saying that the Social Democrats were now secretly supporting the "shameless robbery" by the princes.

That assertion referred to the SPD's willingness to continue seeking a legislative resolution to the dispute in the Reichstag. For two reasons, the SPD expected considerable opportunities for influencing a legislative solution at the national level, even if such a law needed a two-thirds majority. First, they interpreted the referendum as strong support for social democratic positions. Second, Wilhelm Marx's (third) government was flirting with the idea of including the SPD in the government, in other words with the formation of a grand coalition, which would necessitate first entertaining social democratic demands. However, after lengthy negotiations, the changes to the government bill for compensation of the princes were finally rejected: there was to be no strengthening of the lay element in the Reich special courts; the SPD suggestion that the judges of that court should be elected by the Reichstag was also rejected; there was also no provision for resumption of property disputes that had already been settled but on unfavourable terms for the states.

On 1 July 1926, the leadership of the SPD parliamentary party nevertheless tried to convince the SPD parliamentarians to accept the bill, which was to be voted on in the Reichstag the next day. But they refused. This price for being included in a new national government was too high for most of them. They could also not be convinced by the arguments of the Prussian government under Otto Braun and the words of the Socialist Group of the Prussian Landtag, who also wanted a national law, so as to be able to settle the disputes with the Hohenzollerns on this basis.

On 2 July 1926, the parliamentary parties of the SPD and the DNVP both stated their reasons for rejecting the bill, and the bill was withdrawn by the government without a vote.

The individual states now had to reach agreements with the princely houses by direct negotiations. The position of the states was protected up to the end of June 1927 by a so-called blocking law, which prohibited attempts by the royal houses to pursue claims against the states through the civil courts. In Prussia, agreement was reached on 6 October 1926: a draft agreement was signed by the State of Prussia and the Hohenzollern Plenipotentiary, Friedrich von Berg. Of the total seized assets, approximately 63,000 ha went to the State of Prussia; the royal house, including all ancillary lines, retained approximately 96,000 ha Prussia also took ownership of a large number of palaces and other properties. From the point of view of the state government, the settlement was better than what had been envisaged in October 1925. In the vote on 15 October 1926, the SPD abstained even if the majority of the deputies inwardly opposed it. They thought the return of assets to the Hohenzollerns went too far. However, a clear "no" vote in plenary session seemed inexpedient because Braun had threatened to resign if that happened. The SPD's abstention opened the way for the ratification of the agreement by the Prussian parliament. The KPD was unable to prevent the bill being passed although there were tumultuous scenes in the parliament during the second reading on 12 October 1926.

Even before the legal settlement between Prussia and the Hohenzollerns, most disputes between the states and the royal families had been settled amicably. However, after October 1926, some states were still in dispute with the royal houses: Thuringia Hesse, Mecklenburg-Schwerin, Mecklenburg-Strelitz, and especially Lippe. Some of these negotiations were to last for many years. A total of 26 agreements for the settlement of these property disputes were concluded between the states and the royal houses. According to these agreements, cost-incurring objects, including palaces, buildings and gardens, usually went to the state. Income-generating properties, such as forests or valuable land, mainly went to the royal houses. In many cases, collections, theatres, museums, libraries and archives were incorporated in newly established foundations and were thus made accessible to the public. On the basis of these agreements, the state also took over the court officials and servants, including the associated pension obligations. Generally, appanages and civil lists: the part of the budget once used for the head of state and his court, were scrapped in exchange for one-off compensation.

During the time of the presidential governments, there were a number of attempts in the Reichstag, both from the KPD and the SPD, to revisit the issue of expropriation or reduction in the Princes' compensation. They were intended as a political response to the trend to reduce salaries. None of these initiatives generated much political attention. The Communist Party proposals were rejected out of hand by the other parties. SPD proposals were at best referred to the law committee. There, nothing came of them, partly because there were repeated premature dissolutions of the Reichstag.

On 1 February 1939, after initial hesitation, the Nazis passed a law which enabled settled agreements to be revisited. On the whole, however, this instrument was more a preventive measure or threat, intended as a defence against any claims of the royal families against the state (there were a number in the early days of the Third Reich). The threat of a completely new settlement to the benefit of the Nazi state was intended to suppress any complaints and court cases once and for all. It was not intended to include the agreements in the policy of Gleichschaltung.

== Assessment by historians ==
The Marxist–Leninist historiography of the GDR viewed the expropriation and the actions of the workers' parties primarily from a perspective similar to that of the Communist Party of the time. The united front strategy of the Communist Party was interpreted as the correct step in the class struggle. The plebiscitary projects were "the most powerful unified action of the German working class in the period of relative stabilization of capitalism". It was the SPD leadership and the leadership of the free trade unions that were attacked, particularly where they sought a compromise with the bourgeois parties. The attitude of the leaders of the SPD and the Free Trade Unions, it was said, significantly hampered the development of the popular movement against the Princes.

Otmar Jung's post-doctoral dissertation of 1985 is the most comprehensive study of the Princes' expropriation to date. In the first part, he analyzes the historical, economic and legal aspects of all property disputes for each of the German states. This analysis takes up 500 pages of the more than 1200 pages. Jung uses this approach in order to counter the danger of prematurely assuming that the Prussian solution was the typical one. In the second part, Jung details the events. His intention is to show that the absence of elements of direct democracy in the constitution of the Federal Republic of Germany cannot legitimately be justified by "bad experience" in the Weimar Republic as is often done. On closer examination, the Weimar experience was different. According to Jung, the popular legislative initiative of 1926 was a laudable attempt to complement the parliamentary system where it was not able to provide a solution: in the question of a clear and final separation of the assets of the state and the former Princes. Here, the referendum was a legitimate problem-solving process. One of the results of the campaign, according to Jung, was that it brought to light technical defects in the referendum process, for instance because abstentions and "no" votes had exactly the same effect. By correcting misconceptions about elements of direct democracy in the Weimar Republic, Jung wants to pave the way for a less prejudiced discussion of elements of direct democracy in the present.

Thomas Kluck examines the positions of German Protestantism. He makes it clear that the majority of theologians and publicists of the Protestant Churches rejected the expropriation of the Princes. The reason given was often Christian precepts. Often, the rejections also exhibited a backward-looking nostalgia for the seemingly harmonious times of the Empire and a desire for a new, strong leadership. Kluck contends that conflicts involving the present, such as the controversy about the property of the former ruling houses, were often interpreted by German Protestantism in terms of demonology: behind these conflicts were seen machinations of the devil that would tempt people to sin. Alongside the devil as a malevolent mastermind, national-conservative elements of Protestantism branded Jews as the cause and beneficiaries of political conflicts. Such an attitude was wide open to the ideology of National Socialism and thus gave it theological support. This ideological support, he claimed, was a basis for Protestant guilt.

Ulrich Schüren stresses that in 1918 the question of the expropriation of the former rulers could have been settled without any major problems, legitimised by the power of the revolution. To that extent, this was a failure of the revolution. Despite its failure, the referendum, had a significant indirect effect. After 20 June 1926, the referendum increased the willingness to compromise in the conflict between Prussia and the House of Hohenzollern so that it proved possible to conclude an agreement as early as October. Schüren also makes it clear that there were signs of erosion in the bourgeois parties. Mainly affected were the DDP and the DNVP, but also the Centre Party. Schüren suspects that the increasing lack of cohesion that was manifesting itself among the bourgeois parties contributed to the rise of National Socialism after 1930.

A key theme in the assessment by non-Marxist historians is the question of whether the referendum debates put a strain on the Weimar compromise between the moderate labour movement and the moderate middle class. In this context, the focus is on the policy of the SPD. Peter Longerich notes that it was not possible to convert the relative success of the referendum into political capital. In his opinion, the referendum also hampered cooperation between the SPD and the bourgeois parties. This aspect is stressed most by Heinrich August Winkler. It is understandable, he says, that the SPD leadership supported the referendum so as not to lose touch with the Social Democratic base. But the price was very high. The SPD, he says, found it difficult to go back to the familiar path of class compromise after 20 June 1926. The debate about the expropriation of the former rulers shows the dilemma of the SPD in the Weimar Republic. When they showed themselves willing to compromise with the bourgeois parties, they ran the risk of losing supporters and voters to the Communist Party. If the SPD stressed class positions and joined in alliances with the Communist Party, they alienated the moderate bourgeois parties and tolerated that they sought allies on the right of the political spectrum who were not interested in the continued existence of the republic. The referendum had weakened, not strengthened, confidence in the parliamentary system and had created expectations that could not be fulfilled. In Winkler's view, the resulting frustration could be only destabilising for representative democracy. Winkler's position is clearly distinct from that of Otmar Jung.

Hans Mommsen on the other hand, draws attention to mentality and generational conflicts in the republic. In his opinion, the referendum of 1926 revealed significant differences and deep divisions between the generations in Germany. A large proportion, perhaps even the majority, of Germans had been on the side of the supporters of the republic in this question and had supported the referendum as a protest against the backward-looking loyalty of bourgeois leaders. Mommsen also draws attention to the mobilization of anti-Bolshevik and anti-Semitic sentiments by the opponents of expropriation. This mobilization anticipated the constellation in which after 1931 "the remains of the parliamentary system would be smashed.
