= Life Begins Tomorrow =

1933 film

- Directed by: Werner Hochbaum
- Written by: Carl Behr
- Produced by: Emil Unfried
- Starring: Erich Haußmann; Hilde von Stolz; Harry Frank
- Cinematography: Herbert Körner
- Music by: Hanson Milde-Meissner
- Production company: Ethos-Film
- Release date: 4 August 1933
- Running time: 89 minutes
- Country: Germany
- Language: German

Life Begins Tomorrow (German: Morgen beginnt das Leben) is a 1933 German drama film directed by Werner Hochbaum and starring Erich Haußmann, Hilde von Stolz and Harry Frank.

After working on the film, the left-wing Hochbaum emigrated to Austria due to the coming to power of the Nazis, although he did return to make films for the regime.

The film's sets were designed by Gustav A. Knauer and Alexander Mügge.

== Plot ==
A cafe violinist is released from prison. His neighbors' whispered gossip and the violinist's own flashbacks reveal that he was imprisoned for murder. Which begs questions such as: Has his wife, a waitress, begun a love affair while he was in jail? And will this give the violinist another temptation to murder?

== Artistic devices ==
This story... is a sort of anthology of 1920s International Style devices: canted angles, rapid montages, City Symphony passages, flamboyant camera movements, multiple-image superimpositions, and huge close-ups of faces, hands, and objects. The work on sound is no less ambitious, with voice-overs, sound motifs (a carousel, a canary’s call-and-response to a chiming doorbell), offscreen dialogue, and harsh auditory montages of traffic and city life. Everything from Impressionist subjective-focus point-of-view to Expressionist shadow work comes into play.

— David Bordwell, https://www.davidbordwell.net/blog/2014/06/

== Cast ==
- Erich Haußmann as Robert
- Hilde von Stolz as Marie
- Harry Frank as Stehgeiger
- Alfred Beierle
- Eta Klingenberg
- Gustav Püttjer
- Edith Schollwer as Kellnerin
- Walter von Lennep as Sänger
- Arthur Wilke

== Bibliography ==
- Bock, Hans-Michael; Bergfelder, Tim, eds. (2009). The Concise Cinegraph: Encyclopaedia of German Cinema. New York: Berghahn Books. ISBN 978-1-57181-655-9.
