= Harry Frank =

German actor (1896–1947)

- Born: 15 October 1896; Berlin, German Empire
- Died: 12 December 1947 (aged 51); Berlin, Germany
- Occupation: Film actor
- Years active: 1919–1947

Harry Frank (15 October 1896 – 12 December 1947) was a German actor.

== Selected filmography ==
- In den Goldfeldern von Nevada (1920)
- Das wandernde Bild (1920)
- The Wandering Image (1920)
- Four Around a Woman (1921)
- The Passion of Inge Krafft (1921)
- Marizza (1922)
- The Girl Without a Homeland (1927)
- Escape from Hell (1928)
- The Case of Prosecutor M (1928)
- Give Me Life (1928)
- Mikosch Comes In (1928)
- Pawns of Passion (1928)
- Almenrausch and Edelweiss (1928)
- High Treason (1929)
- The Great Longing (1930)
- The Shot in the Sound Film Studio (1930)
- Rag Ball (1930)
- The Tiger Murder Case (1930)
- The Rhineland Girl (1930)
- Madame Bluebeard (1931)
- Kampf um Blond (1932)
- Cavaliers of the Kurfürstendamm (1932)
- Wehe, wenn er losgelassen (1932)
- Life Begins Tomorrow (1933)
- The Hymn of Leuthen (1933)
- The Girlfriend of a Big Man (1934)
- What Am I Without You (1934)
- Everything for a Woman (1935)
- Black Fighter Johanna (1934)
- The Valiant Navigator (1935)
- Don't Lose Heart, Suzanne! (1935)
- The Night With the Emperor (1936)
- The Dreamer (1936)
- The Tiger of Eschnapur (1938)
- A Waltz with You (1943)
- Raid (1947)
