= NKVD special camp Nr. 7 =

NKVD special camp that operated in Weesow and Sachsenhausen

Coordinates: 52°45′57″N 13°15′51″E

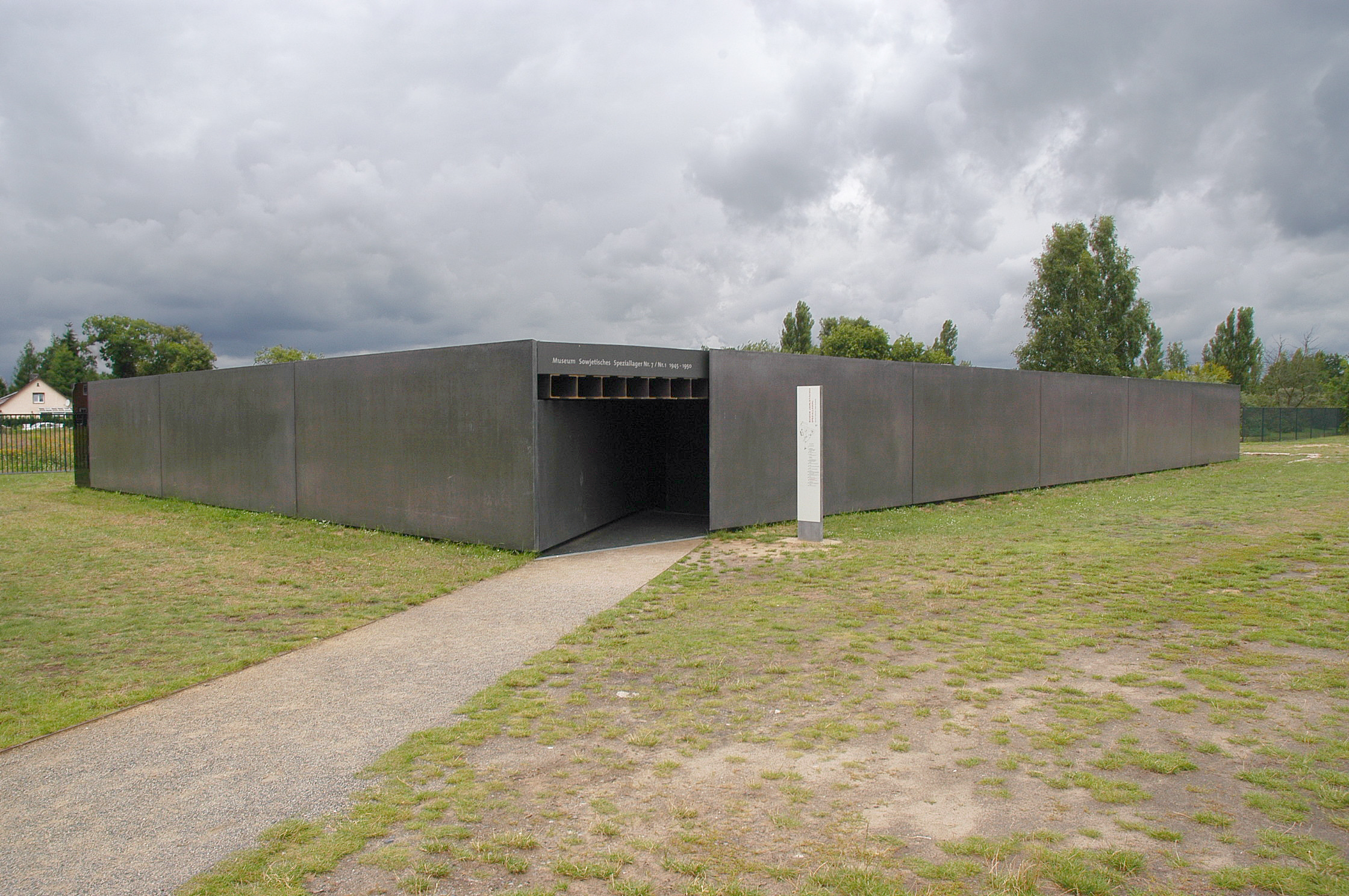
Museum NKVD special camp Nr. 7, Sachsenhausen

NKVD special camp Nr. 7 was a NKVD special camp that operated in Weesow until August 1945 and in Sachsenhausen from August 1945 until the spring of 1950. It was used by the Soviet occupying forces to detain those viewed as enemies of the people by the Soviet regime.

In August 1945, the Special Camp Nr. 7 was moved to Sachsenhausen, the area of the former Nazi Sachsenhausen concentration camp. Under the NKVD, Nazi functionaries were held in the camp, as were political prisoners and inmates sentenced by the Soviet Military Tribunal. By 1948, Sachsenhausen, now renamed Special Camp No. 1, was the largest of four special camps in the Soviet occupation zone. The 60,000 people interned over five years included 6,000 German officers transferred from Western Allied camps.

After the fall of East Germany it was possible to do excavations in the former camps. In Sachsenhausen the bodies of 12,500 victims were found, mostly children, adolescents and elderly people.

By the time the camp closed in the spring of 1950, at least 12,000 had died of malnutrition and disease.

== Notable Inmates ==
- Heinrich George, actor (1893–1946)
- Hans Heinze, psychiatrist and eugenicist (Aktion T4) (1895–1983)
- Giwi Margwelaschwili, author (1927–2020)
- Karl August Nerger, Admiral (1875–1947)
- Otto Nerz, football coach and SA officer (1892–1949)
- Eduard Stadtler (1886–1945)
- Ernst Schlange (1888–1947)
- Emil Unfried (1892–1949)
