= Edmund Bartłomiejczyk =

Polish painter

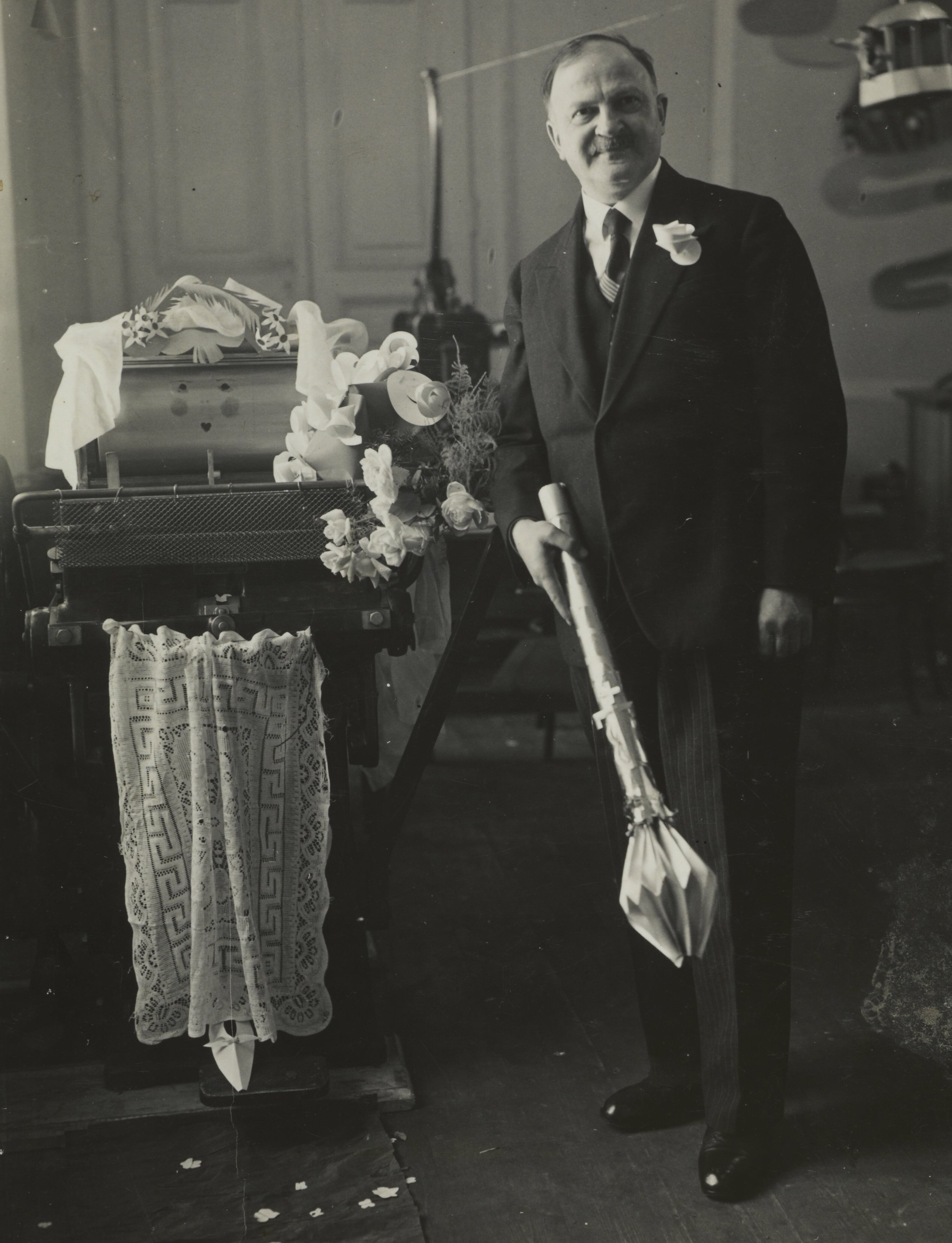
- Edmund Bartłomiejczyk in 1936
- Born: 5 November 1885; Warsaw, Poland
- Died: 2 September 1950 (aged 64); Warsaw, Poland
- Occupation: Painter

Edmund Bartłomiejczyk (5 November 1885 – 2 September 1950) was a Polish painter. His work was part of the painting event in the art competition at the 1932 Summer Olympics.
