= Tite Margwelaschwili =

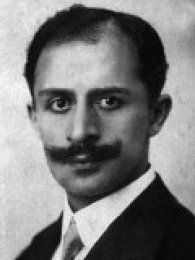

Tite Margwelaschwili (Georgian: ტიტე მარგველაშვილი, German: Titus von Margwelaschwili) (1891–1946) was a Georgian philosopher and writer. He studied at the University of Leipzig and did a doctor's degree in history at the University Halle-Wittenberg in 1914. His career in Georgia was interrupted by the Soviet invasion of the Democratic Republic of Georgia in 1921.

A member of the Georgian National Democratic Party and a staunch opponent of the Bolshevik regime, he emigrated to Germany and quickly emerged as one of the leaders of Georgian political emigration, being elected a chairman of a sizeable Georgian émigré colony in Berlin. He lectured philosophy and Oriental studies at the Frederick William University of Berlin and worked for the Georgian émigré newspaper The Caucasus. He suffered a family tragedy in June 1933, when his wife Mariam committed suicide because she was homesick.

After the end of World War II he lived in Berlin-Wilmersdorf in the British sector of Berlin. In December 1945 he was decoyed to East Berlin by Soviet NKVD agents who used the notable philosopher Shalva Nutsubidze as an enticement. Arrested during his visit to Nutsubidze, Margwelaschwili was detained in a prison in the eastern part of the city, interrogated and tortured, deported to Tbilisi and shot as a traitor in August 1946. His son, Giwi, subsequently a conspicuous German-Georgian writer, was placed in a Soviet Special Camp at Sachsenhausen for 18 months.

== Works ==
- Titus von Margwelaschwili: Colchis, Iberien und Albanien um die Wende des 1. Jahrhunderts v. Chr. mit besonderer Berücksichtigung Strabo's. Phil. Diss., Halle 1914
- Tite Margvelashvili: Der Mann in Pantherfell. in: Georgica, London 1936
