= Givi Margvelashvili =

Georgian philosopher (1927–2020)

Giwi Margwelaschwili გივი მარგველაშვილი
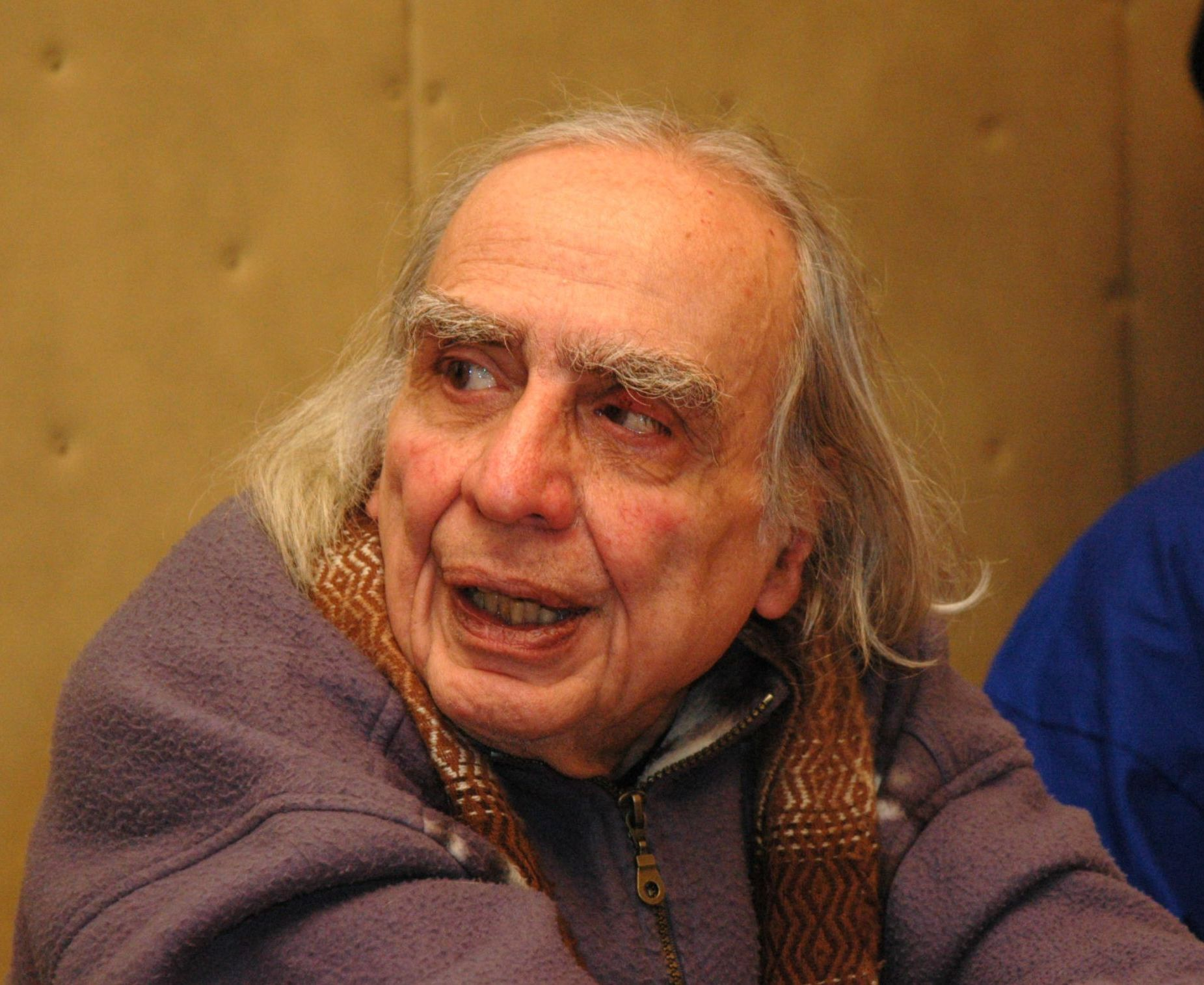
- Giwi Margwelaschwili in Berlin in 2008
- Born: 14 December 1927; Berlin, Prussia, Weimar Republic
- Died: 13 March 2020 (aged 92); Tbilisi, Georgia
- Education: Tbilisi State University
- Occupations: Philosopher; Novelist; Academic teacher
- Organizations: Georgian Academy of Sciences; International PEN; University of Bamberg
- Awards: Goethe Medal; Kunstpreis Berlin

Giwi Margwelaschwili (Georgian: გივი მარგველაშვილი Givi Margvelashvili; 14 December 1927 – 13 March 2020) was a German-Georgian writer and philosopher. Born in Berlin to anti-communist Georgian refugees, he was raised as a German. After World War II, his father and he were abducted by the Soviet NKVD secret police. His father, Tite Margwelaschwili was shot by the NKVD and Giwi was imprisoned in the former Sachsenhausen concentration camp for 18 months and then, speaking neither Russian nor Georgian, he was released to Tbilisi, Georgian SSR, where he had relatives. He learned both languages and studied English, working as a language teacher. He wrote novels and philosophy books in German. He returned to Germany and became a German citizen in 1994. In 2011, he moved back to Tbilisi again.

== Biography ==
He was born in Berlin, the son and second child of the notable Georgian intellectual Tite Margwelaschwili, who had moved to Germany after the Red Army invasion of Georgia in 1921 and was chairman of the Georgian political emigre organization in Berlin from 1941. His mother, Mariam, committed suicide when he was five years old. Due to Allied bombing, he attended several different gymnasium schools in Berlin during 1934 to 1946, and participated in the anti-Nazi youth counterculture Swing Kids. He went to jazz clubs and loved swing.

Shortly before the end of World War II, he and his father escaped from Occupied Germany to Italy where his sister, Elisabeth, lived. While she remained there, the father and son returned to Berlin. In December 1945, Giwi and his father were abducted by the Soviet secret police NKVD. After eight months of interrogations, his father was shot as a traitor. Giwi was interned in Hohenschönhausen, then in the former Sachsenhausen concentration camp. The location appears in his works only in the diminutive, "Sachsenhäuschen". He explains the absence of references to it in his writings as, because he left the terrible things he experienced there behind. After 18 months in the camp, he was released, not to Berlin, but to his relatives in Tbilisi.

Margwelaschwili then had to learn Georgian and Russian. He also studied English at the Tbilisi State University, teaching English and German at the Tbilisi Institute of Foreign Languages from 1954 to 1970. During the 1950s, he wrote his first novels and philosophic writings on phenomenology.

For the first time since 1946, in 1969, he was allowed to travel to West Germany as a translator for the Rustaveli Theatre. In 1970, his first scientific work about "The role of the language in Heidegger's philosophy" was published. In 1971, he was appointed to the Institute of Philosophy at the Georgian Academy of Sciences and began philosophical publications. He visited dissident and songwriter Wolf Biermann in Berlin. Due to that contact he was prohibited from leaving the Soviet Union until 1987. In 1972, he met Heinrich Böll, a Nobel laureate in literature from West Germany, who was impressed by his unpublished autobiography, Kapitän Wakusch. Böll tried to help him get a passport, but was not successful.

With the help of civil rights activist Ekkehard Maaß in 1990, he settled in Berlin and was naturalized as a German citizen in 1994. In 1991, his first autobiographical work, Muzal. Ein georgischer Roman, was published in Germany. Several books followed, including novels, philosophical commentaries on Classical authors, and poems, which quickly won national and international acclaim. Nevertheless, most of his work remained unpublished.

In 1995, he was awarded the Literature Prize of Brandenburg. He became a member of the International PEN and received a scholarship from the president of Germany. The University of Bamberg appointed him professor for poetry. The Academy of Arts, Berlin, decorated him with the Kunstpreis Berlin for his life's work. In 2006, the Goethe Institute awarded him the prestigious Goethe Medal. He held an honorary doctorate from Tbilisi State University. He moved back to Tbilisi in 2011.

In 1970, he married the author and German philologist, Naira Gelashvili. Their daughter, Anna, also is a German philologist. Margwelaschwili died in Tbilisi on 13 March 2020.

== Works ==
Many of his works were re-issued by the Verbrecher Verlag.

- Margwelaschwili, Giwi: Kapitän Wakusch: autobiographischer Roman. vol. 1 In Deuxiland. Südverlag, Konstanz 1991, ISBN 3-87800-012-X
- Margwelaschwili, Giwi: Kapitän Wakusch: autobiographischer Roman. vol. 2 Sachsenhäuschen. Südverlag, Konstanz 1992, ISBN 3-87800-013-8
- Margwelaschwili, Giwi: Kapitani Vakusi. Kavkasiuri Saxli, T'bilisi N.N., ISBN 99928-71-67-9
- Margwelaschwili, Giwi: Die große Korrektur, vol. 1 Das böse Kapitel: Roman. Rütten & Loening, Berlin 1991, ISBN 3-352-00418-8
- Margwelaschwili, Giwi: Muzal: ein georgischer Roman. Insel-Verlag, Frankfurt a.M./Leipzig 1991, ISBN 3-458-16192-9
- Magwelaschwili, Giwi: Zuschauerräume: ein historisches Märchen. Autoren-Kollegium, Berlin 1991
- Margwelaschwili, Giwi: Der ungeworfene Handschuh: ontotextologische Versuche zur Abwehr von Schicksalsschlägen in Buch- und Gedichtweltbezirken. Rütten & Loening, Berlin 1992, ISBN 3-352-00437-4
- Margwelaschwili, Giwi: Leben im Ontotext: Poesie – Poetik – Philosophie. Federchen-Verlag, Neubrandenburg N.N. [1993], ISBN 3-910170-10-2
- Margwelaschwili, Giwi: Gedichtwelten – Realwelten. Arbeitsbereich Neuere Deutsche Literaturwissenschaft Otto-Friedrich-Universität Bamberg, Bamberg 1994
