= Eduard Stadtler =

German journalist and politician

Eduard Stadtler (17 February 1886 in Hagenau – 5 October 1945 in NKVD special camp Nr. 7) was a German journalist and nationalist politician who formed the Anti-Bolshevist League in 1918. Stadtler had begun advocating the creation of a "national socialist" dictatorship in 1918.

Stadtler had been a member of the German National People's Party (DNVP) until 1933 when he defected to the Nazi Party weeks prior to the DNVP being dissolved.

After the Second World War ended, he was arrested by the Soviet NKVD and died in the NKVD special camp Nr. 7.
