= Sachsenhausen (Oranienburg) =

German district of the town Oranienburg

Coordinates: 52°45′16″N 13°14′13″E

Sachsenhausen (German pronunciation: [zaksn̩ˈhaʊzn̩]) is a district on the Havel River in the north of the town Oranienburg, 35 kilometres north of Berlin in Germany. As of December 2005, it had a population of 2,735. The district's name means 'Houses of the Saxons'.

== History ==
The area became notorious for the nearby site of the Nazi concentration camp, also called Sachsenhausen, which operated from 1936 to 1945.

For five years after World War II the Soviets used the facility as Special Camp No. 7 (later Soviet Special Camp No. 1).
