= List of German films of 1924 =

This is a list of the most notable films produced in the Cinema of Germany in 1924.

Title	Director	Cast	Genre	Notes
1924
25 Jahre Zeppelin-Luftschiff-Fahrt 1900–1925			documentary	
Allmutter Natur	Gertrud David		documentary	
Allerlei Bilder aus Bethel	Gertrud David		documentary	
Arabella	Karl Grune	Mae Marsh, Alfons Fryland	Drama	
Around a Million	Joseph Delmont	Harry Hardt, Dary Holm, Wilhelm Diegelmann	Silent	
Im Banne des Meeres	Edgar S. Ziesemer		documentary	
Battle of the Butterflies	Franz Eckstein	Asta Nielsen, Reinhold Schünzel	Silent	
The Blonde Hannele	Franz Seitz	Maria Mindzenty, Carl de Vogt, Helena Makowska	Silent	
The Brigantine of New York	Hans Werckmeister	Hilde Jennings, Lotte Neumann	Silent	
By Order of Pompadour	Frederic Zelnik	Lya Mara, Frida Richard, Hans Albers	Historical	
Carlos and Elisabeth	Richard Oswald	Conrad Veidt, Eugen Klöpfer	Historical	
Claire	Robert Dinesen	Lya De Putti, Eduard von Winterstein, Theodor Loos	Silent	
Colibri	Victor Janson	Ossi Oswalda, Bruno Kastner	Silent	
Comedians of Life	Georg Jacoby	Elga Brink, Georg Alexander	Silent	
Comedy of the Heart	Rochus Gliese	Lil Dagover, Nigel Barrie	Romance	
Countess Donelli	Georg Wilhelm Pabst	Paul Hansen, Henny Porten	Drama	
The Creature	Siegfried Philippi	Charlotte Ander, Alfons Fryland, Erich Kaiser-Titz	Silent	
Dangerous Clues	Harry Piel	Harry Piel, Henrik Galeen, Dary Holm	Thriller	
A Dangerous Game	Harry Piel	Harry Piel, Hermann Leffler, Claire Rommer	Adventure	
Darling of the King	Heinz Schall	Ruth Weyher, Elisabeth Pinajeff	Silent	
Debit and Credit	Carl Wilhelm	Hans Brausewetter, Paul Graetz, Mady Christians	Drama	
Decameron Nights	Herbert Wilcox	Lionel Barrymore, Ivy Duke, Werner Krauss	Historical	Co-production with the UK
Die Ehrengedenkfeier für die toten Helden			documentary	
Doctor Wislizenus	Hanns Kobe	Charlotte Ander, Fritz Kortner	Silent	
The Doomed	Eugen Illés	Bernd Aldor, Sascha Gura, Erich Kaiser-Titz	Drama	
A Dream of Happiness	Paul L. Stein	Harry Liedtke, Agnes Esterházy	Silent	
Dudu, a Human Destiny	Rudolf Meinert	Alfred Abel, Maly Delschaft	Silent	
The Enchantress	William Karfiol	Olga Chekhova, Charlotte Ander	Drama	
The Evangelist	Holger-Madsen	Paul Hartmann, Hanni Weisse, Elisabeth Bergner	Drama	
The Fake Emir	Harry Piel	Harry Piel, Hermann Leffler, Claire Rommer	Adventure	
Fever for Heights	Gernot Bock-Stieber	Sascha Gura, Hanni Reinwald, Erich Kaiser-Titz	Silent	
The Final Mask	Emmerich Hanus	Margarete Lanner, Wilhelm Diegelmann	Drama	
The Four Marriages of Matthias Merenus	Werner Funck	Grete Reinwald, Rudolf Biebrach	Comedy	
The Gallows Bride	Josef Berger	Grete Reinwald, Leopold von Ledebur	Silent	
The Game of Love	Guido Parish	Marcella Albani, Alfred Abel, Carl de Vogt	Silent	
Garragan	Ludwig Wolff	Carmel Myers, Julanne Johnston	Silent	
Gentleman on Time	Karl Gerhardt	Carlo Aldini, Grete Reinwald	Silent	
The Girl from Capri	Frederic Zelnik	Lya Mara, Ulrich Bettac	Comedy	
Girls You Don't Marry	Géza von Bolváry	Ellen Kürti, Karl Beckersachs, Paul Otto	Comedy	
Gobseck	Preben J. Rist	Otto Gebühr, Clementine Plessner	Drama	
The Grand Duke's Finances	Friedrich Wilhelm Murnau	Alfred Abel, Mady Christians	Comedy	
The Great Unknown	Willi Wolff	Lydia Potechina, Ellen Richter	Drama	
Guillotine	Guido Parish	Willy Fritsch, Marcella Albani, Hans Albers	Drama	
The Heart of Lilian Thorland	Wolfgang Neff	Esther Carena, Evi Eva, Hermann Picha	Silent	
Heart of Stone	Fred Sauer	Fritz Schulz, Grete Reinwald	Silent	
Die Heilsarmee	Gertrud David		documentary	
Helena	Manfred Noa	Vladimir Gajdarov, Albert Steinrück	Epic Drama	Released in two parts.
Die Hermannschlacht	Leo König	Harry Liedtke, Mia Pankau	Drama	
Hoffnungsthal, eine Zuflucht für Hoffnungslose	Gertrud David		documentary	
Horrido	Johannes Meyer	Robert Leffler, Rudolf Forster	Silent	
The House by the Sea	Fritz Kaufmann	Asta Nielsen, Gregori Chmara	Silent	
Hunted Men	Erich Schönfelder	Lucy Doraine, Johannes Riemann, Hans Albers	Silent	
Husbands or Lovers	Paul Czinner	Elisabeth Bergner, Emil Jannings, Conrad Veidt	Drama	
I Had a Comrade	Hans Behrendt	Otto Gebühr, Gertrud Eysoldt	Silent	
In the Name of the King	Erich Schönfelder	Dagny Servaes, Walter Rilla	Silent	
Inge Larsen	Hans Steinhoff	Henny Porten, Hans Albers, Ressel Orla	Drama	
Kaddish	Adolf E. Licho	Lia Eibenschütz, Ilka Grüning, Rudolf Lettinger	Drama	
Der Länderkampf Deutschland-Italien im Duisburger Stadion			documentary	
The Last Laugh	Friedrich Wilhelm Murnau	Emil Jannings, Maly Delschaft	Drama	
Leap Into Life	Johannes Guter	Xenia Desni, Walter Rilla	Drama	
The Lion of Venice	Paul L. Stein	Olaf Fjord, Grete Reinwald, Hanni Weisse	Silent	
The Little Duke	Rudolf Walther-Fein	Paul Biensfeldt, Lia Eibenschütz	Silent	
Lord Reginald's Derby Ride	Arthur Teuber	Ralph Arthur Roberts, Fritz Kampers	Comedy	
Love Is the Power of Women	Erich Engel	Fern Andra, Fred Immler	Drama	
The Love Letters of Baroness S	Henrik Galeen	Mia May, Memo Benassi	Drama	
Love of Life	Georg Asagaroff	Georg H. Schnell, Olga Gzovskaya, Helena Makowska	Silent	
Jungs holt fast! Mit unserer Reichsmarine in der Ostsee	Kurt Friedrich		documentary	
The Malay Junk	Max Obal	Ernst Reicher, Alexandra Sorina	Crime	
Malva	Robert Dinesen	Lya De Putti, Hans Adalbert Schlettow	Silent	
Man Against Man	Hans Steinhoff	Alfred Abel, Mady Christians, Tullio Carminati	Drama	
Marionettes of the Princess	Frederic Zelnik	Gertrude Welcker, Rudolf Forster, Erich Kaiser-Titz	Drama	
Maud Rockefeller's Bet	Erich Eriksen	Rita Clermont, Karl Elzer	Comedy	
The Man at Midnight	Holger-Madsen	Hella Moja, Olaf Fjord	Silent	
The Man Without Nerves	Harry Piel	Harry Piel, Dary Holm, Albert Paulig	Crime	
Michael	Carl Theodor Dreyer	Benjamin Christensen, Walter Slezak	Drama	
Mister Radio	Nunzio Malasomma	Luciano Albertini, Evi Eva	Adventure	
The Mistress of Monbijou	Frederic Zelnik	Lya Mara, Hermann Böttcher	Romance	
Modern Marriages	Hans Otto	Fritz Kortner, Helena Makowska	Comedy	
The Monk from Santarem	Lothar Mendes	Evi Eva, Walter Rilla, Vivian Gibson	Silent	
The Most Beautiful Woman in the World	Richard Eichberg	Lee Parry, Livio Pavanelli	Silent	
Mother and Child	Carl Froelich	Henny Porten, Friedrich Kayßler	Drama	
Mountain of Destiny	Arnold Fanck	Hannes Schneider, Frida Richard	Drama	
My Leopold	Heinrich Bolten-Baeckers	Walter Slezak, Käthe Haack	Comedy	
Nanon	Hanns Schwarz	Agnes Esterházy, Harry Liedtke	Historical	
Nelly, the Bride Without a Husband	Frederic Zelnik	Lya Mara, Erich Kaiser-Titz	Comedy	
The New Land	Hans Behrendt	Otto Gebühr, Reinhold Schünzel, Aud Egede-Nissen	Historical	
New Year's Eve	Lupu Pick	Eugen Klöpfer, Edith Posca	Drama	
Die Nibelungen: Siegfried (The Nibelungen: Siegfried)	Fritz Lang	Paul Richter, Margarete Schön	Fantasy	
Die Nibelungen: Kriemhilds Rache (The Nibelungen: Kriemhilds Revenge)	Fritz Lang	Paul Richter, Margarete Schön	Fantasy	
Opus III	Walter Ruttmann		Animation	Film at YouTube (links to video of Opus II through IV with modern soundtrack)
Orient	Gennaro Righelli	Maria Jacobini, Harry Liedtke, Magnus Stifter	Silent	
The Other Woman	Gerhard Lamprecht	Xenia Desni, Fritz Alberti	Drama	
The Path to God	Franz Seitz	Agnes Straub, Eduard von Winterstein	Silent	
Playing with Destiny	Siegfried Philippi	Alfred Abel, Sascha Gura, Claire Rommer	Silent	
The Power of Darkness	Conrad Wiene	Petr Sharov, Pavel Pavlov	Drama	
Prater	Peter Paul Felner	Henny Porten, Cläre Lotto	Silent	
The Prince and the Maid	Ludwig Czerny	Ada Svedin, Charles Willy Kayser	Silent	
The Radio Marriage	Wilhelm Prager	Maria Bard, Eduard von Winterstein	Silent	
Rosenmontag	Rudolf Meinert	Gerd Briese, Helga Thomas	Romance	
Rudderless	Gennaro Righelli	Maria Jacobini, Rosa Valetti	Silent	
The Sailor Perugino	Frederic Zelnik	Anton Pointner, Hans Brausewetter	Drama	
Schaffende Hände: George Grosz	Hans Cürlis		documentary	
The Secret Agent	Erich Schönfelder	Eva May, Lucie Höflich	Silent	
Set Me Free	Erich Eriksen	Grete Reinwald, Carl Auen, Anna von Palen	Silent	
Slaves of Love	Carl Boese	Cläre Lotto, Olga Engl	Drama	
Stätten und Werke der Liebe im schönen Lipperland	Gertrud David		documentary	
The Stolen Professor	Emil Justitz	Olaf Fjord, Camilla von Hollay	Silent	
Strong Winds	Reinhold Schünzel	Alwin Neuss, Harry Halm	Silent	
Symphonie diagonale	Viking Eggeling		Animation	
Taras Bulba	Vladimir Strizhevsky, Joseph N. Ermolieff	J. N. Douvan-Tarzow, Oscar Marion	Historical	
The Terror of the Sea	Franz Osten	Carl de Vogt, Helena Makowska, Cläre Lotto	Silent	
Thamar, The Child of the Mountains	Robert Dinesen	Lya De Putti, Paul Otto	Silent	
To a Woman of Honour	Rudolf Biebrach	Lucy Doraine, Georg H. Schnell, Fritz Greiner	Silent	
Tragedy in the House of Habsburg	Alexander Korda	Maria Corda, Werner Schott	Historical	
The Tragedy of a Night of Passion	Franz Osten	Carl de Vogt, John Mylong	Drama	
The Tragedy of the Dishonoured	Josef Berger	Cläre Lotto, Albert Steinrück	Drama	
Two Children	Richard Clement Hilber	Alexander Murski, Suzanne Marwille	Drama	
Two People	Hanns Schwarz	Olaf Fjord, Ágnes Esterházy	Drama	
The Voice of the Heart	Hanns Schwarz	Mary Johnson, Fritz Kampers	Drama	
Waxworks (Das Wachsfigurenkabinett)	Paul Leni	Werner Krauss, Conrad Veidt, Emil Jannings, William Dieterle, Georg John	Fantasy/Horror anthology film	Literally The Waxfigure Cabinet
Die weiße Kunst	Arnold Fanck		documentary	
Winter Storms	Otto Rippert	Carl Auen, Hans Adalbert Schlettow	Silent	
Das Wolkenphänomen in Majola (Cloud Phenomena of Majola)	Arnold Fanck		Documentary	
The Woman in Flames	Carl Boese	Asta Nielsen, Alfred Abel, Gregori Chmara	Thriller	
The Wonderful Adventure	Manfred Noa	Vilma Bánky, Georg Alexander	Silent	
Za La Mort	Emilio Ghione	Fern Andra, Emilio Ghione, Magnus Stifter	Action	Co-production with Italy
