= List of German films of 1921 =

This is a list of the most notable films produced in the Cinema of Germany in 1921.

Title	Director	Cast	Genre	Notes
1921
The Adventure of Doctor Kircheisen	Rudolf Biebrach	Lotte Neumann, Hermann Thimig	Drama	
The Adventuress of Monte Carlo	Adolf Gärtner	Ellen Richter, Anton Pointner, Eduard von Winterstein	Adventure	Released in three parts
Am Nil	Julius Pinschewer		Animation	
The Amazon	Richard Löwenbein	Eva May, Rudolf Forster, Olga Engl	Silent	
Ash Wednesday	Otto Rippert	Hella Moja, Ernst Winar, Rudolf Lettinger	Drama	
The Asian Sun	Edmund Heuberger	Victor Varconi, Colette Corder	Silent	
The Black Panther	Johannes Guter	Xenia Desni, Eugen Burg	Silent	
The Black Spider	Siegfried Philippi	Olga Engl, Hugo Flink	Horror	
The Blockhead	Lupu Pick	Max Adalbert, Eugen Rex	Silent	
The Brothers Karamazov	Carl Froelich; Dimitri Buchowetzki	Fritz Kortner, Emil Jannings	Drama	
The Bull of Olivera	Erich Schönfelder	Emil Jannings, Carl Ebert	Historical	
Bummel-Petrus	Leopold Blonder		Animation	
The Buried Self	Léo Lasko	Frederic Zelnik, Wilhelm Diegelmann	Drama	
Burning Country	Heinz Herald	Ernst Deutsch, Kurt Vespermann	Adventure	
Camera Obscura	Max Obal	Ernst Reicher, Alexander Granach	Mystery	
Children of Darkness	E. A. Dupont	Grit Hegesa, Hans Mierendorff, Sybil Smolova	Drama	Released in two parts
Circus of Life	Johannes Guter	Werner Krauss, Lydia Potechina, Rudolf Klein-Rogge	Drama	
The Convict of Cayenne	Léo Lasko	Frederic Zelnik, Loni Nest	Drama	
Count Varenne's Lover	Frederic Zelnik	Lya Mara, Johannes Riemann	Comedy	
Country Roads and the Big City	Carl Wilhelm	Fritz Kortner, Conrad Veidt	Silent	
The Courier from Lisbon	Ismar Stern	Heinrich Peer, Gustav Botz	Crime	
The Dance of Love and Happiness	Willy Zeyn	Werner Krauss, Olga Limburg, Hugo Flink	Silent	
Danton	Dimitri Buchowetzki	Emil Jannings, Werner Krauss	Historical	
A Debt of Honour	Paul L. Stein	Olaf Fønss, Gertrude Welcker	Drama	
Desire	F. W. Murnau	Conrad Veidt, Gussy Holl	Drama	
Destiny	Fritz Lang	Lil Dagover, Walter Janssen, Rudolf Klein-Rogge	Drama	
The Devil's Chains	Léo Lasko	Ressel Orla, Margarete Kupfer	Drama	
Driving Force	Zoltán Nagy	Lya De Putti, Fern Andra	Silent	
The Drums of Asia	Uwe Jens Krafft	Rudolf Lettinger, Käthe Haack, Arnold Marlé	Silent	
The Eternal Curse	Fritz Wendhausen	Charlotte Schultz, Rudolf Forster, Karl Etlinger	Drama	
The Eternal Struggle	Paul L. Stein	Lotte Neumann, Alfons Fryland, Harry Hardt	Drama	
Evelyn's Love Adventures	Richard Eichberg	Lee Parry, Aruth Wartan	Thriller	
The Experiment of Professor Mithrany	Dimitri Buchowetzki	Max Landa, Hanni Weisse, Margit Barnay	Silent	
The Fateful Day	Adolf E. Licho	Mady Christians, Ilka Grüning	Silent	
Four Around a Woman	Fritz Lang	Hermann Böttcher, Carola Toelle	Crime drama	
The Girl from Piccadilly	Frederic Zelnik	Lya Mara, Erich Kaiser-Titz	Silent	
The Golden Plague	Louis Ralph, Richard Oswald	Anita Berber, Paul Bildt, Hans Adalbert Schlettow	Thriller	
The Graveyard of the Living	Gerhard Lamprecht	Guido Herzfeld, Hanni Weisse	Silent	
Hamlet	Svend Gade, Heinz Schall	Asta Nielsen, Eduard von Winterstein	Drama	
Hannerl and Her Lovers	Felix Basch	Felix Basch, Ernst Deutsch	Comedy	
Hashish, the Paradise of Hell	Reinhard Bruck	Tilla Durieux, Fritz Kortner, Paul Hartmann	Drama	
The Haunted Castle	F. W. Murnau	Paul Hartmann, Olga Chekhova	Mystery	
Hazard	Frederik Larsen	Carola Toelle, Anton Edthofer	Drama	
Hintertreppe (The Rear Staircase)	Leopold Jessner, Paul Leni			
The House of Torment	Carl Wilhelm	Ressel Orla, Fritz Kortner, Rudolf Klein-Rhoden	Drama	
The House on the Moon	Karlheinz Martin	Fritz Kortner, Paul Graetz	Science fiction	
The Hunt for the Truth	Karl Grune	Erika Glässner, Fritz Kortner, Rudolf Forster	Drama	
Ilona	Robert Dinesen	Lya De Putti, Arnold Korff	Silent	
Im Kampf mit dem Berge	Arnold Fanck			
Impostor	Werner Funck	Paul Hartmann, Olga Chekhova	Silent	
Das indische Grabmal: Die Sendung des Yoghi (The Indian Tomb: Part I: the Mission of the Yogi)	Joe May			
The Inheritance of Tordis	Robert Dinesen	Ica von Lenkeffy, Paul Hartmann	Drama	
Island of the Dead	Carl Froelich	Lil Dagover, Bernhard Goetzke, Walter Janssen	Drama	
The Island of the Lost	Urban Gad	Alf Blütecher, Hanni Weisse, Erich Kaiser-Titz	Sci-fi	
Jiu-Jitsu – Die unsichtbare Waffe	Georg Etzien, Erich Rahn		Documentary	
Journey into the Night	F. W. Murnau	Olaf Fønss, Erna Morena, Conrad Veidt	Drama	
Kean	Rudolf Biebrach	Heinrich George, Carola Toelle	Historical	
Lady Godiva	Hubert Moest	Hedda Vernon, Eduard von Winterstein	Historical	
Lady Hamilton	Richard Oswald	Liane Haid, Conrad Veidt, Werner Krauss	Historical	
The Last Hour	Dimitri Buchowetzki	Reinhold Schünzel, Charlotte Ander, Maria Orska	Silent	
The Last Witness	Adolf Gärtner	Albert Bassermann, Elsa Bassermann, Olga Engl	Silent	
Die lebende Puppenstube	Leopold Blonder		Animation	
The Living Propeller	Richard Eichberg	Lee Parry, Aruth Wartan	Drama	
Lotte Lore	Franz Eckstein	Erna Morena, Alfred Abel, Margarete Schlegel	Historical	
The Love Affairs of Hector Dalmore	Richard Oswald	Conrad Veidt, Erna Morena, Lya De Putti	Drama	
Love and Passion	Martin Hartwig	Conrad Veidt, Maria Zelenka	Drama	
The Love Corridor	Urban Gad	Adolphe Engers, Erika Glässner	Comedy	
The Maharaja's Favourite Wife	Max Mack	Gunnar Tolnæs, Fritz Kortner, Erna Morena	Adventure	
Man Overboard	Karl Grune	Grit Hegesa, Erich Kaiser-Titz, Alfred Abel	Drama	
Memoirs of a Film Actress	Frederic Zelnik	Lya Mara, Ernst Hofmann	Silent	
Miss Beryll	Frederic Zelnik	Lya Mara, Erich Kaiser-Titz	Silent	
Mit der Jungfraubahn in die Regionen ewigen Eises	Arnold Fanck		Documentary	
Monte Carlo	Fred Sauer	Frederic Zelnik, Ressel Orla	Silent	
Moritz, der Träumer – Wie sich Moritz die Erschaffung der Welt vorstellt	Leopold Blonder		Animation	
Mosaik	Hans Cürlis		documentary	
Murder Without Cause	E. A. Dupont	Hermann Vallentin, Paul Richter, Hanni Weisse	Crime	
The New Paradise	Willy Zeyn	Esther Carena, Max Adalbert	Silent	
Night of the Burglar	Uwe Jens Krafft	Paul Richter, Aud Egede-Nissen, Rudolf Lettinger	Drama	
The Nights of Cornelis Brouwer	Reinhard Bruck, William Wauer	Albert Bassermann, Colette Corder, Rudolf Klein-Rogge	Thriller	
Nights of Terror	Lupu Pick	Alfred Abel, Arnold Korff	Horror	
The Oath of Peter Hergatz	Alfred Halm	Emil Jannings, Stella Harf, Ernst Stahl-Nachbaur	Drama	
The Oath of Stephan Huller	Reinhard Bruck	Anton Edthofer, Hanni Weisse	Drama	
Off the Rails	William Karfiol	Wilhelm Diegelmann, Ernst Hofmann	Drama	
Opus I	Walter Ruttmann		Animation	
Opus II	Walter Ruttmann		Animation	Film at YouTube (links to video of Opus II through IV with modern soundtrack)
Parisian Women	Léo Lasko	Ressel Orla, Xenia Desni, Ralph Arthur Roberts	Silent	
The Passion of Inge Krafft	Robert Dinesen	Mia May, Albert Steinrück, Conrad Veidt	Drama	
Peter Voss, Thief of Millions	Georg Jacoby	Harry Liedtke, Paul Otto, Mady Christians	Adventure	
Pierrettes Spielzeug	Louis Steel		Animation	
Playing with Fire	Robert Wiene	Diana Karenne, Vasilij Vronski	Comedy frama	
The Poisoned Stream	Urban Gad	Wilhelm Diegelmann, Carl de Vogt	Drama	
The Railway King	Eugen Illés	Fritz Kortner, Hermann Vallentin, Artúr Somlay	Drama	Released in two parts
The Rats	Hanns Kobe	Emil Jannings, Lucie Höflich	Drama	
The Red Peacock	Paul L. Stein	Pola Negri, Victor Varconi	Drama	
Rhythmus 21	Hans Richter		Animation	
The Riddle of the Sphinx	Adolf Gärtner	Ellen Richter, Erich Kaiser-Titz	Adventure	
Roswolsky's Mistress	Felix Basch	Asta Nielsen, Paul Wegener	Drama	
Sappho	Dimitri Buchowetzki	Pola Negri, Alfred Abel, Johannes Riemann	Drama	
Seafaring Is Necessary	Rudolf Biebrach	Hans Marr, Lucie Höflich, Ilka Grüning	Drama	
The Secret of Bombay	Artur Holz	Conrad Veidt, Lil Dagover	Adventure	
The Secret of the Mummy	Victor Janson	Ferdinand von Alten, Aud Egede-Nissen, Magnus Stifter	Crime	
Sehnsucht (Longing)	F. W. Murnau			Presumed lost film IMDb
The Shadow of Gaby Leed	Carl Boese	Tzwetta Tzatschewa, Otto Gebühr	Silent	
Shattered	Lupu Pick	Werner Krauss, Edith Posca	Drama	
The Sins of the Mother	Georg Jacoby	Carl Auen, Käthe Dorsch	Drama	
Sons of the Night	Manfred Noa	Tzwetta Tzatschewa, Hans Albers, Ludwig Rex	Silent	Released in two parts
Der Stern von Bethlehem (The Star of Bethlehem)	Lotte Reiniger		Animation	
The Story of a Maid	Reinhold Schünzel	Liane Haid, Otto Tressler	Drama	
The Story of Christine von Herre	Ludwig Berger	Agnes Straub, Werner Krauss, Paul Hartmann	Drama	
Symphony of Death	Dimitri Buchowetzki	Robert Scholz, Bernhard Goetzke, Hanni Weisse	Silent	
The Terror of the Red Mill	Carl Boese	Aud Egede-Nissen, Otto Gebühr, Alfred Abel	Silent	
Thieves on Strike	Alfred Abel	Alfred Abel, Charlotte Ander, Victor Colani	Silent	
The Thirteen of Steel	Johannes Guter	Carl de Vogt, Georg H. Schnell, Claire Lotto	Crime	
The Three Aunts	Rudolf Biebrach	Lotte Neumann, Olga Limburg, Johannes Riemann	Silent	
Tischlein deck dich, Eselein streck dich, Knüppel aus dem Sack	Wilhelm Prager			
Toteninsel	Carl Froelich	Lil Dagover, Walter Janssen	Horror	
Treasure of the Aztecs	Karl Heiland	Otto Gebühr, Theodor Loos	Adventure	
Trix, the Romance of a Millionairess	Frederic Zelnik	Lya Mara, Ernst Hofmann, Ilka Grüning	Romance	
Der verlorene Schatten (The Lost Shadow)	Rochus Gliese			
Die verschwundene Million (The Million that Disappeared)	Wolfgang Neff	Bela Lugosi		
The Vulture Wally	E. A. Dupont	Albert Steinrück, Henny Porten	Drama	
Wandering Souls	Carl Froelich	Asta Nielsen, Alfred Abel	Drama	
Waves of Life and Love	Lorenz Bätz	Fern Andra, Toni Tetzlaff, Leopold von Ledebur	Romance	
Der Wettlauf zwischen dem Hasen und dem Igel	Harry Jaeger		Animation	
The White Death	Adolf Gärtner	Ellen Richter, Eduard von Winterstein, Hans Adalbert Schlettow	drama	
The Wildcat	Ernst Lubitsch	Pola Negri, Victor Janson	Comedy	
The Woman in the Trunk	Emil Albes	Georg H. Schnell, Margit Barnay, Paul Bildt	Mystery	
A Woman's Revenge	Robert Wiene	Vera Karalli, Franz Egenieff	Drama	
The Women of Gnadenstein	Robert Dinesen, Joe May	Erich Kaiser-Titz, Margarete Schön, Grete Diercks	Drama	
You Are the Life	Franz Eckstein	Erna Morena, Lya De Putti	Silent	
Your Brother's Wife	Franz Eckstein	Olaf Storm, Olga Limburg, Margarete Schlegel	Silent	
