= The Apache Chief =

1920 film

- Directed by: Fred Sauer
- Written by: Fanny Carlsen
- Produced by: Frederic Zelnik
- Starring: Friedrich Zelnik; Wilhelm Diegelmann; Lya Mara
- Production company: Zelnik-Mara-Film
- Release date: 25 November 1920
- Country: Germany
- Languages: Silent; German intertitles

The Apache Chief (German: Der Apachenlord) is a 1920 German silent comedy film directed by Fred Sauer and starring Friedrich Zelnik, Wilhelm Diegelmann and Lya Mara.

== Cast ==
In alphabetical order

- Harry Berber
- Wilhelm Diegelmann
- Lya Mara
- Kurt Mikulski
- Poldi Müller
- Fritz Schulz
- Frederic Zelnik

== Bibliography ==
- Nelmes, Jill; Selbo, Jule, eds. (2015). Women Screenwriters: An International Guide. Basingstoke: Palgrave Macmillan. ISBN 978-1-137-31236-5.
