= The Kreutzer Sonata (1922 film) =

1922 film

- Directed by: Rolf Petersen
- Written by: Fanny Carlsen; Leo Tolstoy (story)
- Starring: Frederic Zelnik; Alfons Fryland; Erich Kaiser-Titz
- Cinematography: Paul Holzki
- Production company: Zelnik-Mara-Film
- Release date: February 1922 (Germany)
- Country: Germany
- Languages: Silent; German intertitles

The Kreutzer Sonata (German: Die Kreutzersonate) is a 1922 German silent film directed by Rolf Petersen and starring Frederic Zelnik, Alfons Fryland, and Erich Kaiser-Titz. It is based on the 1889 novella of the same name by Leo Tolstoy.

== Cast ==
- Frederic Zelnik as Wassja Posdnyschow
- Alfons Fryland as Dimitri Truchatschewski
- Erich Kaiser-Titz as Dr. Truchatschewski
- Stefan Kuzniezoff
- Erika Glässner as Mascha
- Ilka Grüning as Frau Suchoff
- Margarete Schlegel as Nina

== Bibliography ==
- Scheunemann, Dietrich (2006) [2003]. Expressionist Film: New Perspectives. Rochester, NY: Camden House. ISBN 978-1-57113-350-2.
