= Anna Karenina (1920 film) =

1920 film

- Directed by: Frederic Zelnik
- Written by: Fanny Carlsen
- Based on: Anna Karenina; 1878 novel by Leo Tolstoy
- Produced by: Frederic Zelnik
- Starring: Lya Mara; Johannes Riemann; Heinrich Peer
- Cinematography: Willy Goldberger
- Production company: Zelnik-Mara-Film
- Release date: 30 December 1920
- Country: Germany
- Languages: Silent; German intertitles

Anna Karenina is a 1920 German silent historical film, directed by Frederic Zelnik and starring Lya Mara, Johannes Riemann, and Heinrich Peer. It is an adaptation of Leo Tolstoy's 1878 novel Anna Karenina. It premiered at the Marmorhaus in Berlin.

== Cast ==
- Lya Mara as Anna Karenina
- Johannes Riemann as Graf Vronski
- Heinrich Peer as Staatsrat Karenin
- Rudolf Forster as Graf Ljevin
- Olga Engl as Furstin Sherbatzki
- Fritz Achterberg
- Josef Commer
- Melitta Klefer
- Lu L'Arronge
- Dora Schlüter
- Fritz Schulz

== Bibliography ==
- Nelmes, Jill; Selbo, Jule, eds. (2015). Women Screenwriters: An International Guide. Palgrave Macmillan. ISBN 978-1-137-31236-5.
