= The Girl from Piccadilly =

1921 film

- Theatrical film poster
- German: Das Mädel von Picadilly
- Directed by: Frederic Zelnik
- Written by: Fanny Carlsen
- Produced by: Frederic Zelnik
- Starring: Lya Mara; Erich Kaiser-Titz; Fritz Schulz
- Cinematography: Curt Courant; Willy Goldberger
- Production company: Zelnik-Mara-Film
- Distributed by: Deulig-Verleih
- Release date: 9 December 1921
- Country: Germany
- Languages: Silent; German intertitles

The Girl from Piccadilly (German: Das Mädel von Picadilly) is a 1921 German silent film directed by Frederic Zelnik and starring Lya Mara, Erich Kaiser-Titz, and Fritz Schulz. It was released in two separate parts.

== Cast ==
- Lya Mara
- Erich Kaiser-Titz
- Fritz Schulz
- Albert Patry
- Charles Puffy
- Wilhelm Diegelmann
- Paul Passarge
- Ressel Orla
- Gertrud Arnold
- Josef Peterhans
- Josef Commer
- Harry Berber
- Max Ruhbeck
- Ida Perry
- Hermann Picha
