= Monte Carlo (1921 film) =

1921 film

- Theatrical film poster
- Directed by: Fred Sauer
- Written by: Fanny Carlsen
- Produced by: Frederic Zelnik
- Starring: Friedrich Zelnik; Ressel Orla
- Production company: Zelnik-Mara-Film
- Release date: 20 January 1921
- Country: Germany
- Languages: Silent; German intertitles

Monte Carlo is a 1921 German silent film directed by Fred Sauer and starring Friedrich Zelnik and Ressel Orla. It premiered at the Marmorhaus in Berlin.

== Cast ==
In alphabetical order

- Olga Engl
- Richard Georg
- Fred Goebel
- Poldi Müller
- Ressel Orla
- Alfred Schmasow
- Fritz Schulz
- Marie von Buelow
- Frederic Zelnik
