= Napoleon's Daughter =

1922 film

- Theatrical film poster
- German: Die Tochter Napoleons
- Directed by: Frederic Zelnik
- Written by: Fanny Carlsen; Friedrich Werner van Oestéren
- Produced by: Frederic Zelnik
- Starring: Lya Mara; Ludwig Hartau; Ernst Hofmann
- Cinematography: Paul Holzki
- Production company: Zelnik-Mara-Film
- Release date: 2 November 1922
- Country: Germany
- Languages: Silent; German intertitles

Napoleon's Daughter (German: Die Tochter Napoleons) is a 1922 German silent historical film directed by Frederic Zelnik and starring Lya Mara, Ludwig Hartau and Ernst Hofmann. It premiered at the Marmorhaus in Berlin.

The film's sets were designed by the art director Fritz Lederer.

== Cast ==
- Lya Mara as Marion
- Ludwig Hartau as Napoleon
- Ernst Hofmann as Armand
- Charles Willy Kayser as Colonna
- Gertrud de Lalsky as Madame de Marly
- Georg di Georgetti as Granvila
- Albert Patry as Charamont
- Heinrich Peer as Fouché
- Georg H. Schnell as Bertin
- Magnus Stifter as Brissac
- Else Wasa as Desirée
- Kurt Wolowsky as Léon
