= Tania, the Woman in Chains =

1922 film

- German film poster
- German: Tanja, die Frau an der Kette
- Directed by: Frederic Zelnik
- Written by: Elena Nagradskaya (novel); Fanny Carlsen
- Produced by: Frederic Zelnik
- Starring: Lya Mara; Erich Kaiser-Titz; Heinrich Peer
- Cinematography: Willy Goldberger
- Production company: Zelnik-Mara-Film
- Distributed by: Deulig-Verleih
- Release date: 4 January 1922
- Country: Germany
- Languages: Silent; German intertitles

Tania, the Woman in Chains (German: Tanja, die Frau an der Kette) is a 1922 German silent drama film directed by Friedrich Zelnik and starring Lya Mara, Erich Kaiser-Titz, and Heinrich Peer.

The film's sets were designed by the art director Fritz Lederer.

== Cast ==
- Lya Mara as Tanja Fedorovna
- Erich Kaiser-Titz
- Heinrich Peer
- Fritz Schulz
- Maria Forescu
- Erik Wirl
- Harry Berber
- Sophie Pagay
- Paul Hansen
