= Memoirs of a Film Actress =

1921 film

- German film poster
- German: Aus den Memoiren einer Filmschauspielerin
- Directed by: Frederic Zelnik
- Written by: Fanny Carlsen
- Produced by: Frederic Zelnik
- Starring: Lya Mara; Ernst Hofmann; Wilhelm Diegelmann
- Cinematography: Willy Goldberger
- Production company: Zelnik-Mara-Film
- Distributed by: Deulig-Verleih
- Release date: 22 September 1921
- Country: Germany
- Languages: Silent; German intertitles

Memoirs of a Film Actress (German: Aus den Memoiren einer Filmschauspielerin) is a 1921 German silent film directed by Frederic Zelnik and starring Lya Mara, Ernst Hofmann and Wilhelm Diegelmann. It premiered at the Marmorhaus in Berlin.

The film's sets were designed by the art director Fritz Lederer.

== Cast ==
- Lya Mara
- Ernst Hofmann
- Wilhelm Diegelmann
- Ilka Grüning
- Richard Georg
- Charles Puffy
- Hermann Picha
- Fritz Schulz
- Paul Westermeier
