= Yoshiwara (disambiguation) =

Yoshiwara is a famous yūkaku (red-light district) in Tokyo.

Yoshiwara may also refer to:

- Yoshiwara, Shizuoka, a city in eastern Shizuoka Prefecture
- Yoshiwara Station, Fuji, Shizuoka Prefecture, Japan
- Yoshiwara (1920 film), a German silent film
- Yoshiwara (1937 film), a French drama film
- Yoshiwara is the name of a Burlesque club, referred to as a "House of Sin", in Fritz Lang's 1927 sci-fi Silent film Metropolis.
