= The Nun and the Harlequin =

- Directed by: Alfred Halm
- Written by: Franz W. Koebner
- Produced by: Frederic Zelnik
- Starring: Frederic Zelnik; Lya Mara; Paul Bildt
- Production company: Berliner Film-Manufaktur
- Release date: June 1918
- Country: Germany
- Languages: Silent; German intertitles

The Nun and the Harlequin (German: Die Nonne und der Harlekin) is a 1918 German silent drama film. It is directed by Alfred Halm and stars Frederic Zelnik, Lya Mara, and Paul Bildt.

== Cast ==
- Frederic Zelnik
- Lya Mara
- Paul Bildt
- Heinrich Schroth
- Hermann Vallentin

== Bibliography ==
- Bock, Hans-Michael & Bergfelder, Tim. The Concise CineGraph. Encyclopedia of German Cinema. Berghahn Books, 2009.
