= Insulted and Humiliated =

1922 film

- German film poster
- German: Erniedrigte und Beleidigte
- Directed by: Frederic Zelnik
- Written by: Fanny Carlsen
- Starring: Lya Mara; Erich Kaiser-Titz; Ralph Arthur Roberts
- Cinematography: Paul Holzki
- Production company: Zelnik-Mara-Film
- Release date: 1 September 1922
- Country: Germany
- Languages: Silent; German intertitles

Insulted and Humiliated (German: Erniedrigte und Beleidigte) is a 1922 German silent drama film directed by Frederic Zelnik and starring Lya Mara, Erich Kaiser-Titz and Ralph Arthur Roberts. It is an adaptation of the 1861 novel Humiliated and Insulted by Fyodor Dostoevsky. It premiered at the Marmorhaus in Berlin.

The film's sets were designed by the art director Fritz Lederer.

== Cast ==
- Lya Mara
- Erich Kaiser-Titz
- Ralph Arthur Roberts
- Lydia Potechina
- Margarete Schön
- Anton Edthofer
- Fred Goebel
- Nikolai Malikoff
- Albert Patry
- Tatjana Tarydina
