= The Marriage of Princess Demidoff =

1922 film

- Directed by: Frederic Zelnik
- Written by: Fanny Carlsen
- Produced by: Frederic Zelnik
- Starring: Lya Mara; Charles Willy Kayser; Olga Limburg
- Cinematography: Paul Holzki
- Production company: Zelnik-Mara-Film
- Release date: 1 April 1922
- Country: Germany
- Languages: Silent; German intertitles

The Marriage of Princess Demidoff (German: Die Ehe der Fürstin Demidoff) is a 1922 German silent drama film directed by Frederic Zelnik and starring Lya Mara, Charles Willy Kayser, and Olga Limburg. It premiered at the Marmorhaus cinema in Berlin.

The film's sets were designed by the art director Fritz Lederer.

== Cast ==
In alphabetical order

- Colette Corder as Celeste
- Olga Engl as Lady Belrose
- Alfons Fryland as Claude Belrose
- Bernhard Goetzke as Rodja
- Charles Willy Kayser as Romilty, actor
- Olga Limburg as Countess Dolly
- Lya Mara as Princess Demidoff
- Jenny Marba as Kate Dusbar
- Fritz Schulz as Tobby
- Hermann Vallentin as Prince Demidoff

== Bibliography ==
- Grange, William (2008). Cultural Chronicle of the Weimar Republic. Lanham, MD: Scarecrow Press. ISBN 978-0-8108-5967-8.
