= Count Varenne's Lover =

1921 film

- Directed by: Frederic Zelnik
- Written by: Fanny Carlsen
- Produced by: Frederic Zelnik
- Starring: Lya Mara; Josef Commer; Johannes Riemann; Robert Scholz
- Production company: Zelnik-Mara-Film
- Distributed by: Deulig-Verleih
- Release date: 3 March 1921
- Country: Germany
- Languages: Silent; German intertitles

Count Varenne's Lover (German: Die Geliebte des Grafen Varenne) is a 1921 German silent comedy film directed by Frederic Zelnik and starring Lya Mara, Josef Commer, and Johannes Riemann. It premiered at the Marmorhaus in Berlin on 3 March 1921.

== Cast ==
- Lya Mara as Die Geliebte
- Josef Commer as Maitre Filou
- Johannes Riemann
- Robert Scholz
- Colette Corder
- Olga Engl
- Heinrich Peer
- Karl Platen
- Leopold von Ledebur

== Bibliography ==
- Grange, William (2008). Cultural Chronicle of the Weimar Republic. Lanham, MD: Scarecrow Press. ISBN 978-0-8108-5967-8.
