= The Girl from Hell =

1923 film

- Directed by: Frederic Zelnik
- Written by: Fanny Carlsen
- Produced by: Frederic Zelnik
- Starring: Lya Mara; Carl Auen; Harald Paulsen
- Cinematography: Paul Holzki
- Production company: Zelnik-Mara-Film
- Release date: 1 February 1923
- Country: Germany
- Languages: Silent; German intertitles

The Girl from Hell (German: Das Mädel aus der Hölle) is a 1923 German silent drama film directed by Frederic Zelnik and starring Lya Mara, Carl Auen and Harald Paulsen. It premiered at the Marmorhaus in Berlin.

The film's sets were designed by the art director Fritz Lederer.

== Cast ==
- Lya Mara
- Carl Auen
- Harald Paulsen
- Emmy Wyda
- Kurt Goetze
- Harry Gondi
- Knud Horvard
- Gustav May
- Albert Patry
- Emil Stammer

== Bibliography ==
- Bock, Hans-Michael & Bergfelder, Tim. The Concise CineGraph. Encyclopedia of German Cinema. Berghahn Books, 2009.
