= Resurrection (1923 film) =

1923 film

- Directed by: Frederic Zelnik
- Written by: Fanny Carlsen
- Produced by: Frederic Zelnik
- Starring: Lya Mara; Rudolf Forster; Lydia Potechina
- Cinematography: Otto Tober
- Production company: Zelnik-Mara-Film
- Release date: August 1923
- Country: Germany
- Languages: Silent; German intertitles

Resurrection (German: Auferstehung or Katjuscha Maslowa) is a 1923 German silent drama film directed by Frederic Zelnik and starring Lya Mara, Rudolf Forster and Lydia Potechina. based upon Resurrection (Tolstoy novel). It premiered at the Marmorhaus in Berlin.

== Cast ==
- Lya Mara
- Rudolf Forster
- Lydia Potechina
- Paul Graetz
- Olga Engl
- Leonhard Haskel
- Ilka Grüning
- Karl Falkenberg
- Maria Forescu
- Lili Alexandra
- Josef Commer
- Rudolf Klein-Rhoden
- Albert Patry
- Maria Peterson
- Lydia Tridenskaja

== Bibliography ==
- Bock, Hans-Michael & Bergfelder, Tim. The Concise CineGraph. Encyclopedia of German Cinema. Berghahn Books, 2009.
