= Daisy (1923 film) =

1923 film

- German film poster
- Directed by: Frederic Zelnik
- Written by: Fanny Carlsen; Harry Etting
- Produced by: Frederic Zelnik
- Starring: Lya Mara; Alfons Fryland; Hans Schüren
- Cinematography: Otto Tober
- Production company: Zelnik-Mara-Film
- Release date: 21 November 1923
- Country: Germany
- Languages: Silent; German intertitles

Daisy: The Adventures of a Lady (German: Daisy. Das Abenteuer einer Lady) is a 1923 German silent romantic drama film directed by Frederic Zelnik and starring Lya Mara, Alfons Fryland, and Hans Schüren. It premiered at the Marmorhaus in Berlin.

The film's sets were designed by the art director Georg Meyer.

== Cast ==
- Lya Mara
- Alfons Fryland
- Hans Schüren
- Adolphe Engers
- Lili Alexandra
- Olga Engl
- Frida Richard
- Ilka Grüning
- Albert Patry
- Frederic Zelnik
