= The Mistress of the King =

1922 film

- Theatrical film poster
- German: Die Geliebte des Königs
- Directed by: Frederic Zelnik
- Written by: Fanny Carlsen
- Produced by: Frederic Zelnik
- Starring: Lya Mara; Hans Albers
- Cinematography: Paul Holzki
- Production company: Zelnik-Mara-Film
- Release date: 10 May 1922
- Country: Germany
- Languages: Silent; German intertitles

The Mistress of the King (German: Die Geliebte des Königs) is a 1922 German silent film directed by Frederic Zelnik and starring Lya Mara and Hans Albers. It premiered at the Marmorhaus in Berlin.

The film's sets were designed by the art director Fritz Lederer.

== Cast ==
- Hans Albers
- Erich Kaiser-Titz
- Lya Mara
- Julia Serda
