= Count Festenberg =

1922 German film

- Theatrical film poster
- German: Graf Festenberg
- Directed by: Urban Gad; Frederic Zelnik
- Written by: Fanny Carlsen
- Produced by: Frederic Zelnik
- Starring: Charles Willy Kayser; Harald Paulsen; Heinrich Peer
- Production company: Zelnik-Mara-Film
- Release date: 7 December 1922
- Country: Germany
- Languages: Silent; German intertitles

Count Festenberg (German: Graf Festenberg) is a 1922 German silent film directed by Urban Gad and Frederic Zelnik and starring Charles Willy Kayser, Harald Paulsen, Heinrich Peer and Paul Rehkopf.

== Cast ==
In alphabetical order

- Charles Willy Kayser
- Harald Paulsen
- Heinrich Peer
- Paul Rehkopf
- Maria Widal
- Frederic Zelnik
