= The Men of Sybill =

1923 film

- German film poster
- German: Die Männer der Sybill
- Directed by: Frederic Zelnik
- Written by: Fanny Carlsen
- Produced by: Frederic Zelnik
- Starring: Lya Mara; Carl Auen; Rudolf Forster
- Cinematography: Axel Graatkjær
- Production company: Zelnik-Mara-Film
- Release date: 28 February 1923
- Country: Germany
- Languages: Silent; German intertitles

The Men of Sybill (German: Die Männer der Sybill) is a 1923 German silent drama film directed by Frederic Zelnik and starring Lya Mara, Carl Auen and Rudolf Forster. It was screened at the Marmorhaus in Berlin.

The film's sets were designed by the art director Fritz Lederer.

== Cast ==
In alphabetical order

- Carl Auen
- Rudolf Forster
- Fritz Lederer
- Lya Mara
- Albert Patry
- Harald Paulsen
- Frida Richard
- Johannes Riemann
- Käte Tann
