= Kri-Kri, the Duchess of Tarabac =

1920 film

- Theatrical film poster
- German: Kri-Kri, die Herzogin von Tarabac
- Directed by: Frederic Zelnik
- Written by: Fanny Carlsen
- Produced by: Frederic Zelnik
- Starring: Lya Mara; Johannes Riemann; Gisela Werbisek
- Production company: Zelnik-Mara-Film
- Release date: 23 June 1920
- Country: Germany
- Languages: Silent; German intertitles

Kri-Kri, the Duchess of Tarabac (German: Kri-Kri, die Herzogin von Tarabac) is a 1920 German silent comedy film directed by Frederic Zelnik and starring Lya Mara, Johannes Riemann, and Gisela Werbisek. It premiered at the Marmorhaus in Berlin.

== Cast ==
- Lya Mara as Kri-Kri
- Johannes Riemann
- Gisela Werbisek
- Wilhelm Diegelmann
- Hans Junkermann
- Hermann Picha
- Helene Voß
- Karl Platen
- Fritz Schulz
- Ernst Behmer
