= Hell of Love =

1926 film

- Directed by: Bruno Rahn
- Written by: Erich Herzog
- Produced by: Bruno Rahn
- Starring: Vivian Gibson; Erich Kaiser-Titz; William Dieterle
- Cinematography: Ernst Krohn
- Production company: Pantomim-Film
- Distributed by: Pantomim-Film
- Release date: October 1926 (Berlin)
- Country: Germany
- Languages: Silent; German intertitles

Hell of Love (German: Hölle der Liebe – Erlebnisse aus einem Tanzpalast) is a 1926 German silent drama film directed by Bruno Rahn and starring Vivian Gibson, Erich Kaiser-Titz, and William Dieterle.

The film's sets were designed by the art director Otto Guelstorff.

== Cast ==
- Vivian Gibson as Gisela Longartt
- Erich Kaiser-Titz as Baron Brook
- William Dieterle as Werner Ehlermann
- Didier Aslan as Fritz, sein Bruder
- Olga Engl as Die Mutter
- Georg John as Heinicke, Prokurist
- Cläre Lotto as Erika, seine Tochter
- Emmy Wyda as Adele, die Tante
- Siegfried Berisch as Pötsch
- Lili Schoenborn-Anspach as Hanna
- Eva Speyer as Eine Spielerin

== Bibliography ==
- Mierendorff, Marta; O'Dell, Jackie (1993). William Dieterle: der Plutarch von Hollywood (in German). Berlin: Henschel. ISBN 978-3-89487-177-2.
