= Yvette, the Fashion Princess =

1922 film

- Theatrical film poster
- German: Yvette, die Modeprinzessin
- Directed by: Frederic Zelnik
- Produced by: Frederic Zelnik
- Starring: Lya Mara; Erich Kaiser-Titz; Robert Scholz
- Cinematography: Paul Holzki
- Production company: Zelnik-Mara-Film
- Release date: 10 August 1922
- Country: Germany
- Languages: Silent; German intertitles

Yvette, the Fashion Princess (German: Yvette, die Modeprinzessin) is a 1922 German silent comedy film directed by Frederic Zelnik and starring Lya Mara, Erich Kaiser-Titz, and Robert Scholz.

The film's sets were designed by the art director Fritz Lederer.

== Cast ==
In alphabetical order

- Else Berna
- Karl Harbacher
- Erich Kaiser-Titz
- Lya Mara
- Arnold Rieck
- Robert Scholz
- Fritz Schulz
- Magnus Stifter
