= Leap into Bliss =

1934 film

Leap into Bliss (German: Salto in die Seligkeit) is a 1934 Austrian comedy film directed by Fritz Schulz and starring Schulz, Olly Gebauer and Rosy Barsony. It was one of a number of Austrian films made by newly founded independent film companies by German filmmakers who were forced to leave Nazi Germany after 1933 - a cycle which ended with the Anchluss of 1938.

== Cast ==
- Fritz Schulz - Fritz Wiesinger
- Olly Gebauer - Anny
- Rosy Barsony - Ilona, ein Revuestar
- Felix Bressart - Kriegel, Geheimdetektiv
- Josef Rehberger - Rudi May, Inhaber Warenhaus May
- Tibor Halmay - Karl, ein ehemaliger Artist
- Fritz Imhoff - Ein Herr aus Linz
- Hans Homma - Braun - Geschäftsführer
- Iris Arlan - Mrs. Huber
- Hans Unterkircher - Baron Rivoli
- Illa Raudnitz - Verkäuferin im Warenhaus

== Bibliography ==
- Kohl, Katrin & Robertson, Ritchie. A History of Austrian Literature 1918-2000. Camden House, 2006.
