= Big City Children =

1929 film

- Directed by: Arthur Haase
- Written by: Arthur Haase
- Produced by: Arthur Haase
- Starring: Grete Reinwald; Gustl Gstettenbaur; Carl Auen
- Cinematography: Josef Dietze; Paul Holzki
- Production company: Haase-Filmproduktion
- Release date: 6 December 1929
- Country: Germany
- Languages: Silent; German intertitles

Big City Children (German: Großstadtkinder - Zwischen Spree und Panke) is a 1929 German silent film directed by Arthur Haase and starring Grete Reinwald, Gustl Gstettenbaur and Carl Auen.

The film's sets were designed by Robert A. Dietrich.

== Cast ==
- Grete Reinwald
- Carl Töpfer
- Carl Auen
- Karl Harbacher
- Henk Kleinmann
- Li Hayda
- Heinz Könecke
- Gustl Gstettenbaur
- Karl Falkenberg

== Bibliography ==
- Gerhard Lamprecht. Deutsche Stummfilme: 1927–1931.
