= The Venus of Montmartre =

1925 film

- Directed by: Frederic Zelnik
- Starring: Lya Mara; Hans Albers; Jack Trevor; Olga Chekhova
- Production company: Zelnik-Mara-Film
- Release date: 1925
- Running time: 97 minutes
- Country: Germany
- Languages: Silent; German intertitles

The Venus of Montmartre (German: Die Venus vom Montmartre or Die Venus von Montmartre) is a 1925 German silent drama film directed by Frederic Zelnik and starring Lya Mara, Hans Albers, Jack Trevor, and Olga Chekhova.

== Cast ==
In alphabetical order

- Hans Albers as Tricotin
- Olga Chekhova as Countess Sullivan
- Hugo Döblin as Mouchu
- Karl Harbacher as The Musician
- Lya Mara as Joujou
- Heinrich Peer as Count Sullivan
- Hermann Picha as The Painter
- Karl Platen as Mon. Frossart
- Hans Hermann Schaufuß as The Writer
- Jack Trevor as Prince of Chéran

== Bibliography ==
- Grange, William. Cultural Chronicle of the Weimar Republic. Scarecrow Press, 2008.
