= On the Banks of the River Weser =

1927 film

- Directed by: Siegfried Philippi
- Written by: Siegfried Philippi
- Starring: Carl Auen; Olga Engl; Camilla Spira
- Cinematography: Max Grix
- Music by: Felix Bartsch
- Production company: Albö-Film
- Distributed by: Albö-Film
- Release date: 19 May 1927
- Country: Germany
- Languages: Silent; German intertitles

On the Banks of the River Weser (German: An der Weser) is a 1927 German silent drama film directed by Siegfried Philippi and starring Carl Auen, Olga Engl, and Camilla Spira.

The film's sets were designed by Willi Herrmann.

== Cast ==
In alphabetical order

- Carl Auen
- Fritz Beckmann
- Olga Engl
- Charles Willy Kayser
- Otto Kronburger
- Sophie Pagay
- Hermann Picha
- Karl Platen
- Grete Reinwald
- Frida Richard
- Ernst Rückert
- Camilla Spira
- Fritz Spira
- Eduard von Winterstein
- Ernst Winar

== Bibliography ==
- Grange, William (2008). Cultural Chronicle of the Weimar Republic. Lanham, MD: Scarecrow Press. ISBN 978-0-8108-5967-8.
