= The Law of the Desert =

1920 film

- German: Das Gesetz der Wüste
- Directed by: Fred Sauer
- Written by: Fanny Carlsen
- Produced by: Frederic Zelnik
- Starring: Bernhard Goetzke; Heinrich Peer
- Cinematography: Willy Goldberger
- Production company: Zelnik-Mara-Film
- Release date: 23 September 1920
- Country: Germany
- Languages: Silent; German intertitles

The Law of the Desert (German: Das Gesetz der Wüste) is a 1920 German silent adventure film directed by Fred Sauer and starring Bernhard Goetzke and Heinrich Peer.

The film's sets were designed by the art director Fritz Lederer.

== Cast ==
- Josef Commer
- Bernhard Goetzke
- Emil Mamelok
- Heinrich Peer
- Henri Peters-Arnolds
- Josefine Dora
- Editha Seidel
