= The Serenyi =

1918 film

- Directed by: Alfred Halm
- Written by: Otto Erich Hartleben (novella)
- Produced by: Frederic Zelnik
- Starring: Lya Mara; Erich Kaiser-Titz; Conrad Veidt
- Production company: Berliner Film-Manufaktur
- Release date: April 1918
- Country: Germany
- Languages: Silent; German intertitles

The Serenyi (German: Die Serenyi) is a 1918 German silent film directed by Alfred Halm and starring Lya Mara, Erich Kaiser-Titz, and Conrad Veidt. It is a lost film.

== Cast ==
- Lya Mara
- Erich Kaiser-Titz
- Conrad Veidt
- Lupu Pick
- Leopold von Ledebur

== Bibliography ==
- John T. Soister. Conrad Veidt on Screen: A Comprehensive Illustrated Filmography. McFarland, 2002.
