= Winter Storms =

1924 film

- Directed by: Otto Rippert
- Written by: Roberto Jentschura
- Cinematography: Otto Kanturek
- Production company: Europäische Lichtbild
- Release date: 1924
- Country: Germany
- Languages: Silent; German intertitles

Winter Storms (German:Winterstürme) is a 1924 German silent film directed by Otto Rippert.

== Cast ==
- Carl Auen
- Jean Blatzheim
- Carla Collin
- Lilian Robs
- Hans Adalbert Schlettow
