= The Sensational Trial =

1923 film

- Directed by: Karl Freund
- Written by: Paul Rosenhayn
- Starring: Erich Kaiser-Titz; Käthe Haack; Heinrich Schroth
- Cinematography: Karl Freund
- Production company: Eisi-Film
- Distributed by: Eisi-Film
- Release date: 17 May 1923
- Country: Germany
- Languages: Silent; German intertitles

The Sensational Trial (German: Der große Sensationsprozeß) is a 1923 German silent film directed by Karl Freund and starring Erich Kaiser-Titz, Käthe Haack and Heinrich Schroth.

The film's sets were designed by the art director Heinrich Richter.

== Cast ==
- Erich Kaiser-Titz as Defense lawyer
- Käthe Haack as Defense lawyer's wife
- Heinrich Schroth as Fragwürdige Existenz
- Hugo Flink as Angeklagter
- Willy Kaiser-Heyl as Judge
- Arnold Czempin as Fremder Gast
- Emil Rameau as Untersuchungsrichter
- Preben J. Rist as Redakteur
- Anna von Palen as Mutter

== Bibliography ==
- Bock, Hans-Michael & Bergfelder, Tim. The Concise CineGraph. Encyclopedia of German Cinema. Berghahn Books, 2009.
