= The Yellow Diplomat =

1920 film

- Directed by: Fred Sauer
- Written by: Fanny Carlsen
- Produced by: Frederic Zelnik
- Starring: Käthe Haack; Nien Soen Ling; Nien Tso Ling
- Cinematography: Willy Goldberger
- Production company: Zelnik-Mara-Film
- Release date: 14 November 1920
- Country: Germany
- Languages: Silent; German intertitles

The Yellow Diplomat (German: Der gelbe Diplomat) is a 1920 German silent film directed by Fred Sauer and starring Käthe Haack, Nien Soen Ling and Nien Tso Ling.

== Cast ==
- Käthe Haack
- Nien Soen Ling
- Nien Tso Ling
- Grete Lundt
- Fritz Schult
- Hermann Vallentin as Gesandter
- Frederic Zelnik as Chinese Diplomat

== Bibliography ==
- Bock, Hans-Michael & Bergfelder, Tim. The Concise CineGraph. Encyclopedia of German Cinema. Berghahn Books, 2009.
