= The Fire Dancer =

1925 film directed by Robert Dinesen

- Scene from a film
- German: Die Feuertänzerin
- Directed by: Robert Dinesen
- Written by: Ernst Klein (novel); Robert Dinesen; Walter Jonas
- Starring: Alfred Abel; Ruth Weyher; Carl Auen
- Cinematography: Julius Balting
- Production company: Phoebus Film
- Distributed by: Phoebus Film
- Release date: July 1925
- Country: Germany
- Languages: Silent; German intertitles

The Fire Dancer (German: Die Feuertänzerin) is a 1925 German silent film directed by Robert Dinesen and starring Alfred Abel, Ruth Weyher and Carl Auen.

The film's sets were designed by the art director Willi Herrmann.

== Cast ==
- Alfred Abel as General director Godenberg
- Ruth Weyher as Malanie, his wife
- Carl Auen as Holland, engineer
- Hans Heinrich von Twardowski as Bartos, his friend
- Erich Kaiser-Titz as coroner
- Rosa Valetti as Portier's wife
- Trude Berliner
- Harry Halm
- Jenny Jugo
- Mary Nolan
