= The Owl (1927 film) =

1927 film

- Directed by: Eddie Polo
- Written by: Margarethe Schmahl
- Starring: Eddie Polo; Erich Kaiser-Titz; Hans Adalbert Schlettow
- Cinematography: Max Grix
- Production company: Maria Zach Film
- Release date: 1927
- Country: Germany
- Languages: Silent; German intertitles

The Owl (German: Die Eule) is a 1927 German thriller film directed by and starring Eddie Polo. It was released in two parts.

The film's sets were designed by Fritz Willi Krohn.

== Cast ==
- Eddie Polo as Jack Clifford
- Erich Kaiser-Titz as O'Brian
- Hans Adalbert Schlettow
- Fritz Schnell as Henry Hogan
- Dorothy Douglas as Alice Hogan

== Bibliography ==
- Alfred Krautz. International directory of cinematographers, set- and costume designers in film, Volume 4. Saur, 1984.
