= Nelly, the Bride Without a Husband =

1924 film

- German: Nelly, die Braut ohne Mann
- Directed by: Frederic Zelnik
- Written by: Fanny Carlsen
- Produced by: Frederic Zelnik
- Starring: Lya Mara; Erich Kaiser-Titz; Else Berna
- Cinematography: Otto Tober
- Production company: Zelnik-Mara-Film
- Distributed by: Deulig-Verleih
- Release date: 14 March 1924
- Country: Germany
- Languages: Silent; German intertitles

Nelly, the Bride Without a Husband (German: Nelly, die Braut ohne Mann) is a 1924 German silent comedy film directed by Frederic Zelnik and starring Lya Mara, Erich Kaiser-Titz and Else Berna.

The film's sets were designed by the art director Georg Meyer.

== Cast ==
- Lya Mara
- Erich Kaiser-Titz
- Else Berna
- Olga Engl
- Magnus Stifter
- Anton Pointner
