= The Lost Paradise (1917 film) =

1917 film

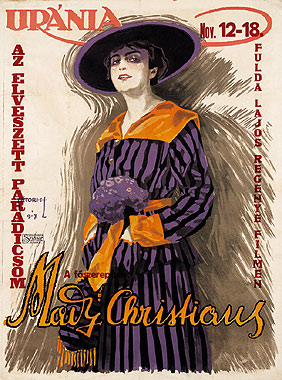
- Hungarian poster for the film
- Directed by: Alfred Halm
- Screenplay by: Richard Wilde
- Based on: Das verlorene Paradies (play) by Ludwig Fulda
- Produced by: Frederic Zelnik
- Starring: Mady Christians; Erich Kaiser-Titz; Bruno Kastner
- Production company: Berliner Film-Manufaktur
- Release date: December 1917
- Country: Germany
- Languages: Silent; German intertitles

The Lost Paradise (German: Das verlorene Paradies) is a 1917 German silent drama film directed by Alfred Halm and starring Mady Christians, Erich Kaiser-Titz and Bruno Kastner.

== Plot ==
At the centre of the plot is the factory owner's daughter Edith Bernardi, who is raised by her parents with idolatrous love to keep her away from all evil. For Edith, life is like paradise. This paradise comes to an abrupt end when she meets the young engineer Hans Arndt, Prof Ottendorf's assistant, who confronts her with the rough side of life for the first time. These experiences bring about decisive changes in her.

She begins to take an interest in the needs of her fellow human beings and sheds all her selfishness. The spoilt princess becomes a compassionate young woman who campaigns for the fulfilment of the workers' justified demands for higher wages in her father's company. After Ottendorf's death, Edith persuades her father, the industrial magnate Julius Bernardi, to hire Hans as director of his company. Edith begins to separate from her fiancé Richard Ottendorf, the son of the deceased professor, when she recognises his selfishness and heartlessness. Instead, she and Hans get together.

== Cast ==
- Mady Christians as Edith Bernardi
- Erich Kaiser-Titz
- Bruno Kastner as Hans Arndt
- Bruno Eichgrün
- Ernst Stahl-Nachbaur
- Ernst Sachs
- Olga Wojan

== Production ==
Paradise Lost premiered in November or December 1917 at the Kammerlichtspiele at Potsdamer Platz. The film, which was banned for young people ("Jugendverbot"), consisted of four acts and was approximately 1,500 meters long in Austria-Hungary, where it premiered on December 28, 1917.

== Reception ==
"Ludwig Fulda was reluctant to give his consent to the filming of his novel, which is now being performed simultaneously at the Burgtheater and in the cinema, because he was not a fan of the cinema, but when he saw Mady Christians in the role of Edith Bernardi, the main character of this play, all his reservations disappeared at a stroke... (...) Bruno Kastner, Ernst Stahl-Nachbaur and the other actors all gave their best. The direction and photography are also completely flawless, so that the film should enjoy great success with the audience."

Paimann's film lists summarised: ‘Material, photos and scenery very good, acting excellent.’

== Bibliography ==
- Parish, James Robert. Film Actors Guide. Scarecrow Press, 1977.
