= Irene of Gold =

1923 film

- German: Irene d'Or
- Directed by: Karl Sander; Frederic Zelnik
- Written by: Fanny Carlsen
- Produced by: Frederic Zelnik
- Starring: Margarete Schlegel; Yelena Polevitskaya; Hans Albers
- Production company: Zelnik-Mara-Film
- Release date: 15 February 1923
- Country: Germany
- Languages: Silent; German intertitles

Irene of Gold (German: Irene d'Or) is a 1923 German silent film directed by Karl Sander and Frederic Zelnik and starring Margarete Schlegel, Yelena Polevitskaya and Hans Albers.

== Cast ==
- Margarete Schlegel
- Yelena Polevitskaya
- Hans Albers
- Rita Clermont
- Olga Engl
- Albert Patry
- Frida Richard
- Magnus Stifter
- Leopold von Ledebur
- Frederic Zelnik
