= Miss Beryll =

1921 film

- Directed by: Frederic Zelnik
- Written by: Fanny Carlsen
- Produced by: Frederic Zelnik
- Starring: Lya Mara; Erich Kaiser-Titz; Fritz Schulz
- Cinematography: Willy Goldberger
- Production company: Zelnik-Mara-Film
- Release date: 16 April 1921
- Country: Germany
- Languages: Silent; German intertitles

Miss Beryll (German: Miss Beryll ... die Laune eines Millionärs) is a 1921 German silent film directed by Frederic Zelnik and starring Lya Mara, Erich Kaiser-Titz, and Fritz Schulz. The film's sets were designed by the art director Fritz Lederer. It premiered at the Marmorhaus in Berlin.

== Cast ==
- Lya Mara as Miss Beryll
- Erich Kaiser-Titz as Millionär
- Fritz Schulz as Sekretär
- Olga Engl
- Loo Hardy
- Ernst Hofmann
- Charles Puffy
- Willy Kaiser-Titz
- Charles Willy Kayser

== Bibliography ==
- Bock, Hans-Michael; Bergfelder, Tim, eds. (2009). The Concise Cinegraph: Encyclopaedia of German Cinema. New York: Berghahn Books. ISBN 978-1-57181-655-9.
