= Athletes (film) =

1925 film

- Directed by: Frederic Zelnik
- Written by: Hans Behrendt; Fanny Carlsen; Olga Wohlbrück (novel)
- Starring: Asta Nielsen; Gregori Chmara; Arnold Korff
- Cinematography: Alfred Hansen
- Music by: Eduard Riemann
- Production company: Phoebus Film
- Distributed by: Phoebus Film
- Release date: 18 March 1925
- Country: Germany
- Languages: Silent; German intertitles

Athletes (German: Athleten) is a 1925 German silent film directed by Frederic Zelnik and starring Asta Nielsen, Gregori Chmara and Arnold Korff.

The film's sets were designed by the art director Alfred Junge. The film was released on 18 March 1925.

== Cast ==
- Asta Nielsen as Prinzessin Wanda Hoheneck
- Gregori Chmara as Lawyer Dr. Kürer
- Arnold Korff as Fürst Erasmus von Hoheneck
- Hans Sternberg as Jasomirgott Stumper
- Theodor Becker as Meisterboxer Tom King
- Emmy Sturm as Kari Tass
- Lydia Potechina as Natalie Stumper
- Kurt Vespermann as Fridolin Stumper
- Hans Albers as Graf Sternfeld
- Walter Brande as Manager Steffens
- Evi Eva as Gräfin Sternfeld

== Bibliography ==
- Gramann, Karola; Schlüpmann, Heide, eds. (2009). Nachtfalter: Asta Nielsen, ihr Filme. Vol. 2. Vienna: Filmarchiv Austria. ISBN 978-3-902531-76-6.
