= Golden Boy (1925 film) =

1925 film

- Directed by: H. Klynmann
- Written by: Armin Petersen
- Starring: Grete Reinwald; Carl Auen
- Cinematography: Paul Holzki
- Production company: Mundator-Film
- Release date: 1925
- Country: Germany
- Languages: Silent; German intertitles

Golden Boy (German: Goldjunge) is a 1925 German silent film directed by H. Klynmann and starring Grete Reinwald and Carl Auen.

The film's sets were designed by the art director Robert A. Dietrich.

== Cast ==
- Henkie Klein as Bolleken
- Grete Reinwald as Fräulein von Rohden
- Carl Auen as Arzt
- Karl Harbacher as Droschkenkutscher
- Johanna Ewald as Drehorgeljule
- Josef Commer as Leierkastenmann
- Maria Grünke as Vorsteherin im Fürsorgeamt
- Marga Marfels as Gesellschafterin
- Gret Alexander as Zofe
- Michael Scharf as Förster

== Bibliography ==
- Bock, Hans-Michael & Bergfelder, Tim. The Concise CineGraph. Encyclopedia of German Cinema. Berghahn Books, 2009.
