= Everyone Asks for Erika =

1931 film

- German film poster
- German: Jeder fragt nach Erika
- Directed by: Frederic Zelnik
- Written by: Fritz Grünbaum
- Produced by: Frederic Zelnik
- Starring: Lya Mara; Alexander Murski; Walter Janssen
- Cinematography: Friedl Behn-Grund
- Music by: Mihály Eisemann; Willy Schmidt-Gentner
- Production company: Friedrich Zelnick-Film
- Distributed by: Deutsche Lichtspiel-Syndikat
- Release date: 1 October 1931
- Running time: 96 minutes
- Country: Germany
- Language: German

Everyone Asks for Erika (German: Jeder fragt nach Erika) is a 1931 German musical comedy film directed by Frederic Zelnik and starring Lya Mara, Alexander Murski and Walter Janssen. The film's sets were designed by the art director Robert Neppach.

== Cast ==
- Lya Mara as Erika Poliakoff
- Alexander Murski as Poliakoff - her Dad
- Walter Janssen as Kurt von Zeillern
- Ernö Verebes as Otto Rebes - Redakteur
- Ralph Arthur Roberts
- Berthe Ostyn
- Fritz Ley
- Max Gülstorff
- Paul Westermeier
- Adele Sandrock
- Charles Willy Kayser
- Gretl Theimer
- Viktor Franz
- Karl Harbacher
