= Lyda Ssanin =

1923 film

- Directed by: Frederic Zelnik
- Written by: Mikhail Artsybashev (novel Sanin); Fanny Carlsen
- Produced by: Frederic Zelnik
- Starring: Lya Mara; Hans Albers; Rudolf Forster
- Cinematography: Otto Tober
- Production company: Zelnik-Mara-Film
- Release date: 10 May 1923
- Country: Germany
- Languages: Silent; German intertitles

Lyda Ssanin is a 1923 German silent film directed by Frederic Zelnik and starring Lya Mara, Hans Albers and Rudolf Forster.

The film's sets were designed by the art director Fritz Lederer.

The plot is based on the novel Sanin by Mikhail Petrovich Artzybashev, which despite the title, largely follows the life of protagonist's sister, Lida Sanina (rendered in German film as Lyda Ssanin).

== Cast ==
In alphabetical order

- Hans Albers
- Carl Auen
- Rudolf Forster
- Ernst Hofmann
- Stefan Kuzniezoff as Piotr Ilitsch
- Lya Mara
- Josef Niedt as Kutscher
- Frida Richard
- Jacob Schigorin as Jegor

== See also ==
- Ssanin (1924)

== Bibliography ==
- Bock, Hans-Michael & Bergfelder, Tim. The Concise CineGraph. Encyclopedia of German Cinema. Berghahn Books, 2009.
