= Trix, the Romance of a Millionairess =

1921 film

- German film poster
- German: Trix, der Roman einer Millionärin
- Directed by: Frederic Zelnik
- Written by: Fanny Carlsen
- Produced by: Frederic Zelnik
- Starring: Lya Mara; Ernst Hofmann; Ilka Grüning
- Cinematography: Willy Goldberger
- Production company: Zelnik-Mara-Film
- Release date: 21 July 1921
- Country: Germany
- Languages: Silent; German intertitles

Trix, the Romance of a Millionairess (German: Trix, der Roman einer Millionärin) is a 1921 German silent romance film directed by Frederic Zelnik and starring Lya Mara, Ernst Hofmann, and Ilka Grüning. It premiered at the Marmorhaus in Berlin.

The film's sets were designed by the art director Fritz Lederer.

== Cast ==
- Lya Mara
- Ernst Hofmann
- Ilka Grüning
- Wilhelm Diegelmann
- Josefine Dora
- Albert Patry
- Johannes Riemann
- Fritz Ruhbeck
- Fritz Schulz
- Herma van Delden
- Vilma von Mayburg
