= The Convict of Cayenne =

1921 film

- Directed by: Léo Lasko
- Written by: Fanny Carlsen; Léo Lasko
- Produced by: Frederic Zelnik
- Starring: Frederic Zelnik; Loni Nest
- Cinematography: Willy Goldberger
- Production company: Zelnik-Mara-Film
- Release date: 15 September 1921
- Country: Germany
- Languages: Silent; German intertitles

The Convict of Cayenne (German: Der Sträfling von Cayenne) is a 1921 German silent drama film directed by Léo Lasko and starring Frederic Zelnik and Loni Nest. It premiered in Berlin at the Marmorhaus.

== Cast ==
In alphabetical order

- Julius Falkenstein
- Loni Nest
- Heinrich Peer
- Charles Puffy
- Albert Steinrück
- Emmy Sturm
- Herma van Delden
- Frederic Zelnik

== Bibliography ==
- Bock, Hans-Michael & Bergfelder, Tim. The Concise CineGraph. Encyclopedia of German Cinema. Berghahn Books, 2009.
