= The Big Shot (1922 film) =

- German: Der große Wurf
- Directed by: Georg Jacoby
- Written by: Alexander Alexander; Joseph Max Jacobi
- Starring: Hugo Fischer-Köppe; Wilhelm Diegelmann; Hugo Döblin
- Cinematography: Paul Holzki
- Production company: Imi-Film
- Release date: 20 October 1922
- Country: Germany
- Languages: Silent; German intertitles

The Big Shot (German: Der große Wurf) is a 1922 German silent film directed by Georg Jacoby and starring Hugo Fischer-Köppe, Wilhelm Diegelmann, and Hugo Döblin.

== Cast ==
- Hugo Fischer-Köppe as Schibinski
- Wilhelm Diegelmann as Sam Maajor
- Hugo Döblin as Ganewski
- Franz Groß as "Buttermilk"
- Albert Patry as Jakob
- Josef Commer as Jonathan
- Paul Westermeier as Emil Kopelke
- Leonhard Haskel as Onkel Max
- Fritz Beckmann as Onkel Moritz
- Fritz Schulz as BennoKlemm
- Carmen Illa as Dorchen
- Frida Richard as Röschen
- Mizzi Schütz as Auguste
- Olga Limburg as Clara
- Paul Walker as Hotelboy
- Willi Allen as Jonny
- Ilka Grüning as Frau Steinreich
- Ernst Hofmann as Eberhard Steinreich
