= Fadette =

1926 film

- Directed by: Frederic Zelnik
- Written by: George Sand (novel La Petite Fadette); Fanny Carlsen
- Starring: Lya Mara; Yvette Guilbert; Eugen Klöpfer
- Cinematography: Frederik Fuglsang; Friedrich Weinmann
- Music by: Willy Schmidt-Gentner
- Production company: Friedrich Zelnick-Film
- Distributed by: Deutsche Lichtspiel-Syndikat
- Release date: 1 December 1926
- Running time: 125 minutes
- Country: Germany
- Languages: Silent; German intertitles

Fadette (German: Die lachende Grille) is a 1926 German silent historical film directed by Frederic Zelnik and starring Lya Mara, Yvette Guilbert and Eugen Klöpfer. It was shot at the Staaken Studios in Berlin. The film's sets were designed by the art directors Andrej Andrejew and Alexander Ferenczy.

== Cast ==
- Lya Mara as Die kleine Fadette
- Yvette Guilbert as Die alte Fadette
- Eugen Klöpfer as Barbeau
- Harry Liedtke as Landry
- Ernö Verebes as Sylvaine
- Eugen Burg as Baron Rothschild
- Dagny Servaes as George Sand
- Alfred Abel as Chopin
- Rudolf Klein-Rogge as Rossini
- Max Grünberg as Heinrich Heine
- Hanns Waschatko as Paganini
- Ferdinand von Alten as the Duke of Orleans
- Wilhelm Diegelmann as Der Wirt
- Hermann Picha as Ein alter Bauer
- Harry Berber
- Karl Etlinger
- Karl Platen
- Berta Scheven
- Hans Heinrich von Twardowski

== Bibliography ==
- Grange, William. Cultural Chronicle of the Weimar Republic. Scarecrow Press, 2008.
