= Mary Lou (1928 film) =

1928 film

- Directed by: Frederic Zelnik
- Written by: Fanny Carlsen
- Starring: Lya Mara; Fred Louis Lerch; Ivan Koval-Samborsky
- Cinematography: Arthur Martinelli
- Music by: Werner Schmidt-Boelcke
- Production company: Deutsche Film Union
- Distributed by: Deutsche First National Pictures
- Release date: 24 September 1928
- Country: Germany
- Languages: Silent; German intertitles

Mary Lou (German:Mary-Lou) is a 1928 German silent film directed by Frederic Zelnik and starring Lya Mara, Fred Louis Lerch and Ivan Koval-Samborsky.

The film's art direction was by Andrej Andrejew. It was released by the German branch of First National Pictures.

== Cast ==
- Lya Mara as Mary-Lou
- Fred Louis Lerch as Felix Rimsky
- Ivan Koval-Samborsky as Rigoletto
- Fritz Kampers as Belloni
- Adele Sandrock as Frau Belloni
- Hans Mierendorff as Großfürst Dimitri
- Rudolf Biebrach as Kapitän Lund
- S.Z. Sakall as Der Jongleur
- Harry Grunwald
- Max Maximilian as Strolch
- Paul Rehkopf as Strolch
- Bobby Burns as Bobby

== Bibliography ==
- Bock, Hans-Michael & Bergfelder, Tim. The Concise CineGraph. Encyclopedia of German Cinema. Berghahn Books, 2009.
