= Women You Rarely Greet =

1925 film

- German: Frauen, die man oft nicht grüßt
- Directed by: Frederic Zelnik
- Written by: Hans Behrendt; Helmuth Orthmann
- Produced by: Frederic Zelnik
- Starring: Lya Mara; Alfons Fryland; Leo Connard
- Cinematography: Frederik Fuglsang
- Production company: Zelnik-Film
- Distributed by: Süd-Film
- Release date: 11 September 1925
- Country: Germany
- Languages: Silent; German intertitles

Women You Rarely Greet (German: Frauen, die man oft nicht grüßt) is a 1925 German silent film directed by Frederic Zelnik and starring Lya Mara, Alfons Fryland, and Leo Connard.

== Cast ==
- Lya Mara as Nina
- Alfons Fryland as Fred Wigram
- Leo Connard as Consul Bernd Wigram
- Olga Engl as Fred's mother
- Margarete Kupfer as Nina's mother
- Elena Lunda as Lo, Nina's friend
- Hertha von Walther as Mieze
- Oreste Bilancia as Maier
- Carl Geppert as Schulze
- Paul Gunther as Arno Beslar
- Paul Otto as Hubert Strehlen
- Hanni Reinwald as Mariechen Hindersen
- Viktor Senger as Wilhelm Mechelke
- Gyula Szőreghy as Benvenuto Griebe
