= Yoshiwara (1920 film) =

1920 film

- Directed by: Arthur Bergen
- Written by: Arthur Bergen
- Produced by: Frederic Zelnik
- Starring: Lya Mara; Heinrich Schroth
- Release date: 1920
- Country: Germany
- Languages: Silent; German intertitles

Yoshiwara (German:Yoshiwara, die Liebesstadt der Japaner) is a 1920 German silent film directed by Arthur Bergen and starring Lya Mara and Heinrich Schroth.

== Cast ==
- Lya Mara as Geisha Toyu
- Heinrich Schroth as Arzt und Forscher
- Arthur Bergen as Dr. Kitamaru
- Reinhold Köstlin
- Henri Peters-Arnolds
- Joseph Römer
- Anita Berber

== Bibliography ==
- Hans-Michael Bock and Tim Bergfelder. The Concise Cinegraph: An Encyclopedia of German Cinema. Berghahn Books.
