= Fanny Elssler (1920 film) =

1920 film

- German: Die Erlebnisse der berühmten Tänzerin Fanny Elßler
- Directed by: Frederic Zelnik
- Written by: Hans Adler; Fanny Carlsen; Bernard Grun; Oskar Stalla
- Produced by: Frederic Zelnik
- Starring: Lya Mara; Ernst Hofmann; Rudolf Forster
- Cinematography: Willy Goldberger
- Production company: Zelnik-Mara-Film
- Release date: 3 August 1920
- Country: Germany
- Languages: Silent; German intertitles

Fanny Elssler (German: Die Erlebnisse der berühmten Tänzerin Fanny Elßler) is a 1920 German historical film directed by Friedrich Zelnik and starring Lya Mara, Ernst Hofmann, and Rudolf Forster. It is based on the life of the nineteenth century Austrian dancer Fanny Elssler.

The film's sets were designed by the art director Fritz Lederer.

== Cast ==
- Lya Mara as Fanny Elssler
- Ernst Hofmann as Herzog von Reichstadt
- Rudolf Forster as Gentz
- Heinrich Peer as Metternich
- Josef Reithofer as Lord Ebester
- Ilka Grüning
- Karl Harbacher
- Hilde Arndt
- Karl Platen
