= The Princess of the Nile =

1920 film

- Directed by: Martin Zickel
- Produced by: Frederic Zelnik
- Starring: Lya Mara; Julius Falkenstein; Lotte Stein
- Cinematography: Willy Goldberger
- Production company: Berliner Film-Manufaktur
- Release date: May 1920
- Country: Germany
- Languages: Silent; German intertitles

The Princess of the Nile (German: Die Prinzessin vom Nil) is a 1920 German silent comedy film directed by Martin Zickel and starring Lya Mara, Julius Falkenstein and Lotte Stein.

The film's sets were designed by the art director Artur Günther.

== Cast ==
In alphabetical order

- Franz Cornelius as Zeddelmann
- Johanna Ewald as Eulalia
- Julius Falkenstein as Faktotum
- Piggy Germont as Asta
- Paul Graetz as Thobin
- Siegwart Gruder as König Rhamses
- Hugo Hummel as Schutzmann
- Lya Mara as Naomi
- Heinrich Peer as Graf Gamaleja
- Karl Platen as Dr. Thesaurus
- Josef Reithofer as Sklave
- Eugen Rex as Assessor Erich
- Gerhard Ritterband as Emil
- Lotte Stein as Minna
- Ellen Ullri as Göttin

== Bibliography ==
- Bock, Hans-Michael & Bergfelder, Tim. The Concise CineGraph. Encyclopedia of German Cinema. Berghahn Books, 2009.
