= Charlotte Corday (1919 film) =

1919 film

- Directed by: Frederic Zelnik
- Produced by: Frederic Zelnik
- Starring: Lya Mara; Hermann Vallentin
- Production company: Berliner Film
- Release date: February 1919
- Country: Germany
- Languages: Silent; German intertitles

Charlotte Corday is a 1919 German silent historical drama film directed by Frederic Zelnik and starring Lya Mara and Hermann Vallentin. No surviving copies are known.

== Cast ==
- Lya Mara as Charlotte Corday
- Hermann Vallentin
- Wiktor Biegański
- Hermann Seldeneck
