= The Knitting Needles =

1916 German silent comedy film

- Directed by: Hubert Moest; Otto Rippert
- Written by: Heinrich Lautensack; August von Kotzebue (play)
- Starring: Erich Kaiser-Titz; Käthe Haack; Olga Engl
- Cinematography: Hans Kämpfe
- Production company: Lloyd-Film
- Release date: 8 December 1916
- Country: Germany
- Languages: Silent; German intertitles

The Knitting Needles (German: Die Stricknadeln) is a 1916 German silent comedy film directed by Hubert Moest and Otto Rippert and starring Erich Kaiser-Titz, Käthe Haack and Olga Engl.

== Cast ==
- Erich Kaiser-Titz as August von Kotzebue / Baron
- Käthe Haack as Junge Baronin
- Olga Engl as Alte Baronin
- Reinhold Schünzel
- Josef Coenen]
- Lina Salten

== Bibliography ==
- Bock, Hans-Michael & Bergfelder, Tim. The Concise CineGraph. Encyclopedia of German Cinema. Berghahn Books, 2009.
