= The Heiress of the Count of Monte Cristo =

1919 film

- German: Die Erbin des Grafen von Monte Christo
- Directed by: Frederic Zelnik
- Written by: Matthias Blank (novel)
- Produced by: Frederic Zelnik
- Starring: Lya Mara; Werner Funck; Vilma von Mayburg
- Cinematography: Willy Goldberger
- Production company: Berliner Film-Manufaktur
- Release date: December 1919
- Country: Germany
- Languages: Silent; German intertitles

The Heiress of the Count of Monte Cristo (German: Die Erbin des Grafen von Monte Christo) is a 1919 German silent film directed by Frederic Zelnik and starring Lya Mara, Werner Funck, and Vilma von Mayburg.

The film's sets were designed by the art director Artur Günther.

== Cast ==
- Lya Mara as Helene Montfort
- Werner Funck as Jean de Renard
- Vilma von Mayburg as Frau von Renard
- Aenderly Lebius
- Hermann Vallentin as Advokat Dubarry
- Hugo Falke as Richard de Renard
- Harry Berber as Herr Scharlan
- Tonia Gudowicy as Tochter Renard
- Edwin Schäfer
