= The Doomed (film) =

1924 film

- Directed by: Eugen Illés
- Written by: Eugen Illés
- Starring: Bernd Aldor; Sascha Gura; Erich Kaiser-Titz
- Cinematography: Franz Stein
- Production company: National Film
- Distributed by: National Film
- Release date: 9 February 1924
- Country: Germany
- Languages: Silent; German intertitles

The Doomed (German: Die Todgeweihten) is a 1924 German silent drama film directed by Eugen Illés and starring Bernd Aldor, Sascha Gura and Erich Kaiser-Titz.

The film's sets were designed by Illés and the art director Artur Günther

== Cast ==
- Bernd Aldor as Artur Rys, Großindustrieller
- Sascha Gura as Gladys, seine Schwester
- Erich Kaiser-Titz as Ingenieur Ohlsen
- Arthur Kraußneck as Mathimatiker Robin
- Maria Zelenka as Renate, seine Tochter
- Eugen Rex as Prinz d'Orlando
- Jaro Fürth as der Abgeordneter Korell
- Franz Schönfeld as Kriegsminsiter

== Bibliography ==
- Alfred Krautz. International directory of cinematographers, set- and costume designers in film, Volume 4. Saur, 1984.
