= Darling of the King =

1924 film

- Directed by: Heinz Schall
- Starring: Ruth Weyher; Elisabeth Pinajeff; Bruno Kastner
- Cinematography: Otto Kanturek
- Production company: Fulmen-Film
- Distributed by: Boston Film
- Release date: 28 September 1924
- Country: Germany
- Languages: Silent; German intertitles

Darling of the King (German: Königsliebchen) is a 1924 German silent film directed by Heinz Schall and starring Ruth Weyher, Elisabeth Pinajeff and Bruno Kastner.

The film's sets were designed by the art director Hermann Warm and Gustav A. Knauer.

== Cast ==
- Ruth Weyher
- Elisabeth Pinajeff
- Bruno Kastner
- Robert Scholz
- Hans Junkermann
- Julia Serda
- Erich Kaiser-Titz
- Sophie Pagay
- Paula Eberty
- Philipp Manning
- Lantelme Dürer
- Hermann Picha
- Lydia Potechina
- Hermann Vallentin
- Hugo Döblin
- Luigi Serventi
- Joseph Klein

== Bibliography ==
- Bock, Hans-Michael & Bergfelder, Tim. The Concise CineGraph. Encyclopedia of German Cinema. Berghahn Books, 2009.
