= The Girl from Capri =

1924 film

- German: Das Mädel von Capri
- Directed by: Frederic Zelnik
- Written by: Frederic Zelnik
- Produced by: Frederic Zelnik
- Starring: Lya Mara; Ulrich Bettac; Robert Scholz; Hermann Böttcher
- Cinematography: Mutz Greenbaum; Gustave Preiss
- Production company: Zelnik-Mara-Film
- Distributed by: National Film
- Release date: October 1924
- Country: Germany
- Languages: Silent; German intertitles

The Girl from Capri (German: Das Mädel von Capri) is a 1924 German silent comedy film directed by Frederic Zelnik and starring Lya Mara, Ulrich Bettac and Robert Scholz. It premiered in Berlin on 10 July 1924.

== Cast ==
- Lya Mara
- Ulrich Bettac
- Robert Scholz
- Hermann Böttcher
- Julia Serda
