= The Creature (film) =

1924 film

- Directed by: Siegfried Philippi
- Written by: Hermann Wagner
- Produced by: Josef Rideg
- Starring: Charlotte Ander; Alfons Fryland; Erich Kaiser-Titz
- Cinematography: Mutz Greenbaum
- Production company: Josef Rideg Film
- Distributed by: Süd-Film
- Release date: May 1924
- Country: Germany
- Languages: Silent; German intertitles

The Creature (German: Das Geschöpf) is a 1924 German silent film directed by Siegfried Philippi and starring Charlotte Ander, Alfons Fryland, and Erich Kaiser-Titz.

The film's sets were designed by the art director Kurt Richter.

== Cast ==
- Charlotte Ander
- Alfons Fryland
- Erich Kaiser-Titz
- Ilka Grüning
- Olga Engl
- Rudolf Lettinger
- Albert Paulig
- Gertrude Welcker

== Bibliography ==
- Bock, Hans-Michael; Bergfelder, Tim, eds. (2009). The Concise Cinegraph: Encyclopaedia of German Cinema. New York: Berghahn Books. ISBN 978-1-57181-655-9.
