= The Mistress of Monbijou =

1924 film

- German: Die Herrin von Monbijou
- Directed by: Frederic Zelnik
- Written by: Fanny Carlsen
- Produced by: Frederic Zelnik
- Starring: Lya Mara; Hermann Böttcher
- Cinematography: Mutz Greenbaum
- Production company: Zelnik-Mara-Film
- Release date: 5 June 1924
- Country: Germany
- Languages: Silent; German intertitles

The Mistress of Monbijou (German: Die Herrin von Monbijou) is a 1924 German silent romance film directed by Frederic Zelnik and starring Lya Mara and Hermann Böttcher.

== Cast ==
- Ulrich Bettac
- Hermann Böttcher
- Lya Mara
- Albert Patry
- Julia Serda
