= The Buried Self =

1921 film

- Directed by: Léo Lasko
- Written by: Fanny Carlsen; Léo Lasko
- Produced by: Frederic Zelnik
- Starring: Frederic Zelnik; Wilhelm Diegelmann
- Cinematography: Willy Goldberger
- Production company: Zelnik-Mara-Film
- Release date: 1 December 1921
- Country: Germany
- Languages: Silent; German intertitles

The Buried Self (German: Das begrabene Ich) is a 1921 German silent drama film directed by Léo Lasko and starring Frederic Zelnik and Wilhelm Diegelmann.

The film's sets were designed by the art director Fritz Lederer. Location shooting took place around Danzig.

== Cast ==
- Frederic Zelnik
- Albert Patry
- Robert Scholz
- Lia Eibenschütz
- Fritz Schroeter
- Wilhelm Diegelmann
- Emmy Sturm
- Josef Commer
- Alexander Areuss
- Paul Passarge

== Bibliography ==
- Bock, Hans-Michael & Bergfelder, Tim. The Concise CineGraph. Encyclopedia of German Cinema. Berghahn Books, 2009.
