= Marionettes of the Princess =

1924 film

- German: Die Marionetten der Fürstin
- Directed by: Frederic Zelnik
- Written by: Frederic Zelnik
- Produced by: Frederic Zelnik
- Starring: Gertrude Welcker; Rudolf Forster; Erich Kaiser-Titz
- Production company: Zelnik-Mara-Film
- Release date: 9 January 1924
- Country: Germany
- Languages: Silent; German intertitles

Marionettes of the Princess (German: Die Marionetten der Fürstin) is a 1924 German silent drama film directed by Frederic Zelnik and starring Gertrude Welcker, Rudolf Forster and Erich Kaiser-Titz.

== Cast ==
- Gertrude Welcker
- Rudolf Forster
- Erich Kaiser-Titz
- Maria Forescu
- Anton Pointner
- Frederic Zelnik
