= The Sailor Perugino =

1924 film

- Directed by: Frederic Zelnik
- Written by: Fanny Carlsen
- Produced by: Frederic Zelnik
- Starring: Anton Pointner; Heinz Schröder; Hans Brausewetter
- Cinematography: Otto Tober
- Production company: Zelnik-Mara-Film
- Release date: 13 March 1924
- Country: Germany
- Languages: Silent; German intertitles

The Sailor Perugino (German: Der Matrose Perugino) is a 1924 German silent drama film directed by Frederic Zelnik and starring Anton Pointner, Heinz Schröder and Hans Brausewetter.

The film's sets were designed by the art director Georg Meyer.

== Cast ==
- Anton Pointner
- Heinz Schröder
- Hans Brausewetter
- Josef Commer
- Albert Patry
- Frederic Zelnik

== Bibliography ==
- Alfred Krautz. International directory of cinematographers, set- and costume designers in film, Volume 4. Saur, 1984.
