= Symphony of Death (film) =

1921 film directed by Dimitri Buchowetzki

- Directed by: Dimitri Buchowetzki
- Written by: Harald Bredow; Dimitri Buchowetzki
- Starring: Robert Scholz; Bernhard Goetzke; Hanni Weisse
- Cinematography: Arpad Viragh
- Production company: Fantos-Film
- Release date: 24 August 1921
- Country: Germany
- Languages: Silent; German intertitles

Symphony of Death (German: Symphonie des Todes) is a 1921 German silent film directed by Dimitri Buchowetzki and starring Robert Scholz, Bernhard Goetzke and Hanni Weisse.

The film's sets were designed by the art director Willi Herrmann and Gennaro Righelli.

== Cast ==
- Robert Scholz as Sven Garden, Arzt
- Bernhard Goetzke as Olaf Hansen, Geiger
- Olga Engl as Frau Holgersen
- Hanni Weisse as Helga, ihre Tochter
- Otto Treptow as Petersen, Reporter
- Harald Bredow as Samuelson

== Bibliography ==
- Steve Choe. Life and Death in the Cinema of Weimar Germany, 1919–1924. University of California, Berkeley, 2008.
