= The Game of Love (1924 film) =

1924 film

- Directed by: Guido Parish
- Written by: Guido Parish
- Produced by: Marcella Albani; Max Nivelli
- Starring: Marcella Albani; Alfred Abel; Carl de Vogt
- Cinematography: Edoardo Lamberti; Achille Nani
- Production companies: Albani Film; Nivo-Film
- Distributed by: Nivo-Film
- Release date: February 1924
- Country: Germany
- Languages: Silent; German intertitles

The Game of Love (German: Das Spiel der Liebe) is a 1924 German silent film directed by Guido Parish and starring Marcella Albani, Alfred Abel, and Carl de Vogt.

The film's sets were designed by the art director August Rinaldi.

== Cast ==
- Marcella Albani as Marcella
- Alfred Abel as Karl Sörensen, ein Industrieller
- Carl de Vogt as Georg, Ingenieur
- Carl Auen as Sekretär bei Sörensen
- Erich Kaiser-Titz as der Graf, Marcellas Vater
- Leonhard Haskel as ein Gläubiger
- Hugo Döblin as Notar
- Josefine Dora as Wirtschafterin
- Loni Pyrmont as Margit, Sörensens Schwester
- Johanna Ewald as Pensionsvorsteherin

== Bibliography ==
- Bock, Hans-Michael; Bergfelder, Tim, eds. (2009). The Concise Cinegraph: Encyclopaedia of German Cinema. New York: Berghahn Books. ISBN 978-1-57181-655-9.
