= Olga Engl =

Austrian actress (1871–1946)

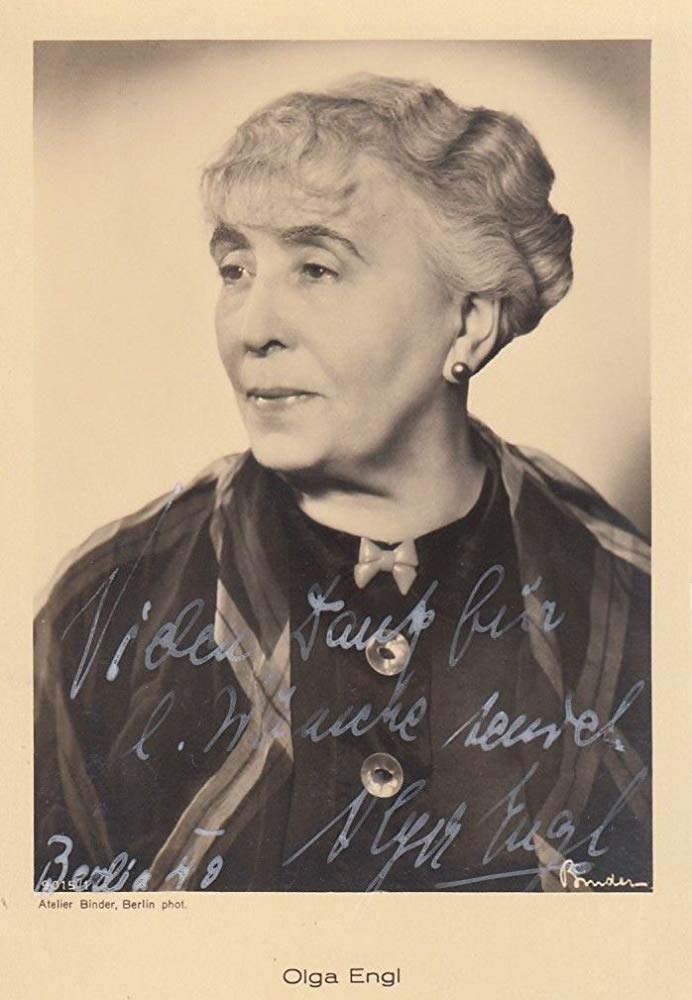
- Engl in 1925
- Born: 30 May 1871; Prague, Austria-Hungary (present-day Czech Republic)
- Died: 21 September 1946 (aged 75); Berlin, Allied-occupied Germany
- Occupation: Actress
- Years active: 1887–1945

Olga Engl (30 May 1871 – 21 September 1946) was an Austrian-German stage and motion picture actress who appeared in nearly 200 films.

== Biography ==
Engl was privately educated in an Ursuline monastery and began her acting career at the Prague Conservatory. In August 1887 she made her stage début as Bertha in the play Die Verschwörung des Fiesco zu Genua in her home town. In 1888, she moved to the city of Danzig and performed in the theatre from 1889 to 1892 then briefly moved to Berlin. From 1892 to 1895 she performed with the court theatre in Munich and from 1895 to 1897 in Hamburg at the Thalia Theater, and from 1897 in Hanover.

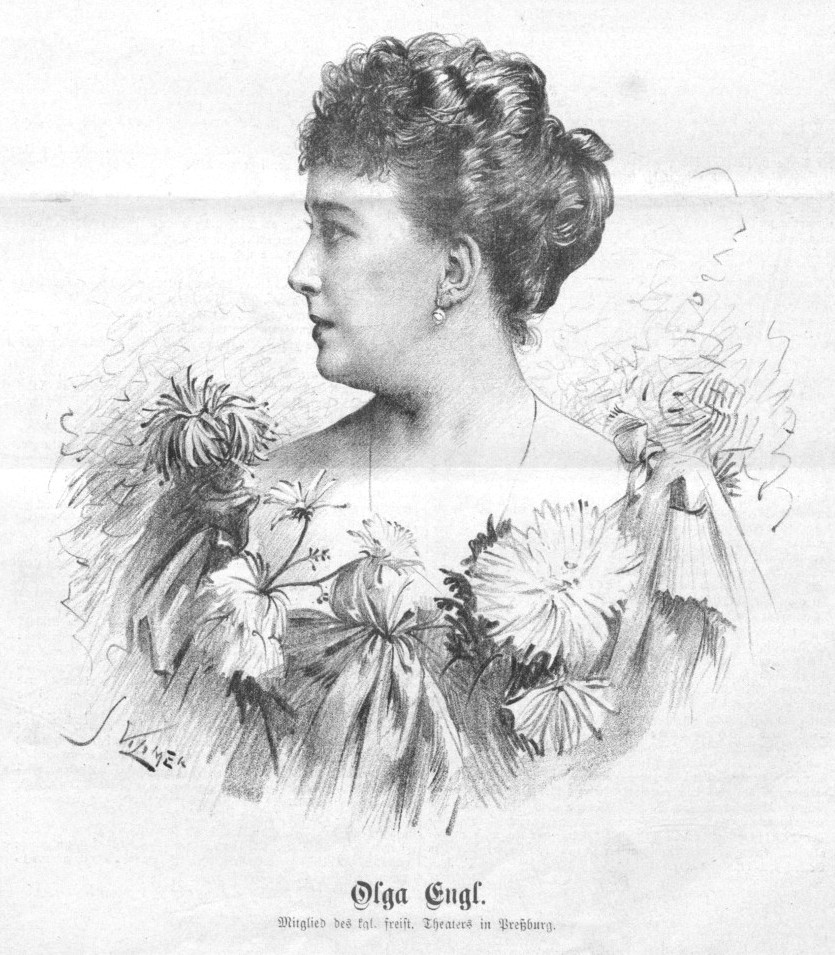
Engl in the late 1890s

Engl made her film debut in the 1911 British silent film The Adoptive Child then returned to Germany and began appearing in German film productions. Her first major role was in the 1913 Carl Froelich-directed biopic Richard Wagner. She would work continually throughout the 1910s and appear in a variety of roles for such directors as Urban Gad and Frederic Zelnik and opposite such popular actors of the era as Emil Jannings, Alfred Abel and Lya Mara. By the early 1920s, Engl's career in motion pictures was well established. In 1922 she appeared in the popular F.W. Murnau-directed eerie drama Phantom opposite Alfred Abel, Grete Berger, Aud Egede-Nissen, Lya De Putti and Lil Dagover.

Engl transitioned to the talkie era with relative ease and she often appeared in films as a "Grand Dame" type of character. Some of her most enduring roles of the early talkie era were the 1931 Gerhard Lamprecht-directed adventure Emil und die Detektive and the musical Der Kongreß tanzt (English: The Congress Dances), also released in 1931 and starring Lilian Harvey, Conrad Veidt, and Lil Dagover. In 1933 she made her English language film debut in the Edwin H. Knopf and Luis Trenker-directed The Rebel. The film starred Hungarian actors Vilma Bánky and Victor Varconi and was a remake of Der Rebell, also featuring Engl and released earlier the same year and also directed by Trenker.

Engl continued to act through the World War II era – appearing in ten films between 1939 and 1945. Her last film appearance before retiring was a small role in the drama Das Alte Lied, which was released in March 1945. In addition to film roles, she continued acting on Berlin stages until shortly before her death in 1946.

== Selected filmography ==
- The Man in the Cellar (1914)
- Bubi Is Jealous (1916)
- The Knitting Needles (1916)
- Under the Spell of Silence (1916)
- The Rat (1918)
- Cain (1918)
- Ikarus, the Flying Man (1918)
- The Enchanted Princess (1919)
- The Foolish Heart (1919)
- Blonde Poison (1919)
- Out of the Depths (1919)
- Between Two Worlds (1919)
- The Last Sun Son (1919)
- Crown and Whip (1919)
- Veritas Vincit (1919)
- Madeleine (1919)
- Irrlicht (1919)
- The Commandment of Love (1919)
- The Girl from Acker Street (1920)
- The Black Count (1920)
- From the Files of a Respectable Woman (1920)
- Count Varenne's Lover (1921)
- Symphony of Death (1921)
- The Women of Gnadenstein (1921)
- The Last Witness (1921)
- The Amazon (1921)
- Miss Beryll (1921)
- The Story of a Maid (1921)
- A Woman's Revenge (1921)
- The Black Spider (1921)
- You Are the Life (1921)
- Monte Carlo (1921)
- Rose of the Asphalt Streets (1922)
- The Marriage of Princess Demidoff (1922)
- The Circle of Death (1922)
- Your Bad Reputation (1922)
- Only One Night (1922)
- Bigamy (1922)
- Louise de Lavallière (1922)
- The Island of Tears (1923)
- Irene of Gold (1923)
- Count Cohn (1923)
- Daisy (1923)
- The Pilgrimage of Love (1923)
- Resurrection (1923)
- Playing with Destiny (1924)
- Slaves of Love (1924)
- Nelly, the Bride Without a Husband (1924)
- The Creature (1924)
- The Golden Calf (1925)
- Women You Rarely Greet (1925)
- The Woman without Money (1925)
- Nick, King of the Chauffeurs (1925)
- The Salesgirl from the Fashion Store (1925)
- The Dice Game of Life (1925)
- Ash Wednesday (1925)
- The Circus Princess (1925)
- The Blue Danube (1926)
- The Girl on a Swing (1926)
- The Circus of Life (1926)
- Trude (1926)
- Hell of Love (1926)
- We'll Meet Again in the Heimat (1926)
- The Pride of the Company (1926)
- A Sister of Six (1926)
- Manon Lescaut (1926)
- The Good Reputation (1926)
- The Mistress (1927)
- Dancing Vienna (1927)
- On the Banks of the River Weser (1927)
- The Pink Slippers (1927)
- Benno Stehkragen (1927)
- The Harbour Bride (1927)
- When the Young Wine Blossoms (1927)
- That Was Heidelberg on Summer Nights (1927)
- Rinaldo Rinaldini (1927)
- Anastasia, the False Czar's Daughter (1928)
- Sir or Madam (1928)
- It Attracted Three Fellows (1928)
- Girls, Beware! (1928)
- Love's Masquerade (1928)
- The Lady from Argentina (1928)
- Column X (1929)
- They May Not Marry (1929)
- High Treason (1929)
- The Little Escapade (1931)
- Shadows of the Underworld (1931)
- Emil and the Detectives (1931)
- The Rebel (1932)
- Greetings and Kisses, Veronika (1933)
- The Sandwich Girl (1933)
- Scandal in Budapest (1933)
- So Ended a Great Love (1934)
- You Are Adorable, Rosmarie (1934)
- Music in the Blood (1934)
- The English Marriage (1934)
- The Csardas Princess (1934)
- Regine (1935)
- A Night on the Danube (1935)
- Dreams of Love (1935)
- City of Anatol (1936)
- Family Parade (1936)
- The Man Who Couldn't Say No (1938)
- The Blue Fox (1938)
- Counterfeiters (1940)
- Clarissa (1941)
- Mistress Moon (1941)
- The Great Love (1942)
- Doctor Crippen (1942)
- The Eternal Tone (1943)
- The Court Concert (1948)
