= Playing with Destiny =

1924 film

- Directed by: Siegfried Philippi
- Written by: Paul Beyer; Paul Frank (novel)
- Starring: Alfred Abel; Sascha Gura; Claire Rommer
- Cinematography: Marius Holdt
- Production company: Berliner Film
- Release date: 16 June 1924
- Country: Germany
- Languages: Silent; German intertitles

Playing with Destiny (German: Das Spiel mit dem Schicksal) is a 1924 German silent film directed by Siegfried Philippi and starring Alfred Abel, Sascha Gura and Claire Rommer.

The film's sets were designed by the art director Robert A. Dietrich.

== Cast ==
- Alfred Abel as Albert Unna
- Sascha Gura as Eva Loray
- Olga Engl as Alberts Mutter
- Claire Rommer as Elena
- Margarete Kupfer as Mittenzweys Freundin
- Vera Skidelsky as Beider Tochter
- Charles Willy Kayser as Friedrich Bessel
- Fritz Schulz as Heinrich Höther
- Rudolf Lettinger as Ortsgeistlicher
- Jakob Tiedtke as Redakteur Mittenzwey
- Frida Richard as Dessen Frau
- Leopold von Ledebur as Theaterdirektor
- Hermann Picha as Jerusalem
- Fritz Beckmann
- Paul Rehkopf

== Bibliography ==
- Bock, Hans-Michael & Bergfelder, Tim. The Concise CineGraph. Encyclopedia of German Cinema. Berghahn Books, 2009.
- Gerhard Lamprecht. Deutsche Stummfilme, Volume 8.
