= The Women of Gnadenstein =

1921 film by Robert Dinesen and Joe May

- German: Frauen vom Gnadenstein
- Directed by: Robert Dinesen; Joe May
- Written by: Thea von Harbou; Joe May
- Produced by: Joe May
- Starring: Erich Kaiser-Titz; Margarete Schön; Grete Diercks
- Cinematography: Sophus Wangøe
- Production company: May-Film
- Distributed by: UFA
- Release date: 21 January 1921
- Country: Germany
- Languages: Silent; German intertitles

The Women of Gnadenstein (German: Frauen vom Gnadenstein) is a 1921 German silent drama film directed by Robert Dinesen and Joe May and starring Erich Kaiser-Titz, Margarete Schön and Grete Diercks. The film was produced in 1920, but was not passed for censorship and screening until early 1921.

The film's sets were designed by the art director Otto Hunte.

== Cast ==
- Grete Diercks as Rose Marie Schlegel
- Olga Engl
- Leopold Gadiel
- Harry Hardt
- Erich Kaiser-Titz as Baron Werner von Dierckhoff
- Adolf Klein as Pfarrer
- Hedwig Lehmann
- Paul Passarge
- Hans Adalbert Schlettow as Fred Hagen
- Margarete Schön as Ruth
- Hedy Searle

== Bibliography ==
- Nelmes, Jill & Selbo, Jule. Women Screenwriters: An International Guide. Palgrave Macmillan, 2015. ISBN 113731236X.
