= Malva (1924 film) =

1924 film

- Directed by: Robert Dinesen
- Written by: Robert Dinesen; Rolf E. Vanloo
- Starring: Lya De Putti; Hans Adalbert Schlettow; Ernst Rückert
- Cinematography: Julius Balting
- Music by: Bruno Schulz
- Production company: Phoebus Film
- Distributed by: Phoebus Film
- Release date: 24 October 1924
- Country: Germany
- Languages: Silent; German intertitles

Malva is a 1924 German silent film directed by Robert Dinesen and starring Lya De Putti, Hans Adalbert Schlettow and Ernst Rückert.

== Cast ==
- Lya De Putti as Malva
- Hans Adalbert Schlettow as Tadzio
- Ernst Rückert as Tassilo
- Erich Kaiser-Titz as Gregori
- Tronier Funder as Bosco

== Bibliography ==
- Bock, Hans-Michael & Bergfelder, Tim. The Concise CineGraph. Encyclopedia of German Cinema. Berghahn Books, 2009.
