= Paul Holzki =

German cinematographer

Paul Holzki (28 September 1887 in Saadan, Ortelsburg district - 26 January 1960) was a German cinematographer. He worked with Leni Riefenstahl on the 1938 documentary Olympia.

== Selected filmography ==
- Violet (1921)
- The Eternal Curse (1921)
- The Black Panther (1921)
- Die schwarze Paula (1922)
- Die Kreutzersonate (1922)
- The Big Shot (1922)
- The Mistress of the King (1922)
- Insulted and Humiliated (1922)
- The Marriage of Princess Demidoff (1922)
- Yvette, the Fashion Princess (1922)
- Gold and Luck (1923)
- The Girl from Hell (1923)
- The Little Duke (1924)
- Goetz von Berlichingen of the Iron Hand (1925)
- The Doll of Luna Park (1925)
- Golden Boy (1925)
- White Slave Traffic (1926)
- Endangered Girls (1927)
- The Standard-Bearer of Sedan (1927)
- Mach' mir die Welt zum Paradies (1930)
- The Last Performance of the Circus Wolfson (1928)
- Big City Children (1929)

== Bibliography ==
- Rother, Rainer & Bott, Martin H. Leni Riefenstahl: The Seduction of Genius.Continuum International Publishing 2003.
