= Carl Auen =

German actor (1892–1972)

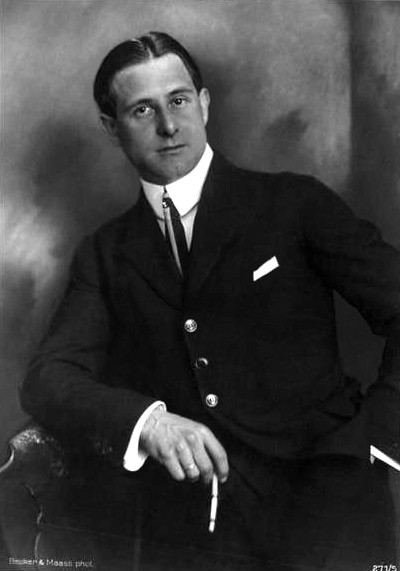
- Born: 16 February 1892; Düsseldorf, Rhine Province, German Empire
- Died: 23 June 1972 (aged 80); Lichterfelde, West Berlin, West Germany
- Occupation: Actor
- Years active: 1914–1938

Carl Theodor Auen (16 February 1892 – 23 June 1972) was a German film actor of the silent era. He appeared in more than 110 films between 1914 and 1938. He was a member of the Militant League for German Culture and served on the Advisory Council (Präsidialrat) Reichsfilmkammer president.

== Selected filmography ==
- Die geheimnisvolle Villa (1914)
- The Dagger of Malaya (1919)
- The Panther Bride (1919)
- The Swabian Maiden (1919)
- The Howling Wolf (1919)
- The Sins of the Mother (1921)
- The Shadow of Gaby Leed (1921)
- The Diadem of the Czarina (1922)
- The Cigarette Countess (1922)
- The Unwritten Law (1922)
- Lyda Ssanin (1923)
- The Men of Sybill (1923)
- The Girl from Hell (1923)
- Set Me Free (1924)
- The Game of Love (1924)
- The Old Ballroom (1925)
- The Fire Dancer (1925)
- Golden Boy (1925)
- Ash Wednesday (1925)
- The Sea Cadet (1926)
- Annemarie and Her Cavalryman (1926)
- The Woman from the Folies Bergères (1927)
- On the Banks of the River Weser (1927)
- The Girl from Abroad (1927)
- The False Prince (1927)
- Tragedy at the Royal Circus (1928)
- Master and Mistress (1928)
- Only a Viennese Woman Kisses Like That (1928)
- Because I Love You (1928)
- Perjury (1929)
- Death Drive for the World Record (1929)
- Youth of the Big City (1929)
- The Customs Judge (1929)
- Lux, King of Criminals (1929)
- Archduke John (1929)
- Sin and Morality (1929)
- Distinguishing Features (1929)
- Affair at the Grand Hotel (1929)
- Big City Children (1929)
- The Man in the Dark (1930)
- Marshal Forwards (1932)
- Tannenberg (1932)
- The Invisible Front (1932)
- All is at Stake (1932)
- A Song Goes Round the World (1933)
- The Flower of Hawaii (1933)
- What Women Dream (1933)
- Little Man, What Now? (1933)
- The Country Schoolmaster (1933)
- Schlußakkord (1936)
- Hilde and the Volkswagen (1936)
- Donogoo Tonka (1936)
- Orders Are Orders (1936)
- Savoy Hotel 217 (1936)
- Stronger Than Regulations (1936)
- Maria the Maid (1936)
- To New Shores (1937)
- The Glass Ball (1937)
- My Son the Minister (1937)
- Togger (1937)
- The Indian Tomb (1938)
- The Tiger of Eschnapur (1938)
