= Lya Mara =

Polish actress (1897–1960)

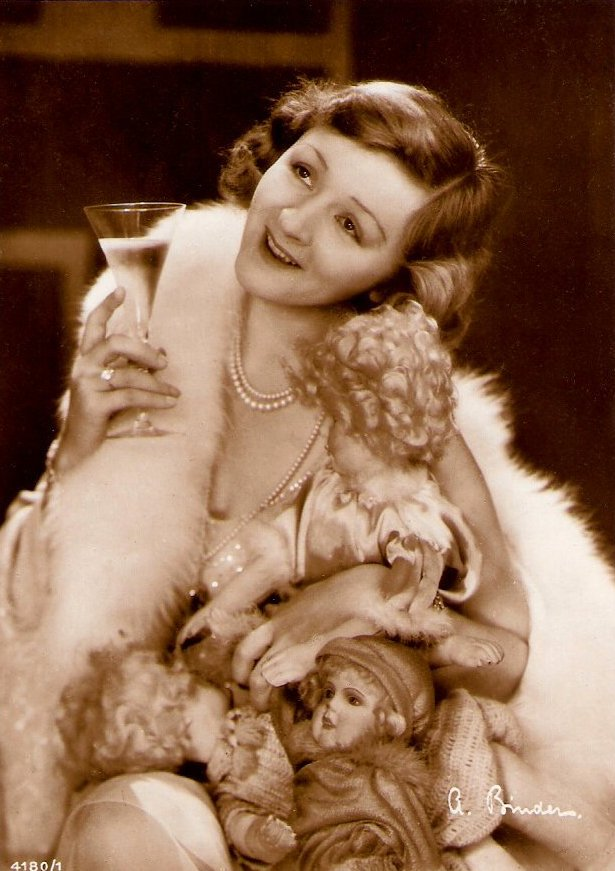
- Born: Aleksandra Gudowicz; 1 August 1897; Riga, Governorate of Livonia, Russian Empire
- Died: 1 March 1960 (aged 62); Canton of Ticino, Switzerland
- Years active: 1916–1931
- Spouse: Frederic Zelnik (m. 1918; died 1950)

Lya Mara (born Aleksandra Gudowicz; 1 August 1897 – 1 March 1960) was a Polish actress. She was one of the biggest stars of the German silent cinema.

== Biography ==
Lya Mara was born Aleksandra Gudowicz in a Polish family in Riga, Governorate of Livonia. As a young girl she wanted to become a chemist, as then famous Maria Skłodowska-Curie. In 1913, just before World War I, Lya Mara moved with her family to Warsaw, as Poland and Latvia were part of the Russian Empire. There, she began her career as a dancer.

In Warsaw, Lya Mara played her first small part in a short fiction silent film under a characteristically simplified title We want husband (1916, as Mia Mara) and soon after in another film Bestia (The Beast, premiere on 5 January 1917) directed by a Polish director of older generation Alexander Hertz. Another Polish actress, Pola Negri, who later made an extraordinary career in Germany and in America, was the star of this film. Soon after that film, Negri left for Berlin and Lya Mara followed her steps. This occurred during World War I and after Poland was occupied in 1915 by the Germans, it became a part of the German Empire.

Lya Mara's first film in Germany was Halkas Gelöbnis (1918) directed by an Austrian director Alfred Halm, who also scripted her another film Jadwiga. Both films were produced by young and energetic director-producer Frederic Zelnik. Lya Mara married him in 1918.

Zelnik promoted Mara to a major star in Germany as she played mainly in films he directed and produced. In 1920, Zelnik's film production company was named Zelnik-Mara-Film GmbH. Mara played important parts such as Charlotte Corday, Anna Karenina (1919) and Manon, attracting audiences with her charm and youthful appeal. Mara and Zelnik became real celebrities, receiving at their home many known artists. Her popularity was further cemented by hundreds of her photographs issued as postcards, chocolate and cigarettes trade cards.

A serious car accident at the end of the 1920s interrupted her career.

Mara could not adapt her acting to the new artistic conditions after the introduction of sound in cinema in 1929, while Zelnik became the first director in Germany who postsynchronized foreign films. Lya Mara's only film from the sound era is Everyone Asks for Erika (1931) directed by her husband.

When Hitler took power in Germany (1933), Lya Mara left with Zelnik for London.

Frederic Zelnik died in London on 29 November 1950. Mara spent the last years of her life in Switzerland and died there on 1 March 1960.

== Filmography ==
- Chcemy męża (1916, as Mia Mara)
- Wściekły rywal (1916, as Mia Mara)
- Studenci (1916, as Mia Mara)
- Bestia (1917, as Mia Mara)
- Halkas Gelöbnis (1918)
- Jadwiga (1918)
- The Serenyi (1918)
- Geschichte einer Gefallenen, Die (1918)
- Das Geschlecht der Schelme 1. Teil (1918)
- The Nun and the Harlequin (1918)
- Die Rothenburger / Leib und Seele (1918)
- Das Geschlecht der Schelme 2. (1918)
- Charlotte Corday (1919)
- Maria Evere (1919)
- Die kleine Stasiewska (1919)
- The Heiress of the Count of Monte Cristo (1919)
- Das Haus der Unschuld (1919)
- Anna Karenina (1920)
- An der schönen blauen Donau (1920)
- Eine Demimonde-Heirat (1920)
- The Princess of the Nile (1920)
- Yoshiwara (1920)
- Fanny Elssler (1920)
- Kri-Kri, the Duchess of Tarabac (1920)
- The Apache Chief (1920)
- Fasching (1920)
- Wer unter Euch ohne Sünde ist... (1920)
- Count Varenne's Lover (1921)
- Miss Beryll (1921)
- Memoirs of a Film Actress (1921)
- Trix, the Romance of a Millionairess (1921)
- Die Dame mit den Smaragden (1921)
- The Girl from Piccadilly (1921, in two parts)
- The Marriage of Princess Demidoff (1922)
- The Mistress of the King (1922)
- Yvette, the Fashion Princess (1922)
- Tania, the Woman in Chains (1922)
- Napoleon's Daughter (1922)
- Insulted and Humiliated (1922)
- The Girl from Hell (1923)
- The Men of Sybill (1923)
- Lyda Ssanin (1923)
- Daisy (1923)
- Resurrection (1923)
- Nelly, the Bride Without a Husband (1924)
- The Mistress of Monbijou (1924)
- The Girl from Capri (1924)
- By Order of Pompadour (1924)
- Joyless Street (1925, uncredited), with Greta Garbo in the main part
- The Venus of Montmartre (1925)
- Die Kirschenzeit (1925)
- Women You Rarely Greet (1925)
- The Bohemian Dancer (1926)
- The Blue Danube (1926)
- Fadette (1926)
- The Gypsy Baron (1927)
- The Weavers (1927)
- Dancing Vienna (1927)
- Mariett Dances Today (1928)
- Mary Lou (1928)
- My Heart is a Jazz Band (1929)
- The Crimson Circle (1929)
- Everyone Asks for Erika (1931)
