= Wilhelm Diegelmann =

German actor (1861–1934)

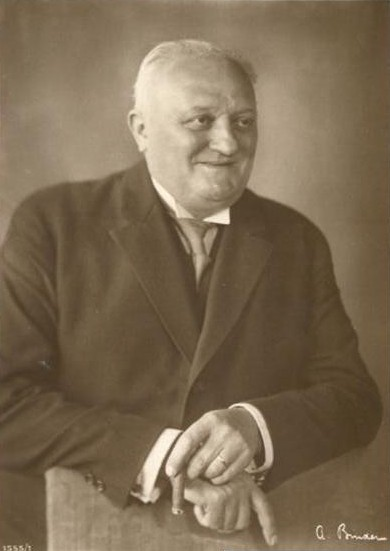
- Wilhelm Diegelmann in 1927
- Born: 28 September 1861; Ellers, Neuhof, Electorate of Hesse
- Died: 1 March 1934 (aged 72); Berlin, Nazi Germany
- Occupation: Actor
- Years active: 1915–1933

Wilhelm Diegelmann (28 September 1861 – 1 March 1934) was a German actor.

== Career ==
Diegelmann's first stage appearance was in 1878 in the chorus for the Frankfurt Opera. In 1881 he debuted at the Frankfurt City Theater, playing King Lear, William Tell, and other title characters. Sometime around 1900, Diegelmann relocated to Berlin. Here, he appeared at a variety of theaters, including the Deutsches Theater, the Großes Schauspielhaus, and the Deutsches Künstlertheater. Diegelmann was introduced to film in 1913 by Max Reinhardt. He became a prolific actor of supporting roles, often as a father figure. He performed in the well-known film Der Blaue Engel (The Blue Angel), where he played a ship captain who flirts with the lead actress (Marlene Dietrich). The final film he starred in was the Theodor Storm adaptation of Der Schimmelreiter (The Rider on the White Horse). He continued to make stage appearances after this, with his last role being in Rembrandt vor Gericht. He died not long after this. He was laid to rest at the Stahnsdorf South-Western Cemetery near Berlin, though the grave itself no longer exists.

== Selected filmography ==
- Robert and Bertram (1915)
- Laugh Bajazzo (1915)
- Benjamin the Timid (1916)
- Hans Trutz in the Land of Plenty (1917)
- Carmen (1918)
- Midnight (1918)
- The Pied Piper of Hamelin (1918)
- Alkohol (1919)
- The Woman at the Crossroads (1919)
- The Mistress of the World (1919)
- Prince Cuckoo (1919)
- Crown and Whip (1919)
- Veritas Vincit (1919)
- During My Apprenticeship (1919)
- The Derby (1919)
- The Mask (1919)
- The Bride of the Incapacitated (1919)
- Prostitution (1919)
- President Barrada (1920)
- The Forbidden Way (1920)
- Kri-Kri, the Duchess of Tarabac (1920)
- The Legend of Holy Simplicity (1920)
- The Tragedy of a Great (1920)
- Mary Magdalene (1920)
- Patience (1920)
- Monika Vogelsang (1920)
- The Skull of Pharaoh's Daughter (1920)
- Wibbel the Tailor (1920)
- The Wildcat (1921)
- Trix, the Romance of a Millionairess (1921)
- The Vulture Wally (1921)
- Memoirs of a Film Actress (1921)
- Off the Rails (1921)
- Parisian Women (1921)
- The Shadow of Gaby Leed (1921)
- The Poisoned Stream (1921)
- The Buried Self (1921)
- The Graveyard of the Living (1921)
- Hannerl and Her Lovers (1921)
- The Fear of Women (1921)
- Roswolsky's Mistress (1921)
- Hashish, the Paradise of Hell (1921)
- Lady Godiva (1921)
- The Black Panther (1921)
- The Conspiracy in Genoa (1921)
- Kean (1921)
- The Stranger from Alster Street (1921)
- Lola Montez, the King's Dancer (1922)
- The Big Shot (1922)
- The Fire Ship (1922)
- The Man of Steel (1922)
- Barmaid (1922)
- The Flight into Marriage (1922)
- Lumpaci the Vagabond (1922)
- The False Dimitri (1922)
- The Love Nest (1922)
- Bigamy (1922)
- Lucrezia Borgia (1922)
- The Treasure of Gesine Jacobsen (1923)
- The Stone Rider (1923)
- Friedrich Schiller (1923)
- The Second Shot (1923)
- Man by the Wayside (1923)
- The Woman on the Panther (1923)
- The Maharaja's Victory (1923)
- The Pilgrimage of Love (1923)
- The Burning Secret (1923)
- Martin Luther (1923)
- William Tell (1923)
- The Final Mask (1924)
- The Hobgoblin (1924)
- The Path to God (1924)
- Around a Million (1924)
- Dudu, a Human Destiny (1924)
- Man Against Man (1924)
- Mother and Child (1924)
- The Girl with a Patron (1925)
- The Director General (1925)
- The Dice Game of Life (1925)
- People in Need (1925)
- Letters Which Never Reached Him (1925)
- In the Valleys of the Southern Rhine (1925)
- The Old Ballroom (1925)
- Struggle for the Soil (1925)
- Ash Wednesday (1925)
- The Girl from America (1925)
- If You Have an Aunt (1925)
- Countess Maritza (1925)
- White Slave Traffic (1926)
- Vienna - Berlin (1926)
- I Liked Kissing Women (1926)
- The Mill at Sanssouci (1926)
- Sword and Shield (1926)
- Sons in Law (1926)
- Superfluous People (1926)
- Gretchen Schubert (1926)
- Fadette (1926)
- Vienna, How it Cries and Laughs (1926)
- Give My Regards to the Blonde Child on the Rhine (1926)
- The Fallen (1926)
- Hello Caesar! (1927)
- Regine (1927)
- A Serious Case (1927)
- Poor Little Colombine (1927)
- The Lorelei (1927)
- Aftermath (1927)
- When the Guard Marches (1928)
- The Market of Life (1928)
- Violantha (1928)
- Katharina Knie (1929)
- Youth of the Big City (1929)
- Hungarian Nights (1929)
- The Blue Angel (1930)
- The True Jacob (1931)
- Scandal on Park Street (1932)
- Secret Agent (1932)
- Hans Westmar (1933)
- The Rider on the White Horse (1934)

== Bibliography ==
- Kosta, Barbara. Willing Seduction: The Blue Angel, Marlene Dietrich, and Mass Culture. Berghahn Books, 2009.
