= Erich Kaiser-Titz =

German actor

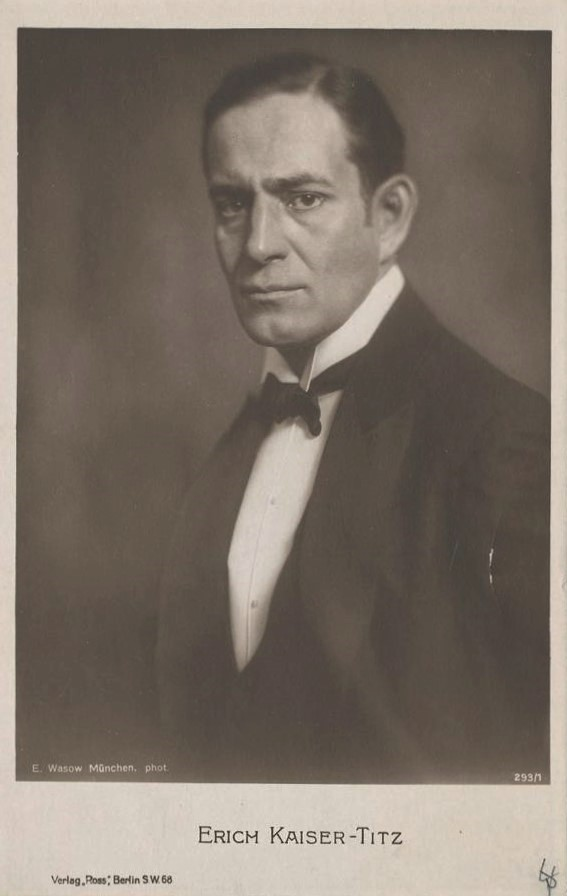
- Kaiser-Titz ca. 1923
- Born: Heinrich Felix Erich Kaiser-Titz; 7 October 1875; Berlin, German Empire
- Died: 22 November 1928 (aged 53); Berlin, Weimar Republic
- Occupation: Actor
- Years active: 1895–1928

Heinrich Felix Erich Kaiser-Titz (7 October 1875 – 22 November 1928) was a German stage and film actor.

== Selected filmography ==
- Tales of Hoffmann (1916)
- His Coquettish Wife (1916)
- The Knitting Needles (1916)
- The Night Talk (1917)
- The Lost Paradise (1917)
- Ferdinand Lassalle (1918)
- The Serenyi (1918)
- Waves of Fate (1918)
- Cain (1918)
- The Night of Decision (1920)
- Man Overboard (1921)
- The Devil's Chains (1921)
- Miss Beryll (1921)
- Peter Voss, Thief of Millions (1921)
- The Island of the Lost (1921)
- The Women of Gnadenstein (1921)
- The Riddle of the Sphinx (1921)
- The Golden Bullet (1921)
- Marie Antoinette, the Love of a King (1922)
- Insulted and Humiliated (1922)
- Black Monday (1922)
- Shadows of the Past (1922)
- Tania, the Woman in Chains (1922)
- The Favourite of the Queen (1922)
- Sins of Yesterday (1922)
- The Love Nest (1922)
- Yvette, the Fashion Princess (1922)
- The Mistress of the King (1922)
- The Great Industrialist (1923)
- William Tell (1923)
- The Maharaja's Victory (1923)
- The Sensational Trial (1923)
- Darling of the King (1924)
- Spring Awakening (1924)
- Fever for Heights (1924)
- Marionettes of the Princess (1924)
- Malva (1924)
- Nelly, the Bride Without a Husband (1924)
- The Doomed (1924)
- The Game of Love (1924)
- Maud Rockefeller's Bet (1924)
- Claire (1924)
- The Creature (1924)
- The Fire Dancer (1925)
- Wallenstein (1925)
- In the Name of the Kaisers (1925)
- In the Valleys of the Southern Rhine (1925)
- Bismarck (1925)
- The Man Who Sold Himself (1925)
- The Adventure of Mr. Philip Collins (1925)
- The Brothers Schellenberg (1926)
- Her Husband's Wife (1926)
- Fedora (1926)
- Hell of Love (1926)
- The Armoured Vault (1926)
- The Trumpets are Blowing (1926)
- Hunted People (1926)
- Vienna, How it Cries and Laughs (1926)
- The Fallen (1926)
- People to Each Other (1926)
- White Slave Traffic (1926)
- The Convicted (1927)
- A Murderous Girl (1927)
- A Girl of the People (1927)
- Weekend Magic (1927)
- The Owl (1927)
- Heaven on Earth (1927)
- The Trial of Donald Westhof (1927)
- The Woman from Till 12 (1928)
- Hungarian Rhapsody (1928)
- When the Mother and the Daughter (1928)
- The Carousel of Death (1928)
- The Lady in Black (1928)
- Panic (1928)

== Bibliography ==
- Hardt, Ursula (1996). From Caligari to California: Erich Pommer's Life in the International Film Wars. Providence: Berghahn Books. ISBN 978-1-57181-930-7.
