= Deulig Film =

German film company

Deulig Film or Deutsche Lichtbild-Gesellschaft was a German film production and distribution company. It was established in 1916 by the German business tycoon and media mogul Alfred Hugenberg. The company's foundation, during the First World War, was intended to promote Germany's military cause but it also supported the commercial interests of several major industrial companies who backed the enterprise.

The company developed a reputation for the production of short propaganda films and kulturfilms but also released feature films. In response to the company's success several rival industrial firms in alliance with the Deutsche Bank founded their own film company UFA in 1917, which in the decade that followed became Germany largest film enterprise.

In 1927 when Hugenberg launched a successful takeover bid for UFA, the two companies merged. Duelig continued to release newsreels but was otherwise swallowed into the larger UFA conglomerate.

== Bibliography ==
- Petley, Julian. Capital and Culture: German Cinema, 1933–45. British Film Institute, 1979.
