= Fritz Schulz (actor) =

Austrian actor and director (1896-1972)

Fritz Schulz (25 April 1896 – 9 May 1972) was a German and Austrian movie and stage actor, singer and director.

Born in Karlovy Vary (Karlsbad), Austria-Hungary, he appeared in almost one hundred movies between 1917 and 1970. Of Jewish extraction, Schultz fled the German film industry in Berlin at the onset of Nazism in 1933 and moved to Vienna to act in and direct independent Austrian film productions. He departed Austria as an exile upon the German Anschluss in 1938 and settled in Switzerland, where he concentrated on his stage career until his death in Zürich in 1972.

He was married at the age of 14 to 19 year old actress Ágnes Esterházy from 1910 until her death in 1956.

== Selected filmography ==
Actor

- When Four Do the Same (1917)
- The Onyx Head (1917)
- Different from the Others (1919)
- The Mask (1919)
- The Secret of the American Docks (1919)
- The Marquise of Armiani (1920)
- Whitechapel (1920)
- The Yellow Diplomat (1920)
- Kri-Kri, the Duchess of Tarabac (1920)
- Jim Cowrey is Dead (1921)
- Trix, the Romance of a Millionairess (1921)
- The Hunt for the Truth (1921)
- Murder Without Cause (1921)
- The Bull of Olivera (1921)
- Hazard (1921)
- Miss Beryll (1921)
- Lola Montez, the King's Dancer (1922)
- The Marriage of Princess Demidoff (1922)
- The Flight into Marriage (1922)
- The Man of Steel (1922)
- Yvette, the Fashion Princess (1922)
- Youth (1922)
- The Big Shot (1922)
- Heart of Stone (1924)
- Playing with Destiny (1924)
- The Woman with That Certain Something (1925)
- Tales from the Vienna Woods (1928)
- The Gypsy Chief (1929)
- Dear Homeland (1929)
- Rooms to Let (1930)
- You'll Be in My Heart (1930)
- Pension Schöller (1930)
- Three Days Confined to Barracks (1930)
- Rendezvous (1930)
- The Soaring Maiden (1931)
- Headfirst into Happiness (1931)
- Duty Is Duty (1931)
- The Battle of Bademunde (1931)
- Hooray, It's A Boy! (1931)
- The Spanish Fly (1931)
- The Beggar Student (1931)
- My Cousin from Warsaw (1931)
- The Unfaithful Eckehart (1931)
- The Song of Night (1932)
- Waltz Time (1933)
- Tell Me Who You Are (1933)
- The Constant Nymph (1933)
- Leap into Bliss (1934)
- Cabaret (1954)
- Die unvollkommene Ehe (1959)
- Sacred Waters (1960)

Director

- Leap into Bliss (1934)
- Ende schlecht, alles gut (1934)
- Last Love (1935)
- Shipwrecked Max (co-director: Sigurd Wallén, 1936)
  - Rendezvous in Paradise (co-director: Sigurd Wallén, 1936)
- Gruß und Kuß aus der Wachau (1950)

== Bibliography ==
- Fritsche, Maria (2013). Homemade Men in Postwar Austrian Cinema: Nationhood, Genre and Masculinity. New York: Berghahn Books. ISBN 978-0-85745-946-6.
- Von Dassanowsky, Robert (2005). Austrian Cinema: A History. Jefferson, NC: McFarland. ISBN 978-1-4766-2147-0.
