= Fanny Carlsen =

German screenwriter

- Occupation: Writer
- Years active: 1918–1932 (film )

Fanny Carlsen was a German screenwriter of the silent era. As she was Jewish she was likely forced to emigrate with the Nazi Party's coming to power in 1933, although her exact fate is unknown.

== Selected filmography ==
- The Yellow Diplomat (1920)
- The Law of the Desert (1920)
- Kri-Kri, the Duchess of Tarabac (1920)
- Fanny Elssler (1920)
- Count Varenne's Lover (1921)
- The Convict of Cayenne (1921)
- Miss Beryll (1921)
- Memoirs of a Film Actress (1921)
- Trix, the Romance of a Millionairess (1921)
- The Buried Self (1921)
- The Mistress of the King (1922)
- Insulted and Humiliated (1922)
- The Marriage of Princess Demidoff (1922)
- Tania, the Woman in Chains (1922)
- Lyda Ssanin (1923)
- The Men of Sybill (1923)
- Resurrection (1923)
- Irene of Gold (1923)
- The Girl from Hell (1923)
- Daisy (1923)
- The Other Woman (1924)
- The Mistress of Monbijou (1924)
- The Sailor Perugino (1924)
- Nelly, the Bride Without a Husband (1924)
- The Dealer from Amsterdam (1925)
- Athletes (1925)
- Old Mamsell's Secret (1925)
- The Bohemian Dancer (1926)
- The Blue Danube (1926)
- Fadette (1926)
- The Violet Eater (1926)
- The House of Lies (1926)
- The Weavers (1927)
- Dancing Vienna (1927)
- The Gypsy Baron (1927)
- Mary Lou (1928)
- The Beaver Coat (1928)
- Mariett Dances Today (1928)
- The Crimson Circle (1929)
- The Dancer of Sanssouci (1932)

== Bibliography ==
- Jill Nelmes & Jule Selbo. Women Screenwriters: An International Guide. Palgrave Macmillan, 2015.
