= Frederic Zelnik =

Austrian film producer (1885–1950)

Friedrich Zelnik
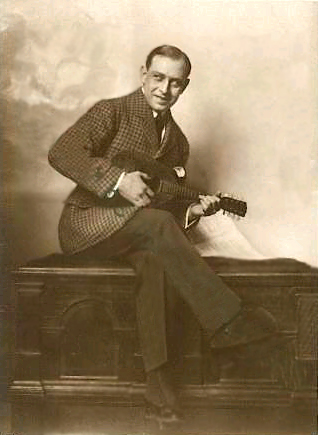
- Zelnik prior to 1931
- Born: 17 May 1885; Czernowitz, Duchy of Bukovina, Austria-Hungary
- Died: 29 November 1950 (aged 65); London, England
- Occupations: Director; Producer; Actor
- Years active: 1914–1939
- Spouse: Lya Mara (m. 1918)

Frederic Zelnik (born Friedrich Zelnik; 17 May 1885 – 29 November 1950) was an Austrian producer, director, and actor.He was one of the most important producers-directors of the German silent cinema. Zelnik achieved success through period operetta films in the 1920s and 1930s.

== Biography ==
Friedrich Zelnik was born into a Jewish family in Czernowitz, today in Ukraine, at the time the capital of the Duchy of Bukovina in the Austrian part of the Austro-Hungarian Monarchy. After studying in Vienna, Friedrich Zelnik worked as an actor in theaters in Nürnberg, Aachen, Worms, Prague and finally Berlin, in the theaters Theater an der Königsgrätzer Straße, Berliner Theater, and Komödienhaus.

In 1914 Friedrich Zelnik began acting in films, and after 1915 producing and directing movies while still appearing in roles as an actor in other director'films. In 1918 he married a young Polish ballet dancer turned film actress named Lya Mara and promoted her to stardom by producing and directing movies for her. In 1920 he established a film production firm Zelnik-Mara-Film GmbH.

Popular, operetta style costume films like The Blue Danube, The Bohemian Dancer, Dancing Vienna, Mariett Dances Today brought Lya Mara and Zelnik enormous success in Germany and beyond. Several of his collaborators, such as cameraman Frederik Fuglsang and production designer André Andrejew are perceived today as important artists of the German silent cinema.

Upon the introduction of sound film, Friedrich Zelnik became the first director in Europe to postsynchronize a movie, The Crimson Circle (1929), using the DeForest Phonofilm sound-on-film process. In 1930, Zelnik traveled to Hollywood, California and upon his return to Germany, directed his first full sound film, a new version of his silent success The Bohemian Dancer.

After Hitler took power in 1933, Zelnik and Lya Mara left Germany for London. In the following years, Zelnik continued to direct and produce movies in Great Britain and the Netherlands. He also legally changed his name to Fred Zelnik and took British citizenship.

Zelnik died in 1950 in London, aged 65.

== Selected filmography ==
=== Director ===
- His Majesty the Hypochondriac (1918)
- Charlotte Corday (1919)
- The Heiress of the Count of Monte Cristo (1919)
- Anna Karenina (1920)
- Kri-Kri, the Duchess of Tarabac (1920)
- Fanny Elssler (1920)
- Count Varenne's Lover (1921)
- The Girl from Piccadilly (1921)
- Trix, the Romance of a Millionairess (1921)
- Miss Beryll (1921)
- Memoirs of a Film Actress (1921)
- Count Festenberg (1922)
- Napoleon's Daughter (1922)
- The Mistress of the King (1922)
- Insulted and Humiliated (1922)
- Yvette, the Fashion Princess (1922)
- The Marriage of Princess Demidoff (1922)
- Tania, the Woman in Chains (1922)
- Lyda Ssanin (1923)
- Resurrection (1923)
- The Men of Sybill (1923)
- Irene of Gold (1923)
- The Girl from Hell (1923)
- Daisy (1923)
- The Girl from Capri (1924)
- The Sailor Perugino (1924)
- Marionettes of the Princess (1924)
- The Mistress of Monbijou (1924)
- Nelly, the Bride Without a Husband (1924)
- By Order of Pompadour (1924)
- Athletes (1925)
- Letters Which Never Reached Him (1925)
- Women You Rarely Greet (1925)
- The Venus of Montmartre (1925)
- The Bohemian Dancer (1926)
- The Mill at Sanssouci (1926)
- The Violet Eater (1926)
- The Blue Danube (1926)
- Fadette (1926)
- The Weavers (1927)
- Dancing Vienna (1927)
- The Gypsy Baron (1927)
- Mariett Dances Today (1928)
- Mary Lou (1928)
- My Heart is a Jazz Band (1929)
- The Crimson Circle (1929)
- The Forester's Daughter (1931)
- Everyone Asks for Erika (1932)
- The Dancer of Sanssouci (1932)
- Spies at the Savoy Hotel (1932)
- Happy (1933)
- The Emperor's Waltz (1933)
- Southern Roses (1936)
- The Lilac Domino (1937)
- Daddy Long Legs (1938)
- Tomorrow It Will Be Better (1939)
- I Killed the Count (1939)

=== Producer ===
- The Lost Paradise (1917)
- The Serenyi (1918)
- The Peruvian (1919)
- The Yellow Diplomat (1920)
- The Princess of the Nile (1920)
- The Law of the Desert (1920)
- The Convict of Cayenne (1921)
- The Buried Self (1921)
- The Bank Crash of Unter den Linden (1926)
