= Marmorhaus =

Historic cinema in Berlin

Coordinates: 52°31′12″N 13°24′18″E

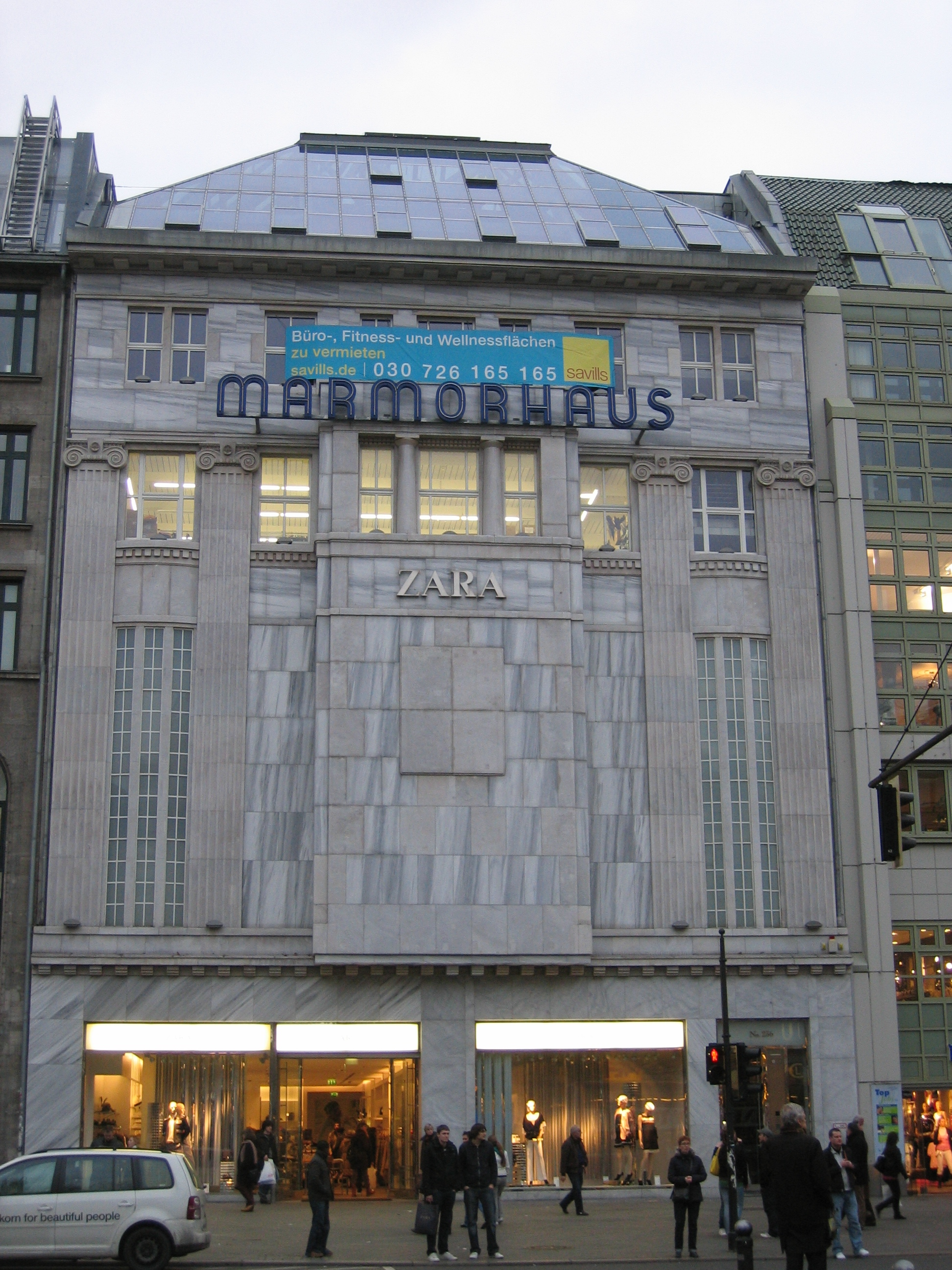
Marmorhaus in 2008, when it was a Zara store.

The Marmorhaus (English: Marble House) was a cinema that used to be located on the Kurfürstendamm in Berlin. Opened in 1913, it takes its name from a large marble façade. Designed by the architect Hugo Pál, the walls of the foyer and auditorium were decorated by the expressionist artist Cesar Klein.

During the silent era it was a common venue for premieres of new films. These included The Cabinet of Dr. Caligari, Johannes Goth, The Woman in Heaven, The Head of Janus, Genuine, Four Around a Woman, Wandering Souls, and The Haunted Castle.

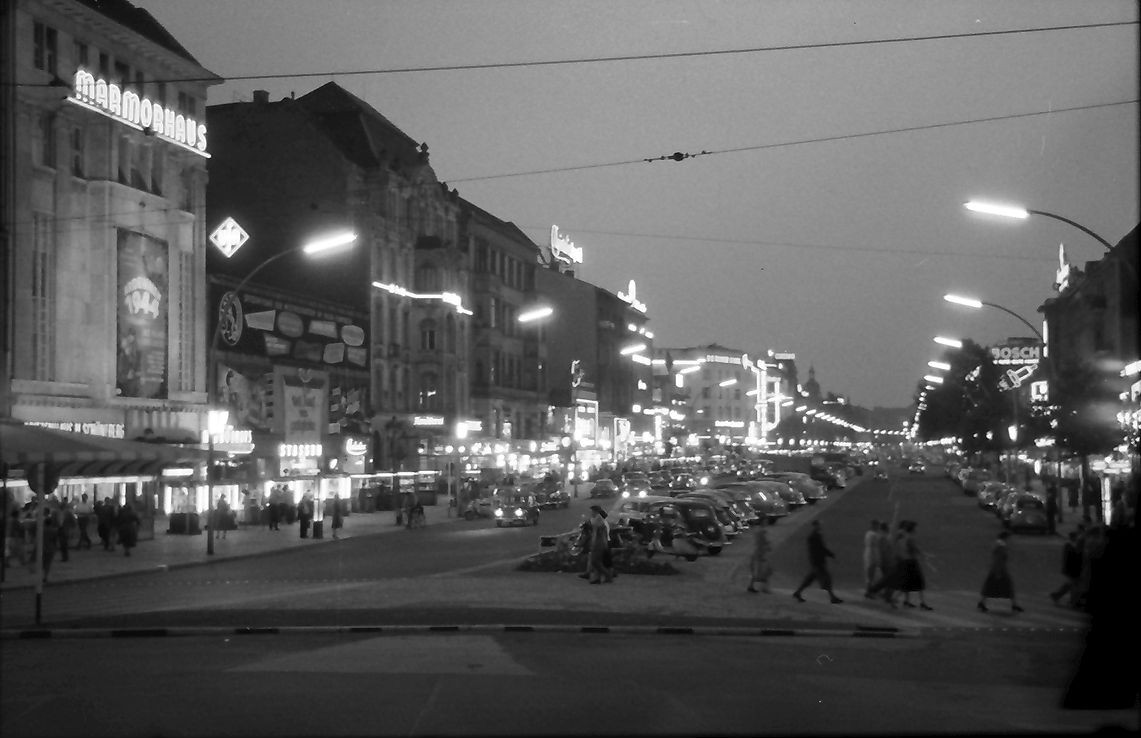
A view of the cinema in 1957.

Owned by the giant UFA company for many years, it was later developed into a multiplex.

In 2001 the cinema closed, and the property was sold to the Spanish retailer Zara, which remodeled it as a store. It has since been converted to a MUJI store.

== Bibliography ==
- Hardt, Ursula. From Caligari to California: Erich Pommer's life in the International Film Wars. Berghahn Books, 1996.
- Kreimeier, Klaus. The Ufa Story: A History of Germany's Greatest Film Company, 1918-1945. University of California Press, 1999.
