= Vineta =

Mythical city in the Baltic Sea

Vineta (sometimes Wineta) is the name of a legendary city at the southern coast of the Baltic Sea. The legend evolved around traditions about the Medieval emporium called Jumne, Jomsborg, Julin or similar names by the chronicles, and with which Vineta is sometimes identified.

== Legend ==
There are several Vineta legends. All of them portray the Vinetans as having an excessive, voluptuous or blasphemous way of life and then being punished in a flood that took the city to the bottom of the Baltic. In some variants of the myth, the city or parts thereof reappear on certain days or can be seen from a boat, making the warning conveyed by the myth more tangible for the audience.

== Primary sources ==
- About 965, Ibrahim ibn Jaqub wrote in Arabic letters about this city. The transcription might be Weltaba, which corresponds to modern Polish "Wełtawa" meaning roughly a place among waves.
- 1075/80, Adam of Bremen wrote about an emporium on an island in the Oder estuary, east of his Diocese, where Slavs, Barbarians and Greeks were supposed to live and Saxon merchants stayed for trade. Harald Bluetooth had once found refuge there. The oldest preserved manuscript, from the 11th century, has the spelling vimne or uimne, and the second oldest manuscript, from around 1200, has uimne and iumne or jumne (there is no distinction between v and u or i and j in the written Latin of that time). More recent copies of the text primarily use Jumne; in an early modern print the name is spelled Julinum and Juminem.
- Between 1140 and 1159, three vitae of Otto of Bamberg were written using the name Julin for the medieval place located at the site of the later town of Wolin.
- 1163/1168, Helmold of Bosau copied almost word for word the respective sentences written by Adam of Bremen. The oldest preserved handwriting of Helmolds chronicle (ca. 1300) has the place spelled uineta, corrected by the copyist to iuḿta (abbreviation of iumenta or iumneta). Younger copies use Jumneta in the text, yet in the header of the respective chapter all copies use Vinneta.
- About 1170, the Nordic Knytlinga saga reported a siege of Jomsborg by the Dano-Norwegian king Magnus (1043) and a campaign against that place by the Danish king Valdemar I (1170).
- About 1190, Saxo Grammaticus reported the same campaign (1170) and Harald Bluetooth's earlier stay there, but called the place Julin[um].

== Geographical place ==
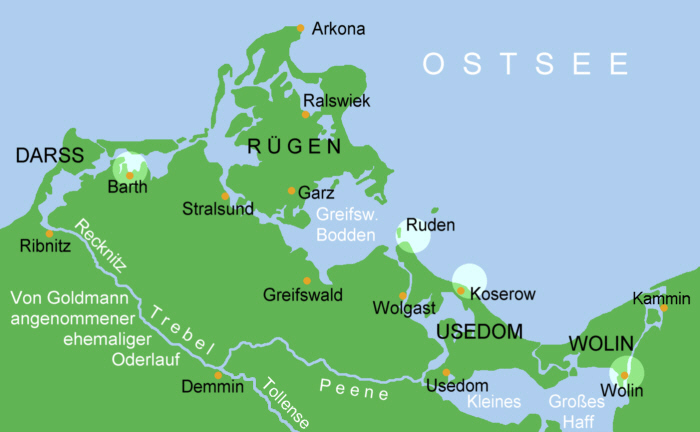
Postulated locations of Vineta

=== Vineta Reef off Koserow / Damerow ===
Some variants of the myth have Vineta sunken off Koserow (on the isle of Usedom). The historian Wilhelm Ferdinand Gadebusch from Swinemünde (Świnoujście) made this and other observations the basis for his thesis of Vineta's location. According to Gadebusch, Wolin did not have the deep water port that Vineta must have had, and thus discarded the Wolin thesis (see below). David Chyträus in his 16th century Chronicon Saxoniae had Vineta "beyond the Peene river near the village of Damerow" which was a Vorwerk of Koserow. For Chyträus, Usedom was the land of the Vinetans, while Julin on the neighboring island of Wolin was inhabited by Pomoranians. Since no traces of Slavic settlement have been found on northwest Usedom, this thesis is no longer accepted.

=== Ruden ===
Several maps published between 1633 and 1700 have the sunken "Wineta" east of the island of Ruden northwest of Usedom. About 1700, Bernhard Walther Marperger reported it in the same spot. The origin of this thesis is the All Saints flood of 1306 that reduced Ruden and other small islands from a much larger landmass that prior to the flood had existed between Mönchgut and Usedom.

=== Wolin ===
Rudolf Virchow said: "Vineta is Wollin!" Based on the primary sources outlined above, Adolf Hofmeister in 1931/32 formulated the thesis that Vineta, Jumne, Julin, Jomsborg etc. are all different spellings used for the same place on the site of today's town of Wolin. Beginning in the 1930s, and continued after the annexation of Wolin to Poland after World War II, archaeologists unearthed the remains of a large settlement there. Hofmeister's thesis is the only mainstream thesis regarding the location of Vineta in today's historiography.

=== Barth ===
A thesis formulated by Goldmann und Wermusch placed Vineta near Barth, pointing to a possibly different course of the Oder in the Middle Ages and a creative reading of the primary sources outlined above.

== In popular culture ==
=== Poems and music ===
- Vineta. poem by Wilhelm Müller (1794–1827), in Muscheln von der Insel Rügen (1825)
  - Intonation by Johannes Brahms for Chor a cappella in six voices, op. 42 Nr. 2 (1860)
  - Intonation by Achim Reichel, for the album Wilder Wassermann (2002)
- Seegespenst. Poem by Heinrich Heine (1797–1856), in Die Nordsee. 1. Abteilung (1826)
- Two texts by Ferdinand Freiligrath (1810–1876): Poem Meerfahrt (1838); Wilhelm Müller. Eine Geisterstimme (1872)
- Vineta-Glocken. Valse boston (1920er Jahre) by John Lindsay-Theimer (Pseudonym of the Carynthian Johann Theimer)
- Vineta (1994). Concert piece and suite for Zither solo by Peter Kiesewetter
- Vineta (2001). Sinfonical poem by Urs Joseph Flury
- Vineta. Song of the band Puhdys (Puhdys 1, 4. Titel)
- Vineta. Song by Michael Heck
- Vineta. Song from the De Plattfööt album Ierst mol ganz langsam
- Vineta. Planned 3. volume of the long poem Nautilus by Uwe Tellkamp
- Vineta. poetry collection by Uwe Kolbe, 1998
- „Vineta“, Song by Josef Seiler (text) and Ignaz Heim (music)
- "Vineta", Choral piece by Ēriks Ešenvalds (2009).
- „Vineta“ (2011). Song of the band Transit (Band) (album „Übers Meer“, title 6)
- Rolf Kahl: Rauher Wind am Birkhuhnsee, contains a travel to Jumne
- Ilse Helbich: Vineta, Literaturverlag Droschl 2013, ISBN 9783854208457

=== Audio Drama ===
- The Lakes of the Moon Volume 1.5 - VHS (2024) by Vincent Alastair

=== Plays, festivals and opera ===
- Vineta (1863). Opera by Jan Nepomuk Škroup. First 1870 in Prague (Vineta; Czech)
- Vineta. Schauspiel. In: Zu spät. Vier Einakter (1902) by Marie Eugenie delle Grazie.
- The Baltic Legend; about the demise of the mythic city of Vineta, opera in three acts (1924) by Feliks Nowowiejski.
- Vineta. Die versunkene Stadt (1937). Play by Jura Soyfer
- Vineta (1960–67). Opera by Rudolf Mors (text und music). First 1968 in Bielefeld
- Vineta-Festspiele (since 1997). Open air theater festival of the Vorpommersche Landesbühne Anklam in Ostseebühne Zinnowitz
- Republik Vineta (2000). Play by Moritz Rinke
- Vineta (Oderwassersucht). Play by Armin Petras (under the pseudonym Fritz Kater). First 2001 in Leipzig

=== In prose literature ===
- Elisabeth Bürstenbinder (pen name E. Werner): Vineta. Novel (1877)
- Theodor Fontane: Effi Briest. Novel (1895; c. 17: alluding Heinrich Heine's Seegespenst)
- Selma Lagerlöf: The Wonderful Adventures of Nils. Novel (1906/07; contains a retelling of the myth)
- Oskar Loerke: Vineta. Essay(1907)
- Hans Albrecht Moser: Vineta. Ein Gegenwartsroman aus künftiger Sicht (1955)
- Zofia Kossak-Szczucka, Zygmunt Szatkowski: Troja północy (Troy of North), Pax (1960)
- Günter Grass: Der Butt. Novel (1977); Die Rättin. Novel (1986)
- Lawrence Norfolk: The Pope's Rhinoceros. Novel (1996)
- Heinz-Jürgen Zierke: Das Mädchen aus Vineta. Essay (2000; tells the story of an unsuccessful attempt to deliver Vineta from its curse.)
- Uwe Tellkamp: Der Schlaf in den Uhren. Essay (2004; draws parallels between Dresden and Vineta)
- Charlotte Lyne: Die Glocken von Vineta. Novel (2007)
- Toni Glenn: Mappa Ordica, Adventure/Novel (2008)
- Oleg Alexandrowitsch Jurjew / (Oleg Yuriev): Винета. Novel (2007, Russian) / Die russische Fracht. Novel (2009, German translation)
- Benno Beginn: Vinetas Träume fliegen, Historical fantasy novel, Otto-Johann-Verlag, Lubmin 2009
- Rolf Kahl: Rauher Wind am Birkhuhnsee, contains a travel to Jumne
- Ilse Helbich: Vineta, Literaturverlag Droschl 2013, ISBN 9783854208457

=== Movies ===
- Vineta, the Sunken City (1923) by Werner Funck
- The Wonderful Adventures of Nils. anime (1980): Episode 15 – Die versunkene Stadt
- Vineta (2006) by Franziska Stünkel, with Peter Lohmeyer

=== TV-series ===
- Küstenwache (ZDF), 21. Dezember 2011: „Der Fluch von Vineta“.

=== Board games ===
- Vineta

=== Video games ===
- The name of an ocean planet in Signalis.
- The name of a track in Wipeout Pure.

=== Place names ===
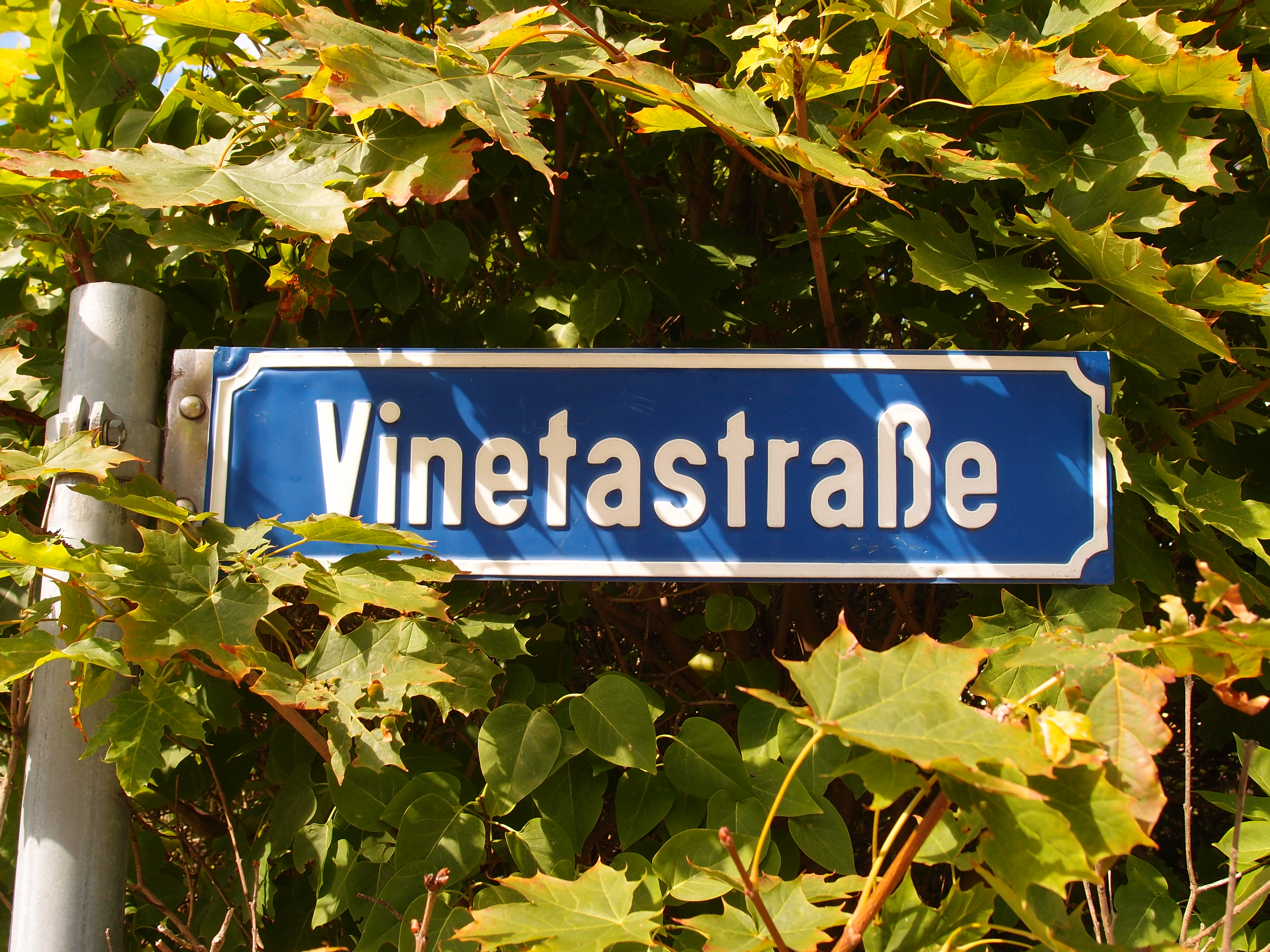
Vinetastraße in Ahlbeck (Usedom)

- In Berlin there is a Vineta Street (Vinetastraße) and a U-Bahn station.
- In Berlin there is also a Vineta square (Vinetaplatz) in Wedding, next to Swinemünder Straße and Wolliner Straße.
- The German Empire's navy had the vessels Vineta (Vineta of 1863, Vineta of 1897, Vineta of 1915, and SMS Möwe, briefly renamed Vineta in 1915)
- In 1903 a square in the center of Gaarden-Ost, Kiel was named Vinetaplatz after SMS Vineta I.
- The (West) German navy from 1961 to 1992 had a mine sweeper „Vineta“ (M2652, Ariadne-class) in 3. Minensuchgeschwader.
- An artwork installation in Störmthaler See near Leipzig is called „Vineta.“
- A rare German Empire stamp is called "Vineta provisional".
- In Swakopmund, Namibia, there is a neighborhood Vineta.
- In Heidelberg there is a student fraternity "Vineta" since 1879.
- In Schleswig-Holstein there is a sports club named TSV Vineta Audorf.
- In Schleswig Holstein (Busdorf) there is a club called Disco-Vineta.
- In Europa-Park Rust (Baden), in the themed land 'Scandinavia' there was an attraction 'Sunken city "Vineta"'. It was destroyed in a fire in 2018 and may never be rebuilt.

== See also ==
- Kitezh
- Ys
- Vinetabank

== Bibliography ==
- Adolf Hofmeister: "Vineta," die quellenkritische Lösung eines vielberufenen Problems, in Forschungen und Fortschritte, vol. 8 (1932), pp. 341–343.
- Carl Friedrich von Rumohr: Über das Verhältnis der seit lange gewöhnlichen Vorstellungen of einer prachtvollen Wineta zu unsrer positiven Kenntniß der Kultur und Kunst der deutschen Ostseeslaven. In: Sammlung für Kunst und Historie. Perthes & Besser, Hamburg, Erster Band Erstes Heft. 1816. Digitalisat der Sächsischen Landesbibliothek- Staats- und Universitätsbibliothek
- Erich Rackwitz: Geheimnis um Vineta. Legende und Wirklichkeit einer versunkenen Stadt. Der Kinderbuchverlag Berlin, 4. Auflage 1969.
- Ingrid Lange, P. Werner Lange: Vineta, Atlantis des Nordens. Urania-Verlag, Leipzig 1988, ISBN 3-332-00197-3
- Klaus Goldmann, Günter Wermusch: Vineta. Die Wiederentdeckung einer versunkenen Stadt. Bergisch Gladbach 1999.
- Franz Wegener: Neu-Vineta. Die Rassesiedlungspläne der Ariosophen für die Halbinseln Darß und Zingst. KFVR 2010, ISBN 978-3-931300-26-5
- Günter Wermusch, Das Vineta Rätsel. Boddin 2011. ISBN 978-3-933274-80-9.
- Albert Burkhardt von Hinstorff, Vineta. Sagen und Märchen vom Ostseestrand

=== Further reading ===
- The Baltic Sea : New Developments in National Politics and International Cooperation, 1997, edited by Renate Platzöder, Philomène A. Verlaan, 1997, ISBN 978-90-411-0357-4. See: Part I, Chapter 1 by John P. Craven, "Legend, History and Modern Times".
