= The Fate of Maria Keith =

- Directed by: Rudolf Walther-Fein
- Produced by: Rudolf Dworsky
- Starring: Maria Zelenka
- Production company: Amboß-Film
- Release date: 1919
- Country: Germany
- Languages: Silent; German intertitles

The Fate of Maria Keith (German:Das Schicksal der Maria Keith) is a 1919 German silent film directed by Rudolf Walther-Fein and starring Hans Werder, Maria Zelenka and Hans Wallner.

== Cast ==
- Hans Werder as Sebaldus Keith auf Kellinghausen
- Maria Zelenka as Maria, seine Tochter
- Hans Wallner as Professor Seidelbast, Marias Lehrer
- Gustav Jahrbeck as Theodor Bollingbrock - Keiths Neffe
- Clara Heinrich as Anette von Gellwitz
- Ernst Pittschau as Bernhard von Gellwitz, ihr Sohn
