= Battle of the Butterflies =

1924 film

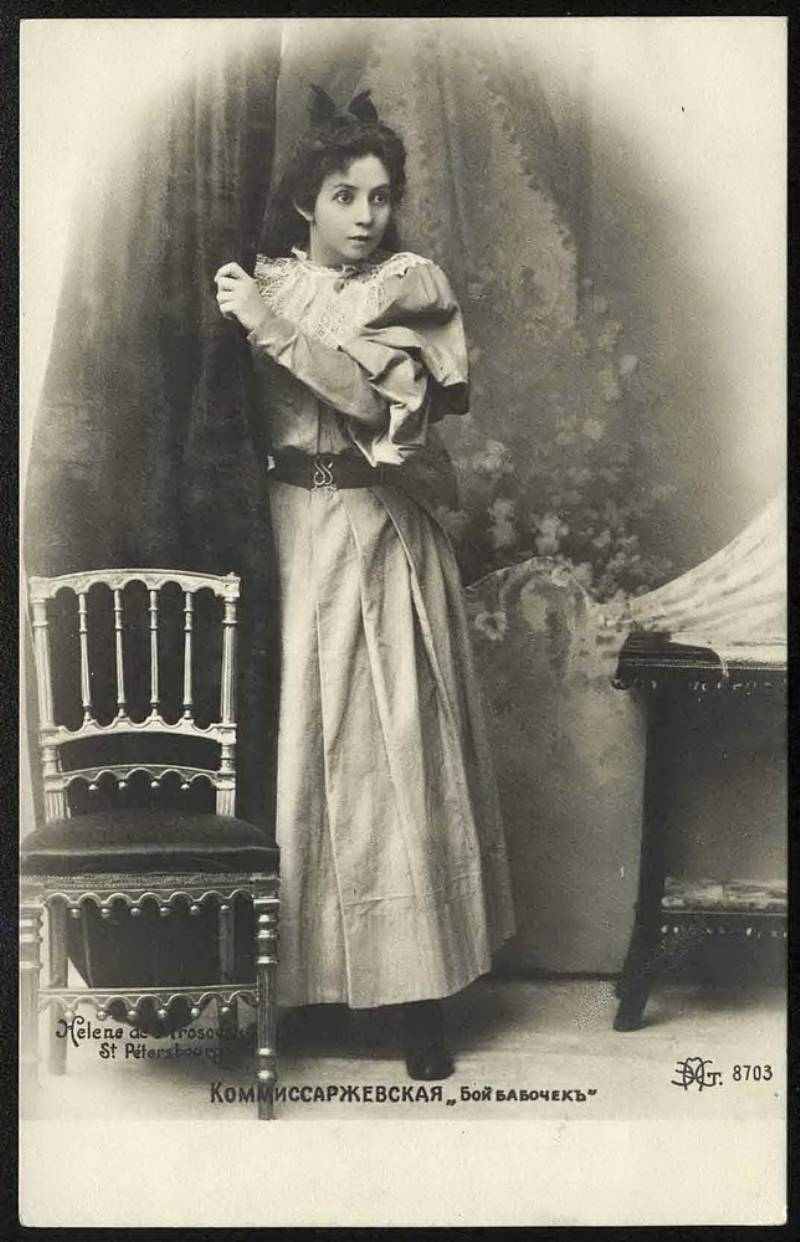
- Directed by: Franz Eckstein
- Written by: Rosa Porten; Willy Rath; Hermann Sudermann (play)
- Starring: Asta Nielsen; Reinhold Schünzel; Hans Brausewetter
- Cinematography: Franz Stein
- Production company: National Film
- Distributed by: National Film
- Release date: 14 November 1924
- Running time: 105 minutes
- Country: Germany
- Languages: Silent; German intertitles

Battle of the Butterflies (German: Die Schmetterlingsschlacht) is a 1924 German silent drama film directed by Franz Eckstein and starring Asta Nielsen, Reinhold Schünzel and Hans Brausewetter. It is based on a play by Hermann Sudermann. It was shot at the National Studios in Berlin.

== Cast ==
- Asta Nielsen as Rosi Hergentheim
- Reinhold Schünzel as Richard Keßler, Reisender
- Hans Brausewetter as Wilhelm Vogel, Apothekerlehrling
- Adele Sandrock as Verwitw. Regierungsrätin Hergentheim
- Lori Leux as Else, älteste Tochter von Frau Hergentheim
- Paul Bildt as C. Winkelmann
- Gregori Chmara as Max Winkelmann
- Werner Funck
- Karl Elzer
- Mary Parker as Laura Hergentheim

== Bibliography ==
- Grange, William (2008). Cultural Chronicle of the Weimar Republic. Lanham, MD: Scarecrow Press. ISBN 978-0-8108-5967-8.
