= SMS Vineta =

Two ships of the Imperial German Navy, and one of the Prussian Navy, have borne the name SMS Vineta, named after the mythic city of Vineta :

- SMS Vineta (1863) was a steam frigate built in 1863 (de:SMS Vineta (1863)).
- SMS Vineta (1897) was a protected cruiser launched in 1897.
- SMS Vineta (1915) was an auxiliary cruiser outfitted for commerce raiding in the First World War
