= Baltic flood =

Baltic flood may refer to:

- The Zanclean flood that ended the Messinian salinity crisis 5.33 million years ago
- The All Saints' Flood of 1304
- The 1872 Baltic Sea flood
- Other storm floods in the Baltic Sea
