= Lotte Lore =

1921 film

- Margarete Schlegel and Erna Morena
- Directed by: Franz Eckstein
- Written by: W. Heimburg; Rosa Porten
- Starring: Erna Morena; Alfred Abel; Margarete Schlegel
- Cinematography: Franz Stein
- Production company: National Film
- Distributed by: National Film
- Release date: 1921
- Country: Germany
- Languages: Silent; German intertitles

Lotte Lore is a 1921 German historical film directed by Franz Eckstein and starring Erna Morena, Alfred Abel, and Margarete Schlegel.

== Cast ==
In alphabetical order

- Alfred Abel
- Fritz Delius
- Oswald Delmor as Kammerdiener
- Werner Funck
- Ilka Grüning
- Erna Morena
- Sophie Pagay as Die Wiesenthalerin
- Hermann Picha as Exzellenz Graf Buchlohe
- Margarete Schlegel
- Hans Tillo as Kammerjunker von Krosseck
- Emmy Wyda as Exzellenz von Tilleberg

== Bibliography ==
- Bock, Hans-Michael; Bergfelder, Tim, eds. (2009). The Concise Cinegraph: Encyclopaedia of German Cinema. New York: Berghahn Books. ISBN 978-1-57181-655-9.
