= Lena Warnstetten =

1925 film by Erich Eriksen

- Directed by: Erich Eriksen
- Written by: Hedwig Courths-Mahler (novel); Alfred Mayer-Eckhardt
- Starring: Grete Reinwald; William Dieterle
- Cinematography: Franz Stein
- Production company: National Film
- Distributed by: National Film
- Release date: 1925
- Country: Germany
- Languages: Silent; German intertitles

Lena Warnstetten is a 1925 German silent film directed by Erich Eriksen and starring Grete Reinwald and William Dieterle.

== Cast ==
In alphabetical order

- Carl Auen as Herr von Romitten
- William Dieterle as Freiherr von Borkenhagen
- Karl Elzer as Prinz Ludwig
- Fritz Kuhlbrodt as Joseph
- Philipp Manning as Baron von Warnstetten
- Ernst Pittschau
- Grete Reinwald as Lena
- Frida Richard
- Sonja Wernsdorf as Warnstetten Frau

== Bibliography ==
- Hans-Michael Bock and Tim Bergfelder. The Concise Cinegraph: An Encyclopedia of German Cinema. Berghahn Books.
