= The Girl Without a Conscience =

1922 film directed by William Kahn

- Directed by: William Kahn
- Written by: William Kahn; Hans Joachim Freiherr von Reizenstein
- Cinematography: Otto Jäger
- Production company: William Kahn-Film
- Distributed by: UFA
- Release date: 1922
- Country: Germany
- Languages: Silent; German intertitles

The Girl Without a Conscience (German: Das Mädchen ohne Gewissen) is a 1922 German silent film directed by William Kahn and starring Maria Zelenka.

The film's art direction was by August Rinaldi.

== Cast ==
In alphabetical order:

- Julius Falkenstein
- Ernst Hofmann
- Viggo Larsen
- Sophie Pagay
- Maria Zelenka

== Bibliography ==
- Grange, William. Cultural Chronicle of the Weimar Republic. Scarecrow Press, 2008.
