= Battle of Bysjön =

1644 battle of the Torstenson War

- Part of the Torstenson War
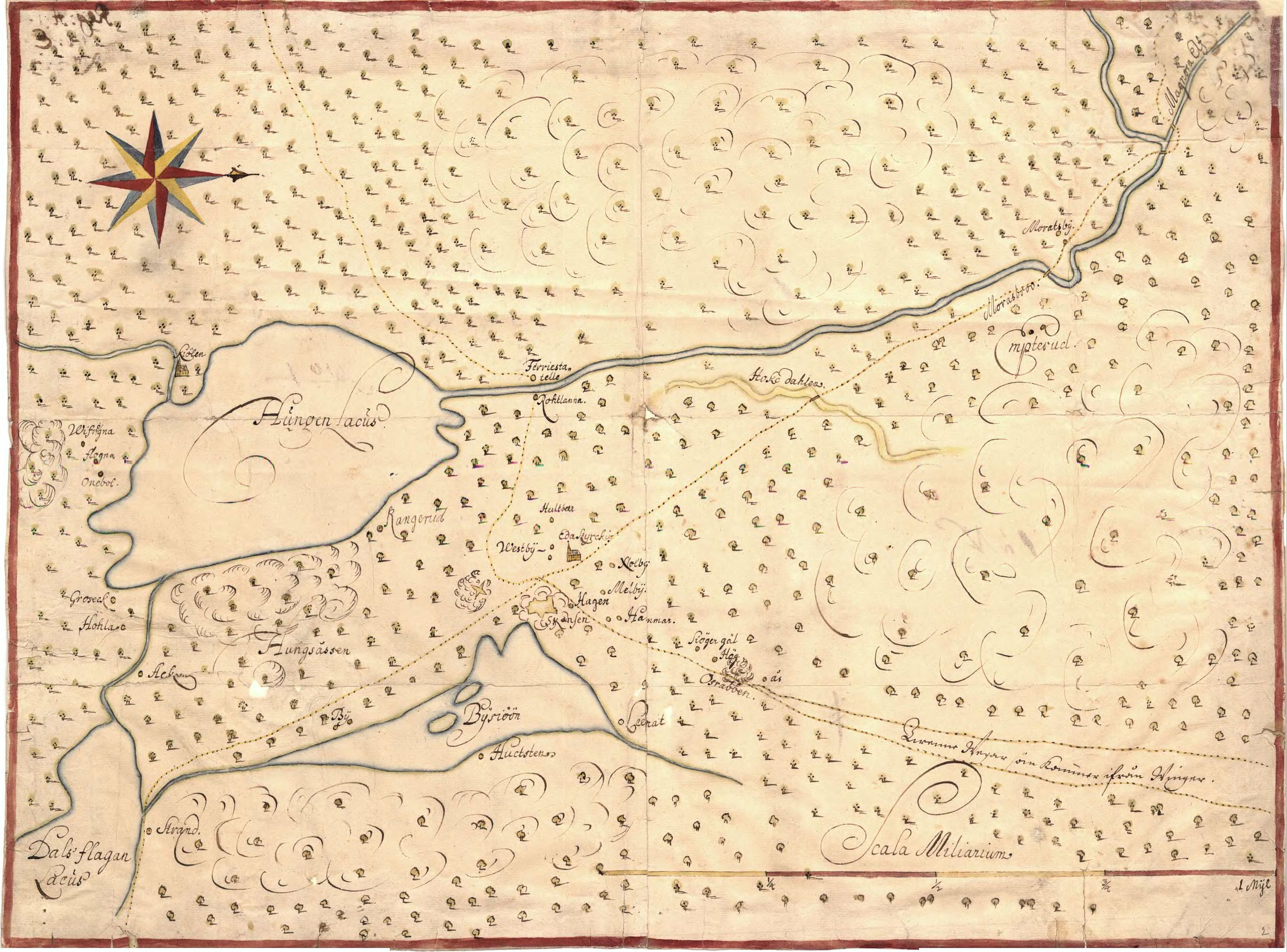
- Map from the 17th century (west is toward the top) over the area around Eda and the lakes Hugn and Bysjön. Source: Krigsarkivet
Date	22 December 1644
Location	Eda, Värmland, Sweden 59°49′N 12°21′E
Result	Dano-Norwegian victory
Territorial changes	Bysjön is captured by Dano-Norwegian forces

Belligerents
Denmark–Norway	Swedish Empire

Commanders and leaders
Hannibal Sehested	Lorentz Hansson

Strength
4,000; 5–6 guns	Several hundred men

Casualties and losses
300 killed 60 wounded	30–50 killed

The Battle of Bysjön was fought between Swedish and, for the most part, Norwegian troops on 22 December 1644. The battle took place on the ice of the frozen Lake Bysjön in the parish of Eda (Eda socken, Värmland) in Värmland, Sweden. The battle was part of the Torstenson War (1643–1645), known locally as the Hannibal Feud (Hannibalsfejden) between Sweden and Denmark-Norway. The Dano-Norwegian victory meant the invading army could potentially continue into Värmland and Dalsland.

== Background ==
In the autumn 1643 Field Marshal Lennart Torstensson (1603–1651), by order of the Swedish Council of the Realm, led the Swedish army which was then embroiled in the Thirty Years' War into Danish Jutland, initiating the Torstenson War. To ease the military pressure in Denmark, Hannibal Sehested (1609–1666), Governor-general of Norway, began preparations for military operations against Sweden along the Norwegian border, from Jämtland to Gothenburg. These operations, later called the Hannibal Feud, would force Sweden to divert forces from Denmark to defend the border.

In January 1644, orders were sent to the governors of the Swedish border counties to establish beacons and frontier guards to defend the border. Meanwhile, Sehested led a Dano-Norwegian force over the Swedish border.

The county governor of Värmland, Colonel Olof Stake (1593–1664), was ordered to keep 100 men posted on the border. When the local farmers saw the bonfires lit or heard church bells ringing, they were to gather at predetermined locations. On the road between the Norwegian parish of Vinger in Hedmark (near present-day Kongsvinger) and Karlstad in Värmland, the border was fortified by building a redoubt at Morast near present-day Charlottenberg during the winter and spring of 1644.

On the Norwegian side of the road corresponding preparations with beacons and redoubts at Magnor and Midtskog in Hedmark. Sehested also pushed for the equipment of a standing Norwegian army, which was formally established in 1641 but whose six regiment were not fully trained. In 1644 the size of the Norwegian army grew, and in November Sehested attacked Värmland with 4,480 men and 18 cannon.

== Prelude ==
The redoubt at Morast was captured quickly on 18 November without losses on either side. The commandant and crew were taken prisoner. The Norwegians remained at Morast until mid-December. The Swedish side took advantage of this time by felling trees across roads, to hinder the approaching soldiers. The winter road over the frozen Lake Bysjön was obstructed by cutting up the ice across the lake between the villages By and Vittensten. The sawn ice was used to build a breastwork, giving the Swedes a strong defensive position. The defense was led by Captain Lorentz Hansson of the Närke-Värmland Regiment.

On 17 December the Norwegian force left Morast and marched south to Eda church, making camp at Hammar on the north shore of Lake Bysjön. On 19 December Norwegian infantry marched out on the ice while the cavalry attempted to get around both sides of the lake. Skirmishes took place throughout the day both at the felled trees and on the ice. With minor losses on either side, the Norwegians fell back when darkness fell.

== Battle ==
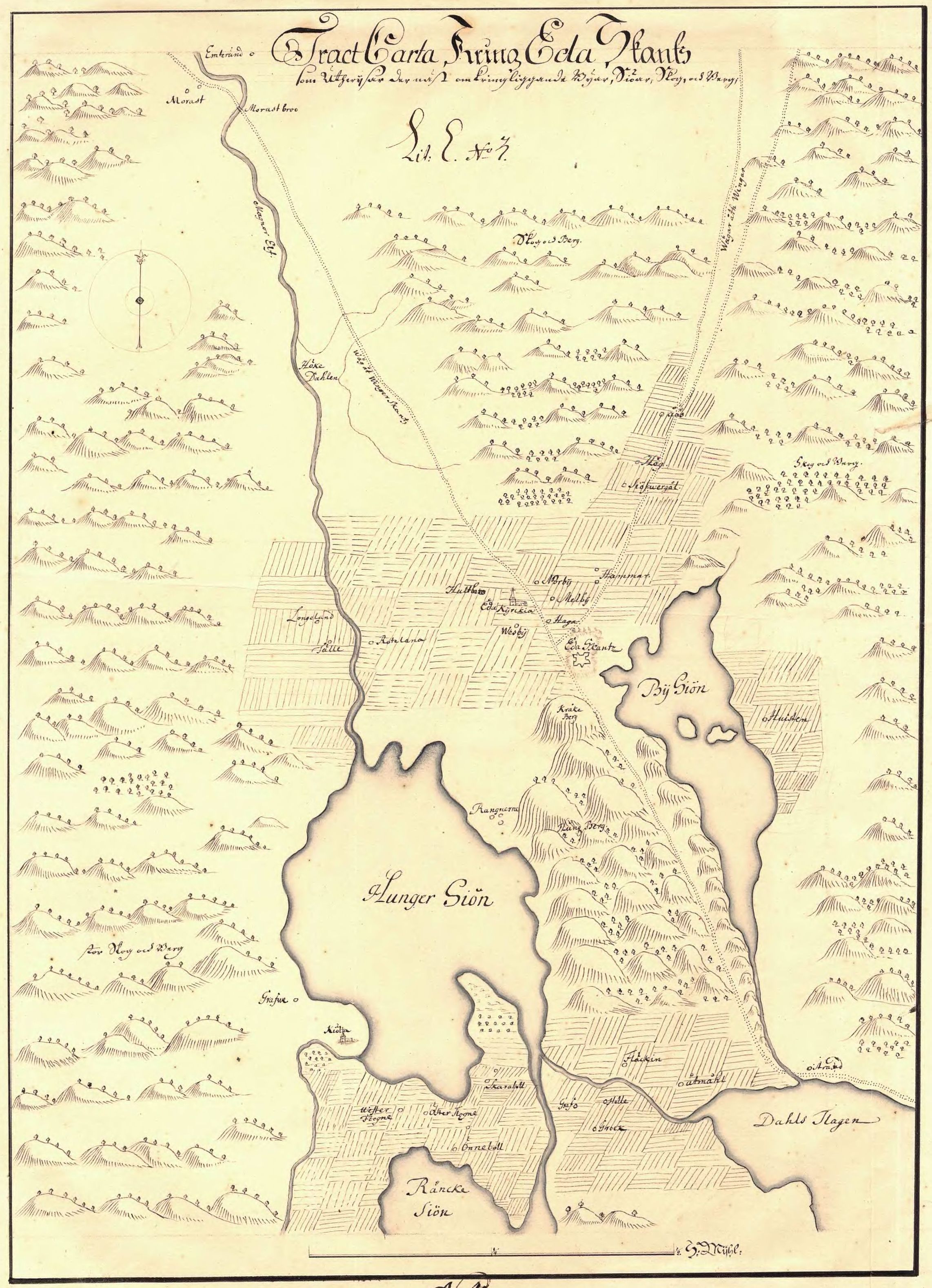
Map of the area of the parish of Eda circa 1700

Early in the morning on Sunday 22 December, the Dano–Norwegian soldiers under the command of Sehestedt marched out on the ice again. The Dano–Norwegian forces were estimated to be about 4,000 infantry and cavalrymen, as well as 5 or 6 cannon. The local farmers were at the opening in the lake ice, with two companies of cavalry and a few hundred Finnish soldiers on their flanks. The left wing was standing at Skogslund on the western shore of the lake, while the right wing was on the eastern shore, where steep cliffs plunged into the water. The Norwegians made repeated attempts to cross the opening with long boards, with no success. Their vulnerable position on the ice caused major Norwegian losses.

At sunset, a number of factors made it possible for the Norwegian soldiers to break through. The Swedes were running out of bullets and gunpowder. Some of the defenders cut out the tin buttons of their clothes to use as bullets. Captain Hansson, who commanded the Swedish left wing, took a bullet in the shoulder and couldn't continue in command. The defending farmers became disordered and fled in different directions in the dark. A detachment of the Akershusiske Regiment commanded by Lieutenant Colonel Georg Reichwein (1593–1667) finally managed to get around and occupy a hill west of the lake, from which they could fire flanking fire at the Swedish barricade. A contemporary account described the sequence of events: "The Peasants had to save themselves by fleeing and each went home to his Home."

The Swedish cavalry east of the lake could not be used and retreated southeastward to the parish of Frykerud ( Frykerud socken). The Norwegian soldiers made their night camp at the former Swedish cavalry pickets at By while others made camp at Åmot (present-day Åmotfors.)

== Aftermath ==
Between 30 and 50 Swedes were killed during the battle. On the Norwegian side 60 wounded men were carried back to the Midtskog redoubt, and about 300 are estimated to have been killed due to their exposed position on the ice.

The news of the defeat caused alarm in Sweden, and in a letter from Kyrkerud on 24 December, Olof Stake urgently requested reinforcements from Gabriel Oxenstierna, Lord High Steward of Sweden (1587–1640). Another letter from Berendt Olsson to an accountant, Pederson, in Karlstad on 23 December reads: "I don't know what to do. If help doesn't come soon, Karlstad and the whole country will be lost."

The victory was both the Norwegian army's first and Sehested's first on the battlefield, writing later that:

I myself have had the honor, of receiving from the soldiers of Olof Stake for New Year, two bullets through the cap on my head, although without injury.

Sehested also wrote that the way to Karlstad now lay open, and between this city and Stockholm there were no troops. In Copenhagen, word spread that he was already on his way to Stockholm. In reality, his strength was too small, and he had to reckon with the risk of being cut off from Norway. Therefore, he went south and made his headquarters at the rectory of the parish of Sillerud in Årjäng, with the option of proceeding to Karlstad or south towards Dalsland.

== Sources ==
- Vessberg, Vilhelm (1900) Bidrag till historien om Sveriges krig med Danmark 1643-1645. 2 : Kriget på norska (Stockholm)
- C.O.Munthe (1901) Hannibalsfejden 1644-1645. Den norske haers bloddåb (Kristiania: Grøndahl)

== Related reading ==
- Furtenbach, Börje (1956) Eda skansar : Värmlands gränsförsvar genom tiderna (Stockholm: Hörsta)
