= Your Bad Reputation =

1922 film

- Directed by: Franz Eckstein
- Written by: Marie Madeleine (novel); Rosa Porten
- Starring: Werner Funck; Olga Limburg; Paul Graetz
- Cinematography: Franz Stein
- Production company: National Film
- Distributed by: National Film
- Release date: 22 February 1922
- Country: Germany
- Languages: Silent; German intertitles

Your Bad Reputation (German: Ihr schlechter Ruf) is a 1922 German silent drama film directed by Franz Eckstein and starring Werner Funck, Olga Limburg and Paul Graetz.

The film's sets were designed by the art director Adolf von Marées.

== Cast ==
- Werner Funck as Baron Herbert von Melzow
- Olga Limburg as Sascha von Rothenburg
- Paul Graetz as Robert Zenker
- Vicky Werckmeister as Olga
- Olga Engl as Frau von Gellin
- Karl Falkenberg as Assessor von Heer
- Hermann Vallentin as Baron von Karwitz
- Rosa Porten

== Bibliography ==
- Paolo Caneppele. Entscheidungen der Tiroler Filmzensur 1919-1920-1921: mit einem Index der in Tirol verbotenen Filme 1916–1922. Film Archiv Austria, 2002.
