= The Ascent of Little Lilian =

1925 film

- Directed by: Fred Sauer
- Written by: Jane Bess
- Starring: Maria Zelenka; Bruno Kastner; Georg Baselt
- Cinematography: Marius Holdt
- Music by: Willy Schmidt-Gentner
- Production company: Savoy-Film
- Distributed by: Bavaria Film
- Release date: 9 January 1925
- Country: Germany
- Languages: Silent; German intertitles

The Ascent of Little Lilian (German: Aufstieg der kleinen Lilian) is a 1925 German silent film directed by Fred Sauer and starring Maria Zelenka, Bruno Kastner and Georg Baselt.

The film's art direction was by Julian Ballenstedt.

== Cast ==
- Maria Zelenka
- Bruno Kastner
- Georg Baselt
- Toni Tetzlaff
- Gerty King
- Margarete Kupfer
- Marija Leiko
- Theodor Loos
- Hermann Picha
- Eugen Rex
- Fritz Kampers
- Anna von Palen

== Bibliography ==
- Elsaesser, Thomas; Wedel, Michael, eds. (1999). The BFI companion to German cinema. London: British Film Institute. ISBN 978-0-85170-750-1.
