= Vineta, the Sunken City =

1923 film

- Directed by: Werner Funck
- Cinematography: Hans Bloch; Willy Großstück; Paul Holzki
- Production company: Primus-Film
- Distributed by: Primus-Film
- Release date: 21 December 1923
- Country: Germany
- Languages: Silent; German intertitles

Vineta, the Sunken City (German: Vineta. Die versunkene Stadt) is a 1923 German silent drama film directed by Werner Funck. The title refers to the legendary city of Vineta.

The film's art direction was by Gustav A. Knauer.

== Cast ==
In alphabetical order

- Stella Arbenina
- Gustav Diessl
- Evi Eva
- Ernst Hofmann
- Cläre Lotto
- Ernst Pröckl
- Emil Rameau
- Eugen Rex
- Heinrich Schroth
- Wolfgang Zilzer

== Bibliography ==
- Grange, William (2008). Cultural Chronicle of the Weimar Republic. Lanham, MD: Scarecrow Press. ISBN 978-0-8108-5967-8.
