= Not of the Woman Born =

- Directed by: Franz Eckstein; Rosa Porten
- Produced by: Viggo Larsen; Wanda Treumann
- Starring: Ferry Eschenauer; Helene Stein; Conrad Veidt
- Production company: Treumann-Larsen-Film
- Release date: October 1918
- Country: Germany
- Languages: Silent; German intertitles

Not of the Woman Born (German: Der nicht vom Weibe Geborene) is a 1918 German silent film directed by Franz Eckstein and Rosa Porten and starring Ferry Eschenauer, Helene Stein, and Conrad Veidt.

== Cast ==
- Ferry Eschenauer as Junker Caspar
- Helene Stein as Sibyllas Kammerfrau Brigitte
- Conrad Veidt as Satan
- Rolf Nordegg as Konrad
- Hermann Seldeneck as Ulrich Freiherr von Eynsidel
- Ly Neumann as Tochter Walpurga
- Ernst Wehlau as Graf Hermann von Castell
- Gustav Schmitt as alter Diener
- Sylva Mann as junge Zigeunerin Prisca

== Bibliography ==
- Bock, Hans-Michael & Bergfelder, Tim. The Concise CineGraph. Encyclopedia of German Cinema. Berghahn Books, 2009.
