= The Black Star (film) =

1922 film directed by James Bauer

- Directed by: James Bauer
- Written by: Sven Elvestad (novel); Armin Petersen
- Produced by: Hans Mierendorff
- Starring: Hans Mierendorff; Werner Funck
- Production company: Lucifer Film
- Release date: 1 July 1922
- Country: Germany
- Languages: Silent; German intertitles

The Black Star (German: Der schwarze Stern) is a 1922 German silent film directed by James Bauer and starring Hans Mierendorff and Werner Funck.

== Cast ==
- Dora Bergner
- Werner Funck
- John Gottowt
- Victor Horwitz
- Hans Mierendorff
- Rolf Prasch

== Bibliography ==
- Goble, Alan (1999). The Complete Index to Literary Sources in Film. Berlin: Walter de Gruyter. ISBN 978-3-11-095194-3.
