= Women and Banknotes =

1926 film

- Directed by: Fritz Kaufmann
- Written by: Ruth Goetz
- Cinematography: Reimar Kuntze
- Production company: Transatlantische Film
- Distributed by: Deulig-Verleih
- Release date: January 1926
- Country: Germany
- Languages: Silent; German intertitles

Women and Banknotes (German:Frauen und Banknoten) is a 1926 German silent film directed by Fritz Kaufmann.

The film's art direction was by Fritz Kraenke.

== Cast ==
In alphabetical order

- Gerd Briese
- Siegfried Dessauer
- Angelo Ferrari
- Louis Ralph
- Fred Stranz
- Ruth Weyher
- Maria Zelenka
