= Love and Passion =

1921 film

- Directed by: Martin Hartwig
- Written by: Artur Landsberger
- Starring: Conrad Veidt; Maria Zelenka; Heinrich Schroth
- Cinematography: Hans Kämpfe
- Production company: Vera-Filmwerke
- Distributed by: Martin Dentler
- Release date: February 1, 1921
- Country: Germany
- Languages: Silent; German intertitles

Love and Passion (German: Liebestaumel) is a 1921 German silent drama film directed by Martin Hartwig and starring Conrad Veidt, Maria Zelenka and Heinrich Schroth. It is now considered a lost film.

The film's sets were designed by the art director George Meyer.

== Cast ==
- Conrad Veidt as Jalenko, the Gypsy
- Maria Zelenka
- Margarete Lanner
- Heinrich Schroth
- Gustav Adolf Semler
- Erich Ziegel

== Bibliography ==
- John T. Soister. Conrad Veidt on Screen: A Comprehensive Illustrated Filmography. McFarland, 2002.
