= Circus People =

1922 film directed by William Kahn

- Directed by: William Kahn
- Written by: William Kahn; Robert Heymann
- Produced by: William Kahn
- Starring: Anita Berber; Charles Willy Kayser; Eduard von Winterstein
- Cinematography: Ivar Petersen
- Production company: William Kahn-Film
- Distributed by: UFA
- Release date: 30 April 1922
- Country: Germany
- Languages: Silent; German intertitles

Circus People (German: Die vom Zirkus) is a 1922 German silent drama film directed by William Kahn and starring Anita Berber, Charles Willy Kayser and Eduard von Winterstein.

The film's sets were designed by the art director August Rinaldi.

== Cast ==
- Anita Berber as Die Zirkusdiva
- Charles Willy Kayser
- Eduard von Winterstein
- Eugen Burg
- Rudolf Del Zopp
- Toni Ebärg
- Karl Harbacher
- Ernst Hofmann
- Helena Makowska
- Julius Markow
- Heinrich Peer
- Ernst Pittschau
- Heddy Sven

== Bibliography ==
- Grange, William. Cultural Chronicle of the Weimar Republic. Scarecrow Press, 2008.
- Töteberg, Michael . Das Ufa-Buch. Zweitausendeins, 1992.
