= Hedwig Courths-Mahler =

German writer (1867–1950)

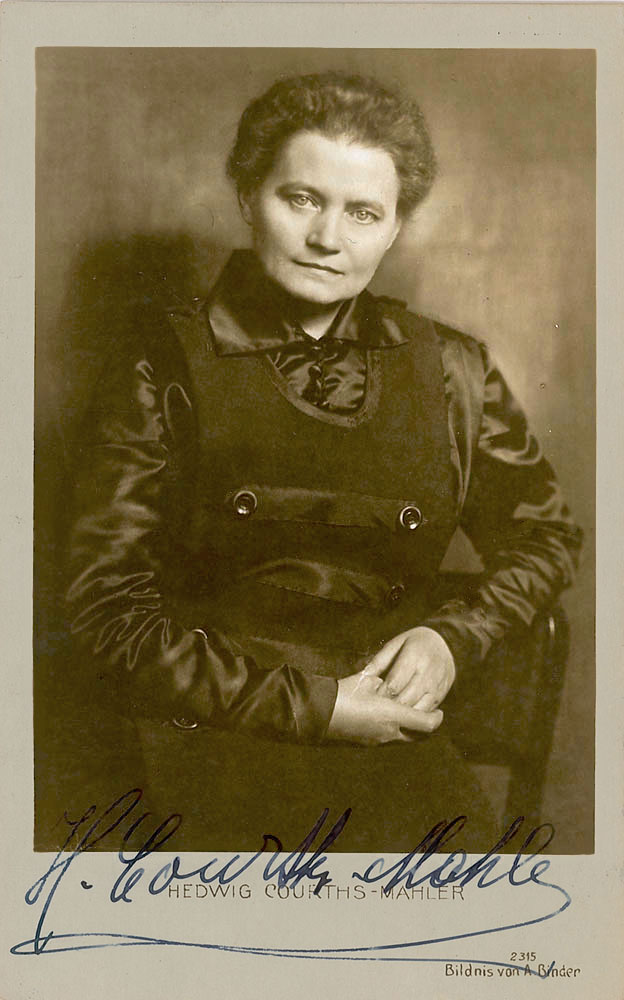

Hedwig Courths-Mahler (pronounced [ˈheːtvɪç ˌkʊʁts ˈmaːlɐ]), née Ernestine Friederike Elisabeth Mahler (February 18, 1867 in Nebra (Unstrut) – November 26, 1950 in Rottach-Egern, Bavaria) was a German writer of formula fiction romantic novels. She used the pseudonyms Relham, H. Brand, Gonda Haack, and Rose Bernd.

== Life and career ==
Courths-Mahler's novels generally follow a single pattern: socially disadvantaged characters overcome class differences through love. The lovers fight against adversity and are finally joined as a couple, gaining wealth and a high standing.

It is estimated that by the time of her death in 1950, 80 million copies of her works had been sold. During the 1970s, five of her novels were adapted as telemovies, made by and shown on Süddeutscher Rundfunk. Only one of her novels, Die Perlenschnur (1927), has been translated into English, as The String of Pearls (Philadelphia: J. B. Lippincott, 1929).

Despite Courths-Mahler's traditional perspective on male-female relationships and criticism of the clichés in her oeuvre, her books still enjoy a broad, largely female readership. They continue to be reprinted in dime novel format by the genre fiction publisher Bastei Lübbe, making her the most popular female German writer by number of sold copies.

== Literary works ==
- Die wilde Ursula (novel, 1912)
- Was Gott zusammenfügt (novel, 1913)
- Die Bettelprinzeß (novel, 1914)
- Der tolle Hassberg (1916)
- Griseldis (novel, 1916)
- Ich will (novel, 1916)
- Meine Käthe (novel, 1917)
- Eine ungeliebte Frau (novel, 1918)
- Die schöne Unbekannte (novel, 1918)
- Der Scheingemahl (novel, 1919)
- Das stille Weh (1919)
- Die Herrin von Retzbach (1920)
- Im Buchengrund (1920)
- Wenn Wünsche töten könnten (1925)
- Die Flucht vor der Ehe (novel, 1934)
- Die verstossene Tochter

== Films ==
- Das stille Weh (1919)
- You Are the Life (1921)
- Your Brother's Wife (1921)
- Liebe und Ehe (1923)
- Lena Warnstetten (1925)
- Eine ungeliebte Frau (1974, TV film)
- Griseldis (1974, TV film)
- Der Scheingemahl (1974, TV film)
- Die Kriegsbraut (1974, TV film)
- Die Bettelprinzess (1974, TV film)
- Durch Liebe erlöst (2005, TV film)
