= Set Me Free (1924 film) =

1924 film

- Grete Reinwald, Carl Auen
- Directed by: Erich Eriksen
- Produced by: Willi Herrmann
- Starring: Grete Reinwald; Carl Auen; Anna von Palen
- Cinematography: Franz Stein
- Production company: National Film
- Distributed by: National Film
- Release date: 31 October 1924
- Country: Germany
- Languages: Silent; German intertitles

Set Me Free (German: Gib mich frei) in a 1924 German silent film directed by Erich Eriksen and starring Grete Reinwald, Carl Auen, and Anna von Palen.

The film's sets were designed by the art director Max Frick.

== Cast ==
- Grete Reinwald as Lisa Limbach
- Carl Auen as Baron Ronald von Stolle-Hechingen
- Karl Elzer as Konsul Limbach
- Anna von Palen as Anna von Rahnsdorf
- Ellen Plessow as Baroness von Eppendorf
- Erich Briese as Hauptmann Neuendorf
- Lisa Demand as Konsulin Limbach
- Sigrid Kara as Zofe bei Limbach
- Kurt Orwa as Kurt Mallwitz
- Grete Wallicht as Frau Regierungsrat Ort
- Sonja Wernsdorf as Ronalds Mutter

== Bibliography ==
- Gerhard Lamprecht. Deutsche Stummfilme, Volume 8.
