= Franz Stein =

German actor (1880–1958)

- Born: 29 July 1880; Cologne, German Empire
- Died: 12 February 1958 (aged 77); West Berlin, West Germany
- Occupations: Cinematographer, actor
- Years active: 1917–1955 (film)

Franz Stein (1880–1958) was a German cinematographer and film actor. During the silent era he shot a number of films, many of them for National Film. After 1925 his film appearances were exclusively as an actor.

== Selected filmography ==
=== Cinematographer ===
- Lotte Lore (1921)
- Your Brother's Wife (1921)
- Your Bad Reputation (1922)
- La Boheme (1923)
- The Red Rider (1923)
- Maud Rockefeller's Bet (1924)
- The Doomed (1924)
- Set Me Free (1924)
- Za La Mort (1924)
- The Proud Silence (1925)
- Hedda Gabler (1925)
- Lena Warnstetten (1925)
- Battle of the Butterflies (1924)

=== Actor ===
- The Catwalk (1927) - Landrat von Krotkeim
- The Old Fritz (1928) - Lordmarschall Keith
- Luther (1928)
- Fair Game (1928) - Regisseur Finke
- Robert and Bertram (1928) - 2. Vagabund
- Die von der Scholle sind (1928)
- The Lord of the Tax Office (1929) - Udo von Langwitzs Vater
- Andreas Hofer (1929) - Pater Haspinger
- The Way Through the Night (1929)
- Marriage in Name Only (1930)
- Wibbel the Tailor (1931) - Nachtwächter
- M (1931) - Minister
- The Trunks of Mr. O.F. (1931) - Gesangslehrer
- The Eleven Schill Officers (1932)
- Unheimliche Geschichten (1932) - Kreisel in der Irrenanstalt
- The Black Hussar (1932) - Der Spion
- The First Right of the Child (1932)
- The Lake Calls (1933) - Der alte Jansen
- The Testament of Dr. Mabuse (1933)
- Music in the Blood (1934)
- Love and the First Railway (1934)
- The Two Seals (1934) - Dr.Spärlich
- The Gypsy Baron (1935)
- The Bird Seller (1935)
- A Pair of Lovers (1935)
- The Girl from the Marsh Croft (1935) - Vater Christmann
- Frisians in Peril (1935) - Christian Kröger
- Pillars of Society (1935) - Ein Bürger
- Augustus the Strong (1936) - Superintendent
- Soldaten - Kameraden (1936)
- Das schöne Fräulein Schragg (1937) - Schreiber
- Madame Bovary (1937) - Herzog de Laverrière
- To New Shores (1937) - Puritaner
- La Habanera (1937) - Falk
- Der nackte Spatz (1938) - Engel - Schneidermeister
- Spaßvögel (1939) - Kimpel
- Salonwagen E 417 (1939)
- Detours to Happiness (1939) - Dr. Lehmann
- Die Geliebte (1939)
- The Life and Loves of Tschaikovsky (1939) - Dr. Ossorgin (uncredited)
- Robert Koch (1939) - Wissenschaftler im Pathologischen Institu
- Kornblumenblau (1939)
- Ein ganzer Kerl (1939) - Versicherungsbeamter
- My Aunt, Your Aunt (1939)
- Rheinische Brautfahrt (1939) - Hausknecht August
- The Girl at the Reception (1940) - Hauptschriftleiter Grimm
- Clothes Make the Man (1940)
- Frieder und Catherlieschen (1940)
- The Swedish Nightingale (1941) - Hofuhrmacher
- Rembrandt (1942) - Stadtschreiber
- Der große Schatten (1942) - Zeitungsredakteur
- Münchhausen (1943) - Leibjäger Rösemeyer (uncredited)
- Paracelsus (1943) - Doctor
- Die Zaubergeige (1944)
- Shiva und die Galgenblume (1945)
- The Adventures of Fridolin (1948) - Der Standesbeamte
- Knall and Fall as Detectives (1953) - Professor Brott
- The Star of Rio (1955) - (final film role)

== Bibliography ==
- Rolf Giesen. Nazi Propaganda Films: A History and Filmography. McFarland, 2003.
