= The Holy Lie =

1927 film

- Directed by: Holger-Madsen
- Written by: Karin Michaëlis (play); Bobby E. Lüthge
- Produced by: Carl Boese
- Starring: Otto Gebühr; Margarete Schlegel; Paul Bildt
- Cinematography: Karl Hasselmann
- Music by: Werner R. Heymann
- Production companies: Carl Boese-Film; Nationalfilm Produktion
- Distributed by: National Film
- Release date: 2 September 1927
- Country: Germany
- Languages: Silent; German intertitles

The Holy Lie (German: Die heilige Lüge) is a 1927 German silent film directed by Holger-Madsen and starring Otto Gebühr, Margarete Schlegel, and Paul Bildt.

The film's art direction was by Max Knaake.

== Cast ==
- Otto Gebühr as Kapitän Uwe Möller
- Margarete Schlegel as Ingrid
- Paul Bildt as Dr. Gustav Flemming
- Eduard Rothauser as Professor Johanssen
- Margarete Kupfer as Mrs. Kennan
- Alexander Murski as Mr. Kennan
- Gyula Szőreghy
- Sybill Morel as Frau Lind
- Maria Mindzenty as Helga
- Hans Brausewetter as Erik
- Oskar Homolka as Jack
- Hans Heinrich von Twardowski as Janus
- Rudolf Lettinger as Landarzt
- Erik Hanson as Bill

== Bibliography ==
- Grange, William (2008). Cultural Chronicle of the Weimar Republic. Lanham, MD: Scarecrow Press. ISBN 978-0-8108-5967-8.
