= Franz Eckstein =

German film director

- Born: 2 April 1878; Leipzig, Saxony, German Empire
- Died: February 1945 (aged 66); Bauerhufen, Pomerania, Germany
- Occupations: Director, writer
- Years active: 1914–1928 (film)

Franz Eckstein (2 April 1878 – February 1945) was a German screenwriter and film director of the silent era. He made a number of films for the National Film company during the 1920s. He was married to the actress Rosa Porten, sister of Henny Porten.

== Selected filmography ==
- The Newest Star of Variety (1917)
- The Coquette (1917)
- Film Kathi (1918)
- Not of the Woman Born (1918)
- Lotte Lore (1921)
- Your Brother's Wife (1921)
- You Are the Life (1921)
- Your Bad Reputation (1922)
- Maud Rockefeller's Bet (1924)
- Battle of the Butterflies (1924)
- Hedda Gabler (1925)
- The Girl from Abroad (1927)

== Bibliography ==
- Reimer, Robert C. & Reimer, Carol J. The A to Z of German Cinema. Scarecrow Press, 2010.
