= The Hungarian Princess =

1923 film

- Directed by: Werner Funck
- Written by: Hanns Heinz Ewers; Alexander Schmidt; Roland Schmidt
- Starring: Margarete Schlegel; Adele Sandrock; Adolf Klein
- Cinematography: Fritz Arno Wagner
- Production company: Primus-Film
- Release date: 22 March 1923
- Country: Germany
- Languages: Silent; German intertitles

The Hungarian Princess (German: Die Magyarenfürstin) is a 1923 German silent film directed by Werner Funck and starring Margarete Schlegel, Adele Sandrock and Adolf Klein.

The film's sets were designed by the art director Carl Ludwig Kirmse.

== Cast ==
- Margarete Schlegel
- Adele Sandrock
- Adolf Klein
- Eugen Rex
- Ferdinand Hart
- Leonhard Haskel
- Martin Herzberg
- Max Pohl
- Emil Rameau

== Bibliography ==
- Gerhard Lamprecht. Deutsche Stummfilme, Volume 8.
