= Margarete Schlegel =

German actress (1899–1987)

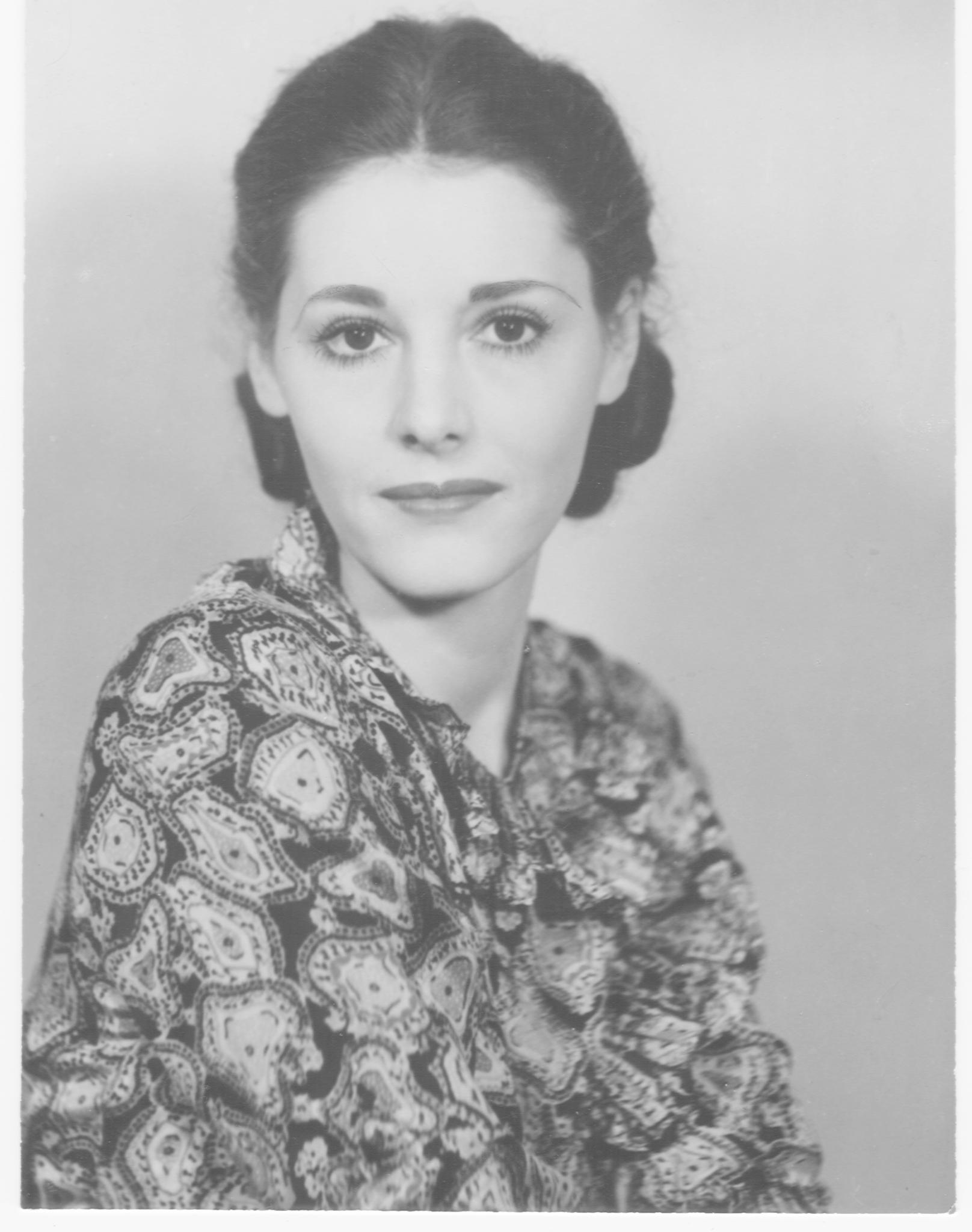
- Schlegel in 1946
- Born: Margarethe Sylva Elisabeth Schlegel; 31 December 1899; Bromberg, West Prussia, German Empire (now Bydgoszcz, Poland)
- Died: 15 July 1987 (aged 87); Saltdean, England
- Occupations: Actress; singer
- Years active: 1917–1955
- Spouse: Hermann Joachim Levy (m. 1924; died 1949)
- Children: 1

Margarethe Sylva Elisabeth Wisniewski (née Schlegel, 31 December 1899 – 15 July 1987), known professionally as Margarete Schlegel, was a German theatre and film actress and soprano operetta singer.

== Early life ==
The sixth of seven children and the third of four girls, Margarethe Sylva Elisabeth Schlegel was born at 11:45pm on 31 December 1899 in Bromberg, West Prussia, German Empire, (now Bydgoszcz, Poland) to a German-speaking Prussian-Polish Catholic family. Her father was Augustin Heinrich Schlegel (1865–1934), who legally changed the family surname from Wisniewski upon relocating them to Berlin in 1904, while her mother was Anna Agatha Schlegel (née Garski, 1864–1940).

== Career ==
=== Germany ===
Naturally beautiful and talented (she could sing, dance and act well from an early age), Schlegel sought a chorus role in theatre in 1917 as a way of earning extra money for her family while still a schoolgirl due to the privations of war. This soon led to a starring role in Charley's Aunt at the Thalia Theatre and later both serious and comic roles at the Deutsche Theater in Berlin, where she was trained and mentored by theatre director Max Reinhardt.

After the Great War, she was frequently cast in Weimar silent films by the pioneering cinema directors F. W. Murnau and E. A. Dupont and in whose films she worked with noted actors Bela Lugosi and Conrad Veidt, all of whom later left for Hollywood along with writer and director Billy Wilder, who co-wrote the screenplay of her last German film, a romantic operetta comedy called Das Blaue vom Himmel. The film was released in December 1932 just prior to Hitler's ascent to power and therefore not subject to Nazi dictates. Her best known and penultimate film was Phil Jutzi's morality play Berlin-Alexanderplatz (1931) which was remade as a German TV miniseries by Rainer Werner Fassbinder in 1980. In all, she appeared in 35 silent films and three sound films of differing styles during the Weimar era.

During the 1920s, she continued to star in theatre roles and operettas, such as Franz Lehár's Merry Widow and Gypsy Love. Her soprano repertoire included arias and lieder by Offenbach, Puccini, Handel, Brahms, Richard Strauss and Johann Strauss (see listing below), which she performed in recitals and radio broadcasts in addition to the musical numbers she sang in sound feature films.

When her husband was dismissed from his professorship at the Technische Hochschule in Charlottenburg (now Technische Universität Berlin) in May 1933 and his academic books and novels written under the pseudonym Hermann Lint were burned by the Nazis, he travelled to Britain to give the Sidney Ball Memorial Lecture at Oxford University and as a visiting professor at King's College, Cambridge at the invitation of the Professor of Economic History, John Clapham. Although Ms Schlegel was offered many opportunities to join her Weimar expatriate film colleagues in Hollywood from the late 1920s onwards, she declined these offers to emigrate to the US. In 1935 she was offered the chance by SS Head Heinrich Himmler to continue her film career under the Third Reich on the condition that as an Aryan she divorced her assimilated Jewish husband (he was baptised as a Lutheran at the age of 14 in 1895 under the oversight of his older sister's husband, the research chemist Prof Arnold Carl Reissert), but instead fled with her son to join her husband in Britain. In consequence, in July 1938 the Nazis officially proscribed her films, which could no longer be shown publicly in Germany or its occupied territories. At about the same time, her husband was added to Hitler's so-called Black Book, the death list of opponents of the Third Reich who would be arrested upon the anticipated Nazi occupation of Britain after Operation Sea Lion. Also in 1938 her husband's former family residence and marital home in Tiergarten, "Villa Kabrun", was seized by the Nazis for use as the foreign embassy of the Kingdom of Yugoslavia in the putative "world capital", Germania.

== Career in Britain ==
After arriving in England, she became a featured soprano on BBC Radio in operas and operettas by Offenbach, Lehar and Horton in the late 1930s. During WW2 she broadcast anti-Nazi German-language propaganda radio programs for BBC Europe which were heard across the Continent. After her husband died suddenly in 1949 from a heart attack, she remarried and moved to Saltdean on the Sussex coast in England. In the 1950s she continued broadcasting for BBC Radio, singing in operettas and recitals such as "The Queen of Song" about the life of Adelina Patti. She also sang and spoke in German language educational radio programs for the BBC from 1938 onwards.

== Personal life and death ==
In 1924, Schlegel married the assimilated Jewish-Prussian political economist, Prof Hermann Joachim Levy. In 1926 they had a son, Hermann Martin Heinrich Levy, who was baptised Catholic.

Schlegel died on 15 July 1987 after being very active in local Catholic church affairs for many years.

== Filmography ==
- Prince Cuckoo [Prinz Kuckuck] (1919)
- The Four Devils [Die Benefiz-Vorstellung der vier Teufel] (1920)
- The Head of Janus (1920)
- The Man with the Doll [Der Mann mit der Puppe] (1920)
- Christian Wahnschaffe (1920)
- Desire (1921)
- Kean (1921)
- Lotte Lore (1921)
- Deceiver of the People (1921)
- The Eternal Curse (1921)
- Your Brother's Wife (1921)
- David Copperfield (1922)
- Hannele's Journey to Heaven (1922)
- Madame de La Pommeraye's Intrigues (1922)
- The Kreutzer Sonata (1922)
- Love, Death and the Devil [Liebe, Tod und Teufel] (1922)
- Sodom's End [Sodoms Ende] (1922)
- The Dying City [Die sterbende Stadt] (1922)
- The Hungarian Princess (1923)
- The Ancient Law (1923)
- The Secret of the Racing Count [Das Geheimnis des Renngrafen] (1923)
- Irene of Gold (1923)
- Victim of Love (1923)
- Venetian Lovers (1925)
- The Shot in the Pavilion (1925)
- The Wonder of Creation [Wunder der Schöpfung] (1925)
- The Woman and Two Bachelors [Die Frauen zweier Junggesellen] (1925)
- The Big Heart [Det store hjerte - Danish production] (1925)
- The Bank Crash of Unter den Linden (1926)
- The Adventurers (1926)
- The Convicted (1927)
- The Holy Lie (1927)
- Two Under the Stars (1927)
- Single Mother (1928)
- The Customs Judge (1929)
- The Gypsy Chief (1929)
- The Song Is Ended (1930)
- Berlin-Alexanderplatz (1931)
- The Blue of Heaven (1932)

== Operatic repertoire ==
Composer	Title/Role	Parent Work/Opus
Puccini, G	Vissi d'arte, vissi d'amore	Tosca
Puccini, G	Un bel di vedremo	Madame Butterfly
Offenbach, J	The Doll Song (Olympia'a aria)	Tales of Hoffmann
Handel, GF	Ombra mai fu (Larghetto)	Xerxes
Gounod, CF / Bach, JS	Ave Maria (Meditation)	Musica et Memoria
Strauss, Richard	Standchen	Six Songs, Op 17 (No 2)
Strauss, Johann	Spiel ich die Unschuld vom land (The Country Innocent)	Die Fledermaus
Mozart, WA	Alleluia	Exsultate jubilate, K.165
Handel, GF	Amor gioie mi porge (Jealousy)	Duets
Handel, GF	Va speme infida pur (Fickle Hope)	Duets
D'Albert, E	Amor und Psyche (Myrtocle's aria)	Der Toten Augen
Reger, M	Zum Schlafen (The Golden Bird)	Op 76 (No 59)
Handel, GF	Tu la mia stella sei	Guilo Cesare
Handel, GF	Voi dolci aurette al cor	Tolomeo
Strauss, Johann	Fruhlingstimmen (voci di primavera)	Op 410
Strauss, Richard	Wiegenlied (Lullaby)	Five Lieder, Op 41 (no 1)
Strauss, Richard	Morgen! (Tomorrow)	Four Lieder, Op 27 (no 4)
Brahms, J	Minnelied (Love Song)	Op 71 (No 5)
Strauss, Richard	Traum durch die Dammerung (Dream in the twilight)	Three Lieder, Op 29 (No 1)
Strauss, Richard	Zueignung (Devotion)	Eight Lieder, Op 10 (No 1)
Papini, G	Caro mio ben	After Tommaso Giordani
Arditi, L	Sprich! (Parla!)	Waltz for Soprano
Lehar, F	Zorica (role)	Zigeunerliebe (Gypsy Love)
Lehar, F.	Hanna (role)	The Merry Widow

== Popular songs (English) ==
Composer	Title	Lyrics
Keel, F	Four Songs of Childhood	Walter de la Mare
	Reverie	
	Sleepy Head	
	John Mouldy	
	Bunches of Grapes	
Traditional French Song	Come Sweet Morning (Viens Aurore)	R H Elkin (English)
Sanderson, W	June is Calling	N Fielden
Ronald, L	Four Songs of the Hill	H Simpson
	Away on the hill there runs a stream	
	Come home my thoughts	
	At Dawn	
	A Little Winding Road	
Leslie-Smith, K	Always Song (Puritan Lullaby)	J Dyrenforth
Leoni, F	The Leaves of the Wind	G Cooper
Ronald, L	O Lovely Night!	E Teschemacher
Quilter, R	Amaryllis at the Fountain	Anon
White, M V	So We'll Go No More A Roving	Lord Byron
Forster, D	Dancing in Dreams in Vienna	E Lockton
Quilter, R	Love's Philosophy	Shelley
Traditional (arr Lehmann, L)	Annie Laurie	Anon
Quilter, R	Now Sleeps the Crimson Petal	Tennyson
Trad (arr Clutsam)	Come to the Dance	M Mervyn
Wertheimer, E	To A Mother (An Einer Mutter)	
Cadman, C W	At Dawning	N R Eberhart

== Bibliography ==
- Lennig, Arthur. The Immortal Count: The Life and Films of Bela Lugosi. University Press of Kentucky, 2003.
- Ragowski, Christian. The Many Faces of Weimar Cinema: Rediscovering Germany's Filmic Legacy. Camden House, 2010.
- Schlegel-Levy Family, Private Archives, (material dating from 1872 to 2005)
- Levy, Hermann Martin Heinrich. The Discarded Ladder: A Memoir, Unpublished MSS, 2000.
