= The Girl from Abroad =

1927 film

- Directed by: Franz Eckstein
- Written by: Rosa Porten; H.E. Wieslow
- Produced by: Willi Münzenberg
- Starring: Carl Auen; Frida Richard; Albert Steinrück
- Cinematography: Carl Drews
- Production company: Prometheus Film
- Release date: 24 January 1927
- Country: Germany
- Languages: Silent; German intertitles

The Girl from Abroad (German: Das Mädchen aus der Fremde) is a 1927 German silent film directed by Franz Eckstein and starring Carl Auen, Frida Richard and Albert Steinrück. The film was made by Prometheus Film, a German production company backed by the Soviet Union. It attracted little attention in the press, and soon disappeared from cinemas.

The film's sets were designed by the art director Jacek Rotmil.

== Cast ==
- Carl Auen
- Frida Richard
- Albert Steinrück
- Hermann Picha
- Lydia Potechina
- Nikolai Malikoff
- Carl Drews
- Robert Garrison
- Georges Blanvalet
- Ada Ruffo
- Sylvia Torf

== Bibliography ==
- Murray, Bruce Arthur. Film and the German Left in the Weimar Republic: From Caligari to Kuhle Wampe. University of Texas Press, 1990.
