= William Kahn =

German film director, screenwriter and film producer

- Born: 23 August 1882; Berlin, German Empire
- Died: 14 May 1959 (aged 76); Los Angeles, United States
- Occupations: Writer, Producer, Director
- Years active: 1915-1928 (film)

William Kahn (1882–1959) was a German screenwriter, film producer and director of the silent era.

== Selected filmography ==
- The Grehn Case (1916)
- The Sin of Helga Arndt (1916)
- Circus People (1922)
- The Girl Without a Conscience (1922)
- The Salvation Army Girl (1927)
- Girls, Beware! (1928)

== Bibliography ==
- Thomas Elsaesser & Michael Wedel. A Second Life: German Cinema's First Decades. Amsterdam University Press, 1996.
