= The Grehn Case =

1916 film directed by William Kahn

- Directed by: William Kahn
- Written by: William Kahn
- Produced by: William Kahn
- Starring: Reinhold Schünzel; Ernst Pittschau
- Production company: William Kahn-Film
- Distributed by: William Kahn-Film
- Release date: 1 May 1916
- Country: Germany
- Languages: Silent; German intertitles

The Grehn Case (German: Der Fall Grehn) is a 1916 German silent crime film directed by William Kahn and starring Reinhold Schünzel and Ernst Pittschau. A detective investigates the murder of a painter.

== Cast ==
- Reinhold Schünzel as Kriminalrat Rat Anheim
- Ernst Pittschau as Professor Herkdal
- Conrad Barden as Mahler Jan Grehn
- Gernot Bock-Stieber as Globetrotter Diaz Ramson
- Otto Collet
- August Rotter as van Gylhem
- Lo Vallis as Cläre Pontda

== Bibliography ==
- Bock, Hans-Michael & Bergfelder, Tim. The Concise CineGraph. Encyclopedia of German Cinema. Berghahn Books, 2009.
