= The Four Marriages of Matthias Merenus =

1924 film

- Directed by: Werner Funck
- Written by: Karl Hans Strobl (novel); Ruth Goetz
- Starring: Grete Reinwald; Rudolf Biebrach; Margarete Kupfer
- Production company: Primus-Film
- Distributed by: Primus-Film
- Release date: 7 February 1924
- Country: Germany
- Languages: Silent; German intertitles

The Four Marriages of Matthias Merenus (German: Die vier Ehen des Matthias Merenus) is a 1924 German silent comedy film directed by Werner Funck and starring Grete Reinwald, Rudolf Biebrach and Margarete Kupfer.

== Cast ==
- Grete Reinwald
- Rudolf Biebrach
- Margarete Kupfer
- Leonhard Haskel
- Ernst Hofmann
- Hans Unterkircher

== Bibliography ==
- Gerhard Lamprecht. Deutsche Stummfilme, Volume 8.
