= You Are the Life =

1921 film

- Directed by: Franz Eckstein
- Written by: Hedwig Courths-Mahler; Rosa Porten
- Starring: Erna Morena; Uschi Elleot; Lya De Putti
- Cinematography: Franz Stein
- Music by: Bruno Schulz
- Production company: National Film
- Release date: 7 August 1921
- Country: Germany
- Languages: Silent; German intertitles

You Are the Life (German: Du bist das Leben) is a 1921 German silent film directed by Franz Eckstein and starring Erna Morena, Uschi Elleot and Lya De Putti.

The film's sets were designed by the art director Artur Gunther.

== Cast ==
- Erna Morena
- Uschi Elleot
- Lya De Putti
- Olga Engl
- Werner Funck
- Ernst Pittschau

== Bibliography ==
- Bock, Hans-Michael & Bergfelder, Tim. The Concise CineGraph. Encyclopedia of German Cinema. Berghahn Books, 2009.
