= Your Brother's Wife =

1921 film

- Directed by: Franz Eckstein
- Written by: Hedwig Courths-Mahler; Rosa Porten
- Starring: Olaf Storm; Olga Limburg; Margarete Schlegel
- Cinematography: Franz Stein
- Production company: National Film
- Distributed by: National Film
- Release date: 3 August 1921
- Country: Germany
- Languages: Silent; German intertitles

Your Brother's Wife (German: Deines Bruders Weib) is a 1921 German silent film directed by Franz Eckstein and starring Olaf Storm, Olga Limburg and Margarete Schlegel.

== Cast ==
- Werner Funck
- Olga Limburg
- Auguste Prasch-Grevenberg
- Emil Rameau
- Margarete Schlegel
- Olaf Storm

== Bibliography ==
- Friedrich Feld. Fritz Rosenfeld, Filmkritiker. Filmarchiv Austria, 2007.
