= The Newest Star of Variety =

- Directed by: Franz Eckstein; Rosa Porten
- Written by: Rosa Porten
- Produced by: Viggo Larsen
- Starring: Rosa Porten; Reinhold Schünzel; Helene Voß
- Production company: Treumann-Larsen-Film
- Release date: May 1917
- Country: Germany
- Languages: Silent; German intertitles

The Newest Star of Variety (German: Der neueste Stern vom Variété) is a 1917 German silent film directed by Franz Eckstein and Rosa Porten.

== Cast ==
- Rosa Porten
- Reinhold Schünzel
- Helene Voß

== Synopsis ==
Rosa Porten plays the role of the variety artiste Stella Orlanda, an intrepid young woman manoeuvring between bourgeois mentality and the free spirit attributed to popular stage people.

== Bibliography ==
- Bock, Hans-Michael & Bergfelder, Tim. The Concise CineGraph. Encyclopedia of German Cinema. Berghahn Books, 2009.
