= The Bank Crash of Unter den Linden =

1926 film

- Directed by: Paul Merzbach
- Written by: Hugo Bettauer (novel); Robert Land; Paul Merzbach
- Produced by: Frederic Zelnik
- Starring: Alfred Abel; Hans Albers; Margarete Schlegel
- Cinematography: Frederik Fuglsang
- Production company: Deutsche Fox
- Distributed by: Deutsche Fox
- Release date: 8 January 1926
- Running time: 96 minutes
- Country: Germany
- Languages: Silent; German intertitles

The Bank Crash of Unter den Linden (German: Der Bankkrach unter den Linden) is a 1926 German silent drama film directed by Paul Merzbach and starring Alfred Abel, Hans Albers, and Margarete Schlegel. It was produced by the German subsidiary of the Fox Film Company.

The film's sets were designed by the art director Gustav A. Knauer.

== Cast ==
In alphabetical order

- Alfred Abel as Dr. Lothar Reimers
- Hans Albers as Fritz Bellmann
- Oreste Bilancia as Diplomat
- Ferdinand Bonn as Cellist Wolfgang Amadeus
- Carl Goetz as Martin Schoeller
- Karl Harbacher as Balthasar Obertimpfler
- Ellen Heel as Irma
- Margarete Kupfer as Frau Storchschnabel
- Paul Morgan as Zeitgenosse
- Albert Paulig as Graf Perlinsky
- Hermann Picha as Herr Storchschnabel
- Clementine Plessner as Tante Klothilde
- Anton Pointner as Baron Dorn
- Gerhard Ritterband as Banklehrling
- Margarete Schlegel as Grete
- Bruno Ziener as Dr. Schumann

== Bibliography ==
- Bock, Hans-Michael; Bergfelder, Tim, eds. (2009). The Concise Cinegraph: Encyclopaedia of German Cinema. New York: Berghahn Books. ISBN 978-1-57181-655-9.
