= The Coquette (film) =

1917 film

- Directed by: Franz Eckstein; Rosa Porten
- Written by: Rosa Porten
- Produced by: Viggo Larsen; Wanda Treumann
- Starring: Reinhold Schünzel; Eduard von Winterstein
- Music by: Siegbert Goldschmidt
- Production company: Treumann-Larsen Film
- Distributed by: Treumann-Larsen Film
- Release date: 19 July 1917
- Country: Germany
- Languages: Silent; German intertitles

The Coquette (German: Die Erzkokette) is a 1917 German silent comedy film directed by Franz Eckstein and Rosa Porten and starring Porten, Reinhold Schünzel, and Eduard von Winterstein. It premiered at the Marmorhaus in Berlin.

== Cast ==
- Reinhold Schünzel as Tertianer Rolf
- Rosa Porten
- Gustav von Wangenheim
- Eduard von Winterstein

== Bibliography ==
- Bock, Hans-Michael & Bergfelder, Tim. The Concise CineGraph. Encyclopedia of German Cinema. Berghahn Books, 2009.
