= Hedda Gabler (1925 film) =

1925 film

- Directed by: Franz Eckstein
- Written by: Franz Eckstein; Henrik Ibsen (play); Rosa Porten
- Starring: Asta Nielsen; Paul Morgan; Frida Richard
- Cinematography: Franz Stein
- Production company: National Film
- Distributed by: National-Film
- Release date: 30 March 1925
- Country: Germany
- Languages: Silent; German intertitles

Hedda Gabler is a 1925 German silent drama film directed by Franz Eckstein and starring Asta Nielsen, Paul Morgan and Frida Richard. It is based on Henrik Ibsen's 1891 play Hedda Gabler. The film was released on 30 March 1925.

== Cast ==
- Asta Nielsen as Hedda Gabler, Ehefrau von Tesman
- Paul Morgan as Dr. Jürgen Tesman
- Frida Richard as Juliane Tesman, die Tante
- Albert Steinrück as Gerichtsrat Brack
- Gregori Chmara as Eilert Lövborg
- Käthe Haack as Thea Elvsted
- Olga Limburg as die rote Diana
- Jeanette Bethge as Berte, Dienstmädchen
- Karl Balta

== Bibliography ==
- Reimer, Robert C. & Reimer, Carol J. The A to Z of German Cinema. Scarecrow Press, 2010.
