= Vineta (board game) =

Strategy board game

- Designers: Fabiano Onça; Mauricio Miyaji; Mauricio V. Gibrin
- Publishers: Winning Moves
- Players: 2 - 6
- Setup time: 10 minutes
- Playing time: 30 - 60 minutes
- Chance: Medium
- Age range: 12 and up
- Skills: Planning; Risk Analysis; Memory

Vineta is a strategy board game based loosely on the fabled island of Vineta. In the game, players take on the roles of Norse Gods trying to sink 8 of the 9 districts of Vineta with tidal waves while trying to save their followers. It was published by Winning Moves Games USA in 2008 as the fifth game in its Immortal Eyes line. This game is no longer in production.

== Gameplay ==
The goal of the game is to have the most points. Points are earned by keeping followers alive on the last island district at the end of the game, collecting them from sinking districts, collecting others' followers, and having your chosen district be the last one remaining.

Players start the game by getting two tiles, showing them their follower color and the island section they wish to protect. The follower houses are randomly placed around the board by the players and they each shuffle and draw seven cards from their decks. The game is played over 8 rounds with 3 turns in each round. Each turn, players lay a card they wish to play that turn face-down. The start player for the turn reveals and plays their card and the other players do the same, drawing back to seven cards after playing. Once all have played their cards, the start player token passes and the next turn begins.

There are two types of cards the players can play: Flood cards and Action cards. Flood cards are what players play on outer island districts into "storm rows" to try to sink that district that round. Action cards allow flood cards to be moved and discarded, as well as allow players to move follower houses and make the round shorter or longer by a turn. At the end of each round, the district with the highest total in its storm row sinks. In order of cards played in the row, the gods who contributed to that district sinking claim one follower house from the sinking district.

Play continues until eight of the nine districts of the island have been sunk. At that point, players reveal their tiles and final scoring occurs. Players gain three points per follower they saved on the final district, two points for each claimed off a sinking district, one for each other god's follower they claimed from sinking districts, and two to seven points if the last district is the one they were trying to save.

== Awards ==
- 2004 Concours International de Créateurs de Jeux de Société award winner (under the name of Waka-Waka Island).
