= Children's Tragedy =

1928 film

- Directed by: Phil Jutzi; Karl Lutz
- Written by: Stuart Josef Lutz
- Starring: Hermann Picha; Jaro Fürth; Maria Zelenka
- Cinematography: Karl Attenberger; Franz Koch
- Production company: Prometheus-Film
- Release date: January 1928
- Country: Germany
- Languages: Silent; German intertitles

Children's Tragedy (German: Kindertragödie) is a 1928 German silent drama film directed by Phil Jutzi and Karl Lutz and starring Hermann Picha, Jaro Fürth and Maria Zelenka. It was made by the Communist-backed studio Prometheus-Film.

== Cast ==
- Hermann Picha
- Jaro Fürth
- Maria Zelenka
- Holmes Zimmermann
- Hermi Lutz

== Bibliography ==
- Bock, Hans-Michael & Bergfelder, Tim. The Concise Cinegraph: Encyclopaedia of German Cinema. Berghahn Books, 2009.
