= The Convicted =

1927 film directed by Rudolf Meinert

- Directed by: Rudolf Meinert
- Written by: Erich Kraft; Rudolf Meinert
- Starring: Eugen Klöpfer; Margarete Schlegel; Albert Steinrück; Arnold Korff
- Cinematography: A.O. Weitzenberg
- Music by: Otto Stenzeel
- Production company: International Film-AG
- Distributed by: International Film-AG
- Release date: 1927
- Country: Germany
- Languages: Silent; German intertitles

The Convicted (German: Die Vorbestraften) is a 1927 German silent drama film directed by Rudolf Meinert and starring Eugen Klöpfer, Margarete Schlegel and Albert Steinrück. The film portrays a group of former prisoners who struggle to reintegrate into society.

== Cast ==
- Eugen Klöpfer - Karl Hartmann
- Margarete Schlegel
- Albert Steinrück
- Arnold Korff
- Benno von Arent
- Julius Falkenstein
- Leopold von Ledebur
- Hugo Döblin
- Harry Lamberts-Paulsen
- Hermann Picha
- Frida Richard
- Hedwig Wangel
- Maria Fein
- Erich Kaiser-Titz
- Stella Gojo
- John Mylong
- Arthur Wartan
- Henri De Vries

== Bibliography ==
- Bergfelder, Tim & Bock, Hans-Michael. The Concise Cinegraph: Encyclopedia of German. Berghahn Books, 2009.
- Rosenblum, Warren. Beyond the Prison Gates: Punishment & Welfare in Germany, 1850-1933. UNC Press Books, 2008.
