= The Blood of the Ancestors =

1920 film

- Directed by: Karl Gerhardt
- Written by: Johannes Brandt; Robert Wiene
- Produced by: Erich Pommer
- Starring: Robert Scholz; Harald Paulsen; Lil Dagover
- Cinematography: Willy Hameister
- Production company: Decla-Bioscop
- Distributed by: Decla-Bioscop
- Release date: 5 November 1920
- Country: Germany
- Languages: Silent; German intertitles

The Blood of the Ancestors (German: Das Blut der Ahnen) is a 1920 German silent film directed by Karl Gerhardt and starring Robert Scholz, Harald Paulsen, and Lil Dagover. It was shot at the Babelsberg Studios of Decla-Bioscop in Berlin. The film's art direction was by Hermann Warm.

== Cast ==
- Robert Scholz as Fürst Kasimir Schwijski
- Harald Paulsen as Jan Schwijski, der Sohn
- Lil Dagover as Fürstin Wanda Lubowiczka
- Lili Alexandra as Princesin Elisabeth
- Josef Rehberger as Graf Rimanski
- Maria Zelenka as Marja
- Jaro Fürth as Dr. Swedrowski

== Bibliography ==
- Jacobsen, Wolfgang. Babelsberg: das Filmstudio. Argon, 1994.
- Jung, Uli; Schatzberg, Walter (1999). Beyond Caligari: The Films of Robert Wiene. New York: Berghahn Books. ISBN 978-1-57181-156-1.
