= Erich Eriksen =

German film director

- Born: September 13, 1882; Berlin, German Empire
- Other name: Fritz Max Erich Joseph Eriksen
- Occupation: Director
- Years active: 1919–1929 (film)

Erich Eriksen was a German film director of the silent era.

== Selected filmography ==
- Maud Rockefeller's Bet (1924)
- Set Me Free (1924)
- Lena Warnstetten (1925)
- The Proud Silence (1925)
- Annemarie and Her Cavalryman (1926)
- Roses Bloom on the Moorland (1929)

== Bibliography ==
- Grange, William. Cultural Chronicle of the Weimar Republic. Scarecrow Press, 2008.
