= Bummellotte =

1922 film

- Directed by: Wolfgang Neff
- Produced by: Liddy Hegewald
- Cinematography: Marius Holdt
- Production company: Hegewald Film
- Distributed by: Hegewald Film
- Release date: 10 April 1922
- Country: Germany
- Languages: Silent; German intertitles

Bummellotte is a 1922 German silent film directed by Wolfgang Neff and starring Maria Zelenka.

== Cast ==
In alphabetical order

- Peter Arnolds as Henry
- Karl Elzer as Herr Kosemann
- Karl Falkenberg as Hochstapler Mr. Lengforth
- Maria Forescu as Frau Baum
- Willy Kaiser-Heyl
- Lina Salten as Justizratstochter
- Robert Scholz
- Maria Zelenka as Lotte

== Bibliography ==
- Rudmer Canjels. Distributing Silent Film Serials: Local Practices, Changing Forms, Cultural Transformation. Routledge, 2011.
