= Impostor (1921 film) =

1921 film

- Directed by: Werner Funck
- Written by: Carl Heinz Jarosy
- Starring: Paul Hartmann; Olga Chekhova
- Cinematography: Guido Seeber
- Production company: Akme-Film
- Release date: 12 May 1921
- Country: Germany
- Languages: Silent; German intertitles

Impostor (German: Hochstapler) is a 1921 German silent film directed by Werner Funck and starring Paul Hartmann and Olga Chekhova.

The film's sets were designed by the art director Carl R. Reiner.

== Cast ==
- Werner Funck
- Paul Hartmann
- Leonhard Haskel
- Albert Patry
- Olga Chekhova

== Bibliography ==
- Bock, Hans-Michael & Bergfelder, Tim. The Concise Cinegraph: Encyclopaedia of German Cinema. Berghahn Books, 2009.
