= The Proud Silence =

1925 film

- German: Das stolze Schweigen
- Directed by: Erich Eriksen
- Starring: Colette Brettel; Ernst Winar; Ernst Pittschau
- Cinematography: Franz Stein
- Production company: National Film
- Distributed by: National Film
- Release date: 27 March 1925
- Country: Germany
- Languages: Silent; German intertitles

The Proud Silence (German: Das stolze Schweigen) is a 1925 German silent film directed by Erich Eriksen and starring Colette Brettel, Ernst Winar and Ernst Pittschau.

The film's sets were designed by the art director Max Frick.

== Cast ==
- Colette Brettel
- Ernst Winar
- Ernst Pittschau
- Hans Conradi
- Karl Elzer
- Ernst Pröckl
- Else Wasa
