= The Salvation Army Girl =

1927 film directed by William Kahn

- Directed by: William Kahn
- Written by: Ludwig Hamburger; William Kahn
- Produced by: William Kahn
- Starring: Camilla von Hollay; Toni Ebärg; Ernst Rückert
- Cinematography: Josef Dietze
- Music by: Bruno Gellert
- Production company: William Kahn-Film
- Distributed by: Deutsche Vereins-Film
- Release date: 12 July 1927
- Country: Germany
- Languages: Silent; German intertitles

The Salvation Army Girl (German: Das Mädchen von der Heilsarmee) is a 1927 German silent film directed by William Kahn and starring Camilla von Hollay, Toni Ebärg and Ernst Rückert.

The film's art direction was by August Rinaldi.

== Cast ==
- Camilla von Hollay
- Toni Ebärg
- Ernst Rückert
- Valy Arnheim
- Siegfried Berisch
- Otto Kronburger
- Sylvia Torf

== Bibliography ==
- Grange, William. Cultural Chronicle of the Weimar Republic. Scarecrow Press, 2008.
