= Film Kathi =

1918 film

- Directed by: Franz Eckstein; Rosa Porten
- Written by: Rosa Porten
- Produced by: Viggo Larsen
- Starring: Reinhold Schünzel; Paul Rehkopf
- Cinematography: George Greenbaum
- Production company: Treumann-Larsen Film
- Distributed by: Treumann-Larsen Film
- Release date: 2 December 1918
- Country: Germany
- Languages: Silent; German intertitles

Film Kathi (German: Die Filmkathi) is a 1918 German silent comedy film directed by Franz Eckstein and Rosa Porten and starring Porten, Reinhold Schünzel and Paul Rehkopf.

== Cast ==
- Anna Hänseler
- Rosa Porten
- Paul Rehkopf
- Reinhold Schünzel
- Emil Sondermann
- Hella Tornegg
- Emmy Wyda

== Bibliography ==
- Bock, Hans-Michael & Bergfelder, Tim. The Concise CineGraph. Encyclopedia of German Cinema. Berghahn Books, 2009.
