= Maud Rockefeller's Bet =

1924 film

- Directed by: Erich Eriksen
- Written by: Franz Eckstein; Erich Eriksen
- Starring: Rita Clermont; Karl Elzer; Erich Kaiser-Titz
- Cinematography: Franz Stein
- Production company: National Film
- Release date: 1924
- Country: Germany
- Languages: Silent; German intertitles

Maud Rockefeller's Bet (German: Maud Rockfellers Wette) is a 1924 German silent comedy film directed by Erich Eriksen and starring Rita Clermont, Karl Elzer and Erich Kaiser-Titz.

== Cast ==
In alphabetical order

- Rita Clermont as Maud
- Karl Elzer as John Rockefeller
- Erich Kaiser-Titz as Mac Williams
- Vera Skidelsky as Alice
- Kurt Vespermann as Bill Wellwood

== Bibliography ==
- Grange, William. Cultural Chronicle of the Weimar Republic. Scarecrow Press, 2008.
