= Uwe Tellkamp =

German writer and physician (born 1968)

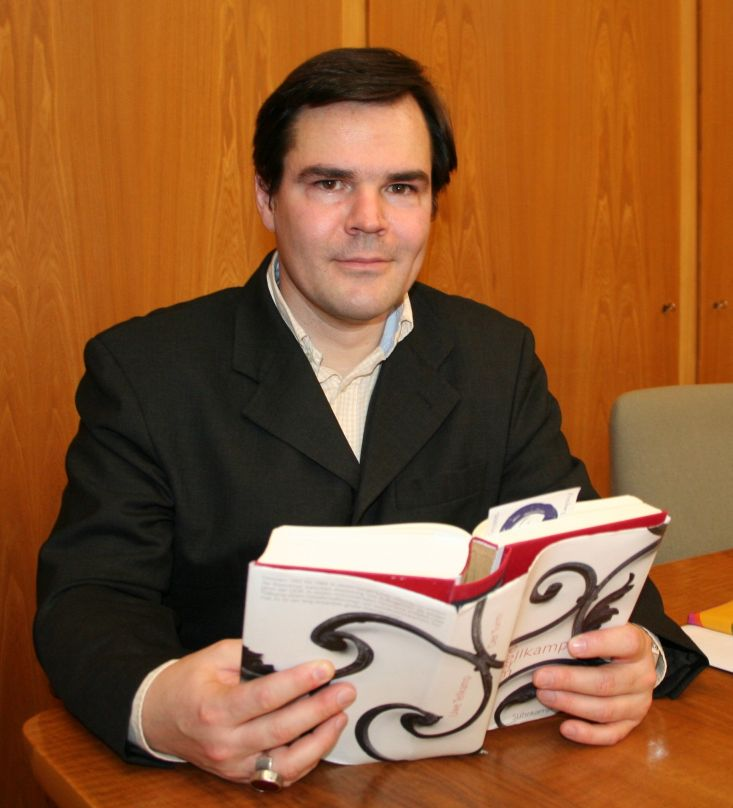
- Born: 28 October 1968 (age 58); Dresden, East Germany
- Occupations: Novelist, physician
- Writing career
- Notable work: Der Turm
- Notable awards: German Book Prize; 2008

Uwe Tellkamp (German pronunciation: [ˈuːvə ˈtɛlˌkamp]; born 28 October 1968) is a German writer and physician. He practised medicine until 2004. Before the fall of communism, he was enlisted in the National People's Army as a tank commander and imprisoned when he refused to break up a demonstration in October 1989. Until the fall of the German Democratic Republic shortly after, he was prohibited from studying medicine.

In 2008 Tellkamp was awarded the German Book Prize for his novel Der Turm (The Tower), which describes life in 1980s East Germany.

== Political views ==
In 2017 Tellkamp signed the "Charta 2017", criticizing the ostracism of 'New Right' publishers at the Leipzig book fair ("Leipziger Buchmesse").

=== Anti-immigration comments ===
Preceding the Leipziger Buchmesse 2018 Tellkamp said: "Most [refugees] are not trying to escape war and prosecution but come [to Germany] to migrate into the social support system, more than 95%."

In March 2018 he signed the "Joint Statement 2018" ("Gemeinsame Erklärung 2018"), declaring: "We observe the damage done to Germany by illegal mass immigration with growing disconcertment. We declare our solidarity with those who are peacefully rallying for the restoration of the constitutional order at the borders of our country."".

== Works ==
- Der Hecht, die Träume und das Portugiesische Café (2000)
- Der Eisvogel (2005)
- Der Turm (2008) UK translation: The Tower (2014)
- Reise zur Blauen Stadt (2009)
- Die Schwebebahn: Dresdner Erkundungen (2012)
