= Karl Elzer =

German actor

Karl Conrad Elzer (2 August 1881 – 30 August 1938) was a German film actor.

Elzer was born in Karlsruhe, Baden-Württemberg, Germany and died in Rottach-Egern, Bavaria, Germany at age 57.

== Selected filmography ==
- The Robber Bride (1916)
- The Blue Lantern (1918)
- Bummellotte (1922)
- Maud Rockefeller's Bet (1924)
- Set Me Free (1924)
- Lena Warnstetten (1925)
- The Proud Silence (1925)
- The Humble Man and the Chanteuse (1925)
- Young Blood (1926)
- The Trumpets are Blowing (1926)
- Excluded from the Public (1927)
- Queen Louise (1927)
- Venus in Evening Wear (1927)
- A Girl of the People (1927)
- Luther (1928)
- Morass (1928)
- The Page Boy at the Golden Lion (1928)
- Indizienbeweis (1929)
- Hungarian Nights (1929)
- The Hero of Every Girl's Dream (1929)
- Vendetta (1929)
- Queen of Fashion (1929)
- End of the Rainbow (1930)
- The Emperor's Sweetheart (1931)
- Miss Madame (1934)

== Bibliography ==
- Jung, Uli & Schatzberg, Walter. Beyond Caligari: The Films of Robert Wiene. Berghahn Books, 1999.
