= Morass (film) =

1922 film

- Directed by: Wolfgang Neff
- Written by: Jane Bess
- Produced by: Liddy Hegewald
- Starring: Maria Zelenka
- Cinematography: Marius Holdt; Hans Naundorf
- Production company: Hegewald Film
- Distributed by: Hegewald Film
- Release date: 18 February 1922
- Country: Germany
- Languages: Silent; German intertitles

Morass (German:Morast) is a 1922 German silent film directed by Wolfgang Neff and starring Maria Zelenka.

The film's sets were designed by the art director Mathieu Oostermann.

== Cast ==
- Maria Zelenka as Lissy
- Henri Peters-Arnolds
- Karl Elzer
- Bella Polini as Frau Tertiol
- Colette Corder as Meta
- Willy Kaiser-Heyl
- Julius Frucht as Dr. Herrmann
