= SS Cap Polonio =

German ocean liner operated by Hamburg Süd

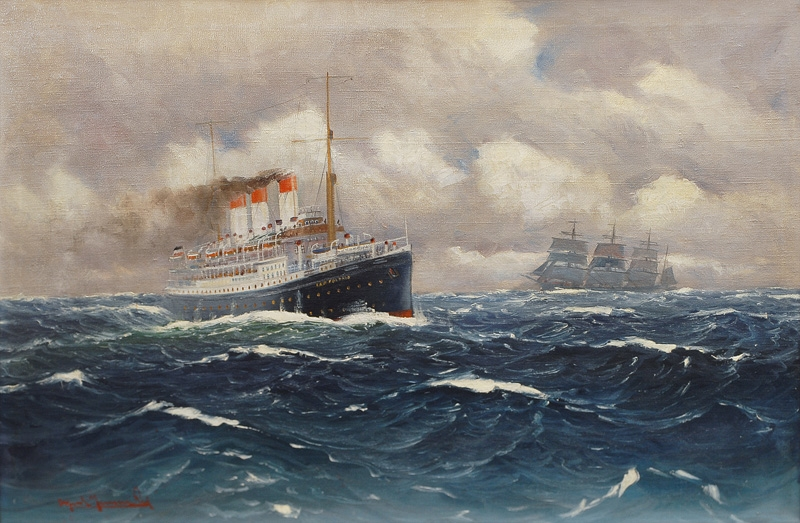
- "Cap Polonio on the high sea" painted by Alfred Jensen

History

Germany
- Name: Cap Polonio; SMS Vineta (1915)
- Namesake: Cabo Polonio; Vineta (1915)
- Owner: 1915–18: Hamburg Südamerikanische Dampfschifffahrts-Gesellschaft (HSDG); 1918–21: UK Government; 1921–35: HSDG
- Operator: 1915: Imperial German Navy; 1916–18: HSDG; 1918–21: Union-Castle Line, then P&O; 1921–35: HSDG
- Port of registry: Hamburg
- Route: Hamburg – Buenos Aires
- Ordered: 1912
- Builder: Blohm+Voss, Hamburg
- Yard number: 221
- Laid down: 1913
- Launched: 25 March 1914
- Commissioned: 1915
- In service: 1915
- Out of service: 1931
- Home port: Hamburg
- Identification: As Vineta: call sign AVN; Until 1933: code letters RBLM; From 1934: call sign DHDN
- Fate: Scrapped 1935

General characteristics
- Type: ocean liner, 1915: auxiliary cruiser
- Tonnage: 20,517 GRT; tonnage under deck 13,886; 9,607 NRT
- Displacement: 24,500 tons
- Length: 194.4 m (637.8 ft) (registered length)
- Beam: 22.1 m (72.4 ft)
- Draught: 8.4 m (28 ft)
- Depth: 10.5 m (34.4 ft)
- Decks: 3
- Propulsion: 2 × 4-cylinder triple-expansion engines; 1 × steam turbine; 3 × screws
- Speed: 17 knots (31 km/h)
- Range: 7,000 nautical miles at 15 knots (28 km/h)
- Endurance: 19 days
- Boats & landing craft carried: 20 in 1914, increased to 28 in 1915
- Capacity: 1,555 passengers: 1st class 355; 2nd class 250; 3rd class 950; 395 m^{3} (13,949 cu ft) refrigerated cargo
- Sensors & processing systems: submarine signalling (by 1930); wireless direction finding (by 1930); gyrocompass (by 1934)
- Armament: (as auxiliary cruiser); 4 × 150 mm (5.9 in) guns; 4 × 88 mm (3.5 in) quick-firing guns

SS Cap Polonio was a German 20,576 GRT ocean liner that was launched in 1914 and scrapped in 1935. She worked the Hamburg Südamerikanische Dampfschifffahrtsgesellschaft ("Hamburg South America Steamship Company") route between Hamburg in Germany and Buenos Aires in Argentina. She was named after Cabo Polonio in Uruguay.

In the First World War Cap Polonio was briefly commissioned as the auxiliary cruiser SMS Vineta. As such she was unsuccessful, did not see active service and was returned to her owners.

== Building ==
Blohm+Voss in Hamburg built Cap Polonio, laying her keel in 1913 and launching her on 25 March 1914. Hamburg Süd had ordered her as a running mate for Cap Trafalgar, which had been launched in 1913 and entered service in April 1914. Cap Polonio shared the same beam as Cap Trafalgar, but was significantly longer. Cap Polonio's registered length was 194.4 m (637.8 ft), whereas Cap Trafalgar's was 180.0 m (590.4 ft).

Cap Polonio had the same propulsion system as Cap Trafalgar, with three screws and what was called "combination machinery". Her port and starboard screws were each driven by a four-cylinder triple-expansion steam engine. Exhaust steam from the low-pressure cylinder of each of these engines drove a low-pressure steam turbine that drove her middle screw.

The combination of three screws, two piston engines and one low-pressure turbine had been pioneered in the UK on the cargo liner Otaki and transatlantic liner Laurentic, both launched in 1908. It had since been applied to the giant Olympic-class ocean liners and several other passenger liners. It offered better fuel economy and speed than propulsion purely by piston engines, and more flexibility than pure turbine propulsion.

Cap Polonio's holds included 395 cubic metres (13,949 cu ft) of refrigerated space for perishable cargo.

When the First World War began at the end of July 1914 Cap Polonio was not yet complete. With the prior agreement of the owners, the Imperial German Navy requisitioned her for conversion to an auxiliary cruiser. She was completed and armed with four 150-millimetre (5.9 in) and four 88-millimetre (3.5 in) quick-firing guns. She was designed with three funnels but the third one aft was a dummy. For war service the Imperial Navy had the dummy funnel removed.

In February 1915 this work was completed and on 6 February 1915 she was commissioned as SMS Vineta, named after a mythical city of that name on the south coast of the Baltic Sea. Her naval wireless telegraph call sign was AVN.

== First World War ==
Vineta's sea trials were unsatisfactory. Although the combination of piston engines and a turbine had achieved unrivalled fuel economy and good speeds in several UK-built liners, Vineta failed to reach her designed top speed of 17 knots (31 km/h), and her coal consumption was a prodigious 250 tons per day. This gave her a maximum endurance at sea of less than three weeks. Also by this time the first phase of the war on commerce was over. Given her shortcomings the Imperial Navy decommissioned Vineta and returned her to her owners.

Restored to her civilian name Cap Polonio, she remained at Hamburg, trapped by the Allied blockade of Germany.

== Failure with British operators ==
After the 1918 Armistice the United States seized her as war reparations. But she was then transferred to the UK Shipping Controller in London, who placed her under Union-Castle Line management. She sailed to England, was painted in Union-Castle colours and embarked passengers and homeward-bound South African soldiers for a voyage to Cape Town and Durban.

Cap Polonio sailed from Plymouth in Devon on 21 June 1919. Despite being bunkered with good British steam coal she made only 12 knots (22 km/h). Worse, she suffered a series of mechanical failures. She did not reach Cape Town until 18 July and the Durban leg of her voyage was cancelled. On return to Plymouth the ship remained for a time in Devonport Dockyard.

Next the ship came under P&O management, who sailed her to Bombay in India. On this voyage she achieved only 10 knots (19 km/h) and again suffered significant mechanical problems. P&O too gave up on her, and she spent a time out of service in Liverpool.

== Success with Hamburg Süd ==
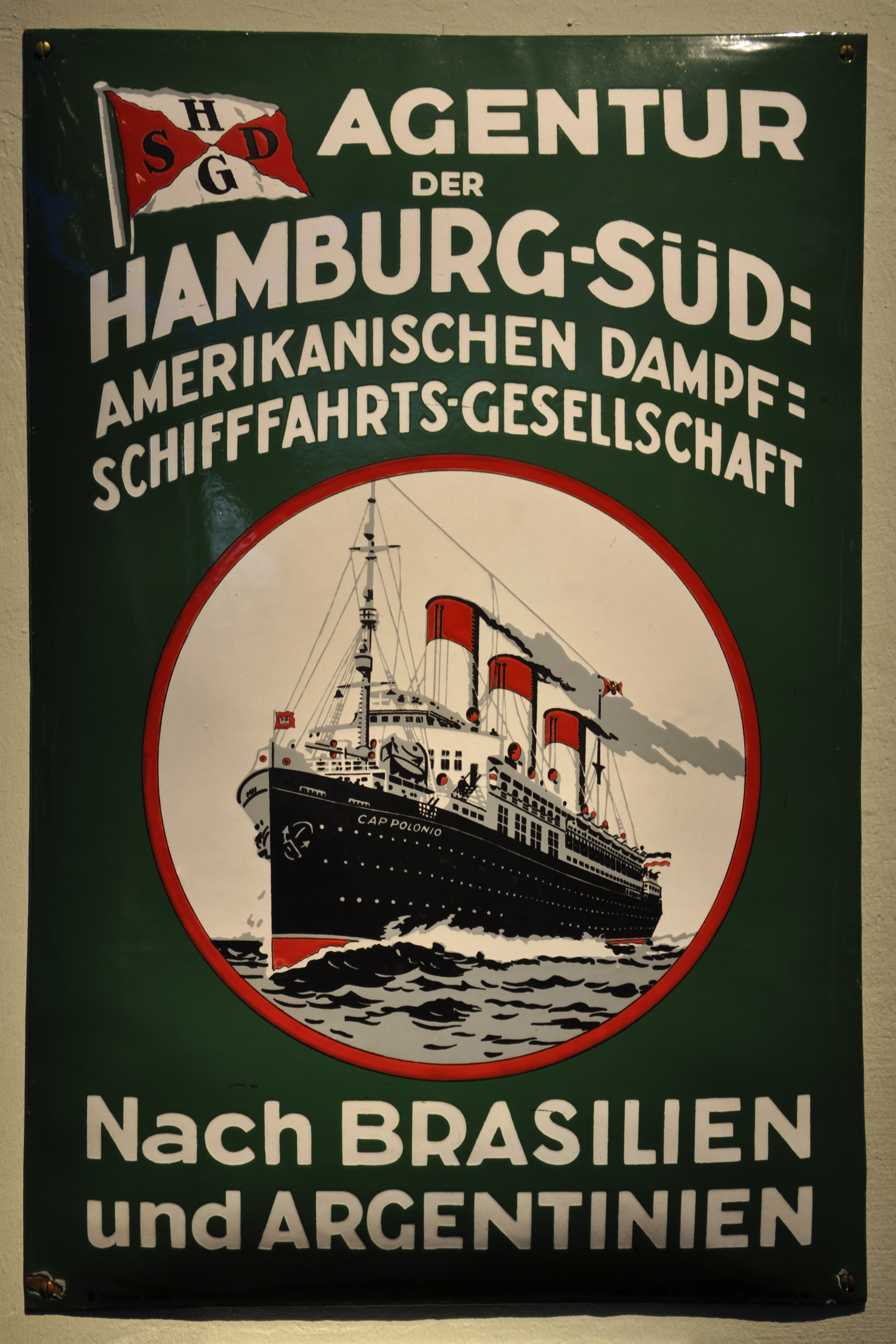
A Hamburg Süd poster featuring Cap Polonio

Finally in 1921 Cap Polonio's original owners, Hamburg Süd, bought her back for $150,000. In February 1922 she finally began the Hamburg – Buenos Aires service for which she had been built eight years earlier. And she at last achieved the 18-to-19-knot (33 to 35 km/h) speeds for which she was designed.

In 1927 Blohm+Voss completed a new flagship for the Hamburg Süd fleet. At 27,561 GRT and with a 20-knot (37 km/h) top speed, the new Cap Arcona was significantly larger and slightly quicker than Cap Polonio. The older ship remained in regular service until 1931, when Hamburg Süd laid her up.

In 1934 Cap Polonio's code letters RBLM were superseded by the call sign DHDN.

In June 1935 Cap Polonio sailed to Bremerhaven, where she was scrapped. However, parts of the ship's luxurious interior were salvaged and taken to Pinneberg in Holstein, where they were used to create the Hotel Cap Polonio. The hotel survived the Second World War and is still in business today.

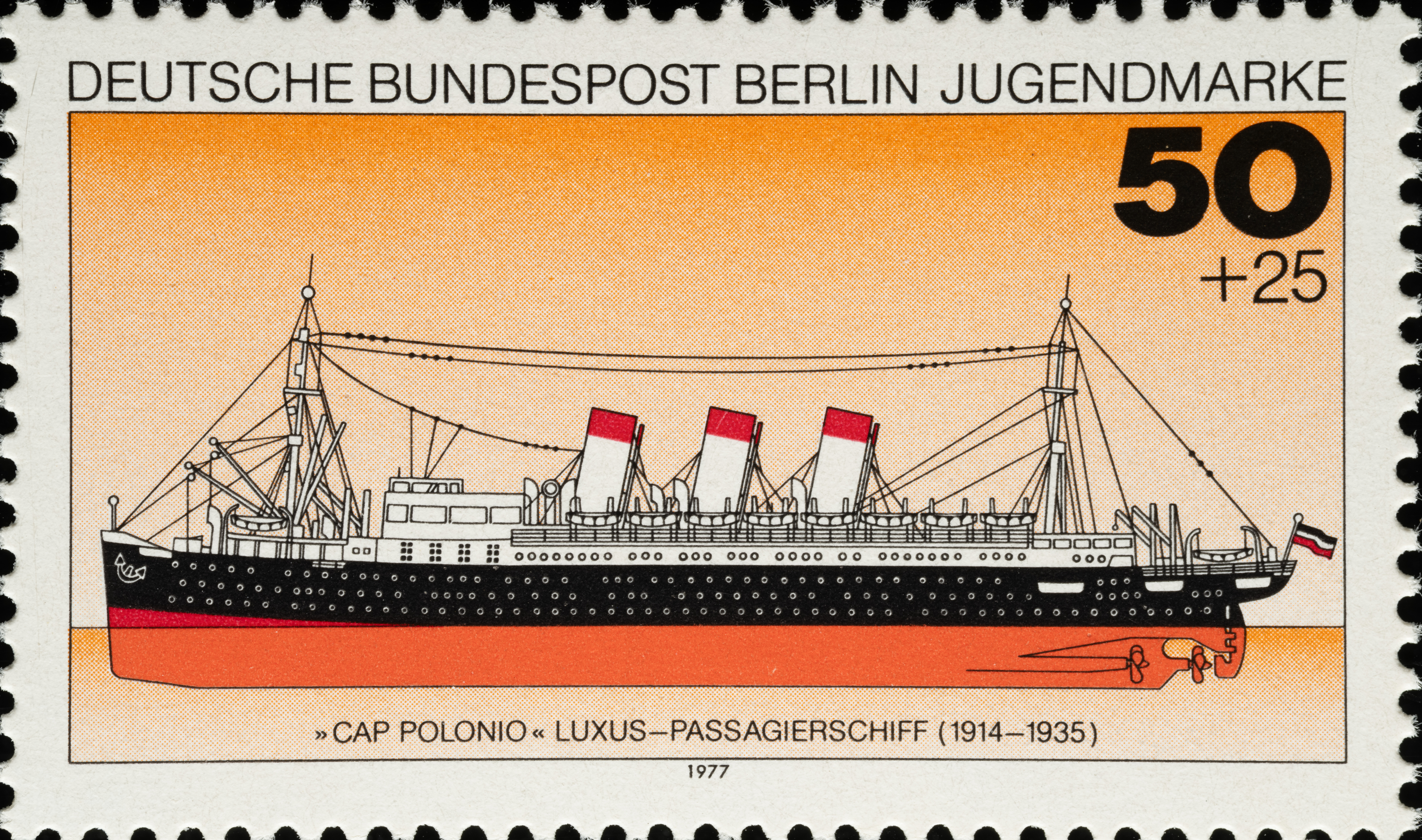
SS Cap Polonio stamp issued by Deutsche Bundespost Berlin, 14th of April 1977

On 14th of April 1977 Deutsche Bundespost Berlin issued a set of pictorial commemorative stamps of German merchant ships. The 50+25 pfennig stamp in the set featured a picture of Cap Polonio.

== Sources ==
- Hawkins, Nigel (2002). The Starvation Blockades. Barnsley: Pen and Sword Books. ISBN 0-85052-908-5.
- The Marconi Press Agency Ltd (1918). The Year Book of Wireless Telegraphy and Telephony. London: The Wireless Press, Ltd.
- Schmalenbach, Paul (1980) [1977]. German Raiders: The Story of the German Navy's Auxiliary Cruisers, 1895-1945. Cambridge: Patrick Stephens Ltd. ISBN 0-85059-351-4.
