= Werner Funck =

German actor, singer and film director (1881–1951)

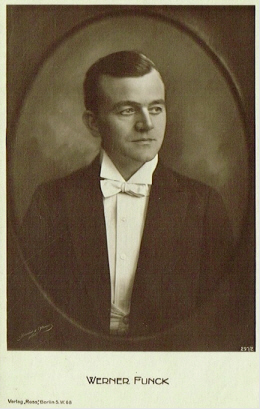
- Funck c. 1920
- Born: 4 February 1881; Königsberg, German Empire
- Died: 6 October 1951 (aged 70); Potsdam, East Germany
- Occupations: Actor, director, singer
- Years active: 1901-1939

Werner Funck (4 February 1881 – 6 October 1951) was a German stage and film actor, singer and film director.

== Selected filmography ==
Actor

- The Heiress of the Count of Monte Cristo (1919)
- The Girl from Acker Street (1920)
- Impostor (1921)
- You Are the Life (1921)
- Lotte Lore (1921)
- Your Brother's Wife (1921)
- The Black Star (1922)
- Your Bad Reputation (1922)
- Hallig Hooge (1923)
- Battle of the Butterflies (1924)
- Op Hoop van Zegen (1924)
- When Women Keep Silent (1937)
- The Muzzle (1938)
- Northern Lights (1938)
- Robert Koch (1939)
- Twelve Minutes After Midnight (1939)

Director

- Impostor (1921)
- Vineta, the Sunken City (1923)
- The Hungarian Princess (1923)
- The Four Marriages of Matthias Merenus (1924)

== Bibliography ==
- Grange, William. Cultural Chronicle of the Weimar Republic. Scarecrow Press, 2008.
