= Michael Heck =

US Air Force officer (born 1942)

- Born: July 12, 1942 (age 83)
- Allegiance: United States
- Branch: United States Air Force
- Service years: 1966-1972
- Rank: Captain
- Conflicts: Vietnam War
- Awards: Distinguished Flying Cross; 2 Presidential Unit Citations

Captain Michael John Heck (born July 12, 1942) was an American B-52 Stratofortress pilot in the Vietnam War best known for becoming a conscientious objector and refusing to continue flying bombing missions over North Vietnamese targets in late 1972. Heck attended Whittier College, which is also then-President of the United States Richard Nixon's alma mater. Though there were four other American pilots before Heck who had refused to fly combat missions over Indochina during the buildup to the war, Heck's case was the first to come to public attention and highlighted the moral issues of the raids.

== Decision and reaction ==
During Operation Linebacker II (commonly called the Christmas bombings), Heck began to question the morality of the missions. Aged 30, he had already flown 175 B-52 bombing runs and about 100 combat missions in C-121s, earned a Distinguished Flying Cross and two Presidential Unit Citations. His doubts continued to grow as the bombing escalated, and on December 26 Heck told his wing commander that he could no longer participate in the campaign. Heck flew his last mission two days earlier over the heavily defended Hanoi-Haiphong region, and had only one more year to serve before his scheduled discharge.

In order to explain Heck's decision, a few Pentagon staffers suggested that he might be suffering from combat fatigue. A senior United States Air Force officer implied that Heck was too scared to continue to fly over North Vietnam in light of the heavy losses of B-52s. But Heck said that fear had nothing to do with his decision:

If they tell me now to go on milk runs, the B-52 targets over South Vietnam where nobody gets shot at, I would feel no different. I would even refuse a ground job of supervising the loading of bombs or refueling aircraft. I can't be a participant. The goals do not justify the mass destruction and killing.

Heck's parents were not surprised by their son's decision, as they saw evidence of his feelings in his letters since he returned for his third B-52 tour in September 1972. Heck's father described the Christmas bombing campaign as "the last straw that triggered [Michael's decision]." In a television interview, Heck's parents told reporters that he never wanted to go to war, but Heck admitted he still would not mind flying cargo planes.

== Aftermath ==
Heck was reassigned to administrative duties immediately following his decision. Instead of resigning, he sought non-combat status as a conscientious objector. When it became clear that the Air Force would not grant non-combat status, Heck issued his resignation.

Heck's request for an honorable discharge was denied, and an investigating officer recommended that he be court-martialed. Heck was represented by the American Civil Liberties Union and filed a second resignation under other than honorable terms, which was accepted on February 8, 1973. The discharge Heck received was the lowest grade that can be given to an officer without a court-martial. His distinguished career with the Air Force helped him avoid a court-martial.

After arriving back in the United States, Heck held a news conference where he stated:

I'm more sure than ever now about what I did. I should have done it earlier.
