= Ruden (island) =

German island in the Baltic Sea

Coordinates: 54°12′N 13°46′E

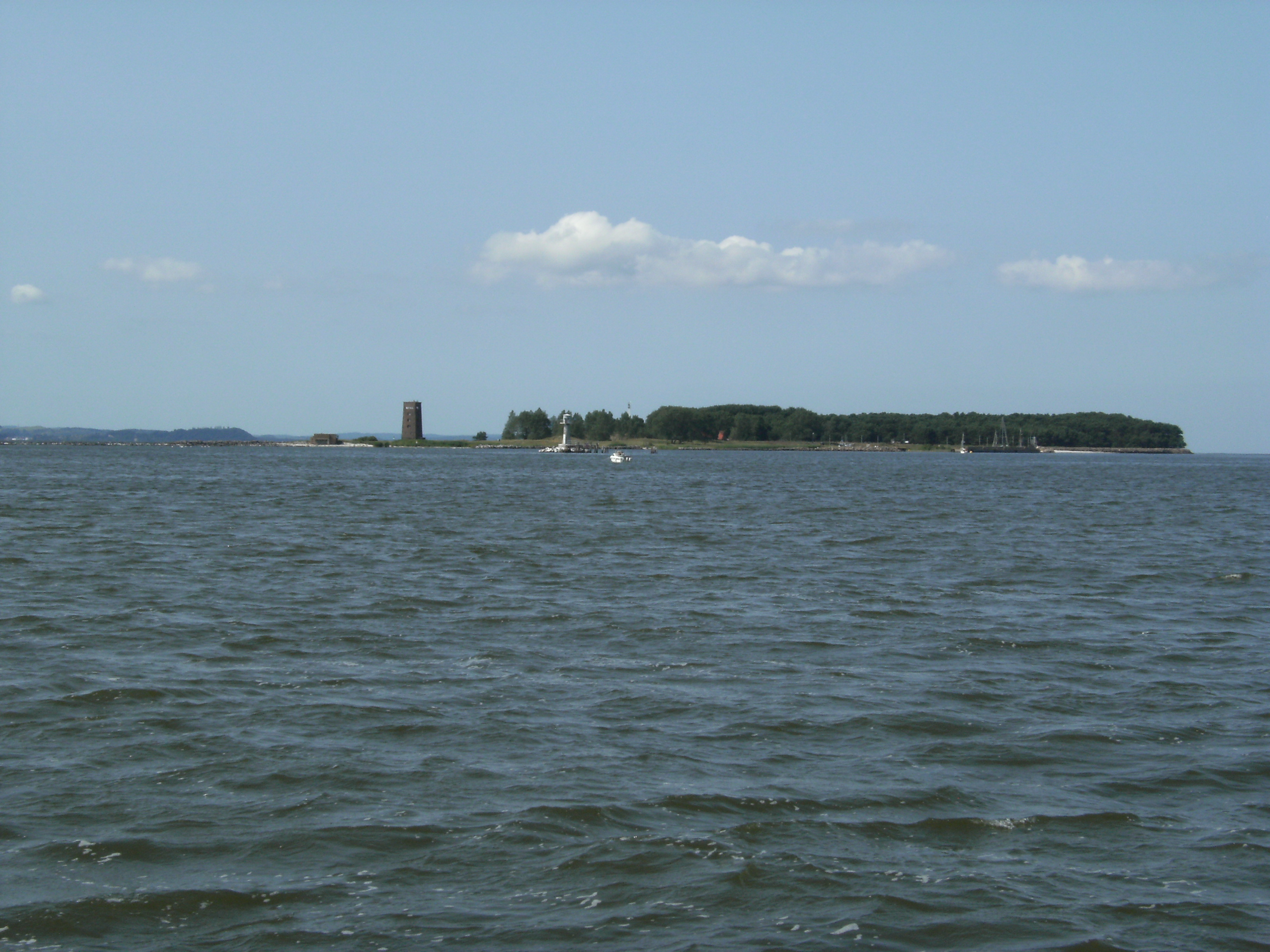
Ruden Island from the southeast

Ruden (German pronunciation: [ˈʁuːdn̩]) is a small island in the Baltic Sea, between Rügen and Usedom off the German coast. Ruden belongs to the municipality of Kröslin, in the German state (Bundesland) of Mecklenburg-Western Pomerania. Before the storm tide of All Saints Day in 1304, Ruden was probably part of a land bridge between Usedom and Rügen.

Today, the Ruden is a nature reserve. On the island there is a private mating station where colonies of Buckfast bees are kept and used for breeding, since the adverse environmental conditions and the distance to the nearest mainland mean that the population cannot mix with other bee colonies.
