= Ernst Pittschau =

German actor (1883–1951)

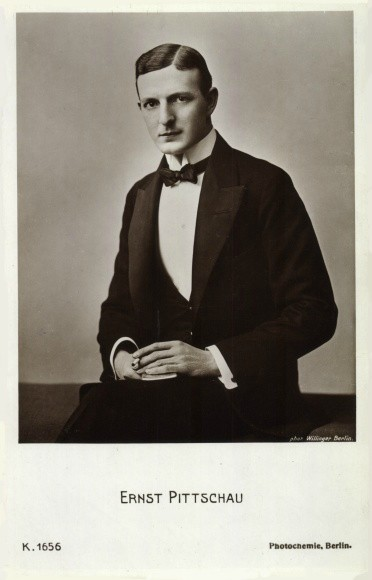
- Pittschau, c. 1915
- Born: 5 October 1883; Altona, Hamburg, German Empire
- Died: 2 June 1951 (aged 67); West Berlin, West Germany
- Occupation: Actor
- Years active: 1905–1948
- Relatives: Werner Pittschau (half-brother)

Ernst Pittschau (5 October 1883 – 2 June 1951) was a German stage and film actor.

== Biography ==
Pittschau, whose father's name was also named Ernst Pittschau, a stage actor, received an education in business and had a brief career selling dental products. However, he then chose his father's profession and had his first theatrical engagement at the end of 1905 in Koblenz.

In 1910, he appeared in New York City, and in 1911, he was a stage actor in Berlin. A year later, he took roles in the still undervalued cinema. Pittschau personified elegant lovers and was a partner of Hanni Weisse and Henny Porten, among others.

In the 20s, his film roles became smaller; after that, he barely received work. He now mostly played at the Theater am Kurfürstendamm, at the Komödie and at the Tribüne. In the 1940s, he lived in poverty and had to rely on the support of the Goebbels-supported foundation for people who worked in the arts, "Künstlerdank."

After World War II, the Italian director Roberto Rossellini brought the almost forgotten actor in front of the camera again. In the survival drama Germany, Year Zero (1948), he played the bedridden father.

His half-brother was the stage and film actor Werner Pittschau (1902-1928) who died in a car crash.

== Selected filmography ==
- Zofia - Kriegs-Irrfahrten eines Kindes (1915)
- Schlemihl (1915) - Bodo
- Die Schaffnerin der Linie 6 (1915)
- Die silberne Kugel (1916) - Mitglied des Gaunerquartetts
- Der Fall Klerk (1916) - Direktor Hansen
- Hoffmanns Erzählungen (1916)
- The Grehn Case (1916) - Professor Herkdal
- Wer wirft den ersten Stein auf sie? (1916)
- Gaugräfin Fifi (1916)
- Vengeance Is Mine (1916)
- Lux, der Spürhund von Stradford (1916)
- Das Geheimnis der Diamantenfelder (1916)
- Der Fall Routt...! (1917) - Astronom Brown
- Aus Liebe gefehlt (1917)
- Des Goldes Fluch (1917) - Zuchthäusler Phil. Graf
- The Picture of Dorian Gray (1917) - Herzog Henry Wotton
- Königliche Bettler (1917)
- Die verschlossene Tür (1917) - Hetford
- Seltsame Menschen (1917)
- Lumpengrete (1917)
- Durchlaucht amüsiert sich (1917)
- Das Verhängnis einer Nacht (1917)
- Robin Morris (1918) - James Walker
- Der Weg ins Freie (1918)
- Let There Be Light (1918, part 2, 3)
- Das Kainzeichen (1918) - Jacob Jensen
- Die seltsame Geschichte des Baron Torelli (1918) - Baron Pansa
- Mr. Wu (1918) - Lord Chiltren
- Pique Dame (1918) - Narumoff
- Die Singende Hand (1918) - Gonzaga
- Die Heimatlosen (1918) - Oswald Harro
- Der Volontär (1918)
- Des Vaters Schuld (1918)
- Die tolle Heirat von Laló (1918)
- Die Tänzerin Adina (1918) - von Stoll
- The Story of Dida Ibsen (1918) - Eken Kornils
- Zwischen Tod und Leben (1919) - Franz
- Treu der Jugend (1919) - Assessor Horst
- Different from the Others (1919) - Brother-in-Law
- Stiefkinder des Glücks (1919) - Erwin von Eben
- The Lady in the Car (1919) - Jens Lofthus - Mankier
- Verschleppt (1919) - Cyrus Golden
- Gepeitscht (1919)
- Zwischen neun und neun (1919) - Karl Marwitz
- The Devil and the Madonna (1919) - Graf Jervis
- Verlorene Töchter (1919) - Gärtner Franz
- Sein letzter Trick (1919) - Sportsmann
- Fieber (1919)
- Die Toten kehren wieder - Enoch Arden (1919) - Fred Carlston
- Die Törichte Jungfrau (1919)
- Die Ehe aus Haß (1919) - Staatsanwalt Hansen
- Der Terministenklub (1919) - Felix Leander
- Der Saal der sieben Sünden (1919) - Redfern
- Der Kampf um die Ehe (1919, part 1, 2) - Detektiv
- Der Harlekin (1919) - Fabrikant Rolf Ringstett
- Der Fall Tolstikoff (1919) - Kapellmeister Büttner
- Das Schicksal der Maria Keith (1919) - Bernhard von Gellwitz, ihr Sohn
- Der Doppelmord von Sarajewo (1920) - Graf Harrach
- Getäuscht (1920) - Kurt von Sassen
- Können Gedanken töten? (1920)
- Um der Liebe Willen (1920)
- Wenn Colombine winkt (1920)
- The Rose of Stamboul (1920) - Baron Rangen
- The Woman in the Dolphin (1920) - Harold Holm
- Schatten einer Stunde (1920)
- Der Meisterschuß (1920)
- Dämmernde Nächte (1920) - Baron von Bonais
- Unter der Dornenkrone - Mexikos Kaisertragödie (1921) - Oberst Lopez
- Opfer der Liebe (1921)
- Der Mann im Schrank (1921)
- Schuld oder Schein (1921)
- You Are the Life (1921)
- Das Geheimnis der Santa Margherita (1921)
- Cocain (1921)
- Im Kampf mit dem unsichtbaren Feind (1922) - Herr aus dem Sanatorium
- The Five Frankfurters (1922) - Wellington
- Lucrezia Borgia (1922) - Manfredo
- Lola Montez, the King's Dancer (1922) - Studiosus Peisner
- Circus People (1922)
- Die Heimatlosen (1923)
- The Second Shot (1923)
- Die Radio Heirat (1924)
- Ash Wednesday (1925)
- Reveille: The Great Awakening (1925)
- Nameless Heroes (1925, Short)
- The Adventures of Captain Hasswell (1925) - von Berkhof
- Lena Warnstetten (1925)
- The Proud Silence (1925)
- Watch on the Rhine (1926)
- Ich hatt' einen Kameraden (1926)
- The Beaver Coat (1928)
- Trust of Thieves (1929) - Member of the Supervisory Board
- Rag Ball (1930)
- Der Liebesarzt (1931)
- A Waltz by Strauss (1931) - Der Bräutigam
- Victoria and Her Hussar (1931) - Sekretär
- Die Zaubergeige (1944)
- Junge Adler (1944)
- Die Degenhardts (1944)
- Die Affäre Rödern (1944)
- Philharmoniker (1944)
- Germany, Year Zero (1948) - Il padre (final film role)

== Bibliography ==
- Bondanella, Peter E. The Films of Roberto Rossellini. Cambridge University Press, 1993.
- Gottlieb, Sidney. Roberto Rossellini's Rome Open City. Cambridge University Press, 2004.
