= Rosa Porten =

German screenwriter

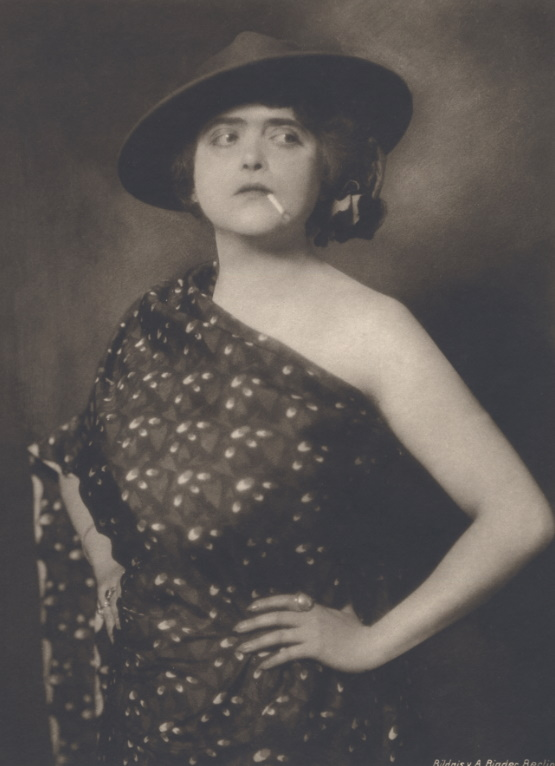
- Rosa Porten, ca. 1916
- Born: 18 February 1884; Düsseldorf, German Empire
- Died: 7 May 1972 (aged 88); Munich, West Germany
- Other name: Dr. R. Portegg
- Occupations: Screenwriter; Actor; Director
- Years active: 1906–1928
- Era: Silent film
- Spouse: Franz Eckstein
- Parent(s): Franz Porten; Wincenzia Porten
- Relatives: Henny Porten (sister); Fritz Porten (brother)

Rosa Porten (18 February 1884 – 7 May 1972) was a prolific German screenwriter, actress, and director during the silent film era.

== Early life ==
Porten was born in Düsseldorf, Germany, the daughter of Franz Porten and Wincenzia Porten (née Wybiral). She had a younger sister, Henny Porten, and a younger brother, Fritz Porten. Her father was an opera singer and her sister was a popular film star in Germany.

== Career ==
As a child, Porten and her sister would often appear in school plays and moving picture image collections featuring opera and arias that their father shot.

As a director, Porten's films were notable for featuring storylines centered on women.

== Personal life ==
Porten was married to director Franz Eckstein. She died in 1972 in Munich, West Germany.

== Filmography ==
The following is a selected list of works by Porten. Film archivists suspect that Porten worked on over 50 films, but most have not survived due to the flammable nature of the films of that period. Her films have been featured in film festivals like The Fifth International Women and the Silent Screen Conference, Stockholm University, Sweden in June 2008, Il Cinema Ritrovato and UNESCO’s World Day for Audiovisual Heritage in 2010 and 2014.

=== Screenwriter ===
- 1928: Die Heiratsfalle - writer, director
- 1927: The Girl from Abroad - writer
- 1927: Fahrendes Volk (documentary short) - writer
- 1925: Hedda Gabler (screenplay) - writer
- 1924: Die Schmetterlingsschlacht - writer
- 1922: Your Bad Reputation - writer, actor
- 1921: Your Brother's Wife - writer
- 1921: Die Hexe - writer
- 1921: Die Rächer - writer
- 1921: Lotte Lore - writer
- 1921: Was tat ich dir? - writer
- 1921: You Are the Life - writer
- 1921: Durch Liebe erlöst - writer
- 1921: Opfer der Liebe - writer
- 1920: Badebubi - writer
- 1920: Das Drama von Glossow - writer
- 1920: Auri Sacra Fames, 2. Teil - Das Testament eines Exzentrischen - writer, actor
- 1920: Auri Sacra Fames, 1. Teil - An der Liebe Narrenseil - writer, actor
- 1920: Themis - writer, actor
- 1919: Die da sterben, wenn sie lieben - writer
- 1918: Die Augen der Schwester - writer, actor
- 1918: Ihr Junge - writer, actor
- 1918: Film Kathi - writer, director, actor
- 1918: Der Trompeter von Säckingen - writer
- 1917: Die nicht lieben dürfen... - writer, director, actor
- 1917: Ihr laßt den Armen schuldig werden - writer, actor
- 1917: The Coquette - writer, director, actor
- 1917: The Newest Star of Variety - writer, director, actor
- 1917: Gräfin Maruschka - writer, director, actor
- 1916: Die Wäscher-Resl - writer, director, actor
- 1916: Das große Schweigen - writer
- 1915: Abgründe - writer
- 1911: Das Liebesglück der Blinden = The Happy Love of a Blind Girl (short) - writer

=== Actor ===
- 1921: Die Rächer - actor
- 1910: Das Geheimnis der Toten (short) - actor
- 1910: Wem gehört das Kind? = Who owns the child? (short) - actor
  - In 2014, Fondazione Cineteca di Bologna restored this nitrate film that was in the holdings of the Deutsche Kinemathek
- 1909: Der Brief an den lieben Gott (short) - actor
- 1909: Die kleine Baroness (short) - actor
- 1909: Othello (short) - actor, as Emilia
- 1908: Funiculi Funicula (short) - actor
- 1906: Apachentanz (short) - actor
- 1906: Meißner Porzellan (short) - actor, as Dame

=== Director ===
As a director, Porten often co-directed with her husband, Franz Eckstein; in these instances she used the pseudonym, Dr. R. Portegg.

- 1920: Die List Einer Zigarettenmacherin = Wanda's Trick - director (as R. Portegg)
- 1918: Not of the Woman Born - director
- 1918: Der Dieb - director (as R. Portegg)
- 1917: Das Opfer der Yella Rogesius = The Victim of the Yella Rogesius - director (as R. Portegg)
- 1917: Das Teufelchen = The Devil - director (as Dr. R. Portegg)
  - In 2013, Österreichisches Filmmuseum = Austrian Film Museum restored this nitrate film, with the photochemical preservation process completed by Svenska Filminstitutet. Original had special tinting which was recreated via the Desmet method
- 1917: Die Landpomeranze = The Unwieldy Country Woman - director (as Dr. R. Portegg)

== Works and publications ==
- Porten, Rosa. Die Filmprinzeß: Roman aus der Kino-Welt. = The Film Princess. Berlin: Eysler, 1919. OCLC 711795572
