= All Saints' Flood (1304) =

The All Saints Day flood (German: Allerheiligenflut) of 1304 was a storm surge that hit the southwestern Baltic Sea coast on 1 November (All Saints' Day) that year. The region of Western Pomerania was particularly badly affected by the flooding. 271 people died as a result of the flood. The dating of the disaster to All Saints' Day in 1304, which gave the flood its name, goes back to the Stralsundische Chronik by Johann Berckmann (died 1560). This date is, however, not confirmed, although it is probable that the year was 1304.

== Course of events ==
Like most similar storm floods, the All Saints Day flood arose when water accumulated in the middle and northern Baltic as a result of several days of strong westerly winds, and then surged abruptly onto the Pomeranian coast when the wind suddenly shifted to the northeast. Chronicles report a severe storm, which destroyed numerous houses and churches.

== Consequences ==
To the east of Rügen is the Mönchgut Peninsula, 8 km southeast of which is the island of Ruden, is the Greifswald Bodden threshold, which separates the Greifswald Bodden from the Baltic Sea. Some chronicles claim that there was a land connection here, which was destroyed by the All Saints Day flood, so that a new channel, 3 to 4 metres deep, was formed through the so-called Greifswald Bodden threshold and described as a new shipping lane or significant opening.

The All Saints Day flood resulted in substantial losses of land between the islands of Rügen and Usedom: for example, until 1304 there was a land bridge between the peninsula of Mönchgut on Rügen and the island of Ruden off Usedom. The Bay of Greifswald was probably still an inland lake and the present-day branch of the River Oder, the Peenestrom, flowed on through the Strelasund and did not discharge into the Baltic until the western end of the sound. In the 1304 storm flood, the southern part of the Mönchgut and most of Ruden was flooded. Whether further storm flooding was needed to finally drown the land under the water, is not known. The only losses recorded are those of two villages on Ruden that were drowned. The Bay of Greifswald was henceforth known as the "low country" (Landtief) or the "New Deep" (Neue Tief). 300 years later, only the ever-shrinking island of Ruden remained, along with the small island of North Ruden, which presumably sank beneath the waves in the 17th century. The remaining island is still less than 2 metres above the water for long stretches; the channel for the eastern approach to Stralsund has to be dredged to be kept free.

Other consequences of the All Saints Day flood have not been handed down, but it is also possible that it led to breaches to the Baltic Sea at Damerow on Usedom, at the Swine estuary and on the shores of the Prorer Wiek. These areas were almost uninhabited at the end of Middle Ages because of their infertility.

Due to questionable and partly contradictory traditions, the scientific literature does not agree on the facts. However, taking into account geomorphological coastal changes in recent earth history, from c. 2000 B.C. until the Middle Ages, and the location of the Mönchgraben, a border fortification, there was almost certainly a land bridge.

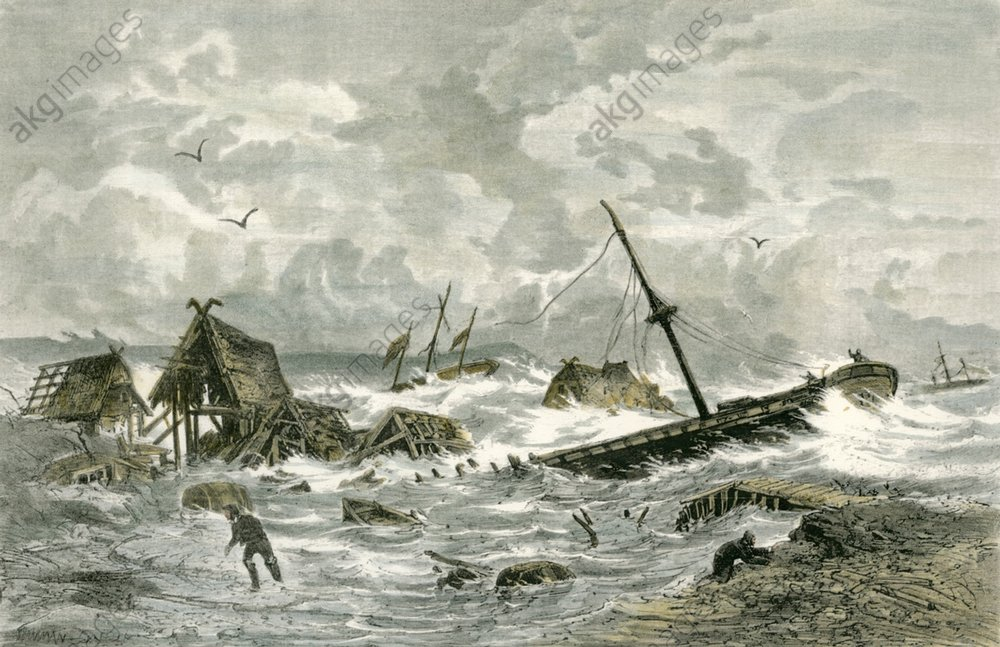
The Storm Flood on the Baltic Coast: The Holstein Village of Hafkrug on the Bay of Neutstadt During the Storm Flood. 1872 woodcut of a drawing by Karl Heynnach from a sketch by Karl Rettich.

== Chronicles ==
The oldest known written account of the flood is recorded in two Stralsund Chronicles from the late 15th century that were published by Rudolf Baier in 1893. Chronicles by Johannes Bugenhagen, Johannes Berckmann, Thomas Kantzow and Nicolaus von Klemptzen all reported the event.

In many chronicles the descriptions of the effects of the flood are mostly exaggerated and untrue. For example, Albert Georg Schwartz, wanted to establish the loss of land on Ruden and reported the demise of two villages on the island in a document by Gottlieb Samuel Pristaff, which was revealed as a forgery after 1850. The data invented by him were disseminated by various authors and were found primarily in local literature.

== Literature ==
- Friedrich-Wilhelm Dwars: Der angebliche Landzusammenhang zwischen Rügen und dem Ruden in historischer Zeit und die Entstehung der Einfahrten am Ostrand des Greifswalder Boddens. In: Gesellschaft für pommersche Geschichte und Altertumskunde (ed.): Baltische Studien. New Series, Vol. 45, von der Ropp, Hamburg 1958, pp. 9–26(urn:nbn:de:gbv:9-g-283795)
