= Maria Zelenka =

Austrian film actress

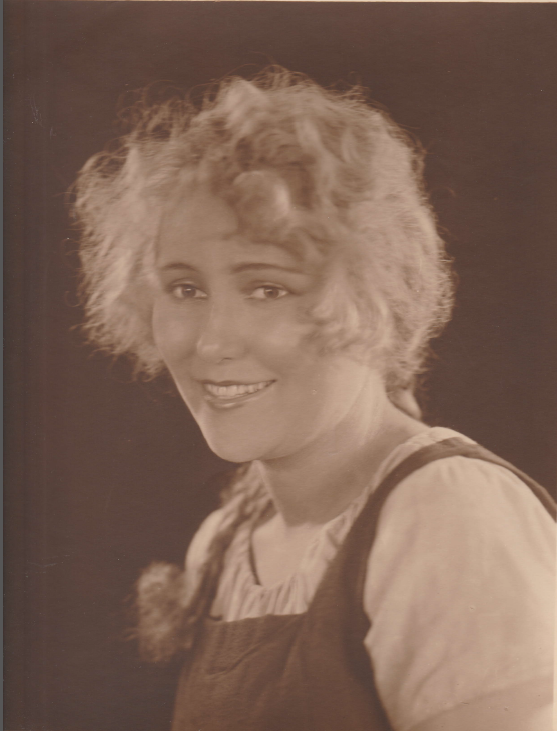
- Zelenka circa 1915
- Born: 28 June 1894; Vienna, Austro-Hungarian Empire
- Died: 30 August 1975 (aged 81); Vienna, Austria
- Occupation: Actress
- Years active: 1918–1932 (film)

Maria Zelenka (1894–1975) was an Austrian film actress.

== Selected filmography ==
- Alkohol (1919)
- Lola Montez (1919)
- The Grand Babylon Hotel (1920)
- The Blood of the Ancestors (1920)
- Alfred von Ingelheim's Dramatic Life (1921)
- Love and Passion (1921)
- Bummellotte (1922)
- Morass (1922)
- The Girl of the Golden West (1922)
- The Doomed (1924)
- The Adventures of Captain Hasswell (1925)
- The Ascent of Little Lilian (1925)
- Oh Those Glorious Old Student Days (1925)
- Women and Banknotes (1926)
- Watch on the Rhine (1926)
- Children's Tragedy (1928)

== Bibliography ==
- Grange, William. Cultural Chronicle of the Weimar Republic. Scarecrow Press, 2008.
