= Aschersleben/Land =

Coordinates: 51°45′N 11°28′E

Aschersleben/Land is a former Verwaltungsgemeinschaft ("collective municipality") in the Salzlandkreis district, in Saxony-Anhalt, Germany. The seat of the Verwaltungsgemeinschaft was in Aschersleben. It was disbanded in January 2009.

At the end of 2008, the Verwaltungsgemeinschaft Aschersleben/Land consisted of the following municipalities:

1. Aschersleben
2. Groß Schierstedt
3. Schackenthal
4. Westdorf
