= The Diva =

1929 film

- Directed by: Kurt Blachy
- Written by: Hans Vietzke
- Produced by: Paul Dzewniak
- Cinematography: Gustave Preiss
- Production company: Eisbär-Film
- Release date: November 1929
- Country: Germany
- Languages: Silent; German intertitles

The Diva (German: Die Garde-Diva) is a 1929 German silent comedy film directed by Kurt Blachy.

The film's art direction was by Leopold Blonder.

== Cast ==
In alphabetical order

- Georg Alexander
- Betty Astor
- Gerhard Dammann
- Ágnes Esterházy
- Alfons Fryland
- Marion Gerth
- Harry Grunwald
- Karl Harbacher
- Karl Junge-Swinburne
- Anna Müller-Lincke
- Paul Rehkopf
- Ernst Rückert
- Ferdinand von Alten
- Wolfgang von Schwind
