= A World Without Men =

1914 German silent film

Madge Lessing (right) as Gusti in A World Without Men (1914)

A World Without Men (Die Welt ohne Männer) is a 1914 silent film made in Germany just before the start of World War I and directed by Max Mack. A comedy, it was written by Alexander Engel and Julius Horst.

The popular British entertainer Madge Lessing appeared at the Berlin Metropol in Berlin for four years before the start of World War I and during that period she made a number of films for Max Mack including The Blue Mouse (1913), Where Is Coletti? (1913) and A World Without Men (1914).

== Synopsis ==
A comedy in four acts, the film parodied the concerns at that time in Germany regarding women's emancipation and suffrage. The film centres on a young woman named Gusti (Madge Lessing), one of three sisters who refuse to consider any sort of a relationship with a man, believing that marriage simply confirmed the cruel dominance of men over women. However, Gusti meets a suitable suitor, Dr. Carl Waldeck (Otto Treptow), with whom she falls in love and their growing relationship leads to various comedic situations. She changes her mind about the beastly nature of men as she falls more for her handsome and near-perfect suitor.

== Cast ==
- Madge Lessing ... Gusti
- Ida Frey ... Paula
- Alvine Davis ... Christel
- Otto Treptow ... Dr. Carl Waldeck
- Herbert Paulmüller ... Dr. Specht
- Erwin Fichtner ... Assistant Fritz
- Martha Hoffmann ... Ludmilla
- Willy Lengling ... Schreiber Süssmilch
