= Roses Bloom on the Moorland (1929 film) =

1929 film

- A scene from the film portraying a group of French soldiers
- Directed by: Kurt Blachy
- Written by: Fritz Mischke (story); Hans Vietzke
- Produced by: Erich Eriksen
- Starring: Wolfgang von Schwind; Hertha Guthmar; Betty Astor
- Cinematography: Gustave Preiss
- Production company: Trianon-Film
- Release date: 25 December 1929
- Country: Germany
- Languages: Silent; German intertitles

Roses Bloom on the Moorland (German: Rosen blühen auf dem Heidegrab) is a 1929 German silent historical drama film directed by Kurt Blachy and starring Wolfgang von Schwind, Hertha Guthmar and Betty Astor. During the Napoleonic Wars a German inhabitant is sentenced to death for striking a French soldier who assaulted his wife.

Some scenes were shot on location on Lüneburg Heath. The film's sets were designed by August Rinaldi. It received a generally poor reception from critics on its release.

== Cast ==
- Wolfgang von Schwind as Martin Schlaeger, Dorfschulze
- Hertha Guthmar as Luise, seine Tochter
- Alfons Fryland as Joachim Schlaeger, Heidebauer
- Betty Astor as Anna, seine Frau
- Dietrich Henkels as Joachim, beider Sohn
- Karl Falkenberg as Bracke, Steuereinnehmer
- Gerhard Dammann as Mertens, Gastwirt
- Renate Noack as Martha, seine Tochter
- Robert Leffler as Pfarrer Holten
- Rudolf Klein-Rhoden as Klaus, der Köhler
- Anna Müller-Lincke as eine Magd
- Ferdinand von Alten as Hauptmann Maray
- Gerd Briese as junger Ehemann
- Hanni Reinwald as junge Ehefrau
- Alfred Loretto as Hannes, der Schmied
- Max Maximilian as Jean, Offiziersbursche
- Karl Platen as Schäfer
- Paul Rehkopf as Korporal Landry
- Ernst Rückert as Leutnant de Vale
- Magnus Stifter as Major Roisson

== Bibliography ==
- Alfred Krautz. International directory of cinematographers, set- and costume designers in film, Volume 4. Saur, 1984.
