= Willy Zeyn =

Willy Zeyn may refer to:

- Willy Zeyn (director) (1876–1946), German film director
- Willy Zeyn (editor) (1907–1983), his son, German film editor and producer
