= Madge Lessing =

British stage actress and singer

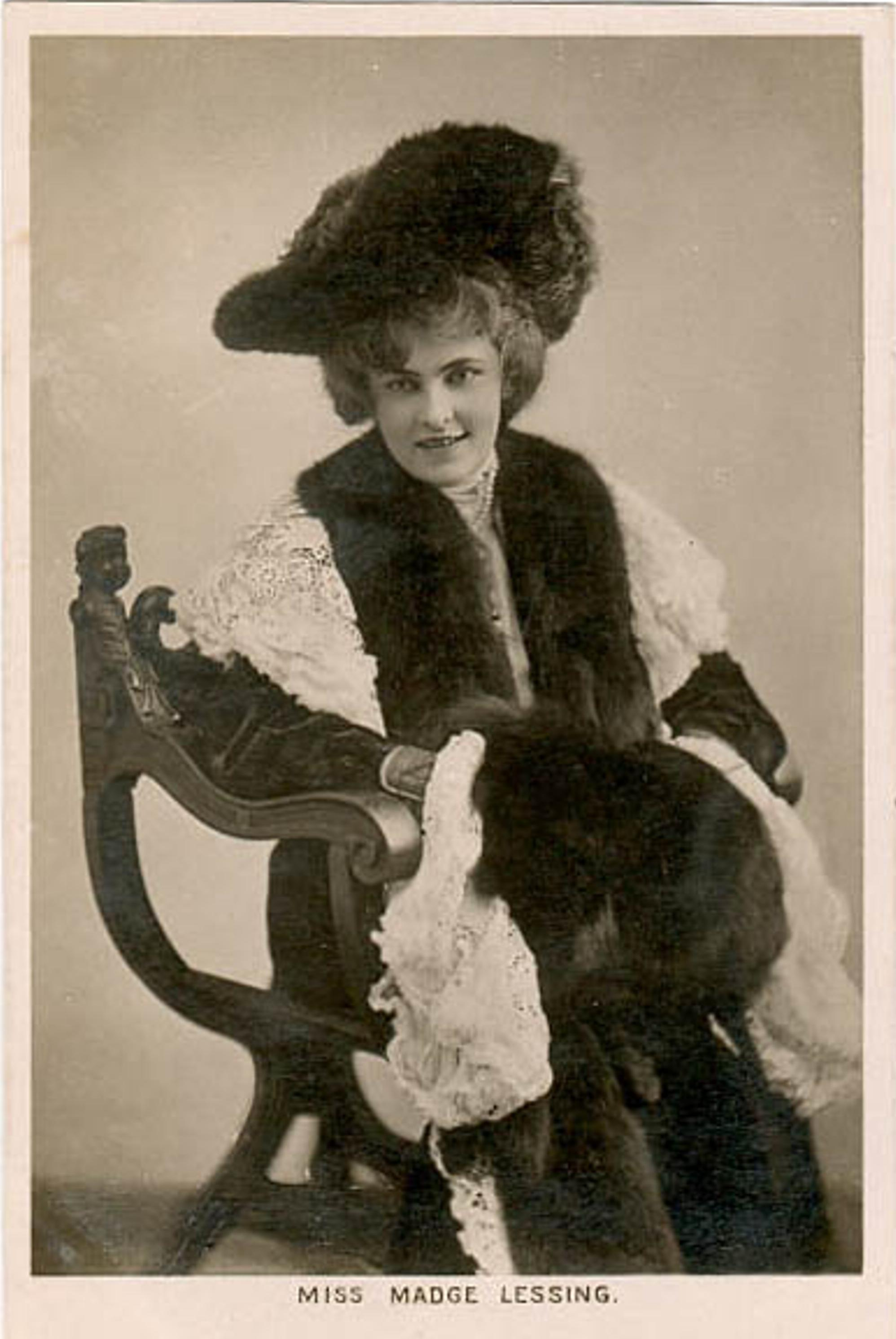
- Lessing c. 1900
- Born: Margaret O'Donnell; 27 November 1873; London, U.K.
- Died: 14 August 1966 (aged 92); Bournemouth, England, U.K.
- Occupation: Actress
- Years active: 1894–1921
- Spouse: George Brinton McLellan Jr.

Madge Lessing (27 November 1873 – 14 August 1966) was a British stage actress and singer, panto principal boy and postcard beauty of Edwardian musical comedy who had a successful career in the West End in London, Europe and on Broadway from 1890 to 1921 and who made a number of early film appearances in Germany for director Max Mack.

== Early career ==
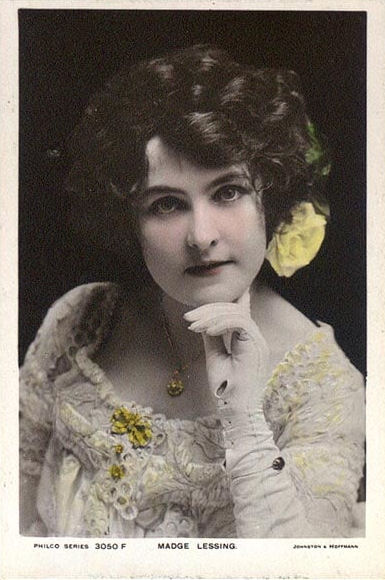
Madge Lessing photographed in 1905

Lessing was born as Margaret O'Donnell in London in 1873 to Irish parents Catherine (née Buckley) and James Patrick O'Donnell, an assurance agent. In interviews she claimed that she had run away from home to go on the stage travelling from London to the United States in about 1890 where she was a chorus girl at Koster and Bial's Music Hall in New York. After only three weeks she was promoted to the title role in the burlesque Belle Helene. Her next role was with the Solomon Opera Company followed by appearances as Chollie Keal in The Passing Show (1894). In May 1896 she opened in the musical revue In Gay New York at the Casino Theatre in New York. It was written by C. M. S. McLellan, who would later become her brother-in-law.

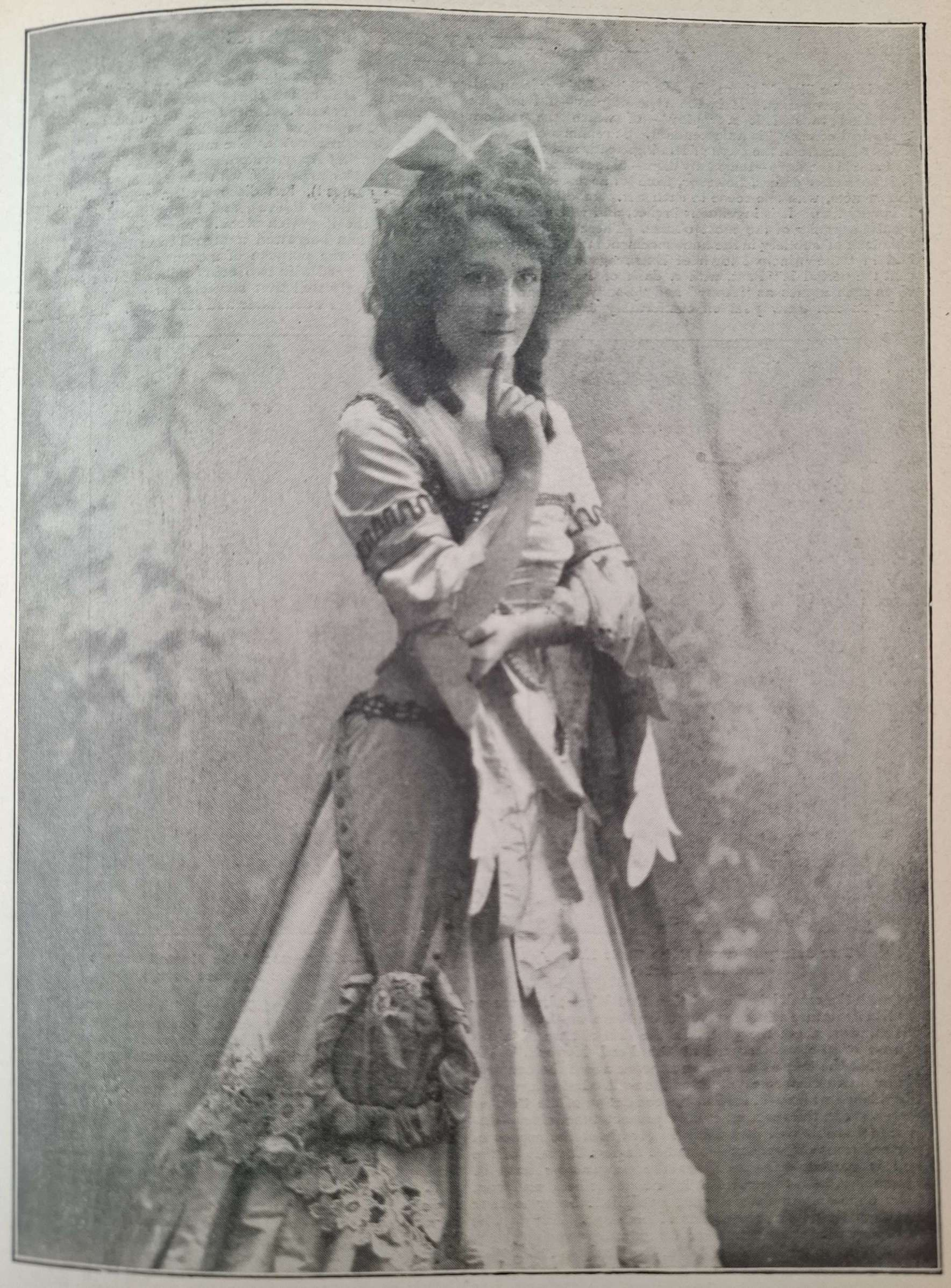
Photo of Madge Lessing, as seen in the Black and White Budget, 2 March 1901

An early and successful role was as the principal boy Jack Hubbard in Klaw and Erlanger's "extravaganza in three acts and six scenes" Jack and the Beanstalk which ran for 64 performances at the Casino Theatre in New York in 1896 and in 1898 at the Boston Museum in Boston and the Lafayette Square Opera House in Washington, D.C.

Her performance as Jack in 1896 was described as belonging:

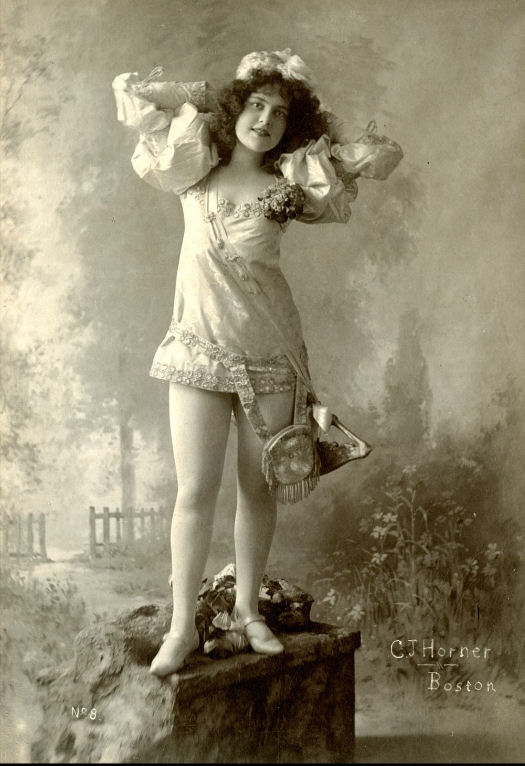
Lessing as Jack Hubbard in Jack and the Beanstalk at the Boston Museum (1898)

...to the class of womanly women. She was as femininely alluring amid the bald disclosures of unblushing fleshings as amid the tantalizing exasperations of swishing draperies. Her beauty was exuberant, voluptuous, pulse-stirring, a laughing, happy face, crowned and encircled with tangled masses of dark brown hair, which made her head almost too large, to be sure, though size counted for little amid the ravishments of sparkling eyes and kissable dimples that danced in and out on either cheek. Miss Lessing walked through this part of Jack - walking through was all that was demanded of her - with a pretty unaffectedness that met all requirements, and she sang with a voice of considerable sweetness, but of no great power. Still, she has in a mild, inoffensive way some small ability as an actress.

In 1899 she played in A Dangerous Maid for 64 performances at the Casino Theatre in New York, while in Boston at Christmas 1899 she appeared as 'Little Boy Blue' in 12 performances of the children's pantomime Little Red Riding Hood which in early January 1900 moved on to the Casino Theatre in New York, the home of the Broadway adult musical, where the production was transformed with additional female actresses added to the cast in scanty costumes and more risqué songs to cater for an adult audience. Next Lessing succeeded Mabelle Gilman as 'Priscilla' in the vaudeville The Rounders (1900) at the Columbia Theatre in Boston.

Of her performance in The Rounders a critic wrote:

It is a thankless task, that of successorship which results inevitably in direct comparisons, but Miss Lessing met the test surprisingly well. Without Miss Gilman's strength of personality and less apparent art, Miss Lessing indicated with unmistakable correctness the sentimental atmosphere of prudish modesty, which represents Priscilla as a dramatic character. With memories of Jack and the Beanstalk - they seem inevitable where Miss Lessing is concerned; one was a little bewildered at Priscilla's embarrassment in her ballet costume during the scene in Thea's dressing-room. This bewilderment was due to Miss Lessing's inability to impersonate. She is always Madge Lessing acting, never Madge Lessing identified with another and wholly different personality; and at the sight of Madge Lessing embarrassed because she wore tights, one had a right to be bewildered.

In 1900 she appeared in the title role in the two act operetta The Lady Slavey by Gustave Kerker and George Dance when that musical farce was revived in Boston and as Anita Tivoli in The Monks of Malabar.

== Return to Europe ==
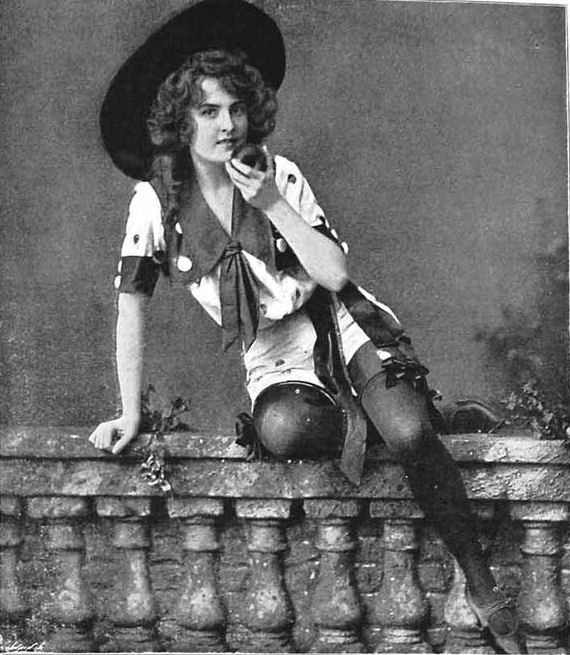
Lessing as Princess Beauty in the pantomime The Sleeping Beauty and the Prince (1901)

Christmas 1900 saw Lessing make her London début as Princess Beauty in the annual children's pantomime The Sleeping Beauty and the Prince at the Theatre Royal Drury Lane which ran for 134 performances. In 1901 she played Dimples in The Whirl of the Town and Violet Gray in the first revival of The Belle of New York at the Adelphi Theatre in London in 1902.

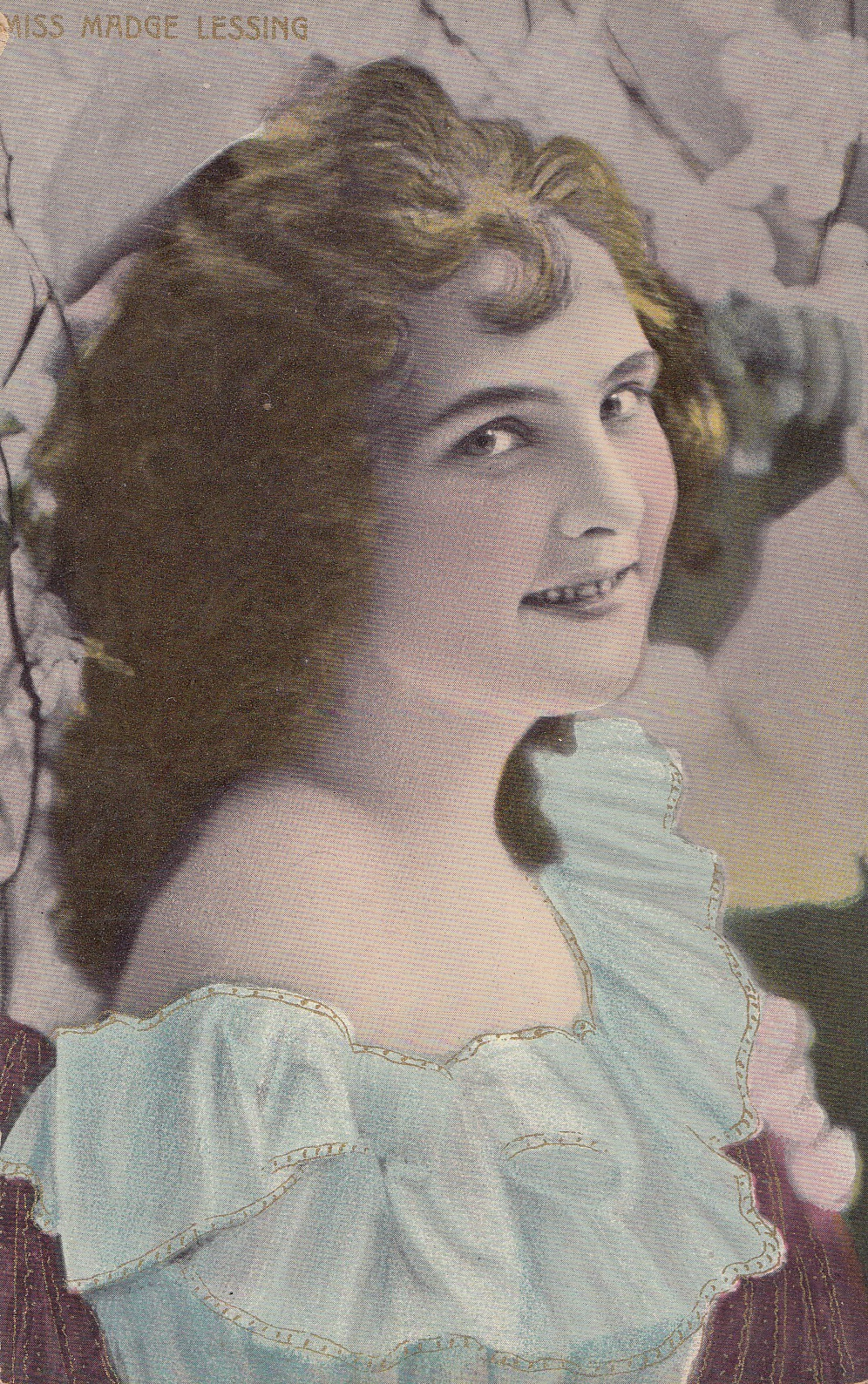
Vintage hand tinted postcard of actress Madge Lessing.

She appeared on the bill at the opening of the London Coliseum Theatre of Varieties on 24 December 1904 on a variety programme in which she sang "Goodbye, Little Girl", "My Irish Molly O" and a number of other popular hits of the time. Her other roles during this period include the title role in Em'ly (an adaptation of David Copperfield) at the Adelphi Theatre (1903), Jill opposite Dan Leno and Herbert Campbell in the pantomime Mother Goose at the Theatre Royal Drury Lane (1902) and appearances in Erminie at the Casino Theatre in New York (1903); Wang (1903) with the DeWolf Hopper Opera Company; Sergeant Brue at the Prince of Wales Theatre in London, (1904); Elsie in 18 matinee performances of the piratical tale Noah's Ark at the Waldorf Theatre in London (1906) in which "Miss Madge Lessing laughed and danced and sang very charmingly, and seemed to enjoy everything quite as much as the children on the stage or in the front of the house"; The Prince of Pilsen (1907/8) at the Olympia Theatre in Paris, and Halloh! (1909) at the Berlin Metropol. Lessing was also the dance partner to Will Bishop in the Berlin Metropol revue Chauffeur-ins Metropol in 1912. While in Berlin she appeared in a number of films for director Max Mack including as Fritzl Lustig in The Blue Mouse (1913), Lolotte in Where Is Coletti? (1913) and Gusti in A World Without Men (1914). She remained at the Metropol for four years until the outbreak of World War I forced her to return to England where she played in the London production of Sleeping Partners and the leading role in The Girl from Ciro's.

== Latter years ==
In 1920 she returned to the United States, where she played again in Erminie at the Park Theatre in New York in 1921. This was her last known performance on the professional stage.

== Personal life ==
She married the London-based American theatrical manager and producer George Brinton McLellan (1867-1932), the brother of playwright C. M. S. McLellan. He was probably best known for the popular play Is Zat So? (1925) which ran for 634 performances at the 39th Street Theatre in New York and opened in the same year at the Adelphi Theatre and who had previously been married to the musical comedy actress Pauline Hall from 1894 to 1902.

Madge Lessing McLellan died in Bournemouth in 1966 aged 92.
