= What a Woman Dreams of in Springtime =

What a Woman Dreams of in Springtime may refer to:

- What a Woman Dreams of in Springtime (1929 film), a German silent comedy film
- What a Woman Dreams of in Springtime (1959 film), a West German romantic comedy film
