= Franz Ludwig =

German actor (1833–1908)

- Born: 8 April 1876; Berlin, German Empire
- Died: 16 November 1927 (aged 51); Bad Neuenahr, Germany
- Occupation: Actor
- Years active: 1914–1927 (film)

Franz Ludwig (1876–1927) was a German stage and film actor. He became known for his portrayals of the German Chancellor Otto Von Bismarck.

== Selected filmography ==
- Bismarck (1914)
- Bismarck (1925)
- Bismarck 1862–1898 (1927)
- The Vulture Wally (1940)

== Bibliography ==
- Kasten, Jürgen; Bruns, Brigitte (2005). Erna Morena. Munich: Belleville. ISBN 978-3-936298-52-9.
