= Bismarck (1925 film) =

1925 film

- Directed by: Ernst Wendt
- Written by: Max Jungk; Julius Urgiß; Ludwig Ziehen
- Produced by: Josef Coböken
- Starring: Franz Ludwig; Erna Morena; Robert Leffler
- Cinematography: Ernst Lüttgens
- Production company: Bismarck-Film
- Distributed by: Filmhaus Bruckmann
- Release date: 24 December 1925
- Country: Germany
- Languages: Silent; German intertitles

Bismarck is a 1925 German silent historical film directed by Ernst Wendt and starring Franz Ludwig, Erna Morena, and Robert Leffler. It portrays the life of the nineteenth century German Chancellor Otto Von Bismarck. It was part of a popular trend of Prussian films released in Germany after the First World War. It was followed by a second film, also starring Ludwig, in 1927.

The film's sets were designed by the art director Robert Neppach.

== Cast ==
- Franz Ludwig
- Erna Morena
- Robert Leffler
- Ralph Ludwig
- Rudolf Lettinger
- Maria Santen
- Bruno Ziener
- Ernst Bochum
- Carl de Vogt
- Georg John
- Erich Kaiser-Titz
- Adolf Klein
- Philipp Manning
- Eugen Moebius
- Rio Nobile
- Albert Paul
- Hedwig Pauly-Winterstein
- Heinrich Peer
- Hermann Picha
- Ernst Rückert
- Margarete Schön
- Franz Schönfeld
- Viktor Senger
- Franz Verdier
- Senta Villain
- Leopold von Ledebur
- Wolfgang von Schwind
- Toni Zimmerer

== Bibliography ==
- Grange, William (2008). Cultural Chronicle of the Weimar Republic. Lanham, MD: Scarecrow Press. ISBN 978-0-8108-5967-8.
