= Mehringen =

Coordinates: 51.717°N 11.500°E

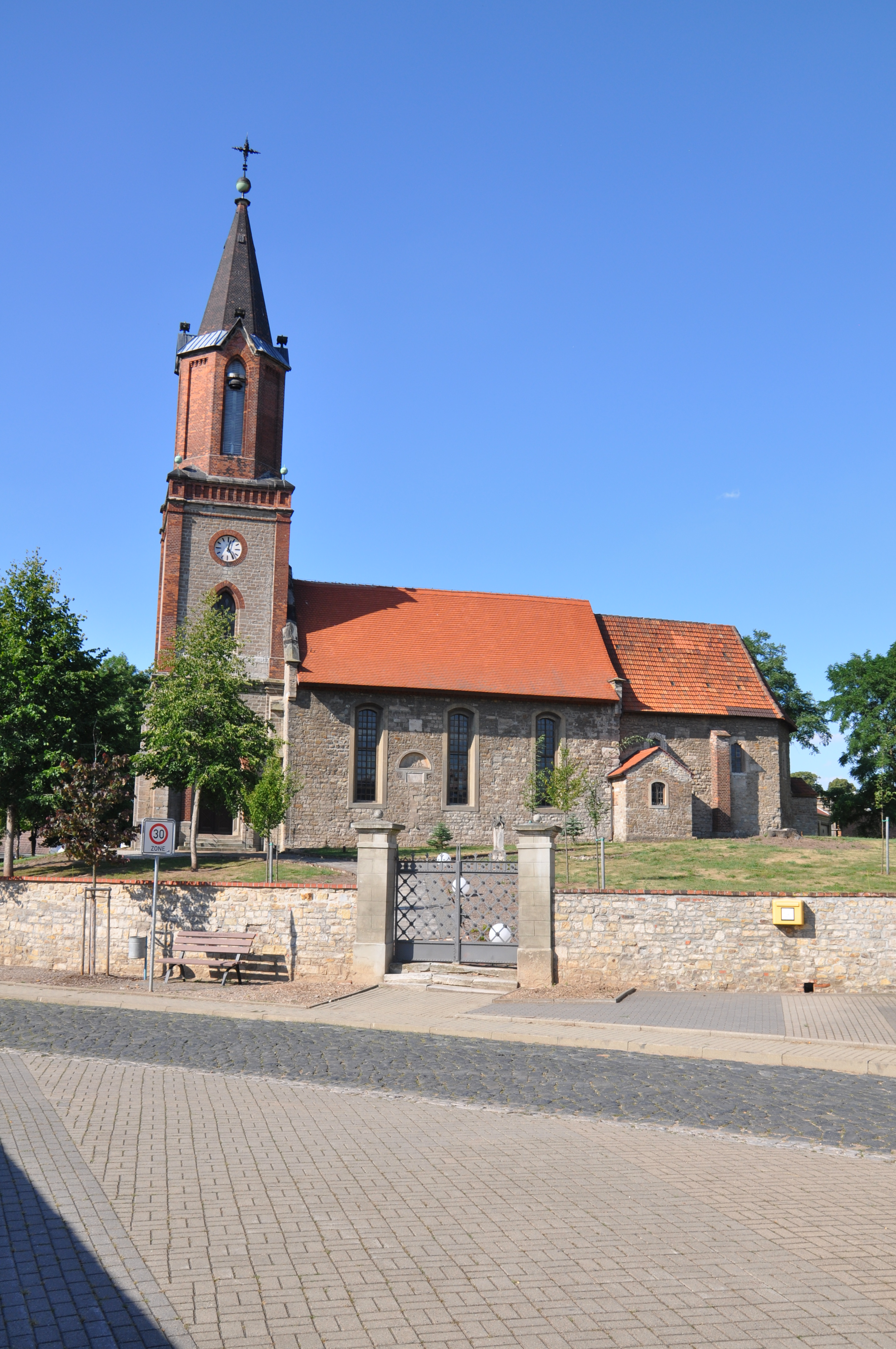
St. Stephani church, Aschersleben-Mehringen

Mehringen is a former municipality in the district of Salzlandkreis, in Saxony-Anhalt, Germany. Since 1 January 2008, it has been part of the town of Aschersleben.

== See also ==
- Drohndorf
- Freckleben
