= Freckleben =

Coordinates: 51°42′N 11°33′E

Freckleben is a former municipality in the district of Salzlandkreis, in Saxony-Anhalt, Germany. Since 1 January 2008, it is part of the town Aschersleben.

== See also ==
- Drohndorf
- Mehringen
