= Neu Königsaue =

- Stadtteil of Aschersleben
- Interactive map of Neu Königsaue
- Location within Germany Location within Saxony-Anhalt
- Coordinates: 51°49′55″N 11°24′6″E
- Country: Germany
- State: Saxony-Anhalt
- District: Salzlandkreis
- Town: Aschersleben

Area
  - Total: 9.16 km^{2} (3.54 sq mi)
- Elevation: 118 m (387 ft)

Population (2006-12-31)
  - Total: 344
  - Density: 37.6/km^{2} (97.3/sq mi)
- Time zone: UTC+01:00 (CET)
  - Summer (DST): UTC+02:00 (CEST)
- Postal codes: 06449
- Dialling codes: 034741
- Vehicle registration: SLK

Neu Königsaue is a village and a former municipality in the district of Salzlandkreis, in Saxony-Anhalt, Germany. Since 1 January 2009, it is part of the town Aschersleben.
