= The New Paradise =

1921 film

- Directed by: Willy Zeyn
- Written by: Erich Kraft; Armin Petersen
- Starring: Esther Carena; Max Adalbert; Arthur Bergen
- Cinematography: Kurt Lande; Johannes Männling
- Production company: Neutral-Film
- Release date: 14 April 1921
- Country: Germany
- Languages: Silent; German intertitles

The New Paradise (German: Das neue Paradies) is a 1921 German silent film directed by Willy Zeyn and starring Esther Carena, Max Adalbert and Arthur Bergen.

The film's sets were designed by the art director Franz Schroedter.

== Cast ==
- Esther Carena
- Max Adalbert
- Arthur Bergen
- Frida Richard
- Anna Müller-Lincke
- Ferry Sikla
- Maria Voigtsberger

== Bibliography ==
- Paolo Caneppele. Entscheidungen der Tiroler Filmzensur 1919-1920-1921: mit einem Index der in Tirol verbotenen Filme 1916–1922. Film Archiv Austria, 2002.
