= Bismarck 1862–1898 =

1927 German film by Kurt Blachy

- Franz Ludwig as Bismarck
- Directed by: Kurt Blachy
- Written by: Ludwig Ziehen
- Starring: Franz Ludwig; Erna Morena; Robert Leffler
- Cinematography: Willy Großstück
- Music by: Felix Bartsch
- Production company: Bismarck-Film
- Distributed by: Bismarck-Film
- Release date: 7 January 1927
- Running time: 112 minutes
- Country: Germany
- Languages: Silent; German intertitles

Bismarck or Bismarck 1862–1898 is a 1927 German silent historical film directed by Kurt Blachy and starring Franz Ludwig, Robert Leffler and Erna Morena. It was made as a follow-up to the 1925 film Bismarck which had also starred Ludwig. Because of this it is sometimes referred to as Bismarck Part II. The film depicts the latter part of Otto von Bismarck's career including his long spell as Chancellor of Germany.

It was shot at the Halensee Studios in Berlin. The film's sets were designed by the art director Willi Herrmann.The film was poorly received by the political right who accused it of "reducing a genius to the level of banality".

== Cast ==
- Franz Ludwig as Otto von Bismarck
- Robert Leffler
- Erna Morena
- Ralph Ludwig as Otto von Bismarck as a Child
- Bruno Ziener
- Heinrich Peer
- Adolf Klein
- Viktor Senger
- Wolfgang von Schwindt
- Rudolf Lettinger
- Maria Santen
- Carl de Vogt
- Barbara von Annenkoff
- Hugo Flink

== Bibliography ==
- Grange, William (2008). Cultural Chronicle of the Weimar Republic. Lanham, MD: Scarecrow Press. ISBN 978-0-8108-5967-8.
- Kasten, Jürgen; Bruns, Brigitte (2005). Erna Morena. Munich: Belleville. ISBN 978-3-936298-52-9.
