= The Gambler (1919 film) =

1919 film

- Directed by: Willy Zeyn
- Written by: Ludwig Wolff (novel)
- Produced by: Alfred Braun
- Starring: Käthe Haack; Heinrich Peer
- Cinematography: Marius Holdt
- Production company: Asslan-Film-Continentale
- Release date: 5 March 1919
- Country: Germany
- Languages: Silent; German intertitles

The Gambler (German: Die Spieler) is a 1919 German silent film directed by Willy Zeyn and starring Käthe Haack and Heinrich Peer.

== Cast ==
In alphabetical order

- Karl Beckersachs as Graf Hanal
- Alfred Braun as Stöckel
- Käthe Haack as Seine Tochter
- Leonhard Haskel as Theateragent
- Helga Molander as Lisa Diether
- Heinrich Peer as Rittmeister von Löcknitz
- Leopold von Ledebur as Graf Miersdorf
- Else Wasa as Frau von Löcknitz

== Bibliography ==
- Grange, William (2008). Cultural Chronicle of the Weimar Republic. Lanham, MD: Scarecrow Press. ISBN 978-0-8108-5967-8.
