= Robert Leffler =

German actor

- Born: 9 January 1866; Aschersleben, Kingdom of Prussia
- Died: 15 March 1940 (aged 74); Berlin, Nazi Germany
- Occupations: Actor, film director, singer
- Years active: 1921–1936 (film)

Robert Leffler (9 January 1866 – 15 March 1940) was a German actor, film director, and opera singer (bass).

== Selected filmography ==
- The Haunted Castle (1921)
- The Fear of Women (1921)
- Rose of the Asphalt Streets (1922)
- A Dying Nation (1922)
- The Circle of Death (1922)
- The Man of Steel (1922)
- The Expulsion (1923)
- The Secret of Brinkenhof (1923)
- The Comedian's Child (1923)
- Friedrich Schiller (1923)
- Wilhelm Tell (1923)
- Comedy of the Heart (1924)
- By Order of Pompadour (1924)
- Horrido (1924)
- A Free People (1925)
- The Island of Dreams (1925)
- Bismarck (1925)
- Comedians (1925)
- The Blackguard (1925)
- Goetz von Berlichingen of the Iron Hand (1925)
- The Good Reputation (1926)
- Derby (1926)
- The Clever Fox (1926)
- Only a Dancing Girl (1926)
- Watch on the Rhine (1926)
- Two and a Lady (1926)
- The Adventurers (1926)
- Sister Veronika (1927)
- Carnival Magic (1927)
- Bismarck 1862–1898 (1927)
- The Harbour Bride (1927)
- The Old Fritz (1928)
- Roses Bloom on the Moorland (1929)
- Crucified Girl (1929)
- A Mother's Love (1929)
- Elisabeth of Austria (1931)
- Uncle Bräsig (1936)
