= Aschersleben =

Town in Saxony-Anhalt, Germany

- Town
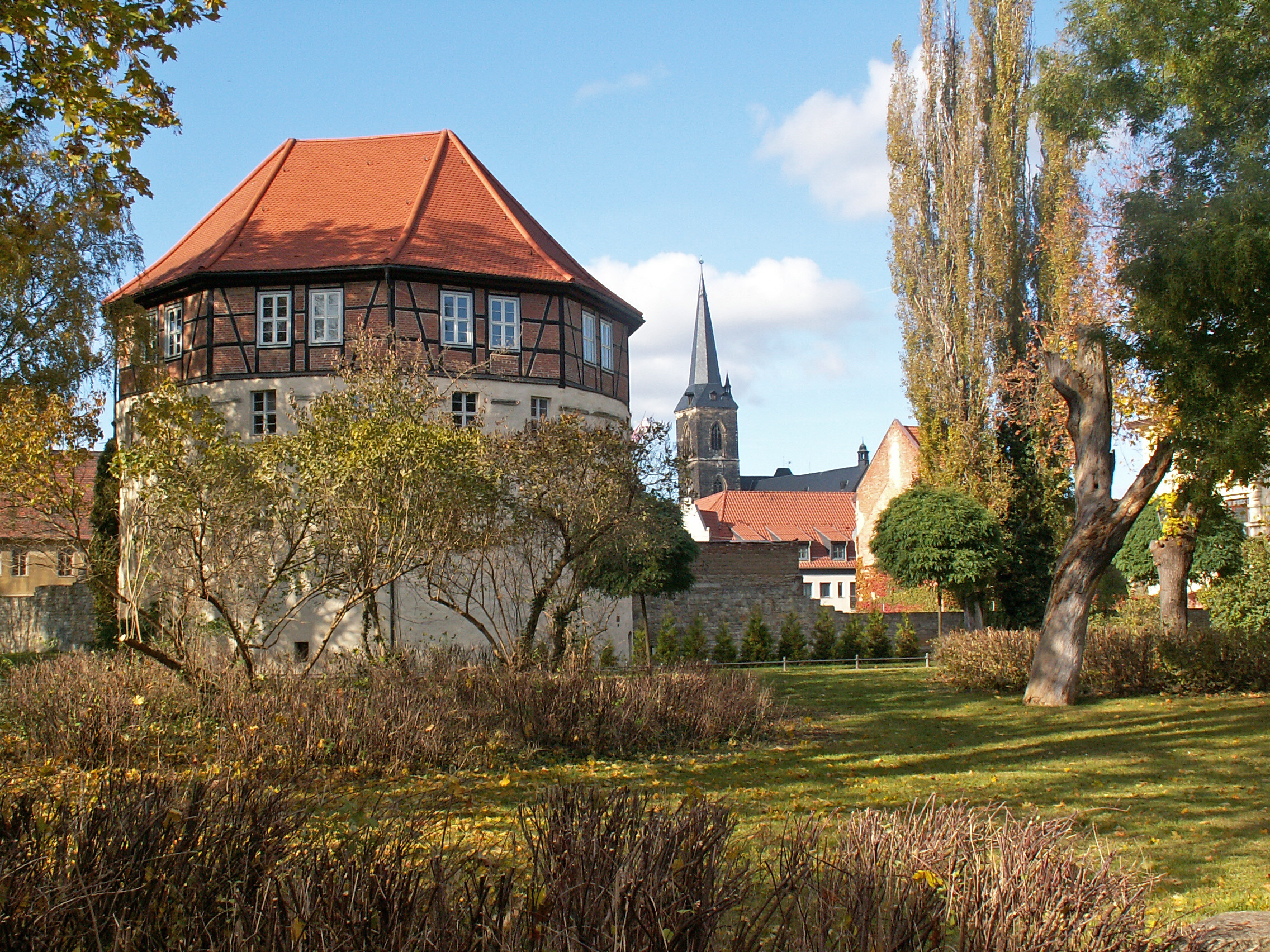
- View from Rondell to St. Stephani Church

- Coat of arms

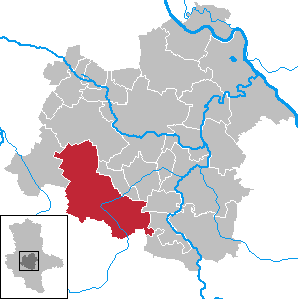
- Location of Aschersleben within Salzlandkreis district
- Interactive map of Aschersleben
- Location within Germany Location within Saxony-Anhalt
- Coordinates: 51°45′N 11°28′E
- Country: Germany
- State: Saxony-Anhalt
- District: Salzlandkreis
- Subdivisions: 6

Government
  - Mayor (2022–29): Steffen Amme

Area
  - Total: 156.31 km^{2} (60.35 sq mi)
- Elevation: 114 m (374 ft)

Population (2025-12-31)
  - Total: 25,364
  - Density: 162.27/km^{2} (420.27/sq mi)
- Time zone: UTC+01:00 (CET)
  - Summer (DST): UTC+02:00 (CEST)
- Postal codes: 06449
- Dialling codes: 03473
- Vehicle registration: SLK, ASL
- Website: www.aschersleben.de (in German)

Aschersleben (German pronunciation: [ˈaʃɐsleːbn̩]) is a town in the Salzlandkreis district, in Saxony-Anhalt, Germany. It is situated approximately 22 km east of Quedlinburg, and 45 km northwest of Halle (Saale).

== Geography ==
Aschersleben lies near the confluence of the rivers Eine and Wipper. The town Aschersleben consists of Aschersleben proper and the following Ortschaften or municipal divisions:

- Drohndorf
- Freckleben
- Groß Schierstedt
- Klein Schierstedt
- Mehringen
- Neu Königsaue
- Schackenthal
- Schackstedt
- Westdorf
- Wilsleben
- Winningen

== History ==
=== Pre-20th century ===
Aschersleben was first mentioned in 753, making it the oldest town of Saxony-Anhalt. The Latin name of the town's castle, Ascharia, provided the name of the House of Ascania. It obtained municipal status in 1266 and achieved the right to build a city wall with defense towers in 1322. Nearly the whole medieval city wall is well-preserved and 15 towers can still be visited today. From 1252–1315 Aschersleben was the capital of Anhalt-Aschersleben, after which it passed to the Bishopric of Halberstadt. In 1426 Aschersleben became a member of the Hanseatic League and due to hop trade an economic boom started. The soil around Aschersleben was very good for cultivating hop, and a special market place (Hopfenmarkt, Hop Market) was laid out for hop trade. In the centre of Aschersleben a place called Hopfenmarkt still exists today. After the 1648 Peace of Westphalia, it became part of the Principality of Halberstadt. Aschersleben became part of the Prussian Province of Saxony in 1815.

=== Nazi Germany ===
A Junkers serial fuselage production facility was located in Aschersleben during the time of Nazi Germany. In April 1935 tools were transferred to Aschersleben, and by May 1935 the first fuselages were built there. The facility was located in the Wilslebener Strasse 9 near the so-called Seewiesen, where an airfield was erected as well. The Aschersleben shop area reached 564,000 square metres and about 6,000 people were employed there.

During World War II, a subcamp of the Buchenwald concentration camp was located in the town. It was established to provide slave labour for Junkers (aircraft) and Motorenwerk (automotive). Aschersleben suffered considerable bomb damage from 1940 to 1945, especially on 31 March 1945 when the railway station, several factories and the residential area Johannisvorstadt were destroyed. About 20% of the town were destroyed during nine air raids.

From July 1944, about 950 KZ prisoners were forced to work at the Junkers Flugzeugwerke in Aschersleben. In April 1945, production was terminated. On 17 April U.S. forces occupied Aschersleben, but on 23 May the town was handed over to the British forces and on 1 July, it was finally handed over to the Soviets.

Aschersleben was bombed on the following dates during the war:

- 1 April 1942 first British bomb attack
- 16 January 1945
- 14 February 1945
- 20 February 1944 U.S. day attack, failed target due to cloudy weather
- 27 February 1945
- 20 March 1945
- 31 March 1945, more than 80 persons lost their lives
- 11 April 1945, 17 persons lost their lives in the hospital which was heavily damaged by bombs, and 22 died when a house in Blumenstraße was hit by bombs.
- 14 April 1945

At the end of World War II, Junkers-Aschersleben was mostly intact and the production was just changing for the production of the jet fighter Heinkel He 162. Most installations were dismantled and transferred to Kiev in the Soviet Union by the Soviets in 1946. The remaining facility buildings at Aschersleben were later used by VEB Kombinat Fritz Heckert. Today the area is used by Schiess AG.

=== Post-1945 ===
Aschersleben was part of East Germany until 1990, when it became part of Saxony-Anhalt during German reunification. On 1 January 2008, the former municipalities of Drohndorf, Freckleben and Mehringen were incorporated into Aschersleben. On 1 January 2009, the former municipalities of Groß Schierstedt, Neu Königsaue, Schackenthal and Westdorf were absorbed, and the Verwaltungsgemeinschaft Aschersleben/Land was disbanded. On 1 January 2010 Schackstedt was incorporated.

== Architecture and Sights ==
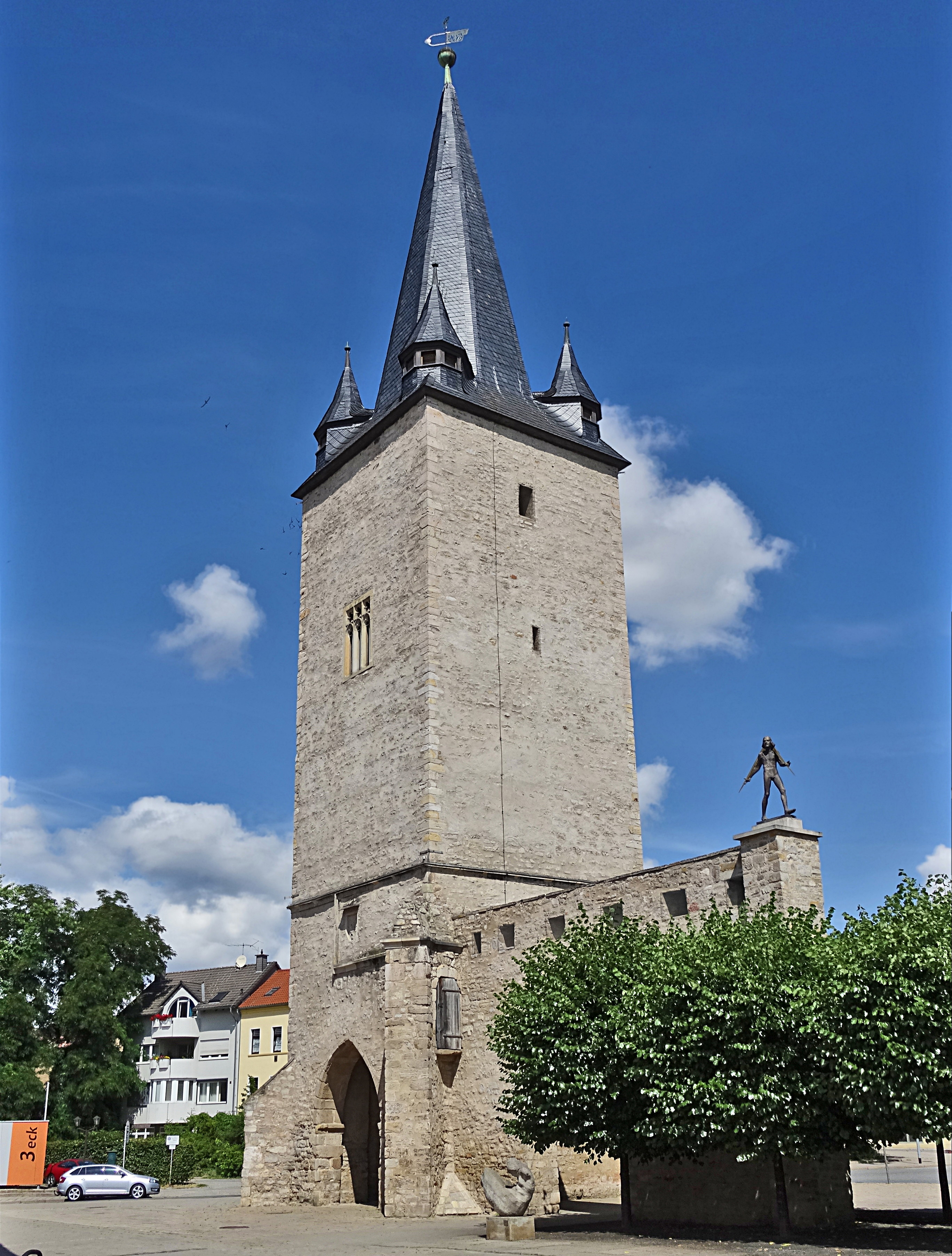
Tower of former Johannis Gate

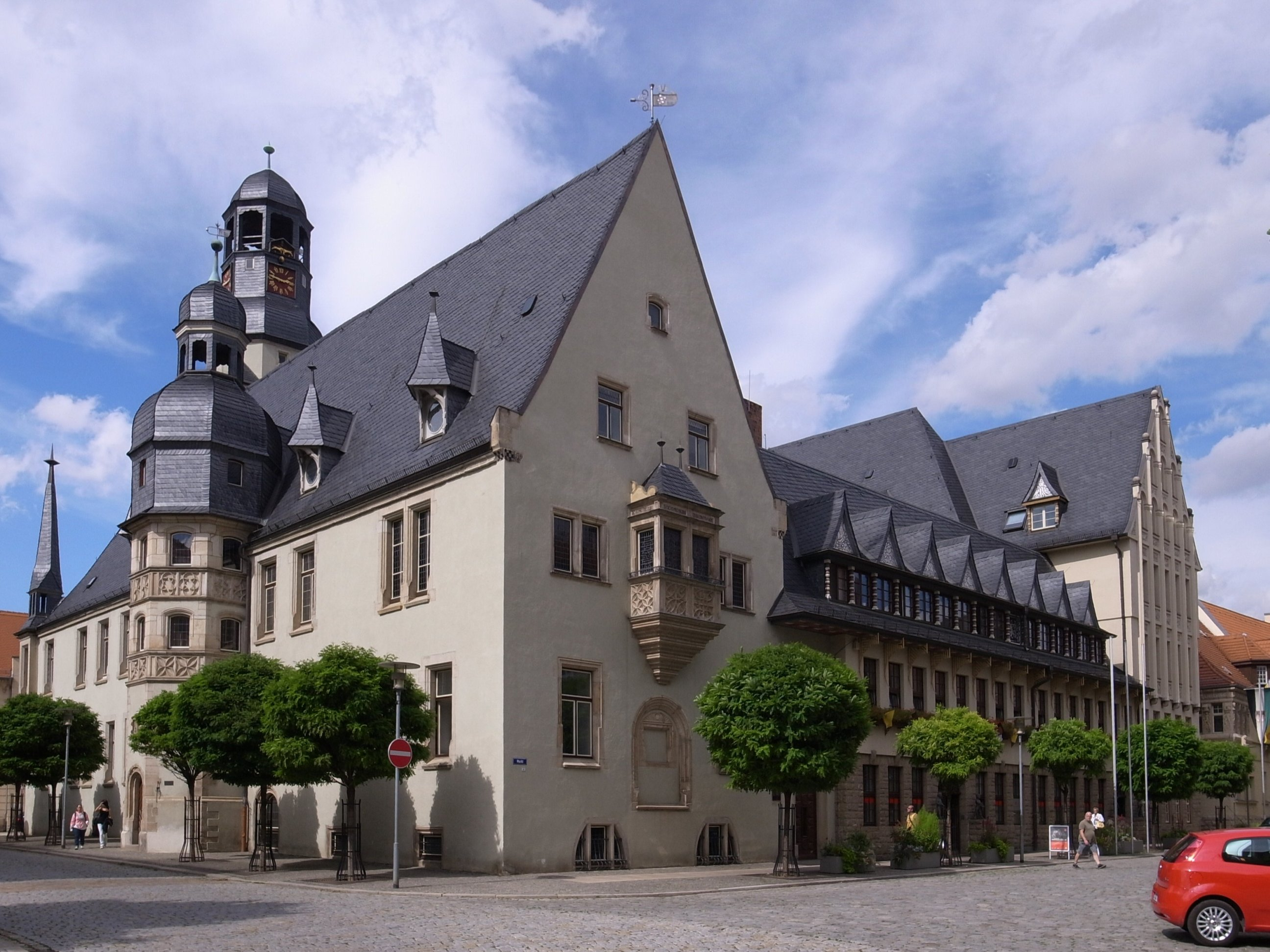
Town Hall

Several architectural styles are represented in Aschersleben. The historic centre is dominated by romanesque (Grauer Hof), gothic (St. Stephani Church), renaissance (Town hall, Krukmannsches Haus) and baroque architecture.

There is a ring of buildings in neoclassical and Jugendstil styles around the historic Old Town. This, in turn, is surrounded and interspersed with buildings of early modernism like the Heckner-Bauten and buildings from the GDR era. Large new areas are mainly in the north and south-east of the town.

Aschersleben is one of few German towns showing large segments (1.8 km) of the medieval city wall (originally 2.2 km) preserved through the centuries, although often integrated into later residential buildings. The city wall defines a promenade ring around the historic Old Town. Originally there were five gates in the city wall, but all but one (Johannistor) were demolished in the 19th century. Several towers were demolished as well, but out of 51 towers and bastions there are still 15 existing. The eleven towers which can be visited are the following:

- Johannistorturm (built in 1380, 42 metres) above Johannis Gate
- Turm am Marsfeld (1443, 26 metres) which can be climbed during guided tours
- Liebenwahnscher Turm (1442, 27 metres) which was above Liebenwahnsches Gate (demolished in 1831)
- Rondell (1507, diameter measuring 17 metres)
- Stumpfer Turm (1440, 23 metres) which can be climbed during guided tours
- Spitze Bastion (1467) which was used as a prison for some time
- Große Schale (1436, 12 metres, diameter of 8.5 metres, with 12 loop-holes)
- Schale an der Luisenpromenade (1442, 16 metres)
- Zwinger (1461)
- Rabenturm (1442, 31 metres, with 21 loop-holes) which can be climbed during guided tours
- Schmaler Heinrich (1442, very small basis measuring 6x6 metres) which can be climbed during guided tours

St. Stephani Church is a Protestant church which was built in the 14th century in a gothic style with three naves. It is close to the Town Hall dating from 1517 to which various oriel windows and wings were added in the 19th and 20th centuries.

St. Margarethen Church is a Roman Catholic church which was built around 1100 and mentioned in a document in 1303 for the first time. In 1410 it burnt down and was not rebuilt before 1586. Its baptismal font dates from 1587. Sometimes it is called Marktkirche (Market Church) or Heilig-Kreuz-Kirche (Church of the Holy Cross)

There are few half-timbered buildings in the old town of Aschersleben. The reasons for this is the availability of good stone material and the absence of large forests in the vicinity, as well as numerous fires before the 16th century. Nevertheless, there are numerous buildings, which are partly half-timbered, usually the upper floors. One of the oldest buildings is Lederer Bräustübl, a former brewery which was built in 1512 and enlarged in 1600 when a renaissance oriel window with stone carvings was added. Grauer Hof dating from the 12th century is considered to be the oldest house in town, and Krukmannsches Haus is a renaissance house built in 1572 the half-timbered upper floor of which was added later.

One of the most interesting fountains is Kuntzebrunnen dating from 1904 which consists of a sandstone column, three candelabrums, four lions and four basins. It was donated by the owners of a soap factory, Gustav Carl Kuntze (1852–1923) and his brother Emil Robert Kuntze (1860–1930) who lived in the street where it was erected. The place named after a former medieval city gate which was demolished is called "Vor dem Hohen Tor".

== Parks ==
Herrenbreite is the largest park in the town center. It was laid out in the 15th century as shooting-grounds and restructured in 2010 when the Landesgartenschau Exhibition took place in Saxony Anhalt. There are various fountains, sculptures and memorials in the park. The most famous sculpture is the Moon Sculpture dating from 2010.

== Twin towns – sister cities ==
Aschersleben is twinned with:

- Kerava, Finland
- Peine, Germany
- Trenčianske Teplice, Slovakia

== Notable people ==
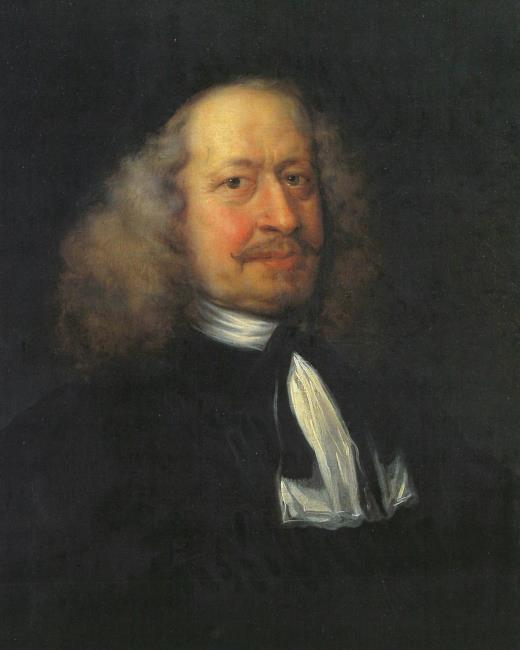
Adam Olearius

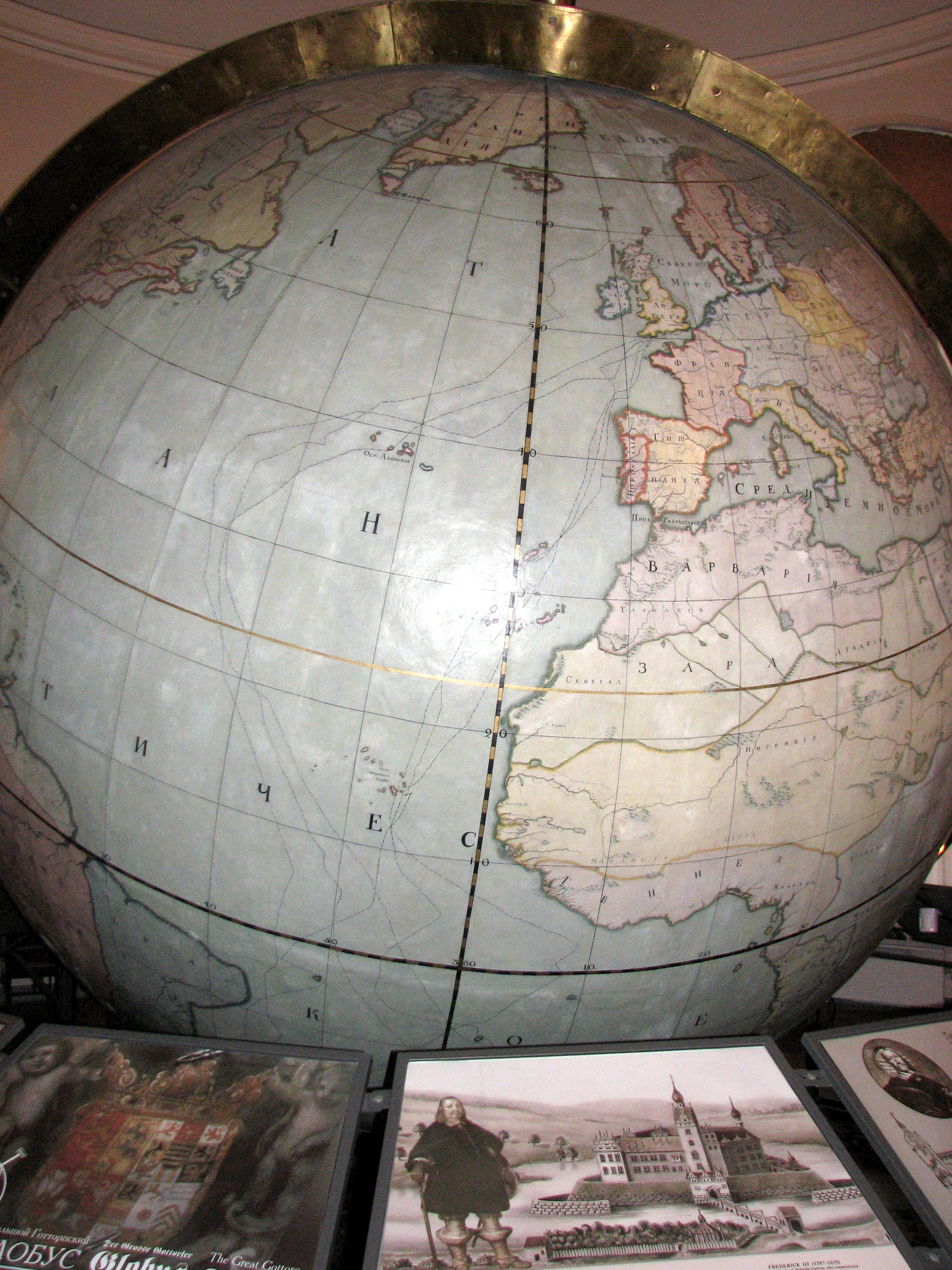
Globe of Gottorf

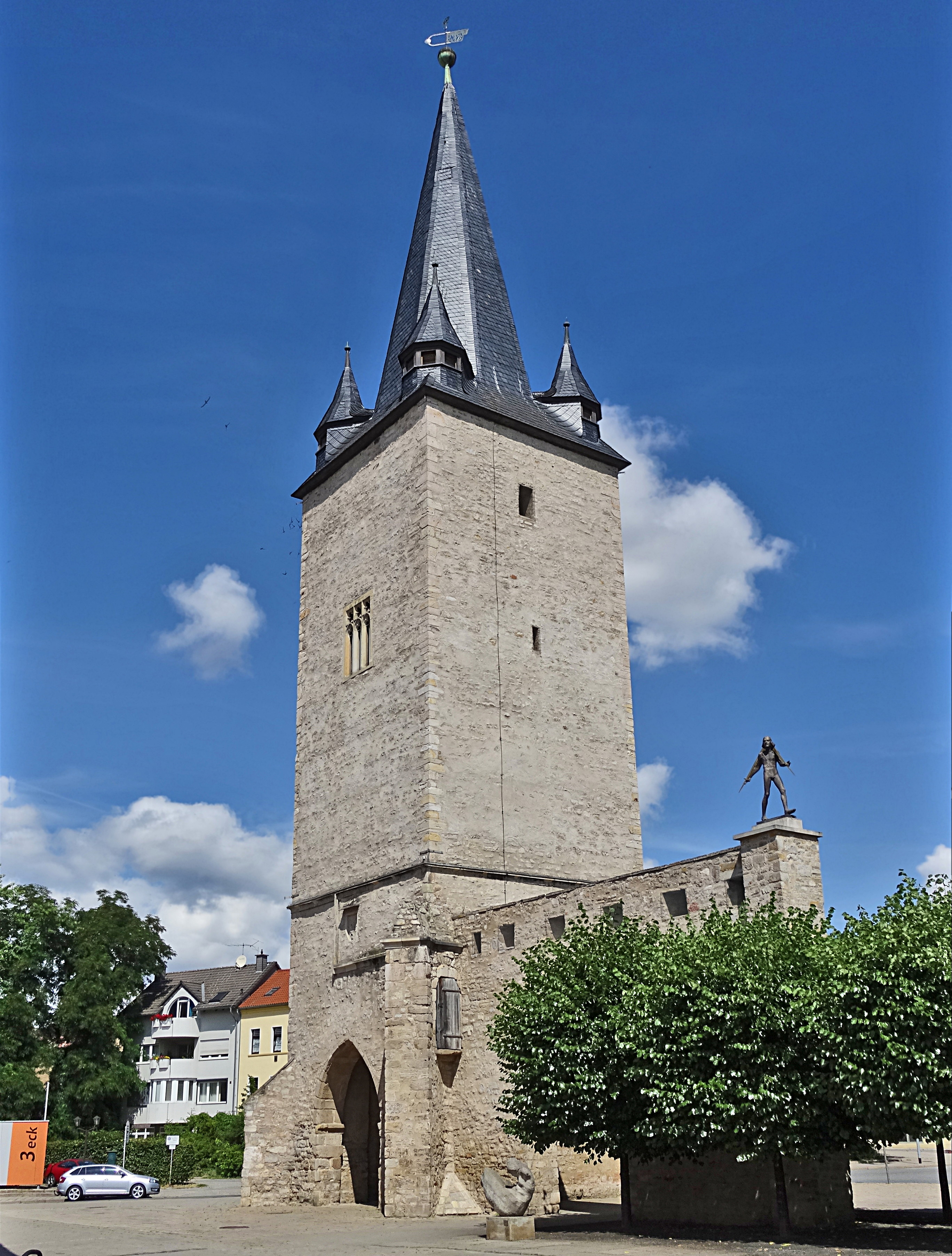
John's city gate tower with the statue of Olearius opened in 2010 near his birthplace.

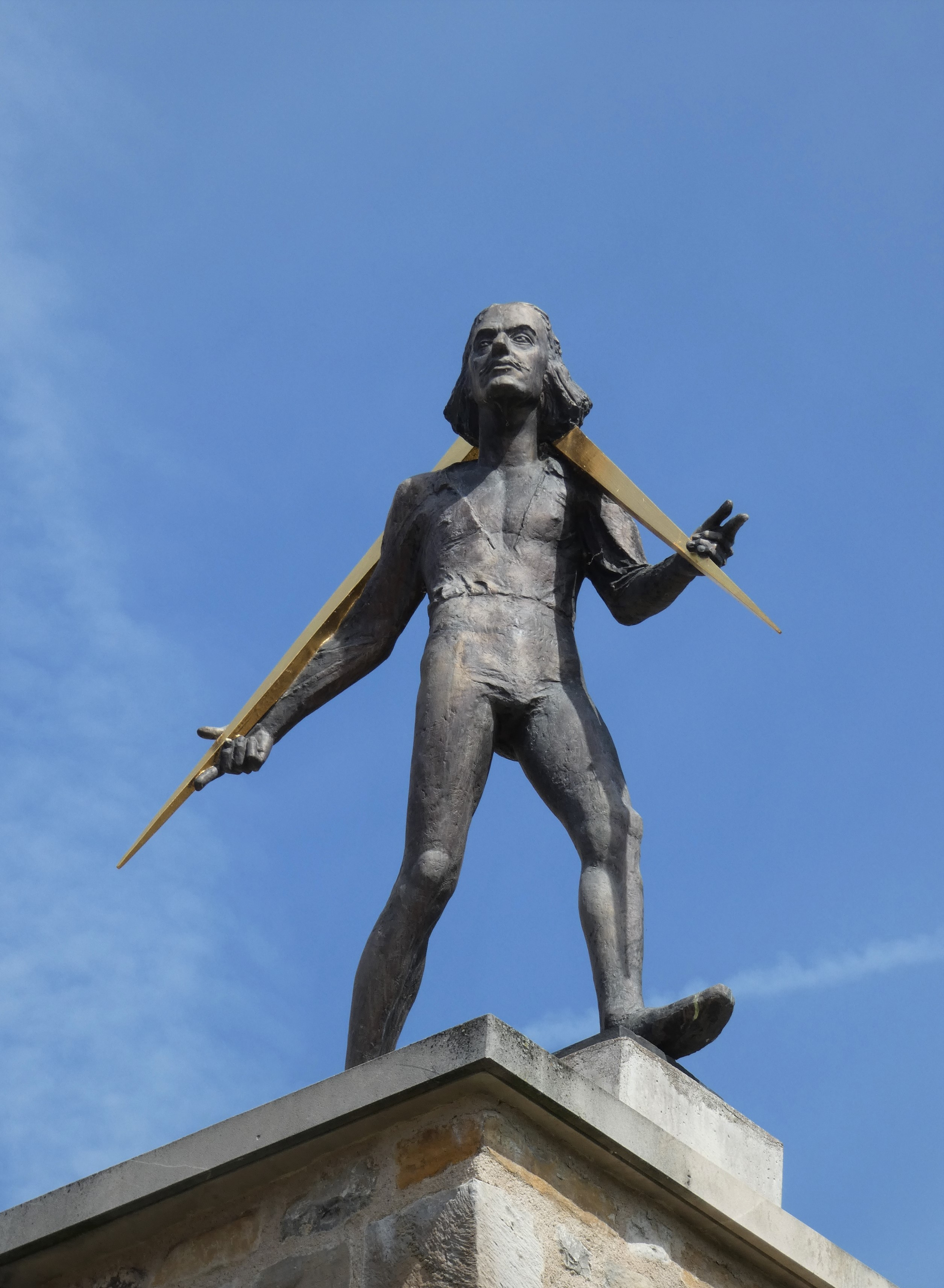
Statue of Adam Olearius

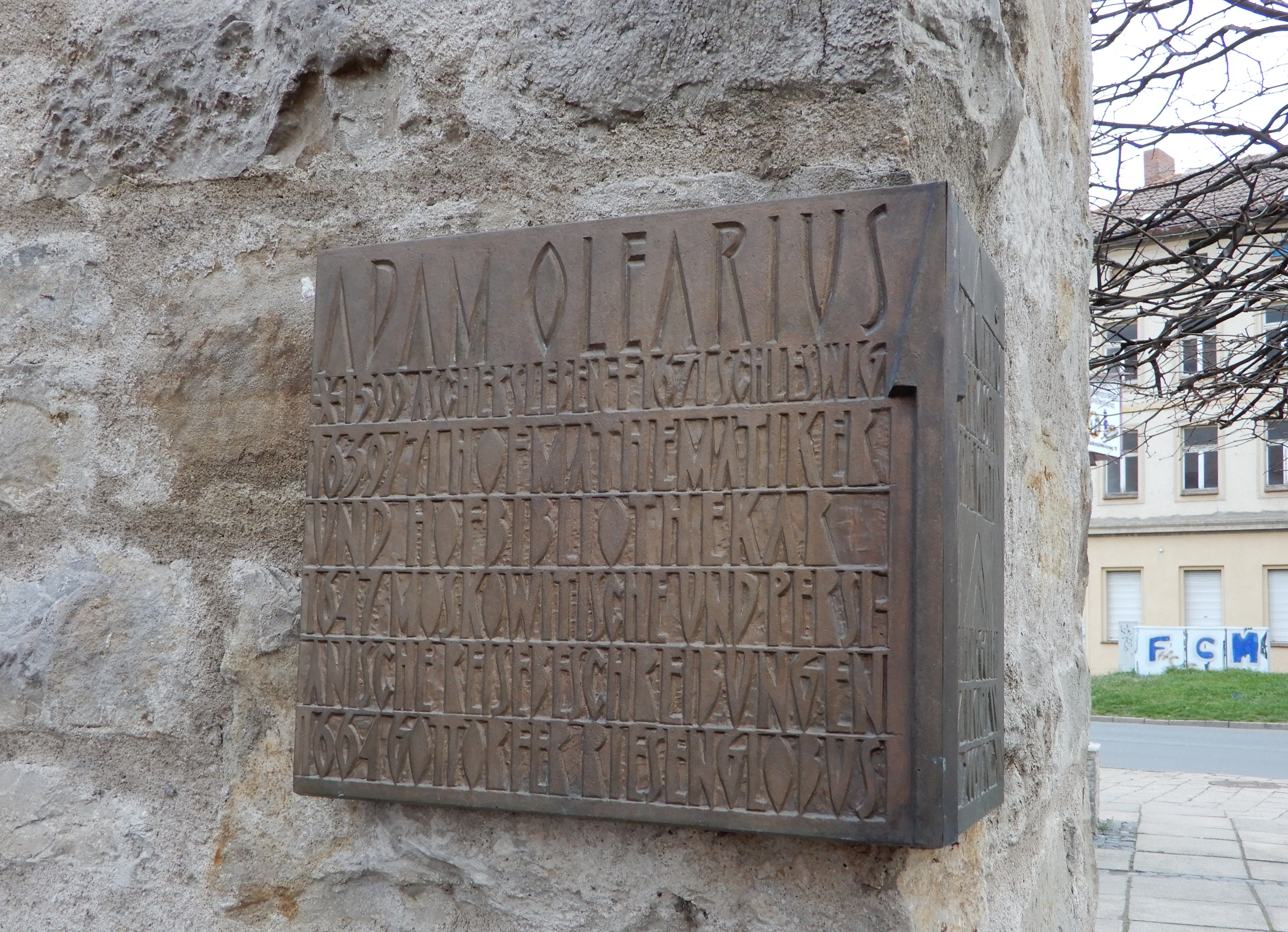
Brief biography of Olearius
- Adam Olearius (1599–1671), polymath, writer and diplomat. He travelled twice to Muscovy (Russian Tsardom), the second time on the way to Persia, and published his account of the voyage which became an important source of information for historians. He designed the world's largest model of the Earth — the Globe of Gottorf, which was given to the monarch of Russia and is exhibited in the first museum of Russia — Kunstkammer in St. Petersburg; the inner surface of the globe displays a map of starry sky and can be seen by people climbing in through a door. The Aschersleben monument to Olearius is a 2-meter-tall bronze statue of his on top of an extant fragment of the city wall next to the John's gate tower. Under the statue there is a bronze memorial plaque listing some points of his biography: years of birth and death, status of the court librarian and mathematician, years of travel account and making the Globe of Gottorf.
- Johann Esaias Silberschlag (1721–1791), theologian and scientist

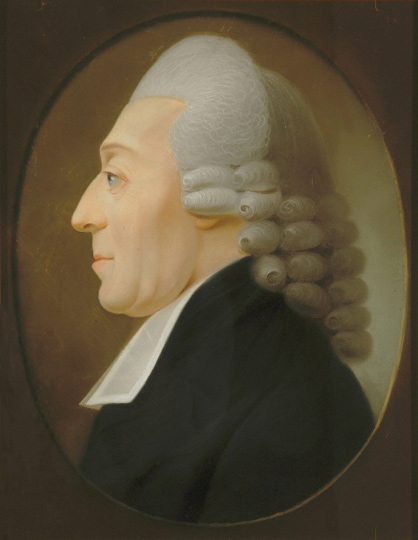
Johann August Ephraim Goeze c. 1780

- Johann August Ephraim Goeze (1731–1793), zoologist
- Franz Körte (1782–1845), natural and agricultural scientist
- Wilhelm Friedrich Wieprecht (1802–1872), composer
- Rudolf Christian Böttger (1806–1881), inorganic chemist
- Martin Schmidt (1863–1947), geologist and paleontologist
- Robert Leffler (1866–1940), actor and singer
- Anna Muthesius (1870–1961), fashion designer, singer and author
- Gerd von Rundstedt (1875–1953), World War II general, field marshal
- Richard Schoenfeld (1884–1956), sculptor and painter
- Theodor Osterkamp (1892–1975), Navy pilot in World War I, Luftwaffe Commodore in World War II
- Walter Andreas Schwarz (1913–1992), singer, writer, comedian, radio playwright and translator
- Lilo Ramdohr (1913–2013), member of the anti-fascist group White Rose
- Ernst Klodwig (1903–1973), Formula 1 driver
- Helmut Stein (born 1942), footballer
- Hugo Sasse (born 2004), racing driver

Wendell Lewis Willkie (1892–1944) was the Republican Party (GOP) nominee for the 1940 presidential election. Born Lewis Wendell Willkie in Elwood, Indiana, he was the son of Herman Willkie, a German immigrant from Aschersleben.

== Gallery ==
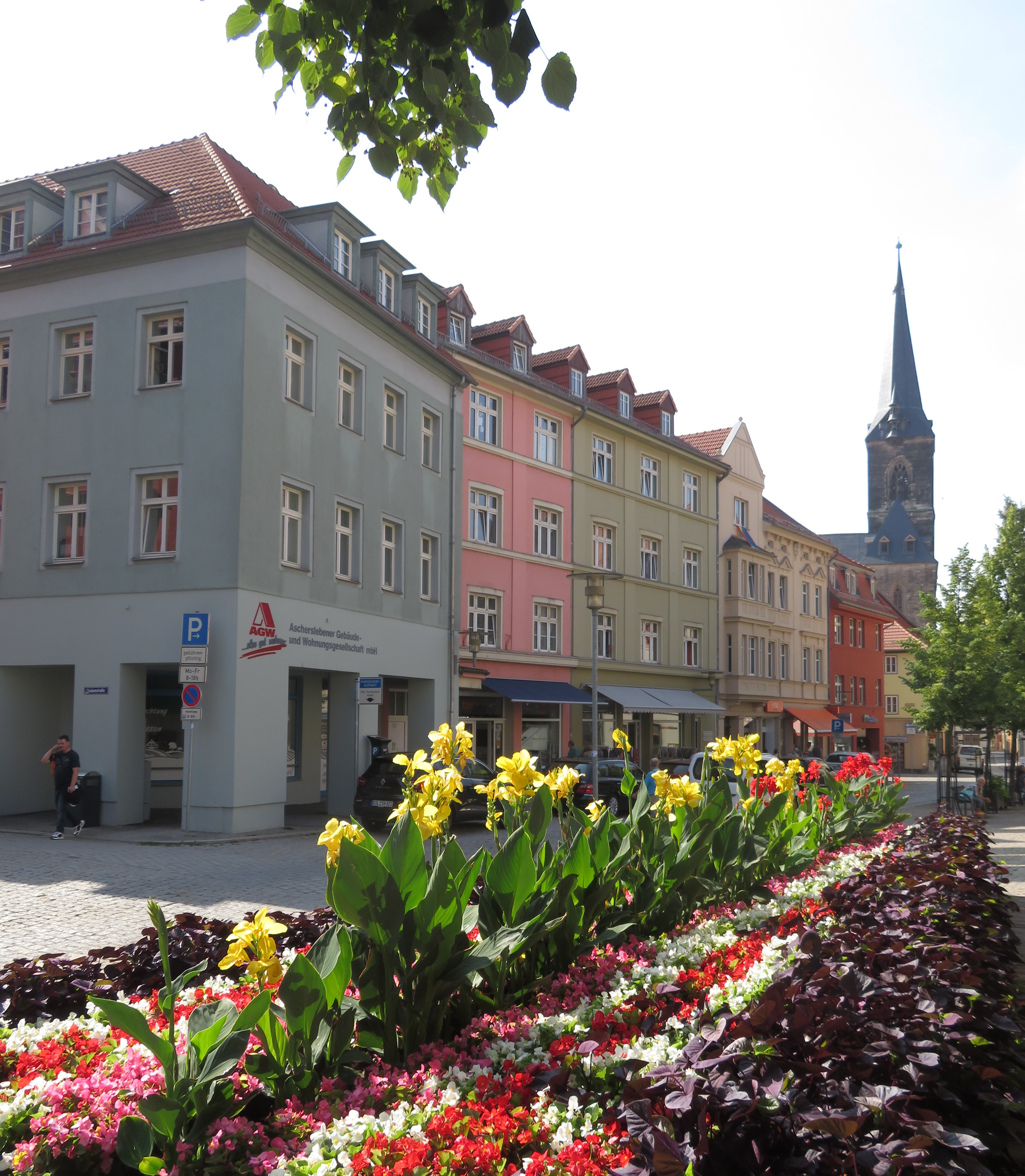
Market Place, St. Stephani Church

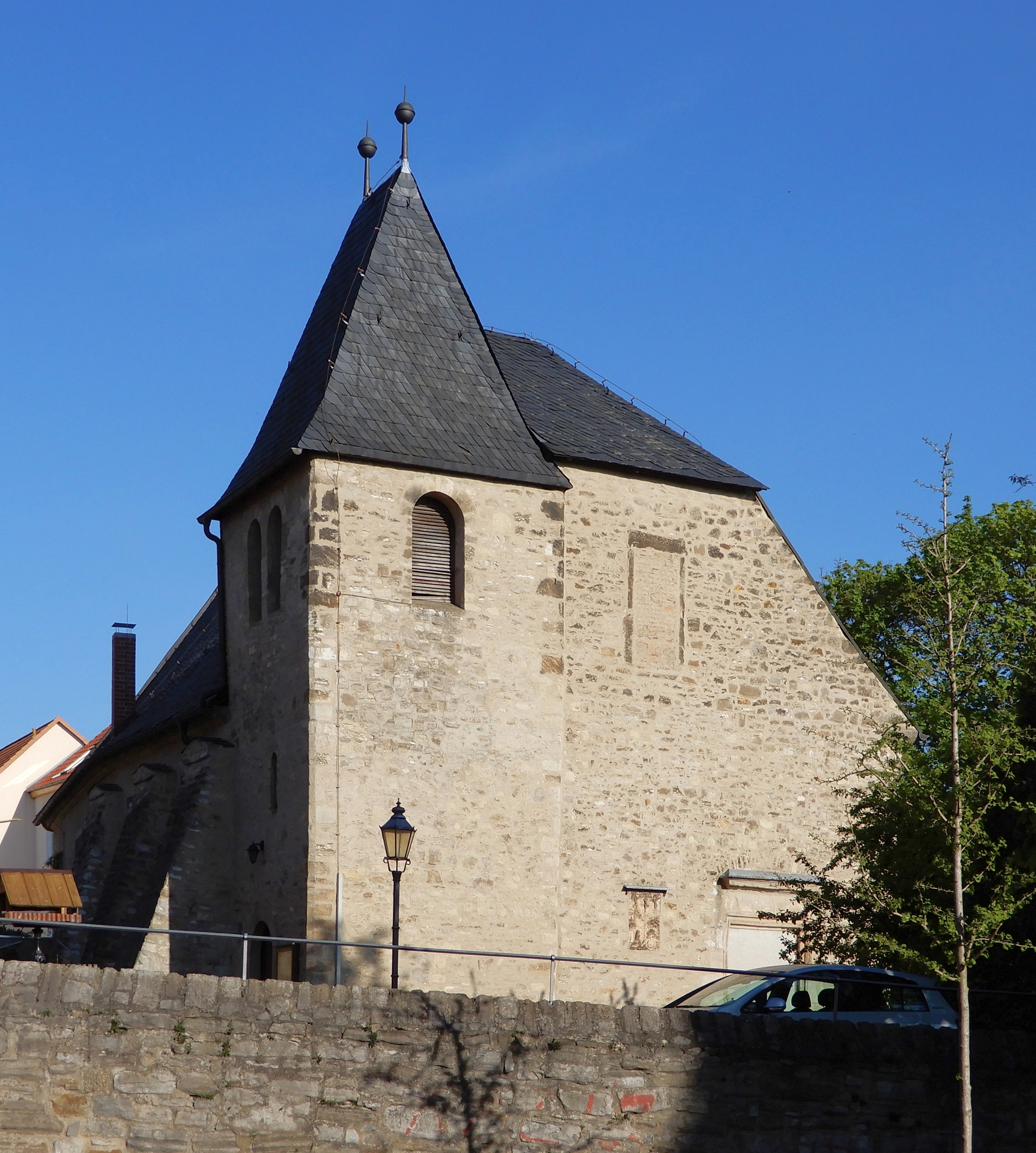
St. Margarethen Church

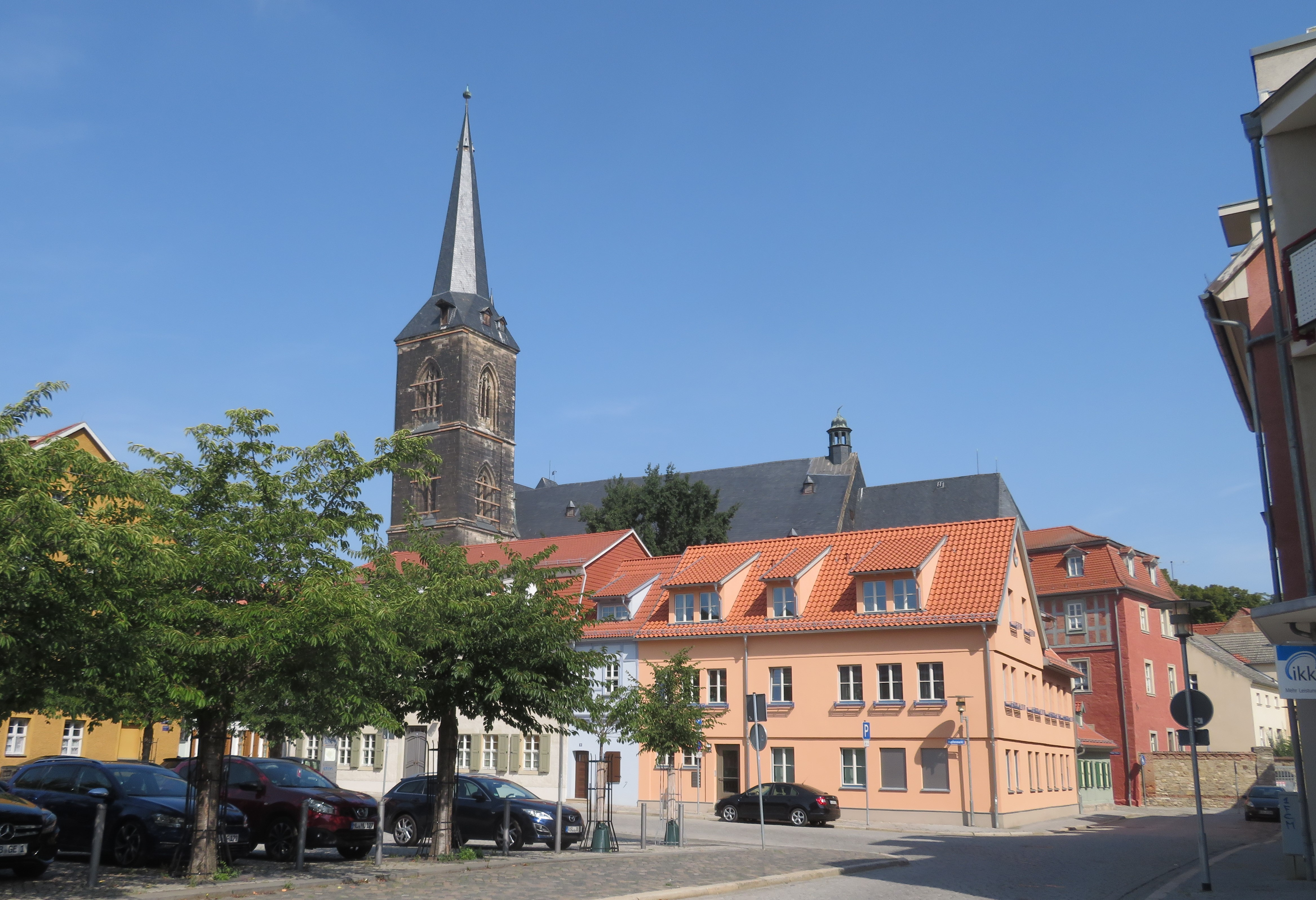
Former Hop Market

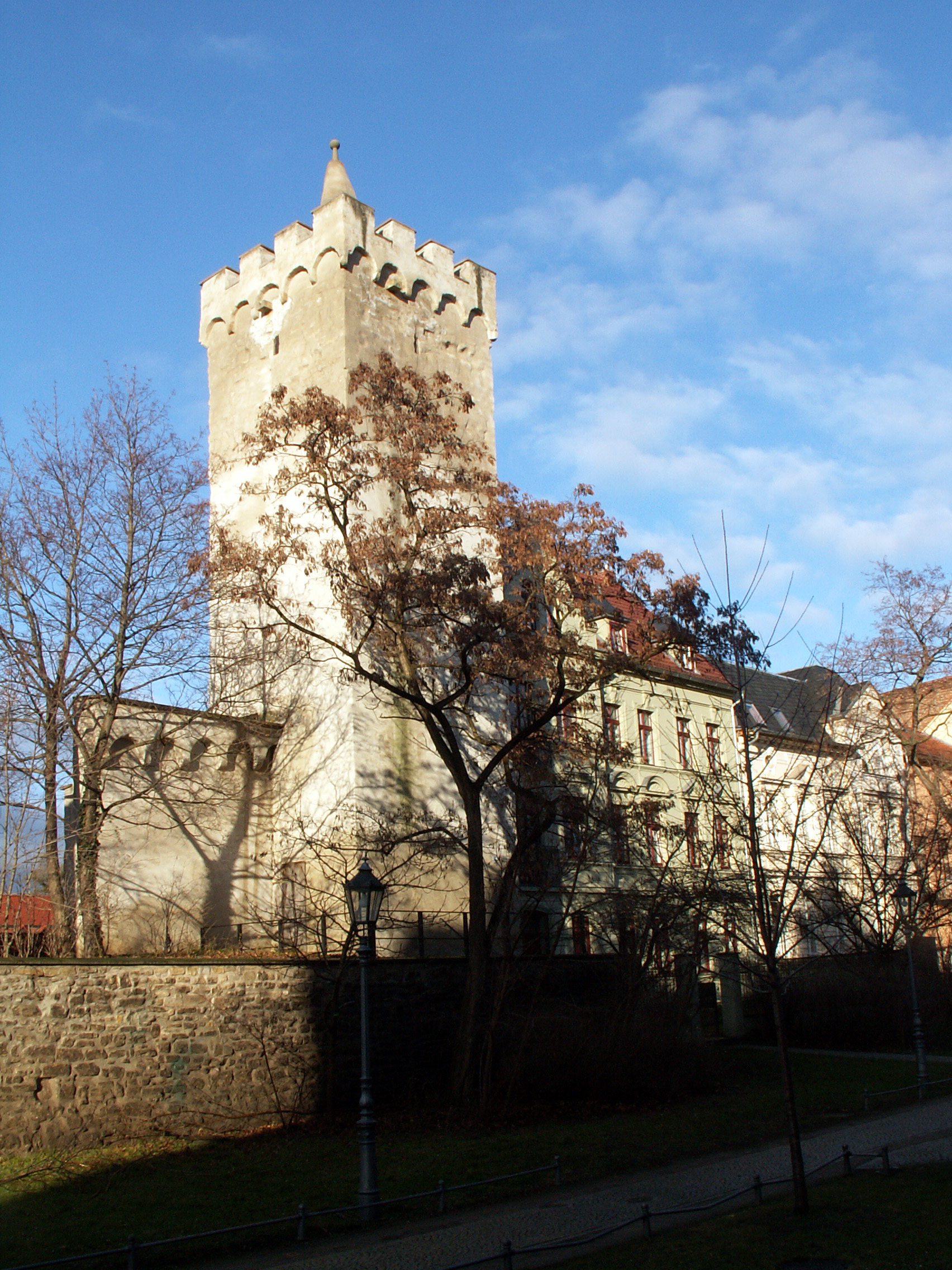
Marsfeld watchtower

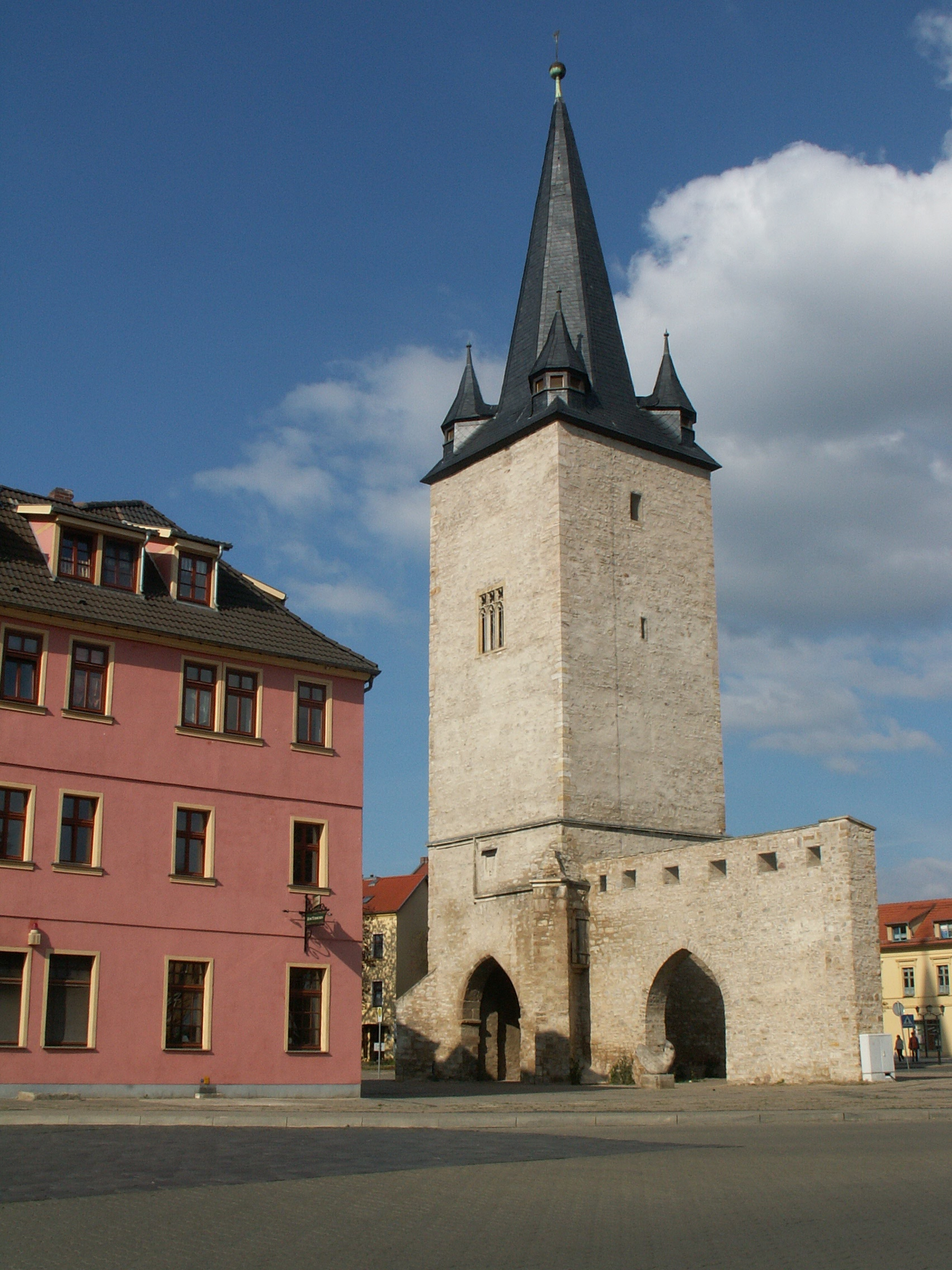
Johannisturm

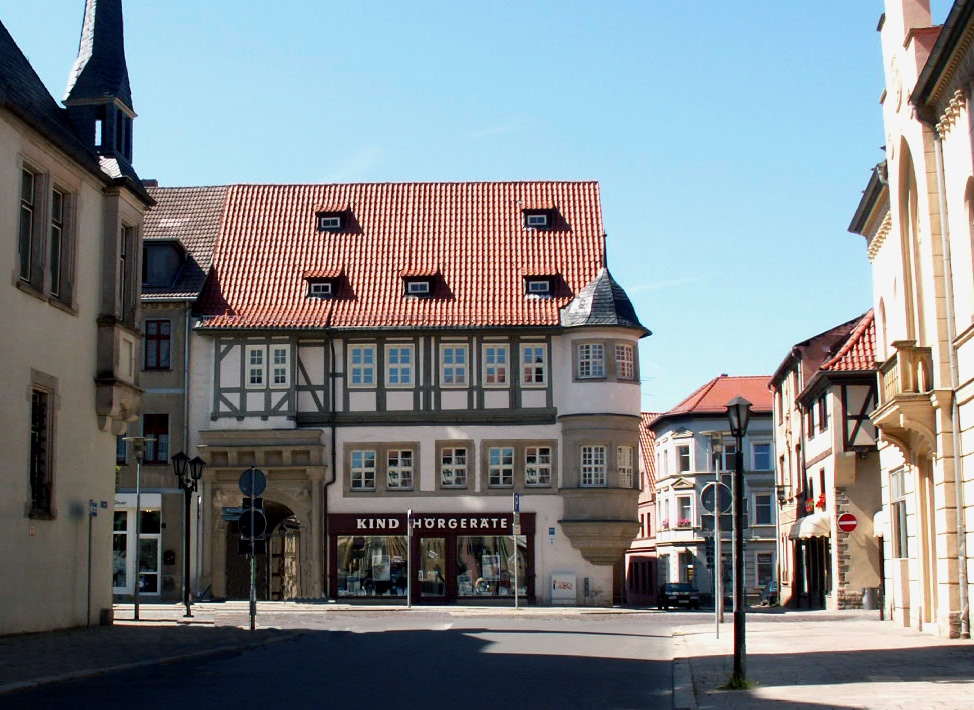
Krukmannsches Haus

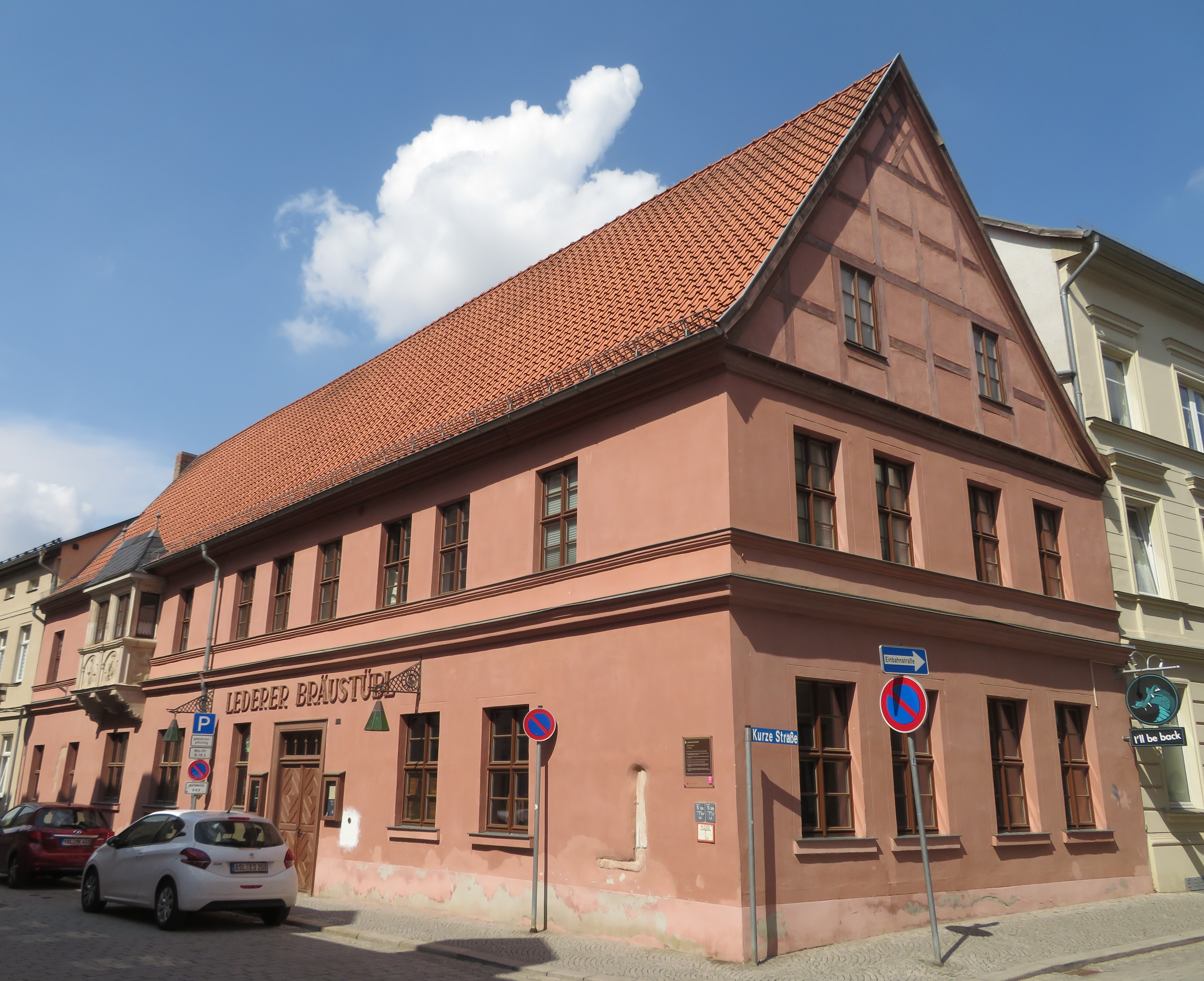
Lederer Bräustübl House

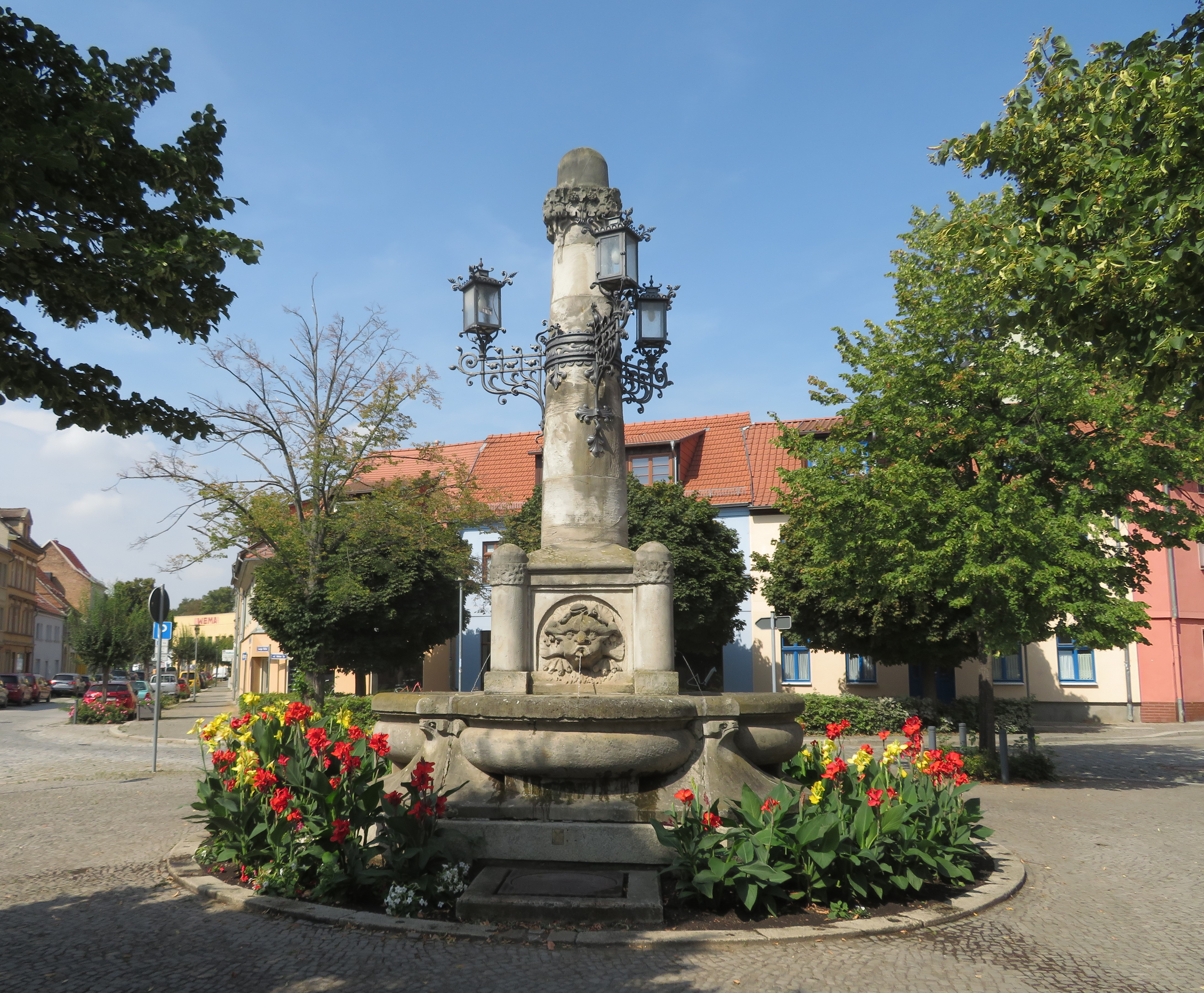
Fountain Kuntzebrunnen

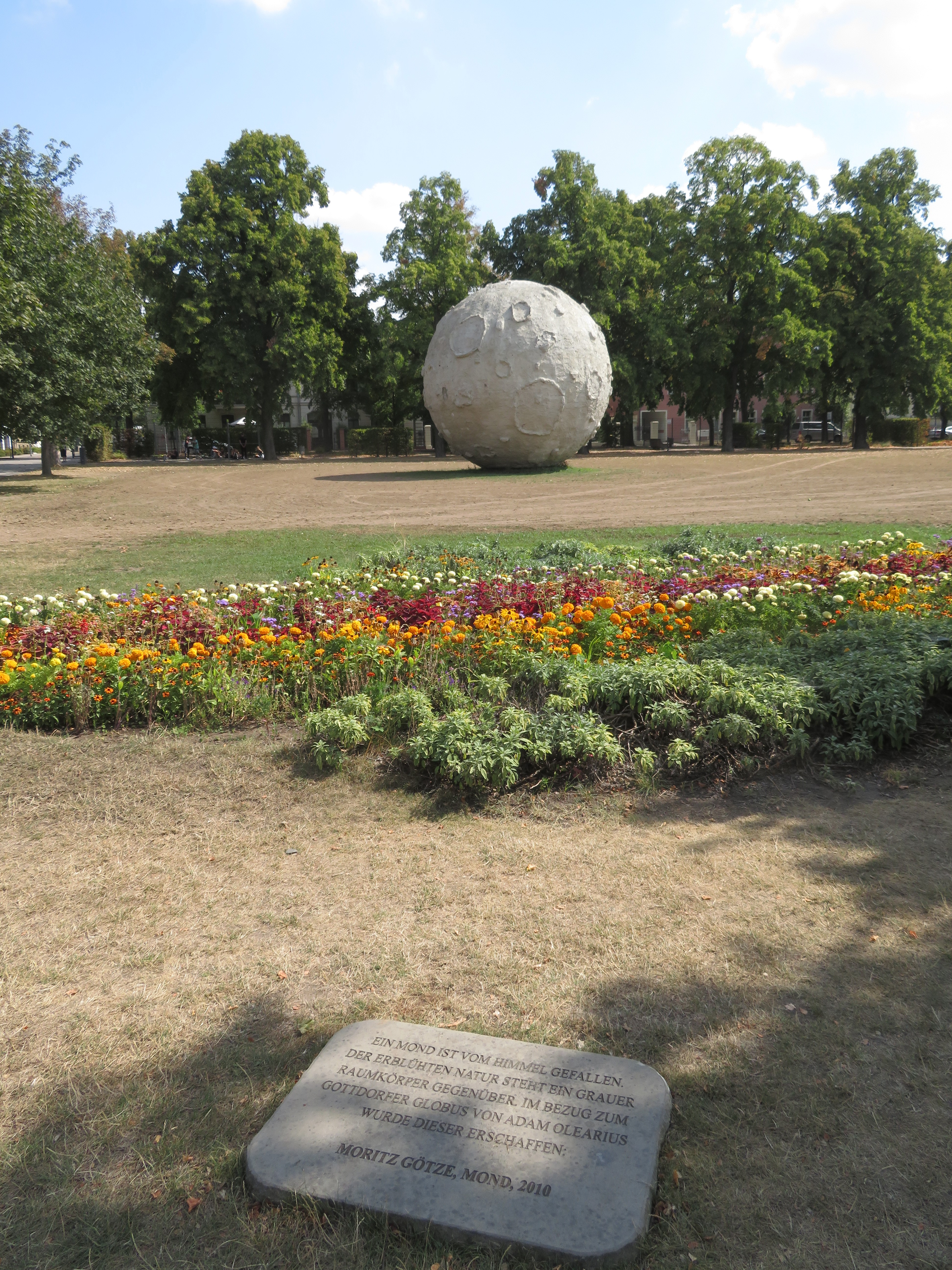
Moon Sculpture in Herrenbreite Park
