= The Dance of Love and Happiness =

1921 film

- Directed by: Willy Zeyn
- Written by: Armin Petersen; Willy Zeyn
- Starring: Werner Krauss; Olga Limburg; Hugo Flink
- Cinematography: Johannes Männling
- Production company: Gewa-Filmverleih
- Release date: 13 October 1921
- Country: Germany
- Languages: Silent; German intertitles

The Dance of Love and Happiness (German: Der Tanz um Liebe und Glück) is a 1921 German silent film directed by Willy Zeyn and starring Werner Krauss, Olga Limburg and Hugo Flink. It premiered at the Marmorhaus in Berlin.

The film's sets were designed by the art director Franz Schroedter.

== Cast ==
- Werner Krauss as Direktor Mac Sullivan
- Olga Limburg as Gladys
- Hugo Flink as Harry Gordon
- Elisabeth Grube as Sibyll
- Fritz Beckmann as Direktor des Varieté Fledermaus
- Karl Harbacher as Gordons Diener
- Gerhard Ritterband
- Danny Guertler
- Erna Offeney
- Emmy Sturm
- Marie Voigtsberger
- Ballett Erna Offeney

== Bibliography ==
- Bock, Hans-Michael & Bergfelder, Tim. The Concise CineGraph. Encyclopedia of German Cinema. Berghahn Books, 2009.
