= Bismarck (1914 film) =

1914 film

- Directed by: Richard Schott; Gustav Trautschold; William Wauer
- Written by: Richard Schott
- Starring: Franz Ludwig
- Cinematography: Paul Adler
- Music by: Ferdinand Hummel
- Production company: Eiko Film
- Release date: 7 February 1914
- Country: Germany
- Languages: Silent; German intertitles

Bismarck is a 1914 German silent historical film directed by Richard Schott, Gustav Trautschold and William Wauer and starring Franz Ludwig. It portrays the life of the German Chancellor Otto Von Bismarck.

== Cast ==
- Anna Ludwig
- Franz Ludwig as Bismarck
- Paul Passarge
- Hanni Reinwald

== Bibliography ==
- Warstat, Dieter Helmuth (1982). Frühes Kino der Kleinstadt. Berlin: Volker Spiess. ISBN 978-3-88435-076-8.
