= Hertha Guthmar =

German actress (1904–2003)

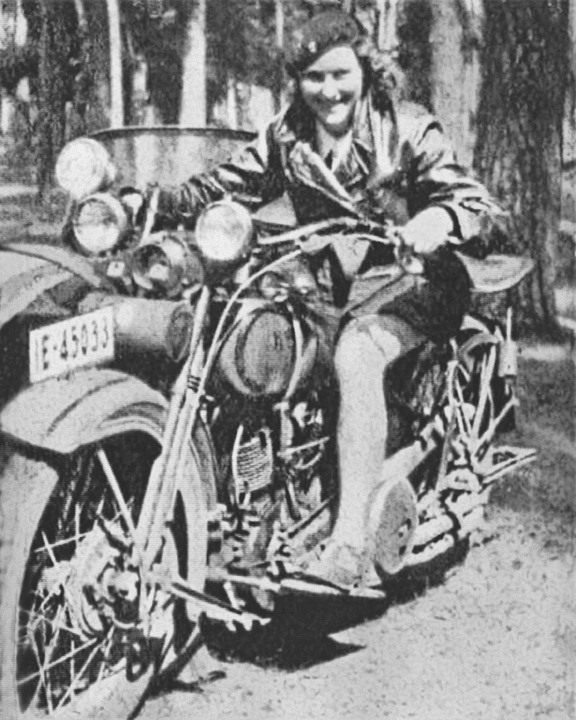
- Guthmar in 1930
- Born: 13 December 1904; Tiel, Netherlands
- Died: 13 January 2003 (aged 98); Leopoldshöhe, Germany
- Occupation: Actress
- Years active: 1929–1936 (film)

Hertha Guthmar (13 December 1904 – 13 January 2003) was a German film actress of the 1930s.

== Selected filmography ==
- Roses Bloom on the Moorland (1929)
- Ariane (1931)
- The Mad Bomberg (1932)
- Ways to a Good Marriage (1933)
- A Woman with Power of Attorney (1934)
- The Hour of Temptation (1936)

== Bibliography ==
- Lotte H. Eisner. The Haunted Screen: Expressionism in the German Cinema and the Influence of Max Reinhardt. University of California Press, 2008.
