= Schackstedt =

- Stadtteil of Aschersleben
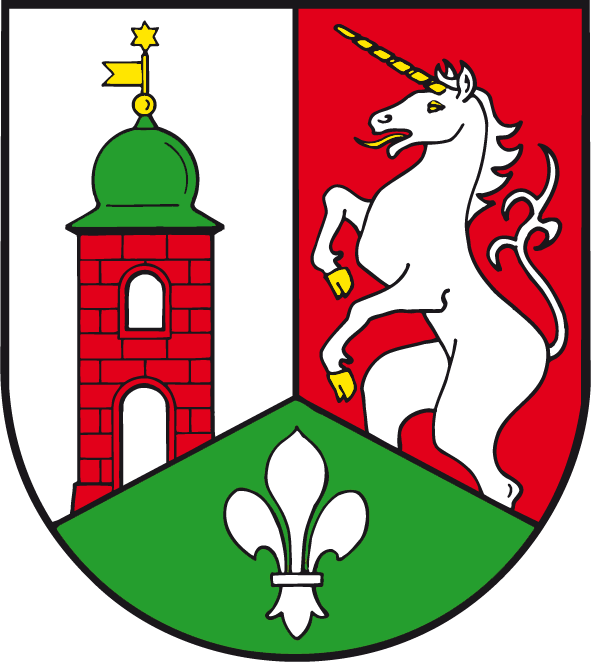
- Coat of arms
- Interactive map of Schackstedt
- Location within Germany Location within Saxony-Anhalt
- Coordinates: 51°43′N 11°37′E
- Country: Germany
- State: Saxony-Anhalt
- District: Salzlandkreis
- Town: Aschersleben

Area
  - Total: 9.18 km^{2} (3.54 sq mi)
- Elevation: 137 m (449 ft)

Population (2006-12-31)
  - Total: 437
  - Density: 47.6/km^{2} (123/sq mi)
- Time zone: UTC+01:00 (CET)
  - Summer (DST): UTC+02:00 (CEST)
- Postal codes: 06425
- Dialling codes: 034692

Schackstedt is a village and a former municipality in the district Salzlandkreis, in Saxony-Anhalt, Germany.

Since 1 January 2010, it is part of the town Aschersleben.
