= Drohndorf =

Coordinates: 51°43′N 11°32′E

Location of Drohndorf in the municipality Aschersleben in Salzlandkreis in Saxony-Anhalt, Germany.

Drohndorf is a former municipality in the district of Salzlandkreis, in Saxony-Anhalt, Germany. Since 1 January 2008, it is part of the town Aschersleben.

== See also ==
- Freckleben
- Mehringen
