= Heinrich Peer =

Austrian actor

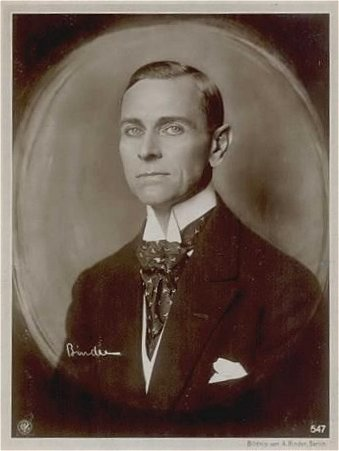
- Peer, ca. 1920
- Born: 25 November 1867; Vienna, Austro-Hungarian Empire
- Died: 13 May 1927 (aged 59); Vienna, Austria
- Occupation: Actor
- Years active: 1911–1927 (film)

Heinrich Peer (25 November 1867 – 13 May 1927) was an Austrian stage and film actor. He appeared in around a hundred films during the silent era.

== Selected filmography ==
- Where Is Coletti? (1913)
- The Blue Mouse (1913)
- The Love of Hetty Raimond (1917)
- Carmen (1918)
- The Beggar Countess (1918)
- Midnight (1918)
- The Gambler (1919)
- The Face Removed (1920)
- The Law of the Desert (1920)
- The Princess of the Nile (1920)
- Eternal River (1920)
- The Night at Goldenhall (1920)
- Demon Blood (1920)
- Fanny Elssler (1920)
- Count Varenne's Lover (1921)
- Off the Rails (1921)
- Parisian Women (1921)
- The Convict of Cayenne (1921)
- The Railway King (1921)
- Tania, the Woman in Chains (1922)
- Maciste and the Silver King's Daughter (1922)
- Count Festenberg (1922)
- Two Worlds (1922)
- Prashna's Secret (1922)
- Circus People (1922)
- The Lady and Her Hairdresser (1922)
- Fräulein Raffke (1923)
- Zaida, the Tragedy of a Model (1923)
- The Evangelist (1924)
- Garragan (1924)
- Heart of Stone (1924)
- The Venus of Montmartre (1925)
- Bismarck (1925)
- People in Need (1925)
- The Old Ballroom (1925)
- The Master of Death (1926)
- The Bohemian Dancer (1926)
- Lace (1926)
- The Black Pierrot (1926)
- Lace (1926)
- The Mill at Sanssouci (1926)
- Bismarck 1862–1898 (1927)
- The Gypsy Baron (1927)

== Bibliography ==
- Hardt, Ursula. From Caligari to California: Erich Pommer's life in the International Film Wars. Berghahn Books, 1996.
