= The Harbour Bride =

1927 film

- Directed by: Wolfgang Neff
- Written by: Ludwig Hamburger
- Starring: John Mylong; Olga Engl; Robert Leffler
- Cinematography: Willy Winterstein
- Production company: Deutsche Vereins-Film
- Release date: 2 August 1927
- Country: Germany
- Languages: Silent; German intertitles

The Harbour Bride (German: Die Hafenbraut) is a 1927 German silent drama film directed by Wolfgang Neff and starring John Mylong, Olga Engl and Robert Leffler.

The film's sets were designed by the art director Artur Günther.

== Cast ==
- Alice Kempen
- John Mylong
- Olga Engl
- Robert Leffler
- Bobbie Bender

== Bibliography ==
- Alfred Krautz. International directory of cinematographers, set- and costume designers in film, Volume 4. Saur, 1984.
