= Anna Müller-Lincke =

German actress

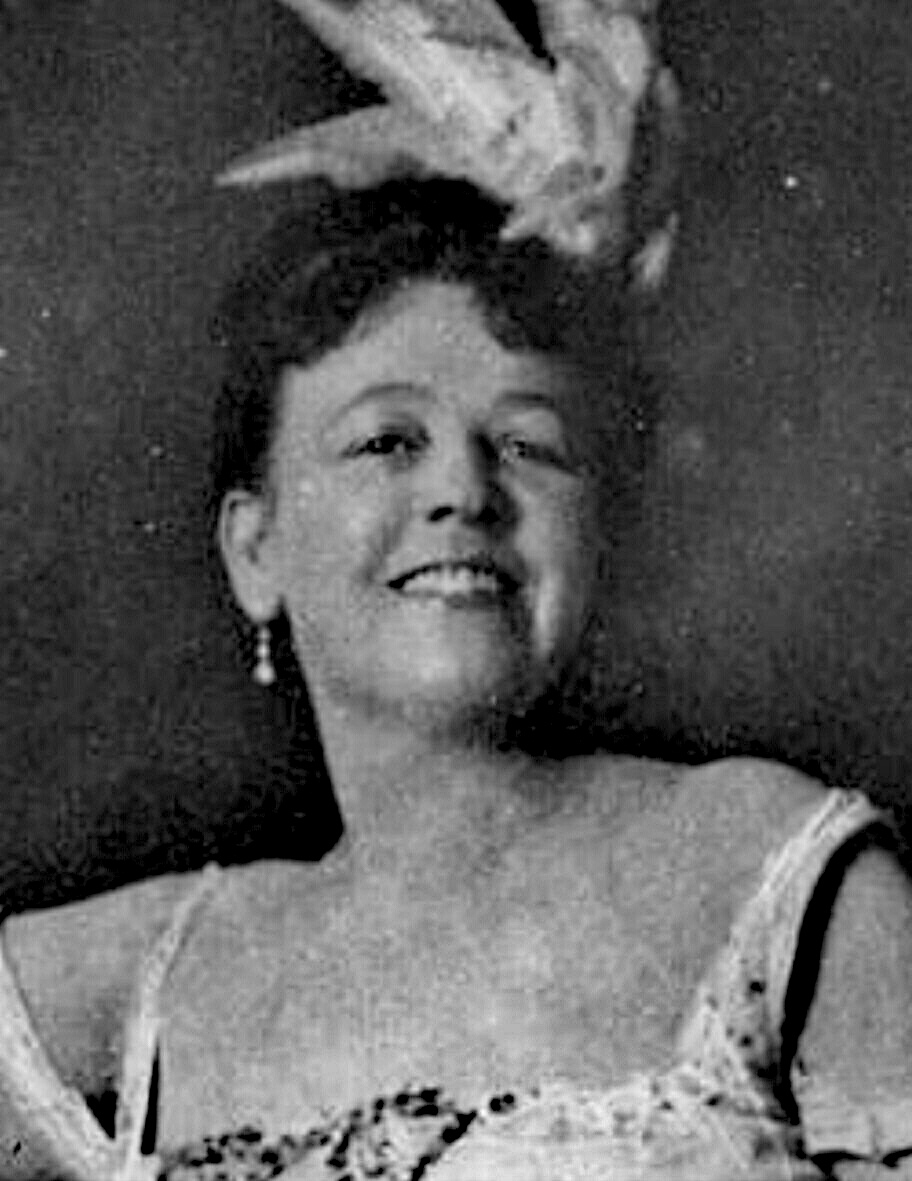
- Anna Müller-Lincke in 1929.
- Born: Anna Waldmüller; 8 April 1869; Berlin, Kingdom of Prussia
- Died: 24 January 1935 (aged 65); Berlin, Germany
- Occupations: actress, singer
- Years active: 1913–1935

Anna Müller-Lincke (8 April 1869 – 24 January 1935) was a German stage and film actress and soubrette.

== Selected filmography ==
- Where Is Coletti? (1913)
- The Firm Gets Married (1914)
- The New Paradise (1921)
- Den of Iniquity (1925)
- What a Woman Dreams of in Springtime (1929)
- Roses Bloom on the Moorland (1929)
- Come Back, All Is Forgiven (1929)
- Rag Ball (1930)
- Oh Those Glorious Old Student Days (1930)
- Marriage in Name Only (1930)
- The Great Longing (1930)
- The Blonde Nightingale (1930)
- The Daredevil (1931)
- My Leopold (1931)
- The True Jacob (1931)
- Berlin-Alexanderplatz (1931).
- Hitlerjunge Quex (1933)
- Love Must Be Understood (1933)
- The Daring Swimmer (1934)
- What Am I Without You (1934)
- Between Two Hearts (1934)
- Everything for a Woman (1935)

== Bibliography ==
- Elsaesser, Thomas; Wedel, Michael, eds. (1996). A Second Life: German Cinema's First Decades. Amsterdam: Amsterdam University Press. ISBN 978-90-5356-172-0.
