= Wolfgang von Schwind =

Austrian actor, singer (1879–1949)

- Born: 4 July 1879; Elbogen, Austria-Hungary
- Died: 19 April 1949 (aged 69); Vienna, Austria
- Occupation: Actor
- Years active: 1920–1947

Wolfgang von Schwind also spelled Wolfgang von Schwindt (4 July 1879 – 19 April 1949) was an Austrian actor and opera singer. He was born in Elbogen, Austria, and died in Vienna. His career started as an operatic bass at the Royal Opera Berlin and the Court Theatre Karlsruhe.

Starting in 1920, von Schwind appeared in more than eighty films until 1947. He was the grandson of Austrian painter Moritz von Schwind.

== Selected filmography ==
| Year | Title |
|---|---|
| 1920 | Der Henker von Sankt Marien |
| 1921 | At War in the Diamond Fields |
| 1922 | The Prey of the Furies |
| 1922 | Nathan the Wise |
| 1924 | Love Is the Power of Women |
| 1924 | The Wonderful Adventure |
| 1925 | Bismarck |
| 1927 | The Long Intermission |
| 1927 | Bismarck 1862–1898 |
| 1927 | His Greatest Bluff |
| 1927 | Doña Juana |
| 1928 | Polish Economy |
| 1928 | Theatre |
| 1928 | The Beaver Coat |
| 1929 | The Diva |
| 1929 | Taxi at Midnight |
| 1930 | Das Kabinett des Dr. Larifari |
| 1930 | Mischievous Miss |
| 1930 | The Jumping Jack |
| 1931 | Ronny |
| 1931 | 1914 |
| 1932 | Johnny Steals Europe |
| 1932 | No Money Needed |
| 1932 | Theodor Körner |
| 1934 | A Woman with Power of Attorney |
| 1934 | Paganini |
| 1935 | Peter, Paul and Nanette |
| 1935 | All Because of the Dog |
| 1936 | Augustus the Strong |
| 1936 | The Merry Wives |
| 1938 | Nanon |
| 1939 | The Life and Loves of Tschaikovsky |
| 1940 | Die Glücksmühle |
