= Kurt Blachy =

German actor, director

- Born: 19 July 1897; Upper Silesia, German Empire
- Died: 15 October 1980 (aged 83); Hamburg, West Germany
- Other name: Curt Blachnitzky
- Occupations: Actor, director
- Years active: 1923–1975 (film & TV)

Kurt Blachy (1897–1980) was a German actor and film director.

== Selected filmography ==
- Bismarck 1862–1898 (1927)
- What a Woman Dreams of in Springtime (1929)
- Death Drive for the World Record (1929)
- Roses Bloom on the Moorland (1929)

== Bibliography ==
- Kasten, Jürgen; Bruns, Brigitte (2005). Erna Morena. Munich: Belleville. ISBN 978-3-936298-52-9.
