= Schackenthal =

- Stadtteil of Aschersleben
- Interactive map of Schackenthal
- Location within Germany Location within Saxony-Anhalt
- Coordinates: 51°44′18″N 11°35′25″E
- Country: Germany
- State: Saxony-Anhalt
- District: Salzlandkreis
- Town: Aschersleben

Area
  - Total: 6.97 km^{2} (2.69 sq mi)
- Elevation: 122 m (400 ft)

Population (2006-12-31)
  - Total: 335
  - Density: 48.1/km^{2} (124/sq mi)
- Time zone: UTC+01:00 (CET)
  - Summer (DST): UTC+02:00 (CEST)
- Postal codes: 06449
- Dialling codes: 034746
- Vehicle registration: SLK
- Website: www.aschersleben.de

Schackenthal is a village and a former municipality in the district of Salzlandkreis, in Saxony-Anhalt, Germany. Since 1 January 2009, it is part of the town Aschersleben.
