= Willy Zeyn (director) =

German film director and screenwriter

- Born: 30 June 1876; Hamburg, German Empire
- Died: 9 August 1946 (aged 70); Munich, Allied-occupied Germany
- Occupations: Director, Screenwriter
- Years active: 1911-1924 (film)

Willy Zeyn (1876-1946) was a German film director and screenwriter of the silent era. His son Willy Zeyn became a film editor and producer.

== Selected filmography ==
- The Gambler (1919)
- The Hound of the Baskervilles (1920) aka Der Hund von Baskerville
- The Dance of Love and Happiness (1921)
- The New Paradise (1921)
- The Passenger in Compartment Seven (1922)

== Bibliography ==
- Thomas Elsaesser & Michael Wedel. A Second Life: German Cinema's First Decades.
