= Max Mack =

German film personality (1884–1973)

- Born: 2 October 1884; Halberstadt, Province of Saxony, German Empire
- Died: 18 February 1973 (aged 88); London, England, United Kingdom
- Other name: Moritz Myrthenzweig
- Occupations: screenwriter, actor, producer, director
- Years active: 1910 - 1935

Max Mack (1884–1973) was a German screenwriter, film producer and director during the silent era. He is particularly known for his 1913 film The Other. He directed, and co-starred in, an early film adaptation of Dr. Jekyll and Mr. Hyde in 1914, called Ein Seltsamer Fall, written by Richard Oswald. During the 1910s, he directed nearly a hundred films in a variety of different genres.

Born as Moritz Myrthenzweig in Halberstadt, the Jewish Mack was later forced to emigrate to escape Nazism, and settled in the United Kingdom. His final film was the 1935 quota quickie Be Careful, Mr. Smith.

== Selected filmography ==
=== Director ===
- The Other (1913)
- The Blue Mouse (1913)
- Where Is Coletti? (1913)
- A World Without Men (1914)
- Ein Seltsamer Fall (1914) A film adaptation of Dr. Jekyll and Mr. Hyde
- Robert and Bertram (1915)
- Adamants letztes Rennen (1916)
- The Confessions of the Green Mask (1916)
- The Maharaja's Favourite Wife (1921)
- Quarantäne (1923)
- The Beautiful Girl (1923)
- Father Voss (1925)
- The Uninvited Guest (1925)
- The Girl with a Patron (1925)
- The Wooing of Eve (1926)
- Fight of the Tertia (1929)
- Only on the Rhine (1930)
- A Thousand for One Night (1933)
- Be Careful, Mr. Smith (1935)

=== Actor ===
- Japanisches Opfer (1910) – Der Edelmütige
- Die Pulvermühle (1910)
- Dienertreue (1911)
- Ihr Jugendfreund (1911)
- Madame Potiphar (1911)
- Die Ballhaus-Anna (1911)
- Opfer der Untreue (1911)
- Gehirnreflexe (1911)
- Coeur-As (1912)
- Dämon Eifersucht (1912) – Max
- Das Bild der Mutter (1912) – Max
- Ein Kampf im Feuer (1912) – Egon
- Das Ende vom Liede (1912)
- Ein seltsamer Fall (1914) – Selbst / Himself
- Hans und Hanni (1915)
- Der Sturz des Hauses Macwell (1918)
- You Belong to Me (1934) – Jack Mandel (final film role)

== Bibliography ==
- Elsaesser, Thomas & Wedel, Michael. A Second Life: German Cinema's First Decades. Amsterdam University Press, 1996.
- Ragowski, Christian. The Many Faces of Weimar Cinema: Rediscovering Germany's Filmic Legacy. Camden House, 2010.
