= The Blue Mouse (1913 film) =

1913 film directed by Max Mack

- German: Die blaue Maus
- Directed by: Max Mack
- Written by: Alexander Engel (play); Julius Horst (play)
- Produced by: Jules Greenbaum
- Starring: Madge Lessing; Otto Treptow; Heinrich Peer
- Cinematography: Hermann Boettger
- Production company: Greenbaum-Film
- Release date: 3 October 1913
- Country: Germany
- Languages: Silent; German intertitles

The Blue Mouse (German: Die blaue Maus) is a 1913 German silent comedy film directed by Max Mack and starring Madge Lessing, Otto Treptow and Heinrich Peer. It was a major commercial success in Germany, and was also distributed in the United States.

The film's sets were designed by Hermann Warm.

== Cast ==
- Madge Lessing as Fritzi Lustig
- Otto Treptow as Cäsar Meier
- Heinrich Peer as Director Bock
- Else Wannovius as Clara Brummer
- Herbert Paulmüller
- Willy Lengling
- Martha Hoffmann
- Willi Schaeffers
