= What a Woman Dreams of in Springtime (1929 film) =

1929 film

- Directed by: Curt Blachnitzky
- Written by: Walter Kollo; Hans Vietzke; Curt Blachnitzky
- Produced by: Arthur Ziehm
- Starring: Paul Rehkopf; Anna Müller-Lincke; Colette Brettel; Kurt Vespermann
- Cinematography: Georg Muschner
- Production company: Arthur Ziehm Film
- Distributed by: International Film-Exchange
- Release date: March 1929
- Country: Germany
- Languages: Silent; German intertitles

What a Woman Dreams of in Springtime (German: Was eine Frau im Frühling träumt) is a 1929 German silent comedy film directed by Curt Blachnitzky and starring Paul Rehkopf, Anna Müller-Lincke and Colette Brettel. The film's art direction was by Kurt Richter.

== Cast ==
- Paul Rehkopf as August Wohlfahrt, Gerichtsvollzieher
- Anna Müller-Lincke as Amalia Wohlfahrt, seine Frau
- Colette Brettel as Lotte Wohlfahrt, beider Tochter
- Kurt Vespermann as Max Müller, Bücherreisender
- Julius Falkenstein as Josef Columbus, Direktor der Fantasia-Film
- Colette Darfeuil as Ilona Lundt, seine Stars
- Ernst Rückert as Peter Alsen, sein Star
- Ernst Winar as Tom Braun, Film-Regisseur
- Karl Harbacher
- Hugo Döblin
- Ludwig Sachs
- Heinrich Gotho
- Harry Grunwald
- Trude Lehmann
- Max Maximilian

== Bibliography ==
- Prawer, S.S. Between Two Worlds: The Jewish Presence in German and Austrian Film, 1910-1933. Berghahn Books, 2005.
