= Groß Schierstedt =

- Stadtteil of Aschersleben
- Interactive map of Groß Schierstedt
- Location within Germany Location within Saxony-Anhalt
- Coordinates: 51°44′55″N 11°31′24″E
- Country: Germany
- State: Saxony-Anhalt
- District: Salzlandkreis
- Town: Aschersleben

Area
  - Total: 6.25 km^{2} (2.41 sq mi)
- Elevation: 129 m (423 ft)

Population (2006-12-31)
  - Total: 630
  - Density: 100/km^{2} (260/sq mi)
- Time zone: UTC+01:00 (CET)
  - Summer (DST): UTC+02:00 (CEST)
- Postal codes: 06449
- Dialling codes: 03473
- Vehicle registration: SLK
- Website: www.aschersleben.de

Groß Schierstedt is a village and a former municipality in the district of Salzlandkreis, in Saxony-Anhalt, Germany. Since 1 January 2009, it is part of the town Aschersleben.
