= Where Is Coletti? =

1913 German silent comedy film

- German: Wo ist Coletti?
- Directed by: Max Mack
- Written by: Franz von Schönthan
- Produced by: Jules Greenbaum
- Starring: Hans Junkermann; Madge Lessing; Heinrich Peer
- Cinematography: Hermann Boettger
- Production company: Deutsche Vitascope
- Release date: 4 April 1913
- Running time: 86 minutes
- Country: Germany
- Languages: Silent; German intertitles

Where Is Coletti? (German: Wo ist Coletti?) is a 1913 German silent comedy film directed by Max Mack and starring Hans Junkermann, Madge Lessing, and Heinrich Peer. It was a major commercial hit on its release.

The film's sets were designed by Hermann Warm.

== Cast ==
- Hans Junkermann as Jean Coletti
- Madge Lessing as Lolotte
- Heinrich Peer as Anton
- Anna Müller-Lincke as Resolute Dame
- Hans Stock as Count Edgar
- Max Laurence as old Count
- Axel Breidahl
