= A Song Goes Round the World =

A Song Goes Round the World may refer to:

- A Song Goes Round the World (1933 film), a German drama film
- A Song Goes Round the World (1958 film), a West German musical film
