= Viktor Schwanneke =

German actor

- Born: Victor Eduard Julius Schwanneke; 8 February 1880; Hedwigsburg, Kissenbrück, Wolfenbüttel, Lower Saxony, Germany
- Died: 7 June 1931 (aged 51); Berlin, Germany
- Other names: Viktor Schwannecke; Viktor Schwanneke-Willberg; Viktor von Schwannecke
- Occupation: Actor
- Years active: 1903–1931
- Children: Ellen Schwanneke

Viktor Eduard Julius Schwanneke (8 February 1880 – 7 June 1931) was a German stage director and actor, writer, and film actor whose acting career began at the turn of the 20th century.

== Early life ==
Viktor Schwanneke was born in the small village of Hedwigsburg in the municipal bounds of Kissenbrück, in the district of Wolfenbüttel, Lower Saxony and began his career as a bank clerk in Hanover, but shortly after the turn of the 20th century he began to pursue a career in acting. His first engagement was at a summer theatre in the fall of 1904, followed by a stint at a theatre in Rudolstadt. This was followed by theater commitments in Frankfurt and Stettin. In Stetten he appeared in a 1907-1908 stage production with Emil Jannings titled Seine Hoheit (English: His Highness), billed as Viktor Schwanneke-Willberg.

In 1908 he went to Munich where he held a position at the Bavarian State Theatre. There, he honed his skills as a comedian, best known for his roles as the theater director Striese in The Rape of the Sabine Women and in a popular production of William Shakespeare's Twelfth Night. In 1913 he coauthored a book with Paul L. Fuhrmann titled Dr. Fix: Bluff in 3 Aufz and from 1916 until 1918 he wrote a number of booklets celebrating the histories of various German theatres.

== Later career ==
In 1916 he was asked by director Maximilian Sladek to be a guest performer onstage in Berlin. Here he succeeded in the Robert Forster-Larrinaga penned comedy Der Floh im Panzerhaus: Schicksals-Groteske. When national unrest broke out during the German Revolution of 1918–1919 and the short-lived Bavarian Soviet Republic was created, Schwanneke was the interim director of the Bavarian State Theatre and State Opera.

In 1920 he settled permanently in Berlin and worked first as an actor and director at the 'Little Theatre' (German: Kleinen Schauspielhaus) in Charlottenburg. One of his greatest successes came late, shortly before his death, at Max Reinhardt's directorship in Der Schwierige, a comedy penned by Hugo von Hofmannsthal. One of his more noteworthy achievements was as a director of the Anton Dietzenschmidt penned play Vom Lieben Augustin in 1926 at the Volksbühne Theatre am Bülowplatz. The cast included actor Alexander Granach.

In addition to his theatre work, Schwanneke was also an active member of the actor's union and he committed himself the social concerns of his colleagues. He was also a member and served on the Board of the Cooperative German National Stage.

In the interwar period of the Weimar Republic he began a career in film. From 1922 until just before his death in 1931, he assumed a variety of character actor and supporting roles opposite such popular film actors of the era as Margarete Schön, Lya De Putti, Anny Ondra, Paul Bildt and Carl de Vogt.

From March 1922 until his death, he was the owner of the a wine bar on Rankestraße in Berlin. The bar became a popular meeting place for artists and film and theatre people. Schwanneke died in Berlin in 1931. His daughter was the actress Ellen Schwanneke, possibly best recalled for her role in the 1931 film Mädchen in Uniform.

== Filmography ==
- Der bekannte Unbekannte (1922), as Tom Bluff
- Marie Antoinette, the Love of a King (1922), as Ludwig XVI
- The Pilgrimage of Love (1923), as Oberlehrer Dr. Daniel Bornemann
- Demon Circus (1923)
- A Woman, an Animal, a Diamond (1923), as Bürgermeister
- Horrido (1924)
- The New Land (1924)
- Struggle for the Soil (1925), as Paul Großkopp
- Comedians (1925), as Direktor des Residenztheaters
- I Once Had a Beautiful Homeland (1928), as Besitzer eines Hafengasthauses
- Waltz of Love (1930), as Dr. Lemke
- Fairground People (1930), as Anny's Father
- Terra Melophon Magazin Nr. 1 (short film) - Der Milliardär (1930)
- Moritz Makes His Fortune (1931), as Leo Meier
- That's All That Matters (1931)
- Express 13 (1931), as Terry
- Checkmate (1931), as Defense lawyer
