= Victims of Passion =

1922 film

- Directed by: Paul Czinner
- Produced by: Alfred Maack
- Cinematography: Adolf Schlasy
- Production company: Maak-Film
- Release date: 1922
- Country: Germany
- Languages: Silent; German intertitles

Victims of Passion (German: Opfer der Leidenschaft) is a 1922 German silent film directed by Paul Czinner.

== Cast ==
In alphabetical order

- Paul Bildt as Alberto Morand
- Jaro Fürth
- Arnold Korff as Dr. Hinx
- Maria Orska as Mia, Morand's wife
- Johannes Riemann as Raolo Benghatti

== Bibliography ==
- Bock, Hans-Michael; Bergfelder, Tim, eds. (2009). The Concise Cinegraph: Encyclopaedia of German Cinema. New York: Berghahn Books. ISBN 978-1-57181-655-9.
