= Thieves on Strike =

1921 film

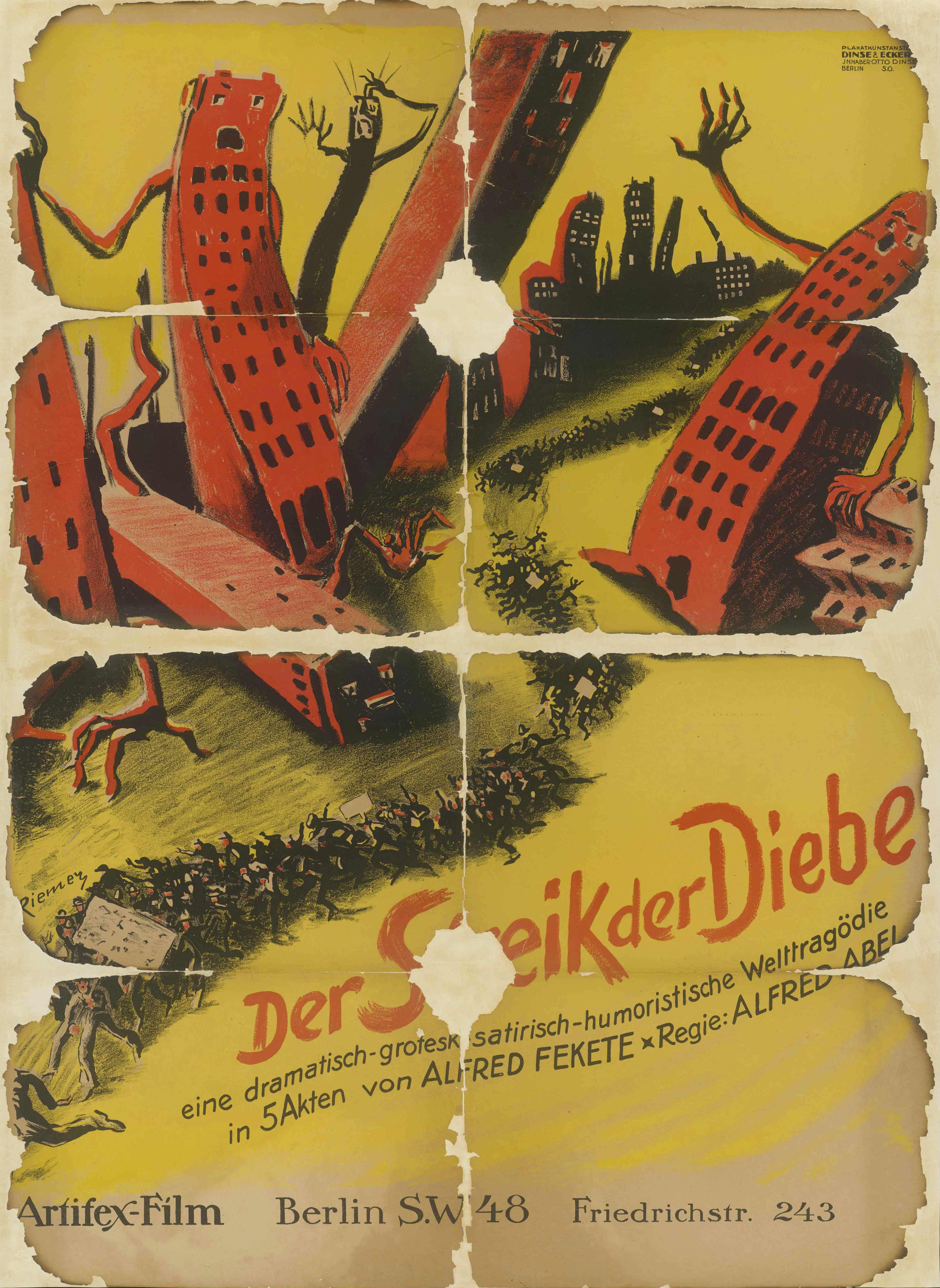
- Directed by: Alfred Abel
- Written by: Alfred Fekete
- Production company: Artifex-Film
- Release date: 25 February 1921
- Country: Germany
- Languages: Silent; German intertitles

Thieves on Strike (German:Der Streik der Diebe) is a 1921 German silent film directed by Alfred Abel.

== Cast ==
In alphabetical order

- Alfred Abel as Will Fair
- Charlotte Ander
- Victor Colani
- Hans Kuhnert
- Maria Orska
- Albert Steinrück

== Bibliography ==
- Hans-Michael Bock and Tim Bergfelder. The Concise Cinegraph: An Encyclopedia of German Cinema. Berghahn Books.
