= The New Land (1924 film) =

1924 film directed by Hans Behrendt

- Directed by: Hans Behrendt
- Written by: Hans Behrendt; Erich Pabst
- Produced by: Otto Gebühr
- Starring: Otto Gebühr; Reinhold Schünzel; Aud Egede-Nissen; Viktor Schwanneke
- Cinematography: Curt Helling; Helmar Lerski; Theodor Sparkuhl; Erich Waschneck
- Music by: Willy Schmidt-Gentner
- Production company: Otto Gebühr-Film
- Distributed by: Lloyd Film
- Release date: 12 August 1924
- Country: Germany
- Languages: Silent; German intertitles

The New Land (German: Neuland) is a 1924 German silent historical film directed by Hans Behrendt and starring Otto Gebühr, Reinhold Schünzel, and Aud Egede-Nissen. It depicts the discovery of the Americas by Christopher Columbus. The film's sets were designed by the art directors Fritz Lück and Walter Reimann. It premiered in Berlin on 12 August 1924.

== Cast ==
- Otto Gebühr
- Reinhold Schünzel
- Aud Egede-Nissen
- Viktor Schwanneke
- Josef Dischner
- Hanna Bartz
- Kaethe Richter

== Bibliography ==
- Grange, William (2008). Cultural Chronicle of the Weimar Republic. Lanham, MD: Scarecrow Press. ISBN 978-0-8108-5967-8.
