= Julian Oktawian Zachariewicz-Lwigród =

Polish architect and renovator

Julian Zachariewicz
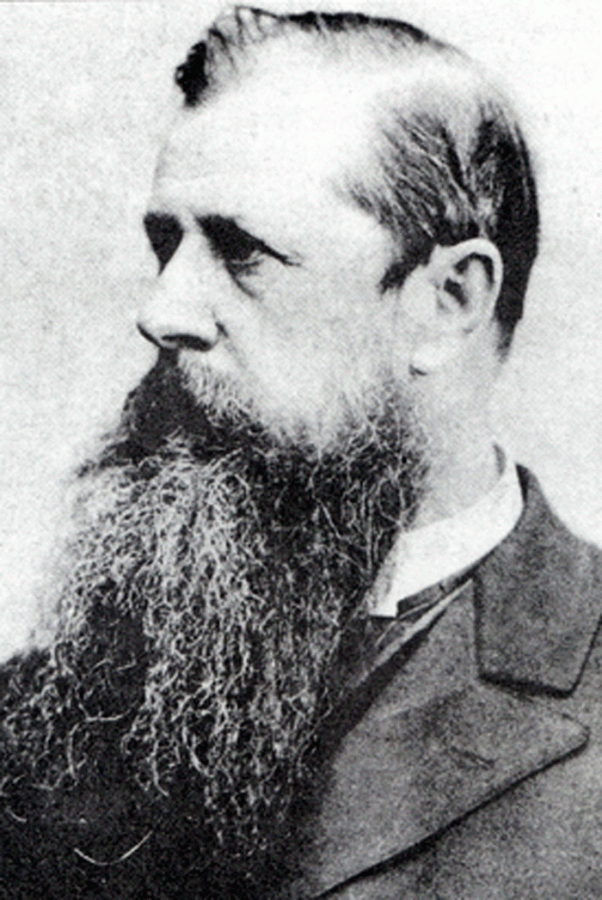
- Born: 17 July 1837; Lemberg, Kingdom of Galicia and Lodomeria, Austrian Empire
- Died: 27 December 1898 (aged 61); Lemberg, Kingdom of Galicia and Lodomeria, Austria-Hungary (now Ukraine)
- Occupation: architect
- Partner: Ludwina Zachariewicz née Sidorowicz
- Children: Alfred Zachariewicz; Julian Edwin Zachariewicz
- Practice: Lviv Polytechnic
- Buildings: Main building of the Lviv Polytechnic; Iași railway station Galician Savings Bank in Lviv

Julian Oktawian Zachariewicz-Lwigród (17 July 1837 – 27 December 1898), commonly referred to as Julian Zachariewicz, was a Polish architect and renovator of Armenian descent. Zachariewicz was a graduate of the Royal Polytechnic Institute in Vienna, and a professor and rector (1881–1882) of the Lemberg Polytechnic. Father of architect Alfred Zachariewicz and intellectual Julian Edwin Zachariewicz.

== Life ==
He was born in Lemberg, Austrian Empire (Polish: Lwów, now Lviv, Ukraine) into the family of Georgiy Zakharievich, an Armenian and Yuzepa Grosman, a German Lutheran.

In 1858, he graduated from the Vienna University of Technology. Until 1870, he held numerous positions as a qualified engineer in the Austrian State Railways.

In the 1860s, he worked for the Lviv-Chernivtsi Railway in various positions, ranging from railway engineer in Vienna, Timisoara, and Lviv to traffic manager in Chernivtsi. While working for this railway, he designed the railway station in Iasi.

In 1871, he was offered the post of director of the newly-established Faculty of Civil Engineering at the Lviv Technical Academy (now Lviv Polytechnic). As a consequence, he returned to Lviv and worked as professor at the academy and was appointed dean of the Faculty of Civil Engineering. Between 1877–1878 and 1881–1882 he served as rector of the Lviv Polytechnic.

In 1877, he received the "Ritter" title of Austrian nobility (Grade II) with the predicate "von Lwigród". He designed the main building of the Lemberg Polytechnic as well as a separate building of the Faculty of Chemistry. The main building of the polytechnic, known as the "Mother of Polish Technical Universities", was designed in the eclectic Neo-Renaissance style that was fashionable at the time.

Zachariewicz made a number of journeys across Germany and Austria before designing the polytechnic, in order to familiarise himself with the newest innovations relating to the construction of this type of building. He also designed numerous public buildings and private residences, including the Iași railway station (1869–70), the Czernowitz Synagogue, the Galician Savings Bank in Lviv, Church of Franciscan Sisters in Lviv, Jan Styka's villa, and the Tyszkiewicz Villa in Vilnius. He also carried out the renovation of the Church of the Holy Family in Tarnów as well as controversial renovations of the Church of Our Lady of the Snow in Lviv and the Church of John the Baptist in Lviv.

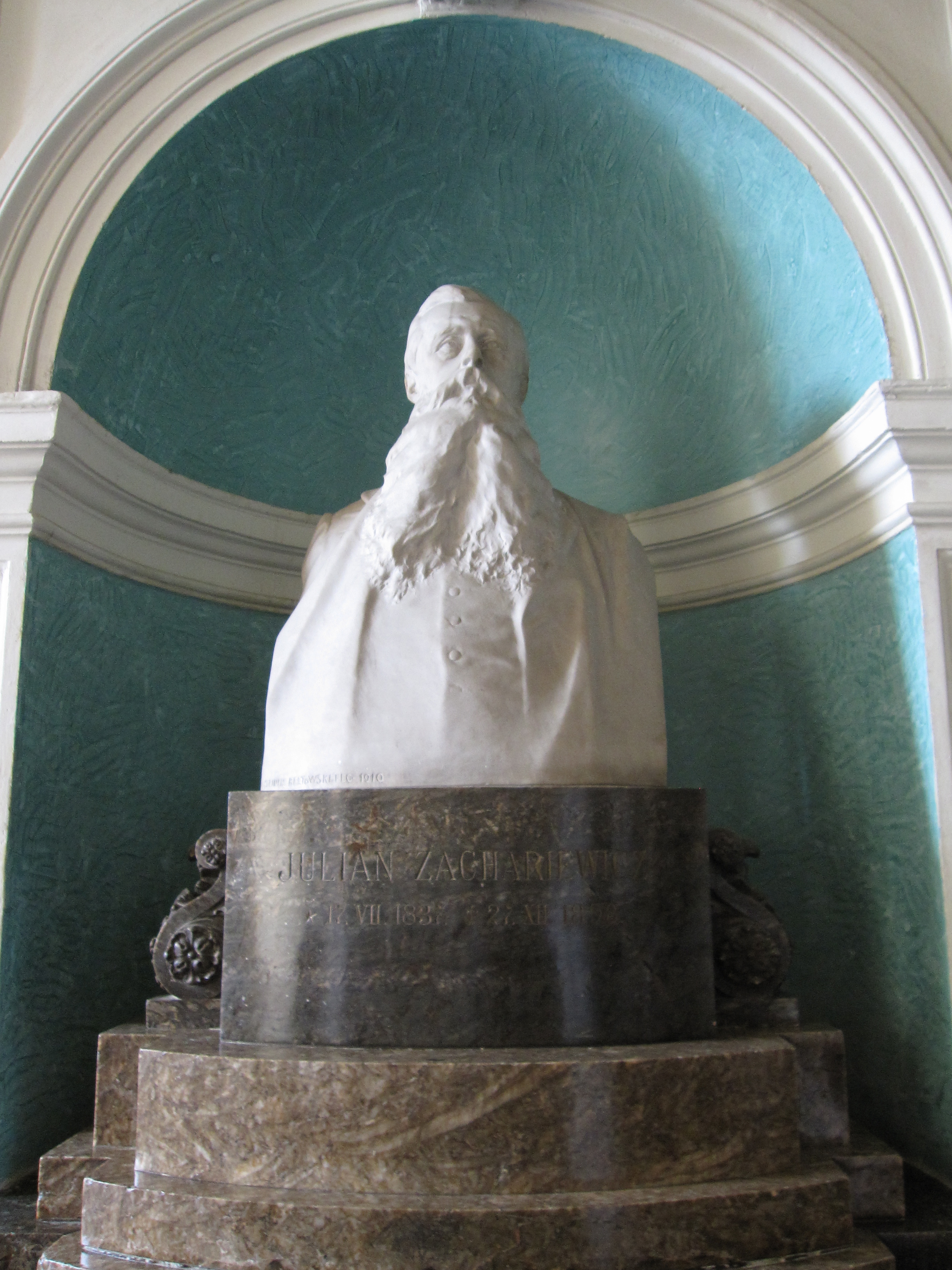
Marble bust of Prof. Julian Zachariewicz located in the foyer of Lviv Polytechnic by Juliusz Wojciech Bełtowski

In 1894, he supervised (alongside Franciszek Skowron) the construction of more than 100 pavilions for the General National Exhibition in Lviv. He was also a member of the statutory exhibition commission. He is the author of the book Zabytki sztuki w Polsce (Works of Art in Poland) published in 1895.

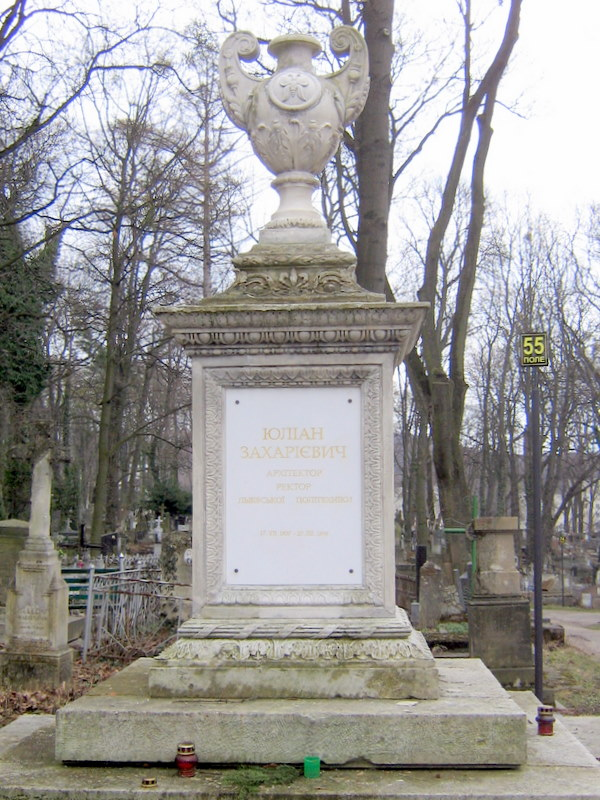
The tombstone of Julian Zachariewicz at Lychakiv Cemetery in Lviv

He died in Lemberg and was interred at the Lychakiv Cemetery.

From April 13 to May 15, 1905, drawings of wooden architecture samples made by Zachariewicz were exhibited at the Czapski Palace in Krakow. In 1910, a bust of Julian Zachariewicz by Juliusz Beltowski was installed in the lobby of the main building of the Lviv Polytechnic, which was solemnly unveiled on September 11, the final day of the Fifth Congress of Technicians in Lviv. The same year, Zachariewicz's projects were exhibited at the first architectural exhibition in Lviv. From 1901 to 1946, a street was named after Zachariewicz, which is now called Arkhitektorska Street. In 1992, another street in Lviv was named in his honor.

== Gallery ==
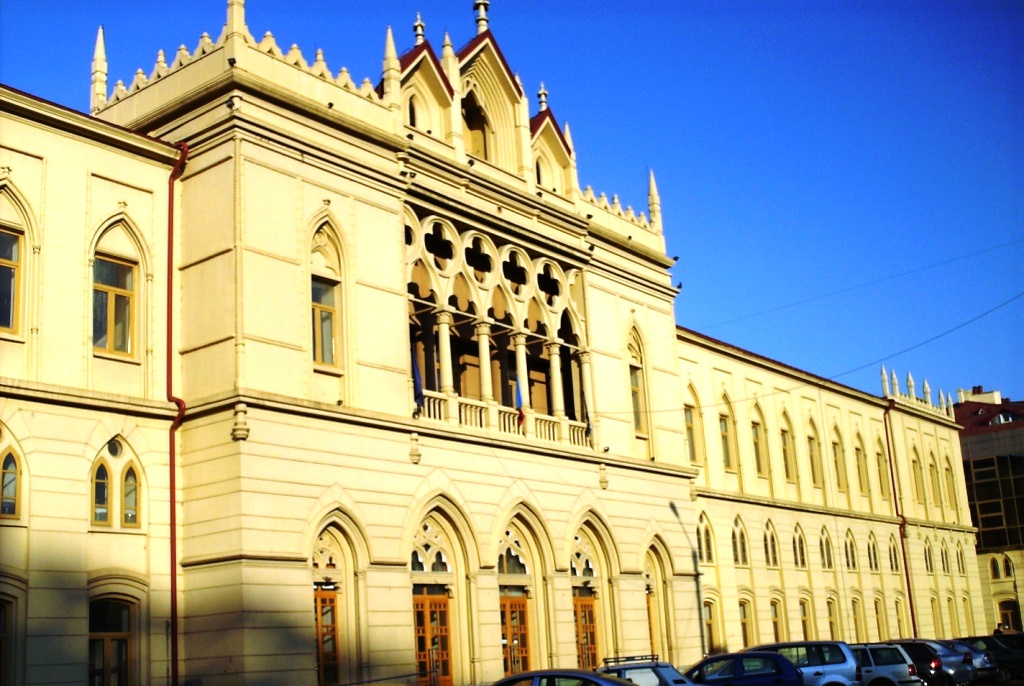
Iași railway station

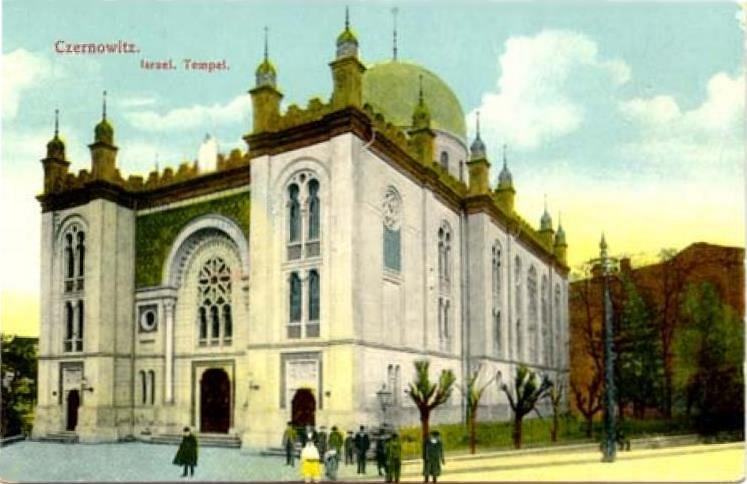
Czernowitz Synagogue

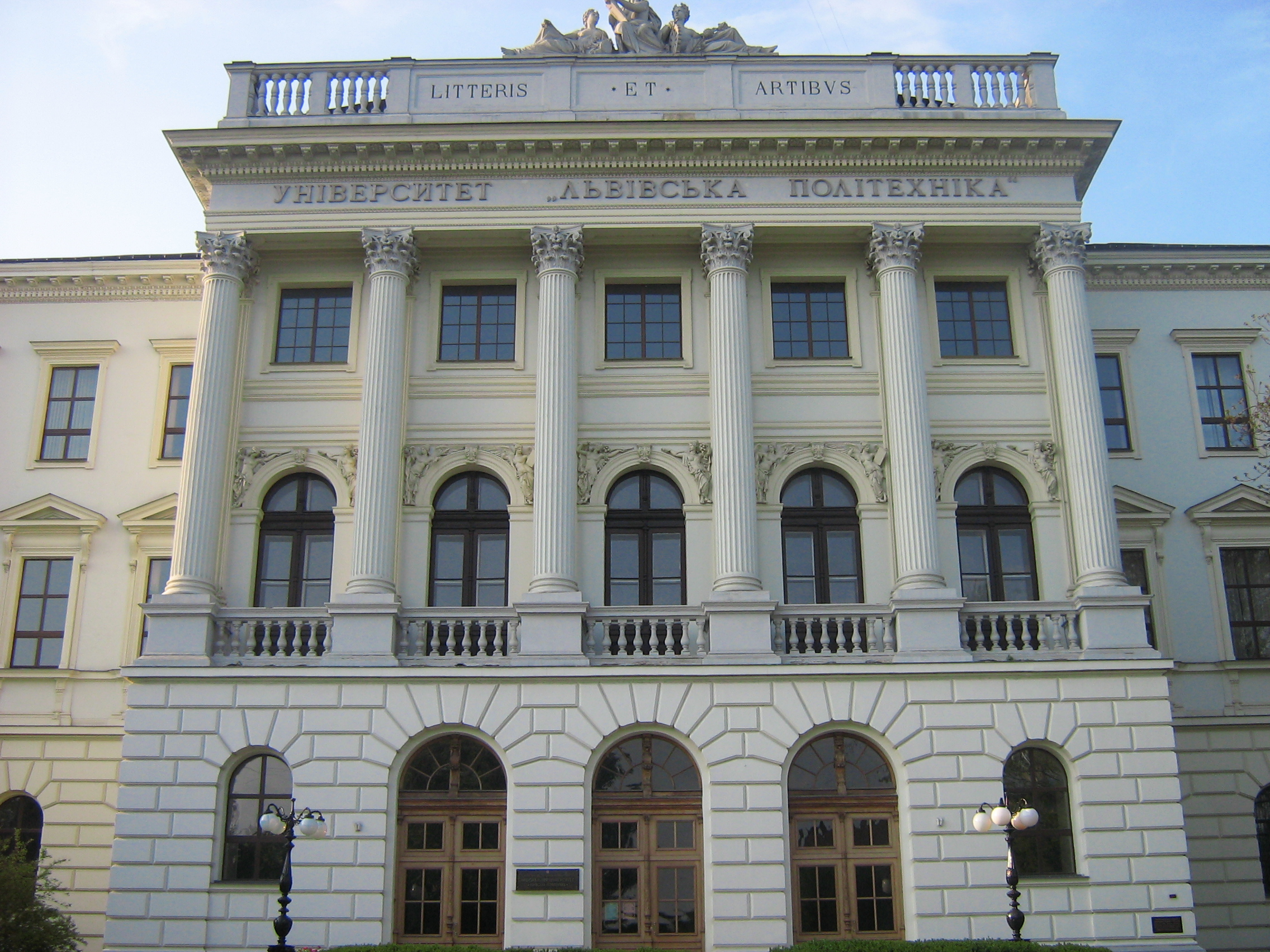
Main building of Lviv Polytechnic

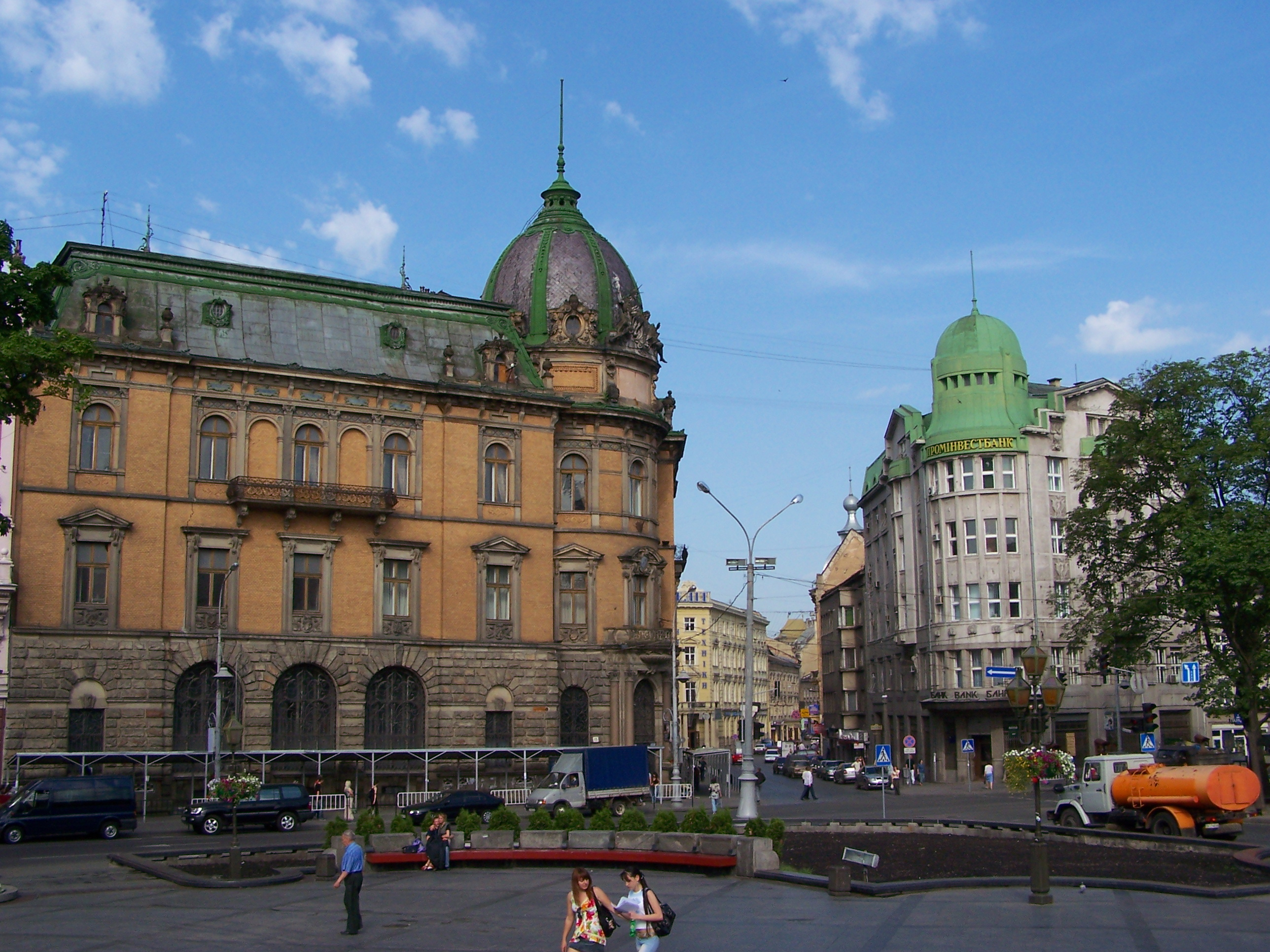
Galician Savings Bank, Lviv

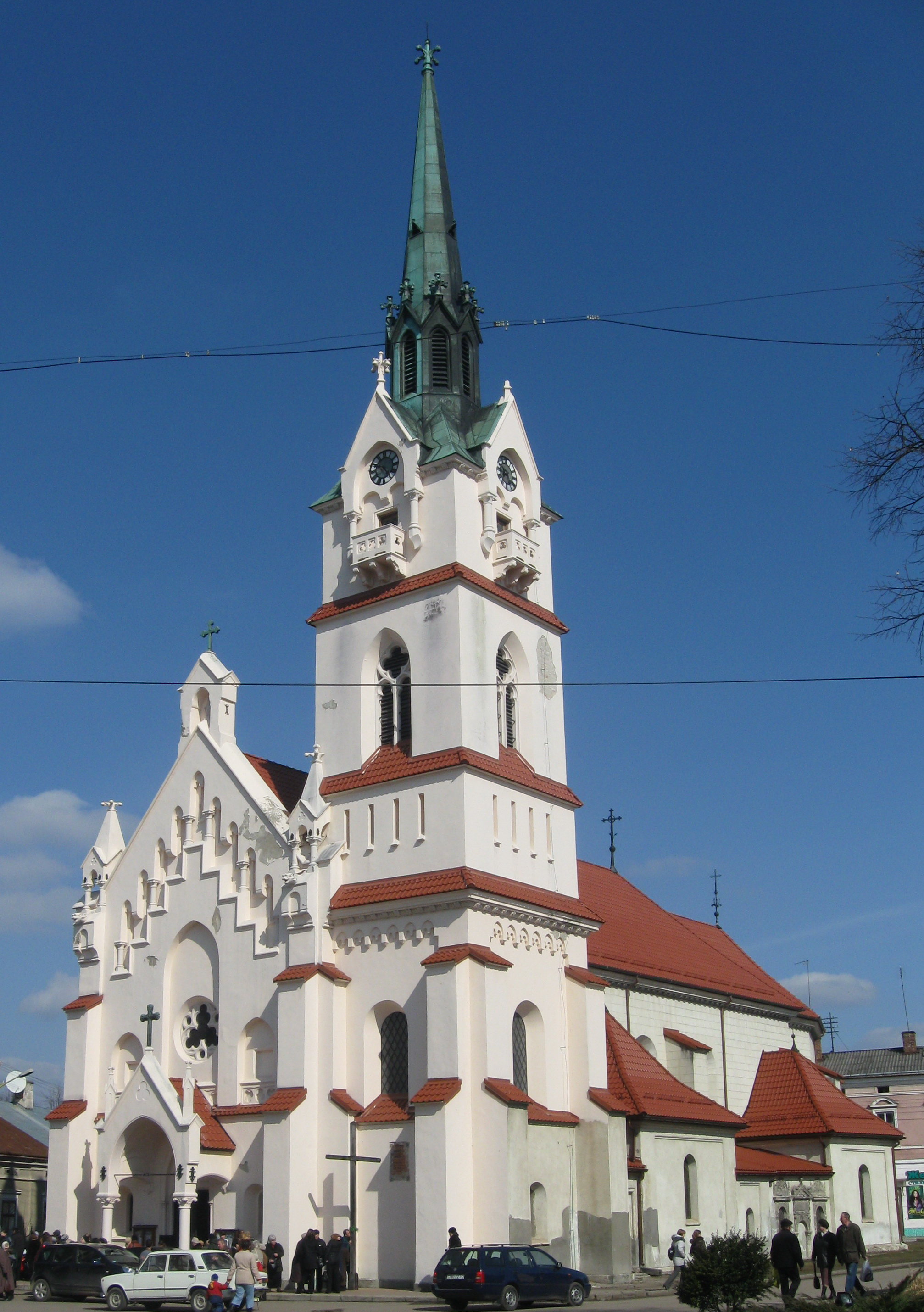
St. Mary's Church in Stryi

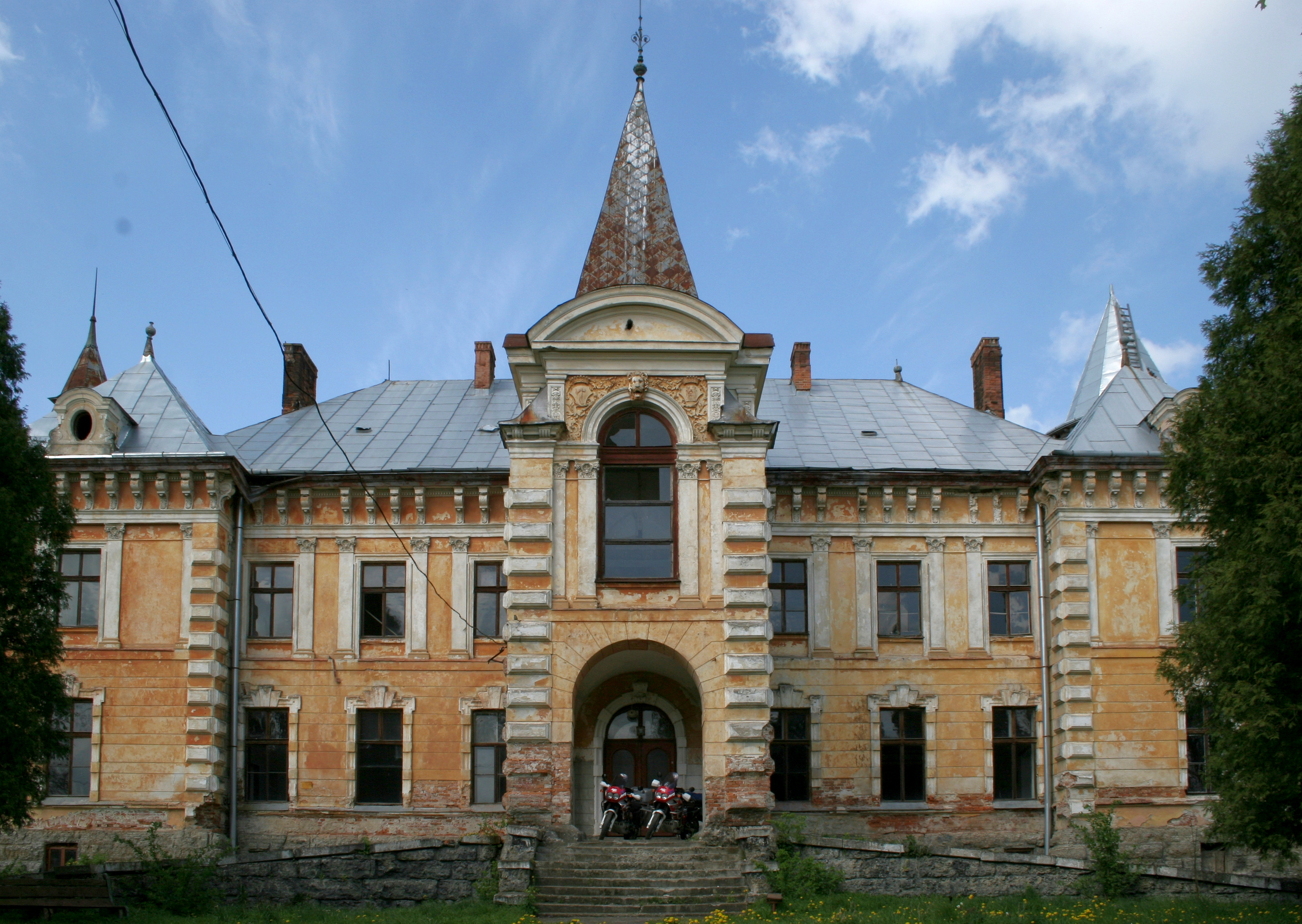
Psary Palace

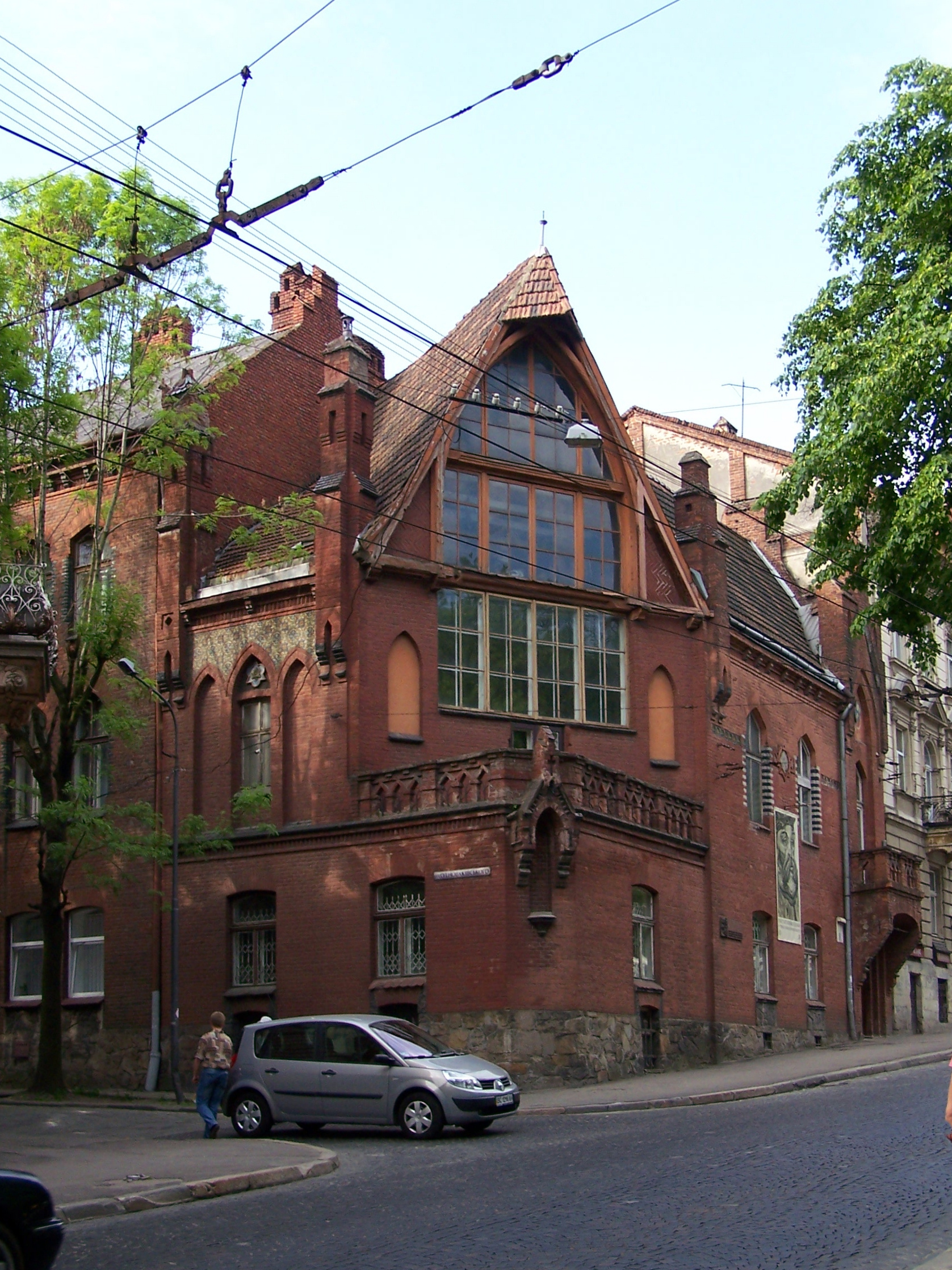
Jan Styka House, Lviv

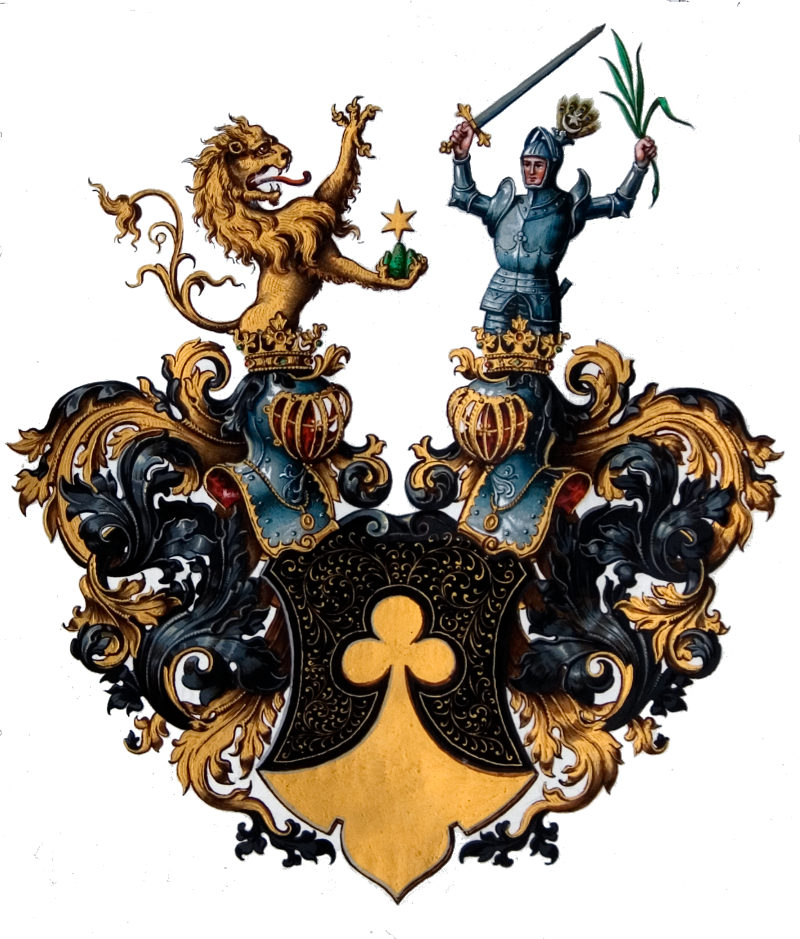
Zachariewicz coat of arms

== See also ==
- History of Lviv
- Teodor Talowski
- Zygmunt Gorgolewski

== Bibliography ==
- Polak, Paweł (2016). "Julian Edwin Zachariewicz – filozoficzne ścieżki galicyjskiego intelektualisty" (PDF). Galicja. Studia i materiały. 2.
