= Charlotte Ander =

German actress (1902–1969)

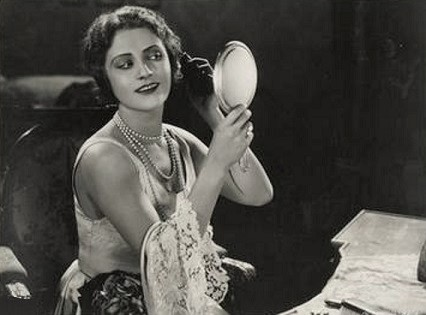
- Charlotte Ander, 1930s
- Born: Charlotte Andersch; 14 August 1902; Berlin, German Empire
- Died: 5 August 1969 (aged 66); West Berlin, West Germany
- Occupation: Actress
- Years active: 1921–1954
- Parents: Rudolf Andersch; Ida Perry

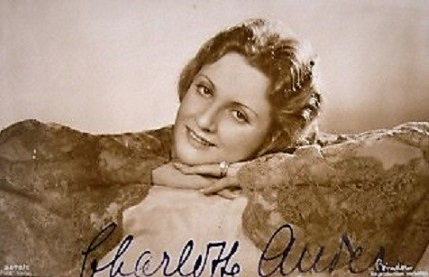
Charlotte Ander, 1920s

Charlotte Ander (born Charlotte Andersch, 14 August 1902 – 5 August 1969) was a German actress.

She was born in Berlin, the daughter of German stage/film couple Rudolf Andersch and Ida Perry. Ander was trained at the Berliner Staatstheater. Ander was a star in the silent era before making the transition to sound. Her film career started in 1920 with the film Die letzte Stunde and Danton (1921). Innumerable starring roles in silent movies and early talkies with super-stars Emil Jannings, Marlene Dietrich, and Hans Albers followed.

On 21 February 1927, she created the role of Mascha in the world premiere of Der Zarewitsch by Franz Lehar at the Deutsche Künstler Theater in Berlin, alongside Rita Georg and Richard Tauber, with the composer conducting.

She celebrated her greatest success in 1933 with the role of the record shop assistant Nina in Ein Lied geht um die Welt aka A Song Goes Around the World in which she starred with then popular singer Joseph Schmidt and her mother, Ida Perry. In 1933, after the Nazis came to power, she joined the Nazi party. She went to England and made at least two films including Maid Happy (1933), but soon found roles as hard, or harder, to find in England than they had been in Germany.

Despite the difficult conditions for her in Nazi Germany, Ander returned. She could make a living although not often in front of the cameras. Her only two Nazi era German films were Wie einst im Mai (1938) and Anton the Last (1939). Here fortunes were somewhat better on the stage where she worked until 1950 before returning to the screen in The Benthin Family. Her final film was Das tanzende Herz (1953). She died in West Berlin.

== Filmography ==
- The Last Hour (1921)
- Danton (1921)
- All for a Woman (1921)
- Trick-Track (1921)
- Sturmflut des Lebens (1921)
- Die große und die kleine Welt (1921)
- Die Abenteuer eines Ermordeten (1921)
- Thieves on Strike (1921)
- The Golden Net (1922)
- Barmaid (1922)
- The Pilgrimage of Love (1922)
- A Woman, an Animal, a Diamond (1923)
- Tragedy of Love (1923)
- The Countess of Paris (1923)
- The Enchantress (1924)
- Horrido (1924)
- The Creature (1924)
- Doctor Wislizenus (1924)
- A Waltz by Strauss (1925)
- One Minute to Twelve (1925)
- Wood Love (1925)
- Boarding House Groonen (1925)
- The Arsonist of Europe (1926)
- Der lachende Ehemann (1926)
- Vienna - Berlin (1926)
- Unmarried Daughters (1926)
- Heaven on Earth (1927)
- Circle of Lovers (1927)
- Eine kleine Freundin braucht ein jeder Mann (1927)
- The Old Fritz (1927)
- The Lady and the Chauffeur (1928)
- Gaunerliebchen (1928)
- Who Invented Divorce? (1928)
- The Night Belongs to Us (1929)
- Flachsmann the Educator (1930)
- The Tender Relatives (1930)
- Vienna, City of Song (1930)
- Nur Du (Only You) (1930)
- Poor as a Church Mouse (1931)
- The Firm Gets Married (1931)
- When the Soldiers (1931)
- Woman in the Jungle (1931)
- Inquest (1931)
- Elisabeth of Austria (1931)
- Chauffeur Antoinette (1932)
- Two Heavenly Blue Eyes (1932)
- The Magic Top Hat (1932)
- Rasputin, Demon with Women (1932)
- The Importance of Being Earnest (1932)
- Wenn dem Esel zu wohl ist (1932)
- Countess Mariza (1932)
- Goldblondes Mädchen, ich schenk' Dir mein Herz - Ich bin ja so verliebt ... (1932)
- Two in the Sunshine (1933)
- Maid Happy (1933)
- A Song Goes Round the World (1933)
- Three Bluejackets and a Blonde (1933)
- My Song Goes Round the World (1934)
- Wie einst im Mai (1938)
- Anton the Last (1939)
- The Reluctant Maharaja (1950)
- The Benthin Family (1950)
- The Dancing Heart (1953)
- The Mosquito (1954)

== Sources ==
- Habel, Frank-Burkhard; Wachter, Volker (2002). Das große Lexikon der DDR-Stars (in German). Berlin: Schwarzkopf & Schwarzkopf. ISBN 978-3-89602-391-9.
