= Moritz Makes His Fortune =

1931 film

Moritz Makes his Fortune
- Directed by: Jaap Speyer
- Written by: Bobby E. Lüthge; Willy Prager; Jean Toulout; Dr. Gourevitch
- Produced by: André Hugon
- Starring: Sig Arno; Viktor Schwanneke; Willy Prager; Irene Ambrus
- Cinematography: Theodor Sparkuhl
- Music by: Heinz Letton; Willy Rosen
- Production company: Films André Hugon
- Distributed by: Süd-Film
- Release date: 2 March 1931
- Running time: 85 minutes
- Country: Germany
- Language: German

Moritz Makes his Fortune (German: Moritz macht sein Glück) is a 1931 German comedy film directed by Jaap Speyer and starring Sig Arno, Viktor Schwanneke, and Willy Prager.

== Cast ==
- Sig Arno as Moritz Meier
- Viktor Schwanneke as Leo Meier
- Willy Prager as Max Meier
- Irene Ambrus as Ruth Meier
- Annie Ann as Lisa Langer
- Philipp Manning as Mr. Brown
- Igo Sym as Freddy Donndorf
- Ernst Pröckl as James Baron
- Leo Peukert as Fotograf
- Johannes Roth as Kunde

== See also ==
- The Levy Department Stores (French version, 1932)

== Bibliography ==
- Prawer, Siegbert Salomon (2005). Between Two Worlds: The Jewish Presence in German and Austrian Film, 1910–1933. New York: Berghahn Books. ISBN 978-1-84545-074-8.
