= Julius Koritschoner =

Austrian businessman and industrialist (1891–1928)

Julius Heinrich Koritschoner (1891–1928) was an Austrian businessman and industrialist.

== Early life ==
Koritschoner was born in Vienna on 26 February 1891, to Samuel Robert Koritschoner and Rebekka Amalia Koritschoner. His siblings were Robert Koritschoner, Hans Cory, Margarete Gretl Bienenfeld and Arnold Paul Koritschoner.

== Career ==
In 1916, he was a reserve lieutenant in the infantry regiment. His position in the war, as well as some decisions made following, helped him become wealthy. During the war, he advised the War Ministry regarding "ores and metals and thus came into close contact with the Austrian mining industry". Following the war, "he founded Montana-A.G., which helped him to become very rich". He also possessed a "large package" of shares for the Depositenbank and sat on the organization's board of directors. During this time, Koritschoner "was one of the richest men in Vienna, owned a large estate near St. Pölten and a villa in St. Wolfgang". According to Die Juedische Wieden, "While other rich people tried to hide their wealth from the public eye, Koritschoner demonstratively displayed it. In the summer, the parties on his estate on Lake Wolfgang were a regular source of gossip." He spent the winters in Johann-Strauß-Gasse. His apartment there was designed by prominent architects Friedl Dicker-Brandeis and Franz Singer, who was his cousin.

In 1924, Koritschoner was general director of the Steierische Kohlenbergwerks AG in Vienna II, Lothringerstrasse 14. By the stock market crisis of 1924, Koritschoner had "sold all his holdings and shares and invested in high-interest English railway securities". However, he later made several miscalculations in lost a tremendous amount of money. By the time of his death in 1928, Koritschoner had immense debts.

Near the end of his life, Koritschoner had begun abusing morphine and is said to have organized the trade of morphine and other drugs between Austria and Hungary, though he was still considered part of Vienna's upper echelon. However, while making a large deal one day, a morphine syringe fell from his pocket, which lost him the trust of his colleagues and those with whom he was trying to negotiate. The deal fell through, losing Koritschoner a lot of money. In November 1928, Vienna police identified him in relation to drug smuggling.

His Montana-A.G. fell into the hands of Emil Kahane (1886–1949) (alongside Friedric Weill and Rudolf Steiner), whose grandson is now, after Aryanization - as "the eleventh richest Austrian" applies.

== Personal life ==
Koritschoner was married multiple times:

- 1907: Elsa Hochmut
- Frida Koritschoner (1881 –; daughter of Josef Kindsbrunner; married to Paul Frank)
- 1915: Riccarda Helen Catharina Koritschoner, née Ciccimarra
  - Riccarda Julerl Koritschoner
- 1919: Maria Hasterlik (1900 – 1973; daughter of Dr. Paul Hasterlik; divorced Weiss, married Koritschoner, married Heller)
  - Suzanne Weiss (daughter of Ernst Weiss; fled to Kenya)
  - Giulia Koritschoner (1925–2015; married 1947; died 2015)

In 1919, Koritschoner married Mia Hasterlik-Koritschoner, daughter of senior medical officer Dr. Paul Hasterlik. Mia had previously been married to Ernst Weiss and had a daughter, Susanne, who was a toddler when the couple married. Mia and Koritschoner's daughter, Giulia Maria Koritschoner, was born in Vienna on 30 September 1925.

Toward the end of his life, Koritschoner struggled with a costly morphine addiction, as did his wife Mia, which "may have inspired him to try his hand at drug smuggling". After losing credibility at work, Koritschoner and his wife temporarily separated, and Koritschoner had additional lovers, including actresses Mimi Kött and Maria Orska. Susanne and Giulia were placed in a children's home. After being identified in connection with drug smuggling in November 1928, Koritschoner committed suicide in Istanbul on 17 December 1928. He addressed his farewell letters to his brother-in-law Dr. Rudolf Bienenfeld, wife Mia Hasterlik-Koritschoner, and lover Maria Orska. Although Koritschoner's family had been considered upper-middle-class, he died with significant debt.

According to the Nuremberg Laws, Susanne and Giulia were considered to be of Jewish descent. Mia's father was sent to Theresienstadt, where he eventually died. In December 1938, Giulia moved to Switzerland; her mother fled to England the following year. Susanne fled to Kenya. While in Switzerland, Giulia lived with various families while she completed school then worked as a maid. In 1946, both Mia and Giulia moved to New York, after which Giulia began working as a lab assistant in the Rockefeller Center for Medical Research. In 1947, she married nuclear physicist Gerald J. Hine. Her daughter Madeline was born the following year, after which she discontinued work. The couple moved to Boston in 1949, then to Vienna in 1964, due to Hines' employment with the International Atomic Energy Agency. A decade later, they returned to the United States, settling first in Washington, then in Boulder, Colorado. Mia died in 1973. In 1979, Giulia founded a company manufacturing duvets, which she sold in 1997. She later began work on the Hine Collection, which traces her family's history back to the 18th century. Giulia died in 2015.

== Legacy ==
Heimito von Doderer is said to have faithfully traced Julius Koritschoner's biography with his novel character Cornel Lasch in his 1956 novel The Demons.
