= A Woman, an Animal, a Diamond =

1923 film

- Directed by: Hanns Kobe
- Written by: Paul Beyer; Hanns Kobe
- Starring: Charlotte Ander; Fritz Kortner; Paul Bildt
- Cinematography: Werner Brandes
- Music by: Willy Kappelt
- Production company: Ungo-Film
- Release date: 3 November 1923
- Country: Germany
- Languages: Silent; German intertitles

A Woman, an Animal, a Diamond (German: Ein Weib, ein Tier, ein Diamant) is a 1923 German silent film directed by Hanns Kobe and starring Charlotte Ander, Fritz Kortner and Paul Bildt.

The film's sets were designed by the art director Fritz Lück and Walter Reimann.

== Cast ==
- Charlotte Ander as Camilla
- Fritz Kortner as Urmensch
- Paul Bildt as Stadtschreiber Iwan
- Georg John as Zirkusdirektor
- Ernst Rotmund as Bändiger
- Alexander Granach as Archivar Lindhorst
- Viktor Schwannecke as Bürgermeister
- Ernst Behmer
- Hugo Döblin
- Paul Graetz
- Leon Richter
- Wilhelm Völcker
- Yuri Yurovsky

== Bibliography ==
- Bock, Hans-Michael & Bergfelder, Tim. The Concise CineGraph. Encyclopedia of German Cinema. Berghahn Books, 2009.
