= The Last Hour (1921 film) =

1921 film

- Directed by: Dimitri Buchowetzki
- Written by: Robert Liebmann
- Starring: Reinhold Schünzel; Charlotte Ander; Maria Orska
- Cinematography: Arpad Viragh
- Production company: Reinhold Schünzel Film
- Release date: 14 February 1921
- Country: Germany
- Languages: Silent; German intertitles

The Last Hour (German: Die letzte Stunde) is a 1921 German silent film directed by Dimitri Buchowetzki and starring Reinhold Schünzel, Charlotte Ander and Maria Orska.

The film's sets were designed by the art director Hanns Otto.

== Cast ==
- Reinhold Schünzel
- Charlotte Ander
- Emil Biron
- Hanne Brinkmann
- Sadjah Gezza
- Maria Orska
- Ernst Pröckl

== Bibliography ==
- Bock, Hans-Michael & Bergfelder, Tim. The Concise CineGraph. Encyclopedia of German Cinema. Berghahn Books, 2009.
