= Czernowitz Synagogue =

Former synagogue in Chernivtsi, Ukraine

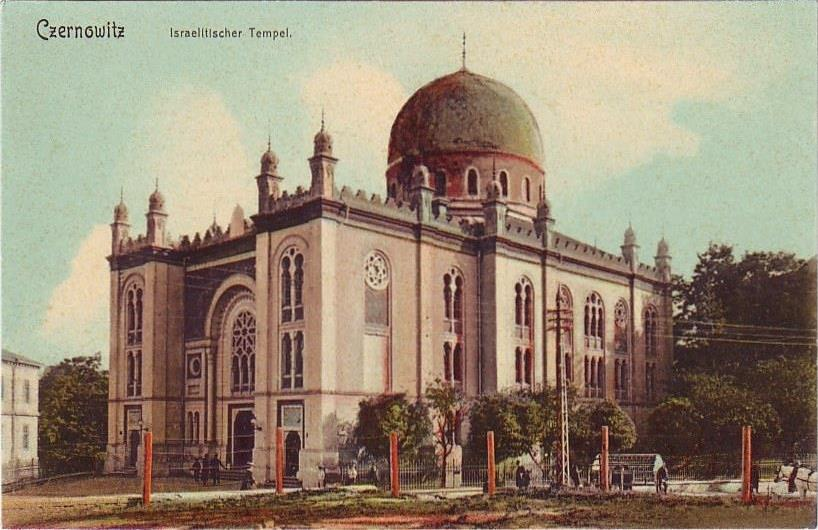
- A postcard of the former synagogue in early 1900s

- Location of the former synagogue in Ukraine

Religion
- Affiliation: Reform Judaism (former)
- Ecclesiastical or organisational status: Synagogue (1873–1941); Movie theater (since 1959)
- Status: Abandoned (as a synagogue); Repurposed (as a theater)

Location
- Location: Chernivtsi, Chernivtsi Oblast
- Country: Ukraine
- Coordinates: 48°17′35″N 25°55′59″E

Architecture
- Architect: Julian Zachariewicz
- Type: Synagogue architecture
- Style: Moorish Revival
- Established: 1872 (as a congregation)
- Completed: 1879
- Dome: One

The Czernowitz Synagogue, also called The Temple of Czernowitz (Ukrainian: Темпль, lit. 'Temple') was a former Reform Jewish synagogue located in Chernivtsi, in the Chernivtsi Oblast of Ukraine. The synagogue was built in 1873 in what was then called Czernowitz, in the Austrian Hungary Empire. Closed in 1940, the building was repurposed and used as a movie theater since 1959.

== History ==
The first known presence of Jews in Czernowitz was in 1408. In the sixteenth and seventeenth centuries, the number of Jewish inhabitants increased significantly. The Great Synagogue in Chernivtsi, an Ashkenazi congregation, was completed in 1853. In 1872 a split occurred between the Reform and Orthodox communities living in Czernowitz; and the following year the Reform congregation began construction of The Temple of Czernowitz, designed by Julian Zachariewicz in the Moorish Revival style. By 1878 the congregation had reunited and the new synagogue, the most prominent at the time, was used for worshipping.

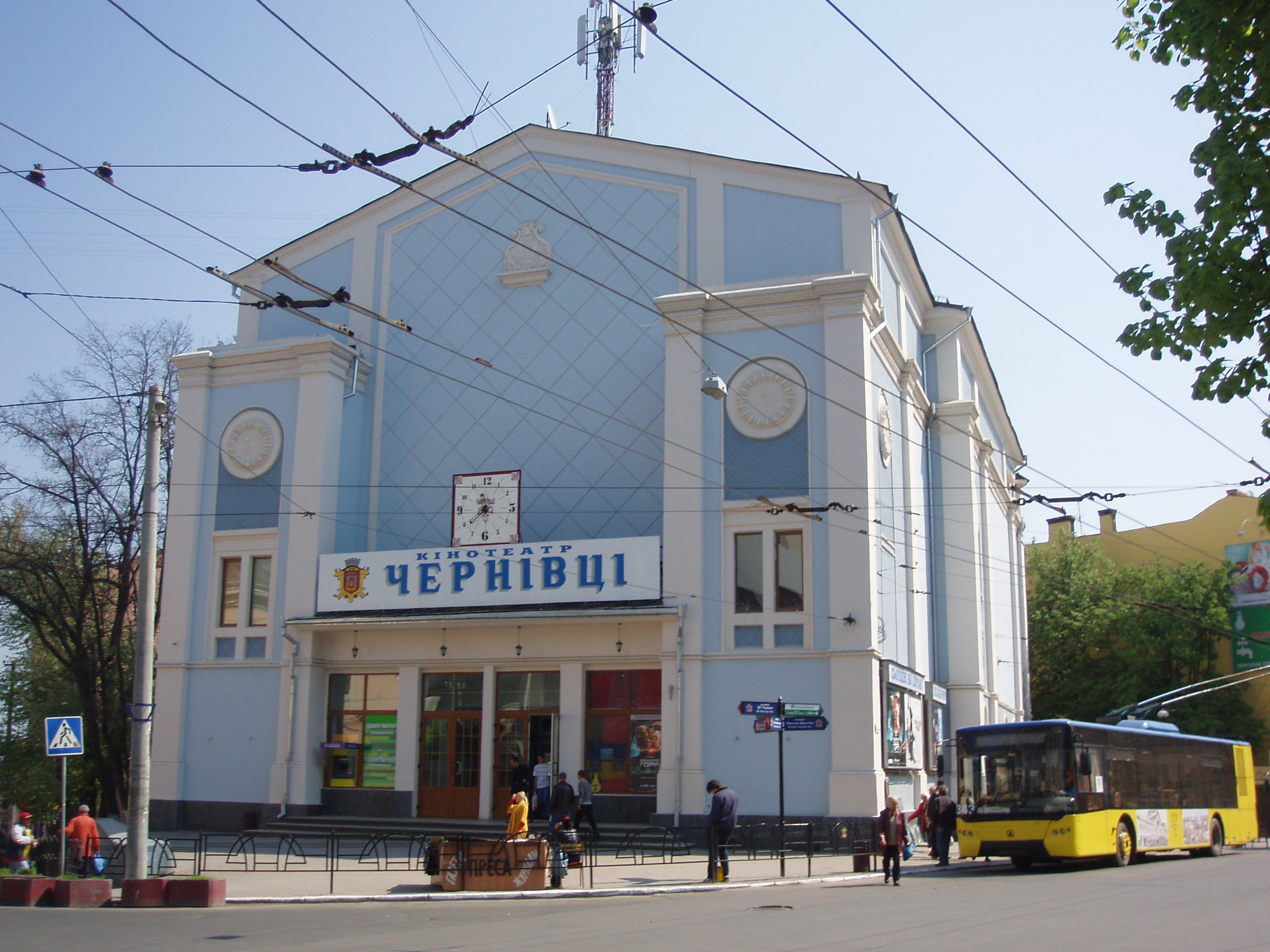
Movie theater "Chernivtsi"

The synagogue was visited on 16 September 1880 by Emperor Francis Joseph of Austria, and, on 16 May 1920, by king Ferdinand I of Romania.

The synagogue was confiscated and closed by the Soviet government after annexing Northern Bukovina and its largest city, Czernowitz, from Romania in 1940.

The building was burned by German and Romanian soldiers on 5 July 1941, after Nazi-allied Romania retook the city. After World War II the Soviet authorities tried to blow up the destroyed temple, but the building survived. In 1959, the outer walls were used to partially reconstruct the building for use as a movie theater that was named Zhovten ('October', in honor of the October Revolution). The building lost its dome and retains very little of its former appearance. After the fall of the Soviet Union the theater lost its Soviet name and was renamed "Chernivtsi".

Joseph Schmidt sang in the choir as a boy and served as cantor as an adult.

== Other synagogues in Chernivtsi ==
On 25 September 2001, a synagogue was opened in Chernivtsi. The Sadovsky Street Synagogue, closed by the Soviet Regime, was renovated, reopened, and also serves the Jewish Community Center.

== See also ==
- History of the Jews in Chernivtsi
- History of the Jews in Ukraine
- List of synagogues in Ukraine
