= Maid Happy =

- Directed by: Mansfield Markham
- Written by: Garrett Graham; Jack King
- Produced by: Mansfield Markham
- Starring: Charlotte Ander; Johannes Riemann; Dennis Hoey
- Cinematography: Emil Schünemann; James Wilson
- Music by: Jack King
- Production companies: British International Pictures; Bendar Productions
- Distributed by: Williams and Pritchard Films
- Release date: 1933
- Running time: 75 minutes
- Country: United Kingdom
- Language: English

Maid Happy is a 1933 British musical film directed by Mansfield Markham and starring Charlotte Ander, Johannes Riemann and Dennis Hoey.

It was made at Elstree Studios by British International Pictures but distributed independently. The German art director Walter Reimann designed the film's sets.

== Cast ==
- Charlotte Ander as Lena
- Johannes Riemann as Fritz
- Dennis Hoey as Sir Rudolph Bartlett
- Marjorie Mars as Mary Loo
- Sybil Grove as Miss Warburton
- Gerhard Dammann as Schmidt
- Polly Luce as Madge
- Harold Saxon-Snell as Bruckmann
- Marie Ault as Miss Woods

== Bibliography ==
- Low, Rachael. Filmmaking in 1930s Britain. George Allen & Unwin, 1985.
- Wood, Linda. British Films, 1927-1939. British Film Institute, 1986.
