= Our Heavenly Bodies =

1925 film

- Directed by: Hanns Walter Kornblum (animated scenes); Johannes Meyer; Rudolf Biebrach
- Written by: Hanns Walter Kornblum; Ernst Krieger
- Starring: Paul Bildt, Willy Kaiser-Heyl, Theodor Loos, Oscar Marion
- Cinematography: (animated scenes) Hermann Boeheln, Otto von Bothmer, Wera Cleve, Bodo Kuntze, Eowald Matthias Schumacher, (nature and studio scenes) Max Brinck, Friedrich Paulmann, Hans Scholz, Friedrich Weinmann
- Music by: Ignatz Waghalter (composer of score)
- Production companies: Kultur department of the Universum-Film AG (Ufa) and Colonna-film G.m.b.H.
- Release date: 1925
- Running time: 92 min
- Country: Germany
- Language: German silent

Our Heavenly Bodies (German: Wunder der Schöpfung, literally: Wonder of the Creation) is a 1925 German educational film written by Hanns Walter Kornblum and Ernst Krieger which attempts to represent everything known about the cosmos at the time. It covers the origin and mechanics of the Solar System, gravitation, the stars, and the nature of galaxies.

The film is a prime example of the early German "Kulturfilm", which are regarded as predecessors of the modern film documentary. It features a large variety of special effects and animations, as well as fantastical depictions of travel around the Solar System and to the stars. Prints were color-tinted and color-toned for effect.

The film has been reconstructed in 2008 by Munich Film Archive using material from the National Audiovisual Institute (Finland) in Helsinki and the Deutsche Kinemathek in Berlin. The current rights holder is the Friedrich-Wilhelm-Murnau Foundation.

== Acts ==
1) On the Road to Truth (German: Auf dem Weg zur Wahrheit)
A history of cosmology.

2) The Night Sky (German: Der nächtliche Himmel)
The Moon: its motion and faces, its tides, lunar eclipses; the fixed stars, Berlin-Babelsberg Observatory, constellations, the North Star, comets, meteors and falling stars.

3) The Star of Day (German: Das Gestirn des Tages)
Sunspots, auroras, solar eclipse, solar prominences, night, day and meridians, heating of the equator vs. poles, earthly seasons.

4) A Flight to the Moon (German: Ein Flug zum Mond)
Introduces a "fantasty ship" pulled by "huge electrical energies", calls it a "space ship". Depicts its launch, discusses the nature of the vacuum of space, the idea of a Moon-day, the Earth as seen from the Moon.

5) The Sun's Children (German: Der Sonne Kinder)
Continues the imaginary journey to Mercury (mentions that it's thought that Mercury always presents the same face to the Sun), Venus, Mars, its seasons and polar caps, the observed canals. Depicts an imaginary landing, and people bouncing around in reduced gravity. Asteroids. A depiction of Gulliver's Travels in Lilliput illustrates Jupiter's size. The moons of Jupiter. Depicts a person labouring to crawl on the surface of Jupiter, and giants residing on Jupiter. Saturn's rings as "numberless small bodies", depicts the rings as seen from Saturn, and Saturn's moons; Uranus; Neptune, its discovery, and its one big moon.

6) At the Gates of Infinity (German: An den Toren der Unendlichkeit)
Explains that there is no up or down in space, and attempts to show people in zero gravity; discusses nebulas. The travellers use a flat view screen to look back on Earth, where they witness historical events. As the ship proceeds to travel faster than light, the travellers view the same historical events in reverse. The ship then proceeds much faster than light to visit binary stars — Algol, globular cluster. The fantasy comes to an end as they leave the last star of the Milky Way. (In 1924 it was controversial whether the Milky Way comprised the universe or not.)

7) Becoming and Waning in Outer Space (German: Werden und Vergehen im Weltenraum)
Discusses the relative movements of stars; that the shape of constellations is a matter of perspective; a mass of gas taking a spiral disk shape, wherein knots form to become planets — in their youth as gas, forming a solid kernel — formation of (terrestrial) planets; erosion of surface of Earth, prehistoric creatures. Speculates on the future of the Earth — shows people freezing, then a very extended depiction of the world burning up upon being hit by another heavenly body.

== Further Credits ==
Scientific review:

- Professor Dr. Guthnick
- Professor Dr. Kopff
- Professor Dr. Ludendorff
- Professor Dr. Solger

Constructions:

- Gustav Hennig
- Hans Minzloff
- Walter Reimann
- Karl Stahl-Urach

== Film Reconstruction ==
- Stefan Drössler
- Christian Ketels
- Gerhard Ullmann

"Thanks to"

- Antti Alanen
- Annette Groschke
- Juha Kindberg
- Konrad und Wolfgang Kornblum
- Eva Orbanz
- Jon Wengström

== Reception and legacy ==
The film is described as being "overwhelming", a "wild success" at the time, in contrast with the Ufa's later, better known production Metropolis.

Scenes of the film are often described as forerunners of space science-fiction films, especially Stanley Kubrick's 2001: A Space Odyssey. The spirit and content of the film more closely parallels that of Carl Sagan's TV series Cosmos: A Personal Voyage.
