= Thank You, Mr. Pepys! =

1937 play

- Original language: English
- Written by: W.P. Lipscomb
- Genre: Historical
- Setting: England, Seventeenth century

Premiere
- Date: 18 October 1937
- Place: Hippodrome, Golders Green

Thank You, Mr. Pepys! is a historical play by the British writer W.P. Lipscomb. It was inspired by the three-volume biography of Samuel Pepys by historian Arthur Bryant, focusing in particular on his administration of the Royal Navy, and takes place in London and Oxford during the seventeenth century. It premiered at the Hippodrome, Golders Green on 18 October 1937, under the title Ninety Sail. After altering its title it ran for 126 performances in London's West End between and 30 November 1937 and 26 March 1938, initially at the Shaftesbury Theatre before transferring to the Savoy. The West End cast included Edmund Gwenn as Pepys, Barry K. Barnes as Charles II, Henry Oscar as Lord Shaftesbury, Hugh Latimer as Sir Edmund Godfrey, Stella Bonheur as Marry Skinner and Marjorie Mars as Nell Gwynn. It was produced by Miles Malleson while the costumes were designed by Elizabeth Haffenden.

== TV Adaptation ==
It was broadcast on the BBC in 1938, one of the pioneering early pre-war productions that simply shot a stage play un-dynamically.

The first act was televised on 6 January 1938. Barry Barnes was meant to play Charles II but he was unable to appear in the production due to a film contract and author WP Lipscomb played the role instead. Evening Standard wrote "there was nothing of the understudy about Mr Lipscomb's performance."

The TV version reduced the running time to forty minutes and was directed by George More O'Ferrall.

=== Cast ===
- Edmund Gwenn as Mr. Samuel Pepys
- WP Lipscomb as King Charles II
- Marjorie Mars as Nell Gwynn
- Henry Oscar as Earl of Shaftesbury

== Bibliography ==
- Vahimagi, Tise. British Television: An Illustrated Guide. Oxford University Press, 1996.
- Wearing, J. P. The London Stage 1930–1939: A Calendar of Productions, Performers, and Personnel. Rowman & Littlefield, 2014.
