= Doctor Wislizenus =

1924 film

- Directed by: Hanns Kobe
- Written by: Paul Beyer; Willy Haas
- Starring: Charlotte Ander; Fritz Kortner; Jakob Tiedtke
- Cinematography: A.O. Weitzenberg
- Production company: Berliner Film
- Release date: 1924
- Country: Germany
- Languages: Silent; German intertitles

Doctor Wislizenus is a 1924 German silent film directed by Hanns Kobe and starring Charlotte Ander, Fritz Kortner and Jakob Tiedtke.

The film's sets were designed by the art director Robert A. Dietrich.

== Cast ==
In alphabetical order

- Charlotte Ander as Lena
- Siegfried Berisch as Milbe
- Paul Bildt as Dichter Wohlgetan
- Paul Graetz as Iltis
- Fritz Kortner as Dr. Wislizenus
- Marija Leiko
- Leon Richter as Engerling
- Joachim Ringelnatz as Alte Frau
- Jakob Tiedtke as Wirt

== Bibliography ==
- Hans-Michael Bock and Tim Bergfelder. The Concise Cinegraph: An Encyclopedia of German Cinema. Berghahn Books, 2009.
