= Marjorie Mars =

British actress (1903–1991)

- Born: 31 January 1903; Hampstead, London, United Kingdom
- Died: 22 December 1991 (aged 88); Kingston, London, United Kingdom
- Occupation: Actress
- Years active: 1928–1966 (film & TV)

Marjorie Mars (31 January 1903 – 22 December 1991) was a British stage actress who also appeared in film and television. She appeared frequently in the West End. She made her West End debut in the musical A Night Out at the Winter Garden Theatre in 1920. In 1937 she appeared as Nell Gwynn in the historical play Thank You, Mr. Pepys!. In 1950 she was in the cast of the first West End version of the musical Carousel.

On screen she made her debut in the 1928 silent film Yellow Stockings and appeared in a supporting role in the 1945 film Brief Encounter. She featured many early BBC television films, often adapted directly from plays.

She was married to the television producer and director Graeme Muir from 1941 to his death in 1987.

== Selected filmography ==
- Yellow Stockings (1928)
- Maid Happy (1933)
- The Crouching Beast (1935)
- The Shadow of Mike Emerald (1936)
- Spy of Napoleon (1936)
- Brief Encounter (1945)
- Take My Life (1947)

== Bibliography ==
- Phillips, Gene. Beyond the Epic: The Life and Films of David Lean. University Press of Kentucky, 2006.
- Wearing, J. P. The London Stage 1920–1929: A Calendar of Productions, Performers, and Personnel. Rowman & Littlefield, 2014.
- Wearing, J. P. The London Stage 1930–1939: A Calendar of Productions, Performers, and Personnel. Rowman & Littlefield, 2014.
- Wright, Adrian. West End Broadway: The Golden Age of the American Musical in London. Boydell Press, 2012.
