= Two Heavenly Blue Eyes =

1932 film

- Directed by: Johannes Meyer
- Written by: Ernst Neubach
- Produced by: Ulrich K.T. Schultz; Robert Wüllner
- Starring: Charlotte Ander; Hermann Thimig; Theo Lingen
- Cinematography: Willy Hameister
- Edited by: Hilde Grebner
- Music by: Fred Raymond
- Production companies: Schulz & Wuellner Produktion
- Distributed by: Werner Film
- Release date: 21 January 1932
- Running time: 89 minutes
- Country: Germany
- Language: German

Two Heavenly Blue Eyes or Two Sky Blue Eyes (German: Zwei himmelblaue Augen) is a 1932 German musical comedy film directed by Johannes Meyer and starring Charlotte Ander, Hermann Thimig and Theo Lingen. It was shot at the Babelsberg Studios in Berlin. The film's sets were designed by the art directors Willi Herrmann and Herbert O. Phillips.

== Cast ==
- Charlotte Ander as Sie
- Hermann Thimig as Er
- Theo Lingen as Mr. Bottlekeeper
- Ida Wüst as Mrs. Thomas, seine Schwester
- Eva Schmid-Kayser as Ellen, ihre Tochter
- Sigi Hofer as Schnorrberger
- Julius Falkenstein as Gerichtsvollzieher Maschke
- Luigi Bernauer as Der Barsänger
- Karl Junge-Swinburne as Der Hoteldirektor
- Bruno Steinwald as Der Bardirektor

== Bibliography ==
- Klaus, Ulrich J. Deutsche Tonfilme: Jahrgang 1932. Klaus-Archiv, 1988.
- Willibald Eser. Theo Lingen, Komiker aus Versehen. Langen Müller, 1986.
