= A Song Goes Round the World (1958 film) =

1958 film directed by Géza von Bolváry

- Directed by: Géza von Bolváry
- Written by: Ernst Neubach
- Produced by: Ernst Neubach
- Starring: Hans Reiser; Sabine Sesselmann; Ruth Stephan
- Cinematography: Ernst W. Kalinke
- Edited by: Anneliese Schönnenbeck
- Music by: Hans May
- Production company: Neubach Film
- Distributed by: Constantin Film
- Release date: 14 November 1958
- Running time: 103 minutes
- Country: West Germany
- Language: German

A Song Goes Round the World (German: Ein Lied geht um die Welt) is a 1958 West German musical film directed by Géza von Bolváry and starring Hans Reiser, Sabine Sesselmann, and Ruth Stephan. The film is a biopic of the singer and film actor Joseph Schmidt. The title is a reference to his best-known song and a 1933 film of the same title in which he starred.

It was made at the Bavaria Studios in Munich. The film's sets were designed by the art director Ernst Richter.

== Cast ==
- Hans Reiser as Joseph Schmidt
- Sabine Sesselmann as Brigitte von Hilden
- Ruth Stephan as Malvine
- Theo Lingen as Himmel
- Karl Lieffen as Pianist Schlange
- Annie Rosar as Mutter Schmidt
- Susanne Korda as Renée
- Lotte Ledl as Mizzi
- Hans Hais
- Johanna Hofer as Frau von Hilden
- Käthe Itter
- Wolf Petersen
- Max Strassberg as Strassberg
- Jaspar von Oertzen

== Bibliography ==
- Bock, Hans-Michael; Bergfelder, Tim, eds. (2009). The Concise Cinegraph: Encyclopaedia of German Cinema. New York: Berghahn Books. ISBN 978-1-57181-655-9.
