= The Pilgrimage of Love =

1923 film

- Directed by: Yakov Protazanov
- Written by: Karl Figdor
- Produced by: Paul Davidson
- Starring: Gustav von Wangenheim; Charlotte Ander; Wilhelm Diegelmann
- Cinematography: Willy Gaebel
- Production company: PAGU
- Distributed by: UFA
- Release date: 12 January 1923
- Country: Germany
- Languages: Silent; German intertitles

The Pilgrimage of Love (German: Der Liebe Pilgerfahrt) is a 1923 German silent drama film directed by Yakov Protazanov and starring Gustav von Wangenheim, Charlotte Ander and Wilhelm Diegelmann. It was shot at the Tempelhof Studios in Berlin. The film's sets were designed by the art director Jack Winter.

== Cast ==
In alphabetical order

- Charlotte Ander as Enkelin Solveig
- Paul Bildt as Maler Gundersen
- Dall'orso as Sohn Graf Erik Hegermann-Lilienkrone
- Wilhelm Diegelmann as Solveigs Großvater
- Grete Diercks as Karin
- Olga Engl as Gräfin Hegermann-Lilienkrone
- Viktor Schwannecke as Oberlehrer Dr. Daniel Bornemann
- Gustav von Wangenheim as Dr. Egil Rostrup

== Bibliography ==
- Bock, Hans-Michael & Bergfelder, Tim. The Concise CineGraph. Encyclopedia of German Cinema. Berghahn Books, 2009.
- Grange, William. Cultural Chronicle of the Weimar Republic. Scarecrow Press, 2008.
