= My Song Goes Round the World =

- Joseph Schmidt and Charlotte Ander
- Directed by: Richard Oswald
- Written by: Ernst Neubach; Clifford Grey; Frank Miller
- Produced by: Richard Oswald
- Starring: Joseph Schmidt; John Loder; Charlotte Ander; Jack Barty
- Cinematography: Reimar Kuntze
- Edited by: Walter Stokvis
- Music by: Hans May
- Production company: British International Pictures
- Distributed by: Associated British Picture Corporation
- Release date: 22 September 1934
- Running time: 70 minutes
- Country: United Kingdom
- Language: English

My Song Goes Round the World is a 1934 British musical film directed by Richard Oswald and starring Joseph Schmidt, John Loder and Charlotte Ander. It was an English-language version of the 1933 German film A Song Goes Round the World, also directed by Oswald.

== Cast ==
- Joseph Schmidt as Ricardo
- John Loder as Rico
- Charlotte Ander as Nina
- Jack Barty as Simoni
- Jimmy Godden as Manager
- Hal Gordon as Stage Manager
