= Alfred Zachariewicz =

Polish architect

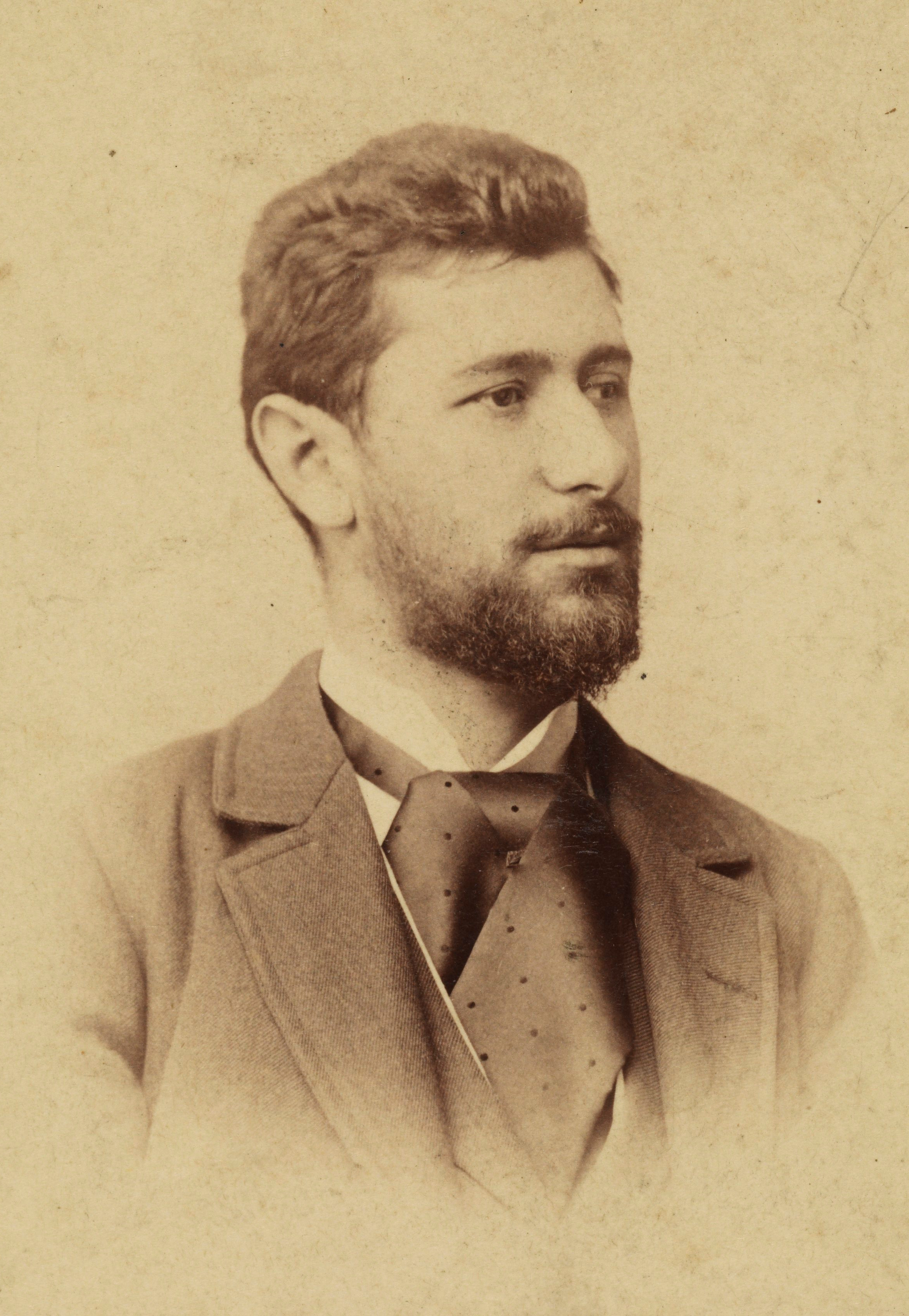
Zachariewicz in 1893

Alfred Zachariewicz (26 August 1871 – 11 July 1937), was a Polish architect. He was born in Lemberg, Austria-Hungary on 26 August 1871, as the son of Julian Oktawjan Zachariewicz. He worked in the region of Galicia, mainly in Lviv, designing public and industrial buildings such as the edifices of Izba Handlowo-Przemysłowa, the Bank of Lviv, the Passage of Mikolasch in Lviv, as well as bridges, tenements, villas, goods stations (Lviv railway station).

He died in Warsaw on 11 July 1937.
