= Maria Orska =

German actress (1893–1930)

- Maria Orska on promotional postcard from c. 1920. Photographed by A. Macsigay, Hamburg. Card published by Photochemie, Berlin.
- Born: Rachel Blindermann; 16 March 1893; Nikolaev, Russian Empire
- Died: 16 May 1930 (aged 37); Vienna, Austria
- Other name: Maria Daisy Orska
- Spouse: Hans von Bleichröder (23 January 1888 – 1938)
- Relatives: Gabryela Marchesa di Serra Mantschedda and Edwin Orska

Maria Orska (16 March 1893 – 16 May 1930) was an important actress of the German theater and cinema in the 1920s.

== Life ==
Maria Orska was born as Rachel Blindermann in 1893, to a Polish Jewish father Habrán Moiseyvich Blindermann, who was a lawyer and Austrian monther Augusta Frankfurter. Orska was born in a city of Nikolaev, not far from Odessa, in the Russian Empire (present-day Ukraine). Just before World War I, Maria Orska moved to Vienna, Hamburg and Berlin in 1915. She spoke fluently German, French, Italian, Russian and Polish.

In Berlin, Maria Orska worked with Rudolf Bernauer in the Hebbel Theater, Max Reinhardt and was famous for her parts in theater plays by Strindberg, Wedekind and Pirandello. She also gained national popularity in Germany for her film parts, although theater was always more important to her. Her first movie Dämon und Mensch (1915) was produced by Jules Greenbaum, one of the pioneers of the German cinema, who discovered cinema during his 20 years long stay in Chicago and migrated back to Germany in 1895. Most of her movies were produced by Alfred Maack, director and producer employed by Greenbaum. She was sometimes credited in films and film publicity materials as Maria Daisy Orska.

Oskar Kokoschka drew in 1922, a famous portrait of her, now kept as a lithograph in collections of several museums. Orska married an important Jewish banker from Berlin in 12. November, 1920, Baron Hans von Bleichröder (grandson of Gerson von Bleichröder) and took a name of Baroness von Bleichröder. They were divorced in 1925. Maria Orska's lover, a wealthy Jewish industrialist and geologist Julius Koritschoner from Vienna, shot himself in Constantinople in 1928, writing before death a letter to Orska. His morphine addiction is thought to have made him suicidal.

Maria Orska's sister Gabryela Marchesa di Serra Mantschedda, married to an Italian aristocrat, committed suicide in 1926 by hanging herself on a curtain rope in a Berlin hotel, after a heated argument with Maria.

Her youngest brother, Edwin Orska, aviator of the Russian Empire Air Force, survived the Bolshevik Revolution and lived in Berlin until 1937. He married in Ecuador South America in 1938. He died in Quito in 1966 at the age of 71.

Maria Orska enjoyed enormous popularity in Central Europe in the 1920s. Her stage performances at the Hebbel-Theater in the Kreuzberg district were seen as extraordinary by the Berlin audience of that era. Her photographs appeared on covers of magazines, postcards with her portraits were distributed all over that part of the continent.

Maria Orska committed suicide in 1930, in Vienna. Some people speculate that an addiction to morphine had a decisive influence on the last years of her life.

== Filmography ==
Maria Orska – portrait by Oskar Kokoschka, 1922

- 1915 Dämon und Mensch
- 1915/1916 Das tanzende Herz
- 1916 Die Sektwette
- 1916 Der lebende Tote
- 1916 Der Sumpf
- The Confessions of the Green Mask (1916)
- 1916 Adamants letztes Rennen
- 1917 Die schwarze Loo
- The Last Hour (1921)
- 1920/1921 Die Bestie im Menschen
- 1920/1921 Der Streik der Diebe
- Fridericus Rex (1922)
- 1922 Opfer der Leidenschaft
- 1922/1923 Fridericus Rex. 3. Sanssouci
