= Walter Reimann =

German art director

- Born: 2 June 1887; Berlin, German Empire
- Died: 8 November 1936 (aged 49); Bad Godesberg, Bonn, North Rhine-Westphalia, Nazi Germany
- Occupation: Art director
- Years active: 1919–1936 (film)

Walter Reimann (2 June 1887 – 8 November 1936) was a German painter and art director. He was an Expressionist and member of the group of artists associated with Zurich magazine, Der Sturm. He worked on the production design of a number of films during his career, the most important of which was The Cabinet of Dr. Caligari.

Along with fellow members of the Der Sturm group, Walter Röhrig and Hermann Warm, Reimann created skewed, dreamlike sets that distorted geometry and indicated the interior states of mind of the characters. The Cabinet of Dr. Caligari was an international success and the production design has had a lasting influence on other movies - especially in the horror and film noir genres - since then. The Caligari design is echoed in the sets produced by Universal Studios for their series of classic monster movies in the 1930s.

Reimann continued to work as an art director in Germany until his death in 1936, but none of his subsequent designs had the impact of Caligari.

In 2017, the Art Directors Guild honored Reimann's work and legacy with a tribute at Grauman's Egyptian Theatre in Hollywood.

== Selected filmography ==
- The Plague of Florence (1919)
- The Cabinet of Dr. Caligari (1920)
- Algol (1920)
- The Eternal Curse (1921)
- Vanina (1922)
- A Dying Nation (1922)
- The False Dimitri (1922)
- Nora (1923)
- The Island of Tears (1923)
- The Green Manuela (1923)
- A Woman, an Animal, a Diamond (1923)
- Our Heavenly Bodies (1925)
- Cock of the Roost (1925)
- The Island of Dreams (1925)
- The Wig (1925)
- Fire of Love (1925)
- The Last Waltz (1927)
- A Daughter of Destiny (1928)
- Guilty (1928)
- Retreat on the Rhine (1930)
- Police Spy 77 (1930)
- The Woman Without Nerves (1930)
- Rasputin, Demon with Women (1932)
- Paprika (1932)
- Secret of the Blue Room (1932)
- Theodor Körner (1932)
- Maid Happy (1933)
- The Gentleman from Maxim's (1933)
- What Am I Without You (1934)
- Elisabeth and the Fool (1934)
- The Girl Irene (1936)

== Bibliography ==
- Michael L. Stephens. Art Directors in Cinema: A Worldwide Biographical Dictionary. McFarland, 1998.
