= A Song Goes Round the World (1933 film) =

1933 film directed by Richard Oswald

- Directed by: Richard Oswald
- Written by: Ernst Neubach; Heinz Goldberg
- Produced by: Richard Oswald
- Starring: Joseph Schmidt; Viktor de Kowa; Charlotte Ander; Fritz Kampers
- Cinematography: Reimar Kuntze
- Edited by: Friedel Buckow
- Music by: Hans May
- Production company: Rio-Film
- Distributed by: Terra Film
- Release date: 9 May 1933
- Running time: 75 minutes
- Country: Germany
- Language: German

A Song Goes Round the World (German: Ein Lied geht um die Welt) is a 1933 German drama film directed by Richard Oswald and starring Joseph Schmidt, Viktor de Kowa and Charlotte Ander. It was shot at the Johannisthal Studios in Berlin with sets designed by the art director Franz Schroedter. An English-language version of the film, My Song Goes Round the World, was made by British International Pictures, also directed by Oswald. The film serves as a semi-biopic of Joseph Schmidt, who appears in it himself. A 1958 film of the same name was also a biopic of Schmidt, who was by then dead.

== Cast ==
- Joseph Schmidt as Ricardo
- Viktor de Kowa as Rigo
- Charlotte Ander as Nina
- Fritz Kampers as Simoni
- Carl de Vogt as Theaterdirektor
- Carl Auen as Danto, Operndirektor
- Edith Karin as Seine Sekretärin
- Ida Perry as Wirtin

== Release ==
Joseph Goebbels attended the premier on 6 May 1933 despite the fact that Schmidt was Jewish. The film was banned in October 1937.

== Works cited ==
- Hull, David (1969). Film in the Third Reich: Art and Propaganda in Nazi Germany. Simon & Schuster. SBN 671214861.

== Bibliography ==
- Klaus, Ulrich J. Deutsche Tonfilme: Jahrgang 1933. Klaus-Archiv, 1988.
