= Paul Bildt =

German actor (1885–1957)

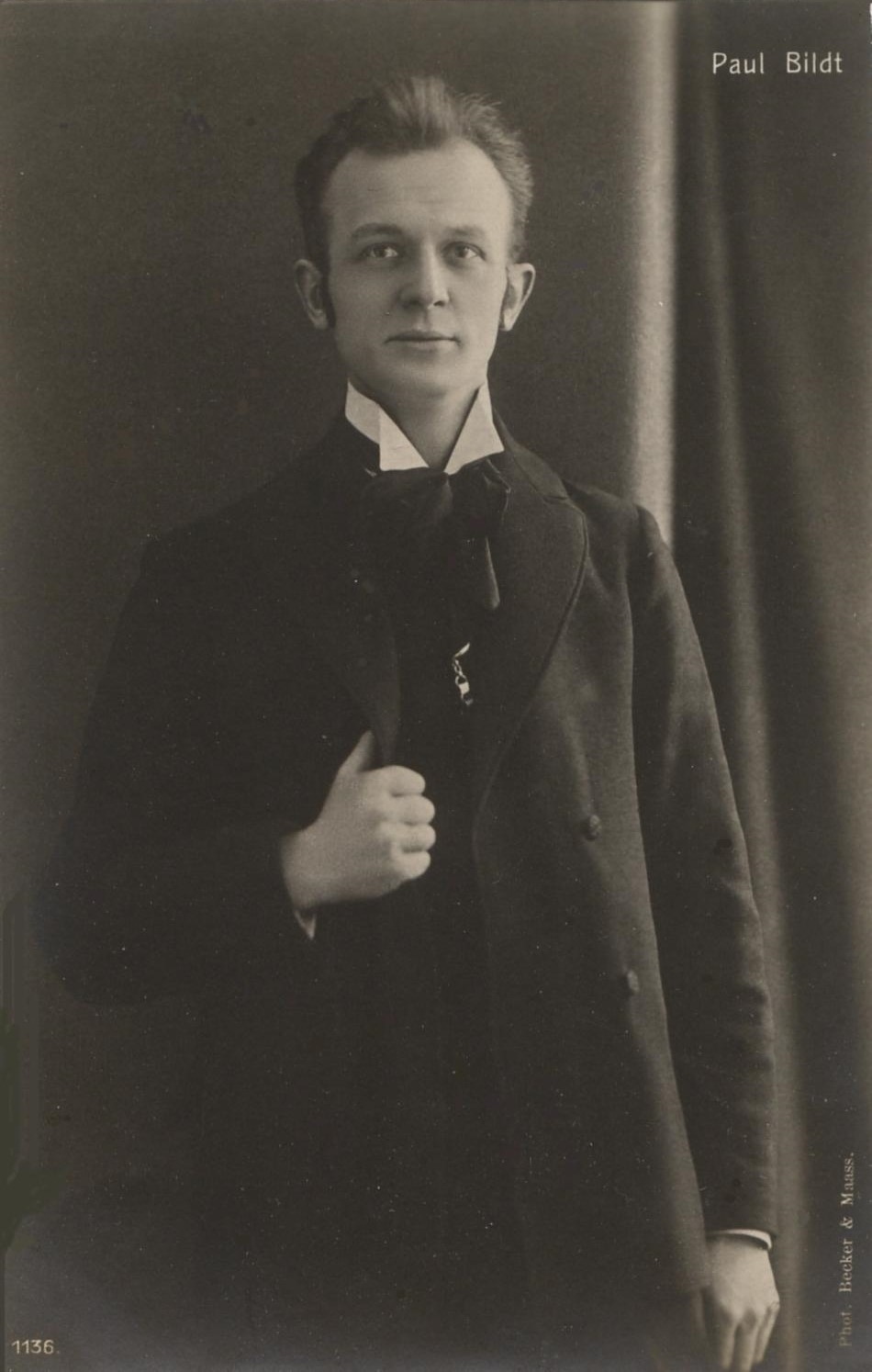
- Born: 19 May 1885; Berlin, German Empire
- Died: 13 March 1957 (aged 71); West Berlin, West Germany
- Occupation: Actor
- Years active: 1910-1956

Paul Hermann Bildt (19 May 1885 – 13 March 1957) was a German film actor. He appeared in more than 180 films between 1910 and 1956. He was born in Berlin and died in Zehlendorf, West Berlin.

== Selected filmography ==
- Devil in Silk (1956)
- Ich suche Dich (1956)
- The Plot to Assassinate Hitler (1955)
- A Heart Full of Music (1955)
- The Dark Star (1955)
- Reaching for the Stars (1955)
- Ludwig II (1955)
- Sky Without Stars (1955)
- Son Without a Home (1955)
- Sauerbruch – Das war mein Leben (1954)
- The Missing Miniature (1954)
- The Angel with the Flaming Sword (1954)
- As Long as You're Near Me (1953)
- The Stronger Woman (1953)
- Must We Get Divorced? (1953)
- Toxi (1952)
- No Greater Love (1952)
- All Clues Lead to Berlin (1952)
- The Great Temptation (1952)
- Father Needs a Wife (1952)
- Heart of Stone (1950)
- The Council of the Gods (1950)
- Don't Dream, Annette (1949)
- The Beaver Coat (1949)
- Blum Affair (1948)
- Raid (1947)
- Tell the Truth (1946)
- Kolberg (1945)
- Opfergang (1944)
- The Great Love (1942)
- With the Eyes of a Woman (1942)
- Attack on Baku (1942)
- Friedemann Bach (1941)
- The Girl from Fano (1941)
- The Gasman (1941)
- The Girl at the Reception (1940)
- Two Worlds (1940)
- Our Miss Doctor (1940)
- Bachelor's Paradise (1939)
- The Leghorn Hat (1939)
- Woman Without a Past (1939)
- Who's Kissing Madeleine? (1939)
- D III 88 (1939)
- Robert Koch (1939)
- The False Step (1939)
- Twelve Minutes After Midnight (1939)
- Alarm at Station III (1939)
- The Governor (1939)
- Yvette (1938)
- Anna Favetti (1938)
- All Lies (1938)
- The Roundabouts of Handsome Karl (1938)
- You and I (1938)
- By a Silken Thread (1938)
- Dance on the Volcano (1938)
- The Deruga Case (1938)
- Secret Mission (1938)
- Madame Bovary (1937)
- The Man Who Was Sherlock Holmes (1937)
- The Ruler (1937)
- To New Shores (1937)
- Signal in the Night (1937)
- Donogoo Tonka (1936)
- Moscow-Shanghai (1936)
- Savoy Hotel 217 (1936)
- City of Anatol (1936)
- I Love All the Women (1935)
- The Foolish Virgin (1935)
- Victoria (1935)
- Streak of Steel (1935)
- William Tell (1934)
- Thea Roland (1932)
- The Invisible Front (1932)
- 1914 (1931)
- Dreyfus (1930)
- The Other (1930)
- Prinz Louis Ferdinand (1927)
- Potsdam (1927)
- Sister Veronika (1927)
- Lützow's Wild Hunt (1927)
- The Girl with the Five Zeros (1927)
- The Flames Lie (1926)
- Children of No Importance (1926)
- People to Each Other (1926)
- Slums of Berlin (1925)
- The Hanseatics (1925)
- Destiny (1925)
- The Humble Man and the Chanteuse (1925)
- Our Heavenly Bodies (1925)
- An Artist of Life (1925)
- Doctor Wislizenus (1924)
- The Pilgrimage of Love (1923)
- A Woman, an Animal, a Diamond (1923)
- Friedrich Schiller (1923)
- The Pagoda (1923)
- The Lady and Her Hairdresser (1922)
- The Haunted Castle (1921)
- Lady Hamilton (1921)
- The House in Dragon Street (1921)
- Parisian Women (1921)
- The Woman in the Trunk (1921)
- The Golden Plague (1921)
- Figures of the Night (1920)
- The Prisoner (1920)
- The Guilt of Lavinia Morland (1920)
- The Living Dead (1919)
- Rose Bernd (1919)
- The Adventure of a Ball Night (1918)
- Precious Stones (1918)
- The Nun and the Harlequin (1918)
- Imprisoned Soul (1917)
- The Princess of Neutralia (1917)
