= Joseph Schmidt =

Austro-Hungarian tenor (1904–1942)

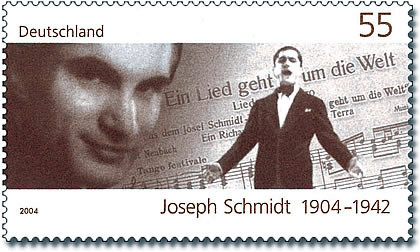
Stamp commemorating the birth of Joseph Schmidt (Deutsche Post 2004). The musical score shows the title of his 1933 film Ein Lied geht um die Welt (A song goes round the world)

Joseph Schmidt (photograph by Roman Vishniac)

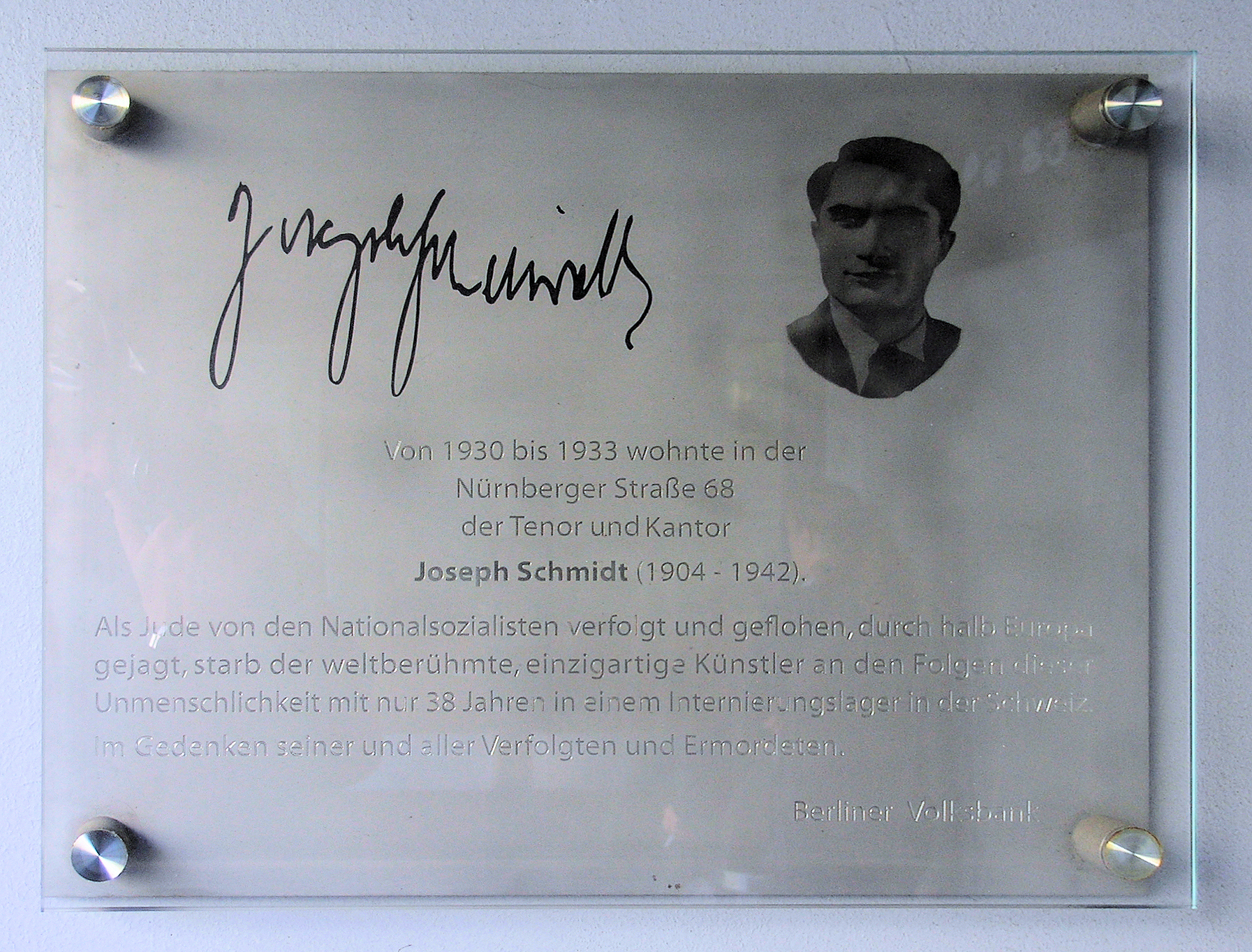
Memory plaque in Berlin-Schöneberg, 68 Nürnberger St.

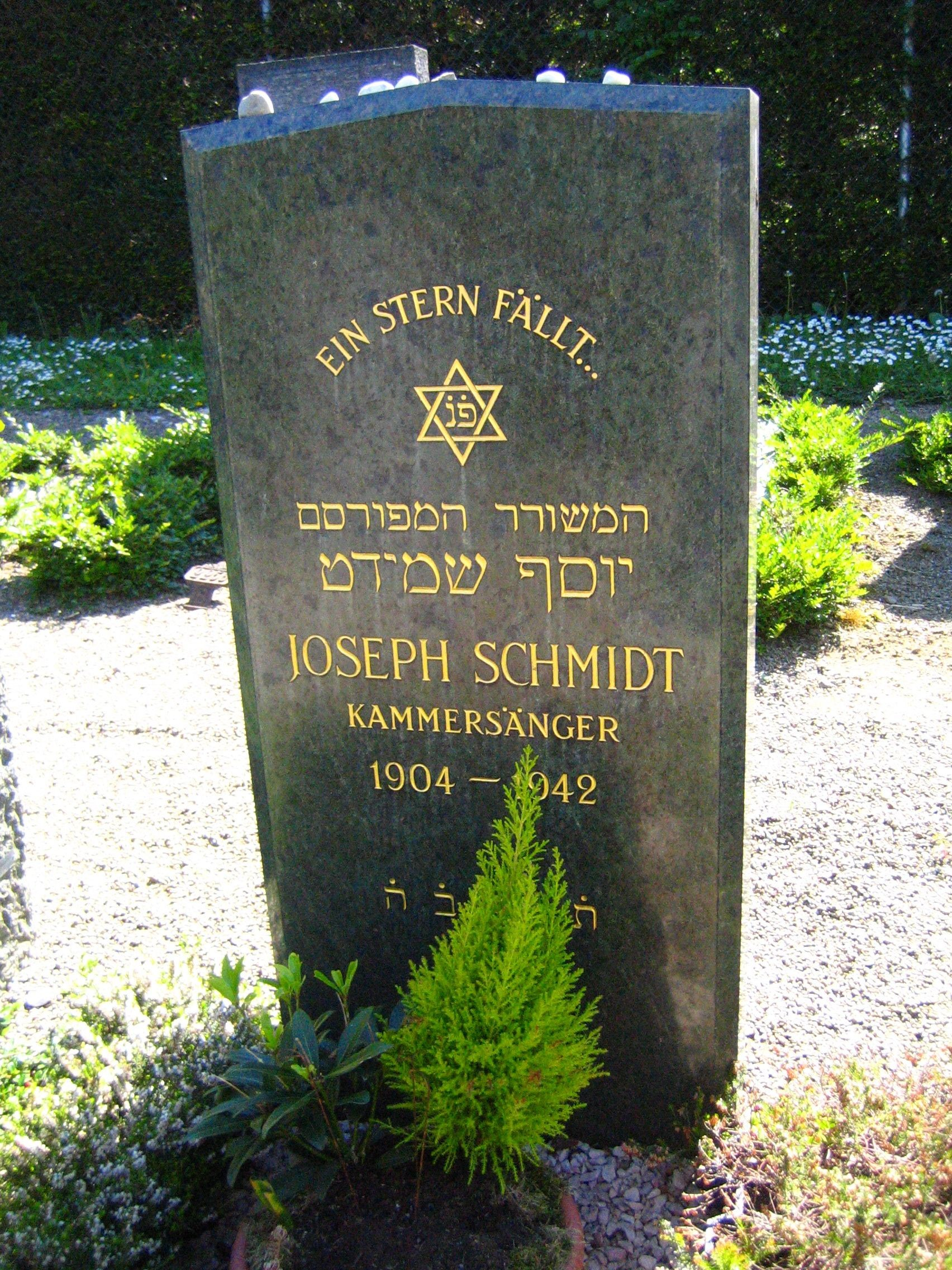
Joseph Schmidt's grave in the Wiedikon district of Zürich

Joseph Schmidt (4 March 1904 – 16 November 1942) was an Austro-Hungarian and Romanian Jewish tenor.

== Life and career ==
Schmidt was born in Davideny (Ukrainian: Davydivka) village in the Storozhynets district of the Bukovina province of Austria-Hungary, which became part of Romania after World War I and is now part of Ukraine. In addition to German, which was his first language, and Yiddish, he learned Hebrew and became fluent in Romanian, French and English. His first vocal training was as a boy alto in the Czernowitz Synagogue. His talents were quickly recognised and by 1924 he was featured in his first solo recital in Czernowitz singing traditional Jewish songs and arias by Verdi, Puccini, Rossini and Bizet. Soon he moved to Berlin and took piano and singing lessons from Professor Hermann Weißenborn at the Königliche Musikschule. He returned to Romania for his military service.

In 1929, he went back to Berlin, where Cornelis Bronsgeest, a famous Dutch baritone, engaged him for a radio broadcast as Vasco da Gama in Meyerbeer's L'Africaine. This was the beginning of a successful international career. Owing to his diminutive stature (he was just over 1.5 m, or 4' 11") a stage career was impossible; however his voice was extremely well suited for radio. He made many records, first for Ultraphone, then for Odeon/Parlophone, was featured in many radio broadcasts and acted in several movies in both German and English.

After the Nazis came to power in Germany, Joseph Schmidt enjoyed his greatest successes outside that country. In 1937, he toured the United States and performed in Carnegie Hall together with other prominent singers such as Grace Moore. He was still very much welcome in the Netherlands and Belgium, where he was immensely popular.

In 1939, he visited his mother in Czernowitz for the last time. As the Second World War was about to erupt, Schmidt was in Belgium and booked steamship passage from Marseilles to the United States. Schmidt was rejected at the Hapag Travel Agency after someone else had assumed his identity and taken his ticket. He was then caught in France by the German invasion. He unsuccessfully attempted to escape to Cuba. After making a dash for the Swiss border, he was interned in a Swiss refugee camp in Girenbad near Zürich in October 1942. He had already been in frail health, and was treated for a throat infection at the local hospital. Schmidt had complained of chest pains, but this was dismissed and he was discharged on 14 November 1942.

Just two days later, on 16 November 1942, while attempting to recover at the nearby Waldegg Inn, the famous singer collapsed. The hostess let him rest on her couch, but not long after, she noticed that he was no longer breathing. Schmidt had suffered a heart attack. He was 38 years old. He was to have been issued a work permit the following day, so he would have been able to move freely within Switzerland. Joseph Schmidt is buried at Israelitischer Friedhof Unterer Friesenberg in Zürich.

A plaque is mounted at the inn where he died.

== Voice and versatility ==
He had a lyric tenor voice with a high register reaching up to a high D. His voice was also admired for its agility, and consistent vibrato, which he demonstrated on his recordings of "Ah si ben mio" from Il trovatore and "Una furtiva lagrima" from L'elisir d'amore. This timbre was seen as desirable for the melodies of Schubert and Lehár. His popular song recordings were the best-sellers of that age. His ability to adapt to any genre or language made him famous in the Netherlands too; he did not only perform for thousands of fans in open air festivals, but also sang in Dutch convincingly, although he did not speak the language. His diction is considered iconic and the song Ik hou van Holland (translating into 'I Love Holland') was even used as the title/music score of a documentary series and a game show on Dutch television, 70 years after its first performance by Schmidt.

The most thorough discography of the tenor is that of Hansfried Sieben, published in the quarterly journal Record Collector (Chelmsford, Essex) for June 2000.

== Films with Joseph Schmidt ==
- Der Liebesexpreß (The Love Express, 1931, Germany)
- Goethe lebt...! (1932)
- Gehetzte Menschen (1932)
- Ein Lied geht um die Welt (1933) (A Song Goes Round the World)
- My Song Goes Round the World (1934)
- When You're Young, the World Belongs to You (1934)
- A Star Fell from Heaven (1934)
- A Star Fell from Heaven (1936)
- Heut' ist der schönste Tag in meinem Leben (1936)

== Recordings ==
In the 1930s Schmidt's records were already sold in many countries of Europe and in the English-speaking world. Since 1945 numerous recordings of his music have been published worldwide first on vinyl records and later on CDs. The most comprehensive edition of his music at present is a 10 CD Box published in 2009 by the Documents label of Membran Music titled Joseph Schmidt: Ein Stern fällt vom Himmel - A Star Falls From Heaven (EAN Nr. 4011222327826 Order Nr. 232782). It contains 138 tracks with a total playing time of 443 minutes.

- Josef Schmidt • Eterna 737. LP.
- Joseph Schmidt - Sämtliche EMI-Aufnahmen - The Complete EMI recordings, Vols 1 and 2, EMI Classics, 1992. Vol. 1: CHS 7 64673 2; USA CDHB 64673. Vol. 2: CHS 7 64676 2; USA CDHB 64676. Volume 1 consists of 44 classical recordings on two CDs, while Volume 2 includes more classical recordings, and songs in German and English that Hans May wrote for the films in which Schmidt appeared, plus one in French, and another in Dutch; 39 recordings on 2 CDs.
- Joseph Schmidt Sings Concert Favorites, Decca Gold Label Series, DL 9538 (1951). Songs: Mattinata; Santa Lucia; Maria, Mari; L'Ariatella; Funiculi-Funicula; Tiritomba; Lisetta; Vienna Bonbons; Simplicius; Ich Bin Ein Zigeunerkind; Today Is the Happiest Day of My Life; A Star Falls from Heaven.
